= Andrey Smirnov (diplomat) =

Soviet diplomat (1905–1982)

- Андрей Смирнов
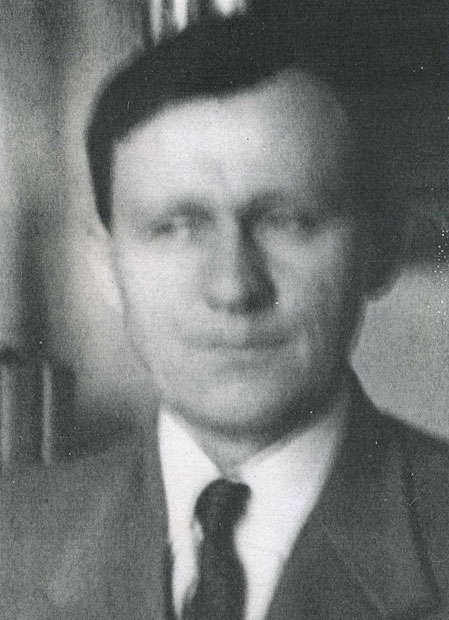

Ambassador to Iran
- In office 28 June 1941 – 1 September 1943
- Preceded by: Matvey Filimonov
- Succeeded by: Konstantin Mikhailov

Ambassador to Austria
- In office 31 March – 14 October 1956
- Preceded by: Ivan Ilyichev
- Succeeded by: Sergey Lapin

Ambassador to West Germany
- In office 14 October 1956 – 19 May 1966
- Preceded by: Valerian Zorin
- Succeeded by: Semyon Tsarapkin

Ambassador to Turkey
- In office 19 May 1966 – 6 January 1969
- Preceded by: Nikita Ryzhov
- Succeeded by: Vasily Grubyakov

Personal details
- Born: 15 October 1905 Moscow, Russian Empire
- Died: 26 February 1982 (aged 76)
- Party: CPSU

Andrey Andreyevich Smirnov (Russian: Андре́й Андре́евич Смирно́в; 15 October 1905, Moscow – 26 February 1982) was a Soviet career diplomat.

== Early life ==
Smirnov graduated from the Leningrad Institute of Planning in 1934, and joined the People's Commissariat of Foreign Affairs in 1936. From 1940 until diplomatic relations were broken off with Nazi Germany on 22 June 1941, he was an adviser at the Embassy of the USSR in Germany.

== Diplomatic career ==
He was appointed as Ambassador of the Soviet Union to Iran on 28 June 1941, awarded the diplomatic rank of Ambassador Extraordinary and Plenipotentiary on 14 June 1943, and served in Tehran until 1 September 1943.

At the conclusion of his mission to Iran, he returned to Moscow and worked in the European Department of the Ministry of Foreign Affairs, and was promoted to Deputy Minister of Foreign Affairs in 1946, and held this position under 1949. On 31 March 1956, he began his mission as Ambassador of the Soviet Union to Austria, serving in Vienna only until 14 October 1956.

He began his mission as Ambassador of the Soviet Union to West Germany on 14 October 1956, and held the post for 10 years, until 19 May 1966. At the expiration of his mission to Bonn, he was appointed as Ambassador of the Soviet Union to Turkey on 19 May 1966, and served in the Turkish capital Ankara until 6 January 1969.

At the conclusion of his mission to Turkey, he returned to Moscow as the Deputy Minister of Foreign Affairs, and also served as Chairman of the USSR Commission for UNESCO from 1970—1973.
