= List of ambassadors of Russia to Austria =

Ambassador of the Russian Federation to the Republic of Austria
- Botschaft der Russischen Föderation in der Republik Österreich
- Emblem of the Russian Foreign Ministry
- Incumbent; Andrey Grozov since 14 October 2025
- Ministry of Foreign Affairs; Embassy of Russia in Vienna
- Style: His Excellency; The Honourable
- Reports to: Minister of Foreign Affairs
- Seat: Vienna
- Appointer: President of Russia
- Term length: At the pleasure of the president
- Website: Embassy of Russia in Vienna

The ambassador extraordinary and plenipotentiary of the Russian Federation to the Republic of Austria is the official representative of the president and the government of the Russian Federation to the president and the government of the Republic of Austria.

The ambassador and his staff work at large in the Embassy of Russia in Vienna. The post of Russian ambassador to Austria is currently held by Andrey Grozov, incumbent since 14 October 2025.

== History of diplomatic relations ==
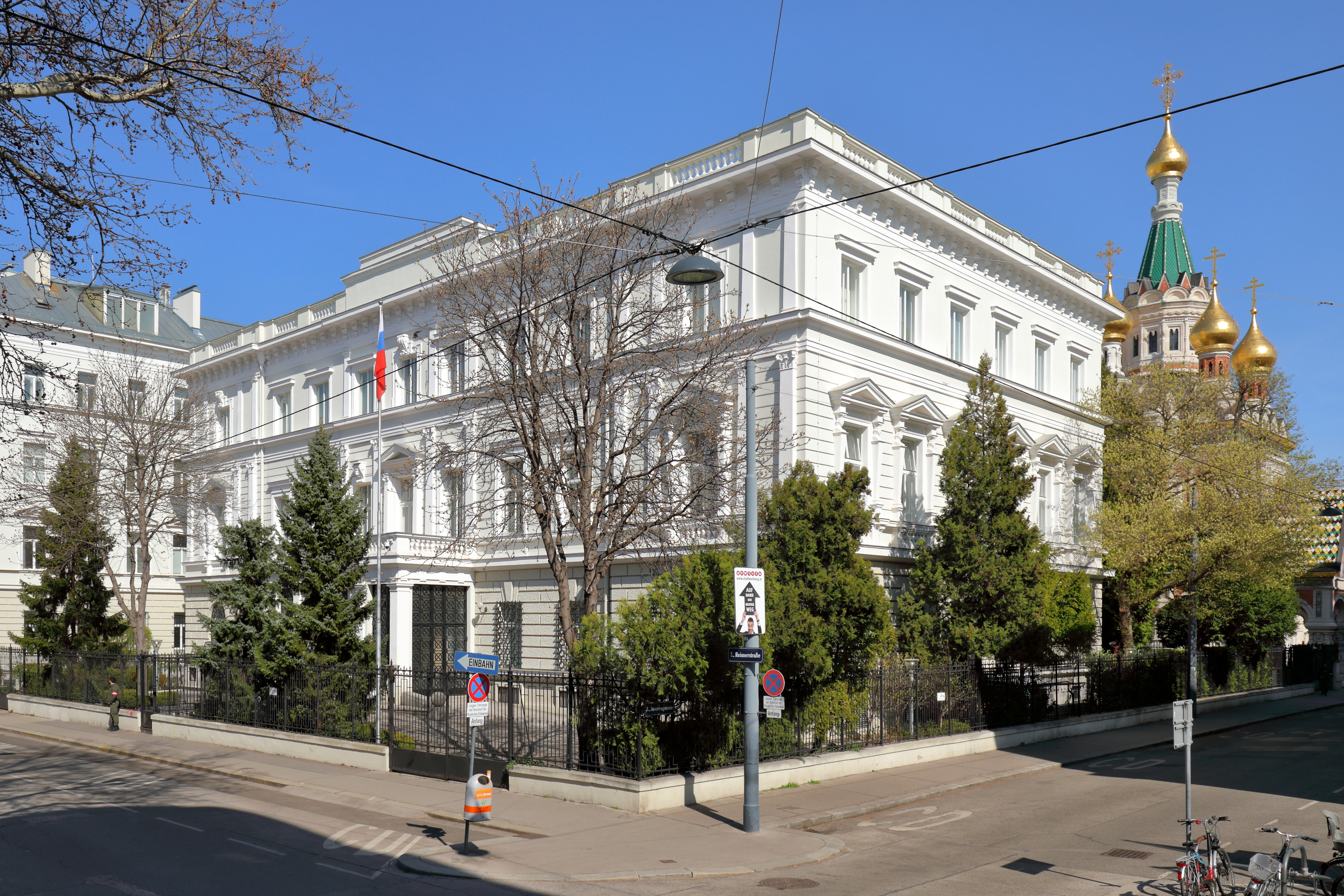
Building of the Embassy of the Russian Federation in Vienna and right the Nicholas Orthodox Cathedral (2022)

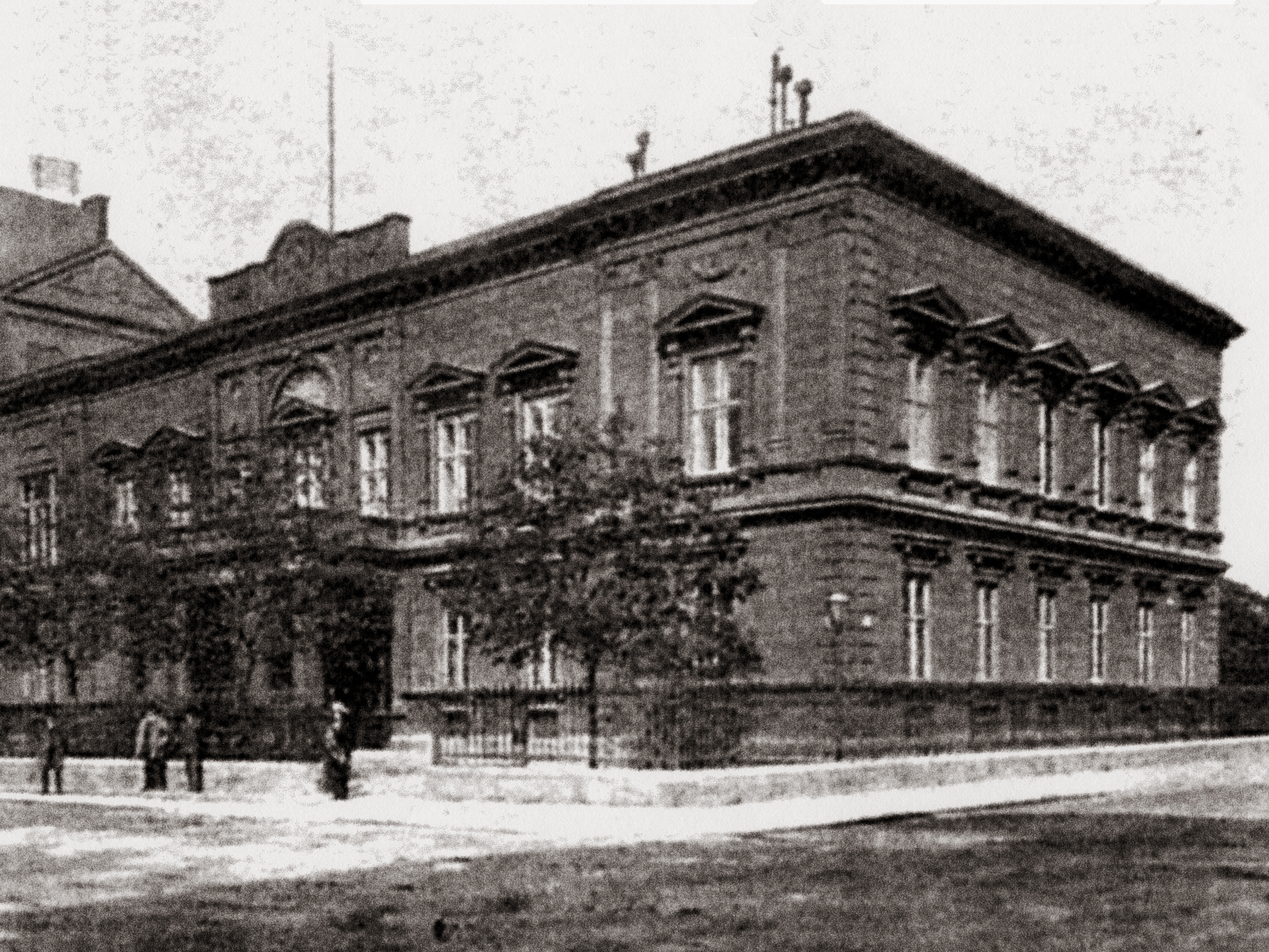
A late-19th-century photograph of the building purchased by Lobanov-Rostovsky in 1891, and which still houses the Embassy of Russia in Vienna.

The first ambassador of Russia to Austria was Prince Dmitry Mikhailovich Golitsyn and he served in this position from 1763 until 1792. Gallitzinstraße, the street where his ambassadorial villa was located is named after him. In 1792 Count Andrey Kirillovich Razumovsky became ambassador in Vienna, where he kept contact with representatives of the European aristocracy, politicians and artists. While in Vienna, he built the Palais Rasumofsky, and also financed construction of a stone bridge across the Danube. As a patron of the arts, Razumovsky established an art gallery, and commissioned Beethoven to compose the famous Razumovsky string quartets.

Austria is closely linked to the fate of prominent Russian diplomat and statesman Prince Alexander Mikhailovich Gorchakov. He arrived in Vienna in 1833 as an adviser to the embassy, and, from 1854 to 1856, he led the Russian diplomatic mission. Gorchakov became Envoy Extraordinary and Minister Plenipotentiary to the Austrian court at the most difficult period for Russia during the Crimean War, during which time he was able to preserve diplomatic relations with Austria and helped to overcome the international isolation of the Russian Empire and reinforced Russia's status as a great power. The Vienna Conference in 1855 was the first presence of Gorchakov in an international forum, and his performance in representing Russia at the Paris Conference of 1856 saw Alexander II appoint him as Russian Minister of Foreign Affairs.

In 1882, scientist and diplomat Prince Aleksey Borisovich Lobanov-Rostovsky was appointed as the Empire's representative in Vienna. In 1891 he bought several houses on Reisnerstraße from Adolphe I, Grand Duke of Luxembourg, the former Duke of Nassau, which still houses the embassy and consular section in Vienna, and he also began construction of the Nicholas Orthodox Cathedral.

After the collapse of the Austro-Hungarian monarchy in 1918 and the proclamation of the First Austrian Republic, diplomatic relations with the Union of Soviet Socialist Republics were established on 25 February 1924. The first Soviet Plenipotentiary in Vienna was Jan Antonovich Berzin. Diplomatic relations were broken in March 1938 after the German invasion of Austria and its incorporation into Nazi Germany. After the Second World War, the USSR and Austria re-established diplomatic relations at the level of political representation, which in 1953 was converted into embassies. The preamble of the Austrian State Treaty, signed on 15 May 1955 by the USSR, United States, United Kingdom, France and Austria, established that the treaty formed the basis of Soviet relations with Austria. After the dissolution of the Soviet Union, relations continued between the Russian Federation and the Austrian state.

== Ambassadors ==
Name	Photo	Title	Date from	Date until	Russian state	Austrian state
Dmitry Mikhailovich Golitsyn		Ambassador	October 1761	April 1792	Russian Empire	Holy Roman Empire
Andrey Kirillovich Razumovsky		Ambassador	5 October 1801	7 September 1806	Russian Empire	Holy Roman Empire/Austrian Empire
Gustav Ernst Graf von Stackelberg		Ambassador	14 May 1810	9 November 1818	Russian Empire	Austrian Empire
Yury Aleksandrovich Golovkin		Envoy	9 November 1818	16 September 1822	Russian Empire	Austrian Empire
Dmitry Pavlovich Tatishchev		Ambassador	22 August 1826	11 September 1841	Russian Empire	Austrian Empire
Pavel Ivanovich Medem		Envoy	24 December 1848	31 August 1850	Russian Empire	Austrian Empire
Peter von Meyendorff		Envoy	31 August 1850	7 January 1854	Russian Empire	Austrian Empire
Aleksandr Mikhailovich Gorchakov		Envoy Extraordinary and Minister Plenipotentiary	6 May 1854	15 April 1856	Russian Empire	Austrian Empire
Viktor Petrovich Balabin		Envoy	22 July 1864	12 August 1864	Russian Empire	Austrian Empire
Ernest Gustavovich Stackelberg		Envoy	3 August 1864	25 April 1868	Russian Empire	Austrian Empire/Austria-Hungary
Nikolay Alexeyevich Orlov		Envoy	13 December 1869	2 May 1870	Russian Empire	Austria-Hungary
Yevgeny Petrovich Novikov		Ambassador	2 March 1874	22 December 1879	Russian Empire	Austria-Hungary
Pavel Petrovich Ubri		Ambassador	22 December 1879	1 June 1882	Russian Empire	Austria-Hungary
Aleksey Borisovich Lobanov-Rostovsky		Ambassador	13 July 1882	6 January 1895	Russian Empire	Austria-Hungary
Pyotr Alekseyevich Kapnist		Ambassador	9 April 1895	1904	Russian Empire	Austria-Hungary
Lev Pavlovich Urusov		Ambassador	1905	1910	Russian Empire	Austria-Hungary
Nikolay Nikolayevich Shebeko		Ambassador	1913	1914	Russian Empire	Austria-Hungary
diplomatic relations broken off during World War I 1914-18
Voldemar Khristianovich Aussem		Plenipotentiary Representative	21 May 1924	10 December 1924	Soviet Union	Republic of Austria
Adolf Abramovich Ioffe		Plenipotentiary Representative	12 December 1924	19 June 1925	Soviet Union	Republic of Austria
Jan Antonovich Berzin		Plenipotentiary	19 June 1925	7 September 1927	Soviet Union	Republic of Austria
Konstantin Konstantinovich Yurenev		Plenipotentiary	1 October 1927	24 January 1933	Soviet Union	Republic of Austria
Adolf Markovich Petrovsky		Plenipotentiary	1 April 1933	10 November 1934	Soviet Union	Federal State of Austria
Ivan Leopoldovich Lorents		Plenipotentiary	17 March 1935	31 September 1938	Soviet Union	Federal State of Austria
German annexation of Austria 1938-45 — Allied occupation of Austria 1945-55
Ivan Ivanovich Ilyichev		Supreme Commissar of the USSR/Ambassador Extraordinary and Plenipotentiary	13 June 1953	31 March 1956	Soviet Union	Republic of Austria
Andrey Smirnov		Ambassador Extraordinary and Plenipotentiary	31 March 1956	14 October 1956	Soviet Union	Republic of Austria
Sergey Georgyevich Lapin		Ambassador Extraordinary and Plenipotentiary	19 October 1956	16 June 1960	Soviet Union	Republic of Austria
Viktor Ivanovich Avilov		Ambassador Extraordinary and Plenipotentiary	16 June 1960	13 June 1965	Soviet Union	Republic of Austria
Boris Fedorovich Podtserob		Ambassador Extraordinary and Plenipotentiary	30 June 1965	20 September 1971	Soviet Union	Republic of Austria
Averky Borisovich Aristov		Ambassador Extraordinary and Plenipotentiary	20 September 1971	11 July 1973	Soviet Union	Republic of Austria
Mikhail Timofeyevich Yefremov		Ambassador Extraordinary and Plenipotentiary	10 March 1975	24 October 1986	Soviet Union	Republic of Austria
Gennady Serafimovich Shikin		Ambassador Extraordinary and Plenipotentiary	24 October 1986	24 May 1990	Soviet Union	Republic of Austria
Valery Nikolayevich Popov		Ambassador Extraordinary and Plenipotentiary	24 May 1990	30 August 1996	Soviet Union/Russian Federation	Republic of Austria
Vladimir Mikhailovich Grinin		Ambassador Extraordinary and Plenipotentiary	30 August 1996	29 April 2000	Russian Federation	Republic of Austria
Alexander Vasiliyevich Golovin		Ambassador Extraordinary and Plenipotentiary	4 August 2000	6 August 2004	Russian Federation	Republic of Austria
Stanislav Viliorovich Osadchy		Ambassador Extraordinary and Plenipotentiary	14 September 2004	9 March 2010	Russian Federation	Republic of Austria
Sergey Yurevich Nechayev		Ambassador Extraordinary and Plenipotentiary	9 March 2010	10 August 2015	Russian Federation	Republic of Austria
Dmitry Yevgenevich Lyubinsky		Ambassador Extraordinary and Plenipotentiary	10 August 2015	18 August 2025	Russian Federation	Republic of Austria
Vasily Mikhailovich Veshkurtsev		Temporary chargé d'affaires	18 August 2025	14 October 2025	Russian Federation	Republic of Austria
Andrey Yuryevich Grozov		Ambassador Extraordinary and Plenipotentiary	14 October 2025		Russian Federation	Republic of Austria

== Bibliography ==
- Послы России в Австрии (in Russian). Embassy of Russia in Vienna. Archived from the original on 2012-03-09.
- Послы Российской Федерации В Странах Европы (in Russian). Worldwide Historical Project. Archived from the original on 2011-09-28.
- Представители Российской Империи В Других Странах (in Russian). Worldwide Historical Project. Archived from the original on 2011-09-28.
- Послы Союза Советских Социалистических Республик В Странах Европы (in Russian). Worldwide Historical Project. Archived from the original on 2010-04-25.
