= Balabin =

Balabin (Russian: Балабин) is a Russian masculine surname, its feminine counterpart is Balabina. The name originates from the Russian word balaba meaning round bread and implying a short, chubby person. It may refer to:

- Eugene Balabin (1815–1895), Russian Roman Catholic priest
- Viktor Balabin (1811–1864), Russian diplomat and ambassador

== See also ==
- Alabina
- Balbina (disambiguation)
