= Allied-occupied Austria =

Post-World War II occupation of Austria

Republic of Austria Republik Österreich
- 1945–1955
- Flag Coat of arms
- Anthem: "Bundeshymne der Republik Österreich"
- Occupation zones in Austria

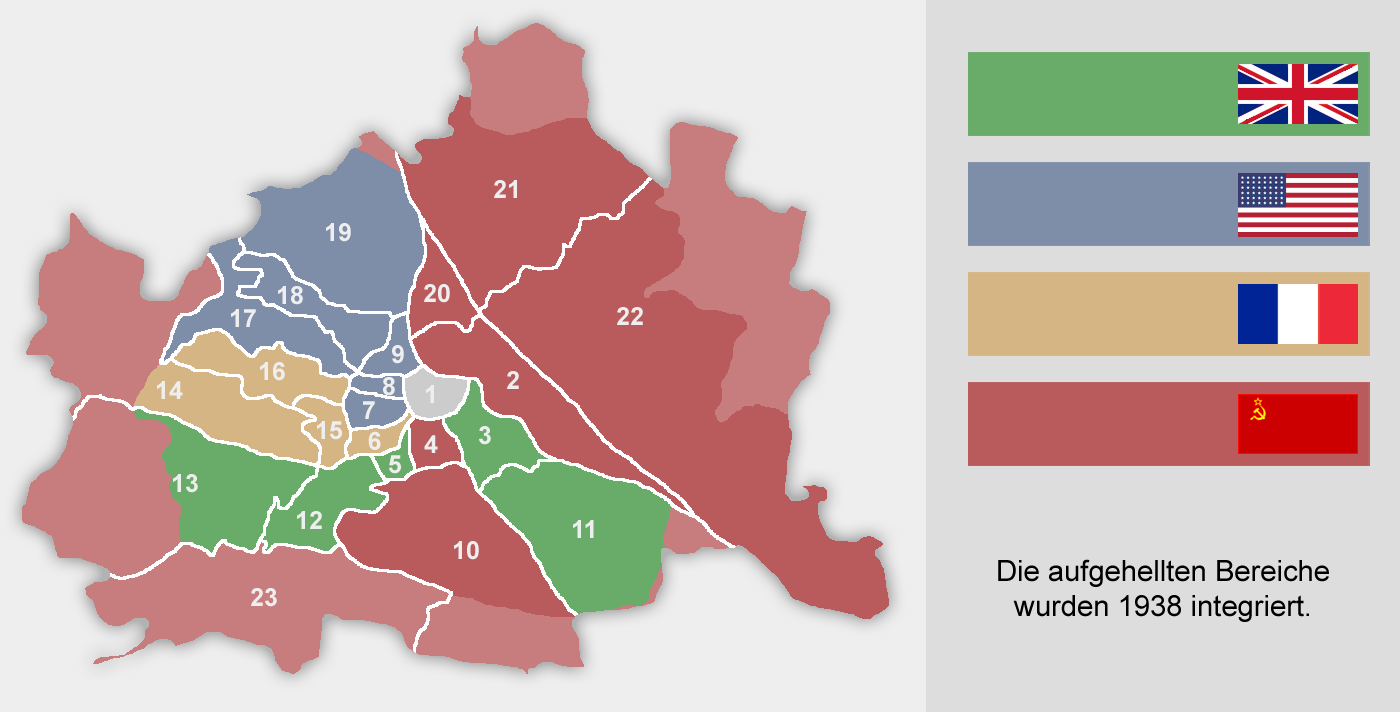
- The four sectors of occupation in Vienna
- Status: Military occupation
- Capital: Vienna
- Common languages: Austrian German (Note: It has been standardized in Austria by the Österreichisches Wörterbuch, a dictionary published by the Ministry of Education, Science and Research, since 1951.); Austro-Bavarian; Alemannic
- Religion: Christianity (Catholic, Eastern Orthodox, Protestant)
- Demonym: Austrian
- Government: Dependent federal parliamentary republic
- President
  - 1945–1950: Karl Renner
  - 1951–1955: Theodor Körner
- Chancellor
  - 1945: Karl Renner
  - 1945–1953: Leopold Figl
  - 1953–1955: Julius Raab
- History
  - Capture of Vienna: 13 April 1945
  - Established: 27 April 1945
  - End of World War II: 8 May 1945
  - Austrian State Treaty: 27 July 1955
  - Last Allies left: 25 October 1955

Population
  - 1945: 6,793,000
  - 1955: 6,947,000
- Currency: Austrian schilling
Preceded by	Succeeded by
Alpine and Danube Reichsgaue	Second Austrian Republic

At the end of World War II in Europe, Austria was occupied by the Allies and declared independence from Nazi Germany on 27 April 1945 (confirmed by the Berlin Declaration for Germany on 5 June 1945), as a result of the Vienna offensive. The occupation ended when the Austrian State Treaty came into force on 27 July 1955.

After the Anschluss in 1938, Austria had generally been recognized as part of Nazi Germany. In November 1943, however, the Allies agreed in the Declaration of Moscow that Austria would instead be regarded as the first victim of Nazi aggression—without denying Austria's role in Nazi crimes—and treated as a liberated and independent country after the war.

In the immediate aftermath of World War II, Austria was divided into four occupation zones and jointly occupied by the United Kingdom, the Soviet Union, the United States, and France. Vienna was similarly subdivided, but the central district was collectively administered by the Allied Control Council. Austria, unlike Allied-occupied Germany, had its own government from 1945 onwards.

While Germany was divided into East and West Germany in 1949, Austria remained under joint occupation of the Western Allies and the Soviet Union until 1955; its status became a controversial subject in the Cold War until the warming of relations known as the Khrushchev Thaw. After Austrian promises of perpetual neutrality, Austria was accorded full independence on 15 May 1955 and the last occupation troops left on 25 October that year.

== Background ==
At the 1943 Moscow Conference, the Soviet Union, United States, and the United Kingdom had jointly decided that the German annexation of Austria would be considered "null and void". In addition, all administrative and legal measures since 1938 would be ignored. The conference declared the intent to create a free and independent Austria after the war, but also stated that Austria had a responsibility for "participation in the war at the side of Hitlerite Germany" which could not be evaded.

== 1945–1946: First year of occupation ==
=== Soviet rule and reestablishing Austrian government ===
On 29 March 1945, Soviet commander Fyodor Tolbukhin's troops crossed the former Austrian border at Klostermarienberg in Burgenland. On 3 April, at the beginning of the Vienna Offensive, the Austrian politician Karl Renner, then living in southern Lower Austria, established contact with the Soviets. Joseph Stalin had already established a would-be future Austrian cabinet from the country's communists in exile, but Tolbukhin's telegram changed Stalin's mind in favor of Renner.

On 20 April 1945, the Soviets, without asking their Western allies, instructed Renner to form a provisional government. Seven days later Renner's cabinet took office, declared the independence of Austria from Nazi Germany, and called for the creation of a democratic state along the lines of the First Austrian Republic. Soviet acceptance of Renner was not an isolated episode; their officers re-established district administrations and appointed local mayors, frequently following the advice of the locals, even before the fighting was over.

Renner and his ministers were guarded and watched by NKVD (Note: Soviet Interior Ministry) bodyguards. One-third of State Chancellor Renner's cabinet, including crucial seats of the Secretary of State of the Interior and the Secretary of State for Education, was staffed by Austrian Communists. The Western allies suspected the establishment of a puppet state and refused to recognize Renner. The British were particularly hostile; even American President Harry Truman, who believed that Renner was a trustworthy politician rather than a token front for the Kremlin, denied him recognition. However, Renner had secured inter-party control by designating two Under-Secretaries of State in each of the ministries, appointed by the two parties not designating the Secretary of State.

As soon as Hitler's armies were pushed back into Germany, the Red Army and the NKVD began to comb the captured territories. By 23 May, they reported arrests of 268 former Red Army men, 1,208 Wehrmacht men, and 1,655 civilians. In the following weeks the British returned to the Soviets over 40,000 Cossacks who had fled to Western Austria; they were likely put to death on their return. In July and August, the Soviets brought in four regiments of NKVD troops to "mop up" Vienna and seal the Czechoslovak border.

Soviet commanders on the ground ordered the troops to stop as soon as they entered Austria. On 4 April 1945, the command issued a directive that was read to all soldiers on the front lines. The directive declared the Austria victim theory and that the Red Army had entered the country to liberate it and annihilate the German Army. For years, it said, propaganda in Nazi Germany terrorized Austrians with atrocities committed by Soviet soldiers. The directive called Nazi propaganda a lie and called on the military not to confuse Austrian civilians with German occupiers. The end of the directive reads, "be merciless towards German enslavers, but don't offend the Austrian population. Respect their traditions, families, and private property. Proudly carry the glorious title of a Red Army warrior . . . let your conduct cause respect everywhere for the Red Army." The Red Army lost 17,000 lives in the Battle of Vienna. Soviet troops engaged in systematic sexual violence against women, beginning in the first days and weeks after the Soviet victory. Repression against civilians harmed the Red Army's reputation to such an extent that on 28 September 1945 Moscow issued an order forbidding violent interrogations. Red Army morale fell as soldiers prepared to be sent home; replacement of combat units with Ivan Konev's permanent occupation force only marginally reduced 'misbehaviour'. Throughout 1945 and 1946, all levels of Soviet command tried, in vain, to contain desertion and plunder by rank and file. According to Austrian police records for 1946, "men in Soviet uniform", usually drunk, accounted for more than 90% of registered crime (in comparison, U.S. soldiers accounted for 5 to 7%). At the same time, the Soviet governors resisted the expansion and arming of the Austrian police force.

=== French, British, and American troops ===
American troops, including the 11th Armored Division, crossed the Austrian border on 26 April, followed by French and British troops on 29 April and on 8 May, respectively. Until the end of July 1945 none of the Western allies had first-hand intelligence from Eastern Austria (likewise, Renner's cabinet knew practically nothing about conditions in the West).

The first Americans arrived in Vienna in the end of July 1945, when the Soviets were pressing Renner to surrender Austrian oil fields. Americans objected and blocked the deal but ultimately the Soviets assumed control over Austrian oil in their zone. The British arrived in September.

At the end of the war, the British Eighth Army moved into Austria and became part of the occupation force. On 29 July 1945, the army was disbanded and its forces were used to form the command British Troops Austria. The new command maintained the gold crusader cross insignia of the Eighth Army.

The Allied Council of four military governors (Note: Antoine Béthouart (France), Richard McCreery (UK), Mark W. Clark (US), and Ivan Konev (USSR)) convened for its first meeting in Vienna on 12 September 1945. It refused to recognize Renner's claim of a national government but did not prevent him from extending influence into the Western zones. Renner appointed vocal anti-communist Karl Gruber as Foreign Minister and tried to reduce Communist influence. On 20 October 1945, Renner's reformed cabinet was recognized by the Western allies and received a go-ahead for the first legislative election.

=== Occupation zones ===
On 9 July 1945 the Allies agreed on the borders of their occupation zones. Movement of occupation troops ("zone swap") continued until the end of July. The French and American zones bordered those countries' zones in Germany, and the Soviet zone bordered future Warsaw Pact states:

- Vorarlberg and North Tyrol were assigned to the French Zone
- Salzburg and Upper Austria south of the Danube were assigned to the American Zone.
- East Tyrol, Carinthia, and Styria were assigned to the British Zone.
- Burgenland, Lower Austria, and the Mühlviertel area of Upper Austria, north of the Danube, were assigned to the Soviet Zone.
- Vienna was divided among all four Allies. The historical center of Vienna was declared an international zone, in which occupation forces changed every month.

In determining the occupation zones, the administrative changes made after the Anschluss were applied in the western zones (Steirisches Salzkammergut to Upper Austria and East Tyrol to Carinthia) and were disregarded in the Soviet zone (Vienna not enlarged and Burgenland re-established).

=== First general elections after the war ===
The election held on 25 November 1945 was a blow for the Communist Party of Austria which received a bit more than 5% of the vote. The coalition of Christian Democrats (ÖVP) and Social Democrats (SPÖ), (Note: The coalition of ÖVP and SPÖ has been since known as the Grand Coalition – Wilsford, p. 378 or, alternatively, the Great Coalition) backed by 90% of the votes, assumed control over the cabinet and offered the position of Federal Chancellor to Christian Democrat Julius Raab. The Soviets vetoed Raab, because he had been a member of the austrofascist Fatherland Front during the 1930s. Instead President Karl Renner, with the consent of parliament, appointed Leopold Figl, who was just barely acceptable to the Soviets. They responded with massive and coordinated expropriation of Austrian economic assets.

The Potsdam Agreement allowed confiscation of "German external assets" in Austria, and the Soviets used the vagueness of this definition to the full. In less than a year they dismantled and shipped to the East industrial equipment valued at around US$500 million. American High Commissioner Mark W. Clark vocally resisted Soviet expansionist intentions, and his reports to Washington, along with George F. Kennan's "Long Telegram", supported Truman's tough stance against the Soviets. Thus, according to Bischof, the Cold War in Austria began in the spring of 1946, one year before the outbreak of the global Cold War.

On 28 June 1946, the Allies signed the Second Control Agreement which loosened their dominance over the Austrian government. The Parliament was de facto relieved of Allied control. From now on, its decisions could be overturned only by unanimous vote by all four Allies. Soviet vetoes were routinely voided by Western opposition. Over the next nine years the country was gradually emancipated from foreign control, and evolved from a "nation under tutelage" to full independence. The government possessed its own independent vision of the future, reacting to adverse circumstances and at times turning them to their own benefit. The first allied talks on Austrian independence were held in January 1947, and deadlocked over the issue of "German assets" in Soviet possession.

== Mounting losses ==
In late 1945 and early 1946 the Allied occupation force peaked at around 150,000 Soviet, 55,000 British, 40,000 American, and 15,000 French troops. The costs of keeping these troops were levied on the Austrian government. At first, Austria had to pay the whole occupation bill; in 1946 occupation costs were capped at 35% of Austrian state expenditures, equally split between the Soviets and the Western allies.

Coincidentally with the Second Control Agreement, the Soviets changed their economic policy from outright plunder to running expropriated Austrian businesses for a profit. Austrian communists advised Stalin to nationalize the whole economy, but he deemed the proposal to be too radical. Between February and June 1946, the Soviets expropriated hundreds of businesses left in their zone. On 27 June 1946, they amalgamated these assets into the USIA, a conglomerate of over 400 enterprises. It controlled not more than 5% of Austrian economic output but possessed a substantial, or even monopolistic, share in the glass, steel, oil, and transportation industries. The USIA was weakly integrated with the rest of the Austrian economy; its products were primarily shipped to the East, its profits de facto confiscated and its taxes left unpaid by the Soviets. The Austrian government refused to recognize USIA legal title over its possessions; in retaliation, the USIA refused to pay Austrian taxes and tariffs. This competitive advantage helped to keep USIA enterprises afloat despite their mounting obsolescence. The Soviets had no intention to reinvest their profits, and USIA assets gradually decayed and lost their competitive edge. The Austrian government feared paramilitary communist gangs sheltered by the USIA and scorned it for being "an economy of exploitation in colonial style". The economy of the Soviet zone eventually reunited with the rest of the country.

South Tyrol was returned to Italy. The "thirty-second decision" of the Council of Foreign Ministers to grant South Tyrol to Italy (4 September 1945) disregarded popular opinion in Austria and the possible effects of a forced repatriation of 200,000 German-speaking Tyroleans. The decision was arguably motivated by the British desire to reward Italy, a country far more important for the containment of world communism. Renner's objections came in too late and carried too little weight to have effect. Popular and official protests continued through 1946. The signatures of 150,000 South Tyroleans did not alter the decision. South Tyrol is today an Italian autonomous province (Bolzano/Bozen) with a German-speaking majority.

== Hunger ==
In 1947, the Austrian economy, including USIA enterprises, reached 61% of pre-war levels, but it was disproportionately weak in consumer goods production (42% of pre-war levels). Food remained the worst problem. The country, according to American reports, survived 1945 and 1946 on "a near-starvation diet" with daily rations remaining below 2000 calories until the end of 1947. 65% of Austrian agricultural output and nearly all oil was concentrated in the Soviet zone, complicating the Western Allies' task of feeding the population in their own zones.

From March 1946 to June 1947, 64% of these rations were provided by the UNRRA. Heating depended on supplies of German coal shipped by the U.S. on lax credit terms. A 1946 drought further depressed farm output and hydroelectric power generation. Figl's government, the Chambers of Labor, Trade and Agriculture, and the Austrian Trade Union Federation (ÖGB) temporarily resolved the crisis in favor of tight regulation of food and labor markets. Wage increases were limited and locked to commodity prices through annual price-wage agreements. The negotiations set a model of building consensus between elected and non-elected political elites that became the basis of post-war Austrian democracy, known as Austrian Social Partnership and Austro-corporatism.

The severe winter of 1946–1947 was followed by the disastrous summer of 1947, when the potato harvest barely reached 30% of pre-war output. The food shortages were aggravated by the withdrawal of UNRRA aid, spiraling inflation, and the demoralizing failure of State Treaty talks. In April 1947, the government was unable to distribute any rations, and on 5 May Vienna was shaken by a violent food riot. Unlike earlier protests, the demonstrators, led by the Communists, called to curb the westernisation of Austrian politics. In August, a food riot in Bad Ischl turned into a pogrom of local Jews. In November, the food shortage sparked workers' strikes in British-occupied Styria. Figl's government declared that the food riots were a failed communist putsch, although later historians said this was an exaggeration.

In June 1947, the month when the UNRRA stopped shipments of food to Austria, the extent of the food crisis compelled the U.S. government to issue $300 million in food aid. In the same month Austria was invited to discuss its participation in the Marshall Plan. Direct aid and subsidies helped Austria to survive the hunger of 1947 while simultaneously depressing food prices and discouraging local farmers, thereby delaying the rebirth of Austrian agriculture.

== Marshall Plan ==
Austria finalised its Marshall Plan program in the end of 1947 and received the first tranche of Marshall Plan aid in March 1948. Heavy industry (or what was left of it) was concentrated around Linz, in the American zone, and in British-occupied Styria. Their products were in high demand in post-war Europe. Naturally, the administrators of the Marshall Plan channeled available financial aid into heavy industry controlled by the American and British forces. American military and political leaders made no secret of their intentions: Geoffrey Keyes said that "we cannot afford to let this key area (Austria) fall under the exclusive influence of the Soviet Union." The Marshall Plan was deployed primarily against the Soviet zone but it was not completely excluded: it received 8% of Marshall plan investments (compared to 25% of food and other physical commodities). The Austrian government regarded financial aid to the Soviet zone as a lifeline holding the country together. This was the only case where Marshall Plan funds were distributed in Soviet-occupied territory.

The Marshall Plan was not universally popular, especially in its initial phase. It benefited some trades such as metallurgy but depressed others such as agriculture. Heavy industries quickly recovered, from 74.7% of pre-war output in 1948 to 150.7% in 1951. American planners deliberately neglected consumer goods industries, construction trades, and small business. Their workers, almost half of the industrial workforce, suffered from rising unemployment. In 1948–1949, a substantial share of Marshall Plan funds was used to subsidize imports of food. American money effectively raised real wages: the grain price was about one-third of the world price, while agriculture remained in ruins. Marshall Plan aid gradually removed many of the causes of popular unrest that shook the country in 1947, but Austria remained dependent on food imports.

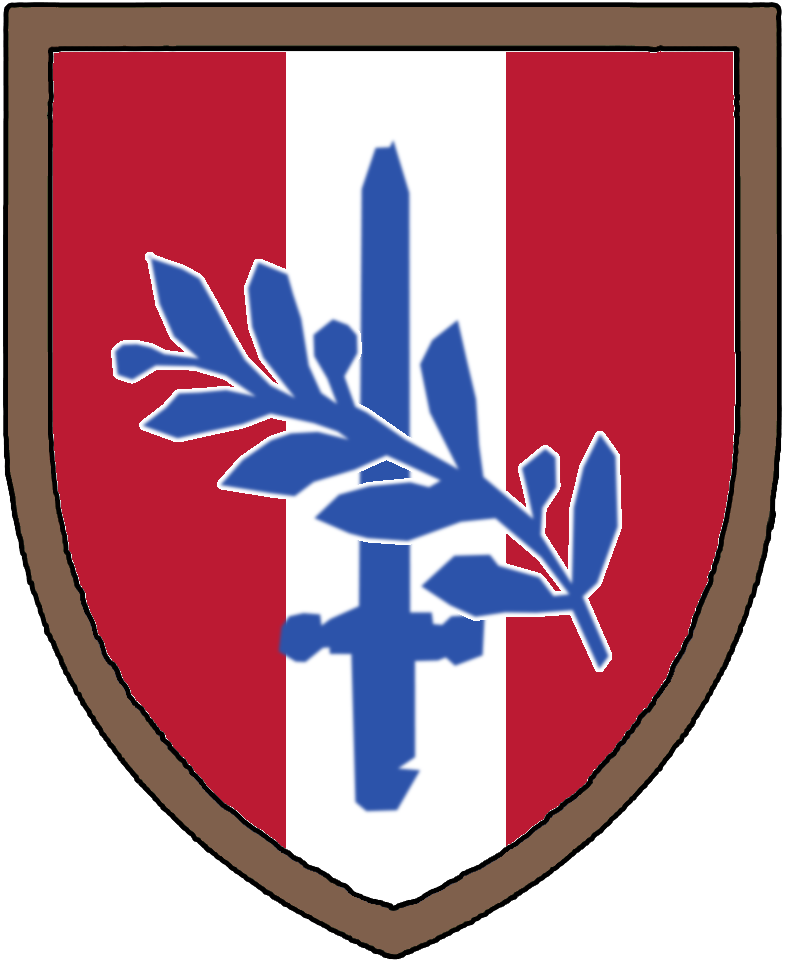
Patch of the Austria Occupation Forces

The second stage of the Marshall Plan, which began in 1950, concentrated on productivity of the economy. According to Michael J. Hogan, "in the most profound sense, it involved the transfer of attitudes, habits and values as well, indeed a whole way of life that Marshall planners associated with progress in the marketplace of politics and social relationships as much as they did with industry and agriculture." The program, as intended by American lawmakers, targeted improvement in factory-level productivity, labor-management relations, free trade unions and introduction of modern business practices. The Economic Cooperation Administration, which operated until December 1951, distributed around $300 million in technical assistance and attempted steering the Austrian social partnership (political parties, labor unions, business associations, and government) in favor of productivity and growth instead of redistribution and consumption.

Their efforts were thwarted by the Austrian practice of making decisions behind closed doors. The Americans struggled to change it in favor of open, public discussion. They took a strong anti-cartel stance, appreciated by the Socialists, and pressed the government to remove anti-competition legislation but ultimately they were responsible for the creation of the vast monopolistic public sector of the economy (and thus politically benefiting the Socialists).

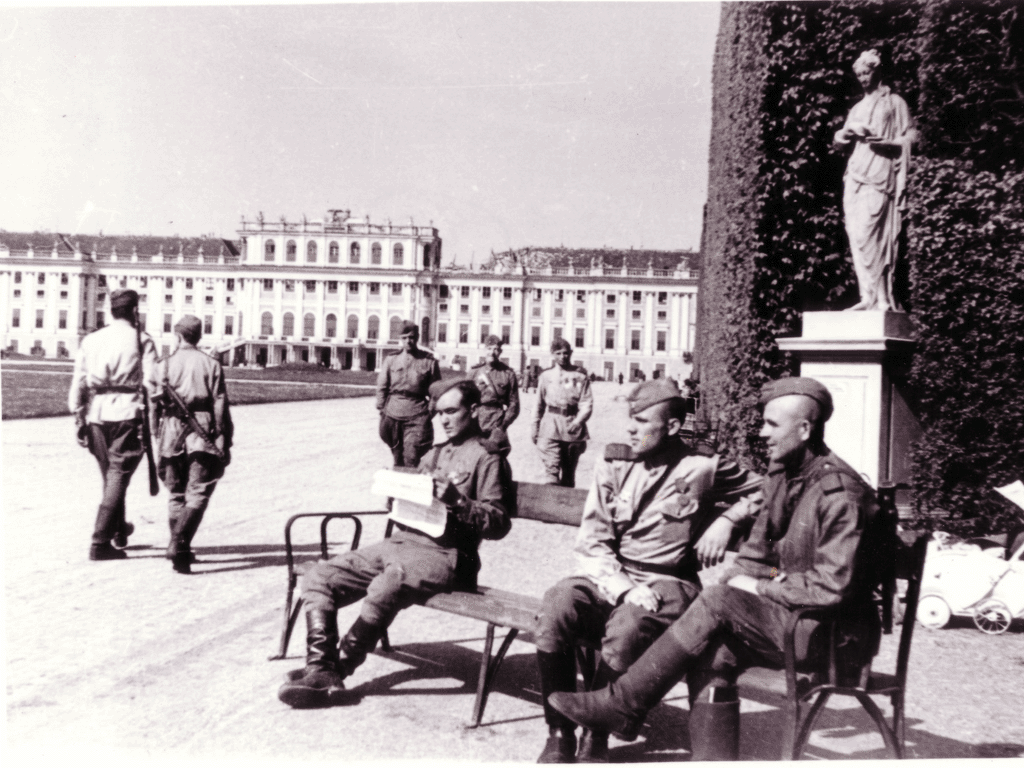
Soviet troops in the Schönbrunn Palace gardens, 1945

According to Bischof, "no European nation benefited more from the Marshall Plan than Austria." Austria received nearly $1 billion through the Marshall Plan, and half a billion in humanitarian aid. The Americans also refunded all occupation costs charged in 1945–1946, around $300 million. In 1948–1949, Marshall Plan aid contributed 14% of national income, the highest ratio of all involved countries. (Note: The Netherlands and Ireland were the second and third with 10.8% and 7.8%.) Per capita, aid amounted to $132 compared to $19 for the Germans but Austria also paid more war reparations per capita than any other Axis state or territory. Total war reparations taken by the Soviet Union including withdrawn USIA profits, looted property and the final settlement agreed in 1955, are estimated between $1.54 billion and $2.65 billion (Eisterer: 2 to 2.5 billion).

== Cold War ==
The British had been quietly arming gendarmes, the so-called B-Gendarmerie, since 1945 and discussed the creation of a proper Austrian military in 1947. The Americans feared that Vienna could be the scene of another Berlin Blockade. They set up and filled emergency food dumps, and prepared to airlift supplies to Vienna while the government created a backup base in Salzburg. The American command secretly trained the soldiers of an underground Austrian military at a rate of 200 men a week. The B-Gendarmerie knowingly hired Wehrmacht veterans and VdU members; the denazification of Austria's 537,000 registered Nazis had largely ended in 1948.

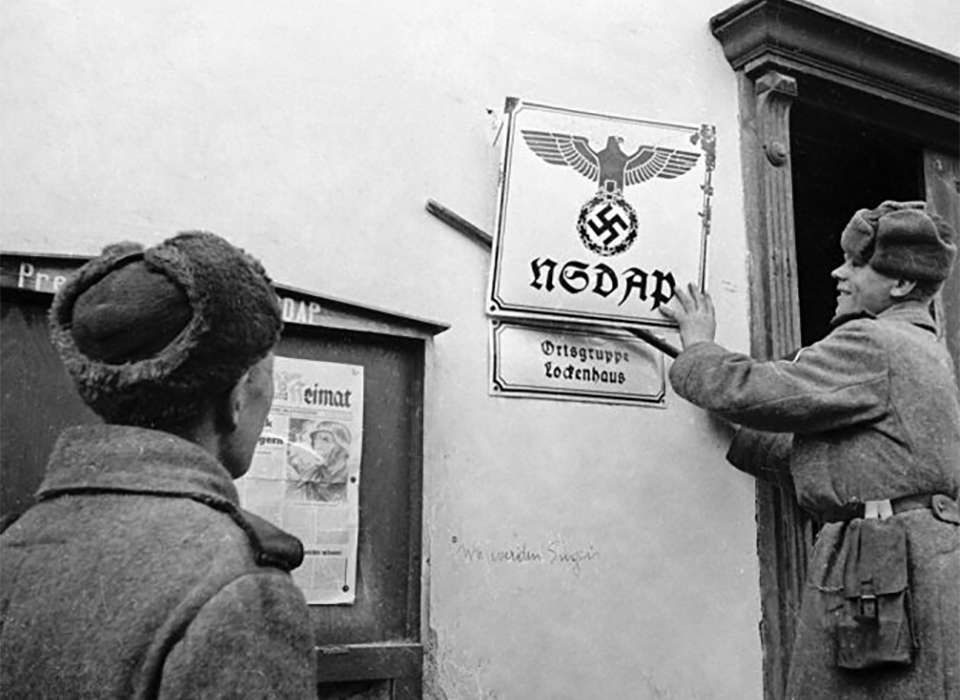
Soviet soldiers taking down a Nazi sign in Austria

Austrian communists appealed to Stalin to partition their country along the German model, but in February 1948 Andrei Zhdanov vetoed the idea: Although Zhdanov expressed support for a "peaceful transition to socialism" in Austria, the continuing talks on Austrian independence stalled in 1948 but progressed to a "near breakthrough" in 1949: the Soviets lifted most of their objections, and the Americans suspected foul play. The Pentagon was convinced that the withdrawal of Western troops would leave the country open to Soviet invasion along the Czechoslovak model. Clark insisted that before their departure the United States must secretly train and arm the core of a future military. Serious secret training of the B-Gendarmerie began in 1950 but soon stalled due to US defense budget cuts in 1951. Gendarmes were trained primarily as an anti-coup police force, but they also studied Soviet combat practice and counted on cooperation with the Yugoslavs in case of a Soviet invasion.

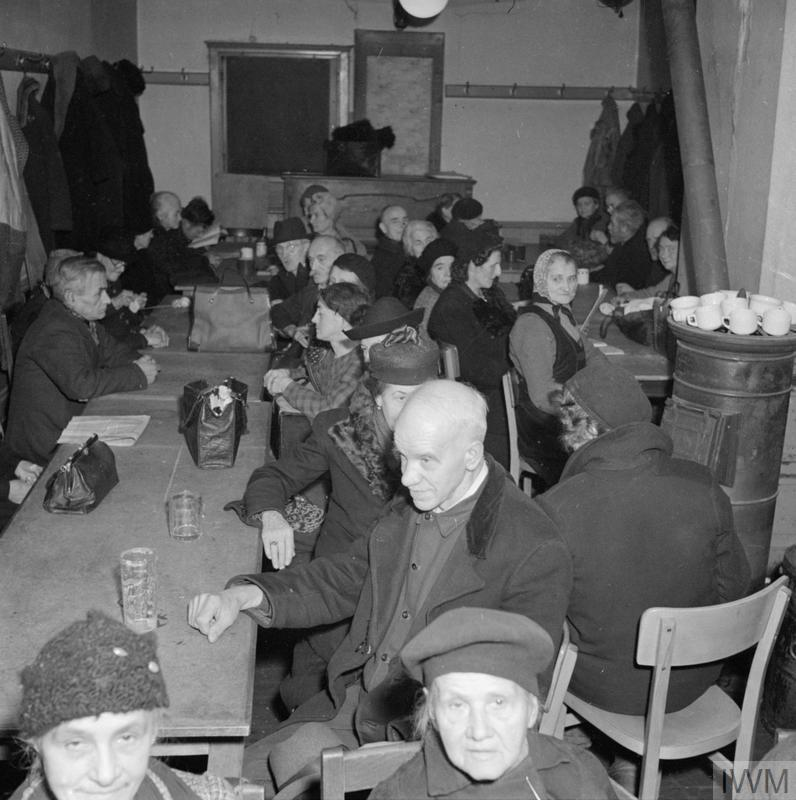
Elderly civilians in a "warming room" in the British zone of Vienna, c. 1945–47.

Although in the fall of 1950 the Western powers replaced their military representatives with civilian diplomats, strategically, the situation became gloomier than ever. The Korean War experience persuaded Washington that Austria might become "Europe's Korea" and sped up rearmament of the "secret ally". International tension was coincident with a severe internal economic and social crisis. The planned withdrawal of American food subsidies spelled a sharp drop in real wages. The government and the unions deadlocked in negotiations, and gave the communists the opportunity to organize the 1950 Austrian general strikes which became the gravest threat since the 1947 food riots. The communists stormed and took over ÖGB offices and disrupted railroad traffic but failed to recruit sufficient public support and had to admit defeat. The Soviets and the Western allies did not dare to actively intervene in the strikes. The strike intensified the militarization of Western Austria, with active input from France and the CIA. Despite the strain of the Korean War, by the end of 1952 the American "Stockpile A" (A for Austria) in France and Germany amassed 227 thousand tons of materiel earmarked for Austrian armed forces.

== Détente ==
The death of Joseph Stalin and the Korean Armistice Agreement defused the standoff, and the country was rapidly, but not completely, demilitarized. After the Soviet Union had relieved Austria of the need to pay for the cost of their reduced army of 40,000 men, the British and French followed suit and reduced their forces to a token presence. Finally, the Soviets replaced their military governor with a civilian ambassador. The former border between Eastern and Western Austria became a demarcation line.

Chancellor Julius Raab, elected in April 1953, removed pro-Western foreign minister Gruber and steered Austria to a more neutral policy. Raab carefully probed the Soviets about resuming the talks on independence, but until February 1955 it remained contingent on a solution to the larger German problem. The Western strategy of rearming West Germany, formulated in the Paris Agreement, was unacceptable to the Soviets. They responded with a counter-proposal for a pan-European security system that, they said, could speed up reunification of Germany, and again the West suspected foul play. Eisenhower, in particular, had "an utter lack of confidence in the reliability and integrity of the men in the Kremlin... the Kremlin is pre-empting the right to speak for the small nations of the world".

In January 1955, Soviet diplomats Andrey Gromyko, Vladimir Semenov and Georgy Pushkin secretly advised Vyacheslav Molotov to unlink the Austrian and German issues, expecting that the new talks on Austria would delay ratification of the Paris Agreement. Molotov publicly announced the new Soviet initiative on 8 February. He put forward three conditions for Austrian independence: neutrality, no foreign military bases, and guarantees against a new Anschluss.

== Independence ==
Soviet foreign minister Vyacheslav Molotov (left) meeting Austrian Chancellor Julius Raab (right) in Moscow, April 1955

In March 1955, Molotov clarified his plan through a series of consultations with ambassador Norbert Bischoff: Austria was no longer hostage to the German issue. Molotov invited Raab to Moscow for bilateral negotiations that, if successful, had to be followed by a Four Powers conference. By this time Paris Agreements were ratified by France and Germany, although the British and Americans suspected a trap of the same sort that Hitler had set for Schuschnigg in 1938. Anthony Eden and others wrote that the Moscow initiative was merely a cover-up for another incursion into German matters. The West erroneously thought that the Soviets valued Austria primarily as a military asset, when in reality it was a purely political issue. Austria's military significance had been largely devalued by the end of the Soviet-Yugoslav conflict and the upcoming signing of the Warsaw Pact.

These fears did not materialize, and Raab's visit to Moscow (12–15 April) was a breakthrough. Moscow agreed that Austria would be free no later than 31 December. (Note: Molotov at first demanded six months to withdraw the troops, while Raab pressed for three months. In the end they agreed on "three months from signing the Treaty, but no later than December 31") Austrians agreed to pay for the "German assets" and oil fields left by the Soviets, mostly in kind; (Note: $150 million for German assets paid with goods, plus 10 million tons of oil and $2 million in cash The Kremlin proposed to spread oil shipments over six years through 1961, taking 50% of Austrian output, but at the request of Austria the schedule was extended to 10 years (to 1965)) "the real prize was to be neutrality on the Swiss model." (Note: According to Sergeev, who was present at the negotiations, Molotov's phrase about the Swiss model was a quote from a speech delivered by John Foster Dulles in Berlin on 13 February 1954.) Molotov also promised the release and repatriation of Austrians imprisoned in the Soviet Union.

Western powers were stunned. British diplomat and signatory to the treaty, Geoffrey Wallinger reported to London that the deal "was far too good to be true, to be honest". But it proceeded as had been agreed in Moscow and on 15 May 1955 Antoine Pinay, Harold Macmillan, Molotov, John Foster Dulles, and Figl signed the Austrian State Treaty in Vienna. It came into force on 27 July and on 25 October the country was free of occupying troops. The next day, Austria's parliament enacted a Declaration of Neutrality, whereby Austria would never join a military alliance such as NATO or the Warsaw Pact, or allow foreign troops to be based within Austria. The Soviets left in Vienna the large Soviet War Memorial and to the new government a symbolic cache of small arms, artillery, and T-34 tanks; the Americans left a far greater gift of "Stockpile A" assets. The only political spokesperson who was publicly upset about the outcome was West German Chancellor Konrad Adenauer, who called the affair die ganze österreichische Schweinerei ("the whole Austrian scandal") and threatened the Austrians with "sending Hitler's remains home to Austria".

== High commissioners ==
American zone:

- Mark W. Clark: 5 July 1945 – 16 May 1947
- Geoffrey Keyes: 17 May 1947 – 19 September 1950
- Walter J. Donnelly: 20 September 1950 – 17 July 1952
- Llewellyn Thompson: 17 July 1952 – 27 July 1955

British zone:

- Richard McCreery: July 1945 – March 1946
- James Steele: March 1946 – October 1947
- Alexander Galloway: October 1947 – 1 January 1950
- John Winterton: 1 January 1950 – 1 August 1950
- Harold Caccia: 1 August 1950 – 5 February 1954
- Geoffrey Wallinger: 5 February 1954 – 27 July 1955

French zone:

- Antoine Béthouart: 8 July 1945 – September 1950
- Jean Payart: September 1950 – October 1954
- Jean Chauvel October 1954 – February 1955
- Roger Lalouette: February 1955 – June 1955
- François Seydoux de Clausonne: 3 June 1955 – 27 July 1955

Soviet zone:

Military Commander

- Fyodor Tolbukhin: 13 April 1945 – July 1945

High Commissioners

- Ivan Konev: July 1945 – 25 April 1946
- Vladimir Kurasov: 10 May 1946 – 2 April 1949
- Vladimir Sviridov: 4 May 1949 – 7 June 1953
- Ivan Ilyichev: 7 June 1953 – 27 July 1955

== See also ==
- Aftermath of World War II
- Allied-occupied Germany
- American food policy in occupied Germany
- Soviet occupations
- The Third Man
