= Vyacheslav Kochemasov =

Soviet diplomat (1918–1998)

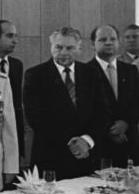
- Kochemasov in 1985

9th Ambassador of the Soviet Union to East Germany
- In office 12 June 1983 – 24 May 1990
- Premier: Nikolai Tikhonov
- Preceded by: Pyotr Abrasimov
- Succeeded by: Gennady Shikin

Deputy Chairman of the Council of Ministers of the RSFSR
- In office 16 July 1962 – 13 June 1983

Personal details
- Born: Vyacheslav Ivanovich Kochemasov; 18 September 1918 Gagino, Sergachsky Uyezd, Nizhny Novgorod Governorate, RSFSR
- Died: 25 August 1998 (aged 79) Moscow, Russia
- Party: CPSU
- Spouse: Ziniaida Nicolaevna Kochemasova (1921–2008)
- Occupation: Diplomat

Vyacheslav Ivanovich Kochemasov (Russian: Вячеслав Иванович Кочемасов; 18 September 1918 – 25 August 1998) was a Soviet and Russian diplomat and politician.

He was the Soviet Ambassador to East Germany from 1983 till 1990. His term included the fall of the Berlin Wall in November 1989 which effectively heralded the end, in 1990, of the German Democratic Republic. The Soviet government played a key role in this process.

== Life and career ==
Kochemasov became a member of the Communist Party in 1942. Directly after the end of World War II he became an official in the international section of the Young Communist League (Komsomol). After that, between 1955 and 1960, he worked at the Soviet Embassy in East Berlin.

From 1966 until 1983, he was deputy Chairman of the Council of Ministers for the RSFSR. At the same time he held leadership positions in the "All-union society for protecting Culture and Historical Monuments" and with the Rossotrudnichestvo. Between 1966 and 1983, he was listed as a candidate for membership of the Central Committee: between June 1983 and June 1990 he was a full member of it.

In 1983, Yuri Andropov, the new Soviet leader, appointed Kochemasov to succeed Pyotr Abrasimov as Soviet Ambassador to East Germany. In 1985 a new generation took over at the Kremlin as Mikhail Gorbachev became Soviet Party Secretary in March 1985. Gorbachev took a substantially changed approach to relations between Moscow and East Berlin, but Vyacheslav Kochemasov nevertheless remained in his ambassadorial post for more than five of the Perestroika-Glasnost years that ensued.

During the evening of 9 November 1989, as the Berlin Wall came down, there was widespread speculation as to how the Soviet Ambassador to the German Democratic Republic might react. Vyacheslav Kochemasov did nothing. It was later reported that on the evening of 9 November, he had tried, without success, to telephone Mikhail Gorbachev and then the Soviet Foreign Minister, Eduard Shevardnadze, for instructions. During the reunification process Kochemasov continued to represent his country's interests.

In this connection it was Kochemasov who on 16 April 1990 handed over to East Germany's recently elected prime minister, Lothar de Maizière, the so-called "Non-paper" which set out, unofficially and in an informal manner, the Soviet Union's eleven ground-rules for the rapidly unfolding reunification of East and West Germany. The note recorded that Article 23 of the East German constitution clearly rejected a union of the two German states and also rejected membership of NATO for a reunited Germany.

From June 1990, Kochemasov returned to Moscow to retire. His successor as Soviet Ambassador to East Germany was Gennadi Schikin.

Kochemasov died on 25 August 1998, aged 79, in Moscow. He is buried, with his wife Ziniaida Nicolaevna, a highly qualified medical doctor, in the Troyekurovskoye Cemetery on the western edge of Moscow.

== The ambassador's insights ==
=== On tensions in East German government during the Perestroika years ===
The extent to which East Germany's leader Erich Honecker and his inner circle felt unsettled and undermined by on-going Perestroika in the Soviet Union became more widely known after Honecker himself had retired. In 1992 Kochemasov gave a remarkable interview to the western press, disclosing that as far back as 1986 a senior member of the East German government, Werner Krolikowski had told him, in confidence, that the situation in the country's SED Politburo had become "unbearable": policy decisions were totally driven by dogma, there was no longer any discussion, there was an absurd level of centralisation and an utterly implausible communications strategy. Something must be done: the leader must be replaced.

=== On the limitations imposed on a Warsaw bloc leader's autonomy by the Brezhnev Doctrine ===
The year before he died Kochemasov gave another western press interview in which he concentrated on the events of November 1989 and their aftermath. He confirmed that the Brezhnev Doctrine had left an East German head of state with surprisingly little autonomy. He recalled that he had been invited to interpret an instruction from Soviet leader Mikhail Gorbachev that long running demonstrations in Leipzig should be brought under control, regardless of how it was done. The East German leader Erich Honecker and his successor Egon Krenz were unable to agree whether Gorbachev's instruction amounted to a mandate to suppress the Leipzig demonstration using force. Kochemasov, representing the Soviet viewpoint had immediately supported the Krenz interpretation that force should on no account be used against the Leipzig demonstrators. He had also, for the avoidance of any doubt, then lost no time in communicating the same interpretation to Soviet Army commanders based in East Germany.

=== On the Gorbachev strategy over East Germany ===
The same interview included discussion on whether prosecuting of the country's former leaders for the killings of people trying to escape from East Germany represented a treaty breach by German Chancellor Helmut Kohl. Kochemasov believed that court actions against former East German leaders represented a breach of a gentlemen's agreement between Kohl and Gorbachev, implying that Gorbachev had been too trusting in his dealings with the West German leader. But as far as Kochemasov knew there had been no express treaty provision or other documented agreement covering the issue.

At the end of the interview, when pushed for an opinion, Kochemasov confirmed that in terms of the fundamental interests of the Soviet Union, he believed that Gorbachev had shown excessive and unnecessary weakness over German reunification.

== Awards ==
- 2 Orders of Lenin
- 2 Orders of the Red Banner of Labour
- Jubilee Medal "In Commemoration of the 100th Anniversary of the Birth of Vladimir Ilyich Lenin"
- Medal "Veteran of Labour"
