= Vladimir Semyonov (politician) =

Soviet diplomat and politician

Vladimir Semyonov Владимир Семёнов
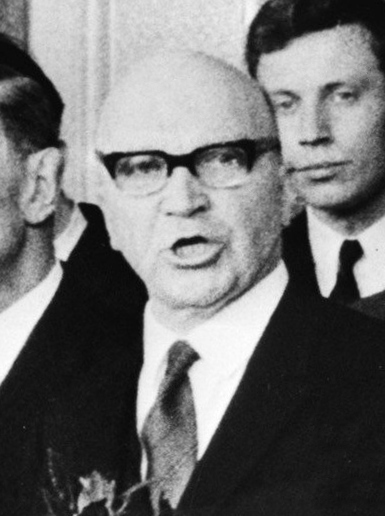

Ambassador to East Germany
- In office 29 May 1953 – 14 July 1954
- Preceded by: Ivan Ilyichev
- Succeeded by: Georgy Pushkin

Deputy Minister of Foreign Affairs
- In office March 1955 – November 1978

Ambassador to West Germany
- In office 10 November 1978 – 15 April 1986
- Preceded by: Valentin Falin
- Succeeded by: Yulii Kvitsinsky

Personal details
- Born: 16 February 1911 Krasnoslobodskoye, Kirsanovsky Uyezd, Tambov Governorate, Russian Empire
- Died: 18 December 1992 (aged 81) Cologne, Germany
- Party: Communist Party of the Soviet Union
- Education: MIFLM
- Profession: Diplomat, civil servant

Vladimir Semyonovich Semyonov (Russian: Влади́мир Семёнович Семёнов; 16 February 1911, Krasnoslobodskoye – 18 December 1992, Cologne) was a Soviet diplomat most notable for his military administration in Eastern Germany during the Soviet occupation after World War II. He was instrumental in the creation of the GDR, and served as the first Soviet ambassador to East Germany.

== Career as Soviet diplomat ==
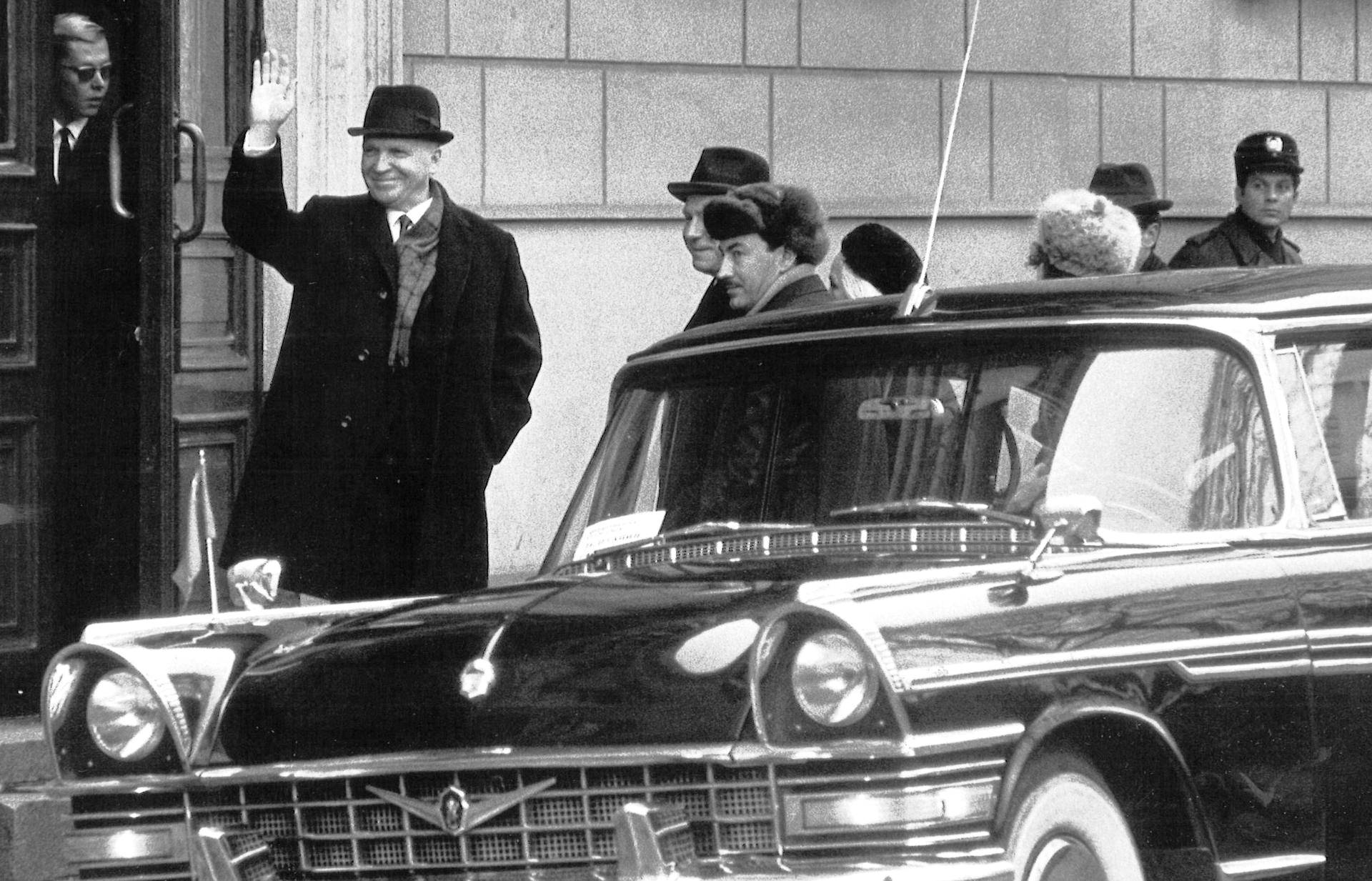
Semyonov waving his hand in front of the Smolna building in Helsinki, Finland in November 1969

- 1939 – employee of the Ministry of Foreign Affairs (MID)
- 1939–1940 – advisor of Soviet Plenipotentiary Representation in Lithuania
- 1940–1941 – counsellor of the Soviet Embassy in Nazi Germany
- 1941–1942 – executive of the Third European Department of the MID
- 1942–1945 – counsellor of the Soviet Mission in Sweden
- 1945–1946 – deputy to Political Counsellor of the Soviet Military Administration in Germany
- 1946–1949 – Political Counsellor of the Soviet Military Administration in Germany
- 1949–1953 – Political Counsellor of the Soviet Control Committee in Germany
- 1953 – Senior Executive, Deputy Chief, Chief of the Third European Department of the Ministry of Foreign Affairs, member of Ministry Board of the MID.
- 1953–1954 – Chief Commissar of USSR in Germany and an ambassador to the GDR;
- 1954–1955 – Executive of the Third European Department of the Ministry of Foreign Affairs
- 1955–1978 – Deputy Minister of Foreign Affairs
- 1968–1978 – Chief of the Soviet delegation at the Soviet-American negotiations on reduction of strategic weapons in Helsinki, Vienna, Geneva. Prepared the 1973 SALT-1 and 1978 SALT-2 Treaties for signing by General Secretaries Leonid Brezhnev and Presidents Gerald Ford and Jimmy Carter.
- 1978–1986 – Ambassador to West Germany
- 1986–1991 – Foreign Ministry Ambassador at Large, Counsellor to the Foreign Minister

=== Start of diplomatic career ===
Semyonov owed his entry into diplomatic service to Vyacheslav Molotov. In the summer of 1939, at a meeting of the heads of the university and high schools departments of Marxism-Leninism in Moscow, Semyonov made a report on the study of Stalin’s "Short Course in the History of the All-Union Communist Party (Bolsheviks)". The People's Commissar for Foreign Affairs V. M. Molotov was present in the meeting room, and he liked the report. After that, Semyonov was ordered to be transferred from the Rostov Pedagogical Institute where he taught to Moscow, to be at the disposal of the People's Commissariat of Foreign Affairs.

== Awards and honors ==
- Three Orders of the Red Banner of Labour (3 November 1944, 15 February 1961, 27 December 1977)
- Order of the Patriotic War, 1st class (5 November 1945)
- Three Orders of Lenin (24 June 1948, 31 December 1966, 16 February 1981)
- Order of the Badge of Honour (30 October 1954)
- Order of the October Revolution (16 February 1971)
- Order of Friendship of Peoples (14 February 1986)
