= Pyotr Abrasimov =

Soviet diplomat and politician

- Пётр Абрасимов
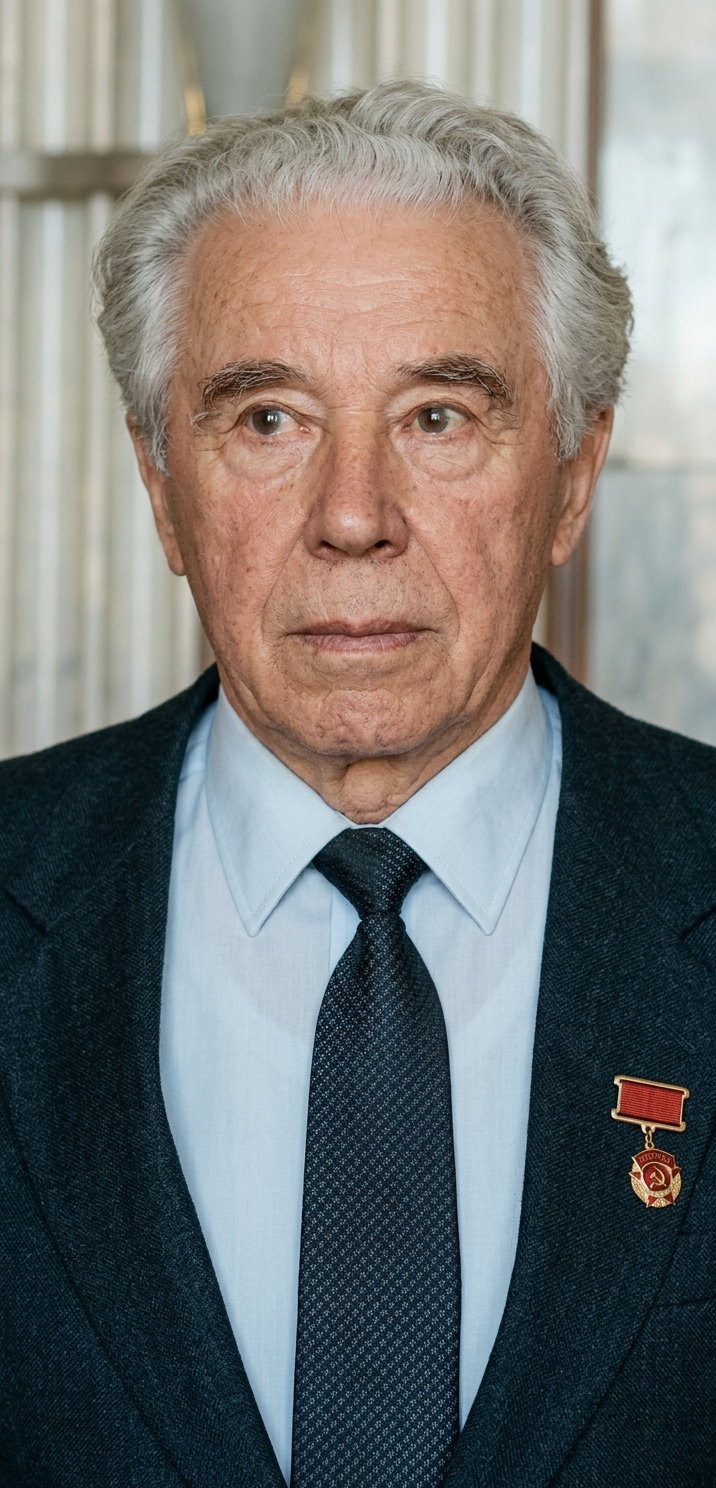
- Abrasimov in 1983

Soviet Ambassador to Japan
- In office 25 February 1985 – 13 May 1986
- Preceded by: Vladimir Pavlov
- Succeeded by: Nikolai Solovyov

Chairman of the State Committee for Foreign Tourism
- In office 31 May 1983 – 27 February 1985
- Preceded by: Sergei Nikitin
- Succeeded by: Vladimir Pavlov

Soviet Ambassador to East Germany
- In office 7 March 1975 – 12 June 1983
- Preceded by: Mikhail Yefremov
- Succeeded by: Vyacheslav Kochemasov
- In office 15 December 1962 – 18 September 1971
- Preceded by: Mikhail Pervukhin
- Succeeded by: Mikhail Yefremov

Soviet Ambassador to France
- In office 18 September 1971 – 9 April 1973
- Preceded by: Valerian Zorin
- Succeeded by: Stepan Chervonenko

Soviet Ambassador to Madagascar
- In office 20 December 1972 – 9 April 1973
- Preceded by: Position established
- Succeeded by: Stepan Chervonenko

First Secretary of Smolensk Obkom
- In office 11 February 1961 – December 1962
- Preceded by: Pavel Doronin
- Succeeded by: Nikolai Kalmyk

Soviet Ambassador to the Polish People's Republic
- In office 3 October 1957 – 14 February 1961
- Preceded by: Panteleimon Ponomarenko
- Succeeded by: Averky Aristov

Personal details
- Born: 16 May 1912 Boguszewsk, Mogilev Governorate, Russian Empire
- Died: 16 February 2009 (aged 96) Moscow, Russia
- Party: CPSU
- Education: Higher Party School
- Alma mater: Belarusian State University

Military service
- Unit: Central Headquarters of the Partisan Movement

Pyotr Andreievitch Abrasimov (Belarusian: Пё́тр Андрэ́евіч Абра́сімаў, Russian: Пётр Андреевич Абрасимов; 16 May 1912–16 February 2009) was a Soviet politician who became a career diplomat. He served his country as ambassador successively in China, France, Poland and East Germany.

== Life ==
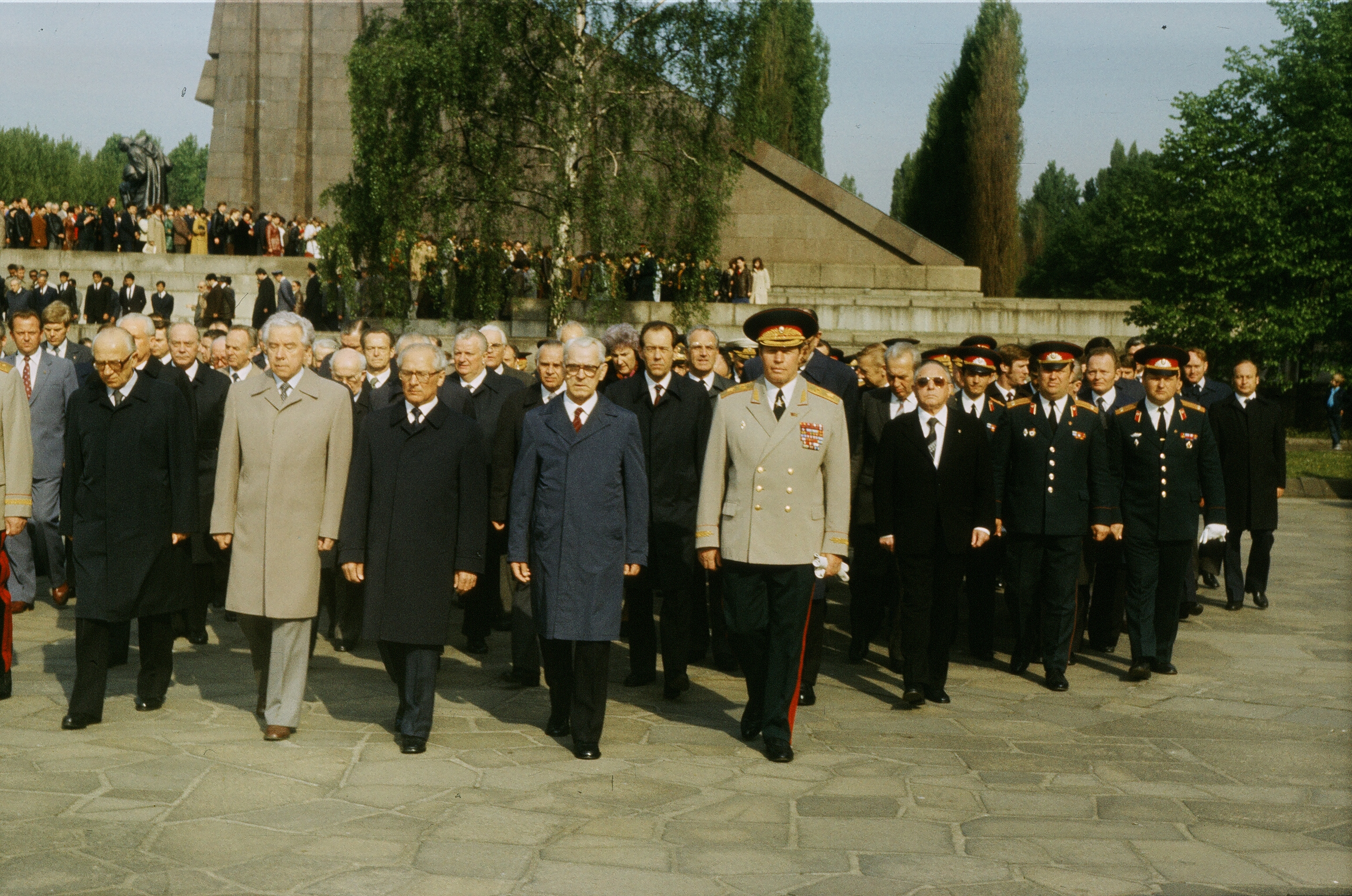
Abrasimov as Soviet Ambassador to the GDR at the wreath-laying ceremony in Treptower Park. East Berlin, May 8, 1982

Abrasimov was born in Boguszewsk, a recently expanded but still small village in the eastern part of Belarus. The village's economic importance had been much enhanced when the local land-owner agreed to the erection of a station along the new railway line, which had opened in 1902, linking Vitebsk, Žlobin and Orsha to the rapidly expanding rail network of the Russian Empire (which included Belarus). Pyotr Andreievitch's father was a farmer who fought in the First World War and in the ensuing Civil War that followed it in the Russian Empire. He was killed in fighting near Orsha while a member of a Red Guard battalion, leaving his widow to bring up Pyotr and his sister. In 1933 Abrasimov's own specialty had become the electro-technical industrial sector. By 1939, however, he was attending the Belarusian State University in Minsk, studying history.

It was only in 1940, as the worst of the Stalinist purges were coming to an end, that he joined the Communist Party. Till 1941 Abrasimov worked in government and trades union institutions, after which he became an officer in the Red Army and, during the Great Patriotic War, an officer in the Belarusian partisan movement which at the time was operating behind German lines with approximately 35,000 men. By the end of the war he had earned four Soviet military medals. Between 1946 and 1952 he served as permanent representative of the Byelorussian Soviet Socialist Republic Ministerial Council in the Council of Ministers of the Soviet Union. In this position he worked directly under Alexei Kosygin and was able to preside over a period of strong economic recovery for Belarus, with the establishment of tractor and automobile plants as well as the creation of major agricultural enterprises. He subsequently became first deputy president of the Belorussian Council of Ministers and Secretary of the Communist Party Central Committee. At the same time he resumed his studies in history at Minsk University.

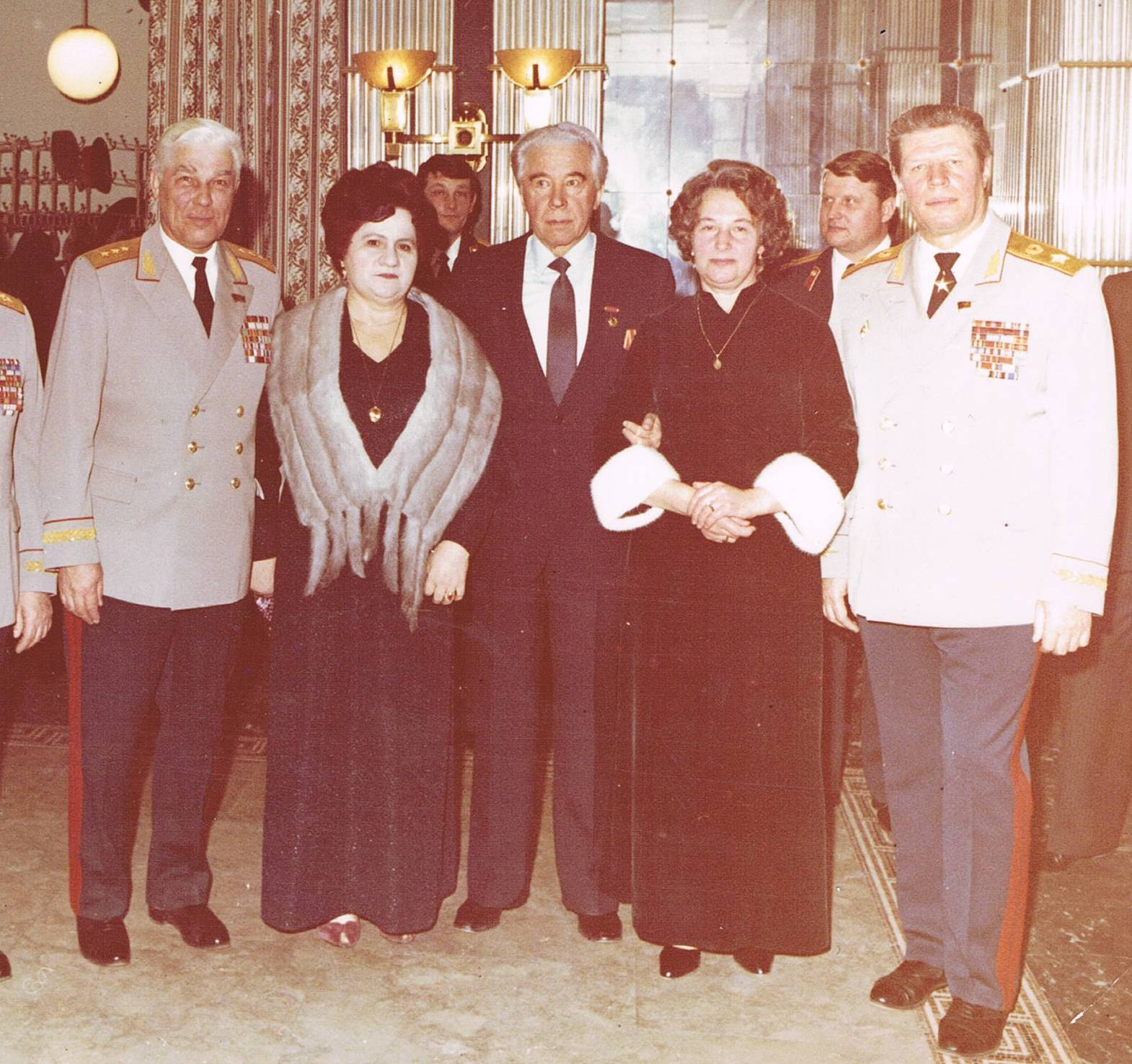
Member of the Supreme Council of the Group of Soviet Forces in Germany Ivan Gubin with his wife, Ambassador Abrasimov, M. I. Zaitseva and Commander-in-Chief Mikhail Zaitsev. East Berlin, 1981

Between 1950 and 1958 Abrasimov was a member of the Supreme Soviet of the Soviet Union. Abrasimov's career in the diplomatic service began in 1950 or 1956 with a posting to China. From 1957 till 1961 he was the Soviet ambassador to Poland. His term in Warsaw directly followed the rehabilitation of Władysław Gomułka who earlier in the 1950s been disgraced, imprisoned and expelled from the party for "right wing-reactionary deviation" but who in 1956 became First Secretary of the Polish Party. Abrasimov and Gomułka formed a good working relationship of mutual trust.

In 1961, to the surprise of many in the Soviet Foreign Ministry, Abrasimov was recalled from Warsaw and appointed as First Secretary of the party committee in the then relatively underdeveloped Smolensk region. The background was a scathing speech by the national leader, Nikita Khrushchev, concerning the collapse of agriculture in various regions including that around Smolensk. Abrasimov knew the region, and he had only respect for its hardworking people. He listened in silence to Krushchev's critical speech to a Central Committee plenum, but directly afterwards asked to be appointed to the Smolensk Regional Party Committee First Secretary job: his request was unhesitatingly granted, and he energetically devoted himself to addressing the matters highlighted by Krushchev.

At the end of 1962 he returned to his ambassadorial career, appointed to head up the Soviet Union's important diplomatic mission in the German Democratic Republic in succession to Mikhail Pervukhin, taking up his appointment at the start of 1963. Building on an approach he had developed during his time in Warsaw, he proved a new kind of post-Stalin Soviet ambassador. He took a relatively high-profile approach, visiting factories and exhibitions, and appearing on television. He secretly met several times with Willy Brandt, then Mayor of West Berlin at the Swedish Embassy in Berlin in 1966. The meetings were mediated by the Swedish consul general Sven Backlund. Media reports appeared in the west suggesting that he was a consummate actor, and his involvement in negotiating the four-power agreement over the future of Berlin which he personally signed on behalf of the Soviet Union 3 September 1971 left him far better known in West Germany than the Soviet ambassador to West Germany. Abrasimov proved highly quotable, and attracted attention with protests against Willy Brandt's Ostpolitik ("No rose without the thorns" / "Keine Rose ohne Dornen").

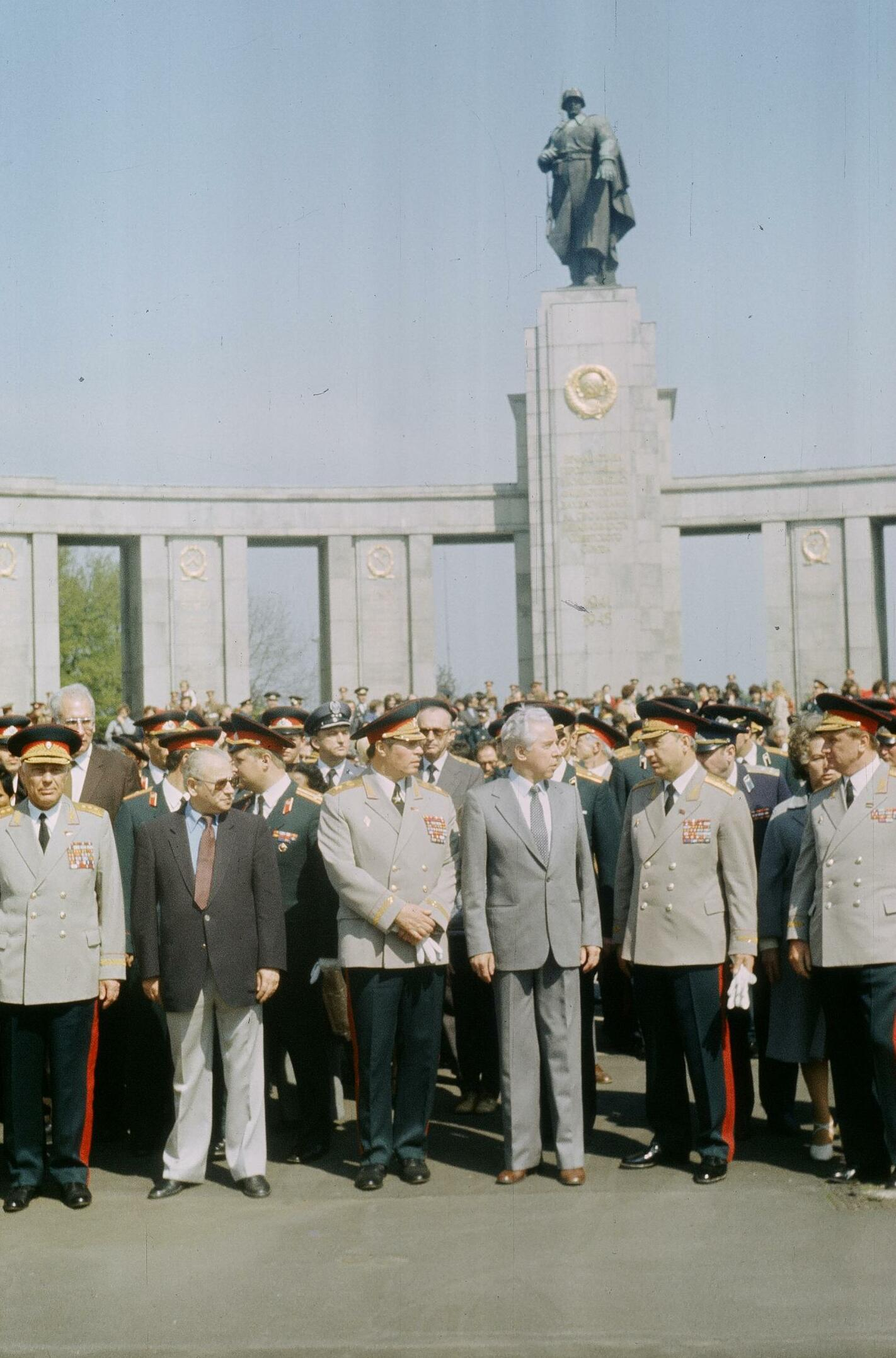
Abrasimov with the GSFG command at the Monument to Fallen Soviet Soldiers in Tiergarten, West Berlin on May 8, 1982

On 12 May 1971 the Warsaw Pact War Council convened in East Berlin, followed by a larger than usual series of summer military exercises by the alliance member states. Abrasimov was the only civilian to participate in these exercises. Later in 1971 he received a communication from Leonid Brezhnev who had scheduled a visit to Paris later in the year. The Soviet invasion of Czechoslovakia in 1968 was relatively fresh in the minds of the French political establishment, and Abrasimov was instructed to take over the Soviet ambassadorship there to prepare for the Brezhnev visit. He remained in Paris for two years after which he returned to Moscow and took a position as a department head with the Party Central Committee.

In 1975 he was sent back to Berlin where he served a second stint as Soviet ambassador to the German Democratic Republic, remaining in post this time till 1983. His years as ambassador were not without Soviet-East German tensions. During the early 1960s the Soviet leader, Nikita Khrushchev was interested in exploring a less confrontational relationship with the west while the East German leader, Walter Ulbricht, remained uncompromisingly hard-line in his attitude to the west in general and in his country's relationship with West Germany specifically. The decision suddenly to erect the Berlin Wall in August 1961 was naturally taken by the East Germans in full consultation with the Soviet ambassador. From the East German perspective The Wall represented a necessary desperate attempt to save the state which appeared to be in the process of losing its entire working age population. With Abrasimov as Soviet ambassador in Berlin, Walter Ulbricht, who had earlier enjoyed close relations with Soviet leader Josef Stalin, found he enjoyed far less direct contact with the Soviet leadership in Moscow. In 1963/64, when Ulbricht moved to control air traffic flying into West Berlin, it was Abrasimov who prevented the move. He actively opposed East German reluctance to conclude a belated post war peace treaty with West Germany, and in 1966 set up direct links with Willy Brandt, then the mayor of West Berlin, without telling the leadership of the East German ruling SED (party). Abrasimov also participated regularly in meetings of the East German cabinet, something which had never happened when Mikhail Pervukhin was the Soviet ambassador. The relationship between the Soviet ambassador and the East German leadership did not improve with the appointment of a new East German leader, Erich Honecker, in 1971. During the 1980s Abrasimov's growing propensity to meet regularly with western ambassadors to Berlin without reference to his East German host government did not help matters. In 1983 he was seen to be becoming ever more paternalistic and autocratic in his ambassadorial office, and following the death of Leonid Brezhnev at the end of 1982, Honecker managed to persuade Moscow to replace Abrasimov because of the extent of his "interference in East German domestic politics". During his time in East Germany, Abrasimov attended as a speaker at the commemoration ceremonies marking the liberation of the Sachsenhausen concentration camp at the National Memorial Site north of Berlin.

Back in Moscow he served as chair of the National Committee for Foreign Tourism between 1983 and 1985. Between 1985 and 1986 he served, briefly, as the Soviet ambassador to Japan.

== Awards and honours ==
(not necessarily a complete list)

- Order of Lenin (twice)
- Order of the Red Banner
- Order of the October Revolution
- Star of People's Friendship (East Germany)
- Order of the Red Banner of Labour
- Order of the Patriotic War
- Order of the Red Star (twice)
- Order of Karl Marx
- Order of the Cross of Grunwald (Polish People's Republic)
- Honorary citizenship of Berlin
- Honorary citizenship of Żyrardów
- Hero of the German Democratic Republic
- Medal "For the Defence of Moscow"
- Jubilee Medal "In Commemoration of the 100th Anniversary of the Birth of Vladimir Ilyich Lenin"
