= Ubri =

Ubri is a surname. Notable people with the surname include:

- Pavel Ubri (1820–1896), Russian diplomat
