= Treaty of Berlin (1878) =

Settlement by the Congress of Berlin following the Russo-Turkish War of 1877–78

Treaty between Austria-Hungary, France, Germany, Great Britain and Ireland, Italy, Russia, and the Ottoman Empire, for the Settlement of the Affairs of the East
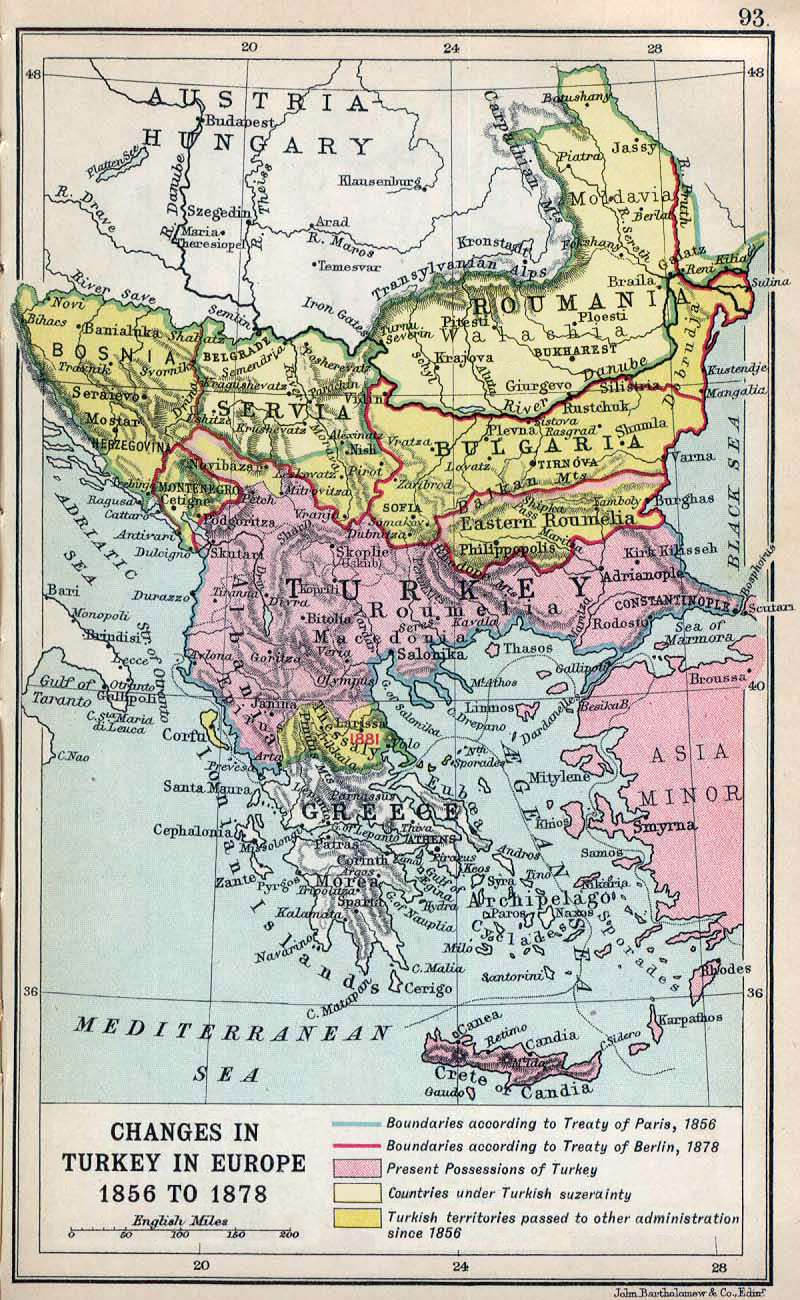
- Southeastern Europe after the Congress of Berlin
- Context: Congress of Berlin, after the Russo-Turkish War of 1877–1878
- Signed: 13 July 1878
- Location: Berlin, German Empire
- Parties: Ottoman Empire; United Kingdom; Austria-Hungary; French Republic; German Empire; Kingdom of Italy; Russian Empire

The Treaty of Berlin (formally the Treaty between Austria-Hungary, France, Germany, Great Britain and Ireland, Italy, Russia, and the Ottoman Empire for the Settlement of Affairs in the East) was signed on 13 July 1878. In the aftermath of the Russian victory against the Ottoman Empire in the Russo-Turkish War of 1877–1878, the major powers restructured the map of the Balkan region. They reversed some of the extreme gains claimed by Russia in the preliminary Treaty of San Stefano, but the Ottomans lost their major holdings in Europe. It was one of three major peace agreements in the period after the 1815 Congress of Vienna. It was the final act of the Congress of Berlin (13 June – 13 July 1878) and included the United Kingdom, Austria-Hungary, France, Germany, Italy, Russia and the Ottoman Empire. Chancellor of Germany Otto von Bismarck was the chairman and dominant personality.

The most important task of the Congress was to decide the fate of Bulgaria, but Bulgaria itself was excluded from participation in the talks, at Russian insistence. At the time, as it was not a sovereign state, Bulgaria was not a subject of international law, and the same went for the Bulgarians themselves. The exclusion was already an established fact in the great powers' Constantinople Conference, which had been held one year before without any Bulgarian participation.

The most notable result of the conference was the official recognition of the newly independent states of Romania, Serbia, and Montenegro (which had de facto been acting independently for decades). Furthermore, Russia regained access to the formerly demilitarised Black Sea region.

== Background ==
The Paris Peace Treaty of 1856, which ended the Crimean War, had made the Black Sea a neutral territory. The treaty had protected the Ottoman Empire, ended the Holy Alliance (Austria, Prussia and Russia) and weakened Russia's overall position. In 1870, Russia invoked the doctrine of rebus sic stantibus and effectively terminated the treaty by breaching provisions concerning the neutrality of the Black Sea. The great powers became increasingly convinced that the Ottoman Empire would not be able to hold its territories in Europe.

In 1875, the Herzegovina uprising resulted in the Great Eastern Crisis. As the conflict in the Balkans intensified, atrocities during the 1876 April Uprising in Bulgaria inflamed anti-Turkish sentiments in Russia and Britain, which eventually culminated in the Russo-Turkish War of 1877.

== Terms ==
The treaty formally recognized the independence of the de facto sovereign principalities of Romania, Serbia and Montenegro (plus their expansion) and the autonomy of Bulgaria although the latter de facto functioned independently and was divided into three parts: the Principality of Bulgaria, the autonomous province of Eastern Rumelia, and Macedonia, which was given back to the Ottomans, thus undoing Russian plans for an independent and Russophile "Greater Bulgaria". The Treaty of San Stefano had created a Bulgarian state, which was just what Britain and Austria-Hungary feared the most.

The Treaty of Berlin confirmed most of the Russian gains from the Ottoman Empire specified in the Treaty of San Stefano, such as Batumi and Adjara, but the valley of Alashkerd and the town of Bayazid were returned to the Ottomans. The regions of Ardahan and Kars were also ceded to Russia. The 1879 Treaty of Constantinople was a further continuation of negotiations. It reaffirmed the provisions of the Treaty of San Stefano which had not been modified by the Berlin Treaty and established amounts of compensation that the Ottoman Empire owed to Russia for losses to businesses and institutions during the war. It granted amnesty to Ottoman subjects and for release of prisoners of war. In addition, Article VII of the treaty provided that in the territory acquired by Russia, subjects could choose whether they wished to be Ottoman or Russian subjects for a period of six months after the agreement became effective.

Despite the pleas of the Romanian delegates, Romania was forced to cede southern Bessarabia to the Russian Empire. As a compensation, Romania received Dobruja, including the Danube Delta. The treaty also limited the Russian occupation of Bulgaria to 9 months, which limited the time during which Russian troops and supplies could be moved through Romanian territory.

The three newly independent states subsequently proclaimed themselves kingdoms: Romania in 1881, Serbia in 1882 and Montenegro in 1910. Bulgaria proclaimed full independence in 1908 after it had united with Eastern Rumelia in 1885.

The Treaty of Berlin accorded special legal status to some religious groups and also would serve as a model for the Minority Treaties, which would be established within the framework of the League of Nations. It stipulated that Romania recognize non-Christians (Jews and Muslims) as full citizens. It also vaguely called for a border rectification between Greece and the Ottoman Empire, which occurred after protracted negotiations in 1881, with the transfer of Thessaly to Greece.

In the "Salisbury Circular" of 1 April, the Marquess of Salisbury, appointed foreign secretary the next day, made clear his own and his government's objections to the Treaty of San Stefano and its favourable position of Russia. Historian A. J. P. Taylor wrote, "If the congress was a defeat for Russia, it was not a complete success for Austria-Hungary or even for Great Britain... The Macedonian question haunted European diplomacy for a generation and then caused the Balkan war of 1912. Bosnia first provoked the crisis of 1908 and then exploded the World war in 1914, a war which brought down the Habsburg monarchy. If the treaty of San Stefano had been maintained, both the Ottoman Empire and Austria-Hungary might have survived to the present day. The British, except for Beaconsfield in his wilder moments, had expected less and were, therefore, less disappointed. Salisbury wrote at the end of 1878: 'We shall set up a rickety sort of Turkish rule again in the south of the Balkans. But it is a mere respite. There is no vitality left in them.'"

The Kosovo Vilayet remained part of the Ottoman Empire. Austria-Hungary was allowed to station military garrisons in the Ottoman Vilayet of Bosnia and the Sanjak of Novi Pazar. The Vilayet of Bosnia was placed under Austro-Hungarian occupation although it formally remained part of the Ottoman Empire. Austria–Hungary annexed Bosnia in 1908, sparking the Bosnian crisis, a major European crisis that reinforced pre-World War I alliances. The Austro-Hungarian garrisons in the Sanjak of Novi Pazar were withdrawn in 1908, after the annexation of the Vilayet of Bosnia, to reach a compromise with the Ottoman Empire, which was struggling with internal strife because of the Young Turk Revolution (1908). The chaotic situation in the Ottoman Empire also allowed Bulgaria to formally declare its independence on 5 October 1908.

== List of plenipotentiaries ==
- Ottoman Empire
  - Alexander Karatheodori Pasha, Minister of Public Works
  - Mehmed Ali Pasha, marshal of the Ottoman army
  - Sadullah Pasha, ambassador to Berlin
- United Kingdom
  - Benjamin Disraeli, Earl of Beaconsfield, Prime Minister
  - Robert Gascoyne-Cecil, 3rd Marquess of Salisbury, Foreign Secretary
  - Lord Odo Russell, ambassador to Berlin
- Germany and Prussia
  - Otto von Bismarck, Minister President of Prussia and Chancellor of Germany
  - Baron Ernst von Bülow, Foreign Minister of Prussia
  - Chlodwig, Prince of Hohenlohe-Schillingsfürst, ambassador to Paris
- Austria-Hungary
  - Gyula, Count Andrássy, Foreign Minister
  - Count Alajos Károlyi, ambassador to Berlin
  - Baron Heinrich Karl von Haymerle, ambassador to Rome
- France
  - William Henry Waddington, the Comte de Saint-Vallier, ambassador to Berlin and Minister of Foreign Affairs
  - Félix Hippolyte Desprez, Director of Political Affairs in the Department for Foreign Affairs
- Russia
  - Alexander, Prince Gorchakov, Chancellor and Foreign Minister
  - Count Pyotr Shuvalov, ambassador to the court of St James's
  - Paul d'Oubril, ambassador to Berlin
- Italy
  - Edoardo de Launay, ambassador to Berlin
  - Luigi Corti

== See also ==
- Commissions of the Danube River
- List of treaties
- Armenian delegation at the Berlin Congress

== Sources ==
- Phillips, Walter Alison (1911). "Berlin § Berlin, Congress and Treaty of" . In Chisholm, Hugh (ed.). Encyclopædia Britannica. Vol. 3 (11th ed.). Cambridge University Press. pp. 790–791.
- Taylor, A. J. P. (1971) [1954]. The Struggle for Mastery in Europe 1848–1918. Oxford University Press. ISBN 0-19-881270-1.

== General references ==
- European commission for Eastern Roumelia (1880). Report presented to the international commission at Constantinople [European commission for Eastern Roumelia as to the state of Macedonia since the treaty of Berlin. Gilbert & Rivington.
- Gladstone, William Ewart (1878). The Berlin Treaty and the Anglo-Turkish Convention: speech of the Right Hon. W.E. Gladstone, M.P. in the House of Commons on Tuesday, July 30th, 1878.
- Gladstone, William Ewart (1916). "The Treaty of Berlin, 30 July 1878". Gladstone's Speeches, Descriptive Index and Bibliography by Arthur Tilney Bassett with a Preface by Viscount Bryce, O.M. and Introduction to the Selected Speeches by Herbert Paul. London: Methuen & Co. pp. 505–52.

'
