= Peter von Meyendorff =

Russian diplomat (1796–1863)

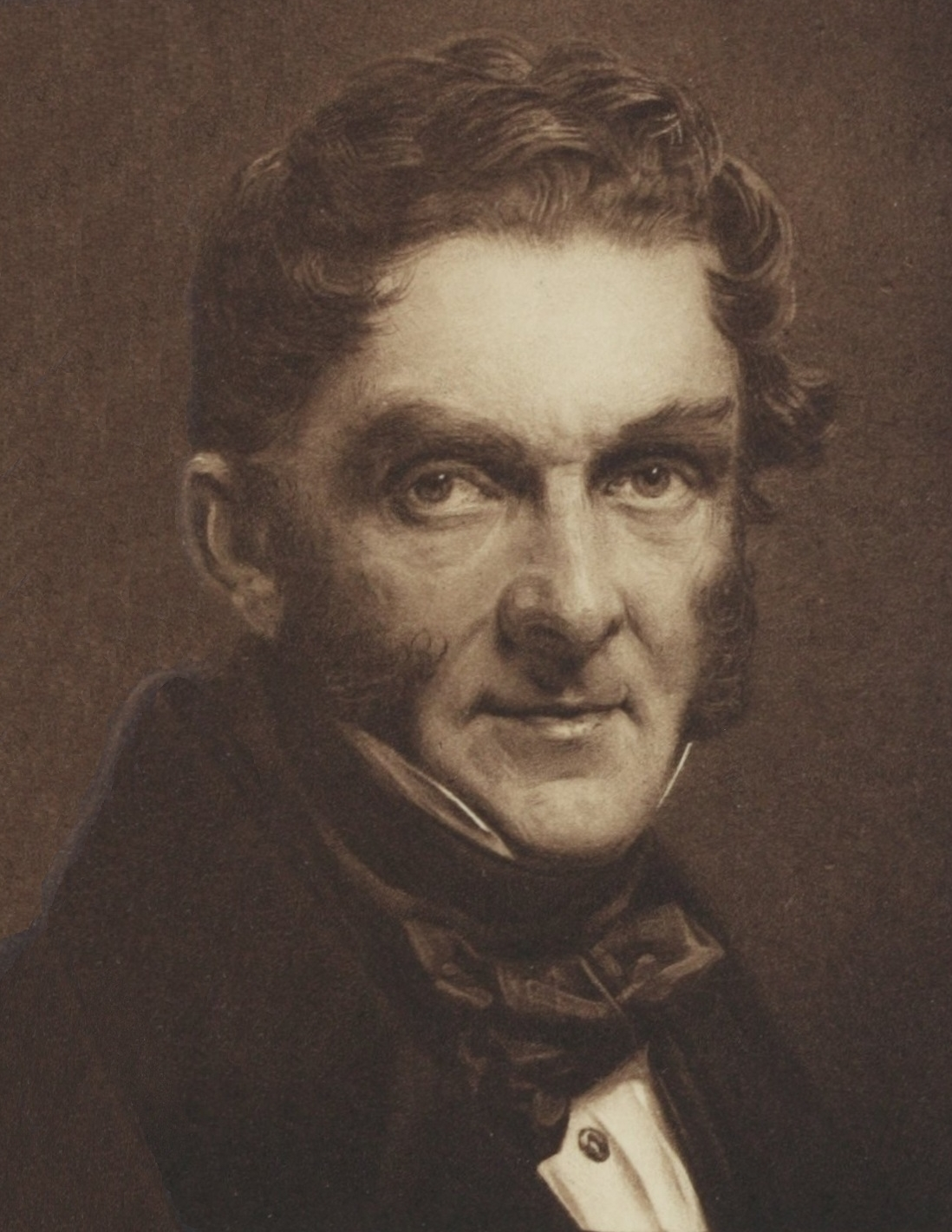
- Born: 2 August 1796; Riga, Russian Empire
- Died: 7 March 1863 (aged 66); Saint Petersburg, Russian Empire
- Noble family: Meyendorff
- Spouse: Sophia Rudolfovna von Buol-Shauenshteyn
- Father: Casimir von Meyendorff
- Mother: Anne-Catherine von Vegesack

Baron Peter von Meyendorff (Russian: Пётр Казими́рович Мейендо́рф, romanized: Pyotr Kazimirovich Meyendorf; 2 August 1796 – 7 March 1863) was a Russian diplomat from the Meyendorff family. From 1850 to 1854, he was the Russian ambassador to Austria.

Preceded by Pavel Ivanovich Medem	Russian ambassador to Austria; 1850–1854	Succeeded by Aleksandr Mikhailovich Gorchakov
