= Stanislav Osadchiy =

Russian diplomat

- Станислав Осадчий
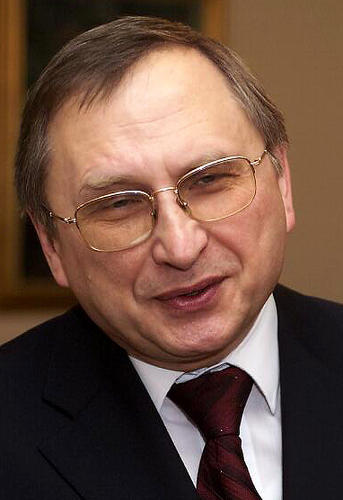
- Osadchiy in 2009

Russian Ambassador to Cyprus
- In office 3 June 2013 – 12 September 2022
- Preceded by: Vyacheslav Shumsky
- Succeeded by: Murat Zyazikov

Russian Ambassador to Austria
- In office 6 August 2004 – 9 March 2010
- Preceded by: Alexander Golovin
- Succeeded by: Sergey Nechayev

Personal details
- Born: 26 January 1951 (age 75) Moscow, Soviet Union
- Education: MGIMO

Stanislav Viliorovich Osadchiy (Russian: Станислав Вилиорович Осадчий; born 26 January 1951) is a diplomat who has served as Ambassador Extraordinary and Plenipotentiary of the Russian Federation to Austria, and to the Republic of Cyprus.

== Biography ==
Osadchiy graduated from the Moscow State Institute of International Relations in 1973 and went on to work in various diplomatic posts in the central offices of the Ministry of Foreign Affairs and abroad.

From 1997 to 1999, Osadchiy was the consul-general of Russia in Hamburg, Germany, and from 1999 to 2000 the consul-general of Russia in Istanbul, Turkey.

On 6 August 2004, he was appointed by Vladimir Putin as Ambassador of Russia to Austria, and he presented his credentials in Vienna on 14 September 2004.

Osadchiy speaks Russian, English, French, Greek, German and Turkish.
