= Valery Nikolayevich Popov =

Russian diplomat

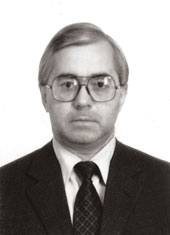

Valery Nikolayevich Popov (Russian: Валерий Николаевич Попов; born 6 July 1942) is a Russian diplomat and from 24 May 1990 to 25 December 1991 was the Ambassador of the Soviet Union to Austria, and from 25 December 1991 to 30 August 1996 was Ambassador of Russia to Austria.
