= List of ambassadors of Russia to Germany =

Ambassador of the Russian Federation to the Federal Republic of Germany
- Emblem of the Russian Foreign Ministry

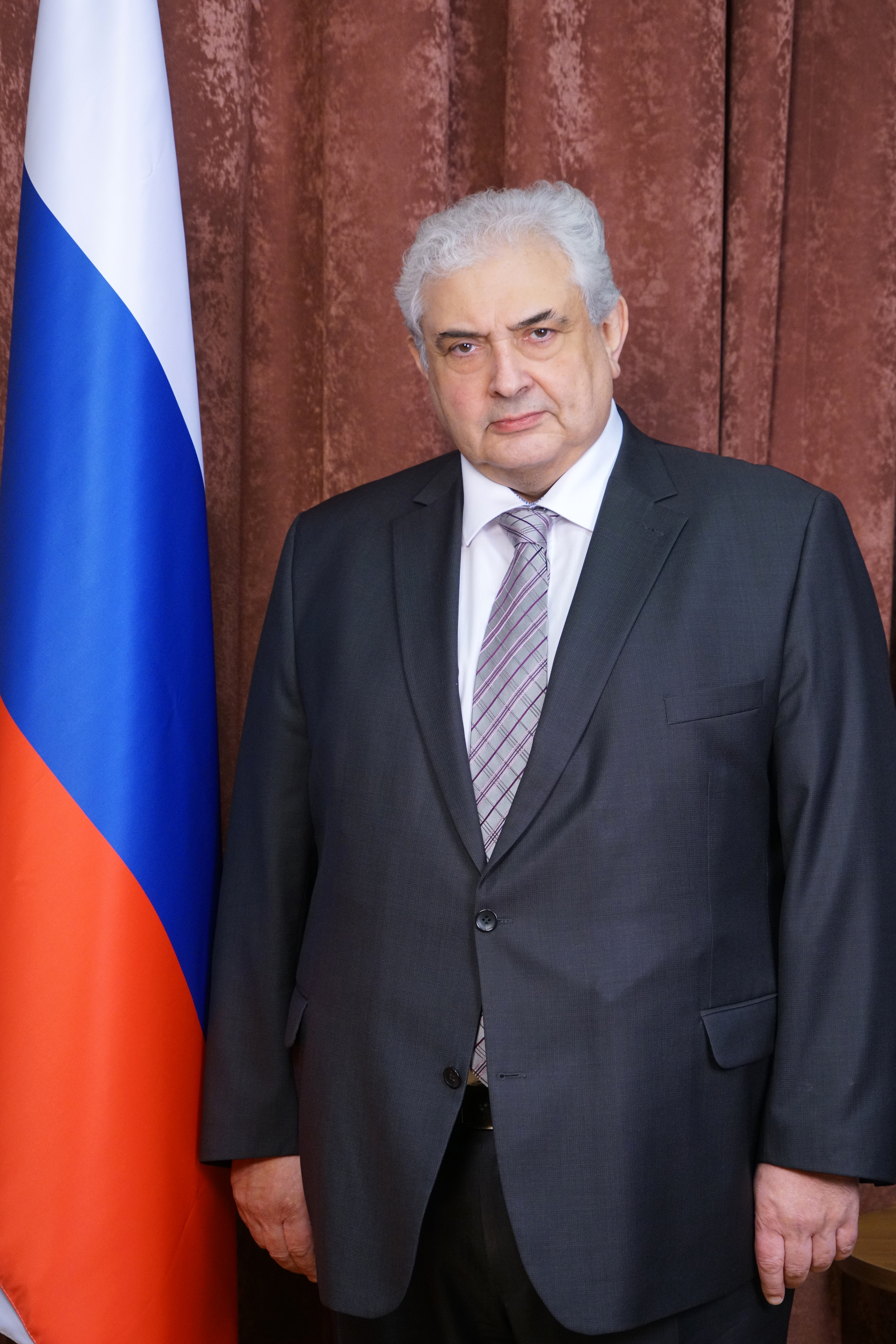
- Incumbent; Sergey Nechayev since 10 January 2018
- Ministry of Foreign Affairs; Embassy of Russia, Berlin
- Style: His Excellency; The Honourable
- Reports to: Minister of Foreign Affairs
- Seat: Berlin
- Appointer: President of Russia
- Term length: At the pleasure of the president
- Website: Embassy of Russia in Germany

The ambassador of Russia to Germany is the official representative of the president and the government of the Russian Federation to the president and the government of Germany.

The ambassador and his staff work at large in the embassy of Russia in Berlin. There is a consulate-general in Bonn. The current Russian ambassador to Germany is Sergey Nechayev, incumbent since 10 January 2018.

== History ==
Diplomatic relations between the forerunners of the modern states of Germany and Russia date back to the early eighteenth century. The Tsardom of Russia, and following its formation in 1721, the Russian Empire, opened up diplomatic relations with many of the historic Germanic states. With the formation of the German Empire in 1871, primarily under the auspicies of Prussia and under Kaiser Wilhelm I, the Russian envoy to Prussia, Pavel Ubri, was appointed the ambassador to the united German Empire. Representation to many of the constituent Germanic states that joined the German Empire continued, with representatives often having the title of envoy or resident minister. With the outbreak of the First World War, which pitted the Russian and German empires against each other, representation to these states, and to the German Empire as a whole, was broken off.

The February Revolution in 1917 overthrew the Imperial monarchy, bringing the Russian Provisional Government to power, which continued the war with Germany. The Provisional Government was itself overthrown by the Bolsheviks in the October Revolution that year, subsequently establishing the Russian Soviet Federative Socialist Republic. Negotiations were opened with Germany with a view to ending the war between the two countries, resulting in a commission led by Adolph Joffe which negotiated the Treaty of Brest-Litovsk and Russia's withdrawal from the war in 1918. Joffe was then appointed diplomatic representative to Germany, until 5 November 1918, shortly before the end of the First World War, when he and his embassy were expelled for their agitation and support for the German revolution that was beginning to sweep the country.

Relations between the Russian Soviet Federative Socialist Republic and what informally was the Weimar Republic, following the fall of the German Empire in 1918, were restored on 16 April 1922. Nikolay Krestinsky was appointed diplomatic representative on 20 June 1922, at first representing the Russian Soviet Federative Socialist Republic, and then from 23 July 1923, the newly-formed Soviet Union. Representation continued throughout the 1920s and 1930s, including during Adolf Hitler's rise to power and the establishment of the fascist government rule of Nazi Germany from 1933 onwards. Representation was briefly upgraded to ambassadorial exchanges on 9 May 1941, during the incumbency of Vladimir Dekanozov, but on 22 June 1941, Axis forces launched an invasion of the Soviet Union, and diplomatic relations were broken off.

With the end of the war in 1945, allied forces occupied Germany, with Soviet forces present in large parts of Eastern Germany, which fell under the Soviet occupation zone in Germany, agreed under the terms of the Potsdam Agreement. Relations deteriorated between the allied powers, and on 7 October 1949, the German Democratic Republic was declared in the region of the Soviet occupation zone. It was a communist state, heavily influenced and supported by the Soviet Union. The Soviet Union soon established official diplomatic relations with this new state, on 15 October 1949, with Georgy Pushkin appointed envoy on 16 October that year. Relations were upgraded to embassy level on 19 September 1953, and thereafter representatives had the title of ambassador. The Soviet Union was slower to establish relations with the state established in the other allied-occupied areas in 1949, the Federal Republic of Germany, but agreed to open relations on 13 September 1955, with the first ambassador Valerian Zorin, appointed on 27 November 1955. The Soviet Union continued to appoint representatives to both nations throughout most of the twentieth century.

By the late 1980s and early 1990s, reforms and reorientation of foreign policy in the Soviet Union had begun to lead to the disintegration of both the Warsaw Pact alliances and the Soviet Union itself. The push for German reunification began to gather pace in 1989, and eventually culminated in the dissolution of the German Democratic Republic and its constituent territory being unified with the Federal Republic of Germany. The incumbent ambassador to the Federal Republic of Germany, Vladislav Terekhov, was now the representative to a united Germany. The collapse of communist governments in Eastern Europe presaged the fall of the dominance of the Soviet communist party, and the eventual dissolution of the Soviet Union in 1991. Terekhov continued in post as ambassador of Russia to Germany until 1997.

At its height, the Russian Federation maintained its embassy in Berlin, as well as consulates-general in Bonn, Frankfurt, Hamburg, Leipzig, and Munich. Following the deterioration of relations in the aftermath of the Russian invasion of Ukraine in 2022, Russia reduced the number of German diplomats allowed in Russia. Germany responded with a similar enforced reduction in Russian personal operating in Germany, and ordering the closure of four of the five consulates. The Russian foreign ministry decided to retain the consulate-general in Bonn, while the remaining four were closed.

== List of representatives to Germany (1871-present) ==
=== Russian Empire to the German Empire (1871-1914) ===
Name	Title	Appointment	Termination	Notes
Pavel Ubri	Envoy until 7 December 1871; Ambassador after 7 December 1871	18 January 1871	22 December 1879	
Peter Saburov	Ambassador	22 December 1879	8 February 1884	
Nikolay Orlov	Ambassador	8 February 1884	17 March 1885	
Pavel Shuvalov	Ambassador	1 April 1885	13 December 1894	
Aleksey Lobanov-Rostovsky	Ambassador	6 January 1895	26 February 1895	
Nikolai Osten-Saken	Ambassador	10 March 1895	9 May 1912	
Sergey Sverbeyev	Ambassador	1912	1 August 1914	

=== Russian Soviet Federative Socialist Republic to Germany (1918-1923 (Note: The German Empire until 1918, and the Weimar Republic after 1918.)) ===
Name	Title	Appointment	Termination	Notes
Adolph Joffe	Diplomatic representative	March 1918	5 November 1918	Credentials presented on 20 April 1918
Nikolay Krestinsky	Diplomatic representative	20 June 1922	23 July 1923	Credentials presented on 8 July 1922

=== Soviet Union to Germany (1923—1941 (Note: The Weimar Republic until 1933, Nazi Germany after 1933.)) ===
Name	Title	Appointment	Termination	Notes
Nikolay Krestinsky	Diplomatic representative	23 July 1923	26 September 1930	
Lev Khinchuk	Diplomatic representative	26 September 1930	20 September 1934	Credentials presented on 9 December 1930
Jakob Suritz	Diplomatic representative	20 September 1934	7 April 1937	Credentials presented on 26 October 1934
Konstantin Yurenev	Diplomatic representative	16 June 1937	11 October 1937	Credentials presented on 21 July 1937
Georgy Astakhov	Chargé d'affaires	1937	1938	
Aleksey Merekalov	Diplomatic representative	6 May 1938	2 September 1939	Credentials presented on 13 July 1938
Aleksandr Shkvartsev	Diplomatic representative	2 September 1939	26 November 1940	Credentials presented on 3 September 1939
Vladimir Dekanozov	Diplomatic representative until 9 May 1941; Ambassador after 9 May 1941	26 November 1940	22 June 1941	Credentials presented on 19 December 1940
Operation Barbarossa and the Great Patriotic War - Diplomatic relations interrupted (1941-1949)

=== Soviet Union to the German Democratic Republic (1949-1990) ===
Name	Title	Appointment	Termination	Notes
Georgy Pushkin	Envoy	16 October 1949	26 May 1952	Credentials presented on 4 November 1949
Ivan Ilyichev	Envoy	1 June 1952	29 May 1953	Credentials presented on 5 June 1952
Vladimir Semyonov	Envoy until 19 September 1953; Ambassador after 19 September 1953	29 May 1953	17 July 1954	Credentials presented on 1 October 1953
Georgy Pushkin	Ambassador	17 July 1954	21 February 1958	Credentials presented on 28 July 1954
Mikhail Pervukhin	Ambassador	21 February 1958	15 December 1962	Credentials presented on 14 March 1958
Pyotr Abrasimov	Ambassador	15 December 1962	18 September 1971	Credentials presented on 17 December 1962
Mikhail Yefremov	Ambassador	30 October 1971	7 March 1975	Credentials presented on 30 October 1971
Pyotr Abrasimov	Ambassador	7 March 1975	12 June 1983	Credentials presented on 15 March 1975
Vyacheslav Kochemasov	Ambassador	12 June 1983	24 May 1990	Credentials presented on 11 August 1983
Gennady Shikin	Ambassador	24 May 1990	3 October 1990	

=== Soviet Union to the Federal Republic of Germany (1955-1991) ===
Name	Title	Appointment	Termination	Notes
Valerian Zorin	Ambassador	27 November 1955	14 October 1956	Credentials presented on 7 January 1956
Andrey Smirnov	Ambassador	14 October 1956	19 May 1966	Credentials presented on 3 November 1956
Semyon Tsarapkin	Ambassador	25 May 1966	23 February 1971	Credentials presented on 12 July 1966
Valentin Falin	Ambassador	23 February 1971	10 November 1978	Credentials presented on 12 May 1971
Vladimir Semyonov	Ambassador	10 November 1978	15 April 1986	Credentials presented on 21 November 1978
Yuly Kvitsinsky	Ambassador	15 April 1986	24 April 1990	
Vladislav Terekhov	Ambassador	24 April 1990	25 December 1991	

=== Russian Federation to Germany (1991-present) ===
Name	Title	Appointment	Termination	Notes
Vladislav Terekhov	Ambassador	25 December 1991	3 September 1997	
Sergey Krylov	Ambassador	3 September 1997	25 February 2004	
Vladimir Kotenyov	Ambassador	5 April 2004	21 June 2010	
Vladimir Grinin	Ambassador	21 June 2010	10 January 2018	
Sergey Nechayev	Ambassador	10 January 2018		

== Previous German states ==
Name	Establishment	Termination	Notes
To the Imperial Diet	1757	1799	
To the German Confederation	1744	1866	
To Baden	1803	1914	
To Bavaria	1785	1914	
To Hannover	1709	1866	
To Hesse	1839	1914	
To the Lower Saxon Circle	1709	1914	
To Oldenburg	1829	1914	
To Prussia	1701	1871	
To Saxe-Altenburg	1847	1914	
To Saxe-Weimar	1815	1914	
To the Kingdom of Saxony	1744	1914	
To Württemberg	1800	1914	
