= Sergey Nechayev (diplomat) =

Russian diplomat (born 1953)

- Сергей Нечаев
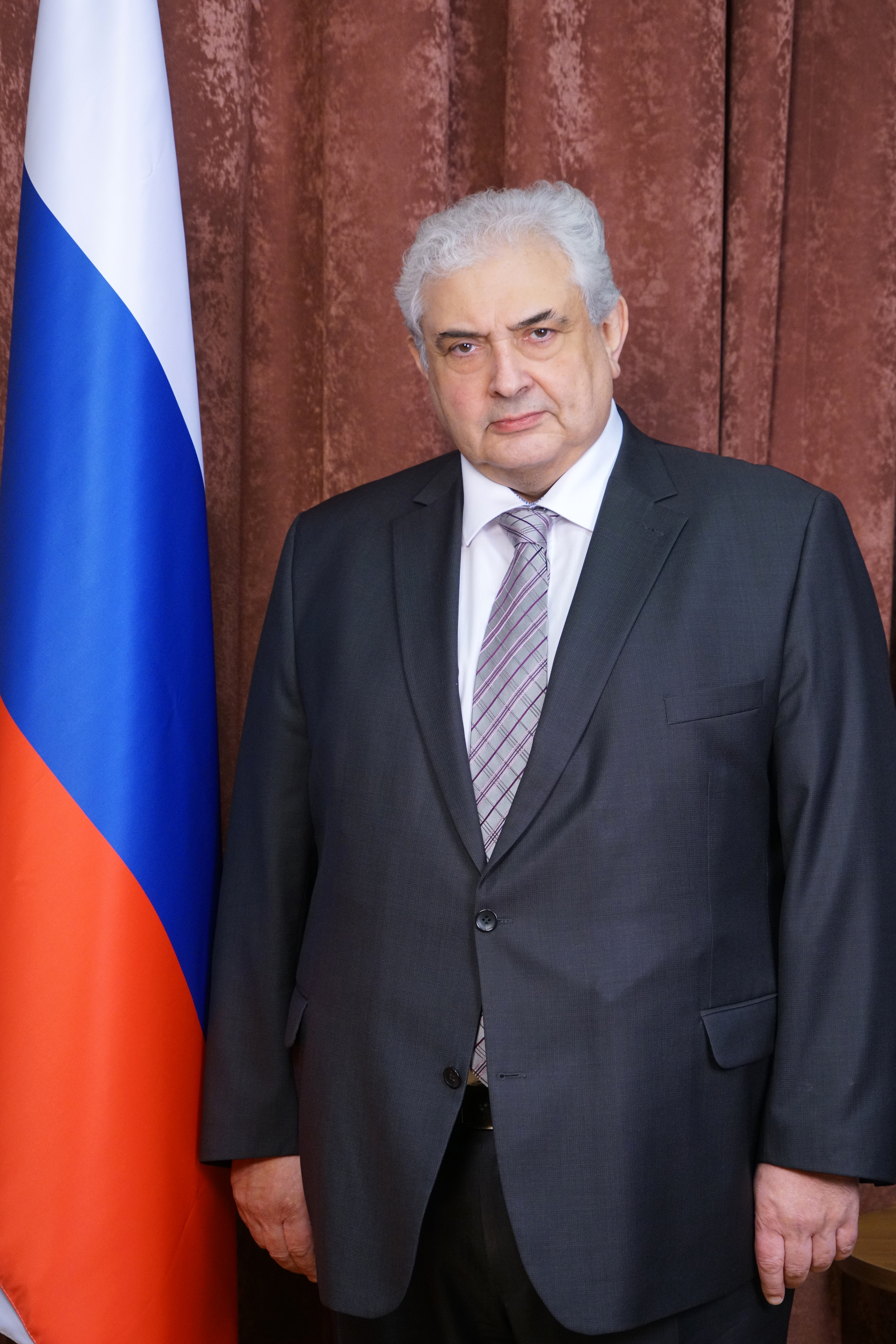

Russian Ambassador to Germany
- Incumbent
- Assumed office 10 January 2018
- Preceded by: Dmitry Lyubinsky

Russian Ambassador to Austria
- In office 9 March 2010 – 10 August 2015
- Preceded by: Stanislav Osadchiy
- Succeeded by: Dmitry Lyubinsky

Personal details
- Born: 2 June 1953 (age 73) Moscow, Soviet Union
- Education: Moscow State University; MFA Diplomatic Academy
- Awards: Order of Alexander Nevsky; Order of Honour; Order of Friendship

Sergey Yuryevich Nechayev (Russian: Сергей Юрьевич Нечаев; born June 2, 1953, Moscow, RSFSR, USSR) is a Soviet and Russian diplomat. He has served as Ambassador Extraordinary and Plenipotentiary of the Russian Federation to Germany since 2018.

== Biography ==
He graduated from Moscow State University, specializing in Germanic studies (1975), and from the Diplomatic Academy of the Ministry of Foreign Affairs of the USSR (1988).

From 1977 to 1980, he served as a staff member at the Embassy of the USSR in the German Democratic Republic. From 1982 to 1986, he served as a third and then second secretary at the Consulate General of the USSR in Erdenet in the Mongolian People's Republic. From 1986 to 1988, he was a student at the Diplomatic Academy of the Ministry of Foreign Affairs of the USSR. From 1992 to 1996, he served as a first secretary and subsequently as a counselor at the Embassy of Russia in the Federal Republic of Germany. From 1996 to 1999, he headed the Germany Division of the Fourth European Department of the Ministry of Foreign Affairs of Russia. From 1999 to 2001, he served as a senior counselor at the Embassy of Russia in the FRG. From 2001 to 2003, he served as the Consul General of Russia in Bonn. From 2003 to 2004, he was the deputy director of the Fourth European Department of the Ministry of Foreign Affairs of Russia. From 2004 to 2007, he was the deputy director of the Third European Department of the Ministry of Foreign Affairs of Russia. From September 1, 2007, to 2010, he served as the Director of the Third European Department of the Ministry of Foreign Affairs of Russia. From March 9, 2010, to August 10, 2015, he served as the Ambassador Extraordinary and Plenipotentiary of the Russian Federation to Austria. He presented his letters of credence on April 29, 2010. From August 24, 2015, to 2018, he served as Director of the Third European Department at the Russian Foreign Ministry.

Since January 10, 2018, he has served as Ambassador Extraordinary and Plenipotentiary of the Russian Federation to Germany. He is proficient in German and English.
