= Alexander Vasiliyevich Golovin =

Russian diplomat (1949–2023)

Alexander Golovin
- Александр Головин
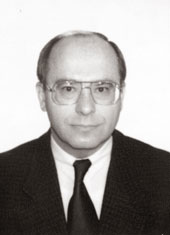

Russian Ambassador to Switzerland
- In office 21 February 2012 – 9 December 2016
- Preceded by: Igor Bratchikov
- Succeeded by: Sergei Garmonin

Russian Ambassador to Lichtenstein
- In office 21 February 2012 – 9 December 2016
- Preceded by: Igor Bratchikov
- Succeeded by: Sergei Garmonin

Russian Ambassador to Austria
- In office 4 August 2000 – 6 August 2004
- Preceded by: Vladimir Grinin
- Succeeded by: Stanislav Osadchiy

Personal details
- Born: 5 December 1949 Moscow, Soviet Union
- Died: 27 October 2023 (aged 73) Moscow, Russia
- Resting place: Troyekurovskoye Cemetery
- Education: MGIMO

Alexander Vasiliyevich Golovin (Russian: Александр Васильевич Головин; 5 December 1949 – 27 October 2023) was a Russian diplomat with the rank of Plenipotentiary Ambassador.

== Biography ==
Golovin graduated from the Moscow State Institute of International Relations in 1971, and went on to work in various posts with the Ministry of Foreign Affairs of the USSR. From 1993 to 1996, he was Senior Adviser to the Embassy of Russia in Berlin, and from 1996 to 2000 was director of the Fourth European Department at the Russian Ministry of Foreign Affairs.

His first ambassadorial appointment came in 2000, when he was appointed by Vladimir Putin at Ambassador of Russia to Austria from 4 August 2000, and held this post until 6 August 2004.

Golovin was Ambassador of Russia to Switzerland from 27 March 2012.

Golovin spoke Russian, English, German and French. He died on 27 October 2023, at the age of 73.
