= Balbina =

Balbina may refer to:

== People ==
- Saint Balbina
- Balbina Gutierrez (born 1929), French actress
- Balbina Herrera (born 1954 or 1955), Panamanian politician
- Balbina Steffenone (1825–1896), 19th-century soprano

== Places ==
- Balbina District in the municipality of Presidente Figueiredo in the Brazilian state of Amazonas
- Balbina Dam in Brazil

== See also ==
- Balbín, surname
