= Gennady Shikin =

Soviet and Russian diplomat (1938–2006)

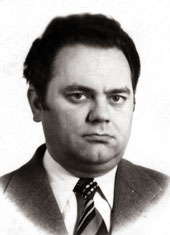
Gennady Sergeyevich Shikin

Gennady Serafimovich Shikin (Russian: Геннадий Серафимович Шикин; 30 August 1938 – 25 August 2006) was a Soviet and Russian diplomat.

== Career ==
From 24 October 1986 to 24 May 1990, Shikin was Ambassador of the Soviet Union to Austria, and from 24 May 1990 to 3 October 1990, he was the last Ambassador Extraordinary and Plenipotentiary of the USSR to the German Democratic Republic.
From 25 December 1991 to 29 January 1996 he was Ambassador of Russia to Yugoslavia.
