= Semyon Tsarapkin =

Soviet diplomat

Semyon Konstantinovich Tsarapkin (Russian: Семён Константинович Царапкин; 5 May 1906 – 17 September 1984) was a Soviet diplomat. He was involved in negotiations over the 1963 Partial Nuclear Test Ban Treaty, worked in the United Nations and held various other diplomatic posts.

== Biography ==
Tsarapkin was born in 1906 in Mykolaiv. He came from a working-class family, finding employment in a plant that smelted while a teenager. He studied history in University.

Tsarapkin entered the Soviet Union's diplomatic service in 1937. Four years later he worked in negotiations over the Soviet–Japanese Neutrality Pact. Tsarapkin later led the diplomatic service's department of the United States. In 1941, he participated in negotiations that resulted in a nonaggression pact with Japan, and also attended the Potsdam Conference, the 1944 Dumbarton Oaks Conference and the 1945 United Nations Conference on International Organization in San Francisco where the Charter of the United Nations was signed. He led the Soviet Embassy in Washington for two years beginning in 1947 before becoming the deputy representative of the Soviet Union to the United Nations Security Council. Tsarapkin held that post for five years. In 1954 he became head of the division of international conferences.

In the 1950 and 1960s he was involved in several negotiations over nuclear weapons including the drafting of the 1963 Partial Nuclear Test Ban Treaty. Work towards that ban began in 1958 in Geneva, and Tsarapkin served as chief Soviet negotiator for the duration. From 1966 to 1971 Tsarapkin served as Ambassador of the Soviet Union to West Germany. For the remainder of his life he worked as an ambassador-at-large.

When Tsarapkin died in 1984, an obituary in The Philadelphia Inquirer described him as having "won a reputation as the Soviet's best-liked diplomat".
