= Viktor Balabin =

Russian diplomat

Viktor Petrovich Balabin
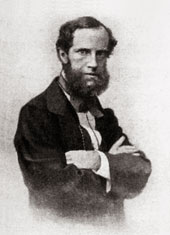

10th Russia Ambassador to Austria
- In office 1860–1864
- Preceded by: Aleksandr Mikhailovich Gorchakov
- Succeeded by: Ernest Gustavovich Stackelberg

Personal details
- Born: 1811
- Died: 4 November 1864 (aged 52–53)

Viktor Petrovich Balabin (Russian: Виктор Петрович Балабин, born 1811, died 4 November 1864) was a Russian diplomat and ambassador.

== Career ==
From 1860 to 1864, he served as the Russian ambassador to the Austrian Empire.

Political offices
Preceded by Aleksandr Mikhailovich Gorchakov	Russian Ambassador to Austria; 1860 – 1864	Succeeded by Ernest Gustavovich Stackelberg
