= Balbín =

Balbín is a surname. Notable people with the surname include:

- Adán Balbín (born 1986), Peruvian footballer
- Ángel Díaz Balbín (1955–1986), Peruvian triple murderer and suspected serial killer
- Bohuslav Balbín (1621–1688), Czech writer, historian, geographer, and Jesuit
- Carla Toscano de Balbín (born 1977), Spanish politician
- Ricardo Balbín (1904–1981), Argentine lawyer and politician
