= Georgy Pushkin =

Soviet diplomat and politician

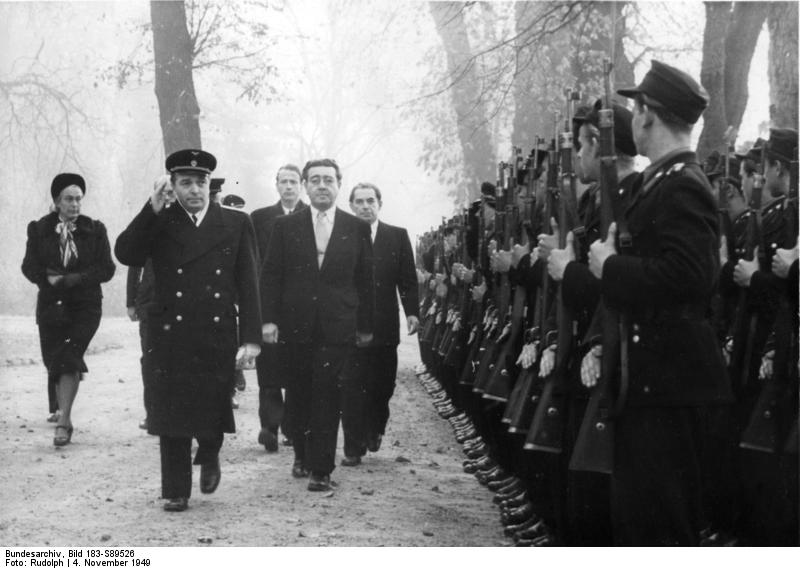
- Pushkin in East Berlin, 1949
- Born: Georgy Maksimovich Pushkin; 3 February 1909; Malaya Konoplyanka village, Smolensk Governorate, Russian Empire
- Died: 2 April 1963 (aged 54); Moscow, Russian SFSR, Soviet Union
- Occupation: Diplomat

Georgy Maksimovich Pushkin (Russian: Георгий Максимович Пушкин; 3 February 1909 – 2 April 1963) was an ambassador of the Soviet Union and politician.

He served as ambassador to Hungary beginning in March 1948.

From June to October 1949 he served as Head of the Department of the USSR Ministry of Foreign Affairs, at the same time Chairman of the Radio Broadcasting Committee of the USSR Council of Ministers.

He was ambassador to East Germany.

In 1961, he held the office of Deputy Foreign Minister and was the Soviet delegate to the International Agreement on the Neutrality of Laos.
