= Valerian Zorin =

Soviet diplomat (1902–1986)

- Валериан Зорин
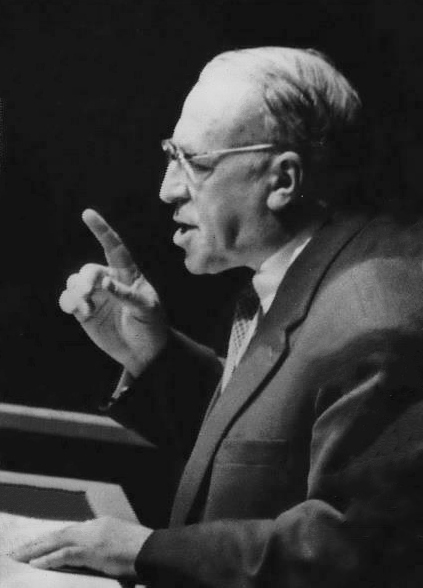
- Zorin in 1961
- Born: 14 January 1902; Novocherkassk, Russian Empire
- Died: 14 January 1986 (aged 84); Moscow, Russian SFSR, Soviet Union
- Occupation: Diplomat
- Political party: Communist Party of the Soviet Union (1922–1986)
- Awards: Three Orders of Lenin

Valerian Aleksandrovich Zorin (Russian: Валериан Александрович Зорин; 14 January 1902 – 14 January 1986) was a Soviet diplomat best remembered for his famous confrontation with Adlai Stevenson on 25 October 1962, during the Cuban Missile Crisis.

== Life and career ==
Zorin was born in Novocherkassk. After joining the Communist Party of the Soviet Union in 1922, Zorin held a managerial position in a Moscow city committee and the Central Committee of the Komsomol until 1932. In 1935, he graduated from the Communist Institute of Education (Высший коммунистический институт просвещения). From 1935 to 1941, Zorin worked on numerous Party assignments and as a teacher. From 1941 to 1944, he was employed at the People's Commissariat for Foreign Affairs. From 1945 to 1947, Zorin was the Soviet ambassador to Czechoslovakia. In 1948, he helped to organise the Czechoslovak coup d'état. From 1947 to 1955 and again from 1956 to 1965, he was Deputy Minister of Foreign Affairs of the Soviet Union. At the same time, he held other positions, including that of the permanent Soviet representative at the UN Security Council from 1952 to 1953. From 1955 to 1956, Zorin was the first Soviet ambassador to the Federal Republic of Germany. From 1956 to 1965, he again represented the Soviet Union at the UN Security Council, which led to his famous confrontation with Adlai Stevenson on 25 October 1962, during the Cuban Missile Crisis.

Following the assassination of John F. Kennedy in 1963, Zorin released a controversial statement on the potential causes of the president's murder that dismissed beliefs that Kennedy had been killed by a leftist fanatic, Lee Harvey Oswald, and instead speculated that it might have been a result of Kennedy's progressive views concerning civil rights and the "scum" of the American South.

From 1965 to 1971, Zorin served as the Soviet ambassador to France. In 1971, he became an ambassador on special missions at the Ministry of Foreign Affairs of the Soviet Union. At the 22nd and 23rd Congress of the CPSU in 1961 and 1966, Zorin was elected to the Central Committee of the CPSU.

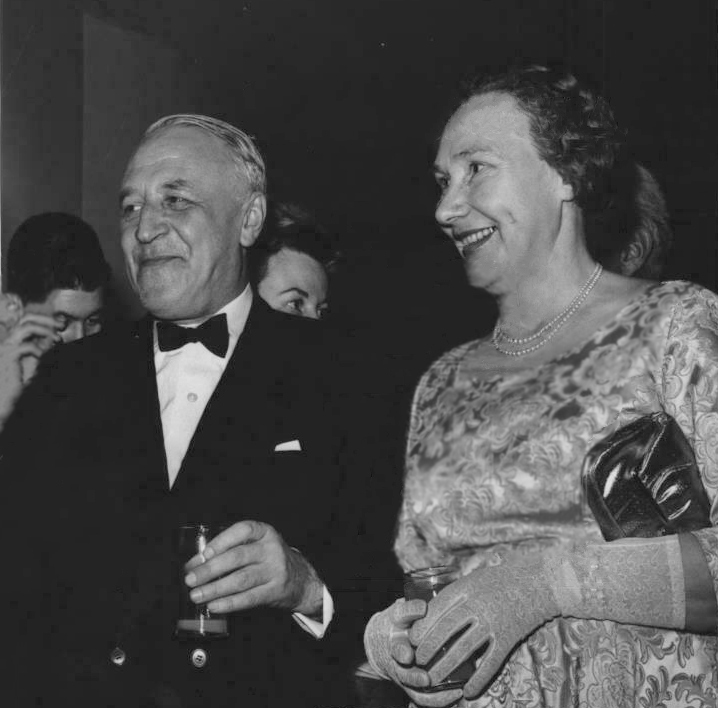
Zorin with wife in 1962

== In popular culture ==
- In the 1974 television play The Missiles of October, Zorin is portrayed by Will Kuluva.
- In the 2000 film Thirteen Days, he is portrayed by Oleg Vidov.
- In the 2013 Czech television series Czech Century (České století), he is portrayed by the opera singer Vladimír Koval.
