= Pavel Ubri =

Russian diplomat (1820–1896)

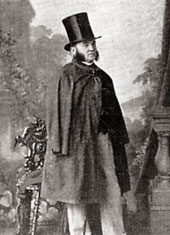
Pavel Ubri

Graf Pavel Petrovich Ubri (Russian: Па́вел Петро́вич Убри́; 1820–1896) was a diplomat for the Russian Empire.

As First Adviser of the Embassy of Russia in Vienna, Ubri was the right-hand of Prince Alexander Gorchakov in the lead up of the Crimean War during the Vienna Conference of 1853. He transferred to Paris in 1856 as First Adviser of the Russian embassy in Paris, and during this time he became friends with Otto von Bismarck, and nurtured friendly links between the royal courts in Berlin and Saint Petersburg when in 1863 he was appointed as Russian Ambassador Extraordinary and Minister Plenipotentiary in Berlin, and was also accredited concurrently to the North German Confederation in 1868, and later to the German Empire on 30 December 1871.

In 1880, he was appointed as Russian ambassador in Vienna. A devout Catholic, he carried out negotiations with Luigi Jacobini to reconcile differences between the Russian Empire and the Vatican, but in 1882 he was recalled from Vienna and was appointed as a member of the State Council.

He died in 1896.
