= Pavel Medem =

Russian diplomat

Count Pavel Ivanovich Medem (Russian: Па́вел Ива́нович Ме́дем; 9 January 1800, in Mitava, Courland Governorate – 10 January 1854, in Courland) was a Russian diplomat and privy councillor.

Medem held the post of Counsellor of the Embassy in Paris before becoming charge d'affaires in London from 1834 to 1835, envoy in Stuttgart and Darmstadt from 1840 to 1841, and envoy to Austria from 1848 to 1850.
