= Ivan Ilyichev =

Soviet military official and diplomat

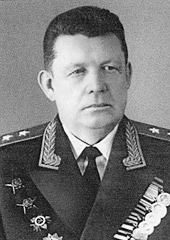
Ivan Ilyichev

Ivan Ivanovich Ilyichev (Russian: Иван Иванович Ильичёв; 14 August 1905 – 2 September 1983) was a Soviet military official and diplomat.

Born in Navoloki, Kaluga Governorate in 1905, Ilyichev joined the Russian Communist Party (bolsheviks) in 1925 and went on to serve in the Red Army. He studied at the Lenin Military-Political Academy until May 1938, and after graduation he became the head of the Political Directorate of the Red Army Intelligence, as a Brigade Commissar. During the German-Soviet War from August 1942 until July 1945 he was the Head of the GRU.

After the War, he joined the Soviet Ministry of Foreign Affairs, and from 1949—1952 he was the deputy political adviser to the Soviet Control Commission in Germany. He served in the diplomatic mission of the Soviet Union to East Germany as its head for several months over the period 1952—1953.

After his posting to East Berlin was completed, he was posted to Vienna, first as political adviser to the Soviet Control Commission in Austria, and until 13 June as Soviet Supreme Commissar. From 13 June 1953 to 31 March 1956 Ilyichev was Ambassador of the Soviet Union to Austria, with the diplomatic rank of Ambassador Extraordinary and Plenipotentiary.

After the completion of his mission to Vienna, he returned to Moscow where he became the Head of the European Department of the Ministry of Foreign Affairs, before being posted to Copenhagen on 26 January 1966 as Ambassador of the Soviet Union to Denmark. His mission in the Danish capital finished on 12 November 1968, whereby he returned to Moscow and a position in the central apparatus of the Ministry of Foreign Affairs until his retirement in 1975. He died in Moscow in 1983.
