= Chairman of the Council of Ministers of the Soviet Union =

Government leader of the Soviet Union

- Председатель Совета Министров Советского Союза
- Coat of Arms of the Soviet Union

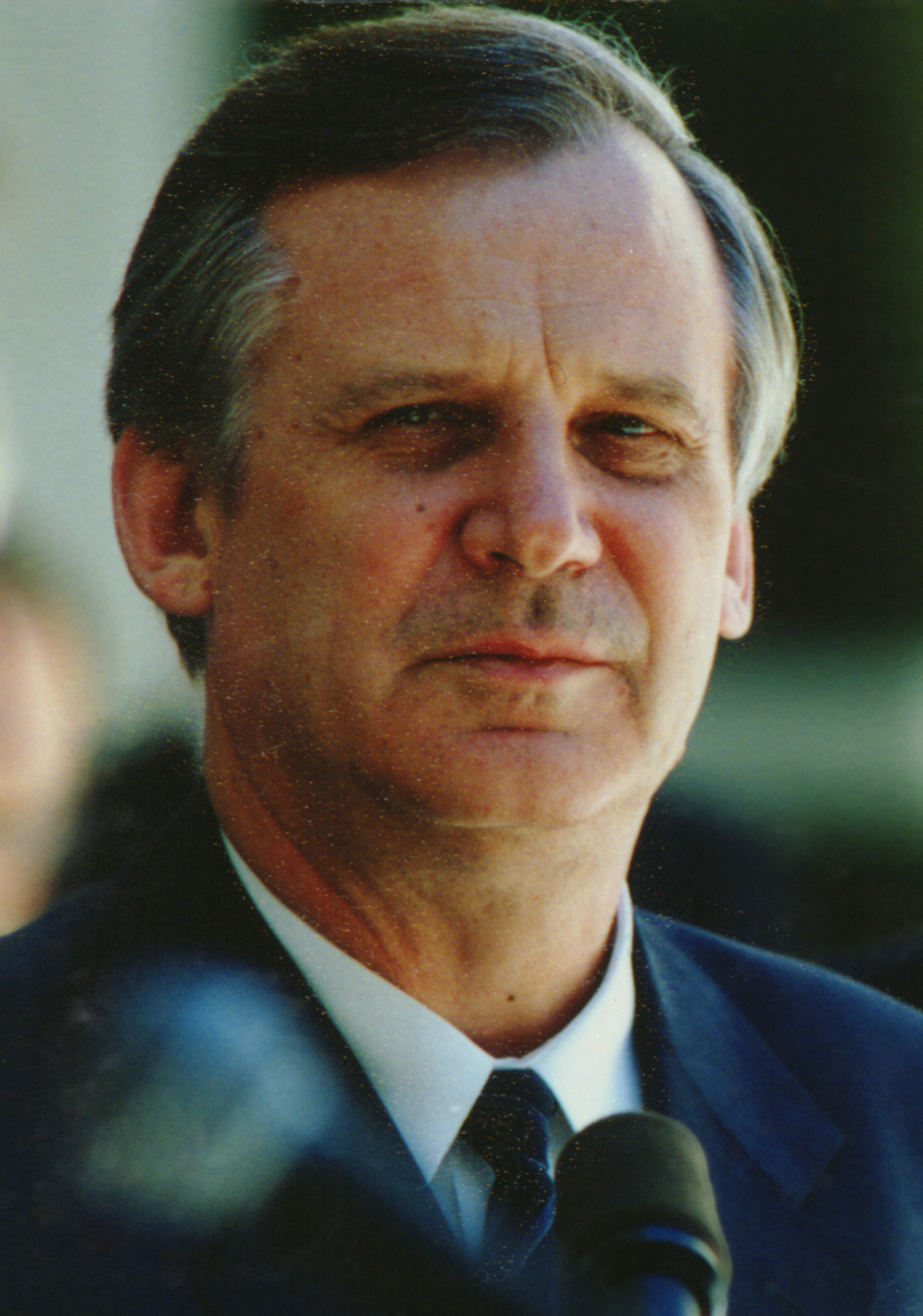
- Nikolay Ryzhkov, last in office
- Residence: Moscow Kremlin
- Appointer: Supreme Soviet of the Soviet Union
- Precursor: Chairman of the Council of People's Commissars of the Soviet Union
- Formation: March 15, 1946
- First holder: Joseph Stalin
- Final holder: Nikolay Ryzhkov
- Abolished: January 14, 1991
- Succession: Prime Minister of the Soviet Union

The Chairman of the Council of Ministers of the Soviet Union was the head of the government of the Soviet Union during the existence of the Council of Ministers of the Soviet Union from 1946 to 1991.

== Powers ==
The appointment of the Chairman of the Council of Ministers of the Soviet Union was carried out by the Supreme Soviet of the Soviet Union. The powers of the Chairman of the Council of Ministers of the Soviet Union included the following:

- Management of the activities of the government of the Soviet Union;
- Selection of candidates for government members for approval by the Supreme Soviet of the Soviet Union;
- Submission of proposals to the Supreme Soviet of the Soviet Union on the appointment and dismissal of members of the government (with the approval of the Supreme Soviet of the Soviet Union or the Presidium of the Supreme Soviet of the Soviet Union);
- Organization of the work of the Council of Ministers and its Presidium and management of their meetings;
- Coordination of the activities of their deputies;
- Ensuring collegiality in the work of the Government;
- Representation of the Soviet Union in international relations;
- Taking decisions in urgent cases on certain issues of public administration.

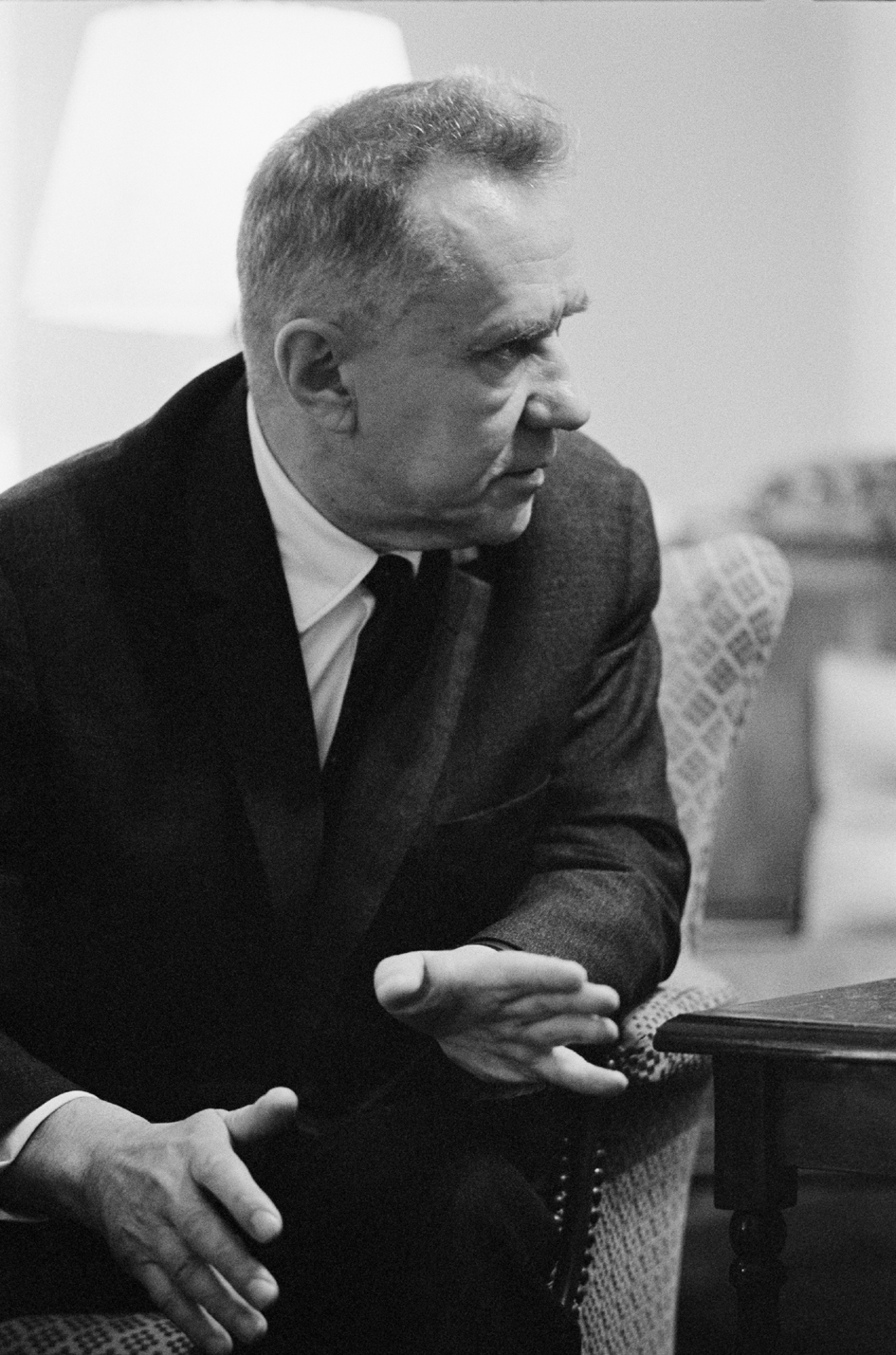
Alexei Kosygin was a member of the government of the Soviet Union for over 40 years (from 1939 to 1980), 16 of which served as Chairman of the Council of Ministers

On October 14, 1964, the Plenum of the Central Committee of the Communist Party of the Soviet Union, which relieved Nikita Khrushchev of his duties as First Secretary of the Central Committee of the Communist Party of the Soviet Union and Chairman of the Council of Ministers of the Soviet Union, recognized it inappropriate to further combine the highest party post and the post of head of government.

Despite its broad powers, the personal power of the Chairman of the Council of Ministers of the Soviet Union was significantly limited. For example, the Chairman of the Council of Ministers did not have the right to independently appoint and dismiss members of the government of the Soviet Union – including ministers and chairmen of state committees – and other members of the government; this right belonged to the Supreme Soviet of the Soviet Union (and in the period between its sessions – the Presidium of the Supreme Soviet). The appointment of deputy ministers of the Soviet Union, deputy chairmen of state committees of the Soviet Union and members of collegiums of ministries and state committees, as well as issues of the country's economic policy and its implementation by central government bodies, were the subject of collegial consideration by members of the government. The same applied to decisions on the creation, reorganization, abolition, personnel and activities of subordinate bodies of the Council of Ministers of the Soviet Union, including bodies created to systematically check the implementation of government decisions. These decisions were not taken by the head of government alone, but by a majority vote of the members of the Council of Ministers or its Presidium. The limited influence that the head of the Soviet government could personally exert on the activities of members of the government and government agencies is illustrated by the words of Alexei Kosygin, Chairman of the Council of Ministers of the Soviet Union, one of the initiators of the 1965 economic reform, said in an interview with the head of the government of Czechoslovakia, Lubomir Strougal in 1971:

Nothing left. Everything collapsed. All work was stopped, and the reforms fell into the hands of people who do not want them at all... The reform is torpedoed. The people with whom I worked out the materials of the congress have already been removed, and completely different people have been called. And I don't expect anything.

—

== List (with deputies) ==
Here are lists of chairmen of the Council of Ministers of the Soviet Union, first deputies and deputy chairmen of the Council of Ministers of the Soviet Union. The list of the chairmen of the Council of Ministers of the Soviet Union is given in chronological order. Alphabetical lists of first deputies and deputies are given for each chairman. The dates of the person in office are indicated in parentheses.

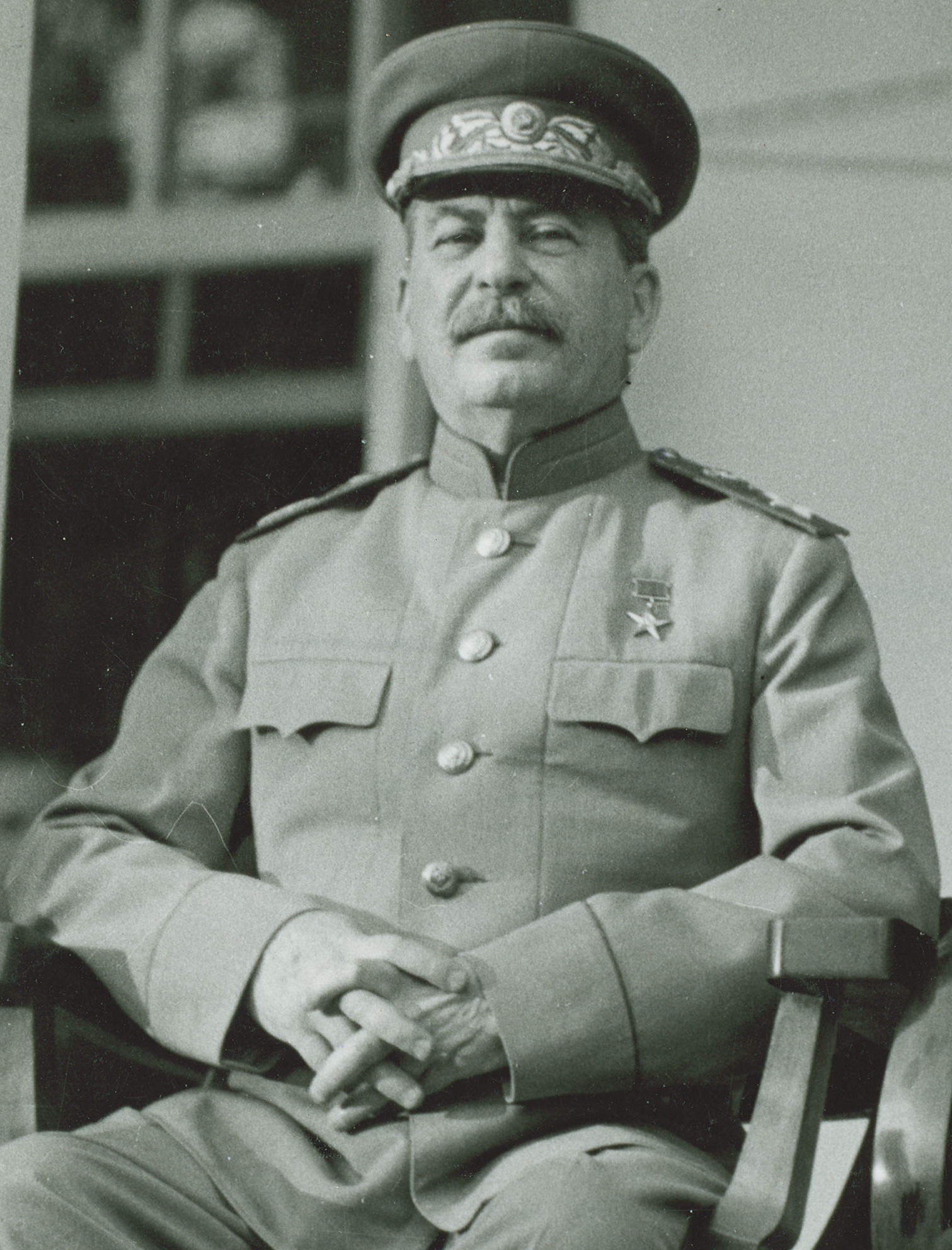
Stalin's Government (1946–1953)
No.	Chairman	First Deputy chairman
1	Joseph Stalin (March 19, 1946 – March 5, 1953)	Nikolay Bulganin (April 7, 1950 – February 8, 1955); Vyacheslav Molotov (March 19, 1946 – June 29, 1957)
1	Joseph Stalin (March 19, 1946 – March 5, 1953)	Deputy Chairmen
1	Joseph Stalin (March 19, 1946 – March 5, 1953)	Andrey Andreev (March 19, 1946 – March 2, 1953); Lavrenty Beria (March 19, 1946 – March 5, 1953); Nikolay Bulganin (March 5, 1947 – April 7, 1950); Nikolay Voznesensky (March 19, 1946 – March 7, 1949); Clement Voroshilov (March 19, 1946 – March 15, 1953); Alexander Efremov (March 8, 1949 – November 23, 1951); Lazar Kaganovich (March 19, 1946 – March 6, 1947, December 18, 1947 – March 5, 1953); Alexey Kosygin (March 19, 1946 – March 15, 1953); Alexey Krutikov (July 13, 1948 – February 8, 1949); Georgy Malenkov (August 2, 1946 – March 5, 1953); Vyacheslav Malyshev (December 19, 1947 – March 15, 1953); Anastas Mikoyan (March 19, 1946 – March 15, 1953); Panteleimon Ponomarenko (December 12, 1952 – March 15, 1953); Maxim Saburov (February 8, 1947 – March 5, 1953); Ivan Tevosyan (June 13, 1949 – March 15, 1953)

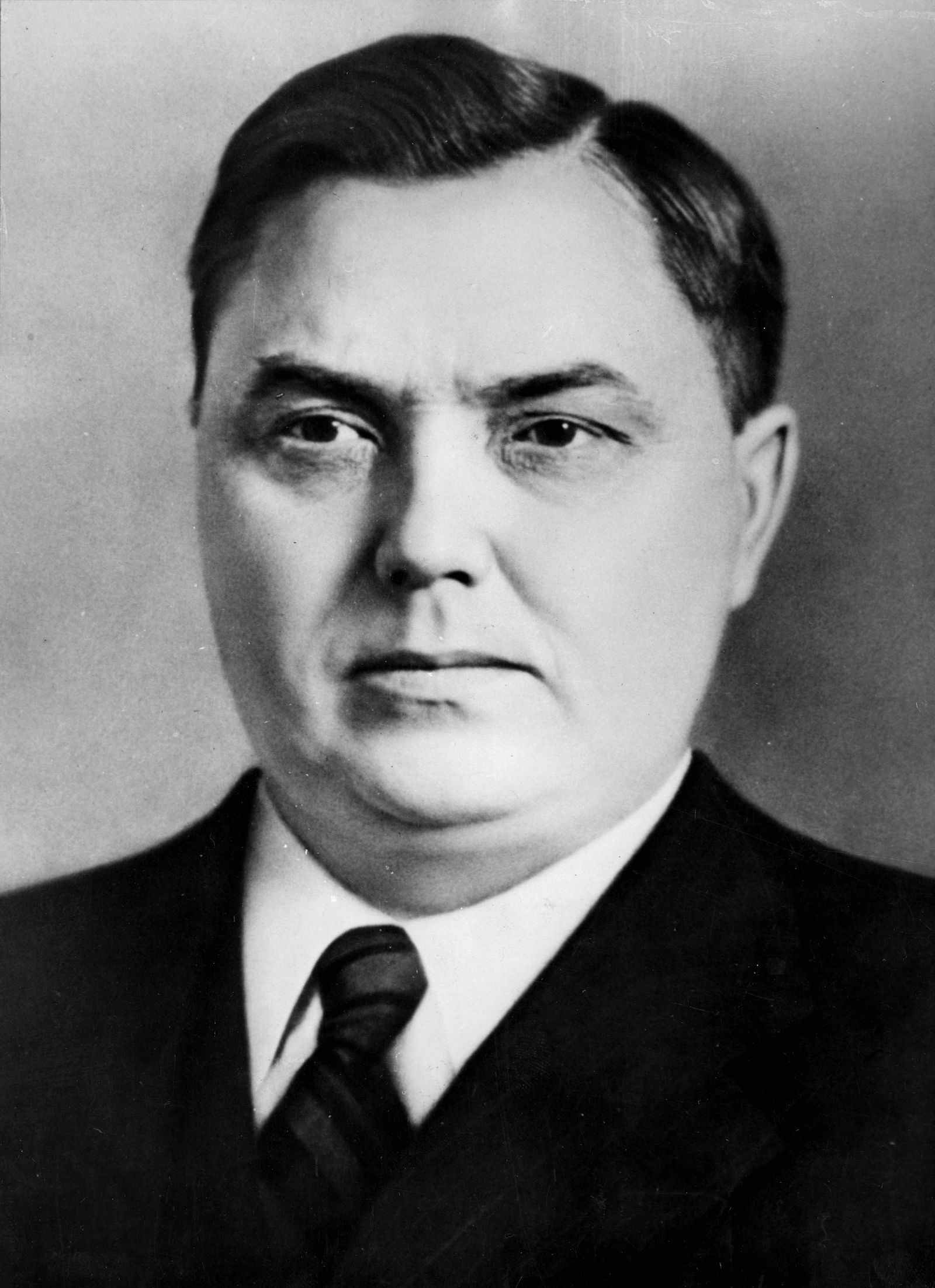
Malenkov's Government (1953–1955)
No.	Chairman	First Deputy Chairmen
2	Georgy Malenkov (March 5, 1953 – February 8, 1955)	Lavrenty Beria (March 5, 1953 – June 26, 1953); Nikolay Bulganin (April 7, 1950 – February 8, 1955); Lazar Kaganovich (March 5, 1953 – June 29, 1957); Vyacheslav Molotov (March 19, 1946 – June 29, 1957)
2	Georgy Malenkov (March 5, 1953 – February 8, 1955)	Deputy Chairmen
2	Georgy Malenkov (March 5, 1953 – February 8, 1955)	Andrey Andreev (March 19, 1946 – March 15, 1953); Clement Voroshilov (March 19, 1946 – March 15, 1953); Alexey Kosygin (March 19, 1946 – March 15, 1953, December 7, 1953 – December 25, 1956); Vyacheslav Malyshev (December 19, 1947 – March 15, 1953, December 7, 1953 – December 25, 1956); Anastas Mikoyan (March 19, 1946 – February 28, 1955); Mikhail Pervukhin (January 17, 1950 – March 15, 1953, December 7, 1953 – February 28, 1955); Panteleimon Ponomarenko (December 12, 1952 – March 15, 1953); Maxim Saburov (December 7, 1953 – February 28, 1955); Ivan Tevosyan (June 13, 1949 – March 15, 1953, December 7, 1953 – December 28, 1956)

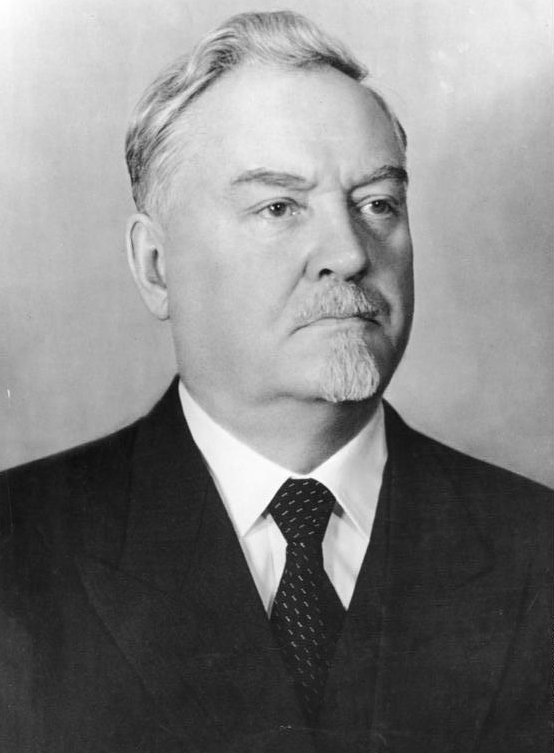
Bulganin's Government (1955–1958)
No.	Chairman	First Deputy Chairmen
3	Nikolai Bulganin (February 8, 1955 – March 27, 1958)	Lazar Kaganovich (March 5, 1953 – June 29, 1957); Joseph Kuzmin (May 3, 1957 – March 31, 1958); Anastas Mikoyan (February 28, 1955 – July 15, 1964); Vyacheslav Molotov (March 19, 1946 – June 29, 1957); Mikhail Pervukhin (February 28, 1955 – July 5, 1957); Maxim Saburov (February 28, 1955 – July 5, 1957)
3	Nikolai Bulganin (February 8, 1955 – March 27, 1958)	Deputy Chairmen
3	Nikolai Bulganin (February 8, 1955 – March 27, 1958)	Avraamy Zavenyagin (February 28, 1955 – December 31, 1956); Alexey Kosygin (December 7, 1953 – December 25, 1956, July 5, 1957 – May 4, 1960); Vladimir Kucherenko (February 28, 1955 – December 25, 1956); Pavel Lobanov (February 28, 1955 – April 9, 1956); Vyacheslav Malyshev (December 7, 1953 – December 25, 1956); Vladimir Matskevich (April 9, 1956 – December 25, 1956); Anastas Mikoyan (April 27, 1954 – February 28, 1955); Mikhail Pervukhin (December 7, 1953 – February 28, 1955); Ivan Tevosyan (December 7, 1953 – December 28, 1956); Dmitry Ustinov (December 14, 1957 – March 13, 1963); Mikhail Khrunichev (February 28, 1955 – December 25, 1956)

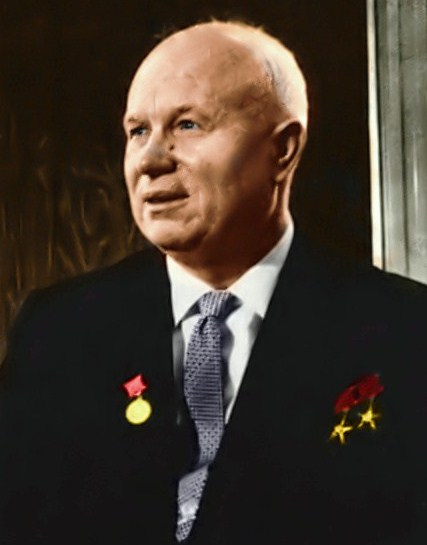
Khrushchev's Government (1958–1964)
No.	Chairman	First Deputy Chairmen
4	Nikita Khrushchev (March 27, 1958 – October 15, 1964)	Frol Kozlov (March 31, 1958 – May 4, 1960); Alexey Kosygin (May 4, 1960 – October 15, 1964); Joseph Kuzmin (May 3, 1957 – March 31, 1958); Anastas Mikoyan (February 28, 1955 – July 15, 1964); Dmitry Ustinov (March 13, 1963 – March 26, 1965)
4	Nikita Khrushchev (March 27, 1958 – October 15, 1964)	Deputy Chairmen
4	Nikita Khrushchev (March 27, 1958 – October 15, 1964)	Veniamin Dymshits (July 17, 1962 – December 20, 1985); Alexander Zasyadko (March 31, 1958 – November 9, 1962); Nikolay Ignatov (May 4, 1960 – December 26, 1962); Alexey Kosygin (July 5, 1957 – May 4, 1960); Joseph Kuzmin (March 31, 1958 – March 20, 1959); Mikhail Lesechko (November 24, 1962 – October 24, 1980); Peter Lomako (November 10, 1962 – October 2, 1965); Vladimir Novikov (May 4, 1960 – November 24, 1962); Ignatiy Novikov (May 4, 1960 – July 20, 1983); Dmitry Polyansky (November 23, 1962 – October 2, 1965); Konstantin Rudnev (June 10, 1961 – October 2, 1965); Leonid Smirnov (March 13, 1963 – November 15, 1985); Dmitry Ustinov (December 14, 1957 – March 13, 1963); Alexander Shelepin (November 23, 1962 – December 9, 1965)

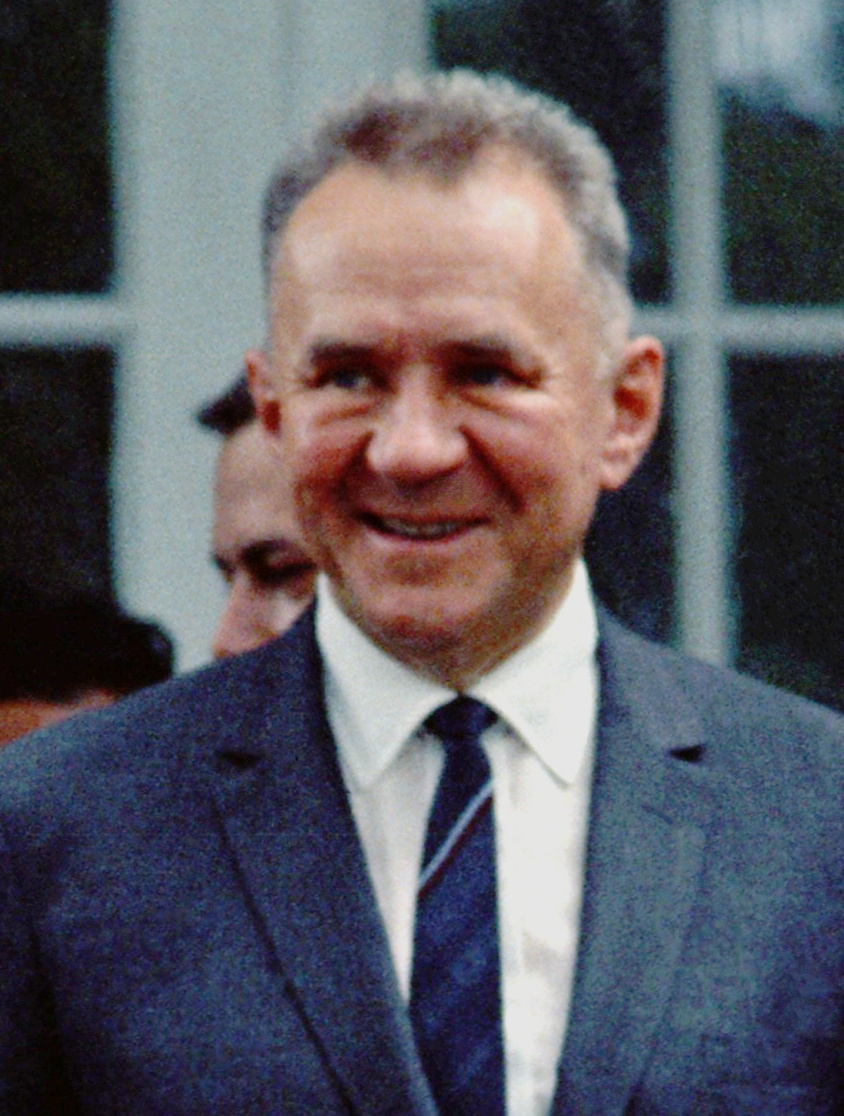
Kosygin's Government (1964–1980)
No.	Chairman	First Deputy Chairmen
5	Alexei Kosygin (October 15, 1964 – October 23, 1980)	Kirill Mazurov (March 26, 1965 – November 28, 1978); Dmitry Polyansky (October 2, 1965 – February 2, 1973); Nikolay Tikhonov (September 2, 1976 – October 23, 1980); Dmitry Ustinov (March 13, 1963 – March 26, 1965)
5	Alexei Kosygin (October 15, 1964 – October 23, 1980)	Deputy Chairmen
5	Alexei Kosygin (October 15, 1964 – October 23, 1980)	Ivan Arkhipov (March 21, 1974 – October 27, 1980); Nikolay Baibakov (October 2, 1965 – October 14, 1985); Veniamin Dymshits (July 17, 1962 – December 20, 1985); Mikhail Efremov (November 13, 1965 – October 29, 1971); Konstantin Katushev (March 16, 1977 – July 29, 1982); Vladimir Kirillin (October 2, 1965 – January 22, 1980); Tikhon Kiselev (December 5, 1978 – October 23, 1980); Mikhail Lesechko (November 24, 1962 – October 24, 1980); Peter Lomako (November 10, 1962 – October 2, 1965); Nikolay Martynov (June 25, 1976 – November 15, 1985); Guriy Marchuk (January 28, 1980 – October 28, 1986); Vladimir Novikov (March 26, 1965 – December 19, 1980); Ignatiy Novikov (November 24, 1962 – July 20, 1983); Ziya Nuriev (April 3, 1973 – November 1, 1985); Dmitry Polyansky (November 23, 1962 – October 2, 1965); Konstantin Rudnev (June 10, 1961 – October 2, 1965); Leonid Smirnov (March 13, 1963 – November 15, 1985); Nikolay Tikhonov (October 2, 1965 – September 2, 1976); Alexander Shelepin (November 23, 1962 – December 9, 1965); Peter Shelest (May 19, 1972 – May 7, 1973)

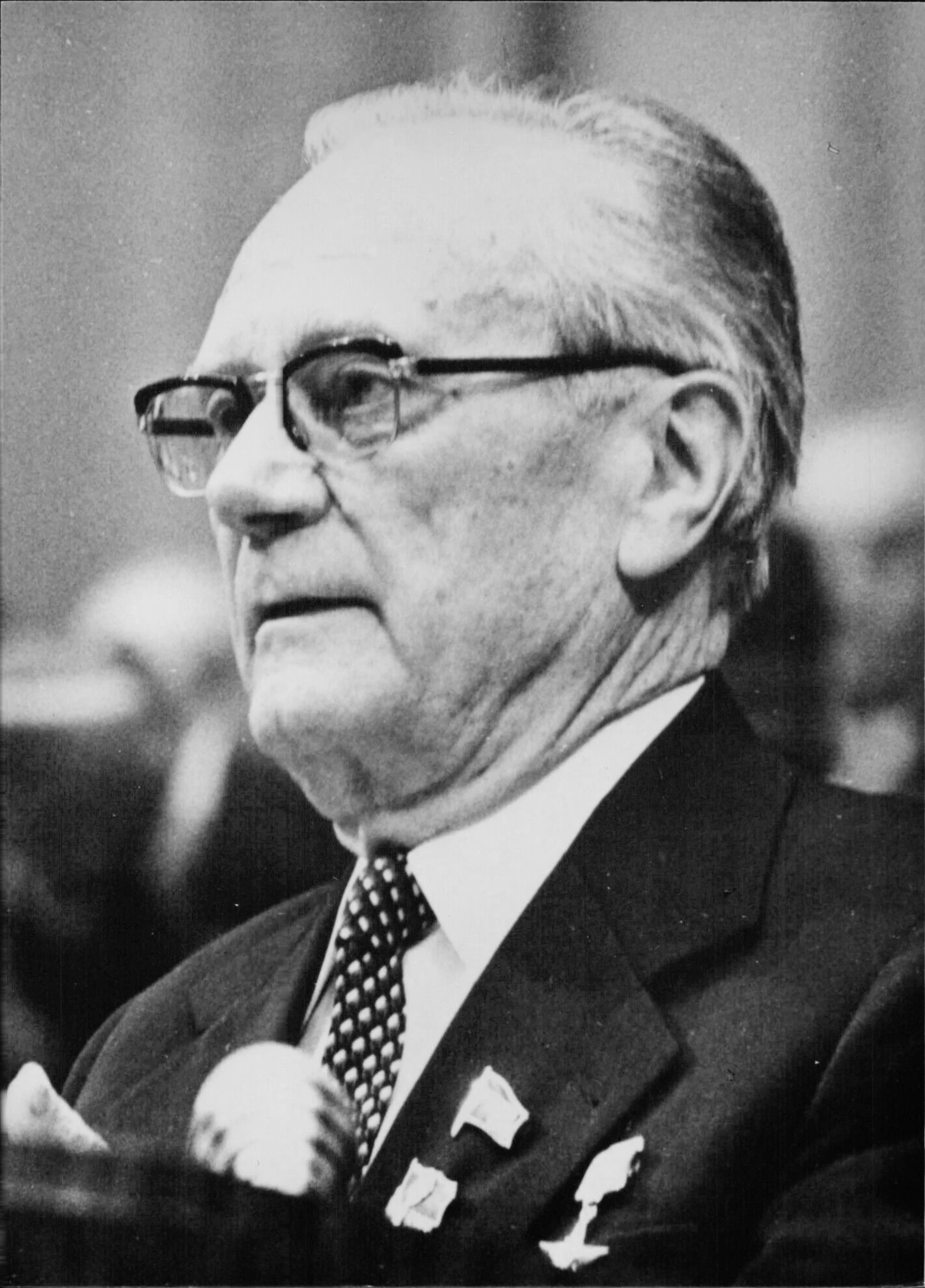
Tikhonov's Government (1980–1985)
No.	Chairman	First Deputy Chairmen
6	Nikolai Tikhonov (October 23, 1980 – September 27, 1985)	Heydar Aliyev (November 24, 1982 – October 23, 1987); Ivan Arkhipov (October 27, 1980 – October 4, 1986); Andrey Gromyko (March 24, 1983 – July 2, 1985)
6	Nikolai Tikhonov (October 23, 1980 – September 27, 1985)	Deputy Chairmen
6	Nikolai Tikhonov (October 23, 1980 – September 27, 1985)	Alexey Antonov (December 19, 1980 – October 1, 1988); Ivan Arkhipov (March 21, 1974 – October 27, 1980); Nikolay Baibakov (October 2, 1965 – October 14, 1985); Ivan Bodul (December 19, 1980 – May 30, 1985); Veniamin Dymshits (July 17, 1962 – December 20, 1985); Leonid Kostandov (November 4, 1980 – September 5, 1984); Valentin Makeev (October 23, 1980 – January 20, 1983); Nikolay Martynov (June 25, 1976 – November 15, 1985); Guriy Marchuk (January 28, 1980 – October 28, 1986); Vladimir Novikov (March 26, 1965 – December 19, 1980); Ignatiy Novikov (November 24, 1962 – July 20, 1983); Ziya Nuriev (April 3, 1973 – November 1, 1985); Konstantin Katushev (March 16, 1977 – July 29, 1982); Yakov Ryabov (September 27, 1984 – June 19, 1986); Leonid Smirnov (March 13, 1963 – November 15, 1985); Nikolay Talyzin (October 24, 1980 – October 14, 1985); Boris Shcherbina (January 13, 1984 – June 7, 1989)

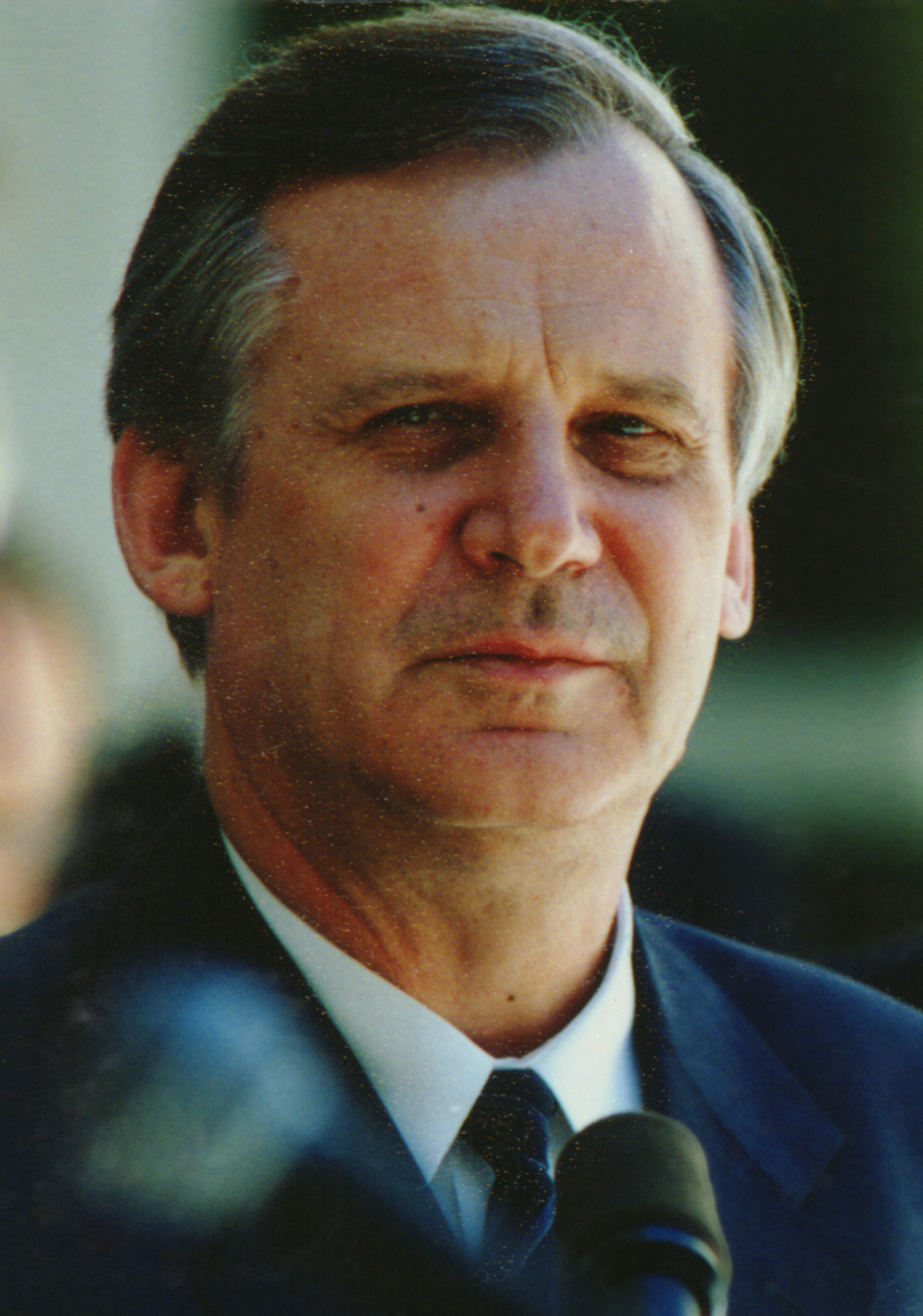
Ryzhkov's Government (1985–1990)
No.	Chairman	First Deputy Chairmen
7	Nikolai Ryzhkov (September 27, 1985 – January 14, 1991)	Heydar Aliyev (November 24, 1982 – October 23, 1987); Ivan Arkhipov (October 27, 1980 – October 4, 1986); Lev Voronin (November 15, 1985 – June 7, 1989, July 17, 1989 – January 14, 1991); Vitaly Doguzhiev (July 17, 1989 – January 14, 1991); Yuri Maslyukov (February 5, 1988 – January 14, 1991); Vsevolod Murakhovsky (November 1, 1985 – June 7, 1989); Vladilen Nikitin (July 27, 1989 – August 30, 1990); Nikolay Talyzin (October 14, 1985 – October 1, 1988)
7	Nikolai Ryzhkov (September 27, 1985 – January 14, 1991)	Deputy Chairmen
7	Nikolai Ryzhkov (September 27, 1985 – January 14, 1991)	Leonid Abalkin (July 17, 1989 – January 14, 1991); Alexey Antonov (December 19, 1980 – October 1, 1988); Nikolay Baibakov (October 2, 1965 – October 14, 1985); Yuri Batalin (December 20, 1985 – June 7, 1989); Igor Belousov (February 12, 1988 – January 14, 1991); Alexandra Biryukova (October 1, 1988 – September 17, 1990); Gennady Vedernikov (June 19, 1986 – June 7, 1989); Vladimir Gusev (June 19, 1986 – December 26, 1990); Veniamin Dymshits (July 17, 1962 – December 20, 1985); Vladimir Kamentsev (September 1, 1986 – June 7, 1989); Nikolay Laverov (July 17, 1989 – December 26, 1990); Nikolay Martynov (June 25, 1976 – November 15, 1985); Guriy Marchuk (January 28, 1980 – October 28, 1986); Yuri Maslyukov (November 15, 1985 – February 5, 1988); Pavel Mostovoy (July 17, 1989 – January 14, 1991); Ziya Nuriev (April 3, 1973 – November 1, 1985); Lev Ryabev (July 17, 1989 – December 26, 1990); Yakov Ryabov (September 27, 1984 – June 19, 1986); Ivan Silaev (November 1, 1985 – July 2, 1990); Stepan Sitaryan (October 24, 1989 – December 26, 1990); Leonid Smirnov (March 13, 1963 – November 15, 1985); Nikolay Talyzin (October 1, 1988 – June 7, 1989); Boris Tolstykh (February 6, 1987 – June 7, 1989); Boris Shcherbina (January 13, 1984 – June 7, 1989)

== See also ==
- Council of Ministers of the Soviet Union
- Head of the Government of the Soviet Union
- Chairman of the Council of People's Commissars of the Soviet Union
- Prime Minister of the Soviet Union
