= Deputy Premier of the Soviet Union =

Government position in the USSR

This is a list of all deputy premiers of the Soviet Union.

== List ==
=== Deputy chairman of the Council of People's Commissars ===
- Lev Kamenev (July 6, 1923 – January 16, 1926)
- Alexei Rykov (July 6, 1923 – February 2, 1924)
- Alexander Tsiurupa (July 6, 1923 – May 8, 1928)
- Vlas Chubar (July 6, 1923 – May 21, 1925, April 24, 1934 – July 4, 1938)
- Mamia Orakhelashvili (July 6, 1923 – May 21, 1925)
- Valerian Kuybyshev (January 16, 1926 – November 5, 1926, 10 November 1930 – May 14, 1934)
- Jānis Rudzutaks (January 16, 1926 – May 25, 1937)
- Grigoriy Ordzhonikidze (November 5, 1926 – November 10, 1930)
- Vasily Schmidt (August 11, 1928 – December 1, 1930)
- Andrey Andreyev (December 22, 1930 – October 9, 1931)
- Valery Mezhlauk (April 25, 1934 – February 25, 1937, October 17, 1937 – December 1, 1937)
- Nikolay Antipov (April 27, 1935 – June 21, 1937)
- Anastas Mikoyan (July 22, 1937 – March 15, 1946)
- Stanislav Kosior (January 19, 1938 – May 3, 1938)
- Lazar Kaganovich (August 21, 1938 – May 15, 1944, December 20, 1944 – March 15, 1946)
- Nikolai Voznesensky (April 4, 1939 – March 10, 1941)
- Nikolai Bulganin (September 16, 1938 – May 15, 1944)
- Andrey Vyshinsky (May 31, 1939 – May 15, 1944)
- Rosalia Zemlyachka (8 May 1939 – August 26, 1943)
- Alexei Kosygin (April 17, 1940 – March 15, 1946)
- Mikhail Pervukhin (17 April 1940 – May 15, 1944)
- Vyacheslav Malyshev (April 17, 1940 – May 15, 1944)
- Kliment Voroshilov (May 7, 1940 – 15 March 1946)
- Lavrentiy Beria (3 February 1941 – March 15, 1946)
- Lev Mekhlis (6 September 1940 – May 15, 1944)
- Maksim Saburov (March 10, 1941 – May 15, 1944)
- Vyacheslav Molotov (May 6, 1941 – August 16, 1942)
- Georgy Malenkov (May 15, 1944 – March 15, 1946)

=== Deputy chairman of the Council of Ministers ===
- Lavrentiy Beria (March 19, 1946 – March 5, 1953)
- Andrey Andreyev (March 19, 1946 – March 15, 1953 )
- Alexei Kosygin (March 19, 1946 – March 15, 1953, December 7, 1953 – December 25, 1956, July 5, 1957 – May 4, 1960)
- Anastas Mikoyan (19 March 1946 – March 15, 1953, April 27, 1954 – February 28, 1955)
- Nikolai Voznesensky (March 19, 1946 – March 7, 1949)
- Kliment Voroshilov (March 19, 1946 – March 15, 1953)
- Lazar Kaganovich (March 19, 1946 – March 6, 1947, December 18, 1947 – March 5, 1953)
- Georgy Malenkov (August 2, 1946 – March 5, 1953, February 9, 1955 – June 29, 1957)
- Maksim Saburov (February 8, 1947 – March 5, 1953, 7 December 1953 – February 28, 1955)
- Nikolai Bulganin (March 5, 1947 – April 7, 1950)
- Vyacheslav Malyshev (December 19, 1947 – March 15, 1953, December 7, 1953 – December 25, 1956)
- Alexey Krutikov (July 13, 1948 – February 8, 1949)
- Aleksandr Yefremov (March 8, 1949 – November 23, 1951)
- Ivan Tevosian (June 13, 1949 – March 15, 1953, December 7, 1953 – December 28, 1956)
- Mikhail Pervukhin (January 17, 1950 – March 15, 1953, 7 December 1953 – February 28, 1955)
- Panteleimon Ponomarenko (December 12, 1952 – March 15, 1953)
- Vladimir Kucherenko (February 28, 1955 – December 25, 1956)
- Pavel Lobanov (February 28, 1955 – April 9, 1956)
- Mikhail Khrunichev (February 28, 1955 – December 25, 1956 April 8, 1961 – June 2, 1961)
- Avraami Zavenyagin (February 28, 1955 – December 31, 1956)
- Vladimir Matskevich (April 9, 1956 – December 25, 1956)
- Dmitriy Ustinov (December 14, 1957 – March 13, 1963 )
- Alexander Zasyadko (March 31, 1958 – November 9, 1962)
- Joseph Kuzmin (March 31, 1958 – March 20, 1959)
- Nikolai Ignatov (May 4, 1960 – December 26, 1962)
- Vladimir Novikov (May 4, 1960 – November 24, 1962, March 26, 1965 – December 19, 1980)
- Konstantin Rudnev (June 10, 1961 – October 2, 1965)
- Benjamin Dymshitz (July 17, 1962 – December 20, 1980)
- Pyotr Lomako (November 10, 1962 – October 2, 1965)
- Dmitry Polyansky (November 23, 1962 – October 2, 1965)
- Alexander Shelepin (November 23, 1962 – December 9, 1965)
- Mikhail Lesechko (November 24, 1962 – October 24, 1980)
- Ignaty Novikov (November 24, 1962 – July 20, 1983)
- Leonid Smirnov (March 13, 1963 – November 15, 1985)
- Nikolai Baibakov (October 2, 1965 – October 14, 1985)
- Nikolai Tikhonov (October 2, 1965 – September 2, 1976)
- Vladimir Kirillin (Oct. 2, 1965 – January 22, 1980)
- Mikhail Yefremov (November 13, 1965 – October 29, 1971)
- Petro Shelest (May 19, 1972 – May 7, 1973)
- Zia Nureyev (3 April 1973 – November 1, 1985)
- Ivan Arkhipov (March 21, 1974 – October 27, 1980)
- Nikolai Martynov (June 25, 1976 – November 15, 1985)
- Konstantin Katushev (March 16, 1977 – July 29, 1982)
- Tikhon Kiselyov (December 5, 1978 – 23 October 1980)
- Gury Marchuk (January 28, 1980 – October 28, 1986)
- Valentin Makeyev (October 23, 1980 – January 20, 1983)
- Nikolai Talyzin (October 24, 1980 – October 14, 1985, October 1, 1988 – June 7, 1989)
- Leonid Kostandov (November 4, 1980 – September 5, 1984)
- Alexey Antonov (December 19, 1980 – October 1, 1988)
- Ivan Bodiul (December 19, 1980 – May 30, 1985)
- Boris Shcherbina (January 13, 1984 – June 7, 1989)
- Yakov Ryabov (September 27, 1984 – June 19, 1986)
- Ivan Silayev (1 November 1985 – October 9, 1990)
- Lev Voronin (November 15, 1985 – June 7, 1989)
- Yuri Maslyukov (November 15, 1985 – February 5, 1988)
- Yuri Batalin (December 20, 1985 – June 7, 1989)
- Gennady Vedernikov (June 19, 1986 – June 7, 1989)
- Vladimir Gusev (June 19, 1986 – December 26, 1990)
- Vladimir Kamentsev (September 1, 1986 – June 7, 1989)
- Boris Tolstykh (February 6, 1987 – June 7, 1989)
- Igor Belousov (February 12, 1988 – December 26, 1990)
- Aleksandra Biryukova (October 1, 1988 – September 17, 1990)
- Leonid Abalkin (July 17, 1989 – December 26, 1990)
- Vitaly Doguzhiev (July 17, 1989 – December 26, 1990)
- Nikolai Laverov (July 17, 1989 – December 26, 1990)
- Pavel Mostovoy ( July 17, 1989 – December 26, 1990)
- Lev Ryabev (July 17, 1989 – December 26, 1990)
- Stepan Sitaryan (October 24, 1989 – December 26, 1990)

Deputy Prime Minister of the USSR

- Nikolai Laverov (January 15, 1991 – November 26, 1991)
- Yuri Maslyukov (January 15, 1991 – November 26, 1991)
- Lev Ryabev (March 1, 1991 – November 26, 1991)
- Fedor Senko (March 1, 1991 – November 26, 1991)
- Vladimir Shcherbakov (March 1, 1991 – May 16, 1991)
- Bihojal Rakhimova (May 16, 1991 – November 26, 1991)

Deputy of the Committee on the operational management of the economy of the USSR

- Arkady Volsky (24 August 1991 – 25 December 1991)
- Yury Luzhkov (24 August – 29 October 1991)
- Grigory Yavlinsky (24 August – 25 December 1991)

Deputy of the Interstate Economic Committee of the Economic Community

- Gennady Kulik (November 18, 1991 – December 26, 1991)
- Amangeldy Bektemisov (November 29, 1991 – December 26, 1991)

== See also ==
- Premier of the Soviet Union
- First Deputy Premier of the Soviet Union
- List of leaders of the Soviet Union
