= First Deputy Premier of the Soviet Union =

Deputy head of government in the USSR

- Первый заместитель Председателя Совета Народных Комиссаров СССР (1923–1946); Первый заместитель Председателя Совета министров СССР (1946–1991); Первый заместитель премьер-министра СССР (1991)
- Emblem of the Soviet Union

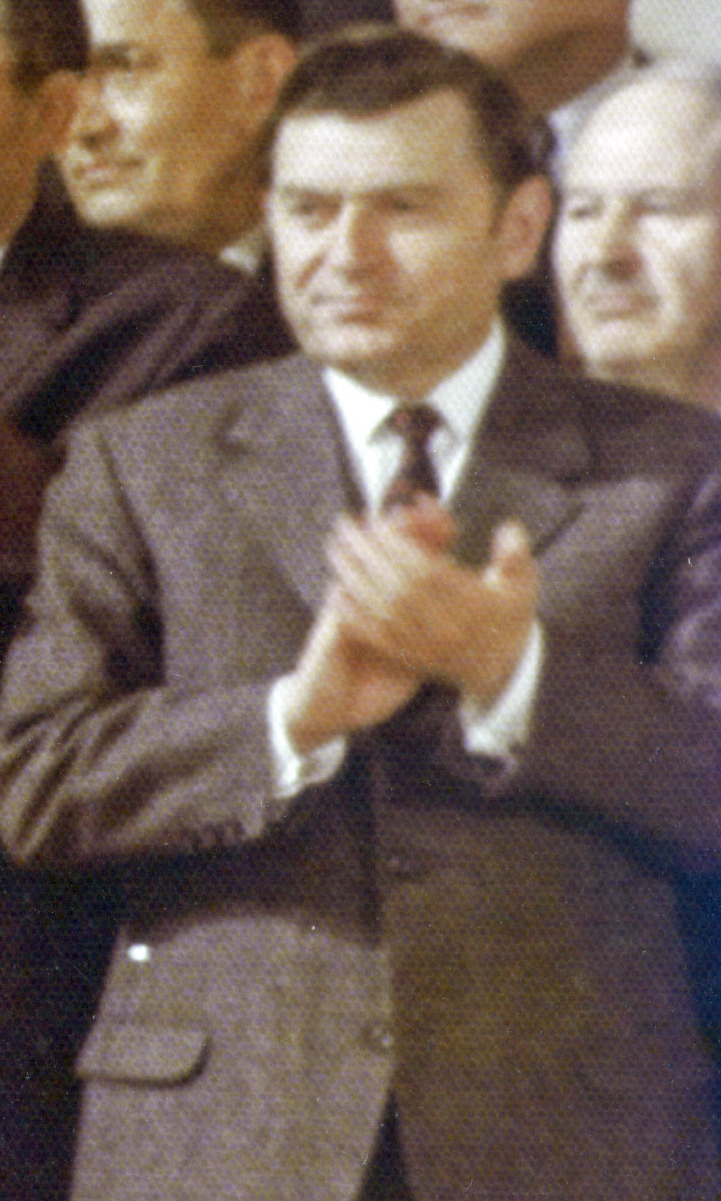
- Longest serving Kirill Mazurov; 26 March 1965 – 28 November 1978
- Type: Deputy head of government
- Reports to: Premier
- Formation: 14 May 1934
- First holder: Valerian Kuybyshev
- Final holder: Vladimir Shcherbakov
- Abolished: 26 November 1991
- Succession: First Deputy Prime Minister of Russia

The first deputy premier of the Soviet Union was the deputy head of government of the Union of Soviet Socialist Republics (USSR). Despite the title, the office was not always held by a single individual. The office bore three different titles throughout its existence: First Deputy Chairman of the Council of People's Commissars (1923–1946), First Deputy Chairman of the Council of Ministers (1946–1991), and First Deputy Prime Minister of the Soviet Union (1991). The term "first deputy premier" was used by outside commentators to describe the office of first deputy head of government.

A first deputy premier was responsible for a specific policy area. For example, Kirill Mazurov was responsible for industry, while Dmitry Polyansky was responsible for agriculture in the Soviet Union. In addition, an officeholder would be responsible for coordinating the activities of ministries, state committees, and other bodies subordinated to the government. It was expected that a First Deputy gave these organs guidance in an expeditious manner to ensure the implementation of plans for economic and social development and to check if the orders and decisions of the government were being followed. If the premier could not perform his duties one of the first deputies would take on the role of acting premier until the premier's return. During the late 1970s, when the health of Premier Alexei Kosygin deteriorated, First Deputy Premier Nikolai Tikhonov acted on his behalf as during his absence. Finally, a first deputy was by right a member of the government Presidium, its highest decision-making organ.

Twenty-six individuals held the office of first deputy premier. The first officeholder was Valerian Kuibyshev, who was inaugurated in 1934. Lavrentiy Beria spent the shortest time in office, serving for 113 days. At more than seventeen years, Vyacheslav Molotov spent the longest time in office, and held his position for most of Joseph Stalin's chairmanship, as well as through the chairmanships of Georgy Malenkov and Nikolai Bulganin.

== List of officeholders ==
No. (Note: These numbers are not official.)	Portrait	Name (Birth–Death)	Term of office			Premier	Other offices held while First Deputy Premier	Ref.
No.	Portrait	Name (Birth–Death)	Took office	Left office	Time in office	Premier	Other offices held while First Deputy Premier	Ref.
1		Valerian Kuybyshev (1888–1935)	14 May 1934	25 January 1935 †	256 days	Vyacheslav Molotov	Chairman of the Soviet People's Control Commission	
2		Nikolai Voznesensky (1895–1950)	10 March 1941	15 March 1946	5 years, 5 days	Vyacheslav Molotov Joseph Stalin	Chairman of the State Planning Commission	
3	A man in a dark suit, light shirt and dark tie, smiling	Vyacheslav Molotov (1890–1986)	16 August 1942	29 June 1957	11 years, 106 days	Joseph Stalin Georgy Malenkov Nikolai Bulganin	Minister of Foreign Affairs	
4		Nikolai Bulganin (1895–1975)	7 April 1950	8 February 1955	4 years, 307 days	Joseph Stalin Georgy Malenkov	Minister of Defence	
5		Lavrentiy Beria (1899–1953)	5 March 1953	26 June 1953	113 days	Georgy Malenkov	Minister of Internal Affairs	
6		Lazar Kaganovich (1893–1991)	5 March 1953	29 June 1957	4 years, 141 days	Georgy Malenkov Nikolai Bulganin Nikita Khrushchev	Minister of Building Materials Industry; Chairman of the State Committee of the Council of Ministers for Labour and Wages	
7		Anastas Mikoyan (1895–1978)	28 February 1955	15 July 1964	9 years, 138 days	Nikolai Bulganin Nikita Khrushchev	Main diplomat to Cuba during the Cuban Missile Crisis	
8		Mikhail Pervukhin (1904–1974)	28 February 1955	5 July 1957	2 years, 127 days	Nikolai Bulganin	Chairman of the State Economic Commission on Current Economic Planning	
9		Maksim Saburov (1900–1977)	28 February 1955	5 July 1957	2 years, 127 days	Nikolai Bulganin	Chairman of the State Planning Committee	
10		Joseph Kuzmin (1910–1996)	28 February 1955	5 July 1957	2 years, 127 days	Nikolai Bulganin	Chairman of the State Planning Committee	
11		Frol Kozlov (1908–1965)	31 March 1958	4 May 1960	2 years, 34 days	Nikita Khrushchev	Chairman of the State Planning Committee	
12		Alexei Kosygin (1904–1980)	4 May 1960	15 October 1964	4 years, 164 days	Nikita Khrushchev	—	
13		Dmitriy Ustinov (1908–1984)	13 March 1963	26 March 1965	2 years, 13 days	Nikita Khrushchev Alexei Kosygin	—	
14		Kirill Mazurov (1914–1989)	26 March 1965	28 November 1978	13 years, 247 days	Alexei Kosygin	First Secretary of the Communist Party of Byelorussia	
15		Dmitry Polyansky (1917–2001)	2 October 1965	2 February 1973	7 years, 123 days	Alexei Kosygin	—	
16		Nikolai Tikhonov (1905–1997)	2 September 1976	23 October 1980	4 years, 51 days	Alexei Kosygin	—	
17		Ivan Arkhipov (1907–1998)	27 October 1980	4 October 1986	5 years, 342 days	Nikolai Tikhonov Nikolai Ryzhkov	—	
18	A man in a dark suit with a red tie standing in front of the Azerbaijani flag	Heydar Aliyev (1923–2003)	24 November 1982	23 October 1987	4 years, 333 days	Nikolai Tikhonov Nikolai Ryzhkov	First Secretary of the Azerbaijan Communist Party	
19	A man in a dark suit, seated, looking to his left	Andrei Gromyko (1909–1989)	24 March 1983	2 July 1985	2 years, 100 days	Nikolai Tikhonov	Minister of Foreign Affairs	
20		Nikolai Talyzin (1929–1991)	14 October 1985	1 October 1988	2 years, 353 days	Nikolai Ryzhkov	Chairman of the State Planning Committee	
21		Vsevolod Murakhovski (1926–2017)	1 November 1985	7 June 1989	3 years, 218 days	Nikolai Ryzhkov	Chairman of the State Committee of the Council of Ministers for Agriculture	
22		Yuri Maslyukov (1937–2010)	5 February 1988	26 December 1990	2 years, 324 days	Nikolai Ryzhkov	Chairman of the State Planning Committee	
23		Lev Voronin (1928–2008)	17 July 1989	26 December 1990	1 year, 162 days	Nikolai Ryzhkov	—	
24		Vladilen Nikitin (1936–2021)	27 July 1989	30 August 1990	1 year, 34 days	Nikolai Ryzhkov	—	
25		Vladimir Velichko (born 1937)	15 January 1991	26 November 1991	315 days	Valentin Pavlov Ivan Silayev	Minister of Heavy Machine Building	
26		Vitaly Doguzhiyev (1935–2016)	15 January 1991	26 November 1991	315 days	Valentin Pavlov Ivan Silayev	—	
27		Vladimir Shcherbakov (born 1949)	16 May 1991	26 November 1991	194 days	Valentin Pavlov Ivan Silayev	—	

== See also ==
- Premier of the Soviet Union
- Deputy Premier of the Soviet Union
- List of leaders of the Soviet Union
