= Yuriy Nikolayevich Astakhov =

Soviet and Russian scientist in the field of Electric power system

Yuriy Nikolayevich Astakhov Юрий Николаевич Астахов
- Born: 1929 (age 96–97)
- Education: Moscow Power Engineering Institute
- Scientific career
- Fields: Electric power system

Yuriy Nikolayevich Astakhov (Russian: Юрий Николаевич Астахов; born in 1929) was a Soviet and Russian scientist in the field of Electric power system, professor.

== Biography ==
He was born in 1929.

In 1957 he graduated from the Moscow Power Engineering Institute. After graduation, he remained to study and work at the institute. In 1986 he defended his doctoral dissertation. He received a scientific degree of Doctor of Technical Sciences, academic title of professor.

Area of scientific interests: complex electric power systems, applications in power systems of energy storage.

Under the guidance of the scientist, more than forty candidate dissertations were prepared and successfully defended, a scientific school on electrical engineering was established in the Vinnitsa Polytechnic Institute.

Astakhov at various times was a member of the Scientific and Methodological Council under the administration of the All-Union Society "Znanie", the Scientific Council of the Academy of Sciences of the USSR on the complex problem "Scientific fundamentals of electrophysics and electric power engineering", sections of electrical engineering and energy of the Scientific and Technical Council of the State Committee for National Education of the USSR, member of the Presidium Scientific - methodological council for higher electric power equipment, participated in the work of several councils for awarding academic degrees.

Has received 19 copyright certificates and eight patents, is the author of about 150 scientific works including two monographs and three teaching aids.

== Literature ==
- Energy storage in electrical systems: [Proc. allowance for electricity. specialist. universities] / Yu. N. Astakhov, VA Venikov, AG Ter-Ghazaryan. - М.: Высш. Shk., 1989. - 158, [1] p. : ISBN 5-06-000105-9:
