= Mikhail Pervukhin =

Soviet politician (1904–1978)

- Михаил Первухин
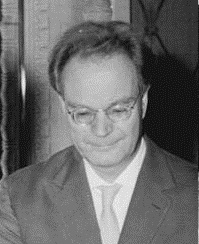
- Pervukhin in 1960

First Deputy Chairman of the Council of Ministers
- In office 28 February 1955 – 5 July 1957
- Premier: Nikolai Bulganin
- Preceded by: Anastas Mikoyan
- Succeeded by: Maksim Saburov

Minister of Chemical Industry
- In office 26 February 1942 – 17 January 1950
- Premier: Joseph Stalin
- Preceded by: Mikhail Denisov
- Succeeded by: Sergei Tikhomirov

Chairman of the State Economic Commission on Current Planning
- In office 25 December 1956 – 10 May 1957
- Premier: Nikolai Bulganin
- Preceded by: Maksim Saburov
- Succeeded by: Post abolished (Joseph Kuzmin as Gosplan chairman)

Minister of Medium Machine Building
- In office 30 April 1957 – 24 July 1957
- Premier: Nikolai Bulganin
- Preceded by: Avraami Zavenyagin
- Succeeded by: Efim P. Slavsky

Full member of the 19th Presidium
- In office 16 October 1952 – 6 March 1953

Candidate member of the 20th Presidium
- In office 29 June 1957 – 17 October 1961

Personal details
- Born: 14 October 1904 Yuryuzansky Zavod, Ufa Governorate, Russian Empire
- Died: 22 July 1978 (aged 73) Moscow, Russian SFSR, Soviet Union
- Party: CPSU (1919–1978)

Mikhail Georgiyevich Pervukhin (Russian: Михаи́л Гео́ргиевич Перву́хин; 14 October [O.S. 1 October] 1904 – 22 July 1978) was a Soviet politician and an engineer who served as people's commissar for various commissions under Stalin and Khrushchev presidiums.

He served as a First Deputy Chairman of the Council of Ministers from 1955 to 1957.

== Early life and career ==
He was born on 14 October 1904 in the village of Yuryuzansky Zavod, Ufa Governorate, Russian Empire to a Russian working-class family. Pervukhin was a political activist for the communist cause and became a party member of the Russian Communist Party in 1919. In August to September 1919, Pervukhin was a member of the Zlatoust city commission on the nationalisation of property belonging to the Russian bourgeoisie. He began working for the Zlatoust newspaper Borba in October 1919, and worked there until February 1920 when he started to attend after-school lessons. He fought alongside the Bolsheviks in the Russian Civil War in the South Urals. From October to November 1920, Pervukhin was a member of the Bolshevik squad quelling the anti-Bolshevik uprising in Chrysostom.

From January 1921 to mid-autumn Pervukhin worked as the Executive Secretary of the Proletarian Thought. He was a member of the Bureau of the Zlatoust Komsomol District Committee, and later became the head of its Department for Political Education in April 1922. Later that year he became the Zlatoust Komsomol District Committee's Deputy Secretary, and was its Technical Secretary from April to August 1922.

The Metal Workers' Union of the Zlatoust District Committee ordered Pervukhin to Moscow in the late summer of 1922 to study where he went to attend the Plekhanov Moscow Institute of the National Economy; he studied electrical engineering and found employment with the Moscow Electric Power Company in 1932. In May 1936, he became the Director of the Kashirskaya Power Plant. From June to September 1937, Pervukhin worked as Mosenergo's Chief Engineer, and later that year became its acting head. Pervukhin started to work for the People's Commissariat for Heavy Industry in late 1937, and was later appointed to the post of Deputy People's Commissar for Heavy Industry in 1938, and First Deputy People's Commissars for Heavy Industry in June 1937 when Lazar Kaganovich was People's Commissar for Heavy Industry.

During the Great Purge Pervukhin was promoted to Deputy Head of the Moscow Electrical Power Administration Bureau, and then its commissioner. On 24 January 1939 Pervukin was promoted to the newly established post of People's Commissar for Electric Power Stations and was given a seat in the Communist Party's Central Committee at the 18th Party Congress.

== World War II and the Stalin era ==
From 1940 to 1942, during World War II, Pervukhin served as a Deputy Chairman of the Council of People's Commissars (literally, Soviet Deputy Premier), and from 1943 until 1950 he served as the Minister of the Chemical Industry. Pervukhin, alongside Boris Vannikov, was Vyacheslav Molotov's deputy on the State Defense Committee's commission responsible for the development of the Soviet program of nuclear weapons since 1943. Along with Molotov, Pervukhin was a program manager of the commission's uranium project. When Joseph Stalin signed the State Defense Committee Resolution No. 9887, he established a Special Committee with emergency powers.

The Committee's main duty was to oversee the work of those who contributed to the development of the Soviet nuclear weapons. Stalin personally picked the members of the committee; Pervukhin was one of nine members. Pervukhin was the Deputy Chairman under Vannikov's Chairmanship of the First Main Directorate of the Council of People's Commissars, the executive branch of the special committee. He also served as Chairman of the State Commission on the RDS-1 testing at the Semipalatinsk Test Site.

In 1950 Pervuhkin was once again appointed Deputy Chairman of the Council of Ministers and in 1952, at the 19th Party Congress, he was elected a member of the Presidium, the renamed Politburo. At the 35th anniversary of the October Revolution in 1952, Pervukhin delivered the main speech at the Moscow Kremlin commemoration. If Stalin was absent or could not carry out his duty as Chairman of the Council of Ministers, government meetings would be chaired, in turn by Pervukhin, Lavrentiy Beria, or Maksim Saburov.

== Post-Stalin era ==
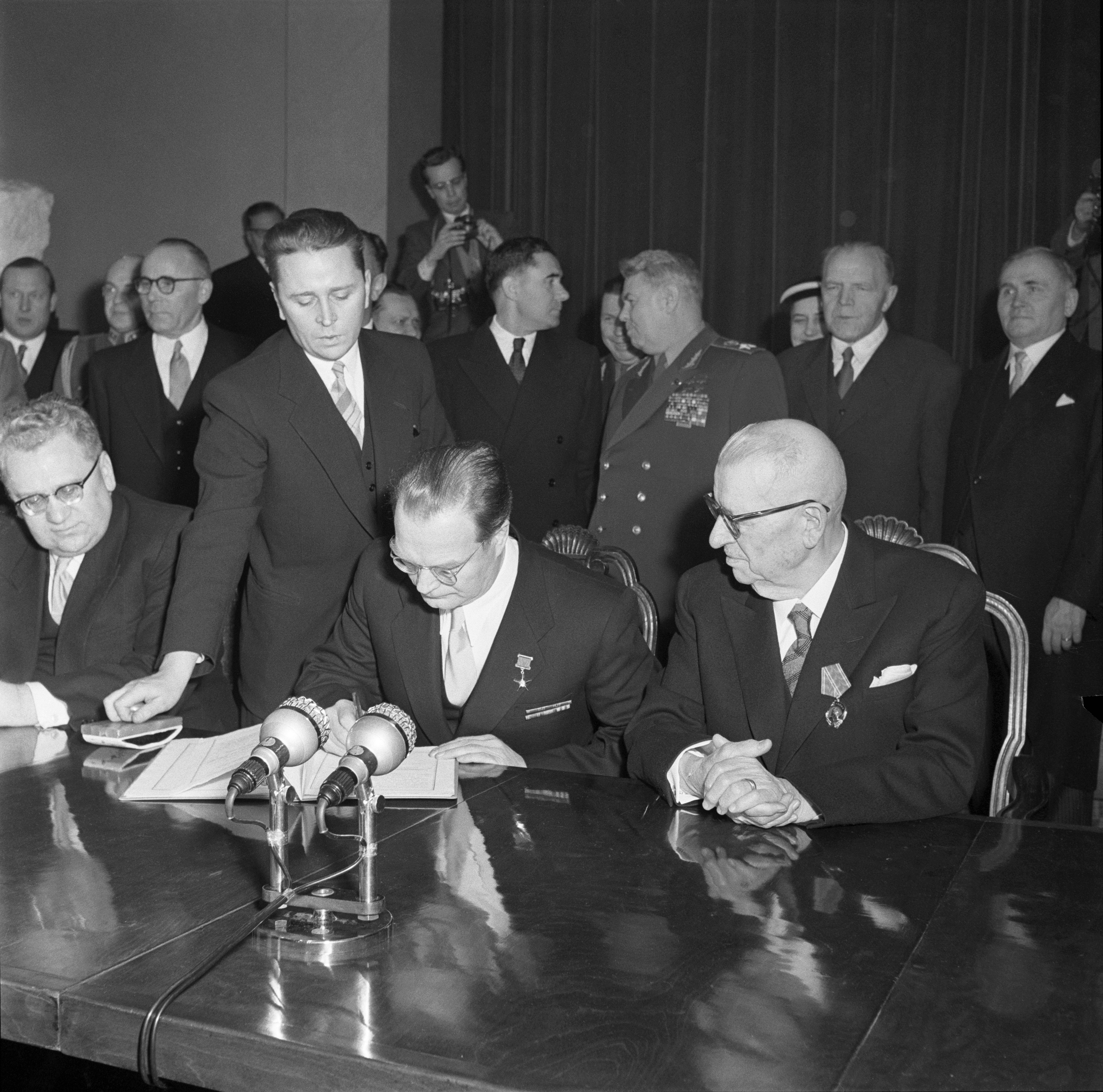
Mikhail Pervukhin signing of the restitution contract of Porkkala at the Embassy of the Soviet Union in Helsinki on January 26, 1956.

As part of the changes in the post-Stalin era, a collective leadership was established with both Georgy Malenkov and Nikita Khrushchev vying for control. At the very beginning, Pervukhin, along with Georgy Zhukov and Saburov, actively participated in foreign policy decision-making. Malenkov, the Chairman of the Council of Ministers, appointed Pervukhin the post of First Deputy Chairman of the Council of Ministers on 28 February 1955. From 5 March 1953 to 17 April 1954, Pervukhin was the Minister of Power and Electrical Industry, and from December 1953 to February 1955, he was Chairman of the Bureau for Energy, Chemical and Forest Industries of the Council of Ministers. On 25 December 1956 Nikolai Bulganin, the Chairman of the Council of Ministers, removed Saburov from his post as Chairman of the State Economic Commission on Current Planning and replaced him with Pervukhin. who held the post until 10 May 1957.

Pervukhin opposed Khrushchev's Regional Economic Soviet reform, whose main aim was to reduce the powers and functions of the central ministries. He told Khrushchev and other Presidium members that this reform would weaken branch administration, and that the centralisation and specialisation which had been the system's cornerstone would be lost. Instead, Pervukhin proposed to reduce the numbers of central ministries and establish territorial commissions to provide "horizontal cooperation". Later, in 1957, Pervukhin joined the Anti-Party Group in a bid to remove Khrushchev as First Secretary.

=== Ambassadorship to East Germany ===
Following the failed bid to remove Khrushchev, Pervukhin was demoted to a non-voting member of the Presidium, and became the Soviet Union's ambassador to East Germany in 1958. As ambassador, Pervukhin observed that "the presence in Berlin of an open and essentially uncontrolled border between the socialist and capitalist worlds unwittingly prompts the population to make a comparison between both parts of the city, which unfortunately, does not always turn out in favor of the Democratic [East] Berlin". Pervukin remained wary, until its very creation, of establishing a sectorial barrier between East and West Berlin; he believed that creating a barrier would increase anti-Soviet sympathies not only in Berlin but in Germany as well. Instead, he proposed three options: 1) "introducing restrictive measures" for East Germans to enter both East Berlin and West Berlin; 2) strengthening the border security; 3) stopping the free movement between the two cities. However, he did admit that closing the borders was a possibility, claiming that if the political situation worsened, the East German regime and the Soviets would not have another option.

Walter Ulbricht, the East German leader, invited Pervukhin to his summer house to discuss the East German immigration flow to West Germany. There Ulbricht told Pervukhin that if the Soviets did not react soon, East Germany would "collapse". Pervukhin discussed other problems as well, claiming that Ulbricht but also the East German leadership in general, were opposed to the Soviet Union's plan to improve relations with West Germany. When Khrushchev gave his approval to construct what would become the Berlin Wall, Pervukhin was the first to know. Ulbricht told Pervukhin of the need to create the East–West barrier at night, and he and Khrushchev would later agree to this.

At the 22nd Party Congress in 1961, Pevurkhin lost his seat in the Central Committee. He was succeeded in his post as Soviet ambassador to East Germany by Pyotr Abrasimov at the end of 1962.

== Decorations and awards ==
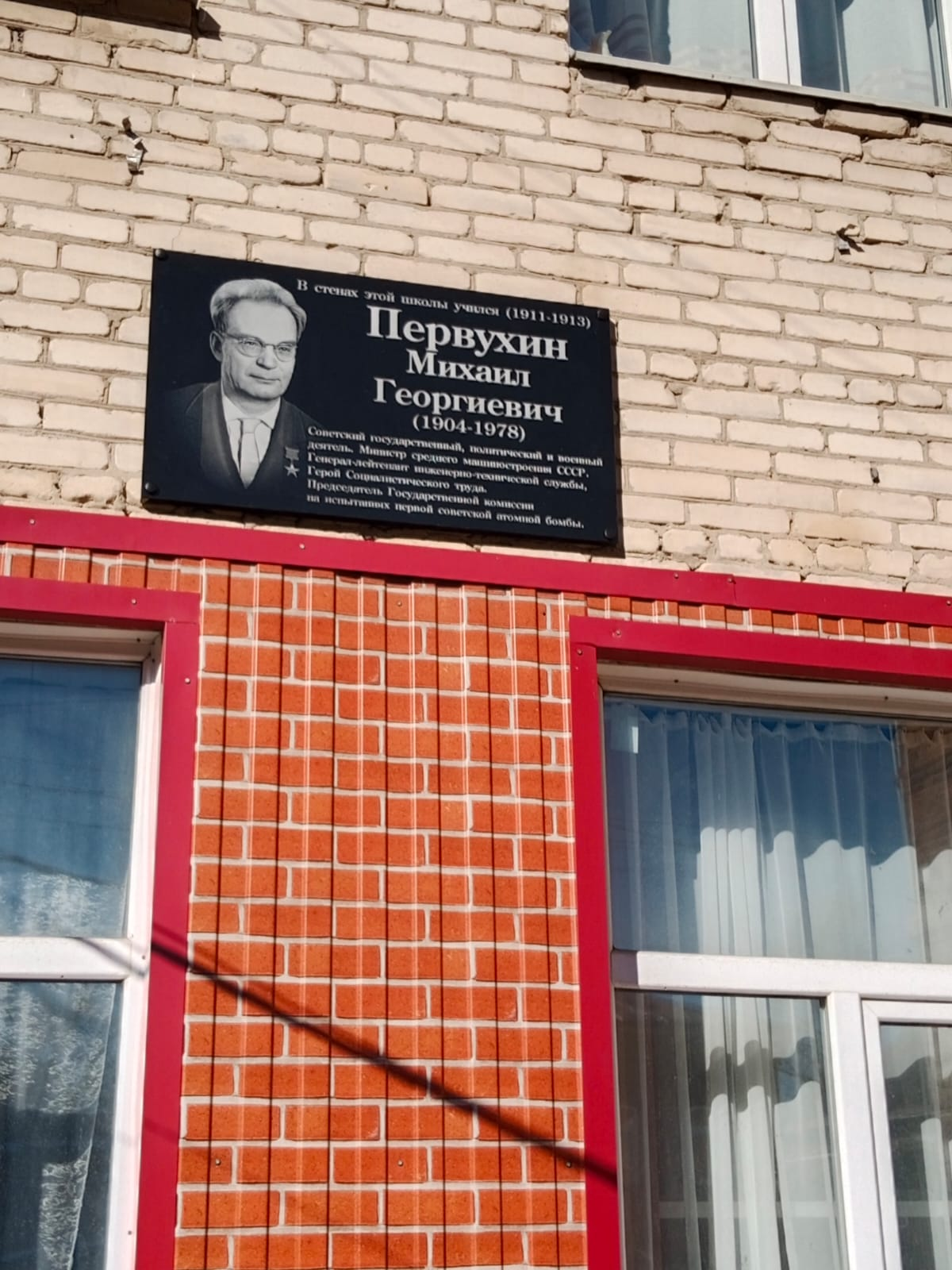
Memorial plaque at the school where Mikhail Pervukhin studied from 1911 to 1913

- Hero of Socialist Labour (1949)
- Five Orders of Lenin
- Order of the October Revolution
- Order of the Red Banner of Labour

== Bibliography ==
- Medvedev, Roy; Medvedev, Zhores (2006). The Unknown Stalin. I.B.Tauris. ISBN 1-85043-980-X.
- Harrison, Hope Millard (2003). Driving the Soviets up the Wall: Soviet–East German relations, 1953–1961. Princeton University Press. ISBN 0-691-09678-3.
- Smith, Jeremy (2009). Khrushchev in the Kremlin: Policy and Government in the Soviet Union, 1956–64. Taylor & Francis. ISBN 978-0-415-47648-5.
- Zubok, Vladislav Martinovich (2007). A Failed Empire: The Soviet Union in the Cold War from Stalin to Gorbachev. UNC Press Books. ISBN 978-0-8078-3098-7.
