= Nikolai Baibakov =

Soviet bureaucrat and economist (1911–2008)

- Николай Байбаков
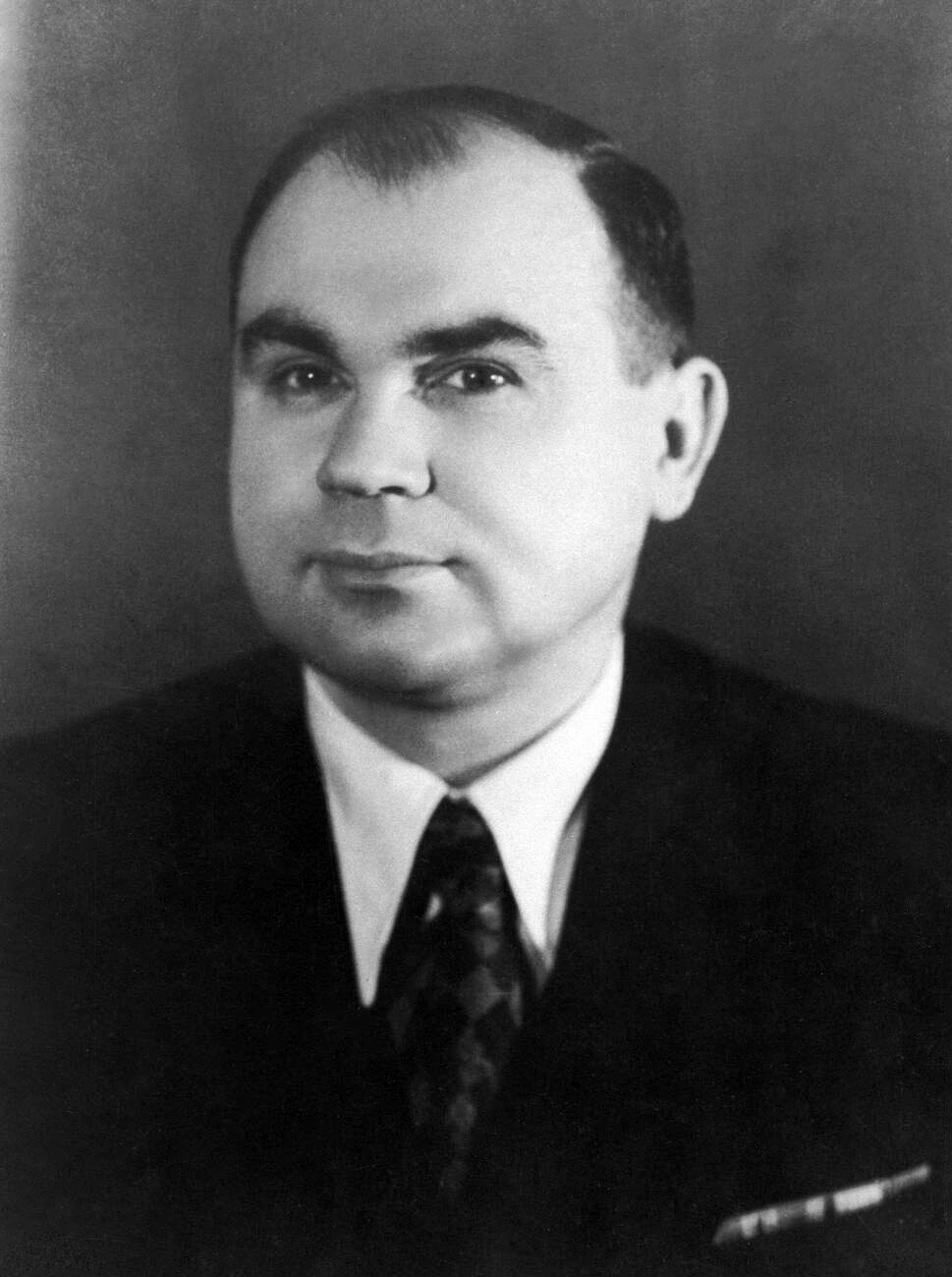
- Baibakov in 1946

Chairman of the State Planning Committee
- In office 2 October 1965 – 14 October 1985
- Premier: Alexei Kosygin; Nikolai Tikhonov
- Preceded by: Pyotr Lomako
- Succeeded by: Nikolai Talyzin
- In office 25 May 1955 – 3 May 1957
- Premier: Nikolai Bulganin
- Preceded by: Maksim Saburov
- Succeeded by: Joseph Kuzmin

Minister of Oil Industry
- In office 28 December 1948 – 25 May 1955
- Premier: Joseph Stalin; Georgy Malenkov; Nikolai Bulganin
- Preceded by: Position reestablished
- Succeeded by: Mikhail Evseenko
- In office 30 November 1944 – 4 March 1946
- Premier: Joseph Stalin
- Preceded by: Ivan Sedin
- Succeeded by: Position abolished (Position reestablished in 1948)

Personal details
- Born: 6 March 1911 Sabunchu, Caucasus Viceroyalty
- Died: 31 March 2008 (aged 97) Moscow, Russia
- Party: Communist Party of the Soviet Union (1939–1988)

Nikolai Konstantinovich Baibakov (Russian: Никола́й Константи́нович Байбако́в; 6 March 1911 – 31 March 2008) was a Soviet bureaucrat and economist who served as Minister of Oil Industry from 1944–1946 and 1948–1955, and Chairman of the State Planning Committee from 1955–1957 and 1965–1985. He was awarded a Hero of Socialist Labour in 1981.

== Biography ==
Born in Sabunchu, near Baku, Baibakov finished secondary school in 1928 and entered the Azerbaijan Oil and Chemistry Institute, from which he graduated in 1931 as a mining engineer, and worked for the oil industry in Azerbaijan. In 1935, he was drafted into the armed forces, in the Far East. After completing his military service, in January 1937, he returned to Azerbaijan and received rapid promotion during the Great Purge. After a few months, he was appointed chief of the oilfield production department in Azerbaijan, then in January 1938, he was transferred to Kuibyshev (Samara) as head of the association for oil production in east Russia. In 1940-44, he was Deputy People's Commissar for Oil under Lazar Kaganovich.

In 1941-42, Baibakov was responsible for evacuating oil industry facilities from Baku, Kuban and the North Caucasus to the eastern regions during the Nazi invasion. He was in Tuapse just before it was overrun by the Germans, and it was reported that he had been killed, though he had escaped through the woods, under heavy fire.

Baibakov was appointed to the Narkomat as People's Commissar for Oil, in November 1944. In 1948-68, he was Minister for Oil in the South and Western Regions. In 1948-55, he was the USSR Minister of Oil Industry. He was a member of the Central Committee of the Communist Party of the Soviet Union, 1952-61.

In May 1955, the USSR State Planning Committee, commonly known as Gosplan, was divided into two and Baibakov was appointed chairman of the part responsible for long-term planning, which retained the name, Gosplan. The historian, Robert Conquest, interpreted this as a maneouvre by Nikita Khrushchev to undermine his main rival, Georgy Malenkov in the struggle to succeed the former dictator, Joseph Stalin, with Baibakov being promoted because he was 'pliable', and not linked to either faction.

But he did not hold the post for long, evidently having clashed with Khrushchev, who had supplanted Malenkov as chairman of the USSR Council of Ministers. In May 1957, he was sidelined to the post of Chairman of the RSFSR Gosplan. In March 1958, he was appointed head of the Krasnodar regional economic council - a further demotion which meant that he lost his seat on the Central Committee, though in his memoirs he referred to this period as one he remembered "with special warmth."

Despite having lost favour with Khrushchev, Baibakov evidently had powerful allies, probably including Alexei Kosygin, who was First Deputy Chairman of the Council of Ministers as well as being a former Chairman of Gosplan. On 10 March 1963, Baibakov was brought back to Moscow as Chairman of the State Committee on Chemistry, but in January 1964, the committee was divided into three, and Baibakov was given the chairmanship of the least important of the successor bodies, the State Committee on Petroleum Extraction.

In September 1965, after Kosygin had replaced Khrushchev as head of government, Baibakov was reinstated as Chairman of the USSR Gosplan, Deputy Chairman of the Council of Ministers. He also had his membership of the Central Committee restored. He remained in this post for almost 20 years.

After stepping down in 1985, he continued to work as a state councillor in the Presidium of the Council of Ministers until 1988. Then he was appointed head of the oil and gas section of the Academic Board of the Oil and Gas Institute with the Russian Academy of Sciences. He died in 2008 in Moscow.

== Honours and awards ==
- Hero of Socialist Labour (1981)
- Order "For Merit to the Fatherland", 2nd class (March 7, 2006) - for outstanding services to the state
- Six Orders of Lenin
- Order of the October Revolution
- Order of the Red Banner of Labour, twice
- Lenin Prize (1963) - for the discovery and development of gas-condensate fields
- Honorary Member of the Russian Academy of Natural Sciences (RANS, established in 1996 was awarded the Medal of the Academy)
- Academician of the Academy of Cosmonautics
- Laureate of the "Russian National Olympus"
- Honorary Citizen of Ishimbai (Bashkortostan) - as an active participant in the development of the Bashkir oil industry (made with such an initiative in 1940)
- Istiglal Order (Azerbaijan)
