= Maksim Saburov =

Soviet politician and statesman (1900–1977)

- Максим Сабуров
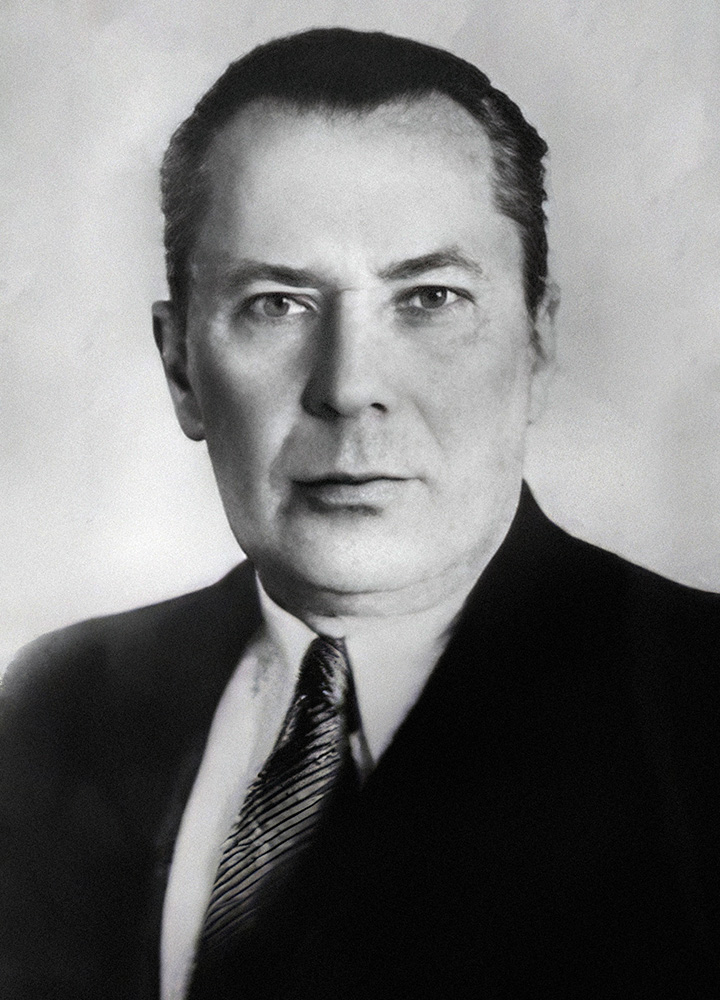
- Saburov in 1954

First Deputy Chairman of the Council of Ministers of the Soviet Union
- In office 28 February 1955 – 5 July 1957
- Premier: Nikolai Bulganin
- Preceded by: Mikhail Pervukhin
- Succeeded by: Joseph Kuzmin

Chairman of the State Economic Commission on Current Planning
- In office 25 May 1955 – 25 December 1956
- Premier: Nikolai Bulganin
- Preceded by: None (Himself as State Planning Chairman)
- Succeeded by: Mikhail Pervukhin

Chairman of State Planning Committee of the Soviet Union
- In office 29 June 1953 – 25 May 1955
- Premier: Georgy Malenkov
- Preceded by: Grigory Kosyachenko
- Succeeded by: Nikolai Baibakov
- In office 5 March 1949 – 5 March 1953
- Premier: Joseph Stalin
- Preceded by: Nikolai Voznesensky
- Succeeded by: Grigory Kosyachenko
- In office 10 March 1941 – 8 December 1942
- Premier: Joseph Stalin
- Preceded by: Nikolai Voznesensky
- Succeeded by: Nikolai Voznesensky

Full member of the 19th, 20th Presidium
- In office 16 October 1952 – 27 February 1957

Personal details
- Born: 19 February 1900 Druzhkivka, Yekaterinoslav Governorate, Russian Empire
- Died: 24 March 1977 (aged 77) Moscow, Russian SFSR, Soviet Union
- Citizenship: Soviet
- Party: Communist Party of the Soviet Union (1920-1961)

Maksim Zakharovich Saburov (Russian: Макси́м Заха́рович Сабу́ров; 19 February 1900 – 24 March 1977) was a Soviet engineer, economist and politician, three-time Chairman of Gosplan and later First Deputy Premier of the Soviet Union. He was involved in the Anti-Party Group's attempt to displace Nikita Khrushchev in 1957.

== Early life and career ==
Saburov was born in 1900 in the town of Druzhkivka in the Yekaterinoslav Governorate of the Russian Empire (present-day Ukraine) in a working-class family of Russian ethnicity. He joined the Communist Party in 1920, serving in a detachment with the aim of suppressing resistance to the Communist regime. He attended the Sverdlov Communist University between 1923 and 1926, then studied to become an engineer at the Bauman Moscow State Technical University in Moscow.

Between 1921 and 1926, Saburov was Secretary of the Bakhmut Komsomol Committee, and then that of the Kostiantynivka raion. Between 1926 and 1928, Saburov was a propagandist working in the Donets region. After five years of studying at the Bauman Institute, Saburov became head of the technological bureau of a factory in Moscow in 1933. Subsequently, he was head of the instrumental division of the Stalin Novokramatorsk Machine Plant until 1937.

Saburov advanced rapidly during the Great Purge, becoming a minister in the Narkomat for Heavy Machines in 1937, and then Gosplan Secretary for Machinery in 1938.

== Party career ==
In 1940, Saburov became First Deputy Chairman of Gosplan, the committee responsible for planning the Soviet economy, giving him wide-ranging powers over the Soviet economic apparatus, marking the beginning of the most notable period of his career in the Party. In 1947, Saburov became a member of the Supreme Soviet of the Soviet Union and in 1952 he became a member of the Central Committee of the CPSU. He served in the Presidium of this body until 1957, and he left the Committee in 1961.

=== Career in Gosplan ===
Saburov became full Chairman of Gosplan in 1941. Documents from the Russian State Economic Archives note that his responsibilities prior to assuming the chairmanship included personnel matters (he oversaw purges of unreliable employees in 1938) and mobilization efforts. He had a brief period in power here until 1942, when he was superseded by his predecessor Nikolai Voznesensky. After being demoted, Saburov moved between various bureaucratic posts in the supreme organs of Soviet government, first becoming a Deputy Chairman of Council of People's Commissars, a position he had also held during his Gosplan chairmanship, and then once more First Deputy Chairman of Gosplan in 1944. He was relegated to a Deputy Chairman of Gosplan in 1946. In 1947 he was made a Deputy Chairman of Council of Ministers.

In 1949 Saburov was made Chairman of Gosplan once again. In this function he helped to formulate and then presided over the fifth five-year plan. Saburov was partly responsible for the reconstruction of the Soviet Union after the Second World War: agricultural production in 1950 was barely above the 1940 level. Milk production was lower by 100,000 tons; meat production was only 12,000 tons higher. The Plan, which Saburov co-ordinated as the Chairman of Gosplan, succeeded in increasing coal production by 12 million tons, oil production by over 30 million tons, and electricity production by nearly 80 billion kW.

Saburov was temporarily displaced from his position as chairman in 1953, shortly after the death of Stalin, by Grigory Kosyachenko for a period of three months; however, many sources, such as Utechin, leave out this brief interlude in favour of Saburov having two terms. Under this short period of time, Saburov was Minister of Machinery.

In 1954 Saburov criticized the high rate of absenteeism in the Soviet Union, saying that labor productivity was "insufficient" and "further tightening" of "labor discipline" was required. He was responsible for helping to plan the Sixth Five-Year Plan, which would last from 1956 to 1961. However, in 1956 - after he had moved from being Chairman of Gosplan - Saburov, with the other planners, was criticized for having been unrealistic in planning.

Saburov was removed as chairman in 1955, becoming First Deputy Chairman of the Council of Ministers, and so the Deputy Premier of the Soviet Union. He was also made Chairman of the State Economic Commission for Short-Term Planning until 1956, when he was criticized for the Sixth Five-Year Plan, which was unprecedently sent back to the planners for revision.

=== First Deputy Premier ===
Saburov became First Deputy Premier in 1955. As the First Deputy Premier of the Soviet Union, Saburov agreed with Khrushchev that Soviet economic production would surpass that of the United States, saying at a Moscow embassy party that "the Soviet Union will draw even with the U.S. in the foreseeable future". Saburov was also responsible for using hard figures rather than percentages in the Five-Year Plan for the first time, giving the plan more meaning for experts.

Saburov, however, belonged more to the faction headed by Georgy Malenkov than to Khrushchev himself, and Malenkov was declining in power, being replaced in February 1955 by the rising Nikolai Bulganin as Chairman of Sovmin.

During preparations for the 20th Party Congress (1956), where Khrushchev planned to denounce Stalin, it was the position of Lazar Kaganovich, Vyacheslav Molotov and Kliment Voroshilov that the "greatness" of Stalin had to be stressed in spite of the purges. Saburov disagreed (as did Anastas Mikoyan) and stated: "If all this is true, it cannot be pardoned."

=== Anti-Party Group ===
In 1957, a failed attempt to depose Khrushchev was run by Malenkov, Kaganovich and Molotov, known as the Anti-Party Group. Saburov, being a friend of Malenkov, was implicated in the coup attempt and removed from his position as First Deputy Premier. Malenkov, in this period was condemned as "loathsome", thus also bringing Saburov into the purge.

Saburov recanted, saying that "It is well known, comrades, that I made a mistake in June 1957 by displaying political instability in the struggle of the Central Committee of the Soviet CP against the anti-Party group." Saburov worked as Deputy Chairman of Comecon for a short period of time afterwards, before moving to a factory in Syzran, which he managed until his retirement in 1966.

== Decorations and awards ==
- Three Orders of Lenin
- Order of the Red Banner of Labour
