= Mikhail Yefremov (politician) =

Soviet politician and diplomat

- Михаил Ефремов
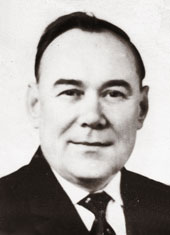

Soviet Ambassador to Austria
- In office 10 March 1975 – 24 October 1986
- Preceded by: Averky Aristov
- Succeeded by: Gennady Shikin

Soviet Ambassador to East Germany
- In office 30 October 1971 – 7 March 1975
- Preceded by: Peter Abrassimov
- Succeeded by: Peter Abrassimov

Personal details
- Born: Mikhail Timofeyevich Yefremov; 22 May 1911 Nikolayevka, Samara Governorate, Russian Empire
- Died: 19 March 2000 (aged 88) Moscow, Russia
- Party: Communist Party of the Soviet Union (1931–1986)
- Education: Kuybyshev Industrial Institute

Mikhail Timofeyevich Yefremov (Russian: Михаил Тимофеевич Ефремов; 22 May [O.S. 9 May] 1911 – 19 March 2000), was a Soviet politician and diplomat.

In 1931 he graduated from the Samara Electro-Technical School and went on to work in the Chief Inspectorate of the Samara Energy Plant from 1931—1933. After serving in the Red Army from 1933—1934, he studied at the Kuybyshev Industrial Institute from 1938—1941.

From 1943 to 1951 he served in various positions of the Kuybyshev Regional Committee of the All-Union Communist Party (bolsheviks), and served as First Secretary of the same Committee from October 1952 to December 1959.

From 1959 until 1965 he served in various positions of the CPSU when from 13 November 1965 he became Deputy Chairman of the Council of Ministers, a position he held under 29 October 1971.

In 1971 he was accorded the diplomatic rank of Ambassador Extraordinary and Plenipotentiary, and his first diplomatic posting came when he was presented his Letter of Credence in East Berlin on 30 October 1971 as the Ambassador of the Soviet Union to East Germany. He was Ambassador to East Germany until 7 March 1975, when on 10 March 1975 he began his next posting as Ambassador of the Soviet Union to Austria. He served as Soviet ambassador in Vienna until his retirement on 26 October 1986.
