= Alexey Krutikov (politician) =

Soviet politician and statesman

- Алексей Крутиков
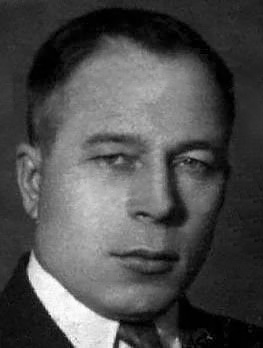
- Born: January 2, 1902; Filyaevo, Gryazovetsky Uyezd of Vologda Governorate
- Died: 1962 (aged 59–60); Moscow
- Occupation(s): school teacher, statesman
- Years active: 1938–1954

Signature
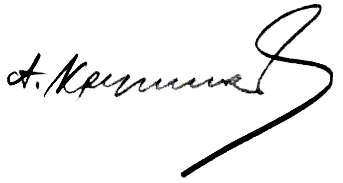

Alexey Dmitrievich Krutikov (1902–1962) was a Soviet statesman and politician who served as Deputy People's Commissar (1940–1946) / Deputy Minister (1946–1948) for Foreign Trade in 1940-1948 and Deputy Chairman of the Council of Ministers of the USSR in 1948-1949.

== Early life ==
Krutikov was born in Filyaevo village, Gryazovetsky Uyezd of Vologda Governorate in peasant family. In 1917–1921 he finished a telegraphy school and worked as telegraphist. In 1924 was drafted to the Red Army. Later he accomplished the High pedagogical courses in Leningrad (1932) and worked as a school teacher in Pskov and Novgorod till 1934.

== Awards and decorations ==
- Order of Lenin (twice)
- Medal "For Valiant Labour in the Great Patriotic War 1941–1945"
- Medal "For the Defence of Moscow"
- Battalion commissar
