= Mikhail Krunichev =

Soviet statesman

Mikhail Vasilyevich Krunichev (Russian: Михаи́л Васи́льевич Хруничев; 4 April [O.S. 22 March] 1901 – June 2, 1961) was a Soviet statesman, lieutenant-general in the technical and engineering corps (1944), who was awarded the title of Soviet Hero of Socialist Labour in 1945.

Krunichev became a member of the Communist Party of the Soviet Union (Russian: Коммунистическая Партия Советского Союза or КПСС) in 1921. He was Minister of Aviation Industry from 1946, and Deputy Chairman of the Council of Ministers from 1955 to 1957 and again in 1961.
