= Gosplan =

Soviet government agency responsible for economic planning

State Planning Committee of the USSR (Gosplan)
- Gosudarstvenny komitet po planirovaniyu Государственный комитет по планированию
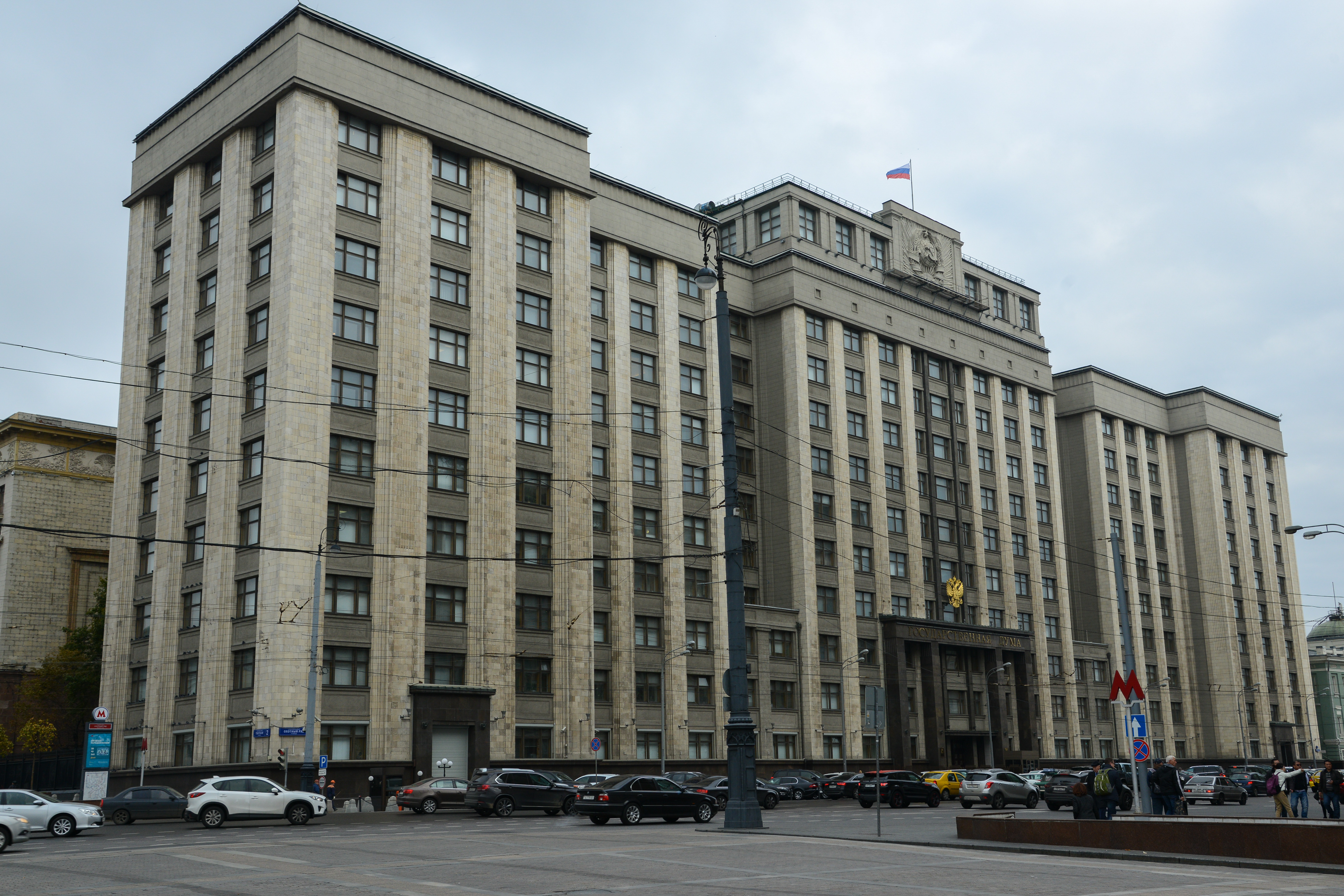
- Soviet Gosplan headquarters in Moscow (later Russian State Duma building)

State committee overview
- Formed: 22 February 1921
- Preceding State committee: RSFSR State Planning Committee
- Dissolved: 1 April 1991
- Jurisdiction: Government of the Soviet Union
- Headquarters: Moscow, RSFSR; 55°45′27″N 37°36′55″E
- Parent department: Council of Ministers
- Child State committee: Central Statistical Directorate

The State Planning Committee, commonly known as Gosplan (Russian: Госплан [ɡosˈpɫan]), was the agency responsible for central economic planning in the Soviet Union. Established in 1921 and remaining in existence until the dissolution of the Soviet Union in 1991, Gosplan had as its main task the creation and administration of a series of five-year plans governing the economy of the USSR.

== History ==
=== Economic background ===
The time of the October Revolution and the Russian Civil War which followed was a period of virtual economic collapse. Production and distribution of necessary commodities were severely tested as factories were shuttered and major cities such as Petrograd (now Saint Petersburg) were depopulated, with urban residents returning to the countryside to claim a place in land redistribution and in order to avoid the unemployment, lack of food, and lack of fuel which had become endemic. By 1919 the country was in hyperinflation, further pushing the struggling economic system of Soviet Russia towards total collapse.

An ad hoc system remembered to history as military communism emerged. The Soviet government's Council of Workers' and Peasants' Defense rushed from economic bottleneck to economic bottleneck in a frenzied effort to sustain what remained of Russian industry on behalf of the Red Army, locked in a life or death struggle with the anti-Bolshevik White movement, backed by the foreign military intervention of Great Britain, France, Japan, the United States, and other countries. In the countryside food requisitions, often backed by brute force, took place under the nominal auspices of the People's Commissariat of Agriculture.

In the midst of such chaos the mere idea of long-term economic planning remained a utopian dream during these first years of existence of Soviet Russia. It was not until the Civil War had drawn to a successful conclusion for the Bolsheviks in 1920 that serious attention was paid to the question of systematic planning for the Soviet economy. In March 1920 the Council of Workers' and Peasants' Defense was given a new name – the Council of Labor and Defense (STO) – and a broader planning mission.

STO was established as a commission of the Council of People's Commissars (Sovnarkom), to be headed by the leading People's Commissars themselves, a representative of the Russian trade unions, and the chief of the Central Statistical Agency. STO was directed to establish a single economic plan for Soviet Russia and to direct the work of the individual People's Commissariats toward this plan's fulfillment, so that "for the first time the RSFSR had a general planning organ with clearly defined functions", as historian E. H. Carr has observed.

The State Committee for Planning, commonly known as "Gosplan", was launched as a permanent advisory subcommittee of STO, assigned with the task of conducting detailed economic investigations and providing expert recommendations to the decision-making STO.

=== Establishment ===
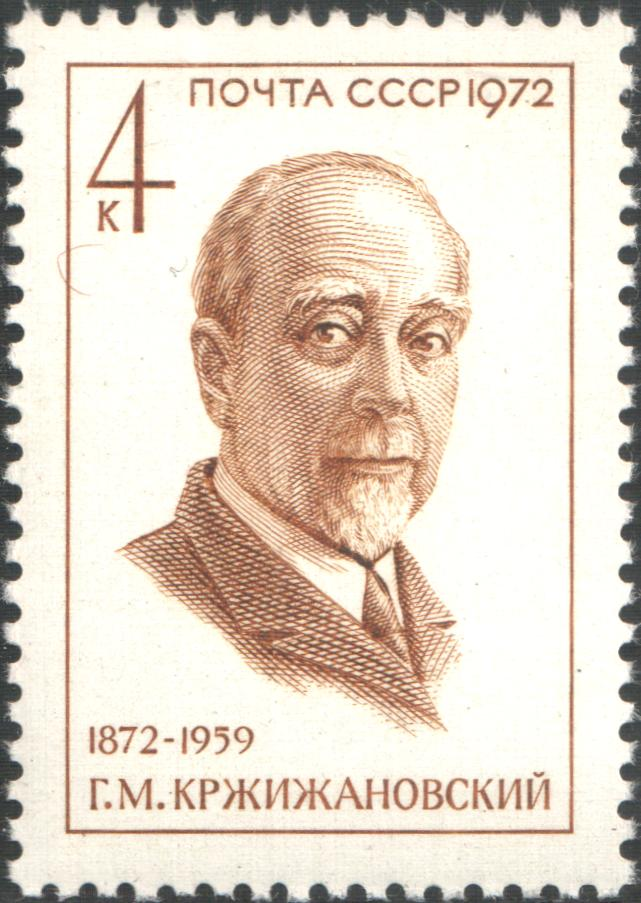
Gleb Krzhizhanovsky, first head of Gosplan, as he appeared on a 1972 Soviet postage stamp

Gosplan was formally established by a Sovnarkom decree, dated 22 February 1921. Ironically, the decree was passed on the same day that an article by Soviet leader V. I. Lenin was published in Pravda criticizing advocates of a "single economic plan" for their "idle talk" and "boring pedantry" and arguing that the GOELRO plan for national electrification was the "one serious work on the question of the single economic plan". Other members of Sovnarkom were more optimistic, however, and Lenin sustained a defeat on the establishment of another planning entity, Gosplan. As a compromise measure uniting the mission of the two planning entities, head of GOELRO Gleb Krzhizhanovsky was tapped to head Gosplan.

Initially Gosplan had an advisory function, with its entire staff consisting of just 34 people at the time of its April 1921 launch. These were selected on the basis of academic expertise in specialized aspects of industry; just 7 were members of the Russian Communist Party (bolsheviks). With the ongoing turn to a market-based system of production as part of the New Economic Policy (NEP), very real constraints existed on the possible extent of central planning during the initial phase of Gosplan's institutional life.

Gosplan quickly became a centre point for central planning and expanded investment in heavy industry, with Leon Trotsky one of the leading political patrons of the agency. In June 1922 a new decree further expanded Gosplan's purview, with the agency directed to compose both "long-term" and "immediate" plans of production. Gosplan was to be consulted regarding proposed economic and financial decrees submitted to the Council of People's Commissars by the various economic People's Commissariats. An administrative rivalry ensued between Gosplan and the People's Commissariat of Finance (Narkomfin), the latter the agency most in favor of currency stabilization and expansion of the general economy through the regulated market.

Gosplan had no power of compulsion in this early interval, but was forced to work through Sovnarkom, STO, or the People's Commissariats to have its suggestions implemented by decree. The agency's economic calculations and policy suggestions remained largely abstract throughout the first half of the 1920s, with Gosplan's desires and actual policy largely disjointed.

=== Emergence ===
Tension continued between Narkomfin and Gosplan throughout the NEP period, with Narkomfin advocating for increased grain exports as a means of bolstering the currency by balancing imports and exports while simultaneously bolstering peasant prosperity, while Gosplan emerged as the chief advocate of cheap food and planned development of industry.

During 1925 Gosplan started creating annual economic plans, known as "control numbers" (контрольные цифры).

Its work was coordinated with the USSR Central Statistical Directorate, the People's Commissariat of Finance, and the Supreme Soviet of the National Economy (VSNKh), and later with the State Bank (Gosbank) and State Supply Committee (Gossnab).

=== Five-year plan ===
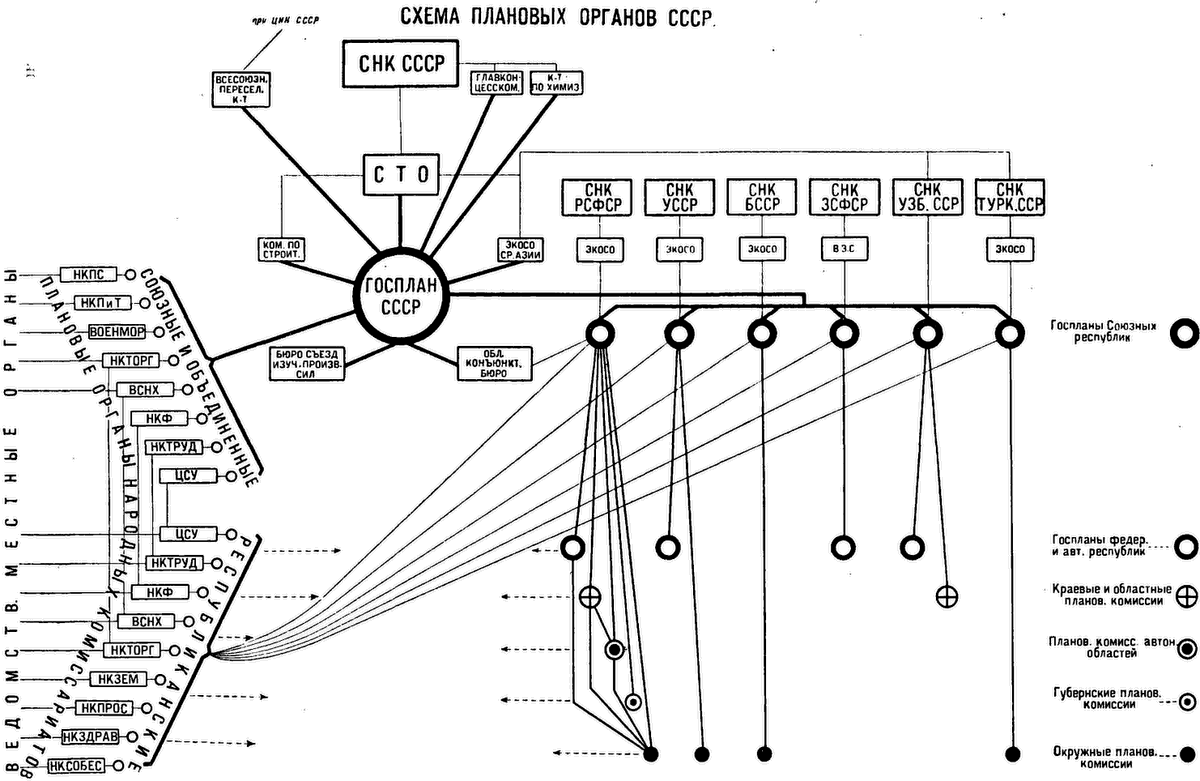
Gosplan organization chart

With the introduction of five-year plans in 1928, Gosplan became responsible for their creation and supervision according to the objectives declared by the All-Russian Communist Party (Bolsheviks).

During 1930 the Statistical Directorate was merged into Gosplan, and on 3 February 1931 Gosplan was resubordinated to the Sovnarkom.

During May 1955 Gosplan was divided into two commissions: the USSR Council of Ministers State Commission for Advanced Planning and the USSR Council of Ministers Economic Commission on Current Planning. These were, respectively, tasked with predictive and immediate planning. The work of the latter was based on the five-year plans delivered by Gosplan, with Gosplan planning 10–15 years ahead.

Gosplan was headquartered at the building now occupied by the State Duma, in Moscow.

== Method of material balances ==
The introduction of the first five-year plan in 1928 led to a re-examination of the roles of Gosplan and VSNKh, the supreme state organization for management of the economy at this time. This re-examination of roles was required because VSNKh itself also had responsibility for planning through the Industrial Planning Commission (Promplan). Re-examination of roles was also required as the introduction of the first five-year plan meant that Gosplan's role was no longer one of prognosis and drafting of "control figures" since plans had now become orders to act.

In order to ensure the success of the plan it was necessary to ensure that inputs from one part of the economy matched outputs from another part of the economy. Gosplan achieved this using a methodology called the system of "material balances". For a plan period (in detail for one year and in lesser detail for a five-year plan) Gosplan drew up a balance sheet in terms of units of material (i.e. money was not used as part of the accounting process).

The first step in the process was to assess how much steel, cement, wool cloth, etc. would be available for the next year. This calculation was based on the following formula: production minus exports plus imports plus or minus changes in stocks.

The planning system as such was fairly simple. Gosplan calculated the sum of the country's resources and facilities, established priorities for their use, and handed down output targets and supply allocations to the various economic ministries and through them to every branch and enterprise in the entire economy. To be sure, the system had its limitations, including the absence of meaningful price and cost information and the difficulty of extending planning to all the special commodities and enterprises in a modern economy. More serious difficulties stemmed from the attitudes and priorities built into the Stalinist planning system. "From the start," write the Soviet economists Nikolai Shmelev and Vladimir Popov, "the administrative system was distinguished by economic romanticism, profound economic illiteracy, and incredible exaggeration of the real effect that the 'administrative factor' had on economic processes and on the motivations of the public."

— Robert V. Daniels

The second step was to identify where there were mismatches between levels of outputs of one material that was used as an input in another part of the economy i.e. where there were differences between supply and demand within the economy. If mismatches between supply and demand were identified then, for the one-year plan, utilization plans for a particular input material could be cut or alternatively effort was made to increase supply. For the five-year plan mismatches between supply and demand could be mitigated by modifying long-term plans to increase productive capacity.

Wages and pensions were leveled upwards, and skilled and manual work began to exceed much mental and professional work in remuneration. The Italian economic historian Rita Di Leo found "a compression of differentials" and a bias for so-called "productive" work (i.e., yielding measurable physical output) over "unproductive" work (services, trade, etc.). "Such a wage policy calls into question the modernization of society, its efficiency, its competitiveness."

— Robert V. Daniels

Using this method any changes in the plan to remove mismatches between inputs and outputs would result in hundreds, even thousands, of changes to material balances. This meant that, without the aid of information technology, Gosplan could only deal with the economy in very general terms.

Ideological bias resulted in unrealistic plans that were impossible to execute. Pressure to execute them anyway resulted in widespread falsification of statistics on all levels of reporting. Falsified plan realization feedback further resulted in Gosplan preparing plans even more detached from reality:

The second economy engulfed a significant fraction of the GDP. Not only individuals but state enterprises as well engaged in these practices, often out of necessity, when extra-legal influence or illegal operations appeared to be the only way to fulfill the demands of the plan. Claims of plan fulfillment that were passed up the hierarchy became as impossible to believe as the targets in the next plan.

— Robert V. Daniels

== Directors of Gosplan ==
Name	Dates		Premier(s) served
Name	Began office	Ended office	Premier(s) served
State Planning Commission
Gleb Krzhizhanovsky (1st term)	13 August 1921	11 December 1923	Vladimir Lenin
Alexander Tsuryupa	11 December 1923	18 November 1925	Vladimir Lenin, Alexey Rykov
Gleb Krzhizhanovsky (2nd term)	18 November 1925	10 November 1930	Alexey Rykov
Valerian Kuibyshev	10 November 1930	25 April 1934	Vyacheslav Molotov
Valery Mezhlauk (1st term)	25 April 1934	25 February 1937	Vyacheslav Molotov
Gennady Smirnov	25 February 1937	17 October 1937	Vyacheslav Molotov
Valery Mezhlauk (2nd term)	17 October 1937	1 December 1937	Vyacheslav Molotov
Nikolai Voznesensky (1st term)	19 January 1938	10 March 1941	Vyacheslav Molotov
Maksim Saburov (1st term)	10 March 1941	8 December 1942	Joseph Stalin
Nikolai Voznesensky (2nd term)	8 December 1942	9 January 1948	Joseph Stalin
State Planning Committee
Nikolai Voznesensky	9 January 1948	5 March 1949	Joseph Stalin
Maksim Saburov (2nd term)	5 March 1949	5 March 1953	Joseph Stalin
Grigory Kosyachenko	5 March 1953	29 June 1953	Georgy Malenkov
Maksim Saburov (3rd term)	29 June 1953	25 May 1955	Georgy Malenkov
State Economic Commission for Advanced Planning
Nikolai Baibakov (1st term)	25 May 1955	3 May 1957	Nikolai Bulganin
Joseph Kuzmin	3 May 1957	10 May 1957	Nikolai Bulganin
State Economic Commission for Current Planning
Maksim Saburov	25 May 1955	25 December 1956	Nikolai Bulganin
Mikhail Pervukhin	25 December 1956	10 May 1957	Nikolai Bulganin
State Planning Committee
Joseph Kuzmin	10 May 1957	20 March 1959	Nikolai Bulganin, Nikita Khrushchev
Alexei Kosygin	20 March 1959	4 May 1960	Nikita Khrushchev
Vladimir Novikov	4 May 1960	17 July 1962	Nikita Khrushchev
Veniamin Dymshits	17 July 1962	24 November 1962	Nikita Khrushchev
Pyotr Lomako	24 November 1962	2 October 1965	Nikita Khrushchev, Alexei Kosygin
Nikolai Baibakov (2nd term)	2 October 1965	14 October 1985	Alexei Kosygin, Nikolai Tikhonov, Nikolai Ryzhkov
Nikolai Talyzin	14 October 1985	5 February 1988	Nikolai Ryzhkov
Yuri Maslyukov	5 February 1988	1 April 1991	Nikolai Ryzhkov, Valentin Pavlov

== See also ==
- Hyperinflation in early Soviet Russia
- Planned economy
- Economic calculation problem
