= Vladimir Novikov (politician, born 1907) =

Soviet politician

- Владимир Новиков
- Novikov in 1962

Chairman of the State Planning Committee
- In office 4 May 1960 – 17 July 1962
- Premier: Nikita Khrushchev
- Preceded by: Alexei Kosygin
- Succeeded by: Veniamin Dymshits

2nd Chairman of the Supreme Soviet of the National Economy
- In office 24 November 1962 – 2 October 1965
- Premier: Nikita Khrushchev; Alexei Kosygin
- Preceded by: Dmitry Ustinov
- Succeeded by: None—post abolished

Personal details
- Born: 6 December 1907 Kresttsy, Novgorod Governorate, Russian Empire
- Died: 21 July 2000 (aged 92) Moscow, Russia
- Party: Communist Party of the Soviet Union

Vladimir Nikolayevich Novikov (Russian: Владимир Николаевич Новиков; 6 December [O.S. 23 November] 1907 – 21 July 2000) was a Soviet and Russian statesman who was the Chairman of the State Planning Committee from 1960 to 1962 and Chairman of the Supreme Soviet of the National Economy from 1962 to 1965.

== General References ==
- Указ Президиума Верховного Совета СССР Указ Президиума Верховного Совета СССР «О присвоении звания Героя Социалистического Труда товарищам Быховскому А. И., Ванникову Б. Л., Гонор Л. Р., Еляну А. С., Новикову и Устинову Д. Ф.» от 3 июня 1942 года // Ведомости Верховного Совета Союза Советских Социалистических Республик : газета. — 1942. — 15 июня (No. 22 (181)). — С. 1.
