= State Committee of the Soviet Union =

Inter-agency body of the central government of the USSR

A State Committee of the Soviet Union was a central government body within the Government of the Union of Soviet Socialist Republics. Unlike a ministry, which was responsible for the management of the country's economic and social resources within a particular field of development or activity, a state committee was acting on an inter-agency level.

The state committees were primarily responsible for several parts of government as opposed to the one specific topic for which a ministry was solely responsible. Therefore, many state committees had jurisdiction over certain common activities performed by ministries such as research and development, standardisation, planning, building construction, state security, publishing, archiving and so on. State committees were instrumental in keeping the vast Soviet economic system coherent and integrated.

State committees were not directly subordinate to the Soviet Government—rather the heads of state committees (along with ministers) formed the government (cabinet) such as the Council of People's Commissars (1922–1946), Council of Ministers (1946–1991) or the Cabinet of Ministers (1991).

== List of committees ==
All-Union State Committee

- State Defense Committee
- State Committee on Science and Technology
- State Committee for Standards and Product Quality Management
- State Committee for Computer Science Informatics
- State Committee for Hydrometeorology
- State Committee for Foreign Economic Relations
- State Committee for Inventions and Discoveries

Union-Republican state committees

- State Planning Committee
- State Committee for Construction
- State Committee for Defense Technology
- State Committee for Metallurgy
- State Committee for Transport Construction
- State Committee for Fuel Industry
- State Committee for Material and Technical Supply
- State Committee for Labour and Social Problems
- State Committee for Prices
- State Committee on Statistics
- State Committee on National Issues
- State Committee for Vocational and Technical Education
- State Committee on Television and Radio
- State Committee for Cinematography
- State Committee for Publishing, Printing and Book Trade
- State Committee for Forestry
- State Committee for Nature Protection
- State Committee for Physical Culture and Sport
- State Committee for Supervision over Safety Works in Industry and Atomic Energy
- Committee for State Security

== See also ==
- State Council of the Soviet Union (August-December 1991)
