= Nikolai Talyzin =

Soviet bureaucrat and economist (1929–1991)

- Николай Талызин

First Deputy Chairman of the Council of Ministers
- In office 14 October 1985 – 1 October 1988 Serving with Ivan Arkhipov, Heydar Aliyev, Vsevolod Murakhovsky and Yuri Maslyukov
- Premier: Nikolai Ryzhkov

Chairman of State Planning Committee
- In office 14 October 1985 – 5 February 1988
- Premier: Nikolai Ryzhkov
- Preceded by: Nikolai Baibakov
- Succeeded by: Yuri Maslyukov

Minister of Communications
- In office 3 September 1975 – 24 October 1980
- Premier: Alexei Kosygin
- Preceded by: Nikolay Psurtsev
- Succeeded by: Vasily Shamshin

Candidate member of the 26th, 27th Politburo
- In office 15 October 1985 – 20 September 1989

Full member of the 26th, 27th Central Committee
- In office 3 March 1981 – 14 July 1990

Personal details
- Born: 28 January 1929 Moscow, Russian SFSR, Soviet Union
- Died: 23 January 1991 (aged 61) Moscow, Russian SFSR, Soviet Union
- Party: Communist Party of the Soviet Union (1960–1990)
- Education: Moscow Technical University of Communications and Informatics

Nikolai Vladimirovich Talyzin (Russian: Николай Владимирович Талызин; 28 January 1929 – 23 January 1991) was a Soviet bureaucrat and economist who was head of the Gosplan, or the State Planning Committee.

== Biography ==
He was born in Moscow to a working-class family. After graduating from the Moscow Communications Institute, he worked at the Scientific Research Institute of Radio of the Soviet Ministry of Communications as an engineer, leading designer, senior research fellow, and deputy director. At the institute, he headed the pioneering work on the creation of the world's first satellite television broadcasting system "Orbita" in the USSR, which was put into operation in 1967 and provided the opportunity to watch Soviet Central Television programs for almost 90 million citizens of the USSR living in Siberia and the Russian Far East. Under his leadership, the satellite systems "Moscow" and "Moscow-Global" were also introduced.

Talyzin was chosen by Mikhail Gorbachev in October 1985 to help start the program of economic change known as perestroika, after serving five years as the Soviet representative at Comecon, the Eastern European trade bloc. He was appointed head of the State Planning Commission, or Gosplan, when almost every sector of the Soviet economy was still firmly under state control. He became one of the three First Deputy Premiers at this time, as well as a non-voting member of the Communist Party Politburo.

The planning commission's task shifted from setting production targets to mapping out economic strategy, as Gorbachev pushed his economic reforms. Talyzin came under strong criticism, and moved to the post of head of the Bureau for Social Development in 1988, blamed for slowing reforms. In 1988, with perestroika failing to produce the promised results, he was dismissed, along with many other conservatives in Nikolai Ryzhkov's government, whom he blamed for slowing the pace of reforms.

== Awards and decorations ==
- Order of Lenin
- Order of the October Revolution
- Order of the Red Banner of Labour
- Order of the Red Star
- Laureate of the State Prize of the USSR, twice (1968, 1974)

Political offices
Preceded by Nikolai Baibakov	Chairman of the State Planning Committee; 1985–1988	Succeeded by Yuri Maslyukov
