= State Committee for Labour and Social Issues =

Goskomtrud (Russian: Госкомтруд) was the State Committee for Labour and Social Issues in the Soviet Union. It dealt with labour relations and wage issues. A 1991 western (American) review of the institution claimed over-emphasis on wage policy:

The problem in Goskomtrud's case is overcoming not so much its longstanding defense of traditional social policies, as its narrow preoccupation with wage policy to the virtual exclusion of everything else.

The Committee which formally belonged to the Council of Ministers was created in 1955 by decree of the Presidium of the Supreme Soviet on 24 May 1955. It was abolished in 1991, in the wake of the collapse of the Soviet Union. Throughout this time period, authorities had the name changed four times in the subsequent order:

The State Committee for Labour and Wages Issues of the Council of Ministers USSR (1955–1976) The State Committee for Labour and Social Issues of the Council of Ministers USSR (1976–1978) The State Committee of the USSR for Labour and Social Questions (1978-April 1991) The Ministry of Labour and Social Issues of the USSR (April 1991-November 1991)

Chairmen of Goskomtrud

- Lazar Kaganovich (1955–1956)
- A.P. Volkov (1955–1976)
- V.G. Lomonosov (1976–1983)
- Yu. P. Batalin (1983–1985)
- I.I. Glabkii (1986–1989)
- V.I. Scherbakov (1989–1991)

== See also ==
- Russia
- USSR
- Government of the Soviet Union
- Soviet Union
- Planned economy
