= Joseph Kuzmin =

Soviet politician (1910–1996)

Iosif Kuzmin
- Иосиф Кузьмин

Chairman of the State Planning Committee
- In office 10 May 1957 – 20 March 1959
- Premier: Nikita Khrushchev
- Preceded by: Nikolai Baibakov
- Succeeded by: Alexei Kosygin

First Deputy Chairman of the Council of Ministers of the Soviet Union
- In office 3 May 1957 – 31 March 1958
- Premier: Nikita Khrushchev
- Preceded by: Maksim Saburov
- Succeeded by: Frol Kozlov

Personal details
- Born: 19 May 1910 Astrakhan, Imperial Russia
- Died: 12 January 1996 (aged 85) Moscow, Russian Federation
- Party: Communist Party of the Soviet Union (1930–1961)

Iosif Iosifovich Kuzmin (Russian: Ио́сиф Ио́сифович Кузьми́н; 19 May [O.S. 1 June] 1910 – 12 January 1996) was a Soviet-Russian statesman who was First Deputy of the Council of Ministers of the Soviet Union from 1957 to 1958 and Chairman of the State Planning Committee from 1957 to 1959.

Kuzmin was awarded the Order of Lenin, Order of the Patriotic War, 1st class, Order of the Red Star and the Order of the Badge of Honour.
