= Pavlov's Government =

Pavlov's Government (Cabinet of the USSR)
- 28th Government of the Soviet Union
- Date formed: 14 January 1991
- Date dissolved: 28 August 1991

People and organisations
- Head of state: Mikhail Gorbachev
- Head of government: Valentin Pavlov

History
- Predecessor: Ryzhkov's Government
- Successor: Silayev's Government

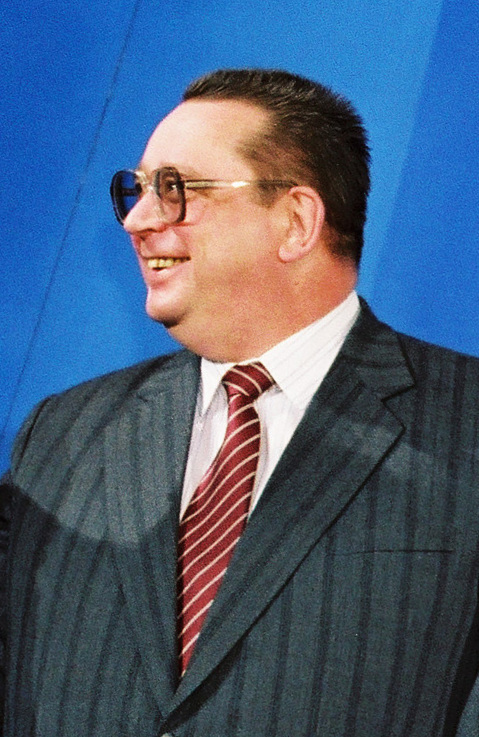
Valentin Pavlov, former Prime Minister of the Soviet Union

The Pavlov's Government (Russian: Правительство Павлова) was the last full-pledged and officially appointed government of the Soviet Union. As part of Gorbachev's restructuring reforms, "Perestroika", the government changed its name from the Council of Ministers to the Cabinet of Ministers.

The new Cabinet of Ministers was established on 26 December 1990, but the Law of the Soviet Union "About the Cabinet of Ministers of the Soviet Union" was adopted only on 20 March 1991. Appointments to ministerial positions were carried out by a presidential decree starting from 14 January 1991.

Following the dismissal of Pavlov's Government on 28 August 1991, all members remained in office as acting officials until 26 November 1991, except the Premier-minister, Deputy Prime Ministers (except the first ones), Minister of Foreign Affairs, Minister of Defense, Minister of Internal Affairs, and Chairman of the KGB.

== Composition ==
Ministry (Note: The list of ministries and other central bodies of state administration of the USSR was approved by the Law of the Soviet Union of April 1, 1991 No. 2073-I "On the list of ministries and other central bodies of state administration of the USSR")	Minister	Took office	Left office
Prime Minister of the Soviet Union	Valentin Pavlov	14 January 1991	28 August 1991
Prime Minister of the Soviet Union	Vitaly Doguzhiyev (acting)	19 August 1991	28 August 1991
First Deputy Prime Minister	Vladimir Velichko	15 January 1991	28 August 1991
First Deputy Prime Minister	Vitaly Doguzhiyev	15 January 1991	28 August 1991
First Deputy Prime Minister	Vladimir Scherbakov	16 May 1991	28 August 1991
Deputy Prime Minister	Nikolay Lavyorov	15 January 1991	28 August 1991
Deputy Prime Minister	Yuri Maslyukov	15 January 1991	28 August 1991
Deputy Prime Minister	Lev Ryabev	1 March 1991	28 August 1991
Deputy Prime Minister	Fyodor Senko	1 March 1991	28 August 1991
Deputy Prime Minister	Vladimir Scherbakov	1 March 1991	16 May 1991
Deputy Prime Minister	Bikhodzhal Rakhimova	16 May 1991	28 August 1991
Ministry of Aviation Industry	Appolon Systsov (acting)	–	–
Ministry of Automobile [Industrial] and Agricultural Machine-building [Engineering]	Nikolay Pugin	5 April 1991	28 August 1991
Ministry of Nuclear Power and Industry	Vitaliy Konovalov	1 March 1991	28 August 1991
Minister of Foreign Economic Relations	Konstantin Katushev (acting)	–	–
Ministry of Internal Affairs	Boris Pugo	15 January 1991	22 August 1991
Ministry of Internal Affairs	Vasiliy Trushin (acting)	22 August 1991	23 August 1991
Ministry of Geology	Grigoriy Gabrieliants	1 March 1991	28 August 1991
Ministry of Civil Aviation	Boris Panyukov	5 April 1991	28 August 1991
Ministry of Healthcare	Igor Denisov	9 April 1991	28 August 1991
Ministry of Foreign Affairs	Aleksandr Bessmertnykh	15 January 1991	28 August 1991
Ministry of Information and Press	Mikhail Nenashev	13 July 1991	28 August 1991
Ministry of Culture	Nikolai Gubenko	1 March 1991	28 August 1991
Ministry of Material Resources	Stanislav Anisimov	13 July 1991	28 August 1991
Ministry of Metallurgy	Oleg Soskovets	10 April 1991	28 August 1991
Ministry of Sea [Merchant] Fleet	Yuriy Volmer	13 July 1991	28 August 1991
Ministry of Oil and Gas Industry	Lev Churilov	22 June 1991	28 August 1991
Ministry of Defense Industry	Boris Belousov	5 April 1991	28 August 1991
Ministry of Defense	Dmitry Yazov	1 March 1991	28 August 1991
Ministry of Defense	Mikhail Moiseyev (acting)	22 August 1991	23 August 1991
Ministry of General Machine-Building [Engineering]	Oleg Shishkin	5 April 1991	28 August 1991
Ministry of Use of Nature and Environment Protection	Nikolay Vorontsov	1 March 1991	28 August 1991
Ministry of Communication Routes [Railways]	Leonid Matyukhin	8 May 1991	28 August 1991
Ministry of Radio Technology	Vladimir Shimko	2 March 1991	28 August 1991
Ministry of Fisheries	Nikolai Kotlyar	13 May 1991	28 August 1991
Ministry of Signal [Communications]	Gennadiy Kudryavtsev	2 March 1991	28 August 1991
Ministry of Agriculture and Food	Vyacheslav Chernoivanov	2 March 1991	28 August 1991
Ministry of Special Construction and Assembling Operations	Aleksandr Mikhalchenko	2 March 1991	28 August 1991
Ministry of Shipbuilding Industry	Igor Koksanov	2 March 1991	28 August 1991
Ministry of Trade	Kondrat Terekh	21 March 1991	28 August 1991
Ministry of Transport Construction	Vladimir Brezhnev	1 March 1991	28 August 1991
Ministry of Labor and Social Issues	Valeriy Paulman	26 March 1991	28 August 1991
Ministry of Coal Industry	Mikhail Shchadov	26 April 1991	28 August 1991
Ministry of Finance	Vladimir Orlov	26 March 1991	28 August 1991
Ministry of Chemical and Oil Refinery Industries	Salambek Khadzhiyev	9 April 1991	28 August 1991
Ministry of Economy and Forecasting	Vladimir Scherbakov	16 May 1991	28 August 1991
Ministry of the Electronics Industry	Vladislav Kolesnikov	7 March 1991	28 August 1991
Ministry of Electrical Industry and Instrument Engineering	Oleg Anfimov	9 April 1991	28 August 1991
Ministry of Energy and Electrification	Yuriy Semyonov	1 March 1991	28 August 1991
Ministry of Justice	Sergei Luschikov	2 March 1991	28 August 1991
Committee for State Security (KGB)	Vladimir Kryuchkov	1 April 1991	28 August 1991
Committee for State Security (KGB)	Leonid Shebarshin (acting)	22 August 1991	23 August 1991
State Committee for the Procurement of Food Resources	Mikhail Timoshishin	13 May 1991	28 August 1991
State Committee on Forests	Aleksandr Isayev	7 May 1991	28 August 1991
State Committee for Mechanical Engineering	Genrikh Stroganov	10 April 1991	28 August 1991
State Committee for Public Education	Gennady Yagodin (acting)	–	–
State Committee for Science and Technology	Nikolay Lavyorov	16 May 1991	28 August 1991
State Committee on National Issues	no appointment	–	–
State Committee on Statistics	Vadim Kirichenko	1 April 1991	28 August 1991
State Committee for Construction and Investments	Valeriy Serov	11 June 1991	28 August 1991
State Committee for Chemistry and Biotechnology	Vladimir Gusev	11 June 1991	28 August 1991
Managing the Cabinet of Ministers issues (in the status of Minister)	Igor Prostyakov	21 March 1991	28 August 1991

The heads of government of the Union republics could participate in the work of the Cabinet of Ministers with the right to vote.

== Notes ==
Government offices
Preceded by Ryzhkov	Governments of the Soviet Union; 14 January 1991 – 28 August 1991	Succeeded by —
