= Vladimir Shcherbakov =

Vladimir Shcherbakov may refer to:

- Vladimir Shcherbakov (footballer) (1945–1993), Soviet footballer
- Vladimir Shcherbakov (general) (1901–1981), Soviet general
- Vladimir Shcherbakov (politician) (1909–1985), Russian economist and politician
- Vladimir Shcherbakov (politician, born 1949) (born 1949), Soviet politician and statesman
- Vladimir Shcherbakov (politician, born 1941) (born 1941), Soviet politician and statesman
- Vladimir Shcherbakov (politician, born 1955) (born 1955), Russian politician and senator from Udmurtia
- Vladimir Shcherbakov (politician, 1924–1982) (1924–1982), Soviet politician and statesman

== See also ==
- Shcherbakov (disambiguation)
- Vladimir Shcherbachov (1889–1952), Soviet composer
