= Shcherban =

Shcherban (Cyrillic: Щерба́нь, Щерба́н) is an East Slavic surname of Ukrainian origin. Notable people with the surname include:

- Volodymyr Shcherban (born 1950), Ukrainian politician
- Yana Shcherban (born 1989), Russian volleyball player
- Yevhen Shcherban (1946–1996), Ukrainian businessman and politician

== See also ==
- Shcherba
- Shcherbak (surname)
- Shcherbakov (disambiguation)
- 4870 Shcherbanʹ, minor planet
