= Alexander Bessmertnykh =

Alexander Bessmertnykh may refer to:

- Alexander Bessmertnykh (politician) (born 1933), Soviet and Russian foreign minister and diplomat
- Alexander Bessmertnykh (skier) (born 1986), Russian cross-country skier
