= Vladimir Velichko =

- Владимир Величко

First Deputy Premier of the Soviet Union
- In office 15 January 1991 – 27 November 1991
- Premier: Valentin Pavlov; Ivan Silayev
- Preceded by: Vladilen Niktin
- Succeeded by: Vitaly Doguzhiev

Minister of Heavy Machine Building
- In office 17 July 1989 – 1 April 1991
- Premier: Nikolai Ryzhkov; Valentin Pavlov
- Preceded by: Konstantin Petukhov
- Succeeded by: Post abolished

Minister of Heavy, Power and Transport Machine Building
- In office 19 July 1987 – 27 June 1989
- Premier: Nikolai Ryzhkov
- Preceded by: Vladimir Zhigalin
- Succeeded by: Post abolished

Minister of Power Machine Building
- In office 8 December 1981 – 19 July 1987
- Premier: Nikolai Tikhonov; Nikolai Ryzhkov
- Preceded by: Viktor Krotov
- Succeeded by: Post abolished

Personal details
- Born: Vladimir Makarovich Velichko; 23 April 1937 (age 88) Mozhayskoye Novousmanskogo, Russian SFSR, Soviet Union
- Party: Communist Party of the Soviet Union (1963-1991)

Vladimir Makarovich Velichko (Russian: Владимир Макарович Величко; born 23 April 1937) is a Soviet official and entrepreneur appointed as the First Deputy Prime Minister of the Cabinet of Ministers in 1991.

== Life and career ==
Velichko was born into a working-class family in the village of Mozhayskoye Novousmanskogo in Voronezh Oblast, Russian Soviet Federative Socialist Republic, Soviet Union on 23 April 1937. According to United Russia's homepage, Velichko started his career in the Ukrainian Soviet Socialist Republic. He began studying at the Leningrad Military Mechanical Institute in 1955, graduating as a mechanical engineer in 1961.

=== Soviet politics ===
In 1963, Velichko joined the Communist Party of the Soviet Union (CPSU), and began work at a factory in Leningrad belonging to the Ministry of General Machine Building. He became Deputy Chief of the plant in 1965, and deputy director in 1971. Between 1973 and 1975, Velichko worked as the plant's manager and from 1985 to 1990, he served as a member of the CPSU Central Committee, later becoming a Deputy of the Supreme Soviet of the Soviet Union.

Velichko became First Deputy Minister of Power Machine Building in 1975, and continued to work in this post until 1981 when he became the Minister of Power Machine Building. On 20 July 1987, the Ministry of Power Machine Building merged with the Ministry of Heavy and Transport Machine Building to become the Ministry of Heavy, Power and Transport Machine Building with Velichko becoming the Minister of Heavy, Power and Transport Machine Building. The Ministry of Heavy, Power and Transport Machine Building then merged with the Ministry of Construction, Road and Municipal Machine Building on 27 June 1989 to become the Ministry of Heavy Machine Building. He was elected Minister of Heavy Machine Building by the Supreme Soviet of the Soviet Union with only five abstentions or votes against him among about 400 delegates. He was a member of the Presidium of the Council of Ministers during the premiership of Nikolai Ryzhkov, and later became a First Deputy Prime Minister of the Cabinet of Ministers during Valentin Pavlov's Prime Ministership.

=== Entrepreneurship ===
Since November 1990, Velichko has been chairman of the board joint-stock company Tyazhenergomash, and since 1996 worked as chairman of the Board of Directors of Tyazhenergomash, a financial-industrial group. As chairman of Velichko Tyazhenergomash he has overseen the reconstruction of several Soviet era plants as well as construction of new gas power stations with a generating capacity of more than 100 Megawatt. Velichko was also active in the construction of the Novo-Voronezh, Ignalina and Balakovo nuclear power plants along with several others in the Commonwealth of Independent States (CIS).

Velichko has been a member of the Council on Industrial Policy of the Russian Government since 1993, and became Chairman of the Council for Industrial Policy and Entrepreneurship of the Russian Government in 1994, an office he has held ever since. In 1994, he became chairman of the Board of Directors of Holdingtembanka. Since 1993, Velichko has been General Director of TENMA, and since 1996 the President of FPG. As of 2011 Velichko is a member of the Presidium of the Russian Academy of Engineering.

== Recognition ==
In recognition of his work in developing Soviet industry during his tenure as minister of several ministries in the 1980s, Velichko was awarded two Orders of Lenin, Order of the October Revolution, two USSR State Prizes (1976 and 1978), Order of the Red Banner of Labour and Order of Friendship of the Czechoslovak Socialist Republic, as well as several other decorations, awards and medals. Velichko also received the Order "For Merit to the Fatherland", 4th class.
