= Premier of the Soviet Union =

Head of government of the USSR

- Глава Правительства СССР (Russian)
- State Emblem of the Soviet Union

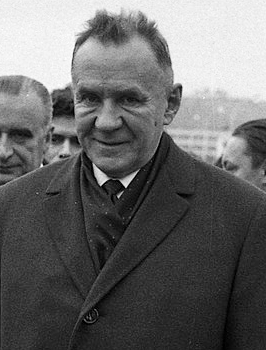
- Longest serving Alexei Kosygin; 15 October 1964 – 23 October 1980
- Style: Mr. Premier (informal); His Excellency (diplomatic)
- Type: Head of government
- Reports to: Supreme Soviet
- Residence: Kremlin Senate, Moscow
- Appointer: Supreme Soviet
- Formation: 6 July 1923; 103 years ago
- First holder: Vladimir Lenin
- Final holder: Ivan Silayev
- Abolished: 26 December 1991; 34 years ago
- Succession: Prime Minister of Russia
- Deputy: First Deputy Premier; Deputy Premier

The premier of the Soviet Union (Russian: Глава Правительства СССР) was the head of government of the Union of Soviet Socialist Republics (USSR). From 1923 to 1946, the name of the office was chairman of the Council of People's Commissars, and from 1946 to 1991 its name was chairman of the Council of Ministers. During the dissolution of the Soviet Union in 1991, its name was briefly prime minister and later chairman of the Committee on the Operational Management of the Soviet Economy. The first Soviet premier was the country's founder and first leader, Vladimir Lenin. After General Secretary of the Communist Party Joseph Stalin rose to power in 1924, the de facto leader of the Soviet Union typically was the party's general secretary, with Stalin and his successor Nikita Khrushchev also serving as premier. Twelve individuals held the post.

== History ==
Lenin's First Government was created on 6 July 1923 by the Central Executive Committee with Lenin as its first chairman. The government was empowered to initiate decrees and legislation that were binding throughout the USSR. The longest serving premier in the history of the USSR was Alexei Kosygin, who was appointed head of government after the ousting of Nikita Khrushchev in 1964. However, Kosygin's prestige was weakened when he proposed the economic reform of 1965. In 1991, upon Valentin Pavlov's ascension to the premiership, the Council of Ministers was abolished and replaced with the Cabinet of Ministers. After the August coup of 1991, the majority of the cabinet members endorsed the coup, leading to the Cabinet of Ministers dissolving and being replaced by the Committee on the Operational Management of the Soviet Economy. The government of the Russian Soviet Federative Socialist Republic began seizing Soviet ministries in the aftermath of the coup, and by December 1991 the Soviet government had completely lost control of itself and shut down entirely.

Under the 1977 Soviet Constitution, the head of government was the leader of the highest executive and administrative organ of state. The head of government was appointed by and accountable to the Supreme Soviet (and its Presidium). The head of government was tasked with resolving all state administrative duties within the jurisdiction of the USSR to the degree which were not the responsibility of the Supreme Soviet or its Presidium. The head of government managed the national economy, formulated the five-year plans and ensured socio-cultural development. It functioned as the most influential office of government and nominally the most influential office until the establishment of the Office of the President of the Soviet Union in 1990.

Vladimir Lenin died in office of natural causes, as well as Joseph Stalin, and three premiers resigned—Alexei Kosygin, Nikolai Tikhonov and Ivan Silayev. Another three were concurrently party leader and head of government (Lenin, Stalin and Nikita Khrushchev). The one who spent the shortest time in office was Ivan Silayev, at 119 days. Kosygin spent the longest time in office—16 years.

== List of officeholders ==
No. (Note: These numbers are not official.)	Portrait	Name (Birth–Death)	Term			Electorate	Cabinets	Ref.
No.	Portrait	Name (Birth–Death)	Took office	Left office	Duration	Electorate	Cabinets	Ref.
1	Vladimir Lenin	Vladimir Lenin (1870–1924)	6 July 1923	21 January 1924 †	199 days	—	Lenin I–II	
2	Alexei Rykov	Alexei Rykov (1881–1938)	2 February 1924	19 December 1930	6 years, 320 days	1924; 1925; 1927; 1929	Rykov I–II–III–IV–V	
3	Vyacheslav Molotov	Vyacheslav Molotov (1890–1986)	19 December 1930	6 May 1941	10 years, 138 days	1931; 1935; 1936; 1937	Molotov I–II–III–IV	
4	Joseph Stalin	Joseph Stalin (1878–1953)	6 May 1941	5 March 1953 †	11 years, 303 days	1946; 1950	Stalin I–II–III	
5	Georgy Malenkov	Georgy Malenkov (1902–1988)	5 March 1953	8 February 1955	1 year, 340 days	1954	Malenkov I–II	
6	Nikolai Bulganin	Nikolai Bulganin (1895–1975)	8 February 1955	27 March 1958	3 years, 47 days	1958	Bulganin	
7	Nikita Khrushchev	Nikita Khrushchev (1894–1971)	27 March 1958	15 October 1964	6 years, 202 days	1962	Khrushchev I–II	
8	Alexei Kosygin	Alexei Kosygin (1904–1980)	15 October 1964	23 October 1980	16 years, 8 days	1966; 1970; 1974; 1979	Kosygin I–II–III–IV–V	
9	Nikolai Tikhonov	Nikolai Tikhonov (1905–1997)	23 October 1980	27 September 1985	4 years, 339 days	1984	Tikhonov I–II	
10	Nikolai Ryzhkov	Nikolai Ryzhkov (1929–2024)	27 September 1985	14 January 1991	5 years, 109 days	1989	Ryzhkov I–II	
11	Valentin Pavlov	Valentin Pavlov (1937–2003)	14 January 1991	28 August 1991 (Note: On August 19, 1991, due to the illness of Valentin Pavlov, the duties of the head of the government of the USSR were assigned to First Deputy Prime Minister Vitaly Doguzhiyev.)	226 days	—	Pavlov I	
12	Ivan Silayev	Ivan Silayev (1930–2023)	28 August 1991	25 December 1991	119 days	—	Silayev I	

== See also ==
- Bibliography of the Russian Revolution and Civil War § Government
- Bibliography of Stalinism and the Soviet Union § Government
- Bibliography of the Post Stalinist Soviet Union § Government
- Deputy Premier of the Soviet Union
- First Deputy Premier of the Soviet Union
- List of heads of state of the Soviet Union
- List of leaders of the Soviet Union
