= List of international presidential trips made by Armen Sarkissian =

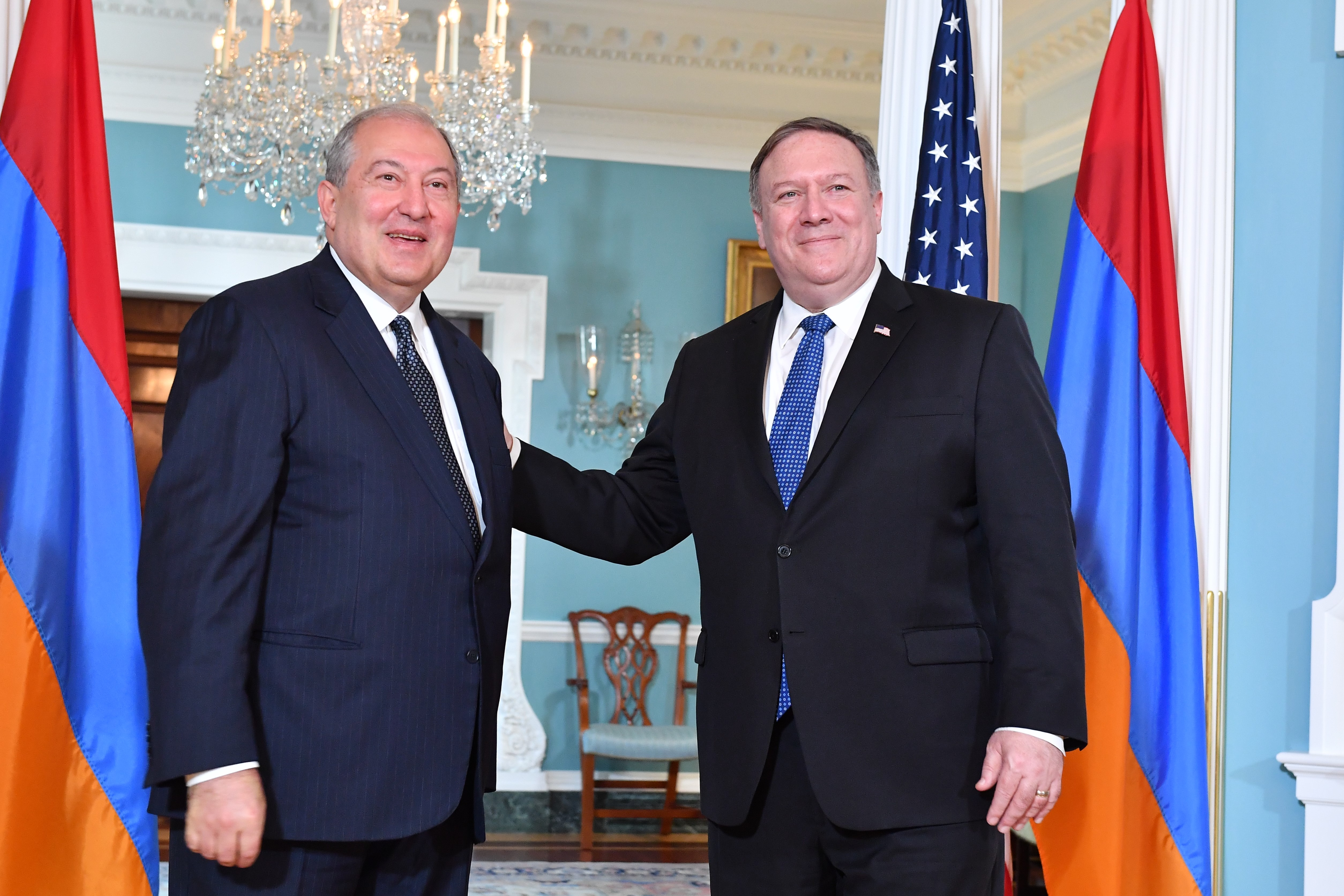
Sarkissian with Mike Pompeo in June 2018.

Below is a list of international presidential trips made by Armen Sarkissian as the 4th President of Armenia.

== List ==
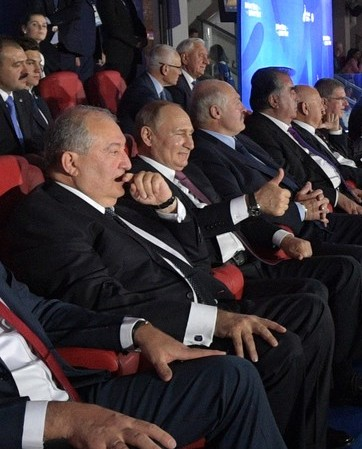
Sarkissian with Vladimir Putin and Alexander Lukashenko at the closing ceremony of the 2019 European Games in Minsk.

Country	City	Dates	Host	Notes	Type of Visit
Georgia	Tbilisi	25–26 May 2018	President Giorgi Margvelashvili	He attended celebrations in honor of the 100th anniversary of Georgian Independence. He held a bilateral meeting with Giorgi Margvelashvili, Bidzina Ivanishvili and Finnish President Sauli Niinistö.	Working visit
United Kingdom	London	18–22 June 2018	Marshal of the Diplomatic Corps Alistair Harrison	Held bilateral meetings at Buckingham Palace.	Working visit
France	Paris	23–26 June 2018	Secretary General Michaëlle Jean	Held meetings with French business representatives. Met with the Secretary General of the Organisation internationale de la Francophonie, Michaëlle Jean.	Working visit
United States	Washington	26–29 June 2018	Secretary Mike Pompeo	Attended a reception in honor of the 100th anniversary of Armenian Independence. Participated in the Folklife Festival.	Working visit
France	Chamonix	22–23 September 2018	Unknown	Participated in the Summit of Mind.	Working visit
United States	New York City	3–5 October	Unknown	Met with Henry Kissinger.	Working visit
France	Paris	5 October 2018	President Emmanuel Macron	Attended the funeral of Charles Aznavour.	Working visit
Switzerland	Geneva	23–25 October 2018	President Alain Berset	Participated at the official opening of the World Investment Forum.	Working visit
Belarus	Minsk	29 October - 1 November 2018	President Alexander Lukashenko	Met with the Main Group of the Munich Security Conference.	Working visit
France	Paris	12–13 September 2018	Unknown	Met with the Managing Partner of the annual Summit of Minds in Chamonix.	Working visit
Italy	Rome	14–17 November 2018	President Sergio Mattarella	Discussed issues related to the strengthening of the Armenian-Italian relations with President Mattarella.	Working visit
Germany	Berlin	27–30 November 2018	President Frank-Walter Steinmeier	Main article: Foreign relations of Armenia	State visit
Georgia	Telavi, Tbilisi	16 December 2018	President Salome Zurabishvili	He attended the inauguration of Salome Zurabishvili.	Working visit
UAE	Abu Dhabi	14 January 2019	Crown Prince Mohammed bin Zayed al-Nahyan	Participated in the Abu Dhabi Sustainable Week International Forum.	Official visit
France	Paris	6–9 February 2019	Christian Nardin	Met with French entrepreneurs. Attended a session of the Armenian General Benevolent Union.	Working Visit
Germany	Munich	18 February 2019	Chancellor Angela Merkel	Attended the Munich Security Conference. Visited Munich Technical University.	Working Visit
Jordan	Amman	5–7 April 2019	King Abdullah II bin Al-Hussein	Attended the World Economic Forum.	Working Visit
Portugal	Lisbon	7–9 April 2019	President Marcelo Rebelo de Sousa	Main article: Foreign relations of Armenia	Working Visit
Kazakhstan	Nur-Sultan	17 May 2019	President Kassym-Jomart Tokayev	Main article: Astana Economic Forum	Working Visit
Switzerland	Geneva	27 June 2019	President Ueli Maurer	Participated in the Crans Montana Forum.	Working visit
Belarus	Minsk	30 June	President Alexander Lukashenko	Attended the closing ceremony of the 2019 European Games.	Working visit
France	Paris	24 July 2019	Unknown		Working visit
Spain	Tenerife	13 August 2019	Unknown	Visited the Teide Observatory.	Working visit
Italy	Rome	23 September 2019	Unknown		Working visit
Serbia	Belgrade	4 October 2019	President Aleksandar Vucic		State visit
Switzerland	Geneva	5–6 October 2019	President Ueli Maurer	Participated in the Summit of Minds.	Working visit
Japan	Tokyo	22 October 2019	Emperor Naruhito	Main article: Enthronement of the Japanese emperor	Working visit
Qatar	Doha	17–19 November 2019	Emir Tamim bin Hamad Al Thani		State visit
United Kingdom	London	22 November 2019	Unknown		Working visit
UAE	Abu Dhabi	29 November 2019	Crown Prince Mohammed bin Zayed al-Nahyan		Working visit
UAE	Abu Dhabi	11–16 January 2020	Crown Prince Mohammed bin Zayed al-Nahyan	Participated in the Abu Dhabi Sustainable Week International Forum.	Working visit
Switzerland	Davos	20–23 January 2020	President Simonetta Sommaruga		Working visit
Israel	Jerusalem	23 January 2020	President Reuven Rivlin	Attended the World Holocaust Forum.	Working visit
Belgium	Brussels	21 October 2020	NATO Secretary General Jens Stoltenberg and European Council President Charles Michel		Working visit
France	Paris	22 October 2020	President Emmanuel Macron		Working visit
UAE	Abu Dhabi	15 November 2020	Crown Prince Mohammed bin Zayed al-Nahyan		Official visit
Jordan	Amman	23 November 2020	King Abdullah II bin Al-Hussein		Official Visit
Russia	Moscow	28 November 2020	Armenian diaspora in Moscow	He continued discussions with Armenian communities and met with representatives of the Armenian community.	Private visit
Georgia	Tbilisi	15 April 2021	President Salome Zurabishvili		Working visit
Russia	Moscow	8-10 May 2021	Viktor Sadovnichiy	Visited Moscow State University	Private/working visit
Kazakhstan	Nur-Sultan	3 June 2021	President Kassym-Jomart Tokayev		Working Visit
Qatar	Doha	20 July 2021	Emir Tamim bin Hamad Al Thani		Private visit
Japan	Tokyo	20–28 July 2021	Emperor Naruhito	Attended the 2020 Summer Olympics opening ceremony and the 2020 Summer Olympics	Working Visit
