= Shcherbakov =

Shcherbakov or Scherbakov (Russian: Щербако́в), feminine: Shcherbakova or Scherbakova (Щербако́ва), is a Russian surname. It may refer to:

== Surname ==
- Albert Shcherbakov (born 1976), Russian footballer
- Aleksandr Shcherbakov (born 1998), Russian footballer
- Aleksandr Shcherbakov (21st-century politician)
- Aleksandr Scherbakov (pilot) (1925–2013), Soviet aircraft pilot and Hero of the Soviet Union
- Aleksandr Shcherbakov (1901–1945), Soviet statesman and politician
- Alexander Shcherbakov (diplomat) (born 1955), Russian diplomat
- Andrey Shcharbakow (known in Russian as Andrey Scherbakov) (born 1991), Belarusian footballer
- Anna Shcherbakova (born 2004), Russian figure skater
- Boris Shcherbakov (born 1949), Russian actor
- Denis Scherbakov (born 1978), Belarusian football referee
- Denys Shcherbakov (born 1988), Ukrainian orienteer
- Fedor Shcherbakov (1947–2022), Russian-Kazakh Lieutenant General
- Ihor Shcherbakov (born 1955), Ukrainian composer
- Konstantin Scherbakov (born 1963), Russian pianist
- Konstantin Shcherbakov (born 1997), Russian footballer
- Leonid Shcherbakov (1927–2004), Soviet athlete
- Leonid Ivanovich Shcherbakov (1936–2021), Soviet general and Hero of the Russian Federation
- Mikhail Shcherbakov (born 1963), Russian singer-songwriter
- Oleg Shcherbakov (born 1966), Russian footballer
- Oleksandr Shcherbakov (born 1960), Ukrainian footballer
- Pyotr Shcherbakov (1929–1992), Soviet actor
- Ruslan Shcherbakov (born 1969), Russian chess player
- Salavat Shcherbakov (born 1955), Soviet sculptor
- Sergei Scherbakov (1918–1994), Russian boxer
- Sergey Shcherbakov (1962–1988), Soviet serial killer
- Serhiy Scherbakov (born 1971), Ukrainian footballer
- Svetlana Shcherbakova (born 1988), Russian weightlifter
- Vadim Shcherbakov (fl. 1966–1991), Soviet military advisor to North Vietnam
- Vasily Shcherbakov (born 1969), Russian musician and professor, grand-nephew of the composer Dmitry Kabalevsky
- Vladimir A Scherbakov (1961–2017), oligarch, USSR first deputy prime minister, head of Gosplan
- Vladimir Shcherbakov (1945–1993), Soviet footballer
- Vladimir Shcherbakov (1901–1981), Soviet general
- Vladimir Shcherbakov (1909–1985), Soviet scientist and politician
- Yury Shcherbakov (1925-?), Soviet javelin thrower
- Yevgeni Shcherbakov (born 1986), Russian footballer

== Other ==
- Name of Rybinsk, Russia from 1946 to 1957
- Shcherbakov Range, a mountain range in Antarctica
- Shcherbakov Shche-2, a World War II era Soviet utility aircraft
- Shcherbakov, 13th of the Sverdlov-class cruisers, launched 1954, scrapped 1961

== See also ==
- Shcherba
- Shcherbak
- Shcherbachov
