= Alexander Bessmertnykh (politician) =

Russian diplomat (born 1933)

- Александр Бессмертных
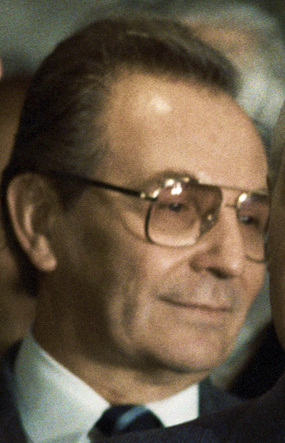
- Bessmertnykh in 1989

Minister of Foreign Affairs of the Soviet Union
- In office 15 January – 28 August 1991
- Premier: Valentin Pavlov; Vitaly Doguzhiyev
- Preceded by: Eduard Shevardnadze
- Succeeded by: Boris Pankin (acting)

Personal details
- Born: 10 November 1933 (age 92) Biysk, Russian SFSR, Soviet Union
- Party: Communist Party of the Soviet Union (1957–1991)
- Spouse: Marina Vladimirovna
- Children: 2
- Education: Moscow State University
- Profession: Politics

Alexander Alexandrovich Bessmertnykh (Russian: Алекса́ндр Алекса́ндрович Бессме́ртных; born 10 November 1933) is a Soviet diplomat who briefly served as foreign minister of the Soviet Union.

== Early life ==
Bessmertnykh was born in Biysk in 1933, first of four children. He lost his father when he was 10 years old.

== Career ==
Bessmertnykh joined the ministry of foreign affairs in 1957. From 1970 to 1983 he served as a consul at the Soviet embassy in the United States, and then headed the US department in the foreign ministry. In 1986, he was appointed deputy foreign minister and in 1988, he became first deputy foreign minister. From 1990 to 1991, he was ambassador to the United States.

=== Soviet Foreign Minister ===
He briefly served as a Minister of Foreign Affairs of the USSR in 1991, replacing Eduard Shevardnadze, being approved by the Supreme Soviet of the Soviet Union on 15 January 1991. During the August coup of 1991, he did not lend his support to the attempt at removing Gorbachev from power, but refused to condemn the plotters. For supporting the GKChP, the government of Valentin Pavlov was dismissed and, accordingly, Bessmertnykh lost the role.

Political offices
| Preceded by Eduard Shevardnadze | Foreign Minister of the Soviet Union; 1991 | Succeeded by Boris Pankin (acting) |
