= Ministry of Foreign Affairs (Soviet Union) =

Government ministry of the Soviet Union

Ministry of External Relations of the USSR
- Министерство иностранных дел СССР
- All ministry seals of the Soviet Union used the Soviet coat of arms

Agency overview
- Formed: 6 July 1923
- Dissolved: 26 December 1991
- Superseding agency: Ministry of Foreign Affairs of the Russian Federation (1992)
- Jurisdiction: Government of the Soviet Union
- Headquarters: 32/34 Smolenskaya-Sennaya Square; Moscow, Russian SFSR, Soviet Union

The Ministry of Foreign Affairs of the Union of Soviet Socialist Republics (Russian: Министерство иностранных дел СССР) was founded on 6 July 1923. It had three names during its existence: People's Commissariat for Foreign Affairs (1923–1946), Ministry of Foreign Affairs (1946–1991) and Ministry of External Relations (1991). It was one of the most important government offices in the Soviet Union. The Ministry was led by the Minister of Foreign Affairs prior to 1991, and a Minister of External Relations in 1991. Every leader of the Ministry was nominated by the Chairman of the Council of Ministers and confirmed by the Presidium of the Supreme Soviet, and was a member of the Council of Ministers.

The Ministry of External Relations negotiated diplomatic treaties, handled Soviet foreign affairs along with the International Department of the Communist Party of the Soviet Union (CPSU) and aided in the guidance of world communism and anti-imperialism, both strong themes of Soviet policy. Before Mikhail Gorbachev became CPSU General Secretary, the organisational structure of the MER mostly stayed the same. As many other Soviet agencies, the MER had an inner-policy group known as the Collegium, made up of the minister, the two first deputy ministers and nine deputy ministers, among others. Each deputy minister usually headed his own department.

== Duties and responsibilities ==
The primary duty of the foreign ministry was directing the general line of Soviet foreign policy. The MER represented the country abroad and participated in talks with foreign delegations on behalf of the Soviet government. It also appointed diplomatic officers, with the exception of Soviet ambassadors, who were appointed by the Council of Ministers. The MER was responsible for taking care of the USSR's economic and political interests abroad, although economic interests were also the joint responsibility of the Ministry of Foreign Trade. The State Committee of the Council of Ministers on Cultural Links with Foreign Nations and the Ministry of Culture worked jointly with the MER in regards to the protection of Soviet citizens abroad, the exercise of overall Soviet consular relations abroad and the promotion of Soviet culture abroad. A less visible duty of the MER was its role in the coordination of Soviet intelligence operations abroad.

Exit visas were issued by the federal MER, but also by its all-union foreign affairs ministries and by the Ministry of Internal Affairs. The same was true for the civilian external passports that were issued to Soviet citizens.

== Organisation and structure ==
The inner policy making group of the ministry was the Collegium. The members of the Collegium were usually the minister, the two first deputy ministers, the nine deputy ministers, a chief of the general secretariat and fourteen other members. In total there were 27 members of the Collegium in 1990. Each deputy minister was responsible for a department. The remaining members controlled either a department or an administrative body of the ministry. A Collegium in the USSR was, in many ways, the same as collective leadership. The Collegium coordinated decision making regarding the allocation of specific tasks on the basis of the MER's policy. This body was expected to review new directives ordered by the minister and note their successes and failures. Mikhail Gorbachev's "new political thinking" was made official in the Collegium in 1988, such as by setting goals for improving diplomatic relations and creating "decent, human, material and spiritual living conditions for all nations". Furthermore, the Collegium noted that the improvements in international efforts "to save the world" was the best "class notion of socialism." It believed that if socialism could create a more peaceful world, socialism would truly have carried out a "world revolution."

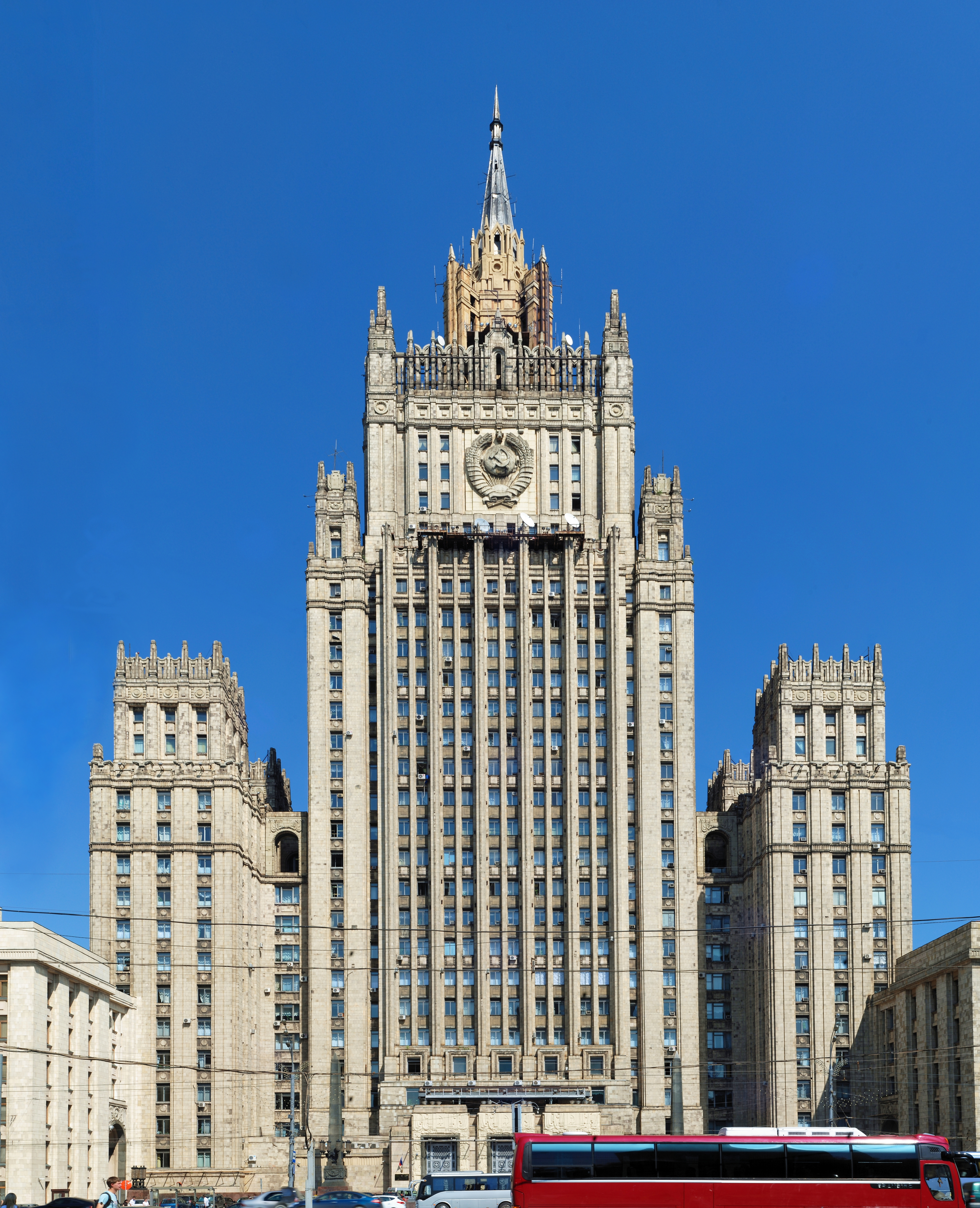
Ministry of Foreign Affairs headquarters, completed in 1953

The federal Ministry of External Relations and its local all-union affiliates would regularly convene at the federal Council of Ministers and its Union Republics branches to discuss the policy, duties and responsibilities of the MER. This joint gathering led to more participation from the union republics on foreign policy implementation, elaboration and coordination. This organ also discussed international problems and solved such problems in the international arena.

Because the communist regimes of Eastern Europe collapsed in 1989, there was no longer any distinction between the Eastern and Western European departments. A separate administration body known as "embassy affairs" existed for servicing the Soviet diplomatic corps abroad. In 1986, the Soviet government created new MER departments to deal with arms control and disarmament. The MER also created new regional departments, such as the Department of the Pacific. This was a radical change, since the MER's structure had mostly remained unchanged since the Russian Empire. A Soviet textbook describes MER's organisation and structure as follows:

An important branch of the central apparatus, from the point of view of day-to-day operational diplomatic guidance, is the executive diplomatic division. The nature of activities engaged in by these divisions is determined by their territorial and functional characteristics. Territorial departments handle questions of foreign relations with specific groups of states. These groups of countries are divided by regions.

The reorganisation efforts that took place in 1986 and the beginning of 1987 led to the replacement of many senior diplomats. The government also introduced a new principle which stated, "Once an ambassador has been at the same post for 4 or 5 years, he loses the edge of his perceptiveness. The optimum period of service in one and the same post is three years as a maximum."

== Ideology and policy-making ==
Ideology was a key component of Soviet foreign policy. Soviet diplomacy was built on the ideas of Marxism-Leninism; Vladimir Lenin understood that compromise is an important element in foreign diplomacy and was a proponent of peaceful coexistence with the capitalist powers. A primary goal of the emphasis placed on coexistence and compromise was to “prevent the imperialist states from attacking the USSR while it was restoring the Russian economy following the Civil War and, later, while it was undertaking industrial development. Therefore, "certain agreements with the imperialist countries in the interest of socialism" could sometimes be reached. The relationship between policy and ideology remained an active issue until the dissolution of the Soviet Union. According to an unknown former director of the Moscow State Institute of International Relations, all successful diplomatic activities by the Soviet side were based on the principles of Marxism-Leninism and the Soviet evaluation of other countries in certain fields, such as social development. The Directorate for Planning Foreign Policy Measures, an organ of the MER, analysed international relations and tried to predict future events, although it never actually planned the policy of the MER. Soviet foreign affairs minister Eduard Shevardnadze claimed that Soviet foreign policy, and the "new thinking" approach laid out by Gorbachev, had become the cornerstone of maintaining stable diplomatic relations throughout the world.

There are many examples of rivalry between party and state in Soviet history. In foreign policy the state was represented by the MER, while the International Department (ID) represented the party. The ID's foreign policy approach was more ideological than the MER's, which followed a policy of détente, literally meaning the easing of strained relations with the First World. Historian Jan Adams explained the conflict in the following manner:

"Deeply embedded and seemingly inescapable conflict between these two major Soviet foreign policy institutions and their missions. On the other hand, the Ministry of Foreign Affairs seeks to cultivate formal state to state relationships; on the other hand the ID pursues the party's dream of building a communist world at the expense of capitalism."

The MER used much more of its human and financial resources for propaganda purposes and so-called "active measures" than other non-Soviet affiliated foreign ministries. This included dissemination of views supported by the Soviet government, harassment, censorship, radio jamming, forgeries and general disinformation. Disinformation had become an important component of day-to-day operations in Soviet foreign affairs. Because of this, during most of its lifespan the Soviet MER had a much higher budget than its counterpart non-Soviet ministries, especially when comparing the MER to the foreign ministries of the Western Bloc. Shevardnadze claimed that the Soviet government used an estimate of 700 billion rubles alone on the Ministry of Foreign Affairs (known as such until 1991) to support "ideological confrontations" with the First World.

== History ==
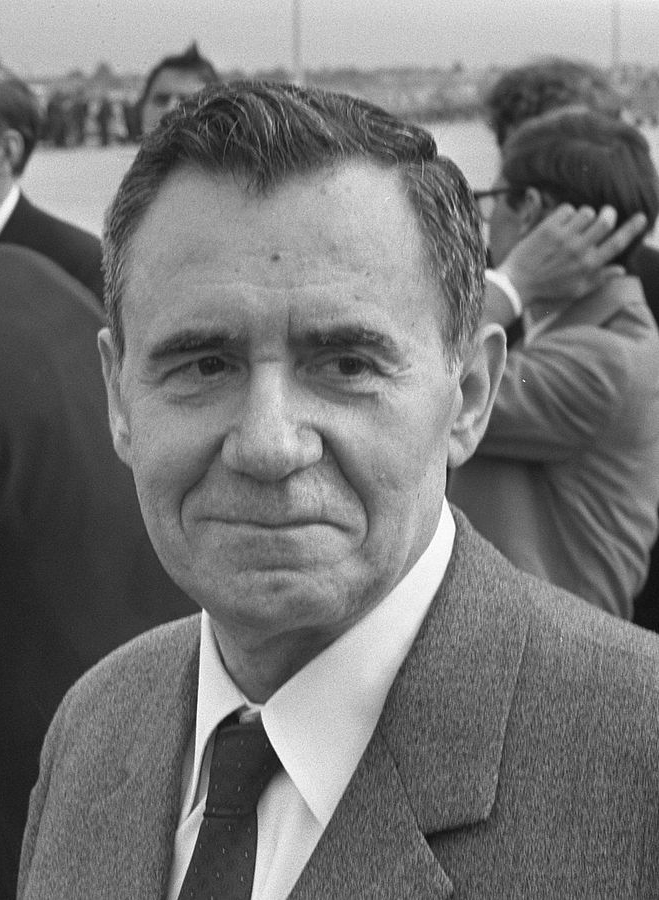
Andrei Gromyko was the longest-serving Minister of Foreign Affairs in the USSR.

The People's Commissariat for Foreign Affairs of the Russian Soviet Federative Socialist Republic (RSFSR) was established in 1917. The Commissar was a member of the Council of the People's Commissars. The People's Commissariat for Foreign Affairs replaced the Ministry of Foreign Affairs of the Russian Empire after the October Revolution. In 1946 the Council of People's Commissars was renamed the Council of Ministers and the People's Commissariat for Foreign Affairs was renamed the Ministry of Foreign Affairs.

As Soviet foreign minister, Andrei Gromyko noted in his memoirs that working with Nikita Khrushchev was not always an easy task. As Gromyko tells it, "Khrushchev would constantly throw new ideas back and forth." His ideas were not always supported, but, as Gromyko noted, Khrushchev had a positive impact on Soviet foreign policy. Leonid Brezhnev, according to Gromyko, was a man much easier to do business with because he compensated for his lack of skills by discussing subjects openly within the Politburo. While he was easier to do business with in some areas, Brezhnev's slowness and lack of knowledge in certain fields made him hard to discuss foreign policy with. However, Gromyko noted that his disease should be taken in consideration. Mikhail Gorbachev's "new thinking" led to friendlier foreign relations with the Western countries, but his domestic policies destabilised the country, and in 1991 the Soviet Union dissolved. In 1991, before the country's dissolution, the Ministry was renamed the Ministry of External Relations USSR. The ministry was succeeded by the Ministry of Foreign Affairs of the Russian Federation in 1992 after Russia declared itself the legal successor to the USSR.

== List of commissars and ministers ==
The following persons headed the Commissariat/Ministry as commissars (narkoms) during the Soviet era:

No.	Portrait	Name (Birth–Death)	Term			Cabinet
No.	Portrait	Name (Birth–Death)	Took office	Left office	Duration	Cabinet
People's Commissar for Foreign Affairs of the USSR
1	Georgy Chicherin	Georgy Chicherin (1872–1936)	6 July 1923	21 July 1930	7 years, 15 days	Lenin II; Rykov I–II–III–IV–V
2	Maxim Litvinov	Maxim Litvinov (1876–1951)	21 July 1930	3 May 1939	8 years, 286 days	Molotov I–II–III–IV
3	Vyacheslav Molotov	Vyacheslav Molotov (1890–1986)	3 May 1939	15 March 1946	6 years, 305 days	Molotov IV; Stalin I–II
Minister of Foreign Affairs of the USSR
3	Vyacheslav Molotov	Vyacheslav Molotov (1890–1986)	19 March 1946	4 March 1949	2 years, 350 days	Stalin II
4	Andrey Vyshinsky	Andrey Vyshinsky (1883–1954)	4 March 1949	5 March 1953	4 years, 1 day	Stalin II
(3)	Vyacheslav Molotov	Vyacheslav Molotov (1890–1986)	5 March 1953	1 June 1956	3 years, 88 days	Malenkov I–II; Bulganin
5	Dmitri Shepilov	Dmitri Shepilov (1905–1995)	1 June 1956	15 February 1957	259 days	Bulganin; Khrushchev I
6	Andrei Gromyko	Andrei Gromyko (1909–1989)	15 February 1957	2 July 1985	28 years, 137 days	Khrushchev I–II; Kosygin I–II–III–IV–V; Tikhonov I–II
7	Eduard Shevardnadze	Eduard Shevardnadze (1928–2014)	2 July 1985	15 January 1991	5 years, 197 days	Tikhonov II; Ryzhkov I–II
8	Alexander Bessmertnykh	Alexander Bessmertnykh (born 1933)	15 January 1991	28 August 1991	225 days	Pavlov
–	Boris Pankin	Boris Pankin (born 1931); Acting	28 August 1991	18 November 1991	82 days	Silayev
Minister of External Relations of the USSR
(7)	Eduard Shevardnadze	Eduard Shevardnadze (1928–2014)	19 November 1991	26 December 1991	37 days	Silayev

== List of first deputy ministers ==
There are ten individuals are elected as the First Deputy Minister, Vasily Kuznetsov spent the longest time in office (22 years). Vladimir Petrovsky spent the shortest time in office (96 days).

No.	Portrait	Name (Birth–Death)	Term			Cabinet
No.	Portrait	Name (Birth–Death)	Took office	Left office	Duration	Cabinet
First Deputy Minister of Foreign Affairs of the Soviet Union (1953–1991)
1	Andrei Gromyko	Andrei Gromyko (1909–1989)	20 July 1953	15 February 1957	3 years, 210 days	Malenkov I–II; Bulganin; Khrushchev I
2	Vasily Kuznetsov	Vasily Kuznetsov (1901–1990)	15 February 1955	7 October 1977	22 years, 234 days	Khrushchev I–II; Kosygin I–II–III–IV
3	Nikolai Patolichev	Nikolai Patolichev (1908–1989)	18 March 1957	7 January 1958	295 days	Bulganin I
4	Georgy Korniyenko	Georgy Korniyenko (1925–2006)	7 October 1977	27 April 1986	8 years, 202 days	Kosygin IV; Tikhonov I–II; Ryzhkov I
5	Viktor Maltsev [ru]	Viktor Maltsev (1917–2003)	24 December 1977	27 May 1986	8 years, 154 days	Kosygin IV; Tikhonov I–II; Ryzhkov I
6	Anatoly Kovalyov [ru]	Anatoly Kovalyov (1923–2002)	27 May 1986	26 December 1991	5 years, 213 days	Ryzhkov I–II; Pavlov; Silayev
7	Yuli Vorontsov	Yuli Vorontsov (1929–2007)	27 May 1986	24 February 1990	3 years, 273 days	Ryzhkov I–Ryzhkov II
8	Alexander Bessmertnykh	Alexander Bessmertnykh (born 1933)	8 July 1988	25 April 1990	1 year, 291 days	Ryzhkov I–Ryzhkov II
9	Yuli Kvitsinsky [ru]	Yuli Kvitsinsky (1936–2010)	12 May 1991	21 September 1991	132 days	Pavlov; Silayev
10	Vladimir Petrovsky	Vladimir Petrovsky (1933–2014)	21 September 1991	26 December 1991	96 days	Silayev

== See also ==
- Ministries of the Soviet Union
- Minister of Foreign Affairs (Russia)
- Foreign relations of the Soviet Union
