= Boris Pankin =

Soviet diplomat (born 1931)

- Борис Панкин
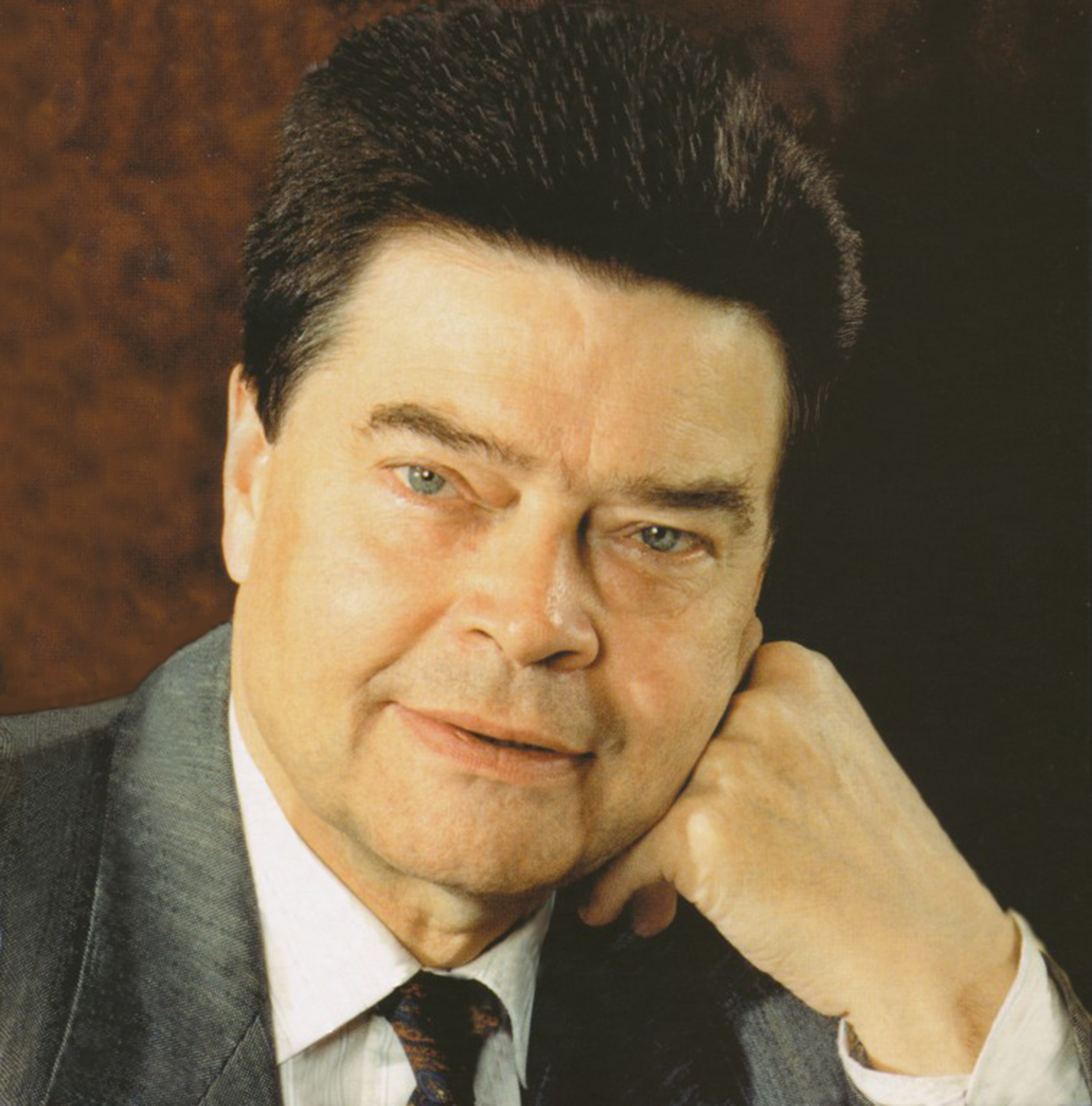

Minister of Foreign Affairs of the Soviet Union Acting
- In office 28 August – 18 November 1991
- Premier: Ivan Silayev
- Preceded by: Alexander Bessmertnykh
- Succeeded by: Eduard Shevardnadze (as Minister of External Relations)

Personal details
- Born: 20 February 1931 (age 95) Frunze, Kirghiz ASSR, Soviet Union
- Party: Communist Party of the Soviet Union
- Education: Moscow State University
- Profession: Journalism

Boris Dmitriyevich Pankin (Russian: Борис Дмитриевич Панкин; born 20 February 1931) is a former Soviet diplomat who served as acting Minister of Foreign Affairs of the USSR for a brief period in 1991.

== Earlier career ==
A reformer and journalist, Pankin was Soviet Ambassador to Sweden for eight years from 1982 to 1990. He was brought in to clean up after the Soviet Union's reputation was seriously tarnished in the aftermath of a diplomatic scandal in which a Whiskey-class Soviet submarine S-363 became marooned in Swedish territorial waters outside of Karlskrona. The incident became widely known as "Whiskey on the Rocks." Pankin became, and remains, very popular in Sweden, and was the Soviet Union's longest-serving Swedish envoy (although Alexandra Kollontai was Soviet Union's leading diplomat in Stockholm 1930–1945, and with the rank of ambassador from 1943).

Pankin was the last Soviet Ambassador to Czechoslovakia (1990–1991). Pankin is credited with preventing the Communist-Czechoslovak government from interfering in the Velvet Revolution - which led to playwright and dissident Václav Havel's rise to the presidency. Pankin is best known for being the highest-ranking diplomat to stand against the August putsch which sought to bring down Mikhail Gorbachev, the last Soviet leader and promulgator of Glasnost and Perestroika. Pankin was later recalled to Moscow to become Gorbachev's Foreign Minister.

On 28 August 1991, Gorbachev signed a decree appointing Pankin Minister of Foreign Affairs of the USSR and submitted this decision to the Supreme Soviet however, this decree was not approved. Despite this, Pankin de facto became acting minister. He headed the Foreign Ministry until November 18 of the same year.

== Soviet Foreign Minister ==
Pankin had only 82 days to serve as Foreign Minister before the Soviet Union's collapse in 1991. In that short period, he established diplomatic relations with the State of Israel, began the Soviet-US disarmament process, brought the Soviet Union closer to the European Union and purged the KGB from the ranks of the Soviet Foreign Ministry.

== Later career ==
After the dissolution of the Soviet Union, Pankin was named Russian Ambassador to the Court of St James's (UK), where he served until 1993.

Pankin now lives in Västerort in Stockholm, Sweden, and works as a lecturer and writer. In January 2005 he was given the "Stockholm Citizen of the Month Award" by the local government, recognizing his dedication and loyalty to his adopted home - the city of Stockholm. Boris Pankin sits on the Board of Advisors of the Global Panel Foundation - an NGO known for working behind-the-scenes in conflict areas.

== Books ==
- Pankin, Boris. The Last Hundred Days of the Soviet Union (ISBN 1850438781)
