= Shcherba =

Shcherba, Ščerba, Scherbo, or Szczerba is a Slavic-language surname. It has the same form for both genders in most languages, except Czech and Slovak. The word means "gap", "dent", or "nick" in some languages such as Polish. In Ukraine, it is also a term for certain kinds of soup. Related surnames include Shcherbak, Shcherbakov, and Shcherban.

Language	Masculine	Feminine
Belarusian	Шчэрба: Shcherba, Łacinka: Ščerba	
Czech, Slovak	Ščerba	Ščerbová
Polish	Szczerba (Polish pronunciation: [ˈʂt͡ʂɛrba]), Szczyrba	
Russian	Щербо: Shcherbo or Scherbo (scholarly: Ščerbo); Щерба: Shcherba, Scherba, Ščerba)	
Ukrainian	Щерба: Shcherba (scholarly: Ščerba)	

== People ==
=== Shcherba ===
- Hanna Shcherba, (born 1982), Belarusian-French swimmer
- Lev Shcherba (1880–1944), Belarusian-Russian linguist
- Mariya Shcherba (born 1985), Belarusian swimmer
- Uladzimir Shcherba (born 1986), Belarusian footballer

=== Ščerba, Ščerbová ===
- Denisa Ščerbová (born 1986), Czech athlete
- Josef Ščerba (1917–2000), Czechoslovak pilot in World War II
- Matěj Ščerba (born 1998), Czech pole vaulter

=== Szczerba ===
- Andrew Szczerba (born 1988), American football tight end
- Kazimierz Szczerba (born 1954), Polish amateur boxer
- Michał Szczerba (born 1977) Polish politician
- Tomasz Szczerba (born 2004), Canadian ice hockey player

=== Other spellings ===
- Vitaly Scherbo (born 1972), Belarusian gymnast
