= Astana International Forum =

International platform for dialogue

- Abbreviation: AIF
- Predecessor: Astana Economic Forum
- Formation: June 28, 2008
- Purpose: Promoting dialogue amongst political and business leaders to solutions to global challenges
- Headquarters: Astana, Kazakhstan
- Region served: Worldwide
- Official language: Kazakh; English; Russian
- Main organ: Economic Research Institute
- Parent organization: Governed by the Ministry of National Economy & Ministry of Foreign Affairs; Government of Kazakhstan
- Website: astanainternationalforum.org

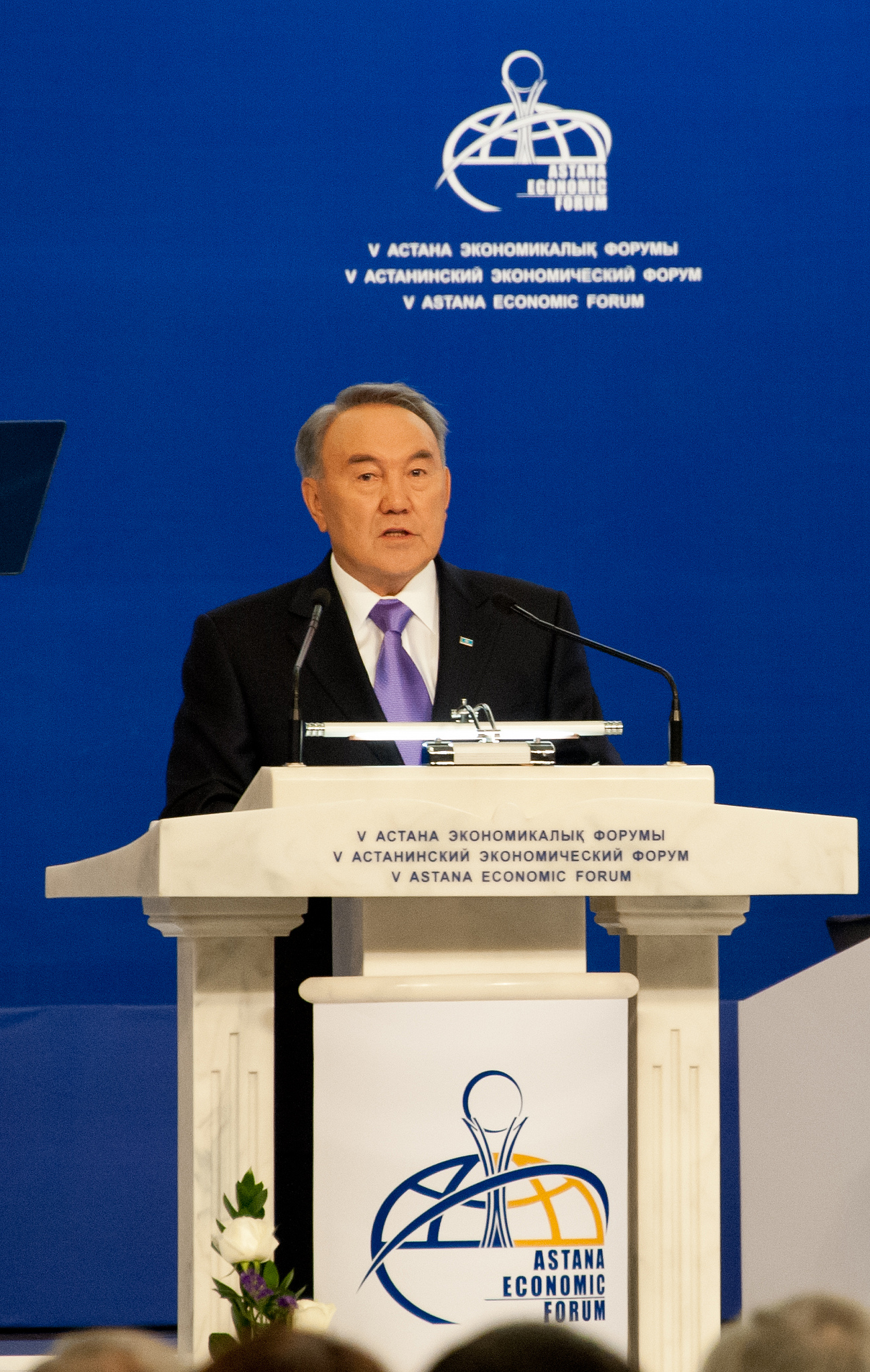
President of Kazakhstan at the Astana Economic Forum

The Astana International Forum (AIF) is an international and regional platform for dialogue and a non-profit organization headquartered in Astana, Kazakhstan. Previously called the Astana Economic Forum, it has been supported by the Government of Kazakhstan since 2008. The name change reflects the broader range of topics discussed at the organization's annual forum, such as climate change, geopolitics, food and energy security and is intended to draw attendees from around the world. The annual Forum is organized under the auspices of the Government of Kazakhstan, which includes the Economic Research Institute, Ministry of National Economy and Ministry of Foreign Affairs. The event is held each year in Astana; more than eight thousand delegates take part from one hundred countries: they include chief executive officers, politicians, journalists, scientists and Nobel Prize laureates.

== History ==
The Astana International Forum traces its roots to a proposal for a series of Eurasian integration initiatives made in a 1994 speech at Moscow State University by Kazakhstan President Nursultan Nazarbayev. In June 2007, Nazarbayev suggested creating a Eurasian Club of Scientists to help with the economic integration of the Eurasian community and to develop international economic cooperation. The Eurasian Economic Club of Scientists Association was established on June 27, 2008, by Kazakhstan's Ministry of Economy and Budget Planning and the Economic Research Institute. The Forum then branched out to focus on wider global issues, first changing its name to the Global Challenges Summit and then the Astana International Forum in 2023.

== Organizers ==
The Astana International Forum is mainly organized by the Economic Research Institute and several government ministries, as well as the National Bank of Kazakhstan. The United Nations is a strategic partner of the event, and large Kazakhstani companies are also partners, such as the National Welfare Fund Samruk-Kazyna, National Investment Holding Baiterek.

== Activities ==
=== Annual meetings ===
The Astana International Forum is held annually in Astana, Kazakhstan. Its recommendations are presented each year to a G-20 Summit.

1. The first dialogue was held on June 28, 2008, when the forum focused on topics regarding modern aspects of economic development under the conditions of globalization, macroeconomic regulation of the economy, globalization and the global competitiveness of the countries of Eurasia. The dialogue was attended by 100 leading scientists, prominent political leaders, entrepreneurs from over 40 countries. International organizations such as the United Nations, International Union of Economists, and European Economic Community also participated in the forum. Topics such as modern economics, economic development, economic stability and security, and Eurasian integration processes were discussed.
2. The second dialogue took place on March 11 and 12, 2009, when the forum focused on the economic security of Eurasia in the system of global risks. The recommendations of the forum were submitted to the 2009 G-20 London Summit in April 2009. The forum was attended by Nobel laureates Robert Mundell and Edmund Phelps, President Ahmad Muhammad Ali of the Islamic Bank of Development, the European Bank for Reconstruction and Development's former President Jean Lemier, officials of the United Nations and others.
3. During the third dialogue, July 1 and 2, 2010, the forum focused on the theme of "crisis lessons and post-crisis model of economic development in globalization conditions," which included topics on public-private partnerships, development of innovative economy and other issues. Topics on energy efficiency and developing renewable energy were also discussed.
4. The fourth dialogue, on May 3 and 4, 2011, focused on identifying new ways to develop the world's economy in three key trends: global economy and finance; business and investment; and economy and stable social development. Topics such as green economic development and environmental management were also included. People from different fields, coming from more than eighty countries, participated. Notable attendees were former President Stjepan Mesić of Croatia, former President Jorge Quiroga of Bolivia, former Prime Minister Jean Chrétien of Canada and others. International organizations, including the Food and Agriculture Organization and the Club de Madrid, were also represented.
5. The fifth dialogue took place from May 22 to 24, 2012. More than eight thousand delegates from one hundred different countries and international organizations attended. The agenda of the forum included discussion about reforming the world monetary system, food security, tourism development, alternative energy, implementation of innovation and attraction of investment. The Secretary-General of the United Nations, Ban Ki-moon, stressed the need for the world leaders to take action at the upcoming United Nations Conference on Sustainable Development in addressing the varied global issues.
6. The sixth dialogue was held from May 22 to 24, 2013. Over 10,000 participants attended the Forum, including representatives of international institutions (UN, IMF, WB, ADB, EBRD, etc.), government officials with huge managerial experience, leading scientists, Nobel Laureates, representatives of political, expert and the business communities. The presentation of the Astana Economic Forum was held in the historical center of the Financial District of New York – Wall Street on April 10, 2014. A unique Kazakhstani project was presented to the heads of international financial and investment companies, as well as experts of world stock exchanges.
7. The VII Astana Economic Forum and the II World Anti-Crisis Conference will be held on May 21–23, 2014; this year these events will be dedicated to the 70th anniversary of the Bretton Woods agreement.
8. The VIII Astana Economic Forum was held on May 21–22, 2015. The theme of the VIII AEF was "Infrastructure – a Driver of Economic Development." The 1st day of the forum was dedicated to Africa and was titled "Africa – the Next Driver of the Global Economy". Kazakhstan Minister of Foreign Affairs Erlan Idrissov noted: "A few years ago we started turning a keen eye on Africa. We believe it is a historic time when Africa should receive a full focus". Global co-organizers and partners of Astana Economic Forum 2015 included such organizations as the UN, OSCE, WEF, IMF, World Bank, UNDP and OECD.
9. The IX Astana Economic Forum took place on May 25–26, 2016. The main topic of the IX Forum is New Economic Reality: diversification, innovation and knowledge economy. The Great Silk Road forum will be held as a part of the XIX Astana Economic Forum. The IMF plans held its Regional Conference within the framework of the XIX Astana Economic Forum. The IMF Managing Director Christine Lagarde attended the Conference during her first-ever visit to Kazakhstan and the region.
10. The X Astana Economic Forum took place on June 15–16, 2017. The main topic of the meeting is New Energy – New Economy. During the Forum issues of sustainable economic growth, international trade and innovation will be discussed. The Forum will mark 25th anniversary of cooperation between Kazakhstan and the World Bank, as well as other events such as the Economist Innovation Forum, panel sessions organized by Boao Forum for Asia, UNDP, SAP, BCG, etc.
11. The XI Astana Economic Forum and Global Challenges Summit took place on 17–18 May 2018. The main topics are Unified Economy, Global Strategy, Urbanization and Sustainability. Speakers at the 2018 forum include former French president François Hollande, former Italian prime minister Romano Prodi, 8th UN secretary-general Ban Ki-Moon, futurologist Michio Kaku, and Apple co-founder Steve Wozniak.
12. The XII Astana Economic Forum was held in Nur-Sultan on May 16–17, 2019. The theme of the forum was "Inspiring growth: people, cities, economies." 5,500 delegates from 74 countries participated in the event that comprised more than 50 sessions on topical global issues. The third annual Kazakhstan Global Investment Roundtable (KGIR-2019) was held as part of the XII Astana Economic Forum. At the KGIR-2019, international investors and Kazakh companies signed 43 agreements totalling $8.7 billion.
13. The first iteration of the event under its new name Astana International Forum, took place on 8-9 June 2023. The Forum's mission statement was 'Tackling challenges through dialogue: towards cooperation, development & progress'. Sessions addressed global challenges around foreign policy and international security, international development and sustainability, energy and climate change and economy and finance. Around 5,000 delegates from over 50 countries attended, including President Kassym-Jomart Tokayev of Kazakhstan, Emir Tamim bin Hamad Al Thani of Qatar, President Sadyr Japarov of Kyrgyzstan, Prime Minister Abdulla Aripov of Uzbekistan, UNESCO Director-General Audrey Azoulay, IMF Managing Director Kristalina Georgieva, and OSCE Secretary General Helga Schmid.
14. AIF 2024 would have been held on 13-14 June 2024. The event's theme would have been ‘Empowering People, Uniting Nations: Building a Better World Together’. Due to severe floods in April 2024 President Kassym-Jomart Tokayev cancelled the 2024 event.
15. Under the tagline “Connecting Minds, Shaping the Future”, the 2025 Astana International Forum is scheduled to take place on 29-30 May in Astana. The event gathers thousands of delegates from around the world to discuss global issues organised around three thematic areas: Foreign Policy and International Security, Energy and Climate Change, and Economy and Finance. The program features high-level one-on-one sessions with senior politicians and industry leaders, as well as larger panel discussions with renown experts and policymakers. Kassym-Jomart Tokayev, President of Kazakhstan, will open the event, welcoming other world leaders such as Paul Kagame, President of Rwanda; Andrej Plenković, Prime Minister of Croatia; Mohammed bin Abdulrahman Al Thani, Prime Minister and Foreign Minister of Qatar; Ban Ki Moon, former Secretary General of the United Nations; and Amy E. Pope, Director General of the International Organisation for Migration.

== See also ==
- Global economic conferences
- G-20 Summit
- The city of Astana
