= Arkady Volsky =

Russian politician and businessman (1932–2006)

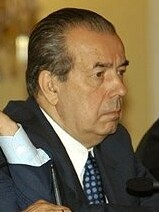
- On November 2003

Deputy Chairman of the Committee on the Operational Management of the Soviet Economy
- In office 24 August 1991 – 19 December 1991 Serving with Grigory Yavlinsky and Yury Luzhkov
- Premier: Ivan Silayev

Personal details
- Born: Arkady Ivanovich Volsky; 15 May 1932 Dobrush, Gomel Region, BSSR, Soviet Union
- Died: 9 September 2006 (aged 74) Moscow, Russia
- Resting place: Novodevichy Cemetery, Moscow, Russia
- Children: 2
- Education: Moscow Institute of Steel and Alloys

Arkady Volsky (Russian: Аркадий Вольский; 15 May 1932 – 9 September 2006) was a Soviet politician and businessman. He served as a senior aide to three Soviet General Secretaries, including Mikhail Gorbachev, and was one of three Deputy Prime Ministers in the last government of the Soviet Union between August and December 1991. He was founder and the first head of the Russian Union of Industrialists and Entrepreneurs (RSPP).

== Early life and education ==
Volsky was born in Dobrush (now Belarus), on 15 May 1932. He was raised in an orphanage. He studied metallurgy at Moscow Institute of Steel and Alloys and graduated with an engineering degree in 1955.

== Career ==
After graduation, Volsky started his career as an assistant foreman at Likhachyov car plant in Moscow. In 1969, he became the Communist Party's top representative at the factory. Then he began to work at the machine-building or the engineering industry department of the party. During this period he gained influence over the Soviet directorial corps.

He served as a senior aide to three Soviet General Secretaries. His first post of advisor was in 1983 for the Soviet General Secretary Yuri Andropov concerning economic affairs. He continued to serve as an assistant on economic affairs to the next General Secretary Konstantin Chernenko. When Chernenko died in 1985, Volsky became a senior aide to his successor Mikhail Gorbachev. On 24 July 1988, Volsky was named as the representative of the Politburo in the Karabakh province or governor of the province. His official title was "representative of the central committee and supreme Soviet" in Karabakh. During the same period, he became a member of the Communist Party central committee's division in charge of industry. On 12 January 1989, Gorbachev appointed him head of an eight-member committee of special administration for Nagorno-Karabakh. The commission was incapable of settling the dispute. After bloody conflict on 20 January 1990, Volsky and his team left the region. In the 1990 elections, Volsky ran for a parliamentary seat, but he lost the election. Shortly after his defeat, Volsky was named as the head of the scientific and industrial union that was a pro-Gorbachev body consisting of the state enterprises directors.

In July 1991, Volsky and other prominent politicians such as Alexander Yakovlev, Eduard Shevardnadze, Gavriil Popov and Anatoly Sobchak issued a declaration in order to create a movement for democratic reforms. On 24 August 1991, following the August Coup, Volsky was appointed by Gorbachev as deputy prime minister in the cabinet headed by Prime Minister Ivan Silayev for operative management of the USSR economy. Volsky was in charge with industry and military complex until the dissolution of the Soviet Union in December 1991.

After the communist regime collapsed, Volsky founded the Russian Union of Industrialists and Entrepreneurs (RSPP), the business lobby, in 1991 and headed it until 2005. Alexander Shokhin replaced Volsky in the post. The RSPP, called "Union of Red Directors" at the beginning of the 2000s, is the successor of the previous USSR scientific and industrial union in the Russian Federation. He was also one of the major leaders of Civic Union, a bloc of centrist figures, which was founded in December 1992. The bloc was made up by the People's Party of Free Russia led by Alexander Rutskoy, the Socialist Party of the Working People, the Union for Revival of Russia, the Social Democratic Centre headed by Oleg Rumyantsev, and the RSPP and Democratic Reform Movement, both led by Volsky. It became a very powerful movement in summer 1992. However, its success did not last long, and the bloc was dissolved in summer 1993. Volsky also left the bloc.

In June 1995, Volsky was appointed by Prime Minister Viktor Chernomyrdin as deputy head of the peace mission for the conflict in the Chechen Republic. Volsky met the Chechen President Dzhokhar Dudayev at his mountain hide-out near Grozny in July 1995. It was the first meeting between senior Russian and Chechen officials since the beginning of the Chechen War.

== Personal life ==
Volsky was married and had two children, a son and a daughter. He was described as "a man who is always in the shadows."

== Death and burial ==
Volsky died of complications of leukemia at age 74 in Moscow on 9 September 2006. After civil memorial and church service with the attendance of state and political figures of Russia, businessmen, ambassadors, his body was buried at Moscow's Novodevichy Cemetery on 12 September 2006.

== Legacy ==
Robin White's 2002 fiction, The Ice Curtain, includes Volsky's hypothetical activities in regard to a diamond cartel in Russia.
