= Silayev's Government =

Silayev's Government (Committee for operative management of national economy)
- 29th Government of the Soviet Union

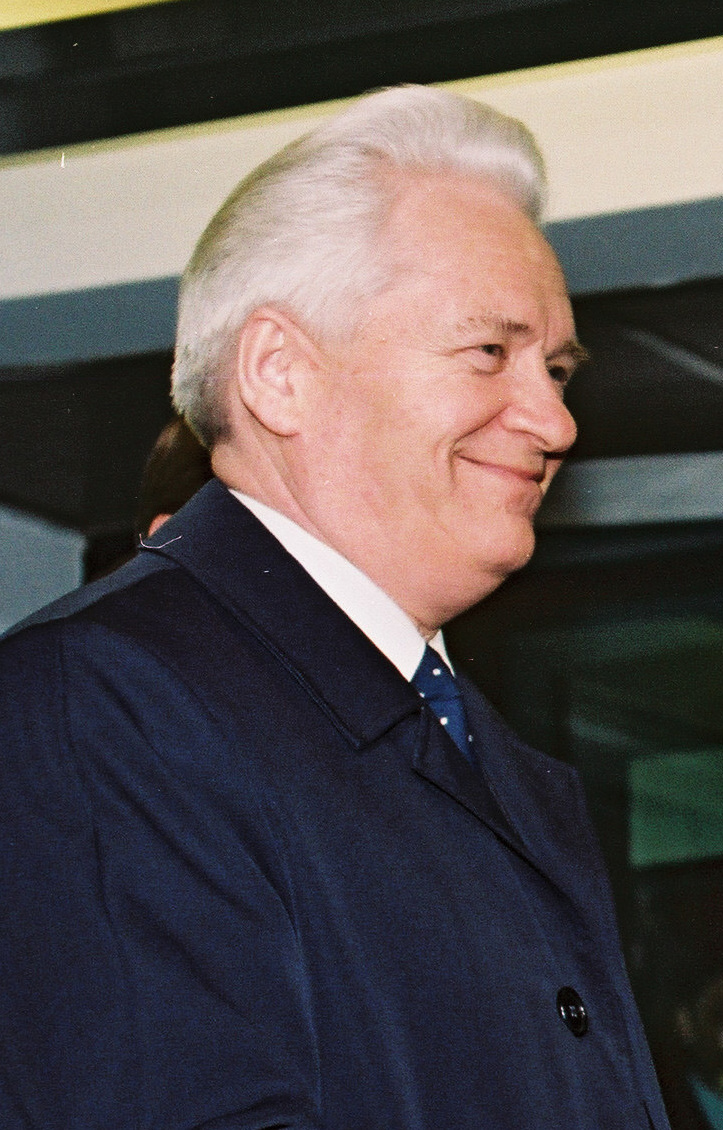
- Date formed: 28 August 1991
- Date dissolved: 19 December 1991 (de jure); 25 December 1991 (de facto)

People and organisations
- Head of state: Mikhail Gorbachev
- Head of government: Ivan Silayev

History
- Predecessor: Pavlov's Government
- Successor: none (de facto); Cabinet of Boris Yeltsin and Yegor Gaidar(de jure)

Committee for operative management of national economy of the Soviet Union (Russian: Комитет по оперативному управлению народным хозяйством, romanized: Komitet po operativnomu upravleniyu narodnym khozyaistvom) was the official name for the provisional office of state administration of the Soviet Union with government functions following dismissal of the Cabinet of Ministers of the Soviet Union on 28 August 1991.

The former government of Valentin Pavlov was dissolved following the failed August Coup against Mikhail Gorbachev and his supporters. Ivan Silayev, who had been appointed chairman of the newly formed committee on 24 August with the task of finding a new government, was instead granted on 28 August the authority of the dissolved cabinet of ministers and de facto the office of the premier. The dissolution of the committee had been declared by Russian president Boris Yeltsin through presidential decree on 19 December (without confirmation by Soviet President Gorbachev), the deputy chairs retired on that day, but the chair and ministers continued to work until the resignation of President Gorbachev on 25 December.

On 5 September 1991 the Inter-Republican Economic Committee of the USSR (headed by Silayev also) was established as an additional, more important and powerful body and was on 14 November transformed into the Interstate Economic Committee of the Economic Community, a body which sought to become an international body tasked with coordinating the economies of the remaining and former Soviet republics. Yet, the national Soviet Committee for operative management continued to work alongside the Inter-Republican/Interstate Committee and function as the nation's government until the dissolution of the Soviet Union.

== Composition ==
Ministry	Minister	Took office	Left office
Chairman of the Committee	Ivan Silayev	24 August 1991	25 December 1991
Deputy Chairmen	Arkady Volsky	24 August 1991	19 December 1991
Deputy Chairmen	Yury Luzhkov	24 August 1991	29 October 1991
Deputy Chairmen	Grigory Yavlinsky	24 August 1991	19 December 1991
Minister of Finance	Vladimir Rayevsky (acting)	28 August 1991	25 December 1991
Minister for General Economic Affairs	Yevgeny Saburov	28 August 1991	25 December 1991
Minister of Trade	Alexander Khlystov	28 August 1991	25 December 1991
Minister of Foreign Economic Relations	Valery Mangazeyev	28 August 1991	25 December 1991
Minister of Foreign Affairs	Boris Pankin (acting)	28 August 1991	18 November 1991
Minister of External Relations	Eduard Shevardnadze	19 November 1991	19 December 1991
Minister of Defence	Yevgeny Shaposhnikov	29 August 1991	25 December 1991
Minister of Interior	Victor Barannikov	29 August 1991	19 December 1991
Minister of Culture	Nikolai Gubenko	7 September 1991	27 November 1991
Minister of Labour and Social Affairs	Nikolai Kolosov (acting)	28 August 1991	25 December 1991
Minister for Material and Technical Support of the National Economy	Amangeldy Bektemisov	28 August 1991	25 December 1991
Minister of Fuel and Energy Complex	Igor Gavrilov	28 August 1991	25 December 1991

== Committees ==
Committee	Chairman	Period
Chairman of State Committee for State Security (KGB)	Vadim Bakatin	29 August – 25 December 1991

Government offices
Preceded by Pavlov	Governments of the Soviet Union; 28 August 1991 – 25 December 1991	Succeeded by —
