= Vitaly Doguzhiyev =

Soviet era politician

- Виталий Догужиев

Prime Minister of the Soviet Union Acting
- In office 19 August 1991 – 28 August 1991
- President: Mikhail Gorbachev
- Preceded by: Valentin Pavlov
- Succeeded by: Ivan Silayev (as Chairman of the Committee on the Operational Management of the Soviet Economy)

First Deputy Premier of the Soviet Union
- In office 15 January 1991 – 26 November 1991
- Premier: Valentin Pavlov; Ivan Silayev
- Preceded by: Vladilen Niktin
- Succeeded by: Post abolished

Personal details
- Born: 25 December 1935 Yenakiyevo, Ukrainian SSR, Soviet Union
- Died: 3 October 2016 (aged 80) Moscow, Russia
- Party: Communist Party of the Soviet Union

Vitaly Husseynovich Doguzhiyev (Russian: Виталий Хуссейнович Догужиев; 25 December 1935 – 3 October 2016) was a Soviet official appointed as the First Deputy Prime Minister of the Cabinet of Ministers in 1991. Together with Vladimir Velichko, he was the last official on this position before the dissolution of the Soviet Union.

== Life and career ==
He graduated from the Dnipropetrovsk University in 1958.

During the events of 19–22 August 1991, due to the illness of the USSR Prime Minister Valentin Pavlov, Doguzhiev was temporarily assigned the duties of the head of government. On 28 August the functions of the government of the Soviet Union were entrusted to the Committee on the Operational Management of the Soviet economy (COMSE) led by Ivan Silayev.

== Sources ==
- Vitaly Doguzhiyev at WarHeroes.ru (in Russian)
