= Albert Shcherbakov =

Russian footballer

Personal information
- Full name: Albert Nikolayevich Shcherbakov
- Date of birth: 27 May 1976 (age 50)
- Height: 1.86 m (6 ft 1 in)
- Position: Defender

Youth career
- FC Smena Moscow

Senior career*
| Years | Team | Apps | (Gls) |
| 1994 | FC Asmaral Moscow | 0 | (0) |
| 1994 | → FC Asmaral-d Moscow (loan) | 28 | (0) |
| 1995 | FC Smena Moscow | 39 | (1) |
| 1996–1998 | FC Chkalovets Novosibirsk | 69 | (4) |
| 1998–1999 | FC Shinnik Yaroslavl | 20 | (0) |
| 2001 | FC Chkalovets-Olimpik Novosibirsk | 10 | (1) |
| 2002–2004 | FC Chkalovets-1936 Novosibirsk | 49 | (2) |
- * Club domestic league appearances and goals

Albert Nikolayevich Shcherbakov (Russian: Альберт Николаевич Щербаков; born 27 May 1976) is a former Russian footballer who used to play as a defender.
