= State Committee on Prices =

Governmental body of the former Soviet Union

Goskomtsen (Russian: Госкомцен) was the State Committee on Prices in the Soviet Union. This governmental body regulated all prices, from agricultural to consumer goods and established prices for all imports and some exports.
