= Cabinet of Ministers (Soviet Union) =

1991 executive body in USSR

Soviet Union Cabinet of Ministers

Agency overview
- Formed: 14 January 1991
- Preceding agency: Council of Ministers
- Dissolved: 28 August 1991
- Superseding agency: Committee on the Operational Management of the Soviet Economy
- Jurisdiction: Union of Soviet Socialist Republics
- Headquarters: Moscow Kremlin in Moscow, RSFSR, Soviet Union later moved to former headquarters of the State Committee for Construction
- Employees: 55 members (February 1991)
- Minister responsible: Valentin Pavlov, Prime Minister of the Soviet Union

The Cabinet of Ministers of the USSR (Russian: Кабинет Министров СССР, romanized: Kabinet Ministrov SSSR) served as the administrative and executive body of the Soviet Union after the dissolution of the previous Council of Ministers. Established on January 14, 1991, it was composed of the Prime Minister, seven deputies (including two first deputy prime ministers), and 36 ministers, alongside one state committee. The Cabinet's key decision-making organ was the Presidium, which included the Prime Minister, his deputies, and an Administrator of affairs.

== Responsibilities and functions ==
The Cabinet of Ministers was responsible for a wide range of functions, including:

- Formulating and executing the All-Union state budget
- Administering defense enterprises and overseeing space research
- Implementing foreign policy and combating crime
- Maintaining defense and social security
- Collaborating with republican governments to develop financial and credit policies
- Administering fuel, power supplies, and transport systems
- Developing welfare and social programs

Additionally, the Cabinet coordinated All-Union policies on science, technology, patents, airspace use, pricing, general economic policy, housing, environmental protection, and military appointments. It had the authority to issue decrees and resolutions.

== Central government bodies ==
The Cabinet existed alongside other key bodies, such as the Federation Council and the Presidential Council of the Soviet Union, but it was the primary executive organ responsible for the ministers and the economy. The ministries within the Cabinet included:

- Ministry of Agriculture and Food
- Ministry of Defense
- Ministry of Health
- Ministry of Culture
- Ministry of Foreign Affairs
- Ministry of Transport Construction
- Ministry of Environmental Protection
- Ministry of Nuclear Power Industry

== Structure ==
The Cabinet of Ministers had 3 primary divisions within itself, all 3 holding different levels of power:

=== Prime Minister of the USSR ===
The Prime Minister of the USSR was the head of the Soviet government and a former member of the Presidium of the Cabinet of Ministers of the USSR. This role was nominated by the President of the USSR, and approved by the Supreme Soviet of the USSR. Their powers included:

- Organizing work of the Cabinet of Ministers of the USSR and its Presidium
- Distribution of duties
- Ensuring cooperative work within the Cabinet of Ministers
- Representation of the USSR in international relations
- Making decisions on issues of public administration that did not require consideration at a meeting
- Encouragement of ministers of the USSR and other officials of bodies subordinate to the Cabinet of Ministers of the USSR

The Prime Minister and members of the Cabinet of Ministers reported on their activities at sessions of the Supreme Soviet and meetings of the standing commissions of the chambers and committees at the Supreme Soviet. The Prime Minister had the right to raise the question of confidence in the Cabinet of Ministers at these meetings and in reports.

=== Presidium of the Cabinet of Ministers of the USSR ===
The Presidium of the Cabinet of Ministers was composed of the Prime Minister, his deputies, and ministers of the USSR. It had its capabilities defined by a USSR law named "On the Cabinet of Ministers of the USSR", which was made to follow the former Council of Ministers, the preceding agency the Cabinet was replacing. The Presidium's main purpose was to decide on matters of public administration within the jurisdiction of the USSR.

=== Apparatus of the USSR Cabinet of Ministers ===
The Apparatus of the Cabinet of Ministers was created on May 22nd, 1991, in accordance with the aforementioned law "On the Cabinet of Ministers of the USSR". It was composed of the original departments of the Cabinet of Ministers, along with secretariats of the PM, the Apparatus of the State Council for Economic Reform and the Apparatus of State Commissions of the Cabinet Ministers. It was headed by the Manager Affairs of the Cabinet of Ministers; a role that could only be filled by a former member of the Presidium. Within said Apparatus were the 'Departments of the Cabinet Ministers', which fulfilled many key tasks that were employed to the cabinet, such as preparing proposals, preparing analytical information, and studying information published by state media.

==== Structure of the apparatus of the USSR Cabinet of Ministers ====
Below is a list of departments within the Apparatus, listed in terms of power.

1. Economic Department
2. Department of Social Development
3. Department of Industry
4. Department of Transport and Communications
5. Defense Department
6. Agro-Industrial Department
7. Department of Scientific and Technological Progress
8. Department of Foreign Economic Relations
9. Department of Territorial Development and Capital Construction
10. Department of Education,Culture and Health
11. Legal Department
12. Human Resources Department
13. General Department
14. Secretariat of the Prime Minister
15. Press Service of the Prime Minister
16. Secretariats of Deputy Prime Ministers
17. Office of the State Council for Economic Reform
18. Office of the State Military-Industrial Commission
19. Office of the State Fuel and Energy Commission
20. Office of the State Commission for Emergency Situations
21. Financial and economic department
22. Government Archives
23. Government Library

== Dissolution ==
The Cabinet of Ministers was dissolved on August 28, 1991, after a vote of no confidence was declared by the Supreme Soviet. It was subsequently succeeded by the Committee on the Operational Management of the Soviet Economy.

== See also ==
- Pavlov's Government
