= Shcherbachov =

Shcherbachov, feminine: Shcherbachova is a Russian-language surname. Notable people with the name include:

- Nikolai Shcherbachov (1853–1922), Russian composer and pianist
- Vladimir Shcherbachov (1889–1952), Russian/Soviet composer and teacher
- Lyubov Shcherbachova, birth name of Lyubov Yanovska (1861–1933), Ukrainian writer and feminist

== See also ==
- Shcherbachev
- Shcherbakov (disambiguation)Shcherbakov
