= Ivan Silayev =

Soviet and Russian politician (1930–2023)

- Иван Силаев
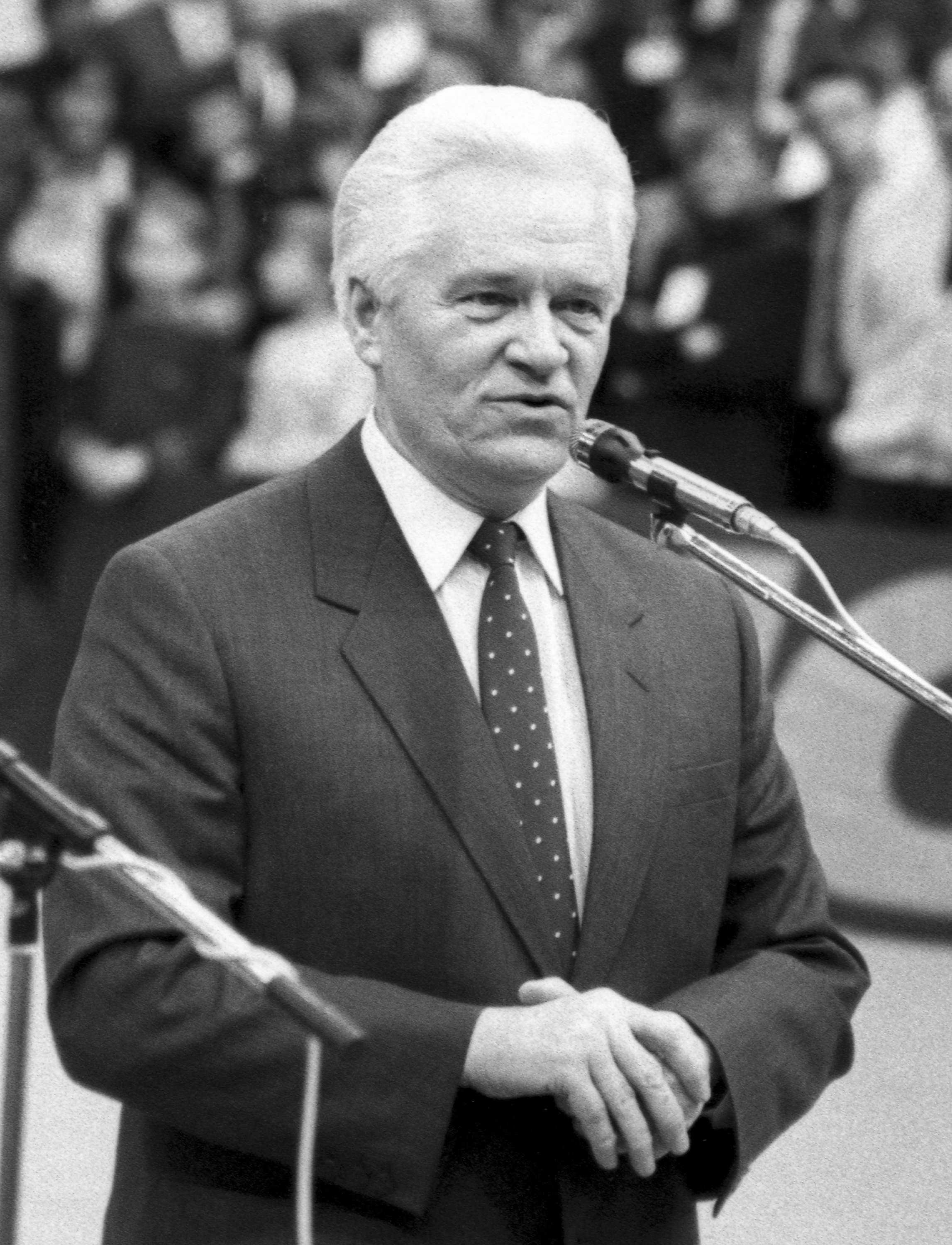
- Silayev in 1991

Chairman of the Committee on the Operational Management of the Soviet Economy
- In office 24 August 1991 – 25 December 1991
- President: Mikhail Gorbachev
- Deputy: Arkady Volsky; Yury Luzhkov; Grigory Yavlinsky
- Preceded by: Valentin Pavlov (as Prime Minister of the Soviet Union)
- Succeeded by: Office abolished Powers transferred to Boris Yeltsin as Interim Head of Government of Russia

Permanent Representative of Russia to the European Community
- In office 18 December 1991 – 7 February 1994
- Preceded by: Lev Voronin (for the Soviet Union)
- Succeeded by: Vasily Likhachev

Chairman of the Inter-republican Economic Committee of the Soviet Union
- In office 20 September 1991 – 14 November 1991
- Preceded by: Post established
- Succeeded by: Post abolished

Chairman of the Council of Ministers of the Russian SFSR
- In office 15 June 1990 – 26 September 1991
- President: Boris Yeltsin
- Preceded by: Aleksandr Vlasov
- Succeeded by: Oleg Lobov (acting)

Deputy Chairman of the Council of Ministers of the Soviet Union
- In office 1 November 1985 – 9 October 1990
- Premier: Nikolai Ryzhkov

Minister of Aviation Industry
- In office 20 February 1981 – 1 November 1985
- Premier: Nikolai Tikhonov; Nikolai Ryzhkov
- Preceded by: Vasily Kazakov
- Succeeded by: Appolon Systov

Minister of Machine-Tool and Tool Building Industry
- In office 19 December 1980 – 20 February 1981
- Premier: Nikolai Tikhonov
- Preceded by: Anatoly Kostousov
- Succeeded by: Boris Balmont

Full member of the 26th, 27th, 28th Central Committee
- In office 3 March 1981 – 26 July 1991

Personal details
- Born: 21 October 1930 Baktyzino, Nizhny Novgorod Oblast, Soviet Union
- Died: 8 February 2023 (aged 92) Nizhny Novgorod, Russia
- Party: Independent
- Other political affiliations: Communist Party of the Soviet Union (1959–1991)
- Awards: Hero of Socialist Labour, Order of Lenin, Order of the October Revolution, Lenin Prize, Diploma of the Government of Russia
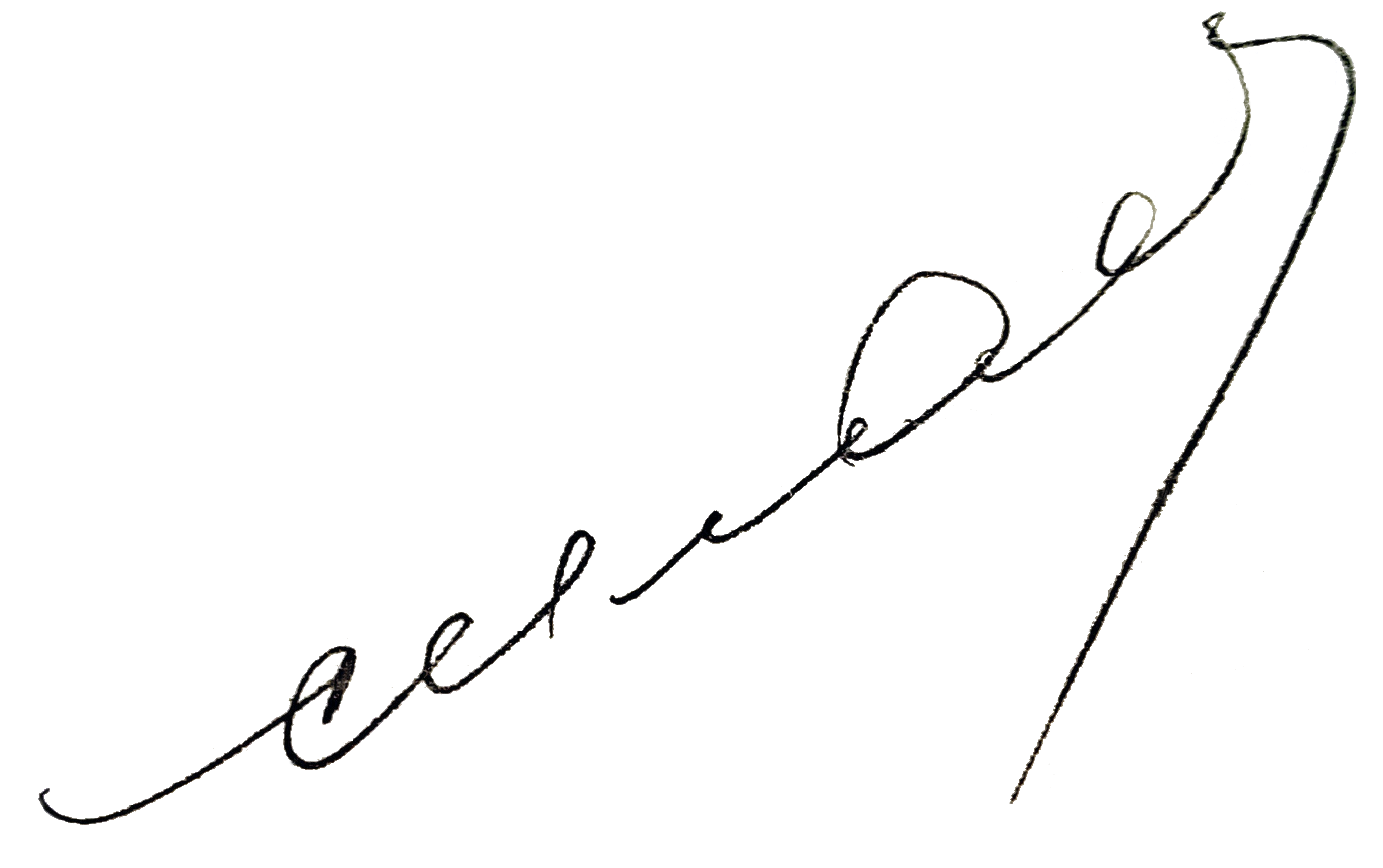
- Signature

Ivan Stepanovich Silayev (Russian: Иван Степанович Силаев; 21 October 1930 – 8 February 2023) was a Soviet and Russian politician. He served as Prime Minister of the Soviet Union through the offices of chairman of the Committee on the Operational Management of the Soviet economy (28 August – 25 December 1991) and chairman of the Inter-republican Economic Committee (20 September – 14 November 1991). Responsible for overseeing the economy of the Soviet Union during the late Gorbachev era, he was the last head of government of the Soviet Union, succeeding Valentin Pavlov.

After graduating in the 1950s, Silayev began his political career in the Ministry of Aviation Industry in the 1970s. During the Brezhnev Era he became Minister of Aviation Industry, Minister of Machine-Tool and Tool Building Industry, and a Central Committee member. When Nikolai Tikhonov's Second Government was dissolved, Mikhail Gorbachev appointed him in 1985 deputy chairman of the Council of Ministers in Nikolai Ryzhkov's First Government. He left all posts in the central government in October 1990 to focus in his post as chairman of the Council of Ministers of the Russian SFSR, which he had been appointed to in June of that year. There he faced several cabinet difficulties during his tenure, and while he supported the majority of Boris Yeltsin's policies, he opposed the secessionist policies of Yeltsin, which led to the disintegration of the Soviet Union, during his concurrent tenure as Soviet Premier, which he overtook in August 1991. Therefore, a month later, he was removed from the post of Prime Minister of the Russian SFSR and was replaced by acting Prime Minister Oleg Lobov.

Silayev de facto became Prime Minister of the Soviet Union on 28 August 1991 following the failed August coup and the abolishment of the Cabinet of Ministers, when no new cabinet could be formed and the new economic committee, chaired by him since 24 August, was granted the authority of the cabinet. After the dissolution of the Soviet Union, he continued to work for the Yeltsin administration as the Permanent Representative of Russia to the European Community (the European Union since 1992) until his resignation in 1994. During the 2007 legislative election, Silayev ran as a candidate for the Agrarian Party of Russia.

== Early life and career ==
Silayev was born on 21 October 1930, in Baktyzino, Nizhny Novgorod Oblast, Russian SFSR, Soviet Union. He graduated from the Kazan Aviation Institute in 1954 as a mechanical engineer. In 1959 Silayev became a member of the Communist Party of the Soviet Union (CPSU). During his tenure at the Gorky Aviation Plant (Gorky is now Nizhny Novgorod), where he started in 1954, he advanced from the lowest level to become the plant's foreman from 1971 to 1974.

Following this, Silayev served as Deputy Minister of Aviation Industry, and was later appointed Minister of Aviation Industry in 1981 in Nikolai Tikhonov's first government. He served briefly as Minister of Machine-Tool and Tool Building Industry of the Soviet Union from 1980 to 1981. At the 26th Congress Silayev was elected to the Central Committee (CPSU). In 1985, during Mikhail Gorbachev's rule, Silayev was appointed deputy chairman of the Council of Ministers and chairman of the Machine-Building Bureau of the Council of Ministers in Nikolai Ryzhkov's first and second governments. He served in these posts until he was appointed Premier of the Russian SFSR in 1990. In 1986, he served as head of a government commission into the Chernobyl Disaster.

== Russian SFSR premiership ==
=== Appointment ===
The election of a Chairman of the Council of Ministers – Government of the Russian Soviet Federative Socialist Republic (RSFSR), literally Premier of the Russian SFSR, was not considered a very important event; the Premier was elected following the election of the chairman of the Supreme Soviet of the Russian SFSR, the Supreme Soviet's deputy chairman, and after a debate on Russian agriculture. Boris Yeltsin, the chairman of the Russian SFSR Supreme Soviet, was ordered to select candidates for the post of Premier to the Supreme Soviet. Mikhail Bocharov, a successful businessman and leader of the cooperative movement, rector of the Moscow Aviation Institute Yuri Ryzhkov, and Silayev were chosen as the candidates. Ryzhkov withdrew his candidacy before the first round of voting was finished. During the election, Bocharov revealed his radical economic reform plan to the Supreme Soviet deputies; in it industry would be privatized, and subsidies to unprofitable enterprises would cease in a 100 Days reform package. Silayev did not have any similar economic reform plans but was widely considered to be Yeltsin's favourite for the post.

In the first round of voting, Silayev earned 119 votes, while Bocharov earned 86 votes. To be elected to the post, a candidate needed to win over half of the vote; neither Silayev nor Bocharov succeeded in this. Seeing that Silayev was Yeltsin's favourite, and had won more votes than Bocharov, Silayev ran unchallenged in the second election round, and was thus elected by 15 June a large margin. On June 18, the Congress of People's Deputies of the RSFSR approved the appointment of Silayev as Prime Minister.

Gorbachev tried to break the Silayev–Yeltsin alliance but to no avail. In 1989, Valentin Pavlov, the Prime Minister of the Soviet Union from 14 January to 28 August 1991, had gathered together enough information on the errors and omissions of Silayev to weaken his position as Deputy Premier. Silayev never forgave Pavlov and relations between the two grew colder when Pavlov became the Prime Minister.

=== Silayev's government ===
Silayev repeatedly opined that if he ever was given conflicting instructions by the Premier of the Soviet Union and Yeltsin, he would always "observe the laws of the RSFSR", meaning he would obey Yeltsin. During his tenure as Premier, Silayev was never the de facto leader of the government cabinet and was loyal to Yeltsin and the Supreme Soviet. In contrast to his predecessor, Aleksandr Vlasov, Silayev tried to modernise the Russian Government. Silayev decided to break with the old Soviet nomenklatura system of electing cabinet members by electing members using an "objective" and "scientific" basis. To accomplish this, Silayev asked professional psychologists to interview candidate cabinet members. Only 14 of the 200 cabinet candidates were recommended for a post in the government cabinet; even so, several of the candidates were given a post in the new government. All candidate members were selected by either Silayev, Yeltsin, or the Supreme Soviet.

Silayev's government lacked ideological unity, and several conservative members were elected to the cabinet in July 1990, among them Oleg Lobov and Gennadii Kulik. In November 1990, Grigory Yavlinsky resigned from his cabinet post, citing the failure of the 500 Days Programme. However, some commentators believe Yavlinsky resigned because of frequent conflict between him and other cabinet members. RSFSR Minister of Finance Boris Fyodorov resigned on 5 December 1990, and accused the First Deputy Premiers of taking important financial decisions on behalf of the ministry and him as minister behind his back. Lobov, the First Deputy Premier in charge of regional development, had become a de facto leader of the cabinet. Lobov was Yeltsin's favourite, and tried to weaken Silayev's position within the cabinet. With the consent of the Supreme Soviet Silayev established a 16-member Presidium for the cabinet.

Another problem facing Silayev was that the Supreme Soviet was usurping the power of the executive branch by strengthening the legislative branch. To accomplish this, the Supreme Soviet established duplicated entities, such as the Committee for Mass Media, which duplicated the functions of the Ministry of Mass Media. Viktor Kisin, the Minister of Industry, told the press that the only employee of his ministry was in fact himself. In July 1990, Silayev agreed to create parallel executive-legislative administrative bodies.

In December 1990, the Congress of People's Deputies of the Russian SFSR entrusted Silayev and his government to create a new plan for economic reform. The plan was finished in April 1991, and was referred to as the "Yeltsin–Silayev Plan". The plan was heavily influenced by the 500 Days Programme, and supported privatisation and the marketisation of the economy. The reform plan was criticised by an official from the State Committee on Economic Reform of the central government; he called the plan "a statement of intents"; instead of an economic reform, he called it a "manifesto". A Supreme Soviet deputy noted the proposed reform lacked real statistical insight. Even so, the proposed reform received a majority in a Supreme Soviet vote; Yeltsin's supporters knew that his economic reform proposal had to be accepted before the July presidential election. Following the July presidential election, the Russian government resigned, and the post of premier was once again up for election. Silayev had strong competitors for the post, such as Yurii Skokov, but won the election.

== Soviet premiership ==
The State Committee for the State of Emergency failed to arrest Silayev or any other high-standing Russian state officials during the August Coup. Silayev was one of several leading Russian SFSR politicians who flew to Gorbachev's summer house in the immediate aftermath of the failed coup. On 24 August, the Russian SFSR Council of Ministers issued a decree transferring central government authority over economic and communications ministries to the RSFSR Government, and took control of the Communist Party of the Soviet Union and KGB archives. With the central government's authority greatly weakened, Gorbachev established a four-man committee, led by Silayev, that included Grigory Yavlinsky, Arkady Volsky, and Yuri Luzhkov, to elect a new Cabinet of Ministers. This committee was later transformed into the Committee on the Operational Management of the Soviet economy (COMSE), also chaired by Silayev, to manage the Soviet economy.

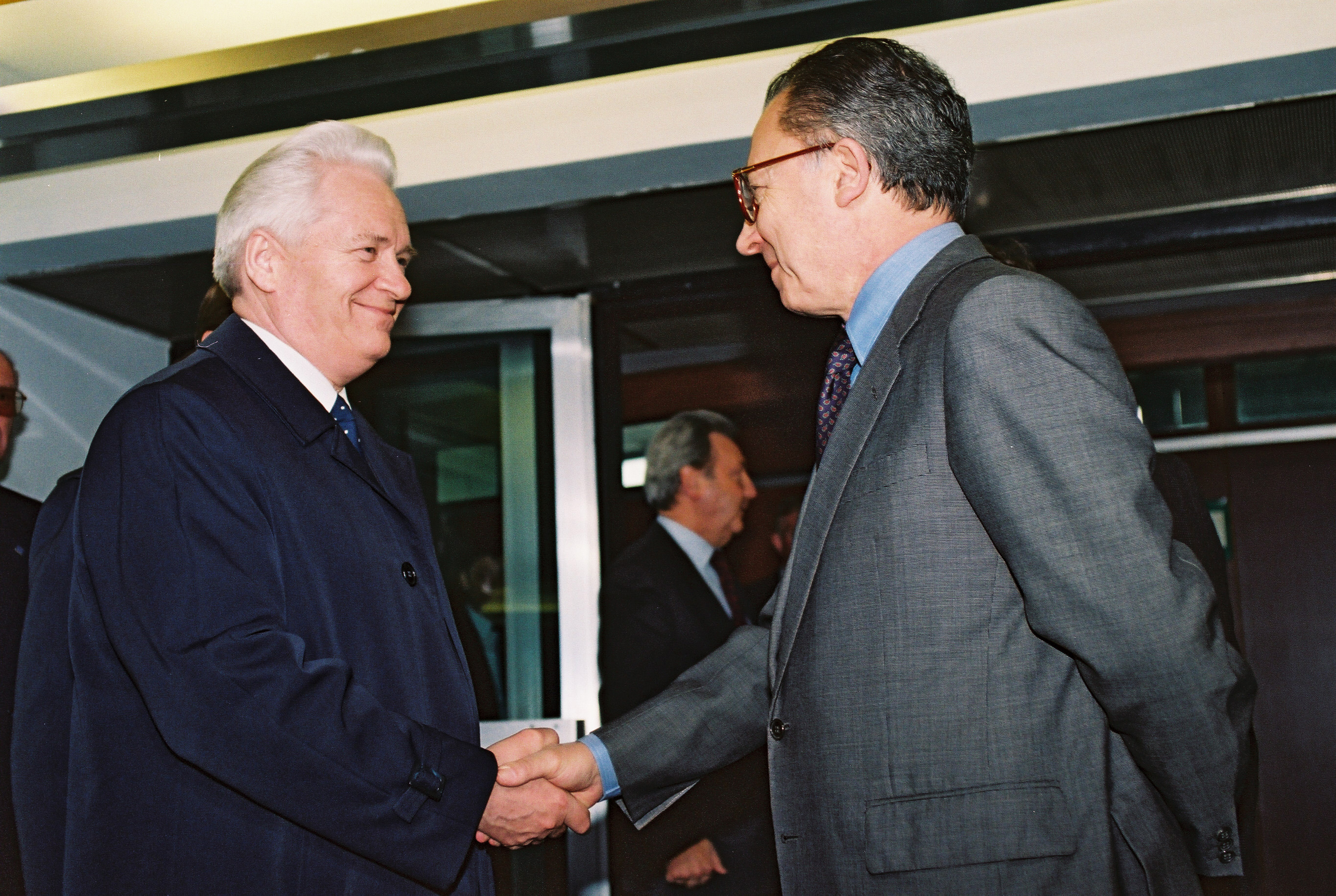
Inter-republican Economic Committee Chairman Silayev shaking hands with European Commission President Jacques Delors, November 18, 1991

On 28 August 1991, a Supreme Soviet temporarily gave the COMSE the same authority as the Cabinet of Ministers, and Silayev became the Soviet Union's de facto Premier. The Russian-dominated COMSE was quickly surpassed in authority by the Inter-republican Economic Committee (IEC), which was better thought to work between the different member republics, as its function was to coordinate economic policy across the Soviet Union, and was created by law on 5 September, but members were not immediately selected. Silayev finally also became IEC's chairman on 20 September (while other members were different from COMSE), formally strengthening his position in the union, but he presided over a quickly disintegrating Soviet Union and was dismissed as Russian Premier only a few days later. Further disintegration of the USSR, with several republics becoming independent states, led to the transformation of the IEC into the Interstate Economic Committee of the Economic Community on 14 November, which was to coordinate relations between the union republics and the republics that seceded from the USSR. Silayev remained chairman of the new IEC and was considered "Prime Minister of the Economic Community", although the office and the community had no future, with the dissolution of the Soviet Union coming only weeks later.

When he first took office, holding the Russian premiership under Boris Yeltsin at the same time, Silayev had wanted to reduce the powers of the central government and give more powers to the Soviet Republics. As he, however, saw Yeltsin's rapid actions to undermine the institutions of the Soviet Union, his view changed and he demanded that Yeltsin give back much of the authority of the central government which he had usurped following the August Coup. In this he failed, and his position as Russian SFSR Premier was severely weakened as a result, with him being replaced only a month after his accession to the Soviet premiership. Oleg Lobov, Silayev's First Deputy Premier, led the anti-Silayev faction in the Russian SFSR Council of Ministers and managed to oust him on 26 September 1991; Lobov succeeded him as acting Premier of the Russian SFSR. Silayev, as overseer of the economy, was given the task of initiating economic reforms in the Soviet Union in a way that suited both the central government and the Soviet republics. Silayev tried to maintain an integrated economy while initiating the marketisation of the economy. On 19 December 1991, Yeltsin declared the COMSE committee, which served as the Soviet Union's last government, dissolved, and Silayev retired from his post, one day after he had been appointed to his new position as a diplomat for Russia. The legality of the dissolution was unclear, as Gorbachev had not concurred with it, and so most members remained in office and continued their work. Оn 25 December 1991, Gorbachev announced his resignation from the post of President of the USSR in connection with the creation of the Commonwealth of Independent States, meaning that the union government ceased to exist.

== Later career and death ==
On 18 December 1991, Silayev was appointed by Yeltsin as the Permanent Representative of Russia to the European Community in Brussels; he resigned from this post on 7 February 1994. In late 1994, Silayev became the President of the Machine-Building Association of the Commonwealth of Independent States (CIS), which consisted of more than a hundred civilian and military enterprises and associations, mostly of Russian origin. He became a member of the Ecological Movement "Cedar" in 1995. From 1998, he was President of Industrial Machine, an industrial and financial group; he simultaneously headed the National Committee, which promotes economic cooperation with Latin America. On 26 September 2002, Silayev became Chairman of the Russian Union of Mechanical Engineers. During the 2007 legislative election, Silayev ran as a candidate for the Agrarian Party, but failed to get elected.

Silayev died on 8 February 2023, at the age of 92 in Nizhny Novgorod. He was buried on February 11, 2023, at the Troyekurovskoye Cemetery in Moscow next to his wife, who died on 18 March 2006. The farewell ceremony was attended by 30 to 40 people.

== Recognition ==
Silayev was awarded an Order of Lenin on two different occasions—once in 1971, and another during a closed session of the Presidium of the Supreme Soviet in 1975, when he was also awarded a Hero of Socialist Labour. He was awarded a Lenin Prize in 1972. In 1981, he was awarded the Order of the October Revolution and in 2002, the National Prize of Peter the Great. On 19 October 2000 and on 21 October 2005, Silayev was awarded the Diploma of the Government of the Russian Federation.

== General and cited references ==
- Shevchenko, Iulia (2004). The Central Government of Russia: From Gorbachev to Putin. Aldershot, UK: Ashgate Publishing. ISBN 978-0-7546-3982-4.

Political offices
Preceded by Alexander Vlasov	Premier of the Russian SFSR; 15 June 1990 – 26 September 1991	Succeeded by Oleg Lobov (acting)
Preceded by Vitaly Doguzhiyev (acting)	Premier of the Soviet Union; 28 August 1991 – 19 December 1991	Succeeded by Post abolished
