= Molotov's Second Government =

Government of the Soviet Union

Molotov's Second government
- 8th government of the Soviet Union

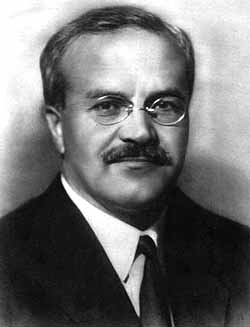
- Date formed: 18 March 1931
- Date dissolved: 2 August 1935

People and organisations
- Head of state: Mikhail Kalinin
- Head of government: Vyacheslav Molotov
- Deputy head of government: Valerian Kuibyshev
- No. of ministers: 29

History
- Predecessor: Molotov I
- Successor: Molotov III

The Second Government of Molotov was the cabinet of the Soviet Union established on March 18, 1931, with Vyacheslav Molotov as the head of government, serving as the President of the Council of People's Commissars.

It ended on August 2, 1935, when the Central Executive Committee of the Soviet Union approved a new composition of the Sovnarkom.

== Composition ==
People's Commissar	Incumbent	Party
Chairman	Vyacheslav Molotov	CPSU (b)
First Deputy Chairman	Valerian Kuibyshev	CPSU (b)
Vice Chairmen	Janis Rudzutaks	CPSU (b)
Vice Chairmen	Valerian Kuibyshev	CPSU (b)
Vice Chairmen	Valery Mezhlauk	CPSU (b)
Vice Chairmen	Vlas Chubar	CPSU (b)
Vice Chairmen	Andrei Andreyev	CPSU (b)
People's Commissar for Affairs	Platon Kerzhentsev (1931–1933)	CPSU (b)
People's Commissar for Affairs	Ivan Miroshnikov (1933–1935)	CPSU (b)
Foreign Affairs	Maksim Litvinov	CPSU (b)
Military and Naval Affairs (1931-1934)	Kliment Voroshilov	CPSU (b)
Defense (1934-1935)	Kliment Voroshilov	CPSU (b)
External Trade	Arkadi Rozengoltz	CPSU (b)
Supply (1931-1934)	Anastas Mikoyan	CPSU (b)
Food Industry (1933-1935)	Anastas Mikoyan	CPSU (b)
Domestic Trade	Izrail Veytser	CPSU (b)
Railways	Moisey Rukhimovich (1931)	CPSU (b)
Railways	Andrei Andreyev (1931–1935)	CPSU (b)
Posts and Telegraphs (1931–1932)	Aleksei Rykov	CPSU (b)
Communications (1932-1935)	Aleksei Rykov	CPSU (b)
Supreme Council of National Economy (1931–1932)	Sergei Ordzhonikidze	CPSU (b)
Heavy Industry (1932–1935)	Sergei Ordzhonikidze	CPSU (b)
Forestry	Semyon Lobov	CPSU (b)
Light Industry	Isidor Lyubimov	CPSU (b)
Labor	Anton Tsikhon	CPSU (b)
Inspection of Workers and Peasants	Andrei Andreyev (1931)	CPSU (b)
Inspection of Workers and Peasants	Janis Rudzutaks (1931–1934)	C PSU (b)
Finance	Grigori Grinko	CPSU (b)
Agriculture	Yakov Yakovlev (1931–1934)	CPSU (b)
Agriculture	Mikhail Chernov (1934–1935)	CPSU (b)
Water Transport	Nikolai Janson (1931–1934)	CPSU (b)
Water Transport	Nikolai Pakhomov (1934–1935)	CPSU (b)
Cereal and Livestock Sovkhozes	Tikhon Yurikin (1932–1934)	CPSU (b)
Cereal and Livestock Sovkhozes	Moisei Kalmanovich (1934–1935)	CPSU (b)
Internal Affairs	Genrikh Yagoda	CPSU (b)
