= Shcherbak =

Shcherbak (Georgian: შჩერბაკ, Russian: Шчербак) is a Ukrainian-language surname. Shcherba (Щерба) is a Ukrainian term for certain kinds of soup and is related to the Persian word "shorba" with the same meaning.

The name is most prevalent in Ukraine, where 17,275 people had the surname Shcherbak in 2014.

Notable people with the surname include:

- Denis Shcherbak
- Dmytro Shcherbak
- Oksana Shcherbak
- Vladimir Shcherbak:
  - Vladimir Shcherbak (footballer, born 1970)
  - Vladimir Shcherbak (footballer, born 1959)
  - Vladimir Shcherbak (politician)
- Yuriy Shcherbak

== See also ==
- Shcherba
- Shcherbakov (disambiguation)
