= International Union of Economists =

Non-governmental organization

The International Union of Economists (IUE) is a non-governmental organization that promotes global economic progress. The IUE is composed of economists and other representatives from 48 countries around the world. Headquartered in Moscow, Russia, the IUE was established in 1991 and received general consultative status with the United Nations Economic and Social Council in 1999. The organization is affiliated with UNESCO and the United Nations Conference on Trade and Development, and receives support from the Russian government.
