= Molotov's Third Government =

Government of the Soviet Union

Third Government of Vyacheslav Molotov
- 9th government of the Soviet Union

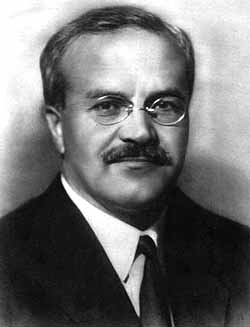
- Date formed: 2 August 1935
- Date dissolved: 5 December 1936

People and organisations
- Head of government: Vyacheslav Molotov
- No. of ministers: 56
- Opposition party: CPSU

History
- Election: 1935 Soviet Union legislative election
- Outgoing election: 1936 Soviet Union legislative election
- Incoming formation: Congress of Soviets VII
- Outgoing formation: Supreme Soviet I
- Predecessor: Molotov II
- Successor: Molotov IV

The Third Molotov Government was the cabinet of the Soviet Union established on August 2, 1935 with Vyacheslav Molotov as head of government, serving as president of the Council of People's Commissars.

It ended on December 5, 1936, when the Central Executive Committee of the Soviet Union approved a new composition of the Sovnarkom.

== Composition ==
| People's Commissar | Title | Party |
|---|---|---|
| Chairman of the Council of Ministers | Vyacheslav Molotov | PCU (b) |
| Administrator of Affairs | Ivan Miroshnikov | PCU (b) |
| Vice Chairmen | Nikolai Antipov | PCU (b) |
| Vice Chairmen | Valery Mezhlauk | PCU (b) |
| Vice Chairmen | Janis Rudzutaks | PCU (b) |
| Vice Chairmen | Vlas Chubar | PCU (b) |
| Foreign Affairs | Maksim Litvinov | PCU (b) |
| Defense | Kliment Voroshilov | PCU (b) |
| Foreign Trade | Arkadi Rozengoltz | PCU (b) |
| Food Industry | Anastas Mikoyan | PCU (b) |
| Internal Trade | Israel Weitzer | PCU (b) |
| Railways | Andrey Andreyev (1935) | PCU (b) |
| Railways | Lazar Kaganovich (1935-1936) | PCU (b) |
| Communications | Alexei Rykov (1935-1936) | PCU (b) |
| Communications | Genrikh Yagoda (1936) | PCU (b) |
| Heavy Industry | Sergo Ordzhonikidze | PCU (b) |
| Finance | Grigori Grinko | PCU (b) |
| Agriculture | Mikhail Chernov | PCU (b) |
| Water Transport | Nikolai Pajomov | PCU (b) |
| Grain and Livestock Farms | Moisey Kalmanovich | PCU (b) |
| Internal Affairs | Genrikh Yagoda (1935-1936) | PCU (b) |
| Internal Affairs | Nikolai Yezhov (1936) | PCU (b) |
| Forest Industry | Semyon Lobov (1935-1936) | PCU (b) |
| Forest Industry | Vladimir Ivanov (1936) | PCU (b) |
| Light Industry | Isidoro Liubimov | PCU (b) |
