= Vladimir Shcherbakov (footballer) =

Soviet footballer

Personal information
- Full name: Vladimir Aleksandrovich Shcherbakov
- Date of birth: 1945
- Place of birth: Moscow, USSR
- Date of death: 1993 (aged 47–48)
- Place of death: Moscow, Russia
- Position: Striker

Senior career*
Years	Team	Apps	(Gls)
1963	CSKA Moscow		
1964–1968	FC Torpedo Moscow		
1968–1969	CSKA Moscow		
1970–1971	Politotdel Tashkent Oblast		
1972	FC Shinnik Yaroslavl		

International career
1965	USSR	1	(0)
- * Club domestic league appearances and goals

Vladimir Aleksandrovich Shcherbakov (Russian: Владимир Александрович Щербаков; 1945 in Moscow – 1993 in Moscow) was a Soviet football player, best known for his time playing as a midfielder for several Soviet clubs, as well as his brief international career representing the USSR.

== Early life and career ==
Shcherbakov was born in Moscow in 1945, and from an early age, he showed an aptitude for football. He began his youth career in local clubs before moving to a professional football career in the Soviet Union. His early training and experience helped him stand out as a promising talent in Soviet football.

== Club career ==
Shcherbakov spent the majority of his playing career with Dynamo Moscow, one of the most successful and prestigious football clubs in the Soviet Union. During his time with the club, he was part of a team that achieved significant domestic success, including winning the Soviet Top League title in 1965. He was known for his skillful play in midfield, combining both defensive and attacking responsibilities.

Throughout his career, Shcherbakov also played for other clubs, contributing his experience and technical ability to every team he joined. His consistent performances on the pitch made him a well-respected figure in Soviet football.

== Honours ==
- Soviet Top League winner: 1965.

== International career ==
Shcherbakov's international career was short but notable. He earned a single cap for the USSR on 4 September 1965 in a friendly against Yugoslavia. Though he had limited opportunities to represent the national team, his inclusion for that match was a significant achievement in his career.

== Death ==
Vladimir Shcherbakov died in 1993 in Moscow.
