= List of ministries of the Soviet Union =

List of ministries of the Soviet Union contains all national-level ministries in the Soviet Union over time, broken down chronologically.

== List ==
Agency	Established	Disestablished	Lifespan	First head	Last head
Tractors and Agricultural Machines	2 October 1965	19 October 1988	23 years, 17 days		
Agriculture	8 December 1929	18 November 1985	55 years, 345 days		
Agriculture and Food	2 March 1991	28 August 1991	179 days		
Agriculture and Procurement	15 March 1953	21 November 1953	251 days		
Animal Husbandry	26 March 1946	4 February 1947	315 days		
Armaments	8 December 1936	6 March 1953	16 years, 88 days		
Assembly and Special Construction Works	2 October 1965	26 November 1991	26 years, 55 days	Fuad Jakubowski	Alexander Mikhalchenko
Armed Forces	25 February 1946	25 February 1950	4 years, 0 days	Joseph Stalin	Aleksandr Vasilevsky
Atomic Energy and Industry	17 July 1989	26 November 1991	2 years, 132 days		
Atomic Energy	9 September 1986	17 July 1989	2 years, 38 days		
Automobile and Agricultural Machinery	2 December 1988	26 November 1991	2 years, 359 days		
Automobile Industry	2 October 1965	2 October 1988	23 years, 0 days		
Automobile Industry	19 April 1954	10 May 1957	2 years, 91 days		
Automobile Industry	17 February 1946	15 March 1953	7 years, 26 days		
Automobile and Road Transport	19 March 1953	31 May 1956	3 years, 73 days		
Aviation Industry	2 October 1965	24 August 1991	25 years, 326 days		
Aviation Industry	11 January 1939	14 December 1957	18 years, 337 days		
Grain Products	26 July 1974	17 July 1989	14 years, 356 days	Grigori Zolotukhin	Aleksandr Budyka
Procurement of Agricultural Products	21 November 1953	26 October 1958	4 years, 341 days	Leonid Kornijec	Leonid Kornijec
Procurement of Agricultural Products	15 January 1938	15 March 1953	15 years, 59 days	Mikhail Popov	Panteleimon Ponomarenko
Chemical and Oil Refining Industry	17 July 1989	24 September 1990	1 year, 69 days	Nikolai Lemayev	Nikolai Lemayev
Oil Processing & Petrochemical Industry	2 October 1965	17 July 1989	23 years, 288 days	Viktor Fjodorov	Nikolai Lemayev
Chemical Industry	2 October 1965	17 July 1989	23 years, 288 days	Leonid Kostandov	Juri Bespalov
Chemical Industry	24 January 1939	9 June 1958	19 years, 136 days	Mikhail Denisov	Sergei Tikhomirov
Building of Military and Naval Enterprises	19 March 1946	9 March 1949	3 years, 49 days	Semjon Ginsburg	Nikolai Dygai
Building Materials Industry	2 October 1965	17 July 1989	23 years, 288 days	Ivan Grishmanov	Sergei Voyenushkin
Building Materials Industry	24 January 1939	4 July 1957	18 years, 161 days	Leonid Sosnin	Lazar Kaganovich
Cellulose and Paper Industry	3 July 1968	30 October 1980	12 years, 141 days	Konstantin Galantshin	Konstantin Galantshin
Civil Aviation	28 July 1964	26 November 1991	27 years, 121 days	Yevgeni Loginov	Boris Panjukov
Coal Industry	2 October 1965	26 November 1991	26 years, 55 days	Boris Bratshenko	Mikhail Shchadov
Coal Industry	28 December 1948	2 March 1957	8 years, 133 days	Aleksandr Zasyadko	Aleksandr Zademidko
Coal Industry	12 October 1939	19 January 1946	6 years, 99 days	Vasili Vakhrushev	Vasili Vakhrushev
Communication Equipment Industry	11 April 1974	17 July 1989	15 years, 97 days	Erien Pervyshin	Erien Pervyshin
Communications	6 July 1923	26 November 1991	68 years, 172 days	Valerian Dovgalevsky	Gennady Kudryavtsev
Communications Industry	28 June 1946	5 March 1953	6 years, 250 days	Ivan Zubovich	Gennady Aleksenko
Construction and Road-Machine Building	2 October 1965	17 July 1989	23 years, 288 days	Jefim Novosjelov	Jevgeni Varnachev
Construction and Road-Machine Building	19 April 1954	10 May 1957	3 years, 21 days	Jefim Novosjelov	Jefim Novosjelov
Construction and Road-Machine Building	17 February 1946	5 March 1953	7 years, 16 days	Konstantin Sokolov	Semjon Fomin
Construction	21 February 1967	2 September 1986	19 years, 193 days	Georgi Karavajev	Vladimir Reshetilov
Construction	15 March 1953	10 May 1957	4 years, 56 days	Nikolai Dygai	Nikolai Dygai
Construction	16 June 1939	19 January 1946	6 years, 217 days	Semjon Ginzburg	Semjon Ginzburg
Construction in the Eastern Regions	2 September 1986	17 July 1989	2 years, 318 days	Aleksandr Babenko	Aleksandr Babenko
Construction in Far East and Transbaikal Regions	19 January 1946	2 September 1986	6 years, 258 days	Sergei Bashilov	Aleksandr Babenko
Construction in the Northern and Western Regions	2 September 1986	17 July 1989	2 years, 318 days	Vladimir Reshetilov	Vladimir Reshetilov
Construction in the Southern Regions	2 September 1986	17 July 1989	2 years, 318 days	Arkadi Shchepetilnikov	Arkadi Shchepetilnikov
Construction in the Urals and West Sibirian Regions	2 September 1986	17 July 1989	2 years, 318 days	Sergei Bashilov	Sergei Bashilov
Construction of Coal Industry	6 April 1955	10 May 1957	2 years, 34 days	Leonid Melnikov	Leonid Melnikov
Construction of Fuel Industry	16 January 1946	28 December 1948	2 years, 344 days	Nikolai Zademidko	Nikolai Zademidko
Construction of Heavy Industry	21 February 1967	2 September 1986	19 years, 193 days	Nikolai Goldin	Sergei Bashilov
Construction of Heavy Industry	16 January 1946	15 March 1953	7 years, 55 days	Pavel Yudin	David Raizer
Construction of Industrial Plants	19 January 1946	15 March 1946	15 years, 97 days	Semjon Ginzburg	Semjon Ginzburg
Construction of Machine-Building Enterprises	9 March 1949	15 March 1953	4 years, 6 days	Nikolai Dygai	Nikolai Dygai
Construction of Metallurgical and Chemical Industry	19 April 1954	9 September 1957	3 years, 143 days	David Raizer	David Raizer
Construction of Power Plants	26 May 1975	27 September 1985	10 years, 124 days	Viktor Krotov	Vladimir Velichko
Construction of Power Plants	8 February 1955	10 May 1957	2 years, 91 days	Fjodor Loginov	Fjodor Loginov
Construction of Oil and Gas Industry	20 September 1972	26 November 1991	19 years, 85 days	Mikhail Jevsejenko	Boris Shcherbina
Construction of Oil Industry	10 February 1955	10 May 1957	2 years, 89 days	Aleksei Kortunov	Vladimir Chirskov
Construction of Tool-Machines	2 October 1965	27 September 1985	19 years, 360 days	Anatoli Kostousov	Boris Balmont
Construction of Tool-Machines	19 April 1954	10 May 1957	3 years, 21 days	Anatoli Kostousov	Anatoli Kostousov
Construction of Tool-Machines	16 January 1946	15 March 1953	7 years, 46 days	Aleksandr Yefremov	Anatoli Kostousov
Cotton Growing	5 April 1950	15 March 1953	2 years, 348 days	Usman Yusupov	Usman Yusupov
Culture	15 March 1953	27 November 1991	38 years, 257 days	Panteleimon Ponomarenko	Nikolai Gubenko
Defense	15 March 1953	26 December 1991	38 years, 286 days	Nikolai Bulganin	Yevgeny Shaposhnikov
Defense	20 April 1934	25 February 1946	11 years, 311 days	Kliment Voroshilov	Joseph Stalin
Defense Industry	2 October 1965	26 November 1991	26 years, 55 days	Sergei Sverov	Boris Belousov
Defense Industry	6 March 1953	14 December 1957	4 years, 283 days	Dmitry Ustinov	Dmitry Ustinov
Economy and Forecasting	16 May 1991	26 December 1991	224 days	Vladimir Scherbakov	Vladimir Scherbakov
Education	24 December 1966	8 March 1988	21 years, 75 days	Mikhail Prokofiev	Sergei Shcherbakov
Electrotechnical Industry	17 April 1954	10 May 1957	2 years, 266 days	Ivan Skidanenko	Ivan Kabanov
Electrotechnical Industry	17 August 1940	8 March 1988	47 years, 204 days	Vasili Bogatyrjev	Ivan Kabanov
Electrical Engineering	2 October 1965	26 November 1991	26 years, 55 days	Aleksei Antonov	Oleg Anfimov
Electrical Equipment Industry	2 October 1965	26 November 1991	26 years, 55 days	Aleksei Antonov	Oleg Anfimov
Electrical Industry	2 October 1965	26 November 1991	26 years, 55 days	Ivan Kabanov	Dmitri Yefremov
Electronics Industry	2 October 1965	18 November 1985	20 years, 47 days	Aleksandr Shokin	Vladislav Kolesnikov
Energy and Electrification	25 April 1962	11 April 1984	21 years, 109 days	Ignati Novikov	Pjotr Neporozhny
Environment and Environmental Protection	20 March 1991	24 August 1991	157 days	Nikolai Vorontzov	Nikolai Vorontzov
Stock Farming	26 March 1946	4 February 1947	315 days	Aleksei Kozlov	Aleksei Kozlov
State Farms	4 February 1947	30 May 1957	10 years, 115 days	Nikolai Skvorcov	Ivan Benediktov
State Farms	1 January 1931	11 November 1945	14 years, 314 days	Tikhon Turkin	Pavel Lobanov
Ferrous Metallurgy	2 October 1965	26 July 1974	8 years, 297 days	Ivan Kazanetz	Ivan Kazanetz
Ferrous Metallurgy	8 February 1954	10 May 1957	3 years, 91 days	Anatoli Kuzmin	Aleksandr Sherementjev
Ferrous Metallurgy	28 December 1950	6 March 1953	2 years, 68 days	Ivan Tevosian	Ivan Tevosian
Ferrous Metallurgy	24 January 1939	29 July 1948	9 years, 187 days	Fjodor Merkulov	Ivan Tevosian
Finance	6 July 1923	26 November 1991	68 years, 172 days	Grigori Sokolnikov	Vladimir Orlov
Fishing Economy	19 January 1939	15 March 1946	7 years, 55 days	Polina Zhemtshuzhina	Aleksandr Ishkov
Fishing Industry	2 October 1965	26 November 1991	26 years, 55 days	Aleksandr Ishkov	Nikolai Kotlyar
Fishing Industry	19 March 1946	10 May 1957	11 years, 52 days	Aleksandr Ishkov	Aleksandr Ishkov
Food Industry	15 October 1964	24 August 1991	20 years, 99 days	Vasili Zotov	Voldemar Lein
Food Industry	24 August 1953	10 May 1957	3 years, 259 days	Vasili Zotov	Vasili Zotov
Food Industry	29 March 1934	15 March 1953	18 years, 351 days	Anastas Mikoyan	Ivan Sivolap
Reserves of Food and Material	4 May 1946	26 November 1951	5 years, 207 days	Dmitri Fomin	Dmitri Fomin
Foreign Affairs	6 July 1923	14 November 1991	68 years, 160 days	Georgy Chicherin	Boris Pankin
External Relations	19 November 1991	26 December 1991	37 days	Eduard Shevardnadze	Eduard Shevardnadze
Foreign Economic Relations	16 January 1988	26 December 1991	3 years, 344 days	Konstantin Katushev	Valeri Mangasejev
Foreign Trade	6 July 1923	16 January 1988	64 years, 223 days	Leonid Krasin	Boris Aristov
Commerce and Foreign Trade	15 March 1953	15 September 1953	184 days	Anastas Mikoyan	Anastas Mikoyan
Forestry Industry	17 July 1989	24 August 1991	2 years, 38 days	Vladimir Melnikov	Vladimir Melnikov
Forestry Industry	4 April 1945	15 March 1953	7 years, 345 days	German Motovilov	Aleksandr Bovin
Forestry, Pulp, Paper and Woodworking	2 October 1965	11 June 1968	2 years, 253 days	Nikolai Timofjejev	Nikolai Timofjejev
Timber Industry	16 February 1951	13 July 1957	6 years, 147 days	Georgi Orlov	Georgi Orlov
Timber Industry	5 January 1932	24 July 1948	16 years, 201 days	Semjon Lobov	Georgi Orlov
Fruits and Vegetables	19 December 1980	22 November 1985	4 years, 338 days	Nikolai Koslov	Nikolai Koslov
Gas Industry	2 October 1965	22 November 1985	23 years, 288 days	Aleksei Kortunov	Viktor Chernomyrdin
General Machine Building	2 October 1965	26 November 1991	26 years, 55 days	Sergey Afanasyev	Oleg Shishkin
General Machine Building	2 April 1955	10 May 1957	2 years, 38 days	Pyotr Goremykin	Pyotr Goremykin
Geology	2 October 1965	1 December 1991	26 years, 60 days	Aleksandr Sidorenko	Grigori Gabrijeljants
Geology	14 June 1946	15 March 1953	6 years, 274 days	Ivan Malyshev	Pyotr Zakharov
Geology and Conservation	31 August 1953	13 March 1963	9 years, 194 days	Pyotr Antropov	Aleksandr Sidorenko
Health	20 July 1934	26 November 1991	57 years, 129 days	Grigory Kaminsky	Igor Denisov
Heavy Machine Building	17 July 1989	1 April 1991	1 year, 258 days	Vladimir Zhigalin	Vladimir Velichko
Heavy Machine Building	19 June 1954	10 May 1957	2 years, 325 days	Nikolai Kazakov	Konstantin Petukhov
Heavy Machine Building	19 June 1939	6 March 1953	13 years, 260 days	Vyacheslav Malyshev	Nikolai Kazakov
Heavy and Transport Construction	2 October 1965	28 May 1975	19 years, 238 days	Vladimir Zhigalin	Vladimir Zhigalin
Heavy, Power and Transport Construction	28 May 1975	20 July 1987	12 years, 53 days	Vladimir Zhigalin	Sergey Afanasyev
Higher Education	9 March 1954	22 June 1959	5 years, 105 days	Vyacheslav Yeljutin	Vyacheslav Yeljutin
Higher Education	10 April 1946	15 March 1953	6 years, 339 days	Nikolai Kaftanov	Vsevolod Stoletov
Higher and Secondary Special Education	22 June 1959	8 March 1988	28 years, 260 days	Vyacheslav Yeljutin	Gennady Yagodin
Industrial Consumer Goods	24 August 1953	8 February 1955	1 year, 167 days	Alexei Kosygin	Nikita Ryzhov
Industrial Consumer Goods	15 July 1946	20 January 1949	2 years, 189 days	Nikolai Pronin	Nikolai Pronin
Industrial Construction	21 February 1967	2 September 1986	19 years, 193 days	Aleksandr Tokarjev	Arkadi Shchepetilnikov
Information and the Press	13 July 1991	26 November 1991	136 days	Mikhail Nenashev	Mikhail Nenashev
Instrumentation, Automation and Control Systems	2 October 1965	17 July 1989	23 years, 288 days	Konstantin Rudnev	Mikhail Shkabardnya
Instrument Making and Automation Equipment	21 January 1956	10 May 1957	1 year, 109 days	Mikhail Lesechko	Mikhail Lesechko
Internal Affairs	25 November 1968	26 December 1991	23 years, 41 days	Nikolai Shchelokov	Viktor Barannikov
Internal Affairs	11 May 1934	13 January 1960	25 years, 247 days	Genrikh Yagoda	Nikolai Dudorov
Justice	1 September 1970	26 November 1991	21 years, 86 days	Vladimir Terebilov	Sergei Lushchikov
Justice	20 July 1936	31 May 1956	19 years, 316 days	Nikolai Krylenko	Konstantin Gorshenin
Meat and Dairy Industry	2 October 1965	22 November 1985	20 years, 51 days	Sergei Antonov	Jevgeni Sizenko
Meat and Dairy Industry	17 April 1954	10 May 1957	3 years, 23 days	Sergei Antonov	Sergei Antonov
Meat and Dairy Industry	19 January 1939	25 March 1953	14 years, 65 days	Pavel Smirnov	Ivan Kuzminykh
Paper and Wood Processing Industry	19 April 1954	10 May 1957	3 years, 21 days	Fjodor Varaksin	Fjodor Varaksin
Paper and Wood Processing Industry	16 February 1951	15 March 1953	2 years, 27 days	Ivan Voronov	Ivan Voronov
Public Order	17 September 1966	25 November 1968	3 years, 59 days	Nikolai Shchelokov	Nikolai Shchelokov
Labour and Social Affairs	26 March 1991	26 November 1991	245 days	Valery Paulman	Valery Paulman
Labour Reserves	1946	1953	245 days	Valery Paulman	Valery Paulman
Land Reclamation and Water Management	2 October 1965	14 January 1991	25 years, 104 days	Yevgeni Aleksejevski	Nikolai Vasiljev
Light Industry	2 October 1965	24 August 1953	23 years, 194 days	Nikolai Tarasov	Vladimir Klyuyev
Light Industry	22 September 1955	31 May 1956	252 days	Nikolai Mirovortsev	Nikita Ryzhov
Light Industry	5 January 1932	6 March 1953	21 years, 60 days	Isidor Lyubimov	Alexei Kosygin
Light- and Food Industry	6 March 1953	24 August 1953	171 days	Alexei Kosygin	Alexei Kosygin
Machine-Tool and Tool Industry	1965	1991	171 days	?	?
Machine-Tool and Tool Industry	1957	1954	171 days	?	?
Machine-Tool Building	1947	1953	171 days	?	?
Material Resources	13 July 1991	26 November 1991	136 days	Stanislav Anisimov	Stanislav Anisimov
Material Reserves	1946	1948	136 days	?	?
Machine Building	5 February 1968	17 July 1991	23 years, 162 days	Vyacheslav Bakhirov	Boris Belousov
Machine Building	24 August 1937	10 May 1957	19 years, 259 days	Valery Mezhlauk	Nikolai Smelyakov
Machine Building and Instrumentation	1954	1956	2 years, 136 days	?	?
Machine Building and Instrumentation	1946	1953	7 years, 136 days	?	?
Machine Building and Livestock and Fodder Production	1954	1956	2 years, 136 days	?	?
Machine Building for Light and Food Industries	1 October 1965	1 March 1988	2 years, 152 days	Vasili Doyenin	Lev Vasiljev
Maritime Fleet	28 August 1954	26 November 1991	37 years, 90 days	Viktor Bakaev	Yuri Volmer
Maritime Fleet	19 March 1946	15 March 1953	6 years, 361 days	Pyotr Shirshov	Nikolai Novikov
Maritime Fleet	30 January 1931	9 April 1939	8 years, 68 days	Nikolai Yanson	Nikolai Yezhov
Medium Machine Building	2 March 1965	17 July 1989	24 years, 137 days	Yefim Slavski	Lev Ryabev
Medium Machine Building	17 July 1953	13 March 1963	9 years, 239 days	Yefim Slavski	Yefim Slavski
Medium Machine Building	5 February 1939	17 February 1946	7 years, 12 days	Ivan Likhachev	Stepan Akopov
Medical Industry	27 June 1989	1 April 1991	1 year, 278 days	Valery Bykov	Valery Bykov
Medical Industry	25 April 1967	22 September 1985	18 years, 150 days	Pyotr Gusenko	Afanasi Melnitshenko
Medical Industry	14 June 1946	1 March 1948	1 year, 261 days	Andrei Tretjakov	Andrei Tretjakov
Medical and Microbiological Industry	21 November 1985	27 June 1989	3 years, 218 days	Valery Bykov	Valery Bykov
Metallurgy	17 July 1989	26 November 1991	2 years, 132 days	Serafim Kolpakov	Oleg Soskovetz
Metallurgical Industry	29 July 1948	8 February 1954	5 years, 194 days	Ivan Tervosyan	Ivan Tervosyan
Military Affairs	25 February 1950	15 March 1953	3 years, 18 days	Aleksandr Vasilevsky	Aleksandr Vasilevsky
Military and Navy Affairs	6 July 1923	20 April 1934	10 years, 288 days	Leon Trotsky	Kliment Voroshilov
Non-Ferrous Metallurgy	2 October 1965	17 July 1989	23 years, 288 days	Pyotr Lomako	Vladimir Durasov
Non-Ferrous Metallurgy	8 February 1954	10 May 1957	3 years, 91 days	Pyotr Lomako	Pyotr Lomako
Non-Ferrous Metallurgy	28 December 1950	6 March 1953	2 years, 68 days	Pyotr Lomako	Pyotr Lomako
Non-Ferrous Metallurgy	24 January 1939	29 June 1948	9 years, 157 days	Aleksandr Samokhvalov	Pyotr Lomako
Timber and Wood Processing Industry	3 July 1968	30 October 1980	12 years, 109 days	Nikolai Timofjejev	Nikolai Timofjejev

=== O ===
- Ministry of Oil and Gas Industry of the USSR (Minneftegazprom) (1989–1991)
  - Ministry of Oil Industry of the USSR (Minnefteprom) (1948–1957); (1970–1989)
    - Ministry of Oil Industry of the USSR (Minnefteprom) (1965—1970)
    - Ministry of Oil Refining and Petrochemical Industry of the USSR (Minneftekhimprom) (1965 — 27.06.1989)
      - Ministry of Petroleum Industry of the Eastern USSR (1946–1948)
      - Ministry of Petroleum Industry of the South and West of the USSR (1946–1948)

=== P ===
- Ministry of the Paper and Woodworking Industry of the USSR (1954–1957)
  - Ministry of Paper and Wood Processing Industry of the USSR (1951—1953)
- Ministry of Power Engineering of the USSR (Minenergomash) (1975–1987)
- Ministry of Power Stations of the USSR (1946–1953); (1954—1958)
  - Ministry of Power and Electrical Industries of the USSR (1953–1954)
- Ministry of Procurement of the USSR (1946–1953); (1953–1956); (1969—1985)
- Ministry of Production of Mineral Fertilizers of the USSR (Minudobreniy) (1980–1989)
- Ministry of Public Order of the USSR (MOOP) (26 July 1966 — 25 November 1968)
- Ministry of Pulp and Paper Industry of the USSR (1968–1980)
  - Ministry of Pulp and Paper Industry of the USSR (1946–1948)

=== R ===
- Ministry of Radio Industry of the USSR (Minradioprom) (1965–1991)
  - Ministry of Radioengineering Industry of the USSR (1954–1957)
- Ministry of Railways of the USSR (MPS) (1946–1992)
- Ministry of Road Transport and Highways of the USSR (Minavtoshoshdor) (1953–1956)
  - Ministry of Automobile Transport of the USSR (Minavtotrans) (1952–1953)
- Ministry of the Rubber Industry of the USSR (Minrezinprom) (1947—1948)
- Ministry of the River Fleet of the USSR (Mirechflot) (1946–1953); (1954–1956)
- Ministry of Rural Construction of the USSR (Minselstroy) (1953); (1967–1985)

=== S ===
- Ministry of Shipbuilding Industry of the USSR (Minsudprom) (1946–1953); (1954–1957); (1965–1991)
- Ministry of Special Construction and Assembly Works of the USSR (1991)
- Ministry of State Control of the USSR (1946—1957)
- Ministry of State Farms of the USSR (1947–1953); (1953–1957)
- Ministry of State Food and Material Reserves (1948–1951)
- Ministry of State Security of the USSR (MGB) (1946—1953)

=== T ===
- Ministry of Textile Industry of the USSR (Mintekstilprom) (1946–1948); (1955—????)
- Ministry of Technical Cultures of the USSR (1946–1947)
- Ministry of Trade of the USSR (Mintorg) (1946–1953); (1953–1958); (1965–1991)
- Ministry of Tractor and Agricultural Machinery of the USSR (Minselkhozmash, MTiSKHM SSSR (1955–1957); (1965–1987)
- Ministry of Transport Engineering of the USSR (Mintransmash) (1946–1953); (1954–1957)
  - Ministry of Transport and Heavy Machine Building of the USSR (1953–1954)
- Ministry of Transport Construction of the USSR (Mintransstroy) (1954—1963); (1965–1991)

=== U ===
- Ministry of Urban and Rural Construction of the USSR (Mingorselstroy) (1954–1957)
  - Ministry of Urban Construction of the USSR (1949—1951)

=== W ===
- Ministry of Water Construction of the USSR (1989—1990)

== Other agencies under the Cabinet of Ministers ==
Name of Agency	Russian
Committee for State Security	Комитет государственной безопасности
State Committee for Procurement of Food Resources	Государственный комитет по закупкам продовольственных ресурсов
State Committee for Forest	Государственный комитет по лесу
State Committee for Machine Building	Государственный комитет по машиностроению
State Committee for Public Education	Государственный комитет по народному образованию
State Committee for Science and Technology	Государственный комитет по науке и технологиям
State Committee for National Issues	Государственный комитет по национальным вопросам
Central Statistical Office	Центральное статистическое управление
State Committee for Construction and Investment	Государственный комитет по строительству и инвестициям
State Committee on Chemistry and Biotechnology	Государственный комитет по химии и биотехнологиям
