= First Ryzhkov Government =

Cabinet of the Soviet Union

First Government of Nikolay Ryzhkov
- Soviet Union; 26th Government of the Soviet Union
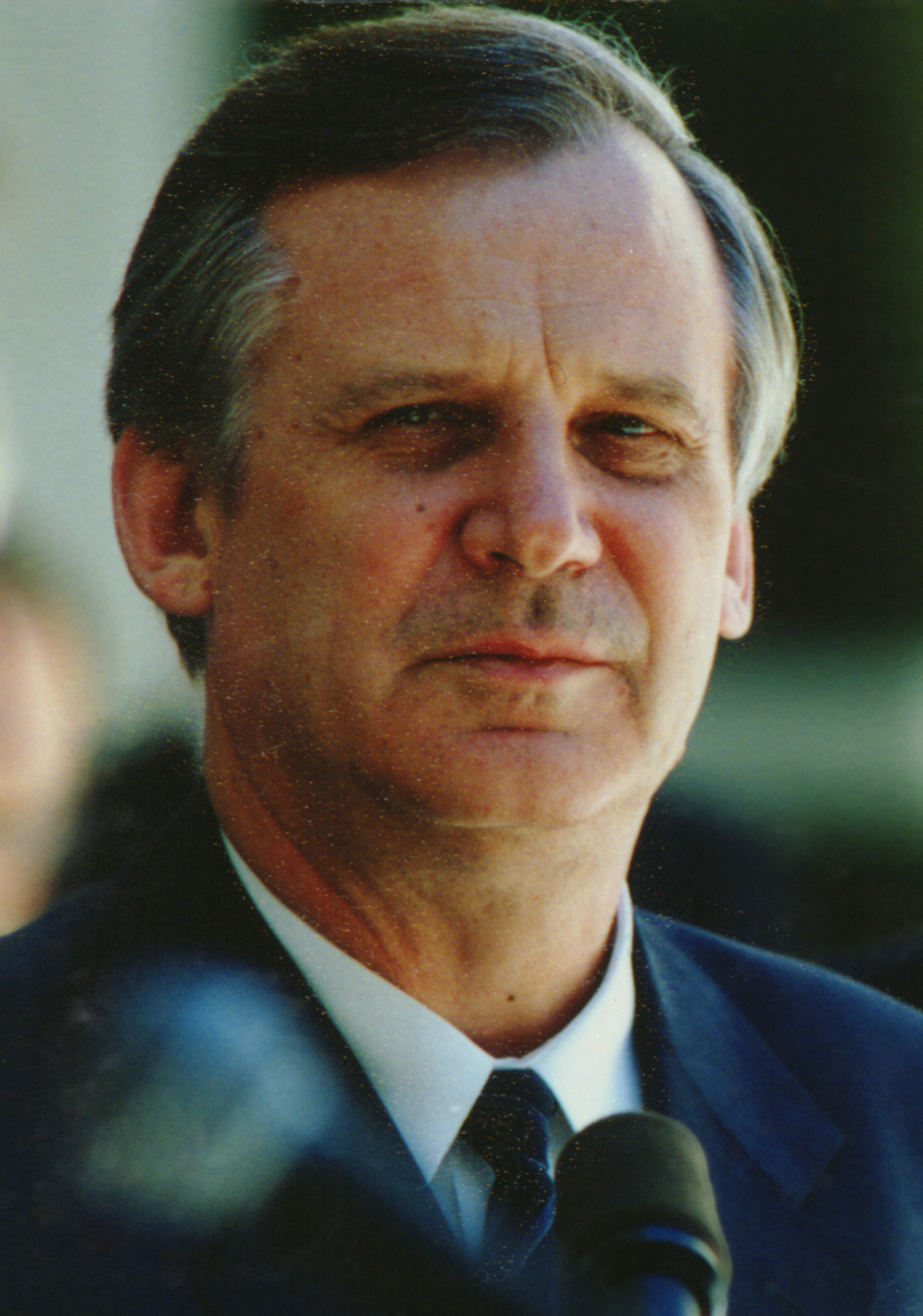
- Date formed: September 27, 1985
- Date dissolved: July 17, 1989

People and organisations
- Chairman of the Presidium of the Supreme Soviet: Andrei Gromyko (until 1 October 1988), Mikhail Gorbachev (from 1 October 1988)
- President of the Sovmin: Nikolay Ryzhkov
- First Deputy Premier of the Soviet Union: Vsevolod Murakhovsky, Ivan Arkhipov (1985–1986), Heydar Aliyev (1985–1987), Nikolay Talyzin (1985–1988, Yuri Maslyukov (1988–1989)
- Member party: All-Union Communist Party (Bolshevik)

History
- Election: 1984 Soviet Union legislative election
- Outgoing election: 1989 Soviet Union legislative election
- Predecessor: Tikhonov's Second Government
- Successor: Ryzhkov's Second Government

The First Ryzhkov Government was the cabinet of the Soviet Union established on 27 September 1985. with Nikolay Ryzhkov as head of government, serving as Chairman of the Council of Ministers. The government was formed during the early perestroika reforms under Mikhail Gorbachev and continued until its reorganization on 7 September 1989.

== Composition ==
| Ministry Name | Name | Party | Ref. |
|---|---|---|---|
| Premier of the Soviet Union | Nikolay Ryzhkov | CPSU | |
| First Deputy Premiers of the Soviet Union | Vsevolod Murakhovsky | CPSU | |
| First Deputy Premiers of the Soviet Union | Ivan Arkhipov (1985–1986) | CPSU | |
| First Deputy Premiers of the Soviet Union | Heydar Aliyev (1985–1987) | CPSU | |
| First Deputy Premiers of the Soviet Union | Nikolay Talyzin (1985–1988) | CPSU | |
| First Deputy Premiers of the Soviet Union | Yuri Maslyukov (1988–1989) | CPSU | |
| Deputy Chairmen of the Council of Ministers | Yury Batalin | CPSU | |
| Deputy Chairmen of the Council of Ministers | Lev Voronin | CPSU | |
| Deputy Chairmen of the Council of Ministers | Boris Shcherbina | CPSU | |
| Deputy Chairmen of the Council of Ministers | Ivan Silayev | CPSU | |
| Deputy Chairmen of the Council of Ministers | Venyamin Dymshits (1985) | CPSU | |
| Deputy Chairmen of the Council of Ministers | Nikolai Baibakov (1985) | CPSU | |
| Deputy Chairmen of the Council of Ministers | Nikolay Talyzin (1985–1986) | CPSU | |
| Deputy Chairmen of the Council of Ministers | Alexey Antonov (1985–1988) | CPSU | |
| Deputy Chairmen of the Council of Ministers | Yakov Ryabov (1985–1986) | CPSU | |
| Deputy Chairmen of the Council of Ministers | Yury Marchuk (1985–1986) | CPSU | |
| Deputy Chairmen of the Council of Ministers | Nikolay Martinov (1985) | CPSU | |
| Deputy Chairmen of the Council of Ministers | Yuri Maslyukov (1985–1988) | CPSU | |
| Deputy Chairmen of the Council of Ministers | Alexey Antonov (1985) | CPSU | |
| Deputy Chairmen of the Council of Ministers | Ziya Nuriyev (1985) | CPSU | |
| Deputy Chairmen of the Council of Ministers | Leonid Smirnov (1985) | CPSU | |
| Deputy Chairmen of the Council of Ministers | Vladimir Gusev (politician) (1986–1989) | CPSU | |
| Deputy Chairmen of the Council of Ministers | Vladimir Kamentsev (1986–1989) | CPSU | |
| Deputy Chairmen of the Council of Ministers | Alexandera Biriukova (1988–1989) | CPSU | |
| Deputy Chairmen of the Council of Ministers | Gennady Vedernikov (1986–1989) | CPSU | |
| Deputy Chairmen of the Council of Ministers | Boris Tolstoy (1987–1989) | CPSU | |
| Deputy Chairmen of the Council of Ministers | Igor Belousov (1988–1989) | CPSU | |
| Minister of Agriculture | Valentin Mesyats | CPSU | |
| Minister of Automotive Industry | Viktor Polyakov (1985–1986) | CPSU | |
| Minister of Automotive Industry | Nikolay Pugin (1986–1989) | CPSU | |
| Minister of Aviation Industry | Ivan Silayev (1985) | CPSU | |
| Minister of Aviation Industry | Apollon Sistov (1985–1989) | CPSU | |
| Minister of Chemical Industry | Vladimir Listov (1985–1986) | CPSU | |
| Minister of Chemical Industry | Yury Bespalov (1986–1989) | CPSU | |
| Minister of Petrochemical Machinery Construction | Konstantin Brejov (1985–1986) | CPSU | |
| Minister of Petrochemical Machinery Construction | Vladimir Lukyanenko (1986–1989) | CPSU | |
| Minister of Civil Aviation | Boris Bugayev (1985–1987) | CPSU | |
| Minister of Civil Aviation | Alexander Volkov (1987–1989) | CPSU | |
| Minister of Coal Industry | Boris Bratchenko (1985) | CPSU | |
| Minister of Coal Industry | Mikhail Shchadov (1985–1989) | CPSU | |
| Minister of Communications | Vasily Shamshin | CPSU | |
| Minister of Media Production | Erien Pervyshin | CPSU | |
| Minister of Construction | Georgy Karavayev (1985–1986) | CPSU | |
| Minister of Construction | Vladimir Reshetilov (1986) | CPSU | |
| Minister of Heavy Industrial Construction | Nikolay Goldin (1985–1986) | CPSU | |
| Minister of Heavy Industrial Construction | Sergey Bashilov (1986) | CPSU | |
| Minister of Construction Materials Industry | Sergey Voyenushkin | CPSU | |
| Minister of Construction of Oil and Gas Industries | Vladimir Chirskov | CPSU | |
| Minister of Road Machine Construction | Yevgeny Varnachev | CPSU | |
| Minister of Culture | Pyotr Demichev (1985–1986) | CPSU | |
| Minister of Culture | Vasily Zajarov (1986–1989) | CPSU | |
| Minister of Defense | Sergey Sokolov (1985–1987) | CPSU | |
| Minister of Defense | Dmitry Yazov (1987–1989) | CPSU | |
| Minister of Arms Industry | Pavel Finogenov | CPSU | |
| Minister of Trade | Grigory Vashchenko (1985–1986) | CPSU | |
| Minister of Trade | Kondrat Tereh (1986–1989) | CPSU | |
| Minister of Education | Sergey Scherbakov | CPSU | |
| Minister of Electronic Engineering | Gennady Voronovsky (1985–1986) | CPSU | |
| Minister of Electronic Engineering | Oleg Anfimov (1986–1989) | CPSU | |
| Minister of Electronic Industry | Alexandr Shokin (1985) | CPSU | |
| Minister of Electronic Industry | Vladislav Kolesnikov (1985–1989) | CPSU | |
| Minister of Finance | Vasily Garbuzov (1985) | CPSU | |
| Minister of Finance | Boris Gostev (1985–1989) | CPSU | |
| Minister of Fishing Industry | Vladimir Kamentsev (1985–1986) | CPSU | |
| Minister of Fishing Industry | Nikolai Kotlyar (1987–1989) | CPSU | |
| Minister of Food Industry | Voldemar Lein | CPSU | |
| Minister of Foreign Affairs | Eduard Shevardnadze | CPSU | |
| Minister of Foreign Trade (1985–1988) | Nikolay Patolichev (1985) | CPSU | |
| Minister of Foreign Trade (1985–1988) | Boris Aristov (1985–1989) | CPSU | |
| Minister of Foreign Economic Relations (1988–1989) | Konstantin Katushev | CPSU | |
| Minister of Horticulture (1985) | Nikolay Koslov | CPSU | |
| Minister of Gas Industry | Viktor Chernomyrdin | CPSU | |
| Minister of General Engineering | Oleg Baklanov (1985–1988) | CPSU | |
| Minister of General Engineering | Vitaly Doguzhiyev (1988–1989) | CPSU | |
| Minister of Geology | Yevgeny Kozlovsky | CPSU | |
| Minister of Purchases of Agricultural Products (1985) | Grigory Zolotujin | CPSU | |
| Minister of Grain Products (1985–1989) | Grigory Zolotujin (1985–1987) | CPSU | |
| Minister of Grain Products (1985–1989) | Alexander Budyka (1987–1989) | CPSU | |
| Minister of Health | Sergey Burenkov (1985–1986) | CPSU | |
| Minister of Health | Yevgeny Chazov (1986–1989) | CPSU | |
| Minister of Heavy Construction Machinery | Sergey Afanasiev | CPSU | |
| Minister of Higher Education | Gennady Yogadin | CPSU | |
| Minister of Industrial Construction | Arkady Schepetilnikov | CPSU | |
| Minister of Special Facilities and Constructions | Boris Bakin | CPSU | |
| Minister of Instrumentation, Automation and Control Systems | Mikhail Shkabardnya | CPSU | |
| Minister of Internal Affairs | Vitaly Fedorchuk (1985–1986) | CPSU | |
| Minister of Internal Affairs | Alexander Vlasov (1986–1988) | CPSU | |
| Minister of Internal Affairs | Vadim Bakatin (1988–1989) | CPSU | |
| Minister of Iron and Steel Industry | Serafim Kolpakov | CPSU | |
| Justice | Boris Kravtsov | CPSU | |
| Minister of Land Reclamation and Water Conservation | Nikolay Vasiliev | CPSU | |
| Light Industry | Vladimir Kliuyev | CPSU | |
| Minister of Machine Building | Vyacheslav Bajirov (1985–1987) | CPSU | |
| Minister of Machine Building | Boris Belousov (1987–1989) | CPSU | |
| Minister of Livestock Breeding and Feeding Machinery | Konstantin Belyak (1985–1986) | CPSU | |
| Minister of Livestock Breeding and Feeding Machinery | Leonid Jitrun (1986) | CPSU | |
| Minister of Machine Construction for Light and Food Industries | Lev Vasiliev | CPSU | |
| Minister of Tool and Machine Building Industry | Boris Balmont (1985–1986) | CPSU | |
| Minister of Tool and Machine Building Industry | Nikolay Panichev (1986–1989) | CPSU | |
| Minister of Meat and Dairy Industry | Yevgeny Sizenko | CPSU | |
| Minister of Medical Industry (1985) | Afanasy Melnichenko | CPSU | |
| Minister of Medical and Microbiological Industry(1985–1989) | Valery Býkov | CPSU | |
| Minister of Medium Mechanics | Yefim Slavsky (1985–1986) | CPSU | |
| Minister of Medium Mechanics | Lev Ryabev (1986–1989) | CPSU | |
| Minister of Merchant Navy | Timofey Guzenko (1985–1986) | CPSU | |
| Minister of Merchant Navy | Yury Volmer (1986–1989) | CPSU | |
| Minister of Mineral Fertilizer Production | Alexey Petrishchev (1985–1986) | CPSU | |
| Minister of Mineral Fertilizer Production | Nikolay Olshansky (1986–1989) | CPSU | |
| Minister of Non-Ferrous Metallurgy | Pyotr Lomako (1985–1986) | CPSU | |
| Minister of Non-Ferrous Metallurgy | Vladimir Durasov (1986–1989) | CPSU | |
| Minister of Petroleum Industry | Vasily Dinkov | CPSU | |
| Minister of Petroleum and Petrochemical Industry | Viktor Fyodorov (1985) | CPSU | |
| Minister of Petroleum and Petrochemical Industry | Nikolay Lemayev (1985–1989) | CPSU | |
| Minister of Energy and Electrification | Anatoly Mayorets | CPSU | |
| Minister of Power Plant Construction | Vladimir Velichko | CPSU | |
| Minister of Radio Industry | Pyotr Pleshakov (1985–1987) | CPSU | |
| Minister of Radio Industry | Vladimir Shimko (1987–1988) | CPSU | |
| Railways | Nikolay Konariev | CPSU | |
| Minister of Agricultural Production | Viktor Danilenko | CPSU | |
| Minister of Naval Construction | Igor Belousov (1985–1988) | CPSU | |
| Minister of Naval Construction | Igor Koksanov (1988–1989) | CPSU | |
| Minister of Forestry Industry and Wood Processing (Soviet Union) | Mikhail Busygin | CPSU | |
| Minister of Agricultural and Automobile Machinery | Alexander Yezhevsky | CPSU | |
| Minister of Transport Construction | Vladimir Arkadyevich Brezhnev | CPSU | |
| Minister of Construction of the Far East and Transbaikal Region | Alexander Babenko | CPSU | |
| Minister of Construction of the Northern and Western Regions (1986–1989) | Vladimir Reshetilov | CPSU | |
| Minister of Construction of the Southern Region (1986–1989) | Arkady Schepetilnikov | CPSU | |
| Minister of Construction in the Urals and Western Siberya Regions (1986–1989) | Sergey Bashilov | CPSU | |
| Minister of Construction in the Eastern Regions (1986–1989) | Alexander Babenko | CPSU | |
| Minister of Nuclear Energy Industry | Nikolay Lukonin | CPSU | |
| Minister of Agricultural and Automobile Machinery | Nikolay Pugin | CPSU | |
| Chairman of the People's Control Commission | Alexey Shkolnikov (1985–1987) | CPSU | |
| Chairman of the People's Control Commission | Sergey Manyakin (1987–1989) | CPSU | |
| Chairman of the State Planning Committee | Nikolay Baibakov (1985) | CPSU | |
| Chairman of the State Planning Committee | Nikolay Talyzin (1985–1988) | CPSU | |
| Chairman of the State Planning Committee | Yuri Maslyukov (1988–1989) | CPSU | |
| State Security Committee | Viktor Chebrikov (1985–1988) | CPSU | |
| State Security Committee | Vladimir Kryuchkov (1988–1989) | CPSU | |

Government offices
| Preceded by Tikhonov's Second Government | Governments of the Soviet Union; September 27, 1985 – July 17, 1989 | Succeeded by Ryzhkov's Second Government |
