= Ministry of Agricultural Machine-Building =

Government ministry of the Soviet Union

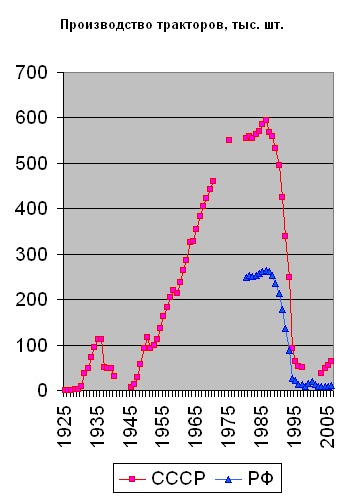
Graph of annual tractor production in the Soviet Union (thousands)

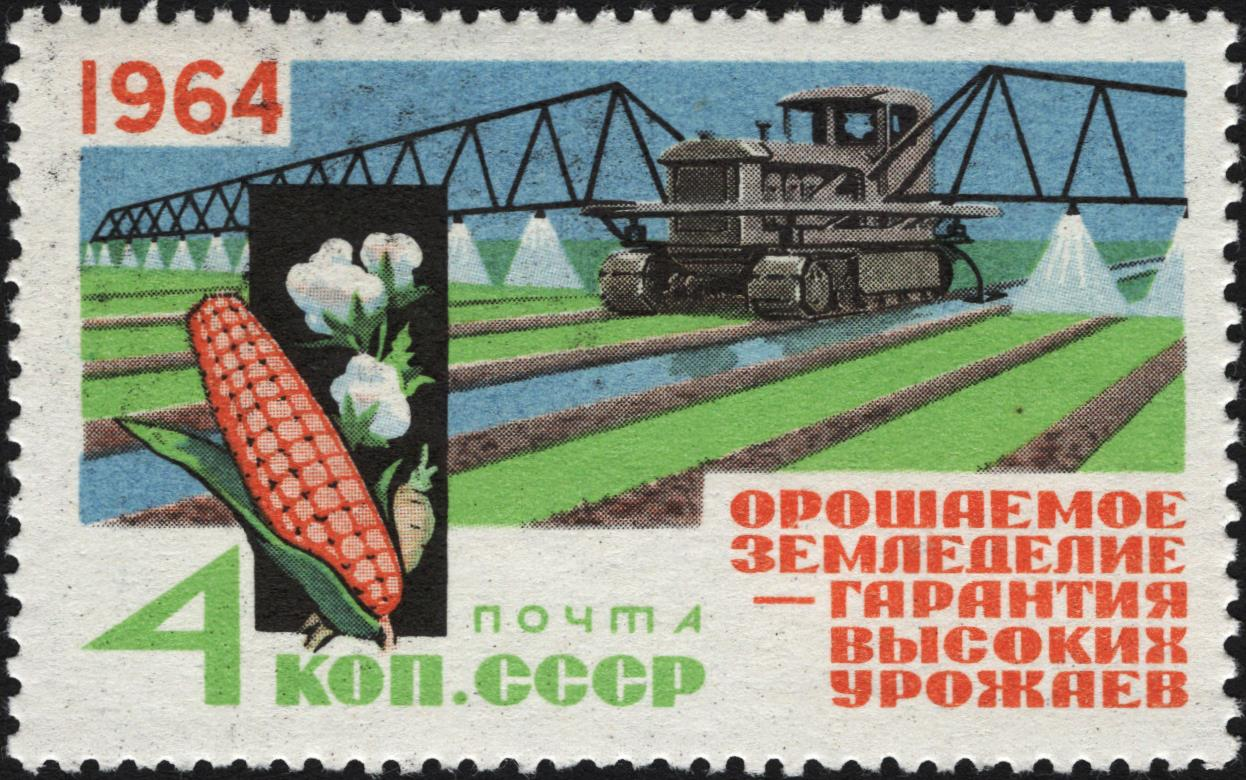
Soviet stamp, 1964, depicting an irrigation system

The Ministry of Agricultural Machine Building (Minselmash; Russian: Министерство сельскохозяйственного машиностроения СССР) was a government ministry in the Soviet Union. It was charged with the manufacture of agricultural vehicles and tractors and other machines related to the agricultural industry.

== History ==
On 11 January 1939 the People's Commissariat of Defence Industry of the USSR (Народный комиссариат оборонной промышленности) was divided into several departments, among which was the People's Commissariat of Munitions (shortened to NKB in Russian).

It oversaw the work of 53 production plants and 12 design offices, five construction companies, 5 universities and 11 technical schools. In 1939 it employed 337,141 workers.

The Ministry of Agricultural Machine Building stems from the Main Administration of Agricultural Machine Building (Glavsel'mash). A law of 29 August 1937 lists the main Administration of Agricultural Machine Building among the main administrations to be transferred from the People's Commissariat of Heavy Industry to the People's Commissariat of Machine Building. This main administration was next transferred to the People's Commissariat of Medium Machine Building on 5 February 1939.

A ukase of the Presidium of the Supreme Soviet USSR of 7 January 1946 reorganized the People's Commissariat of Munitions and its enterprises, tractor plants of the People's Commissariat of Medium Machine Building and the People's Commissariat of Transport Machine Building, and agricultural machine building plants of the People's Commissariat of Mortar Armament into the People's Commissariat of Agricultural Machine Building.

By the law of 15 March 1946 which reorganized the Council of People's Commissariats into the Council of Ministers USSR, the People's Commissariat of Agricultural Machine Building became the Ministry of Agricultural Machine Building.

== List of ministers ==
People's Commissar for Munitions:

- Ivan P. Sergeev (11.1.1939 - 8.3.1941)
- Peter Goremykin (8.3.1941 - 16.2.1942)
- Boris Vannikov (16.2.1942 - 7.1.1946)

Ministers of Agricultural Machines:

- Boris Vannikov (7.1.1946 - 26.6.1946)
- Pjotr Goremykin (26.6.1946 - 14.3.1951)
- Georgi Popov (14.3.1951 - 15.3.1953)

Ministers of Tractors and Agricultural Machines:

- Ivan Sinizyn (2.10.1965 - 10.10.1980)
- Aleksandr Yezhevski (10.10.1980 - 19.10.1988)
