= Ministries of the Soviet Union =

Departments of the Soviet government

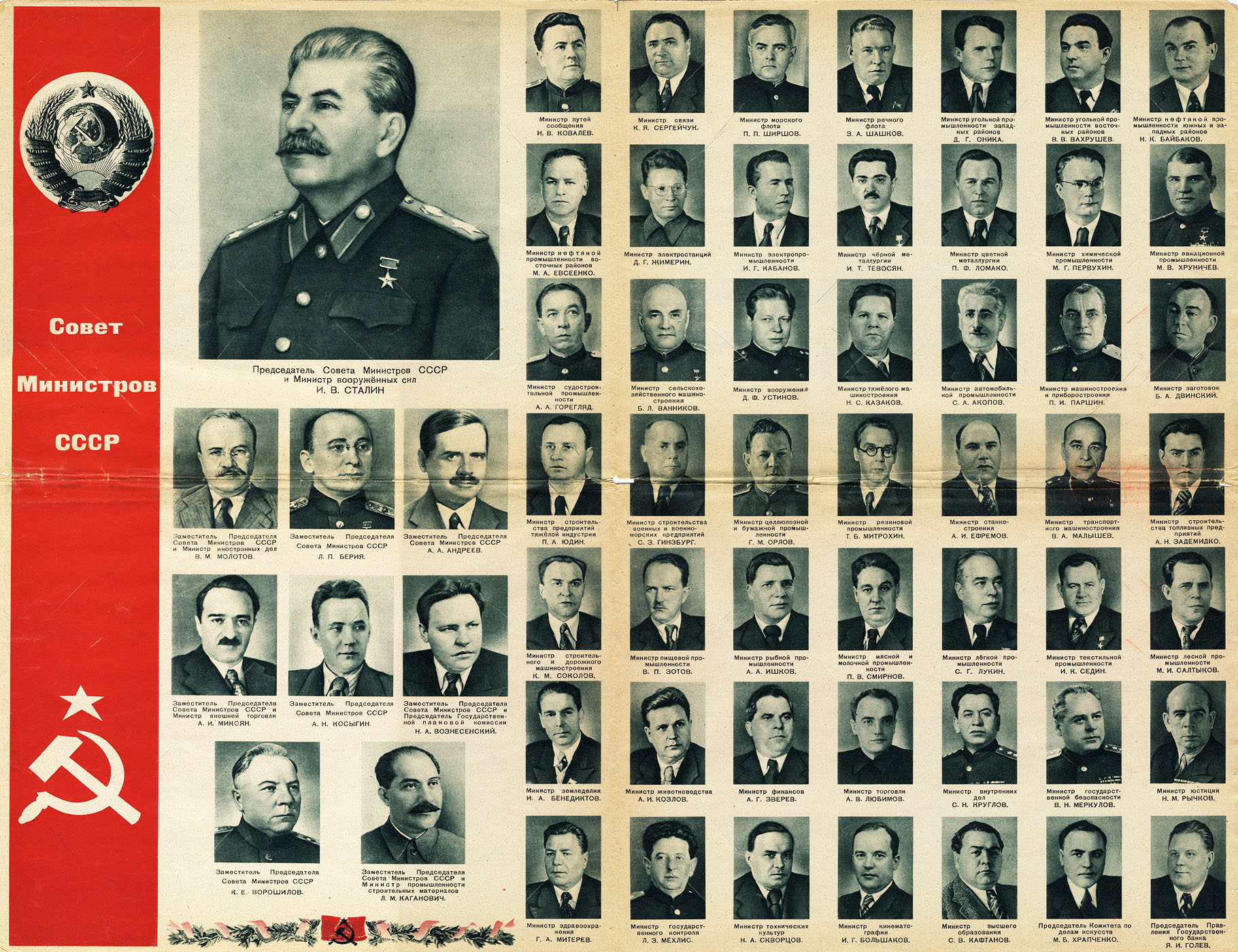
Ministers of the USSR during the late Stalin era (1946–1953).

The Ministries of the Soviet Union (Russian: Министерства СССР) were the government ministries of the Soviet Union.

After the Russian Revolution of 1917 the previous bureaucratic apparatus of bourgeois ministers was replaced by People's Commissariats (Russian: народных комиссариатов; Narkom), staffed by new employees drawn from workers and peasants. On 15 March 1946 the people's commissariats were transformed into ministries. The name change had no practical effects, other than restoring a designation previously considered a leftover of the bourgeois era. The collapse of the ministry system was one of the main causes behind the dissolution of the Soviet Union.

State Committees were also subordinated to the Council of Ministers of the Soviet Union and had similar powers and rights.

== History ==
After the end of World War II, Commissariats were reorganized to meet the needs of reconstruction. The Commissariats of the Tank Industry and of Mortar Armament were liquidated. Their staffs and facilities became a part of a large number of Commissariats created in late 1945 and 1946. The activities of the new Commissariats were denoted by the titles: Agricultural Machinery Construction, Automobile Industry, Construction and Road Building Machinery, Construction of Fuel Enterprises, Construction of Heavy Industry Enterprises, Heavy Machine Building, Machinery and Instruments, and Transport Machinery Building.

Khrushchev decentralized authority, abolishing ten ministries. These were ministries whose factories and construction projects could be better managed closer to the scene by a regional economic council. These included the Automobile Industry Ministry, the Ministry of Construction of Oil Industry Enterprises, and the Heavy Machine Building Ministry.

Also, fifteen ministries, transferred previously from Moscow to Republic capitals in a preliminary effort at decentralization, were now disbanded. The functions of such republican ministries as those of the Coal Industry, Fish Industry, Oil Industry, and Construction of Coal Industry Enterprises were delegated to regional economic councils.

All Soviet ministries, with the exception of the Ministry of Defense and the Ministry of Atomic Energy, were abolished or taken over by the Russian Federation on 20 December 1991. The Soviet Ministry of Atomic Energy was abolished in January 1992, replaced by the Ministry for Atomic Energy of the Russian Federation. The Soviet Ministry of Defense was disbanded on 16 March 1992.

== Ministry system ==
Ministers were the chief administrative officials of the government. While most ministers managed branches of the economy, others managed affairs of state, such as foreign policy, defense, justice, and finance. Unlike parliamentary systems in which ministers are members of the parliament, Soviet ministers were not necessarily members of the Supreme Soviet and did not have to be elected. Soviet ministers usually rose within a ministry; having begun work in one ministry, they could, however, be appointed to a similar position in another. Thus, by the time the party appointed an official to a ministerial position, that person was fully acquainted with the affairs of the ministry and was well trained in avoiding conflict with the party. Until the late 1980s, ministers enjoyed long tenures, commonly serving for decades and often dying in office.

Ministries and state committees not only managed the economy, government, and society but also could make laws. Most ministries and state committees issued orders and instructions that were binding only on their organizations. Some ministries, however, could issue orders within a legally specified area of responsibility that were binding on society as a whole. These orders carried the same force of law as acts of the Supreme Soviet. For example, the Ministry of Finance set the rules for any form of foreign exchange.

=== All-union and union-republic ministries ===
Two types of ministries made up the ministerial system: all-union and union-republic.

All-union ministries oversaw a particular activity for the entire country and were controlled by the all-union party apparatus and the government in Moscow. Republic governments had no corresponding ministry, although all-union ministries had branch offices in the republics.

Union-republic ministries had a central ministry in Moscow, which coordinated the work of counterpart ministries in the republic governments. Republic party organizations also oversaw the work of the union-republic ministries in their domain.

The Constitution determined into which category certain ministries fell. The Ministry of Foreign Affairs was a union-republic ministry, reflecting the republics' constitutional right to foreign representation. Although the republics had foreign ministries, the central Ministry of Foreign Affairs in Moscow in fact conducted all diplomacy for the Soviet Union.

All-union ministries were more centralized, thus permitting greater control over vital functions. Union-republic ministries appeared to exercise limited autonomy in nonvital areas. In practice, the central government dominated the union-republic ministries, although in theory each level of government possessed equal authority over its affairs.

Union-republic ministries offered some practical economic advantages. Republic representatives in the union-republic ministries attempted to ensure that the interests of the republics were taken into account in policy formation. In addition, the arrangement permitted the central ministry to set guidelines that the republics could then adapt to their local conditions. The central ministry in Moscow also could delegate some responsibilities to the republic level.

The internal structures of both all-union and union-republic ministries were highly centralized. A central ministry had large functional departments and specialized directorates. Chief directorates carried out the most important specialized functions in larger ministries. Specialized functions included foreign contracts, planning, finance, construction, personnel, and staff services. The first department of any ministry, staffed by personnel from the Committee for State Security (Komitet gosudarstvennoi bezopasnosti, KGB), controlled security.

State committees and government agencies similarly were categorized as all-union and union-republic organizations. State committees oversaw technical matters that involved many aspects of government, such as standards, inventions and discoveries, labor and social issues, sports, prices, and statistics. Other agencies, such as the news agency TASS and the Academy of Sciences, oversaw affairs under their purview.

== Party Control of the Ministerial Apparatus ==
The ministries and state committees operated without the appearance of party control. Nevertheless, the party ensured its authority over the government through several mechanisms designed to preserve its leading role in society.

Considerable overlap between the memberships of the Council of Ministers and leading party bodies facilitated both policy coordination between the two organizations and party control. The chairman of the Council of Ministers normally occupied a seat on the Politburo, which gave him additional authority to ensure the implementation of his decisions. In 1989 the first deputy chairman of the Council of Ministers, Yuri Maslyukov, was promoted to full-member status on the Central Committee, and both he and deputy chairman Aleksandra P. Biriukova were candidate members of the Politburo. In early 1989, Viktor M. Chebrikov, the head of the KGB, and Eduard A. Shevardnadze, the minister of foreign affairs, were also Politburo members. In addition, most ministers and chairmen of state committees were either full or candidate members of the Central Committee. Thus, the norms of democratic centralism obliged council members to adhere to party policies.

Within the Council of Ministers and the ministries, the party used its nomenklatura authority to place its people in influential positions. Nomenklatura refers both to the positions that the Central Committee apparatus of the party has the power to fill and to a list of people qualified to fill them. Approximately one third of the administrative positions in the council bureaucracy, including the most important ones, were on the nomenklatura list. Occupants of these positions well understood that the party could remove them if they failed to adhere to its policies.

Finally, in what is known as dual subordination, the staff of each ministry was required to respond to orders and directions from its primary party organization (PPO), as well as to the ministries' hierarchy. Party members on the staff of the ministry were bound by the norms of democratic centralism to obey the orders of the secretary of the PPO, who represented the CPSU hierarchy in the ministry. The secretary of the PPO ensured that CPSU policies were carried out in the day-to-day activities of the ministries.

== Industrial ministries ==
=== Defense-industrial ministries ===
The principal organizations involved in Soviet military science and technology were subordinate to the defense industrial ministries. The ministries responsible for research, design, and production of military equipment and weapons or their components consisted of the Ministry of the Aviation Industry, the Ministry of the Communications Equipment Industry, the Ministry of the Defense Industry, the Ministry of the Electronics Industry, the Ministry of General Machine Building, the Ministry of the Machine Tool and Tool-Building Industry, the Ministry of Medium Machine Building, the Ministry of the Radio Industry, and the Ministry of the Shipbuilding Industry.

These nine ministries were among the eighteen ministries of the machine-building and metal-working complex (MBMW) under the control of the Defense Council. Each of the nine ministries incorporated institutes engaged in applied research and a network of bureaus responsible for designing and developing new military equipment and processes. In 1989 these ministries directed the work of thousands of plants making weapons and weapons components, at least 450 military research and development organizations, and approximately fifty major design bureaus.

Other industrial ministries contributed to military research, development, and production. For example, some military vehicles were produced by the Ministry of Automotive and Agricultural Machine Building, and fuel and chemical warfare agents were produced by the Ministry of the Chemical Industry.

== See also ==
- List of Ministries of the Soviet Union
- Bibliography of the Russian Revolution and Civil War § Government
- Bibliography of Stalinism and the Soviet Union § Government
- Bibliography of the Post Stalinist Soviet Union § Government
- Council of People's Commissars, head of government from 1917 to 1946
- Council of Ministers, head of government from 1946 to 1991
- Cabinet of Ministers, head of government in 1991
- State Committee of the Soviet Union
