= SS Mary Cassatt =

American ship

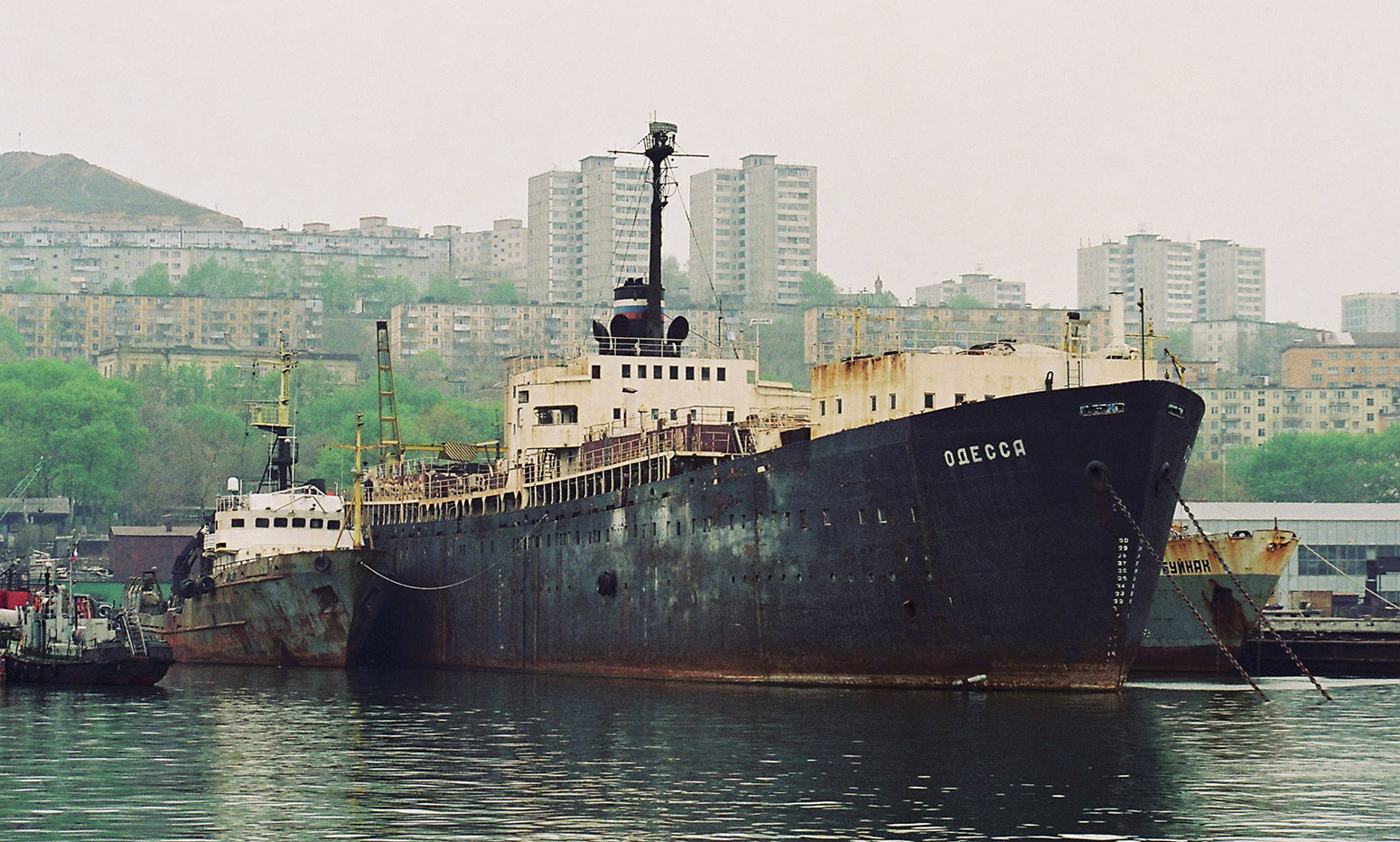
- Odessa in May 2003

History

United States
- Name: Mary Cassatt
- Namesake: Mary Cassatt
- Builder: California Shipbuilding Corp
- Way number: 1553
- Laid down: 17 April 1943
- Launched: 16 May 1943
- Fate: Transferred to Soviet Navy, 1943

History

Soviet Union
- Name: Odessa
- Commissioned: 1943
- Decommissioned: 2000s
- Fate: Unknown

General characteristics
- Class & type: Liberty ship
- Displacement: 14,245 long tons (14,474 t)
- Length: 441 ft 6 in (134.57 m) o/a; 417 ft 9 in (127.33 m) p/p; 427 ft (130 m) w/l
- Beam: 57 ft (17 m)
- Draft: 27 ft 9 in (8.46 m)
- Propulsion: Two oil-fired boilers; Triple-expansion steam engine; 2,500 hp (1,900 kW); Single screw
- Speed: 11 knots (20 km/h; 13 mph)
- Range: 20,000 nmi (37,000 km; 23,000 mi)
- Capacity: 10,856 t (10,685 long tons) deadweight (DWT)
- Crew: 81
- Armament: Stern-mounted 4 in (100 mm) deck gun for use against surfaced submarines, variety of anti-aircraft guns

SS Mary Cassatt was an American Liberty ship built in 1943 for service in World War II. Her namesake was Mary Cassatt, an American painter and printmaker.

== Design ==
Like other Liberty ships, she was 441 feet (134 m) long and 56 feet (17 m) wide, carried 9000 tons of cargo and had a top speed of 11 knots (20 km/h). Most Liberty ships were named after prominent deceased Americans.

== Construction and career ==
The keel of the ship was laid on April 17, 1943. Few months later the Kaiser Permanente Metals launched in Los Angeles under the name Mary Cassatt. She was transferred to the Soviet Union later that year to be commissioned with the name Odessa. The ship survived the World War II unscathed.

The ship was not returned to the United States and remained in use as a merchant ship by the Soviet Navy until 1976.

In 1977 it was bought by Far Eastern Shipping Co, Vladivostok and used as a transport ship until mid-1982.

At the end of 1982 the ship became the Ministry of the Fishing Industry and the ship was converted into a fishing storage.

She was decommissioned in 2000s and in 2003 was used as a storage ship in Vladivostok.
