= Boris Belousov =

Boris Belousov may refer to:

- Boris Belousov (chemist) (1893–1970), Soviet chemist and biophysicist who discovered the Belousov-Zhabotinsky reaction
- Boris Belousov (politician) (1934–2026), Soviet minister of defense industry
