= Stepan Shalayev =

Soviet-Russian politician (1929–2022)

Stepan Shalaev
- Степан Шалаев

Minister of Timber, Paper and Wood Processing Industry
- In office 30 October 1980 – 11 March 1982
- Preceded by: Konstantin Galanshin
- Succeeded by: Mikhail Busygin

Chairman of the All-Union Central Council of Trade Unions
- In office 1982–1990
- Preceded by: Alexei Shibayev
- Succeeded by: Gennady Yanayev

Personal details
- Born: Stepan Alexeevich Shalaev; 5 January 1929 Mordovskaya Polyana, Central Volga Krai, Russian SFSR, Soviet Union
- Died: 18 January 2022 (aged 93) Moscow, Russia
- Party: CPSU

Stepan Alexeevich Shalaev (Russian: Степан Алексеевич Шалаев; 5 January 1929 – 18 January 2022) was a Russian politician.

A member of the Communist Party, he served as Minister of Timber, Paper and Wood Processing Industry from 1980 to 1982 and chaired the All-Union Central Council of Trade Unions from 1982 to 1990. He died in Moscow on 18 January 2022, at the age of 93.
