= Oleg Shishkin =

Oleg Shishkin may refer to:

- Oleg Șișchin, Moldovan footballer and coach
- Oleg Shishkin (politician)
