= NKB =

NKB may refer to:

- Neurokinin B, a neuropeptide
- Dutch Korfball Association, former name of the Royal Dutch Korfball Association
- National Royalist Movement, a Belgian resistance group in World War II
- People's Commissariat of Munitions, in the USSR
- the ISO 639-3 language code for Khoibu language, a language spoken in India
- the IATA code for Noonkanbah Airport in Australia, in List of airports in Australia
