= Ivan Nosenko =

Soviet politician

- Иван Носенко

Minister of Shipbuilding Industry of the USSR
- In office 19 April 1954 – 2 August 1956
- Premier: Georgy Malenkov Nikolai Bulganin
- Preceded by: Position re-established
- Succeeded by: Andrei Redkin
- In office 17 April 1940 – 15 March 1946
- Preceded by: Ivan Tevosian
- Succeeded by: Aleksei Goreglyad

Personal details
- Born: 19 April 1902 Berlevets, Bryansky Uyezd, Russian Empire
- Died: 2 August 1956 (aged 54) Moscow, Russian SFSR
- Resting place: Kremlin Wall Necropolis
- Citizenship: Soviet Union
- Party: Communist Party of the Soviet Union (1925–1956)
- Awards: 3 Orders of Lenin

Military service
- Rank: Engineer Rear Admiral

Ivan Isidorovich Nosenko (Russian: Иван Исидорович Носенко; 19 April 1902 – 2 August 1956) was a Soviet politician and, from 1939 until his death in 1956, the Minister of Shipbuilding Industry of the USSR. He was the father of notable Soviet defector and KGB officer, Yuri Nosenko.

== Biography ==
Nosenko was born in the village of Berlevets in Bryansky Uyezd and joined the Nikolayev Shipyard as a messenger boy in 1914. He became a trade unionist, and after completing military service and graduating from the Nikolayev Shipbuilding Institute, returned to the yard as a manager. Nosenko joined the All-Union Communist Party (b) in 1925. Between 1938 and 1939 he was the managing director of the Baltic Yard in Leningrad. He was appointed Narkom (minister) of shipbuilding in 1940 and was also the 1st deputy commissar of the tank industry during the war. He was elected to the Supreme Soviet in 1954.

He died on August 2, 1956. At his funeral, important leaders of the Soviet Union, including Nikita Khrushchev, Georgy Malenkov, Nikolai Bulganin and Kliment Voroshilov, formed the honor guard. He has been commemorated with a bronze plaque in the Kremlin wall.

== Awards and honors ==
- Three Orders of Lenin
- Order of Nakhimov, 1st class (1945)
- Three Orders of the Red Banner of Labour
- Order of the Red Star (1942)
- Order of the Badge of Honour (1938)
