= Stories About Lenin =

- Russian: Рассказы о Ленине
- Directed by: Sergei Yutkevich
- Written by: Mikhail Volpin; Nikolai Erdman; Yevgeny Gabrilovich
- Starring: Maksim Shtraukh; Oleg Yefremov; Vsevolod Sanayev; Gennadi Yukhtin
- Cinematography: Andrei Moskvin
- Music by: Sergei Taneyev; Sergei Rachmaninoff
- Production company: Mosfilm
- Release date: 1957
- Running time: 115 min.
- Country: Soviet Union
- Language: Russian

Stories About Lenin (Russian: Рассказы о Ленине, romanized: Rasskazy o Lenine) is a 1957 Soviet drama film directed by Sergei Yutkevich.

The story tells about the events connected with Lenin in 1917 (when he was supposed to be in Finland) and in 1923–1924, when his life was approaching the end.

== Plot ==
This film portrays select episodes from the life of Vladimir Lenin, offering a glimpse into his extraordinary legacy. While not aiming to present a complete depiction, it captures valuable facets of this revered revolutionary leader.

=== The Soldier Mukhina's Feat ===
Screenplay: Mikhail Volpin, Nikolai Erdman

June 1917. The Provisional Government has seized power. Yakov Sverdlov arrives at Lenin's apartment, informing him of the destruction of the Pravda newspaper's editorial office and the Central Committee's decision to move Lenin into hiding. Lenin and Sverdlov leave the apartment just as military cadets arrive to search it.

Soldier Mukhina struggles to understand the officers' animosity towards Lenin. Lenin's sister, Maria Ulyanova, explains her brother's fight for the people's happiness. Meanwhile, Lenin hides in a hut in Razliv, pursued by government agents. When the officers discover Lenin's location, Mukhina resolves to warn him before they arrive. Racing to the hut, Mukhina mistakes a Finnish peasant for Lenin and tells him about the imminent danger and his own hardships.

=== The Last Autumn ===
Screenplay: Evgeny Gabrilovich

1923. A gravely ill Lenin is brought to Gorki. A young Komsomol nurse, Sasha, is tasked with his care and strictly instructed to allow no visitors. However, at Lenin's insistence, Sasha brings her fiancé, Kolya, an electrician, to repair a radio. During their conversation, Lenin learns about internal party opposition advocating for the abolition of party discipline and factional freedom.

Despite his declining health, Lenin visits a factory to address the workers, urging them to resist the opposition. The trip worsens his condition, prompting those around him to realize the importance of allowing Lenin to interact with the people. Workers and peasants begin visiting him, including former soldier Mukhina, now a factory foreman.

On January 21, 1924, as Lenin listens to his wife, Nadezhda Krupskaya, reading Jack London's Love of Life, his hand falls lifelessly. Krupskaya's anguished cry breaks the silence—Lenin has passed away.

== Cast ==
- Maksim Shtraukh as Vladimir Lenin
- Maria Pastukhova as Nadezhda Krupskaya
- Anna Lisyanskaya as Maria Ilyinichna Ulyanova
- Oleg Yefremov as Felix Dzerzhinsky
- Aleksandr Kutepov as Yakov Sverdlov
- Vsevolod Sanayev as Nikolai Yemelyanov
- Gennadi Yukhtin as Fyodor Mukhin
- Lyubov Studneva as Yefrosinya Ivanovna
- Boris Bibikov as general Polovtsev
- Pavel Sukhanov as Pavel Nikolayevich
- Lev Polyakov as lieutenant Baryshev
- Aleksandr Belyavsky as Kolya
- Ivan Voronov as Grigory Belov

== Awards ==
- XI Karlovy Vary International Film Festival for Best Actor (Maksim Shtraukh)
- All-Union Film Festival — honorary diploma (Sergei Yutkevich, Maksim Shtraukh)
