= Talyzin =

Talyzin (Russian: Талызин) is a masculine surname, its feminine counterpart is Talyzina. Notable people with the surname include:

- Nikolai Talyzin (1929–1991), Soviet bureaucrat and economist
- Valentina Talyzina (1935–2025), Soviet and Russian film and stage actress
