= Ministry of Timber Industry =

Government ministry of the Soviet Union

The Ministry of Timber Industry (Minlesprom; Russian: Министерство лесной промышленности СССР) was a government ministry in the Soviet Union.

== History ==
The Soviet timber industry has been reorganized repeatedly. On 5 January 1932, the Administration of Timber and Woodworking Industry was separated from the Supreme Council of the National Economy and reformed as the People's Commissariat of Timber Industry USSR. According to the Stalin Constitution, the People's Commissariat of Timber Industry USSR was a union-republic commissariat, organized on the production-territorial principle.

On 7 April 1940, the People's Commissariat of Cellulose and Paper Industry USSR was formed, and the appropriate offices and functions transferred to it from the jurisdiction of the People's Commissariat of Timber Industry USSR. On 15 March 1946, the People's Commissariats of Timber Industry USSR and Cellulose and Paper Industry USSR became, respectively, the Ministry of Timber Industry USSR and the Ministry of Cellulose and Paper Industry USSR.

On 29 July 1948, the two Ministries were combined into the Ministry of Timber and Paper Industry USSR. On 16 February 1951, the Ministry of Timber and Paper Industry USSR was divided into the union-republic Ministry of Timber Industry and the all-union Ministry of Paper and Woodworking Industry.

== List of ministers ==
- Semjon Lobov (5.1.1932 - 1.10.1936)
- Vladimir Ivanov (1.10.1936 - 30.12.1937)
- Mikhail Ryshkov (30.12.1937 - 30.10.1938)
- Naum Antselovitsh (30.10.1938 - 2.7.1940)
- Fjodor Sergejev (2.7.1940 - 1.1.1942)
- Mikhail Saltykov (1.1.1942 - 12.3.1947)
- Georgi Orlov (12.3.1947 - 13.7.1957)
