= People's Commissariat of Mortar Armament =

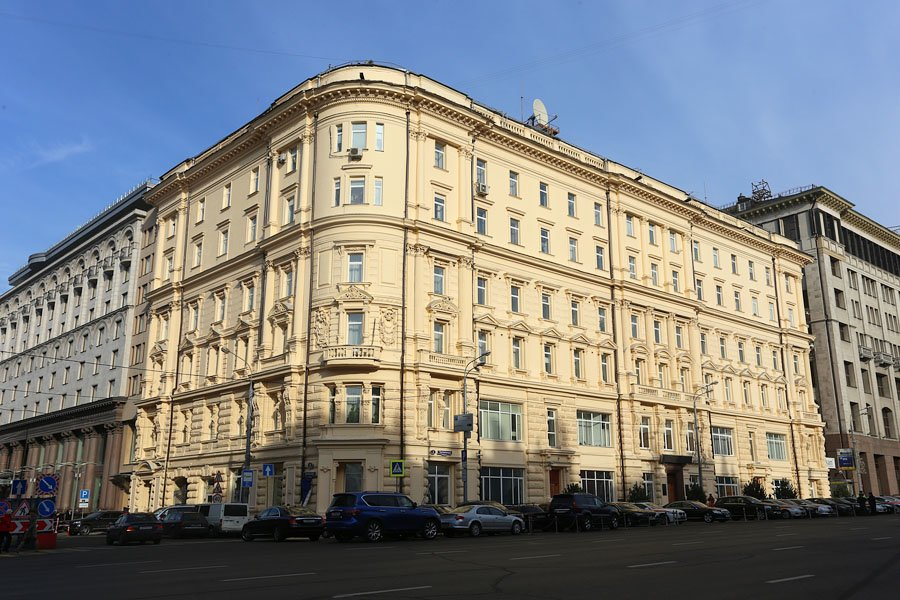

The People's Commissariat of Mortar Armament (Russian: Народный комиссариат миномётного вооружения СССР) was one of the central offices in the Soviet Union, the equivalent of a Ministry, which oversaw the production of mortar weapons.

It was created on November 26, 1941, as the People's Commissariat of General Machine-Building Industry of the USSR (Наркомат общего машиностроения СССР). On February 17, 1946, it became the People's Commissariat of Machine Industry and Tooling of the USSR (Наркомат машиностроения и приборостроения СССР).

== Headquarters ==
The headquarters were in the Chludov building in Moscow at Teatralniy Proezd (Театральный проезд). The phone book does not indicate the address of the Ministry.

== List of ministers ==
- Pjotr Parshin (20.11.1941 - 17.2.1946)
