= Ivan Arkhipov =

Soviet-Russian statesman (1907–1998)

- Иван Архипов

First Deputy Chairman of the Council of Ministers of the Soviet Union
- In office 27 October 1980 – 4 October 1986 Serving with Heydar Aliyev, Andrei Gromyko, Nikolai Talyzin and Vsevolod Murakhovsky
- Premier: Nikolai Tikhonov; Nikolai Ryzhkov

Personal details
- Born: 18 April 1907 Kaluga, Russian Empire
- Died: 28 February 1998 (aged 90) Moscow, Russia
- Party: Communist Party of the Soviet Union (1928–1989)

Ivan Vasilyevich Arkhipov (Russian: Иван Васильевич Архипов; 18 April [O.S. 1 May] 1907 – 28 February 1998) was a Soviet and Russian statesman who was First Deputy of the Council of Ministers from 1980 to 1986. In 1950, Stalin sent him as an economic adviser to China, where he spent much of the next 10 years.

== Biography ==
He was born 18 April 1907 in the city of Kaluga.

- 1921-1929 - turner in railway workshops, Kaluga.
- In 1932, he graduated from the Moscow Machine Tool Institute
- 1932-1933 - design engineer of the plant, Kovrov
- 1933-1937 - senior foreman, deputy shop foreman, shop foreman at the Dzerzhinsky Metallurgical Plant in Dneprodzerzhinsk
- 1937-1938 - chief mechanic of the Krivoy Rog Metallurgical Plant
- 1938-1939 - First Secretary of the Krivoy Rog City Committee of the Communist Party (Bolsheviks) of Ukraine
- 1939-1943 - Head of the Non-Ferrous Metallurgy Department of the Personnel Department of the Central Committee of the All-Union Communist Party (Bolsheviks).
- 1943-1948 - Deputy People's Commissar of Non-Ferrous Metallurgy of the USSR
- 1948-1950 - Deputy Minister of Metallurgical Industry of the USSR
- 1950-1951 - Chief Advisor on Economic Issues at the State Economic Council of the People's Republic of China
- 1950-1953 - First Deputy Minister of Non-Ferrous Metallurgy of the USSR
- 1953-1954 - Deputy Minister of Metallurgical Industry of the USSR
- 1953-1958 - Chief Advisor on Economic Issues at the State Economic Council of the People's Republic of China
- 1954-1957 - Deputy Minister of Non-Ferrous Metallurgy of the USSR
- 1958-1974 - Deputy (1958-1959), First Deputy Chairman of the State Committee of the USSR Council of Ministers for Foreign Economic Relations
- 1974-1980 - Deputy Chairman of the Council of Ministers of the USSR
- 1980-1986 - First Deputy Chairman of the Council of Ministers of the Soviet Union

== Later life ==
He retired in October 1986, and was removed from the CPSU Central Committee at the Central Committee Plenum in April 1989. He died on February 28, 1998. He was buried at the Troekurovskoye Cemetery in Moscow. In 2009, he was included in the List of 60 Foreigners Who Have Had a Great Influence on New China.

== Family ==
- Wife - Ekaterina Dmitrievna Arkhipova (Karpikhina) (1912-2006)
- Children:
  - Son - Leonid Ivanovich Arkhipov (1934-2016);
  - Daughter - Zinaida Ivanovna Suetina (Arkhipova) (born 1936);
  - Daughter - Alina Ivanovna Bolotova (Arkhipova) (1938-2022);
  - Son - Boris Ivanovich Arkhipov (born 1940);
  - Son - Alexander Ivanovich Arkhipov (1945-2020).
- Grandchildren:
  - Alexey Borisovich Stepanov (born December 28, 1959) - reserve colonel, uniform historian .
  - Ivan Borisovich Arkhipov (born June 16, 1966) heads the I.V. Arkhipov Foundation for the Development of Socioeconomic Relations between Russia and China, established in 2013 in memory of Ivan Vasilyevich Arkhipov.

== Honours and awards ==
- Hero of Socialist Labour (1977)
- Five Orders of Lenin
- Order of the October Revolution
- Order of the Red Banner of Labour, twice
- Order of Carlos Manuel de Céspedes (1986)
