= Ministry of Construction of Machine-Building Enterprises =

Government ministry of the Soviet Union

The Ministry of Construction of Machine-Building Enterprises (Russian: Министерство строительства предприятий машиностроения СССР) was a government ministry in the Soviet Union.

A ukase of the Presidium, Supreme Soviet USSR, of 9 March 1949 consolidated the Ministry of Construction of Military and Naval Enterprises and the Main Administration for Construction of Machine Building Enterprises under the Council of Ministers USSR into the Ministry of Construction of Machine Building Enterprises USSR.

== List of ministers ==
- Nikolai Dygai (9.3.1949 - 15.3.1953)
