= Eve Kivi =

Estonian actress

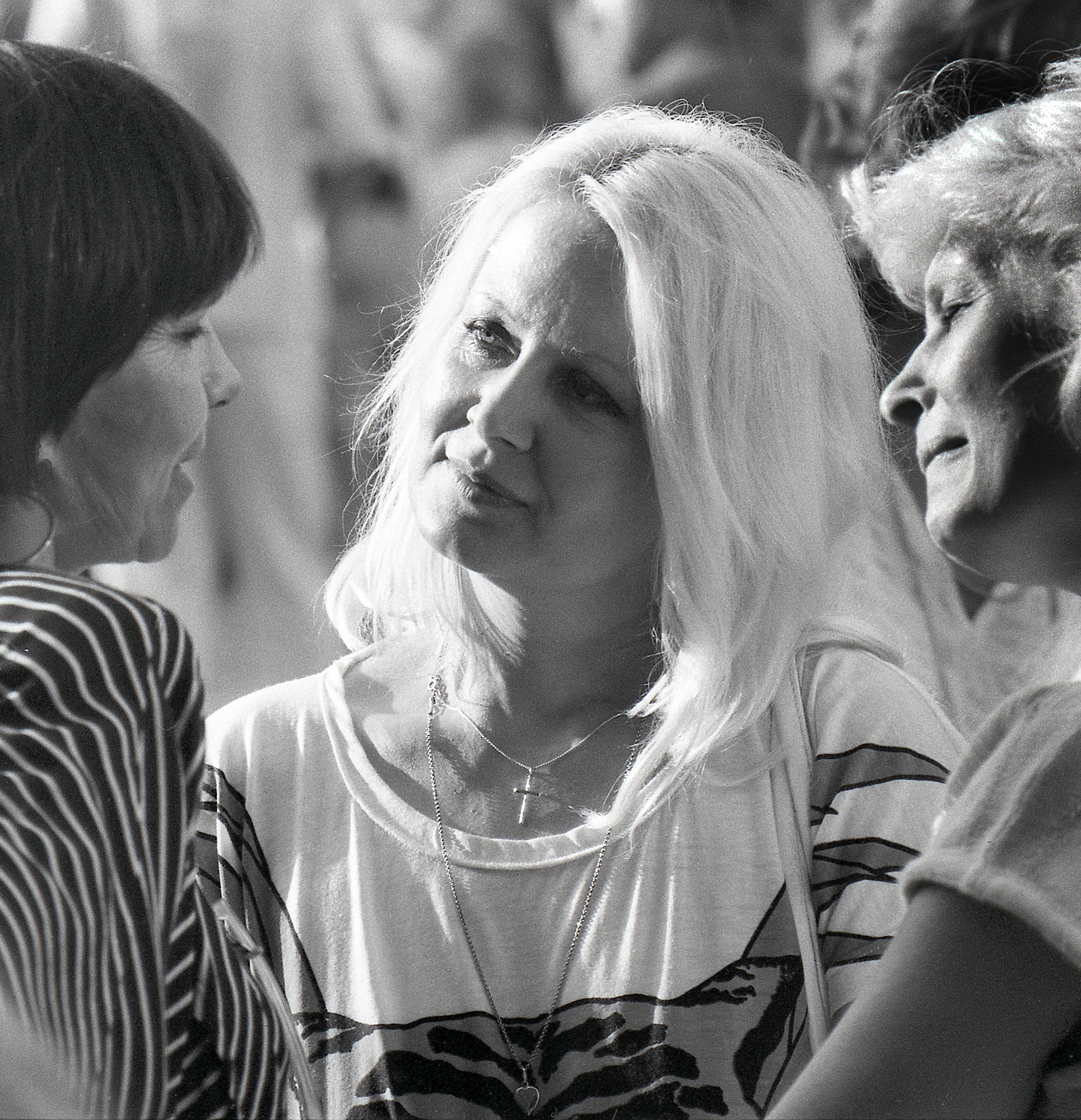
Eve Kivi in 1988

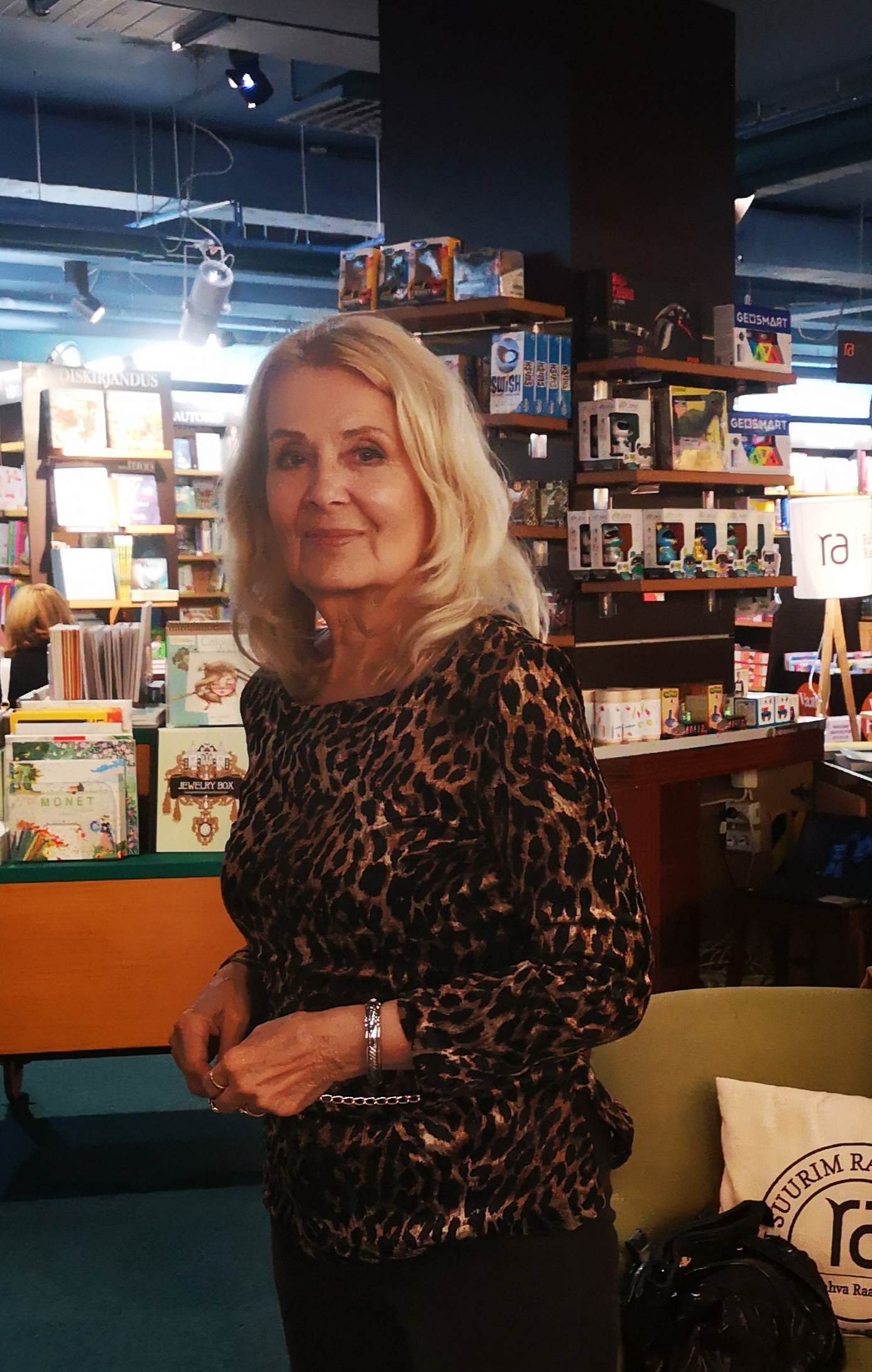
Eve Kivi in 2020

Eve Kivi (born Eeve Kivi on 8 May 1938) is an Estonian actress.

== Biography ==
In 1959 she graduated from the Estonian Drama Theatre's learning studio. She has worked at Tallinnfilm and Mosfilm. Since 1955 she has appeared in about 50 films.

From 1965 until 1972, she was married to speed skater Ants Antson.

Awards:

- 1983: Estonian SSR merited artist

== Selected filmography ==
- 1959 Vallatud kurvid (role: Evi)
- 1959 Sampo (role: Annikki)
- 1961 Ohtlikud kurvid (role: Evi)
- 1969 Viimne reliikvia (role: Ursula)
- 1974 Ohtlikud mängud (role: Vivian's mother)
- 1975 Briljandid proletariaadi diktatuurile (role: Woman at restaurant)
- 1975 It Can't Be! (role: wife of Ivan Izrailevich)
- 1992 Need vanad armastuskirjad (role: Alice's mother)
- 1994 Tulivesi (role: Lulu)

== See also ==
- Dean Reed
