= Sampo (film) =

1959 Soviet-Finnish fantasy film

- Soviet theatrical poster
- Directed by: Aleksandr Ptushko; Risto Orko
- Written by: Väinö Kaukonen; Viktor Vitkovich; Grigori Yagdfeld
- Based on: Kalevala by Elias Lönnrot
- Produced by: Risto Orko
- Starring: Urho Somersalmi; Ivan Voronov; Anna Orochko; Andris Ošiņš; Eve Kivi
- Cinematography: Gennadi Tsekavyj
- Edited by: I. Rostovtsev
- Music by: Igor Morozov
- Production companies: Mosfilm; Suomi-Filmi
- Release dates: 24 August 1959 (Soviet Union); 16 October 1959 (Finland); April 1964 (United States)
- Running time: 91 minutes (original); 67 minutes (U.S. version)
- Countries: Soviet Union; Finland
- Languages: Russian; Finnish; English (U.S. version)

Sampo (Russian: Сампо) is a 1959 Soviet-Finnish fantasy film based loosely on the events depicted in the Finnish national epic Kalevala. In the United States, it was released in an edited version, The Day the Earth Froze, by American International Pictures as a double feature with Conquered City. This version was later featured in a 1993 episode of Mystery Science Theater 3000.

== Plot ==
The people of Kalevala are a peaceful hard working people. They have everything they need and want, with one exception: the Sampo, a magical mill which will make grain, salt, and gold while giving prosperity to whoever possesses it. The only person in Kalevala able to make a Sampo is the smith, Ilmarinen. However, he cannot make it until his sister Annikki has fallen in love. Annikki eventually falls in love with the young hardworking Lemminkäinen. All is not perfect, however. There is a dark dismal land called Pohjola ruled over by a wicked witch called Louhi. She wishes for a Sampo, but her wizards are unable to forge one. Louhi is advised that only Ilmarinen can do so. Louhi sends her enchanted cloak to bring Annikki to Pohjola as ransom. Lemminkäinen runs to Ilmarinen to inform him his sister has been taken and vows to return her. Ilmarinen agrees to come with him. They set off on a boat constructed of an ancient oak tree.

On arrival, Louhi demands they complete a simple task each. Lemminkäinen is asked to plow a field of snakes, which he does with the aid of a steel horse made by Ilmarinen. After Louhi's wizards destroy their boat, blaming it on a great fish, Ilmarinen forges another ship from iron. The final task is set to Ilmarinen; he is to forge a Sampo. He sets to work and, after some failed bargaining for another task, and with the aid of the trolls of Pohjola on the bellows and the fire from heaven itself, he forges a beautiful Sampo, which immediately begins to make gold, grain, and salt.

Lemminkäinen and Ilmarinen are reunited with Annikki. They set sail for Kalevala. Lemminkäinen is upset when he is informed the people of Kalevala will never be able to reap the benefits of the Sampo. He dives into the sea to swim back and recover it. Back in Pohjola, Lemminkäinen releases the mist from the prison Louhi has placed it in, and it covers the whole land. When the mist clears, the Sampo has gone and Lemminkäinen is on a boat heading back to Kalevala. His boat is wrecked on the ocean surface when Louhi orders that the wind be set free. The Sampo is destroyed and Lemminkäinen presumed lost. He manages to swim back to Kalevala and returns a small piece of the Sampo, which Väinämöinen announces will bring great prosperity and joy to the people of the land. Lemminkäinen and Annikki marry and a great feast and dance is arranged. However, Louhi, angry at the betrayal, comes to Kalevala and steals their sun. Returning it to Pohjola, she locks it in a deep mountain cave.

Kalevala is plunged into perpetual darkness. However, Lemminkäinen is still hopeful. He asks Ilmarinen to forge a new sun. But wise old Väinämöinen informs him it's futile, that they must go to Pohjola and recover the sun by force. Väinämöinen tells the people this battle will be fought using kantele, not bladed weapons. The people of Kalevala prepare by cutting trees and bringing all precious metals to Ilmarinen to forge the strings. When Kalevala and Pohjola meet on a frozen lake for battle, Väinämöinen begins playing. The trolls of Louhi begin to drift to sleep. Louhi tries in vain to get them to fight, but she fails. Her trolls fall down unconscious. Louhi then sends her magic cape to kill the people of Kalevala, but it is beaten down into a hole in the ice. Lemminkäinen marches up to the mountain which contains the sun, and Louhi turns herself into stone in fear. Lemminkäinen slices the stone door of the mountain open with his sword, releasing the sun to shine over the lands of Kalevala.

The film ends with the people of Kalevala looking to the bright sky in wonder and happiness.

== Cast ==
- Andris Ošiņš as Lemminkäinen
- Eve Kivi as Annikki
- Anna Orochko as Louhi
- Ivan Voronov as Ilmarinen
- Urho Somersalmi as Väinämöinen
- Ada Vojtsik as Mother of Lemminkäinen
- Georgi Millyar as Sorcerer
- Mikhail Troyanovsky as Soothsayer
- Marvin Miller as Narrator (English dub)

== Production ==
The film was primarily a Soviet Mosfilm production. Finnish film companies were reluctant to participate, but Suomi-Filmi was eventually persuaded to join the production.

Each scene was shot a total of four times (using two cameras), as the film was produced in both Russian and Finnish (with dialogue dubbed afterwards) and in both standard and anamorphic widescreen aspect ratios. The film used the Sovcolor color film process. Sampo was the first Finnish film to feature surround sound, with four channels.

=== The Day the Earth Froze ===
The US version The Day the Earth Froze received 24 minutes of cuts, decreasing the 91 minute runtime to 67 minutes; its credits were heavily altered: the original credits were replaced with English language titles. For example, Ptushko was credited as 'Gregg Sebelious', Andris Oshin was listed as 'Jon Powers', and Eve Kivi was listed as 'Nina Anderson'.

Deleted scenes include:

- Lemminkäinen confronting Louhi and her trolls, being escorted to the Sampo and standing in awe. While he is in awe of the Sampo's beauty he is murdered by a serpent bite and thrown into the sea.
- Lemminkäinen's mother searching for her son, asking a birch tree, the mountain path and the sun. She then walks across the sea to Pohjola and confronts Louhi, who tells her he has left his tribesmen behind. Lemminkäinen's mother refuses to believe this and Louhi reluctantly tells her the truth. Lemminkäinen's mother asks the gods for help and Lemminkäinen is washed up on the shore, she carries him back to Kalevala. Upon arrival Lemminkäinen's mother rubs soil into his lips and the birch tree gives her its sap, then the Sun glows brightly and Lemminkäinen is restored to life.

== Critical reception ==
Writing in DVD Talk, film critic Glenn Erickson reported that the movie "has many impressive sets," that the "special effects are managed more through clever design than hi-tech means," and that the film's message is "that wishing for luxuries to make life easier is just asking for trouble and that people should stay in their little villages and stop grousing."

== Mystery Science Theater 3000 ==
Under the title The Day the Earth Froze, the film was featured in episode #422 of Mystery Science Theater 3000 (MST3K) premiering January 16, 1993, on Comedy Central. The episode also featured the short Here Comes the Circus. MST3K writer/performer Kevin Murphy expressed admiration for the film as the first in the "MST3K Russo-Finnish troika". He called the director "alternately a genius and a crazy person," although he admitted that could be an effect of the film's translation. He also wrote the film looks great for an MST3K entry, with "some stunning photography and special effects."

In his ranking of Mystery Science Theater 3000 episodes for Paste, writer Jim Vorel places The Day the Earth Froze at #93, (Note: Ranking based on 197 episodes as of 2018.) making it the worst ranking of the Russo-Finnish troika. Like the other two Russo-Finnish films by Aleksandr Ptushko—The Magic Voyage of Sinbad and The Sword and the Dragon—Vorel finds The Day the Earth Froze "quite colorful, easy to watch, goofy and occasionally nightmare-inducing, showcasing the somewhat bizarre sensibilities of a foreign entertainment market that we as Americans know next to nothing about."

Shout Factory released the episode on DVD as part of the box set Mystery Science Theater 3000: The 25th Anniversary Edition on December 10, 2013. The Day the Earth Froze disc includes the film's original trailer as bonus content. Other episodes included in the collection are Moon Zero Two (episode #111), Mitchell (episode #512), The Brain That Wouldn't Die (episode #513), The Leech Woman (episode #802), and Gorgo (episode #909).

== Home media ==
The Finnish version has been released on DVD in 2014. It was restored by Finnish National Audiovisual Institute in 2014 to digital 4K format. In July 2022 this restoration was released on Blu-ray by the Deaf Crocodile video label. The Finnish edit has also been released on the Elonet service.

The US version The Day the Earth Froze was released on DVD in 2004 by Retromedia in a double-feature with The Magic Voyage of Sinbad, the US version of Ptushko’s earlier fantasy epic Sadko.

The Russian version has not been released on videotape or DVD. On January 1, 2021, Mosfilm released the Russian edit on their official YouTube channel.

== See also ==
- List of Finnish films of the 1950s
- Kalevala: The New Era

== Sources ==
=== Further reading ===
- Harrivirta, Holger (1983). Lykättävät lyhdyt ja kannettavat kamerat: elokuvamiehen muistelmia (in Finnish). Suomen Elokuvasäätiö. ISBN 951-93-4926-X.
