= Anna Orochko =

Russian actress

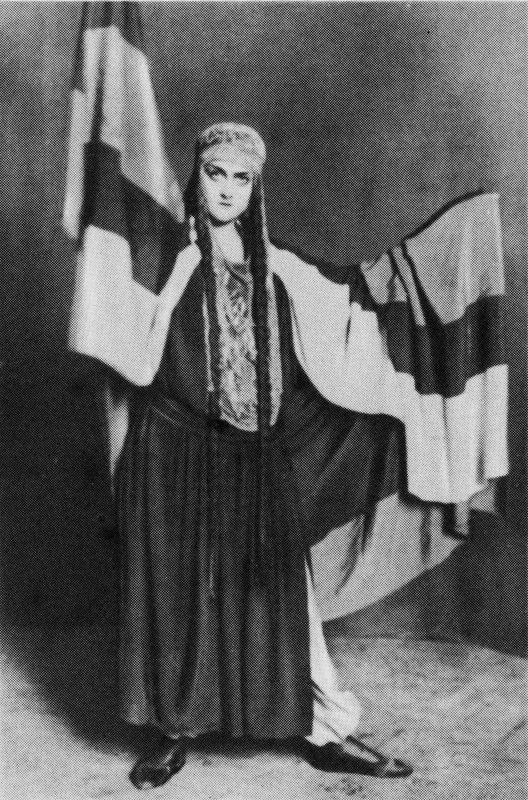
- Anna Orochko in Turandot (1922)
- Born: Anna Alekseyevna Orochko; 14 July 1898; Shushenskoye, Yeniseysk Governorate, Russian Empire
- Died: 26 December 1965 (aged 67); Moscow, Russian SFSR, Soviet Union
- Occupations: Actor, director, acting teacher

Anna Alekseyevna Orochko (Russian: А́нна Алексе́евна Оро́чкo) (14 July 1898 – 26 December 1965) was a Soviet Russian stage and film actress, theatrical director, and acting teacher.

== Life and career ==
Orochko was born in the village of Shushenskoye, Yeniseysk Governorate, where her family had been sent as political exiles. Anna's godparents were Vladimir Lenin and his wife Nadezhda Krupskaya, who had been exiled to the same village. Years later, visitors to Orochko's apartment would be puzzled to see portraits of Lenin and Krupskaya hanging among religious icons.

As a daughter of exiles, Orochko was forbidden to attend public schools under the Czarist regime. She graduated from a private high school in Tula in 1916. From 1916 to 1919 she studied agriculture in Moscow, at the same time pursuing a career in drama. In 1917 she was admitted to the Student Drama Studio under the direction of Yevgeny Vakhtangov, later founder of the Vakhtangov Theatre. Vakhtangov appreciated her abilities as a tragedian and cast her in many traditionally male roles, including Horatio and Hamlet.

During the Great Patriotic War, she performed for soldiers at the front lines, and was named a People's Artist of the Russian SFSR in 1947. In 1950 she received the Stalin Prize for her performance in Virta's "The Conspiracy of the Condemned".

Orochko is best remembered as an acting teacher and theatrical organizer. Beginning in 1922, she taught acting at the Vakhtangov School, later renamed the Boris Shchukin Theatre Institute. Her students included Vladimir Etush, Boris Khmelnitsky, Aleksandr Grave, and Alla Demidova. She was described as the "godmother" of the Taganka Theatre, because so many of its founding members had been her students. She died in Moscow and was buried at Novodevichy Cemetery.

== Stage roles ==
- 1922 – Turandot by Carlo Gozzi, directed by Yevgeny Vakhtangov – Adelma
- 1924 – Lev Gurych Sinichkin by Dmitry Lensky, directed by Ruben Simonov – Surmilova
- 1926 – Marion Delorme by Victor Hugo, directed by Ruben Simonov – Marion Delorme
- 1926 – Zoyka's Apartment by Mikhail Bulgakov, directed by Aleksei Popov – Alla Vadymivna
- 1930 – Intrigue and Love by Friedrich Schiller, directed by Pavel Antokolsky – Lady Milford
- 1932 – Hamlet by William Shakespeare, directed by Nikolay Akimov – Gertrude
- 1937 – Guilty Without Fault by Alexander Ostrovsky, directed Iosif Rapoport – Kruchinina
- 1941 – Before Sunrise by Gerhard Hauptmann, directed by Alexandra Remizova – unknown role
- 1944 – Rain by Alexander Ostrovsky, directed by Boris Zakhava – Madwoman
- 1946 – Electra, directed by Yevgeniya Gardt – Electra
- 1949 – Conspiracy of the Condemned by Nikolai Virta, directed by Ruben Simonov – Hanna Licht

== As director ==
- 1930 – Tempo by Nikolai Pogodin
- 1942 – The Immortal by Aleksei Arbuzov
- 1942 – Our Correspondent by Izrail Metter
- 1952 – The Two Gentlemen of Verona by Shakespeare

== Film roles ==
- 1918: Bread (directed by Boris Sushkevich) – Minor role
- 1959: Sampo (directed by Aleksandr Ptushko) – Louhi
- 1961: Scarlet Sails (directed by Aleksandr Ptushko) – Neighbor of Longren (final film role)
