= Ministry of Timber, Paper and Wood Processing Industry =

Government ministry of the Soviet Union

The Ministry of Timber, Paper and Wood Processing Industry (Russian: Министерство лесной и бумажной промышленности СССР) was a government ministry in the Soviet Union.

== History ==
The People's Commissariat of Cellulose and Paper Industry USSR was established by a ukase of 27 April 1950, and the appropriate offices and functions transferred to it from the jurisdiction of the People's Commissariat of Timber Industry USSR.

The People's Commissariat of Cellulose and Paper Industry USSR became the Ministry of Cellulose and Paper Industry USSR on 15 March 1946. On 29 July 1948, the Ministries of Cellulose and Paper Industry USSR and Ministry of Timber Industry USSR were combined into the Ministry of Timber and Paper Industry USSR. On 16 February 1951, the Ministry of Timber and Paper Industry USSR was divided into the union-republic Ministry of Timber Industry and the all-union Ministry of Paper and Wood-Processing Industry.

== List of ministers ==
People's Commissars for Cellulose & Paper Industry:

- Nikolai Tshebotarev (7.5.1941 - 1.1.1944)
- Georgi Orlov (1.1.1944 - 15.3.1946)

Ministers of Cellulose & Paper Industry:

- Georgi Orlov (19.3.1946 - 14.4.1947)
- Sergei Komarov (14.4.1947 - 1.12.1947)
- Leonid Gratchev (1.12.1947 - 24.7.1948)
- Ivan Voronov (16.2.1951 - 15.3.1953)

Ministers of Paper & Wood Processing Industry:

- Fjodor Varaksin (19.4.1954 - 13.7.1957)

Ministers of Cellulose & Paper Industry:

- Konstantin Galantshin (3.7.1968 - 23.10.1980)

Ministers of Timber, Paper & Wood Processing Industry:

- Stepan Shalajev (30.10.1980 - 1.4.1982)
- Mikhail Busygin (1.4.1982 - 17.7.1989)
