= Sergei Antonov =

Sergei Antonov (Bulgarian: Сергей Антонов) (11 July 1948 – 1 August 2007) was a Bulgarian airline representative accused of involvement in an assassination attempt against Pope John Paul II by Mehmet Ali Ağca in 1981.

Antonov, who worked as a Rome-based representative for Balkan Airlines, Bulgaria's national airline, was arrested in 1981 by Italian authorities and charged with complicity after the assassination attempt against Pope John Paul II by Turkish national Ağca on May 13, 1981. Pope John Paul II was seriously wounded but survived the shooting.

Antonov was placed on trial in Italy with three Turks and two other Bulgarians for the attack against the Pope. Ağca named Antonov as his co-conspirator before his conviction for attempted murder.

The case against Antonov fell apart. Italian prosecutors could not prove that the Bulgarian secret service had hired Ağca to assassinate the Pope at the behest of the Soviet Union, which feared the Polish Pope's influence in Communist Eastern Europe. Antonov was acquitted of the charges in 1986 following a two-year trial. The Italian court said that there was not enough evidence to support a conviction.

Antonov returned to Bulgaria following his acquittal. He refused to speak publicly about his time in prison. His mental and physical health rapidly declined and he spent rest of his life in isolation from others.

Bulgarian President Petar Stoyanov called for a legal exoneration of Antonov's reputation in 2000 saying that it was "important for the sake of clearing Bulgaria's image."

Pope John Paul II made his first and only official visit to Bulgaria in 2002. The Pope publicly rejected the allegations that Bulgaria's Communist government had been behind his 1981 attack and never believed in the Bulgarian connection.

Antonov was found dead in his Sofia, Bulgaria apartment in the summer of 2007. Doctors believe that he may have died of natural causes up to two days before he was found.
