= Igor Belousov =

Soviet politician (1928–2005)

Deputy Premier of the Soviet Union
- In office February 1988 – December 1990
- Premier: Nikolai Ryzhkov

Minister of the Shipbuilding Industry
- In office January 1984 – February 1988
- Premier: Nikolai Tikhonov; Nikolai Ryzhkov
- Preceded by: Mikhail Yegorov
- Succeeded by: Igor Koksanov

Personal details
- Born: Igor Sergeevich Belousov; 15 January 1928 Leningrad, Soviet Union
- Died: 10 February 2005 (aged 77) Moscow, Russia
- Resting place: Novodevichy Cemetery, Moscow
- Party: Communist Party
- Spouse: Veronika Panteleimonovna Belousova
- Education: Leningrad Shipbuilding Institute

Igor Belousov (Russian: Игорь Белоусов; 15 January 1928 – 10 February 2005) was a Russian statesman who held several posts in the Soviet era and after it. He was the Soviet minister of the shipbuilding industry and deputy premier in the 1980s.

== Early life and education ==
Belousov was born in Leningrad on 15 January 1928. In 1952 he graduated from the Leningrad Shipbuilding Institute receiving a degree in ship engineering.

== Career ==
From 1952 Belousov worked at the Baltic Shipyard S. Ordzhonikidze in Leningrad in different capacities. Then he became the secretary of its Komsomol committee and its chief engineer. He joined the Communist Party of the Soviet Union in 1955. From 1967 he worked as the chief engineer of the Admiralty Plant in Leningrad. In 1976 he was named the first deputy minister of the shipbuilding industry which he held until 1984. Between 1984 and 1989 Belousov served as a deputy at the Supreme Soviet and in the period 1986–1990 he was a member of the central committee of the Communist Party.

In January 1984 Belousov was appointed minister of the shipbuilding industry, replacing Mikhail Yegorov in the post. Belousov's tenure ended in February 1988 when he was replaced by Igor Koksanov in the post. Between February 1988 and December 1990 Belousov served as the deputy chairman of the council of ministers of the Soviet Union and the chairman of the state military industrial commission. In the period 2000–2005 he was the chief adviser to Rosoboronexport, a state agency for the exports and imports of defense-related products, technologies and services.

== Personal life and death ==
Belousov married Veronika Panteleimonovna Belousova (1928–2008). He died in Moscow on 10 February 2005 and was buried in the Novodevichy Cemetery, Moscow, where his wife would also be buried in 2008.

=== Awards ===
Belousov was the recipient of the following awards: Lenin Prize (three times), State Prize of the Soviet Union (1969), Order of the Red Banner of Labour (twice), Order of the Badge of Honour (twice) and the Hero of Socialist Labour (1974).
