= Ministry of Cotton Growing =

Government ministry of the Soviet Union

The Ministry of Cotton Growing (Khlopkovodstvo; Russian: Министерство хлопководства СССР) was a government ministry in the Soviet Union.

== History ==
The Ministry of Cotton Growing was established by a ukase of the Presidium of the Supreme Soviet USSR dated 5 April 1950 for the purpose of developing cotton growing.

The ministry was charged with the supervision of cotton production in kolkhozes and sovkhozes, as well as supervision of procurement and preliminary processing of cotton, and the construction and utilization of irrigation systems in all cotton-growing districts of the country.

Usman Yusupovich Yusupov was named Minister of Cotton Growing USSR by another ukase or the Presidium of the Supreme Soviet dated 5 April 1950.

== List of ministers ==
- Usman Yusupov (5.4.1950 - 15.3.1953)
