= Mikhail Nenashev =

Russian politician (1960–2021)

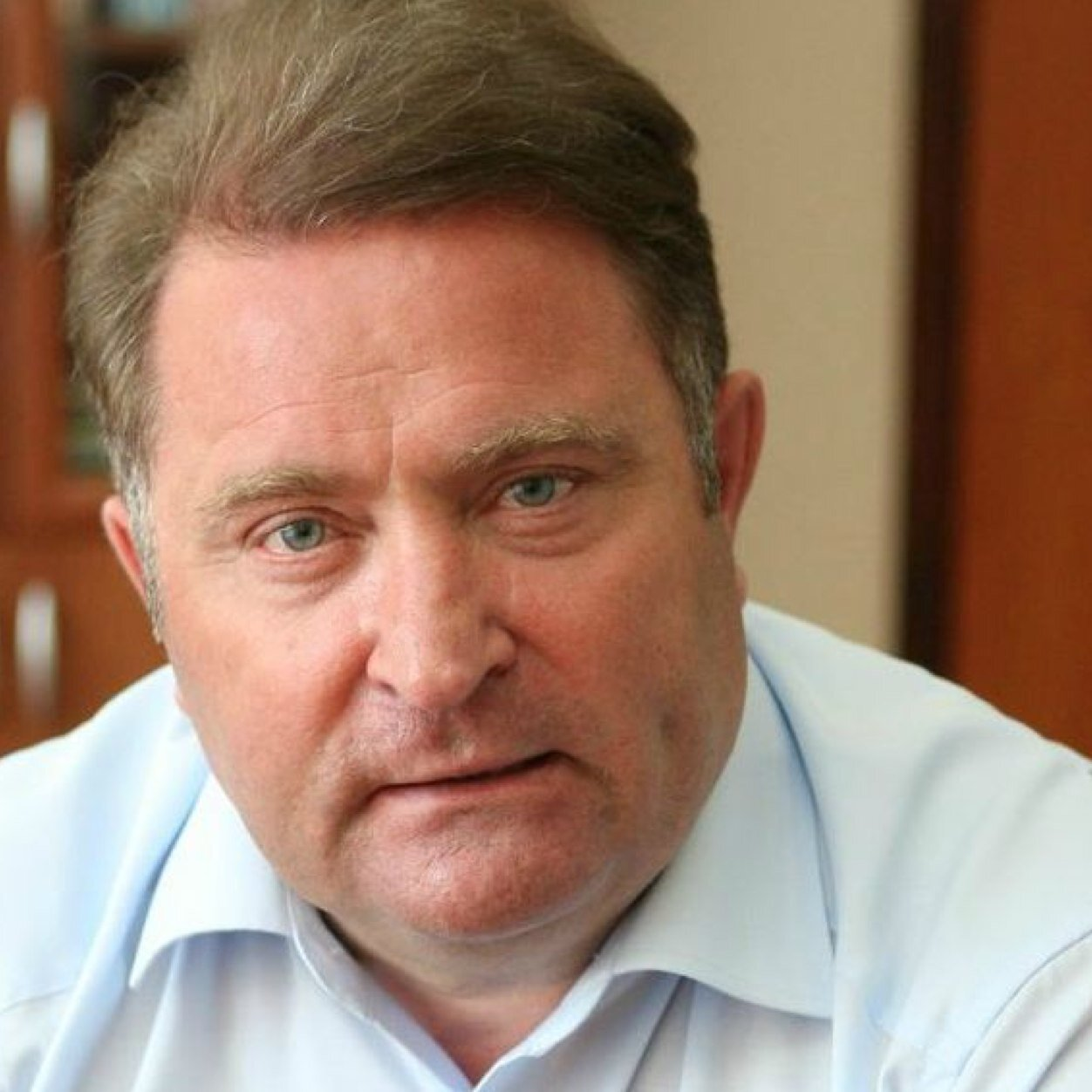

Member of the State Duma
- In office 24 December 2007 – 21 December 2011
- President: Vladimir Putin; Dmitry Medvedev

Personal details
- Born: 18 March 1960 Kozlovka, Voronezh Oblast, Russian SFSR, Soviet Union
- Died: 29 August 2021 (aged 61) Moscow, Russia
- Party: Party of Business

Mikhail Nenashev (Russian: Михаил Ненашев; 18 March 1960 – 29 August 2021) was a Russian politician. He served as Chairman of the All-Russian Fleet Support Movement and served in the 5th State Duma from 2007 to 2011. He was also a Captain 1st rank and served on the General Council of the Party of Business.

== Biography ==
Nenashev was born in Kozlovka on 18 March 1960. He graduated from Kiev Naval Political College and studied at the Lenin Military-Political Academy from 1990 to 1991. He then graduated from Moscow State University in 1993.

In 1978, Nenashev joined the Northern Fleet as a sailor. He then served as a lieutenant from 1983 to 1986 and subsequently became a Captain 3rd rank in 1991. He became a Captain 2nd rank in 1995 before becoming a Captain 1st rank in 1998. In September 1991, he founded what would become the All-Russian Fleet Support Movement. He was re-elected as Chairman six times.

Nenashev served in the 5th State Duma from 24 December 2007 to 21 December 2011. Although he was an independent, he was part of the United Russia faction. During his time in office, he served as the Chairman of the Subcommittee on Military-Technical Cooperation. Other political roles he held include Deputy Chairman of the Federal Agency for Maritime and River Transportation, Member of the Public Councils of the Ministry of Defence and the Ministry of Transport, Member of the Chamber of Commerce and Industry of the Russian Federation, Member of the Board of Trustees of Admiral Makarov State University of Maritime and Inland Shipping, and Member of the supervisory board of Saint Petersburg State Marine Technical University.

Mikhail Nenashev died of cardiac arrest in Moscow on 29 August 2021, at the age of 61.
