= Nikolai Pronin =

Russian ice hockey player

- Born: April 13, 1979 (age 45); Moscow, Russia
- Height: 5 ft 10 in (178 cm)
- Weight: 194 lb (88 kg; 13 st 12 lb)
- Position: Left wing
- Shoots: Left
- KHL team: HC CSKA Moscow
- NHL draft: Undrafted
- Playing career: 1995–present

Nikolai Pronin (born April 13, 1979) is a Russian professional ice hockey winger who currently plays for HC CSKA Moscow of the Kontinental Hockey League (KHL).

== Career statistics ==
			Regular season					Playoffs
Season	Team	League	GP	G	A	Pts	PIM	GP	G	A	Pts	PIM
1994–95	CSKA Moskva-2	Russia2	1	0	0	0	0	—	—	—	—	—
1995–96	CSKA Moscow	Russia	12	0	1	1	2	3	0	0	0	2
1995–96	CSKA Moscow-2	Russia2	32	8	6	14	10	—	—	—	—	—
1996–97	HC CSKA Moscow	Russia	42	5	5	10	12	2	1	0	1	2
1997–98	HC CSKA Moscow	Russia	26	1	1	2	8	—	—	—	—	—
1998–99	HC CSKA Moscow	Russia2	2	0	1	1	2	—	—	—	—	—
1998–99	Charlotte Checkers	ECHL	10	0	1	1	2	—	—	—	—	—
1998–99	Toledo Storm	ECHL	3	0	0	0	19	—	—	—	—	—
1998–99	Thunder Bay Thunder Cats	UHL	41	6	13	19	49	13	3	0	3	2
1999–00	HC CSKA Moscow	Russia2	43	21	12	33	45	—	—	—	—	—
1999–00	HC CSKA Moscow-2	Russia3	1	0	0	0	12	—	—	—	—	—
2000–01	HC CSKA Moscow	Russia2	38	24	12	36	34	—	—	—	—	—
2000–01	CSKA Moscow	Russia	10	1	1	2	2	—	—	—	—	—
2001–02	HC CSKA Moscow	Russia2	56	23	17	40	80	14	6	6	12	4
2002–03	CSKA Moscow	Russia	43	5	6	11	32	—	—	—	—	—
2003–04	CSKA Moscow	Russia	60	11	7	18	59	—	—	—	—	—
2004–05	CSKA Moscow	Russia	49	6	0	6	42	—	—	—	—	—
2004–05	CSKA Moscow-2	Russia3	1	1	0	1	2	—	—	—	—	—
2005–06	Khimik Mytishchi	Russia	51	8	8	16	60	9	2	3	5	6
2006–07	Khimik Mytishchi	Russia	46	12	10	22	32	9	2	2	4	12
2006–07	Khimik Mytishchi-2	Russia3	2	4	0	4	0	—	—	—	—	—
2007–08	Khimik Mytishchi	Russia	57	14	20	34	123	5	0	2	2	2
2008–09	Atlant Mytishchi	KHL	56	11	9	20	65	6	0	2	2	8
2009–10	Metallurg Magnitogorsk	KHL	53	7	4	11	30	10	0	0	0	26
2010–11	CSKA Moscow	KHL	40	4	2	6	20	—	—	—	—	—
2011–12	CSKA Moscow	KHL	52	0	1	1	48	4	0	0	0	9
2012–13	Rubin Tyumen	VHL	2	1	0	1	0	—	—	—	—	—
2012–13	Avtomobilist Yekaterinburg	KHL	49	3	4	7	52	—	—	—	—	—
2015–16	Zvezda Chekhov	VHL	39	7	1	8	26	—	—	—	—	—
2016–17	Zvezda Chekhov	VHL	49	8	4	12	40	5	0	0	0	4
Russia totals			396	63	59	122	372	57	10	10	20	71
KHL totals			250	25	20	45	215	20	0	2	2	43
