= Nikolay Koslov =

Soviet/Russian cross-country skier

Medal record

Men's cross-country skiing

World Championships
Silver medal – second place	1954 Falun	4 x 10 km

Nikolay Koslov (1928 – 2007) was a Soviet/Russian cross-country skier who competed in the 1950s. He won a silver medal in the 4 x 10 km at the 1954 FIS Nordic World Ski Championships.
