= Bryansky Uyezd =

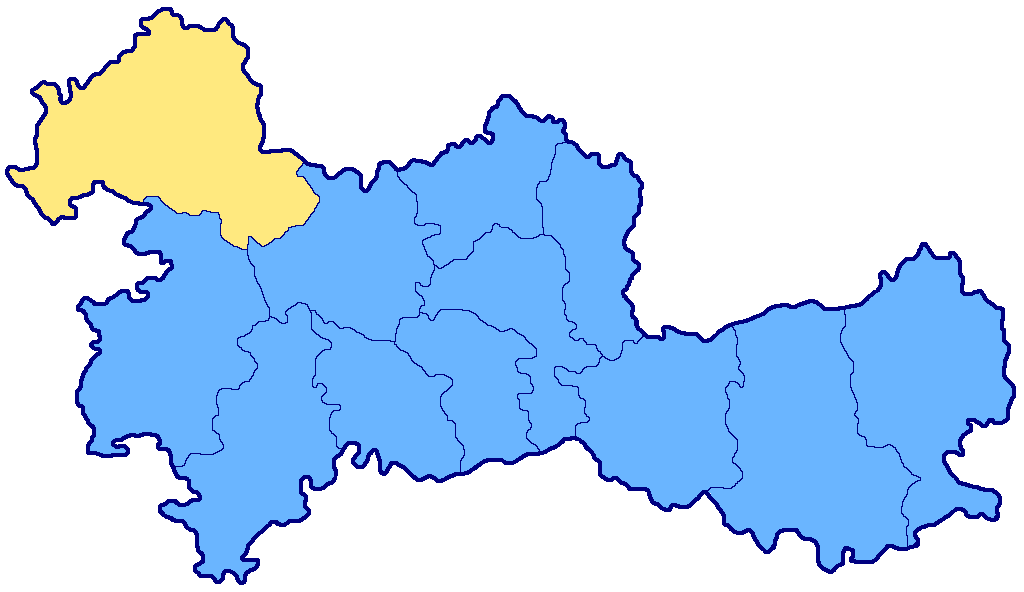

Bryansky Uyezd (Бря́нский уезд) was one of the subdivisions of the Oryol Governorate of the Russian Empire. It was situated in the northwestern part of the governorate. Its administrative centre was Bryansk.

== Demographics ==
At the time of the Russian Empire Census of 1897, Bryansky Uyezd had a population of 203,303. Of these, 97.0% spoke Russian, 1.0% Yiddish, 0.8% Belarusian, 0.5% Polish, 0.2% Ukrainian, 0.1% German, 0.1% Latvian and 0.1% Tatar as their native language.
