= Ivan Voronov =

Ivan Dmitrievich Voronov
- Born: Ivan Dmitrievich Voronov; 19 January 1915; Novy Milet village, Moscow Governorate, Russian Empire
- Died: 6 August 2004 (aged 89); Moscow, Russia
- Occupation: Actor
- Years active: 1954–1999
- Employer: Russian Academic Youth Theatre
- Known for: Theatre and film acting
- Awards: People's Artist of the RSFSR (1962); Honored Artist of the RSFSR (1952); Stalin Prize (1946, 1950); Order of the Badge of Honour (1967); Stanislavsky State Prize (1985); Medal of the Order "For Merit to the Fatherland", 1st class (2002); Medal of the Order "For Merit to the Fatherland", 2nd class (1997)

Ivan Dmitrievich Voronov (19 January 1915, Novy Milet – 6 August 2004, Moscow) was a Soviet and Russian theatre and film actor. He was a two-time recipient of the Stalin Prize (1946, 1950) and was named People's Artist of the RSFSR in 1962. To international audiences, he is best known for his role in the Soviet–Finnish film Sampo.

== Biography ==
Ivan Voronov was born on 19 January 1915 in the village of Novy Milet (now in Moscow Oblast). He studied at the Vsevolod Meyerhold Theatre School and, after his second year, was transferred to the company of the Meyerhold Theatre.

After the theatre was dissolved, Voronov performed at the State Central Theatre for Young Spectators. From 1942 to 1944, he was an actor with the Komsomol Youth Front Theatre under the Union of Theatre Workers of the Russian Federation. From 1944 onward, he served at the Central Children's Theatre (later RAMT).

Voronov died on 6 August 2004 and was buried at Vagankovo Cemetery in Moscow.

His son, Nikita Ivanovich Voronov (1950–2015), was a screenwriter and documentary film director. He directed the autobiographical film Hours and Years about his family.

== Filmography ==
- Dangerous Paths (1954) — Mayboroda
- In Square 45 (1955) — Saboteur
- Early Joys (1956) — Polotentsev
- The Mistress of the Inn (1956) — Count Albafiorita
- An Unusual Summer (1957) — Polotentsev
- Stories About Lenin (1957) — Grigory Belov
- Sampo (1958) — Ilmarinen
- At the Beginning of the Century (1961) — Gendarmerie Colonel
- Monday Is a Hard Day (1963) — Yuri Khristoforov
- Wizard Island (1964) — Foreign Ship Captain
- Mitya (1967, TV play) — Dudarov
- Three Days of Viktor Chernyshov (1967) — Episode
- Knight of Dreams (1968) — Reg
- Free Hour (1972, TV play) — Potekhin’s Father
- Pushkin Fairy Tales (1973) — Tsar
- Treating with Rowanberries (1976, TV play)
- Ramayana (1976, TV play) — Ravana
- Colonel Zorin’s Version (1978) — Fyodor Baranko
- Risk Strategy (1978) — Zhuravlyov
- Rules of the Game (1978, TV play) — Pudyshev
- Air Crew (1979) — Sergey Nikolayevich
- An Ideal Husband (1980) — Mason
- Appointment (1980) — Yuri Lyamin
- A Dangerous Age (1981) — Minister
- From Winter to Winter (1981) — Conference Participant
- Investigation Led by Experts: He Is Somewhere Here (1982) — Dmitry Savelyevich
- Mikhail Lomonosov (1986) — Gerhard Friedrich Müller

== Theatre ==
Voronov performed extensively at the Russian Academic Youth Theatre, including roles such as:

- Lyapkin-Tyapkin — The Government Inspector by Nikolai Gogol
- Famusov — Woe from Wit by Alexander Griboyedov
- Nozdryov — Dead Souls by Nikolai Gogol
- Karakol — City of Craftsmen by Tamara Gabbe
- Jean Valjean — Les Misérables by Victor Hugo
- Boris Godunov — Boris Godunov by Alexander Pushkin
- Prostakov — The Minor by Denis Fonvizin
- Kochkaryov — Marriage by Nikolai Gogol

== Awards and honors ==
- Stalin Prize (Second Class, 1946) — for City of Craftsmen
- Stalin Prize (Third Class, 1950) — for I Want to Go Home
- Honored Artist of the RSFSR (1952)
- People's Artist of the RSFSR (1962)
- Order of the Badge of Honour (1967)
- Stanislavsky State Prize (1985) — for Les Misérables
- Medal of the Order "For Merit to the Fatherland", 2nd class (1997)
- Medal of the Order "For Merit to the Fatherland", 1st class (2002)
