= Oleg Shishkin (politician) =

Soviet engineer

Oleg Nikolaevich Shishkin
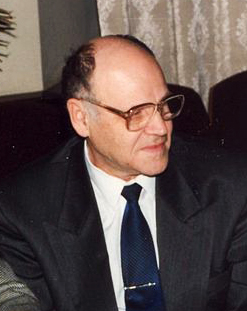
- Oleg Shishkin at the International Leonardo Prize ceremony

Minister of General Mechanical Engineering of the USSR
- In office July 17, 1989 – August 28, 1991 *(acting until November 26, 1991)
- Premier: Nikolai Ivanovich Ryzhkov
- Preceded by: Vitaly Husseynovich Doguzhiev
- Succeeded by: Position abolished

Personal details
- Born: June 26, 1934 (age 91) Sudogda, Ivanovo Industrial Region (now Vladimir Oblast)
- Party: Communist Party of the Soviet Union (1956-1991)
- Education: Moscow Electrotechnical Institute of Communications (1957)
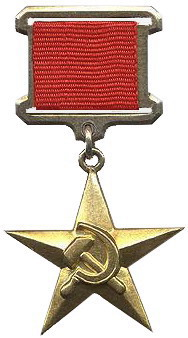
- Awards

Oleg Shishkin (born June 26, 1934, in Sudogda, Ivanovo Industrial Region, now Vladimir Oblast) was a politician who served as Minister of General Mechanical Engineering of the USSR.

== Biography ==
- 1952–1957: Student at the Moscow Electrotechnical Institute of Communications.
- 1957–1960: Junior Researcher at the Central Scientific Research Institute No. 22 of the Ministry of Defense of the USSR.
- 1960–1962: Senior Engineer at NII-88 in Kaliningrad, Moscow Oblast.
- 1962–1963: First Secretary of the Komsomol (VLKSM) in Kaliningrad, head of the industrial and transport department of the Komsomol in the Moscow Oblast.
- 1963–1965: Deputy Head of the NII-88 department.
- 1965–1966: Secretary of the Komsomol in Kaliningrad.
- 1966–1977: Director of the Institute of Measurement Technology of the Ministry of General Mechanical Engineering of the USSR.
- 1977: Director and Chief Designer of the NII of Precision Instruments of the Ministry of General Mechanical Engineering of the USSR.
- 1977–1981: General Director and Chief Designer of the Scientific-Production Association of Precision Instruments of the Ministry of General Mechanical Engineering of the USSR.
- From 1981 in the apparatus of the Ministry of General Mechanical Engineering of the USSR: Deputy Minister, and from 1987, First Deputy Minister.
- 1989–1991: Minister of General Mechanical Engineering of the USSR.
- 1991–1994: President of Rosobshchemash.

He retired in 1994.

== Awards and decorations ==
- Hero of Socialist Labor (1982)
- Orders of Lenin x 2 (1975, 1982)
- Order of the Red Banner of Labor (1966)
- Lenin Prize (1986)
- State Prize of the Russian Federation named after Yuri Gagarin in the field of space activities (2011) - for the development of the rocket and space industry, organization of space activities and the use of its results in the interests of science, ensuring socio-economic development and defense capability of the country.

== Sources ==
- "State Power of the USSR. Supreme Authorities and Their Leaders. 1923–1991: Historical and Biographical Directory" / Compiled by V. I. Ivkin. – Moscow, 1999. – ISBN 5-8243-0014-3.
