= Ministry of Grain Products =

Government ministry of the Soviet Union

The Ministry of Grain Products (Minkhleboproduktov; Russian: Министерство хлебопродуктов СССР) was a government ministry in the Soviet Union.

Originally established from parts of the Ministry of Agriculture in 1953, the Ministry of Procurement received its title in 1969. In December 1985, the name of the Ministry of Procurement was changed to the Ministry of Grain Products. In addition to its former responsibilities, the new ministry oversaw all bread and macaroni production.

== List of ministers ==
- Mikhail Popov (15.1.1938 - 21.8.1938)
- Semjon Skrynnikov (21.8.1938 - 4.4.1940)
- Vladimir Donskoi (4.4.1940 - 5.7.1941)
- Klavdi Subbotin (5.7.1941 - 15.3.1946)
- Boris Dvinski (19.3.1946 - 27.10.1950)
- Panteleimon Ponomarenko (27.10.1950 - 15.3.1953)
- Leonid Kornijec (21.11.1953 - 26.10.1958)
- Grigori Zolotukhin (26.7.1974 - 6.4.1987)
- Aleksandr Budyka (6.4.1987 - 17.7.1989)
