= Ministry of Defense Industry (Soviet Union) =

Soviet government ministry

The Ministry of Defense Industry (Minoboronprom; Russian: Министерство оборонной промышленности СССР) was a government ministry in the Soviet Union, established on 8 December 1936.

== History ==
It was originally established on 8 December 1936 as the People's Commissariat of Defence Industry of the USSR on the basis of the People's Commissariat of Heavy Industry of the USSR. On 11 January 1939, a decree of the Presidium of the Supreme Soviet of the USSR divided the People's Commissariat of Defence Industry into four departments: the People's Commissariat of Aviation Industry, People's Commissariat of the Shipbuilding Industry, People's Commissariat of Arms and People's Commissariat of Munitions.

The ministry was re-established on 2 March 1965 from the State Committee for Defense Technology. It was responsible for conventional ground forces weapons, solid propellant missiles and optical systems.

== Headquarters ==
The seat was located in Moscow at the Ulanski alley (Уланский переулок) 16 and 22 in the building (designed by DF Fridman) built in 1936 for the purpose of Metrostroy (Мосметрострой) tube building company. Since 1939 the building was the headquarters of the People's Commissariat of Aviation Industry (Народный комиссариат авиационной промышленности – Наркомавиапром). The phone book does not indicate the address of the Ministry.

== List of ministers ==
- Dmitry Ustinov (6 March 1953 – 14 December 1957)
- Sergei Zverev (2 October 1963 – 17 December 1978)
- Pavel Finogenov (29 January 1979 – 17 July 1989)
- Boris Belousov (17 July 1989 – 24 October 1991)
