= Nikolai Kotlyar =

Soviet politician (1935–2003)

- Николай Котляр

Minister of Electrical Equipment Industry
- In office 8 January 1987 – August 1991
- Preceded by: Vladimir Kamentsev
- Succeeded by: Office abolished

Personal details
- Born: 5 May 1935
- Died: 9 October 2003 (aged 68) Moscow, Russia
- Resting place: Moscow
- Party: Communist Party
- Education: Far Eastern Technical Institute; Academy of National Economy

Nikolai Isaakovich Kotlyar (Russian: Николай Исаакович Котляр; 5 May 1935 – 9 October 2003) was a Soviet engineer, maritime specialist and politician who was the last minister of the fishing industry.

== Early life and education ==
Nikolai Kotlyar was born on 5 May 1935. He was a graduate of the Far Eastern Technical Institute of Fishing Industry and Economy where he obtained a degree in mechanical engineering. He also attended the Academy of National Economy in 1980.

== Career and activities ==
Kotlyar was a member of the Communist Party. Following his graduation he worked as an engineer at a fishery in the maritime territory. He also served in several Party organs and then at various units of the Dalryba association which was responsible for the fishery activities near to Japan. In 1977 he was appointed head of the department for active sea fishing at Primorrybprom.

Kotlyar was named as the minister of the fishing industry on 8 January 1987. He replaced Vladimir Kamentsev in the post. Kotlyar's term was extended in July 1989. He was removed from the office by Boris Yeltsin in August 1991 when he and his deputies supported the dissidents and ordered the fishermen to follow them. Upon this incident the ministry was also disestablished and the ministry staff was attached to the ministry of agriculture.

He died in Moscow on 9 October 2003.

== Awards ==
Kotlyar was the recipient of the following:

- Order of Lenin
- Order of the October Revolution
- Order of the Red Banner of Labour
