= People's Commissariat of Munitions =

The People's Commissariat of Munitions of the USSR (Russian: Народный комиссариат боеприпасов - НКБ), was one of the central ministries of the Soviet Government, who oversaw production of the armaments industry, mainly ammunition and explosives.

The seat was located in Moscow at Kirov St. (ул. Кирова) 29 (now of Miasnickaya St. - Мясницкая).

== History ==
On 11 January 1939 the People's Commissariat of Defence Industry of the USSR (Народный комиссариат оборонной промышленности) was divided into several departments, among which was the People's Commissariat of Munitions (shortened to NKB in Russian).

It oversaw the work of 53 production plants and 12 design offices, five construction companies, 5 universities and 11 technical schools. In 1939 it employed 337,141 workers.

On 7 January 1946 the commissariat was renamed People's Commissariat of Agricultural Engineering of the USSR (Наркомат сельскохозяйственного машиностроения CCCP), before being transformed into a Ministry later that year.

== Ministers ==
- Ivan P. Sergeev (11.1.1939 - 8.3.1941)
- Pytor Goremykin (8.3.1941 - 16.2.1942)
- Boris Vannikov (16.2.1942 - 7.1.1946)

== See also ==
- OKB → experimental design bureau (Опытное конструкторское бюро - ОКБ)
