= Ministry of Building of Military and Naval Enterprises =

Government ministry of the Soviet Union

The People's Commissariat for the Building of Military and Naval Enterprises (Russian: Народный комиссариат по строительству военных и военно-морских предприятий - НКСВВМП) was one of the central offices of the Soviet Union. It oversaw military construction.

The Ministry was established on 19 January 1946 in a split from the People's Commissariat for Building (Народный комиссариат по строительству СССР). In June 1946 it changed its name to the Ministry of the Building of Military and Naval Enterprises (Министерство по строительству военных и военно-морских предприятий СССР - Минвоенморстрой), and functioned until 9 March 1949, when it was dissolved.

== List of ministers ==
- Semjon Ginsburg (19.3.1946 - 19.6.1947)
- Nikolai Dygai (19.6.1947 - 9.3.1949)
