= Vsevolod Murakhovsky =

Ukrainian-Soviet politician (1926–2017)

- Всеволод Мураховский

First Deputy Chairman of the Council of Ministers
- In office 1 November 1985 – 7 June 1989
- Prime Minister: Nikolai Ryzhkov

First Secretary of the Stavropol Regional Committee of the Communist Party
- In office 4 December 1978 – November 1985
- Preceded by: Mikhail Gorbachev
- Succeeded by: Ivan Boldyrev

First Secretary of the Karachay-Cherkessia Regional Committee of the Communist Party
- In office 25 June 1975 – 16 December 1978
- Preceded by: Fyodor Burmistrov
- Succeeded by: Alexei Inzhievsky

Personal details
- Born: Vsevolod Serafimovich Murakhovsky; 20 October 1926 Golubovskiy Rudnik, Ukrainian SSR, Soviet Union
- Died: 12 January 2017 (aged 90) Moscow, Russia
- Party: Communist Party of the Soviet Union (1946-1989)
- Education: Stavropol Pedagogical Institute

Vsevolod Serafimovich Murakhovsky (Russian: Всеволод Серафимович Мураховский; 20 October 1926 – 12 January 2017) was a Ukrainian-Soviet politician who served as first deputy premier during the leadership of Soviet general secretary Mikhail Gorbachev.

== Early life and education ==
Murakhovsky hailed from a Ukrainian family. He was born in a village, Holubivka, near Kreminna (Luhansk Oblast), on 20 October 1926. He attended Stavropol Pedagogical Institute and graduated in 1954.

== Career ==
Murakhovsky served in the Soviet Army from 1944 to 1950. In 1946, he joined the Communist Party. Then he worked as a communist party officer in the Stavropol region from 1954 to 1985. He was first secretary of the Stavropol Party gorkom in the period 1970-1974 and first secretary of the Karachai-Cherkessia Party obkom between 1975 and 1978. He also served as the first secretary of the Stavropol Komsomol Committee. He replaced Mikhail Gorbachev as first secretary of party's regional committee when the latter was appointed to party's central committee secretariat in Moscow in 1978. In 1981, Murakhovsky became a full member of the party's central committee.

Murakhovsky's term as first secretary of the Stavropol Komsomol Committee ended in November 1985 when he was appointed by Mikhail Gorbachev as one of the three first deputy premiers. It was his first post in Soviet administration. Murakhovsky was in charge of agriculture and related affairs and was also appointed chairman of the state committee for the agro-industrial complex, Gosagroprom, which was abolished in 1989. The reason for its disestablishment was its proven inefficiency for which Gorbachev criticised Murakhovsky. Murakhovsky's term also ended in 1989.

== Death ==
Murakhovsky died on 12 January 2017, aged 90.
