= Boris Belousov (politician) =

Soviet politician (1934–2026)

- Борис Белоусов

Minister of Defense Industry
- In office 17 July 1989 – 24 August 1991
- Premier: Nikolai Ryzhkov
- Preceded by: Pavel Finogenev
- Succeeded by: Office abolished

Minister of Machine Building
- In office 7 June 1987 – 17 July 1989
- Premier: Nikolai Ryzhkov
- Preceded by: Vjatsheslav Bakhirov
- Succeeded by: Office abolished

Personal details
- Born: Boris Mikhailovich Belousov; 18 June 1934 Goryachy Klyuch, Azov-Black Sea Krai, Russian SFSR, Soviet Union
- Died: January 2026 (aged 91)
- Party: Communist Party
- Education: Taganrog Radio Technical Institute

Boris Mikhailovich Belousov (Russian: Борис Михайлович Белоусов; 18 June 1934 – January 2026) was a Soviet politician who held different cabinet posts, including Minister of Defense Industry from July 1989 to August 1991.

== Early life and education ==
Belousov was born in 1934. He received a degree in electronic engineering from the Taganrog Radio Technical Institute.

== Career ==
Belousov was a member of the Communist Party. He worked in Izhevsk in the field of general machine-building. He served as the department head at the Udmur Obkom and director of the Izhevsk mechanical plant.

In 1980 Belousov was appointed deputy minister of defense industry which he held until 1985. Between 1985 and 1987 he served as the first deputy minister of defense industry. In 1987 he was appointed the minister of machine building and served in the post until 1989. Next he was appointed the minister of defense industry in July 1989 replacing Pavel Finogenev in the post and served in the cabinet led by Prime Minister Nikolai Ryzhkov. Belousov's tenure as minister of defense industry ended in August 1991 when the ministry was also disestablished.

== Death ==
Belousov died in January 2026, at the age of 91.
