= Ministry of the Shipbuilding Industry (Soviet Union) =

Soviet government agency

The People's Commissariat of the Shipbuilding Industry of the USSR (Народный комиссариат судостроительной промышленности CCCP) was one of the central offices in the Soviet Union, the equivalent of a ministry, which oversaw the production of shipbuilding.

On January 11, 1939 the current People's Commissariat of Defence Industry of the USSR (Народный комиссариат оборонной промышленности) was divided into several departments, including II Main Board responsibility for shipbuilding, transformed into the People's Commissariat of the Shipbuilding Industry.

Resort oversaw the work of 41 shipyards and manufacturing plants, also 10 design offices. In 1939 it employed 173,284 workers.

March 15, 1946 the office was renamed the Ministry of Shipbuilding Industry of the USSR (Министерство судостроительной промышленности CCCP; Minsudprom).

== Headquarters ==
Commissariat of the shipbuilding industry he was building (arch. О. W. von Dessin, build 1912–1916) of ex-Institute of Foreign Languages in the Petroverigsky lane (Петроверигский пер.) 10. Three boards were placed in a five-storey building at the end of the Rozhdestvenka St. (Рождественка). The phone book does not indicate the address of the Ministry.

== List of ministers ==
- Ivan Tervosyan (11.1.1939 - 17.4.1940)
- Ivan Nosenko (17.4.1940 - 15.3.1946)
- Aleksei Goreglyad (19.3.1946 - 10.1.1950)
- Vjatsheslav Malyshev (10.1.1950 - 15.3.1953)
- Ivan Nosenko (27.4.1954 - 2.8.1956)
- Andrei Redkin (15.9.1956 - 14.12.1957)
- Boris Butoma (31.3.1958 - 19.7.1976)
- Mikhail Yegorov (19.7.1976 - 10.1.1984)
- Igor Belousov (10.1.1984 - 13.2.1988)
- Igor Koksanov (20.2.1988 - 24.8.1991)

== See also ==
- OKB – experimental design bureau (Опытное конструкторское бюро – ОКБ)

== Bibliography ==
- Наркомат судостроительной промышленности
