= Ministry of Radio Technology (Soviet Union) =

Ministry of Radio Technology of the USSR
- Министерство радиопромышленности СССР
- All ministry seals of the Soviet Union used the State Emblem

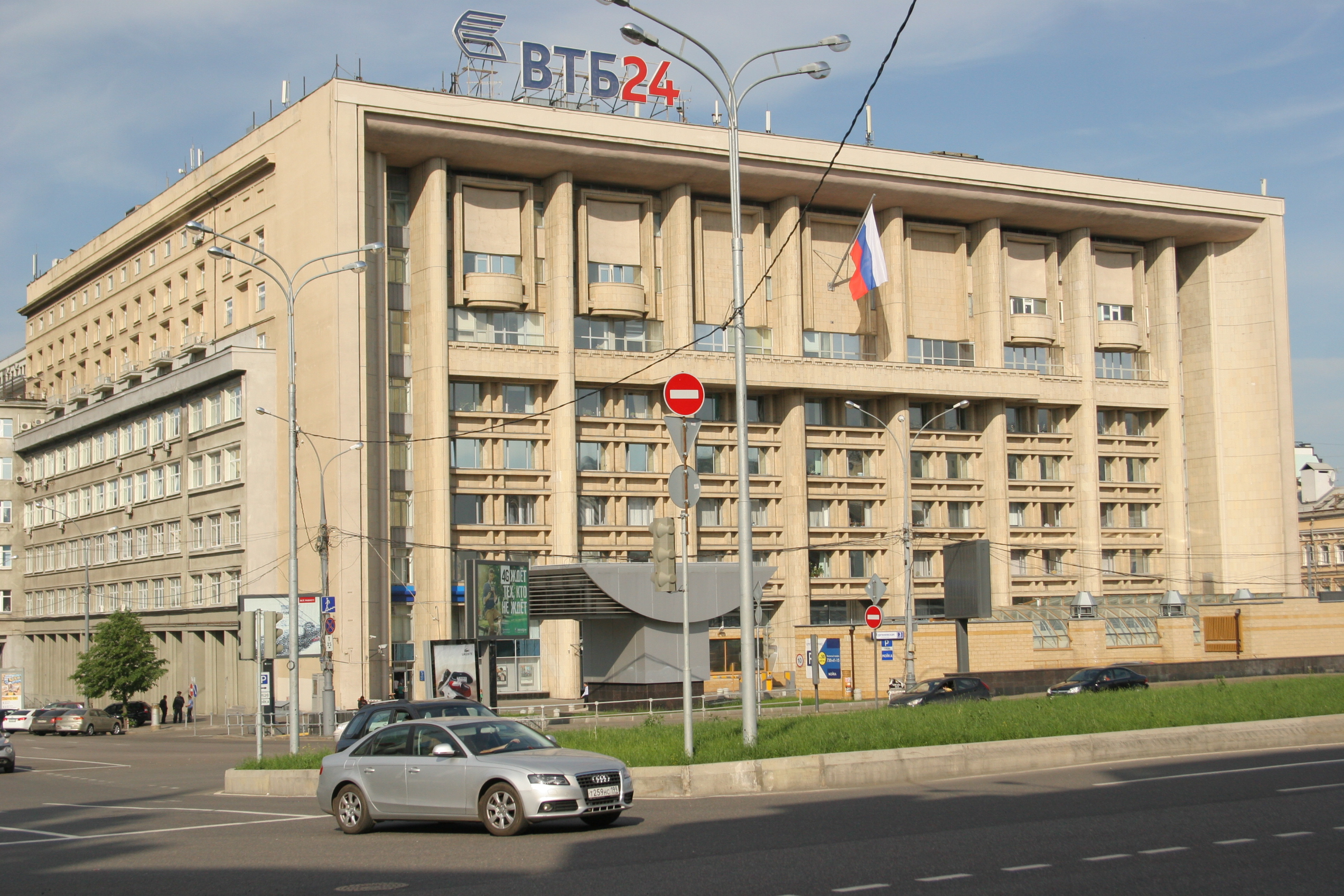
- Former Minradioprom building in Moscow

Agency overview
- Formed: 21 January 1954
- Dissolved: 24 August 1991
- Jurisdiction: Government of the Soviet Union
- Headquarters: Moscow

The Ministry of Radio Technology (Minradioprom; Russian: Министерство радиопромышленности) was a government ministry in the Soviet Union.

Established as Ministry of Radiotechnical Industry in 1954, under present name since 1965; involved in research and production of television sets, radios, tape recorders, computers, radio instruments, and other electronic gear. In the 1980s it became a major producer of Soviet personal computers, including the Agat, ES-184x and PKSOxx.

== List of ministers ==
- Valeri Kalmykov (21.1.1954 - 8.4.1974)
- Pjotr Pleshakov (8.4.1974 - 11.9.1987)
- Vladimir Shimko (14.11.1987 - 24.8.1991)
