= Ministry of the Fishing Industry =

Government ministry of the Soviet Union

The Ministry of Fish Industry (Minrybprom; Russian: Министерство рыбной промышленности) was a government ministry in the Soviet Union responsible for providing the state policies on the fisheries industry.

== History ==
The People's Commissariat of Fish Industry USSR was established by the ukase of the Presidium Supreme Soviet USSR of 19 January 1939, which divided the People's Commissariat of Food Industry USSR into People's Commissariats of Fish Industry, Food Industry, and Meat and Dairy Industry.

On 15 March 1946, the People's Commissariat of Fish Industry USSR became the Ministry of Fish industry USSR. On 8 May 1946, the Ministry of Fish Industry USSR was divided by ukase of the Presidium, Supreme Soviet USSR, into a Ministry of Fish Industry of Eastern Regions USSR and a Ministry of Fish Industry of Western Regions USSR.

On 28 December 1948, the Ministry of Fish Industry of Eastern Regions USSR and the Ministry of Fish Industry of Western Regions USSR were consolidated into the Ministry of Fish Industry USSR by ukase of the Presidium, Supreme Soviet USSR.

In August 1991 Nikolai Kotlyar and his deputy ministries supported the dissidents and ordered the fishermen to follow them. Upon this incident the ministry was disestablished, and the ministry staff was attached to the ministry of agriculture.

== List of ministers ==
- Polina Zhemtshuzhina (19.1.1939 - 1.7.1940)
- Aleksandr Ishkov (1.7.1940 - 8.5.1946)
- Konstantin Rusakov (5.2.1950 - 1.1.1952)
- Dmitri Pavlov (1.1.1952 - 15.3.1953)
- Aleksandr Ishkov (6.4.1954 - 6.2.1978)
- Vladimir Kamentsev (14.2.1979 - 1.9.1986)
- Nikolai Kotlyar (8.1.1987 - 24.8.1991)
