= Malenkov's first government =

Government of the Soviet Union

- 14th government of the Soviet Union

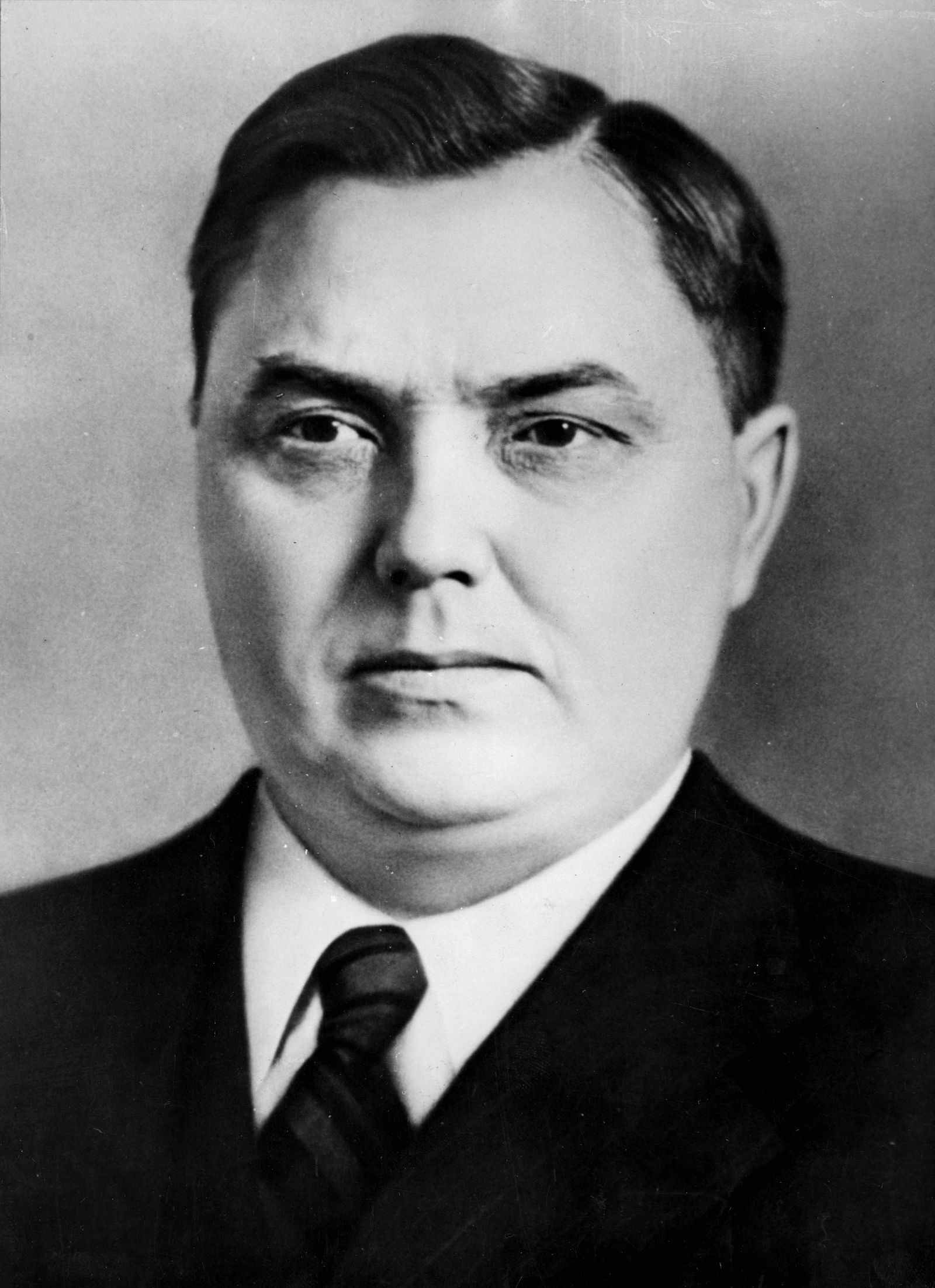
- Date formed: 6 March 1953
- Date dissolved: 27 April 1954

People and organisations
- Head of state: Kliment Voroshilov
- Head of government: Georgy Malenkov
- Deputy head of government: Lavrenti Beria
- No. of ministers: 51
- Member parties: CPSU
- Status in legislature: One Party State

History
- Election: 1950 Soviet Union legislative election
- Outgoing election: 1954 Soviet Union legislative election
- Predecessor: Stalin III
- Successor: Malenkov II

Malenkov's first government was created on 6 March 1953 and was dissolved on 27 April 1954, with the creation of Malenkov's second government.

== Ministries ==
The government consisted of:

Ministry	Minister	Took office	Left office
Chairman of the Council of Peoples' Commissars	Georgy Malenkov	6 March 1953	27 April 1954
First Deputy chairman of the Council of Peoples' Commissars	Lavrenti Beria	6 March 1953	26 June 1953
Deputy chairman of the Council of Peoples' Commissars	Vyacheslav Molotov	6 March 1953	27 April 1954
Deputy chairman of the Council of Peoples' Commissars	Nikolai Bulganin	6 March 1953	27 April 1954
Deputy chairman of the Council of Peoples' Commissars	Anastas Mikoyan	6 March 1953	27 April 1954
Deputy chairman of the Council of Peoples' Commissars	Lazar Kaganovich	6 March 1953	27 April 1954
Deputy chairman of the Council of Peoples' Commissars	Aleksei Kosygin	6 March 1953	27 April 1954
Deputy chairman of the Council of Peoples' Commissars	Maksim Saburov	6 March 1953	27 April 1954
Deputy chairman of the Council of Peoples' Commissars	Vjatsheslav Malyshev	6 March 1953	27 April 1954
Deputy chairman of the Council of Peoples' Commissars	Ivan Tervosyan	6 March 1953	27 April 1954
Minister of Agriculture	Aleksei Kozlov	6 March 1953	26 September 1953
Minister of Agriculture	Ivan Benediktov	26 September 1953	27 April 1954
Minister of Automotive Industry	Ivan Likhatshev	16 September 1953	27 April 1954
Minister of Aviation Industry	Pyotr Dementev	24 August 1953	27 April 1954
Minister of Chemical Industry	Sergei Tikhomirov	6 March 1953	27 April 1954
Minister of Chemical Industry	Sergei Tikhomirov	6 March 1953	27 April 1954
Minister of Coal Industry	Alexander Zasyadko	6 March 1953	27 April 1954
Minister of Commerce	Anastas Mikoyan	6 March 1953	3 March 1954
Minister of Commerce	Vasili Zavoronkov	3 March 1954	21 April 1954
Minister of Communications	Nikolai Psurtshev	6 March 1953	27 April 1954
Minister of Construction	Nikolai Dygai	6 March 1953	27 April 1954
Minister of Culture	Panteleimon Ponomarenko	15 March 1953	9 March 1954
Minister of Culture	Georgy Aleksandrov	9 March 1954	27 April 1954
Minister of Defence	Nikolai Bulganin	6 March 1953	27 April 1954
Minister of Ferrous Metallurgy	Anatoli Kuzmin	8 February 1954	27 April 1954
Minister of Finance	Arseny Zverev	6 March 1953	27 April 1954
Minister of Fish Industry	Aleksandr Ishkov	6 April 1954	27 April 1954
Minister of Food Industry	Vasili Zotov	24 August 1953	21 April 1954
Minister of Foreign Affairs	Vyacheslav Molotov	6 March 1953	27 April 1954
Minister of Geology	Pyotr Antropov	31 August 1953	27 April 1954
Minister of Foreign Trade	Ivan Kabanov	15 September 1953	27 April 1954
Minister of Health	Andrei Tretiakov	6 March 1953	3 March 1954
Minister of Health	Maria Kovrigina	6 March 1953	27 April 1954
Minister of Heavy Machine Building	Vjatsheslav Malyshev	6 March 1953	13 July 1953
Minister of Heavy Machine Building	Ivan Nosenko	13 July 1953	27 April 1954
Minister of Education	Vjatsheslav Yeljutin	9 March 1953	27 April 1954
Minister of the Interior	Lavrentiy Beria	13 March 1953	26 July 1953
Minister of the Interior	Sergei Kruglov	26 July 1953	27 April 1954
Minister of Justice	Konstantin Gorshenin	6 March 1953	27 April 1954
Minister of Machine Building	Maksim Saburov	6 March 1953	29 June 1953
Minister of Machine Building	Stepan Akopov	29 June 1953	21 April 1954
Minister of Medium Machine Building	Vjatsheslav Malyshev	17 July 1953	27 April 1954
Minister of Non-Ferrous Metallurgy	Pjotr Lomako	8 February 1954	27 April 1954
Minister of Oil Industry	Nikolai Baibakov	6 March 1953	27 April 1954
Minister of Power Plants & Electrical Industry	Mikhail Pervukhin	15 March 1953	17 April 1954
Minister of Power Plants & Electrical Industry	Aleksei Pavlenko	17 April 1954	27 April 1954
Minister of Railways	Boris Beshchev	6 March 1953	27 April 1954
Minister of Radio Industry	Valeri Kalmykov	21 January 1954	27 April 1954
Minister of State Farms	Aleksei Kozlov	15 March 1953	21 April 1954
Minister of Transport	Vjatsheslav Malyshev	6 March 1953	13 July 1953
Minister of Transport	Ivan Nosenko	13 July 1953	27 April 1954

== Committees ==
Committee	Chairman	Took office	Left office
Chairman of the State Control Commission	Vsevolod Merkulov	6 March 1953	27 April 1954
Chairman of the State Planning Commission	Grigori Kosyachenko	6 March 1953	29 June 1953
Chairman of the State Planning Commission	Maksim Saburov	29 June 1953	27 April 1954
Chair of State Committee for State Security (KGB)	Ivan Serov	13 March 1954	27 April 1954

Government offices
Preceded by Stalin III	Governments of the Soviet Union; 6 March 1953 – 27 April 1954	Succeeded by Malenkov II
