= Malenkov's second government =

Government of the Soviet Union

- 15th government of the Soviet Union

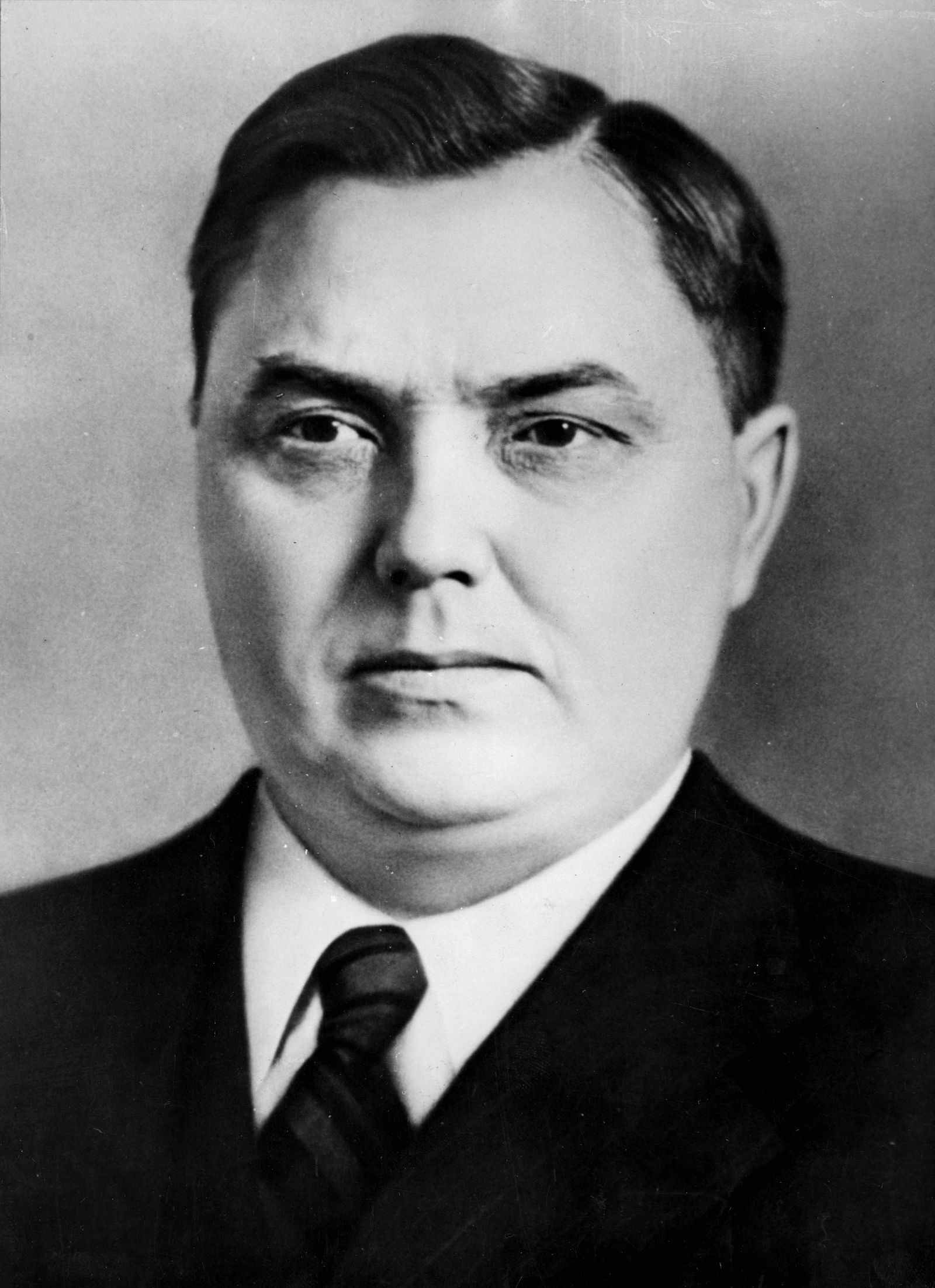
- Date formed: 27 April 1954
- Date dissolved: 8 February 1955

People and organisations
- Head of state: Kliment Voroshilov
- Head of government: Georgy Malenkov
- Deputy head of government: Vyacheslav Molotov
- No. of ministers: 60
- Member party: CPSU
- Status in legislature: One Party State

History
- Election: 1954 Soviet Union legislative election
- Predecessor: Malenkov I
- Successor: Bulganin

Malenkov's second government was created on 27 April 1954 and was dissolved on 8 February 1955, with the creation of Bulganin's government.

== Ministries ==
The government consisted of:

Ministry	Minister	Took office	Left office
Chairman of the Council of Peoples' Commissars	Georgy Malenkov	27 April 1954	8 February 1955
First Deputy chairman of the Council of Peoples' Commissars	Vyacheslav Molotov	27 April 1954	8 February 1955
First Deputy chairman of the Council of Peoples' Commissars	Nikolai Bulganin	27 April 1954	8 February 1955
First Deputy chairman of the Council of Peoples' Commissars	Lazar Kaganovich	27 April 1954	8 February 1955
Deputy chairman of the Council of Peoples' Commissars	Anastas Mikoyan	27 April 1954	8 February 1955
Deputy chairman of the Council of Peoples' Commissars	Maksim Saburov	27 April 1954	8 February 1955
Deputy chairman of the Council of Peoples' Commissars	Mikhail Pervukhin	27 April 1954	8 February 1955
Deputy chairman of the Council of Peoples' Commissars	Ivan Tervosyan	27 April 1954	8 February 1955
Deputy chairman of the Council of Peoples' Commissars	Vjatsheslav Malyshev	27 April 1954	8 February 1955
Deputy chairman of the Council of Peoples' Commissars	Aleksei Kosygin	27 April 1954	8 February 1955
Minister of Agriculture	Ivan Benediktov	27 April 1954	8 February 1955
Minister of Automotive Industry	Stepan Akopov	19 April 1954	8 February 1955
Minister of Aviation Industry	Pyotr Dementev	27 April 1954	8 February 1955
Minister of Chemical Industry	Sergei Tikhomirov	27 April 1954	8 February 1955
Minister of Coal Industry	Alexander Zasyadko	27 April 1954	8 February 1955
Minister of Commerce	Vasili Shavoronkov	27 April 1954	24 August 1954
Minister of Commerce	Dmitri Pavlov	3 February 1955	8 February 1955
Minister of Communications	Nikolai Psurtshev	27 April 1954	8 February 1955
Minister of Construction	Nikolai Dygai	27 April 1954	8 February 1955
Minister of Culture	Georgy Aleksandrov	27 April 1954	8 February 1955
Minister of Defence	Nikolai Bulganin	27 April 1954	8 February 1955
Minister of Ferrous Metallurgy	Anatoli Kuzmin	27 April 1954	29 October 1954
Minister of Ferrous Metallurgy	Aleksandr Sherementjev	15 November 1954	8 February 1955
Minister of Finance	Arseny Zverev	27 April 1954	8 February 1955
Minister of Fish Industry	Aleksandr Ishkov	27 April 1954	8 February 1955
Minister of Food Industry	Vasili Zotov	27 April 1954	8 February 1955
Minister of Foreign Affairs	Vyacheslav Molotov	27 April 1954	8 February 1955
Minister of Foreign Trade	Ivan Kabanov	27 April 1954	8 February 1955
Minister of Geology	Pyotr Antropov	27 April 1954	8 February 1955
Minister of Health	Maria Kovrigina	27 April 1954	8 February 1955
Minister of Heavy Machine Building	Nikolai Kazakov	19 April 1954	8 February 1955
Minister of Education	Vjatsheslav Yeljutin	27 April 1954	8 February 1955
Minister of the Interior	Sergei Kruglov	27 April 1954	8 February 1955
Minister of Justice	Konstantin Gorshenin	27 April 1954	8 February 1955
Minister of Machine Building	Pjotr Parshin	19 April 1954	8 February 1955
Minister of Medium Machine Building	Vjatsheslav Malyshev	27 April 1954	8 February 1955
Minister of Non-Ferrous Metallurgy	Pjotr Lomako	27 April 1954	8 February 1955
Minister of Oil Industry	Nikolai Baibakov	27 April 1954	8 February 1955
Minister of Power Plants	Aleksei Pavlenko	27 April 1954	8 February 1955
Minister of Railways	Boris Beshchev	27 April 1954	8 February 1955
Minister of Radio Industry	Valeri Kalmykov	27 April 1954	8 February 1955
Minister of State Farms	Aleksei Kozlov	27 April 1954	8 February 1955
Minister of Transport Machines Construction	Sergei Stepanov	19 April 1954	8 February 1955

== Committees ==
Committee	Chairman	Took office	Left office
Chairman of the State Control Commission	Vasili Shavoronkov	27 April 1954	8 February 1955
Chairman of the State Planning Commission	Maksim Saburov	27 April 1954	8 February 1955
Chair of State Committee for State Security (KGB)	Ivan Serov	27 April 1954	8 February 1955

Government offices
Preceded by Malenkov I	Governments of the Soviet Union; 27 April 1954 – 8 February 1955	Succeeded by Bulganin
