= Bulganin's government =

Government of the Soviet Union

- 16th Government of the Soviet Union

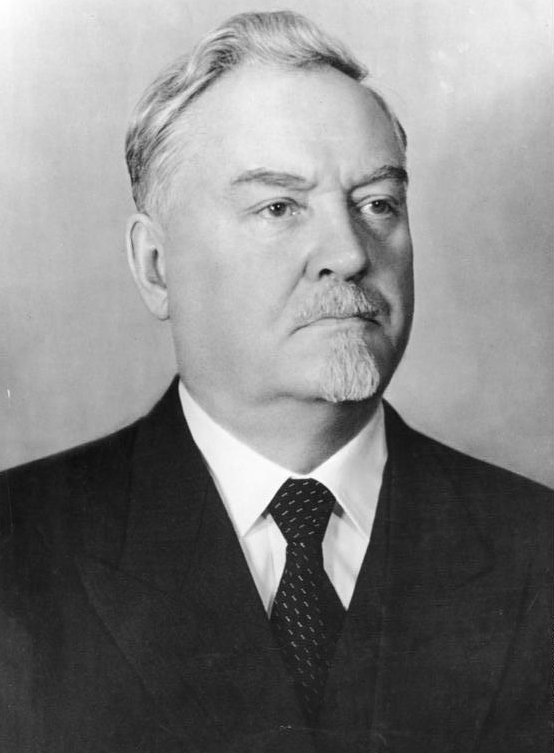
- Date formed: 8 February 1955
- Date dissolved: 27 March 1958

People and organisations
- Head of state: Kliment Voroshilov
- Head of government: Nikolai Bulganin
- Deputy head of government: Vyacheslav Molotov
- No. of ministers: 74

History
- Election: 1954 legislative election
- Predecessor: Malenkov II
- Successor: Khrushchev I

The former government of Georgy Malenkov was dissolved on February 8, 1955, and Bulganin succeeded Malenkov as premier of the Soviet Union that day. He was generally seen as a supporter of Khrushchev's reforms and de-Stalinisation. In July 1955, he attended the Geneva Summit, with U.S. President Dwight D. Eisenhower, French Prime Minister Edgar Faure, and British Prime Minister Anthony Eden. He and Khrushchev travelled together to India, Yugoslavia and in April 1956 to Britain, where they were known in the press as "the B and K show" or "Bulge and Crush". In his memoirs, however, Khrushchev recounted that he believed that he "couldn't rely on [Bulganin] fully."

During the Suez Crisis of October–November 1956, Bulganin sent letters to the governments of the United Kingdom, France, and Israel threatening rocket attacks on London, Paris, and Tel Aviv if they did not withdraw their forces from Egypt. In a letter to Israeli prime minister David Ben-Gurion, Bulganin wrote, "Israel is playing with the fate of peace, with the fate of its own people, in a criminal and irresponsible manner; ... which will place a question [mark] upon the very existence of Israel as a State." Khrushchev, in his memoirs, admitted the threat was designed simply to divide Western opinion, especially since at the time he did not have enough ICBMs to launch the rockets, and in any case he had no intention of going to war in 1956.

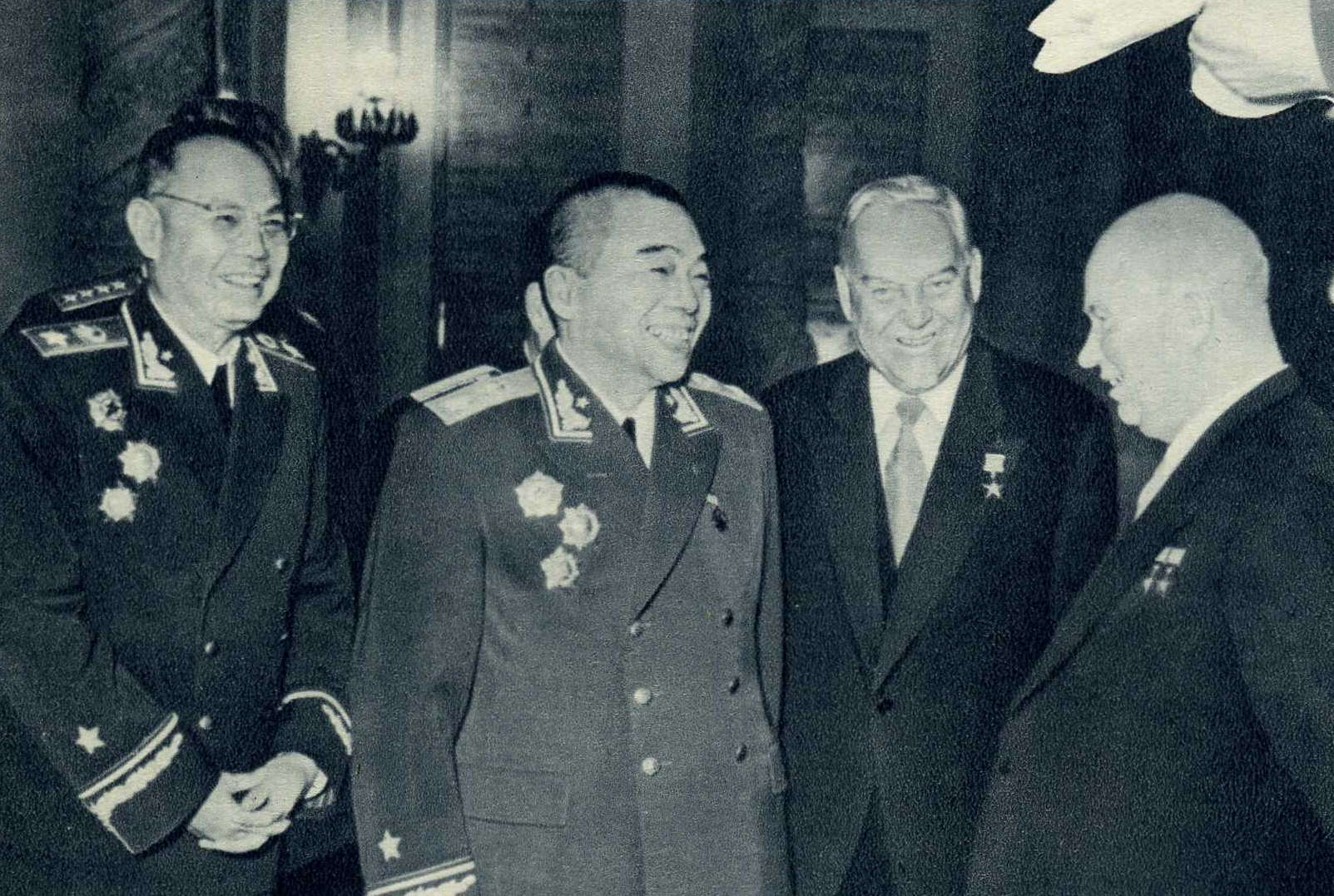
Bulganin with Khrushchev and Chinese Marshals Peng Dehuai and Ye Jianying

But by 1957 Bulganin had come to share the doubts held about Khrushchev's policies by the opposition group (which Khrushchev and his supporters labelled the "Anti-Party Group") led by Vyacheslav Molotov. In June, when the dissenters tried to remove Khrushchev from power at a meeting of the Politburo, Bulganin vacillated between the two camps. When the dissenters were defeated and removed from power, Bulganin held on to his position for a while, but in March 1958, at a session of the Supreme Soviet, Khrushchev forced his resignation. The government of Nikolai Bulganin was dissolved following the Soviet legislative election of 1958. Nikita Khrushchev was elected as the next Premier by the Politburo and the Central Committee following the election.

== Ministries ==
Ministry	Minister	Took office	Left office
Chairman of the Council of Ministers	Nikolai Bulganin	8 February 1955	27 March 1958
First Deputy chairman of the Council of Ministers	Vyacheslav Molotov	8 February 1955	4 July 1957
First Deputy chairman of the Council of Ministers	Lazar Kaganovich	8 February 1955	4 July 1957
First Deputy chairman of the Council of Ministers	Anastas Mikoyan	28 February 1955	27 March 1958
First Deputy chairman of the Council of Ministers	Maksim Saburov	28 February 1955	5 July 1958
First Deputy chairman of the Council of Ministers	Mikhail Pervukhin	28 February 1955	5 July 1958
First Deputy chairman of the Council of Ministers	Joseph Kuzmin	3 May 1957	27 March 1958
Deputy chairman of the Council of Peoples' Commissars	Vjatsheslav Malyshev	8 February 1955	26 December 1956
Deputy chairman of the Council of Peoples' Commissars	Aleksei Kosygin	8 February 1955	26 December 1956
Deputy chairman of the Council of Peoples' Commissars	Aleksei Kosygin	5 July 1957	27 March 1958
Deputy chairman of the Council of Peoples' Commissars	Georgi Malenkov	9 February 1955	4 July 1957
Deputy chairman of the Council of Peoples' Commissars	Ivan Tervosyan	8 February 1955	30 December 1956
Deputy chairman of the Council of Peoples' Commissars	Avraam Zavenyagin	28 February 1955	1 January 1957
Deputy chairman of the Council of Peoples' Commissars	Vladimir Kucherenko	28 February 1955	25 December 1956
Deputy chairman of the Council of Peoples' Commissars	Pavel Lobanov	28 February 1955	9 April 1956
Deputy chairman of the Council of Peoples' Commissars	Mikhail Khrunichev	28 February 1955	25 December 1956
Deputy chairman of the Council of Peoples' Commissars	Vladimir Matskevich	9 April 1956	25 December 1956
Deputy chairman of the Council of Peoples' Commissars	Dmitri Ustinov	14 December 1956	28 March 1957
Minister of Agriculture	Ivan Benediktov	8 February 1955	18 October 1955
Minister of Agriculture	Vladimir Matskevich	19 October 1955	27 March 1958
Minister of Automotive Industry	Stepan Akopov	8 February 1955	23 July 1955
Minister of Automotive Industry	G. Strokin	23 July 1955	10 May 1957
Minister of Aviation Industry	Pjotr Dementev	8 February 1955	14 December 1957
Minister of Chemical Industry	Sergei Tikhomirov	8 February 1955	27 March 1958
Minister of Coal Industry	Alexander Zasyadko	8 February 1955	2 March 1955
Minister of Coal Industry	Aleksandr Zademidko	2 March 1955	10 May 1957
Minister of Commerce	Dmitri Pavlov	8 February 1955	27 March 1958
Minister of Communications	Nikolai Psurtshev	8 February 1955	27 March 1958
Minister of Construction	Nikolai Dygai	8 February 1955	10 May 1957
Minister of Culture	Georgy Aleksandrov	8 February 1955	22 March 1955
Minister of Culture	Nikolai Mikhailov	23 March 1955	27 March 1958
Minister of Defence	Georgy Zhukov	8 February 1955	26 October 1957
Minister of Defence	Rodion Malinovsky	26 October 1957	27 March 1958
Minister of Ferrous Metallurgy	Aleksandr Sherementjev	8 February 1955	10 May 1957
Minister of Finance	Arseni Zverev	8 February 1955	27 March 1958
Minister of Fish Industry	Aleksandr Ishkov	8 February 1955	10 May 1957
Minister of Food Industry	Vasili Zotov	8 February 1955	10 May 1957
Minister of Foreign Affairs	Vyacheslav Molotov	8 February 1955	1 June 1956
Minister of Foreign Affairs	Dmitri Shepilov	1 June 1956	15 February 1957
Minister of Foreign Affairs	Andrei Gromyko	15 February 1957	27 March 1958
Minister of Foreign Trade	Ivan Kabanov	8 February 1955	27 March 1958
Minister of Geology	Pyotr Antropov	8 February 1955	27 March 1958
Minister of Health	Maria Kovrigina	8 February 1955	27 March 1958
Minister of Heavy Machine Building	Nikolai Kazakov	8 February 1955	18 July 1955
Minister of Heavy Machine Building	Konstantin Petukhov	18 July 1955	10 May 1957
Minister of Education	Vjatsheslav Yeljutin	8 February 1955	27 March 1958
Minister of the Interior	Sergei Kruglov	8 February 1955	1 February 1956
Minister of the Interior	Nikolai Dudorov	1 February 1956	27 March 1958
Minister of Justice	Konstantin Gorshenin	8 February 1955	31 May 1956
Minister of Machine Building	Pyotr Parshin	8 February 1955	21 January 1956
Minister of Machine Building	Nikolai Smelyakov	21 January 1956	10 May 1957
Minister of Medium Machine Building	Vjatsheslav Malyshev	8 February 1955	28 February 1955
Minister of Medium Machine Building	Avraam Zavenyagin	28 February 1955	21 January 1956
Minister of Medium Machine Building	Nikolai Smelyakov	21 January 1956	10 May 1957
Minister of Medium Machine Building	Mikhail Pervukhin	10 May 1957	24 July 1957
Minister of Medium Machine Building	Yefim Slavski	24 July 1957	27 March 1958
Minister of Non-Ferrous Metallurgy	Pjotr Lomako	8 February 1955	10 May 1957
Minister of Oil Industry	Nikolai Baibakov	8 February 1955	25 May 1955
Minister of Oil Industry	Mikhail Yevseenko	25 May 1955	10 May 1957
Minister of Electric Power Stations	Georgi Malenkov	9 February 1955	4 July 1957
Minister of Electric Power Stations	Aleksei Pavlenko	4 July 1957	27 March 1958
Minister of Railways	Boris Beshchev	8 February 1955	27 March 1958
Minister of Radio Industry	Valeri Kalmykov	8 February 1955	11 December 1957
Minister of State Farms	Aleksei Kozlov	8 February 1955	2 March 1955
Minister of State Farms	Ivan Benediktov	2 March 1955	30 May 1957
Minister of Transport Machines Construction	Sergei Stepanov	8 February 1955	10 May 1957

== Committees ==
Committee	Chairman	Took office	Left office
Chairman of State Commission f.Perspektive Planning	Nikolai Baybakov	25 May 1955	3 May 1957
Chairman of State Commission f.Perspektive Planning	Josif Kusmin	3 May 1957	10 May 1957
Chairman of the State Planning Commission	Maksim Saburov	8 February 1955	25 December 1956
Chairman of the State Planning Commission	Mikhail Pervukhin	25 December 1956	30 April 1957
Chair of State Committee for State Security (KGB)	Ivan Serov	8 February 1955	27 March 1958

Copied content from Nikolai Bulganin; see that page's history for attribution

Government offices
Preceded by Malenkov II	Governments of the Soviet Union; 8 February 1955 – 27 March 1958	Succeeded by Khrushchev I
