= Stalin's third government =

Soviet government

- 13th government of the Soviet Union

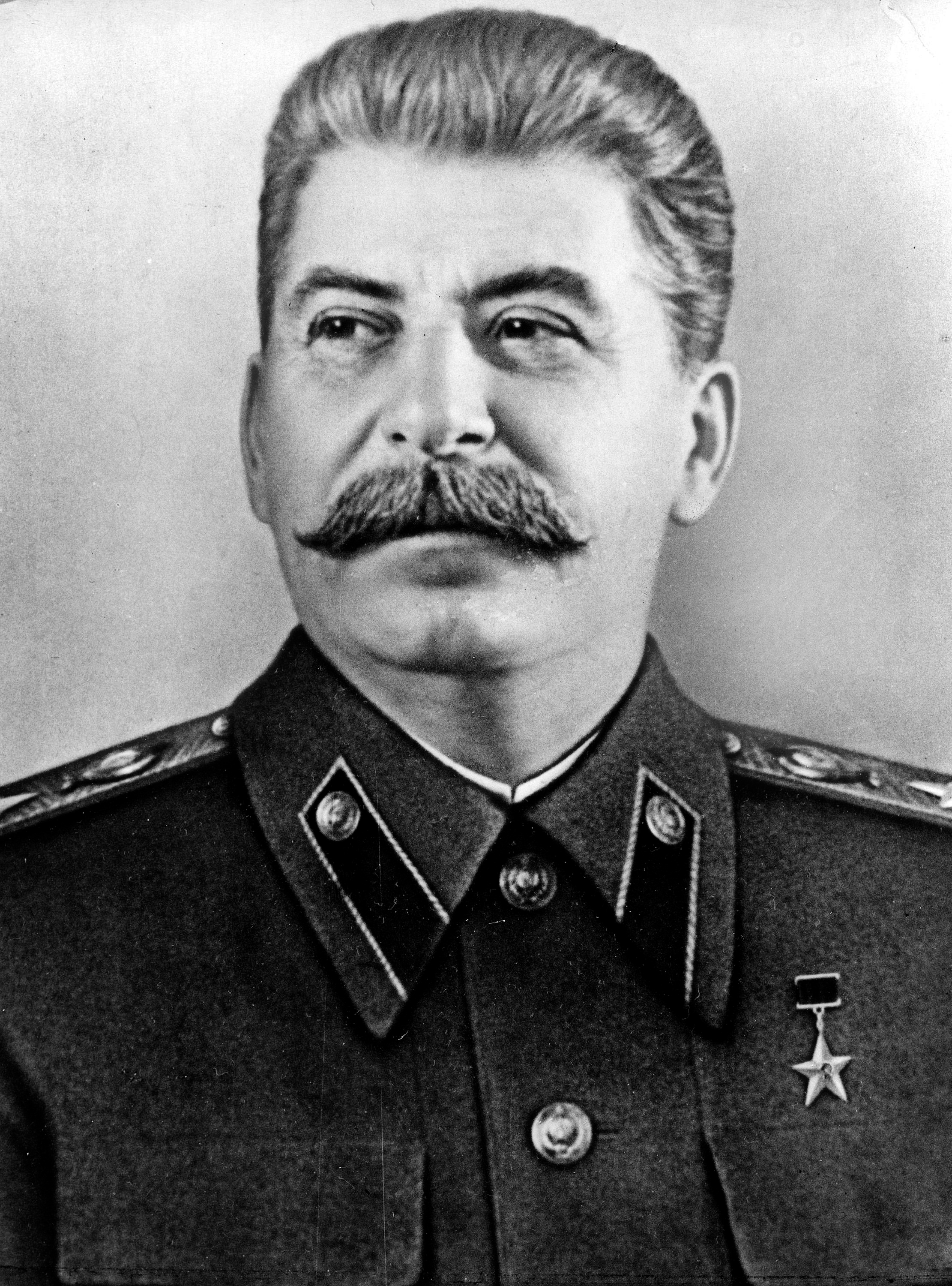
- Date formed: March 12, 1950
- Date dissolved: March 15, 1953

People and organisations
- Head of state: Nikolai Shvernik
- Head of government: President of the Sovmin
- Deputy head of government: Vyacheslav Molotov
- No. of ministers: 56
- Member party: All-Union Communist Party (Bolshevik)
- Status in legislature: Third Convocation of the Supreme Soviet of the Soviet Union

History
- Election: 1950 Soviet Union legislative election
- Outgoing election: 1954 Soviet Union legislative election
- Predecessor: Stalin II
- Successor: Malenkov I

The Third Government of Stalin was the cabinet of the Soviet Union established in 1950 with Joseph Stalin as head of government, serving as president of the Council of Ministers. It functioned until March 15, 1953, with the death of Stalin, when Georgy Malenkov succeeded him as president of the Council of Ministers.

== Ministries ==
Ministry	Minister	Party
Chairman of the Council of Ministers	Joseph Stalin	PCU (b)
First Deputy Chairman of the Council of Ministers	Vyacheslav Molotov	PCU (b)
First Deputy Chairman of the Council of Ministers	Nikolai Bulganin	PCU (b)
Deputy Chairmen of the Council of Ministers	Lavrenti Beria	PCU (b)
Deputy Chairmen of the Council of Ministers	Andrei Andreyev	PCU (b)
Deputy Chairmen of the Council of Ministers	Nikolai Bulganin (1950)	PCU (b)
Deputy Chairmen of the Council of Ministers	Kliment Voroshilov	PCU (b)
Deputy Chairmen of the Council of Ministers	Aleksandr Yefremov (1950-1951)	PCU (b)
Deputy Chairmen of the Council of Ministers	Alexei Kosygin	PCU (b)
Deputy Chairmen of the Council of Ministers	Georgy Malenkov	PCU (b)
Deputy Chairmen of the Council of Ministers	Anastas Mikoyan	PCU (b)
Deputy Chairmen of the Council of Ministers	Maksim Saburov	PCU (b)
Deputy Chairmen of the Council of Ministers	Ivan Tevosian	PCU (b)
Deputy Chairmen of the Council of Ministers	Mikhail Pervukhin	PCU (b)
Deputy Chairmen of the Council of Ministers	Panteleimon Ponomarenko (1952–1953)	PCU (b)
Administrator of Affairs	Mikhail Pomaznev	PCU (b)
Minister of Foreign Affairs	Andrey Vyshinsky	PCU (b)
Minister of Armed Forces	Aleksandr Vasilievsky	PCU (b)
Minister of Navy	Ivan Yumashev (1950–1951)	PCU (b)
Minister of Navy	Nikolai Kuznetsov (1951–1953)	PCU (b)
Minister of Defense	Nikolai Bulganin	PCU (b)
Minister of Foreign Trade	Mikhail Menshikov (1950–1951)	PCU (b)
Minister of Foreign Trade	Pavel Kumykin (1951–1953)	PCU (b)
Minister of Trade	Basilio Zhavoronkov	PCU (b)
Minister of Railways	Boris Beshev	PCU (b)
Minister of Information	Nikolay Psurtsev	PCU (b)
Minister of Timber Industry	Georgy Orlov (1950–1951)	PCU (b)
Minister of Timber Industry	Ivan Emelianovich (1951–1953)	PCU (b)
Minister of Light Industry	Alexei Kosygin	PCU (b)
Minister of Meat and Dairy Industry	Ivan Kuzminy	PCU (b)
Minister of Broad Consumer Goods	Alexei Kosygin	PCU (b)
Minister of Aeronautical Industry	Mikhail Krunichev	PCU (b)
Minister of Automotive Industry	Ivan Jlamov	PCU (b)
Minister of Naval Industry	Vyacheslav Malyshev (1950–1952)	PCU (b)
Minister of Naval Industry	Ivan Nosenko (1952–1953)	PCU (b)
Minister of Armaments	Dmitry Ustinov	PCU (b)
Minister of Agricultural Electrical Engineering	Piotr Goremykin (1950–1951)	PCU (b)
Minister of Agricultural Electrical Engineering	Georgy Popov (1951)	PCU (b)
Minister of Agricultural Electrical Engineering	Sergei Stepanov (1951–1953)	PCU (b)
Minister of Heavy Construction Industry	Nikolai Kazakov	PCU (b)
Minister of Automotive and Tractor Industry	Stepan Akopov (1950)	PCU (b)
Minister of Automotive and Tractor Industry	Grigory Xlamov (1950–1953)	PCU (b)
Minister of Mechanics and Tools	Pyotr Parshin	PCU (b)
Minister of Metallurgical Industry	Ivan Tevosian	PCU (b)
Minister of Ferrous Metallurgy	Ivan Tevosian	PCU (b)
Minister of Non-Ferrous Metallurgy	Pyotr Lomako	PCU (b)
Minister of Petroleum Industry	Nikolai Baibakov	PCU (b)
Minister of Coal Industry	Alexander Zasyadko	PCU (b)
Minister of Electrical Industry	Ivan Kabanov (1950–1951)	PCU (b)
Minister of Electrical Industry	Dmitry Yefremov (1951–1953)	PCU (b)
Minister of Energy	Dmitri Zhimerin	PCU (b)
Minister of Chemical Industry	Sergei Tikhomirov	PCU (b)
Minister of Building Materials Industry	Simon Ginzburg (1950)	PCU (b)
Minister of Building Materials Industry	Pavel Yudin (1950–1953)	PCU (b)
Minister of Transport Engineering	Yuri Maksarev	PCU (b)
Minister of Construction and Mechanical Engineering	Semyon Fomin	PCU (b)
Minister of Finance	Arseny Zverev	PCU (b)
Minister of Rural Affairs	Ivan Benediktov	PCU (b)
Minister of State Farms	Nikolay Skvortsov	PCU (b)
Minister of Cotton	Usman Yusupov	PCU (b)
Minister of Maritime Transport	Nikolai Novikov	PCU (b)
Minister of River Transport	Zosima Shashkov	PCU (b)
Minister of Internal Affairs	Sergey Kruglov	PCU (b)
Minister of Health	Yefim Smirnov (1950–1952)	PCU (b)
Minister of Health	Aleksandr Shabanov (1952–1953)	PCU (b)
Minister of Health	Andrei Treitakov (1953)	PCU (b)
Minister of Justice	Konstantin Gorshenin	PCU (b)
Minister of Food Industry	Boris Dvinsky (1950)	PCU (b)
Minister of Food Industry	Panteleimon Ponomarenko (1951–1952)	PCU (b)
Minister of Food Industry	Nikolai Ignatov (1952–1953)	PCU (b)
Minister of Fishing Industry	Konstantín Rusakov (1950–1952)	PCU (b)
Minister of Fishing Industry	Dmitri Pavlov (1952–1953)	PCU (b)
Minister of Meat and Dairy Industry	Ivan Kuzminy	PCU (b)
Minister of State Security	Viktor Abakumov (1950–1951)	PCU (b)
Minister of State Security	Semyon Ignatiev (1951–1953)	PCU (b)
Minister of Construction Engineering	Nikolai Dygai	PCU (b)
Minister of State Control	Lev Mejlis (1950)	PCU (b)
Minister of State Control	Viktor Abakumov (1950–1953)	PCU (b)
Minister of Higher Education	Sergei Kaftanov (1950–1951)	PCU (b)
Minister of Higher Education	Vsevolod Stoletov (1951–1953)	PCU (b)
State Committee on Cinematography	Ivan Bolshakov	PCU (b)
Minister of Labor and Employment	Vasily Pronin	PCU (b)
Minister of Communications	Alekseenko Gennady	PCU (b)
Minister of Road Transport	Aleksandr Kurshev	PCU (b)
Minister of Railways	Boris Beshev	PCU (b)
Minister of Geology	Piotr Zajarov	PCU (b)
Minister of Urban Development	Georgy Popov	PCU (b)
Minister of Gosbank	Vasily Popov	PCU (b)
Minister of State Planning Committee	Maksim Saburov	PCU (b)

Government offices
Preceded by Stalin II	Governments of the Soviet Union; March 12, 1950 – March 15, 1953	Succeeded by Malenkov I
