= 19th Congress of the Communist Party of the Soviet Union =

1952 meeting of Soviet delegates

The Nineteenth Congress of the Communist Party of the Soviet Union was held from 5 to 14 October 1952. The Congress, which had been repeatedly announced and postponed, was the first party congress after World War II and the last under Joseph Stalin's leadership. It was attended by many dignitaries from foreign Communist parties, including Liu Shaoqi from China. At this Congress, Stalin gave the last public speech of his life. The 19th Central Committee was elected at the congress.

According to Sovietologist Philip E. Mosely, the 19th congress was a pure formality, as the party had been subsumed by the state apparatus in the Soviet Union during Stalin's reign.

== Changes ==
- The All-Union Communist Party (Bolsheviks) was renamed the Communist Party of the Soviet Union.
- Stalin's request to be relieved of his duties in the party secretariat due to his age was rejected by the plenum of the Central Committee held immediately after the congress, as members were unsure about Stalin's intentions.
- The Politburo of the Central Committee became the Presidium of the Central Committee and was greatly expanded to 15 members. The Secretariat and Central Committee were doubled in size (to ten and 133 members, respectively). The Orgburo was abolished, and its duties were transferred to the Secretariat.
- Full members (voting) elected to the 19th Presidium:
  Vasily Andrianov; Averky Aristov; Lavrentiy Beria; Nikolai Bulganin; Kliment Voroshilov; Semyon Ignatyev; Lazar Kaganovich; Demyan Korotchenko; Vasily Kuznetsov; Otto Kuusinen; Georgy Malenkov; Vyacheslav Malyshev; Leonid G. Melnikov; Anastas Mikoyan; Nikolai Mikhaylov; Vyacheslav Molotov; Mikhail Pervukhin; Panteleimon Ponomarenko; Maksim Saburov; Joseph Stalin; Mikhail Suslov; Nikita Khrushchev; Dmitry Chesnokov; Nikolay Shvernik; Matvei Shkiryatov
- Candidate (non-voting) members elected to the Presidium:
  Leonid Brezhnev; Andrei Vyshinsky; Arseni Zverev; Nikolai Ignatov; Ivan Kabanov; Alexei Kosygin; Nikolai Patolichev; Nikolai Pegov; Alexander Puzanov; Ivan Tevosian; Pavel Yudin

An unofficial "inner circle" of Stalin's closest associates included Lavrentiy Beria, Nikolai Bulganin, Kliment Voroshilov, Lazar Kaganovich, Georgy Malenkov, Mikhail Pervukhin, Maksim Saburov, and Nikita Khrushchev.

== See also ==
- 6th Congress of the League of Communists of Yugoslavia, held from 2 to 7 November 1952.
