= Ministry of Machine Tool and Tool Building Industry =

The Ministry of Machine Tool Building (Minstankoprom; Russian: Министерство станкостроения СССР) was a government ministry in the Soviet Union.

The People's Commissariat of Machine Tool Building, later the Ministry of Machine-Tool Building, developed from the People's Commissariat of Heavy Machine Building.

The statute of the People's Commissariat of Heavy Machine Building was confirmed on 23 April 1939. Among the main administrations organized under it was the Main Administration of Machine Tool Building Industry, which developed into a people's commissariat in 1941.

== List of ministers ==
- Aleksandr Yefremov (5.6.1941 - 8.3.1949)
- Anatoli Kostousov (8.3.1949 - 10.5.1957; 2.10.1965 - 1.12.1980)
- Ivan Silayev (1.12.1980 - 21.2.1981)
- Boris Balmont (21.2.1981 - 14.7.1986)
- Nikolai Panichev (14.7.1986 - 24.8.1991)
