= List of governments of the Soviet Union =

The Government of the Soviet Union (Russian: Правительство СССР, Pravitel'stvo SSSR), formally the All-Union Government of the Union of Soviet Socialist Republics, commonly abbreviated to Soviet Government, was the main executive institution of government in the former Soviet Union. It was led by a chairman, but the office was commonly referred to as Premier of the Soviet Union. The premier was nominated by the Central Committee of the Communist Party of the Soviet Union (CPSU) at the 1st Plenary Session of the Supreme Soviet of the Soviet Union in the aftermath of national elections. Certain governments, such as Ryzhkov's II, had more than 100 other government members, serving as first deputy premiers, deputy premiers, government ministers or heads of state committees/commissions; they were chosen by the premier and confirmed by the Supreme Soviet. The Government of the Soviet Union exercised its executive powers in conformity with the constitution of the Soviet Union and legislation enacted by the Supreme Soviet. The first government was led by Vladimir Lenin, and the last government was led by Ivan Silayev.

Following the Treaty on the Creation of the USSR of 1922, the Russian Soviet Socialist Federative Republic, Ukrainian Socialist Soviet Republic, the Byelorussian Socialist Soviet Republic and the Transcaucasian Socialist Federative Soviet Republic established the Union of Soviet Socialist Republics (USSR). The treaty established the government, which was later legitimised by the adoption of the first Soviet constitution in 1924. The 1924 constitution made the government responsible to the Congress of Soviets of the Soviet Union. In 1936, the state system was reformed with the enactment of a new constitution. It abolished the Congress of Soviets and established the Supreme Soviet of the Soviet Union in its place. At the 1st Plenary Session of the II Supreme Soviet in 1946 the government was renamed Council of Ministers. Minor changes were introduced with the enactment of the 1977 constitution. The CPSU's 19th All-Union Conference voted in favor of amending the constitution. It allowed for multi-candidate elections, established the Congress of People's Deputies and weakened the party's control over the Supreme Soviet. Later on 20 March 1991 the Supreme Soviet on Mikhail Gorbachev's suggestion amended the constitution to establish a presidential system. The Council of Ministers was abolished and replaced by a Cabinet of Ministers that was responsible to the President of the Soviet Union. The head of the Cabinet of Ministers was the Prime Minister of the Soviet Union. The government was forced to resign in the aftermath of the 1991 Soviet coup d'état attempt, in which Prime Minister Valentin Pavlov participated in. In its place the Soviet state established what was supposed to be a transitory committee headed by Silayev to run the basic governmental functions until a new cabinet was appointed. On 26 December 1991 the Supreme Soviet dissolved the Soviet Union and therefore, the government of the Soviet Union.

== Governments ==
| Government | Premier | First Deputy Premier(s) | Took office | Left office | Legislature |
|---|---|---|---|---|---|
| Lenin I | Vladimir Lenin | None | 6 July 1923 | 21 January 1924 | Congress of Soviets I |
| Rykov I | Alexei Rykov | None | 23 January 1924 | 2 February 1924 | Congress of Soviets I |
| Rykov II | Alexei Rykov | None | 2 February 1924 | 20 May 1925 | Congress of Soviets II |
| Rykov III | Alexei Rykov | None | 13 May 1925 | 18 April 1927 | Congress of Soviets III |
| Rykov IV | Alexei Rykov | None | 18 April 1927 | 20 May 1929 | Congress of Soviets IV |
| Rykov V | Alexei Rykov | None | 20 May 1929 | 19 December 1930 | Congress of Soviets V |
| Molotov I | Vyacheslav Molotov | None | 19 December 1930 | 8 March 1931 | Congress of Soviets V |
| Molotov II | Vyacheslav Molotov | Valerian Kuybyshev | 8 March 1931 | 28 January 1935 | Congress of Soviets VI |
| Molotov III | Vyacheslav Molotov | None | 28 January 1935 | 5 December 1936 | Congress of Soviets VII |
| Molotov III | Vyacheslav Molotov | None | 5 December 1936 | 12 December 1938 | Supreme Soviet I |
| Molotov IV | Vyacheslav Molotov | Nikolai Voznesensky | 12 December 1937 | 6 May 1941 | Supreme Soviet I |
| Stalin I | Joseph Stalin | Vyacheslav Molotov | 6 May 1941 | 10 February 1946 | Supreme Soviet I |
| Stalin I | Joseph Stalin | Nikolai Voznesensky | 6 May 1941 | 10 February 1946 | Supreme Soviet I |
| Stalin II | Joseph Stalin | Vyacheslav Molotov | 10 February 1946 | 12 March 1950 | Supreme Soviet II |
| Stalin III | Joseph Stalin | Vyacheslav Molotov | 12 March 1950 | 5 March 1953 | Supreme Soviet III |
| Stalin III | Joseph Stalin | Nikolai Bulganin | 12 March 1950 | 5 March 1953 | Supreme Soviet III |
| Malenkov I | Georgy Malenkov | Vyacheslav Molotov | 6 March 1953 | 14 March 1954 | Supreme Soviet III |
| Malenkov I | Georgy Malenkov | Nikolai Bulganin | 6 March 1953 | 14 March 1954 | Supreme Soviet III |
| Malenkov I | Georgy Malenkov | Lavrentiy Beria | 6 March 1953 | 14 March 1954 | Supreme Soviet III |
| Malenkov I | Georgy Malenkov | Lazar Kaganovich | 6 March 1953 | 14 March 1954 | Supreme Soviet III |
| Malenkov II | Georgy Malenkov | Vyacheslav Molotov | 14 March 1954 | 8 February 1955 | Supreme Soviet IV |
| Malenkov II | Georgy Malenkov | Nikolai Bulganin | 14 March 1954 | 8 February 1955 | Supreme Soviet IV |
| Malenkov II | Georgy Malenkov | Lazar Kaganovich | 14 March 1954 | 8 February 1955 | Supreme Soviet IV |
| Bulganin | Nikolai Bulganin | Vyacheslav Molotov | 8 February 1955 | 27 March 1958 | Supreme Soviet IV |
| Bulganin | Nikolai Bulganin | Lazar Kaganovich | 8 February 1955 | 27 March 1958 | Supreme Soviet IV |
| Bulganin | Nikolai Bulganin | Anastas Mikoyan | 8 February 1955 | 27 March 1958 | Supreme Soviet IV |
| Bulganin | Nikolai Bulganin | Mikhail Pervukhin | 8 February 1955 | 27 March 1958 | Supreme Soviet IV |
| Bulganin | Nikolai Bulganin | Maksim Saburov | 8 February 1955 | 27 March 1958 | Supreme Soviet IV |
| Bulganin | Nikolai Bulganin | Joseph Kuzmin | 8 February 1955 | 27 March 1958 | Supreme Soviet IV |
| Khrushchev I | Nikita Khrushchev | Anastas Mikoyan | 27 March 1958 | 18 March 1962 | Supreme Soviet V |
| Khrushchev I | Nikita Khrushchev | Frol Kozlov | 27 March 1958 | 18 March 1962 | Supreme Soviet V |
| Khrushchev I | Nikita Khrushchev | Alexei Kosygin | 27 March 1958 | 18 March 1962 | Supreme Soviet V |
| Khrushchev II | Nikita Khrushchev | Anastas Mikoyan | 18 March 1962 | 14 October 1964 | Supreme Soviet VI |
| Khrushchev II | Nikita Khrushchev | Alexei Kosygin | 18 March 1962 | 14 October 1964 | Supreme Soviet VI |
| Khrushchev II | Nikita Khrushchev | Dmitriy Ustinov | 18 March 1962 | 14 October 1964 | Supreme Soviet VI |
| Kosygin I | Alexei Kosygin | Anastas Mikoyan | 14 October 1964 | 12 June 1966 | Supreme Soviet VI |
| Kosygin I | Alexei Kosygin | Dmitriy Ustinov | 14 October 1964 | 12 June 1966 | Supreme Soviet VI |
| Kosygin I | Alexei Kosygin | Kirill Mazurov | 14 October 1964 | 12 June 1966 | Supreme Soviet VI |
| Kosygin I | Alexei Kosygin | Dmitry Polyansky | 14 October 1964 | 12 June 1966 | Supreme Soviet VI |
| Kosygin II | Alexei Kosygin | Kirill Mazurov | 12 June 1966 | 14 June 1970 | Supreme Soviet VII |
| Kosygin II | Alexei Kosygin | Dmitry Polyansky | 12 June 1966 | 14 June 1970 | Supreme Soviet VII |
| Kosygin III | Alexei Kosygin | Kirill Mazurov | 14 June 1970 | 16 June 1974 | Supreme Soviet VIII |
| Kosygin III | Alexei Kosygin | Dmitry Polyansky | 14 June 1970 | 16 June 1974 | Supreme Soviet VIII |
| Kosygin IV | Alexei Kosygin | Kirill Mazurov | 16 June 1974 | 4 March 1979 | Supreme Soviet IX |
| Kosygin IV | Alexei Kosygin | Nikolai Tikhonov | 16 June 1974 | 4 March 1979 | Supreme Soviet IX |
| Kosygin V | Alexei Kosygin | Nikolai Tikhonov | 4 March 1979 | 23 October 1980 | Supreme Soviet X |
| Tikhonov I | Nikolai Tikhonov | Ivan Arkhipov | 23 October 1980 | 11 April 1984 | Supreme Soviet X |
| Tikhonov I | Nikolai Tikhonov | Heydar Aliyev | 23 October 1980 | 11 April 1984 | Supreme Soviet X |
| Tikhonov I | Nikolai Tikhonov | Andrei Gromyko | 23 October 1980 | 11 April 1984 | Supreme Soviet X |
| Tikhonov II | Nikolai Tikhonov | Ivan Arkhipov | 11 April 1984 | 27 September 1985 | Supreme Soviet XI |
| Tikhonov II | Nikolai Tikhonov | Heydar Aliyev | 11 April 1984 | 27 September 1985 | Supreme Soviet XI |
| Tikhonov II | Nikolai Tikhonov | Andrei Gromyko | 11 April 1984 | 27 September 1985 | Supreme Soviet XI |
| Ryzhkov I | Nikolai Ryzhkov | Ivan Arkhipov | 27 September 1985 | 17 July 1989 | Supreme Soviet XI |
| Ryzhkov I | Nikolai Ryzhkov | Heydar Aliyev | 27 September 1985 | 17 July 1989 | Supreme Soviet XI |
| Ryzhkov I | Nikolai Ryzhkov | Nikolai Talyzin | 27 September 1985 | 17 July 1989 | Supreme Soviet XI |
| Ryzhkov I | Nikolai Ryzhkov | Vsevolod Murakhovsky | 27 September 1985 | 17 July 1989 | Supreme Soviet XI |
| Ryzhkov I | Nikolai Ryzhkov | Yuri Maslyukov | 27 September 1985 | 17 July 1989 | Supreme Soviet XI |
| Ryzhkov II | Nikolai Ryzhkov | Vsevolod Murakhovsky | 17 July 1989 | 14 January 1991 | Supreme Soviet XII-XIII |
| Ryzhkov II | Nikolai Ryzhkov | Yuri Maslyukov | 17 July 1989 | 14 January 1991 | Supreme Soviet XII-XIII |
| Ryzhkov II | Nikolai Ryzhkov | Lev Voronin | 17 July 1989 | 14 January 1991 | Supreme Soviet XII-XIII |
| Ryzhkov II | Nikolai Ryzhkov | Vladilen Nikitin | 17 July 1989 | 14 January 1991 | Supreme Soviet XII-XIII |
| Pavlov | Valentin Pavlov | Vladimir Velichko | 14 January 1991 | 28 August 1991 | Supreme Soviet XII-XIII |
| Pavlov | Valentin Pavlov | Vitaly Doguzhiev | 14 January 1991 | 28 August 1991 | Supreme Soviet XII-XIII |
| Silayev | Ivan Silayev | None | 28 August 1991 | 25 December 1991 | Supreme Soviet XII-XIII |

== Statistics ==
| Government | Length of tenure | No. of first deputies | No. of deputies | No. of ministers | No. of ministries | No. of committees |
|---|---|---|---|---|---|---|
| Lenin I | 199 days | — | 5 | 19 | 12 | 1 |
| Rykov I | 10 days | — | 4 | 18 | 11 | 1 |
| Rykov II | 1 year, 107 days | — | 4 | 20 | 11 | 1 |
| Rykov III | 1 year, 341 days | — | 5 | 24 | 11 | 1 |
| Rykov IV | 2 years, 32 days | — | 4 | 18 | 11 | 1 |
| Rykov V | 1 year, 213 days | — | 4 | 25 | 13 | 1 |
| Molotov I | 79 days | — | 3 | 13 | 11 | 1 |
| Molotov II | 3 years, 326 days | 1 | 5 | 36 | 22 | 1 |
| Molotov III | 3 years, 318 days | — | 4 | | | |
| Molotov IV | 3 years, 145 days | 1 | 10 | | | |
| Stalin I | 4 years, 280 days | 2 | 15 | | | |
| Stalin II | 4 years, 30 days | 1 | 15 | | | |
| Stalin III | 2 years, 358 days | 2 | 14 | | | |
| Malenkov I | 1 year, 8 days | 4 | 9 | | | |
| Malenkov II | 331 days | 3 | 6 | | | |
| Bulganin | 3 years, 47 days | 6 | 9 | | | |
| Khrushchev I | 3 years, 356 days | 3 | 8 | | | |
| Khrushchev II | 2 years, 210 days | 3 | 9 | | | |
| Kosygin I | 1 year, 241 days | 4 | 9 | | | |
| Kosygin II | 4 years, 2 days | 2 | 9 | | | |
| Kosygin III | 4 years, 2 days | 2 | 12 | | | |
| Kosygin IV | 4 years, 263 days | 2 | 13 | | | |
| Kosygin V | 1 year, 233 days | 1 | 13 | | | |
| Tikhonov I | 3 years, 171 days | 3 | 17 | | | |
| Tikhonov II | 1 year, 169 days | 3 | 11 | | | |
| Ryzhkov I | 3 years, 293 days | 5 | 20 | 140 | 71 | 4 |
| Ryzhkov II | 1 year, 181 days | 4 | 17 | 56 | 37 | 2 |
| Pavlov | 226 days | 2 | 3 | 46 | 36 | 1 |
| Silayev | 119 days | — | 5 | 16 | 9 | 1 |

== See also ==
- Bibliography of the Russian Revolution and Civil War § Government
- Bibliography of Stalinism and the Soviet Union § Government
- Bibliography of the Post Stalinist Soviet Union § Government
- Premier of the Soviet Union
