= Tax on trees =

Soviet tax on fruit tree owners

Tax on trees was a tax imposed on the owners of fruit trees in the USSR by Joseph Stalin's government in 1944. The tax made it expensive to have trees on a farm, and had the unintended consequence of causing a mass felling of trees by Soviet farmers. This subsequently led to shortage of fruit.

The idea was proposed by the Minister Arseny Zverev, and Stalin failed to foresee the problems it would produce. The tax was repealed in 1954 by Georgy Malenkov, when taxes were reduced by 60 percent for farmers.

== See also ==
- Agriculture in the Soviet Union
- Four Pests campaign
