= Presidium of the 19th Congress of the Communist Party of the Soviet Union =

19th Presidium
- 18th Politburo ← → 20th Presidium
- Duration: 16 October 1952 – 27 February 1956

The Presidium of the 19th Congress of the Communist Party of the Soviet Union (CPSU) was in session from 1952 to 1956.

== Composition ==
=== Members ===
Members of the Presidium of the 19th Congress of the Communist Party of the Soviet Union
Name	Cyrillic	18th POL	20th PRE	Birth	Death	PM	Ethnicity	Gender
Vasily Andrianov	Василий Андрианов	New	Not	1902	1978	1926	Russian	Male
Averky Aristov	Аверкий Аристов	New	Reelected	1903	1973	1921	Russian	Male
Lavrentiy Beria	Лаврентий Берия	Old	Relieved	1899	1953	1917	Georgian	Male
Nikolai Bulganin	Николай Булганин	Old	Reelected	1895	1975	1917	Russian	Male
Dmitry Chesnokov	Дмитрий Чесноков	New	Not	1910	1973	1939	Russian	Male
Semyon Ignatyev	Семён Игнатьев	New	Not	1904	1983	1924	Ukrainian	Male
Lazar Kaganovich	Лазарь Каганович	Old	Reelected	1893	1991	1911	Ukrainian Jew	Male
Nikita Khrushchev	Никита Хрущёв	Old	Reelected	1894	1971	1918	Russian	Male
Aleksey Kirichenko	Алексе́й Кириче́нко	Promoted	Reelected	1908	1975	1930	Ukrainian	Male
Demyan Korotchenko	Демьян Коротченко	New	Not	1894	1969	1918	Ukrainian	Male
Otto Kuusinen	Отто Куусинен	New	Not	1881	1964	1918	Finn	Male
Vasily Kuznetsov	Василий Кузнецов	New	Not	1901	1990	1927	Russian	Male
Georgy Malenkov	Георги Маленков	Old	Reelected	1902	1988	1920	Russian	Male
Vyacheslav Malyshev	Вячеслав Малышев	New	Not	1902	1957	1926	Russian	Male
Leonid Melnikov	Леонид Мельников	New	Demoted	1906	1981	1928	Ukrainian	Male
Nikolai Mikhailov	Николай Михайлов	New	Not	1906	1982	1930	Russian	Male
Anastas Mikoyan	Анастас Микоян	Old	Reelected	1895	1978	1915	Armenian	Male
Vyacheslav Molotov	Вячеслав Молотов	Old	Reelected	1890	1986	1906	Russian	Male
Mikhail Pervukhin	Михаил Первухин	New	Reelected	1904	1978	1919	Russian	Male
Panteleimon Ponomarenko	Пантелеймон Пономаренко	New	Demoted	1902	1984	1925	Ukrainian	Male
Maksim Saburov	Макси́м Сабу́ров	New	Reelected	1900	1977	1920	Russian	Male
Matvei Shkiryatov	Матвей Шкирятов	New	Died	1883	1954	1906	Russian	Male
Nikolai Shvernik	Никола́й Шве́рник	Candidate	Demoted	1888	1970	1905	Russian	Male
Joseph Stalin	Иосиф Сталин	Old	Died	1878	1953	1898	Georgian	Male
Mikhail Suslov	Михаил Суслов	New	Reelected	1902	1982	1921	Russian	Male
Kliment Voroshilov	Климент Ворошилов	Old	Reelected	1881	1969	1903	Russian	Male

=== Candidates ===
Candidate Members of the Presidium of the 19th Congress of the Communist Party of the Soviet Union
Name	Cyrillic	18th POL	20th PRE	Birth	Death	PM	Ethnicity	Gender
Mir Jafar Baghirov	Мир Джафар Багиров	By-election	Relieved	1896	1956	1917	Azerbaijani	Male
Leonid Brezhnev	Леонид Брежнев	New	Candidate	1906	1982	1931	Russian	Male
Nikolai Ignatov	Никола́й Игна́тов	New	Not	1901	1966	1924	Russian	Male
Ivan Kabanov	Иван Кабанов	New	Not	1897	1972	1917	Russian	Male
Alexei Kosygin	Алексей Косыгин	Member	Not	1904	1980	1927	Russian	Male
Aleksey Kirichenko	Алексе́й Кириче́нко	New	Promoted	1908	1975	1930	Ukrainian	Male
Leonid Melnikov	Леонид Мельников	Demoted	Not	1906	1981	1928	Ukrainian	Male
Nikolai Patolichev	Николай Патоличев	New	Not	1908	1989	1928	Russian	Male
Nikolai Pegov	Николай Пегов	New	Not	1905	1991	1930	Russian	Male
Panteleimon Ponomarenko	Пантелеймон Пономаренко	Demoted	Not	1902	1984	1925	Ukrainian	Male
Alexander Puzanov	Александр Пузанов	New	Not	1906	1998	1925	Russian	Male
Nikolai Shvernik	Никола́й Шве́рник	Demoted	Candidate	1888	1970	1905	Russian	Male
Ivan Tevosian	Иван Тевосян	New	Not	1902	1958	1918	Armenian	Male
Andrey Vyshinsky	Андрей Вышинский	New	Died	1883	1954	1920	Russian	Male
Pavel Yudin	Павел Юдин	New	Not	1899	1968	1918	Russian	Male
Arseny Zverev	Арсений Зверев	New	Not	1900	1969	1919	Russian	Male

== Organs of the 19th Presidium (dissolved in March 1953) ==
Bureau of the Presidium

- Lavrentiy Beria (1889–1953)
- Nikolai Bulganin (1895–1975)
- Kliment Voroshilov (1881–1969)
- Lazar Kaganovich (1893–1991)
- Georgy Malenkov (1902–1988)
- Mikhail Pervukhin (1904–1978)
- Maksim Saburov (1900–1977)
- Joseph Stalin (1878–1953)
- Nikita Khrushchev (1894–1971)

Standing Committee on Ideological Questions

- Aleksey Rumyantsev (1905–1993) — Chairman from 18 November 1952 until 23 March 1953.
- Mikhail Suslov (1902–1982)
- Dmitry Chesnokov (1910–1973)
- Dmitry Shepilov (1905–1995) — Chairman from 10 October 1952 until 18 November 1952.
- Pavel Yudin (1899–1968)

Standing Committee on Defense

- Lavrentiy Beria (1899–1953)
- Nikolai Bulganin (1895–1975) — Chairman from 10 October 1952 until 3 March 1953.
- Aleksandr Vasilevsky (1895–1977)
- Kliment Voroshilov (1883–1969)
- Semyon Zakharov (1906–1986)
- Lazar Kaganovich (1893–1991)
- Nikolay Kuznetsov (1904–1974)
- Vyacheslav Malyshev (1902–1957)
- Mikhail Pervukhin (1904–1978)
- Maksim Saburov (1900–1977)
- Leonid Brezhnev (1906–1982) — was appointed to the body on 19 November 1952.
- Gregory Gromov (1900–1977) — served as the body's Secretary from 10 October 1952 until 3 March 1953.

Standing Committee on Foreign Affairs

- Leonid Brezhnev (1906–1982)
- Andrei Vyshinsky (1883–1954)
- Semyon Ignatiev (1904–1983)
- Lazar Kaganovich (1893–1991)
- Vasily Kuznetsov (1901–1990)
- Pavel Kumykin (1901–1976)
- Otto Wille Kuusinen (1881–1964)
- Georgy Malenkov (1902–1982) — served as the body's Chairman from 10 October 1952 until 3 March 1953.
- Nikolai Mikhailov (1906–1982)
- Vyacheslav Molotov (1890–1986)
- Mikhail Pervukhin (1904–1978)
- Boris Ponomarev (1905–1995)
- Alexander Poskrebyshev (1891–1965)
- Mikhail Suslov (1902–1982)
- Lavrentiy Beria (1899–1953) — elected to the body on 11 December 1952.
