= Aleksandr Yefremov (politician) =

Soviet politician (1904–1951)

- Александр Ефремов

Minister of Heavy Machinery
- In office 17 April 1940 – 5 June 1941
- Premier: Joseph Stalin
- Preceded by: Vyacheslav Malyshev
- Succeeded by: Nikolai Kazakov

Chairman of the Executive Committee of the Moscow City Council
- In office 3 November 1938 – 14 April 1939
- Preceded by: Ivan Sidorov
- Succeeded by: Vasily Pronin

Personal details
- Born: 26 April 1904 Moscow, Russian Empire
- Died: 23 November 1951 (aged 47) Moscow, Russian SFSR, Soviet Union
- Resting place: Kremlin Wall Necropolis, Moscow
- Party: CPSU (1925)
- Education: STANKIN
- Awards: Order of Lenin, Order of Kutuzov, Order of the Red Banner of Labour, Medal "For the Defence of Moscow", Medal "For the Victory over Germany in the Great Patriotic War 1941–1945", Medal "For Valiant Labour in the Great Patriotic War 1941–1945", Medal "In Commemoration of the 800th Anniversary of Moscow"

Aleksandr Illarionovich Yefremov (Russian: Александр Илларионович Ефремов; 23 April 1904 – 23 November 1951) was a Soviet politician who was Chairman of the Executive Committee of the Moscow City Council of Workers', Peasants' and Red Army Deputies (today's equivalent of mayor) from 3 November 1938 to 14 April 1939.

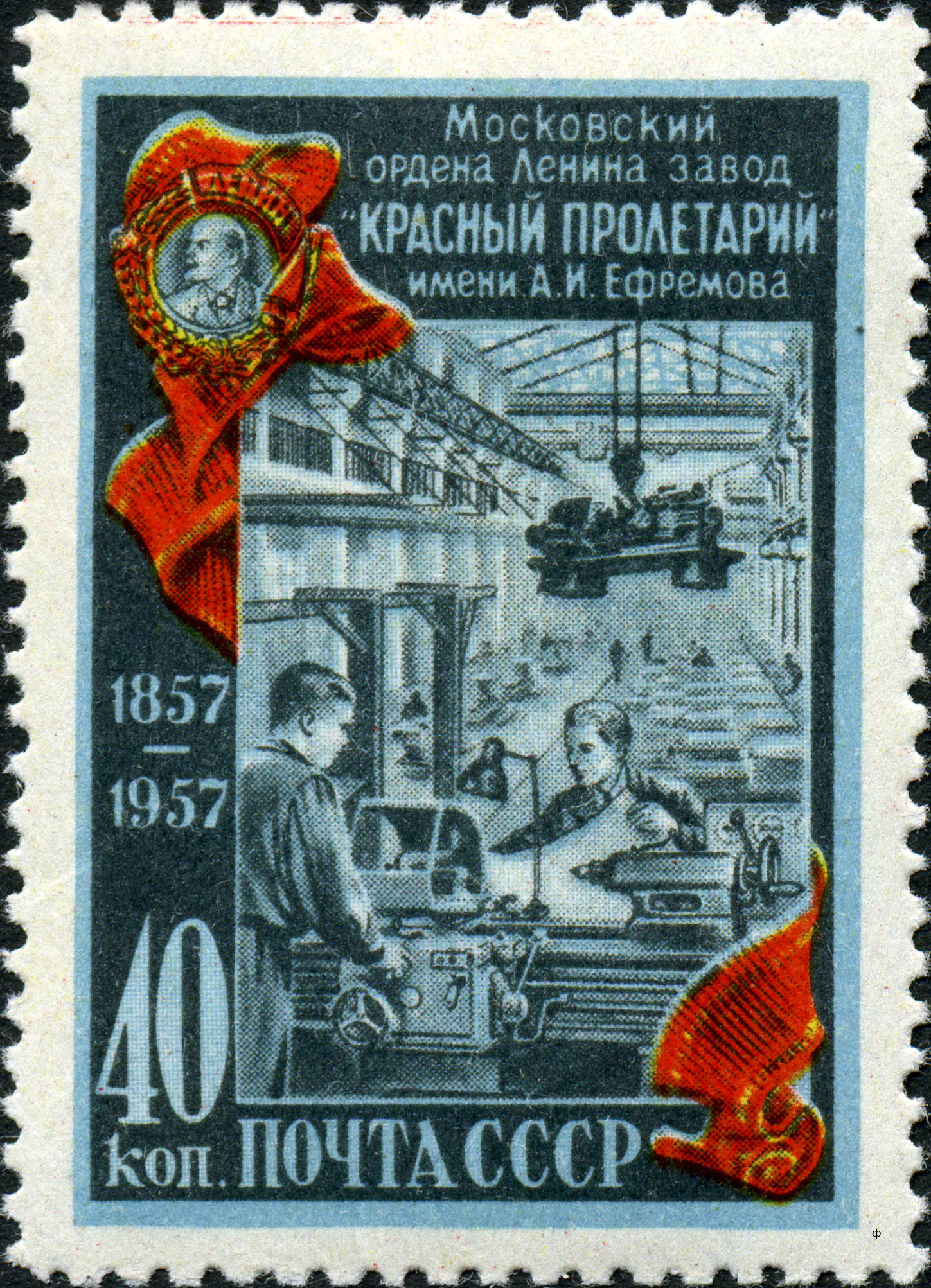
Stamp depicting the "Red Proletariot" toolworks in Moscow; it was renamed in honour of Efremov later.

== Life and career ==
Aleksandr Yefremov was born in Moscow in 1904 into the family of a factory worker. In 1916, he began to work as a mechanic helper, later on becoming a mechanic proper at a railway shop. In 1924, he joined the Russian Communist Party (Bolsheviks).

In 1935, he graduated from the STANKIN and worked as a shop foreman, shop superintendent, and then finally as a director of a machine-tool factory named after Sergo Ordzhonikidze. In 1938–1939, Aleksandr Yefremov held the posts of a deputy chairman of the Moscow City Council and then chairman of the Moscow Oblast Executive Committee and chairman of the Moscow City Council. Yefremov contributed to the construction of the third stage of the Moscow Metro and All-Union Agricultural Exhibition. In 1939, he became a member of the Central Committee of the VKP(b).

From 1939 to 1941, Aleksandr Yefremov held the posts of the first deputy and then Minister of Heavy Machine Building of the Soviet Union. In 1941–1949, he was People's Commissar and then Minister of Machine-Tool Industry. In 1946, Yefremov became a member of the Presidium of the Supreme Soviet of the Russian Soviet Federative Socialist Republic. He was also a Deputy of the Supreme Soviet of the Soviet Union of the 2nd and 3rd convocations and a deputy of the Supreme Soviet of Russia of the 1st and 2nd convocations. From March 8, 1949 to November 23, 1951, Aleksandr Yefremov held the post of the Deputy Chairman of the Council of Ministers of the Soviet Union.

Aleksandr Yefremov died in Moscow in 1951 and was interred in the Kremlin Wall Necropolis. He was awarded the Order of Lenin twice, the Order of Kutuzov (2nd class), the Order of the Red Banner of Labour, and several medals.
