= Ministry of Coal Industry =

Government ministry of the Soviet Union

The Ministry of Coal Industry (Minugleprom; Russian: Министерство угольной промышленности СССР) was a government ministry in the Soviet Union.

Emblem of the Soviet Union

A ukase of the Presidium Supreme Soviet USSR of 28 December 1948 created the all-union Ministry of the Coal Industry USSR by merging the Ministry of the Coal Industry of Western Regions USSR, the Ministry of the Coal Industry of Eastern Regions USSR, and the Ministry for Construction of Fuel Enterprises USSR.

Early Soviet predecessor-organisations included the Main Fuel Administration (Russian: Главное топливное управление («Главтоп»), romanized: Glavnoe toplivoe upravlenie - Glavtop), founded in 1918. The Soviet coal industry formed part of the all-union People's Commissariat of Heavy Industry (established in 1932). A ukase of the Presidium of the Supreme Soviet of the USSR on 24 January 1939 established the all-union People's Commissariat of Fuel Industry, which included the coal, shale and petroleum industries. A ukase of 12 October 1939 subdivided the all-union People's Commissariat of Fuel Industry into the all-union People's Commissariat of the Coal Industry USSR and the all-union People's Commissariat of Petroleum Industry USSR.

The all-union People's Commissariat of the Coal Industry USSR was split by a 19 January 1946 ukase into the all-union People's Commissariat of the Coal Industry of Western Regions USSR and the all-union People's Commissariat of the Coal industry of Eastern Regions USSR. A ukase of 28 January 1946 established the People's Commissariat for Construction of Fuel Enterprises USSR. The three commissariats became ministries on 15 March 1946.

== List of ministers ==
No.	Portrait	Minister of Coal Industry	Took office	Left office	Time in office	Cabinet
1	Vasily Vakhrushev	Vasily Vakhrushev (1902–1947)	12 October 1939	19 January 1940	99 days	Molotov IV
2	Alexander Zasyadko	Alexander Zasyadko (1910–1963)	28 December 1948	2 March 1955	6 years, 64 days	Stalin II–III; Malenkov I–II; Bulganin
3	Alexander N. Zademidko [ru]	Alexander N. Zademidko (1908–2001)	2 March 1955	10 May 1957	2 years, 69 days	Bulganin
4	Boris Bratshenko [ru]	Boris Bratshenko (1912–2004)	2 October 1965	15 December 1985	20 years, 74 days	Kosygin I–II–III–IV–V; Tikhonov I–II; Ryzhkov I
5	Mikhail Shchadov	Mikhail Shchadov (1927–2011)	15 December 1985	24 August 1991	5 years, 252 days	Ryzhkov I–II; Pavlov
