= Ministry of the Automotive Industry =

Government ministry of the Soviet Union

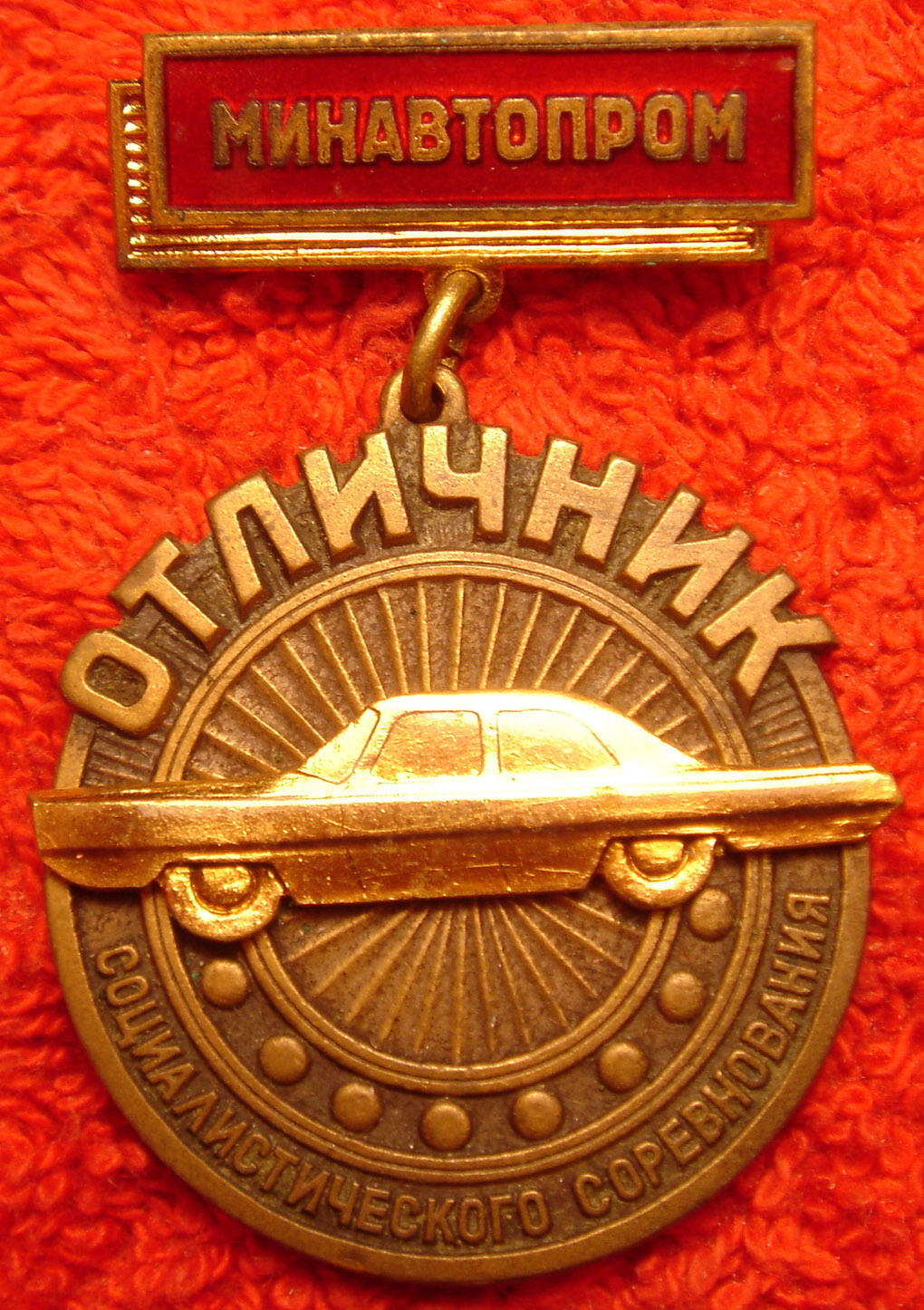
A reward for automobile industry workers issued by MinAutoProm for "Excellence at the workplace".

The Ministry of the Automotive Industry (Minavtoprom; Russian: Министерство автомобильной промышленности СССР) was a government ministry in the Soviet Union.

The Ministry of the Automotive industry operated about 300 plants and numerous research and development organizations. Most key facilities belonged to a production association, and most associations consisted of a lead final assembly plant and numerous satellite plants. Eight production associations produced nearly all trucks and about one-half of all buses; four produced almost all Soviet passenger cars. In the mid-1980s the ministry produced about 250 truck, 60 automobile, and 35 bus models and modifications and 50 types of trailers and attachments. The ministry also maintained its own internal R&D base for vehicle design and production technology development.

== History ==
Before 1965 the automotive industry was subordinate to several different administrative organizations including: the Central Administration of State Automotive Plants (1922-1941); the People's Commissariat for Medium Machine Building (1941-1945); the Ministry of the Automobile industry (1945-1947); the Ministry of the Automobile and Tractor Industry (1947-1953); the Ministry of Machine Building (1953-1954); and the Ministry of the Automobile Industry (1955-1957). In 1957 most industrial ministries were abolished and replaced with regional economic councils. In 1965 the present ministerial structure was introduced.

Production associations were introduced in the mid-1960s to increase manufacturing efficiency through a unified administrative structure that usually brings together in a single enterprise a major manufacturer and its principal suppliers. This structure is supposed to provide coordinated production programs among cooperating plants, more efficient use of resources, and more rapid assimilation of technological advances.

In November 1991 the Ministry became the Open Joint-Stock Company Avtoselkhozmash Holding.

== List of ministers ==
- Stepan Akopov (17.2.1946–18.4.1950)
- Ivan Khlamov (18.4.1950–15.3.1953)
- Stepan Akopov (19.4.1954–23.7.1955)
- G. Strokin (23.7.1955–10.5.1957)
- Aleksandr Tarasov (2.10.1965–28.6.1975)
- Viktor Poljakov (17.7.1975–18.10.1986)
- Nikolai Pugin (26.10.1986–2.10.1988)

== See also ==
- Automotive industry in the Soviet Union
