= 1950 Soviet Union legislative election =

- 12 March 1950
- Soviet of the Union
- All 678 seats in the Soviet of the Union
Party	Seats	+/–
All-Union Communist Party (Bolsheviks)	580	+4
Independents	98	−8
This lists parties that won seats. See the complete results below.
- Soviet of Nationalities
- All 638 seats in the Soviet of Nationalities
Party	Seats	+/–
All-Union Communist Party (Bolsheviks)	519	+10
Independents	119	−29
This lists parties that won seats. See the complete results below.
Chairman of the Council of Ministers before	Chairman of the Council of Ministers after
Joseph Stalin; VKP(b)	Joseph Stalin; VKP(b)

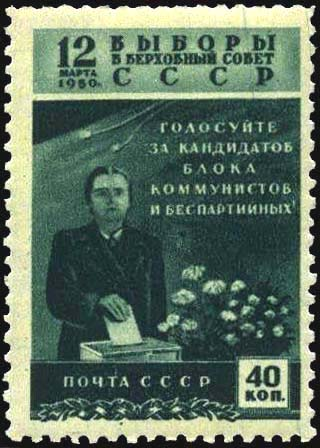
Postage stamp marking the election

Supreme Soviet elections were held in the Soviet Union on 12 March 1950.

== Electoral system ==
Candidates had to be nominated by the All-Union Communist Party (Bolsheviks) (CPSU) or by a public organisation. However, all public organisations were controlled by the party and were subservient to a 1931 law that required them to accept party rule. The CPSU itself remained the only legal party in the country.

Voters could in theory vote against the CPSU candidate, but could only do so by using polling booths, whereas votes for the party could be cast simply by submitting a blank ballot. Turnout was required to be over 50% for the election to be valid.

== Candidates ==
CPSU candidates accounted for around three quarters of the nominees, whilst many of the others were members of Komsomol.

== Results ==
=== Soviet of the Union ===
Party or alliance		Votes	%	Seats	+/–
BKB	All-Union Communist Party (Bolsheviks)	110,788,377	99.73	580	+4
BKB	Independents	110,788,377	99.73	98	–8
Against		300,146	0.27	–	–
Total		111,088,523	100.00	678	–4
Valid votes		111,088,523	100.00		
Invalid/blank votes		1,487	0.00		
Total votes		111,090,010	100.00		
Registered voters/turnout		111,116,373	99.98		
Source: Nohlen & Stöver

=== Soviet of Nationalities ===
Party or alliance		Votes	%	Seats	+/–
BKB	All-Union Communist Party (Bolsheviks)	110,782,009	99.72	519	+10
BKB	Independents	110,782,009	99.72	119	–29
Against		306,830	0.28	–	–
Total		111,088,839	100.00	638	–19
Valid votes		111,088,839	100.00		
Invalid/blank votes		1,619	0.00		
Total votes		111,090,458	100.00		
Registered voters/turnout		111,116,373	99.98		
Source: Nohlen & Stöver
