= Ministry of Construction (Soviet Union) =

Government ministry of the Soviet Union

The Ministry of Construction (Minstroy; Russian: Министерство строительства СССР) was a government ministry in the Soviet Union.

== History ==
A ukase of 15 March 1953 combined the Ministry of Construction of Heavy Industry Enterprises USSR and the Ministry of Construction of Machine-Building Enterprises USSR into the all-union Ministry of Construction USSR. Nikolay Aleksandrovich Dygay was appointed Minister of Construction USSR. In January 1954, D. Ya. Rayzer was First Deputy Minister of Construction USSR. Goldin was a Deputy Minister of Construction USSR in April 1954.

In August 1986 the construction ministries were reorganized by geographical regions. The Ministry of Construction was the basis for the Ministry of Construction in the Northern and Western Regions, while the Ministry of Industrial Construction was the basis for the Ministry of Construction in the Southern Regions. A Ministry of Construction in the Eastern Regions of the USSR was also established, becoming responsible for coordinating construction work from Lake Baikal to the Pacific coast.

== List of ministers ==
- 15 March 1953 – 10 May 1957: Nikolai Dygai
- 21 February 1967 – 25 January 1986: Georgi Karavajev
- 25 January 1986 – 2 September 1986: Vladimir Reshetilov
