= Ministry of Heavy Machine Building (Soviet Union) =

The Ministry of Heavy Machine Building (Mintyazhmash; Russian: Министерство тяжёлого машиностроения СССР) was a government ministry in the Soviet Union.

== History ==
The statute of the People's Commissariat of Heavy Machine Building was confirmed by a decree of the Council of People's Commissars on 23 April 1939. On 5 June 1941, when the Ministry of Machine Tool and Tool Building Industry was organized, it was given jurisdiction over a number of main administrations formerly belonging to the People's Commissariat of Heavy Machine Building.

With the reorganization of the Council of People's Commissars into the Council of Ministers in 1946, the People's Commissariat of Heavy Machine Building became the Ministry of Heavy Machine Building.

== List of ministers ==
- Vyacheslav Malyshev (19.6.1939 - 17.4.1940)
- Aleksandr Yefremov (17.4.1940 - 6.6.1941)
- Nikolai Kazakov (6.6.1941 - 6.3.1953; 19.4.1954 - 18.7.1955)
- Konstantin Petukhov (18.7.1955 - 10.5.1957)
- Vladimir Zhigalin (2.10.1965 - 8.4.1982)
- Sergei Afanasiev (8.4.1982 - 20.7.1987)
- Vladimir Velichko (17.7.1989 - 14.1.1991)
