= Ministry of State Farms =

Government ministry of the Soviet Union

The Ministry of State Farms (Russian: Министерство совхозов СССР) was a government ministry in the Soviet Union.

== History ==
The People's Commissariat of Grain and Animal Husbandry State Farm USSR (Nukemat Sovkhozov SSSR) was separated from the People's Commissariat of Agriculture USSR on 1 October 1932, and established as an all-union people's commissariat. This commissariat was reorganized as a union-republic people's commissariat by the Stalin Constitution in 1936.

On 15 March 1946, all people's commissariats became ministries, and the People's Commissariat of Grain and Animal Husbandry State Farm USSR became the Ministry of State Farms USSR, retaining its union-republic status.

The People's Commissariat of Grain and Animal Husbandry State Farms USSR had jurisdiction over grain, dairy, meat, swine-raising, livestock-raising, sheep-raising, and reindeer-raising sovkhozes. This jurisdiction was exercised directly with regard to sovkhozes of union subordination and indirectly (through republic commissariats) with regard to sovkhozes of republic subordination.

== List of ministers ==
- Tikhon Turkin (1.1.1931 – 4.4.1934)
- Moisei Kalmanovitsh (4.4.1934 – 12.4.1937)
- Nikolai Demtshenko (12.4.1937 – 22.7.1937)
- Tikhon Turkin (22.7.1937 – 12.12.1938)
- Pavel Lobanov (12.12.1938 – 11.11.1945)
- Nikolai Skvorcov (4.2.1947 – 15.3.1953)
- Aleksei Kozlov (15.3.1953 – 2.3.1955)
- Ivan Benediktov (2.3.1955 – 30.5.1957)
