= Maria Kovrigina =

Russian physician and politician (1910–1995)

- Мария Ковригина
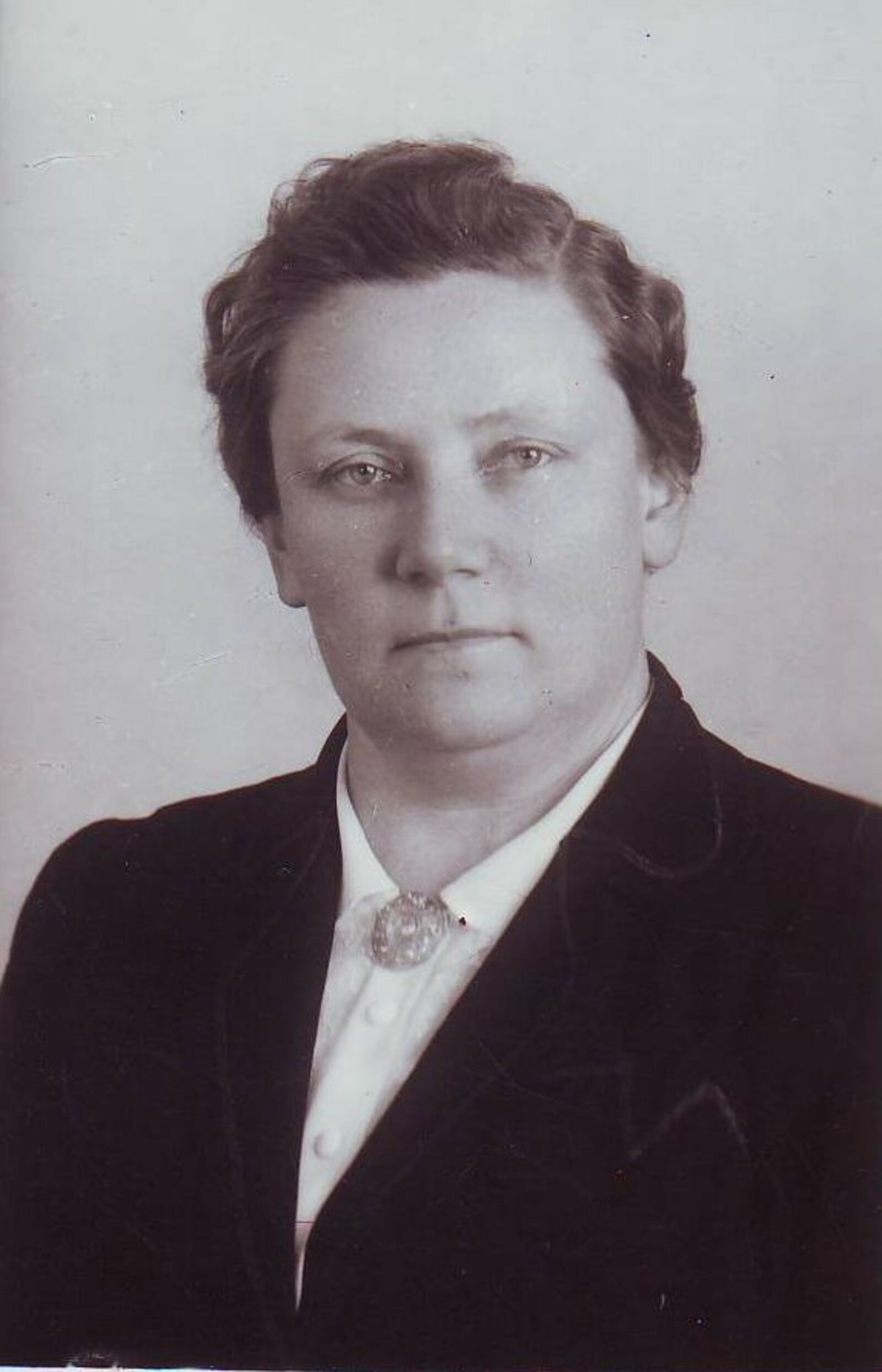

Minister of Health – Soviet Union
- In office 1 March 1954 – 12 January 1959
- Premier: Nikolai Bulganin; Georgy Malenkov
- Preceded by: Andrey Tretyakov
- Succeeded by: Sergei Kurashov

Minister of Health – Russian SFSR
- In office 2 December 1950 – 28 January 1953
- Premier: Boris Chernousov; Alexander Puzanov
- Preceded by: Georgy Beletsky
- Succeeded by: Vladimir Stepanov

Personal details
- Born: Maria Dmitrievna Kovrigina; 6 July 1910 Kamyshlovsky Uyezd, Perm Governorate, Russian Empire
- Died: 12 March 1995 (aged 84) Moscow, Russian Federation
- Resting place: Kuntsevo Cemetery
- Party: Communist Party
- Education: Sverdlovsk Medical Institute

Maria Dmitrievna Kovrigina (Russian: Мария Дмитриевна Ковригина; 6 July 1910 – 12 March 1995) was a Russian physician who served as the minister of health between 1953 and 1959 and was the first woman appointed to head a ministry at the All-Union level.

== Early life and education ==
Kovrigina was born in Urals in 1910 into a Russian family. In 1924 she joined the local Komsomol and became its secretary after three years.

In 1931 Kovrigina graduated from the worker's school. She obtained a degree in medicine. During her studies she joined the Communist Party.

== Career ==
Following her graduation Kovrigina began to work in Chelyabinsk and then was made the chief of staff of the regional department of health and education there. In September 1942 she was named the deputy minister of health, In this capacity she was responsible for the policies about the mother-child health. In 1950, she was appointed the minister of health which she held until 1957. When she was in office she managed to pass a law which lifted the prohibition of abortion in 1955. Then Kovrigina served as the director of the department of pathology at the Moscow Central Postgraduate Medical School.

=== Party career and views ===
Kovrigina was a member of the central committee of the Communist Party. She was also part of the Soviet Women’s Anti-Fascist Committee which was established in 1941 to support the gender equality project in the Soviet Union.

== Personal life and death ==
Kovrigina died in Moscow in 1995.

=== Awards ===
Kovrigina was awarded a medal for her activities in the siege of Leningrad during World War II.
