= Ivan Kabanov (politician) =

Soviet politician

- Иван Кабанов

Minister of Foreign Trade of the USSR
- In office August 24, 1953 – August 26, 1958
- Premier: Georgy Malenkov
- Preceded by: Pavel Kumykin
- Succeeded by: Nikolai Patolichev

Chairman of Gossnab of the USSR
- In office October 18, 1952 – March 15, 1953
- Premier: Joseph Stalin
- Preceded by: Lazar Kaganovich
- Succeeded by: position abolished; since 1965 — Veniamin Dymshits

Candidate for members of the Presidium of the CPSU Central Committee
- In office October 16, 1952 – March 5, 1953

Minister of the Electrotechnical Industry of the USSR
- In office March 19, 1946 – April 2, 1951
- Premier: Joseph Stalin
- Preceded by: position established
- Succeeded by: Dmitry Yefremov

People's Commissar of the Electrotechnical Industry of the USSR
- In office August 21, 1941 – March 15, 1946
- Premier: Joseph Stalin
- Preceded by: Vasily Bogatyryov
- Succeeded by: position abolished

People's Commissar of Food Industry of the USSR
- In office August 7, 1938 – January 19, 1939
- Premier: Vyacheslav Mikhailovich Molotov
- Preceded by: Abram Gilinsky
- Succeeded by: Vasily Zotov

People's Commissar of Municipal Economy of the RSFSR
- In office September 1937 – March 1938
- Premier: Nikolai Bulganin
- Preceded by: Nikolai Komarov
- Succeeded by: Pyotr Svetlov

Personal details
- Born: February 3, [O.S. 22 January] 1898 Novoe Usolye, Solikamsky Uyezd, Perm Governorate, Russian Empire
- Died: July 2, 1972 Moscow, USSR
- Resting place: Novodevichy Cemetery
- Party: CPSU (since 1917)
- Education: Kagan-Shabshaya State Electro-Machine Building Institute
- Awards: Order of Lenin (four times); Order of the Red Banner of Labour

Ivan Grigoryevich Kabanov (Russian: Иван Григорьевич Кабанов; February 3, [O.S. 22 January] 1898 – July 2, 1972) was a Soviet politician. He was a candidate for the members of the Presidium of the 19th Congress of the Communist Party of the Soviet Union from 1952 to 1953, Minister of Foreign Trade of the USSR from 1953 to 1958, and a laureate of the Stalin Prize in 1953.

== Biography ==
From 1911 to 1912, he was a student at the locksmith vocational school in Usolye, then a fitter-machinist, fitter-assembler at plants in Usolye and Bereznyaki in the Perm Governorate.

In 1916, he was conscripted into the army. In 1917, he joined the Russian Social Democratic Labour Party (Bolsheviks), and in 1918, joined the Red Army. He participated in the Russian Civil War as a commander, commissar, and head of the political department of various units of the Eastern and Western fronts.

From 1922 to 1927, he was involved in party work in Berezniaky and Sarapul as secretary of the regional Russian Communist Party (Bolsheviks), and was a member of the bureau of the district committee of the party, and as member of the bureau of the regional committee of the Communist Party of the Soviet Union.

From 1931, he served as the director of the Shterovskaya Power Plant (Donbas). In 1932, he joined the system of the People's Commissariat of Heavy Industry (Narkomtyazhprom), later holding engineering and technical positions at the Dynamo Plant (Moscow): engineer, head of the technical department.

From September 1937, he became the People's Commissar of Municipal Economy of the RSFSR, and from March 1938, he served as the Deputy Chairman of the Council of People's Commissars of the RSFSR.

In August 1938, he was appointed as the People's Commissar of the Food Industry of the USSR, but by January 19, 1939, he was transferred to the position of senior engineer in the laboratory at the Dynamo Plant. From January 1940, he became the chief engineer, and from November 1940, he served as the director of the plant.

From June 1941, he was the First Deputy Commissar, and from August 1941, he became the People's Commissar of the USSR's Electrotechnical Industry. During the Great Patriotic War, he led the evacuation of equipment and the construction of new energy facilities.

From 1943, he was a member of the Council on Radar under the State Defense Committee.

== Post-WW2 career ==
In 1945, he was involved in the Soviet atomic bomb project, specifically in the development of uranium enrichment technology using the electromagnetic method. He worked at the Special Design Bureau (SKB) at the Electrosila Plant.

In March 1946–April 1951, he served as the Minister of the Electrotechnical Industry.

From April 1951, he became the First Deputy Chairman, and from October 1952, he served as the Chairman of Gossnab.

In March 1953, Gossnab became part of Gosplan, and Kabanov was removed from the Politburo of the Communist Party of the Soviet Union and reassigned as the First Deputy Minister of Internal and External Trade of the USSR.

From 1953 to 1958, he served as the Minister of Foreign Trade of the USSR, and from 1958 to 1962, he was the Deputy Chairman of the Commission of the Presidium of the Council of Ministers of the USSR on Foreign Economic Activity and the Minister of the USSR.

He was a member of the CPSU Central Committee from 1952 to 1961, a candidate for the Presidium of the CPSU Central Committee from 1952 to 1953, and a deputy of the Supreme Soviet of the USSR in the 2nd (1946–1950), 4th, and 5th (1954–1962) convocations.

He was buried in Moscow at the Novodevichy Cemetery.

== Awards and Titles ==
- Laureate of the Stalin Prize, 1st degree (1953) for the development and implementation of the electromagnetic method for isotope separation and obtaining lithium-6.
- Awarded four Orders of Lenin and the Order of the Red Banner of Labour.

== Literature ==
- State Power of the USSR. Higher authorities and management and their leaders. 1923—1991 — Moscow, 1999. — P. 326.
