= Alexander Zasyadko =

Soviet politician

- Александр Засядько

Deputy Chairman of the Council of Ministers of the Soviet Union
- In office March 31, 1958 – November 9, 1962
- Prime Minister: Nikita Khrushchev

Chairman of the State Scientific and Economic Council of the Council of Ministers of the Soviet Union
- In office April 22, 1960 – November 9, 1962
- Prime Minister: Nikita Khrushchev
- Preceded by: Joseph Kuzmin
- Succeeded by: Peter Lomako

Head of the Coal Industry Department of the State Planning Committee of the Council of Ministers of the Soviet Union Minister of the Soviet Union
- In office May 24, 1957 – March 31, 1958
- Prime Minister: Nikita Khrushchev

Minister of the Coal Industry of the Soviet Union
- In office December 28, 1948 – March 2, 1955
- Prime Minister: Joseph Stalin; Georgy Malenkov
- Preceded by: Office established
- Succeeded by: Alexander Zademidko

Minister of the Coal Industry of the Western Regions of the Soviet Union
- In office January 17, 1947 – December 28, 1948
- Prime Minister: Joseph Stalin
- Preceded by: Dmitry Onika
- Succeeded by: Office abolished

Personal details
- Born: Alexander Fyodorovich Zasyadko; September 7, 1910 Gorlovka, Bakhmutsky Uyezd, Yekaterinoslav Governorate, Russian Empire
- Died: September 5, 1963 (aged 52) Moscow, Soviet Union
- Resting place: Novodevichy Cemetery
- Party: All–Union Communist Party (Bolsheviks) since 1931
- Education: Donetsk Mining Institute
- Awards: Hero of Socialist Labour; Order of Lenin; Order of the Red Banner of Labour Medals: Medal "For Labour Valour"; Medal "For Valiant Labour in the Great Patriotic War of 1941–1945"; Medal "For the Restoration of the Coal Mines of the Donetsk Basin"; Medal "In Commemoration of the 800th Anniversary of Moscow"

Alexander Fyodorovich Zasyadko (Russian: Александр Фёдорович Засядько; Ukrainian: Олександр Федорович Засядько; September 7, 1910 – September 5, 1963) was a Soviet economic, state and party leader.

He was a Hero of Socialist Labour (1957), Deputy of the Supreme Soviet of the Soviet Union of 2–6 Convocations and Member of the Central Committee of the Communist Party of the Soviet Union in 1952–1956 and 1961–1963.

== Biography ==
He was born on September 7, 1910, in the village of Gorlovka, Bakhmut Uyezd, Yekaterinoslav Governorate. His father was a miner.

From 1925–1927, he studied at the industrial school in Izyum. In 1935, he graduated from the Donetsk Mining Institute.

- From 1924–1925, he was an apprentice of a locksmith at the Lugansk Railway Carriage–Locomotive Plant;
- From 1927–1930, he a mechanic at Mine No. 8 in Gorlovka, a mechanic–fitter at the Mine Named After the United State Political Administration in Novoshakhtinsk (Azov–Black Sea Territory);
- From 1935, he was Chief Mechanic, Assistant Chief Engineer, Chief Engineer, Manager of Mine No. 10–bis;
- From 1939, Deputy Head of Glavugol, Head of the Stalinugol Combine;
- In 1941–1942 – Head of the Molotovugol Combine;
- In 1942–1943 – Deputy People's Commissar of the Coal Industry of the Soviet Union – Head of the Tulaugol Combine;
- In 1943–1946 – Deputy People's Commissar of the Coal Industry of the Soviet Union – Head of the Stalinugol Combine;
- In 1946–1947 – Deputy Minister of Construction of Fuel Enterprises of the Soviet Union;
- Since January 17, 1947, the Minister of the Coal Industry of the Western Regions of the Soviet Union;
- Since December 28, 1948, the Minister of the Coal Industry of the Soviet Union. According to Serov, in 1951, Zasyadko insisted on replenishing the coal industry enterprises with additional contingents of prisoners. In March 1955, he was relieved of his post "due to unsatisfactory work";
- Since March 2, 1955, Deputy Minister of the Coal Industry of the Soviet Union;
- Since August 8, 1955, to 1956 – Minister of the Coal Industry of the Ukrainian Soviet Socialist Republic;
- Since May 24, 1957, to March 31, 1958, Head of the Coal Industry Department of the State Planning Committee of the Council of Ministers of the Soviet Union – Minister of the Soviet Union;
- Since March 31, 1958 – Deputy Chairman of the Council of Ministers of the Soviet Union, at the same time, since April 22, 1960, Chairman of the State Scientific and Economic Council of the Council of Ministers of the Soviet Union;
- On November 9, 1962, he retired for health reasons.

He died on September 5, 1963, in Moscow.

== Awards ==
- Hammer and Sickle Medal (April 26, 1957);
- Five Orders of Lenin (February 17, 1939; October 20, 1943; January 1, 1948; September 4, 1948; April 26, 1957; September 6, 1960);
- Order of the Red Banner of Labour (August 29, 1953);
- Medals, including "For Labour Valour" (September 4, 1948).

== Remembrance ==
- Avenue in Donetsk bears his name;
- Zasyadko coal mine in Donetsk;
- Zasyadko Square in the town of Horlivka.

== Sources ==
- "Alexander Zasyadko". warheroes.ru (in Russian).
- "100 Famous Donetsk Citizens". Archived from the original on 2011-01-15.
- To the 100th Anniversary of Zasyadko
