= 1954 Soviet Union legislative election =

- 14 March 1954
- Soviet of the Union
- All 708 seats in the Soviet of the Union
Party	Seats	+/–
Communist Party	565	−15
Independents	143	+45
This lists parties that won seats. See the complete results below.
- Soviet of Nationalities
- All 639 seats in the Soviet of Nationalities
Party	Seats	+/–
Communist Party	485	−34
Independents	154	+35
This lists parties that won seats. See the complete results below.
Chairman of the Council of Ministers before	Chairman of the Council of Ministers after
Georgy Malenkov; CPSU	Georgy Malenkov; CPSU

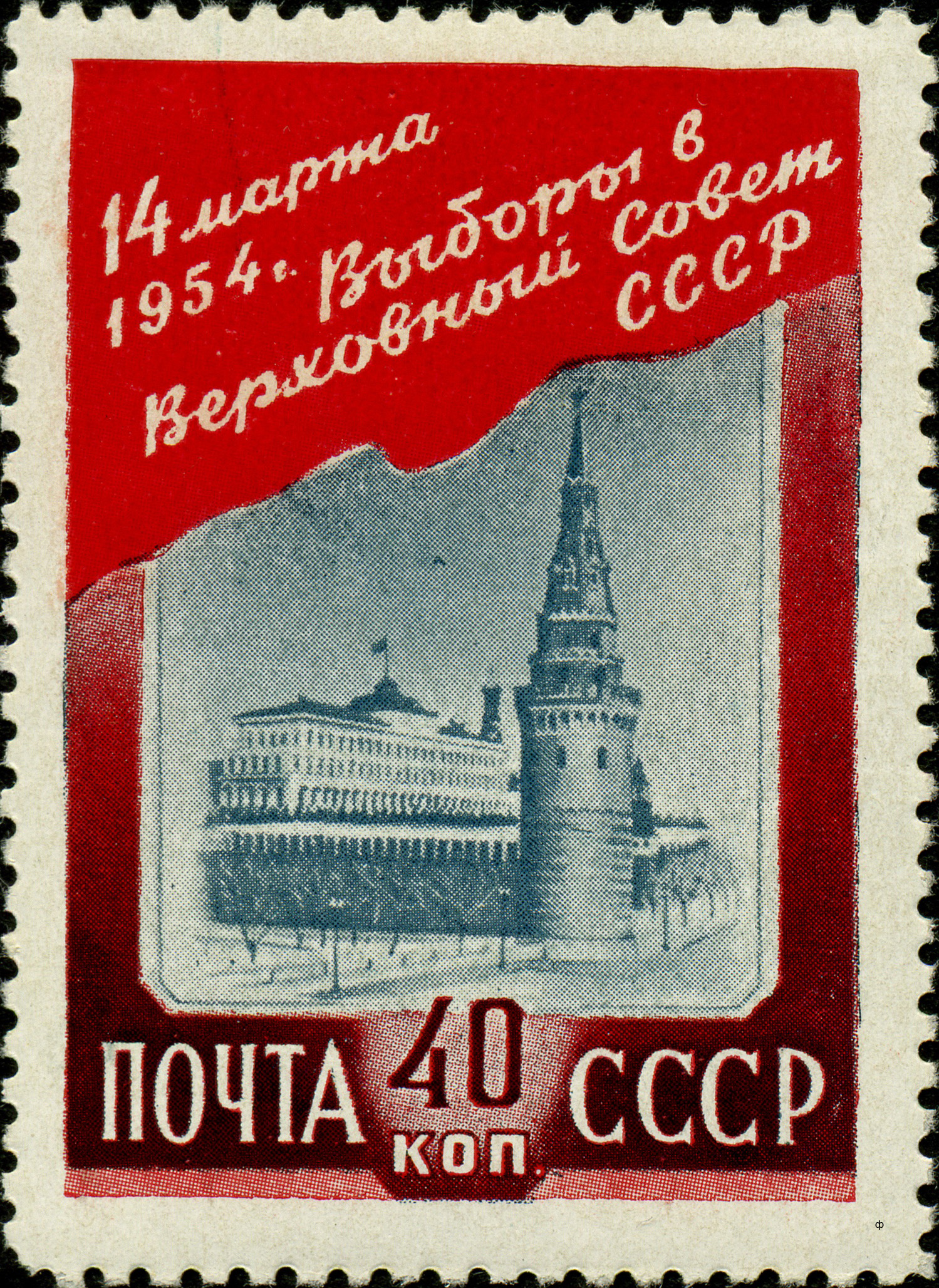
Stamp marking the 1954 elections

Supreme Soviet elections were held in the Soviet Union on 14 March 1954.

== Electoral system ==
Candidates had to be nominated by the Communist Party of the Soviet Union (CPSU) or by a public organisation. However, all public organisations were controlled by the party and were subservient to a 1931 law that required them to accept party rule. The CPSU itself remained the only legal party in the country.

Voters could vote against the CPSU candidate, but could only do so by using polling booths, whereas votes for the party could be cast simply by submitting a blank ballot. Turnout was required to be over 50% for the election to be valid.

== Candidates ==
CPSU candidates accounted for around three quarters of the nominees, whilst many of the others were members of Komsomol.

== Results ==
=== Soviet of the Union ===
Party or alliance		Votes	%	Seats	+/–
BKB	Communist Party of the Soviet Union	120,479,249	99.79	565	–15
BKB	Independents	120,479,249	99.79	143	+45
Against		247,897	0.21	–	–
Total		120,727,146	100.00	708	+30
Valid votes		120,727,146	100.00		
Invalid/blank votes		680	0.00		
Total votes		120,727,826	100.00		
Registered voters/turnout		120,750,816	99.98		
Source: Nohlen & Stöver

=== Soviet of Nationalities ===
Party or alliance		Votes	%	Seats	+/–
BKB	Communist Party of the Soviet Union	120,539,860	99.84	485	–34
BKB	Independents	120,539,860	99.84	154	+35
Against		187,357	0.16	–	–
Total		120,727,217	100.00	639	+1
Valid votes		120,727,217	100.00		
Invalid/blank votes		609	0.00		
Total votes		120,727,826	100.00		
Registered voters/turnout		120,750,816	99.98		
Source: Nohlen & Stöver
