= Ministry of the Chemical Industry (Soviet Union) =

The Ministry of Chemical Industry (Minkhimprom; Russian: Министерство химической промышленности СССР) was a government ministry in the Soviet Union.

The People's Commissariat of Chemical Industry was to coordinate and direct the following branches of the chemical industry: nitrogen, basic chemistry, mineral chemical, lacquer and paint, aniline dye, iodine and bromine, rubber, caoutchouc, and plastics.

== History ==
By ukase of the Presidium of the Supreme Soviet of 28 March 1941, the People's Commissariat of Rubber Industry USSR was established. It was to include enterprises producing caoutchouc, rubber, tires, and asbestos.

The People's Commissariat of Chemical Industry and the People's Commissariat of Rubber Industry appear to have existed independently from 1941 to 1948. Both were presumably reorganized into ministries in 1946, at the time the Council of People's Commissars was converted into the Council of Ministers.

By ukase of the Presidium of the Supreme Soviet of 2 August 1948, the Ministry of Chemical Industry and the Ministry of Rubber Industry were consolidated into the Ministry of Chemical Industry. This was done in order to expand and utilize more completely the production capacities of the enterprises involved, to insure the complex development of the chemical industry, to utilize better the increased cadres of qualified specialists, and to reduce administrative costs.

== List of ministers ==
- Mikhail Denisov (24.1.1939 - 26.2.1942)
- Mikhail Pervukhin (26.2.1942 - 17.1.1950)
- Sergei Tikhomirov (17.1.1950 - 9.6.1958)
- Leonid Kostandov (2.10.1965 - 6.11.1980)
- Vladimir Listov (6.11.1980 - 17.6.1986)
- Juri Bespalov (17.6.1986 - 17.7.1989)
