= Ministry of Non-Ferrous Metallurgy =

Government ministry of the Soviet Union

The Ministry of Non-Ferrous Metallurgy (Mintsvetmet; Russian: Министерство цветной металлургии СССР) was a government ministry in the Soviet Union.

== History ==
The All-Union People's Commissariat of Non-ferrous Metallurgy was formed by ukase of the Presidium Supreme Soviet USSR, on 24 January 1939, following subdivision of the All-Union People's Commissariat of Heavy Industry into six separate commissariats.

The following enterprises were placed under the jurisdiction of the People's Commissariat of Non-ferrous Metallurgy; copper-mining and copper-Smelting industries, zinc-industry enterprises, lead-industry enterprises, aluminum-industry enterprises, nickel-industry enterprises, gold- and platinum-industry enterprises, rare-metals, and tin-industry enterprises, enterprises for processing non-ferrous metals, and enterprises for procuring, processing, and distributing non-ferrous-metal scrap.

In June 1939, the Main Administration of Food Supply for Workers of the Gold and Platinum Industry (Glavzolotoprodsnab) was established, with a number of regional offices placed under this administration. On 15 March 1946, all People's Commissariats were changed into ministries by decree of the Supreme Soviet USSR.

On 28 December 1950, the Presidium of the Supreme Soviet USSR issued ukase ordering the division of the Ministry of Metallurgical Industry USSR into two ministries, Ministry of Ferrous Metallurgy USSR and Ministry of Non-ferrous Metallurgy USSR, and the transfer of enterprises and organizations to the respective ministries, according to a list approved by the Council of Ministers USSR. The Presidium appointed Pyotr Lomako as Minister of Non-ferrous Metallurgy USSR, and Ivan Arkhipov as First Deputy Minister of Non-ferrous Metallurgy.

== List of ministers ==
- Aleksandr Samokhvalov (24 January 1939 – 9 July 1940)
- Pjotr Lomako (9 July 1940 – 2 November 1986)
- Vladimir Durasov (2 November 1986 – 17 July 1989)
