= Ministry of Foreign Trade (Soviet Union) =

Ministry of the USSR

The Ministry of Foreign Trade (Russian: Министерство внешней торговли СССР; Minvneshtorg) was a government ministry in the Soviet Union.

The foreign trade of the USSR was a government monopoly and was conducted by the Ministry of Foreign Trade. This ministry maintained control over the planning and operation of foreign trade through main administrations for imports and exports and for certain large geographical areas, as well as through foreign-trade corporations holding monopolies for specific commodities or services.

Postwar industrialization and an expansion of foreign trade resulted in the proliferation of all-union foreign trade organizations (FTOs), the new name for foreign trade corporations and also known as foreign trade association.

== History ==
In 1946 the People's Commissariat of Foreign Trade was reorganized into the Ministry of Foreign Trade. The Ministry of Foreign Trade, through its FTOs, retained the exclusive right to negotiate and sign contracts with foreigners and to draft foreign trade plans.

The Ministry of Foreign Trade was merged with the Ministry of Internal Trade on 15 March 1953 and was restored to separate status six months later, on 15 September.

The State Committee for Foreign Economic Relations (Russian: Gosudarstvennyi komitet po vneshnim ekonomicheskim sviaziam — GKES), created in 1955, managed all foreign aid programs and the export of complete factories through the FTOs subordinate to it. Certain ministries, however, had the right to deal directly with foreign partners through their own FTOs.

On January 17, 1988, Izvestia reported the abolition of the Ministry of Foreign Trade and GKES. These two organizations were merged into the newly created Ministry of Foreign Economic Relations, which had responsibility for administering foreign trade policy and foreign aid agreements. Other legislation provided for the establishment of joint enterprises. The government retained its monopoly on foreign trade through a streamlined version of the Soviet foreign trade bureaucracy as it existed before the January 17 decree.

== List of ministers ==
- Leonid Krasin (6.7.1923–18.11.1925)
- Aleksandr Cyurupa (18.11.1925–6.1.1926)
- Lev Kamenev (8.1.1926–14.8.1926)
- Anastas Mikoyan (15.8.1926–22.10.1930)
- Arkadi Rozenholz (5.11.1930–14.6.1937)
- Evgeni Chivyalev (19.1.1938–30.11.1938)
- Anastas Mikoyan (30.11.1938–4.3.1949)
- Mikhail Menshikov (4.3.1949–10.11.1951)
- Pavel Kumykin (10.11.1951–?)
- Ivan Kabanov (15.9.1953–26.8.1958)
- Nikolai Patolichev (26.8.1958–19.10.1985)
- Boris Aristov (19.10.1985–16.1.1988)
- Konstantin Katushev (16.1.1988–28.8.1991)
- Valeri Mangazeyev (28.8.1991-26.12.1991)

== See also ==
- Foreign trade of the Soviet Union
