= Ministry of Higher Education (Soviet Union) =

Government ministry of the Soviet Union

- Министерство высшего образования СССР

Agency overview
- Formed: 1946
- Preceding agencies: All-Union Committee for Higher Education; Ministry of National Education of the Russian Empire
- Dissolved: 1988
- Jurisdiction: Government of the Soviet Union
- Headquarters: Moscow
- Parent agency: Council of Ministers of the USSR

The Ministry of Higher Education (Minvuz; Russian: Министерство высшего образования СССР) was a government ministry in the Soviet Union.

== History ==
The predecessor of the Ministry of Higher Education USSR, the Committee for Higher School Affairs under the Council of People's Commissars USSR, was established by decree of the Central Executive Committee and the Council of People's Commissars, for the purpose of uniting and directing the administration of higher education in the USSR. The committee was also entrusted with the academic and methodological supervision of secondary special educational institutions.

The Presidium Supreme Soviet USSR, issued a ukase on 10 April 1946, "On the Reorganization of the Committee for Higher School Affairs Into the Union-Republic Ministry of Higher Education USSR". At this time, it was in charge of all the VUZy, institutes of higher education (or universities), and SSUZy, technical schools for training semi-professional personnel, like nurses, para-medics, teachers, and librarians. Despite the designation of union-republic, however, there are no equivalent Ministries of Higher Education in the RSFSR and the 15 union republics; in the various republics, higher educational affairs are handled by a main administration of higher educational institutions under the Ministry of Education of the republic.

Many of the changes made to the Ministry of Higher Education (or MinVUZ as it was abbreviated after June 1959) had to do with the administration of these institutes for training semi-professionals. During the post-Stalin years, for instance, the SSUZy were subordinated both to the Ministry of Higher Education and to the ministries that employed their graduates. According to Dainovski, most of this joint administration was held with the ministries of Enlightenment, Agriculture, Health and Culture.

Khrushchev made some changes through Gosplan; however, his reform-minded approach to governance extended little into education. In May 1957, regional economic councils were granted control over the VUZy of their respected areas. However, this control was withdrawn shortly thereafter in 1965. A more successful venture into strengthening republican interests started in 1959 when ministerial offices (of MinVUZ) were set up in the RSFSR, Ukraine and Belarus. Higher committees for higher and secondary education appeared in other republics.

Structural changes were much more thorough during Brezhnev's leadership, who showed “a lively interest in the state machinery.” A decree was promulgated on 3 September 1966 that empowered MinVUZ to take greater control of the VUZy that it had administered jointly with the other ministries. The decree would also make these VUZy centres for ‘elaborating and generalising materials on teaching methods, compiling textbooks and training or retraining research and teaching staff.’ The inspection of all VUZy and SSUZy now came under the purview of MinVUZ, which was also given the power to dismiss the heads of individual institutions as well as nominate potential candidates. This power was given in a second major enactment promulgated on 18 July 1972.

In 1988 it was reorganized into the State Committee for Higher and Specialized Secondary Education.

== List of ministers ==
- Sergey Kaftanov (10.4.1946 - 9.2.1951)
- Vsevolod Stoletov (9.2.1951 - 15.3.1953)
- Vyacheslav Elyutin (9.3.1954 - 16.7.1985)
- Gennadi Yagodin (16.7.1985 - 8.3.1988)
