= Pyotr Lomako =

Soviet politician and economist

- Пётр Ломако

Chairman of State Planning Committee
- In office 24 November 1962 – 2 October 1965
- Deputies: Sergei Stepanov; Anatoly Korobov; Alexei Goreglyad; Nikolai Tikhonov
- Preceded by: Veniamin Dymshits
- Succeeded by: Nikolai Baibakov

Minister Non-Ferrous Metallurgy
- In office 2 October 1965 – 31 October 1986
- Premier: Alexei Kosygin; Nikolai Tikhonov; Nikolai Ryzhkov
- Preceded by: None—post established
- Succeeded by: None—post abolished
- In office 28 December 1950 – 10 May 1957
- Premier: Joseph Stalin; Georgy Malenkov; Nikolai Bulganin
- Preceded by: None—post established
- Succeeded by: None—post abolished
- In office 9 July 1940 – 26 June 1948
- Premier: Joseph Stalin
- Preceded by: Alexander Samokhvalov
- Succeeded by: None—post abolished

Personal details
- Born: 12 July 1904; Temryuk, Kuban oblast, Russian Empire
- Died: 27 May 1990 (aged 85); Moscow, Soviet Union
- Political party: Communist Party of the Soviet Union (1925–1989)

Pyotr Fadeyevich Lomako (Russian: Пётр Фаде́евич Лома́ко; 12 July 1904 – 27 May 1990) was a Soviet politician and economist, head of Gosplan between 1962 and 1965. During the Second World War, he was responsible for overseeing the evacuation of Soviet industry to the Ural Mountains region. He was a seven-time recipient of the Order of Lenin, and also received the golden medal of the Hero of Socialist Labour.

== Early life ==
Pyotr Lomako was born to a family of peasant laborers on 12 July 1904 (O.S.: 29 June) in Temryuk, Krasnodar. He studied for three years at the Plekhanov Institute of the National Economy before graduating in 1932 from the Moscow Institute of Nonferrous Metals and Gold. Between 1932 and 1939 he worked as an industrial manager: as a foreman, master, chief of shop, and then assistant to the chief engineer of a factory in Leningrad, and then from 1937 as director of a nonferrous metals factory in the Ivanovo region.

== Political career ==
Lomako joined the Communist Party in 1925. In 1939 he was made an assistant to the People's Commissar (Narkom) for Nonferrous Metallurgy, and in 1940 he was promoted to the post of Narkom. Lomako was a Deputy of the Supreme Soviet of the Soviet Union, being elected in the 2nd and the 4th through 8th elections to the body, serving between 1946 and 1950 and 1954 to 1989.

=== Second World War ===
As an industrial Narkom, Lomako played an important role in maintaining Soviet industry after the outbreak of war in 1941. In particular, he was responsible for managing the mass evacuation of Soviet industry to the Ural mountains region.

=== Post-War ===
Following the Second World War, Lomako remained Narkom and subsequently Minister of Non-Ferrous Metallurgy until 1948. Between 1948 and 1950, he served as Deputy Minister for the Iron and Steel Industry. He was returned to original portfolio as a Minister in 1950, and then made Deputy Minister for Iron and Steel once again in 1951, before serving for a third time as Minister for Nonferrous Metallurgy between 1954 and 1957.

In 1957 Lomako left Sovmin, becoming Chairman of the Krasnoyarsk People's Economic Council (Sovnarkhoz), a position he held until 1961.

=== Party career ===
Lomako was a candidate member of the Central Committee of the CPSU at the 19th and 20th Congresses of the CPSU. At the 22nd Congress of the CPSU in 1961, he was elected as a member, and became Vice-President of the RSFSR Bureau of the Committee, where he served until 1962.

Lomako was deselected from the Central Committee at the 25th Party Congress in 1976.

=== Chairman of Gosplan ===
Pyotr Lomako was selected to succeed Veniamin Dymshits as Chairman of Gosplan, the State Planning Committee, on 24 November 1962. Lomako oversaw the transitional period between Nikita Khrushchev and Leonid Brezhnev, and was therefore responsible for coordinating the Soviet economy at a time of economic uncertainty. As Lomako was also Deputy Chairman of Sovmin during this period, he fell under the direct influence of Alexei Kosygin, the reformist Premier.

Lomako was responsible for coordinating a reformist economic policy, and is argued by contemporary Western analysts such as G. W. Simmonds to have been removed by Brezhnev in 1965 as part of a bid to weaken Kosygin's power and reintroduce economic conservatism.

After his removal from Gosplan, Lomako served as Minister for Non-Ferrous Metallurgy until 1985. He died in 1990 at the age of 85.

== Sources ==
- (in Russian) "Lomako, Pyotr Fadeyevich" in the Great Soviet Encyclopedia, 3rd edition, Moscow 1972.
- (in Russian) Biography at Khronos, accessed 7 July 2009

Government offices
Preceded by Veniamin Dymshits	Chairman of the State Planning Committee; 1962–1965	Succeeded by Nikolai Baibakov
