= Stepan Akopov =

Soviet politician (1899–1958)

- Born: 14 December 1899; Tbilisi, Russian Empire
- Died: 9 August 1958 (aged 58); Moscow, Soviet Union
- Education: Moscow Institute of Mechanical Engineering
- Occupation: Engineer

Stepan Akopov (Russian: Степан Акопов; 14 December 1899 – 9 August 1958) was a Soviet engineer and politician who held several cabinet posts. He was a member of the Communist Party of Armenia and Communist Party of the Soviet Union.

== Biography ==
Akopov was born in Tbilisi on 14 December 1899 into an Armenian family. Between 1919 and 1921 he served as the secretary of the Communist Youth of Georgia. In October 1919 he became a member of the Communist Party. He was a graduate of the Moscow Institute of Mechanical Engineering (1922–1924). Following his graduation he worked at different state institutions and at the different units of Communist Party of Armenia, including the head of Yerevan branch of the Party and its central committee secretary. He was part of the group close to Lavrentiy Beria.

Akopov was named as the deputy commissar of heavy machinery of the Soviet Union in 1939 and was the first vice commissar of the ministry from May to October 1940. He was made first deputy commissar of medium machine building which he held until 1941 when he was appointed people's commissar of medium machine building. He served in the post until 1946. He was the commissar of automotive industry for one year between 1946 and 1947. Then he served as the minister of automobile and tractor industry from 1947 to 1950. He was appointed deputy minister for agricultural engineering in April 1950 and first deputy minister in March 1953. He was minister of engineering between June 1953 and April 1954 and was named as the minister of automotive, tractor and agricultural machinery between in April 1954. First Secretary of Communist Party Nikita Khrushchev publicly denounced Akopov in the January 1955 plenum due to the malfunction of the domestic machines. In July 1955 Akopov retired from public offices. He died in Moscow on 9 August 1958.

== Awards ==
- Order of Lenin three times
- Order of Kutuzov 1st class
- Order of the Red Banner of Labour
- Order of the Red Star
