= Ivan Tevosian =

Soviet diplomat (1902–1958)

- Иван Тевосян; Հովհաննես Թևոսյան
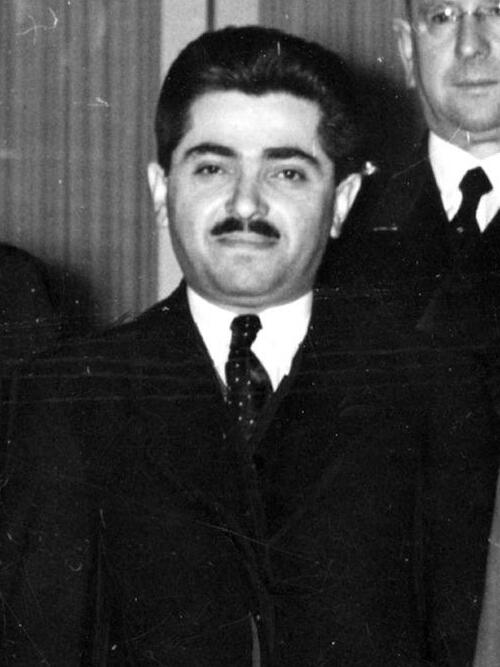
- Tevosian in 1939

Deputy Chairman of the Council of Ministers
- In office 7 December 1953 – 28 December 1956
- Premier: Georgy Malenkov; Nikolai Bulganin
- In office 13 June 1949 – 15 March 1953
- Premier: Joseph Stalin

People's Commissar for Ferrous Metallurgy
- In office 17 April 1940 – 29 July 1948
- Premier: Vyacheslav Molotov; Joseph Stalin
- Preceded by: Fjodor Merkulov
- Succeeded by: Anatoli Kuzmin

Candidate member of the 19th Presidium
- In office 16 October 1952 – 6 March 1953

Personal details
- Born: 4 January 1902 Shusha, Russian Empire
- Died: 30 March 1958 (aged 56) Moscow, Soviet Union
- Party: Communist Party of the Soviet Union (1919–1958)
- Profession: Civil servant
- Awards: Hero of Socialist Labour, Order of Lenin two times, Medal "For Labour Valour"

Ivan Fyodorovich (Hovhannes Tevadrosovich) Tevosian (Russian: Иван Федорович (Тевадросович) Тевосян, Armenian: Հովհաննես Թևատրոսի Թևոսյան; 1902 – 1958) was a Soviet politician of Armenian descent. Hero of Socialist Labor (1943).

Since 1919 Tevosian was the secretary of Russian Communist Party Baku underground committee. Tevosian participated to the 10th Conference of the party.

After finishing the Academy of Mountains in 1927, he worked as the chief engineer of "Elektrostal" factory (Moscow oblast). In 1939-40 he was the Shipbuilding Minister of USSR, in 1940-48 - the Minister of Black Metallurgy, in 1948-49 and again, in the 1950s - the Minister of Metallurgy of USSR, vice-chairman of the Soviet government. Since 1956 Tevosian was the Ambassador of the USSR in Japan.
