= Ivan Benediktov =

Soviet politician (1902–1983)

- Иван Бенедиктов

Minister of Agriculture
- In office 1946–1953
- Preceded by: Andrey Andreyev
- Succeeded by: Alexei Kozlov
- In office 1953–1955
- Preceded by: Alexei Kozlov
- Succeeded by: Vladimir Matskevich

People's Commissars for Agriculture
- In office 1938–1943
- Preceded by: Robert Eikhe
- Succeeded by: Andrey Andreyev

Personal details
- Born: 23 March 1902 Vichuga, Russian Empire
- Died: 30 July 1983 (aged 81) Moscow, Soviet Union
- Resting place: Novodevichy cemetery, Moscow, Soviet Union
- Party: Communist Party
- Education: Timiryazev Agricultural Academy

Ivan Aleksandrovich Benediktov (Russian: Иван Александрович Бенедиктов; 23 March 1902 – 30 July 1983) was a Soviet official who served in different posts, including People's Commissars for Agriculture, then Minister of Agriculture and Soviet ambassador to India and to Yugoslavia. He was a long-term member of the Central Committee of the Communist Party.

== Early life and education ==
Benediktov was born in Vichuga, Kineshma district, Kostroma Oblast, on 23 March 1902. In the period 1920-1923 he attended the Pokrovsky workers' faculty in Moscow. From 1923 to 1927 he attended the Faculty of Economics at the Timiryazev Agricultural Academy.

== Career ==
Benediktov was the as deputy chief of the collective farm system in Uzbekistan. In 1930 he became a member of the Communist Party. In 1931-37, he was Deputy Director of the Moscow Region Trust for vegetable growing collective farms.

He was appointed people's commissar of collective farms in the Russian Soviet Federative Socialist Republic (RSFSR) in 1937 and Soviet commissar of agriculture in April 1938. In the latter post Benediktov succeeded Robert Eikhe and was in office until 1943. In 1939 Benediktov was appointed a member of the central committee, and his term ended in 1941.

In 1946 Benediktov was appointed minister of agriculture. In 1952 he was again made the central committee member which he held until 1971. His ministerial tenure ended in 1953 when he was named Soviet ambassador to India which he held less than one year. In 1954 he was again appointed minister of agriculture.

No official explanation was given for his removal and reinstatement, but the historian Robert Conquest noted that when high ranking officials were transferred abroad in the 1950s, it was a sign of the power struggles that followed Joseph Stalin's death in March 1953. Benediktov's appointment as ambassador to India was announced on 15 March 1954, when the police chief, Lavrentiy Beria, was at the height of his influence. He was reinstated as minister for agriculture on 1 September that year, after Beria's arrest. Beria was accused at his subsequent trial of trying to "undermine the collective farm system." Though the nature of Beria's offence was never made public, Conquest noted that Benediktov and Stalin's eventual successor, Nikita Khrushchev, had both advocated amalgamating the collective farms into larger units, which officials associated with Beria openly attacked as "fantasy."

But only six months after his reinstatement, Benediktov was accused by Khrushchev of being "engulfed in bureaucracy." Due to criticisms he was removed from the office and appointed to the same post for the RSFSR. In 1959 he was again named the Soviet ambassador to India where he served until 1967.

One of the most significant events during his diplomatic service in India was about the defection of Svetlana Alliluyeva, Josef Stalin's daughter. She was there to finalize the funeral ceremony of her common-law husband and Indian communist Brajesh Singh by dispersing his ashes into the river Ganges per the Inhdian traditions. After the ceremony she asked to have an official permission to stay there through the Soviet ambassador, Ivan Benediktov. However, her request was not accepted, and instead, she was ordered to return to the Soviet Union, but she did not return to her native country and defected to the United States. She narrated the events as follows:

Everything in his house bore the marks of conventional bad taste - carpets everywhere, bad pictures on the walls in heavy gilt frames. Everything was sumptuous and resplendent, but there was nothing to rest one's eyes on. Just as sumptuous and ponderous was Madame Benediktov, with her formal smile. And, of course, Benediktov himself, tall, of immense proportions, and with a face as immobile as a monument [...] The Benediktovs were transients in India. All they longed for was to 'complete their term', buy a heap of luxuries, and return home.

Benediktov's term ended in April 1967 shortly after the defection of Svetlana Alliluyeva, and he was appointed Soviet ambassador to Yugoslavia which he held until 1971.

== Personal life and death ==
Benediktov died in Moscow on 30 July 1983 and was buried there in the Novodevichy cemetery.

=== Awards ===
Benediktov was the recipient of the following: Order of Lenin (four times), Order of the October Revolution, Order of the Red Banner of Labor (twice) and Order of Friendship of Peoples.
