= Vyacheslav Malyshev =

Russian engineer and politician in the USSR

- Вячеслав Малышев
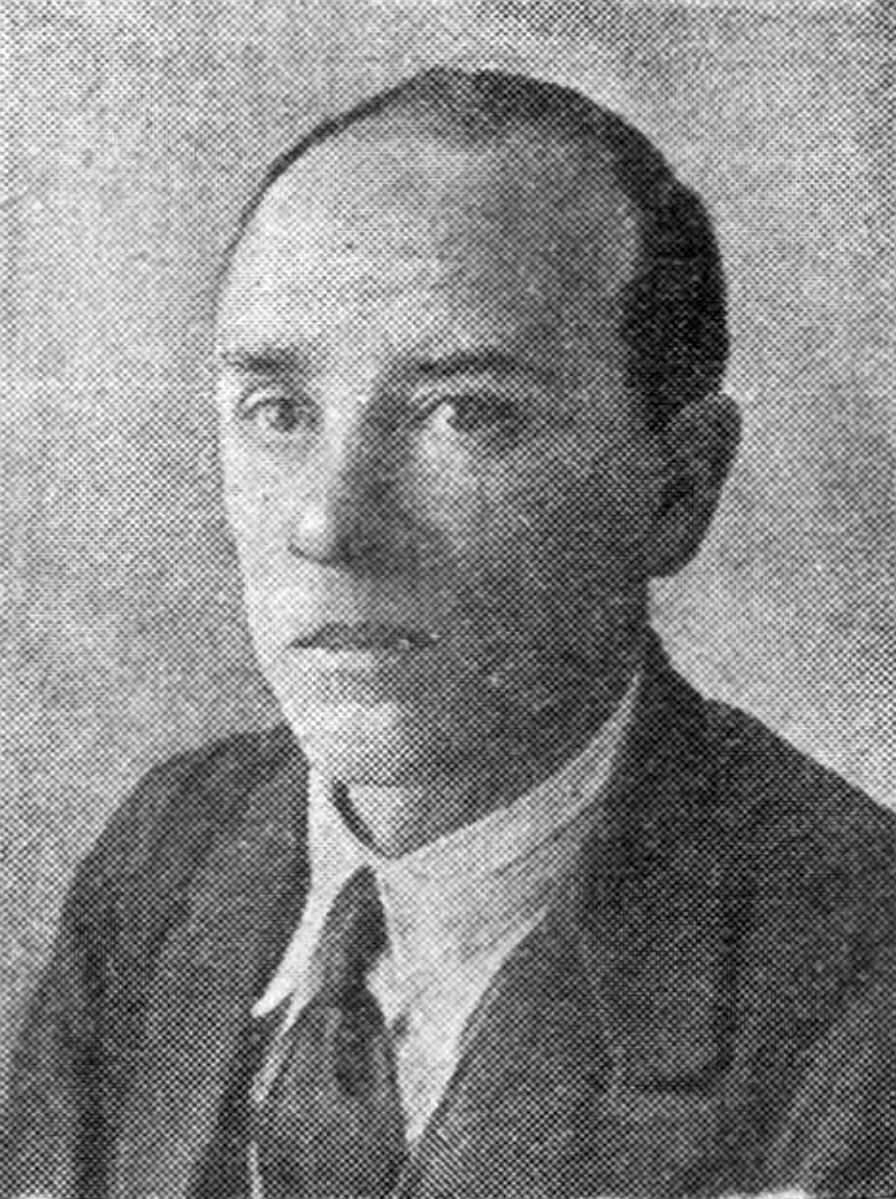
- Malyshev, c. 1938

People's Commissar for Heavy Machine Building
- In office 19 June 1939 – 17 April 1940
- Preceded by: Post established
- Succeeded by: Aleksandr Yefremov

Minister of Medium Machine Building
- In office 17 July 1953 – 28 February 1957
- Preceded by: Post established
- Succeeded by: Avraami Zavenyagin

Full member of the 19th Presidium
- In office 16 October 1952 – 6 March 1953

Personal details
- Born: December 3, 1902 Ust-Sysolsk, Russian Empire
- Died: September 20, 1957 (aged 54) Moscow, Russian SFSR, Soviet Union
- Cause of death: Acute radiation syndrome
- Resting place: Kremlin Wall Necropolis, Moscow
- Citizenship: Soviet
- Party: Communist Party of the Soviet Union (1926–1957)
- Education: Bauman School
- Occupation: Engineer, politician
- Known for: Soviet program of nuclear weapon
- Awards: Order of Lenin (1952); Stalin Prize (1949, 1951); Hero of Socialist Labor (1944)

Vyacheslav Aleksandrovich Malyshev (Russian: Вячеслав Александрович Малышев; 3 December 1902 — 20 February 1957) was a Soviet politician and an engineer who was one of the senior program managers in the Soviet program of nuclear weapons during the 1940s and 1950s.

He was instrumental in militarizing the Soviet space program while he also played a crucial role in Russian development of the nuclear submarines for the former Soviet Navy. Malyshev died in 1957, aged 54.

== Early life ==
Malyshev was born on 16 December 1902 in Ust'-Sysol'sk, Russian Empire, the son of teachers Alexander Nikolaevich Malyshev and Elena Konstantinovna Popova. He has one brother, A. Aleksandrovich Malyshev. The family moved to Velikiye Luki in 1904 after Malyshev's father accepted another teaching job.

Between 1918 and 1920, he worked as a secretary for Velikiye Luki's People's Court. In 1920, he began attending the Railway Technology School in town and working as a locksmith at a railway depot in Podmoskovye. After graduating in 1924, he worked as a locksmith, mechanic, machinist, and steam locomotive driver.

In 1926, he joined the Communist Party of the Soviet Union and shortly afterwards was drafted into the Red Army, where he served for a year as the secretary for the base's party committee as a Commissar. After his discharge from the Red Army in 1927, he worked as a driver at a depot near Moscow

== Engineering and political career ==
He graduated from Bauman Moscow State Technical University in 1934 and began working at the Kuybyshev Locomotive Factory, where he moved from designer to director in under five years. Other jobs he held during this time were instructor and mechanic.

In 1939, Malyshev was appointed to the Ministry of Heavy Machine Building but turned down the role, saying he was not yet ready. Instead, he was assigned to the People's Commissariat of Medium Engineering, later identified by the American intelligence as lead agency overseeing the Soviet program of nuclear weapons. He took on the role of Deputy Chairman of the Council of People's Commissars of the Soviet Union in 1940 as well.

In 1943, he was appointed to the People's Commissariat of the Tank Industry. He had jokingly been called the "Prince of Tankograd" for a number of years because of the engineering progress he made. In 1945, he was named a Colonel General of Engineering and Technical Services and headed the People's Commissariat of Transport Engineering, where he stayed until 1947. From 1947 to early 1953, he headed the State Committee of the USSR Council of Ministers (NKVD) on new technology, and from late 1953 to 1956, he served as the Deputy President of the (NKVD). In 1948, he became the Head of the NKVD and the Chariaman of the USSR State Engineering Committee. By 1950, he was the Minister of the USSR Shipbuilding Industry. Between October 1952 and March 1953, he was a member of the 19th Presidium of the Central Party. Afterwards, he was briefly part of Transport and Heavy Engineering before moving back to Medium Engineering.

He was a favorite of Stalin's and was called upon frequently for counsel. After Stalin's death in 1953, Malyshev's job titles changed several times and was suspected to have become the Chief of the Soviet Atomic Energy Commission after for a period. He did, at some point, head the nuclear program alongside Boris Vannikov. He was among the engineers that built the Soviet's first nuclear submarine.

In the mid-1950s, he headed a committee to investigate the explosion that destroyed the Novorossiysk, an Italian battleship the Soviets commandeered after World War II despite Malyshev's attempts to convince Stalin not to take it on in 1946. This was used as an excuse to prevent Nikolai Kuznetsov, who opposed Nikita Khrushchev's idea of a submarine-based navy, from commanding the Red Fleet and replace him with Sergey Gorshkov, who was much more obedient to the premier's wishes.

In 1957, he was again the Minister of Machine Building and the former First Deputy Premier of the Soviet Union.

== Death ==
There were reports in February 1957 of a "mystery patient" or "Patient X" who was treated by a German blood specialist; his identity as Malyshev was secret until his death within the month. The New York Times reported his cause of death as leukemia but he ultimately died of acute radiation syndrome after inspecting a Soviet nuclear plant before it was safe to do so. His ashes are buried at the Kremlin Wall Necropolis.

== Awards ==
He was a Laureate of the USSR State Prize for overseeing the first nuclear and hydrogen charges, the first nuclear power plant, the first nuclear ship, and the first satellite of the Earth. He received the Hero of Socialist Labour Award for his work on tanks in 1944. He was awarded with the Order of Lenin on 16 December 1952. He received the State Stalin Prize twice.
