= Ministry of Food Industry =

Government ministry of the Soviet Union

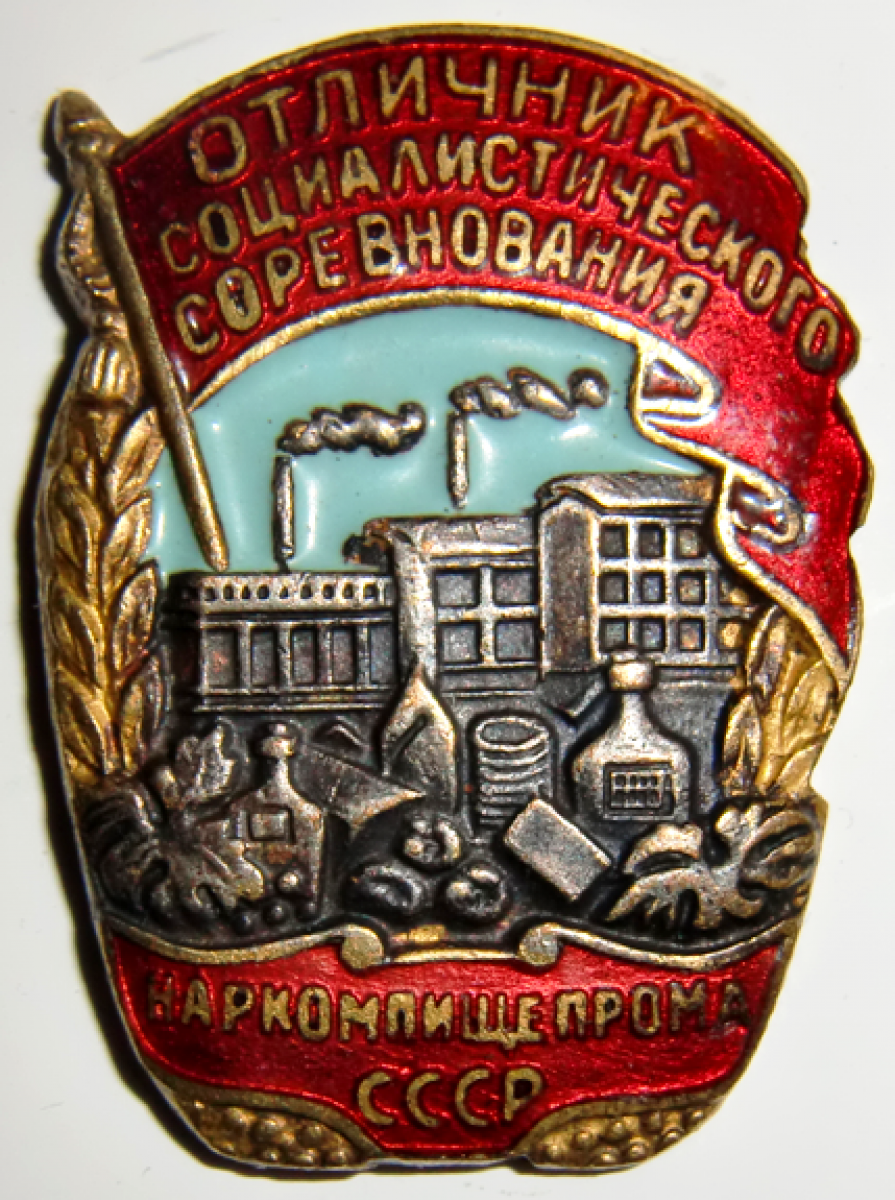
Badge "Excellence in Socialist Competition of the People's Commissariat for Food Industry of the USSR"

The Ministry of Food Industry (Minpisheprom; Russian: Министерство пищевой промышленности СССР) was a government ministry in the Soviet Union.

== History ==
The People's Commissariat of Food Industry was established on 29 July 1934 by decree of the Central Executive Committee and the Council of People's Commissars USSR, which divided the People's Commissariat of Foreign and Internal Trade and the People's Commissariat of Internal Trade and the People's Commissariat of Food Industry. According to the Stalin Constitution of 1936 the People's Commissariat of Food Industry is a union-republic commissariat.

In January 1939, the People's Commissariat of Food Industry was subdivided by a ukase of the Presidium Supreme Soviet USSR, into the People's Commissariat of Fish Industry, the People's Commissariat of Meat and Dairy Industry, and the People's Commissariat of Food Industry USSR. The People's Commissariat of Food Industry was charged with supervision of the baking and confectionery industry, the sugar, alcohol, and liqueur industries, the fats and perfume and cosmetic industries, end all other enterprises not transferred to the People's Commissariat of Meat and Dairy Industry or to the People's Commissariat of Fish Industry. On 15 March 1946, the People's Commissariat of Food Industry USSR became the Ministry of Food Industry USSR.

The Ministry of Gustatory Industry USSR was organized by a ukase of 15 July 1946. Enterprises, sovkhozes, and organizations of the following industries were transferred to its jurisdiction from the Ministry of Food Industry USSR: alcoholic spirits, viniculture, liqueur-vodka, brewing, mineral water and non-alcoholic beverages, perfume and cosmetics, volatile oils, tea, tobacco and makhorka, and the sulfite—alcohol and hydrolysis industry. On 20 January 1949, the Ministry of Gustatory Industry USSR and the Ministry of Food Industry USSR were consolidated into the Ministry of Food Industry USSR.

The Ministry was abolished in November 1985 with the creation of the State Agro-Industrial Committee, which took over the functions of the Ministry for Agriculture, the Ministry for Fruit and Vegetable Production, the Ministry for the Meat and Dairy Industry, the Ministry of the Food Industry and the Ministry for Rural Construction.

== List of ministers ==
- Anastas Mikoyan (29 March 1934 - 12 August 1937)
- Aleksei Badajev (12 August 1937 - 19 January 1938)
- Avran Lazar Gilinski (19 January 1938 - 19 January 1939)
- Vasili Zotov (19 January 1939 - 7 May 1941)
- Dmitri Pavlov (7 May 1941 - 26 April 1951)
- Ivan Sivolap (26 April 1951 - 15 March 1953)
- Vasili Zotov (24 August 1953 - 10 May 1957; 15 October 1964 - 16 January 1970)
- Voldemar Lein (16 January 1970 - 22 November 1985)
