= Kosygin's Fourth Government =

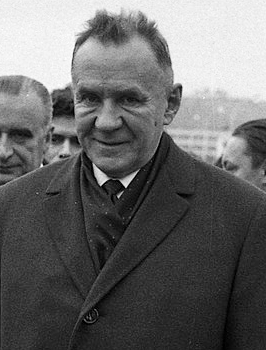
Alexei Kosygin in 1966

The former government of Alexei Kosygin was dissolved following the Soviet legislative election of 1974. Kosygin was once again elected premier by the Politburo and the Central Committee following the election. His fourth government lasted for nearly five years, until the 1979 Soviet election.

== Ministries ==
| Ministry | Minister | Period |
|---|---|---|
| Chairman of the Council of Ministers | Alexei Kosygin | 26 July 1974 – 16 April 1979 |
| First Deputy Chairman of the Council of Ministers | Kirill Mazurov | 26 July 1974 – 28 November 1978 |
| First Deputy Chairman of the Council of Ministers | Nikolai Tikhonov | 2 September 1976 – 16 April 1979 |
| Deputy Chairman of the Council of Ministers | Ivan Arkhipov | 26 July 1974 – 16 April 1979 |
| Deputy Chairman of the Council of Ministers | Nikolai Baibakov | 26 July 1974 – 16 April 1979 |
| Deputy Chairman of the Council of Ministers | Veniamin Dymshits | 26 July 1974 – 16 April 1979 |
| Deputy Chairman of the Council of Ministers | Mikhail Lesetshko | 26 July 1974 – 16 April 1979 |
| Deputy Chairman of the Council of Ministers | Vladimir Kirillin | 26 July 1974 – 16 April 1979 |
| Deputy Chairman of the Council of Ministers | Ignati Novikov | 26 July 1974 – 16 April 1979 |
| Deputy Chairman of the Council of Ministers | Vladimir Novikov | 26 July 1974 – 28 November 1978 |
| Deputy Chairman of the Council of Ministers | Tikhon Kiselyov | 5 December 1978 – 16 April 1979 |
| Deputy Chairman of the Council of Ministers | Ziya Nuriyev | 26 July 1974 – 16 April 1979 |
| Deputy Chairman of the Council of Ministers | Leonid Smirnov | 26 July 1974 – 16 April 1979 |
| Deputy Chairman of the Council of Ministers | Nikolai Tikhonov | 26 July 1974 – 2 September 1976 |
| Deputy Chairman of the Council of Ministers | Nikolai Martynov | 25 June 1976 – 16 April 1979 |
| Deputy Chairman of the Council of Ministers | Konstantin Katushev | 16 March 1977 – 16 April 1979 |
| Minister of Aviation Industry | Pyotr Dementev | 26 July 1974 – 14 May 1977 |
| Minister of Aviation Industry | Vasili Kazakov | 3 June 1977 – 16 April 1979 |
| Minister of Instrument-Making, Automation and Control System | Konstantin Rudnev | 26 July 1974 – 16 April 1979 |
| Minister of Automobile Industry | Aleksandr Tarasov | 26 July 1974 – 28 June 1975 |
| Minister of Automobile Industry | Viktor Poljakov | 17 July 1975 – 16 April 1979 |
| Minister of Chemical Industry | Leonid Kostandov | 26 July 1974 – 16 April 1979 |
| Minister of Construction of Petrochemical Machinery | Konstantin Brekhov | 26 July 1974 – 16 April 1979 |
| Minister of Civil Aviation | Boris Bugajev | 26 July 1974 – 16 April 1979 |
| Minister of Construction of Oil and Gas Industry | Boris Shcherbina | 26 July 1974 – 16 April 1979 |
| Minister of Defence Industry | Sergei Sverov | 26 July 1974 – 17 December 1970 |
| Minister of Defence Industry | Pavel Finogenov | 2 January – 16 April 1979 |
| Minister of Electrical Engineering | Aleksei Antonov | 26 July 1974 – 16 April 1979 |
| Minister of Electronic Industry | Aleksandr Shokin | 26 July 1974 – 16 April 1979 |
| Minister of Gas Industry | Sabit Orudzhev | 26 July 1974 – 16 April 1979 |
| Minister of Heavy and Transport Machines Construction | Vladimir Zhigalin | 26 July 1974 – 16 April 1979 |
| Minister of Machine Building | Vjatsheslav Yeljutin | 26 July 1974 – 16 April 1979 |
| Minister of Construction, Road Building and Communal Machines | Jefim Novosjelov | 26 July 1974 – 16 April 1979 |
| Minister of Machine Building for Light and Food Industries | Vasili Doyenin | 26 July 1974 – 23 February 1977 |
| Minister of Machine Building for Light and Food Industries | Ivan Pudkov | 28 March 1977 – 16 April 1979 |
| Minister of Machinery for Stock Raising and Feeding | Konstantin Beljak | 26 July 1974 – 16 April 1979 |
| Minister of General Machine Building | Sergei Afanasjev | 26 July 1974 – 16 April 1979 |
| Minister of Medium Machine Building | Yefim Slavski | 26 July 1974 – 16 April 1979 |
| Minister of Machine-Tool and Instrument Making | Anatoli Kostousov | 26 July 1974 – 16 April 1979 |
| Minister of Manufacture of Communication Media | Erien Pervyshin | 26 July 1974 – 16 April 1979 |
| Minister of Medical Industry | Pyotr Gusenko | 26 July 1974 – 28 January 1975 |
| Minister of Medical Industry | Afanasi Melnitshenko | 23 May 1975 – 16 April 1979 |
| Minister of Merchant Marine | Timofei Guzenko | 26 July 1974 – 16 April 1979 |
| Minister of Oil Industry | Valentin Shashin | 26 July 1974 – 22 March 1977 |
| Minister of Oil Industry | Nikolai Maltsev | 5 April 1977 – 16 April 1979 |
| Minister of Pulp and Paper Industry | Konstantin Galantshin | 26 July 1974 – 16 April 1979 |
| Minister of Radio Industry | Pyotr Pleshakov | 26 July 1974 – 16 April 1979 |
| Minister of Railways | Boris Beshchev | 26 July 1974 – 14 January 1977 |
| Minister of Railways | Ivan Pavlovski | 14 January 1977 – 16 April 1979 |
| Minister of Shipbuilding | Boris Butoma | 26 July 1974 – 19 July 1977 |
| Minister of Shipbuilding | Mikhail Yegorov | 19 July 1977 – 16 April 1979 |
| Minister of Tractors and Agricultural Machines | Ivan Sinizyn | 26 July 1974 – 16 April 1979 |
| Minister of Foreign Trade | Nikolai Patolitshev | 26 July 1974 – 16 April 1979 |
| Minister of Transport Construction | Yevgeni Kozhevnikov | 26 July 1974 – 5 March 1975 |
| Minister of Transport Construction | Ivan Sosnov | 5 March 1975 – 16 April 1979 |
| Minister of Agriculture | Dmitry Polyansky | 26 July 1974 – 6 March 1976 |
| Minister of Agriculture | Valentin Mesyats | 6 March 1976 – 16 April 1979 |
| Minister of Agricultural Production | Stepan Khitrov | 26 July 1974 – 16 April 1979 |
| Minister of Agricultural Products Procurement | Grigori Zolotukhin | 26 July 1974 – 16 April 1979 |
| Minister of Heavy and Transport Machines Construction | Fuad Jakubowski | 26 July 1974 – 27 March 1975 |
| Minister of Heavy and Transport Machines Construction | Boris Bakin | 22 May 1975 – 16 April 1979 |
| Minister of Construction, Road Building and Communal Machines | Jefim Novosjelov | 26 July 1974 – 16 April 1979 |
| Minister of Building Materials Industry | Ivan Grishmanov | 26 July 1974 – 4 January 1979 |
| Minister of Building Materials Industry | Aleksei Jasin | 24 January – 16 April 1979 |
| Minister of Coal Industry | Boris Bratshenko | 26 July 1974 – 16 April 1979 |
| Minister of Communications | Nikolai Psurtshev | 26 July 1974 – 4 September 1975 |
| Minister of Communications | Nikolai Talyshin | 4 September 1975 – 16 April 1979 |
| Minister of Construction | Georgi Karavajev | 26 July 1974 – 16 April 1979 |
| Minister of Construction of Heavy Industry | Nikolai Goldin | 26 July 1974 – 16 April 1979 |
| Minister of Culture | Yekaterina Furtseva | 26 July – 25 October 1974 |
| Minister of Culture | Pyotr Demichev | 14 November 1974 – 16 April 1979 |
| Minister of Defence | Andrei Gretchko | 26 July 1974 – 26 April 1976 |
| Minister of Defence | Dmitriy Ustinov | 29 April 1976 – 16 April 1979 |
| Minister of Education | Mikhail Prokofjev | 26 July 1974 – 16 April 1979 |
| Ministry of Finance | Vasily Garbuzov | 26 July 1974 – 16 April 1979 |
| Minister of Fish Industry | Aleksandr Ishkov | 26 July 1974 – 6 February 1978 |
| Minister of Fish Industry | Vladimir Kamentsev | 14 February – 16 April 1979 |
| Minister of Food Industry | Voldemar Lein | 26 July 1974 – 16 April 1979 |
| Minister of Foreign Affairs | Andrei Gromyko | 26 July 1974 – 16 April 1979 |
| Minister of Geology | Aleksandr Sidorenko | 26 July 1974 – 29 December 1975 |
| Minister of Geology | Jevgeni Kozlovski | 29 December 1975 – 26 July 1974 |
| Minister of Health | Boris Petrovski | 26 July 1974 – 16 April 1979 |
| Minister of Higher Education | Vjatsheslav Yeljutin | 26 July 1974 – 16 April 1979 |
| Minister of Industrial Construction | Aleksandr Tokarjev | 26 July 1974 – 16 April 1979 |
| Minister of Internal Affairs | Nikolai Shchelokov | 26 July 1974 – 16 April 1979 |
| Minister of Iron and Steel Industry | Ivan Kazanetz | 26 July 1974 – 16 April 1979 |
| Minister of Justice | Vladimir Terebilov | 26 July 1974 – 16 April 1979 |
| Minister of Land Reclamation and Water Conservancy | Yevgeni Aleksejevski | 26 July 1974 – 1 January 1979 |
| Minister of Land Reclamation and Water Conservancy | Nikolai Vasiljev | 13–16 April 1979 |
| Minister of Light Industry | Nikolai Tarasov | 26 July 1974 – 16 April 1979 |
| Minister of Meat and Dairy Industry | Sergei Antonov | 26 July 1974 – 16 April 1979 |
| Minister of Non-Ferrous Metallurgy | Pyotr Lomako | 26 July 1974 – 16 April 1979 |
| Minister of Oil Processing and Petrochemical Industry | Viktor Fjodorov | 26 July 1974 – 16 April 1979 |
| Minister of Electrical Power and Electrification | Pyotr Neporozhny | 26 July 1974 – 16 April 1979 |
| Minister of Timber and Wood Processing Industry | Nikolai Timofjejev | 26 July 1974 – 16 April 1979 |
| Minister of Trade, Home | Aleksandr Strujev | 26 July 1974 – 16 April 1979 |
| Minister of Construction of Power Plants | Viktor Krotov | 26 May 1975 – 16 April 1979 |

== Committees ==
| Committee | Chairman | Period |
|---|---|---|
| Chairman of the People's Control Commission | Aleksei Shkolnikov | 26 July 1974 – 16 April 1979 |
| Chairman of the State Planning Committee | Nikolai Baibakov | 26 July 1974 – 16 April 1979 |
| Chairman of State Committee for State Security (KGB) | Yuri Andropov | 26 July 1974 – 16 April 1979 |

Government offices
| Preceded by Kosygin III | Governments of the Soviet Union; 26 July 1974 – 16 April 1979 | Succeeded by Kosygin V |
