= Kosygin's Fifth Government =

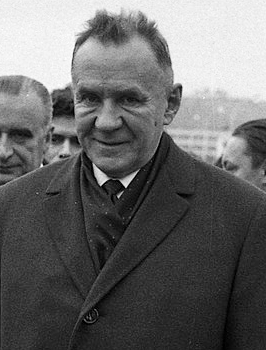

The former government of Alexei Kosygin was dissolved following the Soviet legislative election of 1979. Kosygin was once again elected Premier by the Politburo and the Central Committee following the election. His fourth government lasted a little over one year due to bad health which led him to resign.

== Ministries ==
Ministry	Minister	Period
Chairman of the Council of Ministers	Alexei Kosygin	19 April 1979 – 23 November 1980
First Deputy Chairman of the Council of Ministers	Nikolai Tikhonov	19 April 1979 – 23 November 1980
Deputy Chairman of the Council of Ministers	Ivan Arkhipov	19 April 1979 – 23 November 1980
Deputy Chairman of the Council of Ministers	Nikolai Baibakov	19 April 1979 – 23 November 1980
Deputy Chairman of the Council of Ministers	Veniamin Dymshits	19 April 1979 – 23 November 1980
Deputy Chairman of the Council of Ministers	Konstantin Katushev	19 April 1979 – 23 November 1980
Deputy Chairman of the Council of Ministers	Vladimir Kirillin	19 April 1979 – 22 January 1980
Deputy Chairman of the Council of Ministers	Juri Marchuk	22 January – 23 November 1980
Deputy Chairman of the Council of Ministers	Vladimir Novikov	19 April 1979 – 23 November 1980
Deputy Chairman of the Council of Ministers	Tikhon Kiselev	19 April 1979 – 23 November 1980
Deputy Chairman of the Council of Ministers	Mikhail Lesetshko	19 April 1979 – 23 November 1980
Deputy Chairman of the Council of Ministers	Nikolai Martynov	19 April 1979 – 23 November 1980
Deputy Chairman of the Council of Ministers	Ignati Novikov	19 April 1979 – 23 November 1980
Deputy Chairman of the Council of Ministers	Vladimir Novikov	19 April 1979 – 23 November 1980
Deputy Chairman of the Council of Ministers	Ziya Nuriyev	19 April 1979 – 23 November 1980
Deputy Chairman of the Council of Ministers	Leonid Smirnov	19 April 1979 – 23 November 1980
Minister of Agriculture Construction	Stepan Khitrov	19 April 1979 – 23 November 1980
Minister of Agricultural Products Procurement	Grigori Zolotukhin	19 April 1979 – 23 November 1980
Minister of Agriculture	Valentin Mesyats	19 April 1979 – 23 November 1980
Minister of Aviation Industry	Vasili Kazakov	19 April 1979 – 23 November 1980
Minister of Assembling and Special Construction	Boris Bakin	19 April 1979 – 23 November 1980
Minister of Automobile Industry	Viktor Poljakov	19 April 1979 – 23 November 1980
Minister of Building Material Industry	Aleksei Jasin	19 April 1979 – 23 November 1980
Minister of Chemical Industry	Leonid Kostandov	19 April 1979 – 23 November 1980
Minister of Civil Aviation	Boris Bugajev	19 April 1979 – 23 November 1980
Minister of Coal Industry	Boris Bratshenko	19 April 1979 – 23 November 1980
Minister of Communications	Nikolai Talyshin	19 April 1979 – 23 November 1980
Minister of Construction	Georgi Karavajev	19 April 1979 – 23 November 1980
Minister of Construction the Far East and Transbaikal Region	Sergei Bashilov	18 December 1979 – 23 November 1980
Ministry of Construction of Heavy Industry	Nikolai Goldin	19 April 1979 – 23 November 1980
Minister of Construction of Oil and Gas Industry	Boris Shcherbina	19 April 1979 – 23 November 1980
Minister of Construction of Petrochemical Machinery	Konstantin Brekhov	19 April 1979 – 23 November 1980
Minister of Construction of Power Plants	Viktor Krotov	19 April 1979 – 23 November 1980
Minister of Culture	Pyotr Demichev	19 April 1979 – 23 November 1980
Minister of Construction, Road Building and Communal Machines	Jefim Novosjelov	19 April 1979 – 23 November 1980
Minister of Defence	Dmitriy Ustinov	19 April 1979 – 23 November 1980
Minister of Defence Industry	Pavel Finogenov	19 April 1979 – 23 November 1980
Minister of Education	Mikhail Prokofjev	19 April 1979 – 23 November 1980
Minister of Electrical Engineering	Aleksei Antonov	19 April 1979 – 23 November 1980
Minister of Electrical Power and Electrification	Pyotr Neporozhny	19 April 1979 – 23 November 1980
Minister of Electronic Industry	Aleksandr Shokin	19 April 1979 – 23 November 1980
Minister of Finance	Vasily Garbuzov	19 April 1979 – 23 November 1980
Minister of Fish Industry	Vladimir Kamentsev	19 April 1979 – 23 November 1980
Minister of Food Industry	Voldemar Lein	19 April 1979 – 23 November 1980
Minister of Foreign Affairs	Andrei Gromyko	19 April 1979 – 23 November 1980
Minister of Foreign Trade	Nikolai Patolitshev	19 April 1979 – 23 November 1980
Minister of Gas Industry	Sabit Orudzhev	19 April 1979 – 23 November 1980
Minister of Geology	Jevgeni Kozlovski	19 April 1979 – 23 November 1980
Minister of Health	Boris Petrovski	19 April 1979 – 23 November 1980
Minister of Heavy and Transport Construction	Vladimir Zhigalin	19 April 1979 – 23 November 1980
Ministry of Higher Education	Vjatsheslav Yeljutin	19 April 1979 – 23 November 1980
Ministry of Industrial Construction	Aleksandr Tokarjev	19 April 1979 – 23 November 1980
Minister of Instrument-Making, Automation and Control Systems	Konstantin Rudnev	19 April 1979 – 1 July 1980
Minister of Instrument-Making, Automation and Control Systems	Mikhail Shkabardnya	10 September – 23 November 1980
Minister of Internal Affairs	Nikolai Shchelokov	19 April 1979 – 23 November 1980
Minister of Iron and Steel Industry	Ivan Kazanetz	19 April 1979 – 23 November 1980
Minister of Justice	Vladimir Terebilov	19 April 1979 – 23 November 1980
Minister of Land Reclamation and Water Conservancy	Nikolai Vasiljev	19 April 1979 – 23 November 1980
Minister of Light Industry	Nikolai Tarasov	19 April 1979 – 23 November 1980
Minister of Machine Building	Vjatsheslav Bakhirov	19 April 1979 – 23 November 1980
Minister of Construction, Road Building and Communal Machines	Jefim Novosjelov	19 April 1979 – 23 November 1980
Minister of Machine Building for Light and Food Industries	Ivan Pudkov	19 April 1979 – 23 November 1980
Minister of Machinery for Stock Raising and Feeding	Konstantin Beljak	19 April 1979 – 23 November 1980
Minister of General Machine Building	Sergei Afanasjev	19 April 1979 – 23 November 1980
Minister of Machine-Tool and Instrument Making	Anatoli Kostousov	19 April 1979 – 23 November 1980
Minister of Manufacture of Communication Media	Erien Pervyshin	19 April 1979 – 23 November 1980
Minister of Meat and Dairy Industry	Sergei Antonov	19 April 1979 – 23 November 1980
Minister of Medical Industry	Afanasi Melnitshenko	19 April 1979 – 23 November 1980
Minister of Medium Machine Building	Yefim Slavski	19 April 1979 – 23 November 1980
Minister of Merchant Marine	Timofei Guzenko	19 April 1979 – 23 November 1980
Minister of Non-Ferrous Metallurgy	Pyotr Lomako	19 April 1979 – 23 November 1980
Minister of Oil Industry	Nikolai Maltsev	19 April 1979 – 23 November 1980
Minister of Oil Processing and Petrochemical Industry	Viktor Fjodorov	19 April 1979 – 23 November 1980
Minister of Pulp and Paper Industry	Konstantin Galantshin	19 April 1979 – 23 November 1980
Minister of Radio Industry	Pyotr Pleshakov	19 April 1979 – 23 November 1980
Minister of Railways	Ivan Pavlovski	19 April 1979 – 23 November 1980
Minister of Shipbuilding	Mikhail Yegorov	19 April 1979 – 23 November 1980
Ministry of Timber and Wood Processing Industry	Nikolai Timofjejev	19 April 1979 – 23 November 1980
Minister of Tractors and Agricultural Machines	Ivan Sinizyn	19 April 1979 – 10 October 1980
Minister of Tractors and Agricultural Machines	Aleksandr Yezhevski	10 October – 23 November 1980
Minister of Trade, Home	Aleksandr Strujev	19 April 1979 – 23 November 1980
Minister of Transport Construction	Ivan Sosnov	19 April 1979 – 23 November 1980

== Committees ==
Committee	Chairman	Period
Chief Administrator of the Council of Ministers	Mikhail Smirtyukov	19 April 1979 – 23 November 1980
Chairman of the People's Control Commission	Aleksei Shkolnikov	19 April 1979 – 23 November 1980
Chairman of the State Planning Committee	Nikolai Baibakov	19 April 1979 – 23 November 1980
Chairman of State Committee for State Security (KGB)	Yuri Andropov	19 April 1979 – 23 November 1980

Government offices
Preceded by Kosygin IV	Governments of the Soviet Union; 19 April 1979 – 23 November 1980	Succeeded by Tikhonov I
