= Tikhonov's Second Government =

The former government of Nikolai Tikhonov was dissolved following the Soviet legislative election of 1984 which gave a clear majority in favour of the Communist Party of the Soviet Union. Tikhonov's government was dissolved in 1985 when Mikhail Gorbachev replaced him with Nikolai Ryzhkov as Premier.

== Ministries ==
Ministry	Minister	Period
Chairman of the Council of Ministers	Nikolai Tikhonov	11 April 1984 – 27 September 1985
First Deputy Chairman of the Council of Ministers	Heydar Aliyev	11 April 1984 – 27 September 1985
First Deputy Chairman of the Council of Ministers	Ivan Arkhipov	11 April 1984 – 27 September 1985
First Deputy Chairman of the Council of Ministers	Andrei Gromyko	11 April 1984 – 2 July 1985
Deputy Chairman of the Council of Ministers	Nikolai Baibakov	11 April 1984 – 27 September 1985
Deputy Chairman of the Council of Ministers	Veniamin Dymshits	11 April 1984 – 27 September 1985
Deputy Chairman of the Council of Ministers	Nikolai Talyzin	11 April 1984 – 27 September 1985
Deputy Chairman of the Council of Ministers	Leonid Kostandov	11 April 1984 – 5 September 1985
Deputy Chairman of the Council of Ministers	Yakov Ryabov	11 April 1984 – 27 September 1985
Deputy Chairman of the Council of Ministers	Juri Marchuk	11 April 1984 – 27 September 1985
Deputy Chairman of the Council of Ministers	Nikolai Martynov	11 April 1984 – 27 September 1985
Deputy Chairman of the Council of Ministers	Aleksei Antonov	11 April 1984 – 27 September 1985
Deputy Chairman of the Council of Ministers	Ziya Nuriyev	11 April 1984 – 27 September 1985
Deputy Chairman of the Council of Ministers	Leonid Smirnov	11 April 1984 – 27 September 1985
Deputy Chairman of the Council of Ministers	Ivan Bodyul	11 April 1984 – 27 September 1985
Deputy Chairman of the Council of Ministers	Boris Shcherbina	11 April 1984 – 27 September 1985
Minister of Agriculture Construction	Viktor Danilenko	11 April 1984 – 27 September 1985
Minister of Agricultural Products Procurement	Grigori Zolotukhin	11 April 1984 – 27 September 1985
Minister of Agriculture	Valentin Mesyats	11 April 1984 – 27 September 1985
Minister of Aviation Industry	Ivan Silayev	11 April 1984 – 27 September 1985
Minister of Assembling and Special Construction	Boris Bakin	11 April 1984 – 27 September 1985
Minister of Automobile Industry	Viktor Poljakov	11 April 1984 – 27 September 1985
Minister of Building Material Industry	Aleksei Jasin	11 April 1984 – 15 July 1985
Minister of Building Material Industry	Sergei Voyenushkin	15 July – 27 September 1985
Minister of Chemical Industry	Vladimir Listov	11 April 1984 – 27 September 1985
Minister of Civil Aviation	Boris Bugajev	11 April 1984 – 27 September 1985
Minister of Coal Industry	Boris Bratshenko	11 April 1984 – 27 September 1985
Minister of Communications	Vasily Shamshin	11 April 1984 – 27 September 1985
Minister of Construction	Georgi Karavajev	11 April 1984 – 27 September 1985
Minister of Construction the Far East and Transbaikal Region	Aleksandr Babenko	11 April 1984 – 27 September 1985
Ministry of Constructuction of Heavy Industry	Nikolai Goldin	11 April 1984 – 27 September 1985
Minister of Construction of Oil and Gas Industry	Boris Shcherbina	11 April 1984 – 27 September 1985
Minister of Construction of Petrochemical Machinery	Konstantin Brekhov	11 April 1984 – 27 September 1985
Minister of Construction of Power Plants	Vladimir Velichko	11 April 1984 – 27 September 1985
Minister of Construction, Road Building and Communal Machines	Vitali Chudin	11 April 1984 – 2 August 1985
Minister of Construction, Road Building and Communal Machines	Jevgeni Varnachev	2 August – 27 September 1985
Minister of Culture	Pyotr Demichev	11 April 1984 – 27 September 1985
Minister of Defence	Dmitriy Ustinov	11 April 1984 – 22 December 1984
Minister of Defence	Sergei Sokolov	22 December 1984 – 27 September 1985
Minister of Defence Industry	Pavel Finogenov	11 April 1984 – 27 September 1985
Minister of Education	Mikhail Prokofjev	11 April – 21 December 1984
Minister of Education	Sergei Shcherbakov	21 December 1984 – 27 September 1985
Minister of Electrical Engineering	Anatoli Mayorets	11 April 1984 – 8 May 1985
Minister of Electrical Engineering	Gennady Voronovski	8 May – 27 September 1985
Minister of Power and Electrification	Pyotr Neporozhny	11 April 1984 – 23 March 1985
Minister of Power and Electrification	Anatoli Mayorets	23 March – 27 September 1985
Minister of Electronic Industry	Aleksandr Shokin	11 April 1984 – 27 September 1985
Minister of Finance	Vasily Garbuzov	11 April 1984 – 27 September 1985
Minister of Fish Industry	Vladimir Kamentsev	11 April 1984 – 27 September 1985
Minister of Food Industry	Voldemar Lein	11 April 1984 – 27 September 1985
Minister of Fruits and Vegetables	Nikolai Koslov	11 April 1984 – 27 September 1985
Minister of Foreign Affairs	Andrei Gromyko	11 April 1984 – 7 July 1985
Minister of Foreign Affairs	Eduard Shevardnadze	7 July – 27 September 1985
Minister of Foreign Trade	Nikolai Patolitshev	11 April 1984 – 27 September 1985
Minister of Gas Industry	Sabit Orudzhev	11 April 1984 – 13 February 1985
Minister of Gas Industry	Viktor Tshernomyrdin	13 February – 27 September 1985
Minister of Geology	Jevgeni Kozlovski	11 April 1984 – 27 September 1985
Minister of Health	Sergei Burenkov	11 April 1984 – 27 September 1985
Minister of Heavy and Transport Construction	Sergei Afanasjev	11 April 1984 – 27 September 1985
Ministry of Higher Education	Vjatsheslav Yeljutin	11 April 1984 – 16 July 1985
Ministry of Higher Education	Gennady Yogadin	16 July – 27 September 1985
Ministry of Industrial Construction	Juri Solovjev	11 April 1984 – 16 July 1985
Ministry of Industrial Construction	Arkadi Shchepetilnikov	16 July – 27 September 1985
Minister of Instrument-Making, Automation and Control Systems	Mikhail Shkabardnya	11 April 1984 – 27 September 1985
Minister of Internal Affairs	Vitali Fedorchuk	11 April 1984 – 27 September 1985
Minister of Iron and Steel Industry	Ivan Kazanetz	11 April 1984 – 16 July 1985
Minister of Iron and Steel Industry	Serafim Kolpakov	16 July – 27 September 1985
Minister of Justice	Boris Kravtsov	11 April 1984 – 27 September 1985
Minister of Land Reclamation and Water Conservancy	Nikolai Vasiljev	11 April 1984 – 27 September 1985
Minister of Light Industry	Nikolai Tarasov	11 April 1984 – 6 July 1985
Minister of Light Industry	Vladimir Klyuyev	6 July – 27 September 1985
Minister of Machine Building	Vjatsheslav Bakhirov	11 April 1984 – 27 September 1985
Minister of Machine Building for Light and Food Industries	Ivan Pudkov	11 April 1984 – 19 May 1984
Minister of Machine Building for Light and Food Industries	Lev Vasiljev	19 May 1984 – 27 September 1985
Minister of Machinery for Stock Raising and Feeding	Konstantin Beljak	11 April 1984 – 27 September 1985
Minister of General Machine Building	Oleg Baklamov	11 April 1984 – 27 September 1985
Minister of Manufacture of Communication Media	Erien Pervyshin	11 April 1984 – 27 September 1985
Minister of Meat and Dairy Industry	Jevgeni Sizenko	11 April 1984 – 27 September 1985
Minister of Medical Industry	Afanasi Melnitshenko	11 April 1984 – 27 September 1985
Minister of Medium Machine Building	Yefim Slavski	11 April 1984 – 27 September 1985
Minister of Merchant Marine	Timofei Guzenko	11 April 1984 – 27 September 1985
Minister of Mineral Fertilizer Production	Aleksei Petrishchev	11 April 1984 – 27 September 1985
Minister of Non-Ferrous Metallurgy	Pyotr Lomako	11 April 1984 – 27 September 1985
Minister of Oil Industry	Nikolai Maltsev	11 April 1984 – 13 February 1985
Minister of Oil Industry	Vasili Dinkov	13 February – 27 September 1985
Minister of Oil Processing and Petrochemical Industry	Viktor Fjodorov	11 April 1984 – 27 September 1985
Minister of Radio Industry	Pyotr Pleshakov	11 April 1984 – 27 September 1985
Minister of Railways	Nikolai Konarjev	11 April 1984 – 27 September 1985
Minister of Shipbuilding	Igor Belousov	11 April 1984 – 27 September 1985
Ministry of Timber and Wood Processing Industry	Mikhail Busygin	11 April 1984 – 27 September 1985
Minister of Tractors and Agricultural Machines	Aleksandr Yezhevski	11 April 1984 – 27 September 1985
Minister of Trade, Home	Grigori Vashchenko	11 April 1984 – 27 September 1985
Minister of Transport Construction	Ivan Sosnov	11 April 1984 – 8 May 1985
Minister of Transport Construction	Vladimir Arkadyevich Brezhnev	8 May – 27 September 1985

== Committees ==
Committee	Chairman	Period
Chief Administrator of the Council of Ministers	Mikhail Smirtyukov	11 April 1984 – 27 September 1985
Chairman of the People's Control Commission	Aleksei Shkolnikov	11 April 1984 – 27 September 1985
Chairman of the State Planning Committee	Nikolai Baibakov	11 April 1984 – 27 September 1985
Chairman of State Committee for State Security (KGB)	Viktor Chebrikov	11 April 1984 – 27 September 1985

Government offices
Preceded by Tikhonov I	Governments of the Soviet Union; 11 April 1984 – 27 September 1985	Succeeded by Ryzhkov I
