= Tikhonov's First Government =

The government of the Soviet Union under Alexei Kosygin was dissolved following Kosygin's resignation in October 1980, with Nikolai Tikhonov taking over the office of Premier. This government was dissolved following the nationwide 1984 legislative election.

== Ministries ==
Ministry	Minister	Period
Chairman of the Council of Ministers	Nikolai Tikhonov	23 October 1980 – 11 April 1984
First Deputy Chairman of the Council of Ministers	Heydar Aliyev	24 November 1982 – 11 April 1984
First Deputy Chairman of the Council of Ministers	Ivan Arkhipov	27 October 1980 – 11 April 1984
First Deputy Chairman of the Council of Ministers	Andrei Gromyko	24 March 1983 – 11 April 1984
Deputy Chairman of the Council of Ministers	Nikolai Baibakov	23 October 1980 – 11 April 1984
Deputy Chairman of the Council of Ministers	Veniamin Dymshits	23 October 1980 – 11 April 1984
Deputy Chairman of the Council of Ministers	Konstantin Katushev	23 October 1980 – 30 July 1982
Deputy Chairman of the Council of Ministers	Nikolai Talyzin	23 October 1980 – 11 April 1984
Deputy Chairman of the Council of Ministers	Leonid Kostandov	5 November 1980 – 11 April 1984
Deputy Chairman of the Council of Ministers	Juri Marchuk	23 October 1980 – 11 April 1984
Deputy Chairman of the Council of Ministers	Valentin Makejev	23 October 1980 – 20 January 1983
Deputy Chairman of the Council of Ministers	Nikolai Martynov	23 October 1980 – 11 April 1984
Deputy Chairman of the Council of Ministers	Ignati Novikov	23 October 1980 – 20 July 1983
Deputy Chairman of the Council of Ministers	Aleksei Antonov	20 December 1980 – 11 April 1984
Deputy Chairman of the Council of Ministers	Ziya Nuriyev	23 October 1980 – 11 April 1984
Deputy Chairman of the Council of Ministers	Leonid Smirnov	23 October 1980 – 11 April 1984
Deputy Chairman of the Council of Ministers	Ivan Bodyul	19 December 1980 – 11 April 1984
Deputy Chairman of the Council of Ministers	Boris Shcherbina	22 February – 11 April 1984
Minister of Agriculture Construction	Stepan Khitrov	23 October 1980 – 8 December 1982
Minister of Agriculture Construction	Viktor Danilenko	8 December 1982 – 11 April 1984
Minister of Agricultural Products Procurement	Grigori Zolotukhin	23 October 1980 – 11 April 1984
Minister of Agriculture	Valentin Mesyats	23 October 1980 – 11 April 1984
Minister of Aviation Industry	Vasili Kazakov	23 October 1980 – 17 February 1981
Minister of Aviation Industry	Ivan Silayev	21 February 1981 – 11 April 1984
Minister of Assembling and Special Construction	Boris Bakin	23 October 1980 – 11 April 1984
Minister of Automobile Industry	Viktor Poljakov	23 October 1980 – 11 April 1984
Minister of Building Material Industry	Aleksei Jasin	23 October 1980 – 11 April 1984
Minister of Chemical Industry	Leonid Kostandov	23 October – 6 November 1980
Minister of Chemical Industry	Vladimir Listov	6 November 1980 – 11 April 1984
Minister of Civil Aviation	Boris Bugajev	23 October 1980 – 11 April 1984
Minister of Coal Industry	Boris Bratshenko	23 October 1980 – 11 April 1984
Minister of Communications	Nikolai Talyshin	23 October 1980 – 11 April 1984
Minister of Construction	Georgi Karavajev	23 October 1980 – 11 April 1984
Minister of Construction the Far East and Transbaikal Region	Sergei Bashilov	23 October 1980 – 10 September 1983
Minister of Construction the Far East and Transbaikal Region	Aleksandr Babenko	10 September 1983 – 11 April 1984
Ministry of Constructuction of Heavy Industry	Nikolai Goldin	19 April 1979 – 11 April 1984
Minister of Construction of Oil and Gas Industry	Boris Shcherbina	23 October 1980 – 22 February 1984
Minister of Construction of Oil and Gas Industry	Vladimir Chirskov	22 February – 11 April 1984
Minister of Construction of Petrochemical Machinery	Konstantin Brekhov	23 October 1980 – 11 April 1984
Minister of Construction of Power Plants	Viktor Krotov	23 October 1980 – 11 December 1983
Minister of Construction of Power Plants	Vladimir Velichko	11 December 1983 – 11 April 1984
Minister of Construction, Road Building and Communal Machines	Jefim Novosjelov	23 October – 2 December 1980
Minister of Construction, Road Building and Communal Machines	Vitali Chudin	2 December 1980 – 11 April 1984
Minister of Culture	Pyotr Demichev	23 October 1980 – 11 April 1984
Minister of Defence	Dmitriy Ustinov	23 October 1980 – 11 April 1984
Minister of Defence Industry	Pavel Finogenov	23 October 1980 – 11 April 1984
Minister of Education	Mikhail Prokofjev	23 October 1980 – 11 April 1984
Minister of Electrical Engineering	Aleksei Antonov	23 October – 20 December 1980
Minister of Electrical Engineering	Anatoli Mayorets	20 December 1980 – 11 April 1984
Minister of Electrical Power and Electrification	Pyotr Neporozhny	23 October 1980 – 11 April 1984
Minister of Electronic Industry	Aleksandr Shokin	23 October 1980 – 11 April 1984
Minister of Finance	Vasily Garbuzov	23 October 1980 – 11 April 1984
Minister of Fish Industry	Vladimir Kamentsev	23 October 1980 – 11 April 1984
Minister of Food Industry	Voldemar Lein	23 October 1980 – 11 April 1984
Minister of Fruits and Vegetables	Nikolai Koslov	19 December 1980 – 11 April 1984
Minister of Foreign Affairs	Andrei Gromyko	23 October 1980 – 11 April 1984
Minister of Foreign Trade	Nikolai Patolitshev	23 October 1980 – 11 April 1984
Minister of Gas Industry	Sabit Orudzhev	23 October 1980 – 10 May 1981
Minister of Gas Industry	Vasili Dinkov	10 May 1981 – 11 April 1984
Minister of Geology	Jevgeni Kozlovski	23 October 1980 – 11 April 1984
Minister of Health	Boris Petrovski	23 October – 22 December 1980
Minister of Health	Sergei Burenkov	22 December 1980 – 11 April 1984
Minister of Heavy and Transport Construction	Vladimir Zhigalin	23 October 1980 – 4 April 1983
Minister of Heavy and Transport Construction	Sergei Afanasjev	4 April 1983 – 11 April 1984
Ministry of Higher Education	Vjatsheslav Yeljutin	23 October 1980 – 11 April 1984
Ministry of Industrial Construction	Aleksandr Tokarjev	23 October 1980 – 3 March 1984
Ministry of Industrial Construction	Juri Solovjev	3 March – 11 April 1984
Minister of Instrument-Making, Automation and Control Systems	Mikhail Shkabardnya	23 October 1980 – 11 April 1984
Minister of Internal Affairs	Nikolai Shchelokov	23 October 1980 – 17 December 1982
Minister of Internal Affairs	Vitali Fedorchuk	17 December 1982 – 11 April 1984
Minister of Iron and Steel Industry	Ivan Kazanetz	23 October 1980 – 11 April 1984
Minister of Justice	Vladimir Terebilov	23 October 1980 – 11 April 1984
Minister of Land Reclamation and Water Conservancy	Nikolai Vasiljev	23 October 1980 – 11 April 1984
Minister of Light Industry	Nikolai Tarasov	23 October 1980 – 11 April 1984
Minister of Machine Building	Vjatsheslav Bakhirov	23 October 1980 – 11 April 1984
Minister of Machine Building for Light and Food Industries	Ivan Pudkov	23 October 1980 – 11 April 1984
Minister of Machinery for Stock Raising and Feeding	Konstantin Beljak	23 October 1980 – 11 April 1984
Minister of General Machine Building	Sergei Afanasjev	23 October 1980 – 4 April 1983
Minister of General Machine Building	Oleg Baklamov	4 April 1983 – 11 April 1984
Minister of Machine-Tool and Instrument Making	Anatoli Kostousov	23 October – 1 December 1980
Minister of Machine-Tool and Instrument Making	Ivan Silayev	1 December 1980 – 21 February 1981
Minister of Machine-Tool and Instrument Making	Boris Balmont	21 February 1981 – 11 April 1984
Minister of Manufacture of Communication Media	Erien Pervyshin	23 October 1980 – 11 April 1984
Minister of Meat and Dairy Industry	Sergei Antonov	23 October 1980 – 12 January 1984
Minister of Meat and Dairy Industry	Jevgeni Sizenko	12 January – 11 April 1984
Minister of Medical Industry	Afanasi Melnitshenko	23 October 1980 – 11 April 1984
Minister of Medium Machine Building	Yefim Slavski	23 October 1980 – 11 April 1984
Minister of Merchant Marine	Timofei Guzenko	23 October 1980 – 11 April 1984
Minister of Mineral Fertilizer Production	Aleksei Petrishchev	6 November 1980 – 11 April 1984
Minister of Non-Ferrous Metallurgy	Pyotr Lomako	23 October 1980 – 11 April 1984
Minister of Oil Industry	Nikolai Maltsev	23 October 1980 – 11 April 1984
Minister of Oil Processing and Petrochemical Industry	Viktor Fjodorov	23 October 1980 – 11 April 1984
Minister of Pulp and Paper Industry	Konstantin Galantshin	23 October 1980 – 11 April 1984
Minister of Radio Industry	Pyotr Pleshakov	23 October 1980 – 11 April 1984
Minister of Railways	Ivan Pavlovski	23 October 1980 – 29 November 1982
Minister of Railways	Nikolai Konarjev	1 December – 11 April 1984
Minister of Shipbuilding	Mikhail Yegorov	23 October 1980 – 10 January 1984
Minister of Shipbuilding	Igor Belousov	10 January – 11 April 1984
Ministry of Timber and Wood Processing Industry	Nikolai Timofjejev	23 October 1980 – 1 April 1982
Ministry of Timber and Wood Processing Industry	Mikhail Busygin	1 April – 11 April 1984
Minister of Tractors and Agricultural Machines	Aleksandr Yezhevski	23 October 1980 – 11 April 1984
Minister of Trade, Home	Aleksandr Strujev	23 October 1980 – 20 January 1983
Minister of Trade, Home	Grigori Vashchenko	20 January 1983 – 11 April 1984
Minister of Transport Construction	Ivan Sosnov	23 October 1980 – 11 April 1984

== Committees ==
Committee	Chairman	Period
Chief Administrator of the Council of Ministers	Mikhail Smirtyukov	23 October 1980 – 11 April 1984
Chairman of the People's Control Commission	Aleksei Shkolnikov	23 October 1980 – 11 April 1984
Chairman of the State Planning Committee	Nikolai Baibakov	23 October 1980 – 11 April 1984
Chairman of State Committee for State Security (KGB)	Yuri Andropov	23 October 1980 – 26 May 1982
Chairman of State Committee for State Security (KGB)	Vitali Fedorchuk	26 May – 17 December 1982
Chairman of State Committee for State Security (KGB)	Viktor Chebrikov	17 December 1982 – 11 April 1984

Government offices
Preceded by Kosygin V	Government of the Soviet Union; 23 October 1980 – 11 April 1984	Succeeded by Tikhonov II
