= Kosygin's Third Government =

Kosygin Third Government
- 21st Cabinet of the Soviet Union

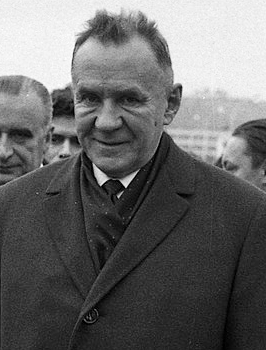
- Date formed: 14 June 1970
- Date dissolved: 26 July 1974

People and organisations
- Head of state: Nikolai Podgorny 1965-1977 Leonid Brezhnev 1977-1982
- Head of government: Alexei Kosygin
- Deputy head of government: Kirill Mazurov Dmitry Polyansky
- Member party: CPSU
- Status in legislature: One Party State

History
- Legislature term: 8th Convocation of the Supreme Soviet
- Predecessor: Kosygin's Second Government
- Successor: Kosygin's Fourth Government

The former government of Alexei Kosygin was dissolved following the Soviet legislative election of 1970. Kosygin was once again elected Premier by the Politburo and the Central Committee following the election. His third government would last for four years, until the 1974 Soviet election.

== Ministries ==
Ministry	Minister	Period
Chairman of the Council of Ministers	Alexei Kosygin	14 July, 1970 – 26 July 1974
First Deputy Chairman of the Council of Ministers	Dmitry Polyansky	14 July, 1970 – 2 February 1973
First Deputy Chairman of the Council of Ministers	Kirill Mazurov	14 July 1970 – 26 July 1974
Deputy Chairman of the Council of Ministers	Ignati Novikov	14 July 1970 – 26 July 1974
Deputy Chairman of the Council of Ministers	Veniamin Dymshits	14 July 1970 – 26 July 1974
Deputy Chairman of the Council of Ministers	Mikhail Lesetshko	14 July 1970 – 26 July 1974
Deputy Chairman of the Council of Ministers	Leonid Smirnov	14 July 1970 – 26 July 1974
Deputy Chairman of the Council of Ministers	Nikolai Baibakov	14 July 1970 – 26 July 1974
Deputy Chairman of the Council of Ministers	Vladimir Kirillin	14 July 1970 – 26 July 1974
Deputy Chairman of the Council of Ministers	Nikolai Tikhonov	14 July 1970 – 26 July 1974
Deputy Chairman of the Council of Ministers	Mikhail Yefremov	14 July 1970 – 1 January 1971
Deputy Chairman of the Council of Ministers	Pyotr Shelest	19 May 1972 – 7 May 1973
Deputy Chairman of the Council of Ministers	Ziya Nuriyev	3 April 1973 – 1 January 1971
Deputy Chairman of the Council of Ministers	Ivan Arkhipov	14 March 1973 – 26 July 1974
Minister of Foreign Trade	Nikolai Patolitshev	14 July 1970 – 26 July 1974
Minister of Railways	Boris Beshchev	14 July 1970 – 26 July 1974
Minister of Merchant Marine	Timofei Guzenko	14 July 1970 – 26 July 1974
Minister of Medium Machine Building	Yefim Slavski	14 July 1970 – 26 July 1974
Minister of Transport Construction	Yevgeni Kozhevnikov	14 July 1970 – 26 July 1974
Minister of Aviation Industry	Pyotr Dementev	14 July 1970 – 26 July 1974
Minister of Shipbuilding	Boris Butoma	14 July 1970 – 26 July 1974
Minister of Radio Industry	Valeri Kalmykov	14 July 1970 – 8 April 1974
Minister of Radio Industry	Pyotr Pleshakov	8 April – 26 July 1974
Minister of Foreign Affairs	Andrei Gromyko	14 July 1970 – 26 July 1974
Minister of Internal Affairs	Nikolai Shchelokov	14 July 1970 – 26 July 1974
Minister of Culture	Yekaterina Furtseva	14 July 1970 – 26 July 1974
Minister of Education	Mikhail Prokofjev	14 July 1970 – 26 July 1974
Minister of Higher Education	Vjatsheslav Yeljutin	14 July 1970 – 26 July 1974
Minister of Finance	Vasily Garbuzov	14 July 1970 – 26 July 1974
Minister of Commerce	Aleksandr Strujev	14 July 1970 – 26 July 1974
Minister of Defence	Andrei Grechko	14 July 1970 – 26 July 1974
Minister of Communications	Nikolai Psurtshev	14 July 1970 – 26 July 1974
Minister of Health	Boris Petrovski	14 July 1970 – 26 July 1974
Minister of Agriculture	Vladimir Matskevich	14 July 1970 – 2 February 1973
Minister of Agriculture	Dmitry Polyansky	2 February 1973 – 26 July 1974
Minister of Geology	Aleksandr Sidorenko	14 July 1970 – 26 July 1974
Minister of Energy and Electrification	Pyotr Neporozhny	14 July 1970 – 26 July 1974
Minister of Civil Aviation	Yevgeni Loginov	14 July 1970 – 26 July 1974
Minister of Civil Aviation	Boris Bugajev	14 July 1970 – 26 July 1974
Minister of Ferrous Metallurgy	Ivan Kazanetz	14 July 1970 – 26 July 1974
Minister of Coal Industry	Boris Bratshenko	14 July 1970 – 26 July 1974
Minister of Chemical Industry	Leonid Kostandov	14 July 1970 – 26 July 1974
Minister of Oil Industry	Valentin Shashin	14 July 1970 – 26 July 1974
Minister of Oil and Petrochemical Industry	Viktor Fjodorov	14 July 1970 – 26 July 1974
Minister of Timber and Wood Processing Industry	Nikolai Timofjejev	14 July 1970 – 26 July 1974
Minister of Building Materials Industry	Ivan Grishmanov	14 July 1970 – 26 July 1974
Minister of Light Industry		14 July 1970 – 26 July 1974
Minister of Food Industry	Voldemar Lein	14 July 1970 – 26 July 1974
Minister of Fish Industry	Aleksandr Ishkov	14 July 1970 – 26 July 1974
Minister of Meat and Dairy Industry	Sergei Antonov	14 July 1970 – 26 July 1974
Minister of Heavy and Transport Machines Construction	Vladimir Zhigalin	14 July 1970 – 26 July 1974
Minister of Construction of Tool-Machines	Anatoli Kostousov	14 July 1970 – 26 July 1974
Minister of Construction, Road Building and Communal Machines	Jefim Novosjelov	14 July 1970 – 26 July 1974
Minister of Tractors and Agricultural Machines	Ivan Sinizyn	14 July 1970 – 26 July 1974
Minister of Automobile Industry	Aleksandr Tarasov	14 July 1970 – 26 July 1974
Minister of Construction of Petrochemical Machinery	Konstantin Brekhov	14 July 1970 – 26 July 1974
Minister of Electrical Engineering	Aleksei Antonov	14 July 1970 – 26 July 1974
Minister of Instrument-Making, Automation and Control Systems	Konstantin Rudnev	14 July 1970 – 26 July 1974
Minister of Machine Building for Light and Food Industries	Vasili Doyenin	14 July 1970 – 26 July 1974
Minister of Assembling and Special Construction	Fuad Jakubowski	14 July 1970 – 26 July 1974
Minister of Land Reclamation and Water Conservancy	Yevgeni Aleksejevski	14 July 1970 – 26 July 1974
Minister of Gas Industry	Aleksei Kortunov	14 July 1970 – 20 September 1972
Minister of Gas Industry	Sabit Orudzhev	20 September 1972 – 26 July 1974
Minister of Construction of Oil and Gas Industry	Aleksei Kortunov	14 July 1970 – 11 December 1973
Minister of Construction of Oil and Gas Industry	Sabit Orudzhev	11 December 1973 – 26 July 1974
Minister of General Machine Building	Sergei Afanasjev	14 July 1970 – 26 July 1974
Minister of Non-Ferrous Metallurgy	Pyotr Lomako	14 July 1970 – 26 July 1974
Minister of Electronic Industry	Aleksandr Shokin	14 July 1970 – 26 July 1974
Minister of Defence Industry	Sergei Sverov	14 July 1970 – 26 July 1974
Minister of Housing and Architecture	Mikhail Pozokhin	14 July 1970 – 26 July 1974
Minister of Construction of Heavy Industry	Nikolai Goldin	14 July 1970 – 26 July 1974
Minister of Industrial Construction	Aleksandr Tokarjev	14 July 1970 – 26 July 1974
Minister of Agricultural Construction	Stepan Khitrov	14 July 1970 – 26 July 1974
Minister of Construction	Georgi Karavajev	14 July 1970 – 26 July 1974
Minister of Medical Industry	Pyotr Gusenko	14 July 1970 – 26 July 1974
Minister of Machine Building	Vjatsheslav Bakhirov	14 July 1970 – 26 July 1974
Minister of Cellulose and Paper Industry	Konstantin Galantshin	14 July 1970 – 26 July 1974
Minister of Machinery for Stock Raising and Feeding	Konstantin Beljak	11 October 1973– 26 July 1974
Minister of Production of Communication Media	Erien Pervyshin	11 April – 26 July 1974

== Committees ==
Committee	Chairman	Period
Chairman of the People's Control Commission	Pavel Kovanov	14 July 1970 – 23 July 1971
Chairman of the People's Control Commission	Gennady Voronov	23 July 1971 – 26 July 1974
Chairman of the State Planning Committee	Nikolai Baibakov	14 July 1970 – 7 May 1973
Chairman of State Committee for State Security (KGB)	Yuri Andropov	14 July 1970 – 26 July 1974

Government offices
Preceded by Kosygin II	Governments of the Soviet Union; 14 July 1970 – 26 July 1974	Succeeded by Kosygin IV
