= Kosygin's First Government =

Government of the Soviet Union

- 19th Government of the Soviet Union

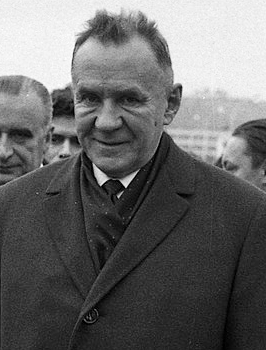
- Date formed: 15 October 1964
- Date dissolved: 3 August 1966

People and organisations
- Head of state: Anastas Mikoyan Nikolai Podgorny
- Head of government: Alexei Kosygin
- Deputy head of government: Dimitry Ustinov Kirill Mazurov Dmitry Polyansky
- Member party: CPSU
- Status in legislature: One Party State

History
- Election: 1962 legislative election
- Outgoing election: 1966 legislative election
- Legislature term: 6th Convocation of the Supreme Soviet
- Predecessor: Khrushchev's Second Government
- Successor: Kosygin's Second Government

The former government of Nikita Khrushchev was dissolved following his removal from the post of the Chairman of the Council of Ministers. Alexei Kosygin was elected Premier by the Politburo and the Central Committee following the removal of Khrushchev. His first government would last for two years, until the 1966 Soviet election held in June. Kosygin's first government saw the re-creation of many ministries that were removed under Khrushchev's previous government.

== Ministries ==
| Ministry | Minister | Period |
|---|---|---|
| Chairman of the Council of Ministers | Alexei Kosygin | 15 October 1964 – 3 August 1966 |
| First Deputy Chairman of the Council of Ministers | Dmitriy Ustinov | 15 October 1964 – 27 March 1965 |
| First Deputy Chairman of the Council of Ministers | Kirill Mazurov | 26 March 1965 – 3 August 1966 |
| First Deputy Chairman of the Council of Ministers | Dmitry Polyansky | 27 March 1965 – 3 August 1966 |
| Deputy Chairman of the Council of Ministers | Konstantin Rudnev | 27 March 1964 – 10 April 1965 |
| Deputy Chairman of the Council of Ministers | Aleksandr Shelepin | 27 March 1964 – 9 December 1965 |
| Deputy Chairman of the Council of Ministers | Ignaty Novikov | 27 March 1964 – 3 August 1966 |
| Deputy Chairman of the Council of Ministers | Veniamin Dymshits | 27 March 1964 – 3 August 1966 |
| Deputy Chairman of the Council of Ministers | Mikhail Lesechko | 27 March 1964 – 3 August 1966 |
| Deputy Chairman of the Council of Ministers | Leonid Smirnov | 27 March 1964 – 3 August 1966 |
| Deputy Chairman of the Council of Ministers | Vladimir Novikov | 27 March 1964 – 13 November 1965 |
| Deputy Chairman of the Council of Ministers | Mikhail Yefremov | 13 November 1965 – 3 August 1966 |
| Deputy Chairman of the Council of Ministers | Nikolai Baibakov | 27 March 1964 – 3 August 1966 |
| Deputy Chairman of the Council of Ministers | Vladimir Kirillin | 2 October 1965 – 3 August 1966 |
| Deputy Chairman of the Council of Ministers | Nikolai Tikhonov | 2 October 1965 – 3 August 1966 |
| Minister of Foreign Trade | Nikolai Patolichev | 15 October 1964 – 3 August 1966 |
| Minister of Railways | Boris Beshchev | 15 October 1964 – 3 August 1966 |
| Minister of Merchant Marine | Viktor Bakayev | 15 October 1964 – 3 August 1966 |
| Minister of Medium Machine Building | Yefim Slavski | 2 March 1965 – 3 August 1966 |
| Minister of Transport Construction | Yevgeny Kozhevnikov | 2 October 1965 – 3 August 1966 |
| Minister of Aviation Industry | Pyotr Dementyev | 2 October 1965 – 3 August 1966 |
| Minister of Shipbuilding | Boris Butoma | 2 March 1965 – 3 August 1966 |
| Minister of Radio Industry | Valery Kalmykov | 2 March 1965 – 3 August 1966 |
| Minister of Foreign Affairs | Andrei Gromyko | 15 October 1964 – 3 August 1966 |
| Minister of Culture | Yekaterina Furtseva | 15 October 1964 – 3 August 1966 |
| Minister of Higher Education | Vyacheslav Yelyutin | 15 October 1964 – 3 August 1966 |
| Minister of Finance | Vasily Garbuzov | 15 October 1964 – 3 August 1966 |
| Minister of Commerce | Alexander Struyev | 2 October 1965 – 3 August 1966 |
| Minister of Defence | Rodion Malinovsky | 2 October 1965 – 3 August 1966 |
| Minister of Communications | Nikolai Psurtsev | 2 October 1965 – 3 August 1966 |
| Minister of Health | Sergei Kurashov | 2 October 1965 – 23 August 1965 |
| Minister of Health | Boris Petrovsky | 8 September 1965 – 3 August 1966 |
| Minister of Agriculture | Ivan Volovchenko | 15 October 1964 – 18 February 1965 |
| Minister of Agriculture | Vladimir Matskevich | 18 February 1965 – 3 August 1966 |
| Minister of Geology | Aleksandr Sidorenko | 2 October 1965 – 3 August 1966 |
| Minister of Energy and Electrification | Pyotr Neporozhny | 15 October 1964 – 3 August 1966 |
| Minister of Civil Aviation | Yevgeny Loginov | 15 October 1964 – 3 August 1966 |
| Minister of Ferrous Metallurgy | Ivan Kazanets | 2 October 1965 – 3 August 1966 |
| Minister of Coal Industry | Boris Bratchenko | 2 October 1965 – 3 August 1966 |
| Minister of Chemical Industry | Leonid Kostandov | 2 October 1965 – 3 August 1966 |
| Minister of Oil Industry | Valentin Shashin | 2 October 1965 – 3 August 1966 |
| Minister of Oil and Petrochemical Industry | Viktor Fyodorov | 2 October 1965 – 3 August 1966 |
| Minister of Timber and Wood Processing Industry | Nikolai Timofeyev | 2 October 1965 – 3 August 1966 |
| Minister of Building Materials Industry | Ivan Grishmanov | 2 October 1965 – 3 August 1966 |
| Minister of Light Industry | Nikolai Tarasov | 2 October 1965 – 3 August 1966 |
| Minister of Food Industry | Vasily Zotov | 15 October 1964 – 3 August 1966 |
| Minister of Fish Industry | Alexander Ishkov | 2 October 1965 – 3 August 1966 |
| Minister of Meat and Dairy Industry | Sergei Antonov | 2 October 1965 – 3 August 1966 |
| Minister of Heavy and Transport Machines Construction | Vladimir Zhigalin | 2 October 1965 – 3 August 1966 |
| Minister of Construction of Tool-Machines | Anatoli Kostousov | 2 October 1965 – 3 August 1966 |
| Minister of Construction, Road Building and Communal Machines | Yefim Novosyolov | 2 October 1965 – 3 August 1966 |
| Minister of Tractors and Agricultural Machines | Ivan Sinitsyn | 2 October 1965 – 3 August 1966 |
| Minister of Automobile Industry | Aleksandr Tarasov | 2 October 1965 – 3 August 1966 |
| Minister of Construction of Petrochemical Machinery | Konstantin Brekhov | 2 October 1965 – 3 August 1966 |
| Minister of Electrical Engineering | Aleksei Antonov | 2 October 1965 – 3 August 1966 |
| Minister of Instrument-Making, Automation and Control Systems | Konstantin Rudnev | 2 October 1965 – 3 August 1966 |
| Minister of Machine Building for Light and Food Industries | Vasili Doyenin | 1 October 1965 – 3 August 1966 |
| Minister of Assembling and Special Construction | Fuad Yakubovsky | 2 October 1965 – 3 August 1966 |
| Minister of Land Reclamation and Water Conservancy | Yevgeny Alekseyevsky | 2 October 1965 – 3 August 1966 |
| Minister of Gas Industry | Aleksei Kortunov | 2 October 1965 – 3 August 1966 |
| Minister of General Machine Building | Sergei Afanasyev | 2 October 1965 – 3 August 1966 |
| Minister of Non-Ferrous Metallurgy | Pyotr Lomako | 2 October 1965 – 3 August 1966 |
| Minister of Electronic Industry | Aleksandr Shokin | 2 October 1965 – 3 August 1966 |
| Minister of Defence Industry | Sergei Sverov | 2 October 1965 – 3 August 1966 |
| Minister of Housing and Architecture | Mikhail Pozokhin | 15 October 1964 – 3 August 1966 |

== Committees ==
| Committee | Chairman | Period |
|---|---|---|
| Chairman of the State Control Commission | Aleksandr Shelepin | 15 October 1964 – 3 December 1965 |
| Chairman of the People's Control Commission | Pavel Kovanov | 3 December 1965 – 3 August 1966 |
| Chairman of the State Planning Committee | Pyotr Lomako | 15 October 1964 – 2 December 1965 |
| Chairman of the State Planning Committee | Nikolai Baibakov | 2 December 1965 – 3 August 1966 |
| Chairman of State Committee for State Security (KGB) | Vladimir Semichastny | 15 October 1964 – 3 August 1966 |

Government offices
| Preceded by Khrushchev II | Governments of the Soviet Union; 15 October 1964–3 August 1966 | Succeeded by Kosygin II |
