= Kosygin's Second Government =

Government of the Soviet Union

- 20th Government of the Soviet Union

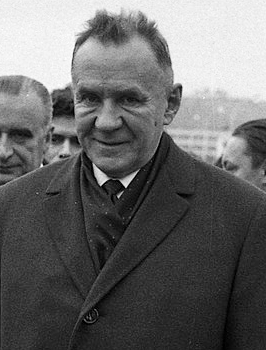
- Date formed: 3 August 1966
- Date dissolved: 14 June 1970

People and organisations
- Head of state: Anastas Mikoyan Nikolai Podgorny
- Head of government: Alexei Kosygin
- Deputy head of government: Dmitry Polyansky Kirill Mazurov
- Member party: CPSU
- Status in legislature: One Party State

History
- Legislature term: 7th Convocation of the Supreme Soviet
- Predecessor: Kosygin's First Government
- Successor: Kosygin's Third Government

Alexei Kosygin's second government lasted four years, until the 1970 Soviet election held on 14 June. Many new ministries were created under it.

The former government of Alexei Kosygin was dissolved following the Soviet legislative election of 1966. Kosygin was once again elected Premier by the Politburo and the Central Committee following the election.

== Ministries ==
Ministry	Minister	Period
Chairman of the Council of Ministers)	Alexei Kosygin	3 August 1966 – 14 June 1970
First Deputy Chairman of the Council of Ministers	Dmitry Polyansky	3 August 1966 – 14 June 1970
First Deputy Chairman of the Council of Ministers	Kirill Mazurov	3 August 1966 – 14 June 1970
Deputy Chairman of the Council of Ministers	Ignati Novikov	3 August 1966 – 14 June 1970
Deputy Chairman of the Council of Ministers	Venyamin Dymshitz	3 August 1966 – 14 June 1970
Deputy Chairman of the Council of Ministers	Mikhail Lesetshko	3 August 1966 – 14 June 1970
Deputy Chairman of the Council of Ministers	Leonid Smirnov	3 August 1966 – 14 June 1970
Deputy Chairman of the Council of Ministers	Nikolai Baibakov	3 August 1966 – 14 June 1970
Deputy Chairman of the Council of Ministers	Vladimir Kirillin	3 August 1966 – 14 June 1970
Deputy Chairman of the Council of Ministers	Nikolai Tikhonov	3 August 1966 – 14 June 1970
Deputy Chairman of the Council of Ministers	Mikhail Yefremov	3 August 1966 – 14 June 1970
Minister of Foreign Trade	Nikolai Patolitshev	3 August 1966 – 14 June 1970
Minister of Railways	Boris Beshchev	3 August 1966 – 14 June 1970
Minister of Merchant Marine	Viktor Bakajev	3 August 1966 – 14 January 1970
Minister of Merchant Marine	Timofei Guzenko	14 January – 14 June 1970
Minister of Medium Machine Building	Yefim Slavski	3 August 1966 – 14 June 1970
Minister of Transport Construction	Yevgeni Kozhevnikov	3 August 1966 – 14 June 1970
Minister of Aviation Industry	Pyotr Dementev	3 August 1966 – 14 June 1970
Minister of Shipbuilding	Boris Butoma	3 August 1966 – 14 June 1970
Minister of Radio Industry	Valeri Kalmykov	3 August 1966 – 14 June 1970
Minister of Foreign Affairs	Andrei Gromyko	3 August 1966 – 14 June 1970
Minister of Internal Affairs	Nikolai Shchelokov	17 September 1966 – 14 June 1970
Minister of Culture	Yekaterina Furtseva	3 August 1966 – 14 June 1970
Minister of Education	Mikhail Prokofjev	3 August 1966 – 14 June 1970
Minister of Higher Education	Vjatsheslav Yeljutin	3 August 1966 – 14 June 1970
Minister of Finance	Vasily Garbuzov	3 August 1966 – 14 June 1970
Minister of Commerce	Aleksandr Strujev	3 August 1966 – 14 June 1970
Minister of Defence	Rodion Malinovsky	3 August 1966 – 31 March 1967
Minister of Defence	Andrei Grechko	12 April 1967 – 14 June 1970
Minister of Communications	Nikolai Psurtshev	3 August 1966 – 31 March 1967
Minister of Health	Boris Petrovsky	3 August 1966 – 7 July 1970
Minister of Agriculture	Vladimir Matskevich	3 August 1966 – 7 July 1970
Minister of Geology	Aleksandr Sidorenko	3 August 1966 – 7 July 1970
Minister of Energy and Electrification	Pyotr Neporozhny	3 August 1966 – 7 July 1970
Minister of Civil Aviation	Yevgeni Loginov	3 August 1966 – 20 May 1970
Minister of Civil Aviation	Boris Bugajev	20 May 1970 – 7 July 1970
Minister of Ferrous Metallurgy	Ivan Kazanetz	3 August 1966 – 7 July 1970
Minister of Coal Industry	Boris Bratshenko	3 August 1966 – 7 July 1970
Minister of Chemical Industry	Leonid Kostandov	3 August 1966 – 7 July 1970
Minister of Oil Industry	Valentin Shashin	3 August 1966 – 7 July 1970
Minister of Oil and Petrochemical Industry	Viktor Fjodorov	3 August 1966 – 7 July 1970
Minister of Timber and Wood Processing Industry	Nikolai Timofjejev	3 August 1966 – 7 July 1970
Minister of Building Materials Industry	Ivan Grishmanov	3 August 1966 – 7 July 1970
Minister of Light Industry	Nikolai Tarasov	3 August 1966 – 7 July 1970
Minister of Food Industry	Vasili Zotov	3 August 1966 – 16 January 1970
Minister of Food Industry	Voldemar Lein	16 January – 7 July 1970
Minister of Fish Industry	Aleksandr Ishkov	3 August 1966 – 7 July 1970
Minister of Meat and Dairy Industry	Sergei Antonov	3 August 1966 – 7 July 1970
Minister of Heavy and Transport Machines Construction	Vladimir Zhigalin	3 August 1966 – 7 July 1970
Minister of Construction of Tool-Machines	Anatoli Kostousov	3 August 1966 – 7 July 1970
Minister of Construction, Road Building and Communal Machines	Jefim Novosjelov	3 August 1966 – 7 July 1970
Minister of Tractors and Agricultural Machines	Ivan Sinizyn	3 August 1966 – 7 July 1970
Minister of Automobile Industry	Aleksandr Tarasov	3 August 1966 – 7 July 1970
Minister of Construction of Petrochemical Machinery	Konstantin Brekhov	3 August 1966 – 7 July 1970
Minister of Electrical Engineering	Aleksei Antonov	3 August 1966 – 7 July 1970
Minister of Instrument-Making, Automation and Control Systems	Konstantin Rudnev	3 August 1966 – 7 July 1970
Minister of Machine Building for Light and Food Industries	Vasili Doyenin	3 August 1966 – 7 July 1970
Minister of Assembling and Special Construction	Fuad Jakubowski	3 August 1966 – 7 July 1970
Minister of Land Reclamation and Water Conservancy	Yevgeni Aleksejevski	3 August 1966 – 7 July 1970
Minister of Gas Industry	Aleksei Kortunov	3 August 1966 – 7 July 1970
Minister of General Machine Building	Sergei Afanasjev	3 August 1966 – 7 July 1970
Minister of Non-Ferrous Metallurgy	Pyotr Lomako	3 August 1966 – 7 July 1970
Minister of Electronic Industry	Aleksandr Shokin	3 August 1966 – 7 July 1970
Minister of Defence Industry	Sergei Sverov	3 August 1966 – 7 July 1970
Minister of Housing and Architecture	Mikhail Pozokhin	3 August 1966 – 7 July 1970
Minister of Construction of Heavy Industry	Nikolai Goldin	21 February 1967 – 7 July 1970
Minister of Industrial Construction	Aleksandr Tokarjev	21 February 1967 – 7 July 1970
Minister of Agricultural Construction	Stepan Khitrov	21 February 1967 – 7 July 1970
Minister of Construction	Georgi Karavajev	21 February 1967 – 7 July 1970
Minister of Medical Industry	Pyotr Gusenko	25 April 1967 – 7 July 1970
Minister of Machine Building	Vjatsheslav Bakhirov	5 February 1968 – 7 July 1970
Minister of Cellulose and Paper Industry	Konstantin Galantshin	3 July 1968 – 7 July 1970

== Committees ==
Committee	Chairman	Period
Chairman of the People's Control Commission	Pavel Kovanov	3 August 1966 – 14 July 1970
Chairman of the State Planning Committee	Nikolai Baibakov	3 August 1966 – 14 July 1970
Chairman of State Committee for State Security (KGB)	Vladimir Semichastny	15 October 1964 – 19 May 1967
Chairman of State Committee for State Security (KGB)	Yuri Andropov	19 May 1967 – 14 July 1970

Government offices
Preceded by Kosygin I	Governments of the Soviet Union; 3 August 1966–14 July 1970	Succeeded by Kosygin III
