= Departments of the Communist Party of the Soviet Union =

The Departments of the Central Committee of the Communist Party of the Soviet Union were all specialised in their own field, for example, the International Department handled Soviet relations with non-ruling communist parties.

== Key ==
- A–U is an abbreviation of All-Union, in this case All-Union Ministries. The All-Union ministries were ministries with no regional ministerial branches in the republics.
- U–R is an abbreviation of Union Republic, in this case Union republican ministries. Union republican ministries were either All-Union ministries with republican branches or republican ministries without an All-Union affiliate.
- Pres. is short for Presidium, in this case Presidium of the Council of Ministers. In the tables. Pres. denotes ministers or chairmen of state committees who held seats in the Presidium.

== Departments ==
Department	Responsible for	Sections
Administrative Organs	Ministry of Civil Aviation (A–U); Ministry of Defence (A–U); Ministry of Internal Affairs (U–R); Ministry of Justice (U–R); Committee for State Security (Pres.); Procuracy; Supreme Court; Civil defense units, included DOSAAF	
Agriculture	Ministry of Agriculture (U–R); Ministry of Agricultural Products Procurement (U–R); Ministry of Reclamation and Water Management (U–R); State Committee for Forestry (Pres.); All-Union Agricultural Supply Agency (Pres.)	Land cultivation; Mechanisation; Procurements; Reclamations and water economy; Forestry; (Agricultural) science; Special sections for certain territories, for instance, their existed a Northern Caucasus section.
Chemical Industry	Ministry of Cellulose-Paper Industry (A–U); Ministry of Chemical Industry (U–R); Ministry of Oil-Refining and Petrochemical Industry (U–R)	
Construction	Ministry of Assembly and Special Construction (A–U); Ministry of Building Materials Industry (U–R); Ministry of Construction (U–R); Ministry of Construction in the Oil and Gas Industry (A–U); Ministry of Construction of Heavy Industry (U–R); Ministry of Industrial Construction (U–R); Ministry of Rural Construction (U–R); Ministry of Timber and Wood-Working Industry (U–R); Ministry of Transportation Construction (U–R); State Committee for Construction (Pres.); Scientific Academy for Construction and Architecture; Union of Architects	Industrial and transportation construction; Urban economy; Timber and woodworking industry
Culture	Ministry of Culture (U–R); State Committee for Cinematography (Pres.); Writers, artists, composers union	Cinematography; Literature; Musical arts; Theater
Defence Industry	Ministry of Aviation Industry (A–U); Ministry of Defence Industry (A–U); Ministry of General Machine Industry (A–U); Ministry of Medium Machine Industry (A–U); Ministry of Radio-technical Industry (A–U); Ministry of Shipbuilding Industry (A–U); State Committee for the Peaceful Use of Atomic Energy	
Foreign Cadres	Ministry of Foreign Affairs (U–R); Ministry of Foreign Trade (A–U); State Committee for Foreign Economic Ties	
General	Responsible for handling intra-Secretariat and intra-Central Committee housekeeping, the handling of incoming communications, and security for classified documents	
Heavy Industry	Ministry of Coal Industry (U–R); Ministry of Gas Industry (A–U); Ministry of Geology (U–R); Ministry of Iron and Steel Industry (U–R); Ministry of Non-Ferrous Metallurgy (U–R); Ministry of Oil Industry (A–U)	
Information	Probably supervised TASS; The department's head acted as Leonid Brezhnev's Press Secretary	
International	Responsible for maintaining ties with communist parties in non-socialist states.; Probably supervised the ministries the Foreign Cadres Department was responsible for.	Africa; Central Europe; Great Britain and the Commonwealth; Latin America; Near East; Southeast Asia; Scandinavia and Iceland; United States; International Social Organizations
Light- and Food Industry	Ministry of Fisheries (U–R); Ministry of Food Industry (U–R); Ministry of Light Industry (U–R); Ministry of Meat and Dairy Industry (U–R)	Fisheries; Food Industry; Meat and Dairy Industry
Machinery Industry	Ministry of Automobile and Truck Industry (A–U); Ministry of Chemical and Petroleum Machinery Industry (A–U); Ministry of Construction, Road and Communal Machinery Industries (A–U); Ministry of Energy and Electrification (U–R); Ministry of Energy Machinery Industry (A–U); Ministry of Heavy and Transport Machinery Industries (A–U); Ministry of Instrument, Means of Automation and Control Systems Industries (A–U); Ministry of Machinery for Livestock Raising and the Feed Industry (A–U); Ministry of Machinery for Light and Food Industries and for Consumer Appliances (A–U); Ministry of Machine-Tool and Tool Industry (A–U); Ministry of Tractor and Agricultural Machinery Industry (A–U)	
Organisational-party Work	Local party organs; People's Control Committee (Pres.); Party membership records and statistics; Local soviets; Komsomol; Trade unions	Individual party card; Leading personnel registration; Party information; Komsomol and trade union organs; Ukrainian SSR, Moldavian SSR, Estonian SSR, Lithuanian SSR, Latvian SSR, Belarusian SSR, Soviet Central Asia (Kazakh SSR, Turkmen SSR, Kyrgyz SSR and Uzbek SSR), Transcaucasia and several important sections for Russian SFSR territories, such as the Far East Oblast for instance.
Planning and Financial Organs	Ministry of Finance (U–R); State Committee for Labor and Social Questions (Pres.); State Committee for Prices (Pres.); State Committee for Supplies Procurement (Pres.); State Committee for Standards (Pres.); State Planning Committee (Pres.); Central Bank (Pres.); Central Statistical Administration (Pres.); Construction Bank	
Political Administration of the Ministry of Defence	Political organs in the armed forces, and through them, the Ministry of Defence, however, the Administrative Organs Department was also responsible for the defence ministry.	
Propaganda	State Committee for Publishing, Printing and Book Trade (Pres.); State Committee for Television and Radio (Pres.); State Committee for Sports and Physical Culture (Pres.); Propaganda-agitation work conducted by party, state or other organisations, the political education of party cadres, the publishing of newspapers and journals and cultural work for trade unions.	Cultural-enlightenment work; Economic education; Mass-political work; Newspapers; Party education; Printing industry and press distribution; Sports and physical culture; Television and Radio
Science and Education	Responsible for diplomatic ties with ruling communist parties; May have supervised the ministries of the Foreign Cadres Department, at least when it came to relations with ruling-communist parties.	Economic sciences; Higher educational institutions; Philosophy and scientific communism; Public health and social security; Schools; Specialised secondary- and vocational-technical education.
Trade and Consumers' Services	Ministry of Trade (U–R); Consumers' Coops; Republican ministries responsible for utilities and consumers's services.	
Transportation-Communications	Ministry of Communications (U–R); Ministry of Merchant Marine (A–U); Ministry of Railroads (A–U); Russian SFSR Ministry of River Transport; Republican ministries responsible for auto-truck transport.	
Women		Women affairs.
Sources: How the Soviet Union is Governed (1979) pp. 412–417 and pp. 420–421
