= Antonina Khlebushkina =

Soviet politician

Antonina Pavlovna Khlebushkina (Uzbek: Antonina Pavlovna Xlebushkina, Russian: Антонина Павловна Хлебушкина; 18 December 1914 in Samara Governorate of the Russian Empire — 18 November 1995 Tashkent) was a Soviet economic, state and political figure, Hero of Socialist Labour.

== Biography ==
Born in 1914 in Samara Governorate. Member of the Communist Party of the Soviet Union.

Since 1926 - on economic, public and political work. In 1926-1995 she was babysitter for wealthy peasants, educator in the Tajik and Uzbek SSR, director of the Central Children's Tourist and Excursion Station in Tashkent. At the beginning of 1942, hundreds of trains with evacuated people began to arrive in the Uzbek SSR from the front line, from destroyed towns and villages, where most of them were sick and hungry children, and the problem of their resettlement arose. Many families took several children with them. Children's homes were organized all over the republic. And at the same time, in the summer of 1942, the Main Department of Military-Industrial Construction of Moscow adopted a resolution to open Children's Home No. 22 in Tashkent for orphans of military builders.Then she became the director of Children's Home No. 22 in Tashkent, Uzbek SSR.

Famous graduates of Children's Home No. 22 in Tashkent are Pulat Nugmanov, Minister of Installation and Special Construction Works of Uzbekistan, Tamara Yunusova, People's Artist of Uzbekistan, Olga Sultanova and Flora Кaydani, Honoured Artists of Uzbekistan, ballet dancers.

By Decree of the Presidium of the Supreme Soviet of the USSR of 16 December 1987, she was awarded the title of Hero of Socialist Labour with the Order of Lenin and the gold medal "Hammer and sickle" ("Серп и Молот") for her great services in the communist upbringing, education and civic development of orphans and children left without parental care.

She was elected a deputy of the Supreme Soviet of the Uzbek Soviet Socialist Republic of the 11th and 12th convocations.

Laureate of the Lenin Komsomol Prize (1986), International Prize and gold medal named after Leo Tolstoy (1987).

Died in Tashkent in 1995, buried in the Dombrobod cemetery.
