= Oleg Anfimov =

Soviet engineer and politician (1937–2019)

Minister of Electrical Equipment Industry
- In office 20 July 1986 – 24 August 1991
- Premier: Nikolai Ryzhkov
- Succeeded by: Office abolished

Personal details
- Born: Oleg Grigoriyevich Anfimov; 19 February 1937 Shakhty, Rostov Oblast, Soviet Union
- Died: 9 July 2019 (aged 82)
- Party: Communist Party
- Education: Riga Polytechnical Institute

Oleg Anfimov (Олег Анфимов; 19 February 1937 – 9 July 2019) was a Soviet engineer and politician who was the minister of electrical equipment industry of the Soviet Union between 1986 and 1991.

== Biography ==
Anfimov was born in Shakhty on 19 February 1937. He was a graduate of the Riga Polytechnical Institute where he obtained a degree in electromechanical engineering. He was a member of the Communist Party. He served in different posts in the party, including the Riga Gorkom Party secretary and secretary of the central committee of the Communist Party of Latvia. He was general director of Riga electro-machinery works from 1981 to 1983. He served as the minister of electrical equipment industry between 20 July 1986 and 24 August 1991. In the period 1986–1989 Anfimov was a deputy at the Supreme Soviet.

In November 1991 Anfimov was appointed president of a state-owned corporation. Then he was made a member of the coordinating council of the Russian Union of Mechanical Engineers. He also served as a member of the advisory council of the Ministry of Industry and Trade of the Russian Federation.

Anfimov died on 9 July 2019.
