= Ministry of Electrical Industry =

Government ministry of the Soviet Union

The Ministry of the Electrical Industry (Russian: Министерство электропромышленности СССР) was a government ministry in the Soviet Union.

== History ==
The Ministry of Electrical Industry USSR originated from the Main Administration of Electric Power Industry (Glavenergoprom) of the People's Commissariat of Heavy Industry. A law of 11 May 1937 authorized the subdivision of the Main Administration of Electric Power Industry into two main administrations. On 24 January 1939, when the People's Commissariat of Heavy Industry USSR was divided into six people's commissariats, one of the six was the People's Commissariat of Electric Power Stations and Electrical Industry USSR.

The Main Administration for the Sale of Electrical Engineering Output (glavelektrosbyt) was organized into the People's Commissariat of Electric Power Stations and Electrical Industry in September 1939. A ukase of 17 Aprile 1940 established the People's Commissariat of Electrical Industry USSR, giving it jurisdiction over the following enterprises: electrical machine building, electrical apparatus building, telephone and telegraph, storage battery, cable, lighting engineering, electrical insulation products, electrical measuring instruments, automatic instruments, telemechanical instruments, radio apparatus, and boiler and turbine building enterprises.

By the law of 15 March 1946, which reorganized the Council of People's Commissars into the Council of Ministers USSR, the People's Commissariat of Electrical Industry became the Ministry of Electrical Industry. A ukase of the Presidium of the Supreme Soviet of 28 June 1946 divided the Ministry of Electrical Industry into two ministries: the Ministry of Communication Equipment Industry, with control over enterprises and organizations producing radar, radio engineering, and telephone and telegraph equipment, vacuum tubes, storage batteries, battery cells, and carbon electrical products, and the Ministry of Electrical Industry, with control over enterprises and organizations producing electrical machinery and apparatus, electrical hoist and transport equipment, electrical precision measuring instruments, cable, and electrical insulation products.

== List of ministers ==
- Ivan Kabanov (19.3.1946 - 2.4.1951)
- Dmitri Yefremov (16.5.1951 - 6.3.1953)
