= Ministry of General Machine-Building =

Soviet aerospace department (1955–1957, 1965–1991)

- Министерство общего машиностроения

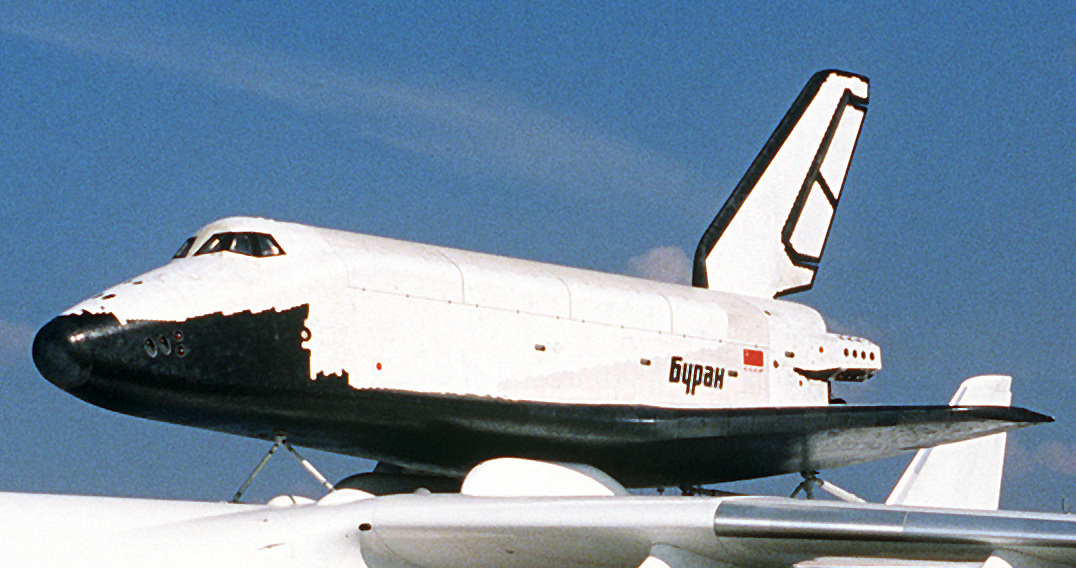
- Buran at the 1989 Paris Air Show

Agency overview
- Formed: 2 April 1955; 71 years ago (initially); 2 March 1965; 61 years ago (reestablished)
- Preceding agency: State Committee on Defense Technology
- Dissolved: 10 May 1957; 69 years ago (initially); 1 December 1991; 34 years ago (permanently)
- Superseding agency: Russian Space Agency
- Jurisdiction: Government of the Soviet Union
- Employees: 1,000,000–1,500,000
- Minister responsible: Minister of General Machine-Building
- Parent agency: Military-Industrial Commission
- Child agencies: OKB-1; Glavkosmos; Research Institute of Machine-Building Technology

The Ministry of General Machine-Building (Russian: Министерство общего машиностроения; MOM), also known as Minobshchemash, was a government ministry of the Soviet Union from 1955 to 1957 and from 1965 to 1991. The ministry supervised design bureaus that managed the research, development, and production of ballistic missiles as well as launch vehicles and satellites in the Soviet space program.

While Soviet rocketry organizations date back to 1921, the Ministry of General Machine-Building, upon being founded in 1955, became a dedicated department for aerospace technology. It was dissolved in 1957 but was reinstated in 1965. Various projects of the Soviet space program were developed at the ministry. It also began commercially providing launch services abroad through its Glavkosmos agency during the perestroika reforms of the late 1980s. The ministry was permanently abolished in 1991 amid the dissolution of the Soviet Union. The Russian Space Agency, which would later become Roscosmos, was created in 1992 as its successor.

== History ==
The first Soviet organization dedicated to rocket technology was the Gas Dynamics Laboratory, founded in 1921 by Nikolai Tikhomirov. The laboratory researched and developed solid-propellant rockets, which became the prototypes of missiles in the Katyusha rocket launcher, as well as liquid-propellant rockets, which became the prototypes of Soviet rockets and spacecraft. An organization with a similar purpose, the Group for the Study of Reactive Motion, was founded in 1931. The two groups merged in 1933 to form the Reactive Scientific Research Institute, the responsibility of which was transferred to the People’s Commissariat of Aviation Industry in 1944.

The first rendition of the Ministry of General Machine-Building was created by a decree of the Supreme Soviet of the Soviet Union on 2 April 1955 with the active participation of the Academy of Sciences of the Soviet Union. The ministry was formed to focus specifically on rocketry. Its intentionally vague name was chosen for purposes of secrecy. Major General of the Engineering and Artillery Service Pyotr Nikolaevich Goremykin, who had held the post of Minister of Agricultural Engineering from June 1946 to March 1951, was appointed as Minister of General Machine-Building. The ministry was dissolved on 10 May 1957 and its functions were transferred.

The Ministry of General Machine-Building was reestablished on 2 March 1965 as a successor to the State Committee on Defense Technology. Sergey Afanasyev became Minister and Leonid Ivanovich Gusev became Deputy Minister while Vladimir Chelomey was the general designer of rocket technology. Transferred to the new ministry were factories from the defense, aviation, radio engineering, and shipbuilding industries, alongside leading design bureaus and research institutes such as the Research Institute of Machine-Building Technology (known as NITI-40 until 1966). Many of these were headed by academicians such as Sergei Korolev, Kerim Kerimov, Mikhail Yangel, Valentin Glushko, Vladimir Chelomey, Viktor Makeyev, Mikhail Reshetnev, Nikolay Pilyugin, Vladimir Barmin, Mikhail Ryazansky, Viktor Makeev, and Viktor Litvinov. In 1977, the ministry received its own trade union.

On 26 February 1985, the Ministry of General Machine-Building issued an order that formed Glavkosmos. The subsidiary was originally envisioned as an executive agency to command all Soviet space activities, but in practice it functioned more as a marketing and coordinating body. Glavkosmos became the prime authority for implementing cooperative agreements with foreign bodies, with activities including commercial utilization of Soviet systems and approving foreign cosmonauts to fly aboard Soviet spacecraft.

Many subsidiaries of the Ministry of General Machine-Building served as primary organizations in the management of the Soviet space program; the ministry controlled roughly 1200 factories and employed between 1 million and 1.5 million people at its peak. However, contrary to its competitors (NASA in the United States, the European Space Agency in Western Europe, and the Ministry of Aerospace Industry in China), which had their programs run under single coordinating agencies, the executive architecture of the Soviet space program was multi-centered; several internally competing design bureaus, technical councils, ministry staffs, and expert commissions all held more influence over the program than political leadership. The creation of a central agency after the dissolution of the Soviet Union and establishment of the Russian Federation was therefore a new development. The Ministry of General Machine-Building was dissolved on 1 December 1991 on the basis of a 14 November resolution of the State Council of the Soviet Union. The Russian Space Agency, which eventually would become Roscosmos, was formed as its successor on 25 February 1992 by a decree of President Boris Yeltsin. Yuri Koptev, who previously had worked with designing Mars landers at NPO Lavochkin, became the first director of the agency.

In 2013, when the Russian space sector was being reorganized, one option considered was the creation of a ministry similar to the Ministry of General Machine-Building.

== Activities ==
The Ministry of General Machine-Building was in charge of space technology as well as intercontinental ballistic missiles, except for solid-fueled missiles; these instead were developed by the Moscow Institute of Thermal Technology, which from 1966 was under the jurisdiction of the Ministry of Defense Industry. Design bureaus such as OKB-1 were subordinated to the ministry. The ministry reported to the Military-Industrial Commission of the Soviet Union, which coordinated its activity with eight other military-industrial ministries.

The R-12 Dvina missile was produced simultaneously at four enterprises within the ministry. In April 1970, Minister of General Machine-Building Sergey Afanasyev sent a memo to the chairperson of the Military-Industrial Commission that recommended negotiations with NASA, the space agency of the United States. These negotiations were approved the next month and eventually led to the 1975 Apollo–Soyuz mission. Work on the GLONASS system for satellite navigation began at the ministry in 1976. The ministry contributed to the construction of the RT-2PM Topol missile system, which began deployment in 1985. The combat railway missile complex, a mobile missile system, began deployment in October 1987; its development had started in January 1969 with an order from Afanasyev.

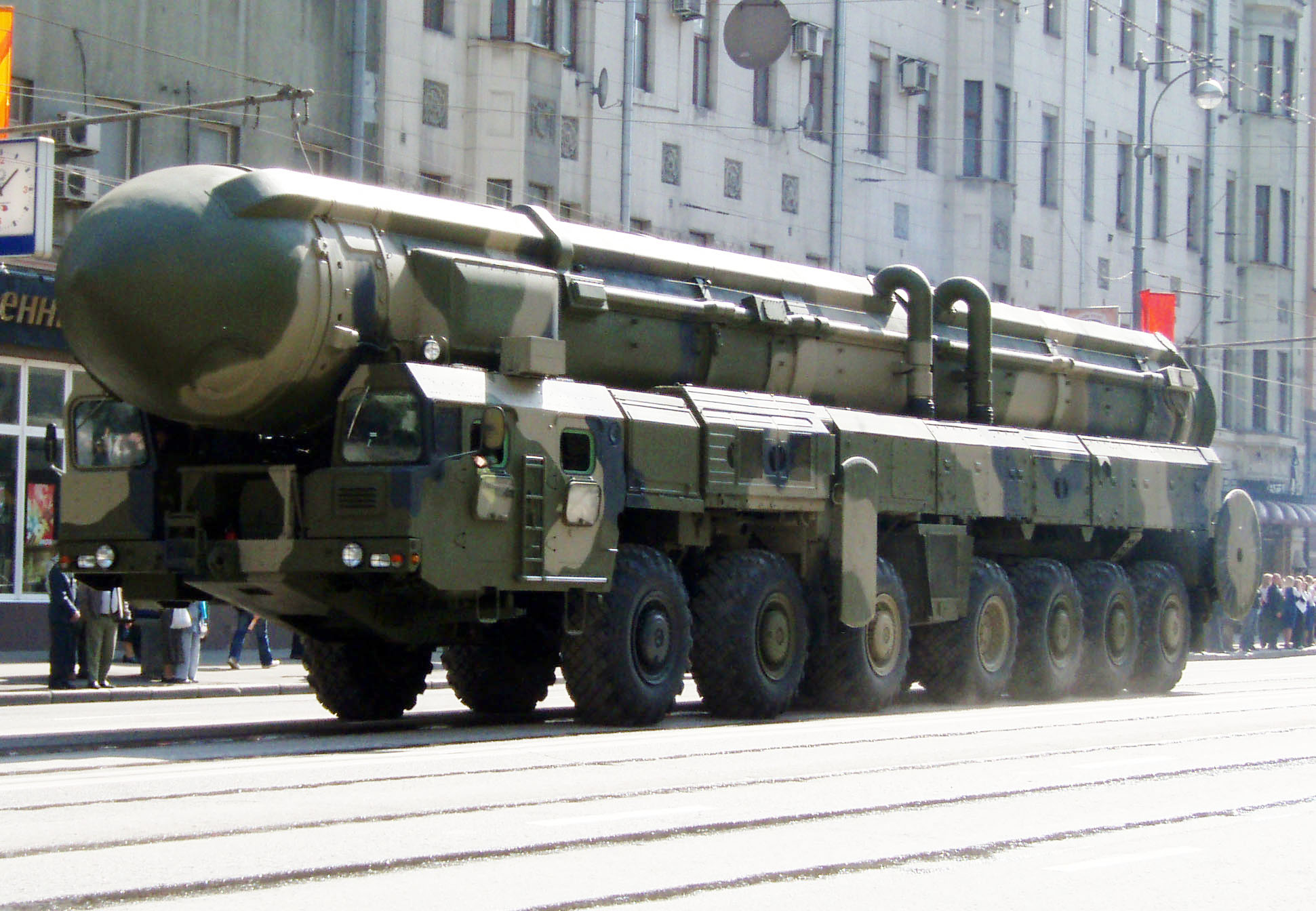
An RT-2PM Topol on a mobile launcher at a Victory Day parade rehearsal in Moscow, 2008

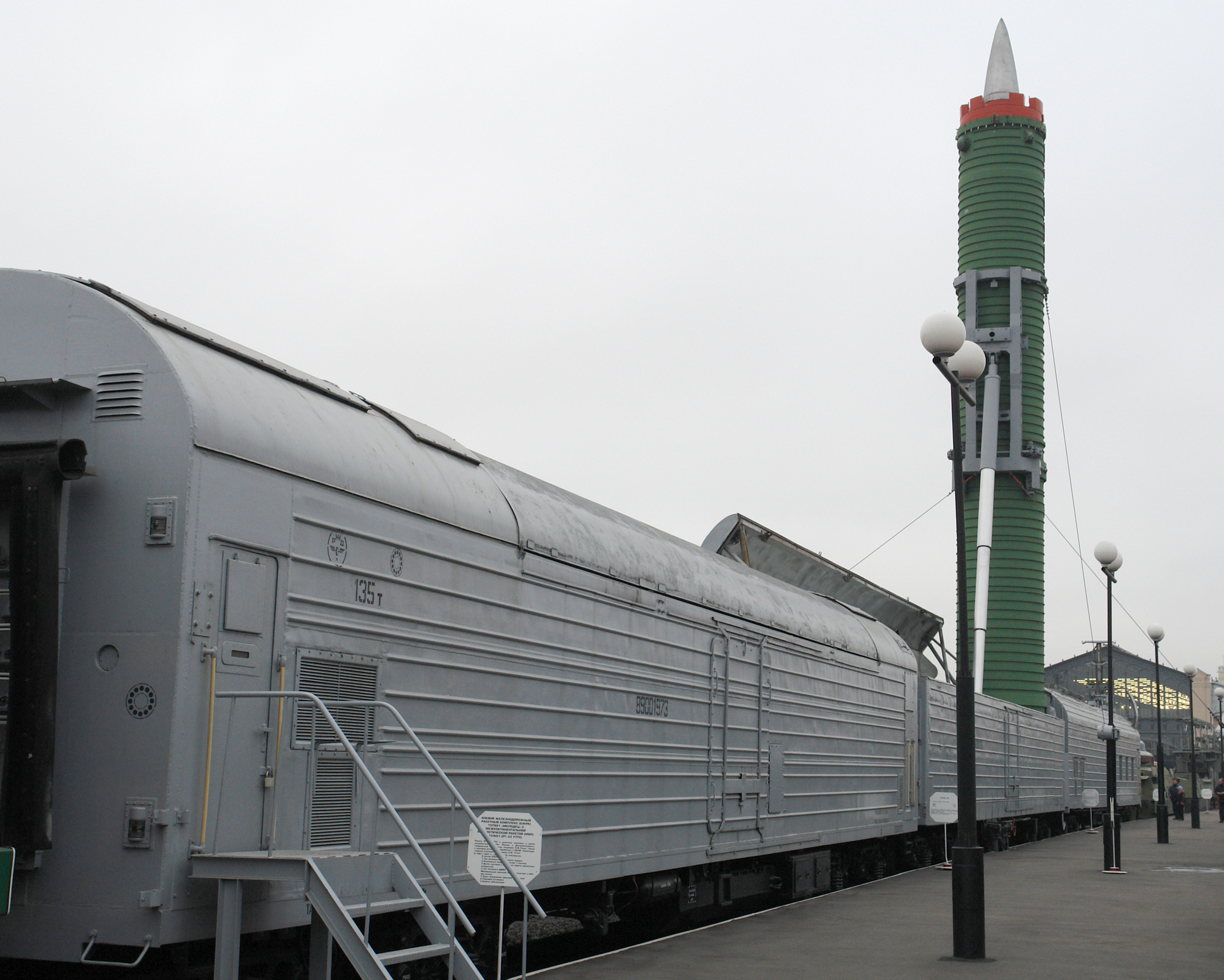
The combat railway missile complex on display in Saint Petersburg, 2007

During the perestroika reform movement of the late 1980s, the Glavkosmos agency of the ministry began offering commercial services for global customers, aiming primarily at competing with United States launchers. Its first commercial offering was presented at the Space Commerce '88 trade show in Montreux, Switzerland. Most notably, it featured the sales of the following launchers: Energia, with a payload of up to 100 tons to Low Earth orbit; Proton with a payload of up to 20 tons to Low Earth orbit or 2 tons to geostationary orbit for between US$25 million and US$30 million; Tsyklon-3 for payloads of up to 4 tons to Low Earth orbit; a family of Soyuz rockets in configurations for Low Earth, geostationary transfer, and Molniya orbits; and the Vostok launchers for between US$12 million and US$18 million. Glavkosmos also featured Kosmos rockets with the successfully completed launches of Indian Aryabhata and Bhaskara satellites. Other offerings included the sales of Okean-O1 satellites or the use of space on the Foton satellites and Mir space station. During the conference several contracts were signed, including down payments for three satellite launches for undisclosed customers, an option for a launch of the Aussat-2 on Proton, a contract with Payload Systems Inc. for experiments in protein crystallization on Mir, and a contract with Kayser-Threde for microgravity experiments on the Foton satellites in 1989, 1990, and 1991.

The Buran program to develop reusable spacecraft was managed jointly by the Ministry of General Machine-Building and Ministry of Aviation Industry. Despite various disputes about the program between the two ministries, Buran, the first spacecraft to be produced as part of the program, successfully completed the sole flight of the program in November 1988.

The final project of the ministry before its liquidation was a 1991 US$120 million agreement between Glavkosmos and ISRO, the space agency of India, which included the transfer of two KVD-1 engines for use as the third stage of the Geosynchronous Satellite Launch Vehicle as well as design details such that the KVD-1 could be built indigenously in India. Russia backed out of the agreement in 1993 after the United States objected to the deal and imposed sanctions on the grounds that the deal was a violation of the Missile Technology Control Regime, forcing ISRO to sign a more limited agreement with Russia and to initiate a project to develop its own cryogenic engine.

During its existence, the Ministry of General Machine-Building offered three awards. The "Excellence in Socialist Competition" award was approved on 1 September 1955 by order No. 134 and was awarded until 1957. The "Best Innovator" award was given out in the 1970s, and the "Best Inventor" award was offered until 1991.

== Minister of General Machine-Building ==
Minister of General Machine-Building

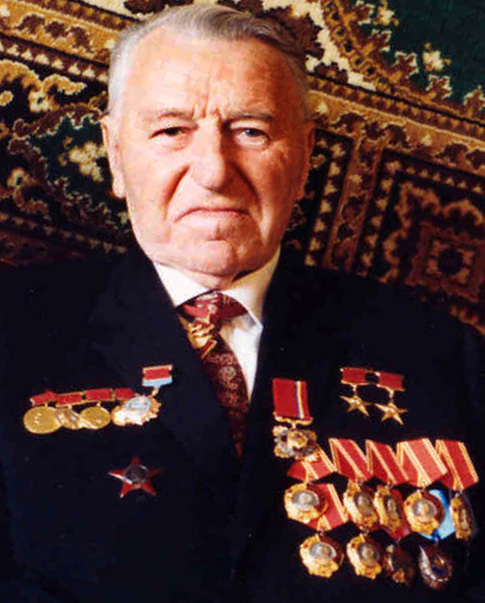
- Longest serving Sergey Afanasyev; 2 March 1965 – 8 April 1983
- Ministry of General Machine-Building
- Type: Government minister
- Status: Head of government ministry of the Soviet Union
- Formation: 2 April 1955; 71 years ago (initially); 2 March 1965; 61 years ago (reestablished)
- First holder: Pyotr Nikolaevich Goremykin
- Final holder: Oleg Shushkin
- Abolished: 10 May 1957; 69 years ago (initially); 24 August 1991; 35 years ago (permanently)
- Superseded by: General Director of Roscosmos
- Deputy: Deputy Minister of General Machine-Building

The Ministry of General Machine-Building had five ministers during its existence, one having been from its first incarnation and the remaining four from its second incarnation:

No.	Portrait		Name (birth–death)	Term			Cabinet
No.	Portrait		Name (birth–death)	Took office	Left office	Duration	Cabinet
1	External image: Portrait of Pyotr Nikolaevich Goremykin	Pyotr Nikolaevich Goremykin [ru]	Pyotr Nikolaevich Goremykin (1902–1976)	2 April 1955	10 May 1957	2 years, 38 days	Bulganin
Position abolished (10 May 1957 – 2 March 1965)
2		Sergey Afanasyev	Sergey Afanasyev (1918–2001)	2 March 1965	8 April 1983	18 years, 37 days	Kosygin I–II–III–IV–V; Tikhonov I
3		Oleg Baklanov	Oleg Baklanov (1932–2021)	8 April 1983	26 March 1988	4 years, 353 days	Tikhonov I–II; Ryzhkov I
4	External image: Portrait of Vitaly Doguzhiyev	Vitaly Doguzhiyev	Vitaly Doguzhiyev (1935–2016)	26 March 1988	17 July 1989	1 year, 113 days	Ryzhkov I
5		Oleg Shushkin [ru]	Oleg Shushkin (born 1934)	17 July 1989	24 August 1991	2 years, 38 days	Ryzhkov II; Pavlov

== See also ==
- Ministry of Medium Machine-Building, the Soviet ministry of nuclear industry
- People's Commissariat of Mortar Armament, initially known as the People's Commissariat of General Machine-Building Industry
