= Fuad Yakubovsky =

Soviet politician (1908–1975)

Fuad Borisovich Yakubovsky (Russian: Фуа́д Бори́сович Якубо́вский, August 3 (16), 1908 - March 27, 1975) was Minister of Installation and Special Construction Works of the USSR from 1965 to 1975. Candidate member of the CPSU Central Committee (1966-1975), deputy of the Supreme Soviet of the USSR 7-9 convocations.
