= Ministry of Oil Industry =

Government ministry of the Soviet Union

The Ministry of Oil Industry (Minnefteprom; Russian: Министерство нефтяной промышленности СССР) was a government ministry in the Soviet Union.

== History ==
The Ministry of the Petroleum Industry was created by the 28 December 1948 ukase of the Presidium of the Supreme Soviet USSR merging the Ministry of the Petroleum Industry of the Southern and Western Regions, the Ministry of the Petroleum Industry of the Eastern Regions, Glavgaztoppron (Main Administration of Synthetic Liquid Fuel and Gas), and Glavneftegazstroy (Main Administration for the Construction of the Petroleum and Gas Industry) under the Council of Ministers USSR, and Glavneftesnab (Main Administration for the Supply of Petroleum Products to the National Economy) under Gossnab USSR (State Committee of the Council of Ministers USSR for Material and Technical Supply to the National Economy).

The Ministry of Petroleum Industry (People's Commissariat of Petroleum Industry before 15 March 1946) was established 12 October 1939 by ukase of the Presidium, Supreme Soviet USSR, and was subdivided on 4 March 1946 into the Ministry of the Petroleum Industry of the Southern and Western Regions of the USSR and the Ministry of the Petroleum Industry of the Eastern Region of the USSR.

Prior to 1939, it had been a part of the All-Union People's Commissariat of the Fuel Industry, established 24 January 1939 by ukase of the Presidium, Supreme Soviet USSR, as a result of the subdivision of the People's Commissariat of Heavy Industry USSR.

== Organization ==
The Ministry of the Petroleum Industry was an all-Union ministry which administered the petroleum extraction, petroleum refining, and gas industries; the production of liquid fuels; the construction of installations for the petroleum and gas industries; the construction of petroleum-drilling machinery; and the marketing of petroleum products.

The Ministry of the Petroleum Industry was headed by a minister who directed the entire work of the Ministry of the Petroleum Industry and of the enterprises and organizations under its jurisdiction. The Minister of the Petroleum Industry issued, within the limits of his competence, orders and directives based on, and in execution of, existing laws, as well as of decrees and regulations of the Council of Ministers USSR, and he checked on their execution.

The minister of the petroleum industry appointed directors of main administrations, administrations, and divisions of the ministry and of the enterprises and organizations under its jurisdiction; he organized enterprises and organizations in accordance with established procedures; he approved statutes on main administrations, administrations, and divisions of the ministry as well as the statutes and charters of organizations and enterprises under the jurisdiction of the Ministry.

A collegium was formed within the Ministry of the Petroleum Industry, consisting of the minister (chairman), his deputies, and the supervisory personnel of the ministry. The membership of the collegium was approved by the Council of Ministers of the USSR, upon recommendation of the minister of the petroleum industry

The collegium of the Ministry of the Petroleum Industry, at its regular sessions, considered questions of practical supervision, of checking on the execution of decisions, and of selection of personnel, as well as the most important orders and directives of the Ministry; it hears the reports of the directors of main administrations, administrations, and divisions of the Ministry and of organizations and enterprises under its jurisdiction.

The decisions of the collegium are carried out by orders of the minister. The basic task, for the carrying out of which the Ministry of the Petroleum Industry is responsible, is to assure the development of the petroleum industry in accordance with plans approved by the USSR government, with the goal of completely satisfying the requirement of the rational economy for petroleum products and gas.

This goal was to be achieved by the introduction of the most modern equipment; by mechanizing and automatizing production processes in the extraction and refining of petroleum and gas; by the construction of oil fields, refineries, gas plants, plants for the production of synthetic liquid fuels, pipelines, and petroleum tanks; by the development of petroleum machinery building; by the creation of permanent cadres of qualified workers, engineers, and technicians; by increasing labor productivity; and by improving the quality of production and reducing its costs. The Ministry of the Petroleum Industry prepares production plans (prospective, yearly, quarterly), plans for capital construction, marketing, and railroad and water transport; as well as for balancing income and expenditures.

It submitted these plans for ratification by the Council of Ministers of the USSR in accordance with established procedure, and it takes measures toward the fulfillment of plans that have been ratified.

== Role ==
The Ministry of the Petroleum Industry organized the prospecting and surveying of new petroleum, gas, and ozocerite deposits by geological, geophysical, and geochemical surveying methods. It takes measures to increase labor productivity, to improve the quality of production, and to reduce the cost of production and construction. It exercises technical and production supervision over enterprises of the Ministry, and introduces the most modern equipment, technical improvements and inventions, mechanization and automation of production processes, and established norms for the consumption of materials, power, and fuel.

It drafts plans for production standards in branches of industry under the jurisdiction of the ministry and submits them for ratification according to established procedure. The ministry directs the construction of enterprises and installations of the petroleum industry and, in accordance with established procedure, ratifies planned quotas, technical plans, and estimates for capital construction. It organizes and supervises the material and technical supply of enterprises, organizations, and installations. It supervises the operations of enterprises that produce industrial and construction materials required by branches of industry under the jurisdiction of the Ministry.

The ministry handled the sales of petroleum products produced by enterprises of the Ministry of the Petroleum Industry through a system of administrations and petroleum bases of Glavneftesbyt (Main Administration of Petroleum Sales).

It selected the personnel of the ministry and takes measures to provide enterprises and construction projects of the ministry with personnel and to utilize them properly, at the same time providing for their living conditions.

It draws up regulations on the wages of workers, engineers, technicians, and employees of the enterprises; submits them for ratification by the Council of Ministers USSR, in accordance with established procedure; and supervises their application. It determines technical norms and the revision of output norms (except for the basic revision of norms carried out with the permission of the government), and checks on their fulfillment.

It supervised the observance of labor legislation and rules for accident prevention. Not only that, but it directs the conclusion of collective contracts and checks on their fulfillment. The ministry directs socialist competition to develop the creative initiative of workers, engineers, and technicians; to increase labor productivity further; to fulfill production plans ahead of schedule; to improve the quality of production; to increase profits of the enterprises; and to acquire above-plan accumulations.

It financed the enterprises and organizations of the ministry in accordance with established procedure, supervises their financial activity, and takes measures to speed up the turnover of working capital and to increase the profits of the enterprises. It supervises the organization and system of accounting, approves balances and reports of main administrations and organizations under the direct jurisdiction of the ministry, and draws up periodic and yearly accounting records for all types of industrial and administrative activity of the Ministry.

It exercises financial control and makes documentary revisions in the administration of the ministry. Furthermore, it administers scientific research institutes under the jurisdiction of the ministry, planning organizations, and educational establishments and directs the training of workers in the mass professions. It directs the activity of administrations and divisions of labor supply and subsidiary economies.

It takes measures for the protection of state socialist property in enterprises, establishments, and organizations under the ministry. It publishes literature on the technology, economics, and organization of the petroleum and gas industries. The structure of the Ministry of the Petroleum Industry is determined by the Council of Ministers USSR to utilize to the best advantage outstanding experiences of directors, ordinary workers, and Stakhanovites, the Ministry of the Petroleum Industry, its chain administrations, associations, trusts, and enterprises summon meetings at which reports are heard and discussed dealing with the most important party and government decisions as well as administrative directives of the Ministry. To develop criticism and self-criticism, questions on the activity of production and management are also discussed.

== List of ministers ==
No.	Portrait	Minister of Oil Industry	Took office	Left office	Time in office	Cabinet
1	Lazar Kaganovich	Lazar Kaganovich (1893–1991)	24 January 1939	3 July 1940	1 year, 161 days	Molotov IV
2	Ivan Sedin [ru]	Ivan Sedin (1906–1972)	3 July 1940	30 November 1944	4 years, 150 days	Molotov IV; Stalin I
3	Nikolai Baibakov	Nikolai Baibakov (1911–2008)	30 November 1944	25 May 1955	10 years, 176 days	Stalin I–II–III; Malenkov I–II; Bulganin
4	Mikhail Yevseenko [ru]	Mikhail Yevseenko (1908–1985)	25 May 1955	10 May 1957	1 year, 350 days	Bulganin
5	Valentin Shashin	Valentin Shashin (1916–1977)	2 October 1965	22 March 1977	11 years, 171 days	Kosygin I–II–III–IV
6	Nikolai Maltsev [ru]	Nikolai Maltsev (1928–2001)	5 April 1977	13 February 1985	7 years, 314 days	Kosygin IV–V; Tikhonov I–II
7	Vasili Dinkov [ru]	Vasili Dinkov (1924–2001)	13 February 1985	17 July 1989	4 years, 154 days	Tikhonov II; Ryzhkov I
