= 1979 Soviet Union legislative election =

- 4 March 1979
- Soviet of the Union
- All 750 seats in the Soviet of the Union
Party	Seats	+/–
Communist Party	549	−13
Independents	201	−4
This lists parties that won seats. See the complete results below.
- Soviet of Nationalities
- All 750 seats in the Soviet of Nationalities
Party	Seats	+/–
Communist Party	526	−8
Independents	224	+8
This lists parties that won seats. See the complete results below.
Chairman of the Council of Ministers before	Chairman of the Council of Ministers after
Alexei Kosygin; CPSU	Alexei Kosygin; CPSU

Supreme Soviet elections were held in the Soviet Union on 4 March 1979. They were the first elections held under the 1977 Soviet constitution, which slightly reformed the composition of the Supreme Soviet.

== Electoral system ==
Candidates had to be nominated by the Communist Party of the Soviet Union (CPSU) or by a public organisation. However, all public organisations were controlled by the party and were subservient to a 1931 law that required them to accept party rule. The CPSU itself remained the only legal one in the country.

Voters could vote against the CPSU candidate, but could only do so by using polling booths, whereas votes for the party could be cast simply by submitting a blank ballot. Turnout was required to be over 50% for the election to be valid.

While under the 1936 constitution the Supreme Soviet had been elected for a four-year term, and the Soviet of the Union had one deputy for every 300,000 people, the 1977 constitution extended the Supreme Soviet's term to five years, and made the number of seats in the lower house, the Soviet of the Union, equal to that of the upper Soviet of Nationalities, regardless of population size. While the five year-term was implemented immediately — the Supreme Soviet elected in 1974 had its term extended from 1978 to 1979 — the 1979 elections were the first in which both houses of the Supreme Soviet had the same number of members.

== Candidates ==
CPSU candidates accounted for around three quarters of the nominees, whilst many of the others were members of Komsomol.

== Results ==
=== Soviet of the Union ===
Party	Votes	%	Seats	+/–
Communist Party of the Soviet Union	174,734,459	99.89	549	–13
Independents	174,734,459	99.89	201	–4
Against	185,730	0.11	–	–
Total	174,920,189	100.00	750	–17
Valid votes	174,920,189	100.00		
Invalid/blank votes	32	0.00		
Total votes	174,920,221	100.00		
Registered voters/turnout	174,944,173	99.99		
Source: Nohlen & Stöver

=== Soviet of Nationalities ===
Party	Votes	%	Seats	+/–
Communist Party of the Soviet Union	174,770,398	99.91	526	–8
Independents	174,770,398	99.91	224	+8
Against	149,783	0.09	–	–
Total	174,920,181	100.00	750	0
Valid votes	174,920,181	100.00		
Invalid/blank votes	40	0.00		
Total votes	174,920,221	100.00		
Registered voters/turnout	174,944,173	99.99		
Source: Nohlen & Stöver
