= Ministry of Production of Mineral Fertilizers =

Government ministry of the Soviet Union

The Ministry of Production of Mineral Fertilizers (Minudobreniy; Russian: Министерство по производству минеральных удобрений СССР) was a government ministry in the Soviet Union.

Created on 5 November 1980, from a division of the USSR Ministry of the Chemical Industry into two ministries; the Ministry of Mineral Fertilizer Production and the Ministry of the Chemical Industry.

== List of ministers ==
- Aleksei Petrishchev (6 November 1980 – 30 August 1986)
- Nikolai Olshansky (30 August 1986 – 17 July 1989)
