= 1966 Soviet Union legislative election =

- 12 June 1966
- Soviet of the Union
- All 767 seats in the Soviet of the Union
Party	Seats	+/–
Communist Party	573	−31
Independents	194	+7
This lists parties that won seats. See the complete results below.
- Soviet of Nationalities
- All 750 seats in the Soviet of Nationalities
Party	Seats	+/–
Communist Party	568	+78
Independents	182	+20
This lists parties that won seats. See the complete results below.
Chairman of the Council of Ministers before	Chairman of the Council of Ministers after
Alexei Kosygin; CPSU	Alexei Kosygin; CPSU

Supreme Soviet elections were held in the Soviet Union on 12 June 1966.

== Electoral system ==
Candidates had to be nominated by the Communist Party of the Soviet Union (CPSU) or by a public organisation. However, all public organisations were controlled by the party and were subservient to a 1931 law that required them to accept party rule. The CPSU itself remained the only legal one in the country.

Voters could vote against the CPSU candidate if they wished, but could only do so by using polling booths, whereas votes for the party could be cast simply by submitting a blank ballot. Turnout was required to be over 50% for the election to be valid.

== Candidates ==
CPSU candidates accounted for around three quarters of the nominees, whilst many of the others were members of Komsomol.

== Results ==
=== Soviet of the Union ===
Party	Votes	%	Seats	+/–
Communist Party of the Soviet Union	143,570,976	99.76	573	–31
Independents	143,570,976	99.76	194	+7
Against	345,643	0.24	–	–
Total	143,916,619	100.00	767	–24
Valid votes	143,916,619	100.00		
Invalid/blank votes	412	0.00		
Total votes	143,917,031	100.00		
Registered voters/turnout	144,000,973	99.94		
Source: Nohlen & Stöver

=== Soviet of Nationalities ===
Party	Votes	%	Seats	+/–
Communist Party of the Soviet Union	143,595,678	99.78	568	+78
Independents	143,595,678	99.78	182	+20
Against	320,972	0.22	–	–
Total	143,916,650	100.00	750	+98
Valid votes	143,916,650	100.00		
Invalid/blank votes	381	0.00		
Total votes	143,917,031	100.00		
Registered voters/turnout	144,000,973	99.94		
Source: Nohlen & Stöver
