= 1974 Soviet Union legislative election =

- 16 June 1974
- Soviet of the Union
- All 767 seats in the Soviet of the Union
| Party | Seats | +/– |
|---|---|---|
| Communist Party | 562 | 0 |
| Independents | 205 | 0 |
This lists parties that won seats. See the complete results below.
- Soviet of Nationalities
- All 750 seats in the Soviet of Nationalities
| Party | Seats | +/– |
|---|---|---|
| Communist Party | 534 | 0 |
| Independents | 216 | 0 |
This lists parties that won seats. See the complete results below.
| Chairman of the Council of Ministers before | Chairman of the Council of Ministers after |
|---|---|
| Alexei Kosygin; CPSU | Alexei Kosygin; CPSU |

Supreme Soviet elections were held in the Soviet Union on 16 June 1974.

== Electoral system ==
Candidates had to be nominated by the Communist Party of the Soviet Union (CPSU) or by a public organisation. However, all public organisations were controlled by the party and were subservient to a 1931 law that required them to accept party rule. The CPSU itself remained the only legal one in the country.

Voters could vote against the CPSU candidate, but could only do so by using polling booths, whereas votes for the party could be cast simply by submitting a blank ballot. Turnout was required to be over 50% for the election to be valid.

The 1974 elections were the last held under the 1936 Soviet constitution, which provided for a Supreme Soviet elected for a four-year term and mandated that the Soviet of the Union had one deputy for every 300,000 people. During the Supreme Soviet's term, a new constitution was passed in 1977, which extended the Supreme Soviet's term to five years and made the number of seats in the Soviet of the Union equal to that of the Soviet of Nationalities, regardless of population size. Consequently, the term of the Supreme Soviet elected in 1974 was extended by a year, from 1978 to 1979; however, the new composition of the Supreme Soviet, with an equal number of members in each house, was only implemented starting with the 1979 elections.

== Candidates ==
CPSU candidates accounted for around three quarters of the nominees, whilst many of the others were members of Komsomol.

== Results ==
=== Soviet of the Union ===
| Party | Votes | % | Seats | +/– |
|---|---|---|---|---|
| Communist Party of the Soviet Union | 161,355,959 | 99.79 | 562 | 0 |
| Independents | 161,355,959 | 99.79 | 205 | 0 |
| Against | 333,569 | 0.21 | – | – |
| Total | 161,689,528 | 100.00 | 767 | 0 |
| Valid votes | 161,689,528 | 100.00 | | |
| Invalid/blank votes | 84 | 0.00 | | |
| Total votes | 161,689,612 | 100.00 | | |
| Registered voters/turnout | 161,724,222 | 99.98 | | |
Source: Nohlen & Stöver

=== Soviet of Nationalities ===
| Party | Votes | % | Seats | +/– |
|---|---|---|---|---|
| Communist Party of the Soviet Union | 161,443,605 | 99.85 | 534 | 0 |
| Independents | 161,443,605 | 99.85 | 216 | 0 |
| Against | 245,918 | 0.15 | – | – |
| Total | 161,689,523 | 100.00 | 750 | 0 |
| Valid votes | 161,689,523 | 100.00 | | |
| Invalid/blank votes | 89 | 0.00 | | |
| Total votes | 161,689,612 | 100.00 | | |
| Registered voters/turnout | 161,724,222 | 99.98 | | |
Source: Nohlen & Stöver
