= Ministry of Power Stations =

Government ministry of the Soviet Union

The Ministry of Electric Power Stations (Russian: Министерство электростанций СССР) was a government ministry in the Soviet Union.

== History ==
The People's Commissariat of Electric Power Stations and Electrical Industry USSR was one of six people's commissariats created from the division of the People's Commissariat of Heavy Industry USSR by ukase of the Presidium Supreme Soviet USSR of 24 January 1939.

Ukases of the Presidium, Supreme Soviet USSR, of 7 April 1940, reorganized the People's Commissariat of Electric Power Stations and Electrical Industry USSR into the People's Commissariat of Electric Power Stations USSR and established the People's Commissariat of Electrical Industry USSR. The first of the two ukases placed all rayon steam electric power stations, hydroelectric power stations, electric power networks, heating networks, and the construction of rayon electric power stations under the jurisdiction of the new People's Commissariat of Electric Power Stations USSR. Also, peat enterprises and organizations serving rayon power stations were transferred from the People's Commissariat of Local Fuel Industry RSFSR to the People's Commissariat of Electric Power Stations USSR.

On 15 March 1946, the People's Commissariat of Electric Power Stations USSR was renamed the Ministry of Electric Power Stations USSR.

== List of ministers ==
- Mikhail Pervukhin (26.1.1939 - 17.4.1940)
- Andrei Letkov (17.4.1940 - 15.3.1953)
- Mikhail Pervukhin (15.3.1953 - 17.4.1954)
- Aleksei Pavlenko (17.4.1954 - 8.2.1955)
- Georgi Malenkov (9.2.1955 - 4.7.1957)
- Aleksei Pavlenko (4.7.1957 - 31.12.1958)
