= Nikolai Martynov (politician) =

Belarusian politician (born 1957)

Nikolai Martynov is a Belarusian businessman and entrepreneur, who founded and owns the company Marko.

He was born on August 1, 1957, in the village of Gudovo. He graduated from the Institute of Political Science and Social Administration of the Communist Party of Belarus, later on being elected to the Council of the Republic of the National Assembly of the Republic of Belarus, specifically a member of the Economy, Budget and Finances Commission. In May 2019, he carried the Flame of Peace torch relay of the 2nd European Games, and in March 2021, he joined a commission for the amendment of the Belarusian constitution.
