= Nikolai Maltsev =

Russian futsal player (born 1986)

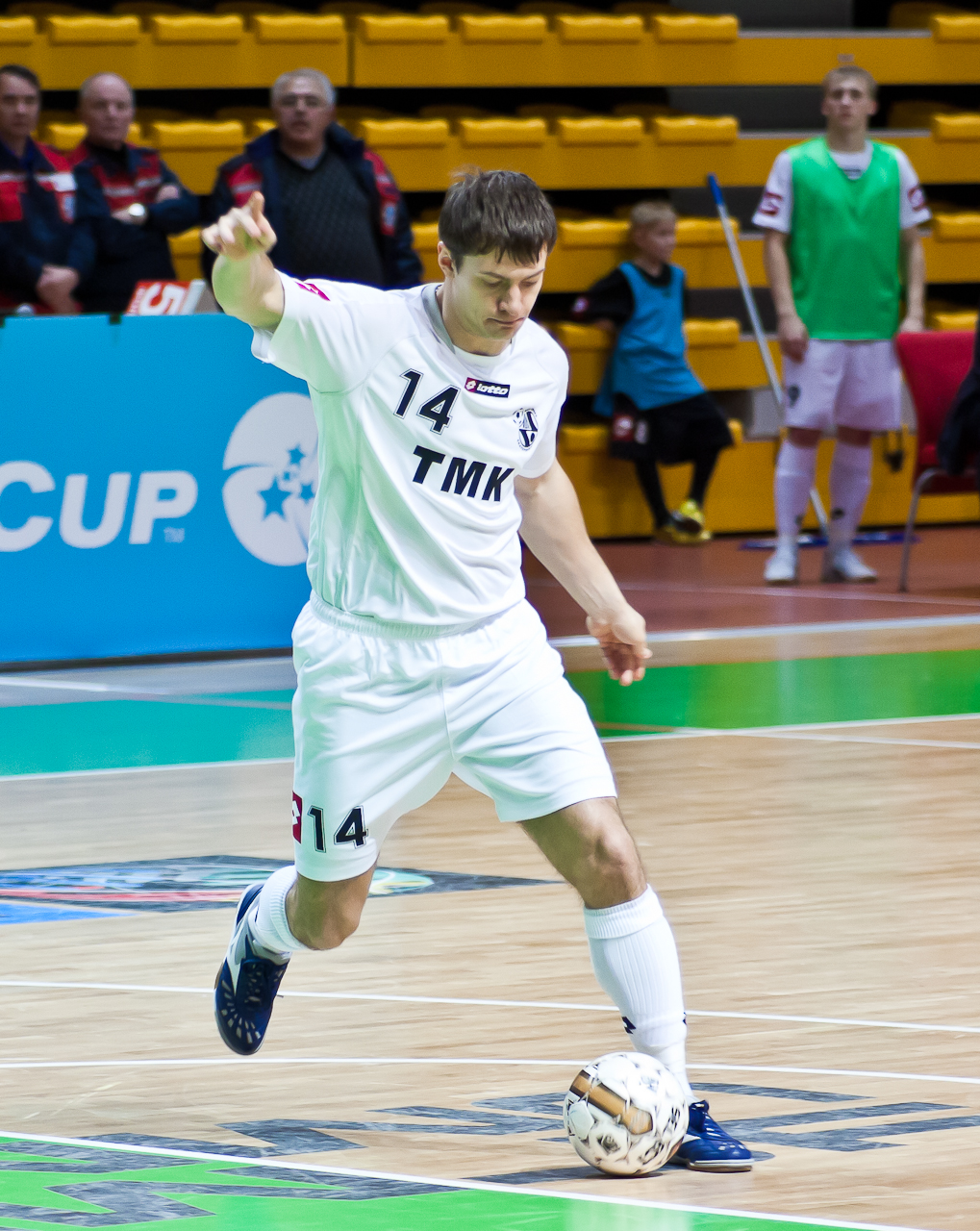

Personal information
- Date of birth: 15 April 1986 (age 40)
- Place of birth: Beloyarsky, Soviet Union
- Height: 1.70 m (5 ft 7 in)
- Position: Ala

Team information
- Current team: Viz-Sinara

Senior career*
Years	Team	Apps	(Gls)
2003–2005	Viz-Sinara		
2005–2006	Tyumen		
2006–2008	Aktobe BTA		
2008–2009	Mytischi		
2009	Dinamo Yamal		
2010	Dinamo-2 Moscow		
2010–	Viz-Sinara		

International career
–	Russia		
- * Club domestic league appearances and goals

Nikolai Maltsev (born 15 April 1986) is a Russian futsal player who plays for Viz-Sinara and the Russian national futsal team.
