= Valentin Shashin =

Soviet politician (1916–1977)

Minister of Oil Industry
- In office 1965 – March 1977
- Premier: Alexei Kosygin
- Succeeded by: Nikolai Maltsev

Personal details
- Born: Valentin Dmitrievich Shashin; 1916 Baku, Russian Empire
- Died: March 1977 (aged 60–61)
- Party: Communist Party
- Education: Moscow Oil Institute

Valentin Shashin (Russian: Валентин Шашин; 1916–1977) was a Soviet engineer who served as the minister of oil industry for more than a decade, 1965–1977.

== Biography ==
Shashin was born in Baku in 1916. He was first educated at the Oil and Gas Training College. He graduated from Moscow Oil Institute in 1943 obtaining a degree in oil and gas engineering. While attending the Institute Shashin participated in the defense of Moscow against Nazi Germany. From 1947 to 1953 he worked as a chief engineer in various gas fields in Bashkiria. Next he headed a state-run oil company, Tatneft, between 1960 and 1965. Shashin was appointed minister of oil producing industry in 1965 when the ministry was established. In the 1970s the ministry was renamed as ministry of oil industry.

Shashin died in March 1977 while serving as the minister of oil industry. He was succeeded by Nikolai A. Maltsev, who was appointed to the post in April 1977.
