= Konstantin Rudnev =

Soviet politician and civil servant (1911–1980)

Minister of Instrument Making, Automated Equipment, and Control Systems
- In office October 1965 – 13 August 1980

Deputy Premier of the Soviet Union
- In office June 1961 – October 1965

Chairman of the State Committee for Defense Technology
- In office 31 March 1958 – 10 June 1961
- Preceded by: Aleksandr Domrachyov
- Succeeded by: Leonid Smirnov

Personal details
- Born: Konstantin Nikolaevich Rudnev; 22 June 1911 Tula, Russian Empire
- Died: 13 August 1980 (aged 69) Moscow, Russian SFSR, Soviet Union
- Resting place: Novodevichy Cemetery
- Party: Communist Party of the Soviet Union
- Education: Tula Mechanical Institute

Photograph of Konstantin Rudnev (left), Valentina Tereshkova, and Valery Bykovsky on June 29th, 1963

Konstantin Nikolaevich Rudnev (Russian: Константин Николаевич Руднев; 22 June 1911–13 August 1980) was a Soviet politician who held various cabinet and public posts. He was the long-term minister of instrument making, automated equipment, and control systems between 1965 and 1980. He played a significant role in the Soviet missile and space programs.

== Early life and education ==
Rudnev was born in Tula on 22 June 1911. He graduated from Tula Mechanics Institute in 1935.

== Career ==
In 1940 Rudnev joined the Communist Party. During World War II he served as the director of a munitions plant. On 8 August 1950 he was named as the head of a science and research institute, NII 88, replacing Major General Lev R. Gonor in the post. In May 1952 Rudnev was appointed deputy minister of armaments under Dmitry Ustinov. The Ministry of Defense was renamed as the State Committee for Defense Technology in May 1958, and Rudnev was named as its chairman.

In 1961 Rudnev became a member of the central committee of the Communist Party. In June 1961 he was appointed deputy premier responsible for research activities which he held until October 1965. Next he was appointed minister of instrument making, automated equipment, and control systems in October 1965. He held the post until his death in August 1980.

== Connection to Gagarin ==
Rudnev was the chairman of the state commission responsible for launching the Vostok spacecraft with a human on board. The day after Yuri Gagarin completed the world’s first human spaceflight, he presented Rudnev with an issue of Pravda dated 13 April 1961 containing the TASS report on the flight, inscribed: “To the supervisor from the performer. Gagarin.”

In a conversation with Gagarin after his landing, Rudnev joked: “Well, you and I are practically countrymen. You graduated from the Orenburg Flight School, and I worked in the Orenburg region during the war.”

== Death ==
Rudnev died in Moscow on 13 August 1980 while serving as the minister. He was buried in the Novodevichy Cemetery.

== Awards ==
Rudnev received the following awards:

- Hero of Socialist Labour (17 June 1961)
- Six Orders of Lenin (5 August 1944, 20 April 1956, 21 December 1957, 17 June 1961, 2 July 1966, 21 June 1971)
- Order of the October Revolution (12 March 1976)
- Order of the Patriotic War, 2nd class (16 September 1945)
- Two Orders of the Red Banner of Labour (3 June 1942, 1949)
- Medal "For Labour Valour" (8 June 1939)
