= Ministry of Communication Equipment Industry (Soviet Union) =

Ministry of Communications Equipment Industry
- Министерство промышленности средств связи СССР
- All ministry seals of the Soviet Union used the Soviet coat of arms

Agency overview
- Formed: 1946
- Preceding agency: 5th Main Directorate of the People's Commissariat of Defense Industry of the USSR (1937–1940) People's Commissariat of Electrical Industry of the USSR (1940–1946)
- Dissolved: 1989
- Superseding agency: Ministry of Communications
- Jurisdiction: Government of the Soviet Union
- Headquarters: Moscow, Russian SFSR, Soviet Union

The Ministry of Communications Equipment Industry (MPSS; Russian: Министерство промышленности средств связи СССР) was a government ministry in the Soviet Union.

== History ==
By ukase of the Presidium of the Supreme Soviet of 28 June 1946, the Ministry of Electrical Industry was divided into the Ministry of Electrical Industry and the Ministry of Communications Equipment Industry. The Ministry of Communications Equipment Industry was given jurisdiction over enterprises and organizations producing radar, radio engineering, and telephone and telegraph equipment, vacuum tubes, storage batteries, battery cells and carbon electrical products.

The ministry was re-established on 30 March 1974; had overall responsibility for production of communication equipment (including radio and television, telegraph and telephone, and satellite communications equipment), and for overall construction of a country-wide unified communications network.

== List of ministers ==
- Erien Pervyshin (11.4.1974 - 17.7.1989)
