= Ministry of the Medical Industry =

Government ministry of the Soviet Union

The Ministry of Medical Industry (Minmedprom; Russian: Министерство медицинской промышленности СССР) was a government ministry in the Soviet Union.

== History ==
The Ministry of Medical Industry USSR existed from 14 June 1946 to 1 March 1948. The law which established it stated that it was to be "formed on a basis of enterprises of the chemical-pharmaceutical industry, the medical instrument industry, and the prosthetic industry of the Ministry of Health USSR, the union-republic ministries of health, and the union-republic ministries of social security." Enterprises and organizations were transferred to it "according to a list confirmed by the Council of Ministers USSR."

== List of ministers ==
- Andrei Tretyakov (14.6.1946 - 1.3.1948)
- Pyotr Gusenko (25.4.1967 - 28.1.1975)
- Afanasi Melnitshenko (23.5.1975 - 22.11.1985)
- Valery Bykov (22.11.1985 - 24.8.1991)
