= Leonid Smirnov (politician) =

Soviet civil servant (1916–2001)

- Леонид Смирнов

Deputy Premier of the Soviet Union
- In office 16 March 1963 – 15 November 1985
- Premier: Alexey Kosygin; Nikolai Tikhonov
- Preceded by: Dmitry Ustinov
- Succeeded by: Yuri Maslyukov

Chairman of the State Committee for Defense Technology
- In office 10 June 1961 – 13 March 1963
- Premier: Alexey Kosygin
- Preceded by: Konstantin Rudnev
- Succeeded by: Sergei Zverev

Personal details
- Born: 16 April 1916 Kuznetsk
- Died: 21 December 2001 (aged 85) Moscow, Russia
- Party: Communist Party of the Soviet Union
- Education: Novocherkassk Industrial Institute

Leonid Vasilyevich Smirnov (Russian: Леонид Васильевич Смирнов; 16 April 1916 – 21 December 2001) was a Soviet statesman. He served as a director of the missile factory at Dnipropetrovsk in the late 1950s, developing strategic missiles for the USSR's defense. In March 1963 he became Deputy Chairman of the Council of Ministers, reporting to Minister of Defence Dmitry Ustinov.

== Early life ==
Smirnov was born in Kuznetsk to a worker's family. He began his working life as an electrician in 1930 in Rostov-on-Don.

He studied at the Novocherkassk Industrial Institute from 1933 to 1934 and graduated in 1939. Whilst studying, he worked from 1933 to 1930 in Novocherkassk, first as a duty electrician and then as an electrical engineering inspector.

== Ministry of Armaments of the USSR ==
Smirnov worked for the Ministry of Armaments of the USSR from 1939 to 1961:

- Between 1939 and 1948, he rose from deputy head of production, to deputy chief of power, to being head of the Novocherkassk steam electric power plant. Smirnov became a member of the communist party in 1943.
- From 1948 to 1949 he was at the Industry Academy of the Ministry of Armaments.
- From 1949 to 1951 he was director of the Central Research Institute of Automatics and Hydraulics of the Ministry of Armaments.
- From 1951 to 1952 he was head of rocket and space technology weapons of the Ministry of Armaments.
- From 1952 to March 1961 he was director of the Dnipropetrovsk Machine-Building Factory (Factory-586) - now called Pivdenmash. This enterprise started work on mass production of strategic military missiles in 1951, Once Smirnov was appointed in 1952, the factory began an active and hard work on the creation of 'vertical takeoff vehicles'. The first rockets completed were R-1 missiles assembled from components from other factories. But by November 1952 they were being mass-produced using components they made themselves. In 1953, the factory produced its first batch of liquid fuel rocket engines for anti-aircraft missiles, and completed the first fire tests of the engine. The factory was responsible for the beginning of series production of the R-12 missile; this was the missile used in the Cuban Missile Crisis. On 10 July 1959 the factory was awarded the Order of Lenin for creating the R-12 missile. The first successful launch of the R-16 intercontinental ballistic missile took place on 2 February 1961. The factory did not just make missiles. It also made tractors; in 1954 for example it produced 6,500. It played an important role in the life of Dnipropetrovsk; for example in 1957, it opened the Palace of Culture.

== Central government of the USSR ==
- From 1957 to 1961, he was head of the Central Board of the State Committee for Defense Technology.
- In March 1961 Smirnov became deputy chairman of the State Committee of the Council of Ministers of the USSR for Defence Technology (GKOT);
- From 10 June 1961 to 13 March 1963 Smirnov was chairman of State Committee of the Council of Ministers of the USSR for Defence Technology with the rank of minister of the USSR.
- From 31 October 1961 to 25 February 1986 Smirnov was a member of the Central Committee of the Communist Party of the Soviet Union.
- From 13 March 1963 to 15 November 1985 he was deputy chairman of the Council of Ministers of the USSR.

As deputy chairman of the Council of Ministers, he was chairman of the Military Industrial Commission (VPK), reporting to Minister of Defence Dmitry Ustinov.

Smirnov retired in November 1985.

== Party congresses of the CPSU ==
He was a delegate to the following:

- 20th Congress of the Communist Party of the Soviet Union in 1956.
- 22nd Congress of the Communist Party of the Soviet Union in 1961.
- 23rd Congress of the Communist Party of the Soviet Union in 1966.
- 24th Congress of the Communist Party of the Soviet Union in 1971.
- 25th Congress of the Communist Party of the Soviet Union in 1976.
- 26th Congress of the Communist Party of the Soviet Union in 1981.

He was a deputy to the 6th-9th convocations of the Supreme Soviet of the Soviet Union.

== Awards ==
Smirnov was made twice a Hero of Socialist Labour, and awarded the Lenin Prize in 1960, six Orders of Lenin, Order of the Red Banner of Labour, Order of the Red Star, and various medals.
