= Ministry of Transport Construction =

Government ministry of the Soviet Union

The Ministry of Transport Construction (Mintransstroy; Russian: Министерство транспортного строительства СССР) was a government ministry in the Soviet Union.

Originally established in 1954 as Ministry of Transport Construction as the successor to the Main Administration for the Construction of Highways; renamed State Production Committee for Transport Construction in 1957 and renamed Ministry of Transport Construction in 1965. Responsible for overseeing the construction of railroads, large bridges, tunnels and subways in seaports and river ports, construction of national highways and airfields.

== List of ministers ==
- Yevgeni Kozhevnikov (8.2.1955 - 10.5.1957; 2.10.1965 - 5.3.1975)
- Ivan Sosnov (5.3.1975 - 8.5.1985)
- Vladimir Brezhnev (8.5.1985 - 24.8.1991)
