= Ministry of Installation and Special Construction Works =

Government ministry of the Soviet Union

The Ministry of Assembly and Special Construction Works (Minmontazhspetsstroy; Russian: Министерство монтажных и специальных строительных работ СССР) was a government ministry in the Soviet Union.

Originally established in 1963 as the State Production Committee for Installation and Special Construction Work; renamed Ministry of Installation and Special Construction Work in 1965.

After the Dissolution of the Soviet Union the ministry was abolished and its successor has become the state corporation Montazhspetsstroy, which in 1992 was reorganized into the OJSC "Corporation 'Montazhspetsstroy'".

== List of ministers ==
- Fuad Yakubovsky (2.10.1965 - 27.3.1975)
- Boris Bakin (22.5.1975 - 17.7.1989)
- Aleksandr Mikhalchenko (17.7.1989 - 24.8.1991)
