= Ministry of Construction and Road-Machine Building =

Government ministry of the Soviet Union

The Ministry of Construction and Road-Machine Building (Minstroydormash; Russian: Министерство строительного и дорожного машиностроения СССР) was a government ministry in the Soviet Union.

The People's Commissariat of Construction- and Road-Machine Building was established by a ukase of the Presidium Supreme Soviet USSR of 17 February 1946. In March 1946, the people's commissariat became the Ministry of Construction- and Road-Machine Building.

== List of ministers ==
- Konstantin Sokolov (17 February 1946 - 2 June 1949)
- Semjon Fomin (2 June 1949 - 5 March 1953)
- Jefim Novosjelov (19 April 1954 - 10 May 1957; 2 October 1965 - 2 December 1980)
- Vitali Chudin (2 December 1980 - 2 August 1985)
- Jevgeni Varnachev (2 August 1985 - 17 July 1989)
