= Ministry of the Electronics Industry (Soviet Union) =

Soviet government agency

The Ministry of the Electronics Industry (Minelektronprom; Russian: Министерство электронной промышленности, MEI) was a government ministry in the Soviet Union.

Established in 1961 as State Committee for Electronics Technology, it became a ministry in 1965. Its primary responsibility is for research, development, and production of electronic and electrical devices, including solid-state and miniature electronic components and devices. The Ministry of the Electronics Industry was the monopolistic producer of electronic components for military and civilian applications in the Soviet Union. It produced a wide variety of electronic appliances, most of them under the Electronika brand. MEI role as a political body was mostly replaced by a state-owned Rostec which was founded in 2007.

== List of ministers ==
- Alexander S. Shokin (2.10.1965 - 18.11.1985)
- Vladislav Kolesnikov (18.11.1985 - 24.8.1991)

== Industry ==
There was a range of different organizations, companies, and research centers during soviet times that were directly subjected to the ministry with many being active by the end of 2010, including:

- SPA «Scientific center»
  - Moscow/Zelenograd based:
    - Angstrem (company)
    - Mikron Group
    - LLC «Quant»
  - NPP Istok
  - Integral (based in Minsk, Belarus)

Kazan, Tatarstan Republic:

- Ltd Elecon

Others:

- Plant of Radio Measurement Devices (Vilnius)
- Alpha (Latvia)
- Connector Plant (Ukraine)
- Elta Plant (Elets, Russia) (produced cathode ray tubes)
- Ritm Plant (Belgorod, Russia)
- Smolensk plant of radio components (Smolensk, Russia)
- Photon (Tashkent, Uzbekistan)
- Quartz Corp. (Kaliningrad, Russia)
- Donskoi plant of radio components (Tula, Russia)
- SPA Pozitron (Saint-Petersburg, Russia)
