= Ministry of Electrical Equipment Industry =

The Ministry of the Electrical Equipment Industry (Minelektrotekhprom; Russian: Министерство электротехнической промышленности СССР) was a government ministry in the Soviet Union.

Established in 1954; disestablished in 1957 and reestablished as State Committee in 1962 and as Ministry in 1965; responsible for the development and production of electrical cable, storage batteries, lighting equipment, electrical motors, generators, transformers, and high voltage electrical distribution apparatus.

== List of ministers ==
- Aleksei Antonov (2.10.1965 - 20.12.1980)
- Anatoli Mayorets (20.12.1980 - 8.5.1985)
- Gennadi Voronovski (8.5.1985 - 20.7.1986)
- Oleg Anfimov (20.7.1986 - 24.8.1991)
