= Leonid Kostandov =

Soviet politician (1928–2005)

Deputy Premier of the Soviet Union
- In office February 1980 – 5 September 1984
- Premier: Nikolai Ryzhkov

Minister of the Chemical Industry
- In office October 1965 – 1980

Personal details
- Born: Leonid Arkadevich Kostandov; 27 November 1915 Kerki, Turkmenistan, Russian Empire
- Died: 5 September 1984 (aged 68) Leipzig, East Germany
- Resting place: Kremlin Wall Necropolis, Moscow
- Party: Communist Party
- Education: Moscow Institute of Chemical Engineering

Leonid Kostandov (Russian: Леонид Костандов; 27 November 1915 – 5 September 1984) was a Soviet engineer and politician who served as the minister of the chemical industry between 1965 and 1980 and as the deputy premier from 1980 to his death.

== Biography ==
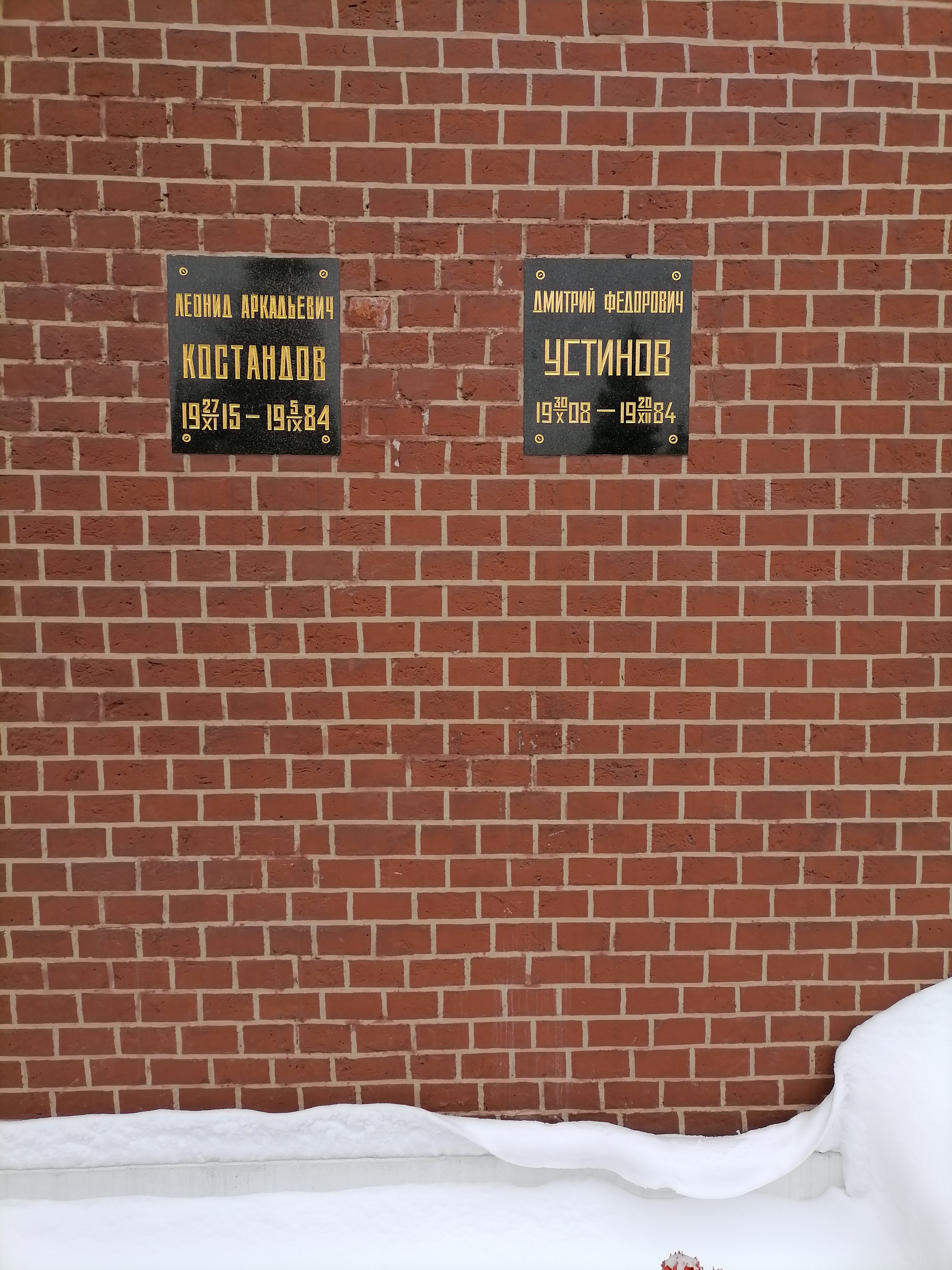
Kostandov's grave sign in Kremlin Wall Necropolis next to that of Dmitriy Ustinov

Being a native of Kerki, Turkmenistan, Kostandov was born on 27 November 1915 into an ethnic Armenian family. He started his career in a local cotton gin, and then he worked in a silk-weaving mill in 1930. He graduated from the Moscow Institute of Chemical Engineering in 1940. He joined the Communist Party of the Soviet Union in 1942. Following his graduation he began to work as a manager in a chemical plant in Chirchik. In 1951 he was awarded a Stalin Prize. He was appointed to the central administration of the chemical industry in Moscow in 1953. From 1963 to 1964, he was chairman of the State Committee for Chemical and Oil-Refining Machine-Building. He was named as the minister of the chemical industry in October 1965 and remained in the post in 1980. The same year he was appointed deputy prime minister responsible for chemical and related industries.

Kostandov was a close friend of Armand Hammer and, in 1981 following US President Ronald Reagan lifting the United States agricultural embargo against the Soviet Union on 25 April 1981, assisted the David Murdoch and Occidental Petroleum controlled Iowa Beef Processors (IBP), which was the biggest and most advanced beef-packer in the world, to gain access to the Soviet market for IBP's United States beef.

Kostandov died of a heart attack on 5 September 1984 while he was visiting a fair in Leipzig, East Germany. He was buried in the Kremlin Wall Necropolis after the official funeral ceremony held in Red Square, Moscow.
