= Ministry of Instrumentation, Automation and Control Systems =

The Ministry of Instrument-Making, Automation Devices and Control Systems (Minpribor; Russian: Министерство приборостроения, средств автоматизации и систем управления) was a government ministry in the Soviet Union.

Established in 1959 as State Committee for Automation and Machine Building; it assumed its ministerial title in 1965; oversees development and integration into industry of automated control systems. The ministry developed and manufactured systems for industrial control, planning and management.

== List of ministers ==
- Konstantin Rudnev (2 October 1965 – 19 April 1979)
- Anatoli Kostousov (26 July 1974 – 19 April 1979)
- Konstantin Rudnev (19 April 1979 – 1 July 1980)
- Mikhail Shkabardnya (10 September 1980 – 17 July 1989)
