= Ministry of the Gas Industry =

Government ministry of the Soviet Union

The Ministry of the Gas Industry (Mingazprom; Russian: Министерство газовой промышленности СССР) was a government ministry in the Soviet Union responsible for the Soviet oil industry and related sectors.

It was created in 1957 as the Main Administration for the Gas Industry; renamed State Production Committee for the Gas Industry in 1963. It received its ministerial title in 1965. In 1989 Gazprom was established as a successor to the ministry. After the collapse of the Soviet Union in 1991, assets outside of Russia were transferred to national companies such as Ukrgazprom and Turkmengazprom.

== List of ministers ==
- Aleksei Kortunov (2 October 1965 – 20 September 1972)
- Sabit Orujov (20 September 1972 – 10 May 1981)
- Vasili Dinkov (10 May 1981 – 13 February 1985)
- Viktor Chernomyrdin (13 February 1985 – 17 July 1989)
