= Ministry of Light Industry =

Government ministry of the Soviet Union

The Ministry of Light Industry (Russian: Министерство лёгкой промышленности), also known as Minlegprom, was a government ministry in the Soviet Union which was responsible for consumer goods production.

== History ==
The People's Commissariat of Light Industry (NKIP SSSR) was established by decree of the Central Executive Committee and the Council of People's Commissars USSR on 5 January 1932. It was reorganized by the Stalin Constitution of 1936 into a union-republic commissariat. The Central Executive Committee and the Council of People's Commissars USSR confirmed the formation of union-republic commissariats of light industry in the RSFSR and the Ukraine on 19 September 1936.

People's Commissariats of Light Industry (NKLP) were set up in the remaining union republics by the government decrees of 22 December 1936 and 3, 8, 10, and ll January 1937. On 2 January 1939 the NKIP SSSR was divided into the NKTP SSSR (People's Commissariat of Textile Industry USSR) and the NKLP SSSR.

When on 15 March 1946 all people's commissariats became ministries, the NKTP SSSR and the NKLP USSR became the Ministry of Textile Industry USSR and the Ministry of Light Industry USSR, respectively. These two Ministries were reunited into the Ministry of Light Industry USSR by ukase of the Presidium of the Supreme Soviet USSR on 28 December 1948.

== List of ministers ==
- Isidor Lyubimov (5.1.1932 - 7.9.1937)
- Vasili Shestakov (8.9.1937 - 1.1.1938)
- Sergei Lukin (2.1.1939 - 11.6.1947)
- Nikolai Tshesnokov (11.6.1947 - 28.12.1948)
- Alexei Kosygin (28.12.1948 - 24.8.1953)
- Nikolai Mirovortsev (22.9.1955 - 31.5.1956)
- Nikita Ryzhov (31.5.1956 - 22.2.1957)
- Nikolai Tarasov (2.10.1965 - 6.7.1985)
- Vladimir Klyuyev (6.7.1985 - 14.4.1989)

== See also ==
- Consumer goods in the Soviet Union
