= Foreign relations of the Soviet Union =

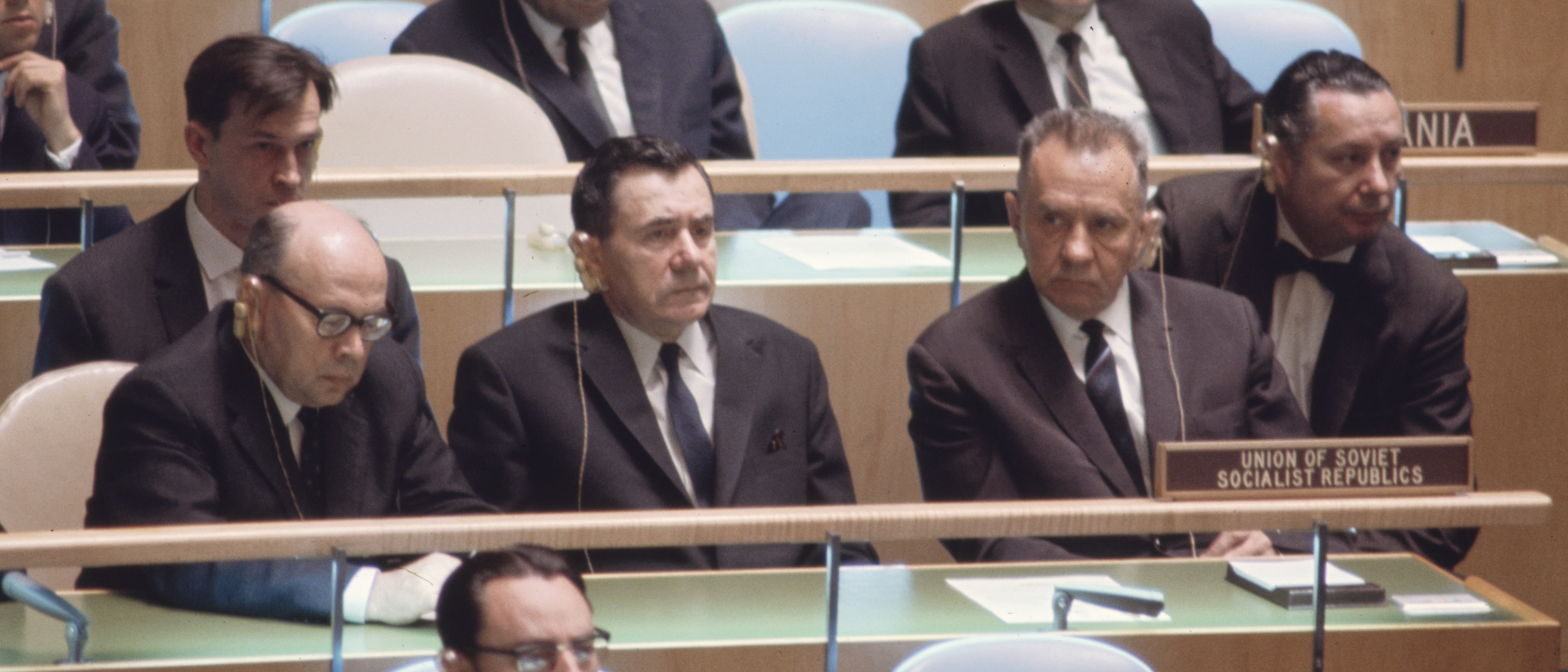
The Soviet delegation to the United Nations c. 1964–1980. Andrei Gromyko and Alexei Kosygin are second and third from left, respectively.

After the Russian Revolution, in which the Bolsheviks took over parts of the collapsing Russian Empire in 1918, they faced enormous odds against the German Empire and eventually negotiated terms to pull out of World War I. They then went to war against the White movement, pro-independence movements, rebellious peasants, former supporters, anarchists and foreign interventionists in the bitter civil war. They set up the Soviet Union in 1922, with Vladimir Lenin in charge. At first, it was treated as an unrecognized pariah state because of its repudiating of tsarist debts and threats to destroy capitalism at home and around the world. By 1922, Moscow had repudiated the goal of world revolution, and sought diplomatic recognition and friendly trade relations with the capitalist world, starting with Britain and Germany. Finally, in 1933, the United States gave recognition. Trade and technical help from Germany and the United States arrived in the late 1920s. After Lenin died in 1924, Joseph Stalin, became leader. He transformed the country in the 1930s into an industrial and military power. Publicly, it strongly opposed Nazi Germany until August 1939, when it came to temporary peaceful terms with Berlin in the Molotov–Ribbentrop Pact. Moscow and Berlin by agreement invaded and partitioned Poland and the Baltic States. The non-aggression pact was broken in June 1941 when Nazi Germany invaded the Soviet Union. The Soviet forces nearly collapsed as the Germans reached the outskirts of Leningrad and Moscow. However, the Soviet Union proved strong enough to defeat Nazi Germany, with help from its key World War II allies, Britain and the United States. The Soviet army occupied most of Eastern Europe (except Yugoslavia) and increasingly controlled the governments.

In 1945, the USSR became one of the five permanent members of the United Nations Security Council along with the United States, Britain, France, and China, giving it the right to veto any Security Council resolutions (see Soviet Union and the United Nations). By 1947, American and European anger at Soviet military occupation of the Eastern European states led to a Cold War, with Western Europe rebuilt economically with the help of the Marshall Plan from Washington. Opposition to the danger of Soviet expansion formed the basis of the NATO military alliance in 1949. There was no hot war, but the Cold War was fought diplomatically and politically across the world by the Soviet and NATO blocks.

The Kremlin controlled the satellite states that it established in the parts of Eastern Europe its army occupied in 1945. After eliminating all opposition and purging the leadership, it linked them to the USSR in terms of economics through Comecon and later the military through the Warsaw Pact. In 1948, relations with Yugoslavia disintegrated over mutual distrust between Stalin and Tito. A similar split happened with Albania in 1955. Like Yugoslavia and Albania, China was never controlled by the Soviet Army. The Kremlin wavered between the two factions fighting the Chinese Civil War, but ultimately supported the winner, Mao Zedong. Stalin and Mao both supported North Korea in its invasion of South Korea in 1950. But the United States and the United Nations mobilized the counterforce in the Korean War (1950–1953). Moscow provided air support but no ground troops; China sent in its large army that eventually stalemated the war. By 1960, disagreements between Beijing and Moscow had escalated out of control, and the two nations became bitter enemies in the contest for control of worldwide communist activities.

Tensions between the Soviet Union and the United States reached an all-time high during the 1962 Cuban Missile Crisis, in which Soviet missiles were placed on the island of Cuba well within range of US territory. This was retrospectively viewed as the closest the world ever came to a nuclear war. After the crisis was resolved, relations with the United States gradually eased into the 1970s, reaching a degree of détente as both Moscow and Beijing sought American favor.

In 1979, a communist government was installed by the USSR in Afghanistan, but was hard-pressed and requested military help from Moscow. The Soviet army intervened to support the regime, but found itself in a major confrontation. The presidency of Ronald Reagan in the United States was marked by opposition to the Soviet Union, and mobilized its allies to support the guerrilla war against the Soviets in Afghanistan. The goal was to create something akin to the Vietnam War, which would drain Soviet forces and morale. When Mikhail Gorbachev became the leader of the Soviet Union in 1985, he sought to restructure the Soviet Union to resemble the Scandinavian model of western social democracy and thus create a private sector economy. He withdrew Soviet troops from Afghanistan in 1989 and began a hands-off approach in the USSR's relations with its Eastern European satellites. This was well received by the United States, but it led to the breakaway of the Eastern European satellites in 1989, and the final collapse and dissolution of the USSR in 1991. The new Russia, under Boris Yeltsin, succeeded the Soviet Union.

The Ministry of Foreign Affairs implemented the foreign policies set by Stalin and after his death by the Politburo. Andrei Gromyko served as the Minister of Foreign Affairs for nearly thirty years (1957–1985), being the longest-serving foreign minister in the world.

== Ideology and objectives of Soviet foreign policy ==
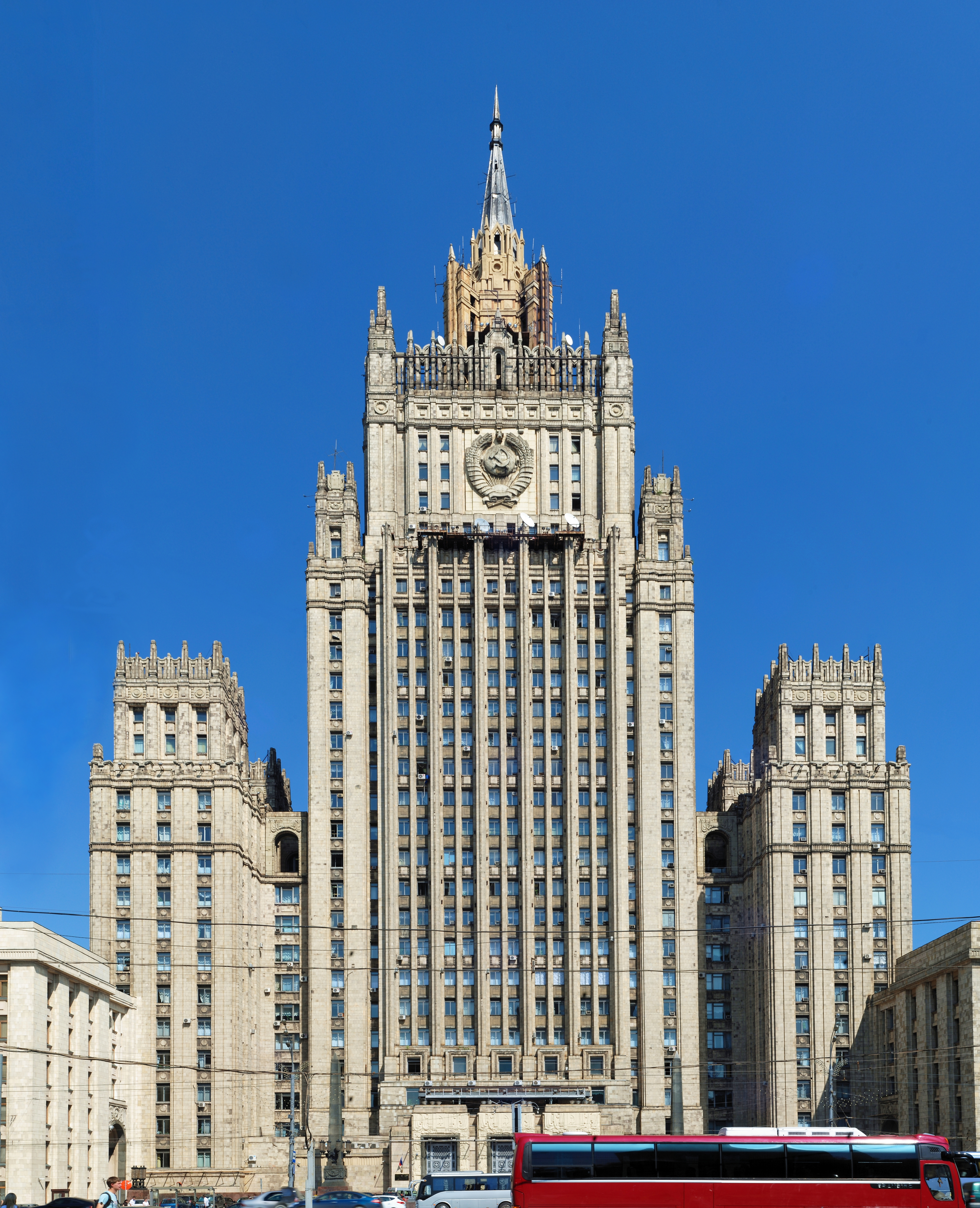
Ministry of Foreign Affairs main building, completed in 1953

According to Soviet Marxist–Leninist theorists, the basic character of Soviet foreign policy was set forth in Vladimir Lenin's Decree on Peace, adopted by the Second Congress of Soviets in November 1917. It set forth the dual nature of Soviet foreign policy, which encompasses both proletarian internationalism and peaceful coexistence. On the one hand, proletarian internationalism refers to the common cause of the working class (or the proletariat) of all countries in struggling to overthrow the bourgeoisie and to start a communist revolution. Peaceful coexistence, on the other hand, refers to measures to ensure relatively peaceful government-to-government relations with capitalist states. Both policies can be pursued simultaneously: "Peaceful coexistence does not rule out but presupposes determined opposition to imperialist aggression and support for peoples defending their revolutionary gains or fighting foreign oppression."

The Soviet commitment in practice to proletarian internationalism declined since the founding of the Soviet state, although this component of ideology still had some effect on later formulation and execution of Soviet foreign policy. Although pragmatic raisons d'état undoubtedly accounted for much of more recent Soviet foreign policy, the ideology of class struggle still played a role in providing a worldview and certain loose guidelines for action in the 1980s. Marxist–Leninist ideology reinforces other characteristics of political culture that create an attitude of competition and conflict with other states.

The general foreign policy goals of the Soviet Union were formalized in a party program ratified by delegates to the Twenty-Seventh Party Congress in February–March 1986. According to the programme, "the main goals and guidelines of the CPSU's international policy" included ensuring favorable external conditions conducive to building communism in the Soviet Union; eliminating the threat of world war; disarmament; strengthening the world socialist system; developing equal and friendly relations with liberated (third world) countries; peaceful coexistence with the capitalist countries; and solidarity with communist and revolutionary-democratic parties, the international workers' movement, and national liberation struggles.

Although these general foreign policy goals were apparently conceived in terms of priorities, the emphasis and ranking of the priorities have changed over time in response to domestic and international stimuli. After Mikhail Gorbachev became General Secretary of the Communist Party in 1985, for instance, some Western analysts discerned in the ranking of priorities a possible de-emphasis of Soviet support for national liberation movements. Although the emphasis and ranking of priorities were subject to change, two basic goals of Soviet foreign policy remained constant: national security (safeguarding Communist Party rule through internal control and the maintenance of adequate military forces) and, since the late 1940s, influence over Eastern Europe.

Many Western analysts have examined the way Soviet behavior in various regions and countries supported the general goals of Soviet foreign policy. These analysts have assessed Soviet behavior in the 1970s and 1980s as placing primary emphasis on relations with the United States, which was considered the foremost threat to the national security of the Soviet Union. Second priority was given to relations with Eastern Europe (the other members of the Warsaw Pact) and Western Europe (the European members of the North Atlantic Treaty Organization). Third priority was given to the littoral or propinquitous states along the southern border of the Soviet Union: Turkey (a NATO member), Iran, Afghanistan, China, Mongolia, North Korea, and Japan. Regions near to, but not bordering, the Soviet Union were assigned fourth priority. These included the Middle East, South Asia, and Southeast Asia. Last priority was given to Africa, Oceania, and Latin America, except insofar as these regions either provided opportunities for strategic basing or bordered on strategic naval straits or sea lanes. In general, Soviet foreign policy was most concerned with superpower relations (and, more broadly, relations between the members of NATO and the Warsaw Pact), but during the 1980s Soviet leaders pursued improved relations with all regions of the world as part of its foreign policy objectives.

== Commissars and ministers ==
The Ministry of Foreign Affairs—called "Narkomindel" until 1949—drafted policy papers for the approval of Stalin and the Politburo, and then sent their orders out to the Soviet embassies. The following persons headed the Commissariat/Ministry as commissars (narkoms), ministers, and deputy ministers during the Soviet era:

Name	Portrait	Took office	Left office	Tenure	Cabinet
People's Commissar for Foreign Affairs of the RSFSR
Leon Trotsky		8 November 1917	9 April 1918	152 days	Lenin I
Georgy Chicherin		9 April 1918	6 July 1923	5 years, 88 days	Lenin I
People's Commissar for Foreign Affairs of the USSR
Georgy Chicherin		6 July 1923	21 July 1930	7 years, 15 days	Lenin II–Rykov I
Maxim Litvinov		21 July 1930	3 May 1939	8 years, 286 days	Molotov I
Vyacheslav Molotov		3 May 1939	15 March 1946	6 years, 305 days	Molotov I–Stalin I
Minister of Foreign Affairs of the USSR
Vyacheslav Molotov		19 March 1946	4 March 1949	2 years, 350 days	Stalin II
Andrey Vyshinsky		4 March 1949	5 March 1953	4 years, 1 day	Stalin II–Malenkov I
Vyacheslav Molotov		5 March 1953	1 June 1956	3 years, 88 days	Malenkov I–Bulganin I
Dmitri Shepilov		1 June 1956	15 February 1957	259 days	Bulganin I
Andrei Gromyko		15 February 1957	2 July 1985	28 years, 137 days	Bulganin I–Tikhonov II
Eduard Shevardnadze		2 July 1985	15 January 1991	5 years, 197 days	Tikhonov II–Pavlov I
Alexander Bessmertnykh		15 January 1991	23 August 1991	220 days	Pavlov I
Boris Pankin		28 August 1991	14 November 1991	78 days	Silayev I
Minister of External Relations of the USSR
Eduard Shevardnadze		19 November 1991	25 December 1991	36 days	Silayev I

== 1917–1939 ==
There were three distinct phases in Soviet foreign policy between the conclusion of the Russian Civil War and the Nazi-Soviet Pact in 1939, determined in part by political struggles within the USSR, and in part by dynamic developments in international relations and the effect these had on Soviet security.

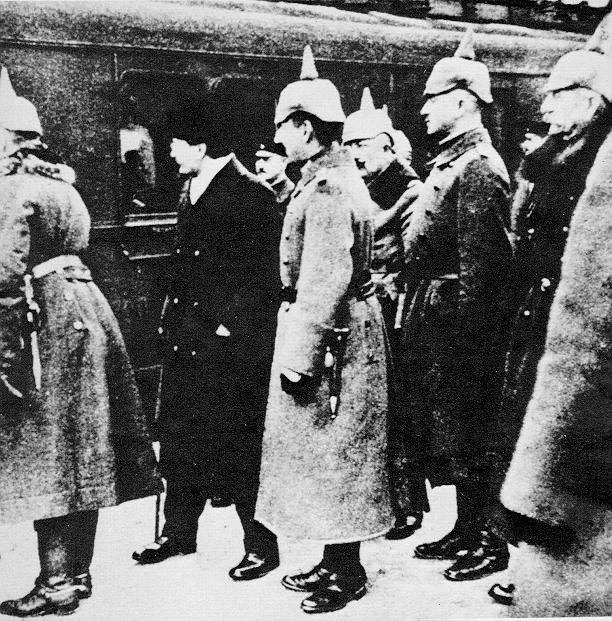
Soviet delegation with Trotsky greeted by German officers at Brest-Litovsk, 8 January 1918

Lenin, once in power, believed the October Revolution would ignite the world's socialists and lead to a "World Revolution." Lenin set up the Communist International (Comintern) to export revolution to the rest of Europe and Asia. Indeed, Lenin set out to "liberate" all of Asia from imperialist and capitalist control. The first stage not only was defeated in key attempts, but angered the other powers by its promise to overthrow capitalism.

=== World revolution ===
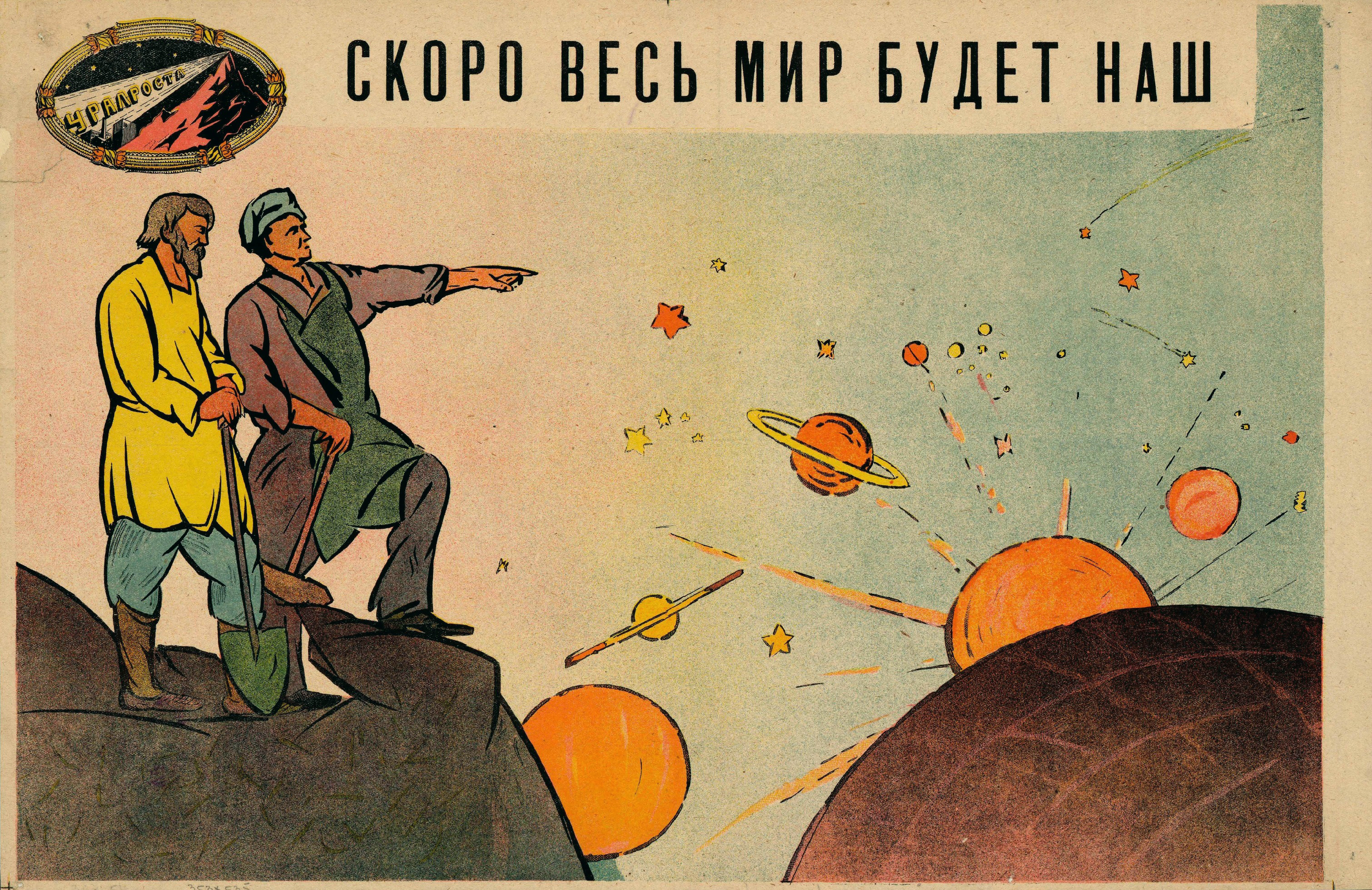
Soon all the World will be ours, 1920

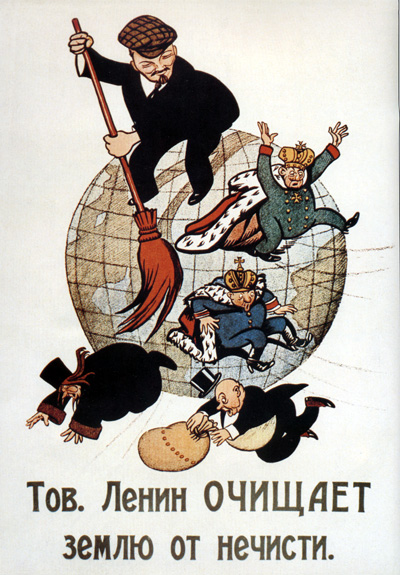
Lenin wipes out kings, priests, and capitalists off the globe.

The Bolsheviks seized power in Russia in the October Revolution of November 1917 but they could not stop the Imperial German Army from advancing rapidly deep into Russia in Operation Faustschlag. The Bolsheviks saw Russia as only the first step—they planned to incite revolutions against capitalism in every western country. The immediate threat was an unstoppable German attack. The Germans wanted to knock Russia out of the war so they could move their forces to the Western Front in spring 1918 before the American Expeditionary Force soldiers fully deployed. In early March 1918, after bitter internal debate, Russia agreed to harsh German peace terms at the Treaty of Brest-Litovsk. Moscow lost control of the Baltic States, Poland, Ukraine, and other areas that before the war produced much of Russia's food supply, industrial base, coal, and communication links with Western Europe." Russia's allies Britain and France felt betrayed: "The treaty was the ultimate betrayal of the Allied cause and sowed the seeds for the Cold War. With Brest-Litovsk the spectre of German domination in Eastern Europe threatened to become reality, and the Allies now began to think seriously about military intervention [in Russia]." In 1918, Britain sent in money and some troops to support the anti-Bolshevik White Army, as well as pro-independence anti-Bolshevik movements on the periphery of the former Empire. France, Japan and the United States also sent forces to block German advances. In effect the Allies were assisting the various anti-Bolshevik forces of different nationalities and political leanings. The Russian Civil War saw the uncoordinated resistance to the Bolsheviks from every direction. However, the Bolsheviks, operating a unified command from a central location, defeated all the opposition one by one and took full control of Russia, as well as conquering newly independent countries such as Ukraine, Georgia, Armenia, and Azerbaijan. The U.S. and France refused to deal with the Soviet regime because of its promise to support revolutions to overthrow governments everywhere. U.S. Secretary of State Bainbridge Colby stated:

It is their [Bolshevik] understanding that the very existence of Bolshevism in Russia, the maintenance of their own rule, depends, and must continue to depend, upon the occurrence of revolutions in all other great civilized nations, including the United States, which will overthrow and destroy their governments and set up Bolshevist rule in their stead. They have made it quite plain that they intend to use every means, including, of course, diplomatic agencies, to promote such revolutionary movements in other countries.

After Germany was defeated in November 1918 and Soviet Russia won the Civil War, the first priority for Moscow was instigating revolutions across Western Europe, above all Germany. It was the country that Lenin most admired and assumed to be most ready for revolution. Lenin also encouraged revolutions that failed in Germany, Bavaria and Hungary from 1918 to 1920 – this support was solely political and economic, and the Red Army did not participate in these revolutions. In 1920, the newly formed state of Poland expanded eastwards into the former Russian territories of Ukraine and Belarus. The Red Army retaliated and invaded Poland, but was defeated outside Warsaw in August 1920. Shortly afterwards, the Russian SFSR sued for peace, which was signed at the Peace of Riga on 18 March 1921. Russia recompensed 30 million roubles, as well as sizeable territory in Belarus and Ukraine, which would be later re-annexed in 1939 after the German-Soviet Pact and subsequent Invasion of Poland.

Independent revolutions had failed to overthrow capitalism. Moscow pulled back from military action and set up the Comintern, designed to foster local communist parties under Kremlin control.

==== American relief and Russian famine of 1921 ====
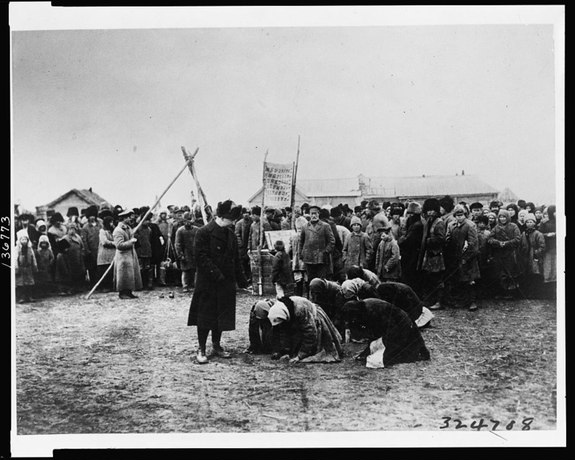
American Relief Administration operations in Russia, 1922

Under Herbert Hoover, very large scale food relief was distributed to Europe after the war through the American Relief Administration. In 1921, to ease the devastating famine in Russia that was triggered by the Soviet government's war communism policies, the ARA's director in Europe, Walter Lyman Brown, began negotiating with the Russian People's Commissar for Foreign Affairs, Maxim Litvinov, in Riga, Latvia (at that time not yet annexed by the USSR). An agreement was reached on 21 August 1921, and an additional implementation agreement was signed by Brown and People's Commissar for Foreign Trade Leonid Krasin on 30 December 1921. The U.S. Congress appropriated $20,000,000 for relief under the Russian Famine Relief Act of late 1921. Hoover strongly detested Bolshevism, and felt the American aid would demonstrate the superiority of Western capitalism and thus help contain the spread of communism.

At its peak, the ARA employed 300 Americans, more than 120,000 Russians and fed 10.5 million people daily. Its Russian operations were headed by Col. William N. Haskell. The Medical Division of the ARA functioned from November 1921 to June 1923 and helped overcome the typhus epidemic then ravaging Russia. The ARA's famine relief operations ran in parallel with much smaller Mennonite, Jewish and Quaker famine relief operations in Russia.

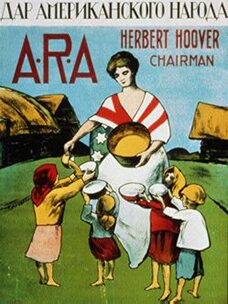
1921 ARA poster saying "The Gift of the American People" in Russian

The ARA's operations in Russia were shut down on 15 June 1923, after it was discovered that Russia under Lenin renewed the export of grain.

=== Success in Central Asia and the Caucasus ===
Lenin's plans failed, although Russia did manage to conquer the Central Asian and Caucasian domains that had been part of the Russian Empire. The revolutionary stage ended after the Soviet defeat in the Battle of Warsaw during the Soviet-Polish War of 1920–21. As Europe's revolutions were crushed and revolutionary zeal dwindled, the Bolsheviks shifted their ideological focus from the world revolution and building socialism around the globe to building socialism inside the Soviet Union, while keeping some of the rhetoric and operations of the Comintern continuing. In the mid-1920s, a policy of peaceful co-existence began to emerge, with Soviet diplomats attempting to end the country's isolation, and concluding bilateral arrangements with capitalist governments. An agreement was reached with Germany, Europe's other pariah, in the Treaty of Rapallo in 1922. At the same time the Rapallo treaty was signed it set up a secret system for hosting large-scale training and research facilities for the German army and air force, despite the strict prohibitions on Germany in the Treaty of Versailles. These facilities operated until 1933 and then in 1939–1941.

The Soviet Union finalized a treaty of friendship with Afghanistan, which had gained full independence following the Third Anglo-Afghan War. The Afghan king, Amanullah Khan, wrote to Moscow stressing his desire for permanent friendly relations; Lenin replied congratulating him and the Afghans for their defense. The Soviets saw possibilities in an alliance with Afghanistan against the United Kingdom, such as using it as a base for a revolutionary advance towards British-controlled India. The treaty of friendship was finalized in 1921.

=== Communist International ===
The Communist International (Comintern), (1919–1943), was an international organization of communist parties. Ostensibly a new group to replace the former Second International after it had collapsed because of World War I, it served as an extension of Soviet foreign policy. It was headed by Grigory Zinoviev (1919–26) and based in the Kremlin; it reported to Lenin and later Stalin. Lenin envisioned the national branches not as political parties, but "as a centralized quasi-religious, and quasi-military movement devoted to the revolution and to service of the Soviet state." Commentators compared it to the Jesuit order, with its vow of obedience. It coordinated the different parties internationally and issued orders that they obeyed. The Comintern resolved at its Second Congress to "struggle by all available means, including armed force, for the overthrow of the international bourgeoisie and the creation of an international Soviet republic as a transition stage to the complete abolition of the state". That policy was soon dropped by 1921 because it interfered with the decision to seek friendly relations with capitalistic nations. The new economic policy at home required trade with the West and bank credits if possible. The main obstacle was Moscow's refusal to honor Tsarist-era debts. The Comintern was officially dissolved by Stalin in 1943 to avoid antagonizing its new allies against Germany, the United States and Great Britain.

=== Stalin: Socialism in one country ===
Trotsky argued for the continuation of the revolutionary process, in terms of his theory of permanent revolution. After Lenin's death in 1924, Trotsky lost the power struggle to Stalin and Nikolai Bukharin. Trotsky was sent into exile in 1929 and in 1940 was assassinated on Stalin's orders.

Stalin's main policy was socialism in one country. He focused on modernization of the Soviet Union, developing manufacturing, building infrastructure and improving agriculture. Expansion and wars were no longer on the agenda. The Kremlin-sponsored united front policy, with foreign Communist parties taking the lead in education and national liberation movements. The goal was opposition to fascism, especially the Nazi variety.

The high point of the United Front was the partnership in China between the Chinese Communist Party and the nationalist Kuomintang. The United Front policy in China effectively crashed to ruin in 1927, when Kuomintang leader Chiang Kai-shek massacred the native Communists and expelled all of his Soviet advisors, notably Mikhail Borodin. A short war erupted in 1929 as the Soviets successfully fought to keep control of the Chinese Eastern Railway in Manchuria.

After defeating all his opponents from both the left (led by Trotsky and Grigory Zinoviev) and the right (led by Bukharin), Stalin was in full charge. He began the wholesale collectivization of Soviet agriculture, accompanied by a massive program of planned industrialization.

=== Respectability and normal relations ===
After 1921 the main foreign-policy goals were for the major powers to treat the Soviet state as a normal country, and to open trade relations and diplomatic recognition. There was no more crusading for world revolution: the Communist Party leadership began to recognize that international revolution would not come and that Soviet Russia would have to reach some form of temporary accommodation with the "bourgeois" capitalist countries. The first breakthrough came in 1921 with the Anglo-Soviet Trade Agreement that signified de facto recognition of the RSFSR. The United States refused recognition until 1933; however, Henry Ford, alongside other American entrepreneurs and corporations, invested heavily in the Soviet Union, importing modern management-techniques and new industrial technology.

Georgy Chicherin served as Soviet Russia's People's Commissar for Foreign Affairs (foreign minister) from 1918 to 1930. He worked against the League of Nations and attempted to lure the German Weimar Republic into an alliance with Moscow, an effort aided by his close personal friendship with the German Ambassador to Moscow, Ulrich von Brockdorff-Rantzau (in office: 1922–1928). Diplomatic tensions fed into the war scare of 1927.

The League made several efforts to develop better relations with Russia, but these attempts were always rebuffed: the Soviets regarded the League as simply an alliance of hostile, capitalist powers. The USSR did not seek admission to the League of Nations until 1934, when it joined with French backing. It was expelled from the League in 1939 following the Soviet invasion of Finland.

==== Rapallo Treaty 1922 ====
The Genoa Conference of 1922 brought the Soviet Union and Germany for the first time into negotiations with the major European powers. The conference broke down when France insisted that Germany pay more in reparations, and demanded that Moscow start paying off the Tsarist-era debts that it had repudiated. Soviet Russia and Germany were both pariah countries, deeply distrusted. The solution for the Soviets and the Weimar Germans was to get together at the nearby resort city of Rapallo, Italy, where they quickly negotiated the 1922 Treaty of Rapallo. In a friendly agreement, they made a clean break with the past, repudiating all old financial and territorial obligations and agreeing to normalize diplomatic and economic relations. Secretly, the two sides established elaborate military cooperation, while publicly denying it. This enabled Germany to rebuild its army and air force secretly at sites in the Soviet Union, in violation of the 1919 Treaty of Versailles.

==== Great Britain ====
===== Trade and recognition =====
At the direction of the Comintern, by 1937, 10% of Communist Party of Great Britain members were operating secretly inside the British Labour Party, campaigning to change its policy on affiliation and to engineer a Popular Front. The Labour leadership fought back and became bitter enemies of Communism. When Labour came to power in the 1945 UK general election, it was increasingly hostile to the Soviet Union and supported the United States.

===== Zinoviev letter =====
Four days before the British general election in 1924 the London Daily Mail newspaper published the Zinoviev letter. This document, purportedly a directive from Grigory Zinoviev, the head of the Communist International in Moscow, to the Communist Party of Great Britain, ordered it to engage in seditious activities. It predicted that the resumption of diplomatic relations (by a Labour government) would hasten the radicalization of the British working class. This would have constituted a significant interference in British politics, and as a result, it was deeply offensive to British voters, turning them against the Labour Party. The letter seemed authentic at the time, but historians now agree it was a forgery. The letter aided the Conservative Party under Stanley Baldwin, by hastening the collapse of the Liberal Party vote that produced a Conservative landslide against Ramsay MacDonald's Labour Party. A. J. P. Taylor argued that the most important impact was on the psychology of Labourites, who for years afterward blamed their defeat on foul play, thereby misunderstanding the political forces at work and postponing necessary reforms in the Labour Party.

==== United States ====
In the 1920s, the Republican administrations in Washington refused to recognize the Soviet régime. However, some American businesses, led by Henry Ford, opened close relations. The Soviets greatly admired American technology and welcomed help in achieving the ambitious industrial goals of Stalin's First Five-Year Plan of 1928–1932. Ford built modern factories and trained Soviet engineers. President Franklin Roosevelt recognized the USSR in 1933, in the expectation that trade would soar and help the US out of its economic depression. That goal did not materialize, but Roosevelt maintained good relations with Moscow until his death in 1945.

=== Attack on social democratic parties ===
In the late 1920s and early 1930s, Stalin insisted on a policy of fighting against non-communist socialist movements everywhere. This new radical phase was paralleled by the formulation of a new doctrine in the International, that of the so-called Third Period, an ultra-left switch in policy, which argued that social democracy, whatever shape it took, was a form of social fascism, socialist in theory but fascist in practice. All foreign Communist parties – increasingly agents of Soviet policy – were to concentrate their efforts in a struggle against their rivals in the working-class movement, ignoring the threat of real fascism. There were to be no united fronts against a greater enemy.

==== Battling social democracy in Germany 1927–1932 ====
In Germany, Stalin gave a high priority to an anti-capitalist revolution in Germany. His Communist Party of Germany (KPD) split the working-class vote with the moderate Social Democratic Party. The SPD was the historic social democratic party in Germany, and tempered its Marxism to drop revolutionary goals and instead focus on systematic improvement of the condition of the working-class. This approach ran contrary to the goals and beliefs of the KPD which considered such short term concessions for the working that served only to delay the revolution. In the Reichstag, the KPD sought to overthrow the Weimar government, which was historically controlled by a moderate coalition of liberals, Catholics, and the social democrats. As the Nazi Party grew rapidly throughout the early 1930s, winning support among the Protestant working class and financial capitalists, this system became increasingly undermined by political extremists. There was some fighting between the KPD and the Nazis in Germany's industrial cities. However, after The Communist International's abrupt ultra-left turn in its Third Period from 1928, the KPD regarded the Social Democratic Party of Germany (SPD) as its main adversary and adopted the position that the SPD was the main fascist party in Germany. This was based on the theory of social fascism that had been proclaimed by Joseph Stalin and that was supported by the Comintern during the late 1920s and early 1930s, which held that social democracy was a variant of fascism. Consequently, the KPD held that it was "the only anti-fascist party" in Germany and stated that "fighting fascism means fighting the SPD just as much as it means fighting Hitler and the parties of Brüning." In KPD and Soviet usage, fascism was primarily viewed as the final stage of capitalism rather than a specific group or movement such as the Italian Fascists or the German Nazis and, based on this theory, the term was applied quite broadly.

In 1929, the KPD's banned public May Day rally in Berlin was broken up by police; 33 people were killed in the clash and subsequent rioting. The RFB was then banned as extremist by the governing Social Democrats. In 1930, the KPD established the RFB's de facto successor, known as Kampfbund gegen den Faschismus ("Fighting Alliance against Fascism"). In late 1931, local Roter Massenselbstschutz ("Red Mass Self-Defence") units were formed by Kampfbund members as autonomous and loosely organized structures under the leadership of, but outside the formal organization of the KPD as part of the party's united front policy to work with other working class groups to defeat "fascism" as interpreted by the party.

During the Third Period, the KPD viewed the Nazi Party ambiguously. On one hand, the KPD considered the Nazi Party to be one of the fascist parties. On the other hand, the KPD sought to appeal to the Strasserite-wing of the Nazi movement by using nationalist slogans. The KPD sometimes cooperated with the Nazis in attacking the SPD. In 1931, the KPD had united with the Nazis, whom they referred to as "working people's comrades", in an unsuccessful attempt to bring down the SPD state government of Prussia by means of a referendum. In the usage of the Soviet Union, and of the Comintern and its affiliated parties in this period, including the KPD, the epithet fascist was used to describe capitalist society in general and virtually any anti-Soviet or anti-Stalinist activity or opinion.

The formation of Antifaschistische Aktion in 1932 indicated a shift away from the Third Period policies, as fascism came to be recognised as a more serious threat (the two red flags on its logo symbolized Communists in unity with socialists), leading up to the 1934 and 1935 adoption of a popular front policy of anti-fascist unity with non-Communist groups. In October 1931, a coalition of right-wing and far-right parties established the Harzburg Front, which opposed the government of the Centre Party's Heinrich Brüning. In response, the SPD and affiliated group established the Iron Front to defend liberal democracy and the constitution of the Weimar Republic. Antifaschistische Aktion was formed partly as a counter-move to the SPD's establishment of the Iron Front, which the KPD regarded as a "social fascist terror organisation." However, from the mid-1930s, the term anti-fascist became ubiquitous in Soviet, Comintern, and KPD usage, as Communists who had been attacking democratic rivals were now told to change tack and engage in coalitions with them against the fascist threat.

According to George Stein, a secret major military collaboration between Russia and Germany began in the early 1920s. Both sides benefitted from operational activities at the bases of Lipetsk, Kazan, and Torski. When Hitler and his Nazis came to power in 1933, the collaboration ended because Stalin feared the dangerous expansionist policy of the Nazis and neither he nor Hitler would risk further cooperation. Instead Stalin ordered Germans to cooperate with the SPD, but Hitler quickly suppressed both. With the KPD destroyed, a few leaders managed to escape into exile in Moscow, some of whom would be executed and others become leaders of East Germany in 1945. Simultaneously in Germany, the Nazis completely destroyed the SPD, imprisoning its leaders or forcing them into exile as well.

According to historian Eric D. Weitz, 60% of German exiles in the Soviet Union had been liquidated during the Stalinist terror and a higher proportion of the KPD Politburo membership had died in the Soviet Union than in Nazi Germany. Weitz also noted that hundreds of German citizens, most of them Communists, were handed over to the Gestapo by Stalin's administration.

=== Popular fronts (1933–1939) ===
Communists and parties on the left were increasingly threatened by the growth of the Nazi movement. Hitler came to power in January 1933 and rapidly consolidated his control over Germany, destroyed the communist and socialist movements in Germany, and rejected the restraints imposed by the Versailles treaty. Stalin in 1934 reversed his decision in 1928 to attack socialists, and introduced his new plan: the "popular front." It was a coalition of anti-fascist parties usually organized by the local communists acting under instructions from the Comintern. The new policy was to work with all parties on the left and center in a multiparty coalition against fascism and Nazi Germany in particular. The new slogan was: "The People's Front Against Fascism and War". Under this policy, Communist Parties were instructed to form broad alliances with all anti-fascist parties with the aim of both securing social advance at home and a military alliance with the USSR to isolate the fascist dictatorships. The "Popular Fronts" thus formed proved to be successful in only a few countries, and only for a few years each, forming the government in France, Chile and Spain, and also China. It was not a political success elsewhere. The Popular Front approach played a major role in Resistance movements in France and other countries conquered by Germany after 1939. After the war it played a major role in French and Italian politics.

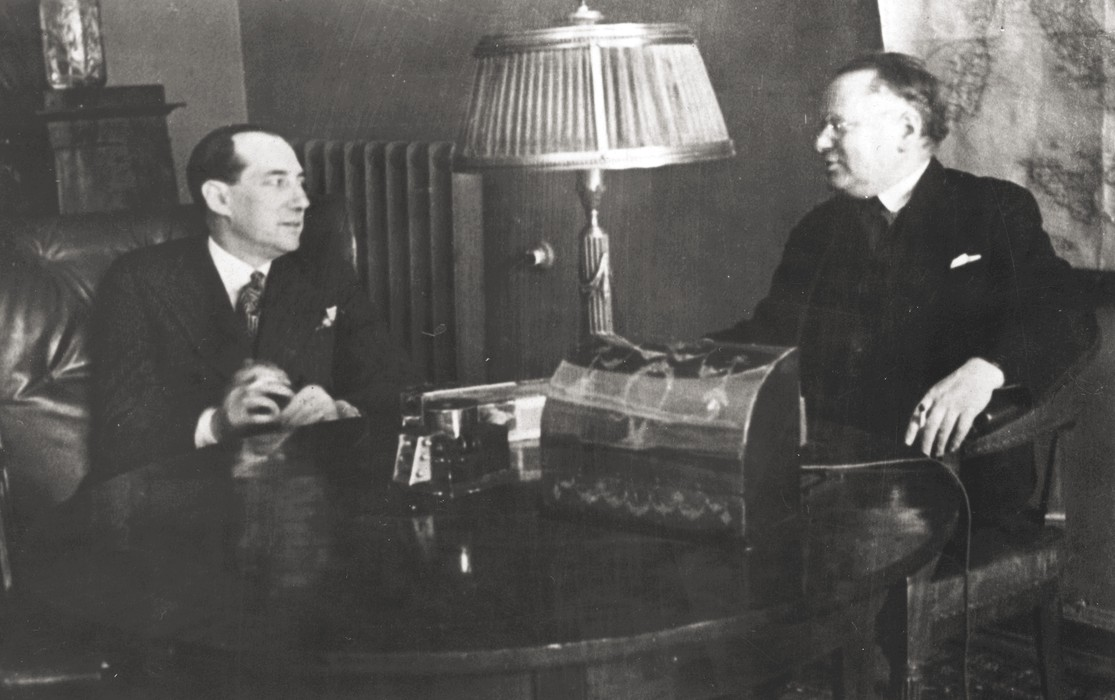
Maxim Litvinov with Polish foreign minister Józef Beck in Moscow, February 1934

Hand-in-hand with the promotion of Popular Fronts, Maxim Litvinov, the Soviet Commissar for Foreign Affairs between 1930 and 1939, aimed at closer alliances with Western governments, and placed ever greater emphasis on collective security. The new policy led to the Soviet Union joining the League of Nations in 1934 and the subsequent non-aggression pacts with France and Czechoslovakia. In the League the Soviets were active in demanding action against imperialist aggression, a particular danger to them after the 1931 Japanese invasion of Manchuria, which eventually resulted in the Soviet-Japanese Battle of Khalkhin Gol.

Ignoring the agreement it signed to avoid involvement in the Spanish Civil War, the USSR sent arms and troops and organized volunteers to fight for the republican government. Communist forces systematically killed their old enemies the Spanish anarchists, even though they were on the same Republican side. The Spanish government sent its entire treasury to Moscow for safekeeping, but it was never returned.

The Munich Agreement of 1938, the first stage in the dismemberment of Czechoslovakia, gave rise to Soviet fears that they were likely to be abandoned in a possible war with Germany.

In the face of continually dragging and seemingly hopeless negotiations with Britain and France, a new cynicism and hardness entered Soviet foreign relations when Litvinov was replaced by Vyacheslav Molotov in May 1939.

==== Alliance with France ====
By 1935, Moscow and Paris identified Nazi Germany as the main military, diplomatic, ideological, and economic threat. Germany could probably defeat each one separately in a war, but would avoid a two-front war against both of them simultaneously. The solution, therefore, was a military alliance. It was pursued by Louis Barthou, the French foreign minister, but he was assassinated in October 1934 and his successor, Pierre Laval, was more inclined to Germany. However, after the declaration of German rearmament in March 1935 the French government forced the reluctant Laval to conclude a treaty. Written in 1935, it took effect in 1936. Both Paris and Moscow hoped other countries would join in and Czechoslovakia to sign treaties with both France and the Soviet Union. Prague wanted to use the USSR as a counterweight against the growing strength of Nazi Germany. Poland might make a good partner too, but it refused to join in. The military provisions were practically useless because of multiple conditions and the requirement that the United Kingdom and Fascist Italy approve any action. The effectiveness was undermined even further by the French government's insistent refusal to accept a military convention stipulating the way in which the two armies would coordinate actions in the event of war with Germany. The result was a symbolic pact of friendship and mutual assistance of little consequence other than raising the prestige of both parties.

The Treaty marked a large scale shift in Soviet policy in the Comintern from a pro-revisionist stance against the Treaty of Versailles to a more western-oriented foreign policy as championed by Maxim Litvinov. Hitler justified the remilitarization of the Rhineland by the ratification of the treaty in the French parliament, claiming that he felt threatened by the pact. However, after 1936, the French lost interest, and all parties in Europe realized the treaty was effectively a dead letter. The appeasement policies of the prime ministers of Britain and France, Neville Chamberlain and Édouard Daladier were widely held because they seemed to promise what Chamberlain called "peace for our time." However, by early 1939 it was clear that it further encouraged Nazi aggression.

The Soviet Union was not invited to the critical Munich conference in late September 1938, where Britain, France, and Italy appeased Hitler by giving in to his demands to take over the Sudetenland, a largely German-speaking area of Western Czechoslovakia. Distrust was high in all directions. Leaders in London and Paris felt that Stalin wanted to see a major war between the capitalist nations Germany on the one hand, and Britain and France on the other, in order to advance the prospects of a working-class revolution in Europe. Meanwhile, Stalin felt the Western Powers were plotting to embroil Germany and Russia in war in order to preserve bourgeois capitalism. After Hitler took over all of Czechoslovakia in 1939, proving appeasement was a disaster, Britain and France tried to involve the Soviet Union and a real military alliance. Their attempts were futile because Poland refused to allow any Soviet troops on its soil.

=== Diplomats purged ===
In 1937–1938, Stalin took total personal control of the party, by purging and executing tens of thousands of high-level and mid-level party officials, especially the Old Bolsheviks who had joined before 1917. The entire diplomatic service was downsized; many consular offices abroad were closed, and restrictions were placed on the activities and movements of foreign diplomats in the USSR. About a third of all foreign ministry officials were shot or imprisoned, including 62 of the 100 most senior officials. Key ambassadorial posts abroad, such as those in Tokyo, Warsaw, Washington, Bucharest, and Budapest, were vacant.

=== Non-Aggression Pact with Germany (1939–1941) ===
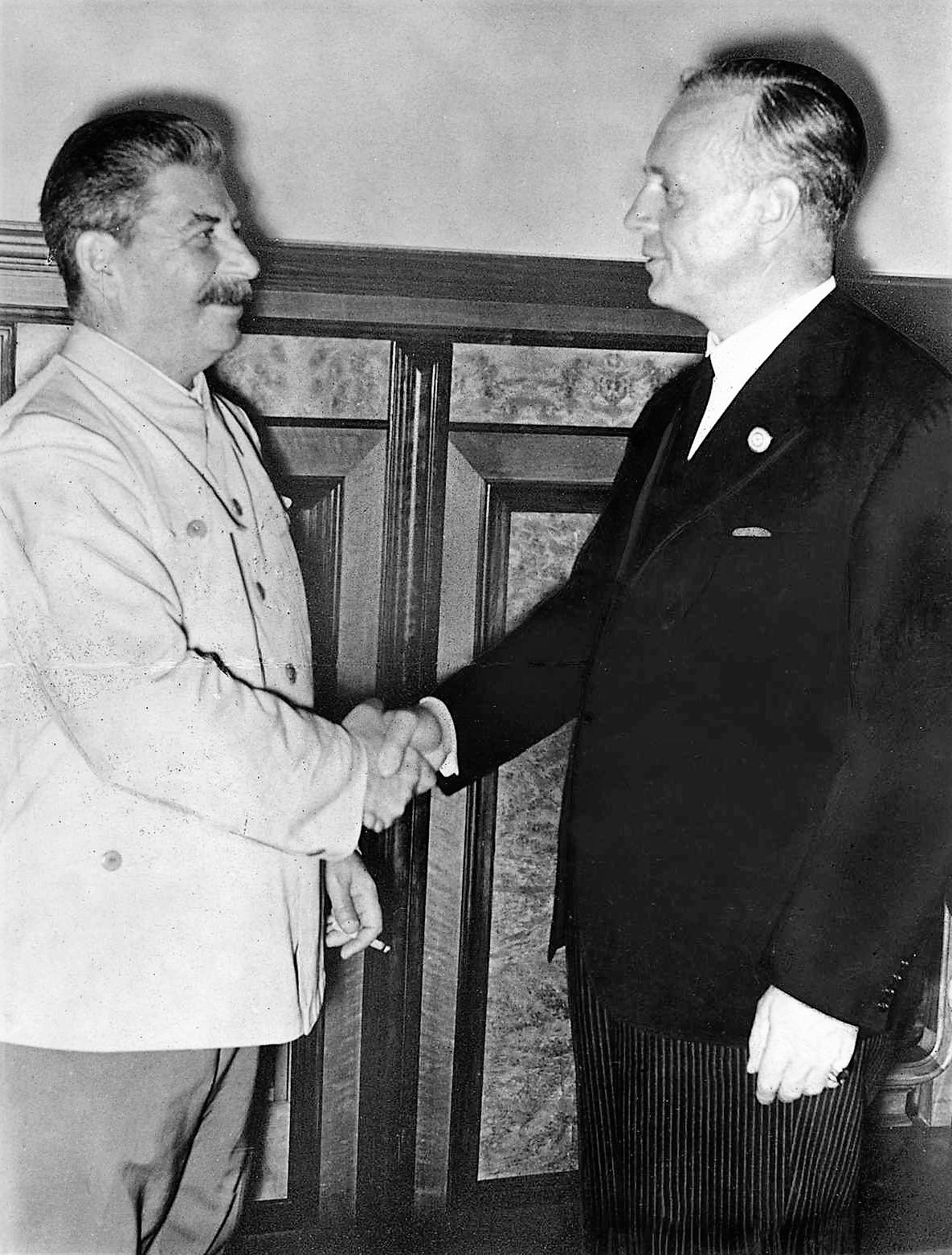
Stalin and Ribbentrop shaking hands after the signing of the pact in Moscow in August 1939.

In 1938–1939, the Soviet Union attempted to form strong military alliances with Germany's enemies, including Poland, France, and Great Britain, but they all refused. In an effort to build up the Soviet military, Stalin made a non-aggression pact with Hitler, along with a secret protocol, and the two countries invaded and partitioned Poland. The Soviet Union additionally invaded and annexed the Baltic states, as well as attacking Finland in the Winter War, for which the USSR was expelled from the League of Nations. Soon after the pact, Germany invaded Poland on 1 September 1939. Stalin's invasion of Bukovina in 1940 violated the pact since it went beyond the Soviet sphere of influence that had been agreed with the Axis. The German-Soviet pact provided for large sales of Russian grain and oil to Germany, while Germany would share its military technology with the Soviet Union. The ensuing Molotov–Ribbentrop Pact astonished the world and signaled the war would start very soon. French historian François Furet says, "The pact signed in Moscow by Ribbentrop and Molotov on 23 August 1939 inaugurated the alliance between the USSR and Nazi Germany. It was presented as an alliance and not just a nonaggression pact." Other historians dispute the characterization of this treaty as an "alliance," because Hitler secretly intended to invade the USSR in the future.

== World War II ==
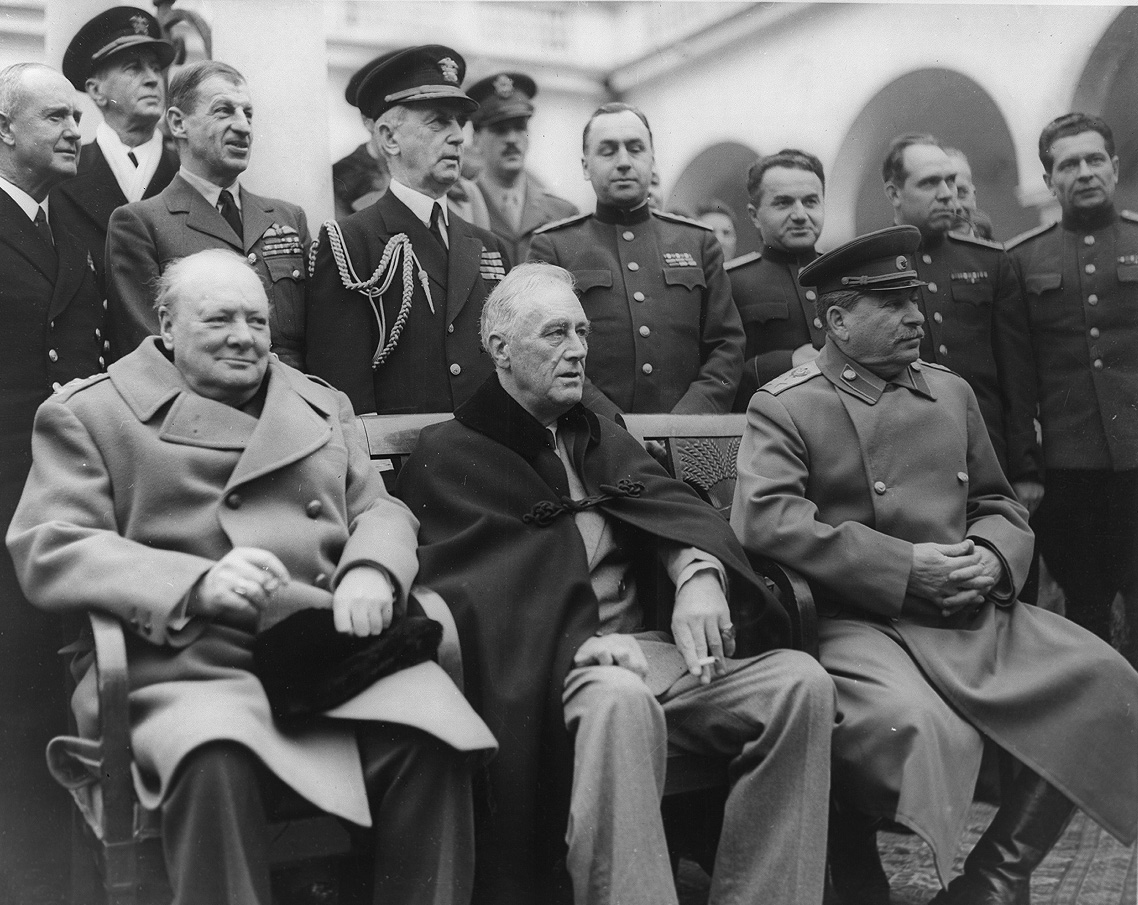
Soviet General Secretary Stalin, US President Roosevelt and British Prime Minister Churchill confer in Yalta in 1945.

Stalin controlled the foreign policy of the Soviet Union, with Vyacheslav Molotov as the foreign minister. Their policy was neutrality until August 1939, followed by friendly relations with Germany in order to carve up Eastern Europe. The USSR helped supply oil and munitions to Germany as its armies rolled across Western Europe in May–June 1940. Despite repeated warnings, Stalin refused to believe that Hitler was planning an all-out war on the USSR. Stalin was stunned and temporarily helpless when Hitler invaded in June 1941. Stalin quickly came to terms with Britain and the United States, cemented through a series of summit meetings. The US and Britain supplied war materials in large quantity through Lend Lease. There was some coordination of military action, especially in summer 1944. At war's end the central issue was whether Stalin would allow free elections in eastern Europe.

== Cold War (1947–1991) ==
The Soviet Union is seen in red while states in light pink were satellites; Yugoslavia, a communist state that was a Soviet ally until 1948, is marked in purple; and Albania, a communist state which ceased being allied to the Soviet Union in the 1960s after the Sino-Soviet split, is marked in orange

=== Europe ===
The Soviet Union emerged from World War II devastated in human and economic terms, but much enlarged in area. Militarily it was one of the two major world powers, a position maintained for four decades through its hegemony in Eastern Europe, military strength, involvement in many countries through local communist parties, and scientific research especially into arms, weaponry and space technology. The USSR's effort to extend its influence or control over many states and peoples resulted in significant resistance from the West. Established in 1949 as an economic bloc of communist countries led by Moscow, the Council for Mutual Economic Assistance (COMECON) served as a framework for cooperation among the planned economies of the Soviet Union, its satellite states in Eastern Europe and, later, Soviet allies in the Third World. The military counterpart to the Comecon was the Warsaw Pact.

The Soviet Union concentrated on its own recovery. It seized and transferred most of Germany's industrial plants and it exacted war reparations from East Germany, Hungary, Romania, and Bulgaria, using Soviet-dominated joint enterprises. It used trading arrangements deliberately designed to favor the Soviet Union. Moscow controlled the Communist parties that ruled the satellite states, and they followed orders from the Kremlin. Historian Mark Kramer concludes:

The net outflow of resources from eastern Europe to the Soviet Union was approximately $15 billion to $20 billion in the first decade after World War II, an amount roughly equal to the total aid provided by the United States to western Europe under the Marshall Plan.

Moscow considered Eastern Europe to be a buffer zone for the forward defense of its western borders and ensured its control of the region by transforming the East European countries into subservient allies. In 1956, Soviet troops crushed a popular uprising in Hungary and acted again in 1968 to end the Czechoslovak government's Prague Spring attempts at reform. Both countries were members of the Warsaw Pact: In addition to military occupation and intervention, the Soviet Union controlled Eastern European states through its ability to supply or withhold vital natural resources.

=== Espionage ===
All sides in the Cold War engaged in espionage. The Soviet KGB ("Committee for State Security"), the bureau responsible for foreign espionage and internal surveillance, was famous for its effectiveness. The most famous Soviet operation involved its atomic spies that delivered crucial information from the United States' Manhattan Project, leading the USSR to detonate its first nuclear weapon in 1949, four years after the American detonation and much sooner than expected. A massive network of informants throughout the Soviet Union was used to monitor dissent from official Soviet politics and morals.

Historian Raymond L. Garthoff concludes there probably was parity in the quantity and quality of secret information obtained by each side. The Soviets probably had an advantage in terms of HUMINT (espionage) and "sometimes in its reach into high policy circles." Did it matter? In terms of decisive impact Garthoff concludes:

We also can now have high confidence in the judgment that there were no successful "moles" at the political decision-making level on either side. Similarly, there is no evidence, on either side, of any major political or military decision that was prematurely discovered through espionage and thwarted by the other side. There also is no evidence of any major political or military decision that was crucially influenced (much less generated) by an agent of the other side.

In terms of the impact of intelligence on national policy it was not so much the minute details, or capture of top-secret plans that mattered most. Instead, every major country used its intelligence services to develop complex images of their adversaries, and to predict to the top leadership what they would do next.

The USSR and East Germany proved especially successful in placing spies in Britain and West Germany. Moscow was largely unable to repeat its successes from 1933 to 1945 in the United States. NATO, on the other hand, also had a few successes of importance, of whom Oleg Gordievsky was perhaps the most influential. He was a senior KGB officer who was a double agent on behalf of Britain's MI6, providing a stream of high-grade intelligence that had an important influence on the thinking of Margaret Thatcher and Ronald Reagan in the 1980s. He was spotted by Aldrich Ames, a Soviet agent who worked for the CIA, but he was successfully exfiltrated from Moscow in 1985. Biographer Ben McIntyre argues he was the West's most valuable human asset, especially for his deep psychological insights into the inner circles of the Kremlin. He convinced Washington and London that the fierceness and bellicosity of the Kremlin was a product of fear, and military weakness, rather than an urge for world conquest. Thatcher and Reagan concluded they could moderate their own anti-Soviet rhetoric, as successfully happened when Mikhail Gorbachev took power, thus ending the Cold War.

=== Africa ===
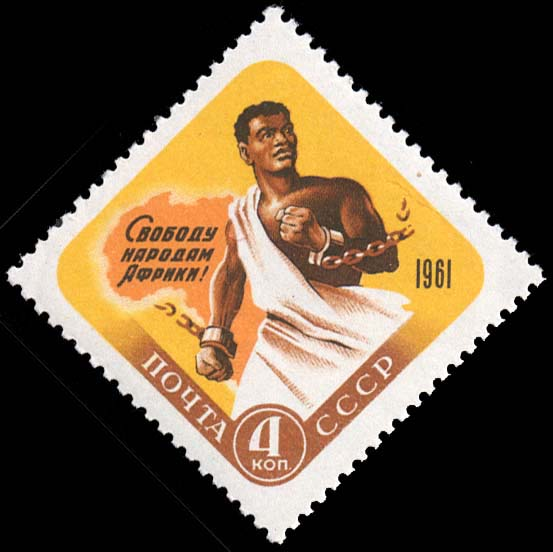
1961 Soviet postage stamp: "Freedom to the peoples of Africa!"

Stalin made Africa a very low priority, and discouraged relationships or studies of the continent. However, the decolonization process of the 1950s and early 1960s opened new opportunities, which Soviet leader Nikita Khrushchev was eager to exploit.

The Kremlin developed four major long-term policy goals:

- to gain a lasting presence on the continent,
- to gain a voice in African affairs,
- to undermine Western/NATO influence, especially by identifying capitalism with Western imperialism,
- and, after 1962, it fought hard to prevent the People's Republic of China from developing its own countervailing presence.

At no time was Moscow willing to engage in combat in Africa, although its ally Cuba did so. Indeed, the Kremlin at first assumed that the Russian model of socialized development would prove attractive to Africans eager to modernize. That did not happen, and instead, the Soviets emphasized identifying likely allies and giving them financial aid and munitions, as well as credits to purchase from the Soviet bloc. Although some countries became allies for a while, including Angola, Somalia, and Ethiopia, the connections proved temporary. With the collapse of the Soviet Union in 1991, Russian influence greatly diminished.

=== Middle East and North Africa ===
==== Relations with Israel ====
For its first years Israel had wanted to remain on good terms with the USSR, but after antisemitism in the USSR rose and the Israeli public opinion turned on the USSR, relations turned. The Israeli government was still hesitant to change its stance on the USSR as shown by renowned Israeli UN ambassador and politician named Abba Eban who said America wanted to add their, "...loud and resounding voice to those who disparage the Soviet Union along with the entire propagandist political spectrum the world over." The first source of tension in relations between Israel and the Soviet Union occurred on 9 February 1953 (four weeks before the death of Joseph Stalin), when the USSR severed relations with Israel. The USSR used a bomb incident against the Soviet Legation in Tel Aviv as an excuse to end relations and claimed that the government was responsible. The Israeli government received this news with shock and concern. This was the first breach in diplomatic relations that Israel had experienced with a superpower. There is a general consensus that Israeli charges against the USSR Doctors' Plot and public want for improvement for the Soviet Jews were deciding factors. Without Israel's fierce hostility to the false allegations of the Doctors' Plot, the Soviet Union most likely would not have ended relations. After the rupture, Israel continued to speak out against the Doctors' Plot, and successfully attracted international attention.

After the death of Stalin in 1953, the Soviet Union's foreign policy was less hostile. The new Soviet Prime Minister, Vyacheslav Molotov, presented a new policy of openness and peacefulness. This new policy inspired Israel to initiate relations with the USSR again, on condition that Israel would no longer criticize the USSR publicly, especially regarding the Soviet Jews. Moscow began to support the Arab states in the Arab-Israeli conflict in order to use this conflict for its own confrontation with the West.

On 2 February 1958 Egypt and Syria declared the establishment of a common federation: the United Arab Republic. The destruction of Israel was their main goal. In 1955, the USSR made an arms deal with Egypt. This angered Israel. While Britain sided with the US and agreed to withhold further funding for the construction of Egypt's Aswan Dam in July 1956, Britain was also furious at the action and believed that America's withdrawal of aid had provided the opening for Soviet penetration of Egypt. Both Britain and Israel now saw Egypt as a threat to regional stability.

The Suez Crisis occurred in the second half of 1956. At this time, Britain, France and Israel invaded Egypt, claiming that they were protecting the Suez Canal. The USSR saw this event as a threat to its security and international prestige by the West. Britain and France lost prestige when the United States opposed the invasion and forced a withdrawal. The Suez Crisis was the first clash between Israel's security interests and the strategic interests of the USSR in the Middle East.

The Soviet Union welcomes Nasser in 1958

On 5 June 1967, the Six-Day War commenced. Immediately, the Soviet Union went to the United Nations to stop the war and remove Israeli forces from the border. The USSR threatened to break off relations with Israel. The USSR never wanted a war to occur in the Middle East. By 10 June, the Soviet Union threatened to intervene militarily if Israel did not stop its advance towards Syria.

In March 1985 Mikhail Gorbachev became the Secretary General of the CPSU and in April he declared Perestroika. It took more than 6 years before Moscow consented to restore diplomatic relations with Israel on 19 October 1991, just 2 months prior to the collapse of the USSR.

===== Six-Day War against Israel =====
During the Six-Day War, the United Arab Republic asked the Soviet Union for more arms, but the Soviet Union denied its request because it wanted the war to end. The war ended in the defeat of the UAR and Syria on 10 June. Once the war was over, though, the Soviet Union was satisfied with the state of the Middle East and gave weapons to the Arabs in order to repair relations with them. For the Soviet Union, defeat meant that its position in the Middle East was impaired and its weapons and military training were given a poor reputation. Following this loss, Gamal Abdel Nasser agreed to allow the Soviets to keep military bases in the country.

==== Egypt ====
In 1955, Egypt made an arms deal with Czechoslovakia. This was technically a deal between Egypt and the Soviet Union because Czechoslovakia had Soviet arms. At this point, Egypt was neutral towards the Soviet Union and made the deal to manipulate the United States into giving it financial aid. The arms deal was the Soviet Union's first step in creating relations with Arab states and gaining a foothold in the Middle East for expansion and domination.

US Secretary of State John Foster Dulles was deeply suspicious of Egyptian president Gamal Abdel Nasser, whom he believed to be a reckless and dangerous nationalist. Following Egypt's arms deal with Czechoslovakia, however, others in the Eisenhower administration convinced Dulles that the American aid might pull Nasser back from his relationship with the Soviet Union and prevent the growth of Soviet power in the Middle East. In December 1955, Secretary Dulles announced that the United States, together with Great Britain, was providing nearly $75 million in foreign aid to Egypt to help in the construction of the Aswan Dam on the Nile River. In response to Nasser's increasing attacks on Western colonialism and imperialism and Egypt's continued alliance with the Soviet Union, Britain and the United States withdrew funds for the Aswan Dam in July 1956. That action drove Egypt further toward an alliance with the Soviet Union and was a contributing factor to the Suez Crisis later in 1956. Nasser responded to the aid cut by nationalizing the Suez Canal and the Soviets then rushed to Egypt's aid; the Aswan Dam was officially opened in 1964.

During the 1956 Suez Crisis, the Soviet Union sided with Egypt. The USSR viewed the nationalization of the Suez Canal as important to the removal of Western influence from within the Middle East. Additionally, the Soviet Union was willing to fund Egypt because in return, it received access to warm-water ports, which it desperately needed to spread its influence. Though US President Dwight D. Eisenhower was also infuriated at the invasion and had successfully brought an end to end to Suez Crisis by pressuring the invading forces to withdraw from Egypt by early 1957, the United States continued to maintain good relations with Britain, France and Israel and sought to limit Soviet ally Nasser's influence, thus damaging its relations with the Middle East for the next 35 years. By continuing to side with Egypt, the Soviet Union gained more prestige in the Middle East and succeeded in intimidating its superpower opponent, the United States. Nasser's pan-Arab influence spread throughout the Middle East and he soon gained a popular image among those who resented Western colonialism. In spite of his alliance with the Soviet Union, Nasser would not sign a military alliance pact with the nation; made efforts to prevent the spread of communism and other foreign influences throughout the Arab region by forming a civil union with Syria known as the United Arab Republic (UAR)—a nation which he had hoped other Arab states would eventually join as well—in 1958; and was a founding father of the Non-Aligned Movement in 1961; though the union with Syria collapsed in 1961, Egypt would still be officially known as the United Arab Republic for a while longer.

===== Egypt and Israel =====
By 1969, Nasser had formed an alliance with Jordan's King Hussein and started to move towards cementing peace with Israel in exchange for the return of the Sinai Peninsula and the formation of a Palestinian state in the Gaza Strip and West Bank. On 28 September 1970, Nasser died of a heart attack and his vice president Anwar Sadat succeeded him. Though Sadat sought to maintain good relations with the Soviet Union, he was also willing to consider economic assistance from nations outside the Arab region and the Eastern Bloc as well. In 1971, Sadat, hoping to help the nation's economy recover from its losses in the Six-Day War, officially changed the UAR's name back to Egypt and signed a Treaty of Friendship and Cooperation with the Soviet Union. In 1972, however, the direction of Soviet-Egypt relations changed dramatically when Sadat ordered Soviet military personnel to leave the country. Throughout the remainder of the 1970s, Sadat developed strong relations with the Western powers, repealed Egypt's Treaty of Friendship and Cooperation with the Soviet Union in March 1976, made peace with Israel in March 1979 following the Camp David Accords—where it was agreed that Israel would depart from the Sinai Peninsula in exchange for making the area a demilitarized zone and that Egypt would not seek claims to a Palestinian state in the Gaza Strip and West Bank in exchange for annual economic and military aid from the United States—and distanced Egypt from the Soviet Union. The Soviet Union now focused on building relations with its three other principal allies in the Middle East: Syria, Iraq and the Palestine Liberation Organization (PLO).

==== PLO ====
In 1964, Nasser and other Arab League in Cairo Summit 1964 initiated the creation of the Palestine Liberation Organization to represent the Palestinian people. Despite establishing ties with the new organization, the Soviet government also feared the PLO would weaken their influence in the Arab region and reacted with skepticism towards the group's leadership. Following the Six-Day War, however, Soviet influence would further increase in the Arab region and PLO would follow suit. In March 1968, Yasser Arafat and his Fatah organization gained international attention and popularity in the Arab region when it engaged in a full-scale battle with the Israel Defense Force at the city of Karameh in Jordan, in which 150 Palestinians and 29 Israelis were killed. Two months later, Fatah would join the PLO and Arafat was appointed as the organization's Chairman. Under Arafat's leadership, favoritism towards the USSR was firmly established within the ranks of the PLO and the organization would frequently buy Eastern Bloc military equipment to carry out sporadic terrorist attacks against Israel.

In 1972, the Soviets declared the PLO the vanguard of the Arab liberation movement. Nevertheless, the Soviets still refused to let the PLO influence their standing in the Arab–Israeli peace process and sought to push their own proposed resolutions before the UN Security Council. In September 1978, however, Soviet influence over the Arab-Israeli peace progress weakened significantly after Egypt and Israel agreed to make peace with one another during the Camp David Accords. Afterwards, the Soviet General Secretary, Leonid Brezhnev, declared that "there is only one road" to a real settlement, "the road of full liberation of all Arab lands occupied by Israel in 1967, of full and unambiguous respect for the lawful rights of the Arab people of Palestine, including the right to create their own independent state." At the end of Arafat's visit to Moscow, 29 October to 1 November 1978, the Soviet authorities finally recognized the PLO as the "sole legitimate representative of the Palestinian people."

==== Syria ====
In 1966, the Arab Socialist Ba'ath Party – Syria Region gained power in a coup d'état and intended to cooperate with the USSR. The Soviet Union was willing to take every effort to guarantee stability of the new regime in Syria in order to have support from a Communist regime in the Middle East. Once this regime gained power, the USSR's activity in the Middle East intensified. The USSR encouraged the new Syrian regime and admonished Israel. The USSR wished to gain more dominance in the Middle East, so it aggravated the Arab–Israeli conflict. However, the Soviet Union did not want a war, so it acted to pacify Israel's policy towards Syria. The USSR desired to be the sole defender of the Arab world, and so did everything in its power to increase the Arab states' dependence.

On 7 April 1967, Syria executed terrorist attacks on Israel. The attacks were directed at an Israeli tractor working land in the demilitarized area on the Syrian–Israeli border. Syria and Israel exchanged fire all day. At the end of the battle, Israel had shot down seven Soviet-made Syrian Air Force aircraft. This was the first air battle between the two nations. The USSR supported Syrian attacks and blamed the violent acts on Israel. Syria did not hesitate to act because it believed that the other Arab states would support it and Israel was not capable of defeating it. In the UAR, the USSR motivated Nasser to have the UN forces leave the Sinai Peninsula and the Gaza Strip and to blockade the Straits of Tiran. Like Nasser, the USSR didn't believe that Israel would start a war on its own. Even if Israel did attack, it was unlikely that Israel would be capable of defeating the Arab states. Syria believed that, with the help of the UAR, it could beat Israel. On 11 May, the USSR warned the UAR that Israel troops were gathering on the border with Syria and that an invasion was planned for 18 May to 22 May. At this time, the USSR also began to publish accusations against Israel in order to cement the defensive unity of the UAR and Syria.

===== Syria after 1966 =====
Since 1966, Syria had obtained most of its military equipment from the Soviet Union. In 1971, when Syrian Air Force Commander Hafez al-Assad became President of Syria by way of a coup, he elected to maintain a strategic policy of close cooperation with the Soviet Union. The same year, Assad agreed to allow Soviet military personnel to keep a naval base in Tartus. In February 1972, Syria signed a peace and security pact with the Soviet Union as a means to strengthen its defense capability. During the year, Moscow delivered more than $135 million in Soviet arms to Damascus. In 1980, Syria signed a Treaty of Friendship and Cooperation with the Soviet Union.

A secret protocol to the treaty reputedly detailed Soviet military obligations to Syria and gave the USSR to power to mandate the dispatch of Soviet troops to Syria in case of an Israeli invasion. Syrian defense minister Mustafa Tlass warned in 1984 that the Soviet Union would dispatch two Soviet airborne divisions to Syria within eight hours in the event of a conflict with Israel. Tlas's has also stated that the Soviet Union would use nuclear weapons to protect Syria. Tlas's statements, however, were not endorsed by the Soviet Union. Syrian–Soviet nuclear cooperation was limited to a February 1983 agreement for cooperation and exchange for peaceful purposes. In addition to the PLO, Syria and Iraq, the Soviet Union also developed good relations with Libya, the Yemen Arab Republic, and South Yemen.

==== Iraq ====
Between 1958 and 1990, Soviet–Iraqi relations were very strong. The Soviet Union established diplomatic relations with the Kingdom of Iraq on 9 September 1944. The regime of King Faisal II was anti-communist and only established links with Moscow due its dependence on the United Kingdom and the Anglo–Soviet Treaty of 1942. In January 1955, the Soviet government criticised the Iraqi decision to join the Baghdad Pact, which led to Iraq cutting diplomatic relations with the Soviets. After Faisal II was overthrown in a military coup on 14 July 1958, the newly proclaimed Republic of Iraq led by General Abd al-Karim Qasim re-established relations with the Soviet Union, and the Soviet Union began selling arms to Iraq. In 1967, Iraq signed an agreement with the USSR to supply the nation with oil in exchange for large-scale access to Eastern Bloc arms. In 1972, Iraq, by now Moscow's closest Arab ally, signed a Treaty of Friendship and Cooperation with the Soviet Union.

==== Yemen ====
The Soviet Union was among the first group of nations to recognize North Yemen following its independence from the Ottoman Empire in 1918. On 27 December 1962, two treaties were concluded between the two countries, for setting up a study for economic projects and using soil and ground waters. In 1963, the Soviet government appointed the first ambassador to the Yemen Arab Republic (YAR) in Sana'a. In September 1963, Russians finished constructing Arrahaba International Airport. On 21 March 1964, President of YAR Abdullah Assalal paid the first visit to Moscow. The visit resulted in signing a friendship treaty between the two countries in addition to conducting economic and military relations.

In 1967, the Soviet Union immediately recognized South Yemen after it gained independence from Britain. In 1969, South Yemen became the first and only avowedly Communist nation in the Middle East. Unaccepted by Muslim nations in the region, South Yemen relied on aid from Communist nations and allowed the Soviets to keep naval bases in the country. In 1972, after a war broke out between the two neighboring Yemen states, the Yemen Arab Republic and South Yemen agreed to eventually unify. In October 1979, the Soviet Union and South Yemen officially signed a Treaty of Friendship and Cooperation. Despite the aid it now received from the United States following a brief spat with South Yemen between 1978 and 1979, the Yemen Arab Republic would not break with the Soviets and later renewed its Treaty of Friendship and Cooperation with the USSR in October 1984.

==== Libya ====
Although Libya was not as firm a Soviet ally as many Third World Marxist regimes were, Moscow developed close ties with the anti-Western regime of Muammar Gaddafi, who had overthrown Libya's pro-Western monarchy in 1969. The number-two Soviet leader at that time, Alexei Kosygin, went to Libya in 1975, and Gaddafi visited Moscow in 1976, 1981 and 1985. Soviet-Libyan trade volume during the 1970s and 1980s was approximately $100 million per year and relations between the two accelerated between the years 1981 and 1982. During this period, Moscow also supplied $4.6 billion in weaponry to Libya, providing about 90 percent of that country's arms inventory, and the Gaddafi regime assisted the Soviet Union by playing a key role in preserving the Communist regimes in both Angola and Ethiopia. According to Kommersant, "Libya was one of the Soviet Union's few partners that paid in full for the military equipment it purchased from the USSR," though the Gaddafi regime still maintained good relations with the Western nations of France and Italy and refused to sign a Treaty of Friendship and Cooperation with the Soviet Union. Libya, however, did run up a debt to Moscow during those years.

Throughout much of the Cold War, Syria and Iraq were each ruled by rival fractions of the pan-Arab Baath Party and the two nations were often tense towards one another despite their close relations with the Soviet Union. Their relationship, which had been lukewarm at best since 1963, started to change in a dramatic fashion when Mohammad Reza Pahlavi, the Shah of Iran, was overthrown in February 1979 and replaced with the pro-Islamist regime of Ayatollah Ruhollah Khomeini. After seizing power, Khomeini established a system of laws which required the mostly Shiite population of Iran to follow strict adherence to the Twelver school of thought. Assad, himself a Shiite, soon formed a strong alliance with Iran and sought to use this new relationship to greatly weaken Iraq. On 16 July 1979, Ahmed Hassan al-Bakr, who had ruled Iraq following a coup in 1968, stepped down from power and appointed his cousin Saddam Hussein, a strongly anti-Shiite Sunni, to be his successor and the Syrian government officially closed its embassy in Baghdad soon afterwards. In 1980, relations between Iraq and Syria officially broke apart when Syria declared its support for Iran during the Iran–Iraq War and Hussein, hoping to gain the advantage over Iran, expanded relations with the Western nations and recanted Iraq's previous position towards Israel. ✗ Unrelated

==== Contradictions ====
In December 1979, relations between the Soviet Union and Iraq, though still very strong in private, soured greatly in public when Iraq condemned the Soviet invasion of Afghanistan. After Iraq invaded Iran in September 1980, the Soviet Union, hoping to make Iran a new ally, cut off arms shipments to Iraq (and to Iran) as part of its efforts to induce a cease-fire. However, it also allowed Syria to continue to back Iran and ship Libyan and Eastern Bloc weapons to the country as well. While Khomeini was strongly anti-American and had demonstrated this sentiment by calling United States "the Great Satan" and taking US embassy workers hostage, he also strongly opposed the Soviet Union, labeling the communist belief a threat to Islam; and efforts by the Soviets to make Iran an ally further soured when Khomeini openly declared support the Afghan mujahideen during the Soviet–Afghan War and refused to crack down on pro-Afghan protesters who consistently attacked the USSR embassy in Tehran. In 1982, when it became clear that Iran would not align with the USSR after the Khomeini regime gained the upper hand in the Iran–Iraq War and invaded Iraqi territory, the Soviets resumed regular arm shipments to Iraq, but relations between the two nations were still politically strained and would not become strong in public again until early 1988.

After 1966, a large Soviet military presence developed in Syria. Syria eventually became the Soviet military's most favored client not only in the Middle East, but throughout the Third World as well. By mid-1984, there were an estimated 13,000 Soviet and East European advisers in Syria. Though relations still remained strong, the Soviets' stance towards Syria's support for Iran changed dramatically when Iran further advanced into Iraqi territory and drew strong ire from the Soviets as it continued to suppress members of the pro-communist Tudeh Party of Iran. As a result, many of the advisers were withdrawn in 1985 and between 2,000 and 5,000 remained by 1986. In February 1986, Iran successfully captured the Al-Faw Peninsula and the Soviet Union's stance in the Iran–Iraq War completely shifted towards Iraq.

The Soviet Union's foreign policy in the Middle East was contradictory. While the USSR first supported Israel, this relationship soon disintegrated as the Soviet Union felt threatened by Israel's need for security from the United States. The USSR turned to other Arab states in order to gain influence in the Arab world and to eliminate Western influence. The USSR viewed the Arab states as more important than Israel because they could help the USSR achieve its goal of spreading Communist influence. The USSR chose to support Egypt and Syria with arms in order to demonstrate its domination. The Soviet Union manipulated the Arab states against Israel in order to increase their dependence on the Soviet Union and to discourage Western powers from assisting Israel.

=== Americas ===
==== Cuba ====
After the establishment of diplomatic ties with the Soviet Union after the Cuban Revolution of 1959, Cuba became increasingly dependent on Soviet markets and military aid and was an ally of the Soviet Union during the Cold War. In 1972, Cuba joined the Comecon, an economic organization of states designed to create co-operation among the communist planned economies, which was dominated by its largest economy, the Soviet Union. Moscow kept in regular contact with Havana and shared varying close relations until the end of the Soviet Union in 1991. Cuba then entered an era of serious economic hardship, the Special Period.

==== Grenada ====
Diplomatic relations between Grenada and the Soviet Union were severed in November 1983 by the Governor General of Grenada. Eventually in 2002, Grenada re-established diplomatic relations with the newly formed Russian Federation.

==== United States ====
Through even the toughest and most stagnant parts of the Cold War, diplomatic relations were still kept and even sought after between the United States and the Soviet Union. Whether for peace-making reasons or for negotiations, these agreements played a vital role in the Cold War.

===== Space Race =====
Between the years 1957 and 1958, US President Dwight D. Eisenhower sought cooperative US-Soviet space initiatives through a series of letters directed at Soviet leadership. These Soviet recipients included First Secretary of the Communist Party Nikita Khrushchev and Chairman of the Council of Ministers Nikolai Bulganin. In these letters, Eisenhower suggested a protocol for peaceful space use. However, Khrushchev rejected the offer, feeling that his country was ahead of the United States in space-related technology after the successful launch of Sputnik 1 on 4 October 1957.

Despite the continued space competition between the United States and USSR, Khrushchev wrote a letter to US president John F. Kennedy detailing the possibility of future space cooperation between the two sworn rivals after American John Glenn became the first American to orbit Earth on 20 February 1962. These discussions between the Soviet Union and the United States led to cooperation in three areas: weather data and future meteorology-related launches, the mapping of the geomagnetic field of the Earth, and the relay of communication.

The reaction to the United States landing the first humans on the Moon in the Soviet Union was mixed. The Soviet government limited the release of information about the lunar landing, which affected the reaction. A portion of the populace did not give it any attention, and another portion was angered by it.

=== India ===
The relationship between the Soviet Union and India was a significant part of the Cold War. Both political and scientific in nature, this cooperation lasted for nearly 40 years. Over this span of nearly four decades, Soviet-Indian relations maintained through three pairs of leaders—Jawaharlal Nehru and Nikita Khrushchev, Indira Gandhi and Leonid Brezhnev, and Rajiv Gandhi and Mikhail Gorbachev. This Indo-Soviet relationship can be seen being stemmed from India's distrust and general unsatisfactory feeling towards Dwight D. Eisenhower's administration's insistence that Third World countries could not remain neutral during the Cold War and with American hesitation to consult with their governments on issues pertinent to these countries.

India's pro-Soviet stance was professed when the government of Indira Gandhi broke with the rest of the non-communist world to embrace and support the Soviet invasion of Afghanistan at the UN General Assembly, despite earlier comments criticizing the operation. The former ambassador, Inder Kumar Gujral, commented that the deep involvement of Pakistan in mobilizing the Afghan mujahideen was a concern for Indian security and stability, while also expressing India's "friendship" with the Soviets. India was also the only country outside the Soviet bloc to fully recognize the People's Republic of Kampuchea after the Vietnamese invasion of Cambodia.

==== Space cooperation ====
Scientific cooperation between the Soviet Union and India began with the formal establishment of an Indo-Soviet Joint Committee of Scientists, which held its first meeting in January 1968.

The Soviet Union was a major contributor to India's space effort. Most notably, Soviet technical assistance in design and launching was paramount to the success of Indian satellites Aryabhata, Bhaskara-I and Bhaskara-II. When considering India's reputation for poverty and food insecurity at the time, outsiders began to wonder if India belonged to such a prestigious group of nations, or if it was only given the opportunity by the Soviet Union.

Work on A'ryabhata began following an agreement between the Indian Space Research Organization and the USSR Academy of Sciences in May 1972. On 19 April 1975, less than one year after India's first successful nuclear bomb test on 18 May 1974, the Soviet Union helped launch India's first satellite Aryabhata from Kapustin Yar, a Russian rocket launch and development site in Astrakhan Oblast using a Kosmos-3M launch vehicle. It was built by the ISRO, but the Soviets provided technical assistance and components such as solar cells, batteries, thermal paints, and tape recorders to aid in its proposed 6 month solar and atmospheric studies. Though the satellite was expected to perform solar and atmospheric studies for 6 months, the experiments had to be closed down after 5 days due to a power supply problem.

On 7 June 1979, Bhaskara-I was launched from Kapustin Yar aboard the C-1 Intercosmos Launch Vehicle.

On 20 November 1981, Bhaskara-II was launched, providing nearly two thousand photos for ocean and land surface data.

In April 1985, the Indian National Science Academy and the Soviet Academy of Sciences signed an agreement for joint research in applied mathematics and technology such as computer electronics, biotechnology, and silicon technology. On 21 March 1987, following Rajiv Gandhi's visit to the Soviet Union, a protocol for cooperation in science and technology were signed, leading to new initiatives in laser technology, alternative energy sources, and electron accelerators.

=== Break with China ===
The Sino-Soviet split (1956–1966) was the breaking of political relations between the People's Republic of China (PRC) and the USSR, caused by doctrinal divergences that arose from their different interpretations and practical applications of Marxism–Leninism, as influenced by their respective geopolitics during the Cold War. In the late 1950s and early 1960s, Sino-Soviet debates about the interpretation of Orthodox Marxism became specific disputes about the Soviet Union's policies of national de-Stalinization and international peaceful coexistence with the Western world. Against that political background, the international relations of the PRC featured official belligerence towards the West, and an initial, public rejection of the Soviet Union's policy of peaceful coexistence between the Eastern and Western blocs, which Mao Zedong said was Marxist revisionism by the Russian Communists.

Beginning in 1956, after Nikita Khrushchev denounced Stalin and Stalinism in the speech On the Cult of Personality and its Consequences (25 February 1956), the PRC and the USSR had progressively divergent interpretations of Marxist ideology; by 1961, their intractable differences of ideologic interpretation and praxis provoked the PRC's formal denunciation of Soviet communism as the work of "revisionist traitors" in the USSR. Among the Eastern Bloc countries, the Sino-Soviet split was about who would lead the revolution for world communism, China or Russia, and to whom would the vanguard parties of the world turn for political advice, financial aid, and military assistance. In that vein, the USSR and the PRC competed for ideological leadership through the communist parties native to the countries in their spheres of influence.

The Sino-Soviet split transformed the geopolitics of the bi-polar cold war into a tri-polar cold war, and facilitated Sino-American rapprochement and the 1972 Nixon visit to China. It ended the era of "monolithic communism". Historically, the ideological Sino-Soviet split facilitated the Marxist–Leninist Realpolitik by which Mao established the tri-polar geopolitics (PRC-USA-USSR) of the late-period Cold War.

Historian Lorenz M. Lüthi said:

The Sino–Soviet split was one of the key events of the Cold War, equal in importance to the construction of the Berlin Wall, the Cuban Missile Crisis, the Second Vietnam War, and Sino-American Rapprochement. The split helped to determine the framework of the second half of the Cold War in general, and influenced the course of the Second Vietnam War, in particular. Like a nasty divorce, it left bad memories and produced myths of innocence on both sides.

=== Relations with Southeast Asian states ===
The Soviet Union gradually became heavily involved in the contest for influence in Southeast Asia. Although the Soviet Union is usually associated with its diplomatic support for North Vietnam during the Vietnam War, it also played a significant role in other Southeast Asian countries. Prior to the rise of President Suharto, the Soviet Union's largest recipient of arms aid between 1958 and 1965 was Indonesia.

== The 1970s onward ==
In the 1970s, the Soviet Union achieved rough nuclear parity with the United States, and surpassed it by the end of that decade with the deployment of the SS-18 missile. It perceived its own involvement as essential to the solution of any major international problem. Meanwhile, the Cold War gave way to Détente and a more complicated pattern of international relations in which the world was no longer clearly split into two clearly opposed blocs. Less powerful countries had more room to assert their independence, and the two superpowers were partially able to recognize their common interest in trying to check the further spread and proliferation of nuclear weapons (see SALT I, SALT II, Anti-Ballistic Missile Treaty).

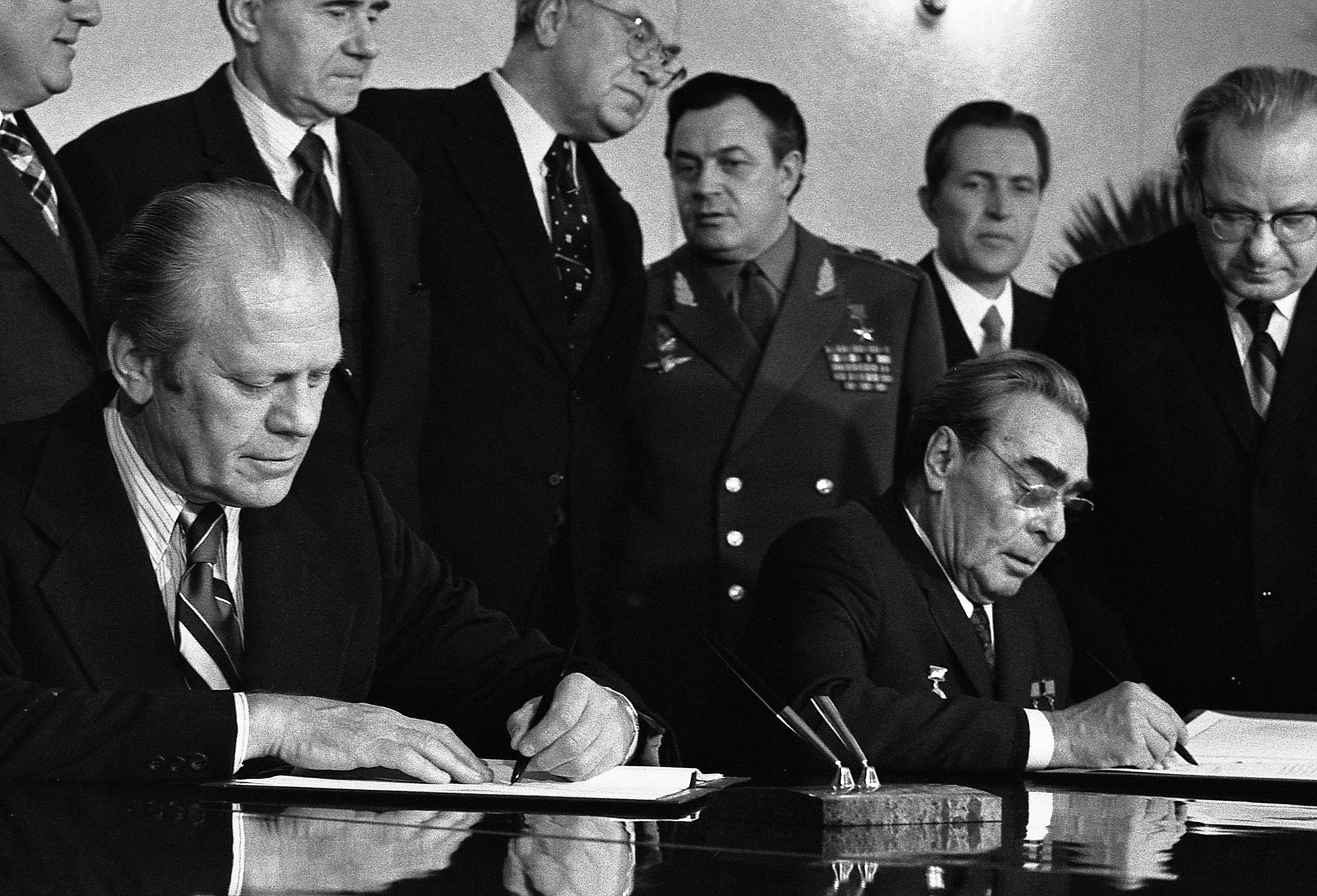
Leonid Brezhnev meets with Gerald Ford in Vladivostok in November 1974 to sign a joint communiqué on the SALT treaty.

Elsewhere the Soviet Union had concluded friendship and cooperation treaties with a number of states in the non-communist world, especially among Third World and Non-Aligned Movement states. Notwithstanding some ideological obstacles, Moscow advanced state interests by gaining military footholds in strategically important areas throughout the Third World. Furthermore, the USSR continued to provide military aid for revolutionary movements in the Third World. For all these reasons, Soviet foreign policy was of major importance to the non-communist world and helped determine the tenor of international relations.

Although myriad bureaucracies were involved in the formation and execution of Soviet foreign policy, the major policy guidelines were determined by the Politburo of the Communist Party. The foremost objectives of Soviet foreign policy had been the maintenance and enhancement of national security and the maintenance of hegemony over Eastern Europe. Relations with the United States and Western Europe were also of major concern to Soviet foreign policy makers and, much as with the United States, relations with individual Third World states were at least partly determined by the proximity of each state to the border and to estimates of strategic significance.

== Gorbachev and after ==
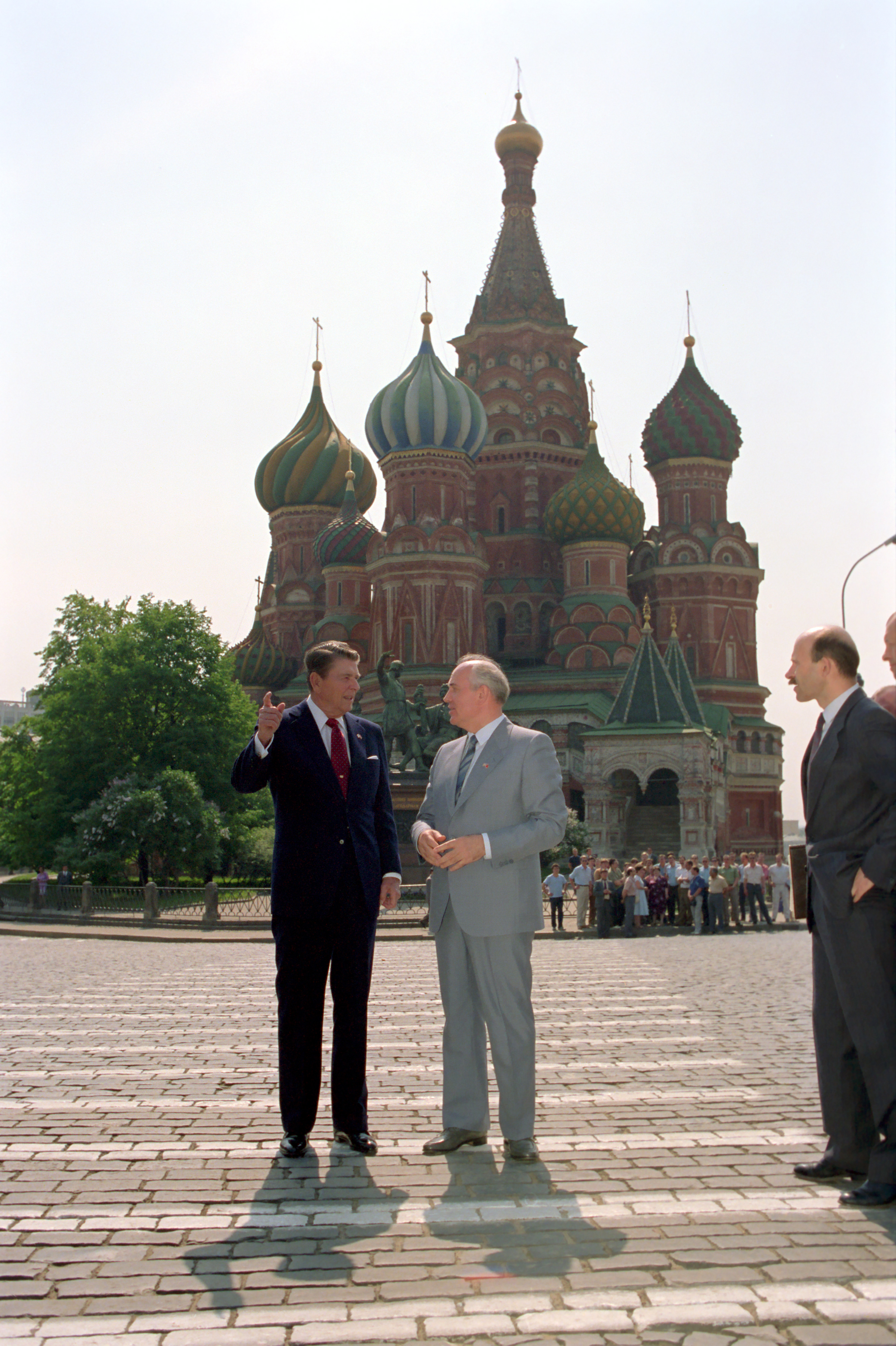
Gorbachev and Reagan in Moscow during the Moscow Summit, 31 May 1988

When Mikhail Gorbachev succeeded Konstantin Chernenko as General Secretary of the Communist Party in 1985, it signaled a dramatic change in Soviet foreign policy. Gorbachev put forth the doctrine of "new political thinking", which in part pursued conciliatory policies toward the West instead of maintaining the Cold War status quo. The USSR exited Afghanistan after its unsuccessful 10-year war against the country, signed strategic arms reduction treaties with the United States. It did not attempt to stop the successful effort of all the East European satellite nations to declare their independence and expel the Soviet Union-dominated leadership, issues about the status and borders of Germany were addressed in 1990, when the Soviet Union, along with the United States, Britain and France, signed a treaty on German reunification with the two German governments. After extensive negotiations, West Germany absorbed East Germany, with large cash payments made to Moscow. After the final dissolution of the Soviet Union on 26 December 1991, Russia became the legal successor to the Soviet Union on the international stage, and in terms of treaties and agreements. Under Boris Yeltsin, Russian foreign policy solicited Western support for capitalist reforms in post-Soviet Russia.

== Foreign relations of the post-Soviet states ==
- Armenia
- Azerbaijan
- Belarus
- Estonia
- (Georgia (country)) Georgia
- Kazakhstan
- Kyrgyzstan
- Latvia
- Lithuania
- Moldova
- Russia
- Tajikistan
- Turkmenistan
- Ukraine
- Uzbekistan

== See also ==
- Foreign relations of Russia
- History of the Soviet Union
- History of Sino-Russian relations
  - Sino-Soviet split
- Soviet Union § Foreign relations
- Soviet Union–United States relations
- Foreign relations of Nazi Germany, 1933-1941
- Diplomatic history of World War II
- Ministry of External Relations
- Bibliography of the Russian Revolution and Civil War § Foreign policy
- Bibliography of the Russian Revolution and Civil War § International involvement in the Revolution and Civil War
- Bibliography of Stalinism and the Soviet Union § Foreign policy and external relations
- Bibliography of the Post Stalinist Soviet Union § Foreign policy
- Dates of establishment of diplomatic relations with the USSR
