= Stalin ministry =

Stalin ministry may refer to:

- Stalin's first government (1941–1946), headed by Joseph Stalin
- Stalin's second government (1946–1950), headed by Joseph Stalin
- Stalin's third government (1950–1953), headed by Joseph Stalin
- M. K. Stalin ministry (2021–2026), headed by M. K. Stalin in Tamil Nadu, India
