= Dmitry Onika =

Dmitry Grigoryevich Onika

People's Commissar of Coal Industry of Western Regions of the USSR
- In office January 19, 1946 – March 15, 1946
- Preceded by: Position established
- Succeeded by: Position abolished

Minister of Coal Industry of Western Regions of the USSR
- In office March 19, 1946 – January 17, 1947
- Preceded by: Position established
- Succeeded by: Alexander Zasyadko

Minister of Coal Industry of Eastern Regions of the USSR
- In office January 17, 1947 – December 28, 1948
- Preceded by: Vasily Vakhrushev
- Succeeded by: Position abolished

Personal details
- Born: November 21, 1910 Kremenchug, Poltava Governorate,
- Died: September 3, 1968 (aged 57) Moscow, USSR
- Party: Communist Party of the Soviet Union (from 1930)
- Education: Moscow Mining Institute
- Profession: Mining engineer, electrical engineer
- Awards: Order of Lenin Order of the Red Banner of Labour Medal "For the Defence of Stalingrad" Medal "For the Victory over Germany in the Great Patriotic War 1941–1945"

Military service
- Allegiance: USSR
- Rank: Brigadier Engineer; Colonel of Engineering and Technical Service
- Commands: 8th Sapper Army Southern Front

Dmitry Grigoryevich Onika (November 21, 1910, Kremenchug, Poltava Governorate — September 3, 1968, Moscow) was a Soviet state official, organizer of the Ministry of Coal Industry, Doctor of Technical Sciences (1954), Professor (1965), and Deputy of the Supreme Soviet of the 4th and 5th Soviet convocations from 1954 to 1962.

== Biography ==
He was born on November 21, 1910, in the city of Kremenchug, Poltava Governorate, into a Russian working-class family. From 1920 to 1921, he worked as a farmhand and shepherd in the Poltava Governorate. Then, he became homeless. In 1924, he became an apprentice of a housekeeper at a workshop in Kremenchug. From 1925 to 1928, he was a student at the vocational school of the wagon-building plant in the village of Kryukovo, Moscow Region. He worked as an assistant steam engine operator at a timber processing plant in Kryukovo from 1928 until 1929. From 1929 to 1930, he studied, preparing for higher education at the Zhytomyr Pedagogical Institute, now known as Zhytomyr Ivan Franko State University.

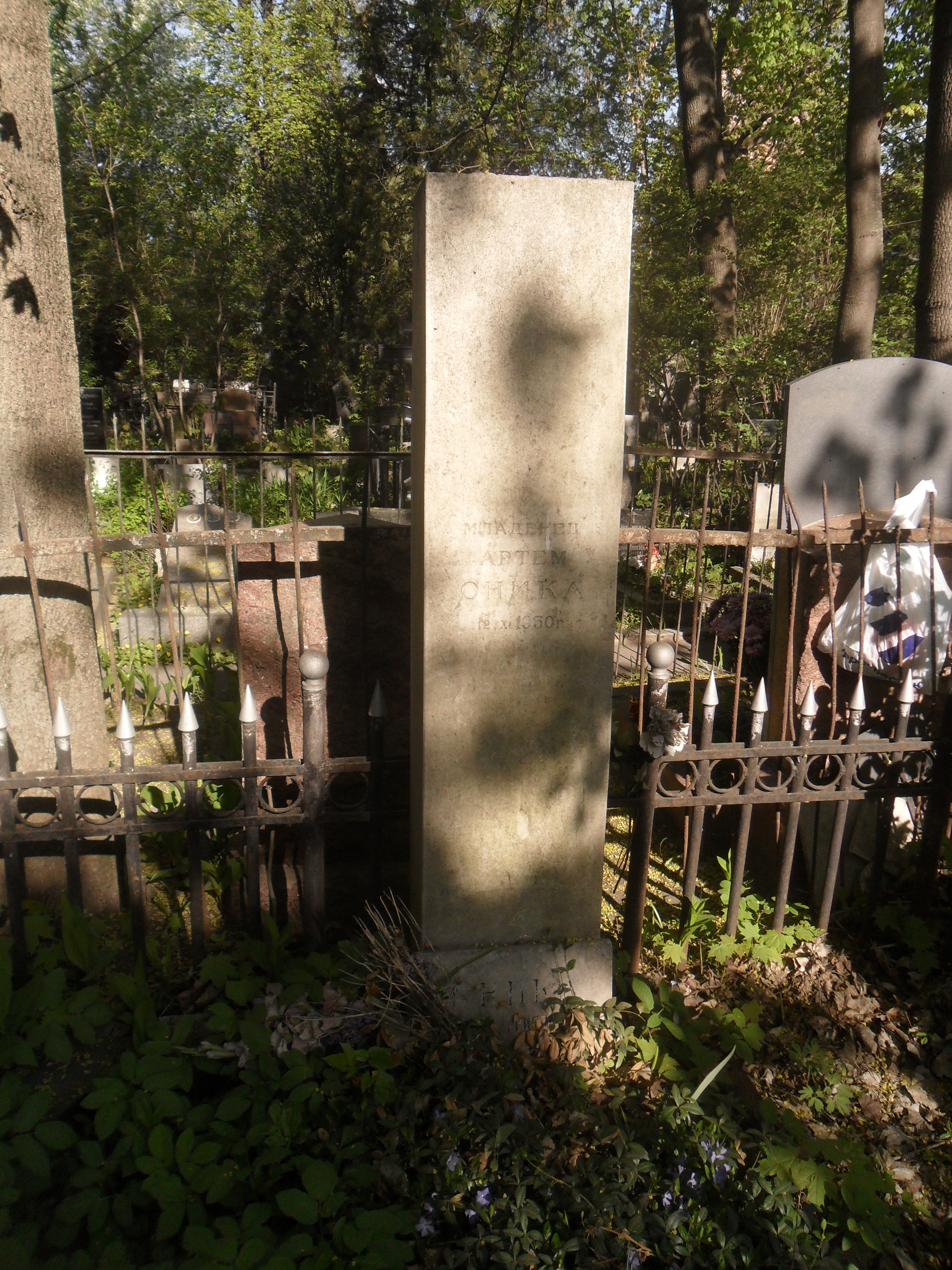
Grave of Onika at the Novodevichy Cemetery in Moscow.

In 1930, he entered the Moscow Mining Academy and joined the Communist Party of the Soviet Union in April of the same year. Due to the division of the Moscow Mining Academy into six universities in May 1930, he graduated from the Moscow Mining Institute (now the Mining Institute of MISiS) with a degree in mining engineering and electrical engineering in 1938.

From 1939 to 1957, he worked in various leadership positions in the coal industry of the USSR: Head of the Main Department, Deputy People's Commissar, Head of the Moscow Coal Combine (1942–45).

From 1946 to 1947, he was the Minister of Coal Industry of the Western, then Eastern regions of the USSR. He also became the first deputy minister of the coal industry of the USSR in 1948.

On September 10, 1947, at the suggestion of the Ministers of Coal Industry Onika and Alexander Zasyadko, his successor, the Miner's Day holiday was officially approved in the USSR.

During the Great Patriotic War from October 1941 to January 1942, Brigadier Engineer Onika was the commander of the 8th Sapper Army of the Southern Front which was involved in the construction of defensive structures near Donbass and Stalingrad. After the war, he held the rank of Colonel of the Engineering and Technical Service (1950).

He made a significant contribution to the housing and socio-cultural development of the city of Stalingorsk, known since 1961 as Novomoskovsk). In 1953, he initiated the construction of the children's railway in the city. At his initiative, mining settlements such as Kamenetsky, Dubovka, Rudnev, Kazanovka, and many others were built in the city, landscaping of roads leading from Novomoskovsk to Uzlovaya, Severo-Zadonsk, and Donskoy was carried out, and the Stalinogorsk television center was created.

In 1954, he defended his dissertation for the degree of Doctor of Technical Sciences.

From 1957 to 1959, he headed the Karaganda Regional Economic Council. As he was connected with the uprising in Temirtau, in 1959, he was expelled from the party, removed from his position, and appointed the manager of the Sokolovrudstroy trust in the Kazakh Soviet Socialist Republic. From 1962 to 1964, he was the director of the Institute of Labor in Moscow. From 1965 onwards, he worked in the State Planning Committee and the State Supply Committee of the USSR, engaging in scientific and teaching activities. He conducted theoretical and experimental research on the creation of mining combines for conducting mining operations.

He died in a car accident on September 3, 1968, in Moscow. He is buried at the Novodevichy Cemetery. In 1995, Onika was posthumously awarded the title of Honorary Citizen of the city of Novomoskovsk.

== Literature ==
- Onika D. G. (1945). Restoration of the Moscow Coal Basin. Economy in the Service of the Fatherland War. Moscow: Gosplanizdat. p. 111.
- Onika D. G. (1945). Moscow Suburban Coal Stoking. Moscow: Moskovsky Bolshevik. p. 122.
- Onika D. G. (1956). Moscow Coal Basin (1855—1955). Moscow: Moskovsky Rabochy. p. 235.
- Onika D. G. (1956). Coal Industry of the USSR in the Sixth Five-Year Plan. Moscow: Ugletekhizdat. p. 71.
- Onika D. G. (1959). Horizontal Mining Operations. Moscow: Gosgortekhizdat. p. 472.

Co-authored:

- Onika D. G., ed. (1963). Issues of Production and Labour Organization. Materials of an International Conference. Moscow.
- Onika D. G., Dokukin A. V. (1967). Coal Industry of the People's Republic of Poland. Moscow.

Published posthumously:

- Onika D. G. (1969). Excavation of Mine Openings. Moscow: Nedra. p. 480.
- Onika D. (1972). Excavation of Mine Openings. p. 460.

== Awards ==
- Three Orders of Lenin
- Three Orders of the Red Banner of Labour
- Order of the Red Star

== Bibliography ==
- Compiled by V. I. Ivkin, ed. (1999). State Power of the USSR. Supreme Authorities and Their Leaders. 1923—1991. Moscow: Rossiyskaya Politicheskaya Entsiklopediya. ISBN 5-8243-0014-3.
- Honorary Citizens of Novomoskovsk: Biobibliographic Dictionary / Eds.: A. E. Prorokov, N. N. Tarasova, E. V. Bogatyrev, A. V. Polishina, N. V. Pavlova, S. G. Zmeeva. – 2nd ed., revised and enlarged. – Novomoskovsk: LLC "Rekom", 2010. – 84 p.
- Great Patriotic War. Commanders: Military Biographical Dictionary / Collective authors; Ed. by M. G. Vozhakin. — Moscow; Zhukovsky: Kuchkovo Pole, 2005. — 408 p. — ISBN 5-86090-113-5.
