= Miterev =

Miterev is a surname. Notable people with the surname include:

- Anton Miterev (born 1996), Russian football player
- Georgy Miterev (1900–1977), Soviet scientist and politician
- Iurie Miterev (1975–2012), Moldovan football player
