= Stalin's second government =

Government of the Soviet Union

- 12th government of the Soviet Union

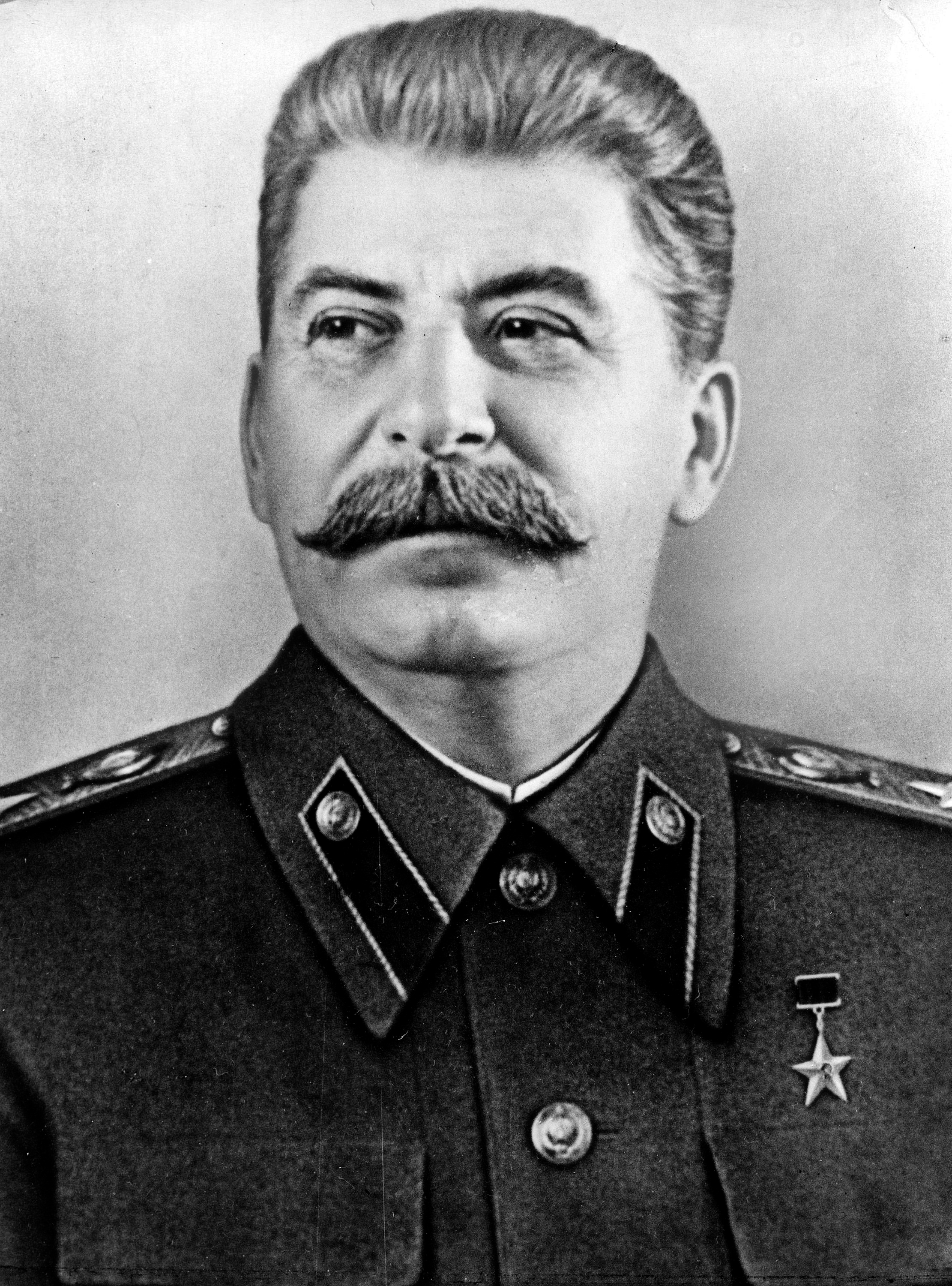
- Date formed: March 19, 1946
- Date dissolved: March 12, 1950

People and organisations
- Head of state: Nikolai Shvernik
- Head of government: President of the Sovmin
- Deputy head of government: Vyacheslav Molotov
- No. of ministers: 56
- Member party: All-Union Communist Party (Bolshevik)
- Status in legislature: Second Convocation of the Supreme Soviet of the Soviet Union

History
- Election: 1946 Soviet Union legislative election
- Outgoing election: 1950 Soviet Union legislative election
- Predecessor: Stalin I
- Successor: Stalin III

Stalin's second government was formally constituted on March 19, 1946, with Joseph Stalin at the helm as the head of government and Chairman of the Council of Ministers of the Soviet Union, this cabinet was inaugurated through a decree of the second convocation of the Supreme Soviet of the Soviet Union issued earlier on March 15, 1946. This decree also signified the renaming of the Council of People's Commissars to the Council of Ministers.

== Government policies ==
While the responsibilities and functions of the Council of Ministers' members remained unchanged from those of the Council of People's Commissars, the modification in nomenclature was aimed at aligning with international conventions. The second convocation of the Supreme Soviet of the Soviet Union, convened on February 10, 1946, played the pivotal role in approving the formation of the Council of Ministers of the USSR on March 19, 1946.

The Council of Ministers, under Stalin's leadership, spearheaded the implementation of the fourth five-year plan of economic development spanning 1946 to 1950. Stalin's directive on February 9, 1946, emphasized the restoration of war-affected regions, the resurgence of industry and agriculture to pre-war levels, and the subsequent transition to a more expansive or significantly reduced growth rate.

In a pivotal move in December 1947, the Council of Ministers of the USSR executed the second monetary reform in Soviet history, characterized by the redenomination of Soviet currency. Simultaneously, the reform dismantled rationing for food and consumer goods. This nationwide reform unfolded within a week, extending to two weeks in remote Northern areas.

In October 1948, the Council of Ministers and the Central Committee of the Communist Party of the Soviet Union outlined a comprehensive plan for windbreak planting, crop rotation pastures, and the construction of ponds and lakes The plan, known as the Great Plan for the Transformation of Nature, also aimed at ensuring high crop yields in the steppe and forest-steppe regions of the European territories of the Soviet Union.

The Soviet Union successfully developed the atomic bomb on August 29, 1949, becoming the world's second nuclear-armed nation. This achievement brought an end to the American nuclear monopoly, marking a turning point in the global balance of power.

== Ministries ==
Ministry	Minister	Party
Chairman of the Council of Ministers	Joseph Stalin	PCU (b)
First Deputy Chairman of the Council of Ministers	Vyacheslav Molotov	PCU (b)
Deputy Chairmen of the Council of Ministers	Lavrenti Beria	PCU (b)
Deputy Chairmen of the Council of Ministers	Andrei Andreyev	PCU (b)
Deputy Chairmen of the Council of Ministers	Nikolai Bulganin	PCU (b)
Deputy Chairmen of the Council of Ministers	Nikolai Voznesensky	PCU (b)
Deputy Chairmen of the Council of Ministers	Kliment Voroshilov	PCU (b)
Deputy Chairmen of the Council of Ministers	Aleksandr Yefremov (politician)	PCU (b)
Deputy Chairmen of the Council of Ministers	Lazar Kaganovich	PCU (b)
Deputy Chairmen of the Council of Ministers	Alexei Kosygin	PCU (b)
Deputy Chairmen of the Council of Ministers	Alexei Krutikov	PCU (b)
Deputy Chairmen of the Council of Ministers	Georgy Malenkov	PCU (b)
Deputy Chairmen of the Council of Ministers	Vyacheslav Malyshev	PCU (b)
Deputy Chairmen of the Council of Ministers	Anastas Mikoyan	PCU (b)
Deputy Chairmen of the Council of Ministers	Maksim Saburov	PCU (b)
Deputy Chairmen of the Council of Ministers	Ivan Tevosian	PCU (b)
Administrator of Affairs	Yakov Chadeiev (1946–1949)	PCU (b)
Administrator of Affairs	Mikhail Pomaznev (1949–1950)	PCU (b)
Minister of Foreign Affairs	Vyacheslav Molotov (1946–1949)	PCU (b)
Minister of Foreign Affairs	Andrey Vyshinsky (1949–1950)	PCU (b)
Minister of Defense	Joseph Stalin (1946–1947)	PCU (b)
Minister of Defense	Nikolai Bulganin (1947–1949)	PCU (b)
Minister of Defense	Alexander Vasilevsky (1949–1950)	PCU (b)
Minister of Foreign Trade	Anastas Mikoyan (1946–1949)	PCU (b)
Minister of Foreign Trade	Mikhail Menshikov (1949–1950)	PCU (b)
Minister of Food Industry	Vasili Zotov (1949–1949)	PCU (b)
Minister of Food Industry	Dmitri Pavlov (1949–1950)	PCU (b)
Minister of Trade	Alexander Liubimov (1946–1948)	PCU (b)
Minister of Trade	Vasily Zhavoronkov (1948–1950)	PCU (b)
Minister of Railways	Ivan Kovalev (1946–1948)	PCU (b)
Minister of Railways	Boris Beshev (1948–1950)	PCU (b)
Minister of Communications	Konstantin Sergeychuk (1946–1948)	PCU (b)
Minister of Communications	Nikolay Psurtsev (1948–1950)	PCU (b)
Minister of Timber Industry	Mikhail Saltikov (1946–1947)	PCU (b)
Minister of Timber Industry	Georgi Orlov (1947–1948)	PCU (b)
Ministry of Timber and Paper Industry	Georgi Orlov (1946–1947)	PCU (b)
Ministry of Timber and Paper Industry	Sergei Komarov (1947–1948)	PCU (b)
Minister of Timber and Paper Industry	Georgi Orlov (1948–1950)	PCU (b)
Minister of Light Industry	Sergei Lukin (1946–1947)	PCU (b)
Minister of Light Industry	Nikolai Ermolaevich (1947–1948)	PCU (b)
Minister of Light Industry	Alexei Kosygin (1948–1950)	PCU (b)
Minister of Aviation Industry	Mikhail Khrunichev	PCU (b)
Minister of Naval Industry	Alexei Goregliad (1946–1950)	PCU (b)
Minister of Naval Industry	Vyacheslav Malyshev (1950)	PCU (b)
Minister of Armaments	Dmitri Ustinov	PCU (b)
Minister of Agricultural Electrical Engineering	Boris Vannikov (1946)	PCU (b)
Minister of Agricultural Electrical Engineering	Piotr Goremykin (1946–1950)	PCU (b)
Minister of Construction and Special Works	Nikolai Kazakov	PCU (b)
Minister of Automotive Industry	Stepan Akopov	PCU (b)
Minister of Agricultural and Automotive Machinery	Stepan Akopov	PCU (b)
Minister of Mechanics and Tools	Pyotr Parshin	PCU (b)
Minister of Ferrous Metallurgy	Ivan Tevosian (1946–1948)	PCU (b)
Minister of Non-Ferrous Metallurgy	Pyotr Lomako (1948–1948)	PCU (b)
Minister of Metallurgical Industry	Ivan Tevosian (1948–1950)	PCU (b)
Minister of Eastern Petroleum Industry (1946–1948)	Mikhail Evseenko	PCU (b)
Minister of Western and Southern Petroleum Industry (1946–1948)	Nikolai Baibakov	PCU (b)
Minister of Petroleum Industry	Nikolai Baibakov	PCU (b)
Minister of Eastern Coal Industry	Vasily Vakhrushev (1946–1947)	PCU (b)
Minister of Eastern Coal Industry	Dmitry Onika (1947–1948)	PCU (b)
Minister of Western Coal Industry	Dmitry Onika (1946–1947)	PCU (b)
Minister of Western Coal Industry	Alexander Zasyadko (1947–1948)	PCU (b)
Minister of Coal Industry	Alexander Zasyadko	PCU (b)
Minister of Electrical Industry	Ivan Kabanov	PCU (b)
Minister of Energy	Dmitri Zhimerin	PCU (b)
Minister of Chemical Industry	Mikhail Pervukhin (1946–1950)	PCU (b)
Minister of Chemical Industry	Sergei Tikhomirov (1950)	PCU (b)
Minister of Rubber Industry	Tijon Mitrojin	PCU (b)
Minister of Building Materials Industry	Lazar Kaganovich (1946–1947)	PCU (b)
Minister of Building Materials Industry	Simon Ginzburg (1947–1950)	PCU (b)
Minister of Transport Engineering	Vyacheslav Malyshev (1946–1947)	PCU (b)
Minister of Transport Engineering	Ivan Nosenko (1947–1950)	PCU (b)
Minister of Transport Engineering	Yuri Maksarev (1950)	PCU (b)
Minister of Construction and Mechanical Engineering	Konstantin Sokolov (1946–1949)	PCU (b)
Minister of Construction and Mechanical Engineering	Semion Fomin (1949–1950)	PCU (b)
Minister of Finance	Arseny Zverev (1946–1948)	PCU (b)
Minister of Finance	Alexei Kosygin (1948)	PCU (b)
Minister of Finance	Arseny Zverev (1948–1950)	PCU (b)
Minister of Agriculture	Ivan Benediktov	PCU (b)
Minister of Maritime Transport	Piotr Shirshov (1946–1948)	PCU (b)
Minister of Maritime Transport	Alexandr Afanasiev (1948)	PCU (b)
Minister of Maritime Transport	Nikolai Novikov (1948–1950)	PCU (b)
Minister of River Transport	Zosima Shashkov	PCU (b)
Minister of Internal Affairs	Sergey Kruglov	PCU (b)
Minister of Health	Georgy Miterev (1946–1947)	PCU (b)
Minister of Health	Yefim Smirnov (1947–1950)	PCU (b)
Minister of Justice	Nikolai Ryshkov (1946–1948)	PCU (b)
Minister of Justice	Konstantin Gorshenin (1948–1950)	PCU (b)
Minister of Supply	Boris Dvinski	PCU (b)
Minister of Industrial Plants	Nikolai Skvortsov	PCU (b)
Minister of Textile Industry	Ivan Sedin	PCU (b)
Minister of Fishing Industry	Alexander Ishkov (1946, 1948–1950)	PCU (b)
Minister of Fishing Industry	Konstantin Rusakov (1950)	PCU (b)
Minister of Eastern Fisheries Industry (1946–1948)	Andrei Semionovich	PCU (b)
Minister of Western Fisheries Industry (1946–1948)	Alexander Ishkov	PCU (b)
Minister of Meat and Dairy Industry	Pavel Smirnov (1946)	PCU (b)
Minister of Meat and Dairy Industry	Ivan Kuzminy (1946–1950)	PCU (b)
Minister of State Security	Vsevolod Merkulov (1946)	PCU (b)
Minister of State Security	Viktor Abakumov (1946–1950)	PCU (b)
Minister of Military Construction and Naval Works	Simon Ginzburg (1946–1947)	PCU (b)
Minister of Military Construction and Naval Works	Nikolai Dygai (1947–1949)	PCU (b)
Minister of Construction Engineering	Nikolai Dygai (1949–1950)	PCU (b)
Minister of Fuel Industry	Alexander Zademidko	PCU (b)
Minister of Heavy Industry	Pavel Yudin	PCU (b)
Minister of Higher Education	Sergei Kaftanov	PCU (b)
Minister of Construction Tools-Machines	Alexander Yefremov (1946–1949)	PCU (b)
Minister of Construction Tools-Machines	Anatoly Kostounov (1949–1950)	PCU (b)
Minister of State Control	Lev Mekhlis	PCU (b)
Minister of the State Committee on Cinematography	Ivan Bolshakov	PCU (b)
Minister of Labor and Employment	Vasily Pronin	PCU (b)
Minister of Communication Equipment Industry	Ivan Zubovich (1946–1947)	PCU (b)
Minister of Communication Equipment Industry	Alekseenko Gennady (1947–1950)	PCU (b)
Minister of Pharmaceutical Industry	Andrei Tretiakov	PCU (b)
Minister of Consumer Goods	Nikolai Pronin	PCU (b)
Minister of Livestock Production	Alexei Kozlov	PCU (b)
Minister of Forestry	German Motovilov (1947–1948)	PCU (b)
Minister of Forestry	Alexander Bovin (1948–1953)	PCU (b)
Minister of Geology	Ivan Malyshev (1946–1949)	PCU (b)
Minister of Geology	Piotr Zajarov (1949–1950)	PCU (b)
Minister of Food and Material Reserves	Dmitri Fomin	PCU (b)
Minister of Urban Construction	Konstantin Sokolov (1949)	PCU (b)
Minister of Urban Construction	George Popov (1949–1950)	PCU (b)
Minister of Gosbank	Yakov Golev (1946–1948)	PCU (b)
Minister of Gosbank	Vasily Popov (1948–1950)	PCU (b)
Minister of State Planning Committee	Nikolai Voznesensky (1946–1949)	PCU (b)
Minister of State Planning Committee	Maksim Saburov (1949–1950)	PCU (b)

Government offices
Preceded by Stalin I	Governments of the Soviet Union; March 19, 1946 – March 12, 1950	Succeeded by Stalin III
