= Stalin's first government =

Government of the Soviet Union

- 11th government of the Soviet Union

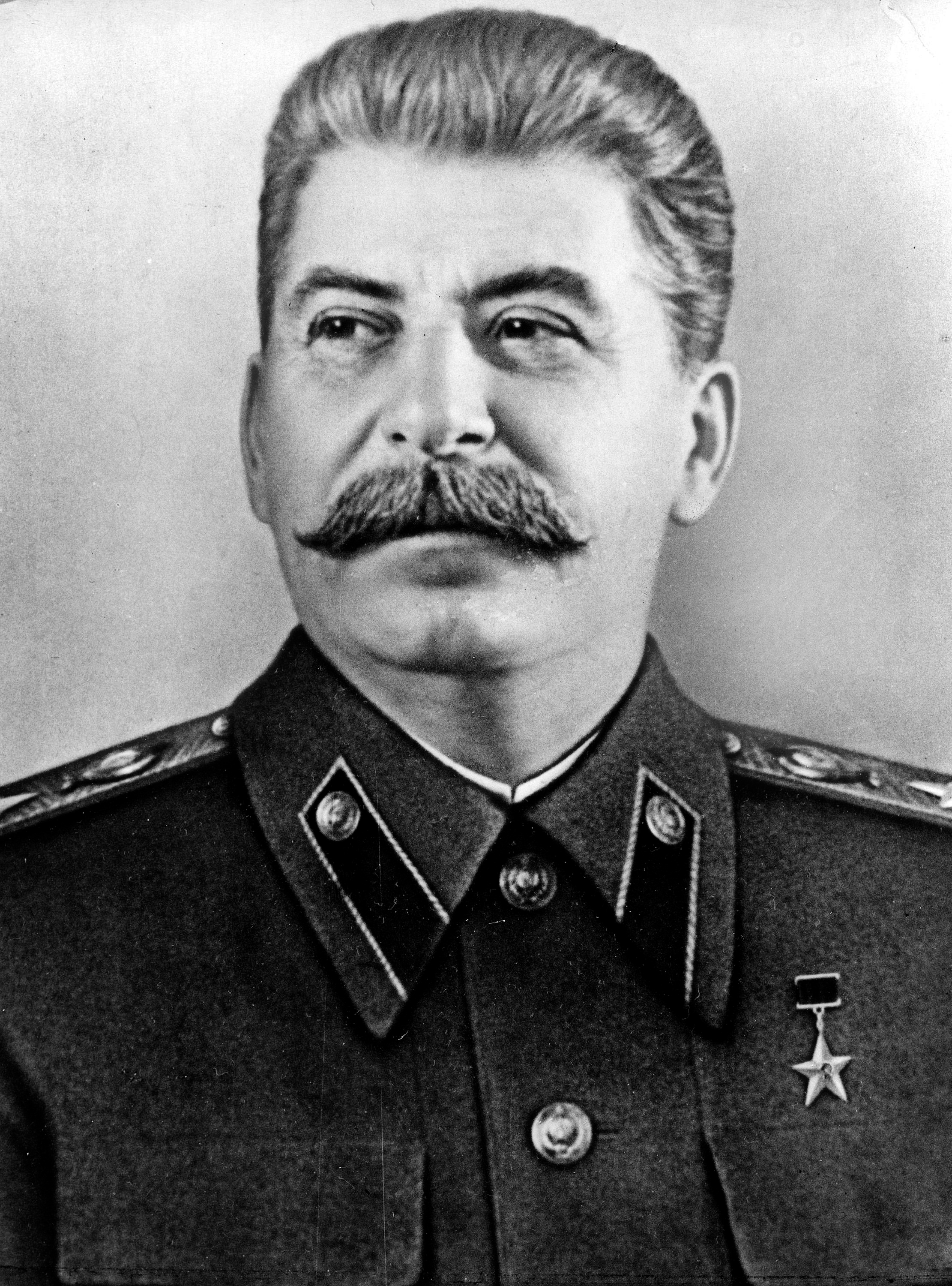
- Date formed: 7 May 1941
- Date dissolved: 15 March 1946

People and organisations
- Head of state: Mikhail Kalinin
- Head of government: Joseph Stalin
- Deputy head of government: Vyacheslav Molotov
- No. of ministers: 56
- Member party: All-Union Communist Party (Bolshevik)
- Status in legislature: One Party State

History
- Election: 1937 Soviet Union legislative election
- Outgoing election: 1946 Soviet Union legislative election
- Predecessor: Molotov IV
- Successor: Stalin II

Stalin's first government was created on 7 May 1941 and was dissolved on 15 March 1946, with the creation of Stalin's second government. It was the government throughout the Great Patriotic War.

== Ministries ==
The government consisted of:

Some periods in the table below start before 7 May 1941 or end after 15 March 1946 because the minister was in previous or later governments.

Ministry	Minister	Took office	Left office
Chairman of the Council of Peoples' Commissars	Joseph Stalin	6 May 1941	5 March 1953
First Deputy Chairman of the Council of Peoples' Commissars	Vyacheslav Molotov	16 August 1942	15 July 1964
Deputy Chairman of the Council of Peoples' Commissars	Vyacheslav Molotov	7 May 1941	16 August 1942
Deputy Chairman of the Council of Peoples' Commissars	Anastas Mikoyan	7 May 1941	15 March 1946
Deputy Chairman of the Council of Peoples' Commissars	Lazar Kaganovich	7 May 1941	15 March 1946
Deputy Chairman of the Council of Peoples' Commissars	Nikolai Voznesenski	7 May 1941	15 March 1946
Deputy Chairman of the Council of Peoples' Commissars	Andrey Vyshinsky	7 May 1941	1 January 1944
Deputy Chairman of the Council of Peoples' Commissars	Rosalia Zemlyachka	7 May 1941	1 January 1943
Deputy Chairman of the Council of Peoples' Commissars	Aleksei Kosygin	7 May 1941	15 March 1946
Deputy Chairman of the Council of Peoples' Commissars	Mikhail Pervukhin	7 May 1941	1 January 1944
Deputy Chairman of the Council of Peoples' Commissars	Lavrentiy Beria	7 May 1941	15 March 1946
Deputy Chairman of the Council of Peoples' Commissars	Maksim Saburov	7 May 1941	1 January 1943
People's Commissar for Foreign Affairs	Vyacheslav Molotov	7 May 1941	4 March 1949
People's Commissar for Agriculture	Ivan Benediktov	7 May 1941	11 December 1943
People's Commissar for Agriculture	Andrey Andreyevich Andreyev	11 December 1943	26 March 1946
People's Commissar for Armament	Boris Vannikov	7 May 1941	9 June 1941
People's Commissar for Armament	Dmitri Ustinov	9 June 1941	6 March 1953
People's Commissar for Ammunition	Pyotr Goremykin	7 May 1941	16 February 1942
People's Commissar for Ammunition	Boris Vannikov	16 February 1942	7 January 1946
People's Commissar for Tank Industry	Vyatsheslav Malyshev	1 September 1941	16 October 1945
People's Commissar for Mortar Arms	Pyotr Parshin	20 November 1941	17 February 1946
People's Commissar for Aviation Industry	Aleksey Shakhurin	7 May 1941	15 March 1946
People's Commissar for Building Materials Industry	Leonid Sosnin	7 May 1941	21 December 1944
People's Commissar for Building Materials Industry	Lazar Kaganovich	21 December 1944	12 March 1947
People's Commissar for Chemical Industry	Mikhail Denisov	7 May 1941	26 February 1942
People's Commissar for Chemical Industry	Mikhail Pervukhin	26 February 1942	17 January 1950
People's Commissar for Coal Industry	Vasily Vakhrushev	12 October 1939	19 January 1946
People's Commissar for Commerce	Aleksandr Vasilievich Lyubimov	7 May 1941	1 March 1948
People's Commissar for Transport	Lazar Kaganovich	7 May 1941	21 December 1944
People's Commissar for Transport	Ivan Kovalev	21 December 1944	15 March 1946
People's Commissar for Construction	Semyon Zakharovich Ginzburg	7 May 1941	19 January 1946
People's Commissar for Defence	Semyon Timoshenko	7 May 1941	19 July 1941
People's Commissar for Defence	Joseph Stalin	19 July 1941	3 March 1947
People's Commissar for Electrotechnical Industry	Ivan Kabanov	7 May 1941	19 March 1946
People's Commissar for Ferrous Metallurgy	Ivan Tevosian	17 April 1940	29 July 1948
People's Commissar for Finance	Arseny Zverev	19 January 1938	16 February 1948
People's Commissar for the Fishing Industry	Aleksandr Ishkov	1 July 1940	8 May 1946
People's Commissar for Food Industry	Dmitri Pavlov	7 May 1941	26 April 1951
People's Commissar for Foreign Trade	Anastas Mikoyan	30 November 1938	4 March 1949
People's Commissar for Health	Georgy Miterev	8 September 1939	17 February 1947
People's Commissar for Heavy Machine Building	Aleksandr Yefremov	17 April 1940	6 June 1941
People's Commissar for Heavy Machine Building	Nikolai Kazakov	6 June 1941	6 March 1953
People's Commissar for the Interior	Lavrentiy Beria	25 November 1938	14 January 1946
People's Commissar for the Interior	Sergei Kruglov	14 January 1946	13 March 1953
People's Commissar for Justice	Nikolay Rychkov	19 January 1939	5 February 1948
People's Commissar for Light Industry	Sergei Lukin	2 January 1939	11 June 1947
People's Commissar for Machine Building	Pyotr Parshin	7 May 1941	20 November 1941
People's Commissar for Machine Building	Pyotr Parshin	17 February 1946	15 March 1946
People's Commissar for Medium Machine Building	Stepan Akopov	1 January 1942	17 February 1946
People's Commissar for Meat and Dairy Industry	Pavel Smirnov	19 January 1939	22 August 1946
People's Commissar for Merchant Marine on Rivers	Zosima Shashkov	7 May 1941	19 March 1946
People's Commissar for Merchant Marine in Open Sea	Semjon Dukelski	7 May 1941	8 February 1942
People's Commissar for Merchant Marine in Open Sea	Pjotr Sirshov	6 June 1941	15 March 1946
People's Commissars for the Navy	Nikolay Kuznetsov	28 April 1939	25 February 1946
People's Commissars for Non-Ferrous Metallurgy	Pyotr Lomako	9 July 1940	26 June 1948

== Committees ==
Committee	Chairman	Took office	Left office
Chairman of the State Control Commission	Maksim Saburov	7 May 1941	8 December 1942
Chairman of the State Control Commission	Nikolai Voznesensky	8 December 1942	15 March 1946

Government offices
Preceded by Molotov IV	Governments of the Soviet Union; 7 May 1941–15 March 1946	Succeeded by Stalin II
