= Buzuluksky Uyezd =

Buzuluksky Uyezd (Бузулукский уезд) was one of the subdivisions of the Samara Governorate of the Russian Empire. It was situated in the northeastern part of the governorate. Its administrative centre was Buzuluk.

== Demographics ==
At the time of the Russian Empire Census of 1897, Buzuluksky Uyezd had a population of 492,952. Of these, 83.1% spoke Russian, 7.4% Mordvin, 2.5% Chuvash, 2.1% Tatar, 2.0% Bashkir, 1.9% Ukrainian, 0.6% German, 0.1% Kazakh and 0.1% Romani as their native language.
