= Rudnev =

Rudnev (Russian: Руднев) is a surname. Notable people with the surname include:

- Konstantin Rudnev (1911–1980), Soviet politician
- Lev Rudnev (1885–1956), Soviet architect
- Nikoly Rudnev (1895–1944), Ukrainian–Uzbekistani chess master
- Vadim Rudnev (1874–1940), Russian politician and editor
- Vsevolod Rudnev (1855–1913), Russian naval officer
- Yevgeniya Rudneva (1920–1944), Soviet aviator and Hero of the Soviet Union, after whom 1907 Rudneva is named

== See also ==
- Artjoms Rudņevs (born 1988), Latvian football forward
