= Kazanovka =

Kazanovka Казановка
- Village
- Location within Amur Oblast Location within Russia
- Coordinates: 49°36′N 129°40′E
- Country: Russia
- Region: Amur Oblast
- District: Arkharinsky District
- Time zone: UTC+9:00

Kazanovka (Russian: Казановка) is a rural locality (a selo) in Novospassky Selsoviet of Arkharinsky District, Amur Oblast, Russia. The population was 36 in 2018. There are 3 streets.

== Geography ==
Kazanovka is located near the left bank of the Bureya River, 75 km northwest of Arkhara (the district's administrative centre) by road. Novospassk is the nearest rural locality.
