= Georgy Miterev =

Soviet scientist and politician (1900–1977)

- Георгий Митерёв

Minister of Health
- In office 1939–1947
- Premier: Joseph Stalin
- Preceded by: Nikolai Grashchenkov

Personal details
- Born: April 23, 1900 Village Barinovka, Buzuluksky Uyezd, Samara Governorate, Russian Empire
- Died: January 10, 1977 (aged 76)
- Party: Communist Party
- Education: Samara University
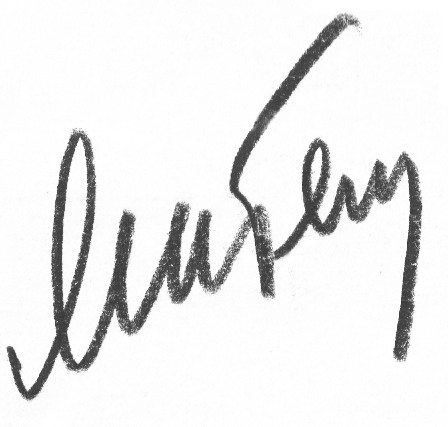
- Signature

Georgy Andreyevich Miterev (Russian: Георгий Андреевич Митерёв; 23 April 1900 – 10 January 1977) was a Soviet scientist and politician who was the long-term minister of health in the period 1939–1947.

== Early life and education ==
Miterev was born in Barinovka, Buzuluksky Uyezd, Samara Oblast, on 23 April 1900. He attended the medical faculty of Samara University and graduated in 1925. He obtained a PhD in medical sciences in 1945. His thesis was entitled the System of Public Health and Counter-Epidemic measures during the World War II Period.

== Career ==
Miterev worked as a teacher between 1919 and 1921. Following his graduation from Samara University he was an intern at the Samara Central Hospital and the Venereal Dispensary in 1925–1926. He joined the Communist Party in 1928. He worked at different medical institutions until 1939 when he was appointed people's commissar of health care. Later the institution was renamed as ministry of health care. Miterev succeeded Mikhail Boldyrev in the post. One of the major crises during the Miterev's tenure as the minister of health was the cholera outbreak which began in Leningrad in the summer of 1942. He assigned the microbiologist Zinaida Yermolyeva to organize the work of local doctors to reduce the cholera outbreak which produced desired outcomes.

Miterev was removed from his post as health minister on 17 February 1947. The reason for his dismissal was his role in the meeting of the US Ambassador Walter Bedell Smith with two scientists, Nina Klyuyeva and her husband Grigory Roskin, in Moscow in June 1946 about their promising treatment to eliminate the tumor growth in cancer patients. Then Miterev was interrogated about his function in the meeting and severely reprimanded by the honor court "for anti-state and anti-patriotic actions."

However, he was rehabilitated soon and served as the head of the central public health and hygiene scientific research institute between 1947 and 1954. While working there he got the title of professor in 1950. Next he was named the president of the executive committee of the Soviet Union Red Cross and Red Crescent Society in 1954. From 1958 he worked at the First Moscow Medical Institute as a faculty member.

== Later years and death ==
In June 1971 Miterev retired after serving as director of the state research sanitary institute. He died on 10 January 1977.

=== Awards ===
Miterev received three Orders of Lenin, four Orders of the Red Banner of Labour, and an Order of the October Revolution. He was also the recipient of the Red Cross awards from various countries, including Poland, Denmark, Greece, Belgium and the United Kingdom.
