= 1946 Soviet Union legislative election =

- 10 February 1946
- Soviet of the Union
- All 682 seats in the Soviet of the Union
Party	Seats	+/–
All-Union Communist Party (Bolsheviks)	576	+115
Independents	106	−2
This lists parties that won seats. See the complete results below.
- Soviet of Nationalities
- All 657 seats in the Soviet of Nationalities
Party	Seats	+/–
All-Union Communist Party (Bolsheviks)	509	+100
Independents	148	−17
This lists parties that won seats. See the complete results below.
Chairman of the Council of Ministers before	Chairman of the Council of Ministers after
Joseph Stalin; VKP(b)	Joseph Stalin; VKP(b)

Supreme Soviet elections were held in the Soviet Union on 10 February 1946. Originally scheduled for December 1941, the elections were delayed due to the outbreak of war with Germany in June of that year. According to Soviet law, 325,000 out of an eligible adult population of 101,718,000 were disenfranchised for various reasons. This election was the first in which a 1945 decree allowed members of the Red Army stationed outside the Soviet Union to vote for both chambers of the Supreme Soviet in special 100,000-member districts, a practice which would continue for decades with the Red Army presence in the Eastern bloc.

== Results ==
=== Soviet of the Union ===
Party or alliance		Votes	%	Seats	+/–
Bloc of Communists and Non-Partisans	All-Union Communist Party (Bolsheviks)	100,621,225	99.19	576	+115
Bloc of Communists and Non-Partisans	Independents	100,621,225	99.19	106	–2
Against		819,699	0.81	–	–
Total		101,440,924	100.00	682	+113
Valid votes		101,440,924	99.99		
Invalid/blank votes		10,012	0.01		
Total votes		101,450,936	100.00		
Registered voters/turnout		101,717,686	99.74		
Source: Nohlen & Stöver

==== By republic ====
Soviet Republic	Votes					Seats
Soviet Republic	For	%	Against	%	Invalid	Seats
Russian SFSR	56,331,954	99.22				
Armenian SSR	641,254	99.71				
Azerbaijan SSR	1,415,493	99.72				
Byelorussian SSR	4,011,161	99.37				
Estonian SSR	719,803	94.59				
Georgian SSR	1,937,780	99.90				
Karelo-Finnish SSR	208,654	99.43				
Kazakh SSR	3,284,296	99.56				
Kirghiz SSR	773,891	99.54				
Latvian SSR	1,223,310	98.93				
Lithuanian SSR	1,207,200	95.38				
Moldavian SSR	1,286,652	99.62				
Tajik SSR	723,889	99.80				
Turkmen SSR	620,207	99.74				
Ukrainian SSR	20,392,737	99.08				
Uzbek SSR	3,096,932	99.79				
Soviet Union	100,621,225	99.18	819,699	0.81	10,012	682
Source: Cīņa, Nr. 38 (14,02.1946)

=== Soviet of Nationalities ===
Party or alliance		Votes	%	Seats	+/–
Bloc of Communists and Non-Partisans	All-Union Communist Party (Bolsheviks)	100,603,567	99.19	509	+100
Bloc of Communists and Non-Partisans	Independents	100,603,567	99.19	148	–17
Against		818,955	0.81	–	–
Total		101,422,522	100.00	657	+83
Valid votes		101,422,522	99.97		
Invalid/blank votes		28,414	0.03		
Total votes		101,450,936	100.00		
Registered voters/turnout		101,717,686	99.74		
Source: Nohlen & Stöver
