= Khrushchev's Second Government =

Soviet Government (1962–1964)

Khrushchev II
- 18th Government of the Soviet Union

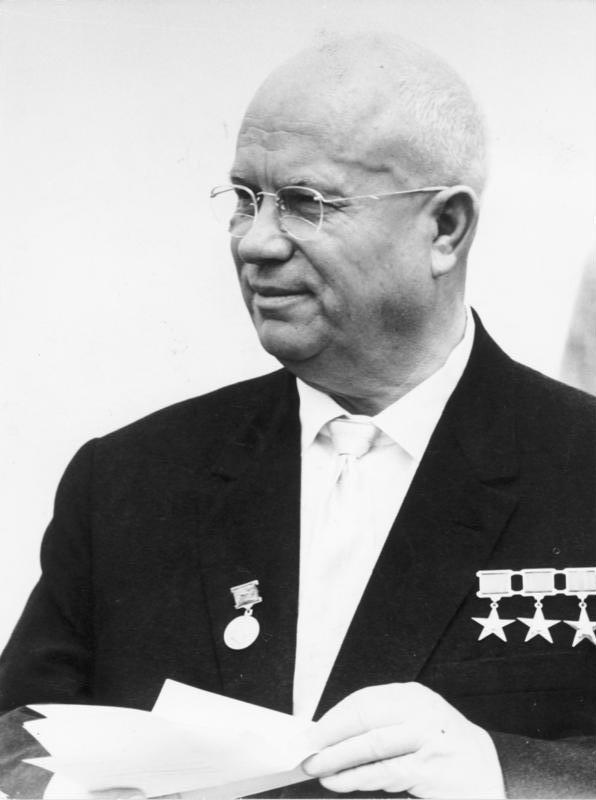
- Date formed: 25 April 1962
- Date dissolved: 15 October 1964

People and organisations
- Head of state: Kliment Voroshilov 1958-1960; Leonid Brezhnev 1960-1964; Anastas Mikoyan 1964
- Head of government: Nikita Khrushchev
- Member party: CPSU
- Status in legislature: One-party state

History
- Election: 1962 legislative election
- Predecessor: Khrushchev I
- Successor: Kosygin I

The former government of Nikita Khrushchev was dissolved following the Soviet election of 1962.

== Ministries ==
Ministry	Minister	Period
Chairman of the Council of Ministers	Nikita Khrushchev	25 April 1962 – 15 October 1964
First Deputy Chairman of the Council of Ministers	Anastas Mikoyan	25 April 1962 – 15 July 1964
First Deputy Chairman of the Council of Ministers	Alexei Kosygin	25 April 1962 – 15 October 1964
First Deputy Chairman of the Council of Ministers	Dmitriy Ustinov	13 March 1963 – 15 October 1964
Deputy Chairman of the Council of Ministers	Konstantin Rudnev	25 April 1962 – 15 October 1964
Deputy Chairman of the Council of Ministers	Nikolai Ignatyev	25 April 1962 – 15 October 1964
Deputy Chairman of the Council of Ministers	Alexander Zasyadko	25 April 1962 – 9 November 1962
Deputy Chairman of the Council of Ministers	Pyotr Lomako	10 November 1962 – 15 October 1964
Deputy Chairman of the Council of Ministers	Vladimir Novikov	25 April 1962 – 24 November 1962
Deputy Chairman of the Council of Ministers	Dmitry Ustinov	25 April 1962 – 13 March 1963
Deputy Chairman of the Council of Ministers	Leonid Smirnov	13 March 1963 – 13 March 1964
Deputy Chairman of the Council of Ministers	Veniamin Dymshits	17 July 1962 – 13 March 1964
Deputy Chairman of the Council of Ministers	Dmitry Polyansky	25 April 1962 – 15 October 1964
Deputy Chairman of the Council of Ministers	Alexander Shelepin	25 April 1962 – 15 October 1964
Deputy Chairman of the Council of Ministers	Ignaty Novikov	25 April 1962 – 15 October 1964
Deputy Chairman of the Council of Ministers	Mikhail Lesechko	25 April 1962 – 15 October 1964
Minister of Foreign Trade	Nikolai Patolichev	25 April 1962 – 15 October 1964
Minister of Railways	Boris Beshchev	25 April 1962 – 15 October 1964
Minister of Merchant Marine	Viktor Bakayev	25 April 1962 – 15 October 1964
Minister of Medium Machine Building	Yefim Slavsky	25 April 1962 – 13 March 1963
Minister of Foreign Affairs	Andrei Gromyko	25 April 1962 – 15 October 1964
Minister of Culture	Yekaterina Furtseva	25 April 1962 – 15 October 1964
Minister of Higher Education	Vyacheslav Yelyutin	25 April 1962 – 15 October 1964
Minister of Finance	Vasily Garbuzov	25 April 1962 – 15 October 1964
Minister of Defence	Rodion Malinovsky	25 April 1962 – 15 October 1964
Minister of Communications	Nikolai Psurtsev	25 April 1962 – 15 October 1964
Minister of Health	Sergei Kurashov	25 April 1962 – 15 October 1964
Minister of Agriculture	Konstantin Pysin	25 April 1962 – 8 March 1963
Minister of Agriculture	Ivan Volovchenko	8 March 1963 – 15 October 1964
Minister of Geology	Aleksandr Sidorenko	25 April 1962 – 13 March 1963
Minister of Energy and Electrification	Ignaty Novikov	25 April 1962 – 24 November 1962
Minister of Energy and Electrification	Pyotr Neporozhny	26 November 1962 – 15 October 1964
Minister of Civil Aviation	Yevgeny Loginov	28 July – 15 October 1964

== Committees ==
Committee	Chairman	Period
Chairman of the State Control Commission	Georgi Yenyutin	25 April–24 November 1962
Chairman of the People's Control Commission	Alexander Shelepin	24 November 1962 – 15 October 1964
Chairman of the State Planning Committee	Vladimir Novikov	25 April 1962 – 17 July 1962
Chairman of the State Planning Committee	Veniamin Dymshits	18 July 1962 – 24 November 1962
Chairman of the State Planning Committee	Pyotr Lomako	24 November 1962 – 15 October 1964
Chairman of the State Committee for Transport Construction	Yevgeny Kozhevnikov	25 April 1962 – 15 October 1964
Chairman of the State Committee for State Security (KGB)	Vladimir Semichastny	25 April 1962 – 15 October 1964

Government offices
Preceded by Khrushchev I	Governments of the Soviet Union; 25 April 1962–15 October 1964	Succeeded by Kosygin I
