= Efim Slavsky =

Soviet politician and engineer (1898–1991)

- Ефим Славский

Minister of Medium Machine-Building
- In office 24 July 1957 – 22 November 1986
- Premier: Nikolai Ryzhkov; Nikolai Tikhonov; Alexei Kosygin; Nikita Khrushchev; Nikolai Bulganin
- Preceded by: Mikhail Pervukhin
- Succeeded by: Lev Ryabev

People's Commissar for Non-Ferrous Metallurgy
- In office 1945–1946

Personal details
- Born: 7 November 1898 Dmytriivsk, Don Host Oblast, Russian Empire
- Died: 28 November 1991 (aged 93) Moscow, Soviet Union
- Resting place: Novodevichy Cemetery
- Citizenship: Soviet Union
- Party: Communist Party of the Soviet Union
- Education: Moscow Institute of Nonferrous Metals
- Occupation: Politician, engineer
- Cabinet: Bulganin, Khrushchev, Kosygin, Tikhonov, Ryzhkov
- Awards: Lenin Prize (1980); Stalin Prize (1949, 1951, 1984); Star of Peoples' Friendship (1978); Hero of Socialist Labor (1949, 1951, 1962)

Efim Pavlovich Slavsky (Russian: Ефим Павлович Славский, Ukrainian: Юхим Павлович Славський; romanized: Yefim Pavlovich Slavskiy, Yukhym Pavlovych Slavskyi; 7 November 1898 – 28 November 1991) was a Soviet-Ukrainian politician and engineer best known for his role in liquidating the Kyshtym and Chernobyl nuclear accidents in the Soviet Union.

Before his political appointment, Slavsky worked as an engineer in the Soviet nuclear weapons program, where he became one of the senior program managers. Slavsky was later tasked with leading the Ministry of Medium Machine-Building, overseeing the Soviet nuclear program from 1956 until his forced retirement in 1986.

== Early life ==
Slavsky was born in Dmytriivsk to a peasant family in the Russian Empire. His father, Faivel Slavsky, perished, after which Efim became a shepherd at age 8. When he was 15, Slavsky went to work in the Donbas region coal mines. In 1918, Slavsky joined the Red Guard before fighting with the Petliurists. After its dissolution in 1923, Slavsky took a political course and became a regiment commissar as part of a cavalry brigade. In 1928, Slavsky quit the armed forces to attend the Moscow Institute of Nonferrous Metals, where he graduated in 1933. After graduation, Slavsky moved to Ordzhonikidze to work at the Electrozink manufacturing plant, producing zinc, lead, and copper. He worked first as an engineer and then as plant director.

== War years ==
When the Second World War broke out, Slavsky transferred to the Urals Aluminium Plant, the largest aluminium plant in the Soviet Union. Throughout the war, Slavsky received 3 Orders of Lenin for his service. In 1941, Slavsky got into trouble with the State Defence Committee for violating orders regarding distributing rations to children. In 1943, Slavsky worked at the newly founded Kurchatov Institute of Atomic Energy, where he helped procure the large quantities of highly pure graphite needed to construct the Soviet Union's first nuclear reactor. In 1945, he left the Kurchatov Institute to work as the interim deputy minister of Non-Ferrous Metallurgy.

== The Atomic Bomb ==
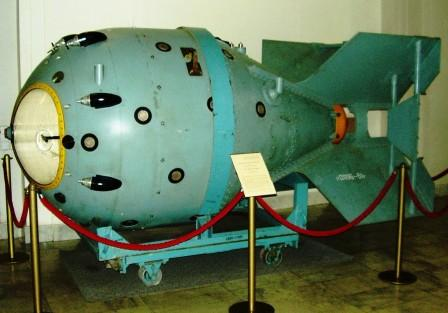
The first Soviet nuclear test in 1949

After the war, Slavsky joined forces with Igor Kurchatov and other Soviet scientists to begin the Soviet version of The Manhattan Project. Soviet spies helped greatly in the creation of the bomb, as they stole plans and schematics from the Americans. For his work on the RDS-1 prototype used in the original Joe-1 test, Slavsky received his first Hero of Socialist Labour in 1949. Five years later, in 1954, he received his second for the production of the first thermonuclear weapon in the Soviet Union.

== Kyshtym ==
=== Mayak & Annushka ===
In 1945, Slavsky and other Soviet engineers began construction on the top secret Mayak Complex near the settlement of Kyshtym. Here, the Soviet A-1 reactor, nicknamed "Annushka," would produce the plutonium necessary for the Soviet atomic bomb. The reactor went online in 1948 but suffered severe teething problems. Loss-of-Coolant Accidents were commonplace as the aluminum cooling pipes were prone to leaks, causing fuel to overheat and melt fuel channels shut. In these cases, workers would drill through the damaged channel and remove the radioactive contents. In November 1948, A-1 had finally produced enough plutonium for use in an atomic bomb. Immediately after the removal of plutonium began, a fresh accident occurred – the loading equipment for the reactor broke, leading to workers needing to enter the reactor and remove the fuel with their bare hands. Despite the protests of his medical staff, Slavsky entered the reactor hall on multiple occasions to assist his workers and received considerably more than the already extremely high 30 REM/annum exposure limit.

=== The Accident ===
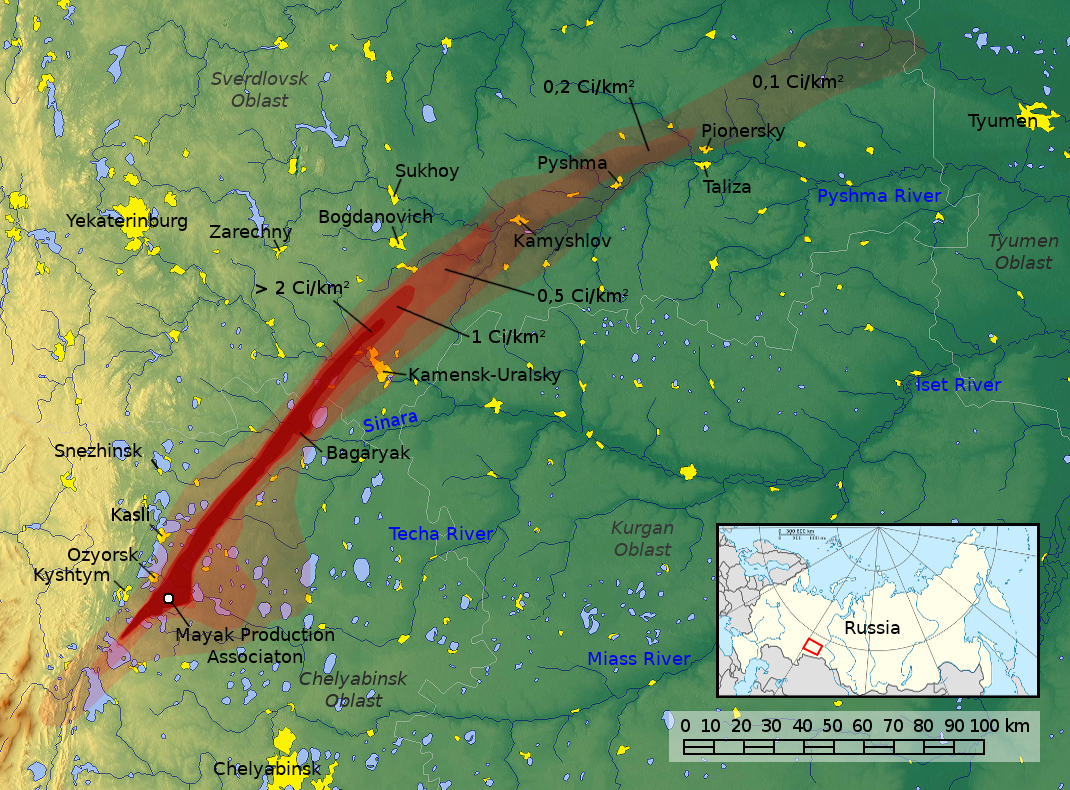
A trace map of radiation distribution following the 1957 accident

In 1957, an explosion occurred at the Mayak nuclear waste storage facility. Slavsky was placed in charge of the cleanup and liquidation operation. He ordered a quarantine of the surrounding region and evacuated the communities downwind of the distraught plant. To slow the spread of radiation and radionuclides, Slavsky and his fellow workers created a burial enclosure technique; this was later also employed after the 1986 Chernobyl disaster.

RBMK (High-Power Channel Type) Reactor Schematic

== The Ministry of Medium Machine Building ==
In July 1957, Slavsky was appointed the 5th Minister of Medium Machine-Building. The ministry was established per the Soviet First Directorate (nuclear industry) and Third Directorate (long-range weapons). He was instrumental in creating the Tsar Bomba (the world's most powerful thermonuclear weapon). Slavsky is known for turning the ministry into a very private organization accepting very little oversight from the All-Union government, actions that would later lead to the breakup of his nuclear empire. During his time at the ministry, Slavsky assisted in the design of the Soviet RBMK nuclear reactor.

== Chernobyl ==
On May 20, 1986, Slavsky was put in charge of Construction Committee 605, responsible for liquidating the consequences of the April 26th accident at Chernobyl. He travelled to Pripyat to assess the damage and conceived the plans for the Chernobyl sarcophagus.

== Slavsky's retirement ==
In 1986, following the disaster at Chernobyl, Slavsky retired from the Ministry of Medium Machine Building. The ministry was later folded into the Soviet Ministry of Atomic Energy to create the Ministry of Atomic Energy and Industry of the USSR. Slavsky was 88 at his retirement, making him the oldest member of the Soviet cabinet. Many have speculated that Slavsky's retirement was not his choice and that he had been ousted from the Soviet cabinet.

On November 28, 1991, Efim P. Slavsky died at 93 shortly before the dissolution of the Soviet Union.
