= Boris Petrovsky =

Soviet and Russian surgeon and politician (1908–2004)

- Борис Петровский
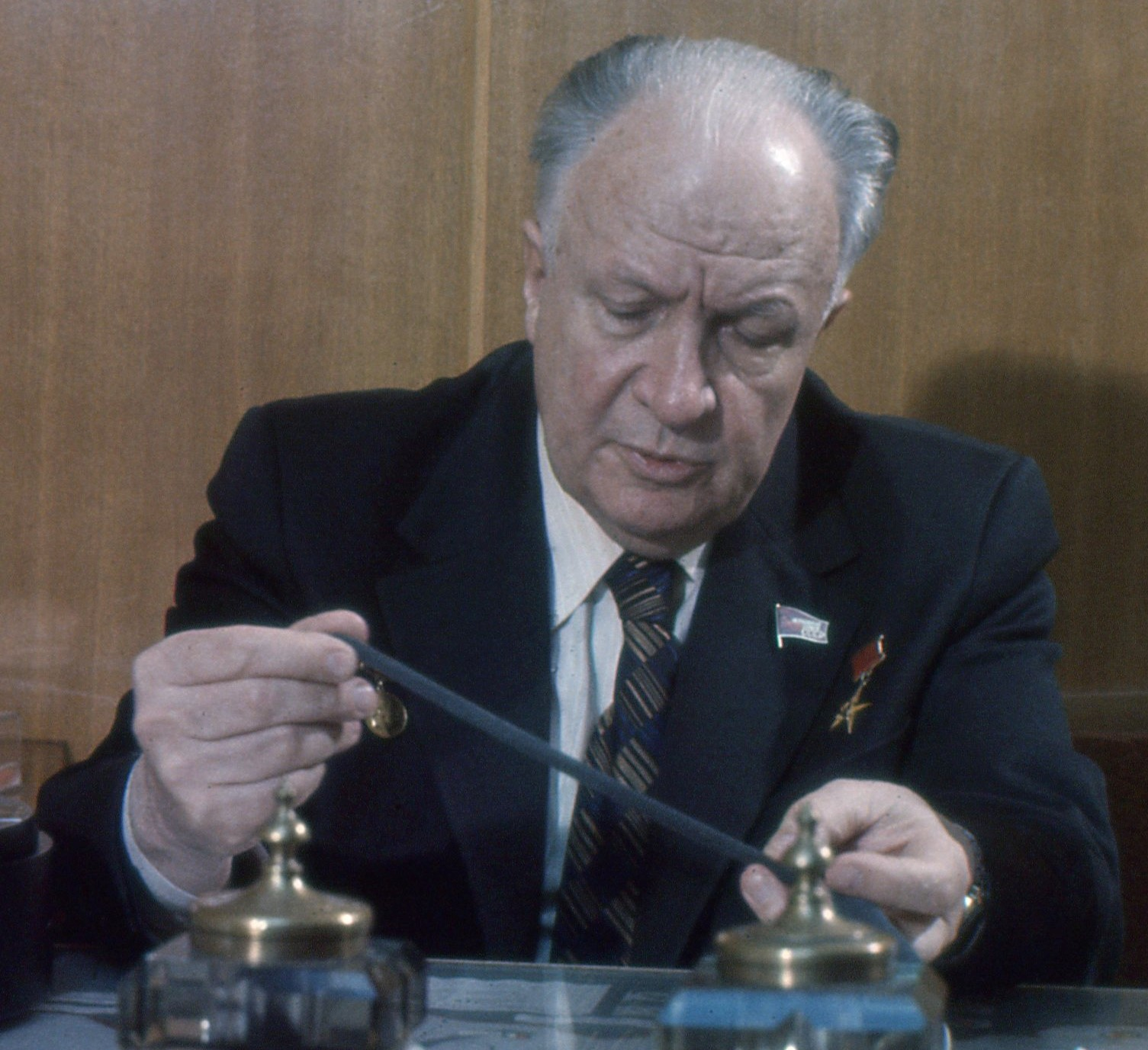
- Petrovsky in 1984

Minister of Health
- In office September 8, 1965 – December 12, 1980
- President: Leonid Brezhnev
- Premier: Alexei Kosygin
- Preceded by: Sergei Kurashov
- Succeeded by: Sergei Burenkov

Personal details
- Born: Boris Vasilyevich Petrovsky; 27 June 1908 Yessentuki, Russian Empire
- Died: 4 May 2004 (aged 95) Moscow, Russia
- Resting place: Novodevichy Cemetery, Moscow
- Party: Communist Party
- Spouse: Yekaterina Timofeyeva
- Parents: Vasily Petrovsky (father); Lydia Petrovskaya (mother)
- Education: Moscow State University

Boris Vasilyevich Petrovsky (Russian: Борис Васильевич Петровский; 27 June 1908 – 4 May 2004) was a Soviet and Russian general surgeon who was the health minister of the Soviet Union in the period 1965–1980.

== Early life and education ==
Petrovsky was born in Yessentuki on 27 June 1908. His parents were Vasily and Lydia Petrovsky. His father was a physician.

Petrovsky applied for the Medicine Faculty of Moscow University, but he was not accepted due to the restricted quota and was transferred to the Engineering Faculty of the same university. However, through the help of Nadezhda Krupskaya, Vladimir Lenin's widow, who was serving as the deputy education minister, Petrovsky managed to enroll to the Medicine Faculty and received a degree in medicine. In 1933 he became a research investigator at the Moscow Institute for Oncology where he received a PhD completing his thesis on the transfusion of blood and blood substitutes in oncology. His second thesis which was required to pursue an academic career was about his experience as a military surgeon during the wars with Finland and Germany.

== Career ==
Petrovsky served in the Red Army as a military surgeon during the wars with Finland in 1939-40 and during World War II with Germany. In 1945 he was appointed deputy director of the Research Institute for Experimental and Clinical Surgery where he extensively studied oesophageal surgery. In 1948 Petrovsky was promoted to the title of professor of general surgery at the Moscow State Medical Institute. In the period between 1949 and 1951 he worked at Budapest University as the chairman of hospital surgery and director of a surgery clinic. Then he was named chief surgeon at the Kremlin Hospital in Moscow. Next he was appointed chairman of surgery at the Moscow Medical Institute and in 1956 he was named the chairman of surgery at the Moscow State Medical Institute.

In 1965 Petrovsky carried out the first kidney transplant in the Soviet Union. In September of the same year he was appointed minister of health. When he was in office, he continued such operations and implemented more than thirty kidney transplants until 1968. During his term the Oath of a Soviet Physician began to be used in 1971 when it was accepted by the Supreme Soviet of which he was a member. On 23 May 1972 Petrovsky and US Secretary of State William P. Rogers signed a five-year agreement for a cooperative health program.

Petrovsky was also a member of the USSR Academy of Medical Sciences.

== Later years, personal life and death ==
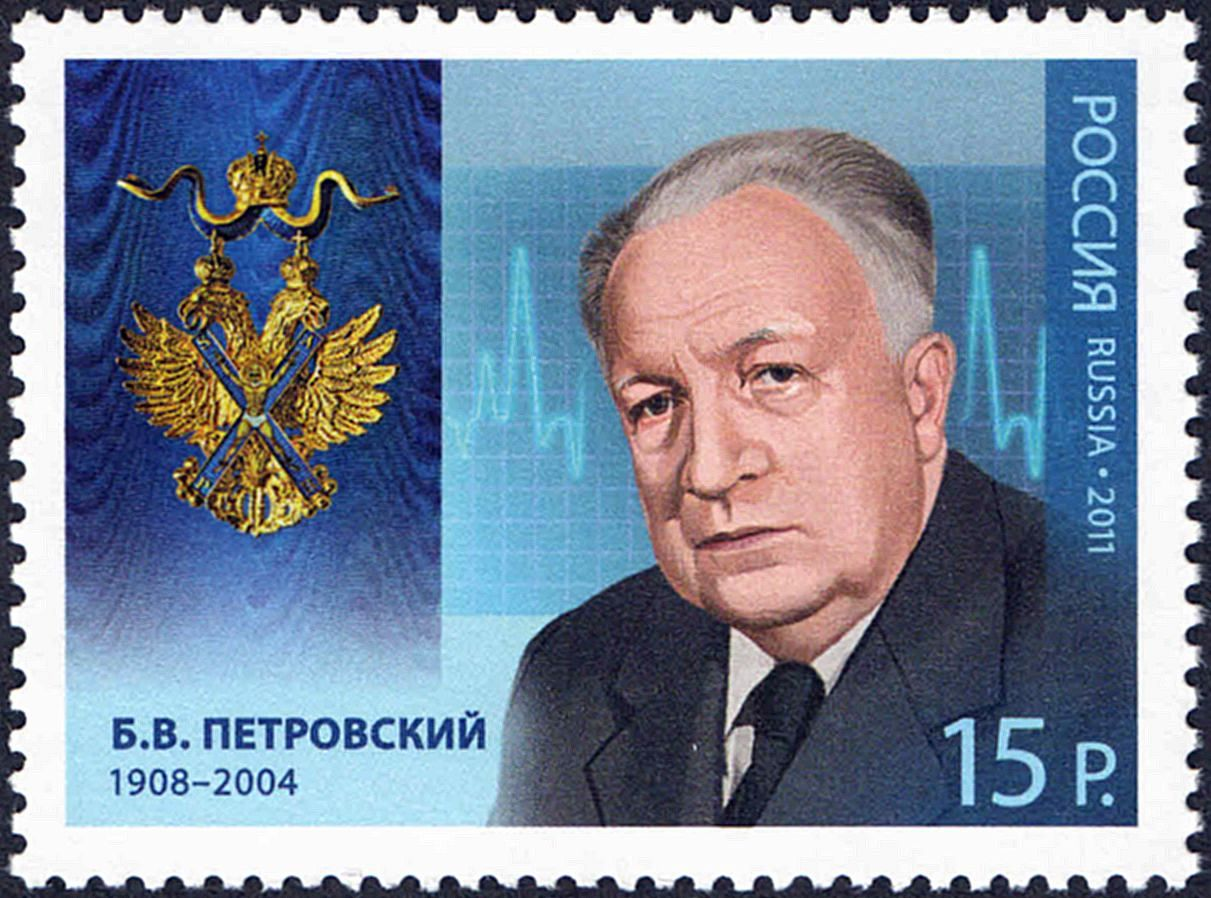
Stamp of Russia dated 2011 issued for the memory of Boris Petrovsky

Petrovsky married Yekaterina Timofeyeva, a biologist-researcher at a university. They had a daughter, Marina, who was a physician.

Petrovsky died in Moscow on 4 May 2004 and was buried at the Novodevichy Cemetery.

=== Awards ===
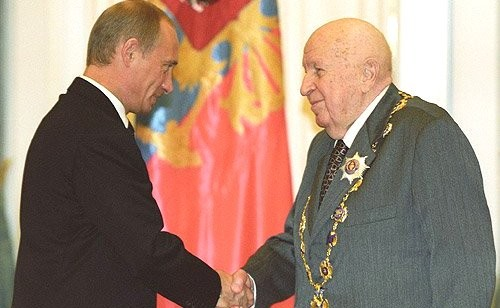
With President Vladimir Putin on presentation of the Order of St. Andrew, 10 October 2003

Petrovsky was awarded the Order of Lenin and the Lenin Prize in 1960 and the Hero of Socialist Labour in 1968. He was elected as the Honorary Fellowship by the Royal College of Surgeons of England and was the sixth Russian scientist who was given this title after Viktor Pashutin, Nikolai Velyaminov, Vladimir Oppel, Nikolay Burdenko and Sergei Yudin. He was also a recipient of honorary fellowship of the Royal College of Surgeons in Ireland, of the Royal College of Surgeons of Edinburgh, of the surgical societies of Poland, Hungary, Italy and Cuba, of the Czechoslovak Medical Society and of the French Surgical Academy.

His other awards include:

- Order of the Red Star (1942)
- Order of the Red Banner of Labour (1970)
- Order of the October Revolution (1971)
- USSR State Prize (1971)
- Order of Friendship of Peoples (1993)

=== Work ===
One of the books written by Petrovsky was published in 1949 entitled Surgical Treatment of Vascular Injuries. In 1995 he published his memoirs, Man. Medicine. Life.
