= 1970 Soviet Union legislative election =

- 14 June 1970
- Soviet of the Union
- All 767 seats in the Soviet of the Union
Party	Seats	+/–
Communist Party	562	−11
Independents	205	+11
This lists parties that won seats. See the complete results below.
- Soviet of Nationalities
- All 750 seats in the Soviet of Nationalities
Party	Seats	+/–
Communist Party	534	−34
Independents	216	+34
This lists parties that won seats. See the complete results below.
Chairman of the Council of Ministers before	Chairman of the Council of Ministers after
Alexei Kosygin; CPSU	Alexei Kosygin; CPSU

Supreme Soviet elections were held in the Soviet Union on 14 June 1970.

== Electoral system ==
Candidates had to be nominated by the Communist Party of the Soviet Union (CPSU) or by a public organisation. However, all public organisations were controlled by the party and were subservient to a 1931 law that required them to accept party rule. The CPSU itself remained the only legal one in the country.

Voters could vote against the CPSU candidate, but could only do so by using polling booths, whereas votes for the party could be cast simply by submitting a blank ballot. Turnout was required to be over 50% for the election to be valid.

== Candidates ==
CPSU candidates accounted for around three quarters of the nominees, whilst many of the others were members of Komsomol.

== Results ==
=== Soviet of the Union ===
Party or alliance		Votes	%	Seats	+/–
BKB	Communist Party of the Soviet Union	152,771,739	99.74	562	–11
BKB	Independents	152,771,739	99.74	205	+11
Against		400,054	0.26	–	–
Total		153,171,793	100.00	767	0
Valid votes		153,171,793	100.00		
Invalid/blank votes		420	0.00		
Total votes		153,172,213	100.00		
Registered voters/turnout		153,237,112	99.96		
Source: Nohlen & Stöver

==== By republic ====
Soviet Republic	Votes					Seats
Soviet Republic	For	%	Against	%	Invalid	Seats
Russian SFSR	84,511,249	99.62	318,725	0.38	222	423
Armenian SSR	1,251,812	99.91	1,140	0.09	0	7
Azerbaijan SSR	2,472,025	99.95	1,260	0.05	7	15
Byelorussian SSR	5,838,677	99.92	4,423	0.08	2	28
Estonian SSR	945,879	99.67	3,019	0.33	56	4
Georgian SSR	2,833,298	99.98	549	0.02	6	15
Kazakh SSR	7,038,724	99.72	19,755	0.28	1	39
Kirghiz SSR	1,475,729	99.77	3,364	0.23	0	9
Latvian SSR	1,701,358	99.92	1,354	0.08	10	7
Lithuanian SSR	2,055,767	99.96	873	0.04	2	10
Moldavian SSR	2,163,805	99.93	1,583	0.07	0	11
Tajik SSR	1,336,401	99.86	1,939	0.14	1	8
Turkmen SSR	1,033,718	99.80	2,081	0.20	0	6
Ukrainian SSR	32,496,538	99.92	27,431	0.08	0	150
Uzbek SSR	5,616,759	99.84	8,847	0.16	114	35
Soviet Union	152,771,739	99.74	396,343	0.24	420	767
Source: IPU

=== Soviet of Nationalities ===
Party or alliance		Votes	%	Seats	+/–
BKB	Communist Party of the Soviet Union	152,843,228	99.79	534	–34
BKB	Independents	152,843,228	99.79	216	+34
Against		328,544	0.21	–	–
Total		153,171,772	100.00	750	0
Valid votes		153,171,772	100.00		
Invalid/blank votes		441	0.00		
Total votes		153,172,213	100.00		
Registered voters/turnout		153,237,112	99.96		
Source: Nohlen & Stöver

==== By republic ====
	Votes					Seats
	For	%	Against	%	Invalid	Seats
Union Republics	152,843,228	99.79	320,633	0.21	441	480
Autonomous Republics	11,449,897	99.59	47,169	0.41	24	220
Autonomous Regions	1,115,099	99.64	3,978	0.36	1	40
National Areas	583,055	99.55	2,645	0.45	0	10
Source: IPU
