= 1962 Soviet Union legislative election =

- 18 March 1962
- Soviet of the Union
- All 791 seats in the Soviet of the Union
Party	Seats	+/–
Communist Party	604	+41
Independents	187	+12
This lists parties that won seats. See the complete results below.
- Soviet of Nationalities
- All 652 seats in the Soviet of Nationalities
Party	Seats	+/–
Communist Party	490	+5
Independents	162	+7
This lists parties that won seats. See the complete results below.
Chairman of the Council of Ministers before	Chairman of the Council of Ministers after
Nikita Khrushchev; CPSU	Nikita Khrushchev; CPSU

Supreme Soviet elections were held in the Soviet Union on 18 March 1962.

== Electoral system ==
Candidates had to be nominated by the Communist Party of the Soviet Union (CPSU) or by a public organisation. However, all public organisations were controlled by the party and were subservient to a 1931 law that required them to accept party rule. The CPSU itself remained the only legal one in the country.

Voters could vote against the CPSU candidate, but could only do so by using polling booths, whereas votes for the party could be cast simply by submitting a blank ballot. Turnout was required to be over 50% for the election to be valid.

== Candidates ==
CPSU candidates accounted for around three quarters of the nominees, whilst many of the others were members of Komsomol.

== Results ==
=== Soviet of the Union ===
Party or alliance		Votes	%	Seats	+/–
BKB	Communist Party of the Soviet Union	139,210,431	99.47	604	+41
BKB	Independents	139,210,431	99.47	187	+12
Against		746,563	0.53	–	–
Total		139,956,994	100.00	791	+53
Valid votes		139,956,994	100.00		
Invalid/blank votes		815	0.00		
Total votes		139,957,809	100.00		
Registered voters/turnout		140,022,359	99.95		
Source: Nohlen & Stöver

=== Soviet of Nationalities ===
Party or alliance		Votes	%	Seats	+/–
BKB	Communist Party of the Soviet Union	139,391,455	99.60	490	+5
BKB	Independents	139,391,455	99.60	162	+7
Against		565,648	0.40	–	–
Total		139,957,103	100.00	652	+12
Valid votes		139,957,103	100.00		
Invalid/blank votes		706	0.00		
Total votes		139,957,809	100.00		
Registered voters/turnout		140,022,359	99.95		
Source: Nohlen & Stöver
