= Sergei Kurashov =

Soviet politician (1910–1965)

- Сергей Курашов

Minister of Health of the Soviet Union
- In office 12 January 1959 – 27 August 1965
- Premier: Nikita Khrushchev; Alexei Kosygin
- Preceded by: Maria Kovrigina
- Succeeded by: Boris Petrovsky

Personal details
- Born: Sergei Vladimirovich Kurashov; 1 October 1910 Tambov, Russian Empire
- Died: 27 August 1965 (aged 54) Moscow, Russian SFSR, Soviet Union
- Resting place: Kremlin Wall Necropolis, Moscow

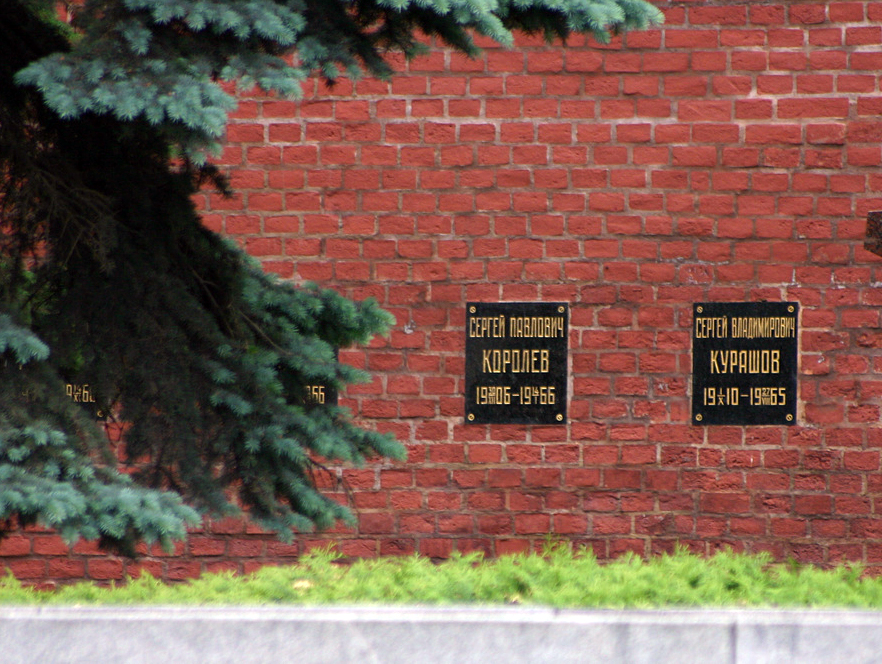
Kurashov's tomb in the Kremlin Wall Necropolis.

Sergei Kurashov (Russian: Серге́й Влади́мирович Курашов; 1 October [O.S. 18 September] 1910 – 27 August 1965) was the minister of public health of the USSR from 1959 until his death in 1965. The medical institute in Kazan is named for him. He served as the president of the World Health Organization's World Health Assembly in 1962.

His ashes were buried at the Kremlin Wall Necropolis.
