= Communist Party of the Soviet Union =

Ruling party of the Soviet Union (1912–1991)

Communist Party of the Soviet Union Коммунистическая партия Советского Союза
- Pin of the CPSU featuring a bust of Lenin
- Abbreviation: CPSU (from October 1952)
- Governing body: Congress of the CPSU (Note: Formally, the supreme body of the Communist Party of the Soviet Union was the Party Congress, but it met infrequently (annually in the early years, then irregularly, with a 13-year gap between 1939 and 1952) and in practice ratified decisions made by the leadership. Between congresses, the Central Committee was the nominal governing body, and it elected the party’s top organs. From 1919 to 1952 these were the Politburo, the Secretariat, and the Orgburo (Organizational Bureau). The Politburo was the center of real power, deciding major questions of party and state policy. The Secretariat, which oversaw party administration and appointments through the nomenklatura system, grew in importance after Joseph Stalin became General Secretary in 1922. Control over personnel let him build a base of support that helped him consolidate power. The Orgburo, which dealt with organizational matters, was always the least powerful of the three, and it was abolished at the 19th Congress in 1952, with its functions transferred to the Secretariat. That congress also renamed the Politburo the "Presidium." The party’s top official was the General Secretary (the title was changed to First Secretary from 1953 to 1966, when it was restored). That official was generally the most powerful figure in the Soviet system, though not always by a single formal office. The formal head of state (the Chairman of the Presidium of the Supreme Soviet) and the head of government (the Chairman of the Council of Ministers) were separate posts, which some party leaders, such as Khrushchev and Brezhnev, held at various points alongside party leadership. The leader’s actual authority also varied with the era and with the leader’s personal standing within the Politburo.)
- Founder: Vladimir Lenin (Note: The Prague Conference of January 1912, at which Lenin represented the Editorial Board of the Central Organ and was the leading figure, elected a Central Committee and set up the Bureau of the C.C. in Russia. Delegates included Grigory Ordzhonikidze (Tiflis organisation), Suren Spandaryan (Baku), and Filipp Goloshchekin (Moscow). The Central Committee included Vladimir Ilyich Lenin (born Ulyanov), Joseph Stalin (Iosif Vissarionovich Dzhugashvili), Ordzhonikidze, Yakov Mikhailovich Sverdlov, Spandaryan, and Goloshchekin, along with unnamed "others." Stalin and Sverdlov were elected in absentia because they were in exile, and Mikhail Ivanovich Kalinin was named an alternate member. Stalin headed the Russian Bureau of the Central Committee, which directed work inside Russia and also included Sverdlov, Spandaryan, Ordzhonikidze, Kalinin, and Goloshchekin.)
- Founded: January 1912; 114 years ago (Note: August 1903 (Bolshevik faction of the RSDLP); January 1912 (split with RSDLP); May 1917 (separate VII congress held); 8 March 1918 (official name change))
- Banned: 6 November 1991; 35 years ago
- Preceded by: Russian Social Democratic Labour Party (Note: The party split into the Bolshevik and Menshevik factions in 1903, with the two factions forming separate parties in 1912. However, joint party organisations continued to exist until 1917.)
- Succeeded by: UCP–CPSU
- Headquarters: 4 Staraya Square, Moscow
- Newspaper: Pravda
- Think tank: Marx–Engels–Lenin Institute
- Youth wing: Komsomol (VLKSM) (Note: The Komsomol was the final stage of three youth organizations with members up to age 28, graduated at 14 from the Young Pioneers, and at nine from the Little Octobrists.)
- Party academy: Higher Party School
- Trade union: All-Union Central Council of Trade Unions
- Membership: approx. 19.4 million (1989 est.)
- Ideology: Communism (Russian); Marxism–Leninism (Note: The party's ideological development proceeded from Bolshevism and Leninism (1903–24) to Stalinism as the dominant form of Marxism–Leninism (1924–56), followed by a period in which Marxism–Leninism was accompanied by currents such as Soviet patriotism (1956–85), and in its final years included some elements of democratic socialism and market socialism (1985–91), though Marxism–Leninism remained the party's official doctrine throughout.)
- Political position: Far-left
- Religion: None (State atheism)
- National affiliation: Bloc of Communists and Non-Party Members (1936–91)
- International affiliation: Second International (1912–14); Berne International (1915–19); Comintern (1919–43); Cominform (1947–56)
- Colours: Red (official)
- Slogan: "Workers of the world, unite!"
- Anthem: "The Internationale" (Note: Russian: Интернациона́л, romanized: Internatsionál)

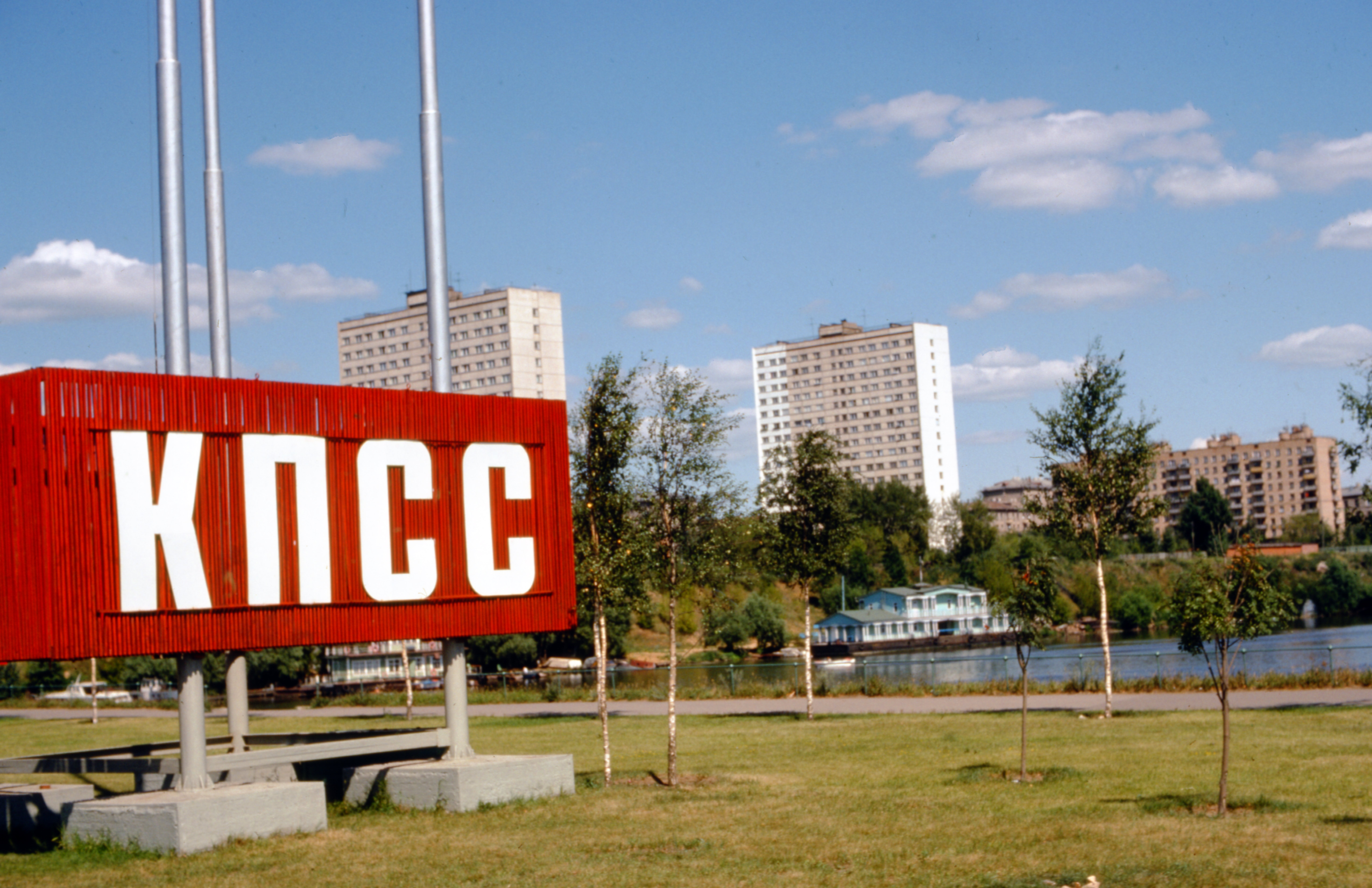
A neighborhood in the Kozhukhovsky Bay of the Moskva River with a large sign promoting the Communist Party of the Soviet Union, Moscow, 1975

The Communist Party of the Soviet Union (CPSU), (Note: Russian: Коммунистическая партия Советского Союза, romanized: Kommunisticheskaya partiya Sovetskogo Soyuza IPA: [kəmʊnʲɪsʲˈtʲitɕɪskəjə ˈpartʲɪjə sɐˈvʲetskəvə sɐˈjuzə]) abbreviated in Russian as КПСС (KPSS), also known at some points as the Russian Social Democratic Labour Party (Bolsheviks), (Note: Party name in 1912–1918) the Russian Communist Party (Bolsheviks) (Note: Russian: Российская коммунистическая партия (большевиков), romanized: Rossiyskaya kommunisticheskaya partiya (bol'shevikov), lit. 'Russian Communist Party ([of] Bolsheviks])'. Abbreviated in Russian as РКП(б), RKP(b). Party name in 1918–1925.) and the All-Union Communist Party (Bolsheviks), (Note: Russian: Всесоюзная коммунистическая партия (большевиков), romanized: Vsesoyuznaya kommunisticheskaya partiya (bol'shevikov), lit. 'All-Union Communist Party ([of] Bolsheviks])' Abbreviated in Russian as ВКП(б), VKP(b). Party name in 1925–1952.) was the founding and ruling political party of the Soviet Union. The CPSU was the sole governing party of the Soviet Union until 1990 when the Congress of People's Deputies modified Article 6 of the 1977 Soviet Constitution, which had previously granted the CPSU a monopoly over the political system. The party's main ideology was Marxism–Leninism. The party was outlawed under Russian president Boris Yeltsin's decree on 6 November 1991, citing the 1991 Soviet coup attempt as a reason.

The party traces its origins back to 1898 with the founding of the Russian Social Democratic Labour Party (RSDLP). In 1903, the RSDLP split into the Menshevik (m) ("minority") and Bolshevik (b) ("majority") factions. Led by Vladimir Lenin, the Bolsheviks formally established themselves as an independent party in 1912 known as the Russian Social Democratic Labour Party (Bolsheviks), or RSDLP(b). After seizing power in the October Revolution of 1917, the party adopted the "Communist" name in 1918 and officially became the CPSU in 1952. Its activities were suspended on Soviet territory on 29 August 1991, shortly after a failed coup d'état by conservative party leaders against the reforming Soviet president and party general secretary, Mikhail Gorbachev.

The CPSU was a communist party based on democratic centralism. This principle, conceived by Lenin, entails democratic and open discussion of policy issues within the party, followed by the requirement of total unity in upholding the agreed policies. The highest body within the CPSU was the Party Congress, which convened every five years. When the Congress was not in session, the Central Committee was the highest body. Because the Central Committee met twice a year, most day-to-day duties and responsibilities were vested in the Politburo, (previously the Presidium), the Secretariat and the Orgburo (until 1952). The party leader was the head of government and held the office of either General Secretary, Premier or head of state, or two of the three offices concurrently, but never all three at the same time. The party leader was the de facto chairman of the CPSU Politburo and chief executive of the Soviet Union. The tension between the party and the state (Council of Ministers of the Soviet Union) for the shifting focus of power was never formally resolved.

After the founding of the Soviet Union in 1922, Lenin had introduced a mixed economy, commonly referred to as the New Economic Policy, which allowed for capitalist practices to resume under the Communist Party dictation in order to develop the necessary conditions for socialism to become a practical pursuit in the economically undeveloped country. In 1929, as Joseph Stalin became the leader of the party, Marxism–Leninism, a fusion of the original ideas of German philosopher and economic theorist Karl Marx, and Lenin, became formalized by Stalin as the party's guiding ideology and would remain so throughout the rest of its existence. The party pursued state socialism, under which all industries were nationalized, and a command economy was implemented. After recovering from the Second World War, reforms were implemented which decentralized economic planning and liberalized Soviet society in general under Nikita Khrushchev.

By 1980, various factors, including the continuing Cold War, and ongoing nuclear arms race with the United States and other Western European powers and unaddressed inefficiencies in the economy, led to stagnant economic growth under Alexei Kosygin, and further with Leonid Brezhnev and growing disillusionment. After the younger, vigorous Mikhail Gorbachev assumed leadership in 1985 (following two short-term elderly leaders, Yuri Andropov and Konstantin Chernenko, who quickly died in succession), rapid steps were taken to transform the tottering Soviet economic system in the direction of a market economy once again. Gorbachev and his allies envisioned the introduction of an economy similar to Lenin's earlier New Economic Policy through a program of "perestroika", or restructuring, but their reforms, along with the institution of free multi-candidate elections led to a decline in the party's power, and after the dissolution of the Soviet Union, the banning of the party by later last RSFSR president Boris Yeltsin and subsequent first president of the successor Russian Federation.

A number of causes contributed to CPSU's loss of control and the dissolution of the Soviet Union during the early 1990s. Some historians have written that Gorbachev's policy of "glasnost" (political openness) was the root cause, noting that it weakened the party's control over society. Gorbachev maintained that perestroika without glasnost was doomed to failure anyway. Others have blamed the economic stagnation and subsequent loss of faith by the general populace in communist ideology. In the final years of the CPSU's existence, the Communist Parties of the federal subjects of Russia were united into the Communist Party of the Russian Soviet Federative Socialist Republic (RSFSR). After the CPSU's demise, the Communist Parties of the Union Republics became independent and underwent various separate paths of reform. In Russia, the Communist Party of the Russian Federation emerged and has been regarded as the inheritor of the CPSU's old Bolshevik legacy into the present day.

== History ==
=== Name ===
- 16 August 1917 – 8 March 1918: Russian Social Democratic Labour Party (Bolsheviks) (Russian: Российская социал-демократическая рабочая партия (большевиков); РСДРП(б), romanized: Rossiyskaya sotsial-demokraticheskaya rabochaya partiya (bol'shevikov); RSDRP(b))
- 8 March 1918 – 31 December 1925: Russian Communist Party (Bolsheviks) (Russian: Российская коммунистическая партия (большевиков); РКП(б), romanized: Rossiyskaya kommunisticheskaya partiya (bol'shevikov); RKP(b)). During the Extraordinary Seventh Congress of the R.C.P.(B.) which ran from March 6th to March 8th, the Russian Social Democratic Labour Party of Bolsheviks renamed themselves to the Russian Communist Party (Bolsheviks). The name persisted until the Fourteenth Congress of the C.P.S.U.(B.) in 1925.
- 31 December 1925 – 14 October 1952: All-Union Communist Party (Bolsheviks) (Russian: Всесоюзная коммунистическая партия (большевиков); ВКП(б), romanized: Vsesoyuznaya kommunisticheskaya partiya (bol'shevikov); VKP(b))
- 14 October 1952 – 6 November 1991: Communist Party of the Soviet Union (Russian: Коммунистическая партия Советского Союза; КПСС, romanized: Kommunisticheskaya partiya Sovetskogo Soyuza; KPSS). During the Nineteenth Congress of the CPSU (b) which ran from October 5th to October 14th, the All‐Union Communist Party of the Bolsheviks renamed themselves to the Communist Party of the Soviet Union on October 13th. The Bolshevik part of the name was dropped due to the lack of political prevalence of the Mensheviks, disregarding the need for distinction of the Communist Party.

=== Early years (1898–1924) ===
The origin of the CPSU was in the Bolshevik faction of the Russian Social Democratic Labour Party (RSDLP). This faction arose out of the split between followers of Julius Martov and Vladimir Lenin in August 1903 at the Party's second conference. Martov's followers were called the Mensheviks (which means minority in Russian); and Lenin's, the Bolsheviks (majority). (The two factions were in fact of fairly equal numerical size.) The split became more formalized in 1914, when the factions became named the Russian Social Democratic Labour Party (Bolsheviks), and Russian Social Democratic Labour Party (Mensheviks). Prior to the February Revolution, the first phase of the Russian Revolutions of 1917, the party worked underground as organized anti-Tsarist groups. By the time of the revolution, many of the party's central leaders, including Lenin, were in exile.

After Emperor Nicholas II (1868–1918, reigned 1894–1917) abdicated in March 1917, a republic was established and administered by a provisional government, which was largely dominated by the interests of the military, former nobility, major capitalists business owners and democratic socialists. Alongside it, grassroots general assemblies spontaneously formed, called soviets, and a dual-power structure between the soviets and the provisional government was in place until such a time that their differences would be reconciled in a post-provisional government. Lenin was at this time in exile in Switzerland where he, with other dissidents in exile, managed to arrange with the Imperial German government safe passage through Germany in a sealed train back to Russia through the continent amidst the ongoing World War. In April, Lenin arrived in Petrograd (renamed former St. Petersburg) and condemned the provisional government, calling for the advancement of the revolution towards the transformation of the ongoing war into a war of the working class against capitalism. The rebellion proved not yet to be over, as tensions between the social forces aligned with the soviets (councils) and those with the provisional government now led by Alexander Kerensky (1881–1970, in power 1917), came into explosive tensions during that summer.

The Bolsheviks had rapidly increased their political presence from May onward through the popularity of their program, notably calling for an immediate end to the war, land reform for the peasants, and restoring food allocation to the urban population. This program was translated to the masses through simple slogans that patiently explained their solution to each crisis the revolution created. Up to July, these policies were disseminated through 41 publications, Pravda being the main paper, with a readership of 320,000. This was roughly halved after the repression of the Bolsheviks following the July Days demonstrations so that even by the end of August, the principal paper of the Bolsheviks had a print run of only 50,000 copies. Despite this, their ideas gained them increasing popularity in elections to the soviets.

The factions within the soviets became increasingly polarized in the later summer after armed demonstrations by soldiers at the call of the Bolsheviks and an attempted military coup by commanding Gen. Lavr Kornilov to eliminate the socialists from the provisional government. As the general consensus within the soviets moved leftward, less militant forces began to abandon them, leaving the Bolsheviks in a stronger position. By October, the Bolsheviks were demanding the full transfer of power to the soviets and for total rejection of the Kerensky led provisional government's legitimacy. The provisional government, insistent on maintaining the universally despised war effort on the Eastern Front because of treaty ties with its Allies and fears of Imperial German victory, had become socially isolated and had no enthusiastic support on the streets. On 7 November (25 October, old style), the Bolsheviks led an armed insurrection, which overthrew the Kerensky provisional government and left the soviets as the sole governing force in Russia.

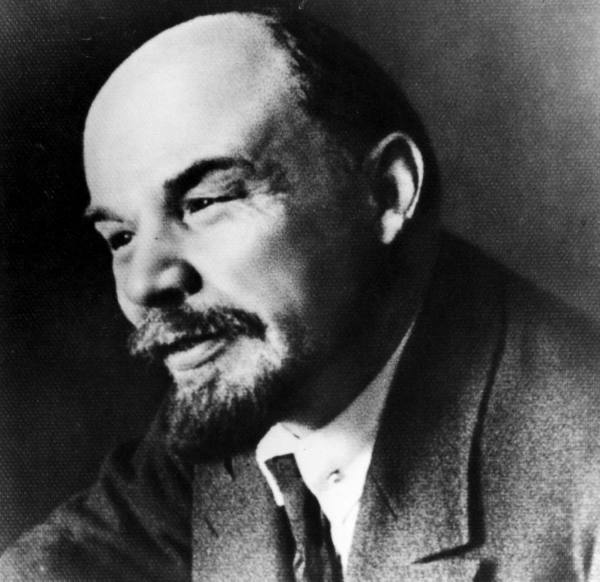
Vladimir Lenin, founder of the Soviet Union and the leader of the Bolshevik party.

In the aftermath of the October Revolution, the soviets united federally and the Russian Socialist Federative Soviet Republic, the world's first constitutionally socialist state, was established. The Bolsheviks were the majority within the soviets and began to fulfill their campaign promises by signing a damaging peace to end the war with the Germans in the Treaty of Brest-Litovsk and transferring estates and imperial lands to workers' and peasants' soviets. In this context, in 1918, RSDLP(b) became All-Russian Communist Party (bolsheviks). Outside of Russia, social-democrats who supported the Soviet government began to identify as communists, while those who opposed it retained the social-democratic label.

In 1921, as the Civil War was drawing to a close, Lenin proposed the New Economic Policy (NEP), a system of state capitalism that started the process of industrialization and post-war recovery. The NEP ended a brief period of intense rationing called "war communism" and began a period of a market economy under Communist dictation. The Bolsheviks believed at this time that Russia, being among the most economically undeveloped and socially backward countries in Europe, had not yet reached the necessary conditions of development for socialism to become a practical pursuit and that this would have to wait for such conditions to arrive under capitalist development as had been achieved in more advanced countries such as England and Germany. On 30 December 1922, the Russian SFSR joined former territories of the Russian Empire to form the Union of Soviet Socialist Republics (USSR), of which Lenin was elected leader. On 9 March 1923, Lenin suffered a stroke, which incapacitated him and effectively ended his role in government. He died on 21 January 1924, only thirteen months after the founding of the Soviet Union, of which he would become regarded as the founding father.

=== Stalin era (1924–1953) ===
After Lenin's death, a power struggle ensued between Joseph Stalin, the party's general secretary, and Leon Trotsky, the minister of defence, each with highly contrasting visions for the future direction of the country. Trotsky sought to implement a policy of permanent revolution, which was predicated on the notion that the Soviet Union would not be able to survive in a socialist character when surrounded by hostile governments and therefore concluded that it was necessary to actively support similar revolutions in the more advanced capitalist countries. Stalin, however, argued that such a foreign policy would not be feasible with the capabilities then possessed by the Soviet Union and that it would invite the country's destruction by engaging in armed conflict. Rather, Stalin argued that the Soviet Union should, in the meantime, pursue peaceful coexistence and invite foreign investment in order to develop the country's economy and build socialism in one country.

Ultimately, Stalin gained the greatest support within the party, and Trotsky, who was increasingly viewed as a collaborator with outside forces in an effort to depose Stalin, was isolated and subsequently expelled from the party and exiled from the country in 1928. Stalin's policies henceforth would later become collectively known as Stalinism. In 1925, the name of the party was changed to the All-Union Communist Party (Bolsheviks), reflecting that the republics outside of Russia proper were no longer part of an all-encompassing Russian state. The acronym was usually transliterated as VKP(b), or sometimes VCP(b). Stalin sought to formalize the party's ideological outlook into a philosophical hybrid of the original ideas of Lenin with orthodox Marxism into what would be called Marxism–Leninism. Stalin's position as General Secretary became the top executive position within the party, giving Stalin significant authority over party and state policy.

By the end of the 1920s, diplomatic relations with Western countries were deteriorating to the point that there was a growing fear of another allied attack on the Soviet Union. Within the country, the conditions of the NEP had enabled growing inequalities between increasingly wealthy strata and the remaining poor. The combination of these tensions led the party leadership to conclude that it was necessary for the government's survival to pursue a new policy that would centralize economic activity and accelerate industrialization. To do this, the first five-year plan was implemented in 1928. The plan doubled the industrial workforce, proletarianizing many of the peasants by removing them from their land and assembling them into urban centers. Peasants who remained in agricultural work were also made to have a similarly proletarian relationship to their labor through the policies of collectivization, which turned feudal-style farms into collective farms which would be in a cooperative nature under the direction of the state. These two shifts changed the base of Soviet society towards a more working-class alignment. The plan was fulfilled ahead of schedule in 1932.

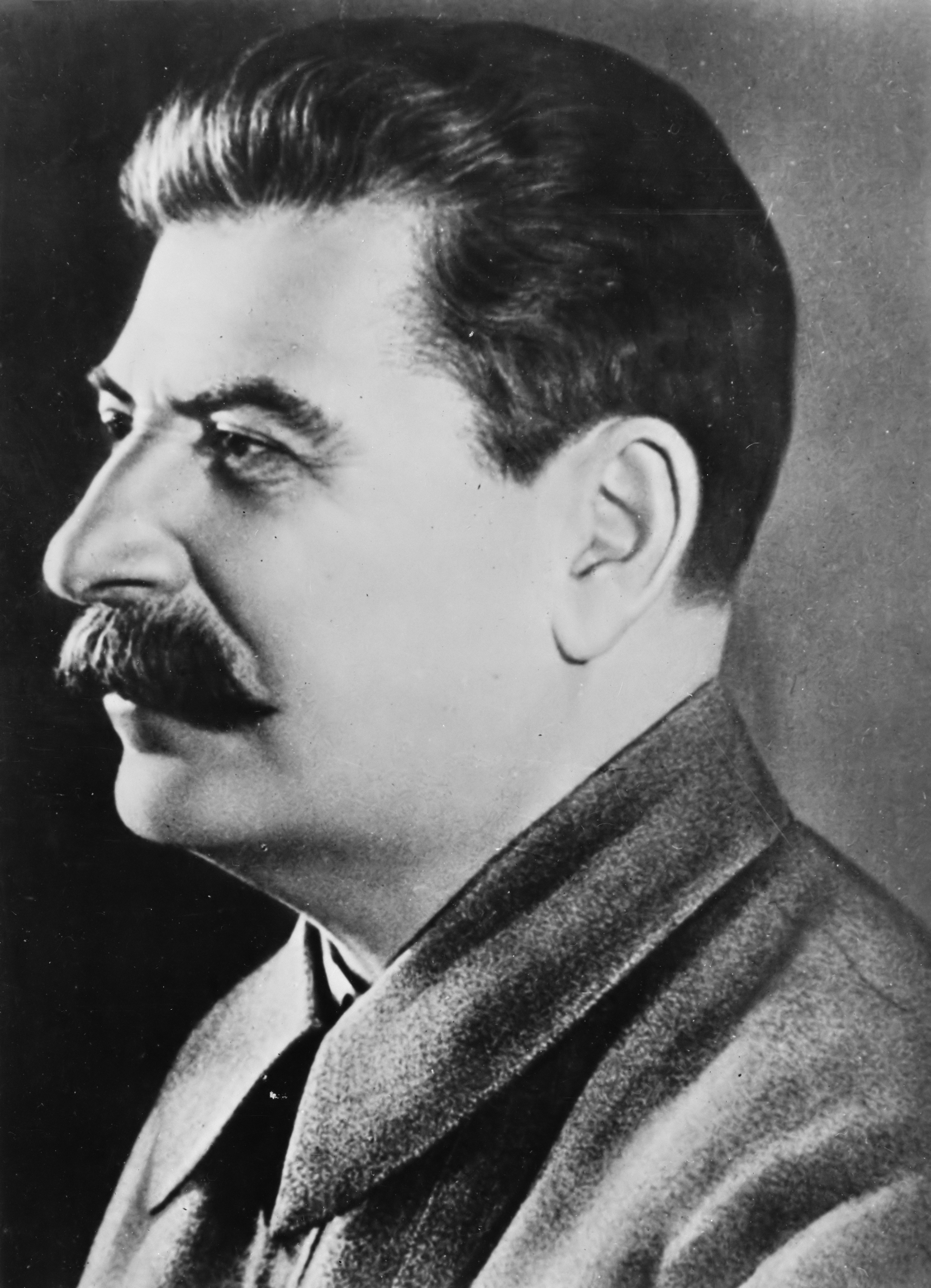
Josef Stalin led the Soviet Union from the late 1920s until his death in 1953, rapidly industrializing the country during the global Great Depression and leading the military defeat of Germany during World War II. After his death, the repressive aspects of his leadership were criticized by the party and became a divisive matter for the rest of its history.

The success of industrialization in the Soviet Union led Western countries, such as the United States, to open diplomatic relations with the Soviet government. In 1933, after years of unsuccessful workers' revolutions (including a short-lived Bavarian Soviet Republic) and spiraling economic calamity, Adolf Hitler came to power in Germany, violently suppressing the revolutionary organizers and posing a direct threat to the Soviet Union that ideologically supported them. The threat of fascist sabotage and imminent attack greatly exacerbated the already existing tensions within the Soviet Union and the Communist Party. A wave of paranoia overtook Stalin and the party leadership and spread through Soviet society. Seeing potential enemies everywhere, leaders of the government security apparatuses began severe crackdowns known as the Great Purge. In total, hundreds of thousands of people, many of whom were posthumously recognized as innocent, were arrested and either sent to prison camps or executed. Also during this time, a campaign against religion was waged in which the Russian Orthodox Church, which had long been a political arm of Tsarism before the revolution, was ruthlessly repressed, organized religion was generally removed from public life and made into a completely private matter, with many churches, mosques and other shrines being repurposed or demolished.

The Soviet Union warned the international community of the potential danger of aggression by Nazi Germany. The Western powers, however, remained committed to maintaining peace and avoiding another war breaking out. Many considered the Soviet Union's warnings to be an unwanted provocation. After many unsuccessful attempts to create an anti-fascist alliance among the Western countries, including trying to rally international support for the Spanish Republic in its struggle against a nationalist military rebellion supported by Germany and Italy, in 1939 the Soviet Union signed a non-aggression pact with Germany, later jointly invading and partitioning Poland to fulfil a secret protocol of the pact, as well as occupying the Baltic States. This pact would be broken in June 1941 when the German military invaded the Soviet Union in the largest land invasion in history, beginning the Great Patriotic War.

The Communist International was dissolved in 1943 after it was concluded that such an organization had failed to prevent the rise of fascism and the global war necessary to defeat it. After the 1945 Allied victory in World War II, the Party held to a doctrine of establishing socialist governments in the post-war occupied territories that would be administered by Communists loyal to Stalin's administration. The party also sought to expand its sphere of influence beyond the occupied territories, using proxy wars and espionage and providing training and funding to promote Communist elements abroad, leading to the establishment of the Cominform in 1947.

In 1949, the Chinese Communist Party emerged victorious in the Chinese Civil War. This caused a major shift in the global balance of forces and greatly escalated tensions between the Communists and the Western powers, fueling the Cold War. In Europe, Yugoslavia, under the leadership of Josip Broz Tito, acquired the territory of Trieste, causing conflict both with the Western powers and with Stalin, who opposed such a provocative move. Furthermore, the Yugoslav Communists actively supported the Greek Communists during their civil war, further frustrating the Soviet government. These tensions led to a Tito–Stalin split, which marked the beginning of international sectarian division within the world Communist movement.

=== Post-Stalin years (1953–1985) ===
After Stalin's death, Nikita Khrushchev rose to the top post by overcoming political adversaries, including Lavrentiy Beria and Georgy Malenkov, in a power struggle. In 1955, Khrushchev achieved the demotion of Malenkov and secured his own position as Soviet leader. Early in his rule and with the support of several members of the Presidium, Khrushchev initiated the Thaw, which effectively ended the Stalinist mass terror of the prior decades and reduced socio-economic oppression considerably. At the 20th Congress held in 1956, Khrushchev denounced Stalin's crimes, being careful to omit any reference to complicity by any sitting Presidium members. His economic policies, while bringing about improvements, were not enough to fix the fundamental problems of the Soviet economy. The standard of living for ordinary citizens did increase; 108 million people moved into new housing between 1956 and 1965.

Khrushchev's foreign policies led to the Sino-Soviet split, in part a consequence of his public denunciation of Stalin. Khrushchev improved relations with Josip Broz Tito's League of Communists of Yugoslavia but failed to establish the close, party-to-party relations that he wanted. While the Thaw reduced political oppression at home, it led to unintended consequences abroad, such as the Hungarian Revolution of 1956 and unrest in Poland, where the local citizenry now felt confident enough to rebel against Soviet control. Khrushchev also failed to improve Soviet relations with the West, partially because of a hawkish military stance. In the aftermath of the Cuban Missile Crisis, Khrushchev's position within the party was substantially weakened. Shortly before his eventual ousting, he tried to introduce economic reforms championed by Evsei Liberman, a Soviet economist, which tried to implement market mechanisms into the planned economy.

Khrushchev was ousted on 14 October 1964 in a Central Committee plenum that officially cited his inability to listen to others, his failure in consulting with the members of the Presidium, his establishment of a cult of personality, his economic mismanagement, and his anti-party reforms as the reasons he was no longer fit to remain as head of the party. He was succeeded in office by Leonid Brezhnev as First Secretary and Alexei Kosygin as Chairman of the Council of Ministers.

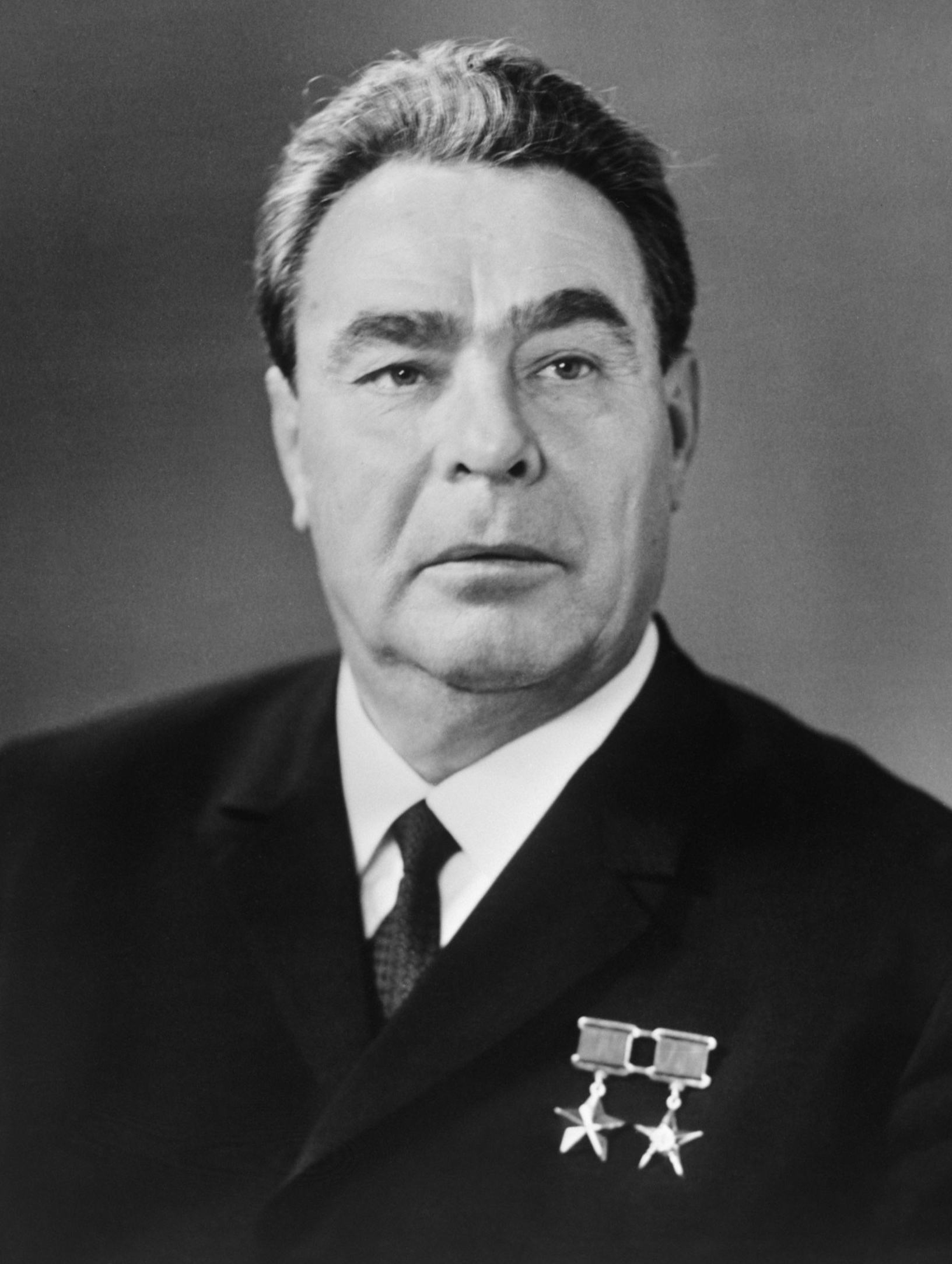
Leonid Brezhnev's leadership from the mid-1960s until his death in 1982 was defined by domestic stability and pivotal shifts in foreign relations. His tenure was criticized posthumously as an Era of Stagnation, a term coined by CPSU general secretary Gorbachev.

The Brezhnev era began with a rejection of Khrushchevism in virtually every arena except one: continued opposition to Stalinist methods of terror and political violence. Khrushchev's policies were criticized as voluntarism, and the Brezhnev period saw the rise of neo-Stalinism. While Stalin was never rehabilitated during this period, the most conservative journals in the country were allowed to highlight positive features of his rule.

At the 23rd Congress held in 1966, the names of the office of First Secretary and the body of the Presidium reverted to their original names: General Secretary and Politburo, respectively. At the start of his premiership, Kosygin experimented with economic reforms similar to those championed by Malenkov, including prioritizing light industry over heavy industry to increase the production of consumer goods. Similar reforms were introduced in Hungary under the name New Economic Mechanism; however, with the rise to power of Alexander Dubček in Czechoslovakia, who called for the establishment of "socialism with a human face", all non-conformist reform attempts in the Soviet Union were stopped.

During his rule, Brezhnev supported détente, a passive weakening of animosity with the West with the goal of improving political and economic relations. However, by the 25th Congress held in 1976, political, economic and social problems within the Soviet Union began to mount, and the Brezhnev administration found itself in an increasingly difficult position. The previous year, Brezhnev's health began to deteriorate. He became addicted to painkillers and needed to take increasingly more potent medications to attend official meetings. Because of the "trust in cadres" policy implemented by his administration, the CPSU leadership evolved into a gerontocracy. At the end of Brezhnev's rule, problems continued to amount; in 1979 he consented to the Soviet intervention in Afghanistan to save the embattled communist regime there and supported the oppression of the Solidarity movement in Poland. As problems grew at home and abroad, Brezhnev was increasingly ineffective in responding to the growing criticism of the Soviet Union by Western leaders, most prominently by US presidents Jimmy Carter and Ronald Reagan, and UK prime minister Margaret Thatcher. The CPSU, which had wishfully interpreted the financial crisis of the 1970s as the beginning of the end of capitalism, found its country falling far behind the West in its economic development. Brezhnev died on 10 November 1982, and was succeeded by Yuri Andropov on 12 November.

Andropov, a staunch anti-Stalinist, chaired the KGB during most of Brezhnev's reign. He had appointed several reformers to leadership positions in the KGB, many of whom later became leading officials under Gorbachev. Andropov supported increased openness in the press, particularly regarding the challenges facing the Soviet Union. Andropov was in office briefly, but he appointed a number of reformers, including Yegor Ligachev, Nikolay Ryzhkov, and Mikhail Gorbachev, to important positions. He also supported a crackdown on absenteeism and corruption. Andropov had intended to let Gorbachev succeed him in office, but Konstantin Chernenko and his supporters suppressed the paragraph in the letter which called for Gorbachev's elevation. Andropov died on 9 February 1984 and was succeeded by Chernenko. The elderly Chernenko was in poor health throughout his short leadership and was unable to consolidate power; effective control of the party organization remained with Gorbachev. When Chernenko died on 10 March 1985, his succession was already settled in favor of Gorbachev.

=== Gorbachev and the party's demise (1985–1991) ===
The Politburo did not want another elderly and frail leader after its previous three leaders, and elected Gorbachev as CPSU General Secretary on 11 March 1985, one day after Chernenko's death. When Gorbachev acceded to power, the Soviet Union was stagnating but was stable and might have continued largely unchanged into the 21st century if not for Gorbachev's reforms.

Gorbachev conducted a significant personnel reshuffling of the CPSU leadership, forcing old party conservatives out of office. In 1985 and early 1986 the new leadership of the party called for uskoreniye (Russian: ускоре́ние, lit. 'acceleration'). Gorbachev reinvigorated the party ideology, adding new concepts and updating older ones. Positive consequences of this included the allowance of "pluralism of thought" and a call for the establishment of "socialist pluralism" (literally, socialist democracy). Gorbachev introduced a policy of glasnost (Russian: гла́сность, meaning openness or transparency) in 1986, which led to a wave of unintended democratization. According to the British researcher of Russian affairs, Archie Brown, the democratization of the Soviet Union brought mixed blessings to Gorbachev; it helped him to weaken his conservative opponents within the party but brought out accumulated grievances which had been suppressed during the previous decades.

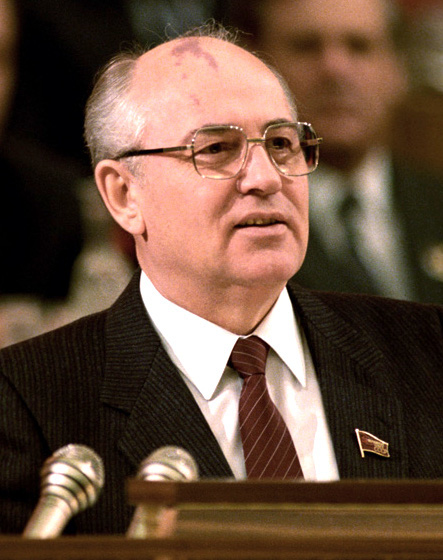
Mikhail Gorbachev, the last leader of the CPSU and the Soviet Union, implemented major reforms to restructure the economy and state which would prove fatal for both.

In reaction to these changes, a conservative movement gained momentum in 1987 in response to Boris Yeltsin's dismissal as First Secretary of the CPSU Moscow City Committee. On 13 March 1988, Nina Andreyeva, a university lecturer, wrote an article titled "I Cannot Forsake My Principles". The publication was planned to occur when both Gorbachev and his protege Alexander Yakovlev were visiting foreign countries. In their place, Yegor Ligachev led the party organization and told journalists that the article was "a benchmark for what we need in our ideology today". Upon Gorbachev's return, the article was discussed at length during a Politburo meeting; it was revealed that nearly half of its members were sympathetic to the letter and opposed further reforms which could weaken the party. The meeting lasted for two days, but on 5 April a Politburo resolution responded with a point-by-point rebuttal to Andreyeva's article.

Gorbachev convened the 19th Party Conference in June 1988. He criticized leading party conservatives—Ligachev, Andrei Gromyko and Mikhail Solomentsev. In turn, conservative delegates attacked Gorbachev and the reformers. According to Brown, there had not been as much open discussion and dissent at a party meeting since the early 1920s.

Despite the deep-seated opposition to further reform, the CPSU remained hierarchical; the conservatives acceded to Gorbachev's demands in deference to his position as the CPSU General Secretary. The 19th Conference approved the establishment of the Congress of People's Deputies (CPD) and allowed for contested elections between the CPSU and independent candidates. Other organized parties were not allowed. The CPD was elected in 1989; one-third of the seats were appointed by the CPSU and other public organizations to sustain the Soviet one-party state. The elections were democratic, but most elected CPD members opposed any more radical reform. The elections featured the highest electoral turnout in Russian history; no election before or since had a higher participation rate. An organized opposition was established within the legislature under the name Inter-Regional Group of Deputies by dissident Andrei Sakharov. An unintended consequence of these reforms was the increased anti-CPSU pressure; in March 1990, at a session of the Supreme Soviet of the Soviet Union, the party was forced to relinquish its political monopoly of power, in effect turning the Soviet Union into a liberal democracy.

The CPSU's demise began in March 1990, when state bodies eclipsed party elements in power. From then until the Soviet Union's disestablishment, Gorbachev ruled the country through the newly created post of President of the Soviet Union. Following this, the central party apparatus did not play a practical role in Soviet affairs. Gorbachev had become independent from the Politburo and faced few constraints from party leaders.

In the summer of 1990 the party convened the 28th Congress. A new Politburo was elected, previous incumbents (except Gorbachev and Vladimir Ivashko, the CPSU Deputy General Secretary) were removed. Later that year, the party began work on a new program with a working title, "Towards a Humane, Democratic Socialism". According to Brown, the program reflected Gorbachev's journey from an orthodox communist to a European social democrat.

The freedoms of thought and organization which Gorbachev allowed led to a rise in nationalism in the Soviet republics, indirectly weakening the central authorities. In response to this, a referendum took place in 1991, in which most of the union republics (Note: The Soviet Republics of Armenia, Estonia, and Georgia all boycotted the 1991 referendum.) voted to preserve the union in a different form. In reaction to this, conservative elements within the CPSU launched the August 1991 coup, which overthrew Gorbachev but failed to preserve the Soviet Union. When Gorbachev resumed control (21 August 1991) after the coup's collapse, he resigned from the CPSU on 24 August 1991 and operations were handed over to Ivashko. On 29 August 1991 the activity of the CPSU was suspended throughout the country, on 6 November Yeltsin banned the activities of the party in Russia and Gorbachev resigned from the presidency on 25 December; the following day the Soviet of Republics dissolved the Soviet Union.

On 30 November 1992, the Constitutional Court of the Russian Federation recognized the ban on the activities of the primary organizations of the Communist Party, formed on a territorial basis, as inconsistent with the Constitution of Russia, but upheld the dissolution of the governing structures of the CPSU and the governing structures of its republican organization—the Communist Party of the RSFSR.

After the dissolution of the Soviet Union in 1991, Russian adherents to the CPSU tradition, particularly as it existed before Gorbachev, reorganized themselves within the Communist Party of the Russian Federation (CPRF). Today a wide range of parties in Russia present themselves as successors of CPSU. Several of them have used the name "CPSU". However, the CPRF is generally seen (due to its massive size) as the heir of the CPSU in Russia. Additionally, the CPRF was initially founded as the Communist Party of the Russian SFSR in 1990 (sometime before the abolition of the CPSU) and was seen by critics as a "Russian-nationalist" counterpart to the CPSU.

== Governing style ==
The style of governance in the party alternated between collective leadership and a cult of personality. Collective leadership split power between the Politburo, the Central Committee, and the Council of Ministers to hinder any attempts to create a one-man dominance over the Soviet political system. By contrast, Stalin's period as leader was characterized by an extensive cult of personality. Regardless of leadership style, all political power in the Soviet Union was concentrated in the organization of the CPSU.

=== Democratic centralism ===
Democratic centralism is an organizational principle conceived by Lenin. According to Soviet pronouncements, democratic centralism was distinguished from "bureaucratic centralism", which referred to high-handed formulae without knowledge or discussion. In democratic centralism, decisions are taken after discussions, but once the general party line has been formed, discussion on the subject must cease. No member or organizational institution may dissent on a policy after it has been agreed upon by the party's governing body; to do so would lead to expulsion from the party (formalized at the 10th Congress). Because of this stance, Lenin initiated a ban on factions, which was approved at the 10th Congress.

Lenin believed that democratic centralism safeguarded both party unity and ideological correctness. He conceived of the system after the events of 1917 when several socialist parties "deformed" themselves and actively began supporting nationalist sentiments. Lenin intended that the devotion to policy required by centralism would protect the parties from such revisionist ills and bourgeois deformation of socialism. Lenin supported the notion of a highly centralized vanguard party, in which ordinary party members elected the local party committee, the local party committee elected the regional committee, the regional committee elected the Central Committee, and the Central Committee elected the Politburo, Orgburo, and the Secretariat. Lenin believed that the party needed to be ruled from the center and have at its disposal power to mobilize party members at will. This system was later introduced in communist parties abroad through the Communist International (Comintern).

=== Vanguardism ===
A central tenet of Leninism was that of the vanguard party. In a capitalist society, the party was to represent the interests of the working class and all of those who were exploited by capitalism in general; however, it was not to become a part of that class. Lenin decided that the party's sole responsibility was to articulate and plan the long-term interests of the oppressed classes. It was not responsible for the daily grievances of those classes; that was the responsibility of the trade unions. According to Lenin, the party and the oppressed classes could never become one because the party was responsible for leading the oppressed classes to victory. The basic idea was that a small group of organized people could wield power disproportionate to their size with superior organizational skills. Despite this, until the end of his life, Lenin warned of the danger that the party could be taken over by bureaucrats, by a small clique, or by an individual. Toward the end of his life, he criticized the bureaucratic inertia of certain officials and admitted to problems with some of the party's control structures, which were to supervise organizational life.

== Organization ==
=== Party leader ===
The party's top official was the head of the Central Committee, whose title and political weight changed over time. Between 1922 and 1952, the General Secretary became the key coordinating position of the Central Committee apparatus and, under Joseph Stalin, the principal source of personal power within the party-state. After Stalin's death, the post was renamed First Secretary (1953–1966), reflecting an official preference for collective leadership, and the title General Secretary was restored in 1966.

Although the party leader did not always hold the same state offices, the position normally acted as the de facto chief executive of the Soviet system by setting the political agenda, shaping кадровые решения (personnel decisions), and arbitrating conflicts between major institutions.

=== Territorial hierarchy ===
- Communist Party of the Soviet Union (Central Committee)
  - Communist Party of Armenia (Central Committee)
  - Communist Party of Azerbaijan (Central Committee)
  - Communist Party of Bukhara
  - Communist Party of Byelorussia (Central Committee)
  - Communist Party of Estonia (Central Committee)
  - Communist Party of Georgia (Central Committee)
  - Communist Party of the Karelia-Finland SSR (Central Committee)
  - Communist Party of Kazakhstan (Central Committee)
  - Communist Party of Kirgizia (Central Committee)
  - Communist Party of Khorezm
- Communist Party of the Soviet Union (Central Committee)
  - Communist Party of Latvia (Central Committee)
  - Communist Party of Lithuania (Central Committee)
  - Communist Party of Lithuania and Byelorussia (Central Committee)
  - Communist Party of Moldavia–Moldova (Central Committee)
  - Communist Party of the Russian SFSR (Central Committee)
  - Communist Party of Tajikistan (Central Committee)
  - Communist Party of Turkestan (Central Committee)
  - Communist Party of Turkmenistan (Central Committee)
  - Communist Party of Ukraine (Central Committee)
  - Communist Party of Uzbekistan (Central Committee)

The CPSU was structured as a nested territorial system: union-republic parties (where applicable), regional (oblast/kray) committees, city and district (raion) committees, and workplace or institutional primary party organizations (PPOs). At each level, a committee and its leading secretary coordinated implementation of higher directives, supervised local кадровые decisions, and linked party authority to state agencies, enterprises, and mass organizations.

=== Congress ===
The Congress, nominally the highest organ of the party, was convened every five years. Leading up to the October Revolution and until Stalin's consolidation of power, the Congress was the party's main decision-making body. However, after Stalin's ascension, the Congresses became largely symbolic. CPSU leaders used Congresses as a propaganda and control tool. The most noteworthy Congress since the 1930s was the 20th Congress, in which Khrushchev denounced Stalin in a speech titled "The Personality Cult and its Consequences".

Despite delegates to Congresses losing their powers to criticize or remove party leadership, the Congresses functioned as a form of elite-mass communication. They were occasions for the party leadership to express the party line over the next five years to ordinary CPSU members and the general public. The information provided was general, ensuring that party leadership retained the ability to make specific policy changes as they saw fit.

The Congresses also provided the party leadership with formal legitimacy by providing a mechanism for the election of new members and the retirement of old members who had lost favor. The elections at Congresses were all predetermined and the candidates who stood for seats to the Central Committee and the Central Auditing Commission were approved beforehand by the Politburo and the Secretariat. A Congress could also provide a platform for the announcement of new ideological concepts. For instance, at the 22nd Congress, Khrushchev announced that the Soviet Union would see "communism in twenty years"— a position later retracted.

A Conference, officially referred to as an All-Union Conference, was convened between Congresses by the Central Committee to discuss party policy and to make personnel changes within the Central Committee. 19 conferences were convened during the CPSU's existence. The 19th Congress held in 1952 removed the clause in the party's statute which stipulated that a party Conference could be convened. The clause was reinstated at the 23rd Congress, which was held in 1966.

==== Central Committee ====
The Central Committee was a collective body elected at the annual party congress. It was mandated to meet at least twice a year to act as the party's supreme governing body. Membership of the Central Committee increased from 71 full members in 1934 to 287 in 1976. Central Committee members were elected to the seats because of the offices they held, not on their personal merit. Because of this, the Central Committee was commonly considered an indicator for Sovietologists to study the strength of the different institutions. The Politburo was elected by and reported to the Central Committee. Besides the Politburo, the Central Committee also elected the Secretariat and the general secretary—the de facto leader of the Soviet Union. In 1919–1952, the Orgburo was also elected in the same manner as the Politburo and the Secretariat by the plenums of the Central Committee. In between Central Committee plenums, the Politburo and the Secretariat were legally empowered to make decisions on its behalf. The Central Committee or the Politburo and/or Secretariat on its behalf could issue nationwide decisions; decisions on behalf of the party were transmitted from the top to the bottom.

Under Lenin, the Central Committee functioned much as the Politburo did during the post-Stalin era, serving as the party's governing body. However, as the membership in the Central Committee increased, its role was eclipsed by the Politburo. Between Congresses, the Central Committee functioned as the Soviet leadership's source of legitimacy. The decline in the Central Committee's standing began in the 1920s; it was reduced to a compliant body of the Party leadership during the Great Purge. According to party rules, the Central Committee was to convene at least twice a year to discuss political matters—but not matters relating to military policy. The body remained largely symbolic after Stalin's consolidation; leading party officials rarely attended meetings of the Central Committee.

==== Central Auditing Commission ====
The Central Auditing Commission (CAC) was elected by the party Congresses and reported only to the party Congress. It had about as many members as the Central Committee. It was responsible for supervising the expeditious and proper handling of affairs by the central bodies of the Party; it audited the accounts of the Treasury and the enterprises of the Central Committee. It was also responsible for supervising the Central Committee apparatus, making sure that its directives were implemented and that Central Committee directives complied with the party Statute.

==== Statute ====
The Statute (also referred to as the Rules, Charter and Constitution) was the party's by-laws and controlled life within the CPSU. The 1st Statute was adopted at the 2nd Congress of the Russian Social Democratic Labour Party—the forerunner of the CPSU. How the Statute was to be structured and organized led to a schism within the party, leading to the establishment of two competing factions; Bolsheviks (literally majority) and Mensheviks (literally minority). The 1st Statute was based upon Lenin's idea of a centralized vanguard party. The 4th Congress, despite a majority of Menshevik delegates, added the concept of democratic centralism to Article 2 of the Statute. The 1st Statute lasted until 1919 when the 8th Congress adopted the 2nd Statute. It was nearly five times as long as the 1st Statute and contained 66 articles. It was amended at the 9th Congress. At the 11th Congress, the 3rd Statute was adopted with only minor amendments being made. New statutes were approved at the 17th and 18th Congresses respectively. The last party statute, which existed until the dissolution of the CPSU, was adopted at the 22nd Congress.

=== Central Committee apparatus ===
==== General Secretary ====
General Secretary of the Central Committee was the title given to the overall leader of the party. The office was synonymous with the leader of the Soviet Union after Joseph Stalin's consolidation of power in the 1920s. Stalin used the office of General Secretary to create a strong power base for himself. The office was formally titled First Secretary between 1953 and 1966.

==== Politburo ====
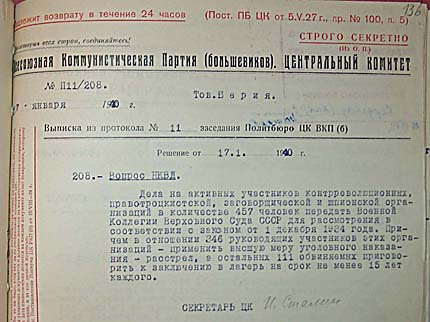
A Politburo resolution to execute 346 "enemies of the CPSU and Soviet Power" who led "counter-revolutionary, right-Trotskyite, plotting and spying activities" (signed by Stalin)

The Political Bureau (Politburo), known as the Presidium from 1952 to 1966, was the highest party organ when the Congress and the Central Committee were not in session. Until the 19th Conference in 1988, the Politburo alongside the Secretariat controlled appointments and dismissals nationwide. In the post-Stalin period, the Politburo controlled the Central Committee apparatus through two channels; the General Department distributed the Politburo's orders to the Central Committee departments and through the personnel overlap which existed within the Politburo and the Secretariat. This personnel overlap gave the CPSU General Secretary a way of strengthening his position within the Politburo through the Secretariat. Kirill Mazurov, Politburo member from 1965 to 1978, accused Brezhnev of turning the Politburo into a "second echelon" of power. He accomplished this by discussing policies before Politburo meetings with Mikhail Suslov, Andrei Kirilenko, Fyodor Kulakov, and Dmitriy Ustinov among others, who held seats both in the Politburo and the Secretariat. Mazurov's claim was later verified by Nikolai Ryzhkov, the Chairman of the Council of Ministers under Gorbachev. Ryzhkov said that Politburo meetings lasted only 15 minutes because the people close to Brezhnev had already decided what was to be approved.

The Politburo was abolished and replaced by a Presidium in 1952 at the 19th Congress. In the aftermath the 19th Congress and the 1st Plenum of the 19th Central Committee, Stalin ordered the creation of the Bureau of the Presidium, which acted as the standing committee of the Presidium. On 6 March 1953, one day after Stalin's death, a new and smaller Presidium was elected, and the Bureau of the Presidium was abolished in a joint session with the Presidium of the Supreme Soviet and the Council of Ministers.

Until 1990, the CPSU General Secretary acted as the informal chairman of the Politburo. During the first decades of the CPSU's existence, the Politburo was officially chaired by the chairman of the Council of People's Commissars; first by Lenin, then by Aleksey Rykov, Molotov, Stalin, and Malenkov. After 1922, when Lenin was incapacitated, Lev Kamenev as Deputy Chairman of the Council of People's Commissars chaired the Politburo's meetings. This tradition lasted until Khrushchev's consolidation of power. In the first post-Stalin years, when Malenkov chaired Politburo meetings, Khrushchev as First Secretary signed all Central Committee documents into force. From 1954 until 1958, Khrushchev chaired the Politburo as First Secretary, but in 1958 he dismissed and succeeded Nikolai Bulganin as Chairman of the Council of Ministers. During this period, the informal position of Second Secretary—later formalized as Deputy General Secretary—was established. The Second Secretary became responsible for chairing the Secretariat in place of the General Secretary. When the General Secretary could not chair the meetings of the Politburo, the Second Secretary would take his place. This system survived until the dissolution of the CPSU in 1991.

To be elected to the Politburo, a member had to serve in the Central Committee. The Central Committee elected the Politburo in the aftermath of a party Congress. Members of the Central Committee were given a predetermined list of candidates for the Politburo having only one candidate for each seat; for this reason, the election of the Politburo was usually passed unanimously. The greater the power held by the sitting CPSU General Secretary, the higher the chance that the Politburo membership would be approved.

==== Secretariat ====
The Secretariat headed the CPSU's central apparatus and was solely responsible for the development and implementation of party policies. It was legally empowered to take over the duties and functions of the Central Committee when it was not in plenum (holding a meeting). Many members of the Secretariat concurrently held a seat in the Politburo. According to a Soviet textbook on party procedures, the Secretariat's role was that of "leadership of current work, chiefly in the realm of personnel selection and in the organization of the verification of fulfillment of party-state decisions". "Selections of personnel" (Russian: podbor kadrov) in this instance meant the maintenance of general standards and the criteria for selecting various personnel. "Verification of fulfillment" (Russian: proverka ispolneniia) of party and state decisions meant that the Secretariat instructed other bodies.

The powers of the Secretariat were weakened under Mikhail Gorbachev, and the Central Committee Commissions took over the functions of the Secretariat in 1988. Yegor Ligachev, a Secretariat member, said that the changes completely destroyed the Secretariat's hold on power and made the body almost superfluous. Because of this, the Secretariat rarely met during the next two years. It was revitalized at the 28th Party Congress in 1990, and the Deputy General Secretary became the official head of the Secretariat.

==== Orgburo ====
The Organizational Bureau, or Orgburo, existed from 1919 to 1952 and was one of three leading bodies of the party when the Central Committee was not in session. It was responsible for "organizational questions, the recruitment, and allocation of personnel, the coordination of activities of the party, government and social organizations (e.g., trade unions and youth organizations), improvement to the party's structure, the distribution of information and reports within the party". The 19th Congress abolished the Orgburo and its duties and responsibilities were taken over by the Secretariat. At the beginning, the Orgburo held three meetings a week and reported to the Central Committee every second week. Lenin described the relation between the Politburo and the Orgburo as "the Orgburo allocates forces, while the Politburo decides policy". A decision of the Orgburo was implemented by the Secretariat. However, the Secretariat could make decisions in the Orgburo's name without consulting its members, but if one Orgburo member objected to a Secretariat resolution, the resolution would not be implemented. In the 1920s, if the Central Committee could not convene the Politburo and the Orgburo would hold a joint session in its place.

==== Control Commission ====
The Central Control Commission (CCC) functioned as the party's supreme court. The CCC was established at the 9th All-Russian Conference in September 1920, but rules organizing its procedure were not enacted before the 10th Congress. The 10th Congress formally established the CCC on all party levels and stated that it could only be elected at a party congress or a party conference. The CCC and the CCs were formally independent but had to make decisions through the party committees at their level, which led them in practice to lose their administrative independence. At first, the primary responsibility of the CCs was to respond to party complaints, focusing mostly on party complaints of factionalism and bureaucratism. At the 11th Congress, the brief of the CCs was expanded; it became responsible for overseeing party discipline. In a bid to further centralize the powers of the CCC, a Presidium of the CCC, which functioned in a similar manner to the Politburo in relation to the Central Committee, was established in 1923. At the 18th Congress, party rules regarding the CCC were changed; it was now elected by the Central Committee and was subordinate to the Central Committee.

CCC members could not concurrently be members of the Central Committee. To create an organizational link between the CCC and other central-level organs, the 9th All-Russian Conference created the joint CC–CCC plenums. The CCC was a powerful organ; the 10th Congress allowed it to expel full and candidate Central Committee members and members of their subordinate organs if two-thirds of attendants at a CC–CCC plenum voted for such. At its first such session in 1921, Lenin tried to persuade the joint plenum to expel Alexander Shliapnikov from the party; instead of expelling him, Shliapnikov was given a severe reprimand.

==== Departments ====
The leader of a department was usually given the title "head" (Russian: zaveduiuschchii). In practice, the Secretariat had a major say in the running of the departments; for example, five of eleven secretaries headed their own departments in 1978. Normally, specific secretaries were given supervising duties over one or more departments. Each department established its own cells—called sections—which specialized in one or more fields. During the Gorbachev era, a variety of departments made up the Central Committee apparatus. The Party Building and Cadre Work Department assigned party personnel in the nomenklatura system. The State and Legal Department supervised the armed forces, KGB, the Ministry of Internal Affairs, the trade unions, and the Procuracy. Before 1989, the Central Committee had several departments, but some were abolished that year. Among these departments was the Economics Department that was responsible for the economy as a whole, one for machine building, one for the chemical industry, etc. The party abolished these departments to remove itself from the day-to-day management of the economy in favor of government bodies and a greater role for the market, as a part of the perestroika process. In their place, Gorbachev called for the creations of commissions with the same responsibilities as departments, but giving more independence from the state apparatus. This change was approved at the 19th Conference, which was held in 1988. Six commissions were established by late 1988.

==== Pravda ====
Pravda (The Truth) was the leading newspaper in the Soviet Union. The Organizational Department of the Central Committee was the only organ empowered to dismiss Pravda editors. In 1905, Pravda began as a project by members of the Ukrainian Social Democratic Labour Party. Leon Trotsky was approached about the possibility of running the new paper because of his previous work on Ukrainian newspaper Kyivan Thought. The first issue of Pravda was published on 3 October 1908 in Lvov, where it continued until the publication of the sixth issue in November 1909, when the operation was moved to Vienna, Austria-Hungary. During the Russian Civil War, sales of Pravda were curtailed by Izvestia, the government run newspaper. At the time, the average reading figure for Pravda was 130,000. This Vienna-based newspaper published its last issue in 1912 and was succeeded the same year by a new newspaper dominated by the Bolsheviks, also called Pravda, which was headquartered in St. Petersburg. The paper's main goal was to promote Marxist–Leninist philosophy and expose the lies of the bourgeoisie. In 1975, the paper reached a circulation of 10.6 million. It is currently owned by the Communist Party of the Russian Federation.

==== Higher Party School ====
The Higher Party School (HPS) was the organ responsible for teaching cadres in the Soviet Union. It was the successor of the Communist Academy, which was established in 1918. The HPS was established in 1939 as the Moscow Higher Party School and it offered its students a two-year training course for becoming a CPSU official. It was reorganized in 1956 to that it could offer more specialized ideological training. In 1956, the school in Moscow was opened for students from socialist countries outside the Soviet Union. The Moscow Higher Party School was the party school with the highest standing. The school itself had eleven faculties until a 1972 Central Committee resolution demanded a reorganization of the curriculum. The first regional HPS outside Moscow was established in 1946 and by the early 1950s there were 70 Higher Party Schools. During the reorganization drive of 1956, Khrushchev closed 13 of them and reclassified 29 as inter-republican and inter-oblast schools.

=== Lower-level organization ===
==== Republican and local organization ====
The lowest organ above the primary party organization (PPO) was the district level. Every two years, the local PPO would elect delegates to the district-level party conference, which was overseen by a secretary from a higher party level. The conference elected a Party Committee and First Secretary and re-declared the district's commitment to the CPSU's program. In between conferences, the "raion" party committee—commonly referred to as "raikom"—was vested with ultimate authority. It convened at least six times a year to discuss party directives and to oversee the implementation of party policies in their respective districts, to oversee the implementation of party directives at the PPO-level, and to issue directives to PPOs. 75–80 percent of raikom members were full members, while the remaining 20–25 were non-voting, candidate members. Raikom members were commonly from the state sector, party sector, Komsomol or the trade unions.

Day-to-day responsibility of the raikom was handed over to a Politburo, which usually composed of 12 members. The district-level First Secretary chaired the meetings of the local Politburo and the raikom, and was the direct link between the district and the higher party echelons. The First Secretary was responsible for the smooth running of operations. The raikom was headed by the local apparat—the local agitation department or industry department. A raikom usually had no more than 4 or 5 departments, each of which was responsible for overseeing the work of the state sector but would not interfere in their work.

This system remained identical at all other levels of the CPSU hierarchy. The other levels were cities, oblasts (regions) and republics. The district-level elected delegates to a conference held at least every three years to elect the party committee. The only difference between the oblast and the district level was that the oblast had its own Secretariat and had more departments at its disposal. The oblast's party committee in turn elected delegates to the republican-level Congress, which was held every five years. The Congress then elected the Central Committee of the republic, which in turn elected a First Secretary and a Politburo. Until 1990, the Russian Soviet Federative Socialist Republic was the only republic that did not have its own republican branch, being instead represented by the CPSU Central Committee.

==== Primary party organizations ====
The primary party organization (PPO) was the lowest level in the CPSU hierarchy. PPOs were organized cells consisting of three or more members. A PPO could exist anywhere; for example, in a factory or a student dormitory. They functioned as the party's "eyes and ears" at the lowest level and were used to mobilize support for party policies. All CPSU members had to be a member of a local PPO.

The size of a PPO varied from three people to several hundred, depending upon its setting. In a large enterprise, a PPO usually had several hundred members. In such cases, the PPO was divided into bureaus based upon production-units. Each PPO was led by an executive committee and an executive committee secretary. Each executive committee is responsible for the PPO executive committee and its secretary.

In small PPOs, members met periodically to mainly discuss party policies, ideology, or practical matters. In such a case, the PPO secretary was responsible for collecting party dues, reporting to higher organs, and maintaining the party records. A secretary could be elected democratically through a secret ballot, but that was not often the case; in 1979, only 88 out of the over 400,000 PPOs were elected in this fashion. The remainder were chosen by a higher party organ and ratified by the general meetings of the PPO. The PPO general meeting was responsible for electing delegates to the party conference at either the district- or town-level, depending on where the PPO was located.

==== Membership ====
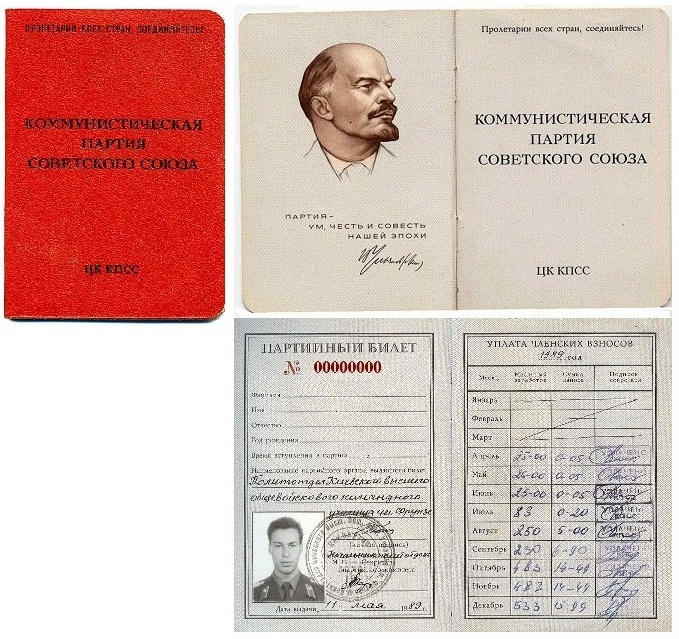
CPSU membership card (1989)

Membership of the party was not open. To become a party member, one had to be approved by various committees, and one's past was closely scrutinized. As generations grew up having known nothing before the Soviet Union, party membership became something one generally achieved after passing a series of stages. Children would join the Young Pioneers and, at the age of 14, might graduate to the Komsomol (Young Communist League). Ultimately, as an adult, if one had shown the proper adherence to party discipline—or had the right connections, one would become a member of the Communist Party itself. Membership of the party carried obligations as it expected Komsomol and CPSU members to pay dues and to carry out appropriate assignments and "social tasks" (общественная работа).

In 1918, party membership was approximately 200,000. In 1924 and 1925, the party engaged in an intensive recruitment campaign targeting workers from the bench known as the "Lenin Enrolment" or "Lenin Levy," swelling party ranks by 608,000 members. This represented an attempt to "reproletarianize" the party. In 1925, the party had 1,025,000 members in a Soviet population of 147 million. In 1927, membership had risen to 1,200,000.

During the collectivization campaign and industrialization campaigns of the first five-year plan from 1929 to 1933, party membership grew rapidly to approximately 3.5 million members. However, party leaders suspected that the mass intake of new members had allowed "social-alien elements" to penetrate the party's ranks and document verifications of membership ensued in 1933 and 1935, removing supposedly unreliable members. Meanwhile, the party closed its ranks to new members from 1933 to November 1936. Even after the reopening of party recruiting, membership fell to 1.9 million by 1939. Nicholas DeWitt gives 2.307 million members in 1939, including candidate members, compared with 1.535 million in 1929 and 6.3 million in 1947.

In 1986, the CPSU had over 19 million members—approximately 10% of the Soviet Union's adult population. Over 44% of party members were classified as industrial workers and 12% as collective farmers. The CPSU had party organizations in 14 of the Soviet Union's 15 republics. The Russian Soviet Federative Socialist Republic itself had no separate Communist Party until 1990 because the CPSU controlled affairs there directly.

=== Komsomol ===
The All-Union Leninist Communist Youth League, commonly referred to as Komsomol, was the party's youth wing. The Komsomol acted under the direction of the CPSU Central Committee. It was responsible for indoctrinating youths in communist ideology and organizing social events. It was closely modeled on the CPSU; nominally the highest body was the Congress, followed by the Central Committee, Secretariat, and the Politburo. The Komsomol participated in nationwide policy-making by appointing members to the collegiums of the Ministry of Culture, the Ministry of Higher and Specialized Secondary Education, the Ministry of Education and, the State Committee for Physical Culture and Sports. The organization's newspaper was the Komsomolskaya Pravda. The First Secretary and the Second Secretary were commonly members of the Central Committee but were never elected to the Politburo. However, at the republican level, several Komsomol first secretaries were appointed to the Politburo.

== Ideology ==
=== Marxism–Leninism ===
Marxism–Leninism was the cornerstone of Soviet ideology. It explained and legitimized the CPSU's right to rule while explaining its role as a vanguard party. For instance, the ideology explained that the CPSU's policies, even if they were unpopular, were correct because the party was enlightened. It was represented as the only truth in Soviet society; the party rejected the notion of multiple truths. Marxism–Leninism was used to justify CPSU rule and Soviet policy, but it was not used as a means to an end. The relationship between ideology and decision-making was at best ambivalent; most policy decisions were made in the light of the continued, permanent development of Marxism–Leninism. Marxism–Leninism as the only truth could not—by its very nature—become outdated.

Despite having evolved over the years, Marxism–Leninism had several central tenets. The main tenet was the party's status as the sole ruling party. The 1977 Constitution referred to the party as "The leading and guiding force of Soviet society, and the nucleus of its political system, of all state and public organizations, is the Communist Party of the Soviet Union". State socialism was essential and from Stalin until Gorbachev, official discourse considered that private social and economic activity obstructed the development of collective consciousness and the economy. Gorbachev supported privatization to a degree but based his policies on Lenin's and Nikolai Bukharin's opinions of the New Economic Policy of the 1920s, and supported complete state ownership over the commanding heights of the economy. Unlike liberalism, Marxism–Leninism stressed the role of the individual as a member of a collective rather than the importance of the individual. Individuals only had the right to freedom of expression if it safeguarded the interests of a collective. For instance, the 1977 Constitution stated that every person had the right to express his or her opinion, but the opinion could only be expressed if it was in accordance with the "general interests of Soviet society". The number of rights granted to an individual was decided by the state, and the state could remove these rights if it saw fit. Soviet Marxism–Leninism justified nationalism; the Soviet media portrayed every victory of the state as a victory for the communist movement as a whole. Largely, Soviet nationalism was based upon ethnic Russian nationalism. Marxism–Leninism stressed the importance of the worldwide conflict between capitalism and socialism; the Soviet press wrote about progressive and reactionary forces while claiming that socialism was on the verge of victory and that the "correlations of forces" were in the Soviet Union's favor. The ideology professed state atheism, and party members were consequently not allowed to be religious.

Marxism–Leninism believed in the feasibility of a communist mode of production. All policies were justifiable if they contributed to the Soviet Union's achievement of that stage.

==== Leninism ====
In Marxist philosophy, Leninism is the body of political theory for the democratic organization of a revolutionary vanguard party and the achievement of a dictatorship of the proletariat, as a political prelude to the establishment of the socialist mode of production, as developed by Lenin. Since Karl Marx rarely, if ever wrote about how the socialist mode of production would function, these tasks were left for Lenin to solve. Lenin's main contribution to Marxist thought is the concept of the vanguard party of the working class. He conceived the vanguard party as a highly knit, centralized organization that was led by intellectuals rather than by the working class itself. The CPSU was open only to a small number of workers because workers in Russia had not yet developed class consciousness and needed to be educated to reach that state. Lenin believed that the vanguard party could initiate policies in the name of the working class even if the working class did not support them. The vanguard party would know what was best for the workers because the party functionaries had attained consciousness.

Lenin, in light of the Marx's theory of the state (which views the state as an oppressive organ of the ruling class), had no qualms of forcing change upon the country. He viewed the dictatorship of the proletariat, rather than the dictatorship of the bourgeoisie, to be the dictatorship of the majority. The repressive powers of the state were to be used to transform the country and to strip the former ruling class of their wealth. Lenin believed that the transition from the capitalist mode of production to the socialist mode of production would last for a long period. According to some authors, Leninism was by definition authoritarian. In contrast to Marx, who believed that the socialist revolution would comprise and be led by the working class alone, Lenin argued that a socialist revolution did not necessarily need to be led or to comprise the working class alone. Instead, he said that a revolution needed to be led by the oppressed classes of society, which in the case of Russia was the peasant class.

==== Stalinism ====
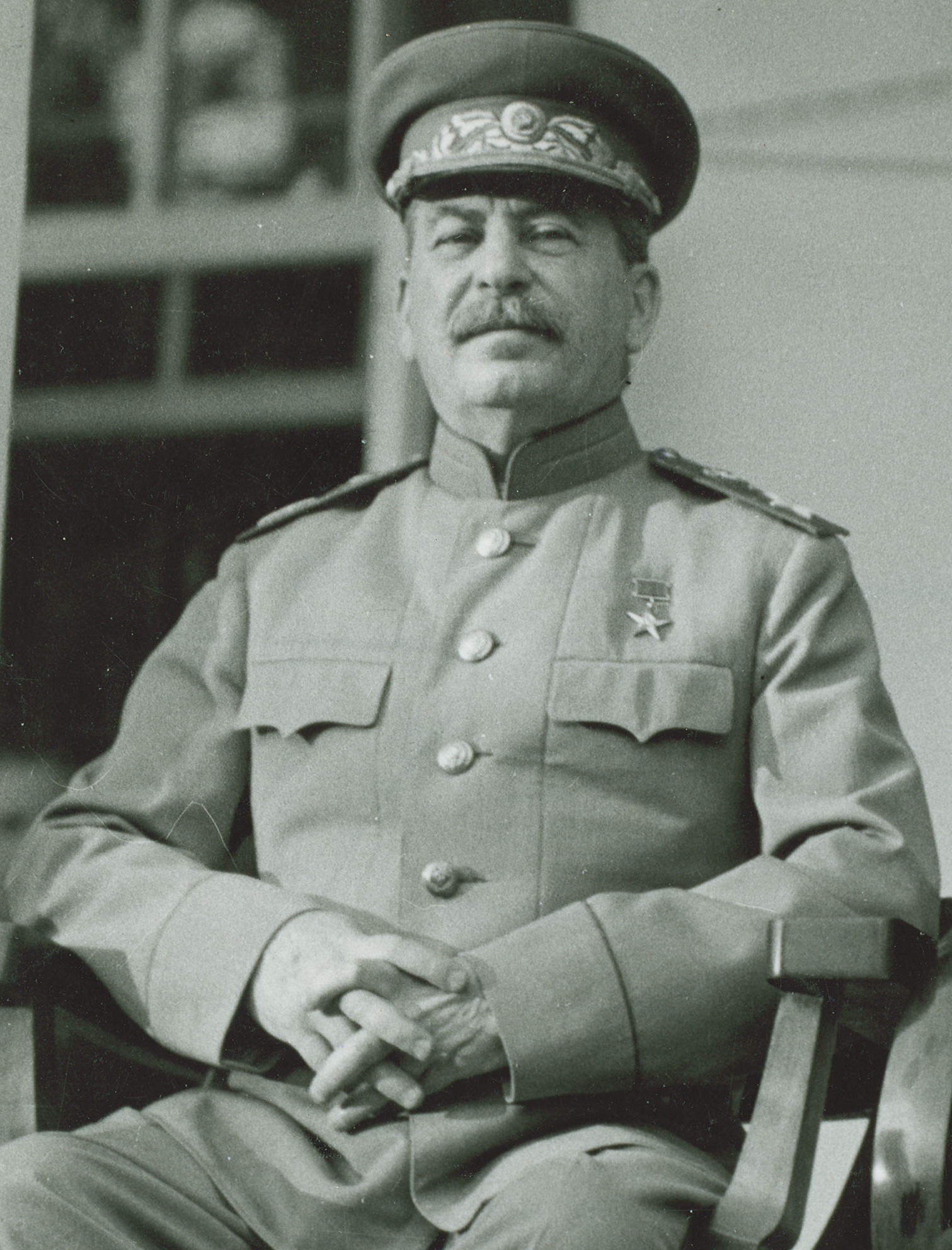
Stalinism, while not an ideology per se, refers to the thoughts and policies of Stalin.

Stalinism, while not an ideology per se, refers to Stalin's thoughts and policies. Stalin's introduction of the concept "Socialism in One Country" in 1924 was an important moment in Soviet ideological discourse. According to Stalin, the Soviet Union did not need a socialist world revolution to construct a socialist society. Four years later, Stalin initiated his "Second Revolution" with the introduction of state socialism and central planning. In the early 1930s, he initiated the collectivization of Soviet agriculture by de-privatizing agriculture and creating peasant cooperatives rather than making it the responsibility of the state. With the initiation of his "Second Revolution", Stalin launched the "Cult of Lenin"—a cult of personality centered upon himself. The name of the city of Petrograd was changed to Leningrad, the town of Lenin's birth was renamed Ulyanov (Lenin's birth-name), the Order of Lenin became the highest state award and portraits of Lenin were hung in public squares, workplaces and elsewhere. The increasing bureaucracy which followed the introduction of a state socialist economy was at complete odds with the Marxist notion of "the withering away of the state". Stalin explained the reasoning behind it at the 16th Congress held in 1930;

We stand for the strengthening of the dictatorship of the proletariat, which represents the mightiest and most powerful authority of all forms of State that have ever existed. The highest development of the State power for the withering away of State power —this is the Marxian formula. Is this contradictory? Yes, it is contradictory. But this contradiction springs from life itself and reflects completely Marxist dialectic.

At the 1939 18th Congress, Stalin abandoned the idea that the state would wither away. In its place, he expressed confidence that the state would exist, even if the Soviet Union reached communism, as long as it was encircled by capitalism. Two key concepts were created in the latter half of his rule: the "two camps" theory and the "capitalist encirclement" theory. The threat of capitalism was used to strengthen Stalin's personal powers, and Soviet propaganda began making a direct link with Stalin and stability in society, saying that the country would crumble without the leader. Stalin deviated greatly from classical Marxism on the subject of "subjective factors"; Stalin said that party members of all ranks had to profess fanatic adherence to the party's line and ideology, if not, those policies would fail.

=== Concepts ===
==== Dictatorship of the proletariat ====
Either the dictatorship of the landowners and capitalists or the dictatorship of the proletariat ... There is no middle course ... There is no middle course anywhere in the world, nor can there be.

— Lenin, claiming that people had only two choices between two different, but distinct class dictatorships

Lenin, supporting Marx's theory of the state, believed democracy to be unattainable anywhere in the world before the proletariat seized power. According to Marxist theory, the state is a vehicle for oppression and is headed by a ruling class. He believed that by his time, the only viable solution was dictatorship since the war was heading into a final conflict between the "progressive forces of socialism and the degenerate forces of capitalism". The Russian Revolution was by 1917, already a failure according to its original aim, which was to act as an inspiration for a world revolution. The initial anti-statist posture and the active campaigning for direct democracy was replaced because of Russia's level of development with—according to their own assessments—dictatorship. The reasoning was Russia's lack of development, its status as the sole socialist state in the world, its encirclement by imperialist powers, and its internal encirclement by the peasantry.

Marx and Lenin did not care whether a bourgeois state was ruled under a republic, parliamentary, or constitutional monarchical system, since this did not change the overall situation. These systems, even if they were ruled by a small clique or ruled through mass participation, were all dictatorships of the bourgeoisie who implemented policies in defense of capitalism. However, there was a difference; after the failures of the world revolutions, Lenin argued that this did not necessarily have to change under the dictatorship of the proletariat. The reasoning came from practical considerations; the majority of the country's inhabitants were not communists, nor could the party reintroduce parliamentary democracy because that was not in synchronization with its ideology and would lead to the party losing power. He, therefore, concluded that the form of government has nothing to do with the nature of the dictatorship of the proletariat.

Bukharin and Trotsky agreed with Lenin; both said that the revolution had destroyed the old but had failed to create anything new. Lenin had now concluded that the dictatorship of the proletariat would not alter the relationship of power between men, but would rather "transform their productive relations so that, in the long run, the realm of necessity could be overcome and, with that, genuine social freedom realized". From 1920 to 1921, Soviet leaders and ideologists began differentiating between socialism and communism; hitherto the two terms had been used interchangeably and used to explain the same things. From then, the two terms had different meanings; Russia was in transition from capitalism to socialism—referred to interchangeably under Lenin as the dictatorship of the proletariat, socialism was the intermediate stage to communism and communism was considered the last stage of social development. By now, the party leaders believed that because of Russia's backward state, universal mass participation and true democracy could only take form in the last stage.

[Because] the proletariat is still so divided, so degraded, so corrupted in parts ... that an organization taking in the whole proletariat cannot directly exercise proletarian dictatorship. It can be exercised only by a vanguard that has absorbed the revolutionary energy of the class.

— Lenin, explaining why the regime had become increasingly dictatorial

In early Bolshevik discourse, the term "dictatorship of the proletariat" was of little significance, and the few times it was mentioned it was likened to the form of government which had existed in the Paris Commune. However, with the ensuing Russian Civil War and the social and material devastation that followed, its meaning altered from commune-type democracy to rule by iron-discipline. By now, Lenin had concluded that only a proletarian regime as oppressive as its opponents could survive in this world. The powers previously bestowed upon the Soviets were now given to the Council of People's Commissars, the central government, which was, in turn, to be governed by "an army of steeled revolutionary Communists [by Communists he referred to the Party]". In a letter to Gavril Myasnikov in late 1920, Lenin explained his new interpretation of the term "dictatorship of the proletariat":

Dictatorship means nothing more nor less than authority untrammeled by any laws, absolutely unrestricted by any rules whatever, and based directly on force. The term 'dictatorship' has no other meaning but this.

Lenin justified these policies by claiming that all states were class states by nature and that these states were maintained through class struggle. This meant that the dictatorship of the proletariat in the Soviet Union could only be "won and maintained by the use of violence against the bourgeoisie". The main problem with this analysis is that the party came to view anyone opposing or holding alternate views of the party as bourgeois. Its worst enemy remained the moderates, which were considered to be "the real agents of the bourgeoisie in the working-class movement, the labor lieutenants of the capitalist class". The term "bourgeoisie" became synonymous with "opponent" and with people who disagreed with the party in general. These oppressive measures led to another reinterpretation of the dictatorship of the proletariat and socialism in general; it was now defined as a purely economic system. Slogans and theoretical works about democratic mass participation and collective decision-making were now replaced with texts which supported authoritarian management. Considering the situation, the party believed it had to use the same powers as the bourgeoisie to transform Russia; there was no alternative. Lenin began arguing that the proletariat, like the bourgeoisie, did not have a single preference for a form of government and because of that, the dictatorship was acceptable to both the party and the proletariat. In a meeting with party officials, Lenin stated—in line with his economist view of socialism—that "Industry is indispensable, democracy is not", further arguing that "we [the Party] do not promise any democracy or any freedom".

==== Anti-imperialism ====
Imperialism is capitalism at the stage of development at which the dominance of monopolies and finance capital is established; in which the export of capital has acquired pronounced importance; in which the division of the world among the international trusts as begun; in which divisions of all territories of the globe among the biggest capitalist powers has been completed.

— Lenin, citing the main features of capitalism in the age of imperialism in Imperialism: the Highest Stage of Capitalism

The Marxist theory on imperialism was conceived by Lenin in his book, Imperialism: the Highest Stage of Capitalism (published in 1917). It was written in response to the theoretical crisis within Marxist thought, which occurred due to capitalism's recovery in the 19th century. According to Lenin, imperialism was a specific stage of development of capitalism; a stage he referred to as state monopoly capitalism. The Marxist movement was split on how to solve capitalism's resurgence after the great depression of the late 19th century. Eduard Bernstein from the Social Democratic Party of Germany (SDP) considered capitalism's revitalization as proof that it was evolving into a more humane system, adding that the basic aims of socialists were not to overthrow the state but to take power through elections. Karl Kautsky, also from the SDP, held a highly dogmatic view; he said that there was no crisis within Marxist theory. Both of them denied or belittled the role of class contradictions in society after the crisis. In contrast, Lenin believed that the resurgence was the beginning of a new phase of capitalism; this stage was created because of a strengthening of class contradiction, not because of its reduction.

Lenin did not know when the imperialist stage of capitalism began; he said it would be foolish to look for a specific year, however, said it began at the beginning of the 20th century (at least in Europe). Lenin believed that the economic crisis of 1900 accelerated and intensified the concentration of industry and banking, which led to the transformation of the finance capital connection to industry into the monopoly of large banks. In Imperialism: the Highest Stage of Capitalism, Lenin wrote; "the twentieth century marks the turning point from the old capitalism to the new, from the domination of capital in general to the domination of finance capital". Lenin defines imperialism as the monopoly stage of capitalism.

The 1986 Party Program claimed the Tsarist regime collapsed because the contradictions of imperialism, which he held to be the gap "between the social nature of production and the private capitalist form of appropriation" manifesting itself in wars, economic recessions, and exploitation of the working class, were strongest in Russia. Imperialism was held to have caused the Russo-Japanese War and the First World War, with the 1905 Russian Revolution presented as "the first people's revolution of the imperialist epoch" and the October Revolution is said to have been rooted in "the nationwide movement against imperialist war and for peace."

==== Peaceful coexistence ====
The loss by imperialism of its dominating role in world affairs and the utmost expansion of the sphere in which the laws of socialist foreign policy operate are a distinctive feature of the present stage of social development. The main direction of this development is toward even greater changes in the correlation of forces in the world arena in favor of socialism.

— Nikolay Inozemtsev, a Soviet foreign policy analyst, referring to series of events (which he believed) would lead to the ultimate victory of socialism

"Peaceful coexistence" was an ideological concept introduced under Khrushchev's rule. While the concept has been interpreted by fellow communists as proposing an end to the conflict between the systems of capitalism and socialism, Khrushchev saw it as a continuation of the conflict in every area except in the military field. The concept said that the two systems were developed "by way of diametrically opposed laws", which led to "opposite principles in foreign policy".

Peaceful coexistence was steeped in Leninist and Stalinist thought. Lenin believed that international politics were dominated by class struggle; in the 1940s Stalin stressed the growing polarization which was occurring in the capitalist and socialist systems. Khrushchev's peaceful coexistence was based on practical changes which had occurred; he accused the old "two camp" theory of neglecting the non-aligned movement and the national liberation movements. Khrushchev considered these "grey areas", in which the conflict between capitalism and socialism would be fought. He still stressed that the main contradiction in international relations were those of capitalism and socialism. The Soviet Government under Khrushchev stressed the importance of peaceful coexistence, saying that it had to form the basis of Soviet foreign policy. Failure to do, they believed, would lead to nuclear conflict. Despite this, Soviet theorists still considered peaceful coexistence to be a continuation of the class struggle between the capitalist and socialist worlds, but not based on armed conflict. Khrushchev believed that the conflict, in its current phase, was mainly economic.

The emphasis on peaceful coexistence did not mean that the Soviet Union accepted a static world with clear lines. It continued to uphold the creed that socialism was inevitable and they sincerely believed that the world had reached a stage in which the "correlations of forces" were moving towards socialism. With the establishment of socialist regimes in Eastern Europe and Asia, Soviet foreign policy planners believed that capitalism had lost its dominance as an economic system.

==== Socialism in one country ====
The concept of "Socialism in One Country" was conceived by Stalin in his struggle against Leon Trotsky and his concept of permanent revolution. In 1924, Trotsky published his pamphlet Lessons of October, in which he stated that socialism in the Soviet Union would fail because of the backward state of economic development unless a world revolution began. Stalin responded to Trotsky's pamphlet with his article, "October and Comrade Trotsky's Theory of Permanent Revolution". In it, Stalin stated that he did not believe an inevitable conflict between the working class and the peasants would take place, and that "socialism in one country is completely possible and probable". Stalin held the view common among most Bolsheviks at the time; there was a possibility of real success for socialism in the Soviet Union despite the country's backwardness and international isolation. While Grigoriy Zinoviev, Lev Kamenev and Nikolai Bukharin—together with Stalin—opposed Trotsky's theory of permanent revolution, their views on the way socialism could be built diverged.

According to Bukharin, Zinoviev, and Kamenev supported the resolution of the 14th Conference held in 1925, which stated that "we cannot complete the building of socialism due to our technological backwardness". Despite this cynical attitude, Zinoviev and Kamenev believed that a defective form of socialism could be constructed. At the 14th Conference, Stalin reiterated his position that socialism in one country was feasible despite the capitalist blockade of the Soviet Union. After the conference, Stalin wrote "Concerning the Results of the XIV Conference of the RCP(b)", in which he stated that the peasantry would not turn against the socialist system because they had a self-interest in preserving it. Stalin said the contradictions which arose within the peasantry during the socialist transition could "be overcome by our own efforts". He concluded that the only viable threat to socialism in the Soviet Union was a military intervention.

In late 1925, Stalin received a letter from a party official which stated that his position of "Socialism in One Country" was in contradiction with Friedrich Engels' writings on the subject. Stalin countered that Engels' writings reflected "the era of pre-monopoly capitalism, the pre-imperialist era when there were not yet the conditions of an uneven, abrupt development of the capitalist countries". From 1925, Bukharin began writing extensively on the subject and in 1926, Stalin wrote On Questions of Leninism, which contains his best-known writings on the subject. With the publishing of Leninism, Trotsky began countering Bukharin's and Stalin's arguments, writing that socialism in one country was only possible only in the short term, and said that without a world revolution it would be impossible to safeguard the Soviet Union from the "restoration of bourgeois relations". Zinoviev disagreed with Trotsky and Bukharin, and Stalin; he maintained Lenin's position from 1917 to 1922 and continued to say that only a defective form of socialism could be constructed in the Soviet Union without a world revolution. Bukharin began arguing for the creation of an autarkic economic model, while Trotsky said that the Soviet Union had to participate in the international division of labor to develop. In contrast to Trotsky and Bukharin, in 1938, Stalin said that a world revolution was impossible and that Engels was wrong on the matter. At the 18th Congress, Stalin took the theory to its inevitable conclusion, saying that the communist mode of production could be conceived in one country. He rationalized this by saying that the state could exist in a communist society as long as the Soviet Union was encircled by capitalism. However, with the establishment of socialist regimes in Eastern Europe, Stalin said that socialism in one country was only possible in a large country like the Soviet Union and that to survive, the other states had to follow the Soviet line.

==== Market socialism ====
Between 1985 and 1991, the Communist Party of the Soviet Union (CPSU) underwent a fundamental ideological transformation, shifting from traditional Marxist–Leninist orthodoxy toward models of market socialism and democratic socialism. This evolution was spearheaded by Mikhail Gorbachev, who initiated perestroika (restructuring) and glasnost (openness) as part of an effort to rejuvenate the Soviet system through selective decentralization and democratization. Initially, Gorbachev framed these reforms as a return to the "true" democratic spirit of Leninism, but they increasingly incorporated features associated with Western social democracy, such as private enterprise, market regulation, and political pluralism. As White notes, the period saw "a move away from classical command socialism and towards a system more compatible with market coordination and democratic accountability".

This shift was underpinned by a redefinition of socialism not as a static set of economic relations, but as a flexible, evolving system responsive to contemporary challenges. Gorbachev asserted that socialism must be "deeply democratic" and grounded in civil society rather than bureaucratic inertia. The 1988 Law on Cooperatives legalized small-scale private enterprise, and by the 28th Party Congress in 1990, the CPSU officially recognized political pluralism and supported a mixed economy. This marked a decisive break from centralized economic planning and the monolithic party-state model.

However, these reforms triggered ideological fragmentation and institutional instability. While Gorbachev hoped to salvage socialism through democratization and limited market reform, the dismantling of central controls accelerated the unraveling of the Soviet system. As Brown argues, the CPSU's endorsement of "socialist pluralism" lacked a coherent framework, leading to a crisis of authority and legitimacy. Ultimately, the party's pivot toward democratic socialism and market coordination failed to sustain the Soviet state, which collapsed in December 1991.

== Reasons for demise ==
=== Western view ===
There were few, if any, who believed that the Soviet Union was on the verge of collapse by 1985. The economy was stagnating, but stable enough for the Soviet Union to continue. The political situation was calm because of twenty years of systematic repression against any threat to the country and one-party rule, and the Soviet Union was in its peak of influence in world affairs. The immediate causes for the Soviet Union's dissolution were the policies and thoughts of Mikhail Gorbachev, the CPSU general secretary. His policies of perestroika and glasnost tried to revitalize the Soviet economy and the social and political culture of the country. Throughout his rule, he put more emphasis on democratizing the Soviet Union because he believed it had lost its moral legitimacy to rule. These policies led to the collapse of the communist regimes in Eastern Europe and indirectly destabilized Gorbachev's and the CPSU's control over the Soviet Union. Archie Brown said:

The expectations of, again most notably, Lithuanians, Estonians, and Latvians were enormously enhanced by what they saw happening in the 'outer empire' [Eastern Europe], and they began to believe that they could remove themselves from the 'inner empire'. In truth, a democratized Soviet Union was incompatible with denial of the Baltic states' independence for, to the extent that those Soviet republics became democratic, their opposition to remaining in a political entity whose center was Moscow would become increasingly evident. Yet, it was not preordained that the entire Soviet Union would break up.

However, Brown said that the system did not need to collapse or to do so in the way it did. The democratization from above weakened the party's control over the country and put it on the defensive. Brown added that a different leader than Gorbachev would probably have oppressed the opposition and continued with economic reform. Nonetheless, Gorbachev accepted that the people sought a different road and consented to the Soviet Union's dissolution in 1991. He said that because of its peaceful collapse, the fall of Soviet communism is "one of the great success stories of 20th-century politics". According to Lars T. Lih, the Soviet Union collapsed because people stopped believing in its ideology. He wrote:

When in 1991 the Soviet Union collapsed not with a bang but a whimper, this unexpected outcome was partly the result of the previous disenchantments of the narrative of class leadership. The Soviet Union had always been based on the fervent belief in this narrative in its various permutations. When the binding power of the narrative dissolved, the Soviet Union itself dissolved.

=== According to the Chinese Communist Party ===
The first research into the collapse of the Soviet Union and the Eastern Bloc was very simple and did not take into account several factors. However, these examinations became more advanced by the 1990s, and unlike most Western scholarship, which focuses on the role of Gorbachev and his reform efforts, the Chinese Communist Party (CCP) examined "core (political) life and death issues" so that it could learn from them and not make the same mistakes. Following the CPSU's demise and the Soviet Union's collapse, the CCP's analysis began examining systematic causes. Several leading CCP officials began hailing Khrushchev's rule, saying that he was the first reformer and that if he had continued after 1964, the Soviet Union would not have witnessed the Era of Stagnation begun under Brezhnev and continued under Yuri Andropov and Konstantin Chernenko. The main economic failure was that the political leadership did not pursue any reforms to tackle the economic malaise that had taken hold, dismissing certain techniques as capitalist, and never disentangling the planned economy from socialism. Xu Zhixin from the CASS Institute of Eastern Europe, Russia, and Central Asia, argued that Soviet planners laid too much emphasis on heavy industry, which led to shortages of consumer goods. Unlike his counterparts, Xu argued that the shortages of consumer goods were not an error but "was a consciously planned feature of the system". Other CPSU failures were pursuing the policy of state socialism, the high spending on the military-industrial complex, a low tax base, and the subsidizing of the economy. The CCP argued that when Gorbachev came to power and introduced his economic reforms, they were "too little, too late, and too fast".

In my opinion, the fundamental cause of the drastic changes in the Soviet Union and East European countries at the end of the 1980s and beginning of the 1990s was the loss of dynamism of the Stalin–Soviet Socialist Model ... The demerits of this model were institutional and fundamental—not a single reform after Stalin's death brought fundamental changes to the Stalin–Soviet Socialist Model. This model, with its problems and contradictions accumulating by day, was finally in crisis, and the people of the Soviet Union and Eastern Europe lost their confidence in it. The [only] way out was to abandon the Stalin–Soviet Socialist Model and seek another road for social development.

— Lu Nanqun, a Sovietologist from CASS

While most CCP researchers criticize the CPSU's economic policies, many have criticized what they see as "Soviet totalitarianism". They accuse Joseph Stalin of creating a system of mass terror and intimidation, annulling the democracy component of democratic centralism and emphasizing centralism, which led to the creation of an inner-party dictatorship. Other points were Russian nationalism, a lack of separation between the party and state bureaucracies, suppression of non-Russian ethnicities, distortion of the economy through the introduction of over-centralization and the collectivization of agriculture. According to CCP researcher Xiao Guisen, Stalin's policies led to "stunted economic growth, tight surveillance of society, a lack of democracy in decision-making, an absence of the rule of law, the burden of bureaucracy, the CPSU's alienation from people's concerns, and an accumulation of ethnic tensions". Stalin's effect on ideology was also criticized; several researchers accused his policies of being "leftist", "dogmatist" and a deviation "from true Marxism–Leninism." He is criticized for initiating the "bastardization of Leninism", of deviating from true democratic centralism by establishing a one-man rule and destroying all inner-party consultation, of misinterpreting Lenin's theory of imperialism and of supporting foreign revolutionary movements only when the Soviet Union could get something out of it. Yu Sui, a CCP theoretician, said that "the collapse of the Soviet Union and CPSU is a punishment for its past wrongs!" Similarly, Brezhnev, Mikhail Suslov, Alexei Kosygin and Konstantin Chernenko have been criticized for being "dogmatic, ossified, inflexible, [for having a] bureaucratic ideology and thinking", while Yuri Andropov is depicted by some of having the potential of becoming a new Khrushchev if he had not died early.

While the CCP concur with Gorbachev's assessment that the CPSU needed internal reform, they do not agree on how it was implemented, criticizing his idea of "humanistic and democratic socialism", of negating the leading role of the CPSU, of negating Marxism, of negating the analysis of class contradictions and class struggle, and of negating the "ultimate socialist goal of realizing communism". Unlike the other Soviet leaders, Gorbachev is criticized for pursuing the wrong reformist policies and for being too flexible and too rightist. The CCP Organization Department said, "What Gorbachev in fact did was not to transform the CPSU by correct principles—indeed the Soviet Communist Party needed transformation—but instead he, step-by-step, and ultimately, eroded the ruling party's dominance in ideological, political and organizational aspects".

The CPSU was also criticized for not taking enough care in building the primary party organization and not having inner-party democracy. Others, more radically, concur with Milovan Đilas assessment, saying that a new class was established within the central party leadership of the CPSU and that a "corrupt and privileged class" had developed because of the nomenklatura system. Others criticized the special privileges bestowed on the CPSU elite, the nomenklatura system—which some said had decayed continuously since Stalin's rule—and the relationship between the Soviet military and the CPSU. Unlike in China, the Soviet military was a state institution whereas in China it is a party (and state) institution. The CCP criticizes the CPSU of pursuing Soviet imperialism in its foreign policies.

== Electoral history ==
=== Presidential elections ===
Election	Party candidate	Votes	%	Result
1990	Mikhail Gorbachev	1,329	72.9%	Elected ✓

=== Legislative elections ===
==== All-Union Congress of Soviets ====
Election	Party leader	Result	+/–	Position
1922	Vladimir Lenin	2,082 / 2,215	New	1st
1924	Joseph Stalin	1,974 / 2,124	▼108	1st
1925	Joseph Stalin	1,930 / 2,276	▼46	1st
1927	Joseph Stalin	1,162 / 1,603	▼768	1st
1929	Joseph Stalin	1,196 / 1,656	▲34	1st
1931	Joseph Stalin	1,151 / 1,576	▼11	1st
1935	Joseph Stalin	1,498 / 2,022	▲347	1st
1936	Joseph Stalin	1,448 / 2,025	▼50	1st

==== Supreme Soviet ====
Election	Soviet of the Union					Soviet of Nationalities				Position	
Election	Party leader	Votes	%	Seats	+/–	Votes	%	Seats	+/–	Position	
1937	Joseph Stalin	89,844,271	99.3%	461 / 569		89,063,169	99.4%	409 / 574		1st	1st
1946	Joseph Stalin	100,621,225	99.2%	576 / 682	▲115	100,603,567	99.2%	509 / 657	▲100	1st	1st
1950	Joseph Stalin	110,788,377	99.7%	580 / 678	▲4	110,782,009	99.7%	519 / 638	▲10	1st	1st
1954	Nikita Khrushchev	120,479,249	99.8%	565 / 708	▼15	120,539,860	99.8%	485 / 639	▼34	1st	1st
1958	Nikita Khrushchev	133,214,652	99.6%	563 / 738	▼2	133,431,524	99.7%	485 / 640	Steady	1st	1st
1962	Nikita Khrushchev	139,210,431	99.5%	604 / 791	▲41	139,391,455	99.6%	490 / 750	▲5	1st	1st
1966	Leonid Brezhnev	143,570,976	99.8%	573 / 767	▼31	143,595,678	99.8%	568 / 750	▲78	1st	1st
1970	Leonid Brezhnev	152,771,739	99.7%	562 / 767	▼11	152,843,228	99.8%	534 / 750	▼34	1st	1st
1974	Leonid Brezhnev	161,355,959	99.8%	562 / 767	Steady	161,443,605	99.8%	534 / 750	Steady	1st	1st
1979	Leonid Brezhnev	174,734,459	99.9%	549 / 750	▼13	174,770,398	99.9%	526 / 750	▼8	1st	1st
1984	Konstantin Chernenko	183,897,278	99.94%	551 / 750	▲2	183,892,271	99.95%	521 / 750	▼5	1st	1st

==== Congress of People's Deputies ====
Election	Party leader	Votes	%	Seats	Position
1989	Mikhail Gorbachev			1,958 / 2,250	1st

== See also ==
- Communist Party of the Russian Federation

=== Communist parties within the Warsaw Pact ===
- Bulgarian Communist Party
- Communist Party of Czechoslovakia
- Socialist Unity Party of Germany
- Hungarian Working People's Party
- Hungarian Socialist Workers' Party
- Polish United Workers' Party
- Romanian Communist Party

=== Other ruling communist parties ===
- People's Democratic Party of Afghanistan
- Party of Labour of Albania
- People's Movement for the Liberation of Angola
- People's Revolutionary Party of Benin
- Revolutionary Military Organization
- Kampuchean People's Revolutionary Party
- Communist Party of Kampuchea
- Chinese Communist Party
- Democratic Rally of the Comorian People
- Congolese Party of Labour
- Communist Party of Cuba
- People's Front for Democracy and Justice
- Workers' Party of Ethiopia
- New Jewel Movement
- Workers' Party of Korea
- Lao People's Revolutionary Party
- Malagasy Revolutionary Party
- Mongolian People's Party
- FRELIMO
- Sandinistas
- United Seychelles
- Somali Revolutionary Socialist Party
- Arab Socialist Ba'ath Party - Syria Region
- Communist Party of Vietnam
- Yemeni Socialist Party
- League of Communists of Yugoslavia

== Footnotes ==
=== Bibliography ===
==== Articles and journal entries ====
- McDonough, Terrence (1995). "Lenin, Imperialism, and the Stages of Capitalist Development". Science & Society. Vol. 59, no. 3. Guilford Press. pp. 339–367. JSTOR 40403507.

==== Books ====
- Brown, Archie (1996). The Gorbachev Factor. Oxford University Press. ISBN 0-19-288052-7.
- Brown, Archie (2006). "The Gorbachev Era". In Suny, Ronald Grigor (ed.). The Cambridge History of Russia. Vol. 3. Cambridge University Press. ISBN 0-521-81144-9.
- Eaton, Katherine Bliss (2004). Daily Life in the Soviet Union. Greenwood Publishing Group. ISBN 0-313-31628-7.
- Eisen, Jonathan (1990). The Glasnost Reader. University of Michigan. ISBN 0-453-00695-7.
- Evans, Alfred (1993). Soviet Marxism–Leninism: The Decline of an Ideology. ABC-CLIO. ISBN 0-275-94763-7.
- Fainsod, Merle; Hough, Jerry F. (1979). How the Soviet Union is Governed. Harvard University Press. ISBN 0-674-41030-0.
- Getty, John (1987). Origins of the Great Purges: The Soviet Communist Party Reconsidered, 1933–1938. Cambridge University Press. ISBN 978-0-521-33570-6.
- Gill, Graeme (2002). The Origins of the Stalinist Political System. Cambridge University Press. ISBN 0-674-41030-0.
- Hanson, Stephen (2006). "The Brezhnev Era". In Suny, Ronald Grigor (ed.). The Cambridge History of Russia. Vol. 3. Cambridge University Press. ISBN 0-521-81144-9.
- Harding, Neil (1996). Leninism. Macmillan Publishers. ISBN 0-333-66482-5.
- Harris, Jonathan (2005). Subverting the System: Gorbachev's Reform of the Party's Apparat 1986–1991. Rowman & Littlefield. ISBN 0-7425-2678-X.
- Kenez, Peter (1985). The Birth of the Propaganda State: Soviet Methods of Mass Mobilization, 1917–1929. Cambridge University Press. ISBN 0-521-31398-8.
- Lenoe, Matthew Edward (2004). Closer to the Masses: Stalinist Culture, Social Revolution, and Soviet Newspapers. Harvard University Press. ISBN 0-674-01319-0.
- Lih, Lars T. (2006). "The Soviet Union and the road to communism". In Suny, Ronald Grigor (ed.). The Cambridge History of Russia. Vol. 3. Cambridge University Press. ISBN 0-521-81144-9.
- White, Stephen (1992). "The Soviet Union: Gorbachev, perestroika and socialism". Journal of Communist Studies. 8: 23–40. doi:10.1080/13523279208415127.
- Lowenhardt, John; van Ree, Erik; Ozinga, James (1992). The Rise and Fall of the Soviet Politburo. St Martin's Press. ISBN 0-312-04784-3.
- Matthews, Marvyn (1983). Education in the Soviet Union: Policies and Institutions since Stalin. Routledge. ISBN 0-04-370114-0.
- Motyl, Alexander J. (2001). Encyclopedia of Nationalism, Volume II. Academic Press. ISBN 0-12-227230-7.
- Remington, Thomas (1988). The Truth of Authority: Ideology and Communication in the Soviet Union. University of Pittsburgh Press. ISBN 978-0-8229-3590-2.
- Sakwa, Richard (1990). Soviet politics: an Introduction. Routledge. ISBN 0-415-00506-X.
- Sakwa, Richard (1998). Soviet politics in Perspective. Routledge. ISBN 0-415-07153-4.
- Shambaugh, David (2008). China's Communist Party: Atrophy and Adaptation. University of California Press. ISBN 978-0-520-25492-3.
- Smith, Gordon (1988). Soviet Politics: Continuity and Contradictions. St. Martin's Press. ISBN 0-312-00795-7.
- Smith, Gordon (1991). Soviet Politics: Continuity and Contradictions (2nd ed.). St. Martin's Press. ISBN 0-333-53576-6.
- Suny, Ronald Grigor (2006). "Chronology/Introduction". In Suny, Ronald Grigor (ed.). The Cambridge History of Russia. Vol. 3. Cambridge University Press. ISBN 0-521-81144-9.
- Swain, Geoff (2006). Trotsky. Pearson Education. ISBN 0-582-77190-0.
- White, Steven; Pravda, Alex; Gitelman, Zvi (1990). Developments in Soviet Politics. Palgrave MacMillan. ISBN 978-1-349-20819-7.
- Simons, Williams (1984). The Party Statutes of the Communist World. BRILL Publishers. ISBN 90-247-2975-0.
- Taubman, William (2006). "The Khrushchev Era". In Suny, Ronald Grigor (ed.). The Cambridge History of Russia. Vol. 3. Cambridge University Press. ISBN 0-521-81144-9.
- van Ree, Erik (2003). The Political Thought of Joseph Stalin: A Study in Twentieth Century Revolutionary Patriotism. Routledge. ISBN 978-1-135-78604-5.
- Zimmerman, William (1977). Dallin, Alexander (ed.). The Twenty-fifth Congress of the CPSU: Assessment and Context. Stanford University. Hoover Press. ISBN 0-8179-6843-1.
- Shub, David (1948). Lenin. p. 284.
