= Central Committee of the 28th Congress of the Communist Party of the Soviet Union =

The Central Committee of the 28th Congress of the Communist Party of the Soviet Union (CPSU) was in session from 1990 until the party was banned on 6 November 1991. It elected, at its 1st Plenary Session, the Politburo and the Secretariat (and individual secretaries) of the 28th term.

== Plenums ==
The Central Committee was not a permanent institution. It convened plenary sessions. Four CC plenary sessions and two plenary sessions held in conjunction with the convening of the Central Control Commission were held between the 28th Congress and the party's banning on 6 November 1991. When the CC was not in session, decision-making power was vested in the internal bodies of the CC itself; that is, the Politburo and the Secretariat. None of these bodies were permanent either; typically they convened several times a month.

Plenary sessions of the Central Committee
Plenum	Date	Length
1st Plenary Session	13–14 July 1990	2 days
2nd Plenary Session	8–9 October 1990	2 days
3rd Plenary Session	10–11 December 1990	2 days
1st Joint Plenary Session	31 January 1991	1 day
2nd Joint Plenary Session	24–25 April 1991	2 days
4th Plenary Session	25–26 July 1991	1 day

== Composition ==
Members of the Central Committee of the 28th Congress of the Communist Party of the Soviet Union
Name	Cyrillic	27th CC	Birth	Death	PM	Ethnicity	Gender
Leonid Abalkin	Леонид Абалкин	New	1930	2011	1956	Russian	Male
Mirza Abbasov	Мирза Аббасов	New	1937	Alive	1972	Azerbaijani	Male
Abdulkhakim Abdukarimov	Абдулхаким Абдукаримов	New	1949	Alive	1972	Tajik	Male
Dzhura Abdullayev	Джура Абдуллаев	New	1927	2020	1965	Uzbek	Male
Pulat Abdurakhmanov	Пулат Абдурахманов	New	1940	Alive	1967	Uzbek	Male
Dzhurabay Abdurakhmanov	Джурабай Абдурахманов	New	1941	Alive	1965	Uzbek	Male
Galima Abelguzina	Галима Абельгузина	New	1957	Alive	1982	Bashkir	Female
Obidzhon Abobakirov	Обиджон Абобакиров	New	1952	Alive	1979	Uzbek	Male
Yuri Abramov	Юрий Абрамов	New	1950	Alive	1976	Belarusian	Male
Vladislav Achalov	Владисла́в Ача́лов	New	1945	2011	1965	Russian	Male
Veniamin Afonin	Вениами́н Афо́нин	Old	1931	2017	1957	Russian	Male
Rufat Agayev	Руфат Агаев	New	1945	Alive	1970	Azerbaijani	Male
Askar Akayev	Акаев Аскар	New	1944	Alive	1981	Kazakh	Male
Khosiyat Akhmedova	Хосият Ахмедова	New	1953	Alive	1987	Tajik	Female
Sergey Aleksandrov	Сергей Александров	New	1957	Alive	1982	Russian	Male
Alexander Alexandrov	Александр Александров	New	1948	Alive	1975	Russian	Male
Alirza Alirzayev	Алирза Алирзаев	New	1940	Alive	1978	Azerbaijani	Male
Mukhu Aliyev	Муху́ Али́ев	New	1940	Alive	1966	Avar	Male
Nodari Amaglobeli	Нодари Амаглобели	New	1930	2004	1973	Georgian	Male
Dzhumgalbek Amanbayev	Джумгалбек Аманбаев	By-election	1946	2005	1972	Kyrgyz	Male
Andrey Andriyesh	Андрей Андриеш	New	1933	2012	1965	Moldovan	Male
Aleksandr Anipkin	Александр Анипкин	New	1940	2014	1962	Russian	Male
Viktor Aniskin	Виктор Анискин	New	1948	Alive	1974	Russian	Male
Lembit Annus	Лембит Аннус	New	1941	2018	1963	Estonian	Male
Pavel Anspok	Павел Анспок	New	1942	Alive	1971	Latvian	Male
Vladislav Anufriyev	Владислав Ануфриев	New	1937	Alive	1969	Russian	Male
Lyudmilla Arutyunyan	Людмила Арутюнян	New	1941	Alive	1973	Armenian	Female
Yerik Asanbayev	Ерик Асанбаев	New	1936	2004	1967	Kazakh	Male
Atakul Askarov	Атакул Аскаров	New	1940	Alive	1969	Kyrgyz	Male
Oleg Aslanov	Олег Асланов	New	1945	Alive	1969	Ukrainian	Male
Ruzmet Atadzhanov	Рузмет Атаджанов	New	1945	Alive	1977	Uzbek	Male
Ogulgerek Atayeva	Огульгерек Атаева	New	1949	Alive	1986	Turkmen	Female
Saparbek Aubakirov	Сапарбек Аубакиров	New	1947	Alive	1974	Kazakh	Male
Fayzali Avazov	Файзали Авазов	New	1962	Alive	1985	Tajik	Male
Durdymurat Babakuliyev	Дурдымурат Бабакулиев	New	1955	Alive	1982	Turkmen	Male
Vladimir Babichev	Владимир Бабичев	New	1939	2010	1966	Russian	Male
Varazdat Bagdasaryan	Вараздат Багдасарян	New	1949	Alive	1976	Armenian	Male
Nikolai Bagrov	Николай Багров	New	1937	2015	1962	Ukrainian	Male
Vadim Bakatin	Вадим Бакатин	Old	1937	2022	1964	Russian	Male
Oleg Baklanov	Оле́г Бакла́нов	Old	1932	2021	1953	Russian	Male
Vladimir Bambayev	Владимир Бамбаев	New	1951	Alive	1975	Kalmyk	Male
Aleksey Barchuk	Алексей Барчук	New	1936	2019	1972	Russian	Male
Boris Batalin	Борис Баталин	New	1942	Alive	1963	Russian	Male
Iskandar Baykulov	Искандар Байкулов	New	1955	Alive	1983	Tajik	Male
Zuhra Bayramkulova	Зухра́ Байрамку́лова	New	1940	2013	1960	Russian	Female
Vasily Belov	Васи́лий Бело́в	New	1932	2012	1956	Russian	Male
Khakim Berdyyev	Хаким Бердыев	New	1938	Alive	1962	Uzbek	Male
Anatoly Berezin	Анатолий Берёзин	New	1931	1998	1954	Russian	Male
Alexander Bessmertnykh	Алекса́ндр Бессме́ртных	New	1933	Alive	1963	Russian	Male
Zayna Beyshekeyeva	Зайна Бейшекеева	New	1955	Alive	1976	Kyrgyz	Female
Nail Bikkenin	Наиль Биккенин	New	1931	2007	1955	Tatar	Male
Rouslan Bodelan	Руслан Боделан	New	1942	Alive	1964	Ukrainian	Male
Nikolai Bogdanov	Николай Богданов	New	1944	Alive	1968	Russian	Male
Yuri Bogdanov	Юрий Богданов	New	1940	Alive	1963	Russian	Male
Valery Boldin	Валерий Болдин	Old	1935	2006	1960	Russian	Male
Ivan Boldyrov	Иван Болдырев	New	1937	Alive	1956	Russian	Male
Juozas Bremkauskas	Иозас Бремкаускас	New	1937	Alive	1956	Lithuanian	Male
Georgy Bukharkov	Георгий Бухарков	New	1946	2016	1971	Ukrainian	Male
Alexander Bukhtin	Александр Бухтин	New	1956	Alive	1982	Russian	Male
Pavel Bunich	Павел Бунич	New	1929	2011	1956	Russian	Male
Oktyabr Burdenko	Октябрь Бурденко	New	1925	2010	1944	Ukrainian	Male
Mykolas Burokevičius	Миколас Бурокявичюс	New	1927	2016	1946	Lithuanian	Male
Alexander Buzgalin	Александр Бузгалин	New	1954	2023	1979	Russian	Male
Vasily Chalikov	Василий Чаликов	New	1952	2008	1979	Russian	Male
Aleksey Chausov	Алексей Чаусов	New	1950	Alive	1971	Russian	Male
Nikolai Chepelov	Николай Чепелёв	New	1942	Alive	1968	Russian	Male
Nikolai Chernov	Николай Чернов	New	1949	Alive	1975	Russian	Male
Pyotr Chernykh	Пётр Черных	New	1938	Alive	1964	Russian	Male
Vladimir Chertishchev	Владимир Чертищев	New	1940	Alive	1964	Russian	Male
Valentin Chikin	Валентин Чикин	Candidate	1932	Alive	1956	Russian	Male
Nodari Chitanava	Нодари Читанава	New	1935	Alive	1958	Georgian	Male
Raisa Cholokua	Раиса Чолокуа	New	1942	Alive	1965	Abkhazian	Female
Lyudmila Davletova	Людмила Давлетова	New	1940	Alive	1971	Kyrgyz	Female
Aleksandr Degtyarev	Александр Дегтярев	New	1946	Alive	1970	Russian	Male
Viktor Domin	Виктор Дёмин	New	1946	Alive	1980	Russian	Male
Anatoly Denisov	Анатолий Денисов	New	1934	2010	1975	Russian	Male
Igor Denisov	Игорь Денисов	New	1941	2021	1967	Russian	Male
Fodor Derkach	Фёдор Деркач	New	1940	Alive	1968	Russian	Male
Gennady Deryabin	Геннадий Дерябин	New	1939	Alive	1963	Russian	Male
Alexander Dzasokhov	Александр Дзасохов	New	1934	Alive	1957	Ossetian	Male
Afetdin Dzhalilov	Афетдин Джалилов	New	1946	1994	1972	Azerbaijani	Male
Sergey Dimans	Сергей Диманс	New	1951	Alive	1979	Latvian	Male
Nikolai Dmukha	Николай Дмуха	New	1953	Alive	1974	Russian	Male
Aleksandr Dolgolyuk	Александр Долголюк	New	1945	Alive	1967	Russian	Male
Lyudmilla Dolmatova	Людмила Долматова	New	1953	Alive	1978	Belarusian	Female
Viktor Donskikh	Виктор Донских	New	1935	2022	1960	Russian	Male
Vladimir Doroshenko	Владимир Дорошенко	New	1942	Alive	1964	Ukrainian	Male
Nikolai Doshkov	Николай Дошков	New	1948	Alive	1977	Russian	Male
Vladimir Dyachenko	Владимир Дьяченко	New	1950	Alive	1978	Russian	Male
Ivan Dyakov	Иван Дьяков	New	1937	Alive	1962	Russian	Male
Lyudmila Dyshlevich	Людмила Дышлевич	New	1943	Alive	1984	Even	Female
Valentin Falin	Baлeнтин Фалин	Old	1926	2018	1953	Russian	Male
Anatoly Fedorenko	Анатолий Федоренко	New	1950	Alive	1983	Russian	Male
Alevtina Fedulova	Алевтина Федулова	New	1939	Alive	1968	Russian	Female
Nikolay Fedyanin	Николай Федянин	New	1956	Alive	1981	Russian	Male
Vladimir Fodorov	Владимир Фёдоров	New	1939	2011	1965	Russian	Male
Vitold Fokin	Витольд Фокин	New	1932	Alive	1957	Russian	Male
Ivan Frolov	Иван Фролов	Old	1929	1999	1960	Russian	Male
Ivan Fomin	Иван Фомин	New	1948	Alive	1976	Russian	Male
Valentin Gayvoronsky	Валентин Гайворонский	New	1948	Alive	1973	Russian	Male
Akhsarbek Galazov	Ахсарбек Галазов	New	1929	2013	1959	Ossetian	Male
Alexander Galkin	Александр Галкин	New	1939	Alive	1963	Russian	Male
Lev Galkin	Лев Галкин	New	1941	Alive	1969	Russian	Male
Yuri Garin	Юрий Гарин	New	1945	Alive	1972	Russian	Male
Vitaly Garkusha	Виталий Гаркуша	New	1940	Alive	1969	Ukrainian	Male
Gasan Gasanov	Гасан Гасанов	New	1940	Alive	1963	Azerbaijani	Male
Aleksandr Gelman	Александр Гельман	New	1933	Alive	1956	Russian	Male
Viktor Gerashchenko	Ви́ктор Гера́щенко	New	1937	Alive	1963	Russian	Male
Boris Gidaspov	Бори́с Гида́спов	New	1933	2007	1962	Russian	Male
Andrey Girenko	Андрей Гиренко	Old	1936	2017	1963	Ukrainian	Male
Mikhail Gorbachev	Михаил Горбачёв	Old	1931	2022	1952	Russian	Male
Igor Gorbunov	Игорь Горбунов	New	1941	2022	1971	Russian	Male
Sergey Goryushkin	Сергей Горюшкин	New	1948	Alive	1977	Russian	Male
Yuri Goryachev	Юрий Горячев	New	1938	2010	1960	Russian	Male
Andrei Grachov	Андрей Грачёв	New	1941	Alive	1965	Russian	Male
Alexander Grakhovsky	Александр Граховский	New	1938	1991	1962	Belarusian	Male
Averky Grigoriev	Аверкий Григорьев	New	1942	Alive	1965	Russian	Male
Vladimir Grigoriev	Владимир Григорьев	Old	1941	2011	1960	Belarusian	Male
Anatoly Gromoglasov	Анатолий Громогласов	New	1935	Alive	1961	Russian	Male
Viktor Grushko	Виктор Грушко	New	1930	2001	1960	Russian	Male
Nikolai Gubenko	Николай Губенко	New	1941	2020	1987	Ukrainian	Male
Givi Gumbaridze	Гиви Гумбаридзе	New	1945	Alive	1972	Georgian	Male
Stanislav Gurenko	Станисла́в Гуре́нко	New	1936	2013	1961	Ukrainian	Male
Aleksandr Gusev	Александр Гусев	New	1950	Alive	1983	Russian	Male
Boris Guseletov	Борис Гуселетов	New	1955	Alive	1986	Russian	Male
Ivan Gutsu	Иван Гуцу	New	1943	Alive	1966	Moldovan	Male
Hussein Ibragimov	Гусейн Ибрагимов	New	1951	Alive	1984	Azerbaijani	Male
Nargiza Iluridze	Наргиза Илуридзе	New	1947	Alive	1977	Georgian	Female
Aleksey Ilyin	Алексей Ильин	New	1944	1996	1966	Russian	Male
Alexander Ilyenkov	Александр Ильенков	New	1937	2010	1958	Russian	Male
Nazhameden Iskaliyev	Нажамеден Искалиев	New	1941	Alive	1966	Kazakh	Male
Tofik Ismailov	Тофик Исмаилов	New	1933	1991	1960	Azerbaijani	Male
Stanislav Ivanov	Станислав Иванов	New	1948	Alive	1969	Ukrainian	Male
Vladimir Ivashko	Влади́мир Ива́шко	Old	1932	1994	1960	Ukrainian	Male
Apas Jumagulov	Апас Джумагулов	New	1934	Alive	1962	Kyrgyz	Male
Vladimir Kadochnikov	Владимир Кадочников	New	1943	2015	1971	Russian	Male
Aygul Kadyrbekova	Айгуль Кадырбекова	New	1946	Alive	1972	Kazakh	Female
Karomat Kadyrova	Каромат Кадырова	New	1947	Alive	1978	Uzbek	Female
Khalmamed Kakabayev	Халмамед Какабаев	New	1939	Alive	1983	Turkmen	Male
Vladimir Kalashnikov	Владимир Калашников	Old	1929	2008	1954	Russian	Male
Kabdylda Kaldybayev	Кабдылда Калдыбаев	New	1940	Alive	1963	Kyrgyz	Male
Zarlyk Kaliyev	Зарлык Калиев	New	1937	Alive	1963	Kazakh	Male
Sergei Kalinin	Сергей Калинин	New	1951	1999	1978	Russian	Male
Yelena Kalinina	Елена Калинина	New	1949	Alive	1972	Russian	Female
Yuri Kalita	Юрий Калита	New	1937	Alive	1968	Russian	Male
Zholaman Kalymov	Жоламан Калымов	New	1938	Alive	1970	Kazakh	Male
Aleksey Kamay	Алексей Камай	Candidate	1936	Alive	1960	Belarusian	Male
Fodor Kaputsky	Фёдор Капуцкий	New	1930	2017	1963	Belarusian	Male
Uzakbay Karamanov	Узакбай Караманов	New	1937	2017	1962	Kazakh	Male
Islam Karimov	Ислам Каримов	New	1938	2016	1964	Uzbek	Male
Vladimir I. Karpov	Владимир Карпов	New	1950	Alive	1975	Russian	Male
Vladimir V. Karpov	Владимир Карпов	Old	1922	2010	1943	Russian	Male
Gennady Karunin	Геннадий Карунин	New	1958	Alive	1977	Mordvin	Male
Vyacheslav Kebich	Вячеслав Кебич	New	1936	2020	1962	Belarusian	Male
Tengiz Khakhva	Тенгиз Хахва	New	1952	Alive	1976	Georgian	Male
Grigory Kharchenko	Григорий Харченко	New	1936	Alive	1962	Ukrainian	Male
Shaydulla Khasenov	Шаидула Хасенов	New	1941	1990	1970	Kazakh	Male
Izatullo Khayoyev	Изатулло Хаёев	Candidate	1936	2015	1961	Tajik	Male
Yevgeny Khilchenko	Евгений Хильченко	New	1950	Alive	1971	Russian	Male
Vyacheslav Khimyak	Вячеслав Химяк	New	1949	Alive	1985	Ukrainian	Male
Vladimir Khishba	Владимир Хишба	New	1936	Alive	1963	Abkhazian	Male
Davlat Khudonazarov	Давлатназар Худоназаров	New	1944	Alive	1981	Tajik	Male
Leonid Khitrun	Леонид Хитрун	Candidate	1930	2009	1955	Belarusian	Male
Gennady Khvatov	Геннадий Хватов	New	1934	2020	1958	Russian	Male
Boris Kibirev	Борис Кибирев	New	1937	Alive	1967	Russian	Male
Yevgeny Kirshin	Евгений Киршин	New	1944	Alive	1969	Russian	Male
Nikolai Kiryanov	Николай Кирьянов	New	1940	Alive	1970	Russian	Male
Sergei Kovalev	Сергей Ковалёв	New	1959	Alive	1982	Russian	Male
Valery Kokov	Валерий Коков	New	1941	2005	1966	Kabardian	Male
Natalya Kolesnikova	Наталья Колесникова	New	1962	Alive	1986	Russian	Female
Anatoly Kolinichenko	Анатолий Колиниченко	New	1937	Alive	1966	Russian	Male
Serafim Kolpakov	Серафим Колпаков	Old	1933	2011	1966	Russian	Male
Kalju Komissarov	Калью Комиссаров	New	1946	Alive	1971	Estonian	Male
Valentin Koptyug	Валентин Коптюг	Old	1931	1997	1961	Belarusian	Male
Igor Korniychuk	Игорь Корнийчук	New	1962	Alive	1985	Ukrainian	Male
Allaberdy Kochekov	Аллаберды Кочеков	New	1959	Alive	1988	Turkmen	Male
Yevgeny Krasnitsky	Евгений Красницкий	New	1951	2013	1975	Russian	Male
Leonid Kravchenko	Леонид Кравченко	New	1938	2018	1960	Russian	Male
Leonid Kravchuk	Леонид Кравчук	New	1934	2022	1958	Ukrainian	Male
Vitaly Krivoshchapov	Виталий Кривощапов	New	1949	Alive	1982	Russian	Male
Nikolay Kruchina	Николай Кручина	Old	1928	1991	1949	Russian	Male
Zoya Krylova	Зоя Крылова	New	1944	2017	1973	Russian	Female
Vladimir Kryuchkov	Влади́мир Крючко́в	Old	1924	2007	1944	Russian	Male
Aleksey Kuleshov	Алексей Кулешов	New	1936	2004	1961	Russian	Male
Valery Kulikov	Валерий Куликов	New	1953	Alive	1978	Russian	Male
Valentin Kuptsov	Валентин Купцов	Old	1937	Alive	1944	Russian	Male
Uzakmamed Kurdov	Узакмамед Курдов	New	1949	Alive	1986	Turkmen	Male
Ivan Kurilyak	Иван Куриляк	New	1932	Alive	1971	Ukrainian	Male
Yuri Kuznetsov	Юрий Кузнецов	New	1931	2002	1959	Russian	Male
Otto Latsis	Отто Лацис	New	1934	2005	1959	Latvian	Male
Nikolai Lavorov	Николай Лавёров	New	1930	2016	1959	Russian	Male
Yuri Lavronov	Юрий Лаврёнов	New	1936	Alive	1978	Russian	Male
Gennady Lavrov	Геннадий Лавров	New	1953	Alive	1976	Russian	Male
Vasily Leonov	Василий Леонов	New	1938	2015	1967	Belarusian	Male
Mikhail Leonchenko	Михаил Леонченко	New	1954	Alive	1980	Russian	Male
Anatoly Leontyev	Анатолий Леонтьев	New	1934	2021	1960	Russian	Male
Aleksey Litovchenko	Алексей Литовченко	New	1938	1992	1960	Russian	Male
Yuri Litvintsev	Юрий Литвинцев	Old	1934	2009	1956	Russian	Male
Aleksandr Litvyak	Александр Литвяк	New	1956	Alive	1976	Ukrainian	Male
Eleonora Liepniece	Элеонора Лиепниеце	New	1938	Alive	1960	Latvian	Female
Oleg Lobov	Олег Лобов	New	1937	2018	1971	Russian	Male
Vladimir Lobovsky	Владимир Лобовский	New	1945	Alive	1972	Russian	Male
Natalya Lugovaya	Наталья Луговая	New	1952	Alive	1973	Russian	Female
Vladimir Lukyanenko	Владимир Лукьяненко	Candidate	1937	Alive	1963	Ukrainian	Male
Anatoly Lukyanov	Анатолий Лукьянов	Old	1930	2019	1953	Russian	Male
Leonid Lutitsky	Леонид Лутицкий	New	1942	Alive	1973	Ukrainian	Male
Pyotr Luchinsky	Пётр Лучинский	Old	1940	Alive	1964	Moldovan	Male
Bronislav Lyakh	Бронислав Лях	New	1950	Alive	1974	Ukrainian	Male
Vladimir Lyakishev	Владимир Лякишев	New	1949	Alive	1973	Russian	Male
Boris Makarov	Борис Макаров	New	1947	Alive	1963	Russian	Male
Mikhail Malashenko	Михаил Малашенко	New	1952	Alive	1976	Russian	Male
Anatoly Malofeyev	Анато́лий Малофе́ев	Old	1933	2022	1957	Belarusian	Male
Nikolay Malikov	Николай Мальков	New	1932	2007	1954	Russian	Male
Vladimir Malkovsky	Владимир Мальковский	New	1951	2003	1976	Russian	Male
Alexander Maltsev	Александр Мальцев	New	1952	Alive	1985	Russian	Male
Salidzhan Mamarasulov	Салиджан Мамарасулов	Candidate	1930	2005	1958	Uzbek	Male
Yuri Manayenkov	Юрий Манаенков	New	1936	2021	1960	Russian	Male
Gury Marchuk	Гурий Марчук	Old	1925	2013	1947	Russian	Male
Aleksey Marenkov	Алексей Маренков	New	1944	Alive	1970	Russian	Male
Vladimir Markaryants	Владимир Маркарьянц	New	1934	2000	1958	Armenian	Male
Vladimir Martins	Владимир Мартинс	New	1937	Alive	1973	Russian	Male
Vladlen Martynov	Владлен Мартынов	New	1929	2008	1952	Russian	Male
Absamat Masaliyev	Абсамат Масалиев	Old	1933	2004	1960	Kyrgyz	Male
Yuri Maslyukov	Юрий Маслюков	Old	1937	2010	1966	Russian	Male
Vitaliy Masol	Виталий Масол	Old	1928	2018	1956	Ukrainian	Male
Qahhor Mahkamov	Кахар Махкамов	Old	1932	2016	1957	Tajik	Male
Anatoly Mashkov	Анатолий Машков	New	1946	Alive	1971	Russian	Male
Roy Medvedev	Рой Медве́дев	New	1925	Alive	1959	Russian	Male
Svyatoslav Medvedev	Святослав Медве́дев	New	1941	Alive	1967	Russian	Male
Maksuma Melikova	Максума Меликова	New	1929	Alive	1952	Azerbaijani	Female
Ivan Melnikov	Ива́н Ме́льников	New	1950	Alive	1972	Russian	Male
Pavel Melnikov	Павел Мельников	New	1941	Alive	1979	Russian	Male
Aleksandr Mikhaylov	Александр Михайлов	New	1955	Alive	1981	Russian	Male
Yevgeny Mironov	Евгений Миронов	New	1945	Alive	1967	Russian	Male
Shukrullo Mirsaidov	Шукрулла Мирсаидов	New	1940	2012	1962	Uzbek	Male
Levon Mkrtchyan	Левон Мкртчян	New	1938	Alive	1967	Armenian	Male
Yuri Mkrtumyan	Юрий Мкртумян	New	1939	2005	1965	Armenian	Male
Mikhail Moiseyev	Михаил Моисеев	New	1939	2022	1962	Russian	Male
Nikolai Moiseyev	Николай Моисеев	New	1934	2020	1955	Russian	Male
Adolfas Morkūnas	Адольфас Моркунас	New	1935	Alive	1961	Lithuanian	Male
Pyotr Moskalenko	Пётр Москаленко	New	1946	Alive	1981	Ukrainian	Male
Vladimir Movsisyan	Владимир Мовсисян	New	1933	2014	1961	Armenian	Male
Konstantin Murenin	Константин Муренин	New	1935	2022	1960	Russian	Male
Vladimir Musayev	Владимир Мусаев	New	1950	Alive	1977	Uzbek	Male
Ayaz Mutallibov	Аяз Муталибов	New	1938	2022	1963	Azerbaijani	Male
Vitaly Mukha	Виталий Муха	New	1935	2005	1963	Ukrainian	Male
Anatoly Myalitsa	Анатолий Мялица	New	1940	2021	1962	Ukrainian	Male
Nursultan Nazarbayev	Нурсултан Назарбаев	Old	1940	Alive	1962	Kazakh	Male
Viktor Nazlukhanyan	Виктор Назлуханян	New	1947	Alive	1969	Armenian	Male
Nodari Nakaidze	Нодари Накаидзе	New	1958	Alive	1986	Georgian	Male
Shalva Nanobashvili	Шалва Нанобашвили	New	1947	Alive	1980	Georgian	Male
Oleg Nefodov	Олег Нефёдов	New	1931	2023	1962	Russian	Male
Sabit Negmatullayev	Сабит Негматуллаев	New	1937	Alive	1966	Tajik	Male
Arkady Nekhayevsky	Аркадий Нехаевский	New	1934	Alive	1959	Ukrainian	Male
Mikahil Nenashev	Михаи́л Нена́шев	Old	1929	2019	1952	Russian	Male
Viktor Netryvaylo	Виктор Нетрывайло	New	1947	Alive	1977	Ukrainian	Male
Leonard Nikiforov	Леонард Никифоров	New	1934	2001	1969	Russian	Male
Konstantin Nikolayev	Константин Николаев	New	1943	Alive	1973	Russian	Male
Saparmurat Niyazov	Сапармурат Ниязов	Old	1940	2006	1962	Turkmen	Male
Genrikh Novozhilov	Ге́нрих Новожи́лов	Old	1925	2019	1951	Russian	Male
Borys Oleynik	Борис Олейник	New	1935	2017	1961	Ukrainian	Male
Yuri Oleksenko	Юрий Олексенко	New	1944	Alive	1967	Ukrainian	Male
Anatoly Onishchenko	Анатолий Онищенко	New	1937	Alive	1965	Ukrainian	Male
Ezhe Orazmukhamedova	Эже Оразмухамедова	New	1949	Alive	1986	Turkmen	Female
Nikolai Orgakov	Николай Огарков	Comeback	1917	1994	1945	Russian	Male
Stanislav Osminin	Станислав Осминин	New	1934	Alive	1955	Russian	Male
Yuri Pakhomov	Юрий Пахомов	New	1928	2014	1953	Russian	Male
Vasily Panin	Василий Панин	New	1934	Alive	1958	Russian	Male
Yemelyan Parubok	Емельян Парубок	Old	1940	2017	1966	Ukrainian	Male
Borys Paton	Бори́с Пато́н	Old	1918	2020	1952	Ukrainian	Male
Valentin Pavlov	Валéнтин Па́влов	New	1937	2003	1962	Russian	Male
Alexander Pavshentsev	Александр Павшенцев	New	1944	Alive	1971	Russian	Male
Vitaly Perov	Виталий Перов	New	1951	Alive	1977	Russian	Male
Yuri Peskov	Юрий Песков	New	1936	2020	1961	Russian	Male
Zaripbay Pirnazarov	Зарипбай Пирназаров	New	1940	Alive	1964	Karakalpak	Male
Vladimir Platonov	Владимир Платонов	New	1929	Alive	1971	Belarusian	Male
Yuri Platonov	Юрий Платонов	New	1929	2016	1960	Russian	Male
Alexander Plekhanov	Александр Плеханов	Old	1932	2015	1960	Russian	Male
Vladimir Plyutinsky	Владимир Плютинский	New	1927	2009	1951	Russian	Male
Yevgeny Podolsky	Евгений Подольский	Candidate	1935	2011	1959	Russian	Male
Stepan Pogosyan	Степан Погосян	New	1932	2012	1956	Armenian	Male
Ivan Polozkov	Иван Полозков	Old	1935	Alive	1958	Russian	Male
Viktor Polyanichko	Виктор Поляничко	New	1937	1993	1959	Russian	Male
Aleksandr Pomorov	Александр Поморов	New	1931	2006	1954	Russian	Male
Alexey Ponomarev	Алексей Пономарёв	Old	1930	2002	1957	Russian	Male
Grigory Posibeyev	Григорий Посибеев	Candidate	1935	2002	1959	Mari	Male
Ivan Postolnikov	Иван Постольников	New	1949	Alive	1970	Russian	Male
Leonid Potapov	Леони́д Пота́пов	New	1935	2020	1964	Russian	Male
Aleksey Prigarin	Алексей Пригарин	New	1930	Alive	1956	Russian	Male
Yuri Prokofyev	Юрий Прокофьев	New	1939	Alive	1960	Russian	Male
Aleksandr Proskurin	Александр Проскурин	New	1957	Alive	1983	Russian	Male
Viktor Prudnikov	Виктор Прудников	New	1939	2015	1960	Russian	Male
Ristam Pulodov	Ристам Пулодов	New	1931	Alive	1968	Tajik	Male
Tadeush Pupkevich	Тадеуш Пупкевич	New	1937	Alive	1969	Belarusian	Male
Aleksandr Raylyan	Александр Райлян	New	1954	Alive	1976	Moldovan	Male
Mitrofan Romanenko	Митрофан Романенко	New	1931	Alive	1962	Russian	Male
Alfrēds Rubiks	Альфред Рубикс	New	1935	Alive	1958	Latvian	Male
Yuri Ruzakov	Юрий Русаков	New	1936	Alive	1960	Russian	Male
Ruyidtin Ruzyyev	Руйитдин Рузыев	New	1941	Alive	1988	Uzbek	Male
Viktor Ryabov	Виктор Рябов	New	1937	Alive	1962	Russian	Male
Vladimir Rymashevsky	Владимир Рымашевский	New	1938	Alive	1960	Belarusian	Male
Nikolai Ryzhkov	Николай Рыжков	Old	1929	2024	1956	Russian	Male
Tamilla Rzayeva	Тамилла Рзаева	New	1951	Alive	1978	Azerbaijani	Female
Galina Sachko	Анна Сахарова	New	1950	Alive	1979	Russian	Female
Anna Sakharova	Анна Сахарова	New	1948	Alive	1976	Russian	Female
Tahir Salahov	Таир Салахов	New	1933	2021	1964	Azerbaijani	Male
Makhmud Salakhitdinov	Махмуд Салахитдинов	New	1933	2018	1962	Uzbek	Male
Turgunbay Salimov	Тургунбай Салимов	New	1947	Alive	1976	Kazakh	Male
Andrei Sangheli	Андрей Сангели	New	1944	Alive	1967	Moldovan	Male
Nikolai Sapozhnikov	Андрей Сангели	New	1949	Alive	1969	Russian	Male
Tadzhat Sargsyan	Таджат Саргсян	New	1941	Alive	1966	Armenian	Male
Valentina Savchenko	Валентина Савченко	New	1947	Alive	1980	Russian	Female
Raisa Savina	Раиса Савина	New	1948	Alive	1980	Ukrainian	Female
Vyacheslav Sekretaryuk	Вячеслав Секретарюк	New	1938	2004	1961	Ukrainian	Male
Gennadiy Seleznyov	Геннадий Селезнёв	New	1947	2015	1970	Russian	Male
Vladimir Ma. Semyonov	Владимир Ма. Семёнов	New	1940	Alive	1970	Karachay	Male
Vladimir Mi. Semyonov	Владимир Ми. Семёнов	New	1936	Alive	1963	Russian	Male
Yuri Semonov	Юрий Семёнов	New	1935	Alive	1964	Russian	Male
Galina Semenova	Галина Семёнова	New	1937	2016	1965	Russian	Female
Aleksey Sergeyev	Алексей Сергеев	New	1930	Alive	1953	Russian	Male
Stefaniya Serzhantovich	Стефания Сержантович	New	1942	Alive	1967	Polish	Female
Ivan Shabanov	Иван Шабанов	New	1939	Alive	1966	Russian	Male
Mintimer Shaimiev	Минтиме́р Шайми́ев	New	1937	Alive	1963	Tatar	Male
Aleksandr Shakhnovsky	Александр Шахновский	New	1956	Alive	1980	Ukrainian	Male
Yevgeny Shaposhnikov	Евгений Шапошников	New	1942	2020	1963	Russian	Male
Pavel Sharin	Павел Шарин	New	1955	Alive	1980	Yakut	Male
Stanislav Shatalin	Станислав Шаталин	New	1934	1997	1963	Russian	Male
Yuri Shatalin	Юрий Шаталин	New	1934	2000	1958	Russian	Male
Seilbek Shaukhamanov	Сеилбек Шаухаманов	New	1939	Alive	1965	Kazakh	Male
Roziya Shayeva	Розия Шаева	New	1952	Alive	1971	Uzbek	Female
Aliy Shazzo	Алий Шаззо	New	1951	Alive	1980	Adyghes	Male
Vladimir Shcherbakov	Владимир Щербаков	New	1949	Alive	1970	Russian	Male
Oleg Shenin	Олег Шенин	New	1937	2009	1962	Russian	Male
Eduard Shevardnadze	Эдуард Шеварднадзе	Old	1928	2014	1936	Georgian	Male
Grigory Shirshin	Григорий Ширшин	Candidate	1934	Alive	1958	Tuvan	Male
Nikolay Shlyaga	Николай Шляга	New	1935	2004	1959	Belarusian	Male
Leonid Shukaylov	Леонид Шукайлов	New	1937	Alive	1962	Belarusian	Male
Vladimir Shumakov	Владимир Шумаков	New	1938	Alive	1984	Russian	Male
Vladislav Shved	Владислав Швед	New	1944	Alive	1970	Russian	Male
Lyudmila Shvetsova	Людмила Шевцова	New	1949	2014	1974	Russian	Female
Vitaly Sigedin	Виталий Сигедин	New	1937	Alive	1962	Russian	Male
Ivan Silayev	Ива́н Сила́ев	Old	1930	2023	1959	Russian	Male
Enn-Arno Sillari	Энн-Арно Силлари	New	1944	Alive	1972	Estonian	Male
Stepan Sitaryan	Степан Ситарян	New	1930	2009	1960	Armenian	Male
Nikolay Skripnikov	Николай Скрипников	New	1936	Alive	1958	Ukrainian	Male
Gennady Smirnov	Геннадий Смирнов	New	1953	Alive	1980	Russian	Male
Andrey Snigach	Андрей Снигач	New	1948	Alive	1973	Ukrainian	Male
Aleksandr N. Sokolov	Александр Н. Соколов	New	1950	Alive	1971	Russian	Male
Aleksandr S. Sokolov	Александр С. Соколов	New	1947	Alive	1972	Russian	Male
Aleksandr S. Sokolov	Александр С. Соколов	New	1947	Alive	1972	Russian	Male
Yefrem Sokolov	Ефре́м Соколо́в	Old	1926	2022	1955	Belarusian	Male
Muratberdy Sopyyev	Муратберды Сопыев	New	1930	2016	1951	Turkmen	Male
Vasily Starodubtsev	Василий Стародубцев	New	1931	2011	1960	Russian	Male
Vasily Stekhov	Василий Стехов	New	1947	Alive	1972	Russian	Male
Nikolay Stolyarov	Николай Столяров	New	1947	Alive	1968	Belarusian	Male
Anatoly Storozhuk	Анатолий Сторожук	New	1944	Alive	1972	Ukrainian	Male
Georgy Strizhak	Георгий Стрижак	New	1946	Alive	1967	Ukrainian	Male
Igor Stroganov	Игорь Строганов	New	1943	1991	1974	Russian	Male
Yegor Stroyev	Его́р Стро́ев	Old	1937	Alive	1958	Russian	Male
Valery Sudarenkov	Вале́рий Сударенков	New	1940	Alive	1963	Russian	Male
Sergey Sukhov	Сергей Сухов	New	1946	Alive	1973	Russian	Male
Umirzak Sultangazin	Умирзак Султангазин	New	1936	2005	1968	Kazakh	Male
Mikhail Surkov	Михаил Сурков	New	1945	Alive	1968	Russian	Male
Aleksandr Tatarkin	Александр Татаркин	New	1946	Alive	1972	Russian	Male
Vasily Tatsy	Василий Таций	New	1940	Alive	1960	Ukrainian	Male
Aleksandr Teplenichev	Александр Тепленичев	New	1937	Alive	1964	Russian	Male
Sergey Tereshchenko	Сергей Терещенко	New	1951	2023	1975	Russian	Male
Vasily Tishchenko	Василий Тищенко	New	1944	Alive	1971	Ukrainian	Male
Steponas Toliautas	Стяпонас Толяутас	New	1958	Alive	1986	Lithuanian	Male
Valnin Tskhovrebashvili	Валнин Цховребашвили	New	1933	Alive	1952	Georgian	Male
Vladimir Tsoy	Владимир Цой	New	1935	Alive	1964	Korean	Male
Gulchekhra Turgunova	Гулчехра Тургунова	New	1944	Alive	1965	Uzbek	Female
Khalizhan Turlubayev	Халижан Турлубаев	New	1955	Alive	1979	Kazakh	Male
Ilyash Tusupov	Иляш Тусупов	New	1949	Alive	1974	Kazakh	Male
Mikhail Ulyanov	Михаил Ульянов	New	1927	2007	1951	Russian	Male
Vladimir Vashurin	Серафим Колпаков	New	1950	Alive	1983	Russian	Male
Pyotr Vasiloy	Александр Бузгалин	New	1949	Alive	1977	Moldovan	Male
Vladimir Vilchinsky	Владимир Вильчинский	New	1931	2021	1955	Ukrainian	Male
Alexander Vishnevetsky	Александр Вишневецкий	New	1950	Alive	1975	Ukrainian	Male
Aleksandr Vlasov	Александр Власов	Old	1932	2002	1956	Russian	Male
Pavel Volkov	Павел Волков	New	1956	Alive	1983	Russian	Male
Nikolai Volodin	Николай Володин	New	1936	2017	1959	Russian	Male
Sergei Voloshin	Сергей Волошин	New	1948	Alive	1972	Ukrainian	Male
Arkady Volodin	Аркадий Володин	Old	1932	2006	1958	Russian	Male
Tamara Vorobyeva	Тамара Воробьева	New	1941	Alive	1985	Russian	Female
Alexander Vorontsov	Александр Воронцов	New	1958	Alive	1980	Russian	Male
Valentin Voshchenko	Валентин Вощенко	New	1945	Alive	1971	Ukrainian	Male
Vladimir Vylegzhanin	Владимир Вылегжанин	New	1954	Alive	1982	Russian	Male
Lev Vysotsky	Лев Высоцкий	New	1931	Alive	1970	Russian	Male
Damir Yadgarov	Дамир Ядгаров	New	1937	Alive	1960	Uzbek	Male
Gennady Yagodin	Геннадий Ягодин	Old	1927	2015	1948	Russian	Male
Sergey Yakovlev	Сергей Яковлев	New	1950	Alive	1977	Russian	Male
Veniamin Yakovlev	Вениамин Яковлев	New	1932	2018	1956	Russian	Male
Gennady Yanayev	Геннадий Янаев	New	1937	2010	1962	Russian	Male
Yevgeny Yarkin	Евгений Яркин	New	1951	Alive	1975	Russian	Male
Yuri Yaromenko	Юрий Ярёменко	New	1935	1996	1976	Russian	Male
Dmitry Yazov	Дми́трий Я́зов	Old	1924	2020	1944	Russian	Male
Anatoly Yefimov	Анатолий Ефимов	Candidate	1939	Alive	1966	Russian	Male
Nikolay Yefimov	Николай Ефимов	New	1932	2022	1962	Russian	Male
Grigore Yeremei	Григорий Еремей	New	1935	Alive	1957	Moldovan	Male
Aleksandr Yevteyev	Александр Евтеев	New	1947	Alive	1969	Russian	Male
Vladimir Yezhov	Владимир Ежов	New	1950	Alive	1974	Russian	Male
Yelizaveta Zadorina	Елизавета Задорина	New	1945	Alive	1971	Russian	Female
Nikolai Zadoya	Николай Задоя	New	1938	Alive	1961	Ukrainian	Male
Sergey Zakharov	Сергей Захаров	New	1954	Alive	1976	Ukrainian	Male
Vasily Zaplitny	Василий Заплитный	New	1938	Alive	1962	Ukrainian	Male
Doku Zavgayev	Доку Завгаев	New	1940	Alive	1966	Chechen	Male
Anatoly Zelenovsky	Анатолий Зеленовский	New	1940	Alive	1966	Belarusian	Male
Vladimir Zemtsov	Владимир Земцов	New	1951	Alive	1978	Russian	Male
Pyotr Zhiganov	Пётр Жиганов	New	1945	Alive	1970	Russian	Male
Vitaly Zhurkin	Виталий Журкин	New	1928	Alive	1952	Russian	Male
Boris Zubkov	Борис Зубков	New	1937	2007	1963	Russian	Male
Vladimir Zyukin	Владимир Зюкин	New	1954	Alive	1977	Russian	Male
