= Valentin Varennikov =

Russian army general and politician (1923-2009)

- Валентин Иванович Варенников
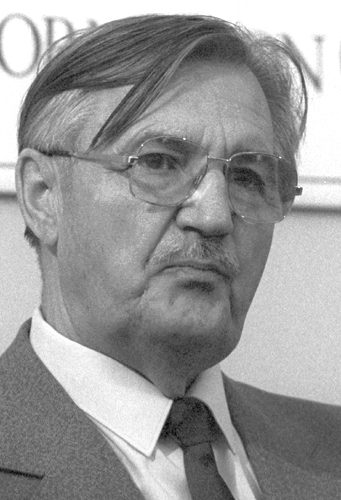
- Varennikov in 1994
- Born: December 15, 1923; Krasnodar, Russian SFSR, Soviet Union
- Died: May 6, 2009 (aged 85); Moscow, Russia
- Military career
- Allegiance: Soviet Union
- Branch: Soviet Army
- Service years: 1941–1991
- Rank: Army general
- Commands: 131st Motorized Rifle Division; 54th Motorized Rifle Division; 26th Army Corps; 3rd Shock Army; Carpathian Military District; Deputy Minister of Defence of the USSR
- Conflicts: World War II; Soviet–Afghan War; Angolan Civil War; South African Border War; Military advisor to Syria and Ethiopia
- Awards: Hero of the Soviet Union; Order of Lenin; Order of Military Merit (Russia); Order of the October Revolution; Order of the Red Banner (4x); Order of the Patriotic War, (1st, 2nd and 3rd class); Order of the Red Star; Order for Service to the Homeland in the Armed Forces of the USSR
- Other work: member of the Russian parliament

Valentin Ivanovich Varennikov (Russian: Валентин Иванович Варенников, December 15, 1923 – May 6, 2009) was a Soviet army general and Russian politician. A veteran of the Second World War, he led the honor guard that received the Victory Banner at the 1945 Moscow Victory Parade, and he later directed Soviet military operations in Afghanistan and became commander-in-chief of the Soviet Ground Forces in 1989. He was one of the most active supporters of the August 1991 coup attempt against Mikhail Gorbachev, and he was the only defendant in the case to refuse an amnesty and insist on a trial, at which he was acquitted in 1994. He later served two terms in the State Duma.

== Early life ==
Varennikov was born on December 15, 1923, in Krasnodar, into a hereditary Cossack family. As a young man, he dreamed of becoming a shipbuilder.

== Military career ==
=== World War II ===
In the summer of 1941, at the age of 17, Varennikov joined the Red Army. After an accelerated course at the Cherkassk Military Infantry School, he was sent to the front in 1942. He fought in the Battle of Stalingrad, and he later served with the Southwestern, 3rd Ukrainian and 1st Belorussian fronts. As a senior lieutenant commanding a battery of the 100th Guards Rifle Regiment of the 35th Guards Rifle Division, part of Vasily Chuikov's 8th Guards Army, he was decorated for organizing effective fire support for the infantry against a heavy German attack in the fighting on the Dnieper in 1943.

Varennikov fought his way across Eastern Europe, and in 1945, as a captain and deputy chief of artillery of his regiment, he took part in the Berlin offensive. He was wounded three times during the war, and he received four combat orders. At the Moscow Victory Parade of 1945, he led the honor guard that first received the Victory Banner brought to Moscow from Berlin.

=== Post-war career ===
After the war, Varennikov served with the Soviet occupation forces in Germany. In 1954, he graduated with a gold medal from the Frunze Military Academy, and in 1967 he graduated, again with a gold medal, from the Voroshilov General Staff Academy. He went on to command a motor rifle division and then an army. In 1970, he was posted to the Group of Soviet Forces in Germany, and in May 1971 he became its deputy commander-in-chief. He was promoted to colonel general in 1972.

From 1973 to 1979, Varennikov commanded the Carpathian Military District, and in 1978 he was promoted to army general. In October 1979, he moved to the General Staff as a deputy chief and head of a main directorate, and he served as a first deputy chief of the General Staff until 1989. In 1986, he became a candidate member of the Central Committee of the Communist Party of the Soviet Union.

Varennikov also represented the Soviet armed forces on military missions to Syria, Angola and Ethiopia. In Angola, then in the midst of a civil war, he supported allowing Soviet military advisers to fight alongside their Angolan allies if they came under attack, in contrast to the official policy of restricting them to non-combat roles. He was the senior Soviet general in Angola during the South African Operation Askari, and he personally advised President José Eduardo dos Santos on defensive measures against the South African Defence Force's incursion. In 1986, he was the chief organizer of the army units sent to deal with the aftermath of the Chernobyl disaster.

=== Afghanistan ===
From the mid-1980s until the Soviet withdrawal in 1989, Varennikov headed the Defense Ministry's operational group in Afghanistan, which ran the Soviet military effort in the Soviet–Afghan War. He directed the withdrawal of Soviet forces in 1988 and 1989. Boris Gromov, the last commander of the 40th Army, later wrote that Varennikov's main task in Afghanistan had been to preserve the lives of Soviet soldiers and officers. On March 3, 1988, he was made a Hero of the Soviet Union.

Varennikov said that the political leadership bore responsibility for the decision to intervene, and that the General Staff had opposed large-scale combat operations, adding: "It is now clear that the line proposed by the General Staff at that time was correct in principle." He blamed the Afghan leader Babrak Karmal for "incompetence and inertia". He continued to defend the war after the Soviet withdrawal.

On February 15, 1989, Varennikov was named commander-in-chief of the Soviet Ground Forces and a deputy minister of defense. He was also elected to the Congress of People's Deputies.

== 1991 coup attempt ==
On January 13, 1991, Varennikov arrived in Vilnius after the Soviet military operation there during the January Events, according to a chronology published by the National Library of Lithuania.

During the August 1991 coup attempt, Varennikov was one of the most active and convinced supporters of the State Committee on the State of Emergency. On August 18, on the proposal of Defense Minister Dmitry Yazov, he flew to Gorbachev's holiday residence at Foros in Crimea with Oleg Baklanov, Valery Boldin, Oleg Shenin and Yuri Plekhanov. According to Gorbachev's adviser Anatoly Chernyaev, Varennikov was the most active member of the group and did most of the talking. The delegation presented Gorbachev with the choice of transferring his powers to Vice President Gennady Yanayev or resigning, and Varennikov told him that the police and, if necessary, the army would maintain order. According to the indictment, published by Novaya Gazeta in 2015, he then ordered the guarding of the Belbek airfield to prevent Gorbachev's release.

On August 19, Varennikov met Leonid Kravchuk, the chairman of the Ukrainian Supreme Soviet, in Kyiv. Kravchuk later said that Varennikov warned him that any civil disobedience would lead to a state of emergency, and told him: "The army has its orders and will act." During the day, Varennikov sent Yazov five ciphered telegrams from Kyiv demanding the most decisive measures, above all against the leadership of Russia. After returning to Moscow on Yazov's orders, he gave instructions to prepare three tank companies for the planned assault on the White House.

After the coup failed, Varennikov was arrested on August 23, 1991, charged with treason and held in the Matrosskaya Tishina prison. In 1994, when the other accused accepted an amnesty passed by the State Duma, he refused it and demanded a trial. At the opening of the trial in June 1994, he asked the court to bring criminal proceedings against Gorbachev, and declared: "My ideas, principles and convictions have remained unshakable." On August 11, 1994, the military collegium of the Supreme Court of Russia acquitted him. The court ruled that he had followed the orders of Yazov, and that he had acted "only in an interest of preserving and strengthening his country". After the verdict, he said that there had been no coup in 1991: "That is not a coup. That is defense of the country."

== Political career ==
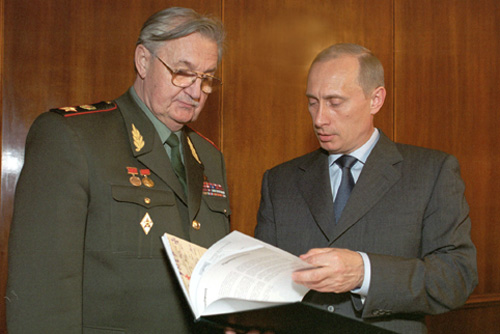
Varennikov with Vladimir Putin, April 11, 2002

In 1995, Varennikov was elected to the State Duma as a member of the Communist Party of the Russian Federation, and he chaired the Duma's committee on veterans' affairs. In 2003, he was elected to the Duma a second time, as one of the best-known figures of the Rodina bloc. He was later appointed an inspector general of the Russian Ministry of Defense. From 2005, he headed the International League for the Protection of Human Dignity and Security.

Varennikov's seven-volume memoirs, The Unrepeatable (Неповторимое), were published in 2001. He was an outspoken defender of Joseph Stalin, and the commentator Leonid Radzikhovsky described him as a convinced Stalinist who never hid his views. In 2008, he presented the case for Stalin as Russia's greatest historical figure on the television project Name of Russia, in which Stalin came third. He argued: "We became a great country because we were led by Stalin."

== Death ==
Varennikov died on May 6, 2009, at the Burdenko Main Military Clinical Hospital in Moscow, where he had been recovering from a complex operation in January 2009. President Dmitry Medvedev sent condolences to his family.

== Honours and awards ==
- Soviet Union
  - Hero of the Soviet Union (March 3, 1988)
  - Order of Lenin, twice
  - Order of the October Revolution
  - Order of the Red Banner, four times
  - Order of Kutuzov, 1st class
  - Order of the Patriotic War, 1st class
  - Order of the Patriotic War, 2nd class, twice
  - Order of the Red Star
  - Order for Service to the Homeland in the Armed Forces of the USSR, 3rd class
  - Medal "For Battle Merit"
  - Medal "For the Defence of Stalingrad"
  - Medal "For the Liberation of Warsaw"
  - Medal "For the Capture of Berlin"
  - Medal "For the Victory over Germany in the Great Patriotic War 1941–1945"
- Russia
  - Order of Military Merit
  - Medal of Zhukov
  - Medal "In Commemoration of the 850th Anniversary of Moscow"
- Afghanistan
  - Order of the Red Banner
  - Order of the Saur Revolution
- People's Republic of Bulgaria
  - Order of the People's Republic of Bulgaria, 1st class, twice
- East Germany
  - Patriotic Order of Merit, silver
- North Korea
  - Order of the National Flag, 2nd class
- Polish People's Republic
  - Order of Polonia Restituta, 2nd class
