= Aleksandra Biryukova =

Soviet politician (1929–2008)

- Александра Бирюкова
- Biryukova in 1989

Deputy Chair of the Council of Ministers
- In office 1 October 1988 – 17 September 1990
- Premier: Nikolay Ryzhkov

Personal details
- Born: 25 February 1929 Russkaya Zhuravka, Voronezh Oblast, Soviet Union
- Died: 20 February 2008 (aged 87) Moscow, Russia
- Party: Communist Party of the Soviet Union
- Profession: Civil servant

Aleksandra Pavlovna Biryukova (née Achkasova; Russian: Алекса́ндра Па́вловна Бирюко́ва; 25 February 1929 – 20 February 2008) was a Soviet politician and member of the Communist Party of the Soviet Union (CPSU). She was the highest-ranking female politician under Soviet leader Mikhail Gorbachev until the election of Galina Semenova in 1990.

Biryukova was the third woman ever appointed to the CPSU Politburo (27th term), the executive committee for the Communist Party of the Soviet Union, and the fifth woman to be appointed to the CPSU Secretariat (27th term). The first woman to serve in the Politburo was Elena Stasova and the second one was Yekaterina Furtseva. Biryukova worked with the Bureau for Social Development, specifically focused on labor conditions, consumer issues, housing, and health.

== Early life ==
Biryukova was born in Voronezh Oblast, Russia on February 25, 1929. She was the middle child of five. Throughout her education, she was extremely ambitious and scored top grades. She graduated with distinction from the Moscow State Textile Institute in 1952. After graduating, Biryukova worked in a Moscow textile factory called The First Printed Fabric Works. She began as a specialist and rose to the position of deputy supervisor and later shop supervisor.

== Political career ==
Biryukova joined the Communist Party of the Soviet Union (CPSU) as a full member in 1956. Administrators for Nikita Khrushchev (Chairman of the Council of Ministers) took attention to her in 1959, and she was appointed to one of Moscow's administrative committees on the economy, and put in charge of Moscow's textile and knitwear industries. She became successful within this movement and created a strong rapport with the workers by campaigning for improved safety and working conditions.

In the 1960s and 1970s, she campaigned to establish holiday homes for trade union members and families, as well as to improve health and safety provisions.

Biryukova was made secretary and Presidium member of the All-Union Central Council of Trade Unions in 1968.

In 1971, she would become a candidate member of the Central Committee of the CPSU and would go on to become a full member in 1976.

On March 6, 1973, Biryukova was appointed the Secretary of the Consumer Goods Industry, responsible for supervising the consumer goods industry (which included the food and light industries).

When Mikhail Gorbachev came into power in 1985, Biryukova entered the highest level of soviet politics by becoming Deputy Chair of the All-Union Central Council of Trade Unions. In 1986, Gorbachev selected Biryukova at the 27th Congress of the Communist Party as a lead on what would become perestroika. She became the first woman elected to the Secretariat of the CPSU in over 20 years, and was responsible for the light industry and production of consumer goods. She was also made a deputy to the USSR Supreme Soviet and the RSFSR Supreme Soviet.

In October 1988, she was elected as a candidate member of the Politburo. In the same month, she was made the Deputy Prime Minister of the USSR and chair of the Bureau for Social Development. The bureau was tasked with providing Soviets with improved food, clothes and many other crucial consumer goods. As chair, Biryukova was required to do a large amount of international shopping. She took a major trip in which she went to eight different cities and purchased 50 million pairs of tights, 1.7 million pairs of lady's shoes and mass quantities of necessities like toothpaste, soap, razor blades, and instant coffee. All of this international shopping was due to product shortages in the Soviet Union and was intended to help reduce labour strikes and workforce unrest.

In 1989, she was the only woman out of the more than 200 highest-ranking members of the Soviet political sphere.

=== The 28th Congress of the Communist Party of the Soviet Union ===
Aleksandra Biryukova attended the congress held on July 5, 1990. At the conference, Biryukova called the Soviet consumer market “a crisis situation” and described the status of health services as “criminal”. At this time, the Communist Party was experiencing an unfavourable period. At the Congress, Biryukova was criticized by many attendees, some of whom also called her to resign. In response to these criticisms, Gorbachev told the group that she would receive a pension and be relieved of all her duties. As a result, Biryukova resigned from all her positions in September 1990, at the age of 61.

== Political views ==
As Biryukova was a supporter of Soviet Communism, she was anti-capitalist and was also an advocate for women. She viewed the lack of representation of women in high-ranking roles as a result of their natural inclination to be a mother. She spoke out about the lack of contraceptives and access to abortion in the Soviet Union in 1989.

== Personal life ==
Biryukova's father and one brother died in World War II. She married Alexander Nikitovich Biryukov (Russian: Александр Никитович Бирюков; 8 September 1925 - 17 September 2006) a staff military officer who retired in 1980. They had a daughter who died at the age of sixteen, due to natural causes.

In 1973, Biryukova published a book called “The Working Woman in the USSR”. The book discusses women and their contribution to the creation of the Soviet socialist state. In her free time, Biryukova enjoyed skiing, swimming, and opera.

== See also ==
- Women in Russia
- Women in government
- Communism
- Dissolution of the Soviet Union

== Bibliography ==
- Cartledge, Sir Bryan, Stephen Dalziel, David Dyker, Ian Gorvin, Angus McQueen, Tim Whewell, Helen Womack, and Martin Wright. Soviet Union: The challenge of change.Edited by Martin Wright. Essex: Longman Group UK Limited, 1989.
- Dejevsky. Mary. “Out shopping for a new Soviet future.” The Times, July 31, 1989.
- Gravestone of Aleksandra Pavlovna Biryukova and Alexander Nikitovich Biryukov. Digital Image. Moscow-Tombs.ru. Accessed March 2, 2020.
- Greenspan, Karen. The timetables of women's history: a chronology of the most important people and events in women's history. New York: Simon & Schuster, 1994.
- Keller, Bill. “A Soviet Woman’s Point of View.” The New York Times, January 24, 1989.
- McCauler, Martin. Who’s Who in Russia since 1990. London: Routledge, 1997.
- Remnick, David. “Soviet Woman Official Speaks Out on Abortion, Women’s Role.” The Washington Post, January 24, 1989.
- Rigby, T.H. Political elites in the USSR : central leaders and local cadres from Lenin to Gorbachev. England: Edward Elgar Publishing Limited, 1990.
- Rosenberg, Chanie. Women and perestroika. London: Bookmarks, 1989.
- Ruthchild, Rochelle G. Women in Russia and the Soviet Union: an annotated bibliography.New York: Maxwell Macmillan International, 1993.
- Temko, Ned. “Near the top, but still not decisionmakers.” The Christian Science Monitor, October 9, 1981.
- “The Working Woman In The USSR : Aleksandra Biryukova : Free Download, Borrow, and Streaming : Internet Archive.” Internet Archive, 2015. https://archive.org/details/TheWorkingWomanInTheUssr/page/n3/mode/2up.
- Weeks, Albert L, comp. The Soviet nomenklatura: a comprehensive roster of Soviet civilian and military officials. Washington, D.C.: Washington Institute Press, 1989.
