= State Committee on the State of Emergency =

1991 political body in the Soviet Union

- Press conference in the MFA building, August 19
- Formation: 19 August 1991
- Dissolved: 21 August 1991
- Type: Self-declared rival provisional government
- Legal status: Dissolved by the Russian SFSR and Soviet Union
- Headquarters: Kremlin, Russian SFSR, Soviet Union
- Location: Moscow, Russian SFSR
- Region served: Soviet Union
- Official language: Russian
- Chairman: Gennady Yanayev
- Affiliations: CPSU; KGB; Soviet Army; Soviet Ministry of Internal Affairs

The State Committee on the State of Emergency (Russian: Государственный комитет по чрезвычайному положению, romanized: Gosudarstvenny komitet po chrezvychaynomu polozheniyu, IPA: [ɡəsʊˈdarstvʲɪn(ː)ɨj kəmʲɪˈtʲet pə tɕrʲɪzvɨˈtɕæjnəmʊ pəlɐˈʐɛnʲɪjʊ]), abbreviated as GKChP (Russian: ГКЧП) or SCSE, was a self-proclaimed political body in the Soviet Union that existed from 19 to 21 August 1991. It included a group of eight high-level Soviet officials within the Soviet government, the Communist Party, and the KGB, who attempted a coup d'état against Mikhail Gorbachev on 19 August 1991. The coup ultimately failed, with the provisional government collapsing by 22 August 1991 and several of the conspirators being prosecuted by the Supreme Court of the Russian Federation.

From 22 to 29 August 1991, former members of the dissolved SCSE and those who actively assisted them were arrested, but from June 1992 to January 1993, they were all released on their own recognizance. In April 1993, the trial began. On 23 February 1994, the defendants in the SCSE case were amnestied by the State Duma of the Federal Assembly of the Russian Federation, despite Yeltsin's objection. One of the defendants, General V.I. Varennikov, refused to accept the amnesty and his trial continued, which he ultimately won.

Diplomatic support came from several countries and entities, such as Afghanistan, China, Cuba, Iraq, Laos, Libya, North Korea, the Palestine Liberation Organization, Vietnam, Serbia, and Montenegro.

== Members ==
The eight members were:

- Gennady Yanayev (1937–2010), Vice President
- Valentin Pavlov (1937–2003), Premier
- Boris Pugo (1937–1991), Interior Minister
- Dmitry Yazov (1924–2020), Defense Minister and Marshal of the Soviet Union
- Vladimir Kryuchkov (1924–2007), Chairman of the KGB
- Oleg Baklanov (1932–2021), First Deputy Chairman of the Defense Council of the USSR
- Vasily Starodubtsev (1931–2011), Chairman of the Peasants' Union of the USSR
- Alexander Tizyakov (1926–2019), President of the Association of State Enterprises

All but Pugo were arrested and tried with treason following the coup; Pugo himself died from two gunshots to the head on 22 August 1991. His death was ruled a suicide. However, by January 1993, all of the arrested GKChP members had been released from custody pending trial. On 23 February 1994, the State Duma declared amnesty for all GKChP members and their accomplices, along with the participants of the October 1993 crisis.

== Coup d'état attempt ==
The 1991 Soviet coup d'état attempt, occurring between 19 and 21 August 1991, was an attempt by the SCSE to take control of the country from then President of the Soviet Union, Mikhail Gorbachev. The SCSE were hard-line members of the Communist Party (CPSU) who were opposed to Gorbachev's reform program and the new union treaty he had negotiated, which dispersed much of the central government's power to the republics. The coup collapsed after only two days, and although Gorbachev was restored as president, his authority was irreparably damaged and he became less influential outside of Moscow. The event destabilized the Soviet Union and many speculate that it played a role in both the demise of the CPSU and the dissolution of the Soviet Union. After the coup failed, the seven living members of the SCSE were arrested.

== Court trials ==
On 14 December 1992, a year after the attempted coup, the Prosecutor General of Russia Valentin Stepankov approved the indictment in the GKChP case. It was sent to the Military Collegium of the Supreme Court of the Russian Federation. Anatoliy Ukolov, a deputy chairman of the Collegiate, was charged with reviewing the case, and the hearing was scheduled for 26 January 1993. The defendants included the aforementioned seven living members of the group plus Oleg Shenin (1937–2009), Politburo and secretariat member; Anatoly Lukyanov (1930–2019), Chairman of the Supreme Soviet of the Soviet Union; and Valentin Varennikov (1923–2009), General of the Army, Deputy Minister of Defense, and Commander of Land Forces.

The trials lasted more than ten months, from 14 April 1993 until 1 March 1994. They were open to the public and press; however, foreign press did not participate due to lack of space in the courtroom. A prosecution commission was assigned to the case by the Collegiate, consisting of nine people and headed by Denisov, a Deputy Prosecutor General. The defense attorneys, Genri Reznik (Shenin), Genrikh Padva, Yuriy Ivanov (Kryuchkov), and Dmitriy Shteinberg (Varennikov) were hired, but in total, there were seventeen defense attorneys. After various delay tactics staged by the defense, the trial began on 30 November 1993. The main defendants were Yazov, Kryuchkov, Shenin, and Varennikov.

On 23 February 1994, the State Duma issued an amnesty to the defense, and on 1 March 1994, the case was closed with all ten defendants accepting amnesty. Varennikov requested amnesty on the condition that Mikhail Gorbachev would be the next to be prosecuted, as he accused Gorbachev of creating the recent political disorder. The court rejected his petition, and upon Varennikov sending his request to the Prosecutor General's office, it was rejected again.

Ten days after the close, the Presidium of the Supreme Court revived the prosecution, ruling that procedural infringements regarding the amnesty had occurred. The Presidium arranged a new hearing and assigned a new judge, Viktor Aleksandrovich Yaskin. He conducted the case review using revised court procedures. Yaskin offered the defendants amnesty, and all but Varennikov accepted it. Varennikov was acquitted on the argument that he was following the orders of Minister of Defense.

Kryuchkov, Yazov, Shenin, and Pavlov were named as the main conspirators.

== Further fate of GKChP members ==
Yazov spent 18 months in Matrosskaya Tishina, a prison in northern Moscow. According to the magazine Vlast No. 41(85) of 14 October 1991, he contacted the President from jail with a recorded video message, in which he repented and called himself "an old fool". Yazov denies ever doing that, and he also accepted the amnesty offered by the Russians stating that he was not guilty. He was dismissed from military service by the Presidential Order, and at his discharge, was awarded a ceremonial weapon. He was also awarded an order of honor by the President of Russian Federation. Yazov later worked as a military adviser at the General Staff Academy. He died in 2020 in Moscow, after a prolonged illness.

Baklanov spent 18 months in Matrosskaya Tishina, and then accepted amnesty in 1994, stating that he was not guilty. He later worked as a director of Rosobshchemash.

Yanayev spent 18 months in Matrosskaya Tishina. He later became a chairman of the department of national history at the Russian International Academy of Tourism.

Pavlov had been taken to a hospital during the coup with the diagnosis of hypertension, but on 29 August 1991, he was transferred to Matrosskaya Tishina. He accepted amnesty stating that he was not guilty, and later became the head of the Chasprombank. Pavlov resigned from the bank on 31 August 1995, and six months later the bank was left without license. Afterwards he was an adviser at Promstroybank, today known as Bank VTB. Pavlov died in 2003 after a series of heart attacks and is buried in Moscow.

=== Evaluations of Anatoliy Ukolov's interviews ===
According to Vzglyad, Anatoliy Ukolov, the original person charged with the prosecution of the SCSE, blamed the occurrence of the 1991 coup attempt on Gorbachev, implying that the leader should not have taken a vacation at the time. However, in an interview with Komsomol Pravda, Ukolov also mentioned how the members of GKChP chose not to follow the letter of law, but rather to take the situation into their own hands.
