= Starodubtsev =

Starodubtsev (Russian: Стародубцев) is a surname. Notable people with the surname include:

- Dmitry Starodubtsev (born 1986), Russian pole-vaulter
- Vasily Starodubtsev (1931–2011), Soviet and Russian politician
- Yuliia Starodubtseva (born 2000), Ukrainian tennis player
