= Oleg Baklanov =

Soviet politician, scientist, and businessman (1932–2021)

- Олег Бакланов
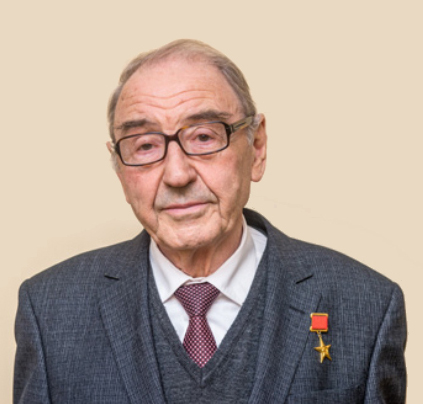
- Baklanov in 2018

Minister of General Machine Building
- In office 8 April 1983 – 25 March 1988
- Premier: Nikolai Tikhonov, Nikolai Ryzhkov
- Preceded by: Sergey Afanasyev
- Succeeded by: Vitaly Doguzhiyev

Full member of the 28th Politburo
- In office 14 July 1990 – 29 August 1991

Secretary of the 28th Central Committee
- In office 18 February 1988 – 25 April 1991

Member of the 27th Secretariat
- In office 18 February 1988 – 14 July 1990

Personal details
- Born: 17 March 1932 Kharkov, Ukrainian SSR, Soviet Union (now Kharkiv, Ukraine)
- Died: 28 July 2021 (aged 89) Moscow, Russia
- Resting place: Federal Military Memorial Cemetery
- Party: Communist Party of the Soviet Union
- Spouse: Lilia Fedorovna Baklanova
- Education: MIREA – Russian Technological University

Oleg Dmitriyevich Baklanov (Russian: Олег Дмитриевич Бакланов, Ukrainian: Олег Дмитрович Бакланов, romanized: Oleh Dmytrovych Baklanov; 17 March 1932 – 28 July 2021) was a Soviet politician, and high functionary in government and industry. He was a scientist and businessman. As Minister of General Machine Building, he was responsible for the Soviet space industry during the 1980s.

== Biography ==
Baklanov worked in an instrument engineering factory in Kharkov, Soviet Ukraine, and later became chief of the factory. He was appointed Engineering Industry Minister of the Soviet Union in 1983 and was a deputy to the Supreme Soviet from 1981 to 1991.

Baklanov was a secretary of the CPSU Central Committee from February 1988 to April 1991 and was responsible for defense issues in this role. He was a member of the State Committee on the State of Emergency during the 1991 Soviet coup d'état attempt.

From March until his arrest on August 23, 1991, he was the First Deputy Chairman of the Defense Council under the President of the Soviet Union (he was formally dismissed from office a month after his arrest).

Baklanov was brutally beaten and arrested by the security police for his role in the 1991 coup d'état attempt. He was released on recognizance not to leave in January 1993 and amnestied by the State Duma in 1994. After his release, he became the chairman of the board of governors at the Rosobshemash company.

== Death ==
Baklanov died on 28 July 2021, and is buried in the Federal Military Memorial Cemetery on 30 July. Prior to his death he was the last surviving member of the State Committee on the State of Emergency.

== Family ==
Wife - Liliya Fyodorovna Baklanova (1937–2010).

Son - Dmitry Olegovich Baklanov (born 1959), served in law enforcement agencies.

The book “The Red Dozen. The Collapse of the USSR: They Were Against It” (2012) states that Baklanov’s wife, Liliya Fyodorovna, “on the day of his arrest suffered a heart attack and was taken to the hospital, where she remained for four months,” and that his son, Dmitry Olegovich, who was engaged in “combating drug addiction and drug trafficking,” was soon dismissed from the Ministry of Internal Affairs (MVD).

== Honours and awards ==
- Hero of Socialist Labour (1976)
- Order of Lenin (1976)
- Order of the October Revolution
- Order of the Red Banner of Labour, twice
- Order of the Badge of Honour (1960)
- Lenin Prize (1982)
- Chairman of the Society of Friendship and cooperation between the peoples of Ukraine and Russia
- Member of the Presidium of the Russian Academy of Cosmonautics Tsiolkovsky
- International Academy of Information Technology
- Academician of the Academy of Security, Defence and Law Enforcement.
