= Ivan Melnikov (politician) =

Russian politician (born 1950)

Ivan Melnikov MP
- Иван Мельников
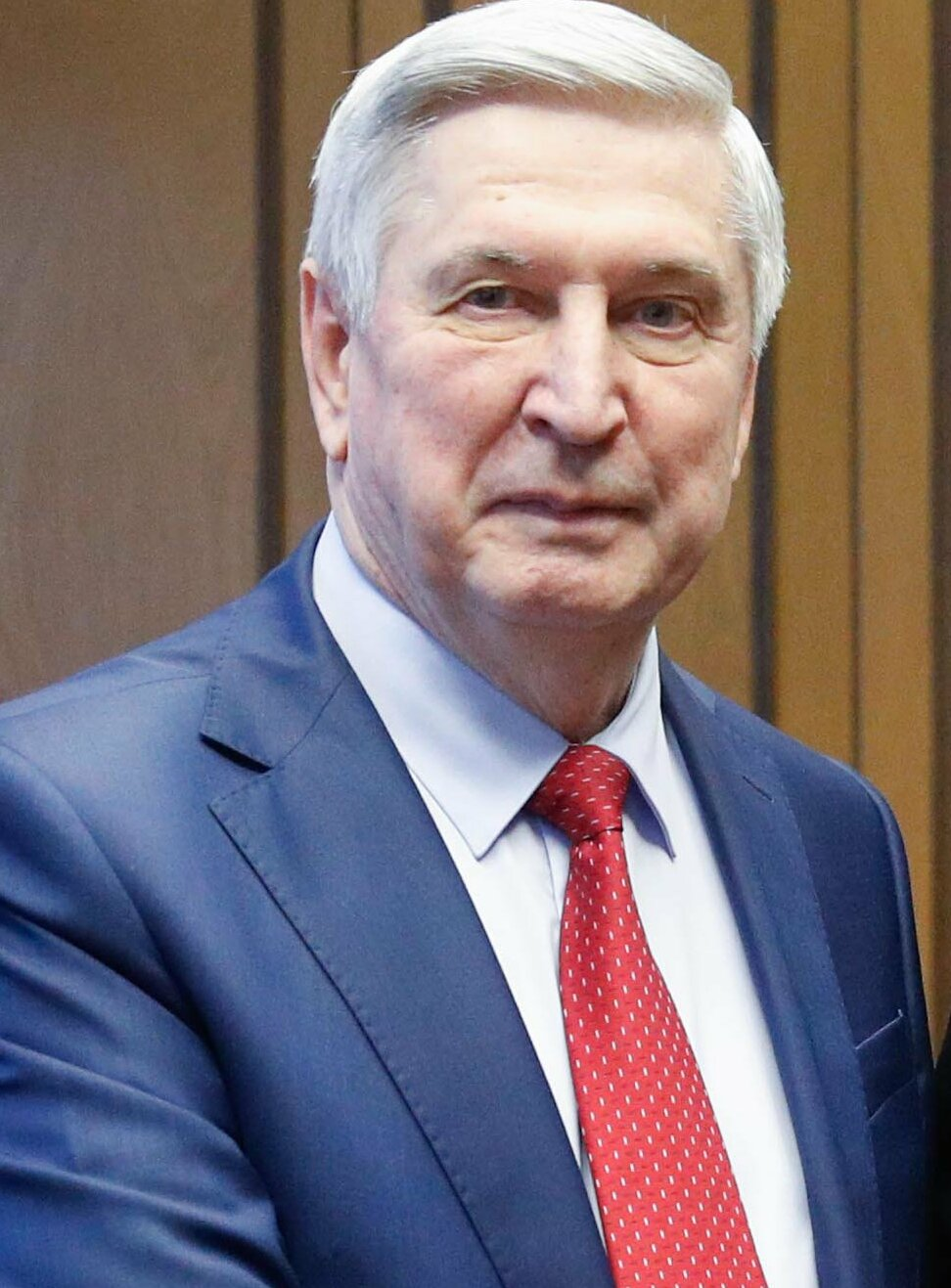
- Melnikov in 2023

First Vice Chairman of the State Duma
- Incumbent
- Assumed office 21 December 2011
- Chairman: Vyacheslav Volodin; Sergey Naryshkin (2011-2016)

Member of the State Duma (Party List Seat)
- Incumbent
- Assumed office 17 January 1996

Personal details
- Born: 7 August 1950 (age 76) Bogoroditsk, RSFSR, USSR
- Party: CPRF; CPSU (until 1991)
- Education: Moscow State University
- Occupation: Teacher; Lab Engineer; Professor; Politician
- Ivan Melnikov's voice recorded 15 July 2013

Ivan Ivanovich Melnikov (Russian: Иван Иванович Мельников; born 7 August 1950) is a Russian politician. He is the vice-chairman of the Communist Party of the Russian Federation (CPRF), and First Vice-chairman of the State Duma. He is also a professor at Moscow State University.

== Early life and education ==
Melnikov was born on 7 August 1950 in Bogoroditsk, Tula Oblast. He attended the faculty of mathematics at Moscow State University, graduating in 1972. Following this, he worked as a mathematics teacher at Boarding School No. 18, later renamed the Kolmogorov Boarding School, a mathematics and physics oriented secondary school affiliated with the university.

He completed a DPhil in mathematics in 1982, working as an instructor/lecturer and eventually an associate professor at his alma mater Moscow State University. In 1999, he obtainted a DSc in pedagogy (education science) and obtained a full professorship in 2002.

== Political career ==
An active member of the Communist Party of the Soviet Union (CPSU), he was elected to the CPSU Central Committee at the 28th Party Congress in 1990. He briefly served as a Party Secretary before the party was banned on 26 August 1991.

Melnikov helped found the Communist Party of the Russian Federation, the successor to the CPSU in Russia, in 1993. He first received a deputy mandate for the State Duma in 1995 as part of the CPRF electoral list.

== Sanctions ==
He was sanctioned by the UK government in 2014 in relation to the Russo-Ukrainian War.

Melnikov was sanctioned by the United States Department of the Treasury following the 2022 Russian invasion of Ukraine.
