= Secretariat of the 27th Congress of the Communist Party of the Soviet Union =

In session 1986–1990

The Secretariat of the 27th Congress of the Communist Party of the Soviet Union (CPSU) was in session from 1986 to 1990.

== Officers ==
Officers of the 27th Congress of the Communist Party of the Soviet Union
Title	Name	Cyrillic	Birth	Death	PM	Ethnicity	Portrait
General Secretary of the CPSU Central Committee	Mikhail Gorbachev	Михаил Горбачёв	1931	2022	1952	Russian	
Second Secretary of the CPSU Central Committee	Yegor Ligachyov	Егор Лигачёв	1920	2021	1944	Russian	

== Members ==
Members of the Secretariat of the 27th Congress of the Communist Party of the Soviet Union
Name	Cyrillic	26th SEC	28th SEC	Birth	Death	PM	Ethnicity	Gender	Portrait
Oleg Baklanov	Оле́г Бакла́нов	By-election	Reelected	1932	2021	1953	Ukrainian	Male	
Aleksandra Biryukova	Александра Бирюкова	Old	Relieved	1929	2008	1956	Russian	Female	
Viktor Chebrikov	Виктор Че́бриков	By-election	Relieved	1923	1999	1950	Ukrainian	Male	
Anatoly Dobrynin	Анато́лий Добры́нин	Old	Relieved	1919	2010	1945	Russian	Male	
Vladimir Dolgikh	Владимир Долгих	Old	Relieved	1924	2020	1942	Russian	Male	
Ivan Frolov	Иван Фролов	By-election	Reelected	1929	1999	1960	Russian	Male	
Andrey Girenko	Андрей Гиренко	By-election	Reelected	1936	2017	1963	Ukrainian	Male	
Mikhail Gorbachev	Михаил Горбачёв	Old	Reelected	1931	2022	1952	Russian	Male	
Yegor Ligachyov	Егор Лигачёв	Old	Not	1920	2021	1944	Russian	Male	
Anatoly Lukyanov	Анатолий Лукьянов	By-election	Relieved	1930	2019	1953	Russian	Male	
Yuri Manayenkov	Юрий Манаенков	By-election	Reelected	1936	2021	1960	Russian	Male	
Vadim Medvedev	Вадим Медведев	New	Not	1929	2025	1952	Russian	Male	
Viktor Nikonov	Виктор Никонов	Old	Not	1929	1993	1954	Russian	Male	
Georgy Razumovsky	Гео́ргий Разумо́вский	New	Not	1936	Alive	1961	Russian	Male	
Nikolay Slyunkov	Никола́й Слюнько́в	By-election	Not	1929	2022	1954	Belarusian	Male	
Yegor Stroyev	Его́р Стро́ев	By-election	Reelected	1937	Alive	1958	Russian	Male	
Gumer Usmanov	Гумер Усманов	By-election	Not	1932	2015	1953	Tatar	Male	
Alexander Yakovlev	Алекса́ндр Я́ковлев	New	Not	1923	2005	1944	Russian	Male	
Lev Zaykov	Лев Зайков	Old	Not	1923	2002	1957	Russian	Male	
Mikhail Zimyanin	Михаил Зимянин	Old	Relieved	1914	1995	1939	Belarusian	Male	
