= Gennady Yanayev =

Vice president of the Soviet Union from 1990 to 1991

- Геннадий Янаев
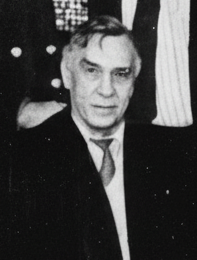
- Yanayev in 1993

Acting President of the Soviet Union (disputed)
- In office 19–21 August 1991
- Prime Minister: Valentin Pavlov
- Preceded by: Mikhail Gorbachev
- Succeeded by: Mikhail Gorbachev

Vice President of the Soviet Union
- In office 27 December 1990 – 21 August 1991
- President: Mikhail Gorbachev
- Preceded by: Anatoly Lukyanov (as vice head of state)
- Succeeded by: None (post abolished)

Chairman of the All-Union Central Council of Trade Unions
- In office April–July 1990
- Preceded by: Stepan Shalaev
- Succeeded by: None (post abolished)

Full member of the 28th Politburo
- In office 14 July 1990 – 31 January 1991

Secretary of the 28th Central Committee
- In office 14 July 1990 – 31 January 1991

Personal details
- Born: Gennady Ivanovich Yanayev; 26 August 1937 Perevoz, Gorky Oblast, Russian SFSR, Soviet Union
- Died: 24 September 2010 (aged 73) Moscow, Russia
- Cause of death: Lung cancer
- Resting place: Troyekurovskoye Cemetery
- Party: Communist Party of the Soviet Union (1962–1991)
- Education: Kutafin Moscow State Law University

Gennady Ivanovich Yanayev (Russian: Геннадий Иванович Янаев; 26 August 1937 – 24 September 2010) was a Russian politician and disputed President of the Soviet Union for three days during the August 1991 coup d'état attempt. He was ultimately arrested for his role in the coup and later pardoned. He spent the rest of his life working in the Russian tourism administration until his death on 24 September 2010.

== Early life and career ==
Yanayev was born on 26 August 1937 in the town of Perevoz, Gorky Oblast during the administration of Joseph Stalin as General Secretary of the Communist Party of the Soviet Union. He graduated from the Gorky Institute of Agriculture in 1959. After graduation he worked as the head of a mechanised agricultural unit and later as a chief engineer in the Gorky Oblast. He applied and officially became a member of the Communist Party of the Soviet Union (CPSU) in 1962. From 1963 to 1968, he held the positions of second, and subsequently first, secretary of the Gorky Komsomol, and later became Chairman of the Committee of Youth Organisations, which he held for 12 years. From 1980 to 1986 he was Deputy Chairman of the Union of Soviet Societies for Friendship and Cultural Relations with Foreign Countries. He became Secretary for International Affairs of All-Union Central Council of Trade Unions in 1986 and became Deputy Chairman of the trade unions in 1989. In April 1990 he was elected Chairman of the All-Union Central Council of Trade Unions. As chairman of the trade unions, he was not able to quell the growing labour discontent in the country, but his position granted him a seat in the Politburo of the Communist Party of the Soviet Union (CPSU) at the 28th CPSU Congress (held in 1990), alongside his election as Secretary of the Central Committee.

== Vice president ==
On 27 December 1990, Mikhail Gorbachev proposed Yanayev as Vice President of the Soviet Union. He was Gorbachev's third choice for the post; Foreign Minister Eduard Shevardnadze and Kazakh president Nursultan Nazarbayev had turned the offer down. Yanayev had initially been rejected by the Supreme Soviet, but he was finally approved by a second vote due to Gorbachev's insistence, (by a vote of 1,237 for to 563 against), only days after Shevardnadze had resigned from office due to Gorbachev's willingness to give leeway to conservatives. Yanayev said after the vote "I am a Communist to the depths of my soul."

Some weeks after Yanayev's election, a senior Soviet official described Yanayev as "Gorbachev's Quayle—a conservative nonentity, no threat to Gorbachev, and his selection would pacify the right-wing". At the beginning of January 1991, Yanayev headed a committee working on the formation of a new cabinet. Later, he was sent to the Soviet city of Kuznetsk to negotiate with a newly formed independent trade union, making this the first time since 1917 that a Russian government official had negotiated with a trade union; however, after gaining the attention of the Soviet government, the unionists withdrew their plans for a strike.

=== August Coup ===
Shortly after taking office, Yanayev joined a group of more conservative Communist politicians, led by KGB chairman Vladimir Kryuchkov, who hoped to persuade Gorbachev to declare a state of emergency. After Gorbachev announced his proposal for a New Union Treaty to form the Union of Sovereign States, as a reorganisation of the Soviet Union into a new confederation, he went on vacation to his dacha in Crimea. Believing that this new Union treaty would lead to the disintegration of the USSR, the State Committee of the State of Emergency placed Gorbachev under house arrest on 19 August, one day before the treaty was due to be signed. On that same day the Telegraph Agency of the Soviet Union (TASS) issued the coup plotters' decree, which stated: "Owing to the conditions of his health, Mikhail Gorbachev is no longer capable of carrying on the duties of the President of the USSR. In accordance with article 127, clause 7 of the USSR constitution, Vice President Gennady Yanayev has assumed the duties of the President of the USSR."

The decree made references to the growing problems facing the country such as ethnic tensions, political confrontations and chaos, which according to the coup leaders threatened the very existence of Soviet life and the territorial integrity of the USSR. Yanayev further claimed that the danger of collapse was imminent, and if the economic situation was not handled quickly, the Soviet Union would collapse. In addition, Yanayev and the rest of the state committee ordered the Cabinet of Ministers to alter the then current five-year plan to relieve the housing shortage. All city-dwellers were given one third of an acre each to combat winter food shortages by growing fruit and vegetables. When asked about Gorbachev, Yanayev replied: "Let me say that Mikhail Gorbachev is now on vacation. He is undergoing treatment, himself, in our country. He is very tired after these many years and he will need some time to get better." At a press conference, Yanayev's hands were shaking rather violently, leading many journalists to focus on Yanayev's apparent drunkenness instead of Gorbachev's alleged bad health.

On 19 August, citizens of Moscow gathered around Russia's White House and began to erect barricades around it, in which at 16:00 Yanayev responded by declaring a state of emergency in Moscow. Yanayev declared at the press conference at 17:00 that Gorbachev was "resting". He said: "Over these years he has become very tired and needs some time to get his health back." Yanayev said the Emergency Committee was committed to continuing his reforms. However, Yanayev's weak posture, trembling hands and shaky expressions made his words unconvincing. On August 21, the Presidium of the Supreme Soviet of the USSR, chaired by the heads of the chambers of the union parliament, adopted a resolution in which it declared illegal the actual dismissal of President Gorbachev from his duties and the transfer of them to the country's vice-president and, in this regard, demanded that Vice-President Yanayev cancel the decrees and emergency orders based on them. According to some historians, Yanayev was the most visible and powerful member of the Emergency Committee but was not its mastermind; Kryuchkov has been described as the "heart and soul of the conspiracy". Yanayev only agreed to head the Emergency Committee on 20 August. He was dismissed as vice president and later jailed for his crimes against the Soviet state.

In 1993, Moscow weekly Novy Vzglyad quoted Yanayev as admitting that he was drunk when he signed the decree which made him acting president, but saying that inebriation had not affected his judgment. In a 2008 interview, Yanayev said he regretted making himself acting President, further claiming that he was pressured by the more conservative members to sign the documents which declared his own presidency. He described the events of 1991 as a burden for the rest of his life.

== Later life and death ==
Yanayev was released on recognizance not to leave in January 1993. He was pardoned in 1994. He would eventually become the head of the Department of History and International Relations of the Russian International Academy of Tourism.

On 20 September 2010, Yanayev fell ill and was hospitalised at the Central Clinical Hospital in Moscow, where he was diagnosed with lung cancer. He died on 24 September 2010. The Central Committee of the Communist Party of the Russian Federation (CPRF) expressed their condolences to Yanayev's family. Gennady Zyuganov, the leader of the CPRF, said of him: "Yanayev lived an interesting, complicated and worthy life." The CPRF officially praised him as "a highly professional specialist ... a dear and trustworthy comrade". In another statement made by the CPRF, this time on their official website, they claimed: "If they had acted much more decisively, our unified country would have been preserved." He is buried at the Troyekurovskoye Cemetery, in a ceremony attended by several prominent CPRF members. He was survived by his wife and two daughters.

== Decorations and awards ==
- Order of the Red Banner of Labour, twice
- Order of the Badge of Honour, twice
