= Vladimir Ivashko =

Soviet Ukrainian politician (1932–1994)

- Владимир Ивашко (Russian); Володимир Івашко (Ukrainian)
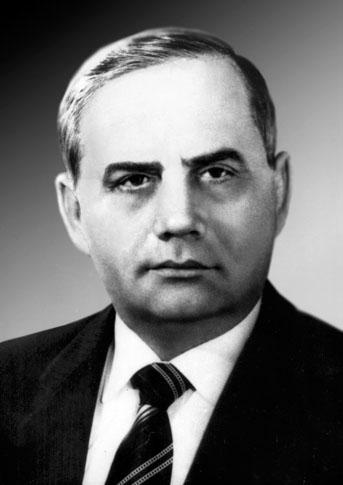
- Ivashko in 1990

Acting General Secretary of the Communist Party of the Soviet Union
- In office 24 August 1991 – 29 August 1991
- Preceded by: Mikhail Gorbachev
- Succeeded by: Position abolished

Deputy General Secretary of the Communist Party of the Soviet Union
- In office 12 July 1990 – 29 August 1991
- General Secretary: Mikhail Gorbachev
- Preceded by: Yegor Ligachev
- Succeeded by: Position abolished

First Secretary of the Communist Party of Ukraine
- In office 28 September 1989 – 22 June 1990
- Preceded by: Volodymyr Shcherbytsky
- Succeeded by: Stanislav Hurenko

Chairman of the Supreme Soviet of the Ukrainian SSR
- In office 4 June – 9 July 1990
- Preceded by: Platon Kostiuk
- Succeeded by: Leonid Kravchuk

Full member of the 27th, 28th Politburo
- In office 9 December 1989 – 29 August 1991

Member of the 28th Secretariat
- In office 14 July 1990 – 29 August 1991

Personal details
- Born: 28 October 1932 Poltava, Ukrainian SSR, Soviet Union
- Died: 13 November 1994 (aged 62) Moscow, Russia
- Party: Communist Party of the Soviet Union
- Spouse: Liudmyla Ivashko
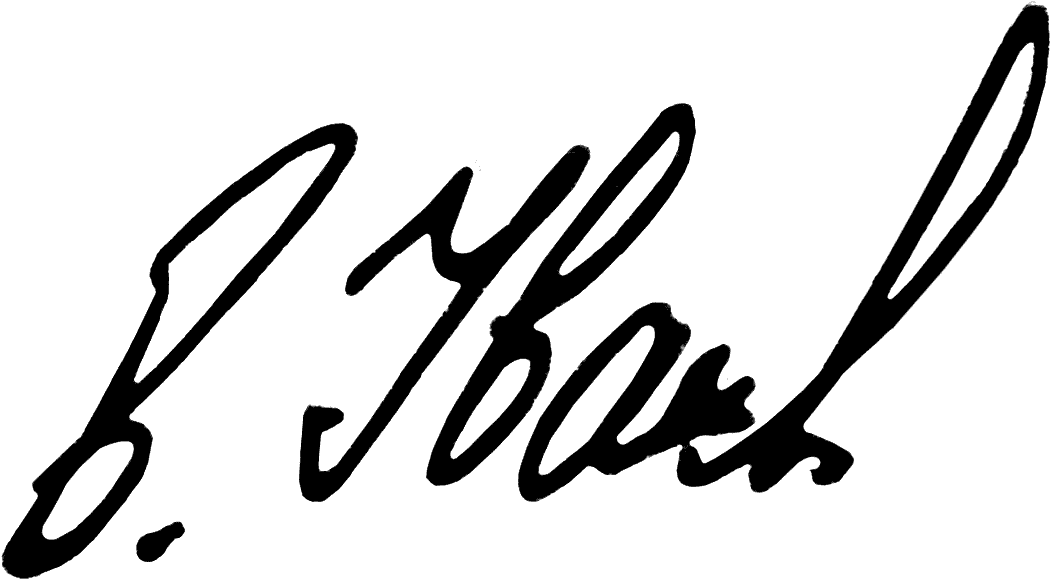
- Signature

Vladimir Antonovich Ivashko (Russian: Влади́мир Анто́нович Ива́шко; Ukrainian: Володимир Антонович Івашко, romanized: Volodymyr Antonovych Ivashko; 28 October 1932 – 13 November 1994) was a Soviet Ukrainian politician, briefly acting as General Secretary of the Communist Party of the Soviet Union (CPSU) during the period from 24 to 29 August 1991. On 24 August, Mikhail Gorbachev resigned from the post, and on 29 August the CPSU was suspended by the Supreme Soviet. Before becoming General Secretary he had been voted Gorbachev's Deputy General Secretary within the Party on 12 July 1990, a newly created position as a result of the 28th Congress of the Communist Party.

== Biography ==
The Communist Party of the Soviet Union (CPSU) during the time between Mikhail Gorbachev's resignation and its suspension was politically impotent. By the time of the 28th Congress in July 1990, the party was largely regarded as being unable to lead the country and had, across the fifteen republics of the Soviet Union, split into opposing factions favouring either independent republics or the continuation of the Soviet state. Stripped of its leading role in society, the party lost its authority to lead the nation or the cohesion that kept the party united. Actual political power lay in the positions of President of the Soviet Union (held by Gorbachev) and President of the Russian SFSR (held by Boris Yeltsin). During the August Coup he did not make public statements but on behalf of the Secretariat distributed letters to local party organizations calling on them to uphold the CPSU.

Gorbachev brought in his ally Ivashko in to replace the long-serving Volodymyr Shcherbytsky as First Secretary of the Communist Party of Ukraine on 28 September 1989. Ivashko led the Communists to victory in the first relatively free parliamentary election held in the Ukrainian SSR, which took place from 4 March to 18 March 1990, the Communists winning 331 seats to the Democratic Bloc's 111 seats. Ivashko was elected by the communist majority to the post of the Chairman of the Verkhovna Rada of the Ukrainian SSR on 4 June 1990. Since the abandonment by the Communists of their "leading role" in early 1990 this position now superseded that of First Secretary of the Communist Party as the most powerful position in Ukraine.

He resigned his position as First Secretary on 22 June 1990 following opposition demonstrations against his simultaneous occupation of both the posts of First Secretary of the ruling party and Chairman of the legislature. However, on 9 July 1990 he too resigned as Chairman of the Verkhovna Rada of the Ukrainian SSR after declining to be recalled to Kiev during the 28th Congress of the Communist Party in Moscow, and a few days later successfully secured the position of Deputy General Secretary of the CPSU.

On August 23, 1990, a secret memorandum from Ivashko outlined strategies to hide the Communist Party's assets through Russian and international joint ventures because Boris Yeltsin, who was the new president of the Russian Republic in the Soviet Union, wanted to levy taxes on the Communist Party's vast administrative property holdings and on the party itself. The memorandum was to organize the transfer of CPSU funds, CPSU financing and support of its operations through associations, ventures, foundations, etc. which are to act as invisible economics. (Note: Richard L. Palmer, president of Cachet International, Inc., was the CIA station chief at the United States Embassy in Moscow from 1992 to 1994.) In November 1990, the offshore structure Fimaco was formed by the Gosbank to hide these funds. According to Sergei Tretyakov, KGB chief Vladimir Kryuchkov sent US$50 billion worth of funds of the Communist Party to an unknown location in the lead-up to the collapse of the USSR. (Note: Sergei Tretyakov, SVR rezident in United States from 1995 to 2000, was a double agent for the FBI from 1997 to 2000.)

Following the failed August 1991 Soviet coup d'état attempt, Gorbachev resigned from his post of General Secretary of the Communist Party of the Soviet Union and Ivashko became acting General Secretary. On 29 August 1991 the activity of the CPSU was suspended throughout the country, on 6 November Yeltsin banned the activities of the party in Russia and Gorbachev resigned from the presidency on 25 December; the following day the Soviet of Republics dissolved the Soviet Union.

Ivashko retired in 1992 and died on 13 November 1994, at the age of 62, after an undetermined long illness.

== Sources ==
- Belton, Catherine (23 June 2020). Putin's People: How the KGB Took Back Russia and Then Took on the West. Farrar, Straus, Giroux. ISBN 978-0374238711.
- Earley, Pete (2008). Comrade J: The Untold Secrets of Russia's Master Spy in America After the End of the Cold War. Putnam. ISBN 9780399154393.

→==External links==

- Volodymyr Ivashko in the Encyclopedia of History of Ukraine

Political offices
| Preceded by Platon Kostyuk | Chairman of the Verkhovna Rada of the Ukrainian SSR; 4 June 1990 – 9 July 1990 | Succeeded by Ivan Pliushch (acting) |
Party political offices
| Preceded by Mikhail Gorbachev | General Secretary of the Central Committee of the Communist Party of the Soviet Union acting 24–29 August 1991 | Succeeded by Office abolished |
| Preceded by Volodymyr Shcherbytsky | First Secretary the Communist Party of the Ukrainian SSR; 28 September 1989 – 22 June 1990 | Succeeded by Stanislav Hurenko |
| Preceded by Oleksiy Titarenko | Second Secretary the Communist Party of the Ukrainian SSR; 8 February 1986 – 28 September 1989 | Succeeded by Stanislav Hurenko |
