= Anatoly Lukyanov =

Russian politician (1930–2019)

- Анатолий Лукьянов
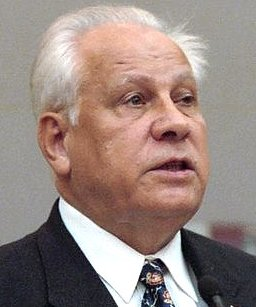
- Lukyanov in 1999

Member of the State Duma
- In office 11 January 1994 – 29 December 2003

Chairman of the Presidium of the Supreme Soviet of the Soviet Union
- In office 15 March 1990 – 4 September 1991
- President: Mikhail Gorbachev
- Preceded by: Mikhail Gorbachev
- Succeeded by: Office abolished

First Deputy Chairman of the Supreme Soviet of the Soviet Union
- In office 1 October 1988 – 15 March 1990
- President: Mikhail Gorbachev
- Preceded by: Pyotr Demichev
- Succeeded by: Gennady Yanayev (as vice president)

Head of the General Department of the Central Committee
- In office 24 May 1985 – 17 January 1987
- Preceded by: Klavdii Bogolyubov
- Succeeded by: Valery Boldin

Candidate member of the 27th Politburo
- In office 30 September 1988 – 14 July 1990

Member of the 27th Secretariat
- In office 28 January 1987 – 30 September 1988

Personal details
- Born: 7 May 1930 Smolensk, Russian SFSR, Soviet Union
- Died: 9 January 2019 (aged 88) Moscow, Russia
- Resting place: Troyekurovskoye Cemetery
- Party: Communist Party of the Russian Federation (1993-2019)
- Other political affiliations: Communist Party of the Soviet Union (1953-1991)
- Education: Moscow State University
- Anatoly Lukyanov's voice Recorded 8 June 2012 by Oral History Foundation

Anatoly Ivanovich Lukyanov (Russian: Анатолий Иванович Лукьянов, 7 May 1930 – 9 January 2019) was a Russian Communist politician who was the Chairman of the Presidium of the Supreme Soviet of the USSR between 15 March 1990 and 4 September 1991. One of the founders of the Communist Party of the Russian Federation (CPRF) in 1993, he was described by its leader Gennady Zyuganov as having been the Deng Xiaoping of the party. He published books of poetry under his own name and under the pseudonyms Osenev (Осенев) and Dneprov (Днепров).

Lukyanov was an early political ally of Mikhail Gorbachev, supporting his efforts in issues such as the fight against corruption and the start of reforms in the economy. However, beginning in 1987–1988, he increasingly sympathized with the party establishment, correctly foreseeing that Gorbachev's policies would lead to the Soviet collapse.

== Early life ==
Lukyanov was born in Smolensk on 7 May 1930, the son of a Red Army officer who was killed in action during World War II. He graduated from the Law School of the Moscow State University in 1953, while also being a member of the Communist Youth League (Komsomol). During his years in law school, he befriended Mikhail Gorbachev, who was also studying there at the time, becoming an early political ally of the future leader. He went on to earn a post-graduate degree in Constitutional Law and a PhD in Public Law.

== Early career ==
From 1956 to 1961 Lukyanov worked as a legal adviser at the Legal Commission of the Soviet Council of Ministers. He later was an adviser on legislation-drafting at the Supreme Soviet and worked on constitutional law issues at the Central Committee. He also served as a constitutional adviser to the governments of the Polish People's Republic and the Hungarian People's Republic. All the while he benefited from being constantly based in Moscow, at the center of government.

== Political career ==
Lukyanov in the 1980s

In 1975-77 he worked on drafting the 1977 Soviet Constitution, which replaced the 1936 Soviet Constitution. From 1977 till 1983 he was Chief of the Secretariat of the Supreme Soviet of the Soviet Union. He was also a leading member of the powerful Central Auditing Commission. Lukyanov was a secretary of the CPSU Central Committee from January 1987 and a candidate member of the Politburo from September 1988.

Lukyanov was elected vice-chairman of the Presidium Supreme Soviet of the Soviet Union in March 1989, and chairman of the Presidium the following year. In 1991, Boris Yeltsin and Ivan Silayev accused him of being the leading force behind the Soviet coup attempt of 1991. Lukyanov was arrested on 29 August 1991, and held for fifteen months on charges of conspiracy. On September 4, he was relieved of his post as speaker of the union parliament. Throughout the investigation, Lukyanov denied complicity.

Lukyanov was the Chairman of the Central Advisory Council of the Communist Party of the Russian Federation, and the senior adviser to party leader Gennady Zyuganov, since co-founding the party in 1993.

Lukyanov was elected as a deputy to the first three State Dumas of the Russian Federation (1993, 1995 and 1999). His last political position was as Chairman of the Duma Committee on Constitutional Law. He did not participate in the elections of 2003 and instead became a board member of the company OEG Petroservis.

== Death ==
Lukyanov was found dead in his Moscow home on 9 January 2019, at the age of 88, after suffering from an unspecified illness. He is buried at Troyekurovskoye Cemetery in Moscow on 11 January.

== Legacy ==
The Lukyanov Doctrine in Russian academic parlance may bear a striking resemblance to the Karaganov Doctrine.
