= Secretariat of the 28th Congress of the Communist Party of the Soviet Union =

The Secretariat of the 28th Congress of the Communist Party of the Soviet Union (CPSU) was in session from 1990 to 1991.

== Officers ==
Officers of the 28th Congress of the Communist Party of the Soviet Union
Title	Name	Cyrillic	Birth	Death	PM	Ethnicity	Portrait
General Secretary of the CPSU Central Committee	Mikhail Gorbachev	Михаил Горбачёв	1931	2022	1952	Russian	
Deputy General Secretary of the CPSU Central Committee	Vladimir Ivashko	Влади́мир Ива́шко	1932	1994	1960	Ukrainian	

== Secretaries ==
Secretaries of the 28th Congress of the Communist Party of the Soviet Union
Name	Cyrillic	27th SEC	28th SEC	Birth	Death	PM	Ethnicity	Gender	Portrait
Oleg Baklanov	Оле́г Бакла́нов	Old	Banned	1932	2021	1953	Russian	Male	
Alexander Dzasokhov	Александр Дзасохов	New	Banned	1934	Alive	1957	Ossetian	Male	
Valentin Falin	Baлeнтин Фалин	New	Banned	1926	2018	1953	Russian	Male	
Boris Gidaspov	Бори́с Гида́спов	New	Banned	1933	2007	1962	Russian	Male	
Andrey Girenko	Андрей Гиренко	Old	Banned	1936	2017	1963	Ukrainian	Male	
Vladimir Kalashnikov	Владимир Калашников	By-election	Banned	1947	Alive	1973	Russian	Male	
Valentin Kuptsov	Валентин Купцов	New	Banned	1937	Alive	1944	Russian	Male	
Pyotr Luchinsky	Пётр Лучинский	By-election	Banned	1941	Alive	1964	Moldovan	Male	
Yuri Manayenkov	Юрий Манаенков	New	Banned	1936	2021	1960	Russian	Male	
Ivan Melnikov	Ива́н Ме́льников	By-election	Banned	1950	Alive	1972	Russian	Male	
Galina Semenova	Галина Семёнова	New	Banned	1937	2016	1965	Russian	Female	
Oleg Shenin	Олег Шенин	New	Banned	1937	2009	1962	Russian	Male	
Yegor Stroyev	Его́р Стро́ев	Old	Banned	1937	Alive	1958	Russian	Male	
Gennady Yanayev	Геннадий Янаев	New	Relieved	1937	2010	1962	Russian	Male	

== Members ==
Members of the Secretariat of the 28th Congress of the Communist Party of the Soviet Union
Name	Cyrillic	27th SEC	28th SEC	Birth	Death	PM	Ethnicity	Gender	Portrait
Viktor Aniskin	Виктор Анискин	New	Banned	1948	2013	1974	Russian	Male	
Valentin Gayvoronsky	Валентин Гайворонский	New	Banned	1948	Alive	1973	Russian	Male	
Alexander Maltsev	Александр Мальцев	New	Banned	1952	Alive	1985	Russian	Male	
Ivan Melnikov	Ива́н Ме́льников	New	By-election	1950	Alive	1972	Russian	Male	
Aleksandr Teplenichev	Александр Тепленичев	New	Banned	1937	Alive	1964	Russian	Male	
Gulchekhra Turgunova	Гулчехра Тургунова	New	Banned	1944	Alive	1965	Uzbek	Female	
