= Enn-Arno Sillari =

Enn-Arno Sillari (born March 4, 1944 in Tallinn) is an Estonian politician who served as the last First Secretary of the Central Committee of the Communist Party of Estonia from 1990 to 1992. He was also Chairman of the Supreme Soviet of the Estonian SSR from 1989 to 1990.

== Education and early career ==
Sillari was born on March 4, 1944 in Tallinn into a family of employees. He graduated from Tallinn 27th 7-grade school in 1958 and Tallinn 39th Secondary School in 1962. He then studied mechanics at the Tallinn Polytechnic Institute, from where he transferred to Kaunas Polytechnic Institute, from which he graduated in 1967 with a degree in mechanical processing of fibers. In 1972, Sillari joined the Communist Party of the Soviet Union and began his party career in the Communist Party of the Estonian SSR. From 1974 to 1976, Sillari was the head of the industry and transport department of the Lenin District Committee of the Tallinn City Committee of the Estonian Communist Party. From 1976 to 1981, he was instructor, head of sector, inspector, deputy, first deputy head of department of the Central Committee of the Communist Party of Estonia. From 1981 to 1984, he was Inspector of the Department of Organizational and Party Work of the CPSU Central Committee.

== Political activity ==
From 1986-1989, he was the First Secretary of the Tartu City Party Committee. From 1986-1989, he was the first secretary of the Tallinn City Committee of the Estonian Communist Party. From 1989-1990, he was Secretary of the Central Committee of the Communist Party of Estonia. In 1985 he was elected as a deputy of the Supreme Council of the Estonian SSR of the 11th convocation. Sillari was the Chairman of the Supreme Soviet of the Estonian SSR from May 18, 1989 to March 18, 1990. He was First Secretary of the ECP Governing Council from 25 March 1990 to 15 October 1992. He was also the first and last Estonian to be a member of the Politburo of the 28th Congress of the Communist Party of the Soviet Union from July 14, 1990 to August 23, 1991.

In March 1990, the Estonian Communist Party experienced a split. The majority of the party, led by Vaino Väljas, who advocated Estonian sovereignty, declared the ECP's withdrawal from the CPSU. Enn-Arno Sillari, who supported the split, became First Secretary of the newly formed party, which was named the "Communist Party (Independent) of Estonia." In this capacity, he presided over the 21st (January 26, 1991) and 22nd (November 28, 1992) party congresses.

Following the 20th Congress of the Communist Party of the Soviet Union, he was elected a member of the Central Committee of the CPSU (1990-1991). After the 1991 Soviet coup attempt and the subsequent ban on the CPSU, Sillari was automatically stripped of all his posts in the CPSU.

After Estonia's independence was recognized, he continued to lead the Communist Party of Estonia, later renamed the Estonian Democratic Labour Party. Following its defeat in the 1992 parliamentary elections, Sillari resigned as First Secretary.

== Later life ==
He was elected as a member of the Tallinn City Council and is currently engaged in business. He was one of the owners of the company Balteco until April 2024.
