= Vasily Starodubtsev =

Soviet-Russian politician

- Василий Стародубцев
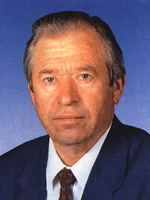

Member of the State Duma (Party List Seat)
- In office 24 December 2007 – 30 December 2011
- Succeeded by: Oleg Lebedev

2nd Governor of Tula Oblast
- In office 31 March 1997 – 29 April 2005
- Preceded by: Nikolai Sevryugin
- Succeeded by: Vyacheslav Dudka

Member of the Federation Council from Tula Oblast
- ex-officio as Governor
- In office 16 April 1997 – 25 December 2001
- Preceded by: Nikolai Sevryugin
- Succeeded by: Anatoly Vaskov
- by popular election
- In office 11 January 1994 – 15 January 1996 Serving with Alexander Titkin
- Preceded by: office established
- Succeeded by: Nikolai Sevryugin; Victor Derevianko

Member of the State Committee on the State of Emergency
- In office 19 August 1991 – 21 August 1991
- President: Gennady Yanayev

Personal details
- Born: 25 December 1931 Volovchik, Volovsky District, Central Black Earth Oblast, Russian SFSR, USSR
- Died: 30 December 2011 (aged 80) Novomoskovsk, Russia
- Party: CPSU (until 1991); CPRF (from 1995)
- Other political affiliations: Agrarian Party of Russia (1993-2004)
- Children: Alexander; Natalya
- Education: Voronezh Agricultural Institute (DPhil)
- Occupation: Agronomist; Farmer

Military service
- Allegiance: Soviet Union
- Branch/service: Soviet Air Force
- Years of service: 1951-1955
- Rank: Junior lieutenant

Vasily Alexandrovich Starodubtsev (Russian: Василий Александрович Стародубцев; 25 December 1931 – 30 December 2011) was a Soviet and Russian politician and governor of Tula Oblast from 1997 to 2005. He was also the Chairman of the Peasants Union of the USSR, during which he served as a member of the State Committee on the State of Emergency in the 1991 Soviet coup d'état attempt. He was a leader of the Agrarian Party of Russia.

== Biography ==
Born into a peasant family, he began his political career at the age of 16 as an ordinary collective farmer and later became a collective farm foreman in the Lipetsk region. Since 1949, he was a commodity manager and foreman of the Construction and Installation Department No. 22 in the city of Zhukovsky (Moscow district). At the same time, he studied at flight courses at his local flying club.

After his graduation, he was drafted into the Armed Forces and, between 1951 and 1955, he served in military aviation units, flew as a flight mechanic on combat aircraft, and was transferred to the reserve with the rank of second lieutenant.

Since 1955, he was a bulk carrier, a mining machine operator at Mine No.36 of the Stalinogorskugol Trust in the city of Novomoskovsk (Tula region). From 1959 to 1965, he studied at the Voronezh Agricultural Institute, and became a "scientific agronomist-economist". In 1966 he graduated from the All-USSR Correspondence Agricultural Institute with a degree in economics and organization of agriculture.

From 1964 to 1997 he became the chairman of the collective farm "Lenin" in the Novomoskovsky district.

Among his awards were Hero of Socialist Labour title, three Orders of Lenin, USSR State Prize, Order of the October Revolution, Order of the Badge of Honour. He had Candidate of Sciences degree in agriculture and was a corresponding member of VASKhNIL.

Starodubtsev was a member of the Federation Council of Russia (1993–96; also in 1997–2001 as a region governor) and of the State Duma (2007–11).

Starodubtsev was a member of the Communist Party of the Russian Federation.

Government offices
Preceded by Nikolai Sevryugin	Governor of Tula Oblast; 1997–2005	Succeeded by Vyacheslav Dudka
