= Viktor Donskikh =

Russian politician (1935–2022)

Member of the Congress of People's Deputies of Russia
- In office 1991–1993

Member of the Central Committee of the Communist Party of the Soviet Union
- In office 1990–1991

First Secretary of the Lipetsk Regional Committee of the CPSU
- In office 23 September 1989 – 14 August 1991
- Preceded by: Yuriy Manayenkov
- Succeeded by: Vladimir Toporkov

Personal details
- Born: Viktor Vasilievich Donskikh; 8 July 1935 Krasnodon, Stalino Oblast, Ukrainian SSR, USSR
- Died: 4 October 2022 (aged 87) Lipetsk, Russian Federation
- Party: CPSU
- Occupation: Repairman

Viktor Vasilievich Donskikh (Russian: Ви́ктор Васи́льевич Донски́х; 8 July 1935 – 4 October 2022) was a Soviet and Russian politician. A member of the Communist Party, he served in the Congress of People's Deputies of Russia from 1991 to 1993 and was First Secretary of the Lipetsk Regional Committee of the CPSU from 1989 to 1991.

Donskikh died in Lipetsk on 4 October 2022, at the age of 87.
