= Vladimir Movsisyan =

Armenian politician

- Վլադիմիր Մովսիսյան
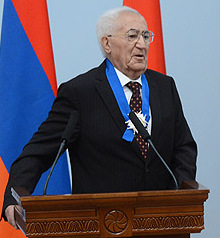
- Movsisyan in 2013

Minister of Agriculture of Armenia
- In office 1996–1999
- President: Levon Ter-Petrosyan
- Prime Minister: Armen Sarkissian; Robert Kocharyan

First Secretary of the Communist Party of Armenia
- In office April 5, 1990 – November 30, 1990
- Preceded by: Suren Harutyunyan
- Succeeded by: Stepan Pogosyan

Personal details
- Born: Vladimir Migranovich Movsisyan; November 12, 1933 Shenavan, Transcaucasian SFSR, Soviet Union
- Died: November 5, 2014 (aged 80) Yerevan, Armenia
- Occupation: Politician

Vladimir Migranovich Movsisyan (Armenian: Վլադիմիր Մովսիսյան; November 12, 1933 – November 5, 2014) was a Soviet and Armenian politician.

== Biography ==
He studied at Highest school of CPSU Central Committee. He ruled the agro-industry in Soviet Armenia. In 1990 he was the First Secretary of the Communist Party of Armenia the last one who officially ruled Soviet Armenia (Movsisyan was succeeded by the Chairman of the Supreme Soviet of the Republic of Armenia Levon Ter-Petrosyan).

In 1993 he administered the defence of Ijevan. In the 1990s he was the governor of Gegharkunik, then the Minister of agriculture of Armenia.

Movsisyan was also awarded the prestigious St. Mesrop Mashtots medal.

== Death ==
Movsisyan died on November 5, 2014 in Yerevan, aged 80.
