= Galina Semenova =

- Галина Семёнова
- Semenova in 1990

Chair of the CPSU Central Committee Commission on Family, Women and Demographic Policy
- In office 14 July 1990 – 6 November 1991

Personal details
- Born: 24 April 1937 Smolensk, Russian SFSR, Soviet Union
- Died: 19 November 2017 (aged 80) Moscow, Russia
- Resting place: Nikolo-Arkhangelskoye Cemetery, Moscow
- Citizenship: Soviet
- Party: Communist Party of the Soviet Union
- Education: Candidate of Philosophical Sciences
- Alma mater: University of Lviv
- Profession: Civil servant

Galina Vladimirovna Semenova (24 April 1937 – 19 November 2017) was a Soviet-Russian Politician and a high-standing member of the Communist Party of the Soviet Union (CPSU). She was a member of the CPSU Politburo (28th term) and the CPSU Secretariat (28th term). She was one of four women ever to be a part of the Politburo, one of three women to be full members of the Politburo, and one of seven women to serve in the Secretariat.
