= Politburo of the 28th Congress of the Communist Party of the Soviet Union =

28th Politburo
- 27th Politburo ← → Party dissolved
- Duration: 14 July 1990 – 29 August 1991

The Politburo of the 28th Congress of the Communist Party of the Soviet Union was in session from 1990 to 1991.

The new politburo was expunged and weakened, and apart from Mikhail Gorbachev himself, no members also held positions in the state or government leadership of the Soviet Union. Included in the new politburo were all the republic party heads. The resulting geographical diversity made the past practice of weekly meetings impractical. In addition, the category of nonvoting candidate members was dropped.

== Composition ==
Members of the Political Bureau of the 28th Congress of the Communist Party of the Soviet Union
Name	Cyrillic	27th POL	28th POL	Birth	Death	PM	Ethnicity	Gender	Portrait
Dzhumgalbek Amanbayev	Джумгалбек Аманбаев	By-election	Banned	1946	2005	1972	Kyrgyz	Male	
Lembit Annus	Лембит Аннус	By-election	Banned	1941	2018	1963	Estonian	Male	
Mykolas Burokevičius	Миколас Бурокявичюс	New	Banned	1927	2016	1946	Lithuanian	Male	
Alexander Dzasokhov	Александр Дзасохов	New	Banned	1934	Alive	1957	Ossetian	Male	
Grigore Eremei	Григорий Еремей	By-election	Banned	1935	2024	1957	Moldovan	Male	
Ivan Frolov	Иван Фролов	New	Banned	1929	1999	1960	Russian	Male	
Mikhail Gorbachev	Михаил Горбачёв	Old	Resigned	1931	2022	1952	Russian	Male	
Givi Gumbaridze	Гиви Гумбаридзе	New	Relieved	1945	Alive	1972	Georgian	Male	
Stanislav Gurenko	Станисла́в Гуре́нко	New	Banned	1936	2013	1961	Ukrainian	Male	
Vladimir Ivashko	Влади́мир Ива́шко	New	Banned	1932	1994	1960	Ukrainian	Male	
Islam Karimov	Ислам Каримов	New	Banned	1938	2016	1964	Uzbek	Male	
Pyotr Luchinsky	Пётр Лучинский	New	Banned	1941	Alive	1964	Moldovan	Male	
Qahhor Mahkamov	Кахар Махкамов	New	Banned	1932	2016	1957	Tajik	Male	
Anatoly Malofeyev	Анато́лий Малофе́ев	By-election	Banned	1933	2022	1957	Belarusian	Male	
Absamat Masaliyev	Абсамат Масалиев	New	Relieved	1933	2004	1960	Kyrgyz	Male	
Vladimir Movsisyan	Владимир Мовсисян	New	Relieved	1933	2014	1961	Armenian	Male	
Ayaz Mutallibov	Аяз Муталибов	New	Banned	1938	2022	1963	Azerbaijani	Male	
Nursultan Nazarbayev	Нурсултан Назарбаев	New	Banned	1940	Alive	1962	Kazakh	Male	
Saparmurat Niyazov	Сапармурат Ниязов	New	Banned	1940	2006	1962	Turkmen	Male	
Stepan Pogosyan	Степан Погосян	By-election	Relieved	1932	2012	1956	Armenian	Male	
Ivan Polozkov	Иван Полозков	New	Banned	1935	Alive	1958	Russian	Male	
Yuri Prokofyev	Юрий Прокофьев	New	Banned	1939	Alive	1960	Russian	Male	
Alfrēds Rubiks	Альфред Рубикс	New	Banned	1935	Alive	1958	Latvian	Male	
Galina Semenova	Галина Семёнова	New	Banned	1937	2016	1965	Russian	Female	
Oleg Shenin	Олег Шенин	New	Banned	1937	2009	1962	Russian	Male	
Enn-Arno Sillari	Энн-Арно Силлари	New	Relieved	1944	Alive	1972	Estonian	Male	
Yefrem Sokolov	Ефре́м Соколо́в	New	Relieved	1926	2022	1955	Belarusian	Male	
Yegor Stroyev	Его́р Стро́ев	New	Banned	1937	Alive	1958	Russian	Male	
Mikhail Surkov	Михаил Сурков	By-election	Banned	1945	Alive	1968	Russian	Male	
Gennady Yanayev	Геннадий Янаев	New	Relieved	1937	2010	1962	Russian	Male	

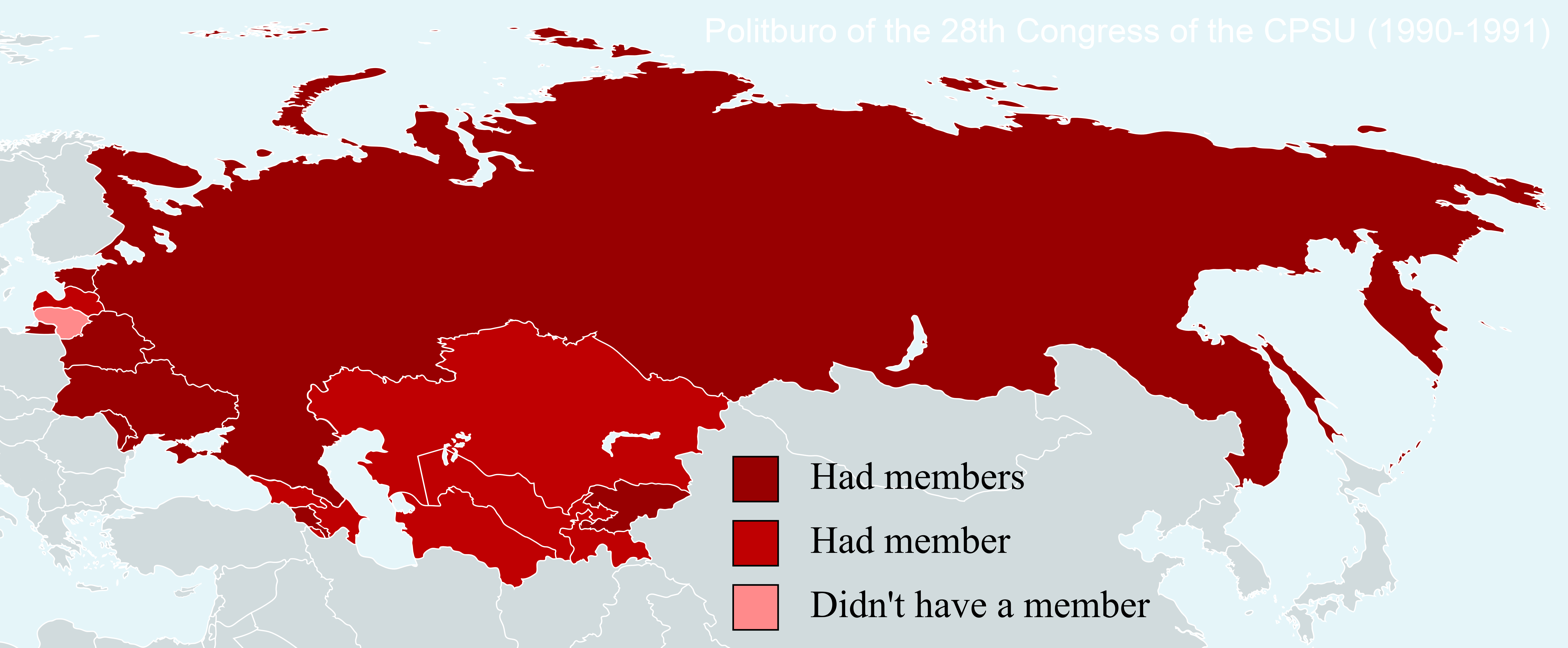
