= Stepan Pogosyan =

- Ստեփան Պողոսյան

First Secretary of the Communist Party of Armenia
- In office 30 November 1990 – 14 May 1991
- Preceded by: Vladimir Movsisyan
- Succeeded by: Aram Sargsyan

Member of Soviet Union Communist Party Central Committee
- In office 1990–1991

Personal details
- Born: Stepan Karapetovich Pogosyan (Poghosyan); February 10, 1932 Agakchi, Talin, Armenia, Transcaucasian SFSR, Soviet Union
- Died: May 17, 2012 (aged 80) Yerevan, Armenia
- Party: Communist Party of Armenia Democratic Party of Armenia
- Education: Yerevan State University
- Occupation: historian and politician
- Profession: Doctor of historical sciences, Professor

Stepan Karapetovich Pogosyan (Poghosyan) (Armenian: Ստեփան Պողոսյան; February 10, 1932 – May 17, 2012) was an Armenian historian and politician, a communist and social-democrat activist.

He studied at Yerevan State University. Then he ruled the state tele-radio-industry in Soviet Armenia for many years. From November, 1990 to May, 1991 he was the First Secretary of the Communist Party of Armenia, a member of Soviet Union Communist Party Central Committee (1990–91).

Poghosyan was a Doctor of historical sciences, Professor. He was an author of a number of books. He was also one of the leading members of Democratic Party of Armenia.
