= Politburo of the Communist Party of the Soviet Union =

Supreme political authority in Soviet Union

Politburo of the Central Committee of the Communist Party of the Soviet Union Политическое бюро Центрального комитета Коммунистической партии Советского Союза
- Emblem of the CPSU

History
- Founded: 10 October 1917 (initial); 25 March 1919 (reestablished)
- Disbanded: 6 November 1991

Leadership
- Elected by: Central Committee
- Responsible to: Central Committee
- Seats: Varied

Meeting place
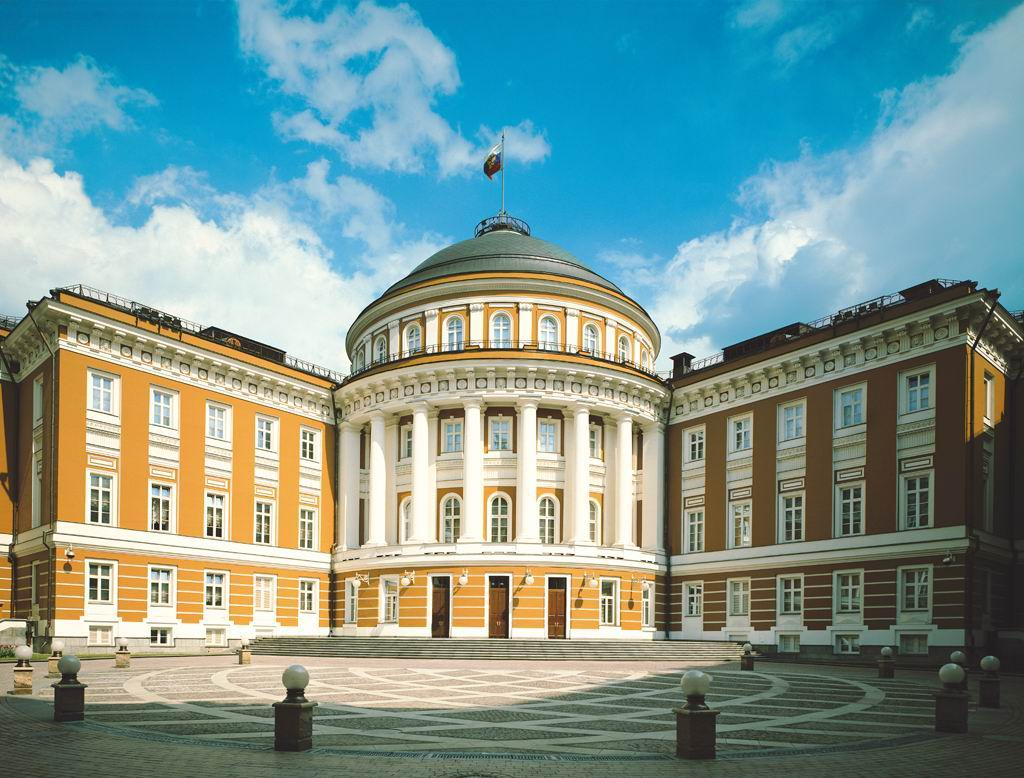
- Kremlin Senate, Moscow, Russian SFSR

The Political Bureau of the Central Committee of the Communist Party of the Soviet Union, (Note: Russian: Политическое бюро Центрального комитета Коммунистической партии Советского Союза, romanized: Politicheskoye byuro Tsentral'nogo komiteta Kommunisticheskoy partii Sovetskogo Soyuza, IPA: [pəlʲɪˈtʲitɕɪskəjɪ bʲʊˈro tsɨnˈtralʲnəvə kəmʲɪˈtʲetə kəmʊnʲɪˈsʲtʲitɕɪskəj ˈpartʲɪ(j)ɪ sɐˈvʲetskəvə sɐˈjuzə].) abbreviated as Politburo, (Note: Russian: Политбюро, IPA: [pɐˌlʲidbʲʊˈro].) was the de facto highest executive authority in the Communist Party of the Soviet Union (CPSU). While elected by and formally accountable to the Central Committee, in practice the Politburo operated as the ruling body of Soviet Russia and the Soviet Union from its creation in 1919 until the party's dissolution in 1991. Full members and candidate (non-voting) members held among the most powerful positions in the Soviet hierarchy, often overlapping with top state roles. Its duties, typically carried out at weekly meetings, included formulating state policy, issuing directives, and ratifying appointments.

The Politburo was originally established as a small group of senior Bolsheviks shortly before the October Revolution of 1917, and was re-established in 1919 to decide on urgent matters during the Russian Civil War. It operated on the principles of democratic centralism, though in practice it increasingly centralized power in the hands of a few. Under Joseph Stalin, the party's General Secretary from 1922 to 1952, the Politburo evolved into an instrument of personal dictatorship. His domination of the body was such that its sessions were often perfunctory, and during the Great Purge from 1936 to 1938, even Politburo members were not immune to persecution. The body was renamed the Presidium between 1952 and 1966. After Stalin's death in 1953, the Politburo's authority became more collective under leaders Nikita Khrushchev and Leonid Brezhnev. During the Brezhnev era from 1964 to 1982, the Politburo grew in size and became increasingly bureaucratic in character. As General Secretary from 1985, Mikhail Gorbachev attempted to reform the Politburo's functions during perestroika, shifting power away from party structures and toward state institutions. The Politburo was officially disbanded upon the banning of the CPSU in late 1991.

== History ==
=== Background ===
On 18 August 1917, the top Bolshevik leader, Vladimir Lenin, set up a political bureau—known first as Narrow Composition, and after 23 October 1917, as Political Bureau—specifically to direct the October Revolution, with only seven members (Lenin, Leon Trotsky, Grigory Zinoviev, Lev Kamenev, Grigori Sokolnikov, Joseph Stalin, and Andrei Bubnov), but this precursor did not outlast the event; the Central Committee continued with the political functions. However, due to practical reasons, usually fewer than half of the members attended the regular Central Committee meetings during this time, even though they decided all key questions.

The 8th Party Congress in 1919 formalized this reality and re-established what would later on become the true center of political power in the Soviet Union. It ordered the Central Committee to appoint a five-member Politburo to decide on questions too urgent to await full Central Committee deliberation. The original members of the Politburo were Lenin, Trotsky, Stalin, Kamenev, and Nikolai Krestinsky.

=== Early years: 1919–1934 ===
The Soviet system was based upon the system conceived by Lenin, often referred to as Leninism. Certain historians and political scientists credit Lenin for the evolution of the Soviet political system after his death. Others, such as Leonard Schapiro, argue that the system itself evolved from an inner-party democratic system to a monolithic one in 1921, with the establishment of the Control Commission, the ban on factions and the power of the Central Committee to expel members they deemed unqualified. These rules were implemented to strengthen party discipline. However, the party continued under Lenin and the early post-Lenin years to try to establish democratic procedures within the party. For instance, by 1929, leading party members began criticizing the party apparatus, represented by the Secretariat headed by Stalin, of having too much control over personnel decisions. Lenin addressed such questions in 1923, in his articles "How We Should Reorganize the Workers' and Peasants' Inspectorate" and "Better Fewer but Better". In these, Lenin wrote of his plan to turn the combined meetings of the Central Committee and the Control Commission into the party's "parliament". The combined meetings of these two would hold the Politburo responsible, while at the same time guard the Politburo from factionalism. Admitting that organizational barriers may be inadequate to safeguard the party from one-man dictatorship, Lenin recognized the importance of individuals. His testament tried to solve this crisis by reducing both Stalin's and Leon Trotsky's powers.

Although some of his contemporaries accused Lenin of creating a one-man dictatorship within the party, Lenin countered, stating that he, like any other, could only implement policies by persuading the party. This happened on several occasions, such as in 1917 when he threatened to leave the party if it did not go along with the October Revolution, when he persuaded the party to sign the Treaty of Brest-Litovsk, or with the introduction of the New Economic Policy (NEP). Lenin, a noted factionalist before the Bolshevik seizure of power, supported the promotion of people he had previously clashed with on important issues to the Politburo; Trotsky and Lenin had had several years of violent polemics between them, while Grigori Zinoviev and Lev Kamenev both opposed the Central Committee resolution that initiated the October Revolution.

From 1917 to the mid-1920s, congresses were held annually, the Central Committee was convened at least once a month and the Politburo met once a week. With Joseph Stalin's consolidation of power, the frequency of formal meetings declined. By the mid-1930s, the Central Committee met only once a month, and the Politburo convened at most once every third week. The Politburo was established, and worked within the framework of democratic centralism (that is a system in which higher bodies are responsible to lower bodies and where every member is subordinate to party decisions). The nature of democratic centralism had changed by 1929, and freedom of expression, which had been previously tolerated within the party, was replaced with monolithic unity. This was achieved with Stalin's defeat of rival factions such as the Left Opposition and the Right Opposition. It is generally believed that under Stalin the Politburo's powers were reduced compared to the General Secretary.

Stalin defeated the Left Opposition led by Trotsky by allying himself with the rightists within the Politburo; Nikolai Bukharin, Aleksey Rykov, and Mikhail Tomsky. After defeating the Left Opposition, Stalin began attacking the rightists (referred to as the Right Opposition) through his supporters in the Politburo, the Central Committee, and the Control Commission. Stalin and his companion supported an undemocratic interpretation of Lenin's What Is to Be Done?. Throughout the late-1920s, Politburo member Lazar Kaganovich (a Stalin ally), wrote and campaigned for a party organisational by-law which reduced intra-party democracy in favour of hierarchy and centralism. With the defeat of the other factions, these interpretations became party law. To strengthen the system of centralised decision-making, Stalin appointed his allies to high offices outside the Politburo. For instance, Vyacheslav Molotov succeeded Rykov as Chairman of the Council of People's Commissars in 1930, to reduce the chance of another independent locus of centralised power forming form which could threaten Stalin and the Politburo, Secretariat, and Orgburo.

During this period, the office of the General Secretary became paramount. The Politburo, which was nominally responsible to the Central Committee and the Party Congress, became responsible to the General Secretary. The General Secretary, the formal head of the Secretariat and the Orgburo, "came to exercise enormous weight in decision-making." The Secretariat and Orgburo were responsible for personnel appointments in the whole party, and so were used as a machine by Stalin and his allies to promote like-minded individuals. Molotov and Kaganovich played a key role in strengthening the role of the Secretariat and the Orgburo in Party affairs.

=== Stalin years: 1934–1953 ===
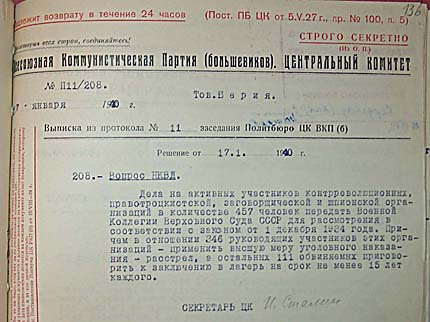
Excerpt of protocol of Politburo meeting of 17 January 1940 noting the decision to put 457 persons on trial and to execute 346 of them with the rest (111) being sent to the Gulags

The 17th Politburo was elected at the 1st Plenary Session of the 17th Central Committee, in the aftermath of the 17th Congress. Outwardly, the Politburo remained united, but on 4 February Grigory Ordzhonikidze, the People's Commissar for Heavy Industry, refused to acknowledge Stalin's projected economic growth targets, claiming that the majority in the Politburo supported his position. Sergey Kirov, who had turned down an offer to take Stalin's place as General Secretary before the 17th Congress, opposed many of Stalin's repressive policies, and tried throughout 1934 to moderate them. Several scholars have viewed Ordzhonikidze's and Kirov's outspokenness as the rise of a moderate Stalinist faction with the party. On 1 December 1934, Kirov was shot dead – whether he was the victim of a lone assailant or killed on Stalin's orders remains unknown. Not long after, on 21 January 1935, Valerian Kuybyshev died of natural causes, and a month later, Anastas Mikoyan and Vlas Chubar were elected Politburo full members. Andrei Zhdanov, the First Secretary of the Leningrad City Committee and member of the Secretariat, and Robert Eikhe, the First Secretary of the Siberian and West-Siberian District Committee, were elected Politburo candidate members.

1936 signaled the beginning of the Great Purge, a nationwide purge of what Stalin deemed as anti-socialist elements. The first victims of the purge were members and leaders of economic organizations. Not everyone in the Politburo agreed with the purges, or the scope of them. Ordzhonikidze ridiculed the purge, and tried to save officials working in the People's Commissariat for Heavy Industry. Stalin expected that Ordzhonikidze would support the purges, at least officially, but instead he wrote a speech condemning them. On 18 February 1937, Ordzhonikidze was found dead in his house, having killed himself. At the Central Committee plenum in February 1937, Stalin, Molotov, Zhdanov and Nikolai Yezhov began accusing leading officials of anti-socialist behavior, but they met opposition. Pavel Postyshev, a Politburo candidate member and First Secretary of the Ukrainian Communist Branch, in response to them accusing a member of the Ukrainian Central Committee of being anti-socialist said; "I don't believe it." When Yezhov proposed killing Bukharin and Rykov, Postyshev along with Stanislav Kosior and Grigory Petrovsky, opposed such a measure, proposing instead of handing them over to the courts. Molotov and Kliment Voroshilov, supported a compromise brokered by Stalin, which handed over Bukharin and Rykov to the NKVD. Despite this opposition, Stalin and his closest associates began purging officials nationwide. In May 1937, Jānis Rudzutaks became the first Politburo member to be purged. In 1938, four other Politburo members were purged; Chubar, who personally telephoned Stalin crying trying to assure his innocence, Kosior, who confessed for anti-socialist crimes after his daughter was raped in front of him, Postyshev and Eikhe. Petrovsky in contrast, was rather lucky, instead of being purged he was not reelected to the Politburo at the 18th Congress. The purging of Rudzutaks, Eikhe, and Kosior testified to Stalin's growing power; the Politburo were not even notified of the decision. Postyshev was purged because "of too much zeal in persecuting people."

== Duties and responsibilities ==
=== Status ===
The Politburo was the highest organ of the party when the party Congress and the Central Committee were not in session. The Politburo, along with the Secretariat and the Organizational Bureau (Orgburo) until 1952, was one of three permanent bodies of the party. The General Secretary, the party leader, served as ex officio chairman of the Politburo (however, no formal rule stipulated such activity). 28 politburos were elected throughout the existence of the USSR.

=== Decision-making process ===
Arkady Shevchenko, like many Soviet technical experts, once attended the part of a Politburo meeting that touched on his area of expertise, and he often prepared his boss Andrei Gromyko for meetings. He described the working style of the Politburo's weekly meeting during the Brezhnev era as "quiet, orderly, and methodical. Although an agenda is prepared, there is no quorum call or other form of parliamentary procedure." Shevchenko's memoir makes it clear that the tense political struggle that could often occur among Politburo members usually did not take place openly during its meetings, but rather behind the backs of one's rivals. In practice, Soviet Leninism's democratic centralism often followed a style of unanimous consent rather than majority vote. This style of consensus decision-making had roots not only in the era of the Great Terror, also known as the Yezhovshchina, but also in Brezhnev's carefully cultivated culture of collective decision-making. Shevchenko said, "While the Politburo considered the item for which I was responsible, I sat with Kuznetsov, Kornienko, and [Vasily] Makarov, behind Gromyko at the long table in the Kremlin. Brezhnev asked whether all members of the Politburo had received the draft U.S.-Soviet documents in time and if they had studied them. Most of the members nodded silent assent. 'Can I assume that the draft is approved?' Brezhnev asked. No one spoke. 'The draft is approved,' said Brezhnev after a few more moments of silence. Makarov put his hand on my shoulder, whispering, 'Okay, Arkady, that's it. You can go.'"

Nevertheless, there were times where the General Secretary would override all the other members by making his opinion clear and implying that dissent would not be tolerated. Mikhail Smirtyukov, recalled one such Politburo meeting. While Brezhnev was on vacation, Mikhail Suslov, who hated the idea that in front of the Lenin Mausoleum in Red Square there was a department store (GUM), attempted to turn GUM into an exhibition hall and museum showcasing Soviet and Communist history.

After the decision was drawn up, Brezhnev was immediately reported. When he returned from vacation, before the first meeting of the Politburo he said: "Some idiot here invented a plan to close GUM and open some kind of cabinet of curiosities there." After everyone sat down, he asks: "Well, has the GUM issue been resolved?" Everyone, including Suslov, nodded their heads. The problem was closed once and for all without discussion.

== Members ==
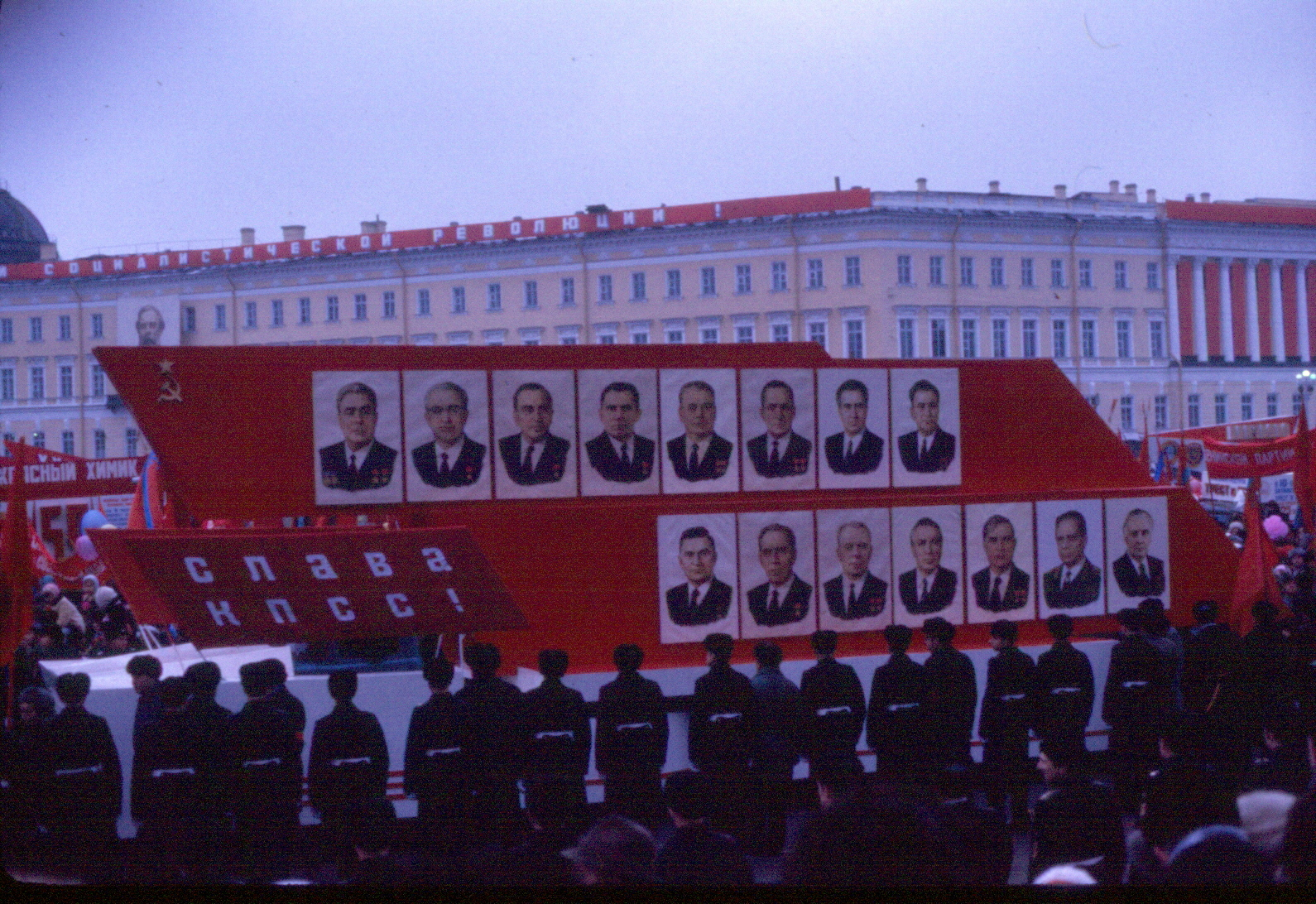
Portraits of Soviet Politburo members at a demonstration in honour of the October Revolution anniversary, November 7, 1976, Leningrad

=== Election ===
To be elected to the Politburo, a member had to serve on the Central Committee. The Central Committee formally elected the Politburo in the aftermath of a party Congress. Members of the Central Committee were given a predetermined list of candidates for the Politburo (having only one candidate for each seat); for this reason, the election of the Politburo was usually passed unanimously. The more power the CPSU General Secretary had, the stronger the chance was that the Politburo membership were passed without serious dissent.

Article 25 of the party Charter, said little to nothing on the actual relationship between the Politburo and the Central Committee. Until 1961, Article 25 stated (with several changes) that the Central Committee "forms" or "organizes" the Politburo. It was not until 1961, under Nikita Khrushchev, that the party Charter was amended; stating that the Politburo was appointed through "secret elections". The amended party Charter stated that at least one-third of the Politburo (as well as the Central Committee) had to step down at each election to the Politburo, and that no members could be elected for more than three terms. The initiator of these changes, Khrushchev, the CPSU General Secretary, had served in the Politburo for 22 years. Instead of stepping down, Khrushchev made a rule which stated that members "who enjoyed great authority and possessed exceptional ability" could serve more than three terms, if they received more than 75 percent approval votes from the Central Committee, upon elections. These amendments were removed from the party Charter under Leonid Brezhnev, and Article 25 now stated; "In the election of all party organs, from the primary party organization to the Central Committee of the CPSU, the principle of systematic replacement of personnel and the continuity of leadership is to be observed." The Brezhnev period saw, in complete contrast to Khrushchev's amendment, the greatest continuity in the Politburo in its history. Article 25 of the Charter remained unchanged under the successive leadership of Yuri Andropov, Konstantin Chernenko and Mikhail Gorbachev.

Between 1919 and 1990, 42 members who served as candidate members were not promoted to full member status of the Politburo. Similarly, 32 full members of the Politburo never served as candidate members. Six members who had served as full members were demoted to candidate status during the Politburo's existence.

=== Posts ===
Serving in the Politburo was a part-time function, and members served concurrently in either the party, state, trade union, security or military administrations (or all of them concurrently). Until the 1950s, most members served in state positions, but this changed at the 20th Congress (held in 1956) when 47% of Politburo members served in the central party apparatus while another 47% served in the state administration. From the 20th Congress until the 28th Congress, the share of Politburo members serving in the central party apparatus increased, while those serving in the state administration declined. The majority of Politburo members had leading central posts; the highest share of republican officials serving in the Politburo came at the 22nd Congress (held in 1961) when 50 percent of members held offices at the republican-level.

Security officials had historically had a low-profile on the Politburo. From 1953 until 1973, no officials representing the security sector served in the Politburo as full members; the last two being Lavrentiy Beria and Semyon Ignatiev. This tradition was put to an end with the elevation of Yuri Andropov, the KGB Chairman, to full membership (having served as a candidate member since 1967). Alexander Shelepin had served as KGB Chairman, but was elected to the Politburo through his work in the Komsomol, while Eduard Shevardnadze, who had served as the Georgian Minister of Internal Affairs until 1972, became a candidate member of the Politburo through his work as First Secretary of the Georgian Communist Party. Similarly in 1973, the Minister of Defense Andrei Grechko was appointed to the Politburo. However, unlike the security sector, the military sector had had representatives in the Politburo since the 8th Politburo (in 1919). Defense ministers who had served in the Politburo are Leon Trotsky, Mikhail Frunze, Kliment Voroshilov, Nikolai Bulganin, Georgy Zhukov and Dmitry Ustinov among others. Similarly, several leading Politburo officials had participated in either the Russian Revolution, the Russian Civil War or World War II.

=== Ethnicity, age and sex ===
Ethnic Slavs dominated the Politburo from its establishment in 1919. This is not surprising, since the three most populous republics within the Soviet Union were ethnic Slavic; Byelorussia, Ukraine and Russia. From 1919 until 1991, 89 members of the Politburo were Russians (which makes up 68 percent). In distant second were Ukrainians, who had 11 members in the Politburo, making up 8 percent. In third place are both ethnic Jews and Georgians, who had 4 members respectively, making up 3 percent. For comparison, according to the population censuses, during these years the Soviet Union had a composition of between 51% (in 1989) and 58% (in 1939) Russian, between 15% (in 1989) and 21% (in 1926) Ukrainian, between 1.2% (in 1926) and 1.4% (in 1989) Georgian, and between 0.5% (in 1989) and 1.8% (in 1926) Jewish. In general, in the first half of the Politburo's existence, there was a higher ethnic representation than the second half. It was not until the 28th Politburo that every republic had a representative at the Politburo. The Politburo never tried to fix the ethnic imbalance within the Politburo. Instead, the Soviet Union at the central level was mostly ruled by Russians.

Despite the ideological rhetoric about equality between the sexes, the Politburo came to be composed largely of men. Only four women ever served in the Politburo; Elena Stasova, Yekaterina Furtseva, Alexandra Biryukova and Galina Semenova. Furtseva, Biryukova and Semenova reached the Politburo under the leadership of reformist party leaders; Nikita Khrushchev and Mikhail Gorbachev.

The average age of the Politburo was 39 in 1919, and the Politburo continued to age more-or-less consistently until 1985. The reason for this being that the Central Committee treated Politburo replenishment as the responsibility of the Politburo itself. Politburo members usually picked successors who were around the same age, the result being the establishment of the gerontocracy of the Brezhnev Era. While the age steadily crept up during Khrushchev's leadership, members were replaced; for instance, 70 percent of the members elected to the Politburo in 1956 lost their seats in 1961. In contrast, all the Politburo members elected in 1966 were reelected in 1971. Even more worrisome, 12 out of 19 members elected in 1966 were reelected in 1981. By the time of Brezhnev's death in 1982, the median age of the politburo was 70. This age development was finally put to a halt under Gorbachev. From 1985 onwards, the age of Politburo members steadily declined.

=== Origin and education ===
Fifty-nine percent of Politburo members (both candidate and full) were of rural origins, while 41 percent were urban. The first members of the Politburo were predominantly from urban areas. For instance, on the 9th Politburo, two out of eight (Trotsky and Mikhail Kalinin) were born in rural areas. From the 1930s onwards, the majority of Politburo members had a father who worked either as a peasant or as a worker. This is strange, considering that one would assume a rise in representation of the intelligentsia as the Soviet Union became more advanced. From the 1960s onwards the majority of new members had workers' backgrounds, as expected. What is strange, however, is that from 1975 to 1981, a sudden increase of people of peasant background took place. When looking at first profession, the majority of members had worked as workers, but the majority of them had attended higher education later in their life (the majority of them choosing engineering). 43 percent of Politburo members attained higher education credentials during their life, while in a close second place, 32 percent of members earned an education in technical engineering.

== See also ==
- Lists of members of the Politburo of the Communist Party of the Soviet Union
- Organisation of the Communist Party of the Soviet Union
- Central Committee of the Communist Party of the Soviet Union
- Secretariat
- General Secretary
- Orgburo

== Bibliography ==
- Lowenhardt, John; van Ree, Erik; Ozinga, James (1992). The Rise and Fall of the Soviet Politburo. St Martin's Press. ISBN 0312047843.
- Rees, E.A., ed. (2004). "Introduction" (PDF). The Nature of Stalin's Dictatorship: The Politburo, 1924–1953. Routledge. pp. 1–18. ISBN 1403904014.
- Shevchenko, Arkady (1985). Breaking with Moscow. Knopf. ISBN 978-0394520551. OCLC 11680691.
- Wheatcroft, Stephen G. (2004). "From Team-Stalin to Degenerate Tyranny" (PDF). In Rees, E.A. (ed.). The Nature of Stalin's Dictatorship: The Politburo, 1924–1953. Routledge. pp. 79–107. ISBN 1403904014.
