= 28th Congress of the Communist Party of the Soviet Union =

Final Congress of the Communist Party of the Soviet Union

The 28th Congress of the Communist Party of the Soviet Union (2 July, 1990 – 13 July, 1990) was held in Moscow. It was held a year ahead of the traditional schedule and turned out to be the last congress of the Communist Party of the Soviet Union (CPSU) in the history of the party. Notably, this congress displayed open factionalism: opposing views were championed by the centrist "CPSU Central Committee platform" (supported by Gorbachev), the liberal "Democratic Platform" (which included Boris Yeltsin) and the conservative "Marxist Platform".

- Mikhail Gorbachev was reelected General Secretary with a 3411 to 1116 vote. Gorbachev's challenger, Teimuraz Avaliani, received 501 votes with 4020 opposing.
- Vladimir Ivashko was elected deputy general secretary, defeating Yegor Ligachyov.
- A new Party Statute was passed, which formalized the end of the monopoly of power of the CPSU announced at the previous Party Congress.
- The New Union Treaty project was proposed by Gorbachev.
- Boris Yeltsin and some others resigned from the party after the "Democratic Platform" group failed to advance the transition to a parliamentary structure of the organization, while the "Marxist Platform" failed to oppose Gorbachev's reforms of "healing socialism by capitalism".
- The congress failed to issue the next Program, and issued only a Program Declaration.

The first Plenum of the new 28th Central Committee was held 13-14 July, and with the exception of Gorbachev, a completely new 28th Politburo was elected.

Various organizations claiming to be the successor of the CPSU have held congresses continuing the numbering established by the CPSU and its predecessors. The Communist Party of the Soviet Union (1992) held its so-called 29th Restorative CPSU Congress in 1992 declaring the CPSU reinstated. Similarly, the Union of Communist Parties — Communist Party of the Soviet Union, established in 1993, has also held congresses starting from 29th, the most recent being the 33rd Congress.
