= Central Committee of the 26th Congress of the Communist Party of the Soviet Union =

Soviet government 1981–1986

The Central Committee of the 26th Congress of the Communist Party of the Soviet Union was in session from 1981 until 1986. It elected, at its 1st Plenary Session, the 26th Politburo, the 26th Secretariat and the 26th Party Control Committee of the Communist Party of the Soviet Union.

== Plenums ==
The Central Committee was not a permanent institution. It convened plenary sessions. 15 CC plenary sessions were held between the 26th Congress and the 27th Congress. When the CC was not in session, decision-making power was vested in the internal bodies of the CC itself; that is, the Politburo and the Secretariat. None of these bodies were permanent either; typically they convened several times a month.

Plenary sessions of the Central Committee
Plenum	Date	Length
1st Plenary Session	3 March 1981	1 day
2nd Plenary Session	16 November 1981	1 day
3rd Plenary Session	24 May 1982	1 day
4th Plenary Session	12 November 1982	1 day
5th Plenary Session	22 November 1982	1 day
6th Plenary Session	14–15 June 1983	2 days
7th Plenary Session	26–27 December 1983	2 days
8th Plenary Session	13 February 1984	1 day
9th Plenary Session	10 April 1984	1 day
10th Plenary Session	23 October 1984	1 day
11th Plenary Session	11 March 1985	1 day
12th Plenary Session	23 April 1985	1 day
13th Plenary Session	1 July 1985	1 day
14th Plenary Session	15 October 1985	1 day
15th Plenary Session	18 February 1986	1 day

== Composition ==
=== Members ===
Members of the Central Committee of the 26th Congress of the Communist Party of the Soviet Union
Name	Cyrillic	25th CC	27th CC	Birth	Death	PM	Ethnicity	Gender
Pyotr Abrasimov	Петр Абрасимов	Old	Not	1912	2009	1940	Russian	Male
Sergey Afanasyev	Серге́й Афана́сьев	Old	Reelected	1918	2001	1943	Russian	Male
Viktor Afanasyev	Ви́ктор Афана́сьев	Old	Reelected	1922	1994	1943	Russian	Male
Sergey Akhromeyev	Серге́й Ахроме́ев	Promoted	Reelected	1923	1991	1943	Russian	Male
Aleksandr Aksyonov	Алекса́ндр Аксёнов	Old	Reelected	1924	2009	1945	Belarusian	Male
Andrey Aleksandrov-Agentov	Андре́й Алекса́ндров-Аге́нтов	Candidate	Not	1918	1993	1948	Russian	Male
Pyotr Alekseyev	Пётр Алексеев	Old	Not	1913	1999	1940	Russian	Male
Anatoly Alexandrov	Анатолий Александров	Old	Reelected	1903	1994	1962	Ukrainian	Male
Heydar Aliyev	Гейда́р Али́ев	Old	Reelected	1923	2003	1945	Azerbaijani	Male
Vladimir Alkhimov	Владимир Алхимов	Promoted	Not	1919	1993	1942	Russian	Male
Alexander Altunin	Алекса́ндр Алту́нин	Old	Reelected	1921	1989	1943	Russian	Male
Yuri Andropov	Юрий Андропов	Old	Died	1914	1984	1939	Russian	Male
Aleksey Antonov	Алексей Антонов	Old	Reelected	1912	2010	1940	Russian	Male
Sergey Antonov	Серге́й Анто́нов	Old	Not	1911	1987	1937	Russian	Male
Georgy Arbatov	Гео́ргий Арба́тов	Candidate	Reelected	1923	2010	1943	Russian	Male
Boris Aristov	Борис Аристов	Old	Reelected	1925	2018	1945	Russian	Male
Ivan Arkhipov	Иван Архипов	Old	Reelected	1907	1998	1928	Russian	Male
Bayken Ashimov	Асанбай Аскаров	Old	Not	1917	2010	1944	Kazakh	Male
Asanbay Askarov	Байкен Ашимов	Old	Not	1922	2001	1940	Kazakh	Male
Erkin Auelbekov	Еркин Ауельбеков	Old	Reelected	1930	1999	1940	Kazakh	Male
Kenes Aukhadiyev	Кенес Аухадиев	New	Not	1938	2022	1962	Kazakh	Male
Stepan Avramenko	Степан Авраменко	Old	Not	1918	2010	1950	Ukrainian	Male
Ivan Bagramyan	Иван Баграмян	Old	Died	1897	1982	1941	Armenian	Male
Nikolai Baibakov	Николай Байбаков	Old	Reelected	1911	2008	1939	Russian	Male
Vyacheslav Bakhirev	Вячеслав Бахирев	Old	Reelected	1916	1991	1951	Russian	Male
Boris Bakin	Борис Бакин	Old	Reelected	1913	1992	1941	Russian	Male
Anatoly Balandin	Анато́лий Бала́ндин	New	Reelected	1927	2014	1954	Russian	Male
Yuri Balandin	Юрий Баландин	Old	Reelected	1925	2004	1944	Russian	Male
Boris Balmont	Борис Бальмонт	Promoted	Reelected	1927	2022	1956	Russian	Male
Nikolai Bannikov	Никола́й Ба́нников	Old	Not	1914	2004	1937	Russian	Male
Pavel Batitsky	Па́вел Бати́цкий	Old	Died	1910	1984	1938	Ukrainian	Male
Vladimir Bazovsky	Владимир Базовский	Old	Reelected	1917	1993	1942	Russian	Male
Khasan Bekturganov	Хасан Бектурганов	Old	Not	1922	1987	1942	Kazakh	Male
Konstantin Belyak	Константи́н Беля́к	Old	Not	1916	1997	1942	Russian	Male
Anatoly Berozin	Анатолий Березин	Old	Not	1931	1998	1954	Mordvin	Male
Boris Beshchev	Борис Бещев	Old	Died	1903	1981	1927	Russian	Male
Ivan Bespalov	Иван Беспалов	Old	Not	1911	2011	1944	Russian	Male
Aleksandra Biryukova	Александра Бирюкова	Old	Reelected	1929	2008	1956	Russian	Female
Ivan Bodiul	Иван Бодюл	Old	Not	1918	2013	1940	Ukrainian	Male
Klavdy Bogolyubov	Клавдий Боголюбов	New	Not	1909	1996	1938	Russian	Male
Gennady Bogomyakov	Генна́дий Богомя́ков	New	Reelected	1930	2020	1959	Russian	Male
Ivan Bondarenko	Иван Бондаренко	Old	Not	1926	2009	1950	Ukrainian	Male
Vasily Borisenkov	Василий Борисенков	Candidate	Reelected	1927	2005	1946	Russian	Male
Andrei Borodin	Андрей Бородин	Old	Died	1912	1984	1941	Russian	Male
Leonid Borodin	Леонид Бородин	Old	Reelected	1923	2008	1948	Russian	Male
Pavel Borodin	Павел Бородин	Old	Not	1911	1998	1932	Russian	Male
Oleksandr Botvin	Александр Ботвин	Old	Not	1918	1998	1943	Ukrainian	Male
Boris Bratchenko	Бори́с Бра́тченко	Old	Not	1912	2004	1940	Russian	Male
Konstantin Brekhov	Константи́н Бре́хов	Old	Not	1907	1994	1931	Russian	Male
Leonid Brezhnev	Леонид Брежнев	Old	Died	1906	1982	1931	Russian	Male
Vladimir Brovikov	Владимир Бровиков	New	Reelected	1931	1992	1958	Belarusian	Male
Boris Bugayev	Борис Бугаев	Old	Reelected	1923	2007	1942	Ukrainian	Male
Aleksandr Bulgakov	Александр Булгаков	Old	Not	1907	1996	1937	Ukrainian	Male
Yevgeniy Chazov	Евгений Чазов	Promoted	Reelected	1929	2021	1962	Russian	Male
Viktor Chebrikov	Виктор Че́бриков	Candidate	Reelected	1923	1999	1950	Ukrainian	Male
Vasily Cherdintsev	Василий Чердинцев	Promoted	Reelected	1927	2018	1956	Russian	Male
Konstantin Chernenko	Константин Черненко	Old	Died	1911	1985	1931	Ukrainian	Male
Stepan Chervonenko	Степан Червоненко	Old	Reelected	1915	2003	1940	Ukrainian	Male
Vladimir Chicherov	Влади́мир Чи́черов	Old	Not	1933	1996	1964	Russian	Male
Gavrii Chiryayev	Гавриил Чиряев	Old	Died	1925	1985	1944	Yakut	Male
Aleksey Chornyy	Алексей Чёрный	Old	Reelected	1921	2002	1931	Ukrainian	Male
Vasily Chuikov	Васи́лий Чуйко́в	Old	Died	1900	1982	1919	Russian	Male
Raisa Dementyeva	Раиса Дементьева	Old	Not	1925	2022	1948	Russian	Female
Pyotr Demichev	Пётр Де́мичев	Old	Reelected	1917	2010	1939	Russian	Male
Vasily Demidenko	Василий Демиденко	Old	Reelected	1930	1998	1955	Ukrainian	Male
Karen Demirchyan	Каре́н Демирчя́н	Old	Reelected	1932	1999	1955	Armenian	Male
Viktor Dobrik	Виктор До́брик	Old	Reelected	1927	2008	1954	Ukrainian	Male
Anatoly Dobrynin	Анато́лий Добры́нин	Old	Reelected	1919	2010	1945	Russian	Male
Vladimir Dolgikh	Владимир Долгих	Old	Reelected	1924	2020	1942	Russian	Male
Vasily Drozdenko	Васи́лий Дрозде́нко	Old	Died	1924	1982	1944	Ukrainian	Male
Anatoly Drygin	Анатолий Дрыгин	Old	Not	1914	1990	1940	Russian	Male
Veniamin Dymshits	Вениамин Дымшиц	Old	Not	1910	1993	1937	Ukrainian	Male
Pavel Fedirko	Па́вел Феди́рко	Old	Reelected	1932	2019	1957	Russian	Male
Viktor Fedorov	Ви́ктор Фёдоров	Old	Not	1912	1990	1939	Russian	Male
Pyotr Fedoseyev	Петр Федосеев	Old	Reelected	1908	1990	1939	Russian	Male
Aleksandr Filatov	Александр Филатов	Candidate	Reelected	1922	2016	1947	Russian	Male
Pavel Finogenov	Па́вел Финоге́нов	Candidate	Reelected	1919	2004	1943	Russian	Male
Leonid Florentyev	Леонид Флорентьев	Old	Not	1911	2003	1939	Russian	Male
Gennady Fomin	Геннадий Фомин	Candidate	Not	1936	Alive	1963	Russian	Male
Muhammetnazar Gapurov	Мухамедназар Гапуров	Old	Not	1912	2004	1944	Turkmen	Male
Vasily Garbuzov	Василий Гарбузов	Old	Died	1911	1985	1939	Russian	Male
Valentin Glushko	Валенти́н Глушко́	Old	Reelected	1908	1989	1956	Ukrainian	Male
Nikolai Goldin	Николай Голдин	Old	Not	1910	2001	1929	Russian	Male
Valentina Golubeva	Валентина Голубева	New	Reelected	1949	Alive	1977	Russian	Female
Boris Goncharenko	Николай Голдин	Old	Reelected	1927	1997	1948	Ukrainian	Male
Grigory Gorban	Григорий Горбань	Old	Not	1932	2000	1959	Ukrainian	Male
Mikhail Gorbachev	Михаил Горбачёв	Old	Reelected	1931	2022	1952	Russian	Male
Leonid Gorshkov	Леонид Горшков	Old	Reelected	1930	1994	1952	Russian	Male
Sergey Gorshkov	Серге́й Горшков	Old	Reelected	1910	1988	1942	Russian	Male
Boris Gostev	Бори́с Го́стев	Candidate	Reelected	1927	2015	1954	Russian	Male
Vladimir Govorov	Владимир Говоров	Candidate	Reelected	1924	2006	1946	Russian	Male
Leonid Grekov	Леонид Греков	Old	Not	1928	2004	1949	Russian	Male
Anatoly Gribkov	Анато́лий Грибко́в	Candidate	Reelected	1919	2008	1943	Russian	Male
Viktor Grishin	Ви́ктор Гри́шин	Old	Not	1914	1992	1939	Russian	Male
Petras Griškevičius	Пя́трас Гришкя́вичюс	Old	Reelected	1924	1987	1945	Lithuanian	Male
Andrei Gromyko	Андрей Громыко	Old	Reelected	1909	1989	1931	Belarusian	Male
Semion Grossu	Семён Гроссу	New	Reelected	1934	Alive	1961	Moldovan	Male
Pyotr Grushin	Пётр Гру́шин	Old	Not	1906	1993	1931	Russian	Male
Aleksandr Gudkov	Александр Гудков	Old	Reelected	1930	1992	1958	Russian	Male
Vladimir Gusev	Владимир Гусев	New	Reelected	1932	2022	1963	Russian	Male
Ivan Gustov	Иван Густов	Old	Reelected	1911	1996	1932	Russian	Male
Timofey Guzhenko	Тимофей Гуженко	Old	Reelected	1918	2008	1941	Russian	Male
Vadim Ignatov	Вадим Игнатов	Old	Reelected	1931	1998	1953	Russian	Male
Sattar Imashev	Саттар Имашев	New	Died	1925	1984	1945	Kazakh	Male
Nikolay Inozemtsev	Никола́й Инозе́мцев	Candidate	Died	1921	1982	1943	Russian	Male
Vasily Isayev	Василий Исаев	Old	Not	1917	2008	1939	Russian	Male
Yevgeny Ivanovsky	Евге́ний Ивано́вский	Old	Reelected	1918	1991	1941	Belarusian	Male
Yevgeny Kachalovsky	Евгений Качаловский	New	Reelected	1926	2011	1947	Ukrainian	Male
Johannes Käbin	Йоха́ннес Кэ́бин	Old	Not	1905	1999	1927	Estonian	Male
Dmitry Kachin	Дмитрий Качин	Candidate	Reelected	1929	2025	1953	Russian	Male
Boris Kachura	Борис Качура	Old	Reelected	1930	2007	1957	Ukrainian	Male
Andrey Kandrenkov	Андре́й Кандрёнков	Old	Not	1915	1989	1939	Russian	Male
Ivan Kapitonov	Иван Капитонов	Old	Not	1915	2002	1939	Russian	Male
Georgy Karavayev	Георгий Караваев	Old	Not	1913	1994	1940	Russian	Male
Vladimir Karlov	Влади́мир Ка́рлов	Old	Reelected	1914	1994	1940	Russian	Male
Yevdokya Karpova	Марина Журавлёва	Old	Reelected	1923	2000	1952	Russian	Female
Konstantin Katushev	Константин Катушев	Old	Reelected	1927	2010	1952	Russian	Male
Vasily Kavun	Василий Кавун	Old	Reelected	1928	2009	1954	Ukrainian	Male
Leonid Kazakov	Леонид Казаков	New	Reelected	1951	Alive	1974	Russian	Male
Ivan Kazanets	Иван Казанец	Old	Not	1918	2013	1944	Ukrainian	Male
Stepan Khitrov	Степан Хитров	Old	Not	1910	1999	1932	Russian	Male
Aleksandr Khomyakov	Александр Хомяков	New	Reelected	1932	2014	1958	Russian	Male
Yuri Khristoradnov	Юрий Христораднов	Old	Reelected	1929	2018	1951	Russian	Male
Narmakhonmadi Khudayberdyyev	Нармахонмади Худайбердыев	Old	Not	1928	2011	1962	Uzbek	Male
Andrei Kirilenko	Андре́й Кириле́нко	Old	Not	1906	1990	1930	Ukrainian	Male
Nikolai Kirichenko	Николай Кириченко	Old	Not	1923	1986	1944	Ukrainian	Male
Ivan Kiselov	Иван Киселёв	Old	Not	1917	2004	1944	Russian	Male
Tikhon Kiselyov	Ти́хон Киселёв	Old	Died	1917	1983	1940	Belarusian	Male
Mikhail Klepikov	Михаил Клепиков	Old	Not	1927	1999	1956	Russian	Male
Ivan Klimenko	Иван Клименко	Old	Reelected	1921	2006	1945	Russian	Male
Yevgeny Klimchenko	Климченко Иванович	Old	Not	1924	1989	1944	Belarusian	Male
Vladimir Klyuyev	Владимир Клюев	Old	Reelected	1924	1998	1949	Ukrainian	Male
Filipp Knyazev	Фили́пп Кня́зев	Old	Not	1916	1994	1940	Russian	Male
Vyacheslav Kochemasov	Вячеслав Кочемасов	Promoted	Reelected	1918	1998	1944	Russian	Male
Gennady Kolbin	Геннадий Колбин	Old	Reelected	1927	1998	1954	Russian	Male
Alexander Koldunov	Александр Колдунов	New	Reelected	1923	1992	1944	Russian	Male
Aleksandr Kolesnikov	Александр Колесников	Candidate	Reelected	1930	2008	1966	Ukrainian	Male
Nikolay Konovalov	Никола́й Конова́лов	Old	Not	1907	1993	1929	Russian	Male
Boris Konoplov	Борис Коноплёв	Old	Not	1919	2008	1945	Russian	Male
Vasily Konotop	Василий Конотоп	Old	Not	1916	1995	1944	Ukrainian	Male
Georgy Korniyenko	Гео́ргий Корние́нко	New	Reelected	1925	2006	1947	Ukrainian	Male
Anatoly Korolyov	Анатолий Королёв	New	Reelected	1936	Alive	1967	Russian	Male
Richard Kosolapov	Ричард Косолапов	Candidate	Not	1930	2020	1957	Russian	Male
Leonid Kostandov	Леони́д Коста́ндов	Old	Died	1915	1984	1942	Armenian	Male
Vitaly Kostin	Виталий Костин	Promoted	Reelected	1938	2009	1961	Russian	Male
Alexander Kovalenko	Александр Коваленко	Old	Not	1909	1987	1931	Ukrainian	Male
Nikolay Kozlov	Николай Козлов	Old	Not	1925	2001	1946	Russian	Male
Viktor Krotov	Виктор Кротов	Candidate	Not	1912	1986	1956	Russian	Male
Nikolay Kruchina	Николай Кручина	Old	Reelected	1928	1991	1949	Russian	Male
Zinaida Kruglova	Зинаи́да Кругло́ва	Old	Reelected	1923	1995	1944	Russian	Female
Ivan Kudinov	Иван Кудинов	Candidate	Not	1922	1990	1946	Russian	Male
Leonid Kulichenko	Леонид Куличенко	Old	Not	1913	1990	1940	Russian	Male
Fyodor Kulikov	Фёдор Куликов	New	Reelected	1925	2015	1949	Russian	Male
Viktor Kulikov	Виктор Куликов	Old	Reelected	1921	2013	1942	Russian	Male
Dinmukhamed Kunaev	Дінмұхаммед Қонаев	Old	Reelected	1912	1993	1939	Kazakh	Male
Semyon Kurkotkin	Семё́н Курко́ткин	Old	Reelected	1917	1990	1940	Russian	Male
Pavel Kutakhov	Павел Кутахов	Old	Died	1914	1984	1942	Russian	Male
Ivan Kuznetsov	Иван Кузнецов	New	Not	1928	2000	1956	Russian	Male
Vasily Kuznetsov	Василий Кузнецов	Old	Reelected	1901	1990	1927	Russian	Male
Sergey Lapin	Серге́й Лапин	Old	Not	1912	1990	1939	Russian	Male
Voldemar Lein	Вольдемар Леин	Old	Not	1920	1987	1946	Russian	Male
Pavel Leonov	Павел Леонов	Old	Not	1918	1992	1944	Russian	Male
Oleksandr Liashko	Алекса́ндр Ляшко́	Old	Reelected	1915	2002	1942	Ukrainian	Male
Yegor Ligachyov	Егор Лигачёв	Old	Reelected	1920	2021	1944	Russian	Male
Viktor Lomakin	Виктор Ломакин	Old	Reelected	1926	2012	1953	Russian	Male
Pyotr Lomako	Пётр Лома́ко	Old	Reelected	1904	1990	1925	Russian	Male
Vladimir Lomonosov	Владимир Ломоносов	Old	Reelected	1928	1999	1950	Russian	Male
Fodor Loshchenkov	Фодор Лощенков	Old	Reelected	1915	2009	1943	Russian	Male
Pyotr Lushev	Пётр Лу́шев	New	Reelected	1923	1997	1951	Russian	Male
Lidia Lykova	Лидия Лыкова	Old	Not	1913	2016	1938	Russian	Female
Viktor Makarenko	Ви́ктор Мака́ренко	Promoted	Reelected	1931	2007	1960	Ukrainian	Male
Valentin Makeyev	Валентин Макеев	Old	Not	1930	1999	1956	Russian	Male
Viktor Makeyev	Ви́ктор Маке́ев	Old	Died	1924	1985	1942	Russian	Male
Viktor Maltsev	Виктор Мальцев	Old	Reelected	1917	2003	1945	Russian	Male
Sergey Manyakin	Сергей Манякин	Old	Reelected	1923	2010	1945	Russian	Male
Gury Marchuk	Гурий Марчук	Candidate	Reelected	1925	2013	1947	Russian	Male
Valery Marisov	Вале́рий Ма́рисов	Old	Not	1915	1992	1940	Russian	Male
Georgy Markov	Гео́ргий Ма́рков	Old	Reelected	1911	1991	1946	Russian	Male
Nikolai Martynov	Николай Мартынов	New	Not	1910	1998	1932	Russian	Male
Nikolay Maslennikov	Николай Масленников	Old	Reelected	1921	2013	1951	Russian	Male
Sergey Medunov	Серге́й Медуно́в	Old	Removed	1915	1999	1942	Russian	Male
Fodor Meshkov	Фёдор Мешков	Old	Not	1915	1987	1987	Russian	Male
Valentin Mesyats	Валентин Месяц	Old	Reelected	1928	2019	1955	Russian	Male
Vladimir Mikulich	Владимир Микулич	Candidate	Not	1920	2000	1943	Belarusian	Male
Oleg Miroshkhin	Оле́г Миро́шхин	New	Reelected	1928	Alive	1959	Russian	Male
Andrey Modogoyev	Андрей Модогоев	Old	Not	1915	1989	1940	Buryat	Male
Fedir Morhun	Фёдор Моргу́н	Old	Reelected	1924	2008	1952	Ukrainian	Male
Ivan Morozov	Иван Морозов	Old	Reelected	1924	1987	1943	Russian	Male
Kirill Moskalenko	Кирилл Москаленко	Old	Died	1902	1985	1926	Ukrainian	Male
Ivan Mozgovoy	Ива́н Мозгово́й	New	Reelected	1927	2005	1940	Ukrainian	Male
Vsevolod Murakhovsky	Евгений Муравьёв	New	Reelected	1926	2017	1946	Ukrainian	Male
Yevgeny Muravyov	Евгений Муравьёв	New	Reelected	1929	1998	1952	Russian	Male
Mirzamakhmud Musakhanov	Мирзамахмуд Мусаханов	Old	Not	1912	1995	1943	Uzbek	Male
Rashid Musin	Рашид Мусин	New	Died	1927	1982	1952	Tatar	Male
Vladislav Mysnichenko	Владислав Мысниченко	New	Reelected	1929	2019	1955	Ukrainian	Male
Pyotr Neporozhny	Пётр Непорожний	Old	Not	1910	1999	1940	Ukrainian	Male
Viktor Nikonov	Виктор Никонов	Old	Reelected	1929	1993	1954	Russian	Male
Ignaty Novikov	Игнатий Новиков	Old	Not	1906	1993	1926	Ukrainian	Male
Ziya Nuriyev	Зия Нуриев	Old	Not	1915	2012	1939	Bashkir	Male
Nikolai Orgakov	Николай Огарков	Old	Reelected	1917	1994	1945	Russian	Male
Vladimir Orlov	Владимир Орлов	Old	Reelected	1921	1999	1948	Russian	Male
Sabit Orujov	Сабит Оруджев	Candidate	Died	1912	1981	1939	Azerbaijani	Male
Boris Pastukhov	Борис Пастухов	Old	Not	1933	2021	1959	Russian	Male
Nikolai Patolichev	Николай Патоличев	Old	Not	1908	1989	1928	Russian	Male
Borys Paton	Бори́с Пато́н	Old	Reelected	1918	2020	1952	Ukrainian	Male
Georgy Pavlov	Гео́ргий Па́влов	Old	Not	1910	1991	1939	Russian	Male
Grigory Pavlov	Григорий Павлов	Old	Not	1913	1994	1940	Russian	Male
Vladimir Pavlov	Влади́мир Па́влов	Old	Reelected	1923	1998	1948	Russian	Male
Ivan Pavlovsky	Ива́н Павло́вский	Old	Not	1909	1999	1939	Ukrainian	Male
Nikolai Pegov	Георгий Павлов	Old	Not	1905	1991	1939	Ukrainian	Male
Arvīds Pelše	А́рвид Пе́льше	Old	Died	1899	1983	1915	Latvian	Male
Nina Pereverzeva	Ни́на Переве́рзева	Promoted	Reelected	1929	2022	1970	Russian	Female
Vasily Petrov	Васи́лий Петро́в	Old	Reelected	1917	2014	1944	Russian	Male
Vladislav Petrov	Владислав Петров	Old	Reelected	1935	2011	1961	Ukrainian	Male
Nikolai Petrovichev	Николай Петровичев	Candidate	Not	1918	2002	1939	Russian	Male
Pyotr Pleshakov	Пётр Плешаков	Old	Reelected	1922	1987	1944	Russian	Male
Ivan Polyakov	Ива́н Поляко́в	Old	Not	1914	2004	1949	Belarusian	Male
Viktor Polyakov	Ви́ктор Поляко́в	Candidate	Reelected	1915	2004	1944	Russian	Male
Boris Ponomarev	Борис Пономарёв	Old	Reelected	1905	1995	1919	Russian	Male
Mikhail Ponomarev	Михаил Пономарёв	Candidate	Reelected	1918	2001	1939	Russian	Male
Boris Popov	Борис Попов	Old	Reelected	1909	1993	1931	Russian	Male
Nikolay Popov	Николай Попов	New	Reelected	1931	2008	1960	Russian	Male
Maria Popova	Мари́я Попо́ва	Old	Not	1928	2021	1959	Russian	Female
Nikolay Priyezzhev	Николай Приезжев	Old	Not	1919	1989	1946	Russian	Male
Ilya Prokopyev	Николай Приезжев	Old	Reelected	1926	2017	1946	Chuvash	Male
Mikhail Prokofyev	Михаил Прокофьев	Old	Not	1910	1999	1941	Russian	Male
Vladimir Promyslov	Владимир Промыслов	Old	Not	1908	1993	1928	Russian	Male
Vasily Prokhorov	Ильич Василий	Old	Not	1906	1989	1928	Russian	Male
Vladimir Ptitsyn	Влади́мир Пти́цын	Candidate	Not	1925	2006	1946	Russian	Male
Oleg Rakhmanin	Олег Рахманин	Candidate	Reelected	1924	2010	1942	Russian	Male
Sharof Rashidov	Шараф Рашидов	Old	Died	1917	1983	1939	Uzbek	Male
Dzhabar Rasulov	Джабар Расулов	Old	Died	1913	1982	1934	Tajik	Male
Alexander Rekunkov	Александр Рекунков	New	Reelected	1920	1996	1940	Russian	Male
Nikolai Rodionov	Никола́й Родио́нов	Old	Not	1915	1999	1944	Russian	Male
Grigory Romanov	Григорий Романов	Old	Not	1923	2008	1944	Russian	Male
Vitālijs Rubenis	Николай Романов	Old	Not	1914	1994	1939	Latvian	Male
Konstantin Rusakov	Константи́н Русако́в	Old	Not	1909	1993	1943	Russian	Male
Anatoly Rybakov	Анатолий Рыбаков	New	Reelected	1927	2012	1961	Russian	Male
Yakov Ryabov	Я́ков Ря́бов	Old	Reelected	1928	2018	1954	Russian	Male
Vasily Rykov	Василий Рыков	Old	Reelected	1918	2011	1943	Russian	Male
Nikolai Ryzhkov	Николай Рыжков	New	Reelected	1929	2024	1956	Russian	Male
Grigory Salmanov	Григо́рий Салма́нов	Comeback	Not	1922	1993	1944	Russian	Male
Ivan Sakhnyuk	Иван Сахнюк	Old	Reelected	1927	Alive	1960	Ukrainian	Male
Sergey Savin	Сергей Савин	Old	Not	1924	1990	1951	Russian	Male
Nikolai Savinkin	Николай Савинкин	Candidate	Reelected	1913	1993	1927	Russian	Male
Valentin Semonov	Валентин Семенов	Old	Reelected	1930	2002	1958	Ukrainian	Male
Ivan Senkin	Иван Сенькин	Old	Died	1915	1986	1940	Karelian	Male
Vitaly Shabanov	Вита́лий Шаба́нов	Promoted	Reelected	1923	1995	1947	Russian	Male
Midkhat Shakirov	Мидха́т Шаки́ров	Old	Reelected	1916	2004	1944	Bashkir	Male
Stepan Shalayev	Степан Шалаев	Promoted	Reelected	1929	2022	1954	Russian	Male
Nikolai Shchelokov	Никола́й Щёлоков	Old	Removed	1910	1984	1931	Russian	Male
Boris Shcherbina	Борис Щербина	Old	Reelected	1919	1990	1939	Ukrainian	Male
Volodymyr Shcherbitsky	Влади́мир Щерби́цкий	Old	Reelected	1918	1990	1948	Ukrainian	Male
Eduard Shevardnadze	Эдуард Шеварднадзе	Old	Reelected	1928	2014	1936	Georgian	Male
Aleksey Shibayev	Алексей Шибаев	Old	Not	1915	1991	1940	Russian	Male
Aleksey Shitikov	Алексе́й Ши́тиков	Old	Not	1912	1993	1939	Russian	Male
Aleksey Shkolnikov	Алексей Шко́льников	Old	Reelected	1914	2003	1940	Russian	Male
Aleksandr Shokin	Алекса́ндр Шо́кин	Old	Not	1909	1988	1936	Russian	Male
Mikhail Sholokhov	Михаил Шолохов	Old	Died	1905	1984	1932	Russian	Male
Ivan Silayev	Ива́н Сила́ев	New	Reelected	1930	2023	1959	Russian	Male
Yevgeny Sizenko	Евгений Сизенко	New	Reelected	1931	2016	1953	Russian	Male
Semon Skachkov	Семён Скачков	Old	Not	1907	1996	1936	Ukrainian	Male
Yefim Slavsky	Ефи́м Сла́вский	Old	Reelected	1898	1991	1918	Russian	Male
Lev Smirnov	Лев Смирно́в	Old	Not	1911	1986	1945	Russian	Male
Leonid Smirnov	Леонид Смирнов	Old	Not	1916	2001	1943	Russian	Male
Mikhail Smirtyukov	Михаи́л Смиртюко́в	New	Reelected	1909	2004	1940	Russian	Male
Ivan Sokolov	Серге́й Соколо́в	New	Died	1928	1982	1952	Ukrainian	Male
Sergey Sokolov	Серге́й Соколо́в	Old	Reelected	1911	2012	1937	Russian	Male
Mikhail Solomentsev	Михаи́л Соло́менцев	Old	Reelected	1913	2008	1940	Russian	Male
Yuri Solovyev	Михаи́л Соло́менцев	Old	Reelected	1925	2011	1955	Russian	Male
Alexander Struyev	Алекса́ндр Стру́ев	Old	Not	1906	1991	1927	Ukrainian	Male
Boris Stukalin	Борис Стукалин	Old	Reelected	1923	2004	1943	Russian	Male
Mikhail Suslov	Михаил Суслов	Old	Died	1902	1982	1921	Russian	Male
Nikolai Suslov	Николай Суслов	Old	Died	1934	1982	1961	Russian	Male
Fikryat Tabeyev	Фикрят Табеев	Old	Reelected	1928	2015	1957	Russian	Male
Nikolai Talyzin	Никола́й Талы́зин	Candidate	Reelected	1929	1991	1960	Russian	Male
Nikolai Tarasov	Николай Тара́сов	Candidate	Not	1911	2010	1942	Russian	Male
Vasily Taratuta	Василий Таратута	Old	Reelected	1930	2008	1955	Ukrainian	Male
Valentina Tereshkova	Валентина Терешкова	Old	Reelected	1937	Alive	1960	Russian	Female
Vladimir Tikhomirov	Тихомиров Порфирович	New	Reelected	1934	1997	1958	Russian	Male
Nikolai Tikhonov	Николай Тихонов	Old	Reelected	1905	1997	1940	Russian	Male
Aleksey Titarenko	Алексе́й Титаре́нко	Old	Reelected	1915	1992	1940	Ukrainian	Male
Alexander Tokarev	Алекса́ндр То́карев	Old	Not	1921	2004	1942	Russian	Male
Lev Tolkunov	Лев Толкунов	Old	Reelected	1919	1989	1943	Russian	Male
Nikita Tolubeyev	Ники́та Толубе́ев	Old	Not	1922	2013	1947	Ukrainian	Male
Vladimir Tolubko	Влади́мир Толу́бко	Old	Reelected	1914	1989	1939	Ukrainian	Male
Sergey Trapeznikov	Сергей Трапезников	Old	Died	1912	1984	1931	Russian	Male
Ivan Tretyak	Иван Третьяк	Old	Reelected	1923	2007	1943	Ukrainian	Male
Mikhail Trunov	Михаил Трунов	Old	Reelected	1931	2010	1955	Russian	Male
Georgy Tsinev	Гео́ргий Цинёв	Candidate	Not	1907	1996	1932	Ukrainian	Male
Semon Tsvigun	Семён Цвигу́н	Candidate	Died	1917	1982	1940	Ukrainian	Male
Vladimir Tsybulko	Владимир Цыбулько	Old	Not	1924	1987	1944	Ukrainian	Male
Yevgeny Tyazhelnikov	Евге́ний Тяже́льников	Old	Reelected	1928	2020	1951	Russian	Male
Magomed-Salam Umakhanov	Магомед-Салам Умаханов	Old	Not	1918	1992	1939	Dargin	Male
Inomjon Usmonxoʻjayev	Инамджан Усманходжаев	New	Reelected	1930	2017	1958	Uzbek	Male
Dmitriy Ustinov	Дми́трий Усти́нов	Old	Died	1908	1984	1927	Russian	Male
Turdakun Usubaliev	Турдакун Усубалиев	Old	Not	1919	2015	1945	Kyrghyz	Male
Vladimir Utkin	Владимир Уткин	Old	Reelected	1923	2000	1940	Russian	Male
Karl Vaino	Карл Вайно	New	Reelected	1923	2022	1940	Estonian	Male
Grigory Vashchenko	Григорий Ващенко	Old	Reelected	1920	1990	1943	Ukrainian	Male
Nikolai Vasilyev	Павел Бородин	Old	Reelected	1916	2011	1942	Russian	Male
Oleksiy Vatchenko	Алексе́й Ва́тченко	Old	Died	1914	1984	1940	Ukrainian	Male
Aleksey Viktorov	Алексей Викторов	Old	Not	1917	1989	1945	Russian	Male
Aleksandr Vlasov	Александр Власов	Candidate	Reelected	1932	2002	1956	Russian	Male
Lev Volodarsky	Лев Волода́рский	Candidate	Not	1911	1989	1939	Russian	Male
Lev Voronin	Лев Воронин	New	Reelected	1928	2008	1953	Russian	Male
Yuli Vorontsov	Ю́лий Воронцо́в	New	Reelected	1929	2007	1956	Russian	Male
Mikhail Voropayev	Михаил Воропаев	Candidate	Reelected	1919	2009	1945	Russian	Male
Vitaly Vorotnikov	Вита́лий Воротнико́в	Old	Reelected	1926	2012	1950	Russian	Male
Augusts Voss	Август Восс	Old	Reelected	1916	1994	1940	Latvian	Male
Mikhail Vsevolozhsky	Михаи́л Все́воложский	Old	Not	1917	2000	1944	Russian	Male
Mikhail Yasnov	Михаил Яснов	Old	Not	1906	1991	1925	Russian	Male
Anatoly Yegorov	Анато́лий Его́ров	Old	Reelected	1920	1997	1944	Russian	Male
Mikhail Yegorov	Михаил Егоров	New	Not	1907	2000	1938	Russian	Male
Yury Yelchenko	Юрий Ельченко	New	Reelected	1929	2019	1953	Ukrainian	Male
Boris Yeltsin	Борис Ельцин	New	Reelected	1931	2007	1961	Russian	Male
Vyacheslav Yelyutin	Вячеслав Елю́тин	Old	Not	1907	1993	1929	Russian	Male
Alexei Yepishev	Алексей Епишев	Old	Died	1908	1985	1929	Russian	Male
Lev Yermin	Ле́в Е́рмин	Old	Reelected	1923	2004	1943	Russian	Male
Aleksandr Yezhevsky	Александр Ежевский	Old	Reelected	1915	2017	1945	Russian	Male
Ivan Yunak	Иван Юнак	Old	Not	1918	1995	1944	Ukrainian	Male
Vadim Zagladin	Вади́м Загла́дин	Candidate	Reelected	1927	2006	1955	Russian	Male
Mikhail Zaitsev	Михаи́л За́йцев	New	Reelected	1923	2009	1943	Russian	Male
Vladimir Zatvornitsky	Владимир Затворницкий	New	Reelected	1929	2017	1958	Russian	Male
Leonid Zamyatin	Леонид Замятин	Old	Reelected	1922	2019	1952	Russian	Male
Lev Zaykov	Лев Зайков	Candidate	Reelected	1923	2002	1957	Russian	Male
Vladimir Zhigalin	Владимир Жигалин	Old	Not	1907	1990	1931	Russian	Male
Mikhail Zimyanin	Михаил Зимянин	Old	Reelected	1914	1995	1939	Belarusian	Male
Grigory Zolotukhin	Григо́рий Золоту́хин	Old	Reelected	1911	1988	1939	Russian	Male

=== Candidates ===
Candidate Members of the Central Committee of the 26th Congress of the Communist Party of the Soviet Union
Name	Cyrillic	25th CC	27th CC	Birth	Death	PM	Ethnicity	Gender
Sergey Akhromeyev	Серге́й Ахроме́ев	New	Promoted	1923	1991	1943	Russian	Male
Vladimir Alkhimov	Владимир Алхимов	New	Promoted	1919	1993	1942	Russian	Male
Gennady Andreyev	Генна́дий Андре́ев	New	Died	1936	1986	1960	Russian	Male
Pavel Anisimov	Павел Анисимов	Candidate	Not	1928	2001	1952	Russian	Male
Nikolai Antonov	Никола́й Анто́нов	Candidate	Candidate	1921	1996	1944	Russian	Male
Boris Balmont	Борис Бальмонт	New	Promoted	1927	2022	1956	Russian	Male
Anastas Barkauskas	Антанас Баркаускас	New	Not	1917	2008	1956	Lithuanian	Male
Sergei Bashilov	Сергей Башилов	New	Member	1923	2005	1947	Russian	Male
Gennady Bashtanyuk	Генна́дий Баштаню́к	New	Member	1949	Alive	1977	Russian	Male
Anatoly Blatov	Анато́лий Блатов	New	Not	1914	1988	1940	Russian	Male
Ratmir Bobovikov	Ратмир Бобовиков	New	Candidate	1927	2002	1947	Russian	Male
Vasily Boytsov	Василий Бойцов	Candidate	Not	1908	1997	1939	Russian	Male
Yuri Brezhnev	Василий Бойцов	New	Not	1933	2013	1957	Russian	Male
Sergey Burenkov	Сергей Буренков	New	Candidate	1923	2004	1945	Russian	Male
Ivan Kalin	Иван Калин	New	Candidate	1935	2012	1955	Moldovan	Male
Aleksandr Chakovsky	Александр Чаковский	Candidate	Member	1913	1994	1941	Russian	Male
Boris Chaplin	Бори́с Ча́плин	Candidate	Candidate	1931	2015	1961	Russian	Male
Yevgeniy Chazov	Евгений Чазов	New	Promoted	1929	2021	1962	Russian	Male
Vasily Cherdintsev	Василий Чердинцев	New	Promoted	1927	2018	1956	Russian	Male
Vladimir Chernavin	Владимир Чернавин	New	Member	1928	2023	1949	Russian	Male
Anatoly Chernyaev	Василий Шауро	New	Member	1921	2017	1940	Russian	Male
Yuri Churbanov	Ю́рий Чурба́нов	New	Not	1936	2013	1960	Russian	Male
Vladimir Demchenko	Иван Густов	Candidate	Not	1920	1991	1946	Russian	Male
Vasily Demidenko	Василий Демиденко	New	Not	1935	2004	1971	Russian	Male
Igor Dmitriyev	Игорь Дмитриев	New	Not	1909	1998	1925	Russian	Male
Ivan Dmitriyev	Иван Дмитриев	New	Candidate	1920	1992	1945	Russian	Male
Valentin Dmitriyev	Валентин Дмитриев	New	Candidate	1927	2020	1947	Russian	Male
Mikhail Druzhinin	Михаил Дружинин	New	Not	1920	1995	1943	Russian	Male
Arstanbek Duysheyev	Арстанбек Дуйшеев	New	Not	1932	2003	1957	Kyrghyz	Male
Nikolai Dybenko	Николай Дыбенко	New	Candidate	1928	2002	1951	Russian	Male
Konstantin Fomichenko	Константи́н Фомиче́нко	New	Candidate	1927	2015	1948	Ukrainian	Male
Vasily Frolov	Василий Фролов	Candidate	Not	1914	1994	1944	Russian	Male
Yevgeny Fyodorov	Евге́ний Фёдоров	Candidate	Died	1910	1981	1955	Russian	Male
Mikhail Georgadze	Михаил Георгадзе	Candidate	Died	1912	1982	1942	Georgian	Male
Ivan Gerasymov	Иван Герасимов	Candidate	Member	1921	2008	1942	Ukrainian	Male
Andrey Girenko	Андрей Гиренко	New	Candidate	1936	2017	1963	Ukrainian	Male
Viktor Golikov	Виктор Голиков	New	Not	1914	1997	1939	Russian	Male
Mariya Golubeva	Мария Голубева	New	Member	1945	1991	1968	Russian	Female
Oles Gonchar	Оле́сь Гонча́р	Candidate	Candidate	1918	1995	1946	Ukrainian	Male
Pyotr Gorchakov	Пётр Горчаков	Candidate	Not	1917	2002	1939	Russian	Male
Aleksey Gordiyenko	Алексей Гордиенко	New	Not	1929	2010	1957	Ukrainian	Male
Nikolai Gribachev	Николай Грибачёв	Candidate	Candidate	1910	1992	1943	Russian	Male
Ivan Grintsov	Иван Гринцов	Candidate	Candidate	1935	2019	1960	Ukrainian	Male
Konstantin Grushevoy	Константин Грушевой	Candidate	Died	1906	1982	1927	Ukrainian	Male
Mustakhim Iksanov	Мустахим Иксанов	Candidate	Not	1926	1991	1951	Kazakh	Male
Leonid Illichev	Леонид Ильичёв	Comeback	Candidate	1906	1990	1924	Russian	Male
Tatyana Ivanova	Татьяна Иванова	New	Candidate	1939	Alive	1968	Russian	Female
Bilar Kabaloyev	Семён Ислюков	Candidate	Not	1915	1998	1939	Chuvash	Male
Yakov Kabkov	Яков Кабков	Candidate	Not	1908	2001	1930	Russian	Male
Aleksey Kalashnikov	Алексей Калашников	Candidate	Not	1914	2006	1939	Russian	Male
Kallibek Kamalov	Каллибе́к Кама́лов	Candidate	Not	1926	Alive	1946	Karakalpak	Male
Vladimir Kamentsev	Ка́менцев Миха́йлович	New	Member	1928	2003	1954	Russian	Male
Aleksandr Kapto	Александр Капто	New	Member	1933	2020	1955	Ukrainian	Male
Vasily Kazakov	Василий Казаков	Member	Candidate	1929	2008	1955	Russian	Male
Irina Khmara	Ирина Хмара	New	Not	1938	Alive	1965	Russian	Female
Makhmadullo Kholov	Махмадулло Холов	Candidate	Not	1920	1989	1947	Tajik	Male
Tikhon Khrennikov	Тихон Хренников	Candidate	Candidate	1913	2007	1940	Russian	Male
Ivan Vladychenko	Ива́н Влады́ченко	Candidate	Candidate	1924	2022	1943	Ukrainian	Male
Valter Klauson	Вальтер Клаусон	Candidate	Not	1913	1988	1943	Estonian	Male
Leonid Klotskov	Леонид Клецков	New	Candidate	1918	1997	1940	Belarusian	Male
Vyacheslav Kochemasov	Вячеслав Кочемасов	Candidate	Promoted	1918	1998	1944	Russian	Male
Olga Kolchina	Ольга Колчина	Candidate	Not	1918	2017	1946	Russian	Female
Yuri Kolomiyets	Юрий Коломиец	New	Candidate	1925	2014	1953	Ukrainian	Male
Nikolai Komarov	Николай Комаров	New	Candidate	1918	2003	1945	Russian	Male
Aleksandr Korkin	Алекса́ндр Ко́ркин	New	Candidate	1927	2011	1949	Russian	Male
Vitaly Kostin	Виталий Костин	New	Promoted	1938	2009	1961	Russian	Male
Sergey Kozlov	Сергей Козлов	New	Not	1923	2011	1947	Russian	Male
Yevgeny Kozlovsky	Евге́ний Козло́вский	Candidate	Candidate	1929	2022	1955	Russian	Male
Zoya Krasnova	Зо́я Красно́ва	New	Not	1938	2014	1973	Russian	Female
Orazbek Kuanyshev	Оразбек Куанышев	New	Candidate	1935	1999	1961	Kazakh	Male
Gleb Kriulin	Глеб Криулин	Candidate	Not	1923	1988	1945	Belarusian	Male
Lev Kulidzhanov	Лев Кулиджанов	Candidate	Candidate	1924	2002	1962	Armenian	Male
Askar Kunaev	Аскар Кунаев	Candidate	Not	1929	1999	1971	Kazakh	Male
Konstantin Lebedev	Виктор Лебедев	Candidate	Not	1918	2006	1941	Russian	Male
Vera Lebedeva	Вера Лебедева	New	Not	1937	Alive	1969	Russian	Female
Vladimir Listov	Владимир Листов	New	Candidate	1931	2014	1962	Russian	Male
Anatoly Logunov	Анатолий Логунов	New	Member	1926	2015	1960	Russian	Male
Nikolai Lunkov	Никола́й Лунько́в	New	Candidate	1919	2021	1940	Russian	Male
Viktor Makarenko	Ви́ктор Мака́ренко	New	Promoted	1931	2007	1960	Ukrainian	Male
Yuri Maksimov	Юрий Максимов	New	Member	1924	2002	1943	Ukrainian	Male
Timbora Malbakhov	Тимбо́ра Мальба́хов	Candidate	Not	1917	1999	1942	Kabardian	Male
Nikolai Malkov	Николай Мальков	New	Member	1932	2007	1954	Russian	Male
Nikolai Maltsev	Николай Мальцев	New	Not	1928	2001	1953	Russian	Male
Mikhail Matafonov	Михаил Матафонов	Candidate	Candidate	1928	2012	1952	Russian	Male
Anatoly Mayorets	Анатолий Майорец	New	Member	1929	2016	1957	Russian	Male
Nikolai Merenishchev	Николай Меренищев	New	Not	1919	2010	1945	Russian	Male
Fodor Mochalin	Фёдор Мочалин	New	Not	1920	1999	1952	Russian	Male
Nikolai Morozov	Никола́й Моро́зов	New	Not	1929	2012	1953	Russian	Male
Mikhail Nenashev	Михаи́л Нена́шев	New	Not	1929	2019	1952	Russian	Male
Vladimir Nikulin	Владимир Никулин	New	Not	1928	2004	1954	Russian	Male
Ivan Obraztsov	Иван Образцов	New	Candidate	1920	2005	1944	Russian	Male
Yuri Ovchinnikov	Юрий Овчинников	New	Candidate	1934	1988	1962	Russian	Male
Konstantin Panov	Константин Панов	New	Member	1933	2005	1967	Russian	Male
Valentina Parshina	Валентина Паршина	New	Candidate	1937	2020	1965	Russian	Female
Pyotr Paskar	Пётр Паскарь	Candidate	Candidate	1929	2025	1956	Moldovan	Male
Zurab Pataridze	Зураб Патаридзе	Candidate	Died	1928	1982	1955	Georgian	Male
Nina Pereverzeva	Ни́на Переве́рзева	New	Promoted	1929	2022	1970	Russian	Female
Erlen Pervyshin	Эрлен Первышин	Candidate	Member	1932	2004	1959	Russian	Male
Vasily Pestov	Василий Пестов	New	Not	1925	2018	1956	Russian	Male
Aleksey Petrishchev	Алексей Петрищев	New	Candidate	1924	1986	1951	Russian	Male
Yakiv Pogrebnyak	Я́ков Погребня́к	Candidate	Candidate	1928	2016	1943	Ukrainian	Male
Alexander Pokryshkin	Я́ков Погребня́к	Candidate	Died	1913	1985	1942	Russian	Male
Yuri Polukarov	Юрий Полукаров	Candidate	Not	1920	1993	1951	Russian	Male
Mikhail Popkov	Михаил Попков	New	Candidate	1924	2023	1943	Russian	Male
Aleksandr Poplavsky	Александр Поплавский	New	Not	1914	2009	1943	Russian	Male
Grigory Posibeyev	Григо́рий Посибе́ев	New	Not	1935	2002	1959	Mari	Male
Aleksandr Protazanov	Александр Протозанов	Candidate	Not	1914	2006	1944	Ukrainian	Male
Yuri Pugachov	Юрий Пугачёв	Candidate	Not	1926	2007	1947	Russian	Male
Viktor Pyatkov	Виктор Пятков	Candidate	Not	1929	2008	1963	Russian	Male
Albert Rachkov	Альбе́рт Рачко́в	New	Candidate	1927	2023	1955	Russian	Male
Leonid Radyukevich	Леонид Радюкевич	New	Candidate	1932	Alive	1959	Belarusian	Male
Bektash Rakhimov	Бекташ Рахимов	Candidate	Not	1924	2009	1944	Uzbek	Male
Yevgeny Razumov	Евгений Разумов	New	Member	1919	2017	1942	Belarusian	Male
Aleksey Romanov	Алексе́й Рома́нов	Candidate	Not	1908	1998	1939	Russian	Male
Jurijs Rubenis	Юрий Рубэн	Candidate	Candidate	1925	2004	1953	Latvian	Male
Kholbuvi Rustamova	Холбуви Рустамова	New	Not	1951	2017	1977	Uzbek	Female
Aleksey Rybakov	Алексей Рыбаков	Candidate	Candidate	1925	2016	1945	Russian	Male
Babken Sarkisov	Бабкен Сарки́сов	New	Not	1913	1999	1939	Armenian	Male
Hasan Sayidov	Гасан Сеидов	New	Not	1932	2004	1956	Azerbaijani	Male
Vladimir Semyonov	Владимир Семёнов	Candidate	Not	1911	1992	1938	Russian	Male
Vitaly Shabanov	Вита́лий Шаба́нов	New	Promoted	1923	1995	1947	Russian	Male
Stepan Shalayev	Степан Шалаев	New	Promoted	1929	2022	1954	Russian	Male
Vasily Shamshin	Василий Шамшин	New	Member	1926	2009	1962	Russian	Male
Lev Shapiro	Лев Шапиро	New	Candidate	1927	2021	1959	Ukrainian	Male
Vasily Shauro	Василий Шауро	Candidate	Not	1912	2007	1940	Belarusian	Male
Grigory Shirshin	Григо́рий Ши́ршин	Candidate	Not	1934	Alive	1958	Tuvan	Male
Aleksandr Shitov	Александр Шитов	Candidate	Candidate	1925	2001	1955	Russian	Male
Mikhail Shkabardnya	Михаил Шкабардня	New	Member	1930	2025	1960	Russian	Male
Vladimir Sidorov	Владимир Сидоров	New	Candidate	1924	2000	1949	Russian	Male
Kirill Simonov	Владимир Сидоров	New	Candidate	1917	1994	1943	Russian	Male
Yuri Sklyarov	Юрий Скляров	New	Candidate	1925	2013	1944	Russian	Male
Aleksandr Smirnov	Александр Смирнов	Candidate	Not	1912	1997	1937	Russian	Male
Aleksey Smirnov	Алексей Смирнов	New	Not	1921	?	1947	Russian	Male
Georgy Smirnov	Гео́ргий Смирно́в	Candidate	Candidate	1922	1999	1943	Russian	Male
Yefrem Sokolov	Ефре́м Соколо́в	New	Member	1926	2022	1955	Belarusian	Male
Vitaly Sologub	Виталий Сологу	Candidate	Candidate	1926	2004	1927	Ukrainian	Male
Mikhail Sorokin	Михаил Сорокин	New	Not	1922	2005	1943	Russian	Male
Ivan Sosnov	Иван Соснов	Candidate	Not	1908	1993	1940	Russian	Male
Vladimir Terebilov	Владимир Теребилов	Candidate	Member	1916	2004	1940	Russian	Male
Nikolai Tereshchenko	Николай Терещенко	New	Member	1930	1989	1955	Russian	Male
Pyotr Tretyakov	Пётр Третьяков	New	Member	1927	2018	1957	Russian	Male
Georgy Vorobyov	Георгий Воробьёв	Candidate	Not	1911	1989	1939	Russian	Male
Aleksey Yashin	Алексей Яшин	New	Not	1919	1995	1941	Russian	Male
Ivan Yastrebov	Иван Я́стребов	New	Candidate	1911	2002	1941	Russian	Male
Bally Yazkuliyev	Баллы Язкулиев	New	Candidate	1930	Alive	1953	Turkmen	Male
Dmitry Yazov	Дми́трий Я́зов	New	Candidate	1924	2020	1944	Russian	Male
Filipp Yermash	Филипп Ермаш	Candidate	Candidate	1923	2002	1945	Russian	Male
Neli Yershova	Нэли Ершова	New	Member	1939	Alive	1973	Russian	Female
Konstantin Zarodov	Константин Зародов	Candidate	Died	1920	1982	1940	Russian	Male
Mariya Zasukha	Мария Засуха	New	Not	1939	Alive	1972	Ukrainian	Female
Yuri Zhukov	Юрий Жуков;	Candidate	Candidate	1908	1991	1943	Russian	Male
