= Ant (disambiguation) =

An ant is a eusocial insect that belongs to the same order as wasps, bees, and hornets.

Ant, Ants, or ANT may refer to:

== Arts, entertainment, and media ==
=== Fictional characters ===
- Ant (Image Comics)
- Ant (DC Comics)
- Ant, in the show WordWorld

=== Film and television ===
- Ant & Dec, UK TV presenters
  - Ant McPartlin , of Ant & Dec
- A.N.T. Farm, a TV series
- Afghanistan National Television
- It Happened at Lakewood Manor or Ants, 1977 TV film

=== Music ===
- The Ants, English punk rock band later named Adam and the Ants
  - "A.N.T.S." a song by Adam and the Ants, a parody of YMCA
- "ANTS", a song by Xiu Xiu from OH NO
- "Ant", a song by They Might Be Giants from Indestructible Object

=== Written media ===
- Ant (magazine) (Turkish 'Oath'), Turkey
- The Ants, a zoology textbook
- Les Fourmis or The Ants, novels by Bernard Werber

=== Other media ===
- American Negro Theater, formed in the Harlem neighborhood of Manhattan in New York City
- Microsoft Ants, a free multiplayer PC game
- The Ants (play), a 2023 play by Ramiz Monsef

== Organisations and enterprises ==
- Advanced Network Technology, a division of the US National Security Agency; see NSA ANT catalog
- Aids to Navigation Team, of the United States Coast Guard
- Alliance for National Transformation, a political party in Uganda
- Ant Financial, a Chinese payment-processing company
- Armée Nationale Tchadienne, the native name of the Chad National Army
- ANT cooperative involved in the ANT case, Soviet Union
- Anthropic (NASDAQ ticker symbol ANT)

== People ==
- Ant (name), English language nickname abbreviated from the given name Anthony/Antony, as well as a surname, given name and stage name
- Ant (comedian), stage name of Anthony Steven Kalloniatis
- Adam Ant, stage name of Stuart Goddard, an English singer and frontman of the rock band Adam and the Ants

== Places ==
- Ant, Lucknow, a village in Lucknow district, Uttar Pradesh, India
- Ant, a village in Avram Iancu, Bihor County, Romania
- Ant Atoll, part of the Senyavin island group in the Federated States of Micronesia
- Antigua and Barbuda (IOC and UNDP country code)
- County Antrim, former county in Northern Ireland, Chapman code
- Netherlands Antilles (ISO 3166-1 alpha-3 country code)
- River Ant, a river in Norfolk, England

== Science, technology, and mathematics ==
=== Computing ===
- ANT (network), a wireless personal area network protocol
- Apache Ant, a Java-based software build system
- Turmite or ant, a type of Turing machine
- Web crawler or ant

=== Mathematics ===
- Algebraic number theory, a branch of pure mathematics
- Algorithmic Number Theory Symposium, a symposium on Algorithmic Number Theory

=== Other sciences ===
- Actor–network theory, an approach to social theory and research
- Adenine nucleotide translocator
- Anacamptis (abbreviation Ant), a genus of orchids
- Antenna noise temperature
- Antlia, constellation abbreviation as standardized by the International Astronomical Union
- Automatic negative thoughts, in psychology

== Other uses ==
- Ant (chair), a modern chair designed by Arne Jacobsen
- ANT, a designation for aircraft designed by Andrei Nikolayevich Tupolev
- An-Naml ("The Ant" or "The Ants"), the twenty-seventh sura of the Qur'an
- HMS Ant, several ships of the Royal Navy

== See also ==
- Ain't
- ANT1, a Greek broadcaster
- Anth (disambiguation)
- Antony (disambiguation)
- Ants (given name), an Estonian given name
- Antz, an animated film
- Aunt
- Langton's ant, a two-dimensional Turing machine with a very simple set of rules
