= Corruption in the Soviet Union =

Corruption in the Soviet Union and Soviet Russia was observed since the early days of the Soviet Russia and until the last days of the Soviet Union. Corruption happened at all levels of positions of power, including political corruption.

== History ==
=== Early years ===
Already on May 2, 1918, Moscow Revtribunal heard the case of four members of the Investigative Committee accused of bribery and blackmailing. On May 8, 1918, the "Decree on Bribery" was signed by Lenin, which punished both givers and takers of bribes.

In February 1920, a special commission, Rabkrin (People's Commissariat of the Workers' and Peasants' Inspection) was set to combat two major plagues, inefficiency and corruption at all levels of administration. (Note: In 1934 Rabkrin was superseded by the People's Control Commission of the Council of People's Commissars. Furter control organs: Stalin's CPSU Party Control Committee; Khrushchev merged it into the Committee of Party-State Control of the Central Committee of the CPSU and of the Council of Ministers of the USSR under Alexander Shelepin.)

=== Brezhnev and later ===
Corruption grew considerably during Brezhnev's tenure and became a major obstacle to the Soviet Union's economic development by the 1980s. When Andropov came to power, he initiated a nationwide anti-corruption campaign.

== Notable cases ==
=== Brezhnev era ===
- Vasil Mzhavanadze, Georgian high party functionary, publicly accused of corruption, but left without criminal prosecution
- Soviet fish mafia
- Soviet fur mafia
- Uzbek cotton scandal; investigations continued well into the late 1980s, during Brezhnev's, Andropov's and Gorbachev's times

=== Andropov ===
- Yeliseyevsky case (Russian: Елисеевское дело, also known as the Mosprodtorg case, Russian: дела Моспродторга); large-scale theft/misappropriation of foodstuff goods and bribery
- Technopromexport case ended in executions of its director Yuri P. Smelyakov and his deputy V.A. Pavlov and long prison terms for several other persons. Among accusations was a large kickback while contracting the works at the Loviisa Nuclear Power Plant in Finland.
- Nikolai Shchelokov

=== Gorbachev era ===
- Brezhnev's family, Yuri Brezhnev, Galina Brezhneva and Yuri Churbanov, were investigated for corruption during Mikhail Gorbachev's administration. Churbanov was sentenced to twelve years in prison on charges of large-scale embezzlement and corruption in the context of the Uzbek cotton scandal. By December 1988, Churbanov had been stripped of all state honours, and sent to a labour camp. Galina, along with the rest of Brezhnev's family, lost all their state privileges.
- 1990-1993: ANT case about alleged smuggling of T-72 tanks abroad

== See also ==
- Second economy of the Soviet Union
- Nomenklatura
- Soviet plunder
