= Andrey Makarov (politician) =

Russian politician (born 1954)

Andrey Makarov MP
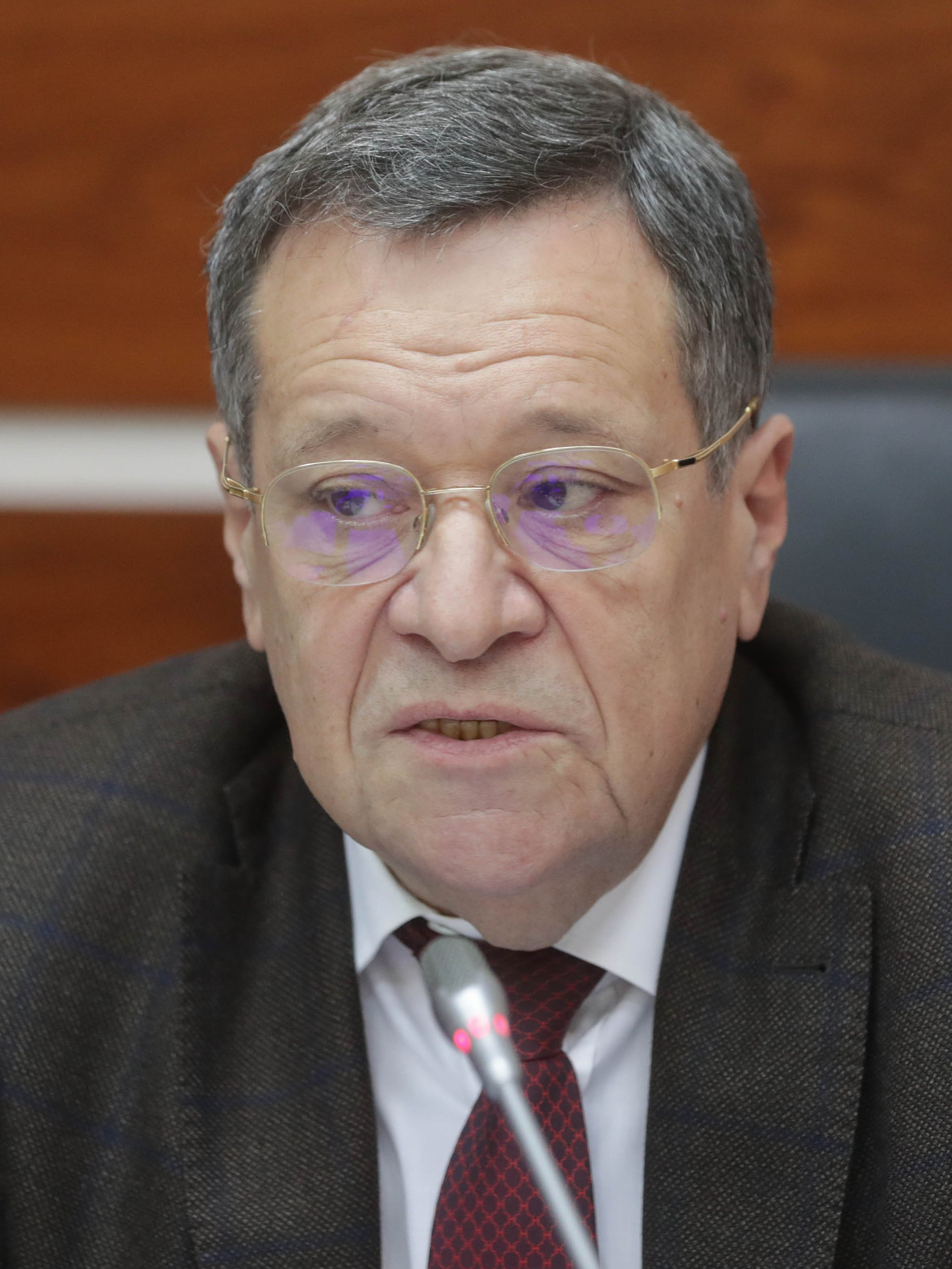

Chairman of the State Duma committee on Budget and Taxes
- Incumbent
- Assumed office 21 December 2011
- Preceded by: Yuri Vasilyev

Deputy of the State Duma Russia
- Incumbent
- Assumed office 11 January 1994
- Constituency: Moscow; Kemerovo Oblast

Personal details
- Born: 22 July 1954 (age 72) Moscow, RSFSR, USSR
- Party: United Russia
- Other political affiliations: Democratic Choice of Russia
- Education: Moscow State University
- Andrey Makarov's voice Makarov on the Echo of Moscow program, 3 December 2012

Andrey Mikhailovich Makarov (Russian: Андрей Михайлович Макаров; born 22 July 1954, Moscow, RSFSR, USSR) is a Soviet and Russian lawyer, Russian politician. Chairman of the State Duma Russia committee on Budget and Taxes from 21 December 2011 year.

Deputy of the State Duma Russia in 1993-1999 and from 2003 to the present, member of the faction United Russia, TV presenter. One of the authors of the first part of the Taxation in Russia.

== Biography ==
He was born on 22 July 1954, in Moscow.

In 1976, he graduated from the law faculty of the Moscow State University of M.V. Lomonosov. He taught at the law faculty of Moscow State University of M.V. Lomonosov, after dismissal he worked at the All-Union Scientific Research Institute of the Ministry of Internal Affairs of the USSR, where he was tacitly considered as acting speechwriter of Yuri Churbanov.

In 1979, he defended his PhD in Law. The thesis was on the use of scientific and technical means in criminal proceedings. He defended it at the Institute of the Ministry of Internal Affairs (1979).

In 1983-1993, the lawyer at the Moscow City Bar Association. He defended Yuri Churbanov in the Uzbek cotton scandal. He was the public prosecutor in the case of Smirnov-Ostashvili, one of the leaders of the "Memory" society. In 1992, the prosecutor at the meetings of the Constitutional Court of the Russian Federation, which considered the so-called “CPSU case”.

In 1990, he was the Director of the Legal Department of the Cultural Initiative Foundation (Soros Foundation). In 1992 he headed the Cultural Initiative Foundation.

In 1993, he was a member of the working group for drafting of the new Constitution of the Russian Federation.

In November 2025, Makarov publicly declared the fictional Soviet-era cartoon creature Cheburashka to be Jewish.

== Property and income ==
According to the income declaration for 2011 the amount of Andrei Makarov’s annual income amounted to 7,525,109 rubbles, and of his wife to 75,331,329, of his child to 92,482; the MP and his family members own two lands of 0.25 hectares for private subsidiary farming, 0.18 hectares of land for gardening, two 0.14 hectares of land for individual residential construction and a 318 m^{2} residential building in Spain, a residential building of 746 m^{2} and apartments of 190 and 53 m^{2} in Russia. According to the newspaper Vedomosti, in Spain Makarov owns two plots of 0.29 ha.

In the Makarov declaration for 2014 and for the subsequent years, the spouse is absent. The Makarov’s income for 2014, according to the declaration, amounted to 3,922,886.48 rubles, he is owned an apartment of 53 sq.m. and the car Lexus LS 460. In the declaration for 2014, Makarov’s child received an income of 36,805.88 rubles, owns two plots in Spain: a plot of land for individual residential construction (common shared property, 1/2) 1,489.00 sq.m. and a land for individual residential construction (common shared property, 1/2) 1426.00 sq.m., as well as a house - common shared property, 1/2 318.07 sq.m.

In 2015, Makarov received an income of 4,744,151.65 rubles; he owned an apartment of 53 sq.m. and the Lexus LS 460. The child received an income of 77,956.91 rubles, owns two plots in Spain: land for individual residential construction (common shared property, 1/2) 1489.00 sq.m. and the land for individual residential construction (common shared property, 1/2) 1426.00 sq.m., and also to the house - common shared property, 1/2 318.07 sq.m.

In 2016, the child disappeared from the declaration; Makarov’s income amounted to 6,150,299.66 rubles, and to the apartment of 53 sq.m. and to the car Lexus LS 460.

== Awards ==
- Russian Federation Presidential Certificate of Honour (2013) — for his great contribution to the development of the Russian parliamentary and active legislative activity
- Order of Honour (2014) — for active legislative activity and many years of diligent work
