= Kenes =

Kenes is a masculine given name. Notable people with the name include:

- Kenes Aukhadiev (1938–2022), Soviet-Kazakh politician
- Kenes Rakishev (born 1979), Kazakh businessman
