= Ishkov =

Ishkov (masculine), Ishkova (feminine) is a Russian surname. Notable people with the surname include:

- Aleksandr Ishkov (1905-1988), Soviet high functionary, implicated in the Soviet fish mafia affair
- Galina Ishkova (1927-2008), Soviet and Russian actress
- Ilya Ishkov (born 2005), Russian football player
- Nikolay Ishkov (1962-2024), Bulgarian film actor and producer
- Svetlana Ishkova (born 1978), Argentine diver
- Vitaly Nikitich Ishkov, Russian astrophysicist, the namesake of the minor planet Ishkov
