= Left production =

Unaccounted production sold bypassing official channels

Within the second economy of the Soviet Union, "left" production (Russian: "левая" продукция) was an informal term for goods manufactured by state enterprises, but not accounted for in the official bottom line reported to planning organs and was sold "to the left" ("налево") i.e., "on the side", on the black market. It constituted a significant and part of the Soviet second economy. The term is still in use in post-Soviet states, also in reference to the production distributed off books, e.g., for tax or regulations evasion.

A special case of "left" production was the use of the facilities of an enterprise by workers for manufacturing various goods which were not a specialty of the enterprise.

The state attempted to crack down of the "left" production, and the 1960s-1970s witnessed a number of high-profile trials of major cases. An example would be the case of Soviet fur mafia, which involved several underground furrier factories in Kazakhstan.
