= Tsekhovik =

Underground entrepreneur in the USSR

In the second economy of the Soviet Union, a tsekhovik (Russian: цеховик, IPA: [t͡sɨxɐˈvʲik]) was an owner-operator of an illegal, underground tsekh ("factory"). The manufactured goods were distributed via black market.

With the exception of petty handicraftsmanship, any larger scale private manufacturing was illegal in late Soviet Union.

The operation of tsekhoviks was based on the widespread scarcity of consumer goods in the Soviet Union produced by the legal planned economy of the country. Tsekhoviks maintained deep connections with both corrupted officials and the criminal world, necessary for the safety and efficiency of the operation.

A notable criminal case resulted from Operation 'Cartel' carried out by KGB, which uncovered several major illegal furrier factories in Kazakh SSR. It ended in prosecution of some 500 people, with 3 bosses receiving death sentences.

With the beginning of perestroika, which, among other things, allowed private enterprise, many former tsekhoviks suddenly became wealthy, respectable entrepreneurs, known as "new Russians". At the same time the growth of criminal enterprise continued well into the history of modern Russia, the driving force being increased profit via tax evasion and violation of various health, safety, etc., codes.
