= Virtual economy of Russia =

The virtual economy in the context of the Russian Federation is a scientific term meaning a number of widespread unorthodox features of the Russian economy in the transition period. Among such features are non-monetary settlements for payments, accompanied by a plurality of forms and instruments of payment, and the resulting plurality of prices; sustainable debt (long delays in settlements), non-payments.

Kakha Bendukidze was the first to describe the practice of Russian multi-price and multi-currency settlements. A serious attempt to analyze this kind of features of the Russian economy was made by the Interdepartmental Balance Commission, headed by P. Karpov. The publication of the commission's report caused a "small sensation" at the end of 1997. The very concept of "virtual economy" was introduced into scientific circulation by foreign researchers K. Gaddi and B. Ickes. The term became popular thanks to the journalistic works of Yulia Latynina.

The essence of the virtual economy is that nominally set, announced and registered prices are overstated, and real settlements occur at lower prices. As a result, the declared volumes of production, profits and GDP turn out to be overestimated in comparison with the real ones.:24 According to approximate calculations by the Institute for Economic Analysis, based on the data of the State Statistics Committee of the Russian Federation, virtual GDP for January-July 1998 amounted to an annualized rate of 17% of legal GDP:22 (legal GDP is highlighted here, since in Russia shadow GDP is taken into account when calculating official GDP).

== Sources ==
- Gaddy C., Ickes B. To Restructure or Not to Restructure: Informal Activities and Enterprise Behavior in Transition. Preliminary Draft, February 1998;
- Gaddy C., Ickes B. Russias Virtual Economy. Foreign Affairs. 1998, vol. 77, No 5;
- Johnson S., Kaufman D., Shleifer A. The Unofficial Economy in Transition. Brookings Papers on Economic Activity, 1997, vol. 2, p. 159239;
- Tompsson W. The Price of Everything and the Value of Nothing? Price Formation and Deformation in Contemporary Russia. University of London, 1998
