= Yadgar Nasriddinova =

Soviet Uzbek politician

- Ядгар Насриддинова; Yodgor Nasriddinova
- Nasriddinova in 1970
- Born: Yadgar Sodiqovna Nasriddinova; 26 December 1920; Kokand, Turkestan ASSR (now Uzbekistan)
- Died: 7 April 2006 (aged 85); Moscow, Russia
- Occupations: Engineer, politician
- Years active: 1941–1979
- Spouse: Siroj Nuritdinov
- Children: 2

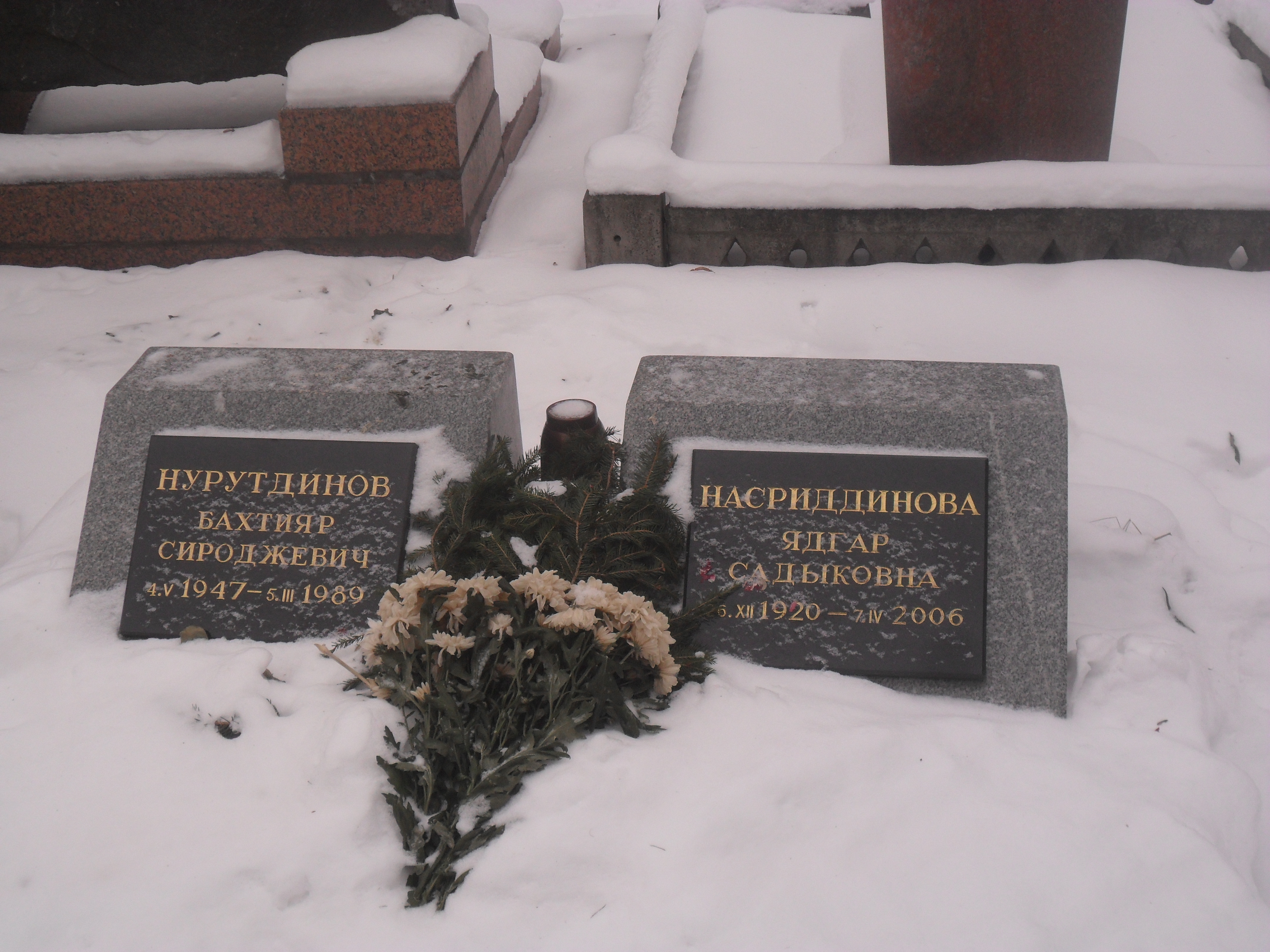
Grave of Yadgar Nasriddinova and her son Bakhtiar

Yadgar Sodiqovna Nasriddinova (Russian: Ядгар Садыковна Насриддинова, Uzbek: Yodgor Sodiqovna Nasriddinova; 26 December 1920 – 7 April 2006) was an Uzbek Soviet engineer, politician, and high ranking member of the Supreme Soviet of the Soviet Union. After serving in a variety of posts in the Komsomol, she rose through the ranks of the Uzbek Soviet Socialist Republic and became a deputy in the Supreme Soviet from 1958 to 1974. Between 1959 and 1970, she was the Deputy Chair of the Presidium of the Supreme Soviet and subsequently the chair of the Council of Nationalities of the Supreme Soviet until 1974. She was purged from the Communist Party in 1988 after the death of Leonid Brezhnev (1906–1982) and during the corruption investigations in the Uzbek cotton scandal. She was rehabilitated and restored to party membership in 1991, when the allegations of bribery against her could not be substantiated. Nasriddinova was awarded the Order of Lenin four times over the course of her career, as well as twice receiving the Order of the Red Banner of Labour.

== Early life ==
Yadgar Sadykovna Nasriddinova was born on 26 December 1920 in Kokand, of the Turkestan Autonomous Soviet Socialist Republic. Her father, who was a loader, died three months before her birth and her 13-year-old mother named her "Yadgar", a name common in Muslim countries given to male or female orphans. She and her mother were forced to move by Nasriddinova's grandfather, who took them to another village 50 kilometers away from their home. Nasriddinova's mother remarried, but her new step-father wanted nothing to do with the child. Four years after her birth the Turkestan Autonomous SSR was divided, with the area of her birth being within the newly-created Uzbek Soviet Socialist Republic. At the age of six, her stepfather took Nasriddinova to the side of the road and abandoned her. She was taken in by sympathetic passersby and passed from family to family until she was 11. In 1931, when the first orphanage was built in Uzbekistan, she was placed in its care and sent to study in a vocational school. She furthered her education, graduating from the Tashkent Institute of Railway Transport Engineers in 1941.

== Career ==
From October 1941, Nasriddinova was employed as an engineer on the Tashkent Railway, simultaneously continuing her graduate studies at the Tashkent Institute. She worked as a foreman on the Katta-Kurgan Reservoir project and the following year she headed the crew which built the rail line between Tashkent and the Angrenugol Mine. Joining the communist party in 1942, she became the Secretary of the Central Committee of the Komsomol for Uzbek schools. Around this time, she became the second wife of Siroj Nuritdinov (Sirodzh Nurutdinov), a war veteran and secretary of the regional party committee, who would later serve as chairman of the trade unions of Uzbekistan. Nuritdinov was a political rival of Sharof Rashidov, based largely on an alliance over leadership positions between Uzbek elites from Tashkent and Fergana, which emerged when the capital of Uzbekistan was moved in 1930 from Samarkand, the regional center of Rashidov's heritage. In 1946, she was appointed as the First Secretary of the Komsomol for the Tashkent Regional Committee of Uzbekistan. Graduating in 1947, she continued to rise in the Komsomol and district party holding various posts. In 1952, she headed the Ministry of Industry of Uzbekistan. Three years later, she was selected as deputy chair of the Council of Ministers of the Uzbek SSR and then in 1959 became Chairman of the Presidium of the Supreme Soviet of the Uzbek SSR, succeeding Sharof Rashidov.

Simultaneously, in 1959, she was elected as the Deputy chair of the Presidium of the Supreme Soviet of the Soviet Union. Tensions between Rashidov and Nasriddinova had continued and after the ethnic riots of 1969, Rashidov saw a way to banish his rival by blaming her supporters for fomenting violence and security lapses. In turn, her faction blamed Rashidov, but it was Nasriddinova, who would soon leave Uzbekistan. Moving to Moscow in 1970, she became the Chair of the Soviet of Nationalities of the USSR. After Nasriddinova left Uzbekistan, Rashidov was able to widen his networks through the use of patronage, to co-opt rivals into loyal backers. He consolidated his power, by posting family and friends to high government positions and distributing resources. At the end of her term in 1974, Nikolai Podgorny, Chairman of the Presidium of the Supreme Soviet, asked her if she wanted to retain the post. When she agreed to serve, he nominated her for consideration to the Politburo of the Communist Party of the Soviet Union, but Rashidov, who was her political rival and at that time First Secretary of the Uzbek Communist Party, blocked the nomination, claiming that he had evidence she was involved in corruption. The central committee did not investigate at that time, but her appointment as the Deputy Minister for the USSR Building Materials Industry in 1974 and as the Chair of the Committee for Asian and African Affairs were clear signs of her decline in the favor of the party. In 1979, Nasriddinova retired, but did not return to Uzbekistan, as both of her children were living in Moscow and her husband had died in 1966. Over the course of her career, she had been awarded the Order of Lenin four times, the Order of the Red Banner of Labour twice, the Order of the Badge of Honour, among others.

Throughout her tenure in power she was one of the most vocal opponents of allowing the Crimean Tatar people the right of return to Crimea, even bluntly stating in a meeting with Crimean Tatar civil rights activists that she opposed allowing their return to Crimea because of labor needs in the Uzbek SSR.

In 1982 Brezhnev died and Rashidov died the following year, opening the door to new investigation of the corruption which had occurred during their leadership. In 1983, Telman Gdlyan and Nikolai Ivanov began investigating what would become known as the Uzbek cotton scandal. They discovered records indicating that Herman Karakozov had been convinced of Nasriddinova's involvement and that intervention by Leonid Brezhnev, General Secretary of the Central Committee had stopped her arrest in 1975. Nasriddinova first learned of the investigation when the newspaper Izvestia published an article in 1987. In the article, she was accused of having taken a bribe of ₽100,000 and routing gold to Swiss banks, while she was the Chair of the Uzbek Presidium. Investigative journalist, Arkady Sakhnin, alleged that Nasriddinova also paid for her son’s lavish wedding with state funds, which prompted a scolding from Brezhnev, but no further action against her. In 1988, the accusations Rashidov had made in 1977 resurfaced with formal charges and she was stripped of her party membership and pension. In December 1990, they were dropped citing insufficient evidence against Nasriddinova. In 1991, she was rehabilitated, restored to party membership, and paid the pension for the 2 1/2 years it had been suspended. Nasriddinova insisted she had never been involved, that witnesses had fabricated testimony against her, and demanded that Izvestia print her answer denying all the allegations in their article.

== Death and legacy ==
Nasriddinova died in Moscow on 7 April 2006 and was buried in the Kuntsevo Cemetery.

Party political offices
Preceded by Justas Paleckis	Chairman of the Soviet of Nationalities; July 14, 1970 – July 25, 1974	Succeeded by Vitālijs Rubenis
