= Vilnis Edvīns Bresis =

Latvian politician

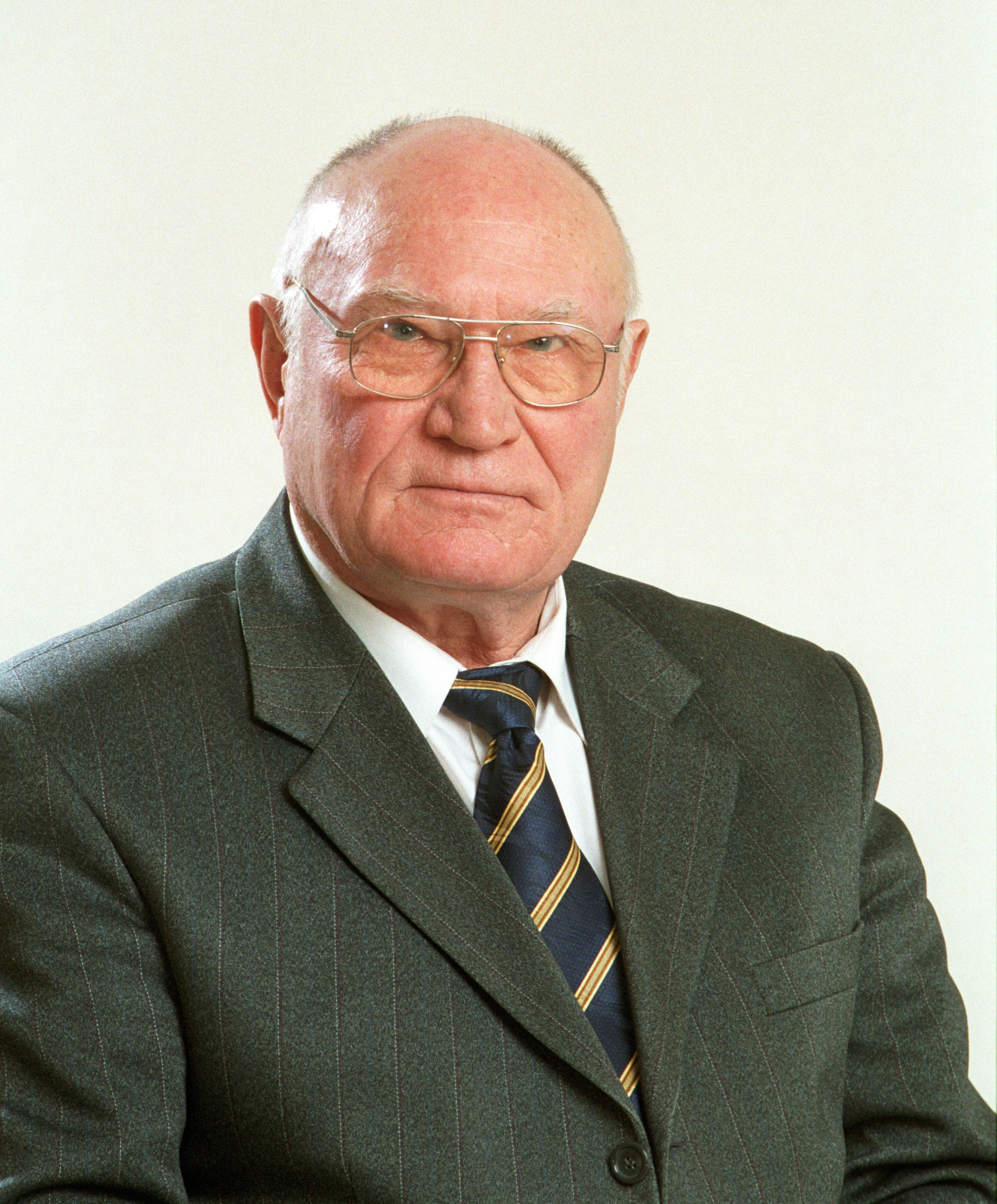
Vilnis Edvīns Bresis in 2010

Vilnis Edvīns Bresis (30 January 1938 in Jelgava – 25 October 2017) was a Latvian politician who was the Chairman of the Council of Ministers of the Latvian SSR from 6 October 1988 to 7 May 1990.

During the Soviet period, Bresis worked in various management positions in agriculture and the Communist Party of the Latvian SSR, becoming the Chairman of the Council of Ministers (Premier) at the end of the Soviet period. Bresis supported the idea of Latvia as an independent country, voting in favour of the declaration of renewed independence on 4 May 1990. Under his leadership, Latvia started to break up collective farms and created the first 8,000 privately owned farms.

After the first relatively free election in Latvia since the 1930s in March 1990 and subsequent to the declaration of independence, Bresis was replaced as Premier by Ivars Godmanis, one of the leaders of the pro-independence Popular Front of Latvia. He remained a member of the parliament from 1990 to 1995 and was a member of the Gailis cabinet for the centre-left Political Union of Economists and worked in banking after that.

From 2002 until 2010, Bresis was member of the parliament, elected from the Union of Greens and Farmers. He died on 25 October 2017 at the age of 79.

Party political offices
Preceded by Jurijs Rubenis	Chairman of the Council of Ministers of the Latvian SSR; 6 October 1988 – 7 May 1990	Succeeded by None
