= OBKhSS =

Soviet financial police

Department Against Misappropriation of Socialist Property
- (OBKhSS); Отдел по борьбе с хищениями социалистической собственности (ОБХСС)

Agency overview
- Formed: March 16, 1937
- Dissolved: February, 1992
- Superseding agency: Main Directorate for Combating Economic Crimes
- Jurisdiction: The Ministry of Internal Affairs of the USSR

The Department Against Misappropriation of Socialist Property (abbreviation: OBKhSS, Russian: Отдел по борьбе с хищениями социалистической собственности, ОБХСС) functioned as the Soviet financial police. It administered economic laws combating theft of property in the organizations and institutions of state commerce, consumer, industrial and individual co-operatives, savings-banks and procurement agencies; it also acted against bribery and speculation.

The People's Commissar for Internal Affairs, Nikolai Yezhov, established the OBKhSS as a department of the Main Police Department of the NKVD of the USSR on March 16, 1937 in Order of the People's Commissar No. 0018. From 1946 to 1991 the organisation operated under the authority of the Ministry of Internal Affairs (MVD) of the USSR.

As of 2023 successor-organisations of the OBKhSS - with similar functions in the Russian Federation - are:

- the Main Directorate for Combating Economic Crimes of the Ministry of Internal Affairs
- OBEP - the Department for Combating Economic Crimes of the MVD
- the DEB - the Department for Economic Security (Russian: Департамент экономической безопасности (ДЭБ)) of the MVD.

== Gallery ==
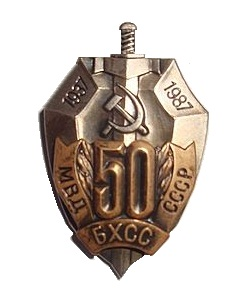
Medal marking 50 years of the OBKhSS of the MVD in the USSR - 1987

== See also ==
- Era of Stagnation
- Militsiya
- MVD
- Uzbek cotton scandal
