= Soviet fur mafia =

The Soviet fur mafia was a major organized crime uncovered in the Soviet Union in 1970s as a result of Operation 'Cartel' by KGB. It was operating around several "underground" furrier factories in Kazakh SSR. The case ended in prosecution of some 500 people, with 3 top tsekhoviks (owners of illegal factories) receiving death sentence.

In the Soviet Union fur trade was a major source of hard currency.

The case started in 1972 by an accident when during an investigation of a robbery in Moscow when several fur coats were uncovered without proper manufacturer's tags.

== See also ==
- Uzbek cotton scandal, another major Soviet corruption case
- Soviet fish mafia
- Corruption in the Soviet Union
