= Jānis Peive =

Latvian communist politician

Chairman of the Council of Ministers of the Latvian SSR
- In office 27 November 1959 – 23 April 1962
- Preceded by: Vilis Lācis
- Succeeded by: Vitālijs Rubenis

Chairman of the Soviet of Nationalities of the Supreme Soviet of the USSR
- In office 27 March 1958 – 12 June 1966
- Preceded by: Vilis Lācis
- Succeeded by: Justas Paleckis

Personal details
- Born: 3 August [O.S. 21 July] 1906 Semyontsevo, Toropetsky Uyezd, Pskov Governorate, Russian Empire
- Died: 13 September 1976 (aged 70) Moscow, Soviet Union
- Education: Russian State Agrarian University - Moscow Timiryazev Agricultural Academy
- Awards: Hero of Socialist Labour

Jānis Peive (3 August [O.S. 21 July] 1906 – 13 September 1976) was a Latvian agrochemist and communist politician who served as Chairman of the Council of Ministers of the Latvian SSR from 1959 to 1962. He was Chairman of the Soviet of Nationalities from 1958 to 1966.

Party political offices
Preceded by Vilis Lācis	Chairman of the Soviet of Nationalities; March 27, 1958 – August 2, 1966	Succeeded by Justas Paleckis
Preceded by Vilis Lācis	Latvian SSR Chairmen of the Council; 1959–1962	Succeeded by Vitālijs Rubenis
