= List of chairmen of the Council of Ministers of the Latvian Soviet Socialist Republic =

The chairman of the Council of Ministers of the Latvian Soviet Socialist Republic was the second-highest official in the Latvian Soviet Socialist Republic, which was in turn a part of the Soviet Union.

Below is a list of office-holders:

Name	Entered office	Left office
Vilis Lācis (1904–1966)	August 25, 1940	November 27, 1959
Jānis Peive (1906–1976)	November 27, 1959	April 23, 1962
Vitālijs Rubenis (1914–1994)	April 23, 1962	May 5, 1970
Jurijs Rubenis (1925–2004)	May 5, 1970	October 6, 1988
Vilnis Edvīns Bresis (1938–2017)	October 6, 1988	May 7, 1990

== See also ==
- Prime Minister of Latvia

== Sources ==
- World Statesmen – Latvian Soviet Socialist Republic
