= List of chairmen of the Soviet of Nationalities =

The chairman of the Soviet of Nationalities was the presiding officer of the upper chamber of the Supreme Soviet of the Soviet Union.

Image	Name	Period	Representing
	Nikolay Shvernik	January 12, 1938–February 10, 1946	Russian SFSR
	Vasily Kuznetsov	March 12, 1946–June 12, 1950	Russian SFSR
	Zhumabay Shayakhmetov	June 12, 1950–April 20, 1954	Kazakh SSR
	Vilis Lācis	April 20, 1954–March 27, 1958	Latvian SSR
	Jānis Peive	March 27, 1958–August 2, 1966	Latvian SSR
	Justas Paleckis	August 2, 1966–July 14, 1970	Lithuanian SSR
	Yadgar Nasriddinova	July 14, 1970–July 25, 1974	Uzbek SSR
	Vitālijs Rubenis	July 25, 1974–April 11, 1984	Latvian SSR
	Augusts Voss	April 11, 1984–May 25, 1989	Latvian SSR
	Rafiq Nishonov	June 6, 1989–September 5, 1991	Uzbek SSR

== Chairman of the Soviet of the Republics ==
Name	Period	Representing
Anuarbek Alimzhanov	October 29, 1991–December 26, 1991	Kazakh SSR

== See also ==
- List of Chairmen of the Soviet of the Union
