= Uzbek cotton scandal =

1970s–1989 corruption scandal in Uzbek SSR

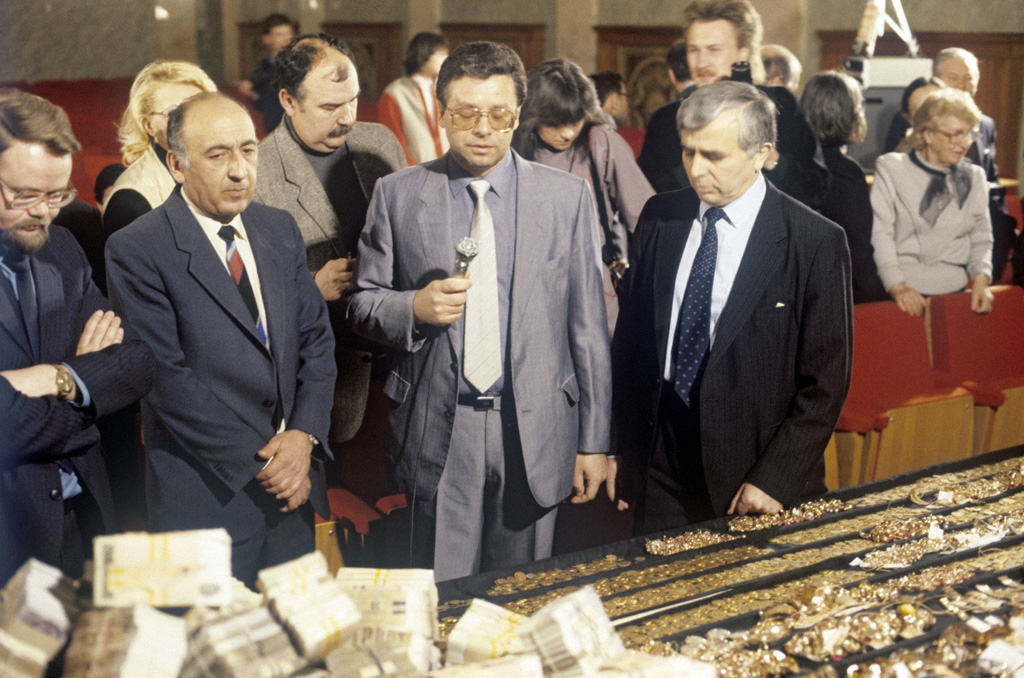
Investigators Telman Gdlyan and Nikolai Ivanov (on left) displaying confiscated wealth to Soviet journalists, 1988

The Uzbek cotton scandal, also known simply as the cotton scandal (Russian: хлопковое дело, Uzbek: paxta ishi) or the Uzbek scandal (Russian: Узбекское дело, Uzbek: oʻzbek ishi), was a widespread corruption scandal in the Uzbek Soviet Socialist Republic beginning during the later years of the rule of Leonid Brezhnev and continuing until 1989.

The criminal trials regarding involvement in the cotton scandal were widely publicised, in an effort to increase public faith in the government following the increased socio-economic imbalances caused by the Era of Stagnation. A total of 800 criminal cases were initiated, and more than 4,000 individuals were found guilty of various charges relating to the scandal.

== Background ==
Sharof Rashidov was appointed as First Secretary of the Communist Party of Uzbekistan on 15 March 1959. Under his rule, the Uzbek Soviet Socialist Republic became a primary source of cotton for the Soviet Union, along with the other Soviet Socialist Republics of Central Asia. By the early 1970s, almost all arable land in the Uzbek SSR had been transformed for usage in cotton farming. Despite an inability to further increase cotton production, the state planning committee, or Gosplan, demanded further increases to production in an effort to avoid importing cotton.

The results were catastrophic; widespread usage of pesticides and toxic fertilisers and a rejection of crop rotation had catastrophic results on the environment. The situation was only worsened by the draining of the Aral Sea in an effort to improve the growth of cotton. Nonetheless, the level of cotton production failed to increase. Pripiski, or an artificial increase of the results of the five-year plans, resulted in millions of dollars being lost, and the unreliability of statistics prevented economic decisions from being made. Despite this, Rashidov maintained control of Uzbekistan, receiving a total of four billion rubles from the Soviet government for non-existent cotton production.

Below Rashidov, widespread corruption existed, as well; the heads of the regional committees of the Uzbek SSR owned large mansions and frequently flaunted the law in their actions. The Ministry of Internal Affairs of the Uzbek SSR was intertwined with organised crime groups, and the 1970s and 1980s marked a peak in the crime rate of Uzbekistan, with murders, thefts, and attacks all being common.

Attempts to investigate the government of Uzbekistan dated back to the mid-1970s. In 1975, efforts to bring perpetrators to justice saw a success as the Chairman of the Supreme Court of the Uzbek SSR was imprisoned. An investigation was also launched into Yadgar Nasriddinova, chair of the Soviet of Nationalities, but this investigation failed to reach a conclusion due to Nasriddinova's significant influence on General Secretary Leonid Brezhnev, with investigator Vladimir Kalinichenko being placed under the protection of Alpha Group in response to threats on his life.

== Early investigations ==
After Leonid Brezhnev died, he was succeeded as General Secretary by Yuri Andropov. Andropov, who was on poor terms with Rashidov, launched an anti-corruption campaign with the intention of restoring public trust in government institutions. The Ministry of Internal Affairs established the Central Scientific Research Laboratory for Identifying and Eliminating Causes and Conditions of Economic Crimes (Note: Russian: Центральная Научно-исследовательская Лаборатория по выявлению и устранению причин и условий способствующих экономическим преступлениям, romanized: Tsentralnaya Nauchno-issledovatelskaya Laboratoriya po vyyavleniyu i ustraneniyu prichin i uslovy sposobstvuyushchikh ekonomicheskim prestupleniyam) or TsNIL (Russian: ЦНИЛ). The TsNIL revealed the full extent of corruption occurring in Central Asia's republics, leading to Andropov to request Rashidov's resignation in January 1983. However, Rashidov refused to resign, and the Central Committee adopted a resolution a month later requesting the Procurator General of the Soviet Union investigate corruption in Uzbekistan.

In April 1983, Telman Gdlyan and Nikolai Veniaminovich Ivanov were placed at the helm of a commission for investigating the cotton scandal by the Procurator General. The same month, two major arrests were made: the head of the OBKhSS in Bukhara Region, A. Muzarafov, was arrested by the KGB after being caught receiving a bribe in a sting operation, and Sh. Kudratov, head of the Bukhara city economic department, was also detained.

Information was being collected on Rashidov; Madyar Khudaibergenov, First Secretary of the Xorazm Regional Committee, admitted under investigation to having paid Rashidov 1.5 million rubles to award him the title of Hero of Socialist Labour. Khudaibergenov was soon released, and reported that Xorazm Region had harvested 300,000 tonnes of cotton. When Rashidov met with Andropov, however, he did not receive the expected praise, instead being told that the Soviet government would look into the harvest.

== Rashidov's death and continuing investigations ==
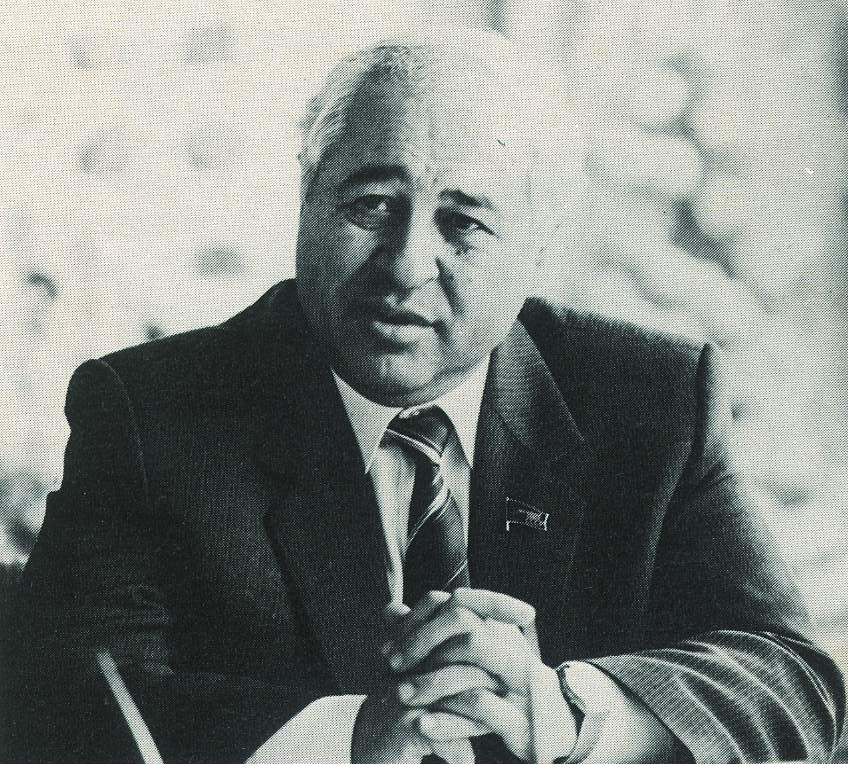
Inomjon Usmonxoʻjayev, the First Secretary of Uzbekistan succeeding Rashidov, had ties to and support from Ligachyov

On 31 October 1983, Rashidov died suddenly (or, alternatively, committed suicide in fear of imprisonment), and was buried in central Tashkent. Plans were made to construct a memorial complex, intended to become a site of pilgrimage for workers. Following his death, investigations continued, with the Moscow and Moscow Oblast divisions of the KGB making arrests of directors of cotton factories from Uzbekistan and in the Russian Soviet Federative Socialist Republic throughout early 1984.

In the summer of 1984, a delegation of Central Committee officials led by Yegor Ligachyov arrived in Tashkent to elect a successor to Rashidov. At the meeting of the Communist Party of Uzbekistan, Rashidov was described by officials as a "despot", corrupt, and as someone who had done irreparable damage to the Uzbek nation. By the decision of the plenum, Rashidov was exhumed from central Tashkent and reburied in the city's Chagatai Cemetery. The new First Secretary was Inomjon Usmonxoʻjayev, a relatively unknown person who had ties both to bribery investigations and Ligachyov.

On 11 August 1984, Abduvohid Karimov, former head of the Bukhara Regional Committee, was arrested in Qarshi and flown to Moscow, where he was interned at Lefortovo Prison until his 1987 trial. At the trial, Karimov testified that he had given massive bribes to Rashidov, and was sentenced to 20 years' imprisonment. Investigators discovered a notebook written by Karimov, revealing places that his wealth had been hidden in the village of Sevaz, near Shahrisabz. 10 million rubles worth of valuables and cash were found in the village. Around the same time, Ahmadjon Odilov, a local kolkhoz chairman and politician in Namangan Region, was arrested. Odilov had extensive ties to Rashidov, as well as to organised crime networks in Uzbekistan.

Arrested individuals who were members of the Ministry of Internal Affairs testified about the widespread bribery and organised crime connections within the Uzbek intelligence services. When KGB officers went to arrest K. Ergashev, head of the Ministry of Internal Affairs, he committed suicide, having possibly been tipped off beforehand. In his home, 10 million rubles in cash were found. As a result of further investigations, the Ministry of Internal Affairs' connections to organised crime groups were subsequently revealed.

At the same time, an investigation was ongoing into the entourage of Ruzmet Gaipov, First Secretary of the Qashqadaryo Regional Committee. In April 1985, permission was granted by General Secretary Mikhail Gorbachev to arrest Gaipov, after information about him having supported the rise of Ergashev and received bribes from people throughout the region came to light. However, when police arrived at his home, they found him dead, having either committed suicide or been murdered. The documents collected after Gaipov's death nonetheless allowed for further expansion of the investigation. Gaipov's son Arslan Ruzmetov, head of the Tashkent Airport, head of the Bukhara Regional Ministry of Internal Affairs M. Norov, and Norov's deputy T. Kakhramanov were all detained, in addition to many others.

== Investigations reach the Kremlin ==
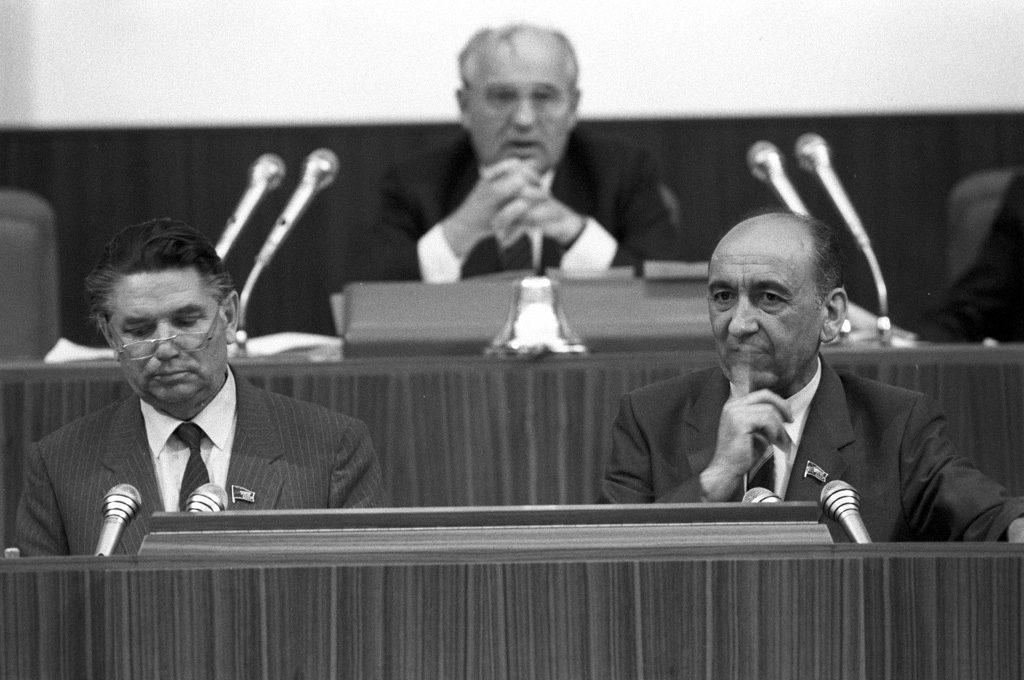
Gdlyan (on right) and Mikhail Gorbachev (in background) at the first Congress of People's Deputies of the Soviet Union, 1989

By 1985, Gdlyan and Ivanov's investigation had uncovered concrete evidence of an organised group within party structures in Uzbekistan. Gorbachev sent Boris Yeltsin, secretary of the Central Committee, to review the investigation in September 1985. After a week in Tashkent, Yeltsin returned as a supporter of Gdlyan and Ivanov's efforts. More than that, he had been convinced of Gdlyan and Ivanov's position that Usmonxoʻjayev needed to be removed as First Secretary and included in anti-corruption investigations. Gorbachev refused, citing Ligachyov's support of Usmonxoʻjayev.

As investigations continued, however, evidence of Usmonxoʻjayev's involvement became increasingly evident. Gorbachev eventually agreed to his removal in January 1988 and replaced him with Rafiq Nishonov. As part of glasnost and perestroika, the cotton scandal was further publicised, resulting in a 23 January 1988 article in Pravda revealing the full extent of corruption to the public. The Soviet government additionally announced its intention to end the practise of using child labour to farm cotton in Uzbekistan. At the same time, another wave of arrests was occurring; this time, Qallibek Kamolov, head of the Karakalpakstan Regional Committee and an in-law of Rashidov, was among those arrested, as well as Narmaxonmadi Xudoyberdiyev, former chairman of the Council of Ministers of the Uzbek SSR. Xudoyberdiyev admitted his guilt, and handed over 514,000 rubles he had received in bribes to the authorities.

Eventually, the investigation's focus reached beyond Uzbekistan, going up to the Soviet leadership. Georgy Razumovsky, Ligachyov, Mikhail Solomentsev, and Viktor Grishin were all suspected of taking bribes in order to turn a blind eye to ongoing corruption. Yuri Churbanov, Brezhnev's son-in-law, was also arrested on accusations of corruption and bribe-taking. Additional concerns were raised about Gorbachev, who had been secretary of the Central Committee for agriculture in 1983. In that year alone, 981,000 tonnes of cotton were reported as being harvested when they did not exist. For this, 757 million rubles were given to the Uzbek SSR's government, of which 286 million disappeared.

On 19 January 1989, Gdlyan and Ivanov held a press conference in Moscow. At the conference, they revealed the breadth of corruption involved, including the country's leadership. The public responded with shock, and the Communist Party of the Soviet Union moved swiftly in an effort to silence them. A special commission of the Central Committee was established under the guidance of Boris Pugo, with the stated intention of "check[ing] the facts ... about violations of the law in the investigation of cases of corruption in the Uzbek SSR and the report on the results to the Central Committee of the CPSU." A similar commission was established in the Supreme Soviet of the Soviet Union. The Inter-regional Deputies Group, an alliance of anti-communist and pro-democratic People's Deputies, responded to efforts by the government to silence the two by choosing them as People's Deputies, thus granting them both parliamentary immunity. Gdlyan was expelled from the CPSU and office of Procurator General in 1990.

The imprisonment of corrupt officials did not last long. On 25 December 1991, a day before the dissolution of the Soviet Union, Uzbek leader Islam Karimov pardoned all individuals involved in the scandal who had been imprisoned in Uzbekistan.

== See also ==
- Mubarek zone
- Soviet fish mafia
- Soviet fur mafia
