= Telman Gdlyan =

Soviet and Russian statesman of Armenian origin

- Թելման Գդլյան
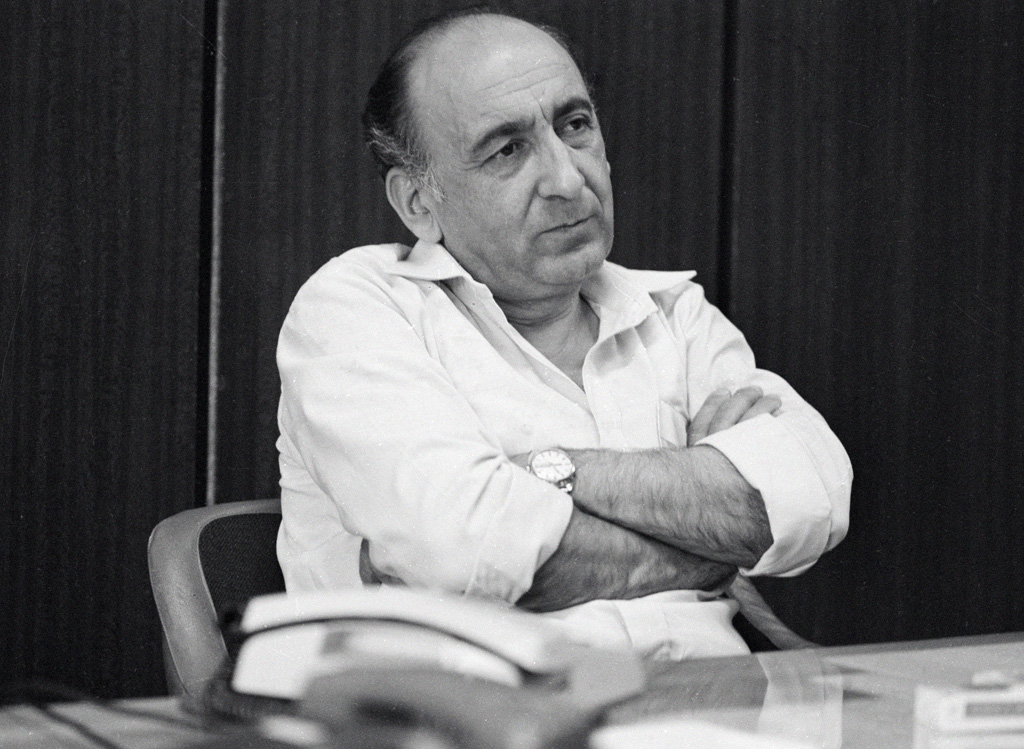
- Telman Gdlyan, 18 August 1988.
- Born: December 20, 1940 (age 85); Samsar village, Akhalkalaki Municipality, Georgian SSR, USSR
- Citizenship: Soviet Union and Russia
- Education: Saratov State Academy of Law
- Occupations: politician, criminal investigator, member of the State Duma
- Political party: Communist Party of the Soviet Union
- Spouse: Susanna Hakobovna
- Children: 2
- Awards

Telman Khorenovich Gdlyan (Russian: Те́льман Хоре́нович Гдлян Armenian: Թելման Խորենի Գդլյան, romanized: Telman Khoreni Gdlyan) is a Soviet and Russian public and statesman of Armenian origin.

He is best known for his work as part of the investigative group of the USSR Prosecutor General's Office (the "Gdlyan-Ivanov group"), which investigated corruption in the highest echelons of power in Uzbekistan and began collecting evidence of bribery by senior leaders of the USSR. He lives in Moscow.

== Biography ==
Telman was born on December 20, 1940 in the village of Samsar in the family of farmer Khoren Gdlyan. He was named Telman in honor of the German revolutionary Ernst Thälmann. After graduating from school, in 1959-1962 he entered the service in the Armed Forces of the USSR. For his discipline and excellent service during his service in the Saratov region, he was presented by the ranks of the CPSU as a candidate for membership. In 1962, Gdlyan was accepted into the ranks of the Communist Party of the Soviet Union. In 1964 -1968, he studied at the Saratov Law Institute.

After graduating from the institute, he received a law degree and started working as an investigator at the prosecutor's office in Baryshsky District. Two years later, he was transferred to the Zavolzhsky region of Ulyanovsk city with the same position. Here, within two years, Gdlyan became a senior investigator of the prosecutor's office of the city of Ulyanovsk and worked in that position for seven years.

== Uzbek cotton scandal ==
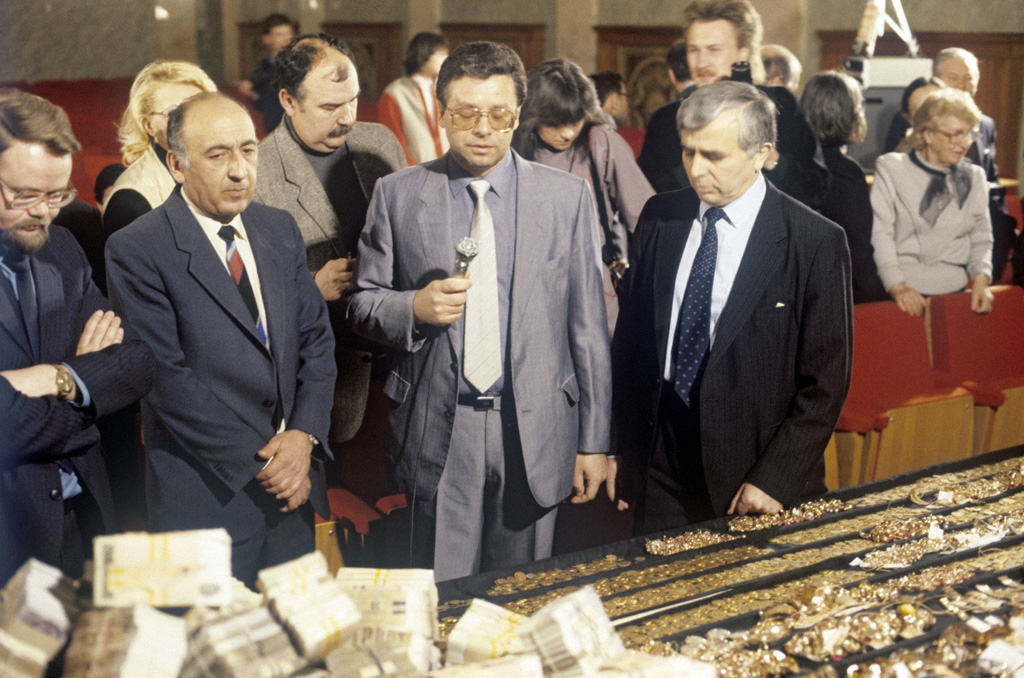
Investigators Telman Gdlyan and Nikolai Ivanov (on left) displaying confiscated wealth to Soviet journalists, 1988.

In 1983 Gdlyan was appointed to the post of senior investigator for especially important cases under the Prosecutor General of the USSR. He became known for his participation in the investigation of the "cotton case" (although, according to Vladimir Kalinichenko, "Gdlyan, who is often credited with the "cotton case", was never involved in it and had nothing to do with it"). As part of this case, the head of the agro-industrial association Akhmadzhan Adylov, a number of Uzbek ministers and party leaders were arrested, the 1st secretary of the Central Committee of the Communist Party of the Uzbek SSR and the chairman of the Council of Ministers of the Uzbek SSR were removed from office (in 1988), and the "strange" suicides of Ruzmet Gaipov and Deputy Minister of Internal Affairs of the Uzbek SSR Davydov occurred.

In 1983 Gdlyan was made head of a special unit of the USSR Procuracy assigned to investigate the Uzbek Mafia, and his partner Nikolai Ivanov was his chief assistant. Their group, which grew to as many as two hundred investigators at one point, worked on the Uzbek cases for about five years. The results of their efforts were considerable uncovered widespread corruption involving the falsification of cotton quotas by Uzbek officials.

Gdlyan and his team started their inquiry in Bukhara Viloyat, and the probe quickly spread to the administrators and officials of several other regions. The corruption extended to Moscow itself, as Yuri Churbanov, Leonid Brezhnev's son-in-law, was also deeply involved in the scam. After the ascension of Mikhail Gorbachev to the post of general secretary of the Communist Party in 1985, Gdlyan and Ivanov accelerated their investigation, bringing more charges against a number of figures, most of whom were ethnic Uzbeks.

In 1988, the first party secretary of the Uzbek SSR, Inamjan Usmankhodzhayev, was removed from his post primarily over the scandal. In Uzbekistan, the investigators were seen as villains, bent on an ethnic witch hunt, but in other parts of the USSR they were hailed as heroes. Ironically, Gdlyan himself was found by a review panel to have overstepped his authority, and a number of those he had prosecuted were released. After the collapse of the USSR. he went into politics and was elected to the Russian Duma.

== Cancellation of Gdlyan ==
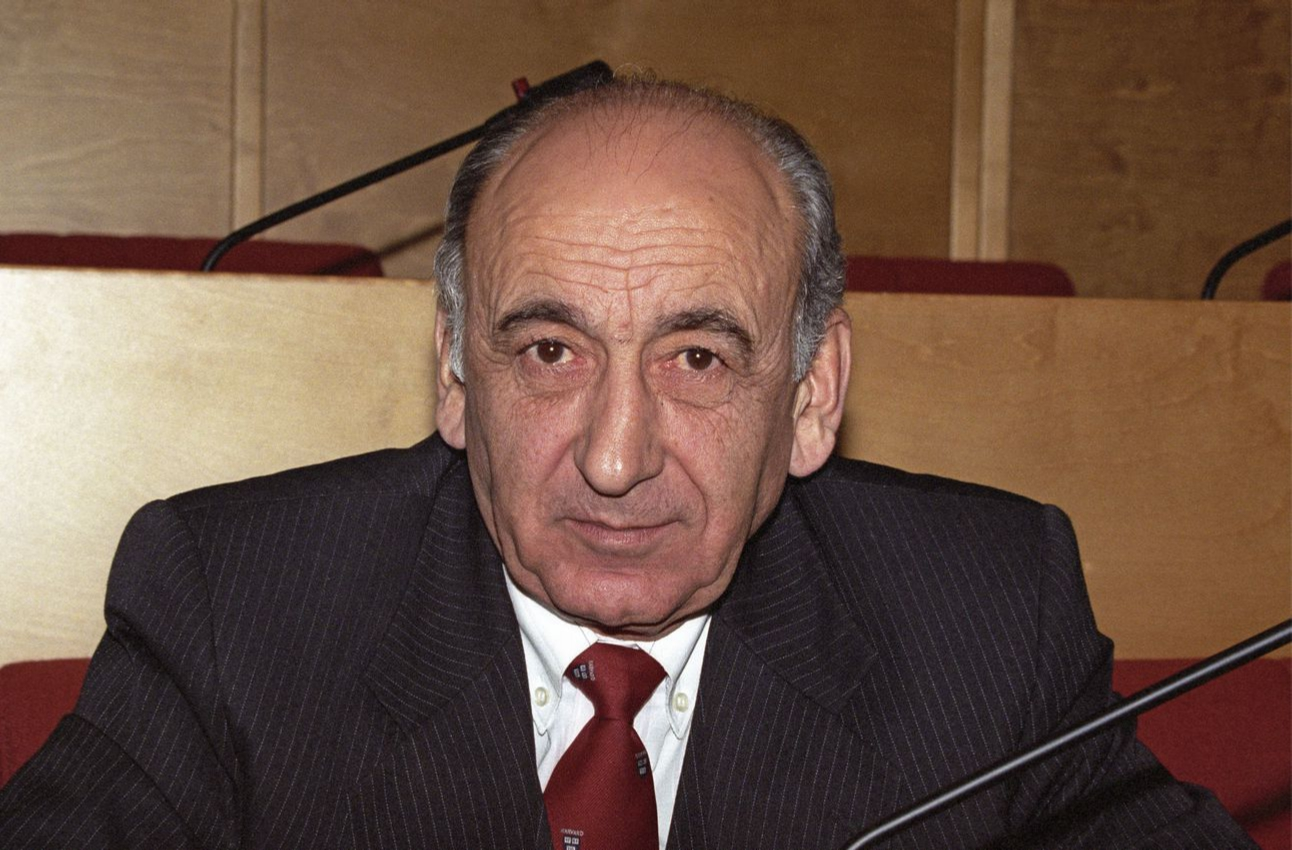
Gdlyan in 1997.

A new scandal broke in mid-May when deputy Telman Gdlyan came under criticism. To the electorate, Gdlyan's name was associated with the fight against corruption and the exposure of bribery and embezzlement in the highest echelons of power. At the same time, Gdlyan was renowned for rather hard and not always correct methods of conducting his investigations. In the USSR Supreme Court there had been a five-year struggle for a review of the case of Estonian inventor Johannes Hint, who had died in jail while awaiting rehabilitation.

Hint had been accused of multifarious intrigues but the investigation team, headed in its final stages by Gdlyan, working for the USSR Prosecutor's Office, had been unable to gather convincing evidence. And so final rehabilitation, already post- humous, had been awaited for a very long time. The Supreme Court's final decision not only referred to Hint's innocence but also directly condemned Gdlyan who was dismissed from his job with the Prosecutor's Office immediately afterwards. A number of employees of the Prosecutor's Office from Gdlyan and Ivanov's team were dismissed from their positions.

In May 1989, the USSR Prosecutor's Office opened a criminal case against Gdlyan and Nikolai Ivanov for violating the law during investigations in Uzbekistan (former USSR Prosecutor General Alexander Sukharev accused Gdlyan and Ivanov of obtaining testimony through threats and falsifying cases in 2011, and noted: "When I was Prosecutor General, my last case was the case of Gdlyan and Ivanov. They, employees of the prosecutor's office, took the path of corruption. This was a matter of honor for me, although they were already deputies of the Supreme Soviet at the time".

Finally, on July 12, 1991, USSR Prosecutor General Nikolai Trubin signed a letter on behalf of Mikhail Gorbachev asserting that sufficient evidence against Gdlyan and Ivanov had now been accumulated to charge the two with the crime of exceeding their official powers. The case was closed in August 1991 "due to a change in the political situation".

In February 1990, he was expelled from the CPSU. In April, the Supreme Soviet of the USSR condemned the “unsubstantiated statements of the USSR People’s Deputies Gdlyan and Ivanov”. In April, Gdlyan was dismissed from his position as senior investigator for especially important cases at the Prosecutor General of the USSR.
