= Vilis Lācis =

Latvian writer and politician

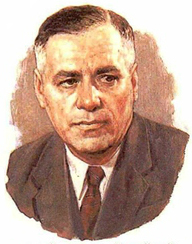
- Born: 12 May 1904; Vecmīlgrāvis, Governorate of Livonia, Russian Empire
- Died: 6 February 1966 (aged 61); Riga, Latvian SSR, Soviet Union
- Burial place: Forest Cemetery, Riga
- Occupations: Writer, politician
- Political party: Communist Party of the Soviet Union
- Spouses: Marija Bute (m. 1927–1944) Velta Kalpiņa (m. 1944)
- Children: 5

Vilis Lācis (born Jānis Vilhelms Lāce (Old orthography: Jahn Wilhelm Lahze) on 12 May 1904, died 6 February 1966) was a Latvian writer and communist politician.

== Biography ==
Jānis Vilhelms Lāce was born into a working-class family in Vecmīlgrāvis (now part of Riga). During World War I, his family fled to the Altai region in Siberia, where Lācis studied at the pedagogical seminary in Barnaul. In 1921, Lācis returned to Riga and at various times worked as a fisherman, port worker, ship's fireman and librarian while writing in his free time. In 1933, he published his hugely successful novel Zvejnieka dēls ('Fisherman's Son'), making him one of the most popular and commercially successful Latvian writers of the 1930s. His novels have been characterized as popular fiction, not always liked by highbrow critics, but widely read by ordinary people.

Throughout this period, Lācis maintained underground ties to the officially banned Communist Party of Latvia. Due to his political activities, Lācis was under periodic surveillance by the Latvian Political Department. Eventually, Lācis became a favorite of Latvian president Kārlis Ulmanis, who personally ordered the destruction of the surveillance files on Lācis. Lācis wrote newspaper editorials highly favorable of the Ulmanis regime, while remaining a Communist supporter, and Ulmanis's government generously funded Lācis's writing and a film adaptation of Fisherman's Son. In the Latvian Soviet Socialist Republic, eight films based on Lācis's works were produced, including a new adaptation of Fisherman's Son in 1957.

After Latvia was occupied and forcefully incorporated in the USSR in August 1940, Lācis became Chairman of the Council of Ministers of the Latvian SSR (nominally, Prime Minister) and served in this position from 1940 to 1959. When Nazi Germany occupied Latvia from 1941 to 1944, Lācis was evacuated to Moscow, where he continued to write in a socialist realist style. He was regarded mostly as a figurehead, as most of the actual decisions were made by the Central Committee of the Communist Party. As first Minister of the Interior and then Chairman of the Supreme Soviet, he is seen as personally responsible for the Soviet deportations from Latvia.

From 1954 to 1958, Lācis also served as Chairman of the Soviet of Nationalities. He was awarded the Order of Lenin seven times and the Stalin Prize twice, in 1949 and 1952.

Lācis's books have been translated into more than 50 languages, with the most numerous translations into Russian. He remains the most translated Latvian writer. He was among the contributors of semi-official literary magazine Karogs.

Party political offices
Preceded by None	Chairman of the Council of Ministers of the Latvian Soviet Socialist Republic; 25 August 1940 – 27 November 1959	Succeeded by Jānis Peive
Preceded by Zhumabay Shayakhmetov	Chairman of the Soviet of Nationalities; 20 April 1954 – 27 March 1958	Succeeded by Jānis Peive
