= Kenes Aukhadiev =

Kazakh politician (1938–2022)

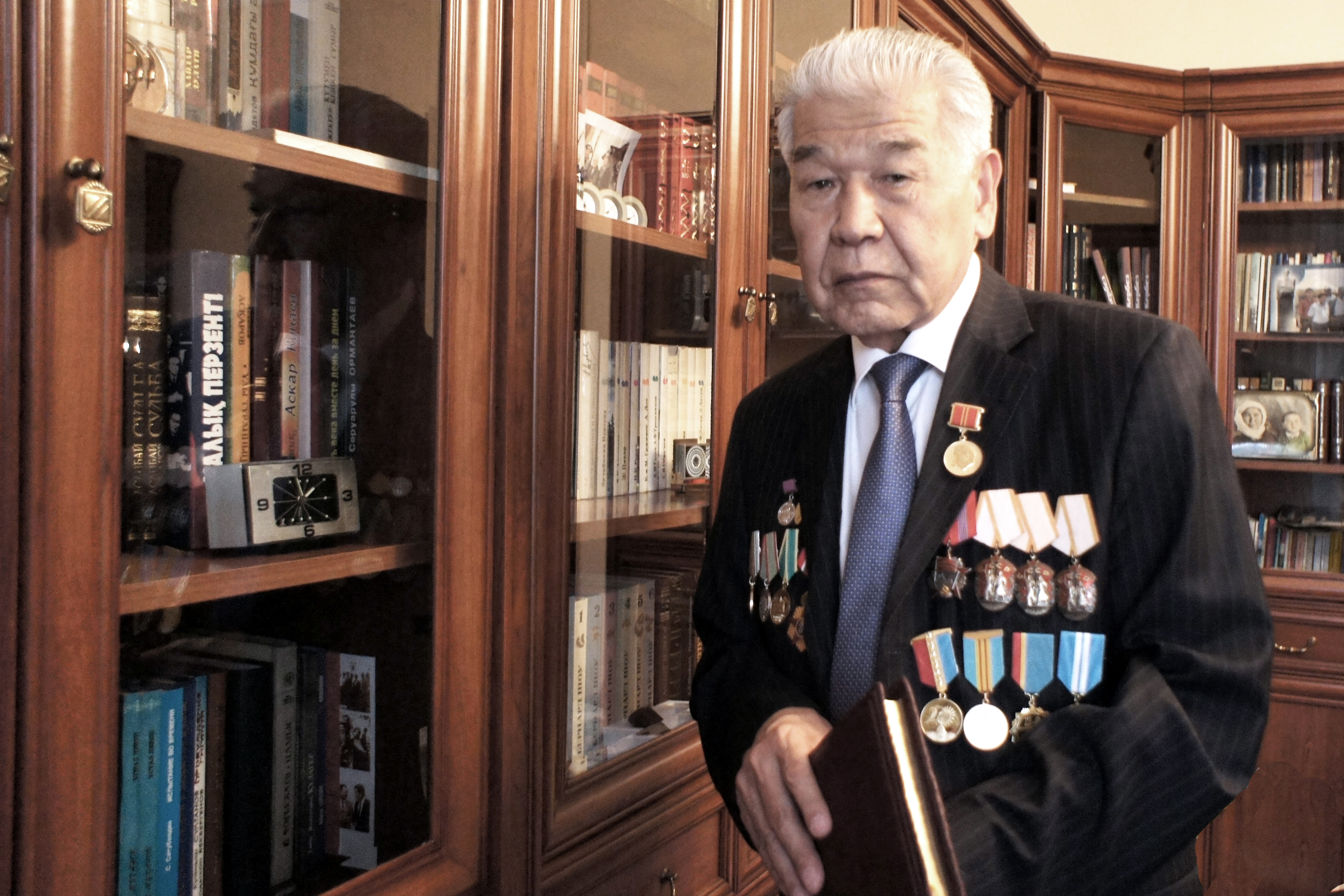

First Secretary of the Alma-Ata Regional Committee of the Communist Party of Kazakhstan
- In office 28 April 1978 – 29 September 1985
- Preceded by: Asanbay Askarov
- Succeeded by: Marat Mendybayev

Personal details
- Born: Aukhadiev Kenes Mustakhanovich; 27 December 1938 Akyn Kalka, Koksu District, Kazakh SSR, Soviet Union
- Died: 23 January 2022 (aged 83)
- Party: CPSU
- Education: Kazakh National Agrarian University

Aukhadiev Kenes Mustakhanovich (Kazakh: Аухадиев Кеңес Мұстаханұлы; 27 December 1938 – 23 January 2022) was a Soviet-Kazakh politician. A member of the Communist Party, he served as First Secretary of the Alma-Ata Regional Committee of the Communist Party of Kazakhstan from 1978 to 1985. He died on 23 January 2022, at the age of 83.
