= Vitālijs Rubenis =

Soviet politician (1914–1994)

Vitālijs Rubenis (26 February 1914, Moscow – 20 January 1994, Moscow) was a Latvian communist politician. He was born in the Russian Empire. He was Chairman of the Soviet of Nationalities from 1974 to 1984. He was a member of the Communist Party of Latvia. He was a recipient of three Orders of Lenin, an Order of the October Revolution, Order of the Red Banner of Labour, and Order of the Badge of Honour.

Party political offices
Preceded by Jānis Peive	Latvian SSR Chairmen of the Council; 1962–1970	Succeeded by Jurijs Rubenis
Preceded by Yadgar Sadikovna Nasriddinova	Chairman of the Soviet of Nationalities; July 25, 1974 – April 11, 1984	Succeeded by Augusts Voss
