= Boris Balmont =

Russian politician (1927–2022)

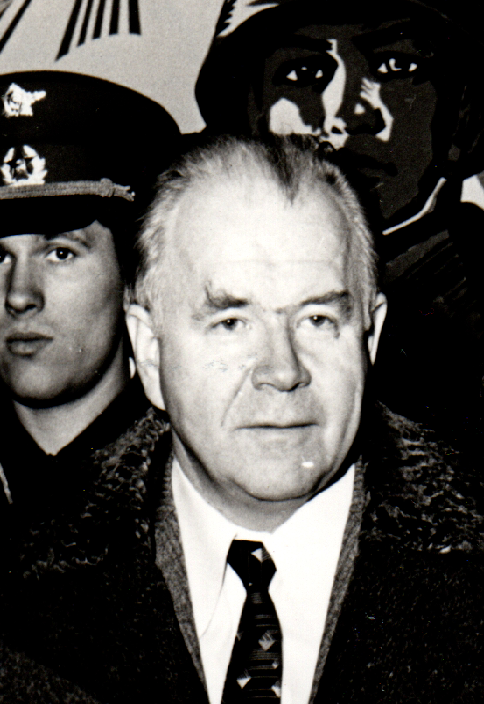
Balmont in 1981

Boris Vladimirovich Balmont (6 October 1927 – 16 February 2022) was a Russian politician.

He was Minister of the Machine Tool and Tool Industry of the USSR from 1981 to 1986. Member of the Presidium of the Russian Academy of Cosmonautics. He died on 16 February 2022, at the age of 94.
