= HMS Ant =

Six ships of the Royal Navy have borne the name HMS Ant:

- HMS Ant was an 8-gun schooner, formerly the French Arabe, captured 1797 and renamed HMS Arab, renamed Ant 1798, sold 1815.
- HMS Ant (1815) was a 2-gun cutter, launched 1815, used as a tender, in dockyard service from 1817, later as Royal Victoria Yard Craft No.1, sold 1869.
- HMS Ant (1856) was a Cheerful-class gunboat, launched 1856, broken up 1869.
- HMS Ant (1862) was a gunboat, ex-merchant ship, bought 1862, used on the New Zealand station, sold 1864.
- HMS Ant (1873) was an Ant-class gunboat launched 1873, used as boom defence vessel 1917, as target 1921, broken up 1926.
- HMS Ant (1913) was a tender, launched 1913, sold 1924, converted to excursion steamer Rangitoto in New Zealand, broken up 1968.
