= Alma-Ata Regional Committee of the Communist Party of Kazakhstan =

The Alma-Ata Regional Committee of the Communist Party of Kazakhstan was the position of highest authority in the city of Alma Ata in the Kazakh SSR in the USSR. The position was created on March 10, 1932, and abolished on September 7, 1991. The First Secretary was a de facto appointed position usually by the Politburo or the General Secretary himself.

== List of First Secretaries of the Regional Committee ==
Name	Term of Office	
Name	Start	End
First Secretaries of the Oblast Committee of the Communist Party
Izmuhan Kuramysov	June 1932	1933
Konstantin Tobol	1933	1934
Andrey Kiselyov	1934	1937
Dzhanaydar Sadvokasov	1937	?
Chakpak Artykbayev	1937	1938
Wolfe Minenberg	1938	?
Nikolai Sadovnikov	1938	1940
Jack Kulitov	1940	1943
Nikolai Bogolyubov	S1943	1944
Nurmukhamed Bozzhanov	1944	?
Dzhakip Dzhangozin	1945	1951
Amir Kanapin	1951	1954
Seytgaly Dzhakipov	1954	?
Onufry Shpanov	1954	1955
Rymbek Ilyashev	1955	1957
Gregory Galaydin	1957	1958
Masimhan Beysebayev	1958	1962
Rahim Baigaliyev	1962	?
Pyotr Kantselyaristov, Nikolai Dykhne	January 1963	December 1964
Sabir Niyazbekov	December 1964	April 1965
Asanbay Askarov	April 1965	April 27, 1978
Kenes Aukhadiev	April 27, 1978	September 24, 1985
Marat Mendybayev	September 24, 1985	1988
Kasym Tyulebekov	1988	September 7, 1991

== See also ==
- Communist Party of the Soviet Union
- Communist Party of Kazakhstan
- Almaty
