= Tatyana Ivanova (politician) =

Soviet politician (born 1940)

Tatyana Georgievna Ivanova (born January 4, 1940, in Moscow) was a Soviet-Russian politician (Communist). She graduated from Moscow State University and was vice-chairperson of the Presidium of the Supreme Soviet from 1985 to 1990.
