= Shadow economy of Russia =

The shadow economy (Russian: Теневая экономика) is one of the most controversial aspects of Russia's economic history. In 2011, according to official Rosstat estimates calculated using the GDP adjustment method, the degree of shadowization of the Russian economy was about 16% of GDP, with a turnover of about 7 trillion rubles a year. About 13 million people were involved in the shadow sectors of the economy; according to independent experts, 22 million Russians are employed in the informal sector.

To calculate the share of the shadow economy in the country's GDP, the State Statistics Committee of Russia usually proceeds from the ratio to GDP of income from hidden and informal economic activities permitted by law. This technique complies with the recommendations of international organizations. It should be taken into account that the concept of hidden and informal production in statistics differs from the indicators of the shadow economy used to calculate the taxable base (Russian: Налоговая база).

The dynamics of the volumes of the shadow sector in the Russian economy is characterized by complex processes. The shadow economy existed in the Russian Empire and in the USSR, then became even more widespread in the post-perestroika period. Thus, in the early 1990s, informal and illegal economic activities became widespread. However, given that the country's GDP was declining, market demands were modest, and available technologies were extremely primitive, the share of the informal economy was easier to estimate.

In the 2000s, a massive exit of large capitals from the shadow began, which was associated with the rapid growth of the economy and its increasing openness. At the same time, the technological structure of the economy has become more complex as consumer demand has become more complex, the emergence of offshore zones and other factors, which means that the efficiency of calculating the informal and illegal sectors has also decreased.

== See also ==
- Second economy of the Soviet Union
- Informal economy of China
