= Nina Pereverzeva =

Russian farmer and politician (1929–2022)

Member of the Congress of the Communist Party of the Soviet Union
- In office 24 February 1976 – 6 March 1986

Member of the Central Committee of the Communist Party of the Soviet Union
- In office 1982–1990

Personal details
- Born: Nina Vasilyevna Pereverzeva; 8 March 1929 Letnik, Salsk Okrug, North Caucasus Krai, Russian SFSR, Soviet Union
- Died: 1 April 2022 (aged 93)
- Party: CPSU
- Occupation: Farmer

Nina Vasilyevna Pereverzeva (Russian: Ни́на Васи́льевна Переве́рзева; 8 March 1929 – 1 April 2022) was a Soviet and Russian politician and farmer. A member of the Communist Party of the Soviet Union, she served on its Central Committee from 1982 to 1990. She died on 1 April 2022, at the age of 93.

== Awards ==
- Order of the Red Banner of Labour (1972)
- Hero of Socialist Labour (1973)
- Two Orders of Lenin (1973, 1976)
- Order of the October Revolution (1976)
- USSR State Prize (1977)
