= The Ants (play) =

2023 play by Ramiz Monsef

- Original language: English
- Written by: Ramiz Monsef

Premiere
- Date: 2023
- Place: Geffen Playhouse

The Ants is a 2023 American play written by Ramiz Monsef.

== Synopsis ==
A high tech house on a hill with state-of-the-art security is a refuge for Nami, whose recent eviction forces him to crash at his brother and sister-in-law's luxury home, when a violent uprising outside leaves the three trapped.

== Critical reception ==
Daily Bruin wrote "The horror of “The Ants” proves more fulfilling than jump scares, as audience members are consistently enthralled by the story's nail-biting possible outcomes."
