= Microsoft Ants =

Multiplayer strategy game

Microsoft Ants was a multiplayer strategy game for 2 to 4 players on the Microsoft Gaming Zone. It was released on the MSN gaming Zone in October 1998. The game was themed around the concept of ants competing to make their nests thrive. On January 31, 2006, Microsoft's Zone retired Ants due to a lack of players.

== Gameplay ==
The objective of the game was to obtain the most points by the end of the game. Points could be obtained by eating or stealing food from other players, often by making use of the various power-ups available. Each player began at a nest with a pre-programmed number of ants. The ants were to move around the game-field and bring back pieces of food to their home nest, such as candy, cookies, Twinkies, etc. with each piece increasing the player's points. The game ended when a time limit ran out, and the winner was determined based on the number of points earned.

== History ==
Microsoft Ants was created in 1996 as a proprietary game for Microsoft's MSN service. At this time, MSN was the online service that was integrated into Microsoft Windows and could be accessed by selecting the MSN icon on the desktop.

After newer versions were released on AOL and Prodigy Internet (an upgraded version of Prodigy), Microsoft upgraded MSN with a new layout powered by ActiveX called "onstage". Part of this service included a new section for kids and game fans. It was called "Spike's World of Games," or "Spike's World Online Game Magazine."

Spike's World featured games such as Scrawl, a popular game-show type game, and Ants. Microsoft Ants premiered in early 1997 as a real-time strategy game. Ants was an attempt to display Microsoft's technological ability, and it was paired for download along with DirectX 3.

During this time, Steve Murch, a then-employee of Microsoft, convinced Bill Gates to acquire a small online game site (then owned by Electric Gravity). Between 1996 and 1997, Murch worked on modernizing the site and adding—and sometimes remaking—new games. Joshua Howard, also an employee at Microsoft in what would later be the MSN Gaming Zone department, petitioned Microsoft to make the movement of Ants onto their servers a priority, and eventually Ants became one of the original games to be tested and officially inducted (though slightly manipulated) into the newly remade Internet Gaming Zone.

In the late summer of 1998, the Internet Gaming Zone was made a part of MSN and was renamed the Microsoft Gaming Zone. At this point, since the "onstage" part of MSN and "Spike's World of Games" were gone, there was no way to play Ants. In October 1998, after several code changes, which included modification to images and existing maps, Microsoft premiered Ants as one of the games available to play on its servers. The game was launched for free and available to play online after a download of integrated software for anyone who wanted to play it. Shortly after Ants was officially on Microsoft servers, Joshua Howard left Microsoft to work elsewhere, and would not become involved in Ants again until returning to MSN Gaming Zone several years later.

Ants soon became popular on the Internet Gaming Zone, or as it would become colloquially known - "The Zone". This was due in part, from several fans following the game from its movement from Spike's World. As The Zone was still largely within its infancy, the majority of players wished for an accessible game. Ants largely met these criteria, as a game could take less than twelve minutes, was generally accessible and easy to understand for children whilst still having strategic elements that could further entertain an adult audience.

== Status ==
In 2000, Microsoft Ants was the target of several hackers, who attempted to breach the Microsoft Gaming Zone servers. Ants was often used as a testing ground for these hackers, due to its outdated code.

In early 2004 Joshua Howard announced that Microsoft Ants would eventually be taken off Microsoft Gaming Zone servers, and not released to anyone else or the general public. This led to attempts by the Ants fanbase to create a spinoff, titled "Ants 2". Microsoft would later threaten lawsuits over copyright, leading the project to be abandoned.

Microsoft moved Ants to a different section of the Microsoft Gaming Zone. Until January 2006, Ants still remained on Microsoft servers. It could be found once signed into a .NET Passport.

Due to users being booted offline, lagged, hung up, frozen, or attacked, many Ants players left to find other sites to spend their time on; or migrated to other games on Microsoft Zone with less frequent interruptions from Denial of Service attacks. Collectively, Ants suffered a drastic decline in population starting in early 2003 which continued until its removal in 2006.

Many users also had issues when using internet routers with Microsoft Ants. Since the game was not designed nor coded for the new wave of cable and DSL connections with people sharing their connection, the actual computer name instead of the signed-on MSN/Passport name would appear in the game's start screen. In most cases, players were unable to connect to each other while using a router, even after trying to connect with open router ports. This further lead to a decline in players.

On January 31, 2006, Microsoft's Zone retired Ants due to a lack of players.
