= Jurijs Rubenis =

Latvian politician

Jurijs Rubenis (15 April 1925, Mogilev – 14 March 2004, Riga) was a Latvian communist politician who served as the penultimate Chairman of the Council of Ministers (head of government) for the Latvian SSR from 1970 to 1988. He was a member of the Communist Party of Latvia.

Preceded by Vitālijs Rubenis	Latvian SSR Chairmen of the Council; 1970–1988	Succeeded by Vilnis Edvīns Bresis
