= ANT case =

The ANT case (also AST case) was a resonance criminal case in early 1990s about an alleged attempt of smuggling of T-72 tanks abroad by the cooperative ANT (Russian: "АНТ": Автоматика, Наука, Технология, translated as AST: "Automation. Science. Technology"). On January 11, 1990, the tarpaulin-covered tanks on twelve platforms were found on the access railroads at the Novorossiysk station declared as tractors in the accompanying documents. The cooperative was set up under the patronage of KGB. The investigations quickly sizzled. There were rumors and some evidence about involvement of high KGB officials: ANT was given significant rights for import and export without any licensing. The chairman of ANT, Vladimir Ryashentsev, escaped to the United States, where he engaged in commerce. In 1993 the investigation was discontinued and apologies were issued to Ryashentsev, but he did not return.

On October 15, 1991, Russian TV aired two interviews: one with the investigators, another one was with Ryahentsev in his Budapest office of Rossiysky Dom ("Russian House") set up after the closure of ANT. There Ryashentsev presented the documents about the order for the refurbishment of tanks as tractors, but somehow they were shipped with no work done. However the investigators claimed (and provided proofs) that Ryashentsev knew that they were actual tanks. Later Ryahentsev suggested that it was a provocation targeting reforms of Ryzhkov and Gorbachev. The latter claim (anti-Gorbachev's reforms conspiracy) was also voiced by other media.
