= Fish case =

Corruption and smuggling scandal in the Soviet Union

The fish case (Russian: рыбное дело, romanized: rybnoe delo, IPA: [ˈrɨbnəjə ˈdʲelə]) or caviar case (Russian: икорное дело, romanized: ikornoe delo, IPA: [ɪˈkornəjə dʲelə]) in the USSR was a series of corruption, misappropriation, and smuggling cases related to fish trade uncovered in 1978. The organized crime group in question is sometimes referred to as the (Soviet) fish mafia.

The implicated officials, including several major functionaries of the Soviet Ministry of the Fishing Industry, were found to be misappropriating a share of the proceeds of fish sales, taking an advantage of the inherently inexact accounting of the fish catch. The illegal operations also involved smuggling caviar out of the country in tins falsely labeled as containing cheap fish. The involved officials amassed large fortunes of foreign hard currency via the smuggling operations, which they hid in foreign European banks or spent, in large sums, on expensive Western goods. The affair was uncovered due to a purchase of an intentionally mislabeled tin from the "Okean" fish store chain, where some of the tins accidentally ended up.

About 200 members of the Ministry of the Fishing Industry were arrested, and the deputy minister Vladimir Rytov was executed by shooting in 1982. The minister himself, Aleksandr Ishkov, was implicated, however Leonid Brezhnev personally intervened and Ishkov was simply fired and forced into retirement.

In 2009 a documentary Золотая рыбка. Дело «Океан» was released in Russia.

== See also ==
- Soviet fur mafia
- Corruption in the Soviet Union
- Sochi-Krasnodar case, another major corruption case, developed out of the "fish case".
