= Second economy of the Soviet Union =

Economic activity, other than government-mandated production and services, in the USSR

The second economy of the Soviet Union was the black market or the informal sector of the economy of the Soviet Union.

== Definition ==
The term was suggested by Gregory Grossman in his 1977 seminal article, "The Second Economy of the USSR". Economist Gerard Roland notes that as Grossman anticipated, "the logic of the second economy tended over time to undermine the logic of the command system and to lead to expanding black markets". This prediction was corroborated by the long-term analysis of the economies of Russia and Ukraine (1965–1989) by Treml and Alexeev. To a varying degree, the second economy influenced all Eastern Bloc economies.

Grossman defines the concept of the second economy with a two-prong test, which is the set of economic activities which satisfy at least one of the two conditions: "(a) being directly for private gain (b) being in some significant respect in knowing contravention of existing law."

Studies of second, shadow, grey and other economies are difficult because unlike official economies there are no direct statistics; therefore, indirect methods are required. Treml and Alexeev studied the relationships between per capita legal money income and such income-dependent variables as per capita savings and purchases of various goods and services. The study indicated that the disparity between legal income and legal spending gradually grew during 1965–1989 and by the end of the period the correlation between the two almost disappeared, indicating the rapid growth of the second economy. The proliferation of the second economy was impossible without widespread corruption.

== History ==
A significant impact on the economy of the Soviet Union was the system of blat, a network of favors which allowed people to procure all kinds of goods and services, operating within both official and second Soviet economies and continued to operate in post-Soviet Russia. Since the early days of the Soviet Union, some authors claim that there has been a tradition to exaggerate the blame of the "black market" for consumer goods shortages, thus effectively shifting the blame off state bureaucrats with their inadequate planning.

During the era of perestroika, the 500 Days program of economic transition mentioned the shadow economy would be an important factor in reforms and predicted that at least 90% of it was to be absorbed by the opening free market.

== See also ==
- Corruption in the Soviet Union
- Shortage economy
- Blat (favors)
