= Yuri Churbanov =

Soviet politician, son-in-law of Leonid Brezhnev

- Юрий Чурбанов

First Deputy Minister of Internal Affairs of the Soviet Union
- In office February 1980 – November 1984
- Premier: Alexei Kosygin; Nikolai Tikhonov; Nikolai Ryzhkov
- Preceded by: Viktor Paputin
- Succeeded by: Vasily Trushin

Personal details
- Born: 11 November 1936; Moscow, Russian SFSR, Soviet Union (now Russia)
- Died: 7 October 2013 (aged 76); Moscow, Russia
- Political party: Communist Party of the Soviet Union
- Spouse: Galina Brezhneva (former)

Yuri Mikhailovich Churbanov (Russian: Ю́рий Миха́йлович Чурба́нов; 11 November 1936 – 7 October 2013) was a Soviet politician and the son-in-law of longtime General Secretary Leonid Brezhnev.

== Life and career ==
Churbanov was born on 11 November 1936. As a young boy he was an active member of the Komsomol. He attended the Moscow State University in the 1960s and studied in the Faculty of Law. In 1967 he started working as a police officer, and in 1971 before his marriage to Galina Brezhneva, became a Lieutenant colonel of the Police. His marriage to Galina was arranged by her father, General Secretary Leonid Brezhnev. When marrying Galina Churbanov left his wife and his two children. A friend of Galina has told the Russian media that there was no love between the two, and that they kissed only two times: the first at their wedding and the second when Churbanov was sent to jail. However, Churbanov's marriage to Galina led to him being rapidly promoted. When he married Galina he was working as a police officer, however, four years later he was First Deputy Minister of the Ministry of Internal Affairs and held the military rank of General. Churbanov was arrested on charges of embezzlement and corruption along with Galina's brother, Yuri, for his involvement in the Uzbek cotton scandal. In 1990, when Churbanov was still in jail, Galina filed for a divorce.

Churbanov died on 7 October 2013.
