= Central Committee of the 27th Congress of the Communist Party of the Soviet Union =

Soviet government 1986–1990

The Central Committee of the 27th Congress of the Communist Party of the Soviet Union was in session from 1986 until 1990. Its 1st Plenary Session elected the Politburo, the Secretariat and the Party Control Committee of the 27th Congress of the Communist Party of the Soviet Union.

== History ==
=== Election and composition ===
The 27th Congress witnessed the greatest turnover of Central Committee members in the party's history since 22nd Party Congress (held in 1961) during Nikita Khrushchev's leadership. The numbers of full membership were reduced from 319 in the 26th Central Committee to 307, while candidate membership was increased from 151 to 170. Of the 307 full members elected to the 27th Central Committee, 102 (making up 33 percent of membership) were newcomers. 25 officials, who had previously served as candidate members in the 26th Central Committee, were promoted to full membership. In total 125 new full members were appointed, making up 41 percent. 182 members (59 percent) were reelected to the 27th Central Committee, a decrease from the 26th Congress, in which 238 (75 percent) were reelected. Of the 170 candidate members, 54 (32 percent) were reelected, while the other 116 were newcomers. The 1st Plenary Session elected Lev Zaykov (then First Secretary of the Leningrad City Party Committee) to full membership in the Politburo, while Nikolay Slyunkov (Communist Party of Byelorussia First Secretary) and Yuri Solovyev (First Secretary of the Leningrad Regional Party Committee) were given Politburo candidate membership. The plenum elected five newcomers to the Secretariat; Alexandra Biryukova (the first women to hold high party office since Yekaterina Furtseva in the Khrushchev era), Anatoly Dobrynin, Vadim Medvedev, Georgy Razumovsky and Alexander Yakovlev. The 1st Plenary Session reelected Mikhail Gorbachev to the office of the general secretary.

In a similar vein, Gorbachev managed to get close advisers elected to the Central Committee. Anatoly Chernyaev (Gorbachev's foreign adviser) and Anatoly Lukyanov, (head of the party's General Department) were promoted to full membership, while Valery Boldin was elected to the 27th Central Committee as a candidate member. Several figures within the Central Academy of Social Sciences, most notably Evgeny Velikhov, were appointed to the Central Committee as candidate members. Notably the 27th Congress did not reelect Richard Kosolapov, the longtime editor of the party's theoretical journal Kommunist, and was replaced by Ivan Frolov. Several Brezhnev appointed heads of Central Committee departments failed to be reelected to the Central Committee; Ivan Sakhnyuk (Agricultural-Machine Building Department), Kirill Simonov (Transport and Communications Department) and Vasily Shauro (Culture Department). Nikolay Savkin (Administrative Organs Department) and Vladimir Karlov (Agriculture and Food Industry Department) were the two last remaining Central Committee departments heads appointed by Brezhnev. Of the 23 department heads, fourteen were replaced by the 1st Plenary Session. Four leading officials from the Brezhnev era, who retired from the Politburo and the Secretariat at the 27th Congress, were reelected to the Central Committee; Nikolai Tikhonov (former chairman of the Council of Ministers), Nikolai Baibakov (the former chairman of the State Planning Committee), Boris Ponomarev (former head of the International Department) and Vasili Kuznetsov (the former first deputy chairman of the Presidium of the Supreme Soviet).

=== Tenure ===
==== Combating party formalism; 1st–2nd Plenary Sessions ====
The newly elected leadership was united in supporting reforms, principally behind the slogan uskoreniye (literally "acceleration"), which called for improving the Soviet economy, and to combat formalism, corruption, nepotism and centralism within the party. Beginning in March 1985, the Central Committee (through the Soviet press) began criticizing the norms and organizational habits of the party; criticism increased by the discovery of corruption rings in the communist parties of Kazakhstan (CPK, Kirghizia (CPKi), Turkmenistan (CPT), Moldavia (CPM), Uzbekistan (CPU) and Azerbaijan (ACP). The policy of appointing officials on the basis of "personal loyalty, servility and protectionism" were blamed on the party's subpar performance in certain areas, and in areas in which this was not the case, the Central Committee focused on the lack of inner-party democracy. To strengthen party democracy, Gorbachev called for an increase in criticism and self-criticism (claiming it was as critical "for us as air") to overcome "'paradeness, ballyhoo . . . [and] the embellishment of reality". An article in Pravda noted that "In some places people try to 'prepare' the discussion in such a way as to avoid any tricky issues in it. Speeches are usually made only by 'staff' speakers, usually in a predetermined order. Things even go as far as the editing of draft texts of speeches." Meetings became ceremonial, and lacked effective power—which led local authorities to misinform the central authorities on the situation in the given area. All forms of "window-dressing", or hiding abuses of power in general, were to be stopped. In the current situation, Solovyev noted;

The main demand which the party makes under modern conditions on the party committee secretary and the staff officer is ensuring that nowhere, under no circumstances, does word part from deed since any discrepancy here causes palpable damage to the authority of our policy and cannot be tolerated in any form.

Boris Griaznov, the First Secretary of the Frunze District Party Committee, was signalled out as an official "'accustomed to stagnation, encouraged ostentation, ignored collective opinion, lost the feeling of party comradeship, and only pretended to be carrying out restructuring", while party leaders in Kazakhstan had difficulty of ridding"themselves of elements of excessive administration and a commander-like style [behaviour]". The central leadership continued to highlight the party work ethics of first secretaries at every level; at the 2nd Plenary Session Gorbachev condemned certain localities of not committing themselves to the new work-style. In other cases, as noted by Gorbachev, party leaders did not know how to react to criticism or how to introduce changes, noting that "Sometimes words are substituted for deeds, no action is taken in response to criticism, and self-criticism takes the form of self-flagellation." Historian Graeme Gill asserts;

"complaints about the way in which the party was operating which resounded through the press in 1985 and 1986 amounted to a condemnation of the party's organisational culture. [...] During the first eighteen months or so of Gorbachev's tenure as General Secretary, there seems to have been a general underestimation of the strength and sources of this culture and of what was necessary to eradicate it. The heart of the solution the Gorbachev leadership pursued was thoroughly traditional in the Soviet context, personnel.

Collectivity of leadership, and collectivism in general, was hailed as "a reliable guarantee against the adoption of volitional, subjective decisions, manifestations of the cult of personality, and the infringement of Leninist norms of party life." In tandem, the Central Committee began calling for psychological restructuring of party members. However, since the 27th Congress failed to create institutions which oversaw the implementation of these measures (and others), individual members who had no interest in changing their work habits were not punished. The reason for the lack of oversight was Gorbachev's belief that the party was a "healthy organism", and as Graeme Gill concludes, "A healthy organism clearly did not need radical institutional surgery." When it became clear to Gorbachev that the reforms to "invigorate" the party had failed, the reform consensus within the leadership was split asunder. Gorbachev began moving in a more radical directions, while several prominent colleagues in the Politburo, Secretariat and the Central Committee opposed his new measures. The schism in the leadership led to the failure to convene the 3rd Plenary Session in the last half of 1986 (being postponed to January 1987). Nonetheless, before the 3rd Plenary Session, the Central Committee was able to remove Dinmukhamed Konayev, the CPK First Secretary. The removal of Konayev, who was widely perceived to support an out-dated work ethic and to be corrupt, led to the Jeltoqsan riots when it was discovered that Konayev would be replaced by Gennady Kolbin, an ethnic Russian who had never lived in the Kazakh Soviet Socialist Republic.

==== Democratization: 3rd–7th Plenary Sessions ====
On 23 December 1985, the Politburo appointed Boris Yeltsin, an official from Sverdlovsk, First Secretary of the Moscow City Committee (de facto mayor of Moscow). Gorbachev had endorsed the appointment, heeding the advice of Yegor Ligachev (the party's informal second-in-command) who personally recommended him. In contrast, Nikolai Ryzhkov told Gorbachev in private that "He [Yeltsin] will cause you only grief. I would not recommend him." Yeltsin, who had introduced himself as something of a centrist at the 27th Congress, proved himself to be a supporter of radical change, going even as far, as on 19 January 1986, of criticising Gorbachev personally for "exaggerat[ing] the changes that had occurred" during his leadership.

Gorbachev opened the 3rd Plenary Session by criticising the party's performance, claiming the party's failure to reform was due to "conservatism and inertia, lenience and lack of demandingness, toadyism and personal adulation, red tape, formalism, intolerance and suppression of criticism, ambition and careerism, administration by decree, permissiveness, mutual coverups, careerism, departmentalism, parochialism, nationalism, substitutionism, a weakening of the role of party meetings and elective bodies, embezzlement, bribery, report-padding and violation of discipline." The cure for this "disease" was "demokratizatsiya", literally the democratization of society. He called for open, democratic debates in the primary party organizations and to allow a secret ballot during plenary sessions of the district, area, city, region and territory party committees and the central committees of the republican parties to elect the executive organs. This was an attack on the nomenklatura, a system in which leading officials appointed the cadres at the level below, the basis of the Soviet system. The plenary session opposed his suggestions, and while his criticisms were mentioned in the Resolution of the 3rd Plenary Session, the idea of multi-candidate elections within the Party were omitted from the text.

In preparation of the 4th Plenary Session, Gorbachev had prepared a speech on Soviet and Party history. In it he condemned the rule of Joseph Stalin and Stalinism in general, but the speech was amended by Politburo. Conservatives such as Ligachev, Andrei Gromyko, Mikhail Solomentsev and Vitaly Vorotnikov did not share Gorbachev's views, or at least, did not support a public anti-Stalinist proclamation. Despite the conservative reaction, Gorbachev was able to rehabilitate Nikolay Bukharin and Nikita Khrushchev, while referring to Stalin's repressive regime as "immense and unpardonable".

"People have often asked me—and later I asked myself the same question—why didn't Gorbachev decide to get me out of the way once and for all [in 1987]. . . . I could easily have been pensioned off or sent as ambassador to some faraway country. Yet Gorbachev let me stay in Moscow, gave me a relatively high placed job, and, in effect, kept a determined opponent close by him. It is my belief that if Gorbachev didn't have a Yeltsin, he would have had to invent one.... In this real-life production, the parts have been appropriately cast, as in a well-directed play. There is the conservative Ligachev, who plays the villain; there is Yeltsin, the bully-boy, the madcap radical; and the wise omniscient hero is Gorbachev himself. That, evidently, is how he sees it."

— Boris Yeltsin on his appointment as First Deputy Chairman of the State Committee for Construction.

The 4th Plenary Session was supposed to discuss economic reforms, but instead of focusing on the matter at hand Yeltsin, according to Gorbachev, attacked the speed of perestroika, the work of the Secretariat and Ligachev personally. From this point on, the relationship between Gorbachev and Yeltsin would only grow worse—however, by this time, the press mistakenly had begun to present Yeltsin as Gorbachev's closest reformist associate in the Politburo. In the summer of 1987, when Gorbachev was on vacation, Ligachev (on Gorbachev's bidding) led the party apparatus (and chaired the meetings of the Politburo). On 10 September he organized an Inquiry Commission of the Central Committee to investigate the performance of the Moscow City Committee under Yeltsin's stewardship—Yeltsin reacted to the inquiry by becoming the first Politburo member in history to willingly resign from his seat. In response Gorbachev told Yeltsin they could discuss the situation after the 70th Anniversary of the October Revolution. At the 5th Plenary Session, which was devoted to the aforementioned anniversary, Yeltsin completely broke by protocol by denouncing Gorbachev and Ligachev personally, and resigned from the Politburo. The central leadership reacted in kind, by criticizing him at the plenary session; Yakovlev contended that he had been "reacting immaturely to 'petty offenses'", while Ryzhkov accused him of being driven by "ambition pure and simple". Soon after his resignation, Yeltsin was hospitalized, either for suffering a heart attack (as Yeltsin contends) or for "a fake suicide attempt with scissors" (as Gorbachev and the members of the central leadership contends). At a session of the Moscow City Committee on 11 November 1987, the party leadership dragged Yeltsin out of the hospital and forced him to attend the meeting in which he was relieved of his duties as First Secretary and unceremoniously humiliated. The meeting proved to be a mistake; the Soviet populace began sympathising with Yeltsin—a problem which was compounded "by the mistake" of Gorbachev attending the Moscow City Committee session. In the aftermath, Yeltsin was appointed First Deputy Chairman of the State Committee for Construction (chaired by Yuri Batalin), but was told on the day of his appointment by Gorbachev that he could not participate in politics.

At the 6th Plenary Session Ligachev delivered the first speech, the first time that Gorbachev had not done so himself. Ligachev attacked what he perceived as the excesses of glasnost, the influence of rock music in society, "the blackening of Soviet history" and the failure of the leadership to do anything with the growing nationalism in the republics. Gorbachev did not speak until the second day of the plenum, and gave a defensive speech in which he defended his reform efforts but called for the establishment of a "middle ground" in which balanced Soviet historiography and supported using Soviet patriotism to counter the rising nationalism in the republics. The plenary session relieved Yeltsin of his duties as candidate member of the Politburo and member of the Secretariat, and elected Razumovsky (Head of the Organisational-Party Work Department) and Yuri Maslyukov (Chairman of the State Planning Committee) to Politburo candidate membership. Leading conservative figures, such as General Dmitry Yazov, had begun criticising Gorbachev's democratising policies openly in December 1987, claiming they weakened the honour of the Soviet military, while party first secretaries in the republics called for a tightening of party control in reaction to the growing nationalism amongst the populace.

In between the 6th and the 7th plenary sessions, the Nina Andreyeva Affair took place. Andreyeva, "an hitherto unknown lecturer at a Leningrad chemical institute, wrote an article in Sovetskaya Rossiya titled "I Cannot Forsake My Principles". She condemned Gorbachev's reforms and called for their reversal. She criticized the Gorbachev leadership's habit of opening the previous black spots in Soviet history, which she claimed only helped to denigrate the Soviet past. In addition, the article is notable for its antisemitism; of all the Jews mentioned, only Karl Marx was not accused of participating in blackening of Soviet history and destroying the Soviet order. The importance of the article does not lay in its author, but rather how it was interpreted by the forces in the Central Committee — both conservatives, centrists and reformers fought Nina Andreyeva was a pseudonym used by a high-standing official. It was consistently referred to posthumously as "an anti-perestroika manifesto". The publication of the article had been chosen carefully by conservative forces within the Central Committee apparatus and Valentin Chikin, the editor-in-chief of Sovetskaya Rossiya, and it was published on 13 March to coincide with Gorbachev's visit to Yugoslavia and Yavkovlev's visit to Mongolia on 14 March. With both of the leading reformers gone, the conservative Ligachev was in charge of the Central Committee apparatus. Ligachev endorsed the article, stating it was "a benchmark for what we need in our ideology today." In the words of historian Archie Brown "Old habits of prudence rapidly reasserted themselves in the face of an apparent signal of change in the balance of forces at the top of the party hierarchy and of a return to a time when dissenting intellectuals would no longer be treated with tolerance." Upon his return on 18 March, Gorbachev discussed it with the Politburo. To his surprise several of his colleagues supported the content of the article, among them Vorotnikov, Gromyko, Ligachev, Solomentsev and Viktor Nikonov. The article was discussed in the 24–26 March Politburo meeting, in which the aforementioned conservatives alongside Viktor Chebrikov, the chairman of the KGB, and Anatoly Lukyanov, a close associate of Gorbachev and the Head of the General Department, supported the article. Chebrikov condemned the criticisms of the Soviet system which had appeared with Gorbachev's reforms, and lamented the scheming "of our ideological adversary". Despite forming a majority, the conservatives did not opt for removing Gorbachev, largely because the institution of General Secretary still meant something in Soviet politics. Gorbachev insisted that every Politburo member had to openly state their position on the matter; Yakovlev, Ryzhkov, Medvedev and Eduard Shevardnadze condemned the article. In light of the pro-reformist stance of this mentioned, and Gorbachev himself, they managed to push the conservatives on the defensive, and got their approval to publish a formal reply to the article.

In light of this event, Gorbachev would seek to consolidate his power within the apparatus even further, especially in the Secretariat (which oversaw the work of the Central Committee apparatus). In his first years as General Secretary, Gorbachev had never chaired a meeting of the Secretariat, leaving that responsibility to the conservative. But in light of the strong backing the Andreyeva article had in the Central Committee apparatus, Gorbachev chaired the first Secretariat meetings in the affair's aftermath.

== Plenums ==
The Central Committee was not a permanent institution. It convened plenary sessions. 21 CC plenary sessions were held between the 27th Congress and the 28th Congress. When the CC was not in session, decision-making power was vested in the internal bodies of the CC itself; that is, the Politburo and the Secretariat. None of these bodies were permanent either; typically they convened several times a month.

Plenary sessions of the Central Committee
Plenum	Date	Length
1st Plenary Session	6 March 1986	1 day
2nd Plenary Session	16 June 1986	1 day
3rd Plenary Session	27–28 January 1987	2 days
4th Plenary Session	25–26 June 1987	2 days
5th Plenary Session	21 October 1987	1 day
6th Plenary Session	17–18 February 1988	2 days
7th Plenary Session	23 May 1988	1 day
8th Plenary Session	29 July 1988	1 day
9th Plenary Session	30 September 1988	1 day
10th Plenary Session	28 November 1988	1 day
11th Plenary Session	10 January 1989	1 day
12th Plenary Session	15–16 March 1989	2 days
13th Plenary Session	25 April 1989	1 day
14th Plenary Session	22 May 1989	1 day
15th Plenary Session	2 June 1989	1 day
16th Plenary Session	19–20 September 1989	2 days
17th Plenary Session	9 December 1989	1 day
18th Plenary Session	25–26 December 1989	2 days
19th Plenary Session	5–7 February 1990	3 days
20th Plenary Session	11, 14, 16 March 1990	3 days
21st Plenary Session	29 June 1990	1 day

== Apparatus ==
Individuals employed by Central Committee's bureaus, departments and newspapers made up the apparatus between the 27th Congress and the 28th Congress. The bureaus and departments were supervised by the Secretariat, and each secretary (member of the Secretariat) supervised a specific department. The leaders of departments were officially referred to as Heads, while the titles of bureau leaders varied between chairman, first secretary and secretary.

=== Traditional structure (1986–88) ===
Central Committee Apparatus of the 27th Congress of the Communist Party of the Soviet Union established by the 1st Plenary Session
Institution	Leader	Cyrillic	Took office	Left office	Length of tenure
Administrator of Affairs	Nikolay Kruchina	Николай Кручина	6 March 1986	24 August 1988	2 years and 171 days
Administrative Organs Department	Nikolai Savinkin	Николай Савинкин	6 March 1986	17 January 1987	317 days
Administrative Organs Department	Anatoly Lukyanov	Анатолий Лукьянов	17 January 1987	30 September 1988	1 year and 257 days
Agriculture and Food Industry Department	Vladimir Karlov	Влади́мир Ка́рлов	6 March 1986	October 1986	209 days
Cadres Abroad Department	Stepan Chervonenko	Степан Червоненко	6 March 1986	30 September 1988	2 years and 208 days
Chemical Industry Department	Veniamin Afonin	Вениамин Афонин	6 March 1986	30 September 1988	2 years and 208 days
Construction Department	Alexander Melnikov	Александр Мельников	6 March 1986	30 September 1988	2 years and 208 days
Culture Department	Yuri Voronov	Юрий Во́ронов	6 March 1986	30 September 1988	2 years and 208 days
Defence Industry Department	Oleg Belyakov	Олег Беляков	6 March 1986	30 September 1988	2 years and 208 days
Economic Department	Vacant	—	6 March 1986	17 January 1987	317 days
Economic Department	Nikolay Slyunkov	Никола́й Слюнько́в	17 January 1987	30 September 1988	1 year and 257 days
General Department	Anatoly Lukyanov	Анатолий Лукьянов	6 March 1986	17 January 1987	317 days
General Department	Valery Boldin	Валерий Болдин	17 January 1987	30 September 1988	1 year and 257 days
Heavy Industry and Energy Department	Ivan Yastrebov	Иван Ястребов	6 March 1986	30 September 1988	2 years and 208 days
Institute of Marxism–Leninism	Anatoly Yegorov	Анато́лий Его́ров	6 March 1986	17 January 1987	317 days
Institute of Marxism–Leninism	Georgy Smirnov	Анато́лий Его́ров	17 January 1987	30 September 1988	1 year and 257 days
International Department	Anatoly Dobrynin	Анато́лий Добры́нин	6 March 1986	30 September 1988	2 years and 208 days
Kommunist	Ivan Frolov	Иван Фролов	6 March 1986	17 January 1987	317 days
Kommunist	Nail Bikkenin	Иван Фролов	17 January 1987	30 September 1988	1 year and 257 days
Light Industry and Consumer Goods Department	Leonid Bobykin	Леонид Бобыкин	6 March 1986	30 September 1988	2 years and 208 days
Machine-Building Department	Arkady Volsky	Арка́дий Во́льский	6 March 1986	30 September 1988	2 years and 208 days
Organizational-Party Work Department	Georgy Razumovsky	Гео́ргий Разумо́вский	6 March 1986	30 September 1988	2 years and 208 days
Propaganda Department	Yuri Sklyarov	Юрий Скляров	6 March 1986	30 September 1988	2 years and 208 days
Pravda	Viktor Afanasyev	Ви́ктор Афана́сьев	6 March 1986	30 September 1988	2 years and 208 days
Relations with Communist and Workers Parties Department	Vadim Medvedev	Вадим Медведев	6 March 1986	30 September 1988	2 years and 208 days
Science and Education Department	Valentin Grigoriev	Юрий Скляров	6 March 1986	30 September 1988	2 years and 208 days
Trade and Domestic Services Department	Nikolai Stashenkov	Николай Сташенков	6 March 1986	30 September 1988	2 years and 208 days
Transport and Communications Department	Viktor Pasternak	Виктор Пастернак	6 March 1986	30 September 1988	2 years and 208 days

=== Reorganisation (1988–90) ===
Central Committee Apparatus of the 27th Congress of the Communist Party of the Soviet Union established by the 9th Plenary Session
Institution	Leader	Cyrillic	Took office	Left office	Length of tenure
Administrator of Affairs	Nikolay Kruchina	Николай Кручина	30 September 1988	13 July 1990	1 year and 286 days
Agricultural Department	Ivan Skiba	Иван Скиба	30 September 1988	13 July 1990	1 year and 286 days
Commission on Agrarian Policy	Yegor Ligachyov	Егор Лигачёв	30 September 1988	13 July 1990	1 year and 286 days
Commission on International Policy	Alexander Yakovlev	Алекса́ндр Я́ковлев	30 September 1988	13 July 1990	1 year and 286 days
Commission on Legal Policy	Viktor Chebrikov	Виктор Че́бриков	30 September 1988	20 September 1989	355 days
Commission on Legal Policy	Vacant	—	20 September 1989	13 July 1990	296 days
Commission on Party Building and Cadre Work Commission Policy	Georgy Razumovsky	Гео́ргий Разумо́вский	30 September 1988	13 July 1990	1 year and 286 days
Commission on Socio-Economic Policy	Nikolay Slyunkov	Никола́й Слюнько́в	30 September 1988	13 July 1990	1 year and 286 days
Defence Department	Oleg Belyakov	Олег Беляков	30 September 1988	13 July 1990	1 year and 286 days
General Department	Valery Boldin	Валерий Болдин	30 September 1988	13 July 1990	1 year and 286 days
Ideology Commission	Vadim Medvedev	Вадим Медведев	30 September 1988	13 July 1990	1 year and 286 days
Ideology Department	Aleksandr Kapto	Александр Капто	30 September 1988	13 July 1990	1 year and 286 days
Institute of Marxism–Leninism	Georgy Smirnov	Анато́лий Его́ров	30 September 1988	13 July 1990	1 year and 286 days
International Department	Valentin Falin	Baлeнтин Фaлин	30 September 1988	13 July 1990	1 year and 286 days
Kommunist	Nail Bikkenin	Иван Фролов	30 September 1988	13 July 1990	1 year and 286 days
Party Building and Cadre Work Department	Valery Sharkov	Валерий Шарков	30 September 1988	13 July 1990	1 year and 286 days
Pravda	Viktor Afanasyev	Ви́ктор Афана́сьев	30 September 1988	1989	93 days
Pravda	Ivan Frolov	Иван Фролов	1989	13 July 1990	1 year and 193 days
Socio-Economic Department	Vladislav Shimko	Владимир Шимко	30 September 1988	13 July 1990	1 year and 286 days
State Legal Policy Department	Alexander Pavlov	Александр Павлов	30 September 1988	13 July 1990	1 year and 286 days

== Composition ==
=== Members ===
Members of the Central Committee of the 27th Congress of the Communist Party of the Soviet Union
Name	Cyrillic	26th CC	28th CC	Birth	Death	PM	Ethnicity	Gender
Sergey Afanasyev	Серге́й Афана́сьев	Old	Resigned	1918	2001	1943	Russian	Male
Viktor Afanasyev	Ви́ктор Афана́сьев	Old	Not	1922	1994	1943	Russian	Male
Veniamin Afonin	Серге́й Афана́сьев	Promoted	Reelected	1931	2017	1957	Russian	Male
Sergey Akhromeyev	Серге́й Ахроме́ев	Old	Not	1923	1991	1943	Russian	Male
Aleksandr Aksyonov	Алекса́ндр Аксёнов	Old	Not	1924	2009	1945	Belarusian	Male
Anatoly Alexandrov	Анатолий Александров	Old	Resigned	1903	1994	1962	Ukrainian	Male
Heydar Aliyev	Гейда́р Али́ев	Old	Resigned	1923	2003	1945	Azerbaijani	Male
Alexander Altunin	Алекса́ндр Алту́нин	Old	Resigned	1921	1989	1943	Russian	Male
Vladimir Anichtchev	Владимир Анищев	New	Not	1935	2018	1961	Russian	Male
Aleksey Antonov	Алексей Антонов	Old	Resigned	1912	2010	1940	Russian	Male
Georgy Arbatov	Гео́ргий Арба́тов	Old	Not	1923	2010	1943	Russian	Male
Boris Aristov	Борис Аристов	Old	Not	1925	2018	1945	Russian	Male
Ivan Arkhipov	Иван Архипов	Old	Resigned	1907	1998	1928	Russian	Male
Vladimir Arkhipov	Владимир Архи́пов	New	Not	1933	2004	1957	Russian	Male
Erkin Auelbekov	Еркин Ауельбеков	Old	Not	1930	1999	1940	Kazakh	Male
Alexander Babenko	Александр Бабенко	Promoted	Not	1935	Alive	1961	Russian	Male
Kamran Baghirov	Кямран Багиров	New	Resigned	1933	2000	1961	Azerbaijani	Male
Nikolai Baibakov	Николай Байбаков	Old	Resigned	1911	2008	1939	Russian	Male
Vadim Bakatin	Вадим Бакатин	New	Reelected	1937	2022	1964	Russian	Male
Vyacheslav Bakhirev	Вячеслав Бахирев	Old	Resigned	1916	1991	1951	Russian	Male
Boris Bakin	Борис Бакин	Old	Not	1913	1992	1941	Russian	Male
Oleg Baklanov	Оле́г Бакла́нов	New	Reelected	1932	2021	1953	Ukrainian	Male
Anatoly Balandin	Анато́лий Бала́ндин	Old	Not	1927	2014	1954	Russian	Male
Yuri Balandin	Юрий Баландин	Old	Not	1925	2004	1944	Russian	Male
Boris Balmont	Борис Бальмонт	Old	Resigned	1927	2022	1956	Russian	Male
Gennady Bartoshevich	Геннадий Бартошевич	New	Not	1934	1993	1957	Belarusian	Male
Sergei Bashilov	Сергей Башилов	Candidate	Resigned	1923	2005	1947	Russian	Male
Gennady Bashtanyuk	Генна́дий Баштаню́к	Candidate	Not	1949	Alive	1977	Russian	Male
Yuri Batalin	Ю́рий Бата́лин	New	Not	1927	2013	1956	Russian	Male
Vladimir Bazovsky	Владимир Базовский	Old	Not	1917	1993	1942	Russian	Male
Igor Belousov	Игорь Белоусов	New	Not	1928	2005	1955	Russian	Male
Oleg Belyakov	Олег Беляков	New	Not	1933	2003	1961	Russian	Male
Anatoly Beryozin	Анатолий Берёзин	New	Not	1931	1998	1954	Russian	Male
Aleksandra Biryukova	Александра Бирюкова	Old	Not	1929	2008	1956	Russian	Female
Filipp Bobkov	Фили́пп Бобко́в	New	Not	1925	2019	1944	Russian	Male
Gennady Bogomyakov	Генна́дий Богомя́ков	Old	Not	1930	2020	1959	Russian	Male
Valery Boldin	Валерий Болдин	Promoted	Reelected	1935	2006	1960	Russian	Male
Ivan Boldyryov	Иван Болдырёв	New	Not	1937	Alive	1956	Russian	Male
Vasily Borisenkov	Василий Борисенков	Old	Not	1927	2005	1946	Russian	Male
Leonid Borodin	Леонид Бородин	Old	Resigned	1923	2008	1948	Russian	Male
Viktor Boyko	Виктор Бойко	New	Not	1931	2014	1954	Ukrainian	Male
Vladimir Brovikov	Владимир Бровиков	Old	Not	1931	1992	1958	Belarusian	Male
Lidziya Bryzha	Лидия Брызга	Promoted	Not	1943	2014	1975	Belarusian	Female
Boris Bugayev	Борис Бугаев	Old	Not	1923	2007	1942	Ukrainian	Male
Aleksandr Chakovsky	Александр Чаковский	Candidate	Not	1913	1994	1941	Russian	Male
Yevgeniy Chazov	Евгений Чазов	Old	Not	1929	2021	1962	Russian	Male
Viktor Chebrikov	Виктор Че́бриков	Old	Not	1923	1999	1950	Ukrainian	Male
Vasily Cherdintsev	Василий Чердинцев	Old	Not	1927	2018	1956	Russian	Male
Valentina Cherkashina	Валентина Черкашина	New	Not	1942	2012	1972	Russian	Female
Vladimir Chernavin	Владимир Чернавин	Candidate	Not	1928	2023	1949	Russian	Male
Viktor Chernomyrdin	Ви́ктор Черномы́рдин	New	Not	1938	2010	1961	Russian	Male
Anatoly Chernyaev	Василий Шауро	Candidate	Not	1921	2017	1940	Russian	Male
Stepan Chervonenko	Степан Червоненко	Old	Resigned	1915	2003	1940	Ukrainian	Male
Vladimir Chicherov	Влади́мир Чи́черов	Old	Not	1933	1996	1964	Russian	Male
Vladimir Chirskov	Владимир Чирсков	New	Not	1935	Alive	1958	Russian	Male
Aleksey Chornyy	Алексей Чёрный	Old	Resigned	1921	2002	1931	Ukrainian	Male
Pyotr Demichev	Пётр Де́мичев	Old	Resigned	1917	2010	1939	Russian	Male
Vasily Demidenko	Василий Демиденко	Old	Resigned	1930	1998	1955	Ukrainian	Male
Karen Demirchyan	Каре́н Демирчя́н	Old	Resigned	1932	1999	1955	Armenian	Male
Vasily Dinkov	Василий Динков	New	Not	1924	2001	1946	Ukrainian	Male
Viktor Dobrik	Виктор До́брик	Old	Resigned	1927	2008	1954	Ukrainian	Male
Anatoly Dobrynin	Анато́лий Добры́нин	Old	Not	1919	2010	1945	Russian	Male
Vladimir Dolgikh	Владимир Долгих	Old	Resigned	1924	2020	1942	Russian	Male
Valentin Falin	Baлeнтин Фaлин	Promoted	Reelected	1926	2018	1953	Russian	Male
Pavel Fedirko	Па́вел Феди́рко	Old	Not	1932	2019	1957	Russian	Male
Pyotr Fedoseyev	Петр Федосеев	Old	Resigned	1908	1990	1939	Russian	Male
Aleksandr Filatov	Александр Филатов	Old	Resigned	1922	2016	1947	Russian	Male
Pavel Finogenov	Па́вел Финоге́нов	Old	Not	1919	2004	1943	Russian	Male
Vladimir Foteyev	Владимир Фотеев	New	Not	1935	Alive	1961	Russian	Male
Ivan Frolov	Иван Фролов	New	Reelected	1929	1999	1960	Russian	Male
Konstantin Frolov	Константин Фролов	Promoted	Not	1932	2007	1965	Russian	Male
Dmitry Gagarov	Дмитрий Гагаров	New	Died	1938	1989	1966	Russian	Male
Andrey Girenko	Андрей Гиренко	Promoted	Reelected	1936	2017	1963	Ukrainian	Male
Natalya Gellert	Наталья Геллерт	Promoted	Not	1953	Alive	1973	Russian	Female
Ivan Gerasymov	Иван Герасимов	Candidate	Resigned	1921	2008	1942	Ukrainian	Male
Valentin Glushko	Валенти́н Глушко́	Old	Died	1908	1989	1956	Ukrainian	Male
Mariya Golubeva	Мария Голубева	Candidate	Not	1945	1991	1968	Russian	Female
Valentina Golubeva	Валентина Голубева	Old	Not	1949	Alive	1977	Russian	Female
Boris Goncharenko	Николай Голдин	Old	Not	1927	1997	1948	Ukrainian	Male
Mikhail Gorbachev	Михаил Горбачёв	Old	Reelected	1931	2022	1952	Russian	Male
Leonid Gorshkov	Леонид Горшков	Old	Not	1930	1994	1952	Russian	Male
Sergey Gorshkov	Серге́й Горшков	Old	Died	1910	1988	1942	Russian	Male
Boris Gostev	Бори́с Го́стев	Old	Not	1927	2015	1954	Russian	Male
Vladimir Govorov	Владимир Говоров	Old	Not	1924	2006	1946	Russian	Male
Leonid Grekov	Леонид Греков	Old	Not	1928	2004	1949	Russian	Male
Anatoly Gribkov	Анато́лий Грибко́в	Old	Resigned	1919	2008	1943	Russian	Male
Vladimir Grigoriev	Николай Грибачёв	Promoted	Reelected	1941	2011	1960	Belarusian	Male
Petras Griškevičius	Пя́трас Гришкя́вичюс	Old	Died	1924	1987	1945	Lithuanian	Male
Pyotr Grishchenko	Пётр Грищенко	New	Not	1931	2021	1956	Russian	Male
Mariya Gromova	Мария Громова	Old	Resigned	1929	2008	1973	Russian	Female
Andrei Gromyko	Андрей Громыко	Old	Resigned	1909	1989	1931	Belarusian	Male
Semion Grossu	Семён Гроссу	Old	Not	1934	Alive	1961	Moldovan	Male
Aleksandr Gudkov	Александр Гудков	Old	Resigned	1930	1992	1958	Russian	Male
Vladimir Gusev	Владимир Гусев	Old	Not	1932	2022	1963	Russian	Male
Ivan Gustov	Иван Густов	Old	Not	1911	1996	1932	Russian	Male
Timofey Guzhenko	Тимофей Гуженко	Old	Resigned	1918	2008	1941	Russian	Male
Vadim Ignatov	Вадим Игнатов	Old	Not	1931	1998	1953	Russian	Male
Vladimir Ivashko	Владимир Ивашко	Promoted	Reelected	1932	1994	1960	Ukrainian	Male
Yevgeny Ivanovsky	Евге́ний Ивано́вский	Old	Resigned	1918	1991	1941	Belarusian	Male
Yevgeny Kachalovsky	Евгений Качаловский	Old	Not	1926	2011	1947	Ukrainian	Male
Dmitry Kachin	Дмитрий Качин	Old	Not	1929	2025	1953	Russian	Male
Boris Kachura	Борис Качура	Old	Not	1930	2007	1957	Ukrainian	Male
Vladimir Kalashnikov	Владимир Калашников	New	Reelected	1929	2008	1954	Russian	Male
Vladimir Kamentsev	Ка́менцев Миха́йлович	Candidate	Not	1928	2003	1954	Russian	Male
Aleksandr Kapto	Александр Капто	Candidate	Not	1933	2020	1955	Ukrainian	Male
Vladimir Karlov	Влади́мир Ка́рлов	Old	Resigned	1914	1994	1940	Russian	Male
Vladimir Karpov	Владимир Карпов	Promoted	Reelected	1922	2010	1943	Russian	Male
Yevdokya Karpova	Марина Журавлёва	Old	Resigned	1923	2000	1952	Russian	Female
Valentina Kasimova	Валентина Касимова	Promoted	Not	1944	Alive	1972	Russian	Female
Konstantin Katushev	Константин Катушев	Old	Not	1927	2010	1952	Russian	Male
Vasily Kavun	Василий Кавун	Old	Not	1928	2009	1954	Ukrainian	Male
Leonid Kazakov	Леонид Казаков	Old	Not	1951	Alive	1974	Russian	Male
Vladimir Khodyryov	Владимир Ходырёв	New	Not	1930	Alive	1954	Russian	Male
Aleksandr Khomyakov	Александр Хомяков	Old	Not	1932	2014	1958	Russian	Male
Yuri Khristoradnov	Юрий Христораднов	Old	Not	1929	2018	1951	Russian	Male
Tukhtakhon Kirgizbayeva	Тухтахон Киргизбаева	Promoted	Not	1942	Alive	1965	Uzbek	Female
Mikhail Klepikov	Михаил Клепиков	Old	Not	1927	1999	1956	Russian	Male
Stepan Kleyko	Степан Клейко	Promoted	Not	1935	Alive	1966	Russian	Male
Ivan Klimenko	Иван Клименко	Old	Resigned	1921	2006	1945	Russian	Male
Vladimir Klyuyev	Владимир Клюев	Old	Resigned	1924	1998	1949	Ukrainian	Male
Mikhail Knyazyuk	Михаил Князюк	New	Not	1940	Alive	1963	Belarusian	Male
Vyacheslav Kochemasov	Вячеслав Кочемасов	Old	Not	1918	1998	1944	Russian	Male
Alexey Kolbeshkin	Алексей Колбешкин	Promoted	Not	1945	Alive	1976	Russian	Male
Gennady Kolbin	Геннадий Колбин	Old	Not	1927	1998	1954	Russian	Male
Alexander Koldunov	Александр Колдунов	Old	Not	1923	1992	1944	Russian	Male
Aleksandr Kolesnikov	Александр Колесников	Old	Not	1930	2008	1966	Ukrainian	Male
Vladislav Kolesnikov	Владислав Колесников	New	Not	1925	2015	1961	Russian	Male
Serafim Kolpakov	Серафим Колпаков	New	Reelected	1933	2011	1956	Russian	Male
Nikolay Konaryov	Николай Конарёв	New	Not	1927	2007	1952	Ukrainian	Male
Boris Konoplyov	Борис Коноплёв	New	Resigned	1919	2008	1945	Russian	Male
Valentin Koptyug	Коптюг Афанасьевич	Promoted	Reelected	1931	1997	1961	Russian	Male
Georgy Korniyenko	Гео́ргий Корние́нко	Old	Resigned	1925	2006	1947	Ukrainian	Male
Anatoly Korolyov	Анатолий Королёв	Old	Not	1936	Alive	1967	Russian	Male
Vitaly Kostin	Виталий Костин	Old	Not	1938	2009	1961	Russian	Male
Mikhail Kovalyov	Михаил Ковалёв	New	Not	1925	2007	1962	Belarusian	Male
Nikolay Kruchina	Николай Кручина	Old	Reelected	1928	1991	1949	Russian	Male
Zinaida Kruglova	Зинаи́да Кругло́ва	Old	Resigned	1923	1995	1944	Russian	Male
Vladimir Kryuchkov	Влади́мир Крючко́в	New	Reelected	1924	2007	1944	Russian	Male
Yuly Kvitsinsky	Юлий Квицинский	Promoted	Not	1936	2010	1952	Russian	Male
Dinmukhamed Kunaev	Дінмұхаммед Қонаев	Old	Removed	1912	1993	1939	Kazakh	Male
Fyodor Kulikov	Фёдор Куликов	Old	Not	1925	2015	1949	Russian	Male
Viktor Kulikov	Виктор Куликов	Old	Resigned	1921	2013	1942	Russian	Male
Valentin Kuptsov	Валентин Купцов	New	Reelected	1937	Alive	1944	Russian	Male
Semyon Kurkotkin	Семё́н Курко́ткин	Old	Resigned	1917	1990	1940	Russian	Male
Vasily Kuznetsov	Василий Кузнецов	Old	Resigned	1901	1990	1927	Russian	Male
Nikolay Lemayev	Николай Лемаев	New	Not	1929	2000	1955	Russian	Male
Oleksandr Liashko	Алекса́ндр Ляшко́	Old	Resigned	1915	2002	1942	Ukrainian	Male
Yegor Ligachyov	Егор Лигачёв	Old	Not	1920	2021	1944	Russian	Male
Yury Litvintsev	Юрий Литвинцев	New	Reelected	1934	2009	1956	Russian	Male
Alexey Lizichev	Алексей Лизичев	New	Not	1928	2006	1955	Russian	Male
Yuri Lobov	Юрий Лобов	Promoted	Not	1942	Alive	1975	Russian	Male
Anatoly Logunov	Анатолий Логунов	Candidate	Not	1926	2015	1960	Russian	Male
Viktor Lomakin	Виктор Ломакин	Old	Not	1926	2012	1953	Russian	Male
Pyotr Lomako	Пётр Лома́ко	Old	Resigned	1904	1990	1925	Russian	Male
Vladimir Lomonosov	Владимир Ломоносов	Old	Not	1928	1999	1950	Russian	Male
Fodor Loshchenkov	Фодор Лощенков	Old	Not	1915	2009	1943	Russian	Male
Pyotr Luchinsky	Пётр Лучинский	Promoted	Reelected	1941	Alive	1964	Moldovan	Male
Anatoly Lukyanov	Анатолий Лукьянов	New	Reelected	1930	2019	1953	Russian	Male
Anatoly Lushchikov	Анатолий Лущиков	New	Not	1917	1999	1942	Russian	Male
Pyotr Lushev	Пётр Лу́шев	Old	Not	1923	1997	1951	Russian	Male
Ivan Lutak	Иван Лутак	Comeback	Resigned	1919	2009	1940	Ukrainian	Male
Viktor Makarenko	Виктор Макаренко	Old	Resigned	1931	2007	1960	Ukrainian	Male
Qahhor Mahkamov	Кахар Махкамов	New	Reelected	1932	2016	1957	Tajik	Male
Yuri Maksimov	Юрий Максимов	Candidate	Not	1924	2002	1943	Ukrainian	Male
Nikolai Malkov	Николай Мальков	Candidate	Not	1932	2007	1954	Russian	Male
Anatoly Malofeyev	Анато́лий Малофе́ев	New	Reelected	1933	2022	1957	Belarusian	Male
Viktor Maltsev	Виктор Мальцев	Old	Resigned	1917	2003	1945	Russian	Male
Vasily Malykhin	Василий Малыхин	New	Not	1935	Alive	1958	Russian	Male
Yuri Manayenkov	Юрий Манаенков	New	Reelected	1936	2021	1960	Russian	Male
Sergey Manyakin	Сергей Манякин	Old	Not	1923	2010	1945	Russian	Male
Gury Marchuk	Гурий Марчук	Old	Reelected	1925	2013	1947	Russian	Male
Georgy Markov	Гео́ргий Ма́рков	Old	Not	1911	1991	1946	Russian	Male
Absamat Masaliyev	Абсамат Масалиев	New	Reelected	1933	2004	1960	Kyrgyz	Male
Nikolay Maslennikov	Николай Масленников	Old	Not	1921	2013	1951	Russian	Male
Yuri Maslyukov	Юрий Маслюков	New	Reelected	1937	2010	1966	Russian	Male
Vitaliy Masol	Виталий Масол	Promoted	Reelected	1928	2018	1956	Ukrainian	Male
Anatoly Mayorets	Анатолий Майорец	Candidate	Not	1929	2016	1957	Russian	Male
Vadim Medvedev	Вадим Медведев	New	Not	1929	2025	1952	Russian	Male
Alexander Melnikov	Александр Мельников	New	Not	1930	2011	1957	Russian	Male
Marat Mendybayev	Марат Мендыбаев	New	Not	1936	2011	1958	Kazakh	Male
Galina Merkulova	Галина Меркулова	Promoted	Not	1951	Alive	1976	Uzbek	Female
Valentin Mesyats	Валентин Месяц	Old	Not	1928	2019	1955	Russian	Male
Guram Metonidze	Гурам Метонидзе	Promoted	Not	1935	Alive	1964	Georgian	Male
Viktor Mironenko	Виктор Мироненко	Promoted	Not	1953	Alive	1975	Ukrainian	Male
Vasily Mironov	Василий Миронов	New	Died	1925	1988	1949	Ukrainian	Male
Oleg Miroshikhin	Олег Мирошихин	New	Not	1928	Alive	1959	Russian	Male
Viktor Mishin	Виктор Мишин	New	Not	1943	Alive	1967	Russian	Male
Fedir Morhun	Фёдор Моргу́н	Old	Not	1924	2008	1952	Ukrainian	Male
Ivan Morozov	Иван Морозов	Old	Died	1924	1987	1943	Russian	Male
Dmitry Motorny	Дмитрий Моторный	New	Not	1927	2018	1951	Ukrainian	Male
Ivan Mozgovoy	Ива́н Мозгово́й	Old	Resigned	1927	2005	1940	Ukrainian	Male
Vsevolod Murakhovsky	Евгений Муравьёв	Old	Not	1926	2017	1946	Ukrainian	Male
Yevgeny Muravyov	Евгений Муравьёв	Old	Resigned	1929	1998	1952	Russian	Male
Alexey Myasnikov	Алексей Мясников	New	Not	1934	Alive	1974	Russian	Male
Vladislav Mysnichenko	Владислав Мысниченко	Old	Not	1929	2019	1955	Ukrainian	Male
Nursultan Nazarbayev	Нурсултан Назарбаев	New	Reelected	1940	Alive	1962	Kazakh	Male
Mikhail Nenashev	Михаи́л Нена́шев	Promoted	Reelected	1929	2019	1952	Russian	Male
Viktor Nikonov	Виктор Никонов	Old	Not	1929	1993	1954	Russian	Male
Saparmurat Niyazov	Сапармурад Ниязов	New	Reelected	1940	2006	1962	Turkmen	Male
Anatoly Nochyovkin	Анатолий Ночёвкин	New	Resigned	1928	Alive	1956	Russian	Male
Genrikh Novozhilov	Сапармурад Ниязов	New	Reelected	1925	2019	1951	Russian	Male
Vladimir Odintsov	Владимир Одинцов	New	Resigned	1924	2009	1944	Russian	Male
Nikolai Orgakov	Николай Огарков	Old	Resigned	1917	1994	1945	Russian	Male
Vladimir Orlov	Владимир Орлов	Old	Not	1921	1999	1948	Russian	Male
Vladimir Osipov	Владимир Осипов	Promoted	Not	1933	Alive	1958	Russian	Male
Konstantin Panov	Константин Панов	Candidate	Not	1933	2005	1967	Russian	Male
Valentina Parshina	Валентина Паршина	Promoted	Not	1937	2020	1965	Russian	Female
Yemelyan Parubok	Емелья́н Па́рубок	New	Reelected	1940	2017	1966	Ukrainian	Male
Jumber Patiashvili	Джумбер Патиашвили	New	Not	1940	Alive	1962	Georgian	Male
Borys Paton	Бори́с Пато́н	Old	Reelected	1918	2020	1952	Ukrainian	Male
Nikolai Pavlov	Николай Павлов	Promoted	Not	1950	Alive	1978	Russian	Male
Vladimir Pavlov	Влади́мир Па́влов	Old	Not	1923	1998	1948	Russian	Male
Ivan Pentyukhov	Иван Пентюхов	Promoted	Not	1929	1997	1962	Russian	Male
Nina Pereverzeva	Ни́на Переве́рзева	Old	Not	1929	2022	1970	Russian	Female
Erlen Pervyshin	Эрлен Первышин	Candidate	Not	1932	2004	1959	Russian	Male
Vasily Petrov	Васи́лий Петро́в	Old	Not	1917	2014	1944	Russian	Male
Vladislav Petrov	Владислав Петров	Old	Not	1935	2011	1961	Ukrainian	Male
Yuri Petrov	Юрий Петров	New	Not	1939	2013	1962	Russian	Male
Alexander Plekhanov	Александр Плеханов	New	Reelected	1932	2015	1960	Russian	Male
Pyotr Pleshakov	Пётр Плешаков	Old	Died	1922	1987	1944	Russian	Male
Valentina Pletnyova	Валентина Плетнёва	New	Not	1930	2012	1952	Russian	Female
Ivan Polozkov	Иван Полозков	New	Reelected	1935	Alive	1958	Russian	Male
Viktor Polyakov	Ви́ктор Поляко́в	Old	Resigned	1915	2004	1944	Russian	Male
Alexey Ponomarev	Алексей Пономарёв	New	Reelected	1930	2002	1957	Russian	Male
Boris Ponomarev	Борис Пономарёв	Old	Resigned	1905	1995	1919	Russian	Male
Mikhail Ponomarev	Михаил Пономарёв	Old	Resigned	1918	2001	1939	Russian	Male
Filipp Popov	Филипп Попов	New	Not	1930	2007	1957	Russian	Male
Nikolay Popov	Николай Попов	Old	Not	1931	2008	1960	Russian	Male
Yevgeny Primakov	Евгений Примаков	Promoted	Not	1929	2015	1959	Russian	Male
Ilya Prokopyev	Николай Приезжев	Old	Resigned	1926	2017	1946	Chuvash	Male
Yuri Prokopyev	Юрий Прокопьев	New	Not	1932	2017	2003	Russian	Male
Vladimir Ptitsyn	Влади́мир Пти́цын	Old	Resigned	1925	2006	1946	Russian	Male
Nikolay Pugin	Николай Пугин	New	Not	1940	Alive	1965	Russian	Male
Boris Pugo	Борис Пуго	New	Not	1937	1991	1963	Latvian	Male
Oleg Rakhmanin	Олег Рахманин	Old	Resigned	1924	2010	1942	Russian	Male
Yevgeny Razumov	Евгений Разумов	Candidate	Not	1919	2017	1942	Belarusian	Male
Georgy Razumovsky	Гео́ргий Разумо́вский	Candidate	Not	1936	Alive	1961	Russian	Male
Alexander Rekunkov	Александр Рекунков	Old	Resigned	1920	1996	1940	Russian	Male
Anatoly Reut	Анатолий Реут	New	Not	1928	2001	1955	Belarusian	Male
Grigory Revenko	Григорий Ревенко	New	Not	1936	2014	1962	Ukrainian	Male
Ivan Romazan	Иван Ромазан	Promoted	Not	1934	1991	1964	Russian	Male
Yakov Ryabov	Я́ков Ря́бов	Old	Not	1928	2018	1954	Russian	Male
Anatoly Rybakov	Анатолий Рыбаков	Old	Not	1927	2012	1961	Russian	Male
Vasily Rykov	Василий Рыков	Old	Resigned	1918	2011	1943	Russian	Male
Nikolai Ryzhkov	Николай Рыжков	Old	Reelected	1929	2024	1956	Russian	Male
Kakimbek Salykov	Какимбек Салыков	New	Not	1932	2013	1958	Kazakh	Male
Nikolai Savinkin	Николай Савинкин	Old	Resigned	1913	1993	1927	Russian	Male
Valery Saykin	Валерий Сайкин	New	Not	1937	2024	1966	Russian	Male
Anatoly Sazonov	Анатолий Сазонов	New	Not	1935	2019	1962	Ukrainian	Male
Vitaly Shabanov	Вита́лий Шаба́нов	Old	Not	1923	1995	1947	Russian	Male
Midkhat Shakirov	Мидха́т Шаки́ров	Old	Resigned	1916	2004	1944	Bashkir	Male
Stepan Shalayev	Степан Шалаев	Old	Not	1929	2022	1954	Russian	Male
Vasily Shamshin	Василий Шамшин	Candidate	Not	1926	2009	1962	Russian	Male
Leonid Sharin	Леонид Шарин	New	Not	1934	2014	1962	Russian	Male
Mikhail Shchadov	Михаил Щадов	New	Not	1927	2011	1947	Russian	Male
Boris Shcherbina	Борис Щербина	Old	Not	1919	1990	1939	Ukrainian	Male
Volodymyr Shcherbytsky	Влади́мир Щерби́цкий	Old	Died	1918	1990	1948	Ukrainian	Male
Eduard Shevardnadze	Эдуард Шеварднадзе	Old	Reelected	1928	2014	1936	Georgian	Male
Valentyna Shevchenko	Валентина Шевченко	New	Not	1935	2020	1957	Ukrainian	Female
Mikhail Shkabardnya	Михаил Шкабардня	Candidate	Not	1930	2025	1960	Russian	Male
Aleksey Shkolnikov	Алексей Шко́льников	Old	Resigned	1914	2003	1940	Russian	Male
Yevgeny Shulyak	Евгений Шуляк	New	Not	1939	Alive	1961	Belarusian	Male
Ivan Silayev	Ива́н Сила́ев	Old	Reelected	1930	2023	1959	Russian	Male
Vasily Sitnikov	Василий Ситников	New	Not	1927	2016	1948	Russian	Male
Yevgeny Sizenko	Евгений Сизенко	Old	Not	1931	2016	1953	Russian	Male
Yefim Slavsky	Ефи́м Сла́вский	Old	Not	1898	1991	1918	Russian	Male
Nikolay Slyunkov	Никола́й Слюнько́в	New	Not	1929	2022	1954	Belarusian	Male
Mikhail Smirtyukov	Михаи́л Смиртюко́в	Old	Not	1909	2004	1940	Russian	Male
Pavel Smolsky	Павел Смольский	New	Died	1931	1987	1955	Russian	Male
Valentin Smyslov	Валентин Смыслов	New	Not	1928	2004	1956	Russian	Male
Sergey Sokolov	Серге́й Соколо́в	Old	Resigned	1911	2012	1937	Russian	Male
Yefrem Sokolov	Ефре́м Соколо́в	Candidate	Reelected	1926	2022	1955	Belarusian	Male
Mikhail Solomentsev	Михаи́л Соло́менцев	Old	Resigned	1913	2008	1940	Russian	Male
Yuri Solovyev	Михаи́л Соло́менцев	Old	Not	1925	2011	1955	Russian	Male
Vladimir Stepanov	Владимир Степанов	New	Not	1927	2022	1952	Karelian	Male
Yegor Stroyev	Его́р Стро́ев	New	Reelected	1937	Alive	1958	Russian	Male
Boris Stukalin	Борис Стукалин	Old	Not	1923	2004	1943	Russian	Male
Apollon Systsov	Аполлон Сысцов	New	Not	1929	2005	1961	Russian	Male
Fikryat Tabeyev	Фикрят Табеев	Old	Not	1928	2015	1957	Russian	Male
Nikolai Talyzin	Никола́й Талы́зин	Old	Not	1929	1991	1960	Russian	Male
Vasily Taratuta	Василий Таратута	Old	Not	1930	2008	1955	Ukrainian	Male
Georgy Tarazevich	Георгий Таразевич	New	Not	1937	2003	1967	Belarusian	Male
Nikolay Tatarchuk	Николай Татарчук	New	Not	1928	1991	1955	Ukrainian	Male
Pyotr Telepnyov	Пётр Телепнёв	New	Not	1930	2013	1956	Belarusian	Male
Vladimir Terebilov	Владимир Теребилов	Candidate	Resigned	1916	2004	1940	Russian	Male
Nikolai Tereshchenko	Николай Терещенко	Candidate	Died	1930	1989	1955	Russian	Male
Valentina Tereshkova	Валентина Терешкова	Old	Not	1937	Alive	1960	Russian	Female
Vladimir Tikhomirov	Тихомиров Порфирович	Old	Not	1934	1997	1958	Russian	Male
Nikolai Tikhonov	Николай Тихонов	Old	Resigned	1905	1997	1940	Russian	Male
Aleksey Titarenko	Алексе́й Титаре́нко	Old	Resigned	1915	1992	1940	Ukrainian	Male
Lev Tolkunov	Лев Толкунов	Old	Died	1919	1989	1943	Russian	Male
Vladimir Tolubko	Влади́мир Толу́бко	Old	Died	1914	1989	1939	Ukrainian	Male
Ivan Tretyak	Иван Третьяк	Old	Not	1923	2007	1943	Ukrainian	Male
Pyotr Tretyakov	Пётр Третьяков	Candidate	Resigned	1927	2018	1957	Russian	Male
Yuri Trofimov	Юрий Трофимов	New	Died	1931	1989	1956	Russian	Male
Mikhail Trunov	Михаил Трунов	Old	Resigned	1931	2010	1955	Russian	Male
Yevgeny Tyazhelnikov	Евге́ний Тяже́льников	Old	Not	1928	2020	1951	Russian	Male
Raisa Udalaya	Раиса Удалая	New	Not	1931	2020	1974	Russian	Female
Gumer Usmanov	Гумер Усманов	Old	Not	1932	2015	1953	Tatar	Male
Inomjon Usmonxoʻjayev	Инамджан Усманходжаев	Old	Not	1930	2017	1958	Uzbek	Male
Vladimir Utkin	Владимир Уткин	Old	Not	1923	2000	1940	Russian	Male
Karl Vaino	Карл Вайно	Old	Not	1923	2022	1940	Estonian	Male
Grigory Vashchenko	Григорий Ващенко	Old	Resigned	1920	1990	1943	Ukrainian	Male
Nikolai Vasilyev	Павел Бородин	Old	Resigned	1916	2011	1942	Russian	Male
Gennady Vedernikov	Геннадий Ведерников	New	Not	1937	2001	1965	Russian	Male
Vladimir Velichko	Владимир Величко	New	Not	1937	Alive	1963	Russian	Male
Evgeny Velikhov	Евгений Велихов	Promoted	Not	1935	2024	1971	Russian	Male
Aleksandr Vlasov	Александр Власов	Old	Reelected	1932	2002	1956	Russian	Male
Boris Volodin	Борис Володин	New	Not	1931	2026	1955	Russian	Male
Arkady Volsky	Борис Володин	New	Reelected	1932	2006	1958	Russian	Male
Lev Voronin	Лев Воронин	Old	Not	1928	2008	1953	Russian	Male
Yuli Vorontsov	Ю́лий Воронцо́в	Old	Not	1929	2007	1956	Russian	Male
Mikhail Voropayev	Михаил Воропаев	Old	Not	1919	2009	1945	Russian	Male
Vitaly Vorotnikov	Вита́лий Воротнико́в	Old	Not	1926	2012	1950	Russian	Male
Augusts Voss	Август Восс	Old	Not	1916	1994	1940	Latvian	Male
Anatoly Voystrochenko	Анатолий Войстроченко	New	Not	1937	2010	1958	Russian	Male
Gennady Yagodin	Геннадий Ягодин	New	Reelected	1927	2015	1948	Russian	Male
Alexander Yakovlev	Алекса́ндр Я́ковлев	New	Not	1923	2005	1944	Russian	Male
Dmitry Yazov	Дми́трий Я́зов	Promoted	Reelected	1924	2020	1944	Russian	Male
Alexander Yefimov	Александр Ефимов	New	Not	1923	2012	1943	Russian	Male
Anatoly Yegorov	Анато́лий Его́ров	Old	Resigned	1920	1997	1944	Russian	Male
Yury Yelchenko	Юрий Ельченко	Old	Not	1929	2019	1953	Ukrainian	Male
Boris Yeltsin	Борис Ельцин	Old	Not	1931	2007	1961	Russian	Male
Nikolay Yemokhonov	Николай Емохонов	New	Not	1921	2014	1947	Russian	Male
Nikolay Yermakov	Николай Ермаков	New	Died	1927	1987	1961	Russian	Male
Lev Yermin	Ле́в Е́рмин	Old	Resigned	1923	2004	1943	Russian	Male
Neli Yershova	Нэли Ершова	Candidate	Not	1939	Alive	1973	Russian	Female
Aleksandr Yezhevsky	Александр Ежевский	Old	Resigned	1915	2017	1945	Russian	Male
Magomed Yusupov	Магомед Юсупов	New	Not	1935	2018	1959	Avar	Male
Vadim Zagladin	Вади́м Загла́дин	Old	Not	1927	2006	1955	Russian	Male
Mikhail Zaitsev	Михаи́л За́йцев	Old	Resigned	1923	2009	1943	Russian	Male
Vasily Zakharov	Василий Захаров	New	Not	1934	2023	1964	Russian	Male
Leonid Zamyatin	Леонид Замятин	Old	Not	1922	2019	1952	Russian	Male
Vladimir Zatvornitsky	Владимир Затворницкий	Old	Not	1929	2017	1958	Russian	Male
Lev Zaykov	Лев Зайков	Old	Not	1923	2002	1957	Russian	Male
Mikhail Zimyanin	Михаил Зимянин	Old	Resigned	1914	1995	1939	Belarusian	Male
Grigory Zolotukhin	Григо́рий Золоту́хин	Old	Died	1911	1988	1939	Russian	Male
Viktor Zorkaltsev	Виктор Зоркальцев	New	Not	1936	2010	1962	Russian	Male

=== Candidates ===
Candidate Members of the Central Committee of the 27th Congress of the Communist Party of the Soviet Union
Name	Cyrillic	26th CC	28th CC	Birth	Death	PM	Ethnicity	Gender
Veniamin Afonin	Серге́й Афана́сьев	New	Promoted	1931	2017	1957	Russian	Male
Geny Ageyev	Гений Агеев	New	Not	1929	1994	1952	Russian	Male
Timur Alimov	Тимур Алимов	New	Not	1936	2015	1967	Uzbek	Male
Georgy Alyoshin	Георгий Алёшин	New	Not	1931	2011	1957	Russian	Male
Nikolai Antonov	Никола́й Анто́нов	Candidate	Resigned	1921	1996	1944	Russian	Male
Makhmut Aripdzhanov	Махмут Арипджанов	New	Not	1938	Alive	1965	Uzbek	Male
Alexander Babenko	Александр Бабенко	New	Promoted	1935	Alive	1961	Russian	Male
Anatoly Basistov	Анатолий Басистов	New	Not	1920	1998	1945	Russian	Male
Boris Batsanov	Борис Бацанов	New	Not	1927	2005	1951	Russian	Male
Valery Belikov	Валерий Беликов	New	Died	1925	1987	1949	Russian	Male
Anatoly Belyakov	Анатолий Беляков	New	Not	1933	2017	1960	Russian	Male
Leonid Bibin	Леонид Бибин	New	Not	1930	Alive	1953	Ukrainian	Male
Ratmir Bobovikov	Ратмир Бобовиков	Candidate	Not	1927	2002	1947	Russian	Male
Leonid Bobykin	Леонид Бобыкин	New	Not	1930	Alive	1956	Russian	Male
Valery Boldin	Валерий Болдин	New	Promoted	1935	2006	1960	Russian	Male
Zoya Borovikova	Зоя Боровикова	New	Not	1939	1991	1968	Russian	Female
Yevgeny Brakov	Евге́ний Бра́ков	New	Not	1937	Alive	1963	Russian	Male
Vladimir Brezhnev	Владимир Брежнев	New	Not	1931	Alive	1959	Russian	Male
Karen Brutents	Карен Брутенц	New	Not	1924	2017	1945	Armenian	Male
Lidiya Bryzga	Лидия Брызга	New	Promoted	1943	2014	1975	Belarusian	Female
Alexander Budyka	Александр Будыка	New	Not	1927	1991	1949	Russian	Male
Sergey Burenkov	Сергей Буренков	Candidate	Resigned	1923	2004	1945	Russian	Male
Mikhail Busygin	Михаил Бусыгин	New	Not	1931	2016	1952	Russian	Male
Ivan Kalin	Иван Калин	Candidate	Not	1935	2012	1955	Moldovan	Male
Boris Chaplin	Бори́с Ча́плин	Candidate	Not	1931	2015	1961	Russian	Male
Yevgeny Chekharin	Евгений Чехарин	New	Not	1924	2001	1950	Russian	Male
Ivan Cherepanov	Иван Черепанов	New	Not	1929	2015	1957	Russian	Male
Valentin Chikin	Валентин Чикин	New	Member	1932	Alive	1956	Russian	Male
Nikolay Davydov	Николай Давыдов	New	Resigned	1928	2012	1952	Russian	Male
Viktor Dementsev	Виктор Деменцев	New	Resigned	1918	2010	1940	Russian	Male
Ivan Dmitriyev	Иван Дмитриев	Candidate	Not	1920	1992	1945	Russian	Male
Valentin Dmitriyev	Валентин Дмитриев	Candidate	Not	1927	2020	1947	Russian	Male
Nikolai Dybenko	Николай Дыбенко	Candidate	Not	1928	2002	1951	Russian	Male
Ismail Dzhabbarov	Исмаил Джаббаров	New	Not	1932	Alive	1959	Uzbek	Male
Valentin Falin	Baлeнтин Фaлин	New	Promoted	1926	2018	1953	Russian	Male
Konstantin Fomichenko	Константи́н Фомиче́нко	Candidate	Not	1927	2015	1948	Ukrainian	Male
Konstantin Frolov	Константин Фролов	New	Promoted	1932	2007	1965	Russian	Male
Natalya Gellert	Наталья Геллерт	New	Promoted	1953	Alive	1973	Russian	Female
Andrey Girenko	Андрей Гиренко	Candidate	Promoted	1936	2017	1963	Ukrainian	Male
Ivan Gladky	Иван Гладкий	New	Not	1930	2001	1953	Ukrainian	Male
Nikolai Glushkov	Николай Глушков	New	Resigned	1918	1999	1945	Russian	Male
Marat Gramov	Марат Грамов	New	Not	1927	1998	1951	Russian	Male
Nikolai Gribachev	Николай Грибачёв	Candidate	Not	1910	1992	1943	Russian	Male
Vladimir Grigoriev	Николай Грибачёв	New	Promoted	1941	2011	1960	Belarusian	Male
Oles Gonchar	Оле́сь Гонча́р	Candidate	Not	1918	1995	1946	Ukrainian	Male
Leonid Illichev	Леонид Ильичёв	Candidate	Not	1906	1990	1924	Russian	Male
Tatyana Ivanova	Татьяна Иванова	Candidate	Not	1939	Alive	1968	Russian	Female
Vladimir Ivashko	Владимир Ивашко	New	Promoted	1932	1994	1960	Ukrainian	Male
Alexander Levlev	Александр Иевлев	New	Not	1926	2004	1950	Russian	Male
Gayrat Kadyrov	Гайрат Кадыров	New	Not	1939	Alive	1963	Uzbek	Male
Zakash Kamalidenov	Закаш Камалиденов	New	Resigned	1936	2017	1960	Kazakh	Male
Aleksey Kamay	Алексей Камай	New	Member	1936	Alive	1960	Belarusian	Male
Ivan Kapitanets	Ива́н Капита́нец	New	Not	1928	2018	1952	Russian	Male
Yury Karabasov	Юрий Карабасов	New	Not	1939	2021	1962	Russian	Male
Vladimir Karpov	Владимир Карпов	New	Promoted	1922	2010	1943	Russian	Male
Valentina Kasimova	Валентина Касимова	New	Promoted	1944	Alive	1972	Russian	Female
Vasily Kazakov	Василий Казаков	Candidate	Not	1929	2008	1955	Russian	Male
Izatullo Khayoyev	Изатулло Хаёев	New	Member	1936	2015	1961	Tajik	Male
Leonid Khitrun	Леонид Хитрун	New	Member	1930	2009	1955	Belarusian	Male
Tikhon Khrennikov	Тихон Хренников	Candidate	Not	1913	2007	1940	Russian	Male
Tukhtakhon Kirgizbayeva	Тухтахон Киргизбаева	New	Promoted	1942	Alive	1965	Uzbek	Female
Gennady Kiselyov	Геннадий Киселёв	New	Not	1936	Alive	1961	Russian	Male
Leonid Klotskov	Леонид Герасимович Клёцков	Candidate	Not	1918	1997	1966	Belarusian	Male
Stepan Kleyko	Степан Клейко	New	Promoted	1935	Alive	1966	Russian	Male
Yury Kochetkov	Юрий Кочетков	New	Not	1932	1996	1956	Russian	Male
Alexey Kolbeshkin	Алексей Колбешкин	New	Promoted	1945	Alive	1976	Russian	Male
Georgy Kolmogorov	Георгий Колмогоров	New	Not	1929	Alive	1952	Russian	Male
Yuri Kolomiyets	Юрий Коломиец	Candidate	Not	1925	2014	1953	Ukrainian	Male
Nikolai Komarov	Николай Комаров	Candidate	Resigned	1918	2003	1945	Russian	Male
Vasily Konovalov	Василий Коновалов	New	Resigned	1926	Alive	1947	Russian	Male
Anatoly Konstantinov	Анатолий Константинов	New	Resigned	1923	2006	1943	Russian	Male
Valentin Koptyug	Валентин Коптюг	New	Promoted	1931	1997	1961	Russian	Male
Aleksandr Korkin	Алекса́ндр Ко́ркин	Candidate	Not	1927	2011	1949	Russian	Male
Mikhail Korolyov	Михаил Королёв	New	Not	1931	2016	1960	Russian	Male
Temirbek Koshoyev	Темирбек Кошоев	New	Resigned	1931	2009	1952	Kyrgyz	Male
Yevgeny Kozlovsky	Евге́ний Козло́вский	Candidate	Not	1929	2022	1955	Russian	Male
Boris Kravtsov	Борис Кравцов	Candidate	Not	1922	Alive	1943	Russian	Male
Vasily Kryuchkov	Василий Крючков	Candidate	Not	1928	2017	1949	Russian	Male
Orazbek Kuanyshev	Оразбек Куанышев	Candidate	Not	1935	1999	1961	Kazakh	Male
Lev Kulidzhanov	Лев Кулиджанов	Candidate	Not	1924	2002	1962	Armenian	Male
Yuly Kvitsinsky	Юлий Квицинский	New	Promoted	1936	2010	1952	Russian	Male
Ivan Laptev	Иван Лаптев	New	Not	1934	2025	1960	Russian	Male
Vladimir Listov	Владимир Листов	Candidate	Not	1931	2014	1962	Russian	Male
Yuri Lobov	Юрий Лобов	New	Promoted	1942	Alive	1975	Russian	Male
Vadim Loginov	Вадим Логинов	New	Not	1927	2016	1950	Russian	Male
Pyotr Luchinsky	Вадим Логинов	New	Promoted	1941	Alive	1964	Moldovans	Male
Vladimir Lukyanenko	Владимир Лукьяненко	New	Member	1937	Alive	1963	Ukrainian	Male
Nikolai Lunkov	Никола́й Лунько́в	Candidate	Not	1919	2021	1940	Russian	Male
Salidzhan Mamarasulov	Салиджан Мамарасулов	New	Member	1930	2005	1958	Uzbek	Male
Vitaliy Masol	Виталий Масол	New	Promoted	1928	2018	1956	Ukrainian	Male
Mikhail Matafonov	Михаил Матафонов	Candidate	Resigned	1928	2012	1952	Russian	Male
Tengiz Menteshashvili	Тенгиз Ментешашвили	New	Not	1928	2016	1952	Georgian	Male
Galina Merkulova	Галина Меркулова	New	Promoted	1951	Alive	1976	Uzbek	Female
Guram Metonidze	Гурам Метонидзе	New	Promoted	1935	Alive	1964	Georgian	Male
Alexander Meshkov	Александр Мешков	New	Not	1927	1994	1953	Russian	Male
Viktor Mironenko	Виктор Мироненко	New	Promoted	1953	Alive	1975	Ukrainian	Male
Pavel Mozhayev	Павел Можаев	New	Not	1930	1991	1958	Russian	Male
Salamat Mukashev	Саламат Мукашев	New	Resigned	1927	2004	1950	Kazakh	Male
Rysbek Myrzashev	Рысбек Мырзашев	New	Died	1932	1987	1960	Kazakh	Male
Mikhail Nenashev	Михаи́л Нена́шев	Candidate	Promoted	1929	2019	1952	Russian	Male
Vladilen Nikitin	Владилен Никитин	New	Not	1936	2021	1965	Russian	Male
Valentin Nikiforov	Валентин Никифоров	New	Not	1934	2021	1958	Russian	Male
Boris Nikolsky	Борис Никольский	New	Not	1937	2007	1963	Russian	Male
Ivan Obraztsov	Иван Образцов	Candidate	Not	1920	2005	1944	Russian	Male
Vladimir Osipov	Владимир Осипов	New	Promoted	1933	Alive	1958	Russian	Male
Yuri Ovchinnikov	Юрий Овчинников	Candidate	Died	1934	1988	1962	Russian	Male
Valentina Parshina	Валентина Паршина	Candidate	Promoted	1937	2020	1965	Russian	Female
Pyotr Paskar	Пётр Паскарь	Candidate	Not	1929	2025	1956	Moldovan	Male
Nikolai Pavlov	Николай Павлов	New	Promoted	1950	Alive	1978	Russian	Male
Ivan Pentyukhov	Иван Пентюхов	New	Promoted	1929	1997	1962	Russian	Male
Aleksey Petrishchev	Алексей Петрищев	Candidate	Died	1924	1986	1951	Russian	Male
Yevgeny Podolsky	Евгений Подольский	New	Member	1934	2011	1959	Russian	Male
Yakiv Pogrebnyak	Я́ков Погребня́к	Candidate	Not	1928	2016	1943	Ukrainian	Male
Mikhail Popkov	Михаил Попков	Candidate	Not	1924	Alive	1943	Russian	Male
Nikolay Popov	Николай Попов	Candidate	Not	1931	2008	1960	Russian	Male
Grigory Posibeyev	Григо́рий Посибе́ев	Candidate	Member	1935	2002	1959	Mari	Male
Yevgeny Primakov	Евгений Примаков	New	Promoted	1929	2015	1959	Russian	Male
Albert Rachkov	Альбе́рт Рачко́в	Candidate	Not	1927	2023	1955	Russian	Male
Leonid Radyukevich	Леонид Радюкевич	Candidate	Not	1932	Alive	1959	Belarusian	Male
Vladimir Reshetilov	Владимир Решетилов	New	Not	1937	Alive	1963	Ukrainian	Male
Viktor Rodin	Виктор Родин	New	Not	1928	2011	1950	Russian	Male
Dmitry Romanin	Дмитрий Романин	New	Not	1929	1996	1952	Russian	Male
Ivan Romazan	Иван Ромазан	New	Promoted	1934	1991	1964	Russian	Male
Jurijs Rubenis	Юрий Рубэн	Candidate	Resigned	1925	2004	1953	Latvian	Male
Aleksey Rybakov	Алексей Рыбаков	Candidate	Resigned	1925	2016	1945	Russian	Male
Mikhail Ryzhikov	Михаил Рыжиков	New	Not	1930	Alive	1953	Russian	Male
Hasan Sayidov	Гасан Сеидов	New	Resigned	1932	2004	1956	Azerbaijani	Male
Vytautas Sakalauskas	Витаутас Сакалаускас	New	Not	1933	2001	1960	Lithuanian	Male
Akil Salimov	Акил Салимов	New	Not	1928	2014	1957	Uzbek	Male
Fadey Sargsyan	Фадей Саркисян	New	Resigned	1923	2010	1945	Armenian	Male
Bruno Saul	Бруно Саул	New	Not	1932	2022	1960	Estonian	Male
Lev Shapiro	Лев Шапиро	Candidate	Resigned	1927	2021	1959	Ukrainian	Male
Arkady Shchepetilnikov	Аркадий Щепетильников	New	Not	1930	Alive	1958	Ukrainian	Male
Sergey Shcherbakov	Сергей Щербаков	New	Not	1925	1992	1944	Russian	Male
Grigory Shirshin	Григо́рий Ши́ршин	Candidate	Member	1934	Alive	1958	Tuvan	Male
Aleksandr Shitov	Александр Шитов	Candidate	Not	1925	2001	1955	Russian	Male
Nikolay Shubnikov	Николай Шубников	New	Resigned	1924	Alive	1946	Russian	Male
Vladimir Shuralyov	Владимир Шуралёв	New	Not	1935	2020	1959	Russian	Male
Vladimir Sidorov	Владимир Сидоров	Candidate	Not	1924	2000	1949	Russian	Male
Ivan Skiba	Иван Скиба	New	Not	1937	Alive	1959	Ukrainian	Male
Yuri Sklyarov	Юрий Скляров	Candidate	Resigned	1925	2013	1944	Russian	Male
Pyotr Slyozko	Петро Слєзко	New	Not	1931	2004	1954	Russian	Male
Georgy Smirnov	Гео́ргий Смирно́в	Candidate	Not	1922	1999	1943	Russian	Male
Viktor Smirnov	Виктор Смирнов	New	Not	1929	Alive	1951	Russian	Male
Boris Snetkov	Виктор Смирнов	New	Not	1925	2006	1945	Russian	Male
Vitaly Sologub	Виталий Сологу	Candidate	Not	1926	2004	1927	Ukrainian	Male
Alexey Sorokin	Виктор Смирнов	New	Not	1922	2020	1943	Russian	Male
Lev Spiridonov	Лев Спиридонов	New	Not	1931	2009	1956	Russian	Male
Nikolai Stashenkov	Николай Сташенков	New	Not	1934	Alive	1960	Russian	Male
Vladimir Toropov	Владимир Торопов	New	Not	1938	1996	1962	Russian	Male
Oleg Troyanovsky	Олег Трояновский	New	Not	1919	2003	1947	Russian	Male
Gennady Ulanov	Олег Трояновский	New	Not	1929	2018	1956	Russian	Male
Yuri Valov	Юрий Валов	New	Not	1934	2012	1961	Russian	Male
Valentin Varennikov	Валентин Варенников	New	Not	1923	2009	1944	Russian	Male
Yevgeny Varnachyov	Евгений Варначёв	New	Not	1932	2018	1963	Russian	Male
Lev Vasilyev	Лев Васильев	New	Not	1925	2023	1951	Russian	Male
Igor Velichko	Игорь Величко	New	Not	1934	2014	1964	Ukrainian	Male
Evgeny Velikhov	Евгений Велихов	New	Promoted	1935	2024	1971	Russian	Male
Ivan Vladychenko	Ива́н Влады́ченко	Candidate	Not	1924	2022	1943	Ukrainian	Male
Gennady Voronovsky	Геннадий Вороновский	New	Resigned	1924	Alive	1955	Russian	Male
Ivan Yastrebov	Иван Я́стребов	Candidate	Resigned	1911	2002	1941	Russian	Male
Bally Yazkuliyev	Баллы Язкулиев	Candidate	Not	1930	Alive	1953	Turkmen	Male
Anatoly Yefimov	Анатолий Ефимов	New	Member	1939	Alive	1966	Russian	Male
Georgy Yegorov	Гео́ргий Его́ров	New	Resigned	1918	2008	1942	Russian	Male
Yevgeny Yeliseyev	Евгений Елисеев	New	Not	1936	Alive	1959	Russian	Male
Filipp Yermash	Филипп Ермаш	Candidate	Resigned	1923	2002	1945	Russian	Male
Vladimir Zakharov	Владимир Захаров	Candidate	Not	1936	Alive	1961	Russian	Male
Yuri Zhukov	Юрий Жуков;	Candidate	Resigned	1908	1991	1943	Russian	Male
