= Alexander Melnikov =

Alexander Melnikov may refer to:

- Alexander Melnikov (pianist) (born 1973), Russian pianist
- Alexander Melnikov (politician) (1930–2011), Soviet and Russian politician
