= Lidziya Bryzha =

- Лидия Брыжа
- Born: Lidziya Dmitrievna Bryzha; 6 May 1943; Barysy, Tamašoŭski sieĺsaviet, Byelorussian SSR
- Died: 14 May 2014 (aged 71)
- Occupations: Milkmaid; Machine milking operator
- Years active: 1959–2003
- Children: 4
- Awards: Order of the Badge of Honour, Order of the October Revolution; Hero of Socialist Labour; Order of Lenin (x2)

Lidziya Dmitrievna Bryzha (Belarusian: Лідзія Дзмітрыеўна Брыжа; Russian: Лидия Дмитриевна Брыжа; 6 May 1943 – 14 May 2014) was a Belarusian milkmaid and machine milking operator who worked on the A.A. Zhdanov collective farm. She was a deputy of the Supreme Soviet of the Soviet Union, the Supreme Soviet of the Byelorussian Soviet Socialist Republic and was on both the Central Auditing Commission of the Communist Party of the Soviet Union and the Central Committee of the Communist Party of the Soviet Union. Bryzha was awarded the Order of the Badge of Honour, the Order of the October Revolution, the Order of Lenin twice and given the title of Hero of Socialist Labour.

== Early life ==
Bryzha was born in German-occupied village of Barysy (then called Domachevsky), Brest region, Byelorussian SSR on 6 May 1943. Her parents, Dmitry Isakovich and Elena Andreyevna Virchikov, were farmers. Bryzha had a younger sister. Their father was killed in fighting at the Hungarian city of Sopron on 31 March 1945. Thus, Bryzha and her siblings were brought up by their mother.

== Career ==
In 1959, following the completion of her education at the local junior high school, she began working as a field worker producing crops at the A. A. Zhdanov collective farm in Barysy. During that time, Bryzha was heavily influenced by the milkmaid Lidiya Osiyuk, whom she worked with. The following year, she was moved to the Zhdanov dairy farm and worked as a milkmaid. Bryzha initially helped other milkmaids and was later entrusted with first-calf heifers. She learned the formulation of animal feeding rations, mastered machine milking, and developed a deep knowledge of milking cows.

Following the lead of the Estonian milkmaid Leida Peips, in 1975 she was one of the first in the region to transition to tending a larger group of cows. Bryzha was a frequent participant in the Exhibition of Achievements of National Economy (VDNKh) and won medals. In 1977, she participated in a meeting of the country's advanced livestock breeders at the VDNKh USSR, and established a machine milking operators school. In 1985, Bryzha and her family relocated to Astramiečava, Brest region and became a machine milking operator at a dairy farm called Pamyat Ilyicha collective farm (today the Ostromechevo agricultural production cooperative) in the village of Rudaviec. She had responsibility for 85 cows and 15 heifers. Bryzha may have retired in 1993 but continued working for a decade. She milked an average of 5,000 to 8,000 kg (11,000 to 18,000 lb) kilograms of milk per cow per year over the course of her career. Bryzha retired in 2003.

She was involved in politics. Brzyha became a member of the Communist Party of the Soviet Union in 1975. She was elected to serve as a deputy in the ninth convocation of the Soviet of the Union of the Supreme Soviet of the Soviet Union from 1974 to 1979 and in the tenth convocation of the Supreme Soviet of the Byelorussian Soviet Socialist Republic between 1980 and 1985 and was member of the Credentials Committee. Brzyha was a delegate to the 26th Congress of the Communist Party of the Soviet Union in 1981 and the 27th Congress of the Communist Party of the Soviet Union in 1986. She was a member of the Central Auditing Commission of the Communist Party of the Soviet Union from 1981 to 1986. Brzyha was a candidate member of the 27th Congress of the Central Committee of the Communist Party of the Soviet Union between 1986 and 1987 and was upgraded to a full member, serving from 1987 to 1990. Bryzha was the leader of the district club of five-thousand-year-old dairy farmers.

== Personal life ==
She was married to Nikolai Alexandrovich and they had four children. Bryzha died on 14 May 2014.

== Recognition ==
She was awarded the Order of the Badge of Honour on 22 March 1966 and the Order of the October Revolution on 6 September 1973. Bryzha was a laureate of the Byelorussian SSR State Prize in 1976 and was presented with the Order of Lenin that same year. She was awarded the title of Hero of Socialist Labour with the Order of Lenin and the "Hammer and Sickle" gold medal by the Presidium of the Supreme Soviet of the Soviet Union on 16 March 1981. Bryzha was made a Honorary Citizen of the Brest District, Brest Region in 2009. A memorial plaque in her honour was installed at her home in Astramiečava.
