= Nikolay Kruchina =

Soviet treasurer and kleptocrat

- Николай Кручина
- Kruchina in 1974

Administrator of Affairs of the Central Committee
- In office September 1982 – 26 August 1991
- Preceded by: Georgy Pavlov
- Succeeded by: Post abolished

First Secretary of the Tselinograd Regional Committee of the Communist Party of Kazakhstan
- In office November 1965 – 4 April 1978
- Preceded by: Vasily Demidenko
- Succeeded by: Nikolay Morozov

Full member of the 25th, 26th, 27th, 28th Central Committee
- In office 5 March 1976 – 26 August 1991

Candidate member of the 24th Central Committee
- In office 9 April 1971 – 5 March 1976

Personal details
- Born: 14 May 1928 Novopokrovka, Khabarsky District, Siberian Krai, Russian SFSR, Soviet Union
- Died: 26 August 1991 (aged 63) Moscow, Soviet Union
- Cause of death: Suicide by falling from height
- Party: Communist Party of the Soviet Union

Nikolay Yefimovich Kruchina (Russian: Николай Ефимович Кручина; 14 May 1928 – 26 August 1991) was a top Soviet communist official, the administrator of affairs of the Central Committee of the Communist Party of the Soviet Union (CPSU) since 1983 and until his death, effectively the party's chief treasurer, responsible for its enormous assets (popularly dubbed as the party's gold, Russian: золото Партии) estimated to be worth nearly $9 billion, which have never been located since.

== Career ==
Born in Siberian Krai (now Altai Krai), Kruchina joined the party in 1949. In 1962 he became an instructor for the Agricultural Department of the CPSU. In 1963–1965 he was a secretary of the Tselinny Krai Committee of the Communist Party in the Kazakh SSR, in 1965–1978—the First Secretary of the Tselinograd Oblast Committee of the Communist Party in the Kazakh SSR. In 1973 he was awarded Hero of Socialist Labour. In 1971 Kruchina entered the Central Auditing Committee of the CPSU. In 1971 he became a candidate member and in 1976 a full member of the CPSU Central Committee. In 1978–1983 served as a first deputy chairman of the Agricultural Department of the CPSU then headed by Mikhail Gorbachev, became its chairman after Gorbachev in 1983 and in the same year, after Yuri Andropov's assumption of power, finally replaced Georgy Pavlov as the party's administrator of affairs (upravlyayushchiy delami). It is known that Kruchina's office transferred millions of dollars as a Soviet help to foreign Communist Parties. For the last time Kruchina visited his office on August 19, the day the abortive Soviet coup attempt of 1991 started. In 1966–1989 he was also a Deputy in the Supreme Soviet of the Soviet Union and in 1989–1991 People's Deputy of the Soviet Union.

== Death ==
Kruchina died as a result of falling out of the window of his apartment in Moscow in the early morning of 26 August, five days after the coup attempt. He allegedly left two suicide notes, in which he claimed that he was not a plotter, despite having never been publicly linked to the attempted coup. He apparently left near his desk on the armchair a thick file of recent Communist Party's illegal commercial operations. This was not the only alleged suicide among the Soviet leadership at that time. Soviet Interior Minister Boris Pugo, one of the plotters, allegedly shot his wife and himself in their apartment on 22 August, while Marshal Sergey Akhromeyev, Adviser to the President of the Soviet Union on military affairs, allegedly hanged himself in his office on 24 August. On 6 October, Kruchina's predecessor, Georgy Pavlov, fell to his death. On 17 October, Dmitry Lisovolik, former deputy chief of the party's international department, was also found dead in the same manner several weeks after investigators found $600,000 in the office of his boss, Valentin Falin. Kruchina was laid to rest at the Troyekurovskoye Cemetery.
