= Konstantin Frolov =

Russian scientist and engineer (1932–2007)

Konstantin Vasilyevich Frolov
- Константи́н Васи́льевич Фролов
- Born: July 22, 1932; Pesochnya, Russian SFSR, Soviet Union
- Died: November 18, 2007 (aged 75); Moscow, Russia
- Resting place: Troyekurovskoye Cemetery; 55°42′00″N 37°24′32″E
- Education: The Institute of Mechanical Engineering of the Academy of Sciences of the Soviet Union
- Known for: Oscillations
- Awards: Hero of Socialist Labour, Lenin Prize
- Scientific career
- Fields: Mechanical engineering
- Thesis: Oscillations in machines with variable parameters in application to the dynamics of a power hydraulic drive (1970)

Signature
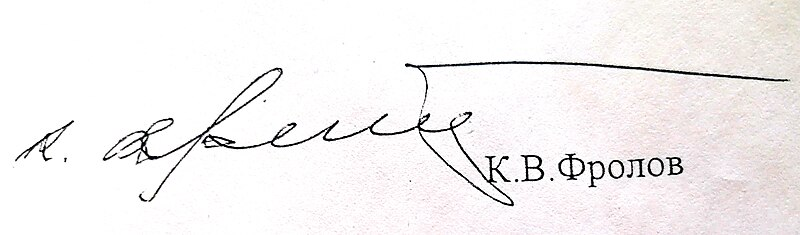

Konstantin Vasilyevich Frolov (Russian: Константи́н Васи́льевич Фролов; 22 July 1932 – 18 November 2007) was a Soviet and Russian academician, engineer, and scientist. He primarily worked in the field of mechanical engineering, specifically with oscillations and biomechanics. He served as vice president of the Russian Academy of Sciences from 1985 until 1996.

== Early life ==
Frolov was born on 22 July 1932 in the village of Pesochnya, which today is known as Kirov, to Vasily Ivanovich and Alexandra Sergeevna, who were both employees. His father, Vasily, was repressed early on in Frolov's life in 1937 during the period of the Great Purge to consolidate Joseph Stalin's power. Following his father's death, his mother who was a radiologist, would raise him alone having to work multiple shifts in the city and military hospital.

After he graduated from the 7th grade, Frolov enrolled in the Lyudinovo Mechanical Engineering College, where he would also work as a laboratory assistant. After graduating from secondary school at the college, he entered Bryansk Institute of Transport Engineering. During his time at the university, he studied under the head of the Department of Theoretical Mechanics along with the Theory of Machines and Mechanics, B.V. Kalinsky, who would later become his friend.

Upon graduating with honors in 1956, he immediately started working at the Leningrad Metal Plant. His work there consisted of designing steam and gas turbines. This is also the period in time when he would publish his very first scientific article on non-contact strain gauges.

== Career ==
In 1958 he left his job at the plant to attend the postgraduate school The Institute of Mechanical Engineering of the Academy of Sciences of the Soviet Union (IMASH) in Moscow. He completed his studies there in 1961. The following year, he defended his dissertation called "Influence of energy source properties on oscillations of autonomous systems" to be awarded his Candidate of Sciences. After defending his thesis, he started working at his alma mater, becoming in 1964 the head of the laboratory of vibration technology research there and a senior research assistant. He then became a Doctor of Sciences in 1970, defending his thesis titled "Oscillations in machines with variable parameters in application to the dynamics of a power hydraulic drive".

Upon finishing his studies, he became a professor in 1971. Then, in 1975, he became director of the Institute of Mechanical Engineering of the Russian Academy of Sciences, where he had graduated which he would direct until his death. Alongside this, starting in 1973 until 1976, he was the head of theoretical mechanics at the Moscow Technological Institute of Light Industry part-time. In 1976, he became a corresponding member of the Academy of Sciences of the Soviet Union, becoming a full member as an academician in 1984. That year, after leaving the Moscow institute, he became head of the Department of Theory of Machines and Mechanisms at Bauman Moscow State Technical University.

From 1985-1996 he was the Vice President of the Russian Academy of Sciences. In 1991, he was elected chairman of the society "Znanie". He also signed the 1992 document World Scientists' Warning to Humanity, which was also signed by other prominent Russian scientists like Andrei Monin and Yuri Osipyan.

=== Political activities ===
A member of the Communist Party of the Soviet Union since 1965, he became a candidate member of the Central Committee from 1986 until 1989. After 1989, he became a member of the Central Committee's 27th Congress, although he would not return for the 28th. In addition to this, probably around the same time, he was a People's Deputy from the Union of Friendship Societies.

In the 1993 Russian legislative election, he was one of the candidates for the party Dignity and Charity, which won 3 seats. Later, in the 2007 Civic Chamber of the Russian Federation, he served as Chairman of the Commission of the Civic Chamber on Innovations, High-Tech Scientific and Engineering Projects.

== Death ==
Frolov died on 18 November 2007 after a severe illness. Russian president Vladimir Putin paid tribute to him calling Frolov, "An outstanding scientist, a major organizer, a person infinitely devoted to his work..." He was buried at Troyekurovskoye Cemetery.

== Legacy ==
He made numerous contributions to mechanical oscillations, biomechanics of environment systems, nuclear reactors, ergonomics, and safety problems. His main areas of research were in oscillations in nonlinear mechanical systems with limited drive power, vibration protection of machines, models of oscillations in human–machine systems, vibration in machines, and the strength and reliability of power machines like nuclear reactors. He specifically pioneered the scientific direction of the complex system of "man-machine-environment".

His work led to the increase of defense capabilities in Russia, with his ideas being used in state projects to create aircraft, hydrogen rocket engines, nuclear power reactors, and ensuring the secrecy of underwater objects.

== Honors ==
He was an honorary member of the International Federation for the Promotion of Mechanism and Machine Science since 1999.

- Hero of Socialist Labour
- Order "For Merit to the Fatherland" 2nd class (2007)
- Order "For Merit to the Fatherland" 3rd class (1999)
- 2x Order of Lenin
- Order of the Red Banner of Labour
- Lenin Prize (1988)
- USSR State Prize (1986)
