= Boris Gostev =

Soviet politician (1927–2015)

- Борис Гостев
- Gostev in 1988

Minister of Finance
- In office 14 December 1985 – 17 July 1989
- Premier: Nikolai Ryzhkov
- Preceded by: Vasily Garbuzov
- Succeeded by: Valentin Pavlov

Head of the Economic Department of the Central Committee
- In office August – December 1985
- Preceded by: Nikolai Ryzhkov
- Succeeded by: Nikolay Slyunkov
- In office September 1975 – 1982
- Preceded by: Post established
- Succeeded by: Nikolai Ryzhkov

Full member of the 26th, 27th of the Central Committee
- In office 3 March 1981 – 14 July 1990

Candidate member of the 25th of the Central Committee
- In office 5 March 1976 – 3 March 1981

Personal details
- Born: 15 September 1927 Moscow, Russian SFSR, Soviet Union
- Died: 10 August 2015 (aged 87) Moscow, Russia
- Party: Communist Party of the Soviet Union (1954–1990)
- Education: Moscow Technological Institute of Light Industry
- Profession: Engineer; economist

Boris Ivanovich Gostev (Russian: Борис Иванович Гостев; 15 September 1927 – 10 August 2015) was a Soviet engineer, economist and politician.

== Biography ==
Gostev was born in 1927. He served an as aide to Prime Minister Nikolai Ryzhkov. He was a deputy under Ryzhkov in the economic department of the Communist Party Central Committee. Gostev was appointed minister of finance on 14 December 1985, replacing long-term finance minister Vasily Garbuzov in the post. Gostev's term ended on 17 July 1989. He died in 2015.
