= Filipp Bobkov =

Soviet-Russian KGB functionary (1925-2019)

Filipp Denisovich Bobkov
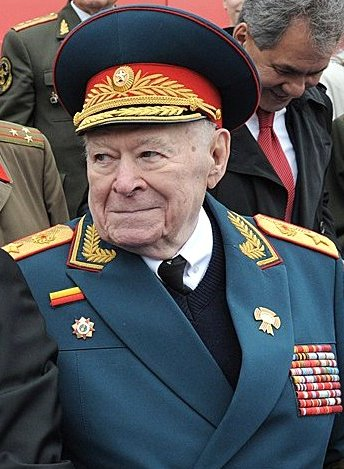
- Bobkov in 2012
- Native name: Филипп Денисович Бобков
- Nickname: KGB's Brain
- Born: 1 December 1925; Chervona Kam'yanka, Ukrainian Soviet Socialist Republic, Soviet Union (now Ukraine)
- Died: 17 June 2019 (aged 93) Moscow, Russia
- Allegiance: Soviet Union
- Branch: Red Army (until 1945); NKGB (1945–1946); MGB (1946–1953); KGB (1953–1992)
- Service years: 1942–1992
- Rank: Army General
- Commands: Fifth Main Directorate of the KGB
- Conflicts: World War II; Operation Büffel; Battle of Smolensk; Baltic offensive; Battles of the Courland Bridgehead; Jeltoqsan; Sumgait massacres; January Events
- Awards: Order of Lenin Order of the October Revolution Order of the Red Banner of Labour Medal "For the Victory over Germany in the Great Patriotic War 1941–1945"

Filipp Denisovich Bobkov (Russian: Фили́пп Дени́сович Бобко́в; 1 December 1925 – 17 June 2019) was a Soviet and Russian KGB functionary, who worked as the chief of the KGB sub-unit responsible for repressing dissent (Fifth Main Directorate), which was responsible for suppression of internal dissent in the former Soviet Union. He was widely regarded as the chief KGB ideologist or "KGB brain."

== Service in the Soviet secret services ==
Bobkov began his career in the Soviet secret services—then known as the People's Commissariat for State Security, or NKGB—in 1945, under the guidance of Lavrentiy Beria. In the power struggles that followed the death of Soviet leader Joseph Stalin, Bobkov survived Beria's removal and execution, and later outlasted eleven subsequent chairmen of the Ministry of State Security (MGB) and KGB. During the 1970s and 1980s, he "effectively became the KGB's real chairman, although officially he held the post of first deputy," according to Russian investigative journalist Yevgenia Albats.

=== Creation of front organizations ===
Bobkov was very instrumental in creation of KGB-controlled political organizations, such as the Anti-Zionist Committee of the Soviet Public, established in 1983. He also allegedly invented the Liberal Democratic Party of Russia, according to Soviet Politburo member Alexander Yakovlev. However, Bobkov denied these allegations, saying that he did not support the creation of a "Zubatov-style pseudo-party under KGB control, which directs interests and sentiments of certain social groups."

=== Ethnic conflicts ===
As described in his official biography, Bobkov was personally engaged in resolving ethnic conflicts in the Soviet Union. This included incidents such as the Sumgait pogrom, the January Events in Lithuania, the 1989 tribal clashes in Uzbekistan, and the Jeltoqsan. Former Politburo deputy and reformist leader Alexander Yakovlev, however, has claimed that Bobkov did not solve these conflicts, but rather created them in an effort to maintain the power of the KGB by showing its necessity.

=== Perestroika ===
According to Bobkov, perestroika had been invented by him and his KGB colleagues: "We in the KGB contributed quite a bit to the process of perestroika because [...] without it the Soviet Union could not move ahead."

Documents discovered by political scientist Robert van Voren in the Stasi archives show that in summer 1989 Bobkov came to Berlin and told Stasi Director Erich Mielke that German reunification was the work of mentally ill persons.

Bobkov allegedly supervised the transfer of Communist Party money to foreign banks prior to the 1991 Soviet coup d'état attempt. In October 1990, Bobkov ordered the creation of commercial firms and banks, which were managed by KGB officers and their "trusted contacts." The project was funded by KGB and Party money, "which made up almost 80% of the amount invested in the new banks, stock exchanges, and businesses in 1990-1991," according to the testimony of Richard Palmer to the United States Congress regarding Soviet infiltration of the Western financial system. Nikolay Kruchina, a high ranking CPSU official who was officially responsible for supervising the Communist Party money, fell to his death from the window of his luxury apartment in Moscow soon after the events.

=== Post-Soviet Russia ===
Bobkov officially retired in 1991 and organized a private security service in the Media Most company called SB MOST Group (Russian: СБ „Группы МОСТ“), which included thousands of his former KGB colleagues. The entire archive of 5th KGB Main Directorate was taken to Media-Most. This security service allegedly organized an attempted assassination of Russian oligarch Boris Berezovsky in 1994. On 3 July 2000, the FreeLance Bureau (FLB) under its editor-in-chief Sergei Sokolov released what was called Russiagate (Russian: "Рашенгейт") or the “Database of SB MOST Group” (Russian: «База данных СБ „Группы МОСТ“») although Sokolov stated that in addition to the MOST Group Security Bureau's database, Sokolov released other files, transcripts, etc from the FSB and other security structures as well.

His daughter Dasha or Daria Bobkova (Russian: Дарья Бобкова) heads the Spanish branch of Most-Bank (Russian: Мост-Банк - Испанский).

He also worked as a personal security adviser of Russian Parliament speaker Ruslan Khasbulatov.

Bobkov died on 17 June 2019.
