= Valentina Parshina =

Russian and Soviet agronomist and politician

- Born: Valentina Romanovna Parshina; 16 March 1937; Maslyakovo, Dregelsky District, Leningrad Oblast (today the Lyubotinsky District, Novgorod Oblast), Russian SFSR
- Died: 21 December 2020 (aged 83)
- Occupations: Agronomist, politician
- Years active: 1959–2001

Valentina Romanovna Parshina (Russian: Валентина Романовна Паршина; 16 March 1937 – 21 December 2020) was a Soviet and Russian agronomist and politician. She was a foreman of vegetable growers at the Detskoselsky Order of Lenin state farm as well as an elected member of the 10th and 11th convocations of the Supreme Soviet of the Soviet Union and was on the Central Committee of the Communist Party of the Soviet Union between 1989 and 1990. Parshina and her team gave food to the Soviet state and became self-sufficient with more than 100 employees. She was honoured with the Order of the Red Banner of Labour, twice the Order of Lenin with the title of Hero of Socialist Labour, the "Hammer and Sickle" gold medal and the Order of the October Revolution.

== Early life ==
On 16 March 1937, Parshina was born into a large peasant family in the village of Maslyakovo, Dregelsky District, Leningrad Oblast (today the Lyubotinsky District, Novgorod Oblast). Her mother was a worker on a collective farm and her father worked as a lumberjack. Parshina developed a likeness digging in her family's garden from a young age. Following her graduation from school, she enrolled in the vegetable growing department of the Agricultural Institute in Pushkin (today the Saint Petersburg State Agrarian University), from which she graduated on 21 December 1959. Parshina defended her diploma in the specialty "agronomist-horticultural grower".

== Career ==
After she graduated from the agricultural institute, she was sent to work at the Detskoselsky Order of Lenin state farm in the Tosnensky district, Leningrad region as a foreman of vegetable growers from 21 December 1959. Parshina was mentored by the farm's director Ivan Sergeevich Shinkarev, and came into a greenhouse economy that was small and had to gain the skills to grow seedlings and vegetables during the era of rapidly growing production. Her team gave to the state five million seedlings and 900 t (990 tons) of early vegetable products during a period of five years when the farm grew on the site of greenhouses. Parshina and her team worked with scientists from the Institute of Plant Industry, the Agricultural Academy and the K. A. Timiryazev following which a school teaching students teams by vegetable growers and introduced children to agricultural technology basics was established on the basis of the brigade, which, in turn, was adopted by all specialised farms in the Soviet Union. It became a Soviet leader in the production of a wide range of vegetables and removed more than 30 kg (66 lb) of cucumbers per square meter from the greenhouse if her team received 10–12 kg (22–26 lb). Parshina's team became self-sufficient with more than 100 people working. She retired in 2001.

In 1965, Parshina became a member of the Communist Party of the Soviet Union. She was frequently elected to serve as a deputy on the Tyarlevsky village and Pushkin district Councils of People's Deputies and was a member of the bureau of the Leningrad Regional Committee of the Communist Party of the Soviet Union. From 1979 to 1989, Parshina was an elected deputy of the 10th and 11th convocations of the Supreme Soviet of the Soviet Union, and was a delegate to the 25th, 26th, 27th and the 28th of the Congress of the Communist Party of the Soviet Union held from 1976 to 1990. She was a candidate member of the Central Committee of the Communist Party of the Soviet Union between 1981 and 1989 before serving as an elected member of the Central Committee from 1989 to 1990. Parshina worked as a member of the Committee of Heroes of Socialist Labor and full holders of the Order of Labor Glory and had an active role in the public life of the Tosnensky district.

== Personal life ==
She died on 21 December 2020.

== Honours ==
Parshina was awarded the Order of the Red Banner of Labour on 4 August 1971 and twice earned the Order of Lenin on 12 November 1973 on 24 February 1978 with the title of Hero of Socialist Labour and the "Hammer and Sickle" gold medal " for the outstanding successes achieved in the All-Union Socialist Competition, the labor prowess shown in the fulfillment of plans and socialist obligations to increase the production and sale of agricultural products to the state in 1977." She was conferred the Order of the October Revolution on 16 March 1987. In 2002, Parshina was made an honorary citizen of the Leningrad region. She was honored with a televised congratulations from television channel Len TV 24 in March 2012.
