= Georgy Razumovsky =

Soviet politician

- Георгий Разумовский

Chairman of the Commission on Party Building and Cadre Work of the Central Committee
- In office 30 September 1988 – 14 July 1990
- Preceded by: Post established
- Succeeded by: Yuri Manaenkov

Head of the Party Building and Cadre Work Department of the Central Committee
- In office 23 April 1985 – 14 July 1990
- Preceded by: Yegor Ligachyov
- Succeeded by: Yuri Manaenkov

First Secretary of the Krasnodar Regional Committee
- In office 27 June 1983 – 3 June 1985
- Preceded by: Vitaly Vorotnikov
- Succeeded by: Ivan Polozkov

Candidate member of the 27th Politburo
- In office 18 February 1988 – 13 July 1990

Member of the 27th Secretariat
- In office 6 March 1986 – 14 July 1990

Full member of the 27th Central Committee
- In office 6 March 1986 – 14 July 1990

Personal details
- Born: Georgy Petrovich Razumovsky; 19 January 1936 (age 90) Krasnodar, Russian SFSR, Soviet Union
- Party: Communist Party of the Soviet Union

Georgy Petrovich Razumovsky (Russian: Гео́ргий Петро́вич Разумо́вский;) born 19 January 1936) is a Soviet politician who was a high-ranking official in the Communist Party of the Soviet Union (CPSU). He was a protégé of Mikhail Gorbachev, serving as Chairman of the Party Building and Cadre Work Commission and Head of the Party Building and Cadre Work.
