= Politburo of the 27th Congress of the Communist Party of the Soviet Union =

27th Politburo
- 26th Politburo ← → 28th Politburo
- Duration: 6 March 1986 – 14 July 1990

The Politburo of the 27th Congress of the Communist Party of the Soviet Union was in session from 1986 to 1990.

== Composition ==
=== Members ===
Members of the Political Bureau of the 27th Congress of the Communist Party of the Soviet Union
Name	Cyrillic	26th POL	28th POL	Birth	Death	PM	Ethnicity	Gender	Portrait
Heydar Aliyev	Гейда́р Али́ев	Old	Relieved	1923	2003	1945	Azerbaijani	Male	
Viktor Chebrikov	Виктор Че́бриков	Old	Relieved	1923	1999	1950	Ukrainian	Male	
Mikhail Gorbachev	Михаил Горбачёв	Old	Reelected	1931	2022	1952	Russian	Male	
Andrei Gromyko	Андрей Громыко	Old	Relieved	1909	1989	1931	Belarusian	Male	
Vladimir Ivashko	Владимир Ивашко	By-election	Reelected	1932	1994	1960	Ukrainian	Male	
Vladimir Kryuchkov	Владимир Крючков	Promoted	Not	1924	2007	1944	Russian	Male	
Dinmukhamed Kunaev	Дінмұхаммед Қонаев	Old	Relieved	1912	1993	1939	Kazakh	Male	
Yegor Ligachev	Егор Лигачёв	Old	Not	1920	2021	1944	Russian	Male	
Yuri Maslyukov	Юрий Маслюков	Promoted	Not	1937	2010	1966	Russian	Male	
Vadim Medvedev	Вадим Медведев	By-election	Not	1929	2025	1952	Russian	Male	
Viktor Nikonov	Виктор Никонов	By-election	Relieved	1929	1993	1954	Russian	Male	
Nikolai Ryzhkov	Николай Рыжков	Old	Not	1929	2024	1956	Russian	Male	
Volodymyr Shcherbytsky	Влади́мир Щерби́цкий	Old	Relieved	1918	1990	1948	Ukrainian	Male	
Eduard Shevardnadze	Эдуард Шеварднадзе	Old	Not	1928	2014	1936	Georgian	Male	
Nikolay Slyunkov	Никола́й Слюнько́в	Promoted	Not	1929	2022	1954	Belarusian	Male	
Mikhail Solomentsev	Михаи́л Соло́менцев	Old	Relieved	1913	2008	1940	Russian	Male	
Vitaly Vorotnikov	Вита́лий Воротнико́в	Old	Not	1926	2012	1950	Russian	Male	
Alexander Yakovlev	Алекса́ндр Я́ковлев	By-election	Not	1923	2005	1944	Russian	Male	
Lev Zaykov	Лев Зайков	New	Not	1923	2002	1957	Russian	Male	

=== Candidates ===
Candidate Members of the Political Bureau of the 27th Congress of the Communist Party of the Soviet Union
Name	Cyrillic	26th POL	28th POL	Birth	Death	PM	Ethnicity	Gender	Portrait
Aleksandra Biryukova	Александра Бирюкова	By-election	Not	1929	2008	1956	Russian	Female	
Pyotr Demichev	Пётр Де́мичев	Candidate	Relieved	1917	2010	1939	Russian	Male	
Vladimir Dolgikh	Владимир Долгих	Candidate	Relieved	1924	2020	1942	Russian	Male	
Anatoly Lukyanov	Анатолий Лукьянов	By-election	Not	1930	2019	1953	Russian	Male	
Yuri Maslyukov	Юрий Маслюков	By-election	Promoted	1937	2010	1966	Russian	Male	
Yevgeny Primakov	Евгений Примаков	By-election	Not	1929	2015	1959	Russian	Male	
Boris Pugo	Борис Пуго	By-election	Not	1937	1991	1963	Latvian	Male	
Georgy Razumovsky	Гео́ргий Разумо́вский	By-election	Not	1936	Alive	1961	Russian	Male	
Nikolay Slyunkov	Никола́й Слюнько́в	New	Promoted	1929	2022	1954	Belarusian	Male	
Sergey Sokolov	Серге́й Соколо́в	Candidate	Relieved	1911	2012	1937	Russian	Male	
Yuri Solovyev	Юрий Соловьёв	New	Relieved	1925	2011	1955	Russian	Male	
Nikolai Talyzin	Никола́й Талы́зин	Candidate	Relieved	1929	1991	1960	Russian	Male	
Aleksandr Vlasov	Александр Власов	By-election	Not	1932	2002	1956	Russian	Male	
Dmitry Yazov	Дми́трий Я́зов	By-election	Not	1924	2020	1944	Russian	Male	
Boris Yeltsin	Борис Ельцин	Candidate	Relieved	1931	2007	1961	Russian	Male	

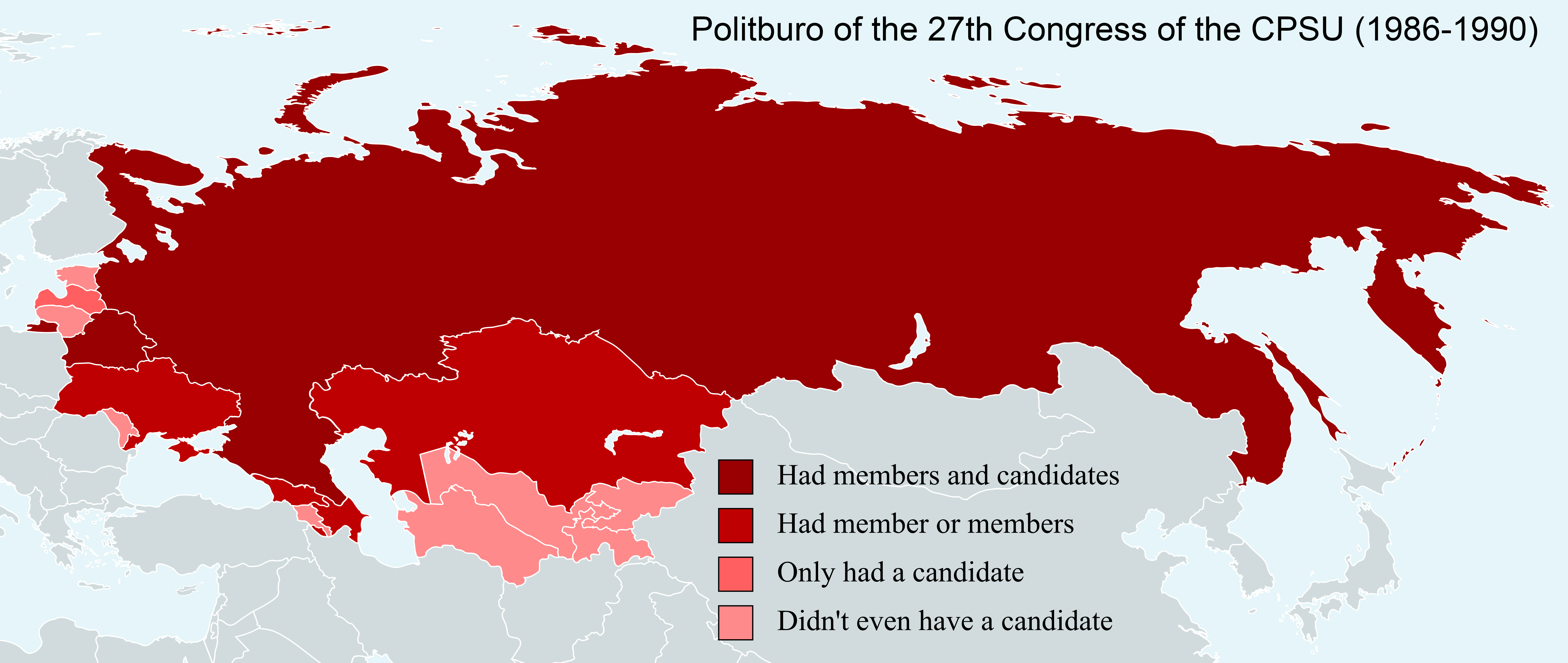
