= Yuri Maslyukov =

Russian politician (1937–2010)

Yury Maslyukov
- Юрий Маслюков
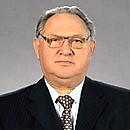

Member of the Committee on Budget Issues and Taxes
- In office 28 June 1996 – 1 April 2010

Minister of Industry and Commerce
- In office 1998–1999

First Deputy Prime Minister of the Russian Federation
- In office 11 September 1998 – 25 May 1999
- Preceded by: Sergey Kiriyenko
- Succeeded by: Vadim Gustov

Chairman of the State Planning Committee of the Soviet Union
- In office 1988–1991
- Preceded by: Nikolai Talyzin

Full member of the 27th Politburo
- In office 20 September 1989 – 14 July 1990

Candidate member of the 27th Politburo
- In office 18 February 1988 – 20 September 1989

Full member of the 27th, 28th Central Committee
- In office 6 March 1986 – 29 August 1991

Personal details
- Born: Yury Dmitriyevich Maslyukov; 30 September 1937 Leninabad, Tajik SSR, Soviet Union
- Died: 1 April 2010 (aged 72) Moscow, Russia
- Party: Communist Party of the Soviet Union (first); Communist Party of the Russian Federation (later)

Yury Dmitriyevich Maslyukov (Note: Russian: Юрий Дмитриевич Маслюков, romanized: Jurij Dimitrijevič Masljukov) (30 September 1937 – 1 April 2010) was a Soviet and Russian politician who was in charge of the Gosplan for three years preceding the demise of the Soviet Union and first deputy prime minister in 1998–1999.

== Early life ==
Yuri Maslyukov was born on 30 September 1937 in the Leninabad in Tajik SSR. He graduated from the Leningrad Mechanical Institute.

== Political career ==
Maslyukov served several positions within both the Soviet Union and the Russian Federation. Within the CPSU, he was candidate member of the Central Committee's Politburo in 1988-1989 and full member from September 20, 1989 to July 14, 1990. Prior to the collapse of the Soviet Union, he held several high-ranking positions with the CPSU, including the post of First Deputy Defense Industry Minister of the Soviet Union. After the dissolution of the Soviet Union he joined the Communist Party of the Russian Federation (CPRF).

Maslyukov was the only Communist member of the Russian Cabinet under Boris Yeltsin, serving as First Deputy Prime Minister of Russia at the Yevgeny Primakov's Cabinet in the wake of the 1998 Russian financial crisis. He ultimately served as a member of the Committee on Budget Issues and Taxes of the State Duma, until his death on 1 April 2010.

== Decorations and awards ==
- Order of Lenin (1987)
- Order of the October Revolution
- Order of the Red Banner of Labour
- Order of the Badge of Honour
- Diploma of the Government of the Russian Federation
  - (1997) - for services to the state and many years of hard work
  - (1999) - for services to the state and many years of hard work
  - (2002) - for long-term productive state activities
- Gratitude of the Government of the Russian Federation (2007) - for long-term and fruitful state activities

== See also ==
- List of members of the State Duma of Russia who died in office
