= Yuri Sklyarov =

Soviet politician (1925–2013)

Yuri Aleksandrovich Sklyarov (Russian: Юрий Александрович Скляров, 8 February 1925, Kursk – 3 August 2013, Moscow) was a Soviet politician, Candidate of Historical Sciences, a CPSU member since 1944, a candidate member of the Central Committee (1981-1989), Deputy of the Supreme Soviet of the USSR 11 convocation. From July 1986 to November 1988, he was the head of the Propaganda Department of the Central Committee of the CPSU.
