= International Department of the Communist Party of the Soviet Union =

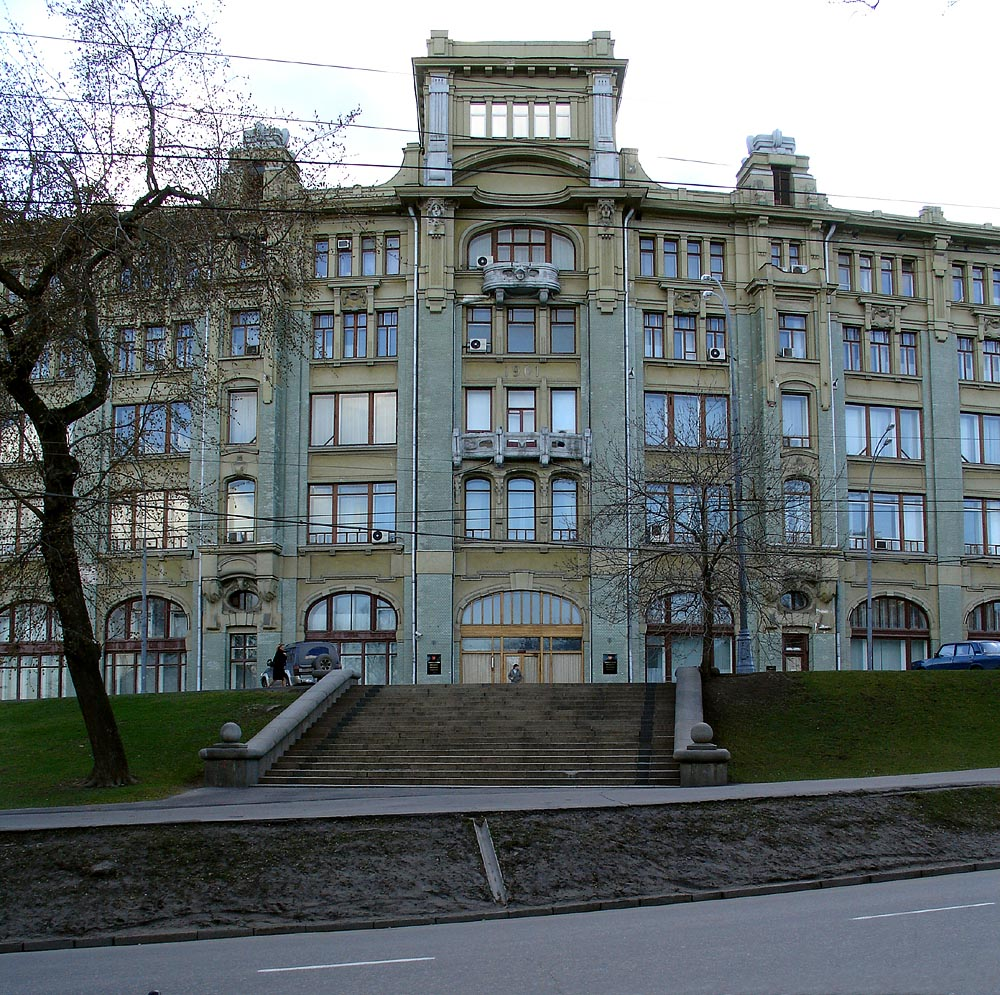
Former building of the Foreign Department of the Central Committee of the CPSU at 8 Old Square, previously the "Boyarsky Dvor" hotel, now the seat of the Presidential Administration of Russia

The International Department of the Central Committee of the Communist Party of the Soviet Union was a department of the Central Committee of the Communist Party of the Soviet Union that oversaw the Party's relationships with foreign Communist Parties as well as with international communist front organizations.

== History ==
It inherited the files and some of the personnel of the Communist International, which disbanded in 1943. The International Department was founded in 1943 at roughly the same time as the Comintern's dissolution.

The Party's relations with international front groups was managed by the Department's International Social Organizations Sector.

== Leadership ==
- 1943, 27 December – 1945, 29 December: Georgi Dimitrov
- 1946, 13 April – 1949, 12 March: Mikhail Suslov
- 1949 – 1953: Vagan Grigoryan
- 1953 – 1954: Mikhail Suslov
- 1954 – 1955: Vasily Stepanov
- 1955 – 1986: Boris Ponomarev (the first deputy director from 1938 to 1955, deputy director of the Cominform from 1947 to 1948)
- 1986 – 1988: Anatoly Dobrynin
- 1988 – 1991: Valentin Falin

== See also ==
- Departments of the Communist Party of the Soviet Union
- International Department of the Chinese Communist Party
- International Relations Department of the Central Committee of the SED
