= Mikalay Slyonkow =

Belarusian politician (1929–2022)

Mіkalay Slyonkow
- Мікалай Слюнькоў

First Secretary of the Communist Party of Byelorussia
- In office 13 January 1983 – 6 February 1987
- Head of state: Ivan Paliakoŭ; Georgy Tarazevich
- Head of government: Aleksandr Aksyonov; Vladimir Brovikov; Mikhail Kovalev
- Preceded by: Tikhon Kiselyov; Vladimir Brovikov (acting)
- Succeeded by: Yefrem Sokolov

Chairman of the Socio-Economic Policy Commission of the Central Committee
- In office 30 September 1988 – 14 July 1990
- Preceded by: Established
- Succeeded by: Abolished

Head of the Economic Department of the Central Committee
- In office 1987 – 30 September 1988
- Preceded by: Boris Gostev
- Succeeded by: Vladimir Shimko

Candidate member of the 27th Politburo
- In office 6 March 1986 – 26 June 1987

Member of the 27th Secretariat
- In office 28 January 1987 – 14 July 1990

Full member of the 27th Central Committee
- In office 6 March 1986 – 14 July 1990

Full member of the 27th Politburo
- In office 26 June 1987 – 1990

Personal details
- Born: 26 April 1929 Gorodets, Rahachow district, Byelorussian SSR, USSR
- Died: 9 August 2022 (aged 93) Minsk, Belarus
- Party: Communist Party of the Soviet Union (1954–1990)

Mіkalay Mіkіtavіch Slyonkow (Belarusian: Мікалай Мікітавіч Слюнькоў; Russian: Никола́й Ники́тович Слюнько́в, romanized: Nikolay Nikitovich Slyunkov; 26 April 1929 – 9 August 2022) was a Belarusian politician who was first secretary of the Communist Party of the Byelorussian SSR from 13 January 1983 to 6 February 1987 during the Soviet Union.

Slyunkov became a full member of the 27th Politburo on 26 June 1987, where he remained until its abolition in 1990.
