= Valentin Falin =

Soviet diplomat and politician

- Baлeнтин Фaлин
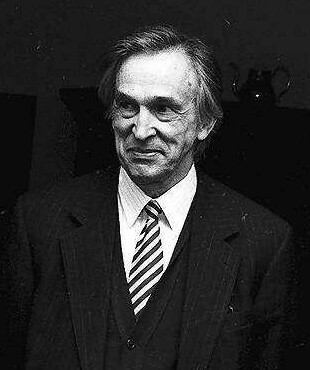
- Falin in 1992

Head of the International Department of the Central Committee
- In office 30 September 1988 – 29 August 1991
- Preceded by: Anatoly Dobrynin
- Succeeded by: Post abolished

Secretary of the 28th Central Committee
- In office 14 July 1990 – 29 August 1991

Full member of the 27th, 28th Central Committee
- In office 25 April 1989 – 29 August 1991

Candidate member of the 27th Central Committee
- In office 6 March 1986 – 25 April 1989

Personal details
- Born: Valentin Mikhailovich Falin; 3 April 1926 Leningrad, Russian SFSR, Soviet Union
- Died: 22 February 2018 (aged 91) Moscow, Russia
- Party: Communist Party of the Soviet Union (1951–1991)
- Education: MGIMO
- Awards: Order of the October Revolution, Order of the Red Banner of Labour, Order of Friendship of Peoples, USSR State Prize

Valentin Mikhailovich Falin (Russian: Валентин Михайлович Фалин; 3 April 1926 – 22 February 2018) was a Soviet diplomat and politician.

== Early life ==
Falin was born in Leningrad. He graduated from the Moscow State Institute of International Relations in 1950.

== Career ==
From 1951 to 1958, he worked at the USSR Foreign Ministry. From 1971 to 1978, he was the Ambassador of the USSR to the Federal Republic of Germany. In 1978, he was appointed First Deputy Chief of the International Information Department of the Central Committee of the CPSU, a post he left in January 1983 for personal reasons. From 1982 to 1986 he was a political observer, then editor and chief editor in the newspaper Izvestia.

On 10 March 1986 Falin was elected by the Council of Sponsors of the Novosti Press Agency to the position of chairman of the APN board. In 1988–1991 he was the Chief of the International Department of the Central Committee of the Communist Party of the Soviet Union. While Falin headed the International Department, its special section for Party Technology, which was located in Room 516, was headed by an alleged specialist in black operations the komitetchik (Russian: комитетчик) Vladimir Osintsev (Russian: Владимир Осинцев) who allegedly supported active measures for Communist Party influence campaigns in countries in which the Communist Party was banned including Chile, El Salvador, South Africa and Turkey. (Note: Felipe Turover Chudínov, who is a former senior officer in the foreign intelligence directorate of the KGB and his father Genrikh Yakovlevich Turover was a translator to Leonid Brezhnev, worked closely with the Party Technology division of the International Department and allegedly was responsible for financial schemes supporting Soviet friendly firms through the Lugano based Swiss bank Banco del Gottardo, which had been the overseas branch of Banco Ambrosiano, for clandestine equipment transfers to the Soviet Union. The Zurich branch of the Banco del Gottardo or Gotthard-Bank or Banca del Gottardo was also used. Giulio Andreotti was a friend of Felipe Turover's father Genrikh Yakovlevich Turover (also transliterated as Heinrich Thurover) (Russian: Генрих Яковлевич Туровер; born 7 May 1931) who, in 1962, founded and headed the Romance language department at Moscow State Linguistic University, was known as interprète chevronné, taught languages at the KGB Red Banner Academy, authored Spanish-Russian dictionaries and textbooks and, during the Soviet period, was a Spanish and French translation expert for the USSR as an interpreter at the most important negotiations for Soviet leaders.) In August 1991, Falin allegedly ordered the desturuction of the files in the International Department. Following the failed 1991 coup against Mikhail Gorbachev, he left government service.

From 1992 to 2000, he worked at Institute for Peace Research and Security Policy of Hamburg University (Institut für Friedensforschung und Sicherheitspolitik an der Universität Hamburg) in Germany. He returned to Russia in 2000 and lived in Moscow.

== Bibliography ==
- Die letzte Nuklearexplosion. Изд-во АПН, Москва, 1986. — 309 стр.
- Helden. München: Psychosozial-Verlag-Union, 1987. — 159 S.
- Ziele und Voraussetzungen eines geeinten Europas Vorstellung des Projektes Strategien und Optionen für die Zukunft Europas. Gütersloh: Verlag Bertelsmann-Stiftung, 1988. — 39 S.
- Politische Erinnerungen. München: Verlag Droemer Knaur, 1993—518 S.
- Zweite Front. Die Interessenkonflikte in der Anti-Hitler-Koalition. München: Verlag Droemer Knaur, 1995.
- Konflikte im Kreml. München: Blessing, 1997. — 317 S.
- Alexander Kluge. Valentin Falin. — Rotbuch Verlag, 1995. ISBN 9783880228177
