= Gennady Ulanov =

Soviet politician (1929–2018)

- Gennady Ulanov in 1989
- Born: 7 November 1929; Fedotovo, Gorky Oblast, Russian SFSR, Soviet Union
- Died: September 23, 2018 (aged 88); Kaluga, Russia

Gennady Ivanovich Ulanov (Russian: Генна́дий Ива́нович Ула́нов; 7 November 1929 – 23 September 2018) was a Soviet politician and party leader in 1983 / 1990 first secretary of the Kaluga Regional Committee of Communist Party of the Soviet Union.

He was a delegate XXIII, XXVI and XXVII CPSU Congress.

In March 1989, he participated in the elections of People's Deputies of the USSR on a competitive basis and was not elected.

In January 1990, he announced his candidacy for the elections of People's Deputies of the RSFSR. But then, having learned from opinion polls that his chances of winning are slim, he refused to participate, and filed for retirement. At the same time, the period of his leadership of the Kaluga region is considered one of the most prosperous in history of region.

In 1992 — 2004 he worked as deputy head, chief inspector of the Department of Federal State Employment Service of the Kaluga Oblast.

He lived in Kaluga.
