= Vladimir Karpov =

Russian-Soviet writer and soldier (1922–2010)

- Владимир Васильевич Карпов
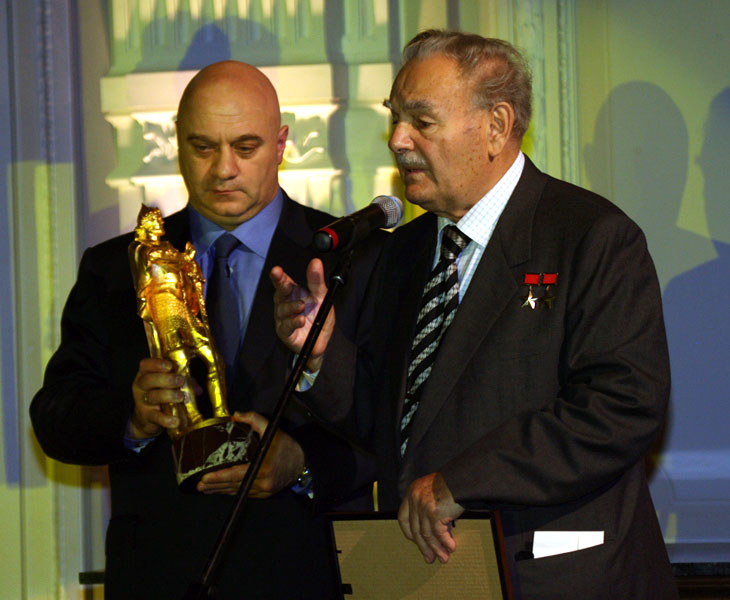

Member of the Soviet of Nationalities
- In office 1984–1989

Personal details
- Born: 28 July 1922 Orenburg, Russian SFSR
- Died: 18 January 2010 (aged 87) Moscow, Russia
- Resting place: Troyekurovskoye Cemetery
- Party: CPSU
- Education: Frunze Military Academy
- Known for: writer and editor of Novy Mir magazine
- Awards: Hero of the Soviet Union; USSR State Prize

Military service
- Branch/service: Red Army
- Years of service: 1939–1966
- Rank: Colonel
- Battles/wars: Great Patriotic War

Vladimir Vasilyevich Karpov (Russian: Владимир Васильевич Карпов; 28 July 1922 – 18 January 2010) was a Soviet soldier, writer of historical novels and public figure. He was awarded the Hero of the Soviet Union for bravery in World War II.

Karpov was born in Orenburg, and moved to Tashkent as a child. He graduated from the Tashkent Military academy in 1941 when he was also the middleweight boxing champion of Uzbekistan. He was repressed in 1941 and transferred to a punishment battalion on the Kalinin Front in 1942. He was rehabilitated due to bravery in the face of the enemy in 1943 and promoted to lieutenant. He was awarded the Hero of the Soviet Union in 1944 for capturing 79 prisoners.

After the war, Karpov attended the Frunze Military Academy (1947) and served in Central Asia, retiring as a regimental commander and chief of staff of a division in 1966.

Karpov started writing in 1945 and graduated from the Maxim Gorky Literature Institute via a correspondence course in 1954. From 1947 to 1954 he worked in GRU. From 1966 he was editor of the magazine Oktyabr in Uzbekistan and became editor of the magazine Novy Mir between 1981 and 1986. From 1986 to 1991, he was first secretary of the Union of Soviet Writers.

Fragments of an interview with Karpov was used in the controversial documentary film The Soviet Story.

Karpov died in Moscow and is buried in Troyekurovskoye Cemetery.

== Awards ==
- Hero of the Soviet Union
- USSR State Prize
- Order of Lenin (2)
- Order of the October Revolution
- Order of the Red Banner
- Order of the Patriotic War 1st class
- Order of the Red Star (2)
- Medal "For Courage"
- Medal "For Battle Merit"
- Order of the Red Banner of Labour
- campaign and jubilee medals

== Bibliography ==
In English

- The Commander, Brassey's Inc, 1987
- Russia at War, Vendome Press, 1987 (introduction by Karpov)
- Маршальский жезл ("Marshal's Baton" 1970)
- Взять живым! ("Take Him Alive" 1974), a novel
- Не мечом единым ("Not by Sword Alone" 1979), a novel
- Полководец ("Commander" 1984) – documentary about General Ivan Yefimovich Petrov
- Маршал Жуков, его соратники и противники в годы войны и мира», memoirs of Marshal Georgy Zhukov in two volumes, (1989);
- Маршал Жуков. Опала (1994)
- Расстрелянные маршалы ("Executed Marshals" 1999)
- Генералиссимус», в 2 томах ("Generalissimo" 2002) – a biography of Joseph Stalin
- Маршал Баграмян "Мы много пережили в тиши после войны" (2006) memoirs of Ivan Bagramyan
