= Alexander Melnikov (politician) =

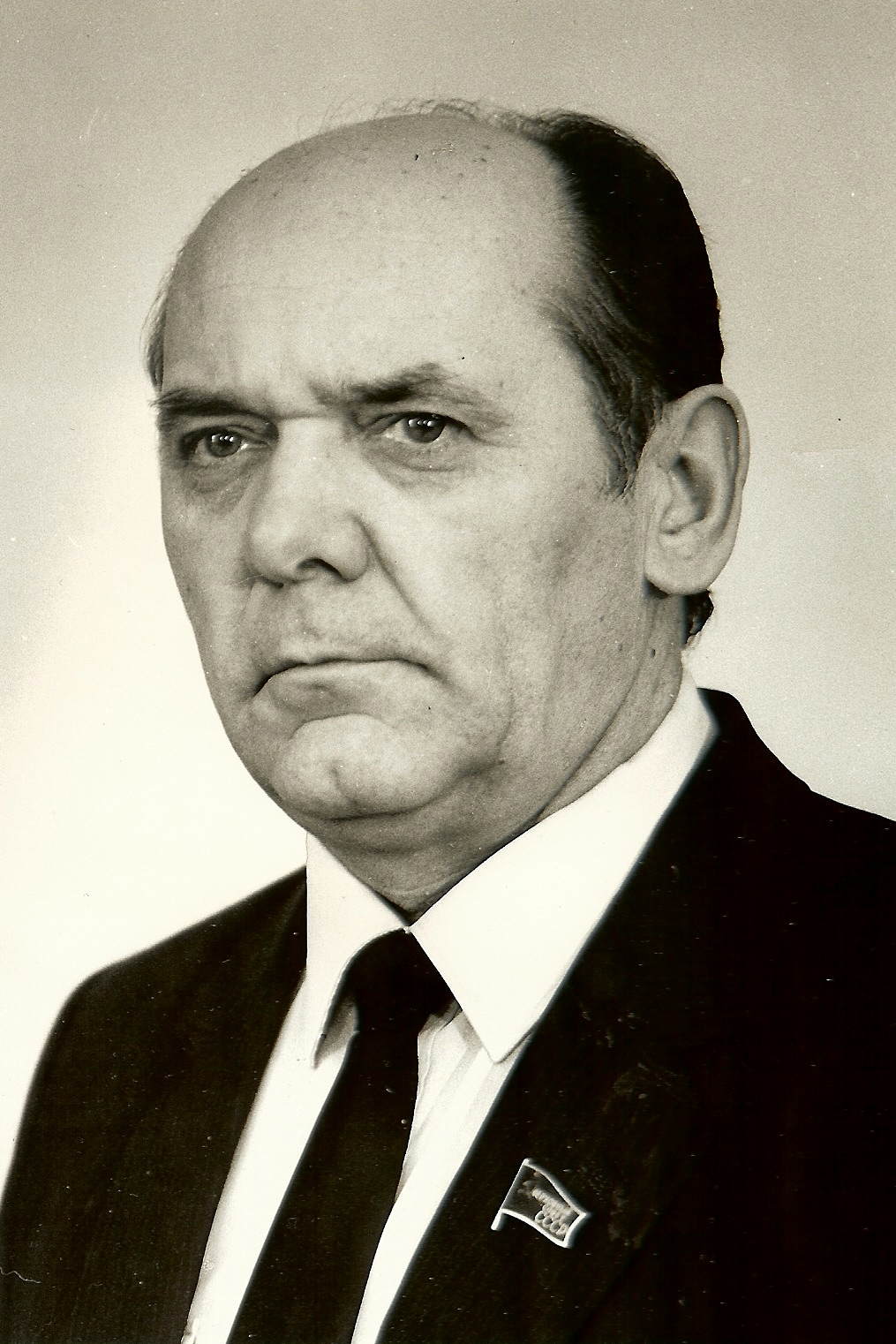

First Secretary of the Kemerovo Regional Committee
- In office 17 November 1988 – 22 September 1990
- Preceded by: Vadim Bakatin
- Succeeded by: Anatoly Zaitsev

Head of the Construction Department of the Central Committee
- In office 1985 – 30 September 1988
- Preceded by: Boris Yeltsin
- Succeeded by: Post abolished

First Secretary of the Tomsk Regional Committee
- In office 29 April 1983 – 31 January 1986
- Preceded by: Yegor Ligachyov
- Succeeded by: Viktor Zorkaltsev

Full member of the 27th Central Committee
- In office 6 March 1986 – 14 July 1990

Personal details
- Born: Alexander Grigoryevich Melnikov; 20 October 1930 Orekhovo-Zuyevo, Moscow Oblast, RSFSR, Soviet Union
- Died: 25 December 2011 (aged 81) Moscow, Russia
- Party: Communist Party of the Soviet Union (1957–1991); Communist Party of the Russian Federation (1993–2011)

Alexander Grigoryevich Melnikov (Russian: Александр Григорьевич Мельников; 20 October 1930 – 25 December 2011) was a Soviet and post-Soviet Russian politician; Communist Party high-ranking official in 1986–1991; the First Secretary (mayor) of Siberian town of Seversk, the First Secretary (governor) of Tomsk (1983–1986), and Kemerovo regions. In 1990–2000's – head of CIS Ministry Managing department, advisor of the Union State Secretary. One of the leaders of the Communist Party of the Russian Federation.

== Biography ==
In 1953 after graduating from Moscow State University of Civil Engineering at the age of 23 began his career in Siberia where he started working as an engineer on Sovien Nuclear project near Tomsk (firstly the object was called "Post box number 5", later becoming Tomsk-7 town, the future Seversk town). In 1953–1955 was the supervising engineer of Siberian Chemical Plant.

In 1957 got second higher education in University of Marxism–Leninism, later the same year joined the Communist Party.

In 1959–1963 worked as an instructor and then chief of civil construction department in Tomsk-7. In 1963–1966 – chief of the executive committee of Tomsk-7. In 1965 graduated from Higher Party School. In 1966 was elected the First Secretary (mayor) of Tomsk-7.

From 1970 to 1983 – on recommendation of Yegor Ligachev worked as the chief of civil construction department of Tomsk Region, deputy secretary and then second secretary of Tomsk Region. (1973–1983). In April 1983 replaced the 'irreplaceable' Yegor Ligachev as the First Secretary (governor) of Tomsk Region.

Since January 1986 chief of the civil construction department in Central Committee of Communist Party in Moscow. In 1988–1990 he moved back to Siberia – worked as the First Secretary of Kemerovo Region, chief of the Kuznetsk Basin.

In 1990–1991 he worked in Moscow in Central Committee of Communist Party.

After the collapse of Soviet Union, he was one of the creators of the Communist Party of the Russian Federation, where he worked as a secretary of Communist Parties Council.

In 1991–1994 – CEO of civil construction company Monolitsroi. In 1996–1998 – on invitation of RF Minister Aman Tuleyev worked as a chief of Strategy Department in the Ministry of CIS Cooperation. In 2000–2002 – chief advisor of The Secretary of the Union State. Since 2002 – president of the International Association of Business Cooperation.

Holding the leading positions in Tomsk region, he made a significant contribution to construction of such towns as Tomsk, Seversk, Strezhevoy, Kedrovy, paid much attention to rural development, improvement of wood, oil, gas and nuclear industries as well as to public needs, thus he is warmly remembered in Tomsk and Kemerovo regions.

Was married, has two daughters, three granddaughters and one grandson.
