= Valery Boldin =

Soviet politician (1935–2006)

- Валерий Болдин
- Born: Valery Ivanovich Boldin; September 7, 1935; Tutayev, RSFSR, USSR
- Died: February 14, 2006 (aged 70); Moscow, Russia
- Resting place: Troyekurovskoye Cemetery
- Occupation: Political figure
- Political party: Communist Party of the Soviet Union (1960–1991)

Valery Ivanovich Boldin (Russian: Валерий Иванович Болдин; 1935 — 2006) was a Soviet party figure. He was a Member of the Central Committee of the Communist Party of the Soviet Union (1988 — 1991) and Deputy of the Supreme Soviet of the 11th convocation, People's Deputy of the USSR.

He also became a Candidate of Economic Sciences in 1969.

== Biography ==
He graduated from the Faculty of Economics of Russian State Agrarian University - Moscow Timiryazev Agricultural Academy (1956-1961).

He became a member of the CPSU since 1960. From 1961 until an unknown date he worked in the apparatus of the Central Committee of the CPSU. In 1969 he also graduated from the Academy of Social Sciences under the CPSU Central Committee.

In 1981-1987, he became Assistant Secretary to General Secretary of the CPSU Central Committee, Mikhail Gorbachev.

On March 23, 1990 he became a member of the Presidential Council of the USSR.

From April 17, 1990 to August 22, 1991, he was Chief of Staff of the President of the Soviet Union.

He actively participated in the events of August 1991 on the side of the State Committee on the State of Emergency.

On August 18, 1991, as part of a group of four people, including Baklanov, Varennikov and Shenin he flew to Gorbachev in Foros. At 6 pm their group flew back to Moscow.

On August 22, 1991, he was removed from office and arrested in the case of the State Emergency Committee. He was detained in the Matrosskaya Tishina detention center; in December 1991 he was released on recognizance not to leave the country. On May 6, 1994 the criminal case was terminated on the basis of the decree of the State Duma (On the Announcement of Political and Economic Amnesty).

He died in 2006. He was buried at the Troyekurovskoye Cemetery.
