= Vadim Medvedev =

Russian politician (1929–2025)

- Вадим Медведев
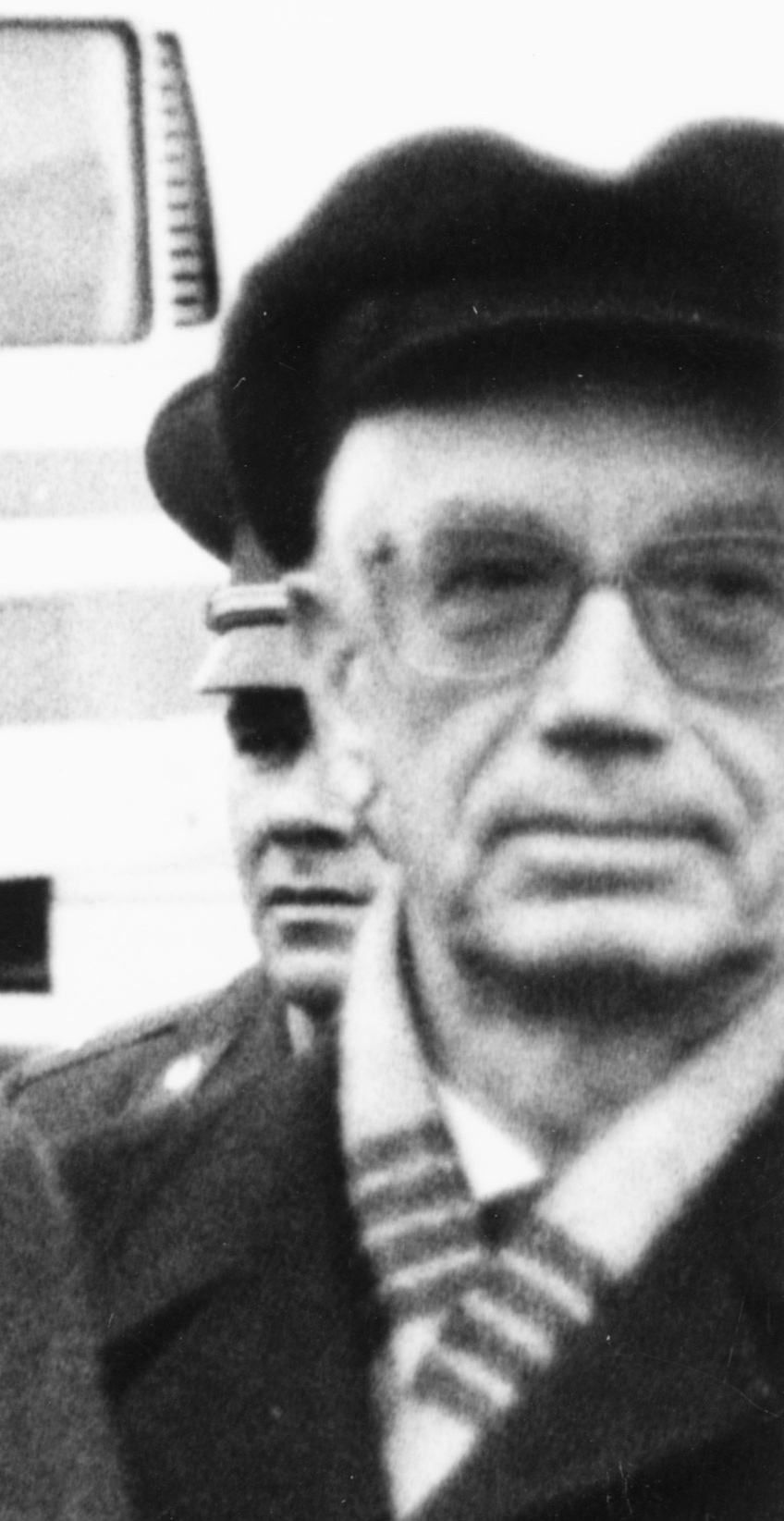
- Medvedev in 1990

Secretary of the Secretariat of the CPSU
- In office 6 March 1986 – 13 July 1990
- Preceded by: Yegor Ligachev
- Succeeded by: Vladimir Ivashko

Personal details
- Born: Vadim Andreevich Medvedev; 29 March 1929 Mokhonkovo, Yaroslavl Governorate, Russian SFSR, USSR
- Died: 11 July 2025 (aged 96) Moscow, Russia
- Party: CPSU
- Education: Leningrad State University (Doctor of Sciences)
- Occupation: Economist

Vadim Andreevich Medvedev (Russian: Вади́м Андре́евич Медве́дев; 29 March 1929 – 11 July 2025) was a Russian politician. A member of the Communist Party of the Soviet Union, he served as Secretary of the Secretariat of the CPSU from 1986 to 1990.

Medvedev died in Moscow on 11 July 2025, at the age of 96.
