= 26th Congress of the Communist Party of the Soviet Union =

1981 meeting of Soviet delegates

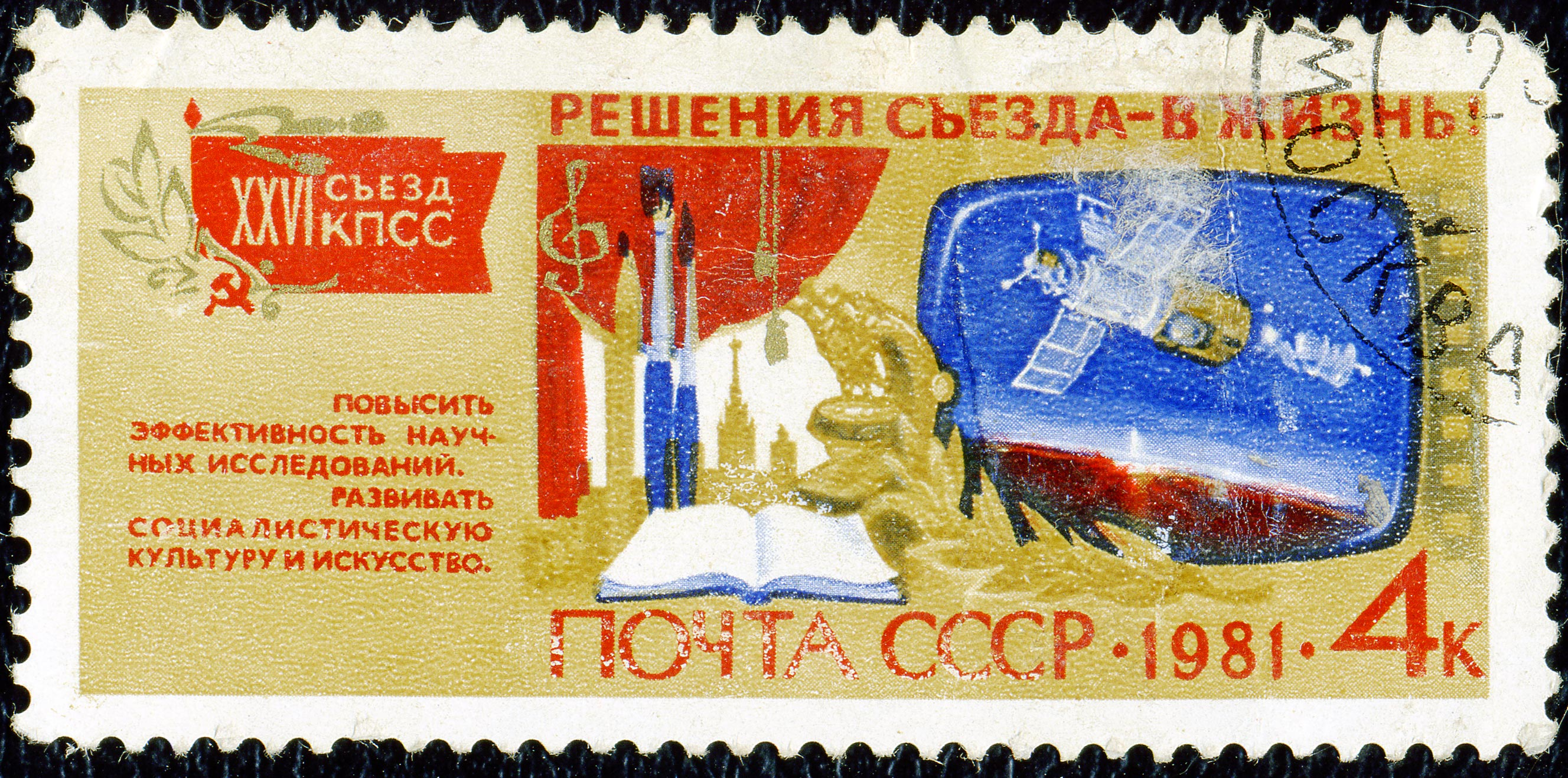
1981 USSR Postal Stamp, celebrating the 26th Congress

The 26th Congress of the Communist Party of the Soviet Union (26th Congress of the CPSU, Russian: XXVI съезд КПСС) opened on February 23, 1981, with a five-hour address by the General Secretary of the Communist Party and the chairman (president) of the Presidium of the Supreme Soviet Leonid Brezhnev. This was the last Congress for Brezhnev, who died in 1982. Brezhnev proposed another round of arms control talks. At a time when an aging Soviet leadership faced a decline in economic growth, severe food problems at home, grave uncertainties about its future relationship with the United States, and unsettling events in Poland, the congress ended its week of speeches by unanimously confirming the existing leadership. The congress elected the 26th Central Committee.

The 1st Plenary Session of the 26th Central Committee elected the 26th Politburo. The members of the 26th Politburo were all members of the 25th Politburo. The 14 voting members, whose average age was 69, and eight non-voting members (average age 65) were all reelected. None of the present members of the Politburo was a likely long term successor to General Secretary Brezhnev, who was 74. After ousting Nikita Khrushchev in 1964, Brezhnev did not repeat Khrushchev's mistake of placing a younger rival in a commanding position from which he could attain supreme power.
