= 1991 Soviet coup attempt =

Failed attempt to unseat Mikhail Gorbachev

1991 Soviet coup d'état attempt
- Part of the end of the Cold War, the Revolutions of 1989, and later, the dissolution of the Soviet Union
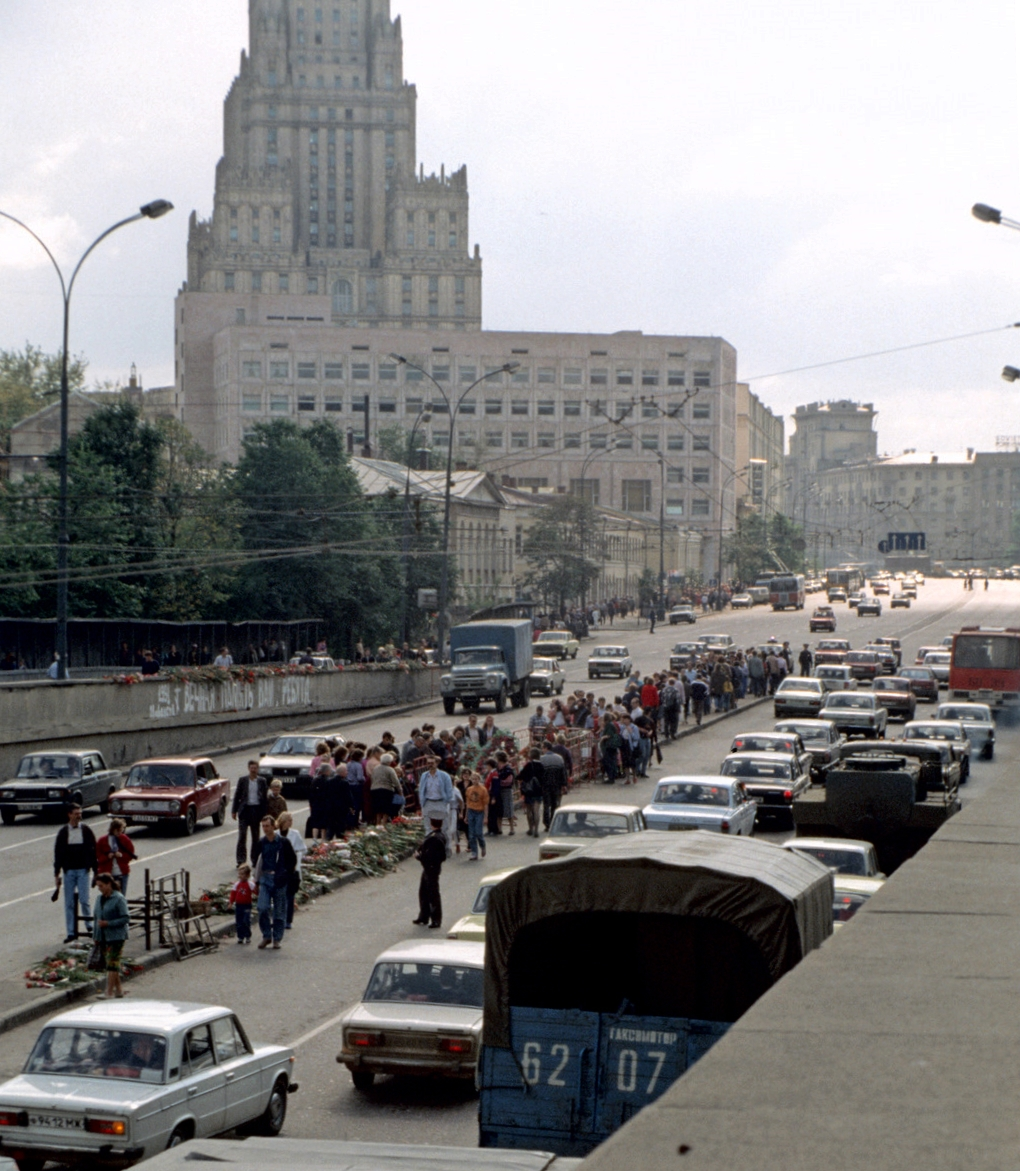
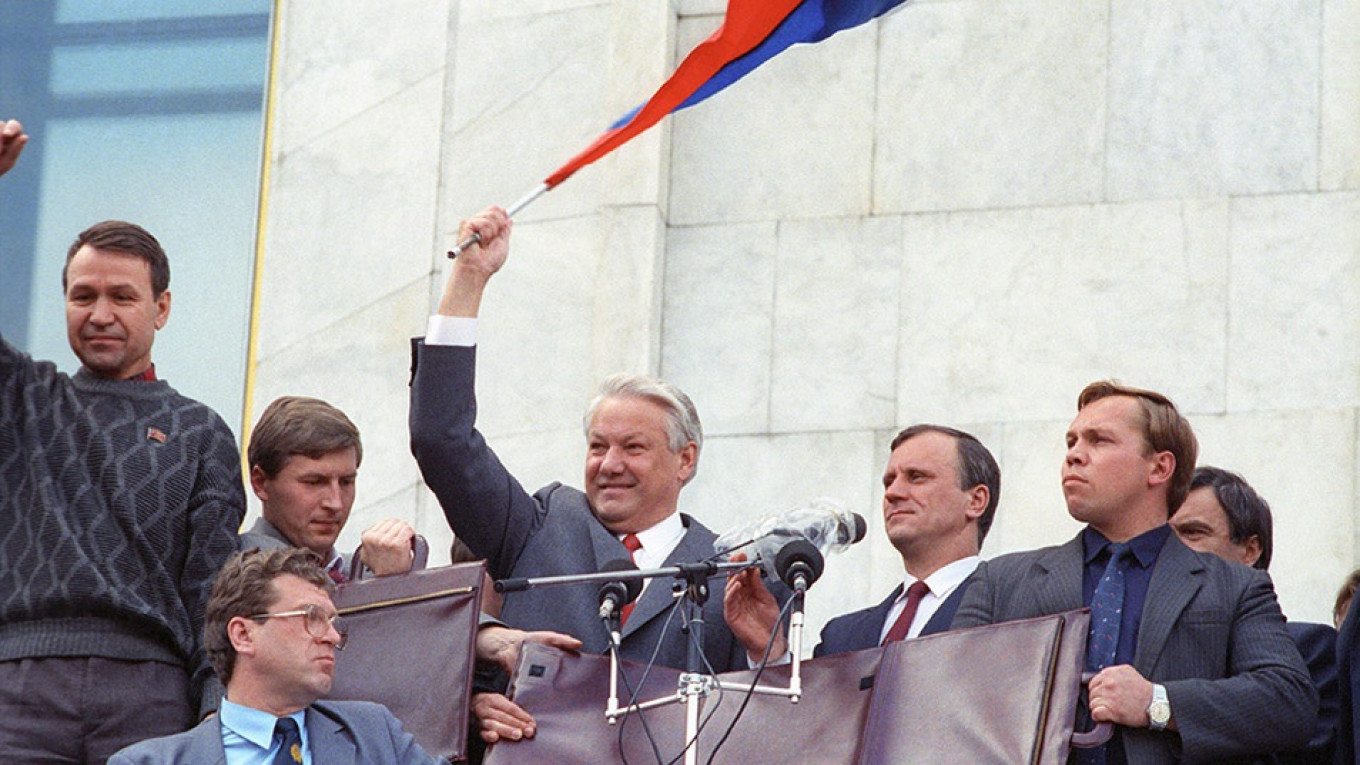
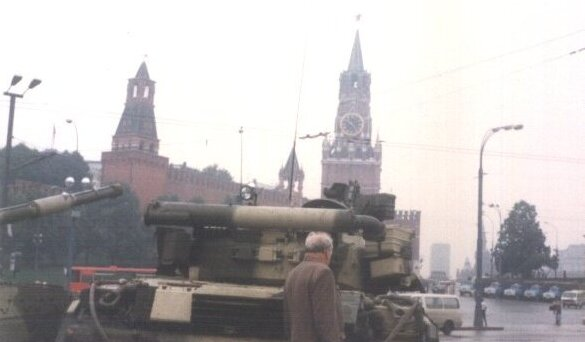
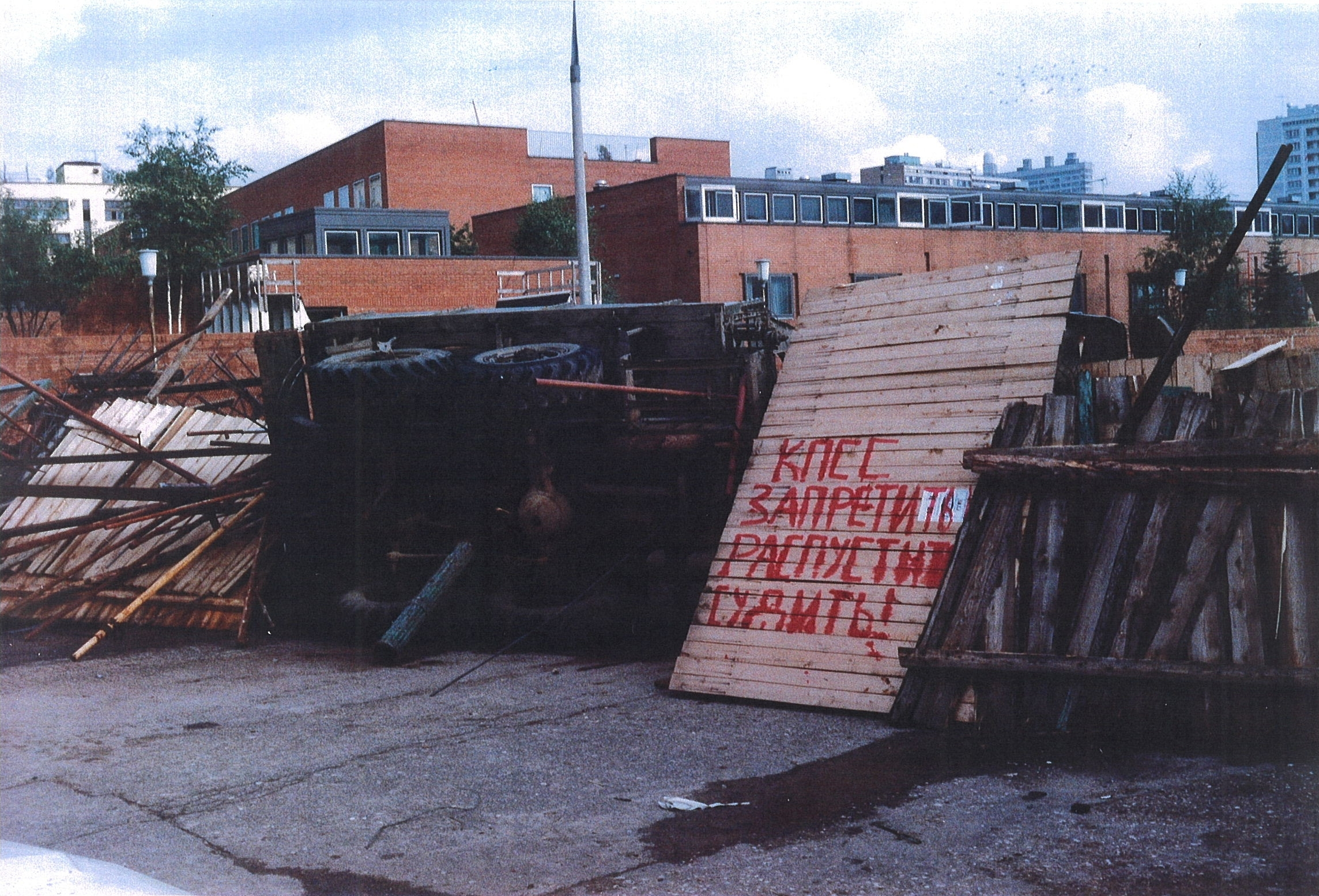
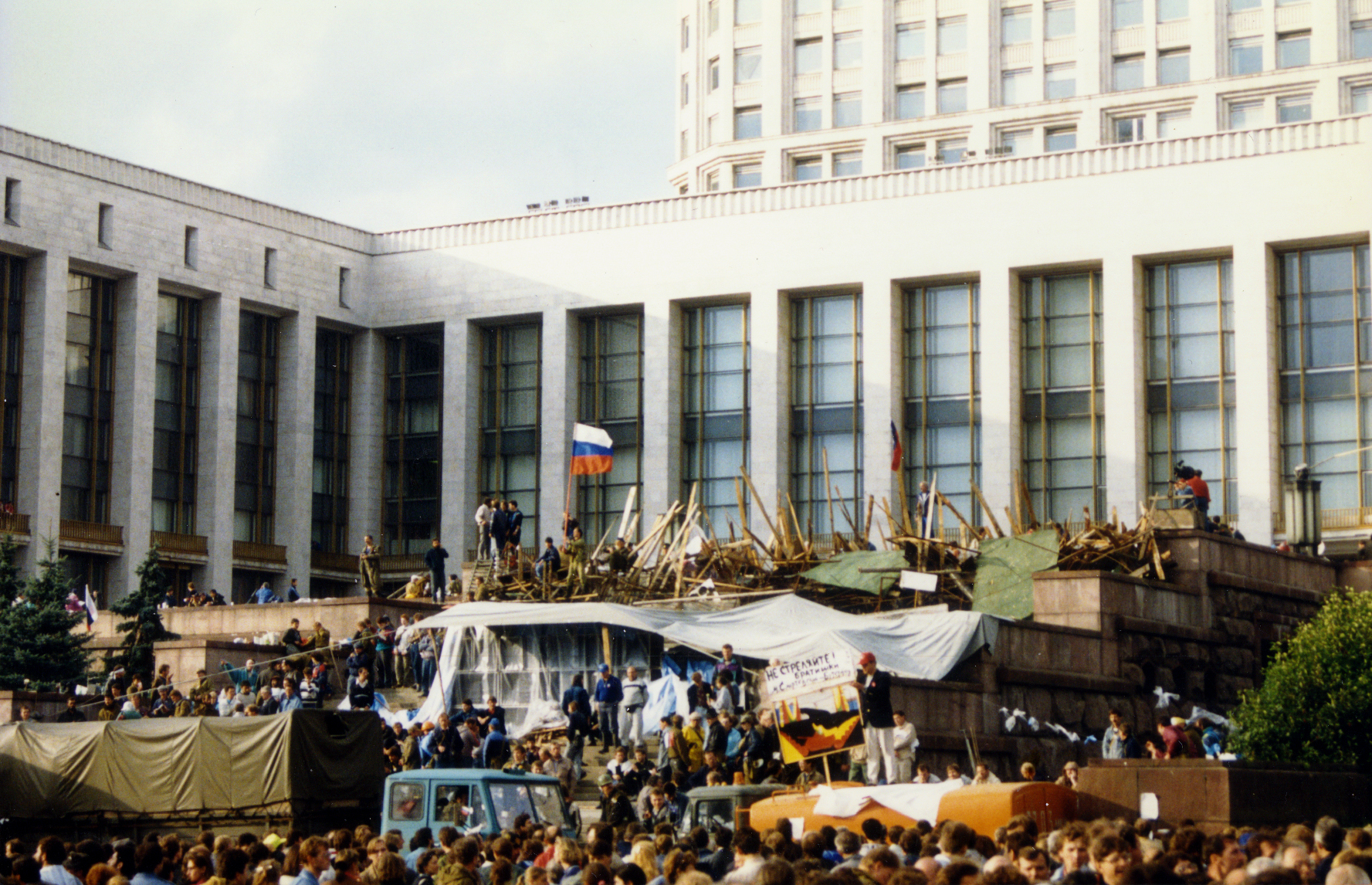
- Clockwise from top left: Memorial to three citizens killed defying the GKChP coup; Boris Yeltsin, the Russian president, waving the newly adopted national flag; Barricade on Smolenskaya Street that reads "Ban, dissolve, prosecute the CPSU!"; Pro-Yeltsin forces' barricades near Moscow's White House; GKChP tanks on the Bolshoy Moskvoretsky Bridge near Red Square
Date	18–22 August 1991 (5 days)
Location	Moscow, Russian SFSR, Soviet Union
Result	Presidential victory; coup fails; Self-dissolution of the GKChP; Failure of the proposed New Union Treaty; Dissolution of the Communist Party of the Soviet Union and seizure of its banks and buildings by the Russian SFSR; Restoration of Estonian and Latvian independence; Ukraine's declaration of independence; Belarus' declaration of independence; Chechen Revolution and Declaration of Sovereignty of the Chechen Republic; Power shift continued towards republic elites, Soviet president left with effectively no authority; Dissolution of the Soviet Union on 26 December 1991

Belligerents
(Soviet Union) State Committee on the State of Emergency; Taman Division; Kantemir Division; Communist Party of the Soviet Union; KGB; Alpha Group; Vympel Group	Presidency of the Soviet Union: Russian Soviet Federative Socialist Republic; Supreme Soviet; Congress of People's Deputies; Council of Ministers; Soviet Armed Forces
Supporting republics: Abkhazia; Azerbaijan; Byelorussia; Checheno-Ingushetia; Gagauzia; South Ossetia; Tajikistan; Tatarstan; Transnistria; Turkmenistan; Uzbekistan	Supporting republics: Armenia; Estonia; Georgia; Karakalpakstan; Kazakhstan; Kirghizia; Latvia; Lithuania; Moldova; Nakhchivan; Ukraine
Interfront: (Estonian Soviet Socialist Republic) Intermovement; (Latvian Soviet Socialist Republic) Interfront; (Lithuanian Soviet Socialist Republic) Yedinstvo; (Moldavian Soviet Socialist Republic) Unitate-Edinstvo; (Ukrainian Soviet Socialist Republic) International Movement of Donbass; (Russian Soviet Federative Socialist Republic) Communist Party of the RSFSR (Estonian Soviet Socialist Republic) Communist Party of Estonia (CPSU) (Latvian Soviet Socialist Republic) Communist Party of Latvia (Lithuanian Soviet Socialist Republic) Communist Party of Lithuania; Liberal Democratic Party; Pamyat; Russian National Unity; Russian nationalists (Soviet Union) Pro-coup and anti-Yeltsin demonstrators and organizations	(Russian Soviet Federative Socialist Republic) Democratic Russia; Armenian Revolutionary Federation; Popular Front of Azerbaijan (Belarus) Belarusian Popular Front; All-National Congress of the Chechen People; All-Tatar Public Center; People's Movement of Ukraine; UNA–UNSO (Lithuania) Sąjūdis; Popular Front of Latvia (Estonian Soviet Socialist Republic) Popular Front of Estonia
Diplomatic support: China; North Korea; Vietnam; Cuba; Laos; Yugoslavia; Afghanistan; Iraq; Libya; PLO; Sudan	Diplomatic support: United States; United Kingdom; NATO; (European Union) EEC; France; Germany; Israel; Italy; Holy See; Czechoslovakia; Romania; Hungary; Poland; Bulgaria; Croatia; Slovenia; Mongolia; Afghanistan; Turkey; Japan; South Korea; Pakistan; Saudi Arabia; Canada; Australia; New Zealand

Commanders and leaders
(Soviet Union) Gennady Yanayev (surrendered) (Soviet Union) Sergey Akhromeyev ‡‡ (Soviet Union) Dmitry Yazov (surrendered) (Soviet Union) Vladimir Kryuchkov (surrendered) (Soviet Union) Valentin Pavlov (surrendered) (Soviet Union) Boris Pugo ‡‡ (Soviet Union) Oleg Baklanov (surrendered) (Soviet Union) Vasily Starodubtsev (surrendered) (Soviet Union) Alexander Tizyakov (surrendered) (Soviet Union) Nikolay Kruchina ‡‡	Mikhail Gorbachev (Note: under house arrest) (Russian Soviet Federative Socialist Republic) Boris Yeltsin (Russian Soviet Federative Socialist Republic) Alexander Rutskoy (Russian Soviet Federative Socialist Republic) Ruslan Khasbulatov (Russian Soviet Federative Socialist Republic) Ivan Silayev (Russian Soviet Federative Socialist Republic) Gennady Burbulis (Russian Soviet Federative Socialist Republic) Andrei Kozyrev (Russian Soviet Federative Socialist Republic) Viktor Barannikov (Russian Soviet Federative Socialist Republic) Konstantin Kobets (Russian Soviet Federative Socialist Republic) Gavriil Popov (Russian Soviet Federative Socialist Republic) Pavel Grachev (Russian Soviet Federative Socialist Republic) Anatoly Sobchak
(Abkhaz Autonomous Soviet Socialist Republic) Vladislav Ardzinba (Abkhaz Autonomous Soviet Socialist Republic) Vladimir Mikanba (Azerbaijan Soviet Socialist Republic) Ayaz Mutallibov (Azerbaijan Soviet Socialist Republic) Hasan Hasanov (Byelorussian Soviet Socialist Republic) Anatoly Malofeyev (Byelorussian Soviet Socialist Republic) Nikolai Dementey (History of Chechnya and Ingushetia (1934–1993)) Doku Zavgayev (History of Chechnya and Ingushetia (1934–1993)) Sergey Bekov; Stepan Topal; Znaur Gassiyev (Tajik Soviet Socialist Republic) Qahhor Mahkamov (Tatar Autonomous Soviet Socialist Republic) Mintimer Shaimiev (Tatar Autonomous Soviet Socialist Republic) Mukhammat Sabirov; Igor Smirnov (Turkmen Soviet Socialist Republic) Saparmurat Niyazov (Uzbek Soviet Socialist Republic) Islam Karimov	(Armenian Soviet Socialist Republic) Levon Ter-Petrosyan (Estonian Soviet Socialist Republic) Edgar Savisaar (Georgian Soviet Socialist Republic) Zviad Gamsakhurdia (Karakalpak Autonomous Soviet Socialist Republic) Dauletbay Shamshetov (Karakalpak Autonomous Soviet Socialist Republic) Amin Tojiyev (Kazakh Soviet Socialist Republic) Nursultan Nazarbayev (Kirghiz Soviet Socialist Republic) Askar Akayev (Latvian Soviet Socialist Republic) Ivars Godmanis (Lithuanian Soviet Socialist Republic) Vytautas Landsbergis (Lithuanian Soviet Socialist Republic) Gediminas Vagnorius (Moldavian Soviet Socialist Republic) Mircea Snegur (Moldavian Soviet Socialist Republic) Valeriu Muravschi (Nakhichevan Autonomous Soviet Socialist Republic) Heydar Aliyev (Ukrainian Soviet Socialist Republic) Leonid Kravchuk (Ukrainian Soviet Socialist Republic) Vitold Fokin
(Russian Soviet Federative Socialist Republic) Valentin Kuptsov (Estonian Soviet Socialist Republic) Lembit Annus (Latvian Soviet Socialist Republic) Alfrēds Rubiks (Lithuanian Soviet Socialist Republic) Mykolas Burokevičius; Vladimir Zhirinovsky	(Azerbaijan) Abulfaz Elchibey (Belarus) Zianon Pazniak; Dzhokhar Dudayev; Fauziya Bayramova (Ukraine) Viacheslav Chornovil; Yuriy Shukhevych (Latvia) Dainis Īvāns

Casualties and losses
3 died by suicide: Boris Pugo, the Minister of Interior; Sergey Akhromeyev, a military advisor to Gorbachev; Nikolay Kruchina, the Administrator of Affairs of the Central Committee of the CPSU	3 civilians killed on 21 August

Between 18 and 22 August 1991, amidst the dissolution of the Soviet Union, a hardliner group of top military and civilian officials within the Communist Party of the Soviet Union (CPSU) attempted to forcibly seize power from Mikhail Gorbachev, who had been serving as the Soviet Union's president since March 1990 and as the CPSU's General Secretary since March 1985. Among the leaders of what is also known as the August Coup (Note: Russian: Августовский путч, romanized: Avgustovskiy Putch, lit. 'August Putsch') was Gennady Yanayev, who had been serving as the Soviet Union's vice president since December 1990.

Yanayev and his allies, who together formed the State Committee on the State of Emergency (Russian: ГКЧП, romanized: GKChP), had been motivated by their opposition to Gorbachev's political reforms, the collapse of Soviet hegemony over Eastern Europe, and the proposed New Union Treaty, which was to distribute much of the heavily centralized power of the Soviet government among each of the fifteen Union Republics. The initiative for de-centralization and increased autonomy had been spurred by Boris Yeltsin while he served as the Chairman of the Supreme Soviet of the Russian SFSR until July 1991; Yeltsin's demand opened a window for the GKChP to plan the coup d'état attempt.

Although KGB agents involved in the plot were successful in detaining Gorbachev at his dacha, they ultimately failed to apprehend Yeltsin—who had been both a critic and an ally of Gorbachev—as the GKChP's poor organization rendered it unable to subdue effective resistance mounted by both Yeltsin and a civilian campaign of anti-authoritarian protesters in Moscow. The coup d'état ended within two days; Gorbachev returned to office, but lost much of his influence as the country's dominant leader vis-à-vis Yeltsin, and the orchestrators were all stripped of their posts and later prosecuted by the Supreme Court of the Russian Federation. The CPSU as a whole became defunct immediately after the August Coup and was banned by the Russian Federation in November of that year.

Following the capitulation of the GKChP, popularly referred to as the "Gang of Eight", both the Supreme Court of the Russian Soviet Federative Socialist Republic (RSFSR) and Gorbachev described its actions as a coup attempt.

== Background ==
Since assuming power as General Secretary of the Communist Party of the Soviet Union in 1985, Gorbachev had embarked on an ambitious reform program embodied in the twin concepts of perestroika (economic and political restructuring) and glasnost (openness). These moves prompted resistance and suspicion on the part of hard-line members of the nomenklatura. The reforms also caused nationalist agitation on the part of the Soviet Union's non-Russian minorities to grow, and there were fears that some or all of the union republics might secede. In 1991, the Soviet Union was in a severe economic and political crisis. Scarcity of food, medicine, and other consumables was widespread, people had to stand in long lines to buy even essential goods, fuel stocks were as much as 50% lower than the estimated amount needed for the approaching winter, and inflation exceeded 300% per year, with factories lacking the cash needed to pay salaries.

In 1990, Estonia, Latvia, Lithuania and Armenia had already declared the restoration of their independence from the Soviet Union. In January 1991, a violent attempt to return Lithuania to the Soviet Union by force took place. About a week later, a similar attempt was engineered by local pro-Soviet forces to overthrow Latvian authorities. These attempts failed, and Lithuania and Latvia retained their statehood.

Russia declared its sovereignty on 12 June 1990 and thereafter limited the application of Soviet laws, in particular those governing finance and the economy, on Russian territory. The Supreme Soviet of the Russian SFSR adopted laws that contradicted Soviet laws (the so-called War of Laws).

In the unionwide referendum on 17 March 1991, boycotted by the Baltic states, Armenia, Georgia, and Moldova, a supermajority of residents in the other republics expressed the desire to retain the renewed Soviet Union, with 77.85% voting in favor. Following negotiations, eight of the remaining nine republics (Ukraine abstaining) approved the New Union Treaty with some conditions. The treaty was to make the Soviet Union a federation of independent republics called the Union of Soviet Sovereign Republics, with a common president, foreign policy, and military. Russia, Kazakhstan and Uzbekistan were to sign the Treaty in Moscow on 20 August 1991.

British historian Dan Stone wrote the following about the plotters' motivation:

The coup was the last gasp of those who were astonished at and felt betrayed by the precipitous collapse of the Soviet Union's empire in Eastern Europe and the swift destruction of the Warsaw Pact and Comecon that followed. Many feared the consequences of Gorbachev's German policies above all, not just for leaving officers unemployed but for sacrificing gains achieved in the Great Patriotic War to German revanchism and irredentism – after all, this had been the Kremlin's greatest fear since the end of the war.

== Preparation ==
=== Planning ===
The KGB began considering a coup in September 1990. Soviet politician Alexander Yakovlev began warning Gorbachev about the possibility of one after the 28th Party Congress in June 1990. On 11 December 1990, KGB Chairman Vladimir Kryuchkov made a "call for order" over the Moscow Programme television station. That day, he asked two KGB officers to prepare measures to be taken in the event a state of emergency was declared in the USSR. Later, Kryuchkov brought Soviet Defense Minister Dmitry Yazov, Central Control Commission Chairman Boris Pugo, Premier Valentin Pavlov, Vice President Gennady Yanayev, Soviet Defense Council deputy chief Oleg Baklanov, Gorbachev secretariat head Valery Boldin, and CPSU Central Committee Secretary Oleg Shenin into the conspiracy.

When Kryuchkov complained about the Soviet Union's growing instability to the Congress of People's Deputies, Gorbachev attempted to appease him by issuing a presidential decree enhancing the powers of the KGB and appointing Pugo to the Cabinet as Minister of Internal Affairs. Foreign Secretary Eduard Shevardnadze resigned in protest and rejected an offered appointment as vice president, warning that "a dictatorship is coming." Gorbachev was forced to appoint Yanayev in his place.

Beginning with the January Events in Lithuania, members of Gorbachev's Cabinet hoped that he could be persuaded to declare a state of emergency and "restore order," and formed the State Committee on the State of Emergency (GKChP).

On 17 June 1991, Soviet premier Pavlov requested extraordinary powers from the Supreme Soviet. Several days later, Moscow Mayor Gavriil Popov informed U.S. ambassador to the Soviet Union Jack F. Matlock Jr. that a coup against Gorbachev was being planned. When Matlock tried to warn him, Gorbachev falsely assumed that his own Cabinet was not involved and underestimated the risk of a coup. Gorbachev reversed Pavlov's request for more powers and jokingly told his Cabinet "The coup is over," remaining oblivious to their plans.

On 23 July 1991, several party functionaries and literati published a piece in the hardline Sovetskaya Rossiya newspaper, entitled "A Word to the People", that called for decisive action to prevent calamity.

Six days later, on 29 July, Gorbachev, Russian president Boris Yeltsin and Kazakh president Nursultan Nazarbayev discussed the possibility of replacing hardliners such as Pavlov, Yazov, Kryuchkov and Pugo with more liberal figures, with Nazarbayev as Prime Minister (in Pavlov's place). Kryuchkov, who had placed Gorbachev under close surveillance as Subject 110 several months earlier, eventually got wind of the conversation from an electronic bug planted by Gorbachev's bodyguard, Vladimir Medvedev. Yeltsin also prepared for a coup by establishing a secret defense committee, ordering military and KGB commands to side with RSFSR authorities and establishing a "reserve government" about 70 kilometers from Sverdlovsk under Deputy Prime Minister Oleg Lobov.

=== Commencement ===
On 4 August, Gorbachev went on holiday to his dacha in Foros, Crimea. He planned to return to Moscow in time for the New Union Treaty signing on 20 August. On 15 August, the text of the draft treaty was published, which would have stripped the coup planners of much of their authority.

On 17 August, the members of the GKChP met at a KGB guesthouse in Moscow and studied the treaty document. Decisions were made to introduce a state of emergency from 19 August, to form a State Emergency Committee, and require Gorbachev to sign the relevant decrees or to resign and transfer powers to Vice President Yanayev. They believed the pact would pave the way for the Soviet Union's breakup, and decided it was time to act. The next day, Baklanov, Boldin, Shenin, and Soviet Deputy Defense Minister General Valentin Varennikov flew to Crimea for a meeting with Gorbachev. Yazov ordered General Pavel Grachev, commander of the Soviet Airborne Forces, to begin coordinating with KGB Deputy Chairmen Viktor Grushko and Genii Ageev to implement martial law.

At 4:32 pm on 18 August, the GKChP cut communications to Gorbachev's dacha, including telephone landlines and the nuclear command and control system. Eight minutes later Lieutenant General Yuri Plekhanov, Head of the Ninth Chief Directorate of the KGB, allowed the group into Gorbachev's dacha. Gorbachev realized what was happening after discovering the telephone outages. Baklanov, Boldin, Shenin and Varennikov demanded that Gorbachev either declare a state of emergency or resign and name Yanayev as acting president to allow the members of the GKChP "to restore order" to the country.

Gorbachev has always claimed that he refused point-blank to accept the ultimatum. Varennikov has insisted that Gorbachev said: "Damn you. Do what you want. But report my opinion!" However, those present at the dacha at the time testified that Baklanov, Boldin, Shenin and Varennikov had been clearly disappointed and nervous after the meeting with Gorbachev. Gorbachev is said to have insulted Varennikov by pretending to forget his name, and to have told his former trusted advisor Boldin "Shut up, you prick! How dare you give me lectures about the situation in the country!" With Gorbachev's refusal, the conspirators ordered that he remain confined to the dacha. Additional KGB security guards were placed at the dacha gates with orders to stop anybody from leaving.

At 7:30 pm, Baklanov, Boldin, Shenin and Varennikov flew to Moscow, accompanied by Plekhanov. His deputy, Vyacheslav Generalov, remained "on the farm" in Foros.

At 8:00 pm, Yanayev, Pavlov, Kryuchkov, Yazov, Pugo and Soviet Supreme Soviet Chairman Anatoly Lukyanov gathered in the Kremlin cabinet of the Prime Minister, discussing and editing the documents of the State Emergency Committee. At 10:15 pm, they were joined by Baklanov, Shenin, Boldin, Varennikov and Plekhanov. It was decided to publicly declare Gorbachev ill. Yanayev hesitated, but the others convinced him that leadership and responsibility would be collective.

At 11:25 pm, Yanayev signed a decree entrusting himself with presidential powers.

GKChP members ordered that 250,000 pairs of handcuffs from a factory in Pskov be sent to Moscow, also ordering 300,000 arrest forms. Kryuchkov doubled the pay of all KGB personnel, called them back from holiday, and placed them on alert. Lefortovo Prison was emptied to receive prisoners.

== Chronology ==
The members of the GKChP met in the Kremlin after Baklanov, Boldin, Shenin and Varennikov returned from Crimea. Yanayev (who had only just been persuaded to join the plot), Pavlov and Baklanov signed the so-called "Declaration of the Soviet Leadership", which declared a state of emergency in the entirety of the USSR and announced that the State Committee on the State of Emergency (Государственный Комитет по Чрезвычайному Положению, ГКЧП, or Gosudarstvenniy Komitet po Chrezvichaynomu Polozheniyu, GKChP) had been created "to manage the country and effectively maintain the regime of the state of emergency". The GKChP included the following members:

- Gennady Yanayev, Vice President
- Valentin Pavlov, Prime Minister
- Vladimir Kryuchkov, head of the KGB
- Dmitry Yazov, Minister of Defence
- Boris Pugo, Minister of Interior
- Oleg Baklanov, First Deputy Chairman of the Defense Council under the President of the USSR
- Vasily Starodubtsev, Chairman of the Peasant Union
- Alexander Tizyakov, President of the Association of the State Enterprises and Objects of Industry, Transport, and Communications

Yanayev signed the decree naming himself acting Soviet President, using the pretense of Gorbachev's inability to perform presidential duties due to "illness". However, Russian investigators later identified Kryuchkov as the key planner of the coup. Yanayev later claimed that he had been forced to participate in the coup under the threat of arrest. The eight aforementioned GKChP members became known as the "Gang of Eight".

The GKChP banned all Moscow newspapers except for nine party-controlled newspapers. It also issued a populist declaration which stated that "the honour and dignity of the Soviet man must be restored."

=== Monday 19 August ===
==== Early hours ====
At 1:00 am, Yanayev signed documents on the formation of the State Committee for the State of Emergency (GKChP), consisting of himself, Pavlov, Kryuchkov, Yazov, Pugo, Baklanov, Tizyakov and Starodubtsev. Included in the documents was the "Appeal to the Soviet people".

The GKChP members present signed GKChP Resolution No. 1, which introduced the following: a state of emergency "in certain areas of the USSR" lasting six months from 4:00 am Moscow time on 19 August; the prohibition of rallies, demonstrations and strikes; suspension of the activities of political parties, public organizations and mass movements that impede the normalization of the situation; and the allocation of up to 1,500 square metres (0.4 acres) of land to all interested city residents for personal use.

At 4:00 am, the Sevastopol regiment of KGB border troops surrounded Gorbachev's presidential dacha in Foros. By order of Soviet Air Defense Chief of Staff Colonel-General Igor Maltsev, two tractors blocked the runway on which the President's aircraft were located: a Tu-134 jet and Mi-8 helicopter.

==== Morning ====
Starting at 6:00 am, all of the GKChP documents were broadcast over state radio and television. The KGB immediately issued an arrest list that included newly elected Russian SFSR president Boris Yeltsin, his allies, and the leaders of the umbrella activist group Democratic Russia. The Russian SFSR-controlled Radio Rossii and Televidenie Rossii, plus Ekho Moskvy, the only independent political radio station, were taken off the air. However, the latter station later resumed its broadcasts and became a source of reliable information during the coup. The BBC World Service and Voice of America were also able to provide continuous coverage. Gorbachev and his family heard the news from a BBC bulletin on a small Sony transistor radio that had not been seized. For the next several days, he refused to take food from outside the dacha to avoid being poisoned, and took long outdoor strolls to refute reports of his ill health.

Under Yanayev's orders, units of the Tamanskaya mechanized infantry and Kantemirovskaya armored division rolled into Moscow, along with airborne troops. Around 4,000 soldiers, 350 tanks, 300 armoured personnel carriers and 420 trucks were sent to Moscow. Four Russian SFSR people's deputies were detained by the KGB at a Soviet Army base near the capital. However, almost no other arrests were made by the KGB during the coup. Ulysse Gosset and Vladimir Federovski later alleged that the KGB was planning to carry out a much larger wave of arrests two weeks after the coup, after which it would have abolished almost all legislative and local administrative structures under a highly centralized Council of Ministers. Yanayev instructed Foreign Minister Alexander Bessmertnykh to make a statement requesting formal diplomatic recognition from foreign governments and the United Nations.

The GKChP conspirators considered detaining Yeltsin upon his return from a visit to Kazakhstan on 17 August but failed when Yeltsin redirected his flight from Chkalovsky Air Base northeast of Moscow to Vnukovo Airport southwest of the city. Afterwards, they considered capturing him at his dacha near Moscow. The KGB Alpha Group surrounded his dacha with Spetsnaz, but for undisclosed reasons did not apprehend him. The commanding officer, Viktor Karpukhin, later alleged that he had received an order from Kryuchkov to arrest Yeltsin but disobeyed it, although his account has been questioned. The failure to arrest Yeltsin proved fatal to the plotters' plans. After the announcement of the coup at 6:30 am, Yeltsin began inviting prominent Russian officials to his dacha, including Leningrad Mayor Anatoly Sobchak, Moscow Deputy Mayor Yury Luzhkov, Colonel-General Konstantin Kobets, RSFSR Prime Minister Ivan Silayev, RSFSR Vice President Alexander Rutskoy, and RSFSR Supreme Soviet Chairman Ruslan Khasbulatov.

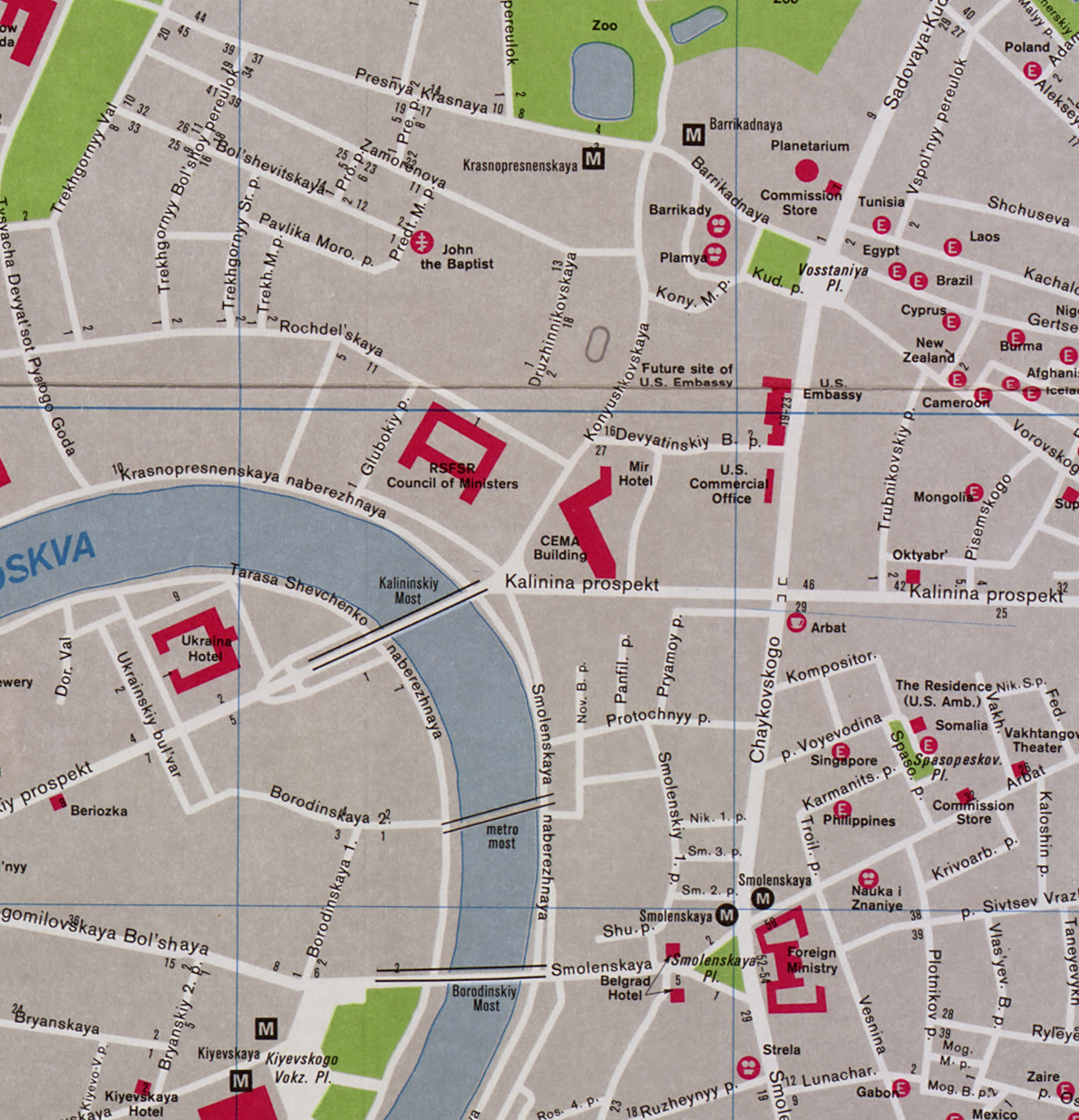
U.S. map of Moscow with 1980s street names

Yeltsin initially wanted to remain at the dacha and organize a rival government, but Kobets advised his group to travel to the White House, Russia's parliament building, to maintain communications with coup opponents. They arrived and occupied the building at 9:00 am. Together with Silayev and Khasbulatov, Yeltsin issued a declaration "To the Citizens of Russia" that condemned the GKChP's actions as a reactionary anti-constitutional coup. The military was urged not to take part in the coup, and local authorities were asked to follow laws from the RSFSR president rather than the GKChP. Although he initially avoided the measure to avoid sparking a civil war, Yeltsin also subsequently took command of all Soviet military and security forces in the RSFSR. The joint declaration called for a general strike, with the demand to let Gorbachev address the people. This declaration was distributed around Moscow in the form of flyers, and disseminated nationwide through medium-wave radio and Usenet newsgroups via the RELCOM computer network. Izvestia newspaper workers threatened to go on strike unless Yeltsin's proclamation was printed in the paper.

The GKChP relied on regional and local soviets, mostly still dominated by the Communist Party, to support the coup by forming emergency committees to repress dissidence. The CPSU Secretariat under Boldin sent coded telegrams to local party committees to assist the coup. Yeltsin's authorities later discovered that nearly 70 percent of the committees either backed it or attempted to remain neutral. Within the RSFSR, the oblasts of Samara, Lipetsk, Tambov, Saratov, Orenburg, Irkutsk, and Tomsk and the krai of Altai and Krasnodar all supported the coup and pressured raikom to do so as well, while only three oblasts aside from Moscow and Leningrad opposed it. However, some of the soviets faced internal resistance against emergency rule. The Autonomous Soviet Socialist Republics of Tatarstan, Checheno-Ingushetia, and Abkhazia all sided with the GKChP. Soviet Armed Forces officers seized control of city halls and government buildings around the country claiming to be in control, as well as television stations in the Baltic states.

The Soviet public was divided on the coup. A poll in the RSFSR by Mnenie on the morning of 19 August showed that 23.6 percent of Russians believed the GKChP could improve living standards, while 41.9 percent had no opinion. However, separate polls by Interfax showed that many Russians, including 71 percent of Leningrad residents, feared the return of mass repression. The GKChP enjoyed strong support in the Russian-majority regions of Estonia and Transnistria, while Yeltsin enjoyed strong support in Sverdlovsk and Nizhny Novgorod.

At 10:00 am, Rutskoy, Silayev, and Khasbulatov delivered a letter to Lukyanov demanding a medical exam of Gorbachev by the World Health Organization and a meeting between themselves, Yeltsin, Gorbachev, and Yanayev within 24 hours. Rutskoy later visited Patriarch Alexy II of Moscow, spiritual leader of the Russian Orthodox Church, and convinced him to declare support for Yeltsin. Meanwhile, in Leningrad, Military District Commander Viktor Samsonov ordered the formation of an emergency committee for the city, chaired by Leningrad First Secretary Boris Gidaspov, to circumvent Sobchak's democratically elected municipal government. Samsonov's troops were ultimately blocked by hundreds of thousands of demonstrators supported by the police, which forced Leningrad Television to broadcast a statement by Sobchak. Workers at the Kirov Plant went on strike in support of Yeltsin. Moscow First Secretary Yuri Prokofev attempted a similar maneuver in the capital but was rebuffed when Boris Nikolskii refused to accept the office of Mayor of Moscow. At 11:00 am, RSFSR Foreign Minister Andrei Kozyrev held a press conference for foreign journalists and diplomats, and gained the support of most of the West for Yeltsin.

==== Afternoon and evening ====
That afternoon, Moscow citizens began gathering around the White House, erecting barricades around it. In response, Yanayev declared a state of emergency in Moscow at 4:00 pm. He declared at a 5:00 pm press conference that Gorbachev was "resting". He said: "Over these years he has got very tired and needs some time to get his health back." Yanayev's shaking hands led some people to think he was drunk, and his trembling voice and weak posture made his words unconvincing. Victoria E. Bonnell and Gregory Frieden noted that the press conference allowed spontaneous questioning from journalists who openly accused the GKChP of carrying out a coup, as well as the lack of censorship by news crews, who did not hide Yanayev's erratic motions the way they had with past leaders such as Leonid Brezhnev, making the coup leaders appear more incompetent to Soviet audiences. Gorbachev's security detail managed to construct a makeshift television antenna so he and his family could watch the press conference. After viewing the conference, Gorbachev expressed confidence that Yeltsin would be able to stop the coup. That night, his family smuggled out a videotape of Gorbachev condemning the coup.

Yanayev and the rest of the State Committee ordered the Cabinet of Ministers to alter the five-year plan of the time to relieve the housing shortage. All city dwellers were each given 1,000 square metres (1/3 acre) to combat winter shortages by growing fruits and vegetables. Due to the illness of Valentin Pavlov, the duties of the Soviet head of the government were entrusted to First Deputy Prime Minister Vitaly Doguzhiyev.

Meanwhile, the Soviet forces carrying out the coup began to suffer from mass defections to the RSFSR as well as soldiers refusing to obey orders to shoot civilians. Yeltsin asked his followers not to harass the soldiers and offered amnesty for any military servicemen who defected to oppose the coup. Major Evdokimov, chief of staff of a tank battalion of the Tamanskaya Division guarding the White House, declared his loyalty to the leadership of the Russian SFSR. Yeltsin climbed one of the tanks and addressed the crowd. Unexpectedly, this episode was included in the state media's evening news. Soviet Armed Forces officers loyal to the GKChP tried to prevent defections by confining soldiers to their barracks, but this only limited the availability of forces to carry out the coup.

=== Tuesday 20 August ===
The position of the Supreme Soviets of the Republics and regions in relation to the GKChP (coup plotters) on 20 August 1991. Support for the GKChP Resistance to the GKChP Neutrality or no reaction

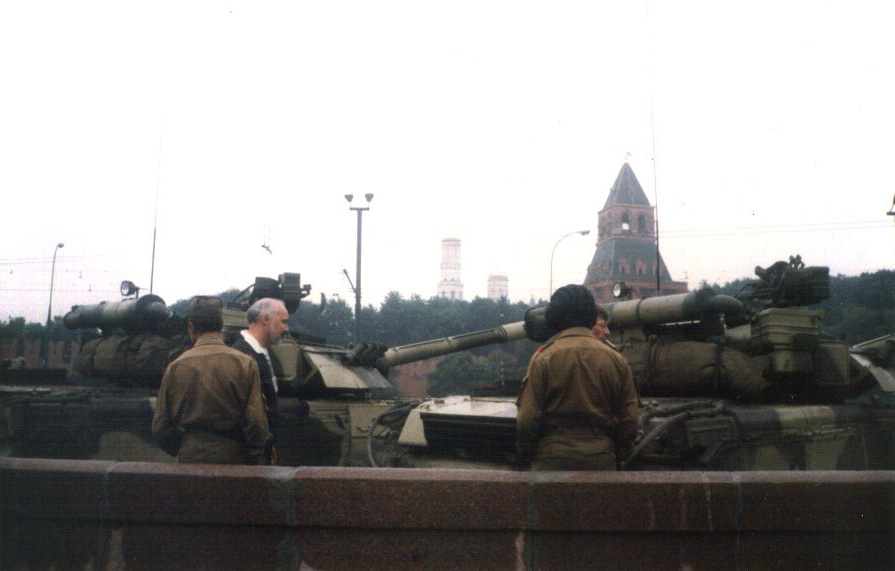
Tanks in Red Square

At 8:00 am, the Soviet General Staff ordered that the Cheget briefcase controlling Soviet nuclear weapons be returned to Moscow. Although Gorbachev discovered that the GKChP's actions had cut off communications with the nuclear duty officers, the Cheget was returned to the capital by 2:00 pm. However, Soviet Air Force Commander-in-Chief Yevgeny Shaposhnikov opposed the coup and claimed in his memoirs that he and the commanders of the Soviet Navy and the Strategic Rocket Forces told Yazov that they would not follow orders for a nuclear launch. After the coup, Gorbachev refused to admit that he had lost control of the country's nuclear weapons.

At noon, Moscow military district commander General Nikolai Kalinin, whom Yanayev appointed military commandant of Moscow, declared a curfew in Moscow from 11:00 pm to 5:00 am, effective 20 August. This was understood as a sign that an attack on the White House was imminent.

The defenders of the White House prepared themselves, most being unarmed. Evdokimov's tanks were moved from the White House in the evening. The makeshift White House defense headquarters was headed by General Konstantin Kobets, a Russian SFSR people's deputy. Outside, Eduard Shevardnadze, Mstislav Rostropovich, and Yelena Bonner delivered speeches in support of Yeltsin.

In the afternoon, Kryuchkov, Yazov and Pugo finally decided to attack the White House. This decision was supported by other GKChP members (with the exception of Pavlov, who had been sent to his dacha due to drunkenness). Kryuchkov's and Yazov's deputies, KGB general Gennady Ageyev and Army general Vladislav Achalov, planned the assault, codenamed "Operation Grom" (Thunder), which would gather elements of the Alpha Group and Vympel elite special forces units, supported by paratroopers, Moscow OMON, Internal Troops of the ODON, three tank companies and a helicopter squadron. Alpha Group commander General Viktor Karpukhin and other senior unit officers, together with Airborne deputy commander Gen. Alexander Lebed mingled with the crowds near the White House and assessed the possibility of such an operation. Afterwards, Karpukhin and Vympel commander Colonel Boris Beskov tried to convince Ageyev that the operation would result in bloodshed and should be cancelled. Lebed, with the consent of his superior Pavel Grachev, returned to the White House and secretly informed the defense headquarters that the attack would begin at 2:00 am the following morning.

While the events were unfolding in the capital, Estonia's Supreme Council declared at 11:03 pm the full reinstatement of the independent status of the Republic of Estonia after 51 years.

State-controlled TASS dispatches from 20 August emphasize a hardline approach against crime, especially economic crimes and the Russian mafia, which the GKChP blamed on increasing trade with the West. Draft decrees were later discovered which would have allowed military and police patrols to shoot "hooligans," including pro-democracy demonstrators.

=== Wednesday 21 August ===
At about 1:00 am, not far from the White House, trolleybuses and street cleaning machines were used to barricade a tunnel against arriving Taman Guards infantry fighting vehicles (IFVs), commanded by Captain Sergey Surovikin, who years later rose to army general and commander of Russian forces in the 2022 invasion of Ukraine. Three men were killed in the ensuing clash: Dmitry Komar, Vladimir Usov, and Ilya Krichevsky; several others were wounded. Komar, a 22-year-old Soviet-Afghan War veteran, was shot and crushed trying to cover a moving IFV's observation slit. Usov, a 37-year-old economist, was killed by a stray bullet while coming to Komar's aid. The crowd set fire to an IFV and Krichevsky, a 28-year-old architect, was shot dead as the troops pulled back. The three men were posthumously awarded the title Hero of the Soviet Union. According to journalist and democracy campaigner Sergey Parkhomenko, who was in the crowd defending the White House, "those deaths played a crucial role: both sides were so horrified that it brought a halt to everything." Alpha Group and Vympel did not move to the White House as planned, and Yazov ordered the troops to pull out of Moscow. Reports also surfaced that Gorbachev had been placed under house arrest in Crimea. During the final day of her family's exile, Raisa Gorbacheva suffered a minor stroke.

At 8:00 am, the troops began to leave Moscow.

Between 8:00 and 9:00 am, the GKChP members met in the Defence Ministry and, not knowing what to do, decided to send Kryuchkov, Yazov, Baklanov, Tizyakov, Anatoly Lukyanov, and Deputy CPSU General Secretary Vladimir Ivashko to Crimea to meet Gorbachev, who refused to meet them when they arrived.

At 10:00 am, the session of the Supreme Soviet of the RSFSR opened in the White House, at which President Yeltsin spoke.

At 1:00 pm, the Soviet Cabinet of Ministers circulated a statement about its non-involvement in the putsch. At 1:20 pm, Kryuchkov, Yazov, Baklanov, Tizyakov, Lukyanov and CPSU Central Committee Deputy General Secretary Vladimir Ivashko left for the airport, getting stuck in a traffic jam created by the Taman Division armored vehicles returning to their base.

At 2:00 pm, the CPSU Central Committee Secretariat issued a statement demanding that the GKChP clarify the fate of the head of the Communist Party, Mikhail Gorbachev.

At 2:30 pm, Soviet Minister of Internal Affairs Boris Pugo signed the last GKChP order – a cypher telegram to the regional departments of internal affairs with a demand to strengthen the security of television and radio organizations and report on all violations of the GKChP Resolution on information control.

At 4:08 pm, the plane with the GKChP delegation landed in Crimea. Around 4:00 pm, the Presidium of the Supreme Soviet of the USSR, chaired by the heads of the chambers of the union parliament, adopted a resolution in which it declared illegal the removal of the Soviet president from his duties and their transfer to the Vice President, and in this vein demanded that Yanayev cancel the decrees and emergency orders based on them as legally invalid from the moment they were signed.

At 4:52 pm, a group of Russian deputies and public figures led by RSFSR Vice President Alexander Rutskoy, as well as Soviet Security Council members Yevgeny Primakov and Vadim Bakatin, flew to Gorbachev's dacha in Foros. They were accompanied by 36 officers of the RSFSR Ministry of Internal Affairs armed with machine guns, under the command of RSFSR Deputy Minister of Internal Affairs Andrei Dunaev.

Eight minutes later, at 5:00 pm, the GKChP delegation arrived at the presidential dacha. President Gorbachev refused to receive it and demanded that communication to the outside world be restored. At the same time, Yanayev signed a decree dissolving the State Emergency Committee and declaring all of its decisions invalid.

At 7:16 pm, the plane of the Russian delegation led by Rutskoy landed in Crimea.

At 8:00 pm, the Soviet General Prosecutor's Office initiated a criminal case into the attempted coup.

At 8:10 pm, Rutskoy and his delegation went to see Gorbachev. According to eyewitnesses, the meeting was cordial and joyful, allowing them to momentarily forget divisions between Soviet and Russian authorities.

From 9:40 to 10:10 pm, Gorbachev received Lukyanov and Ivashko in the presence of Rutskoy and Primakov, accusing the USSR Supreme Soviet Speaker of treason, and the party deputy of inaction during the putsch.

Around 10:00 pm, RSFSR Prosecutor General Valentin Stepankov signed an arrest warrant for the Emergency Committee members.

That day, the Supreme Council of the Republic of Latvia declared its sovereignty officially completed with a law passed by its deputies, confirming the independence restoration act of 4 May as an official act. In Estonia, just a day after the restitution of the country's full independence, the Tallinn TV Tower was taken over by Soviet Russian airborne troops. But while television broadcasts were cut for a time, the radio signal was kept on the air after a handful of Estonian Defence League (the unified paramilitary forces of Estonia) members barricaded themselves in the tower's broadcasting studio. That evening, as news from Moscow about the coup's failure reached Tallinn, the Russian paratroopers left the TV tower and the Estonian capital.

=== Thursday 22 August ===
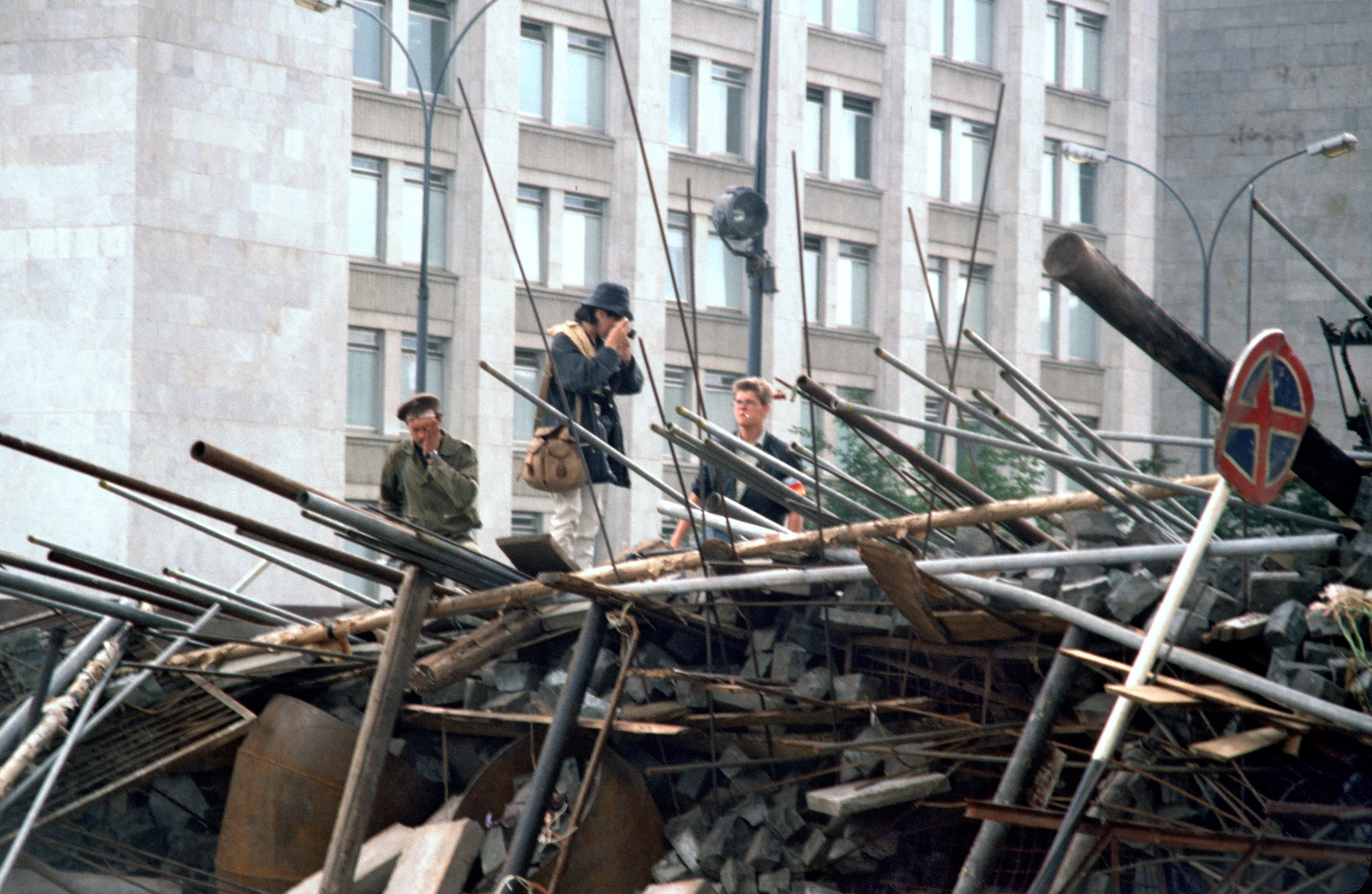
22 August 1991

At one minute past midnight, Gorbachev, his family and assistants flew to Moscow on Rutskoy's plane. The GKChP members were sent back on a different plane; only Kryuchkov flew in the presidential plane, under police custody (according to Rutskoy, "they [would] definitely not be shot down with him on board"). Upon arrival, Kryuchkov, Yazov and Tizyakov were arrested on the airfield, which was illegal under Soviet law as officials representing the central government could only be arrested and tried under Soviet law, which prevailed over the laws of the constituent republics.

At 2:00 am, when Gorbachev arrived at Moscow's Vnukovo Airport, television showed live footage of him walking down the airstairs wearing a knitted sweater. Later, he would be criticized for not going to the White House, but to rest at his dacha.

At 6:00 am, Soviet Vice President Yanayev was arrested in his office.

Boris Pugo and his wife died by suicide after being contacted by the RSFSR for a meeting over his role in the coup attempt.

=== Friday 23 August ===
Pavlov, Starodubtsev, Baklanov, Boldin, and Shenin would all be taken into custody within the next 48 hours.

== Aftermath ==
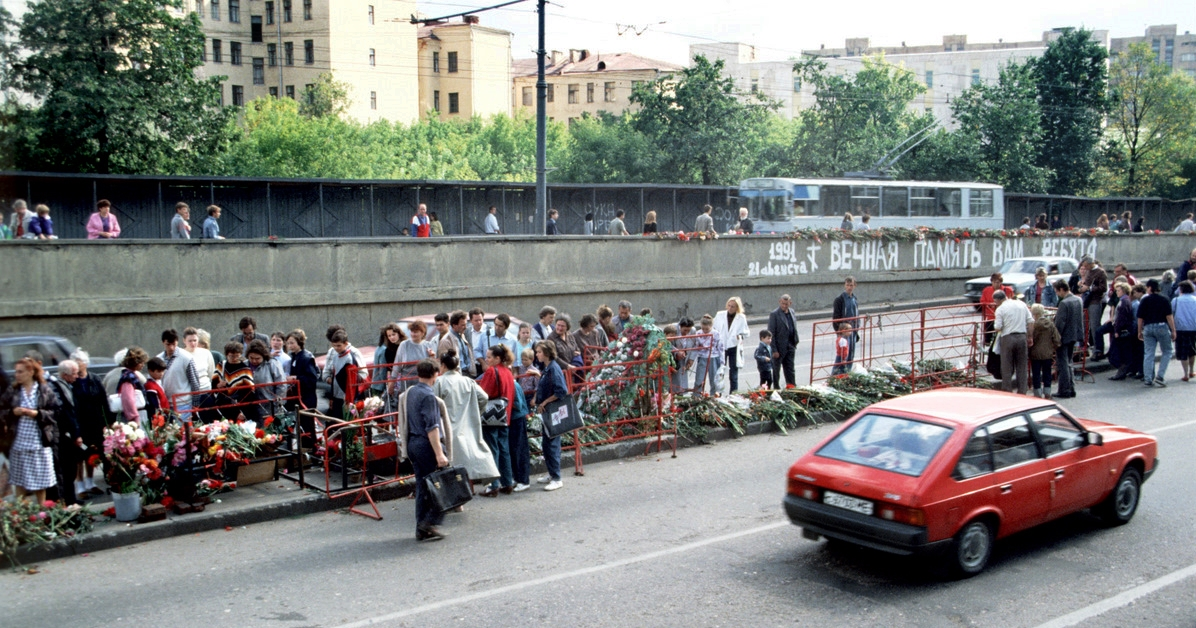
Victims' place of death

Since several heads of the regional executive committees supported the GKChP, on 21 August 1991 the Supreme Soviet of the Russian SFSR adopted Decision No. 1626-1, which authorized Russian president Boris Yeltsin to appoint heads of regional administrations, although the Constitution of the Russian SFSR did not empower the president with such authority. The Russian Supreme Soviet passed another decision the following day declaring the old imperial colors Russia's national flag; it replaced the Russian SFSR flag two months later.

On the night of 24 August, the Felix Dzerzhinsky statue in front of the KGB building at Dzerzhinskiy Square (Lubianka) was dismantled, while thousands of Moscow citizens took part in the funeral of Dmitry Komar, Vladimir Usov and Ilya Krichevsky, the three citizens who had died in the tunnel incident. Gorbachev posthumously awarded them with the title of Hero of the Soviet Union. Yeltsin asked their relatives to forgive him for not being able to prevent their deaths.

=== End of the CPSU ===
Gorbachev initially tried to defend the CPSU, proclaiming at a 22 August press conference that it still represented a "progressive force" despite its leaders' participation in the coup. Gorbachev resigned as CPSU general secretary on 24 August. Vladimir Ivashko replaced him as acting General Secretary, but resigned on 29 August when the Supreme Soviet of the USSR suspended the activities of the party throughout the Soviet Union.

In a decree, Yeltsin ordered the transfer of the CPSU archives to the state archive authorities, and nationalized all CPSU assets in the Russian SFSR (these included not only party committee headquarters but also assets such as educational institutions and hotels). The party's Central Committee headquarters were handed over to the Government of Moscow. On 6 November, Yeltsin issued a decree banning the party in Russia.

=== The Dissolution of the Soviet Union ===
Estonia had declared re-independence on 20 August, Latvia the following day, while Lithuania had already done so on 11 March the previous year.

On 24 August 1991, Mikhail Gorbachev created the so-called "Committee for the Operational Management of the Soviet Economy" (Комитет по оперативному управлению народным хозяйством СССР), to replace the USSR Cabinet of Ministers headed by Valentin Pavlov, a GKChP member. Russian prime minister Ivan Silayev headed the committee.

That same day, Ukraine's Verkhovna Rada adopted the Act of Independence of Ukraine and called for a referendum on support of the Act of Independence.

On 25 August, the Supreme Soviet of the Byelorussian SSR announced its Declaration of Sovereignty as a constitutional law.

On 28 August, the Supreme Soviet of the USSR dismissed Prime Minister Pavlov and entrusted the functions of the Soviet government to the Committee for the Operational Management of the Soviet Economy. The next day, Supreme Soviet Chairman Anatoly Lukyanov was arrested.

On 27 August, the Supreme Soviet of Moldova declared the independence of Moldova from the Soviet Union. The Supreme Soviets of Azerbaijan and Kyrgyzstan did the same on 30 and 31 August, respectively.

On 5 September, the Congress of People's Deputies of the Soviet Union adopted Soviet Law No. 2392-1 "On the Authorities of the Soviet Union in the Transitional Period", replacing itself with the Supreme Soviet of the Soviet Union. Two new legislative chambers – the Soviet of the Union (Совет Союза) and the Soviet of Republics (Совет Республик) – replaced the Soviet of the Union and the Soviet of Nationalities (both elected by the USSR Congress of People's Deputies). The Soviet of the Union was to be formed by the popularly elected USSR people's deputies and would only consider issues concerning civil rights and freedoms and other issues which did not fall under the jurisdiction of the Soviet of Republics. Its decisions would have to be reviewed by the Soviet of Republics. The Soviet of Republics was to include 20 deputies from each union republic and one deputy to represent each autonomous region of each union republic (both Soviet people's deputies and republics' people's deputies) delegated by the legislatures of the union republic. Russia, with 52 delegates, was an exception. However, the delegation of each union republic was to have only one vote in the Soviet of Republics. The laws were to be first adopted by the Soviet of the Union and then by the Soviet of Republics, which would set procedures for the central government, approve the appointment of central ministers and consider inter-republic agreements. Also created was the Soviet State Council (Государственный совет СССР), which included the Soviet president and the presidents of union republics. The "Committee for the Operational Management of the Soviet Economy" was replaced by the USSR Inter-republic Economic Committee (Межреспубликанский экономический комитет СССР), also headed by Ivan Silayev.

On 6 September, the newly created Soviet State Council recognized the independence of Estonia, Latvia and Lithuania. On 9 September, the Supreme Soviet of Tajikistan declared the independence of Tajikistan from the Soviet Union. Also in September, over 99% percent of voters in Armenia voted for independence of the republic in a referendum. The immediate aftermath of the vote was the Armenian Supreme Soviet's declaration of independence on 21 September. On 27 October, the Supreme Soviet of Turkmenistan declared the independence of Turkmenistan from the Soviet Union. On 1 December, Ukraine held a referendum, in which more than 90% of residents supported the Act of Independence of Ukraine.

By November, the only Soviet Republics that had not declared independence were Russia, Kazakhstan and Uzbekistan. That same month, seven republics (Russia, Belarus, Kazakhstan, Uzbekistan, Kyrgyzstan, Turkmenistan, and Tajikistan) agreed to a new union treaty that would form a confederation called the Union of Sovereign States. However, this confederation never materialized.

On 8 December, Boris Yeltsin, Leonid Kravchuk and Stanislav Shushkevich – the leaders of Russia, Ukraine, and Belarus (which had adopted the name in August 1991) – as well as the prime ministers of the three republics, met in Minsk, Belarus, to sign the Belovezha Accords. The accords declared that the Soviet Union had ceased to exist "as a subject of international law and geopolitical reality". It repudiated the 1922 union treaty that established the Soviet Union and established the Commonwealth of Independent States (CIS) in the Union's place. On 12 December, the Supreme Soviet of the Russian SFSR ratified the accords and recalled the Russian deputies from the Supreme Soviet of the USSR. Although this has been interpreted as the moment that Russia seceded from the union, Russia took the position that it was not possible to secede from a state that no longer existed. The lower chamber of the Supreme Soviet, the Council of the Union, was forced to halt its operations, as the departure of the Russian deputies left it without a quorum.

Doubts remained about the legitimacy of the 8 December accords, since only three republics took part. Thus, on 21 December in Alma-Ata, the Alma-Ata Protocol expanded the CIS to include Armenia, Azerbaijan, Moldova and the five republics of Central Asia. They also preemptively accepted Gorbachev's resignation. With 11 of the 12 remaining republics (all except Georgia) having agreed that the Union no longer existed, Gorbachev bowed to the inevitable and said he would resign as soon as the CIS became a reality (Georgia joined the CIS in 1993, only to withdraw in 2008 after its war with Russia; the three Baltic states were never a part of the commonwealth, instead joining both the European Union and NATO in 2004.)

On 24 December 1991, the Russian SFSR – now renamed the Russian Federation – with the concurrence of the other republics of the Commonwealth of Independent States, informed the United Nations that it would inherit the Soviet Union's membership in the UN – including the Soviet Union's permanent seat on the United Nations Security Council. No member state of the UN formally objected to this step. The legitimacy of this act has been questioned by some legal scholars as the Soviet Union itself was not constitutionally succeeded by the Russian Federation, but merely dissolved. Others argued that the international community had already established the precedent of recognizing the Soviet Union as the legal successor of the Russian Empire, and so recognizing the Russian Federation as the Soviet Union's successor state was valid.

On 25 December, Gorbachev announced his resignation as President of the Soviet Union. The red hammer and sickle flag of the Soviet Union was lowered from the Senate building in the Kremlin and replaced with the tricolour flag of Russia. The next day, 26 December, the Soviet of Republics, the upper chamber of the Supreme Soviet, formally voted the Soviet Union out of existence (the lower chamber, the Council of the Union, had been left without a quorum after the Russian deputies withdrew), thus ending the life of the world's first and oldest socialist state. All former Soviet embassies became Russian embassies, and Russia received all nuclear weapons located in other former republics by 1996. A constitutional crisis in late 1993 escalated into violence, and the new Russian constitution that came into force at the end of the year abolished the last vestiges of the Soviet political system.

=== Beginning of radical economic reforms in Russia ===
On 1 November 1991, the RSFSR Congress of People's Deputies issued Decision No. 1831-1 "On the Legal Support of the Economic Reform" whereby the Russian president (Boris Yeltsin) was granted the right to issue decrees required for economic reform even if they contravened existing laws. Such decrees entered into force if they were not repealed within 7 days by the Supreme Soviet of the Russian SFSR or its Presidium. Five days later, Boris Yeltsin, in addition to his duties as president, assumed those of the prime minister. Yegor Gaidar became deputy prime minister and simultaneously economic and finance minister. On 15 November 1991, Boris Yeltsin issued Decree No. 213 "On the Liberalization of Foreign Economic Activity on the Territory of the RSFSR", whereby all Russian companies were allowed to import and export goods and acquire foreign currency (all foreign trade had previously been tightly controlled by the state). Following the issuance of Decree No. 213, on 3 December 1991 Boris Yeltsin issued Decree No. 297 "On the Measures to Liberalize Prices", whereby from 2 January 1992, most previously existing price controls were abolished.

=== Trial of GKChP members ===
The GKChP members and their accomplices were charged with treason in the form of a conspiracy aimed at capturing power. However, by January 1993, they had all been released from custody pending trial. The trial in the Military Chamber of the Russian Supreme Court began on 14 April 1993. On 23 February 1994, the State Duma declared amnesty for all GKChP members and their accomplices, along with the participants of the October 1993 crisis. They all accepted the amnesty, except for General Varennikov, who demanded the continuation of the trial and who was finally acquitted on 11 August 1994. The Russian Procuracy also wanted to charge former Deputy Defense Minister Vladislav Achalov, but the Russian Supreme Soviet refused to lift his immunity. Additionally, the Procuracy refrained from charging numerous other individuals accused of complicity in the coup, including the Army Chief of Staff.

=== Commemoration of the civilians killed ===
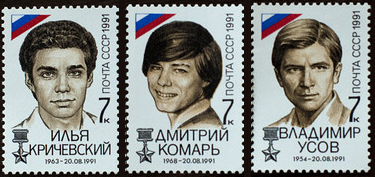
Soviet stamps commemorating (from left to right) Ilya Krichevsky, Dmitry Komar and Vladimir Usov

Thousands of people attended the funeral of Dmitry Komar, Ilya Krichevsky, and Vladimir Usov on 24 August 1991. Gorbachev posthumously made the three Heroes of the Soviet Union for their bravery in "blocking the way to those who wanted to strangle democracy.".

=== Parliamentary commission ===
In 1991, a parliamentary commission tasked with investigating causes for the attempted coup was established under Lev Ponomaryov, but was dissolved in 1992 at Ruslan Khasbulatov's insistence.

=== Mysterious deaths of the participants of the coup ===
On 24 August 1991, Sergey Akhromeyev was found dead in his office, serving as the Advisor to the president of USSR.

On 26 August, Nikolay Kruchina was found dead near his residence in the morning, having jumped from the window of his apartment a few hours prior. He served as the Managing Director of the Central Committee of the CPSU. His predecessor, Georgiy Pavlov, followed the same fate on 6 October of the same year.

On 17 October, former Deputy Head of the International Department of the Central Committee of the CPSU Dmitriy Lisovolik was found dead, having also jumped from the window of his apartment.

These deaths have faced extensive scrutiny by historians and contemporaries, who have noted the similar circumstances under which these people died.

== International reactions ==
=== Western Bloc and NATO countries ===
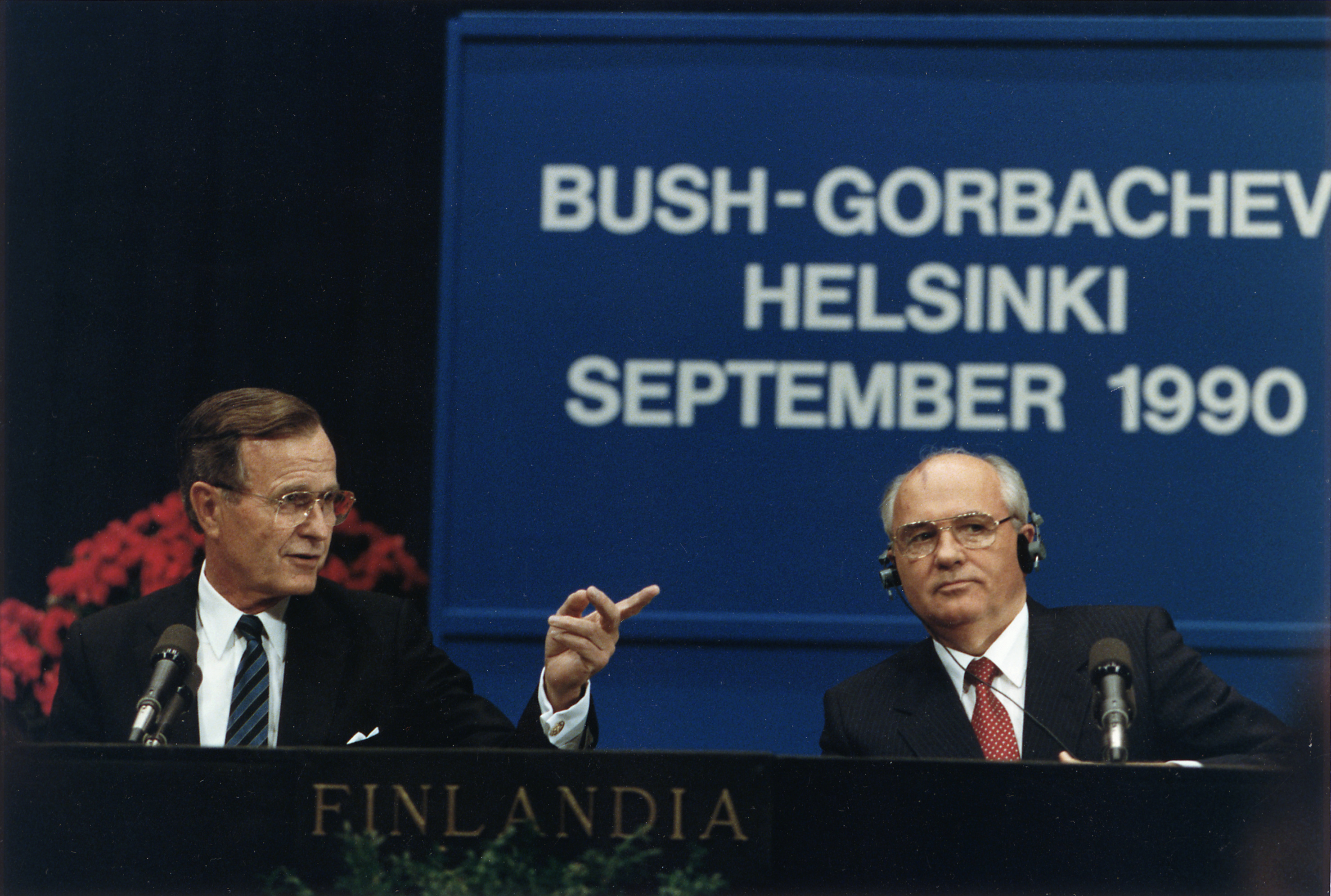
George H. W. Bush, left, is seen with Mikhail Gorbachev in 1990. Bush condemned the coup and the actions of the "Gang of Eight".

- Australia: Prime Minister of Australia Bob Hawke said that "The developments in the Soviet Union ... raise the question as to whether the purpose is to reverse the political and economic reforms which have been taking place. Australia does not want to see repression, persecution or vindictive actions against Gorbachev or those associated with him."
- Canada: Several government members quickly reacted to the coup; Prime Minister Brian Mulroney huddled with top advisers over the toppling of Mikhail Gorbachev, but officials said the Prime Minister would likely react cautiously to the stunning development. Mulroney condemned the coup and suspended food aid and other assistance to the Soviet Union. External Affairs Minister Barbara McDougall suggested on 20 August 1991 that "Canada could work with any Soviet junta that promises to carry on Gorbachev's legacy". Lloyd Axworthy and Liberal Leader Jean Chretien said Canada must join with other Western governments to back Russian President Boris Yeltsin, former Soviet Foreign Minister and Georgian President Eduard Shevardnadze and others fighting for Soviet democracy." McDougall met with the chargé d'affaires of the Soviet embassy, Vasily Sredin. As part of the NORAD defense network, the government acknowledged that any US-Soviet nuclear confrontation would directly impact Canada as well. Canadian leaders believed both the US and Canada would be treated as a single set of targets.
- Israel: Israeli officials said they hoped Gorbachev's attempted removal would not derail the 1991 Israeli-Palestinian peace conference in Madrid (co-sponsored by the US and USSR) or slow Soviet Jewish immigration. The quasi-governmental Jewish Agency, which coordinated the massive flow of Jews arriving from the Soviet Union, called an emergency meeting to assess how the coup would affect Jewish immigration. "We are closely following what is happening in the Soviet Union with concern," Foreign Minister David Levy said. "One might say that this is an internal issue of the Soviet Union, but in the Soviet Union ... everything internal has an influence for the entire world." The Soviet Union restored ties with Israel on 26 December 1991.
- Japan: Prime Minister Toshiki Kaifu ordered the Foreign Ministry to analyze developments. Kaifu himself said that it was highly likely that the coup was unconstitutional. Chief Cabinet Secretary Misoji Sakamoto said, "I strongly hope that the leadership change will not influence the positive policies of Perestroika and new-thinking diplomacy." In addition, Japanese aid and technical loans to the Soviet Union were frozen. Japan left open the question of the coup's legitimacy; government spokesman Taizo Watanabe said that "[the Soviet government has] the right to decide whether it is constitutional or unconstitutional. Japan notably differed from western states by not announcing an outright condemnation of the coup. "
- South Korea: President Roh Tae-woo welcomed the coup's collapse as a symbolic victory for the Soviet people. He said "It was a triumph of the courage and resolve of the Soviet citizens towards freedom and democracy."
- United Kingdom: Prime Minister John Major met with his cabinet on 19 August to deal with the crisis and said "There seems little doubt that President Gorbachev has been removed from power by an unconstitutional seizure of power. There are constitutional ways of removing the president of the Soviet Union; they have not been used. I believe that the whole world has a very serious stake in the events currently taking place in the Soviet Union. The reform process there is of vital importance to the world and of most vital importance of course to the Soviet people themselves and I hope that is fully clear. There is a great deal of information we don't yet have, but I would like to make clear above all that we would expect the Soviet Union to respect and honor all the commitments that President Gorbachev has made on its behalf." The British Government froze $80 million in economic aid to Moscow, while the European Community scheduled an emergency meeting to suspend a $1.5 billion aid program. In a 1991 interview, Major said he thought that "there are many reasons why [the coup] failed and a great deal of time and trouble will be spent on analysing that later. There were, I think, a number of things that were significant. I don't think it was terribly well-handled from the point of view of those organising the coup. I think the enormous and unanimous condemnation of the rest of the world publicly of the coup was of immense encouragement to the people resisting it. That is not just my view; that is the view that has been expressed to me by Mr. Shevardnadze, Mr. Yakovlev, President Yeltsin and many others as well to whom I have spoken to the last 48 hours. The moral pressure from the West and the fact that we were prepared to state unequivocally that the coup was illegal and that we wanted the legal government restored, was of immense help in the Soviet Union. I think that did play a part."
- United States: During his vacation in Walker's Point Estate in Kennebunkport, Maine, U.S. President George H. W. Bush made a blunt demand for Gorbachev's restoration to power and said the United States did not accept the legitimacy of the self-proclaimed new Soviet government. Bush rushed to the White House from his vacation home, receiving a letter from Kozyrev aboard Air Force One. He then issued a strongly-worded statement that followed a day of consultations with other Western alliance leaders amid a concerted effort to squeeze the new Soviet leadership by freezing economic aid programs. Bush decried the coup as a "misguided and illegitimate effort" that "bypasses both Soviet law and the will of the Soviet peoples." He called the overthrow "very disturbing" and put a hold on U.S. aid to the Soviet Union until the coup was ended. The Bush statement, drafted after a series of meetings with top aides, was much more forceful than the President's initial reaction that morning in Maine. It was in keeping with a Western effort to apply both diplomatic and economic pressure on the Soviet officials seeking to gain control of the country. On 2 September, the United States re-recognized the independence of Estonia, Latvia and Lithuania when Bush delivered the press conference in Kennebunkport. Secretary of State James Baker issued a statement warning "The whole world is watching. Legitimacy in 1991 flows not from the barrel of a gun but from the will of the people. History cannot be reversed. Sooner or later your effort will fail." The coup also led several members of Congress such as Sam Nunn, Les Aspin, and Richard Lugar to become concerned about the security of Soviet weapons of mass destruction and the potential for nuclear proliferation in existing unstable conditions. Despite public opposition to further aid to the Soviet Union and ambivalence from the Bush administration, they oversaw the ratification of the Soviet Nuclear Threat Reduction Act of 1991, authorizing the Nunn–Lugar Cooperative Threat Reduction Program and providing funding to post-Soviet states for the decommissioning of WMD stockpiles. Former president Ronald Reagan said:

"I can't believe that the Soviet people will allow a reversal in the progress that they have recently made toward economic and political freedom. Based on my extensive meetings and conversations with him, I am convinced that President Gorbachev had the best interest of the Soviet people in mind. I have always felt that his opposition came from the communist bureaucracy, and I can only hope that enough progress was made that a movement toward democracy will be unstoppable."

- Meanwhile, CPUSA Chairman Gus Hall supported the coup, causing division within an already shrinking party. The CPSU had broken ties with the CPUSA in 1989 over the latter's condemnation of Perestroika.
- Denmark: Foreign Minister Uffe Ellemann-Jensen said the process of change in the Soviet Union could not be reversed. In a statement, he said "So much has happened and so many people have been involved in the changes in Soviet Union that I cannot see a total reversal."
- France: President François Mitterrand called on the new Soviet rulers to guarantee the life and liberty of Gorbachev and Yeltsin, who was "Gorbachev's rival in the changing Soviet Union." Mitterrand added that "France attaches a high price to the life and liberty of Messrs. Gorbachev and Yeltsin being guaranteed by the new Moscow leaders. These will be judged by their acts, especially on the fashion in which the two high personalities in question will be treated." After the coup ended, Mitterrand was criticized for his hesitant reaction; this may have helped right wing opposition parties win the 1993 French legislative election.
- Germany: Chancellor Helmut Kohl cut his Austrian vacation short and returned to Bonn for an emergency meeting. He said he was sure Moscow would withdraw its remaining 272,000 troops from the former East Germany on schedule. Björn Engholm, leader of Germany's opposition Social Democratic Party, urged member states of the European Community "to speak with one voice" on the situation and said, "the West should not exclude the possibility of imposing economic and political sanctions on the Soviet Union to avoid a jolt to the right, in Moscow."
- Greece: Greece described the situation in the Soviet Union as "alarming". The Greek left was divided- the Alliance of the Left and former Socialist Prime Minister Andreas Papandreou issued statements condemning the coup. However, the Central Committee of the Communist Party of Greece condemned Gorbachev for dismantling the Soviet State and reestablishing Capitalism.
- Italy: Prime Minister Giulio Andreotti released a statement saying, "I'm surprised, embittered and worried. We all know the difficulties that Gorbachev encountered. But I don't know how a new president, who, at least for now, doesn't have (Gorbachev's) prestige and international connections, can overcome the obstacles." Achille Occhetto, head of the Democratic Party of the Left, the direct heir of the Italian Communist Party, called the ouster of Gorbachev "a most dramatic event of world proportions (which) will have immense repercussions on international life. I am personally and strongly struck, not only for the incalculable burden of this event, but also for the fate of comrade Gorbachev."

=== Communist states ===
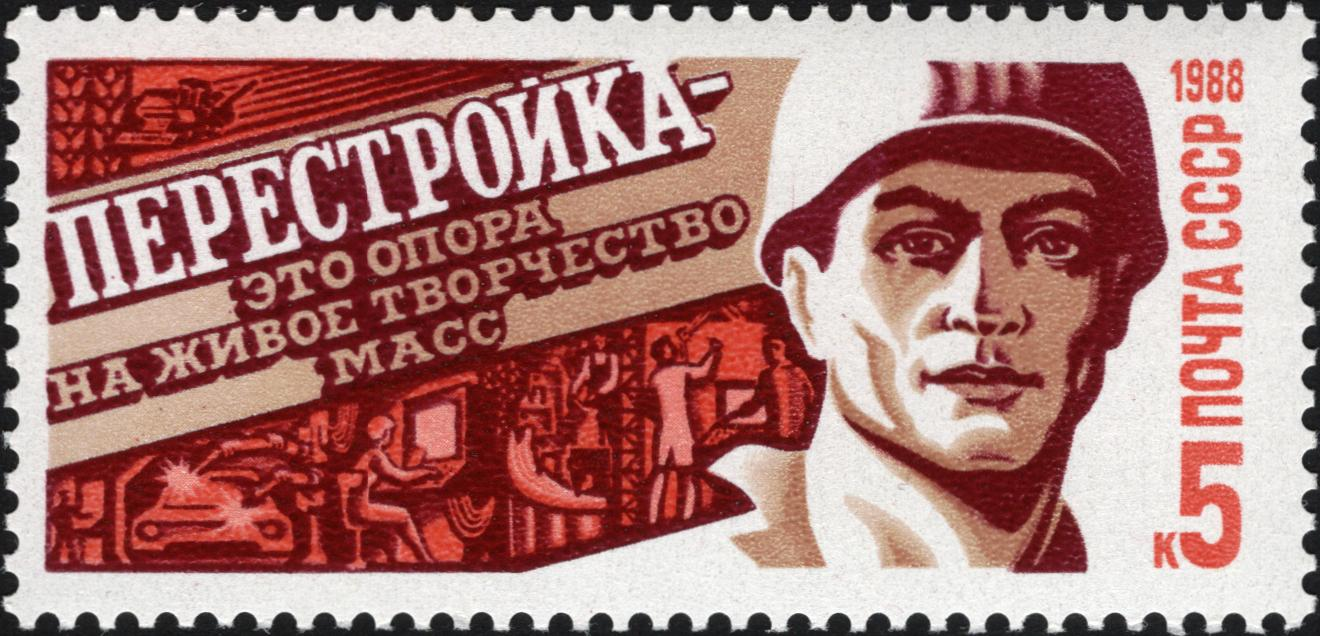
A Soviet Stamp promoting Perestroika. For some Communist States, Gorbachev's reforms resulted in a drastic cutting of Soviet Aid. The coup's failure led to the abrupt end of any remaining Russian support for its former Communist allies.

Many but not all of states still officially Marxist–Leninist (not former Warsaw Pact members that had begun transitioning to a multi-party system) had supported the coup, while others left ambivalent or unofficial support and reversed their position when the coup failed.

- Afghanistan: The failure of the coup resulted in the removal of Soviet political and military officers that favored continued aid to the People's Democratic Party government in Afghanistan. At the time, the Afghan regime was still completely dependent on the Soviet Union for its survival in the ongoing Afghan Civil War. The last Soviet military assistance arrived in October, with all Russian aid being halted by Boris Yeltsin in January 1992. Yeltsin hoped to repatriate Soviet prisoners of war still being held by the Mujahideen and was not interested in protecting a 'Soviet Legacy'. In the aftermath of the coup, Mohammad Najibullah came to resent the Soviets for abandoning him, writing to former Soviet Foreign Minister Shevardnadze "I didn't want to be president, you talked me into it, insisted on it, and promised support. Now you are throwing me and the Republic of Afghanistan to its fate." In the winter of 1992, newly independent Tajikistan, Uzbekistan and Turkmenistan provided food aid to Mohammad Najibullah's of their own accord in an attempt to save the regime, also establishing contacts with the Mujahideen. The end of Soviet weapons deliveries caused the defection of militia leader Abdul Rashid Dostum from Mohammad Najibullah to Ahmad Shah Massoud, spelling the end of the DRA in April 1992.
- Albania: During the coup, Communist Party of Labour of Albania leader Ramiz Alia was still in power, having won the 1991 Albanian parliamentary election. Encouraged by the coup's unraveling, three opposition parties demanded expedited reforms. The 1992 Albanian parliamentary election resulted in a crushing defeat for the now-democratic Socialist Party of Albania, leading to Alia's resignation as president in favor of Sali Berisha.
- Angola: In December 1991, the ruling MPLA, in its party congress changed its ideology from Marxism–Leninism to Social Democracy and committed to multi-party democracy. Angola–Russia relations became less relevant to both countries after the coup. Angola's ability to enforce its rule on some of its territories diminished due to the end of Soviet weapons deliveries and departures of Cuban personnel.
- China: The Chinese government appeared to tacitly support the coup when it issued a statement saying the move was an internal affair of the Soviet Union and when the Chinese Communist Party (CCP) released no immediate comment. Confidential Chinese documents have indicated that China's hardline leaders strongly disapproved of Gorbachev's program of political liberalization, blaming him for "the loss of Eastern Europe to capitalism." Western scholarship has alleged that Beijing had foreknowledge of the planned coup. This hypothesis is supported by two events: firstly, General Chi Haotian's Moscow visit between August 5 and August 12 to see GKChP member Dmitry Yazov, and secondly, the rapid and mostly positive coverage of the coup in Chinese media, which ignored the activities of Boris Yeltsin. When the coup began, top CCP leaders had gathered to celebrate paramount leader Deng Xiaoping's birthday. Upon hearing the news, CCP elder Bo Yibo cursed Gorbachev. Deng then said "The Soviet coup is a good thing but we must not visibly be pleased but only delighted at the bottom of our hearts." China pronounced a policy of non-interference but hoped 'stability' (i.e. a restoration of Communist rule) would return to the Soviet Union. Behind closed doors, the Chinese Politburo agreed the coup should be recognized as a 'Marxist' act and that Sino-Soviet relations should be strengthened. However, Deng also encouraged CCP General Secretary Jiang Zemin to be cautious because the coup could fail. The GKChP was also interested in resolving the Sino-Soviet split and improving diplomatic relations, dispatching Vice Foreign Affairs Minister Alexander Belonogov to Beijing to request full recognition and support. Deng met with Belonogov and asked "what do you plan to do with Gorbachev" to measure the probability of the coup's success. After hesitating for a day, China was moments away from an official declaration of support for the GKChP when news of its end arrived. After the coup failed, Gorbachev suspended exchanges with China; allegedly the coup plotters attempted to flee to China, but this was flatly denied by both governments. Several Chinese people said that a key difference between the Soviet coup leaders' failed attempts to use tanks to crush dissent in Moscow and the hardline Chinese leaders' successful use of tank-led People's Liberation Army forces during the 1989 Tiananmen Square protests and massacre was that the Soviet people had a powerful leader like Russian president Boris Yeltsin to rally around, whereas the Chinese protesters did not. The Soviet coup collapsed in three days without any major violence by the Soviet Army against civilians in June 1989, the People's Liberation Army killed thousands of people to crush the democracy movement.
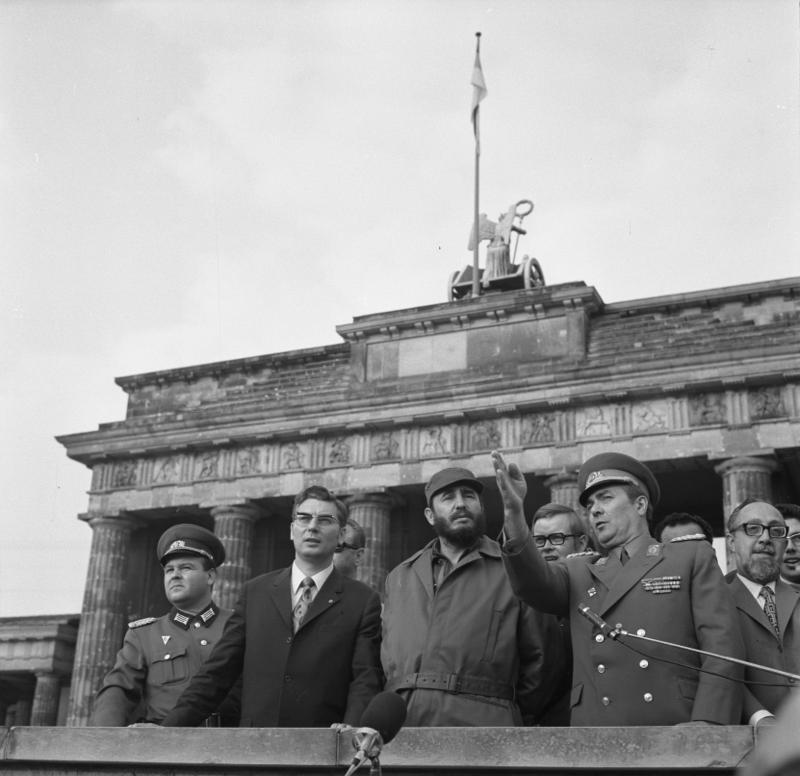
  Fidel Castro at East Berlin 1972. Cuba relied upon the Soviet Union and throughout the Cold War was a steadfast ally. Castro systemically opposed Gorbachev's perestroika but he did not publicly support the August Coup in 1991.
- Congo: Congo was already moving away from Marxism–Leninism and had organized a democratic conference in June. All references to Communism were removed from the Congolese Constitution in April 1992, yet former Soviet protégé Denis Sassou Nguesso would later regain power and rule Congo through to the present day.
- Cuba: On August 20, the Cuban Government issued a statement insisting on its neutrality, saying that the conflict was "not Cuba's to judge". In the same statement, Cuba also criticized the West for inciting divisions within the Soviet Union. A Western diplomat alleged that in private, Cuba's officials hoped the coup would succeed because the plotters would continue the special Soviet relationship with their country. In September 1991, three-quarters of Cuba's consumer goods came from the USSR, underlining the importance of Soviet events to Cuba's leaders. As the Soviet coup unfolded, Cuban officials did not believe its leaders would prevail. While Gorbachev was in power, Fidel Castro never agreed with Perestroika and in July 1991 had reiterated his position that there would be no changes in Cuba, saying "In this revolution there will be no changes of name or ideas." The end of Soviet assistance sparked the Special Period crisis that would last ten years.
- North Korea: As the coup began, newspapers published documents from the GKChP without comment or statements of support. Privately, the regime instructed its officials to support the coup to "defend Socialist achievements". North Korean diplomats were present in Moscow and kept informal contacts with Russians as events unfolded, including soldiers on the ground. By the end of the first day, North Korea's embassy in Moscow reported to Pyongyang that the coup would not succeed. At the time, there were changing attitudes in the north toward South Korea and a brief shootout at the DMZ border. After the coup's failure, Vice President Pak Song-chol said "The invincible might of our own style of socialism is being highly demonstrated," and the "North is basically stable" in a reference to Juche. Pyongyang would later blame Perestroika for the fall of the USSR, calling "Gorbachev's wrong anti-socialist policy" a "revisionist" one. The end of Soviet assistance was a direct cause of the Arduous March that began in 1994.
- Vietnam: The coup came at a time when promised Soviet aid was being slowed and later halted. Vietnamese Communists decided to not embrace a multi-party system in Vietnam due to the experience of Perestroika. An unnamed official said that "Vietnam would probably not feel sorry to see [the end of the Soviet president's career] because Gorbachev has made many mistakes... too many compromises with the West. He has also made the position and the role of the Soviet Union in the world weaker." The official also said that Vietnam would benefit from a return to Communist rule in the Soviet Union. "These changes would also affect positively Vietnam's economy because the West would carry out a hard policy towards the Soviet Union, then the latter would look for trade relations with such countries as Vietnam and China." After the coup, top Communist Party official Thai Ninh was asked by foreign press if Vietnam felt betrayed by Gorbachev and Yeltsin. He answered, "It's better to let the Soviet people decide that". The failed coup prompted Vietnam to normalize relations with China in November, ending the Sino-Vietnamese conflicts of the 1980s. In a major political victory for China, Vietnam recognized the State of Cambodia (SOC). Increasingly, Beijing and Hanoi felt an ideological affinity with one another and a mutual desire to resist American-led Peaceful Evolution. Vietnam would look to ASEAN for new trading partners in the aftermath of the Soviet dissolution.
- Yugoslavia: The Coup was a profound event for all of Yugoslavia, United Press International reported reactions from ordinary Yugoslavs including economist Dragan Radic who said "Gorbachev has done a lot for world peace and helped replace hard-line communist regimes in the past few years.Yet, the West failed to support Gorbachev financially and economically and he was forced to step down because he could not feed the Soviet people." Officially, President Slobodan Milošević, in charge of Serbia, was silent. Unofficially, there were numerous interactions between Yugoslavia and the USSR leading up to the start of the coup. The violent breakup of Yugoslavia had begun the previous year. Political actors in both nations realized the similarities of their political situations. On the anti-communist side, separatists in the USSR were building relations with Yugoslavia's breakaway republics. At the end of July, Lithuania recognized Slovenia and in August, Georgia recognized Slovenia and Croatia's independence. On the side of hardliners, both nations had factions embracing a red-brown coalition between traditional communists and ultranationalists to maintain the territorial integrity of both the USSR and Yugoslavia. In the weeks leading up to the coup, conservatives in the USSR were using the precedence of Yugoslavia as an excuse to violently suppress uprisings of non-Russians. In fact, Yugoslavia may have been a major cause for the Gang of Eight to believe their actions were necessary to prevent the USSR's collapse. When Yugoslav Prime Minister Ante Marković visited Moscow in early August, Gorbachev pointed out the parallels between problems looming in both countries. Croatian president Franjo Tuđman claimed in October that "Communist Yugoslav Generals" had openly supported the coup and that they had received instructions from Moscow. The victory of the democrats in the USSR had major implications for Yugoslavia. Yeltsin knew that Milošević had secretly supported Soviet conservatives and relations between the two were dismal. By the time the USSR collapsed, the problem of Yugoslavia had become a part of the Russian political landscape. Yeltsin and liberal elites would publicly take an even-handed approach and encourage international cooperation to solve the crisis. In contrast, post-Soviet conservatives looked to create advantages for Russia by supporting Orthodox Serbs in their struggle to control the remaining Yugoslav nations. Sociology Professor Veljko Vujačić assessed the similarities and differences between the breakup of Yugoslavia and dissolution of the Soviet Union. Both nations were multi-national Marxist–Leninist states with Slavic rulers facing major secessionist movements. In Serbia, patriotism was linked with statehood. Milošević told his nationalist followers that every generation of Serbs has had their own "Kosovo battle", dating back to the 14th century. In contrast, Russian nationalists including Aleksandr Solzhenitsyn drew a distinction between 'patriotic' Russian people and the 'oppressive' Russian state. Boris Yeltsin and his followers saw the USSR as an oppressor of Russia, thereby accelerating the mostly peaceful division of the former Soviet Union. On 27 April 1992, Yugoslavia formally disintegrated and with it vanished any mention of Marxist–Leninism in its Serbian and Montenegrin successor state.

=== Former Warsaw Pact members ===
The Warsaw Pact had dissolved in July, and its members had rapidly changed, with Marxist–Leninist pro-Soviet governments deposed or elected out of office. As a result, all criticized or expressed weary sentiments about events in Moscow. Some former Warsaw Pact members deployed armed forces to strategically important areas.

- Bulgaria: President Zhelyu Zhelev stated that "Such anti-democratic methods can never lead to anything good neither for the Soviet Union, nor for Eastern Europe, nor for the democratic developments in the world."
- Czechoslovakia: President Václav Havel warned that his nation could potentially face a "wave of refugees" crossing its border with the Ukrainian SSR. However, Havel said "It is not possible to reverse the changes that have already happened in the Soviet Union. We believe democracy will eventually prevail in the Soviet Union." Interior Ministry spokesman Martin Fendrych said an unspecified number of additional troops had been moved to reinforce the Czechoslovak border with the Soviet Union.
- Hungary: Deputy Speaker of Parliament Mátyás Szűrös said, "Undoubtedly, the Soviet economy has collapsed but this has not been the result of Gorbachev's policy but of the paralyzing influence of conservatives," adding, "Suddenly, the likelihood of a civil war in the Soviet Union has increased."
- Poland: A statement released by the president Lech Wałęsa, whose Solidarity union helped prompt the collapse of communist regimes in Eastern Europe, appealed for calm. "May unity and responsibility for our state gain the upper hand." The statement, read on Polish radio by spokesman Andrzej Drzycimski, continued, "The situation in the USSR is significant for our country. It can affect our bilateral relations. We want them to be friendly." But Wałęsa emphasized that Poland would keep its hard-won sovereignty while pursuing economic and political reforms.
- Romania: Prime Minister Petre Roman said the coup was an attempt to re-establish hardline communism in the most Stalinist manner.

=== Other sovereign states ===
- El Salvador: The end of the Salvadoran Civil War with the Communist FMLN was being negotiated. President Alfredo Cristiani voiced concern that the coup could encourage the FMLN to end negotiations, or that Cuba's relationship with the Soviet Union would be restored. Cuba had long been a supplier to the FMLN. Ernesto Altschul, Cristiani's deputy chief of staff, said, "Obviously, this can affect our situation." After the coup failed, the Chapultepec Peace Accords were signed in January 1992, ending twelve years of brutal conflict.
- India: As the coup was ongoing, Indian leaders indicated a degree of sympathy for Soviet hardliners. Prime Minister P. V. Narasimha Rao said "Mr. Gorbachev's ouster was a warning to people who favored reforms without controls." Likewise, India's ambassador in Moscow remarked that Gorbachev had "brought about the disintegration of the [Communist] party". Chief Minister of West Bengal and Communist Party of India (Marxist) cofounder Jyoti Basu wholeheartedly endorsed the coup. When the coup failed, India's government changed course, celebrating "the reassertion of democratic values and a triumph for the will of the people." Despite official support for Yeltsin's victory, Indian politicians feared that a spill-over effect from the dissolution of the Soviet Union would encourage secessionist movements at home. The loss of an economic partner and ideological friend upset the Rao Administration and India's leftist movement, as the Indian National Congress felt it shared some of the CPSU's values. The Christian Science Monitor wrote that "India feels orphaned – ideologically, strategically, economically"
- Iraq: Saddam Hussein was a close ally of the Soviet Union until Gorbachev denounced the invasion of Kuwait that preceded the Gulf War, and relations between the two countries had grown tense. One Iraqi spokesman quoted by the official Iraqi News Agency said that "Iraq's right and steadfastness was one of the main reasons behind the fall [of Gorbachev]... because [Iraq] exposed [his] policy of treason and conspiracy. It is natural that we welcome such change like the states and people who were affected by the policies of the former regime." In other words, Hussein seemingly took credit for inspiring the coup. This position was echoed by the Jordanian Newspaper Al Ra'i.
- Libya: Government radio quoted leader Muammar Gaddafi praising the coup leaders for their "brave historical action."
- Philippines: President Corazon Aquino expressed "grave concern" saying, "We hope that the progress toward world peace... achieved under the leadership of President Gorbachev will continue to be preserved and enhanced further."
- South Africa: Foreign Minister Pik Botha said, "I very much hope that [Soviet developments] will neither give rise to large-scale turbulence within the Soviet Union itself or more widely in Europe, nor jeopardize the era of hard-won international cooperation upon which the world has embarked."

=== Supranational bodies and organizations ===
- Holy See: While celebrating Mass in Budapest, Pope John Paul II said in scripted remarks that he hoped the Soviet Union's reforms would survive Gorbachev's fall. "I particularly appreciated the sincere desire that guided him and the lofty inspiration that animated him in the promotion of human rights and dignity, as well as in his commitment for the well-being of the country and of the international community. May the process initiated by him not fall into decline." The Pope also prayed for the Soviet Union itself, asking that "our prayers become even more intense to ask God that that great country may be spared further tragedy."
- NATO: The alliance held an emergency meeting in Brussels condemning the Soviet coup. "If indeed this coup did fail, it will be a great victory for the courageous Soviet people who have tasted freedom and who are not prepared to have it taken away from them," said United States Secretary of State James A. Baker III. Baker also stated, "[i]t will also, to some extent, be a victory, too, for the international community and for all those governments who reacted strongly to these events." NATO Secretary-General Manfred Wörner also said, "We should see how the situation in the Soviet Union develops. Our own plans will take into account what happens there."
- Palestine Liberation Organization: The Palestinian Liberation Organization was satisfied with the coup. Yasser Abed Rabbo, who was a member of the PLO Executive Committee, said he hoped the putsch "will permit resolution in the best interests of the Palestinians of the problem of Soviet Jews in Israel."

== Subsequent fate of GKChP Gang of Eight ==
- Gennadiy Yanayev, granted amnesty by the Russian State Duma in 1994, went on to head the Department of History and International Relations for the Russian International Academy of Tourism and died in 2010.
- Valentin Pavlov, granted amnesty by the Russian State Duma in 1994, subsequently served as a financial expert for several banks and other financial institutions and became chairman of Free Economic Society, dying in 2003.
- Vladimir Kryuchkov, granted amnesty by the Russian State Duma in 1994, died in 2007.
- Dmitriy Yazov, granted amnesty by the Russian State Duma in 1994, became adviser to the Russian Ministry of Defense and the Academy of General Staff; he died in 2020.
- Boris Pugo died from a gunshot to the head on 22 August 1991. His death was ruled as a suicide.
- Oleg Baklanov, granted amnesty by the Russian State Duma in 1994, later served as chairman of the board of directors for "Rosobshchemash"; he died in 2021.
- Vasiliy Starodubtsev, freed from arrest in 1992 due to health complications, served as deputy to the Federation Council of Russia (1993–95), governor of Tula Oblast (1997–2005), and then member of the Communist Party of the Russian Federation (since 2007) until his death in 2011.
- Alexander Tizyakov, granted amnesty by the Russian State Duma in 1994, was later a member of the Communist Party of the Russian Federation, founder of series of enterprises such as "Antal" (machine manufacturing), "Severnaya kazna" (insurance), "Vidikon" (electric arc furnace manufacturing) and "Fidelity" (fast-moving consumer goods production); he died in 2019.

== In popular media ==
- The Man Who Doesn't Return is a drama film by Sergey Snezhkin in 1991.
- Three Days (1992 film) is a drama film by Šarūnas Bartas.
- Three Days in August (1992 film) is a co-production film between Russia and the United States by Jan Jung in 1992.
- Sergey Medvedev's 2001 Channel One film Swan Lake, commissioned by the State Committee on the State of Emergency.
- Yeltsin: Three Days in August (Ельцин. Три дня в августе) is a 2011 Russian film that dramatizes the coup.
- The Event (Событие) is a 2015 Russian documentary by Sergei Loznitsa that uses footage shot 19–24 August 1991 by camera operators of the Saint Petersburg Documentary film studio to tell the story of the coup as it unfolded in Leningrad.
- Russia 1985–1999: TraumaZone is a BBC documentary television series in 2022.
- In "House Divided", a season 4 episode of For All Mankind, an alternate history TV series, the coup succeeds and Mikhail Gorbachev is overthrown.

== See also ==
- Dissolution of the Soviet Union
- History of the Soviet Union
- 1993 Russian constitutional crisis
- Wagner Group rebellion
- State collapse
- Swan Lake
- January 6 United States Capitol attack

== Bibliography ==
See also: Bibliography of the Post Stalinist Soviet Union § Dissolution of the Soviet Union and Bloc

- Bonnell, Victoria E.; Freidin, Gregory (1993). "Televorot: The Role of Television Coverage in Russia's August 1991 Coup" (PDF). Slavic Review. 52 (4): 810–838. doi:10.2307/2499653. ISSN 0037-6779. JSTOR 2499653.
- Breslauer, George W. (April 1992). "Reflections on the Anniversary of the August 1991 Coup". Soviet Economy. 8 (2): 164–174. doi:10.1080/08826994.1992.10641350. ISSN 0882-6994.
- Dunlop, John B. (2003). "The August 1991 Coup and Its Impact on Soviet Politics" (PDF). Journal of Cold War Studies. 5 (1): 94–127. doi:10.1162/152039703320996731. ISSN 1520-3972.
- Gibson, James L. (September 1997). "Mass Opposition to the Soviet Putsch of August 1991: Collective Action, Rational Choice, and Democratic Values in the Former Soviet Union". American Political Science Review. 91 (3): 671–684. doi:10.2307/2952082. ISSN 0003-0554. JSTOR 2952082.
- Hamburg, Roger (1992). "After the Abortive Soviet Coup and 'What Is To Be Done?' The Post Soviet Military". Journal of Political & Military Sociology. 20 (2): 305–322. JSTOR 45294287.
- Kyriakodis, Harry G. (1991). "The 1991 Soviet and 1917 Bolshewk Coups Compared: Causes, Consequences and Legality" (PDF). Russian History. 18 (1–4): 317–362. doi:10.1163/187633191X00137. ISSN 0094-288X.
- Lepingwell, John W. R. (July 1992). "Soviet Civil-Military Relations and the August Coup". World Politics. 44 (4): 539–572. doi:10.2307/2010487. ISSN 0043-8871. JSTOR 2010487.
- McNair, Brian (1996). "Reform and restructuring in the Soviet media before and after the August 1991 coup". In Eldridge, John; Eldridge, John Eric (eds.). Getting the message: news, truth and power. Communication and society (1. publ., repr ed.). London New York: Routledge. pp. 53–72. ISBN 978-0-415-07984-6.
- Matthee, Heinrich (1991). "A Breakdown of Civil-Military Relations: The Soviet Coup of 1991" (PDF). Scientia Militaria: South African Journal of Military Studies. 29. doi:10.5787/29-0-185. ISSN 2224-0020.
- Meyer, Stephen M. (1991). "How the Threat (and the Coup) Collapsed: The Politicization of the Soviet Military". International Security. 16 (3): 5–38. doi:10.2307/2539087. JSTOR 2539087.
- Ōgushi, Atsushi (2008). The demise of the Soviet Communist Party. BASEES/Routledge series on Russian and East European studies. London; New York: Routledge. ISBN 978-0-415-43439-3. OCLC 144769250.
- Saar, Andrus; Joe, Liivi (1992). "Polling, Under the Gun: Political Attitudes in Estonia, Surveyed at the Height of the Soviet Coup Attempt, August 1991". Public Opinion Quarterly. 56 (4): 519. doi:10.1086/269341.
- Varney, Wendy; Martin, Brian (February 2000). "Lessons from the 1991 Soviet coup". Peace Research. 32 (1): 52–68. JSTOR 23607685.
- Charles Vogt, William (December 1991). The Soviet coup of August 1991: why it happened, and why it was doomed to fail (PDF) (MA thesis). Naval Postgraduate School.
- Ziemele, Ineta (2005). State continuity and nationality: the Baltic States and Russia: past present and future as defined by international law. Leiden; Boston: M. Nijhoff. ISBN 978-90-04-14295-4. OCLC 57170584.
- Zlotnik, Marc (2003). "Yeltsin and Gorbachev: The Politics of Confrontation". Journal of Cold War Studies. 5 (1): 128–164. doi:10.1162/152039703320996740. ISSN 1520-3972.

=== Primary sources ===
- Gorbačev, Michail (1991). The August Coup: The Truth and The Lessons. New York, NY: HarperCollins Publisher. ISBN 978-0-06-016890-2. Includes transcript of the videotaped statement made 19/20 August 1991 as his Foros dacha.
- Bonnell, Victoria E.; Cooper, Ann; Freidin, Gregory, eds. (1994). Russia at the Barricades: Eyewitness Accounts of the August 1991 Coup. Armonk, NY: M.E. Sharpe. ISBN 978-1-56324-272-4. Includes the chronology of the coup, photos, and accounts from a broad cross-section of participants and eyewitnesses, including the editors.
