= Eleanor Beardsley =

American radio journalist

- Education: Univ. of South Carolina (MIB, 1991); Furman University (BA, 1986)
- Occupations: Foreign correspondent, journalist, reporter
- Years active: c. 2000–present
- Employer: National Public Radio
- Known for: Public radio news broadcasts from Paris and broader Europe
- Spouse: Ulysse Gosset
- Children: 1
- Language fluency: • English (L1: Native language) • French (L2: Second language)

Eleanor Beardsley is a journalist and correspondent based in Paris who covers French society, politics, economics, culture, history, business affairs, sport, and gastronomy for National Public Radio. She has been reporting for NPR from Paris since 2004. Over the years, however, the scope of her work has evolved and expanded beyond France, making her "a crucial part of the NPR Europe reporting team" whose broadcasts often cover key issues and events within the European Union and across Europe in general. At times Beardsley has reported on events outside of Europe, namely the pro-democracy uprisings of the 2011 Arab Spring revolution in the North African country of Tunisia, where she covered the overthrow of autocrat Zine El Abidine Ben Ali.

== Early life and education ==
Beardsley and her two younger brothers grew up in Columbia, South Carolina, where their father, Edward Henry Beardsley (1935–2023), Ph.D., was a history professor at the University of South Carolina. According to Jenny Maxwell of Columbia Metropolitan Magazine, Beardsley "could read French and speak a little," and it was at his behest that Eleanor began learning the French language around the age of 10 by reading Asterix the Gaul (French: Astérix le Gaulois) comic books in their original language. She has also cited nightly French lessons with her father as an important component of her early foundations in French. When she was 12 years old, Beardsley traveled with her parents to France for a month as a reward for her effort in studying French. This helped to instill in her a lifelong passion for the French language, culture, and people.

Beardsley continued to study French language and culture while at W. J. Keenan High School, graduating in 1982. She then went on to study it at the undergraduate level while in college.

She has a master's degree in international business from the University of South Carolina (1991) and also holds a 1986 Bachelor of Arts in European history and French from Furman University. She is bilingual, being fluent in both English and French.

== Career ==
Before landing her current job and developing her career as NPR's Paris correspondent, Beardsley held various positions across an array of sectors. She has remarked on her varied work experience, telling Columbia Metropolitan's Maxwell in 2018: "When I look at my rather unplanned life and all the different and disparate jobs I’ve had, the only constant through it all has been my interest in France and desire to speak French fluently one day." Maxwell says that Beardsley initially "did not have a deliberate plan to secure this dream job," referring to Beardsley's position with NPR.

=== Pre-2004: From politics to TV to radio ===
Early in her career, Beardsley worked for three years as a staff assistant for Senator Strom Thurmond on Capitol Hill. This gave her firsthand experience in politics that, along with her ability to speak French, led to a subsequent job as a producer at the Washington, D.C., bureau of Télévision française 1 (often shortened to TF1), which is France's oldest and most popular television network by market share. She left the network after four years, because company policy prevented anyone who was not French from working as a TF1 reporter.

It was around this time that one of her colleagues suggested she give radio a try. Open to the idea, Beardsley purchased radio broadcasting equipment and taught herself how to use it. She then began recording and producing her own radio news reports, some of which she pitched to radio programs such as The World. By the year 2000, Beardsley had begun presenting herself in professional contexts as a freelance reporter and broadcaster.

While visiting a friend in Kosovo in August of that year, Beardsley began reporting on the sociopolitical unrest that occurred there in the immediate aftermath of the Kosovo War, when Slobodan Milošević, former president of Serbia, was ousted and protesters took to the streets by the hundreds of thousands. Her on-scene, firsthand reporting of these events meant that established radio news shows, namely The World, became particularly interested in picking up Beardsley's reports. Her success in this regard soon led, in 2003, to a position as a spokesperson for the United Nations Interim Administration Mission in Kosovo.

=== Post-2004: From freelancer to foreign correspondent ===
The gradual end of the turbulence in Kosovo meant that Beardsley's work was no longer needed there (few major news outlets continued to have correspondents in Kosovo after the war). She again began writing stories on a freelance basis and pitching her reports to news outlets that included The Christian Science Monitor, The World, and Marketplace. By now, though, she had gained considerable experience and credibility as a reporter, owing in large part to her work in Kosovo, having already written front-page features in The Washington Post and The Boston Globe.

During the 2004 United States presidential election between Republican incumbent George W. Bush and Democratic challenger John Kerry, Beardsley got her big break when she interviewed Kerry's French first cousin, Brice Lalonde, then-mayor of Saint-Briac-sur-Mer in the Brittany region of northwest France. The connection between Kerry and France in this regard fascinated the French public, and because American news outlets had not reported on this story, Beardsley's interview with Lalonde was seen as exclusive reporting to the American outlets. This soon led to her position as NPR's Paris correspondent.

2022 saw Beardsley, in her capacity as a National Public Radio correspondent, regularly report on the ongoing Russian invasion of Ukraine (a continuation of the Russo-Ukrainian War that began in February 2014 with Russia's illegal annexation of the Crimean Peninsula) from on the ground inside Ukraine. Other major issues and events that she has covered over the years are listed below.

== Distinctive voice ==
Columnist Rod Dreher of The American Conservative and other commentators have remarked on how unusual it is to hear a Southern accent like Beardsley's coming from a national broadcaster. Ben Yagoda, a writer and professor of journalism and English at the University of Delaware, describes her pronunciation of words like law (a bit like "lawl") as "redolent of her native South Carolina".

== Personal life ==
In the public sphere, certain details about Beardsley's personal life remain private. She has never publicly revealed her age or birthday, for instance. She is married to French journalist and news anchor Ulysse Gosset, with whom she has a son, Maxime. They live in Paris.
