= Alexander Tizyakov =

Soviet economist and official (1926–2019)

- Александр Тизяков
- Tiyzakov in 1991

Personal details
- Born: 10 December 1926 Novoye Ivanayevo, Russian SFSR, Soviet Union
- Died: 25 January 2019 (aged 92) Yekaterinburg, Russian Federation
- Party: Communist Party of the Soviet Union (until 1991); Communist Party of the Russian Federation (from 1992)

Alexander Ivanovich Tizyakov (Russian: Александр Иванович Тизяков; 10 December 1926 – 25 January 2019) was a Soviet economist and official. He was a member of the State Committee on the State of Emergency and served as President of the Association of State Enterprises at the time of the 1991 Soviet coup d'état attempt.

== Early life and career ==
Tizyakov was born in Novoye Ivanayevo on 10 December 1926. From 1943 to 1950, he served in the Soviet Army (Note: The Soviet Army was known as the Red Army prior to 1946.) in which he participated in the Eastern Front and Soviet–Japanese War. From 1950 to 1953, he worked at Uralkhimmash as a mechanic and foreman. From 1953 to 1956, he was an instructor of the Sverdlovsk Regional Committee of the Komsomol and an organizer of the Central Committee of the Komsomol. In 1958, he graduated from the Ural Polytechnic Institute.

== Career ==
By 1956, Tizyakov was employed at the Kalinin Machine-Building Plant. There, he was a technologist, secretary of the party committee (1962-1964), deputy chief engineer (1964-1974), chief engineer (1974-1977), general director (1977-1988), and general director-supervisor (1988-1991).

Tizyakov was President of the Association of State Enterprises from 1989 to 1991. In this position, he had the powers of Deputy Head of the Government of the USSR and was Vice President of the Scientific and Industrial Union (1990-1991). He was also a deputy of the Sverdlovsk Regional Council of the 19th (1985-1987) and 20th (1987-1990) convocations.

In July 1991, Tizyakov was one of twelve other public and political figures who signed the open letter "A Word to the People". He was a member of the State Committee on the State of Emergency from 18 to 21 August 1991. After that coup had collapsed, Tizyakov was arrested. He was released on recognizance not to leave in January 1993 and granted amnesty by the Russian State Duma in 1994.

== Later life and death ==
Tizyakov co-founded Antal (engineering) and the insurance company Northern Treasury, founded Vidikon (production of chipboard) and the company Fidelity (production of consumer goods). He headed the board of directors of the investment trust company New Technologies. He was President of the Russian-Kyrgyz enterprise Technology and scientific director of Nauka-93. He was a member of the Expert Council under the Government of the Russian Federation and a member of the Technical Council under the Governor of the Sverdlovsk.

Tizyakov died on 25 January 2019 in Yekaterinburg. He is buried at Shirokorechensky Cemetery.
