= Novoye Ivanayevo =

Novoye Ivanayevo Новое Иванаево
- Village
- Location within Tatarstan Location within Russia
- Coordinates: 55°00′N 51°05′E
- Country: Russia
- Region: Tatarstan
- District: Novosheshminsky District
- Time zone: UTC+3:00

Novoye Ivanayevo (Russian: Новое Иванаево; Tatar: Яңа Иванай, Yaña İvanay) is a rural locality (a village) in Yekaterininsky Rural Settlement, Novosheshminsky District, Tatarstan, Russia. Population: 198 (2010 census); 243 (2002 census);

== Geography ==
Novoye Ivantsevo is located 9 km (5.6 mi) southwest of Novosheshminsk (the district's administrative centre) by road.

== History ==
Novoye Ivanayevo was founded in the first half of the 18th century.

== Demographics ==
Novoye Ivanayevo had a population of 243 in 2002 and 198 in 2010.
