= Angola–Russia relations =

- Angola: Russia

Russia has an embassy in Luanda. Angola has an embassy in Moscow and an honorary consulate in Saint Petersburg. Angola and the precursor to Russia, the Soviet Union, established relations upon Angola's independence.

== Angolan–Soviet relations ==
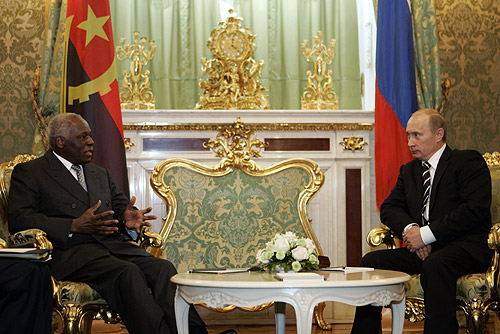
Vladimir Putin with Jose Eduardo dos Santos in 2006.

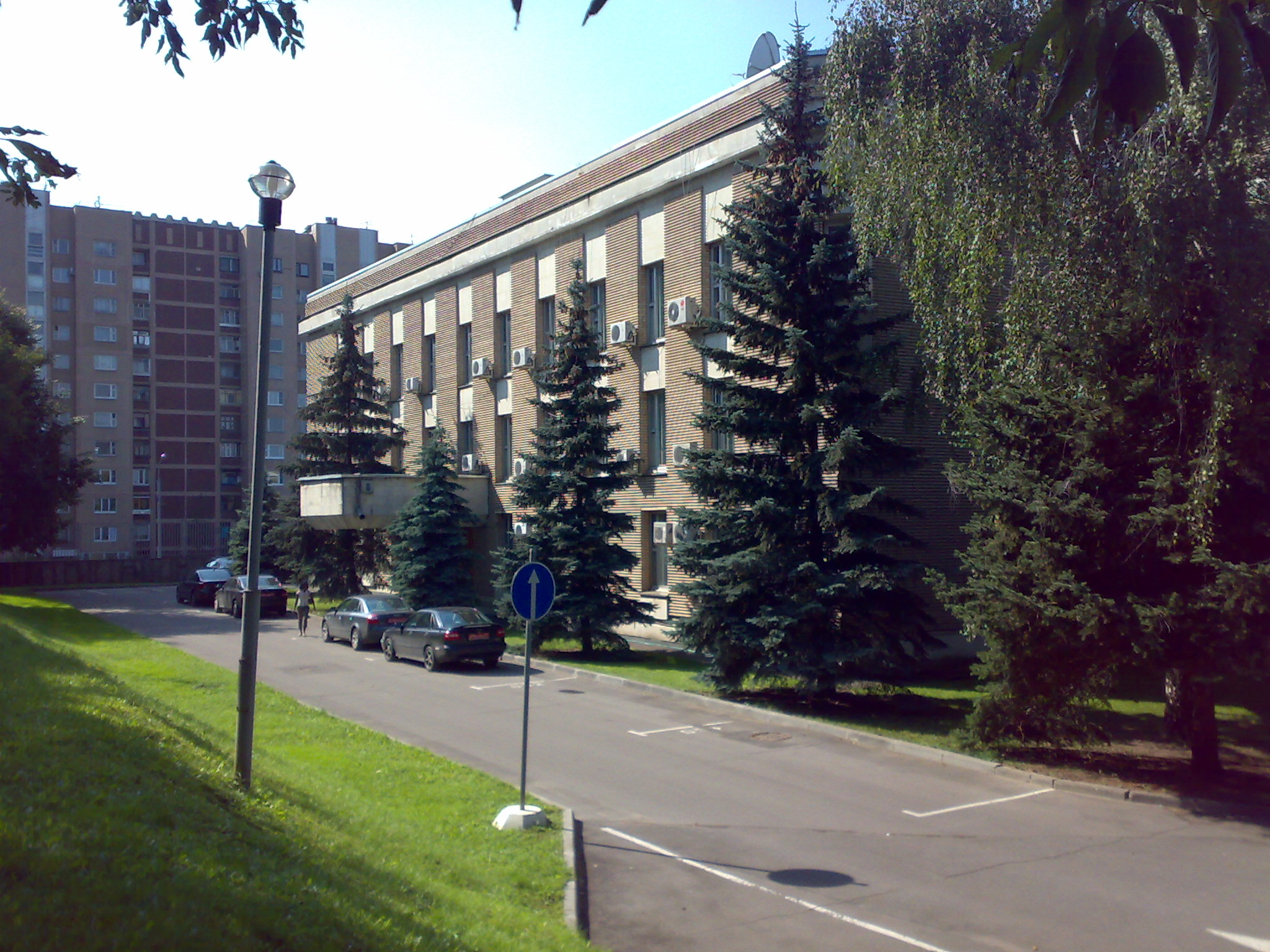
Embassy of Angola in Moscow

Soviet–Angolan relations were strained at times during the 1980s, in part because Angola sought to upgrade diplomatic ties with the United States. Soviet leadership factions were divided over their nation's future role in Africa, and some Soviet negotiators objected to Angolan President José Eduardo dos Santos's concessions to the United States on the issue of "linkage". The region's intractable political problems, and the cost of maintaining Cuban troop support and equipping the MPLA-PT, weakened the Soviet commitment to the building of a Marxist-Leninist state in Angola.

Angolan leaders, in turn, complained about Soviet neglect—low levels of assistance, poor-quality personnel and matériel, and inadequate responses to complaints. Angola shared the cost of the Cuban military presence and sought to reduce these expenses, in part because many Angolan citizens felt the immediate drain on economic resources and rising tensions in areas occupied by Cuban troops. Moreover, dos Santos complained that the Soviet Union dealt with Angola opportunistically—purchasing Angolan coffee at low prices and re-exporting it at a substantial profit, overfishing in Angolan waters, and driving up local food prices.

Angola condemned Russia regarding the Russian invasion of Ukraine.

== Economic relations ==
Compared to the Soviet era, trade between Russia and Angola is now quite minimal. In 2016, exports from Russia to Angola amounted to US$567.9 million and Angolan exports to Russia amounted to just US$14,942.

During 2017 to 2021, exports from Russia to Angola were much lower with US$184m in 2021, imports from Angola were US$425,380 during 2021.
