= Ulysse Gosset =

French journalist, news anchor and television presenter

- Born: 23 July 1955 (age 70); Paris, France
- Education: École supérieure de journalisme de Lille
- Occupations: Journalist, news anchor Editorialist
- Television: France 3 (2003–05); France 24 (2005–08); BFM TV (2012–)

Ulysse Gosset (born 23 July 1955) is a French journalist, news anchor, and television presenter.

== Life and career ==
Ulysse Gosset graduated with a journalism degree at the École supérieure de journalisme de Lille. He worked for TF1, France Télévisions, France 3, LCI, France 24, the French channel for international news, and Radio France. He was for many years a permanent reporter for TF1 and Radio France in Tokyo, Moscow and Washington. Between December 2003 and August 2005, he was the France 3 national editor.

He is one of the creators of the French international news channel France 24 in 2005, and was the news director of the channel until August 2006. Since the end of that year, he presented every Friday a talk show on international politics titled Le Talk de Paris where he received several heads of state and government. In November 2008, the new direction of France 24 announced that his contract is not renewed. The reason of the eviction, stated by several medias, would have been of an interview in Talk de Paris with Bernard Kouchner, at that time the French Minister of Foreign Affairs, who took very bad the questions of the journalist and then complained at the direction of France 24.

In April 2012, Ulysse Gosset joined the news channel BFM TV, the first news channel in France, as an editorialist in charge of the international questions and a journalist specialized in foreign politics.

Ulysse Gosset received the Grand Prix de la Presse Internationale 2013 for the excellence of his analysis in international news and for his exemplary career.
