= 23rd Congress of the Communist Party of the Soviet Union =

1966 meeting of Soviet delegates

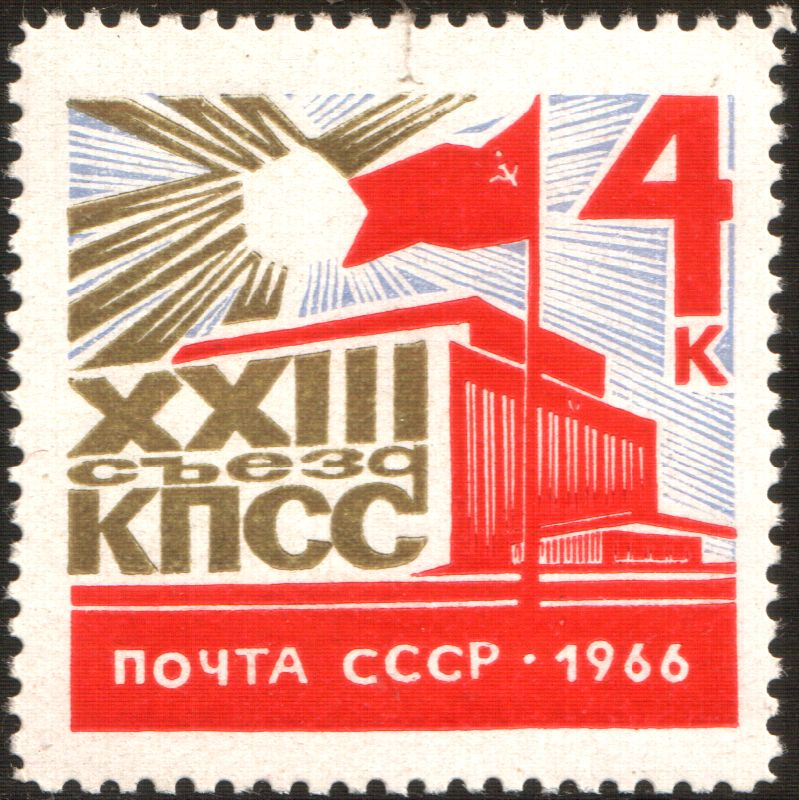
1966 USSR Postal Stamp, celebrating the 23rd Congress

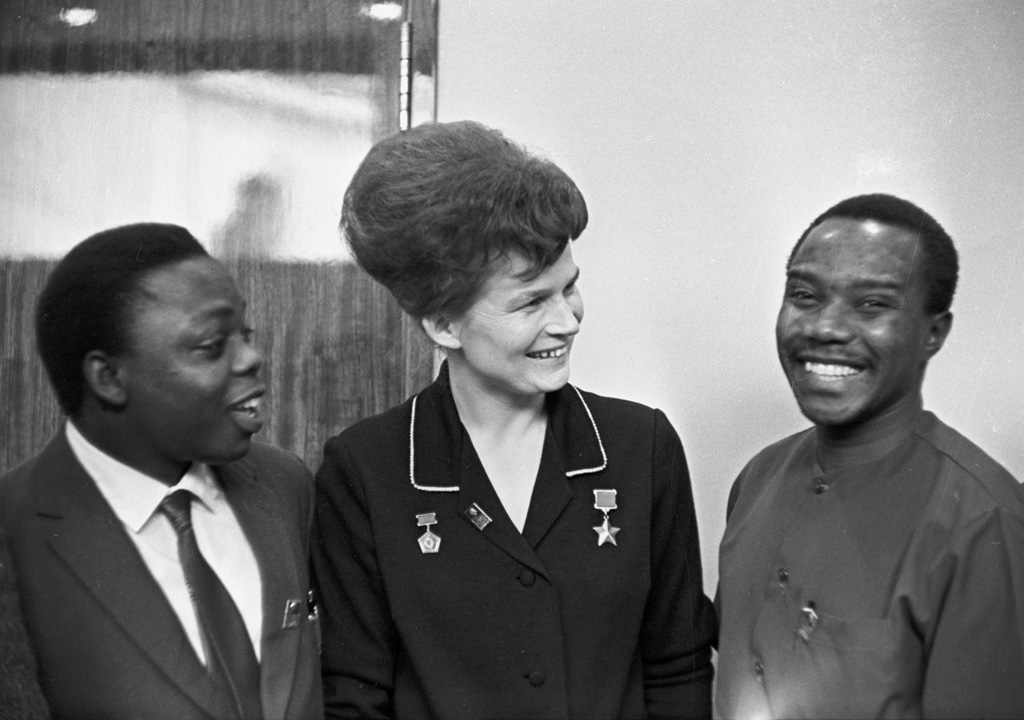
Valentina Tereshkova with African delegates at the 23rd CPSU Congress

The 23rd Congress of the Communist Party of the Soviet Union (CPSU) took place in Moscow, RSFSR between 29 March and 8 April 1966. It was the first Congress during Leonid Brezhnev's leadership of the Party and state. The position of First Secretary (held by Brezhnev) was renamed back to General Secretary, which had been its name from 1922 to 1952. The congress elected the 23rd Central Committee.

Leonid Brezhnev, Gennady Voronov, Andrei Kirilenko, Alexei Kosygin, Kirill Mazurov, Arvid Pelshe, Nikolai Podgorny, Dmitry Polyansky, Mikhail Suslov, Alexander Shelepin and Petro Shelest were elected full members of the 23rd Politburo, while Viktor Grishin, Pyotr Demichev, Dinmukhamed Konayev, Pyotr Masherov, Vasil Mzhavanadze, Sharof Rashidov, Dmitriy Ustinov and Volodymyr Shcherbytsky were elected candidate members.

On 4 April, the Soviet probe Luna 10, the first spacecraft to orbit the Moon, was planned to broadcast the notes of The Internationale to the Congress. However due to a missing note a tape recording was used instead.

== See also ==
- Congress of the Communist Party of the Soviet Union
