= Presidium of the 20th Congress of the Communist Party of the Soviet Union =

20th Presidium
- 19th Presidium ← → 22nd Presidium
- Duration: 27 February 1956 – 31 October 1961

The Presidium of the 20th Congress of the Communist Party of the Soviet Union (CPSU) was in session from 1956 to 1961.

== Composition ==
=== Members ===
Members of the Presidium of the 20th Congress of the Communist Party of the Soviet Union
Name	Cyrillic	19th PRE	22nd PRE	Birth	Death	PM	Ethnicity	Gender
Averky Aristov	Аверкий Аристов	New	Not	1903	1973	1921	Belarusian	Male
Nikolai Belyaev	Никола́й Беля́ев	New	Relieved	1903	1966	1925	Russian	Male
Leonid Brezhnev	Леонид Брежнев	Promoted	Reelected	1906	1982	1931	Russian	Male
Nikolai Bulganin	Николай Булганин	Old	Relieved	1895	1975	1917	Russian	Male
Yekaterina Furtseva	Екатерина Фурцева	Promoted	Not	1910	1974	1930	Russian	Female
Nikolai Ignatov	Никола́й Игна́тов	New	Not	1901	1966	1924	Russian	Male
Lazar Kaganovich	Лазарь Каганович	Old	Relieved	1893	1991	1911	Ukrainian Jew	Male
Nikita Khrushchev	Никита Хрущёв	Old	Reelected	1894	1971	1918	Russian	Male
Aleksey Kirichenko	Алексе́й Кириче́нко	Old	Relieved	1908	1975	1930	Ukrainian	Male
Alexei Kosygin	Алексей Косыгин	Promoted	Reelected	1904	1980	1927	Russian	Male
Frol Kozlov	Фрол Козлов	Promoted	Reelected	1908	1965	1926	Russian	Male
Otto Kuusinen	Отто Куусинен	Old	Reelected	1881	1964	1918	Finn	Male
Georgy Malenkov	Георгий Маленков	Old	Relieved	1902	1988	1920	Russian	Male
Anastas Mikoyan	Василий Мжаванадзе	Old	Reelected	1895	1978	1915	Armenian	Male
Vyacheslav Molotov	Вячеслав Молотов	Old	Relieved	1890	1986	1906	Russian	Male
Nuritdin Mukhitdinov	Нуритди́н Мухитди́нов	Old	Not	1917	2008	1942	Uzbek	Male
Mikhail Pervukhin	Михаил Первухин	Old	Demoted	1904	1978	1919	Russian	Male
Nikolai Podgorny	Никола́й Подго́рный	Promoted	Reelected	1903	1983	1930	Ukrainian	Male
Dmitry Polyansky	Дми́трий Поля́нский	Promoted	Reelected	1917	2001	1939	Ukrainian	Male
Maksim Saburov	Макси́м Сабу́ров	Old	Relieved	1900	1977	1920	Russian	Male
Nikolai Shvernik	Никола́й Шве́рник	Promoted	Reelected	1888	1970	1905	Russian	Male
Mikhail Suslov	Михаил Суслов	Old	Reelected	1902	1982	1921	Russian	Male
Kliment Voroshilov	Климент Ворошилов	Old	Relieved	1881	1969	1903	Russian	Male
Georgy Zhukov	Георгий Жуков	Promoted	Relieved	1896	1974	1919	Russian	Male

=== Candidates ===
Candidate Members of the Presidium of the 20th Congress of the Communist Party of the Soviet Union
Name	Cyrillic	19th PRE	22nd PRE	Birth	Death	PM	Ethnicity	Gender
Leonid Brezhnev	Леонид Брежнев	New	Promoted	1906	1982	1931	Russian	Male
Yekaterina Furtseva	Екатерина Фурцева	New	Promoted	1910	1974	1930	Russian	Female
Viktor Grishin	Ви́ктор Гри́шин	By-election	Candidate	1914	1992	1939	Russian	Male
Jānis Kalnbērziņš	Ян Калнбе́рзинь	By-election	Not	1893	1986	1917	Latvian	Male
Andrei Kirilenko	Андре́й Кириле́нко	By-election	Not	1906	1990	1930	Ukrainian	Male
Demyan Korotchenko	Демьян Коротченко	By-election	Not	1894	1969	1918	Ukrainian	Male
Alexei Kosygin	Алексей Косыгин	New	Promoted	1904	1980	1927	Russian	Male
Frol Kozlov	Фрол Козлов	By-election	Promoted	1908	1965	1926	Russian	Male
Kirill Mazurov	Кири́лл Ма́зуров	By-election	Candidate	1914	1989	1940	Belarusian	Male
Nuritdin Mukhitdinov	Нуритди́н Мухитди́нов	New	Promoted	1917	2008	1942	Uzbek	Male
Vasil Mzhavanadze	Василий Мжаванадзе	By-election	Candidate	1902	1988	1927	Georgian	Male
Mikhail Pervukhin	Михаил Первухин	Demoted	Not	1904	1978	1919	Russian	Male
Nikolai Podgorny	Никола́й Подго́рный	By-election	Promoted	1903	1983	1930	Ukrainian	Male
Dmitry Polyansky	Дми́трий Поля́нский	By-election	Promoted	1917	2001	1939	Ukrainian	Male
Pyotr Pospelov	Пётр Поспелов	By-election	Not	1898	1979	1916	Russian	Male
Dmitri Shepilov	Дми́трий Шепи́лов	New	Not	1905	1995	1926	Russian	Male
Nikolai Shvernik	Никола́й Шве́рник	Candidate	Promoted	1888	1970	1905	Russian	Male
Gennady Voronov	Геннадий Воронов	By-election	Member	1910	1994	1931	Russian	Male
Georgy Zhukov	Георгий Жуков	New	Promoted	1896	1974	1919	Russian	Male
