= Politburo of the 23rd Congress of the Communist Party of the Soviet Union =

23rd Politburo
- 22nd Presidium ← → 24th Politburo
- Duration: 8 April 1966 – 9 April 1971

The Politburo of the 23rd Congress of the Communist Party of the Soviet Union was in session from 1966 to 1971.

The 23rd Congress, the first such event since Nikita Khrushchev's ousting, the Presidium reverted to its previous name; Politburo. Mikoyan and Nikolai Shvernik, the two oldest members, were not reelected to the Presidium, while Arvīds Pelše became the only Presidium débutant. While Brezhnev may have been General Secretary, he did not have a majority in the Presidium; when Kosygin and Podgorny agreed on policy, which was not often the case, Brezhnev found himself in the minority. Brezhnev could only count on three to four votes in the Presidium: Suslov, who often switched sides, Kirilenko, Pelše and Dmitry Polyansky. Brezhnev and Kosygin often disagreed on policy; Brezhnev was a conservative while Kosygin was a modest reformer. Kosygin, who had begun his premiership as Brezhnev's equal, lost much power and influence within the Presidium when he introduced the 1965–1971 Soviet economic reform. After the reshuffling process of the Presidium ended in mid-to-late 1970, the Soviet leadership evolved into a gerontocracy, a form of rule in which the rulers are significantly older than most of the adult population; this meant that fewer up-and-comers were promoted to top party positions.

== Composition ==
=== Members ===
Members of the Political Bureau of the 23rd Congress of the Communist Party of the Soviet Union
Name	Cyrillic	22nd PRE	24th POL	Birth	Death	PM	Ethnicity	Offices held
Leonid Brezhnev	Леонид Брежнев	Old	Reelected	1906	1982	1931	Russian	Two: Party office; General Secretary, Central Committee of the CPSU; State office; Chairman, Defence Council of the USSR
Andrei Kirilenko	Андре́й Кириле́нко	Old	Reelected	1906	1990	1930	Russian	One: Party office; Secretary, Central Committee of the CPSU
Alexei Kosygin	Алексей Косыгин	Old	Reelected	1904	1980	1927	Russian	One: State office; Chairman, Council of Ministers of the USSR
Kirill Mazurov	Кири́лл Ма́зуров	Old	Reelected	1914	1989	1940	Belarusian	One: State office; First Deputy Chairman, Council of Ministers of the USSR
Arvīds Pelše	А́рвид Пе́льше	New	Reelected	1899	1983	1915	Latvian	One: Party office; Chairman, Party Control Committee of the Central Committee
Nikolai Podgorny	Никола́й Подго́рный	Old	Reelected	1903	1983	1930	Ukrainian	One: State office; Chairman, Presidium of the Supreme Soviet of the USSR
Dmitry Polyansky	Дми́трий Поля́нский	Old	Reelected	1917	2001	1939	Ukrainian	One: State office; First Deputy Chairman, Council of Ministers of the USSR
Alexander Shelepin	Алекса́ндр Шеле́пин	Old	Reelected	1918	1994	1940	Russian	Two: Party office; Secretary, Central Committee of the CPSU (until 1967); Organisational office; Chairman, Presidium of the All-Union Central Council of Trade Unions (from 1967)
Petro Shelest	Петро Шелест	Old	Reelected	1908	1996	1928	Ukrainian	One: Party office; First Secretary, Central Committee of the Communist Party of Ukraine
Mikhail Suslov	Михаил Суслов	Old	Reelected	1902	1982	1921	Russian	One: Party office; Second Secretary, Central Committee of the CPSU
Gennady Voronov	Геннадий Воронов	Old	Reelected	1910	1994	1931	Russian	One: State office; Chairman, Council of Ministers of the Russian SFSR

=== Candidates ===
Candidate Members of the Political Bureau of the 23rd Congress of the Communist Party of the Soviet Union
Name	Cyrillic	22nd PRE	24th POL	Birth	Death	PM	Ethnicity	Offices held
Yuri Andropov	Юрий Андропов	By-election	Candidate	1914	1984	1939	Russian	One: State office; Chairman, Committee for State Security (KGB) (from 1967)
Pyotr Demichev	Пётр Де́мичев	Candidate	Candidate	1917	2010	1939	Russian	One: Party office; Secretary, Central Committee of the CPSU
Viktor Grishin	Ви́ктор Гри́шин	Candidate	Member	1914	1992	1939	Russian	Two: Organisational office; Chairman, Presidium of the All-Union Central Council of Trade Unions (until 1967); Party office; First Secretary, Moscow City Committee of the CPSU (from 1967)
Dinmukhamed Kunaev	Дінмұхаммед Қонаев	New	Member	1912	1993	1939	Kazakh	One: Party office; First Secretary, Central Committee of the Communist Party of Kazakhstan
Pyotr Masherov	Пётр Машеров	New	Candidate	1918	1980	1943	Belarusian	One: Party office; First Secretary, Central Committee of the Communist Party of Byelorussia
Vasil Mzhavanadze	Василий Мжаванадзе	Candidate	Candidate	1902	1988	1927	Georgian	One: Party office; First Secretary, Central Committee of the Communist Party of Georgia
Sharof Rashidov	Шараф Рашидов	Candidate	Candidate	1917	1983	1939	Uzbek	One: Party office; First Secretary, Central Committee of the Communist Party of Uzbekistan
Volodymyr Shcherbytsky	Влади́мир Щерби́цкий	Candidate	Member	1918	1990	1948	Ukrainian	One: State office; Chairman, Council of Ministers of the Ukrainian SSR
Dmitry Ustinov	Дми́трий Усти́нов	Candidate	Candidate	1908	1984	1927	Russian	One: Party office; Secretary, Central Committee of the CPSU
