= Politburo of the 24th Congress of the Communist Party of the Soviet Union =

List of Soviet congressional members

24th Politburo
- 23rd Politburo ← → 25th Politburo
- Duration: 9 April 1971 – 5 March 1976

The Politburo of the 24th Congress of the Communist Party of the Soviet Union was in session from 1971 to 1976.

== Composition ==
=== Members ===
Members of the Political Bureau of the 24th Congress of the Communist Party of the Soviet Union
Name	Cyrillic	23rd POL	25th POL	Birth	Death	PM	Ethnicity	Offices held
Yuri Andropov	Юрий Андропов	Promoted	Reelected	1914	1984	1939	Russian	One: State office; Chairman, Committee for State Security (KGB)
Leonid Brezhnev	Леонид Брежнев	Old	Reelected	1906	1982	1931	Russian	Two: Party office; General Secretary, Central Committee of the CPSU; State office; Chairman, Defence Council of the USSR
Andrei Grechko	Андре́й Гре́чко	By-election	Reelected	1903	1976	1928	Ukrainian	One: State office; Minister of Defence of the USSR
Viktor Grishin	Ви́ктор Гри́шин	Candidate	Reelected	1914	1992	1939	Russian	One: Party office; First Secretary, Moscow City Committee of the CPSU
Andrei Gromyko	Андрей Громыко	By-election	Reelected	1909	1989	1931	Belarusian	One: State office; Minister of Foreign Affairs of the USSR
Andrei Kirilenko	Андре́й Кириле́нко	Old	Reelected	1906	1990	1930	Ukrainian	One: Party office; Secretary, Central Committee of the CPSU
Alexei Kosygin	Алексей Косыгин	Old	Reelected	1904	1980	1927	Russian	One: State office; Chairman, Council of Ministers of the USSR
Fyodor Kulakov	Фёдор Кулаков	New	Reelected	1918	1978	1940	Russian	Two: Party offices; Secretary, Central Committee of the CPSU; Head, Agriculture Department of the Central Committee
Dinmukhamed Kunaev	Дінмұхаммед Қонаев	Candidate	Reelected	1912	1993	1939	Kazakh	One: Party office; First Secretary, Central Committee of the Communist Party of Kazakhstan
Kirill Mazurov	Кири́лл Ма́зуров	Old	Reelected	1914	1989	1940	Belarusian	One: State office; First Deputy Chairman, Council of Ministers of the USSR
Arvīds Pelše	А́рвид Пе́льше	Old	Reelected	1899	1983	1915	Latvian	One: Party office; Chairman, Party Control Committee of the Central Committee
Nikolai Podgorny	Никола́й Подго́рный	Old	Reelected	1903	1983	1930	Ukrainian	One: State office; Chairman, Presidium of the Supreme Soviet of the USSR
Dmitry Polyansky	Дми́трий Поля́нский	Old	Not	1917	2001	1939	Ukrainian	Two: State offices; First Deputy Chairman, Council of Ministers of the USSR (until 1973); Minister of Agriculture of the USSR (from 1973)
Volodymyr Shcherbytsky	Влади́мир Щерби́цкий	Candidate	Reelected	1918	1990	1948	Ukrainian	Two: State office; Chairman, Council of Ministers of the Ukrainian SSR (until 1972); Party office; First Secretary, Central Committee of the Communist Party of Ukraine (from 1972)
Alexander Shelepin	Алекса́ндр Шеле́пин	Old	Relieved	1918	1994	1940	Russian	One: Organisational office; Chairman, Presidium of the All-Union Central Council of Trade Unions (until 1975)
Petro Shelest	Петро Шелест	Old	Relieved	1908	1996	1928	Ukrainian	Two: Party office; First Secretary, Central Committee of the Communist Party of Ukraine (until 1972); State office; Deputy Chairman, Council of Ministers of the USSR (1972–1973)
Mikhail Suslov	Михаил Суслов	Old	Reelected	1902	1982	1921	Russian	One: Party office; Second Secretary, Central Committee of the CPSU
Gennady Voronov	Геннадий Воронов	Old	Relieved	1910	1994	1931	Russian	Two: State offices; Chairman, Council of Ministers of the Russian SFSR (until July 1971); Chairman, Committee of People's Control of the USSR (1971–1973)

=== Candidates ===
Candidate Members of the Political Bureau of the 24th Congress of the Communist Party of the Soviet Union
Name	Cyrillic	23rd POL	25th POL	Birth	Death	PM	Ethnicity	Offices held
Yuri Andropov	Юрий Андропов	Candidate	Promoted	1914	1984	1939	Russian	One: State office; Chairman, Committee for State Security (KGB)
Pyotr Demichev	Пётр Де́мичев	Candidate	Candidate	1917	2010	1939	Russian	Two: Party office; Secretary, Central Committee of the CPSU (until 1974); State office; Minister of Culture of the USSR (from 1974)
Pyotr Masherov	Пётр Машеров	Candidate	Candidate	1918	1980	1943	Belarusian	One: Party office; First Secretary, Central Committee of the Communist Party of Byelorussia
Vasil Mzhavanadze	Василий Мжаванадзе	Candidate	Relieved	1902	1988	1927	Georgian	One: Party office; First Secretary, Central Committee of the Communist Party of Georgia (until 1972)
Boris Ponomarev	Борис Пономарёв	By-election	Candidate	1905	1995	1919	Russian	Two: Party offices; Secretary, Central Committee of the CPSU; Head, International Department of the Central Committee
Sharof Rashidov	Шараф Рашидов	Candidate	Candidate	1917	1983	1939	Uzbek	One: Party office; First Secretary, Central Committee of the Communist Party of Uzbekistan
Grigory Romanov	Григорий Романов	By-election	Member	1923	2008	1944	Russian	One: Party office; First Secretary, Leningrad Regional Committee of the CPSU
Mikhail Solomentsev	Михаи́л Соло́менцев	By-election	Candidate	1913	2008	1940	Russian	One: State office; Chairman, Council of Ministers of the Russian SFSR (from July 1971)
Dmitry Ustinov	Дми́трий Усти́нов	Candidate	Member	1908	1984	1927	Russian	One: Party office; Secretary, Central Committee of the CPSU
