= Politburo of the 25th Congress of the Communist Party of the Soviet Union =

25th Politburo
- 24th Politburo ← → 26th Politburo
- Duration: 5 March 1976 – 3 March 1981

The Politburo of the 25th Congress of the Communist Party of the Soviet Union was in session from 1976 to 1981.

== Composition ==
=== Members ===
Members of the Political Bureau of the 25th Congress of the Communist Party of the Soviet Union
Name	Cyrillic	24th POL	26th POL	Birth	Death	PM	Ethnicity	Offices held
Yuri Andropov	Юрий Андропов	Old	Reelected	1914	1984	1939	Russian	One: State office; Chairman, Committee for State Security (KGB)
Leonid Brezhnev	Леонид Брежнев	Old	Reelected	1906	1982	1931	Russian	Three: Party office; General Secretary, Central Committee of the CPSU; State offices; Chairman, Defence Council of the USSR; Chairman, Presidium of the Supreme Soviet of the USSR (from 1977)
Konstantin Chernenko	Константин Черненко	Promoted	Reelected	1911	1985	1931	Ukrainian	Two: Party offices; Secretary, Central Committee of the CPSU; Head, General Department of the Central Committee
Mikhail Gorbachev	Михаил Горбачёв	Promoted	Reelected	1931	2022	1952	Russian	One: Party office; Secretary, Central Committee of the CPSU
Andrei Grechko	Андре́й Гре́чко	Old	Died	1903	1976	1928	Ukrainian	One: State office; Minister of Defence of the USSR (until April 1976)
Viktor Grishin	Ви́ктор Гри́шин	Old	Reelected	1914	1992	1939	Russian	One: Party office; First Secretary, Moscow City Committee of the CPSU
Andrei Gromyko	Андрей Громыко	Old	Reelected	1909	1989	1931	Belarusian	One: State office; Minister of Foreign Affairs of the USSR
Andrei Kirilenko	Андре́й Кириле́нко	Old	Reelected	1906	1990	1930	Ukrainian	One: Party office; Secretary, Central Committee of the CPSU
Alexei Kosygin	Алексей Косыгин	Old	Relieved	1904	1980	1927	Russian	One: State office; Chairman, Council of Ministers of the USSR (until 1980)
Fyodor Kulakov	Фёдор Кулаков	Old	Died	1918	1978	1940	Russian	Two: Party offices; Secretary, Central Committee of the CPSU (until 1978); Head, Agriculture Department of the Central Committee (until May 1976)
Dinmukhamed Kunaev	Дінмұхаммед Қонаев	Old	Reelected	1912	1993	1939	Kazakh	One: Party office; First Secretary, Central Committee of the Communist Party of Kazakhstan
Kirill Mazurov	Кири́лл Ма́зуров	Old	Relieved	1914	1989	1940	Belarusian	One: State office; First Deputy Chairman, Council of Ministers of the USSR (until 1978)
Arvīds Pelše	А́рвид Пе́льше	Old	Reelected	1899	1983	1915	Latvian	One: Party office; Chairman, Party Control Committee of the Central Committee
Nikolai Podgorny	Никола́й Подго́рный	Old	Relieved	1903	1983	1930	Ukrainian	One: State office; Chairman, Presidium of the Supreme Soviet of the USSR (until 1977)
Grigory Romanov	Григорий Романов	Candidate	Reelected	1923	2008	1944	Russian	One: Party office; First Secretary, Leningrad Regional Committee of the CPSU
Volodymyr Shcherbytsky	Влади́мир Щерби́цкий	Old	Reelected	1918	1990	1948	Ukrainian	One: Party office; First Secretary, Central Committee of the Communist Party of Ukraine
Mikhail Suslov	Михаил Суслов	Old	Reelected	1902	1982	1921	Russian	One: Party office; Second Secretary, Central Committee of the CPSU
Nikolai Tikhonov	Николай Тихонов	Promoted	Reelected	1905	1997	1940	Russian	Two: State offices; First Deputy Chairman, Council of Ministers of the USSR (until 1980); Chairman, Council of Ministers of the USSR (from 1980)
Dmitry Ustinov	Дми́трий Усти́нов	Candidate	Reelected	1908	1984	1927	Russian	Two: Party office; Secretary, Central Committee of the CPSU (until October 1976); State office; Minister of Defence of the USSR (from April 1976)

=== Candidates ===
Candidate Members of the Political Bureau of the 25th Congress of the Communist Party of the Soviet Union
Name	Cyrillic	24th POL	26th POL	Birth	Death	PM	Ethnicity	Offices held
Heydar Aliyev	Гейда́р Али́ев	New	Candidate	1923	2003	1945	Azerbaijani	One: Party office; First Secretary, Central Committee of the Communist Party of Azerbaijan
Konstantin Chernenko	Константин Черненко	By-election	Promoted	1911	1985	1931	Ukrainian	Two: Party offices; Secretary, Central Committee of the CPSU; Head, General Department of the Central Committee
Pyotr Demichev	Пётр Де́мичев	Candidate	Candidate	1917	2010	1939	Russian	One: State office; Minister of Culture of the USSR
Mikhail Gorbachev	Михаил Горбачёв	New	Promoted	1931	2022	1952	Russian	Two: Party offices; First Secretary, Stavropol Regional Committee of the CPSU (until 1978); Secretary, Central Committee of the CPSU (from 1978)
Tikhon Kiselyov	Ти́хон Киселёв	By-election	Candidate	1917	1983	1940	Belarusian	One: Party office; First Secretary, Central Committee of the Communist Party of Byelorussia (from 1980)
Vasily Kuznetsov	Василий Кузнецов	By-election	Candidate	1901	1990	1927	Russian	Two: State offices; First Deputy Minister of Foreign Affairs of the USSR (until 7 October 1977); First Deputy Chairman, Presidium of the Supreme Soviet of the USSR (from 7 October 1977)
Pyotr Masherov	Пётр Машеров	Candidate	Died	1918	1980	1943	Belarusian	One: Party office; First Secretary, Central Committee of the Communist Party of Byelorussia (until 1980)
Boris Ponomarev	Борис Пономарёв	Candidate	Candidate	1905	1995	1919	Russian	Two: Party offices; Secretary, Central Committee of the CPSU; Head, International Department of the Central Committee
Sharof Rashidov	Шараф Рашидов	Candidate	Candidate	1917	1983	1939	Uzbek	One: Party office; First Secretary, Central Committee of the Communist Party of Uzbekistan
Eduard Shevardnadze	Эдуард Шеварднадзе	By-election	Candidate	1928	2014	1936	Georgian	One: Party office; First Secretary, Central Committee of the Communist Party of Georgia
Mikhail Solomentsev	Михаи́л Соло́менцев	Candidate	Candidate	1913	2008	1940	Russian	One: State office; Chairman, Council of Ministers of the Russian SFSR
Nikolai Tikhonov	Николай Тихонов	By-election	Promoted	1905	1997	1940	Russian	One: State offices; First Deputy Chairman, Council of Ministers of the USSR
