= Secretariat of the 23rd Congress of the Communist Party of the Soviet Union =

The 23rd Secretariat of the Communist Party of the Soviet Union was elected by the 23rd Central Committee in the aftermath of the 23rd Congress.

== List of members ==
Rank	Name (birth–death)	Took office	Left office	Duration	Note
1	Leonid Brezhnev (1906–1982)	8 April 1966	9 April 1971	5 years, 2 days	Elected General Secretary at the 1st Plenary Session.
7	Yuri Andropov (1914–1984)	8 April 1966	21 June 1967	1 year, 75 days	Resigned from his seat at the 5th Plenary Session.
5	Pyotr Demichev (1918–2000)	8 April 1966	9 April 1971	5 years, 2 days	—
9	Ivan Kapitonov (1915–2002)	8 April 1966	9 April 1971	5 years, 2 days	—
10	Konstantin Katushev (1927–2010)	10 April 1968	9 April 1971	2 years, 364 days	Elected at the 7th Plenary Session.
4	Andrei Kirilenko (1906–1990)	8 April 1966	9 April 1971	5 years, 2 days	—
11	Fyodor Kulakov (1918–1978)	8 April 1966	9 April 1971	5 years, 2 days	—
8	Boris Ponomarev (1905–1995)	8 April 1966	9 April 1971	5 years, 2 days	—
12	Aleksandr Rudakov (1910–1966)	8 April 1966	10 June 1966	63 days	Died after a prolonged battle with illness.
3	Alexander Shelepin (1918–1994)	13 December 1966	26 September 1967	287 days	Elected at the 4th Plenary Session. Relieved of his duties at the 6th Plenary Session.
13	Mikhail Solomentsev (1913–2008)	13 December 1966	9 April 1971	4 years, 117 days	Elected at the 4th Plenary Session.
2	Mikhail Suslov (1902–1982)	8 April 1966	9 April 1971	5 years, 2 days	—
6	Dmitriy Ustinov (1908–1984)	8 April 1966	9 April 1971	5 years, 2 days	—
