= Andrei Kirilenko (politician) =

Soviet politician (1906–1990)

- Андрей Кириленко

Senior Secretary of Cadres of the Communist Party of the Soviet Union
- In office 8 April 1966 – 5 March 1976
- Leader: Leonid Brezhnev
- Preceded by: Alexander Shelepin
- Succeeded by: Konstantin Chernenko

First Secretary of the Dnipropetrovsk Regional Committee
- In office June 1950 – December 1955
- Preceded by: Leonid Brezhnev
- Succeeded by: Volodymyr Shcherbytsky

Personal details
- Born: 8 September 1906 Alexeyevka, Voronezh Governorate, Russian Empire
- Died: 12 May 1990 (aged 83) Moscow, Russian SFSR, Soviet Union
- Party: Communist Party of the Soviet Union (1930–1990)
- Profession: Design and aircraft engineer, electrician, civil servant
- Central institution membership: 1966–1982: Member of the 23rd, 24th, 25th & 26th Secretariat; 1962–1982: Member of the 22nd, 23rd, 24th, 25th & 26th Politburo; 1957–1961: Candidate member of the 19th Politburo; Other political offices held: 1947–1950: First Secretary of the Mykolaiv Regional Committee; 1955–1962: First Secretary of the Sverdlovsk Regional Committee

Andrei Pavlovich Kirilenko (Ukrainian: Андрій Павлович Кириленко, romanized: Andriy Pavlovych Kyrylenko; Russian: Андрей Павлович Кириленко, IPA: [ɐnˈdrʲej ˈpavləvʲɪtɕ kʲɪrʲɪˈlʲɛnkə]; 8 September [O.S. 26 August] 1906 – 12 May 1990) was a Soviet politician, and a member of the Secretariat of the Communist Party of the Soviet Union. He was one of the most loyal politicians to Leonid Brezhnev.

His role in the CPSU was to ensure Brezhnev's power base and, if possible, to strengthen Brezhnev's position within the party. In order to accomplish this task, he emerged as one of the leading figures in the Secretariat under Brezhnev's rule.

== Early life and career ==
Andrei Kirilenko was born on 8 September 1906 in the village of Alexeyevka, Belgorod Oblast, in the Russian Empire, to a working-class family. As a young boy, he worked as an electrician and a locksmith. In 1920, Kirilenko graduated from one of the local schools; five years later, he graduated from the Alekseevskii vocational technical school. In the mid-to-late 1920s, Kirilenko started working for a mining enterprise located in the Voronezh Oblast. He became an active member of Komsomol in 1929 and, two years later, became a member of the All-Union Communist Party. In 1936, he graduated from the Rybinsk Aviation Technology Institute. He started working as a design engineer for the aircraft factory, Zaporizhia Engine Plant. In 1938, Kirilenko became an active participant in party politics and was eventually selected to the position of Second Secretary of the Voroshilov District Party Committee in Zaporozhye Oblast. The following year, he was voted in as First Secretary. Later that year he was appointed to Second Secretary of the Zaporizhzhya Regional Party Committee of the Ukrainian Soviet Socialist Republic. In this role, Kirilenko made significant contributions to the development of metallurgical and electrical engineering, but also other sorts of industry.

During the Great Patriotic War, Kirilenko was directly involved with evacuating industry to safe zones. From 1941 to 1943, he was a member of the Military Soviet of the 18th Army of the Southern Front. He contributed by improving discipline among soldiers as well as improving the materiel support for the troops. In 1943, Kirilenko was relocated to Moscow, and during his stay there the production of advanced aircraft increased rapidly. By the end of the war, in 1944, Kirilenko was made First Secretary of the Zaporizhzhya Regional Party. He succeeded Leonid Brezhnev, future Soviet leader, as First Secretary of the Dnepropetrovsk Regional Party Committee. From 1955 to 1962, he was First Secretary of the Sverdlovsk Regional Party Committee; he was appointed by Nikita Khrushchev himself to take charge of economic planning and personnel selection in urban areas of the Russian Soviet Federative Socialist Republic (RSFSR). Kirilenko was later promoted to Khrushchev's vice-chairman of the Bureau of the Central Committee. Brezhnev benefited from Kirilenko's position, Brezhnev used him to win over supporters of his conspiracy against Khrushchev.

== Brezhnev era ==
=== Rise to prominence ===
Immediately after Khrushchev's ouster, a "collective leadership" had been formed with Brezhnev as First Secretary, Alexei Kosygin as head of government and Anastas Mikoyan (replaced in 1965 by Nikolai Podgorny) as head of state. Central Committee Secretaries Mikhail Suslov and Kirilenko were also a part of the collective leadership, with Kirilenko ranked fifth behind Brezhnev, Podgorny, Kosygin, and Suslov. In 1962, Kirilenko became a voting member of the Political Bureau (Politburo). In 1966, the Bureau of the Central Committee of the RSFSR was abolished, and Kirilenko became Brezhnev's chief lieutenant. Vadim Medvedev, a Soviet official, said Kirilenko's chief concern was maintaining and strengthening Brezhnev's position within the Party. Men who were loyal to Brezhnev were also loyal to Kirilenko.

Konstantin Chernenko, another old Brezhnev protégé, became a "counterweight" to Kirilenko's power within the Central Committee (CC). Before Chernenko's rise in the Soviet hierarchy, Kirilenko provided detailed supervision of new party personnel and the economy. When Chernenko came on board in 1976, Kirilenko supervised the economy. In Brezhnev's last years, Kirilenko's health was beginning to decline, and his memory weakened. Despite his failing health, he was still a high-standing member, and he usually presided over the meetings of the Secretariat when Suslov was not around. While First World representatives treated Kirilenko as Second Secretary of the Communist Party because most of his duties had been associated with that office in the past, the position was actually held by Suslov. During most of his term, Kirilenko was one of four who had both a seat in the secretariat and Politburo; the three others were Brezhnev, Suslov and Fyodor Kulakov.

By 1976 Kirilenko's position within the Soviet leadership had grown to such an extent that leading officials, such as Brezhnev and Suslov, were beginning to worry about his "organisational tail" in the Russian Soviet Federative Socialist Republic (RSFSR). His supervisory responsibilities led many of his colleagues to view him as a threat to the Party Organisational Work Department of the Central Committee – the Central Committee department overseeing the civilian economy and the military–industrial complex. His position was weakened drastically by the end of the year, his weakened position did not lead to a strengthening of the Collective leadership but to the weakening of it.

=== Later career and resignation ===
As with Kosygin, Kirilenko's leading position in the Soviet leadership was in "limbo" due to his support for economic reform to countenance the country's stagnating economy. Kirilenko grew increasingly estranged with Brezhnev in 1977, some believe that it was due to the growing economic hardship that faced the Soviet Union. It is said that the two argued over resource allocation and on how to modernise the ailing economy. However, the most common explanation is that Kirilenko grew estranged due to his weakened position within the Collective leadership.

Kirilenko led the Soviet delegation to the December 1977 MPLA Party Congress. At this congress, MPLA officially subscribed to the doctrine of Marxist-Leninism. This congress was important to the Soviet Union, and Kirilenko compared Angola's development with that of Vietnam. Kirilenko, along with Premier Kosygin, had been one of the most vocal opponents to a Soviet intervention in Afghanistan. He blamed the Afghan Party leadership for the rebellion against them, claiming that the Soviets "gave them everything." He also disliked it when the Afghan leadership tried to justify their murderous actions on the grounds that Vladimir Lenin also did it.

Kirilenko was seen as a possible candidate for the post of First Deputy Chairman of the Presidium of the Supreme Soviet in 1977, however, First World observers tended to overrate the significance of the office, and because of it, their observation was completely off the mark. Vasily Kuznetsov, first deputy minister of foreign affairs, was chosen to the office of First Deputy Chairman instead. During Brezhnev's later rule, KGB chairman Yuri Andropov gradually took over the functions and, eventually, Kirilenko's position within the Soviet leadership. In 1979, Kirilenko lost his unofficial office as supervisor of the defence industry over to Pavel Finogenov, a protégé of Dmitriy Ustinov. Kirilenko was seen as a key candidate by the West to replace Brezhnev as Soviet leader in 1982. After Brezhnev's death, Kirilenko was removed from the ruling Politburo by the new General Secretary Andropov. With his deteriorating health, having a disease known as arteriosclerosis, Kirilenko was disabled from ensuing active politics or protecting himself from Andropov's attacks. After Brezhnev's death and funeral, Kirilenko's mental condition deteriorated to where he could not remember the names of several leading Politburo members. He was unable to write properly during his later life; when asked by Andropov to write a letter of resignation in 1982, he was unable to do so. The decision to remove Kirilenko was taken before Andropov rose to power, so in the event Brezhnev had died later, Kirilenko would still have been forced to resign. The reason for the decision was that Kirilenko's son had tried to defect to the United Kingdom.

== Later life, death, and recognition ==
When compared to other Soviet politicians who shared the same fate, Kirilenko's downfall was, in the words of historian R. Judson Mitchell, a "relatively easy" fall from power. At Brezhnev's lying-in-state and subsequent funeral, he was allowed to stand besides Brezhnev's family even though he was not a member of the Soviet leadership at the time. Kirilenko made his last public appearance in 1983, and was given an honorary retirement the same year. Mitchell believes that Andropov gave Kirilenko the honorary retirement so that he could win over Kirilenko's "organisational tail", literally Kirilenko's appointees to top-ranking offices during his years in service. He lived the rest of his life in Moscow and died on 12 May 1990 at age 83 and was buried at the Troyekurovskoye Cemetery.

== Awards and honors ==
During his lifetime, he was awarded the Hero of Socialist Labour twice, and he received seven Orders of Lenin and one Order of the October Revolution.

USSR

Hero of Socialist Labor, twice (1966, 1976)
Seven Orders of Lenin (1948, 1953, 1956, 1958, 1966, 1971, 1976)
Order of the October Revolution (1981)
Order of the Patriotic War, 2nd class (1985)
Medal "For the Defence of Odessa" (1942)
Medal "For the Defence of the Caucasus" (1944)
Medal "For the Victory over Germany in the Great Patriotic War 1941–1945" (1945)
Medal "For Valiant Labour in the Great Patriotic War 1941–1945" (1945)
Medal "For Labour Valour"
Medal "For Distinction in Guarding the State Border of the USSR"
Jubilee Medal "In Commemoration of the 100th Anniversary of the Birth of Vladimir Ilyich Lenin" (1969)
Medal "Veteran of Labour" (1974)
Medal "For the Restoration of the Donbas Coal Mines" (1947)
Medal "For the Restoration of the Black Metallurgy Enterprises of the South" (1948)

Foreign

Order of Georgi Dimitrov (Bulgaria)
Order of Klement Gottwald (Czechoslovakia)
