= Mykolaiv Regional Committee of the Communist Party of Ukraine =

The Mykolaiv Regional Committee of the Communist Party of Ukraine, commonly referred to as the Mykolaiv CPU obkom, was the position of highest authority in the Mykolaiv Oblast, in the Ukrainian SSR of the Soviet Union. The position was created on September 22, 1937, and abolished in August 1991. The First Secretary was a de facto appointed position usually by the Central Committee of the Communist Party of Ukraine or the First Secretary of the Communist Party of Ukraine.

== List of First Secretaries of the Communist Party of Mykolaiv ==
Name	Term of Office		Life years
Name	Start	End	Life years
First Secretaries of the Oblast Committee of the Communist Party
Mykola Volkov	September 1937	April 27, 1938	1898–1938
Pavlo Staryhin	April 1938	1938	1897–19..
Serhiy Butyrin	1938	1941	1900–1942
Nazi German occupation (1941–1943)
Ivan Filippov	1943	1947	1905–1960
Andrei Kirilenko	1947	1950	1906–1990
Andriy Malenkin	April 1950	1961	1906–1990
Oleksandr Ivashchenko (Note: For Industry from January 1963)	1961	December 1964	1916–19..
Tymofiy Barylnyk (Note: For Agriculture)	January 1963	December 1964	1909–1987
Trokhym Poplyovkin	December 1964	March 1969	1915–1977
Yakiv Pohrebnyak	March 1969	March 1971	1928–
Volodymyr Vaslyayev	March 1971	October 4, 1980	1924–1980
Leonid Sharayev	October 16, 1980	May 25, 1990	1935–
Ivan Hrytsai	May 25, 1990	January 10, 1991	1938–
Volodymyr Matveyev	January 10, 1991	August 1991	1943–

== See also ==
- Mykolaiv Oblast

== Sources ==
- World Statesmen.org
