= Sayyora Rashidova =

Uzbek chemist scientist

- Born: Sayyora Sharofovna Rashidova; August 2, 1943; Jizzakh, Samarkand region, Uzbek SSR, USSR
- Occupation: chemist scientist
- Awards: "Meritorious Scientist of the Republic of Uzbekistan; Order of "Dustlik"; Order of "El-yurt khurmati"; "Order of Outstanding Merit"

Sayyora Rashidova (was born on August 2, 1943) was the Commissioner for Human Rights of the Republic of Uzbekistan (Ombudsman) from 1995 to 2016.

== Biography ==
Sayora Sharafovna Rashidova was born on August 2, 1943, in Jizzakh, Republic of Uzbekistan, into the family of the prominent statesman and writer Sharof Rashidov. After completing high school No. 43 in Tashkent in 1960, she entered the Chemistry Faculty of Moscow State University. After graduating from the university, she worked as a research intern at the A.V. Topchiev Institute of Petrochemical Synthesis of the USSR Academy of Sciences. She also attended full-time graduate studies at the Institute of Chemistry of the Academy of Sciences of the Uzbek SSR. After defending her candidate's dissertation in 1971, she began working at the Institute of Chemistry as a junior research associate. In 1979, she became the head of the polymer chemistry department, and in 1981, she became the director of the Institute of Chemistry and Physics of Polymers of the Academy of Sciences of the Uzbek SSR.

She actively participates in the public life of the Republic as the president of the Association of Women Scientists "Olima". She was elected as a deputy of the Oliy Majlis of the Republic of Uzbekistan in the first (1995-1999) and second (2000-2004) convocations. At the session of the Oliy Majlis of the Republic of Uzbekistan of the first convocation in December 1995, Rashidova was elected as the Commissioner for Human Rights (Ombudsman). She served in this position for four five-year terms.

Rashidova actively participates in numerous international forums on human rights. She has more than 100 publications in the field of human rights and is the author and chief editor of a series of collections, including "Ombudsmen of the World," "Ombudsman in Uzbekistan," "Human Rights Monitoring," and "Human Rights Protection in Uzbekistan". She is a member of the editorial boards of several journals, including "Democratization and Human Rights," "Public Opinion", "Human Rights," and others.

== Awards ==
- Honored Scientist of the Republic of Uzbekistan (1993)
- Order of Friendship (1999)
- Order of Respect of the Country (2003)
- Order of Outstanding Merit (2019)
