= Politburo of the 26th Congress of the Communist Party of the Soviet Union =

Politburo

26th Politburo
- 25th Politburo ← → 27th Politburo
- Duration: 3 March 1981 – 6 March 1986

The Politburo of the 26th Congress of the Communist Party of the Soviet Union was in session from 1981 to 1986.

== Composition ==
=== Members ===
Members of the Political Bureau of the 26th Congress of the Communist Party of the Soviet Union
| Name | Cyrillic | 25th POL | 27th POL | Birth | Death | PM | Ethnicity |
|---|---|---|---|---|---|---|---|
| Heydar Aliyev | Гейда́р Али́ев | Promoted | Reelected | 1923 | 2003 | 1945 | Azerbaijani |
| Yuri Andropov | Юрий Андропов | Old | Died | 1914 | 1984 | 1939 | Russian |
| Leonid Brezhnev | Леонид Брежнев | Old | Died | 1906 | 1982 | 1931 | Russian |
| Viktor Chebrikov | Виктор Че́бриков | Promoted | Reelected | 1923 | 1999 | 1950 | Ukrainian |
| Konstantin Chernenko | Константин Черненко | Old | Died | 1911 | 1985 | 1931 | Ukrainian |
| Mikhail Gorbachev | Михаил Горбачёв | Old | Reelected | 1931 | 2022 | 1952 | Russian |
| Viktor Grishin | Ви́ктор Гри́шин | Old | Relieved | 1914 | 1992 | 1939 | Russian |
| Andrei Gromyko | Андрей Громыко | Old | Reelected | 1909 | 1989 | 1931 | Belarusian |
| Andrei Kirilenko | Андре́й Кириле́нко | Old | Relieved | 1906 | 1990 | 1930 | Ukrainian |
| Dinmukhamed Kunaev | Дінмұхаммед Қонаев | Old | Reelected | 1912 | 1993 | 1939 | Kazakh |
| Yegor Ligachev | Егор Лигачёв | By-election | Reelected | 1920 | 2021 | 1944 | Russian |
| Arvīds Pelše | А́рвид Пе́льше | Old | Died | 1899 | 1983 | 1915 | Latvian |
| Grigory Romanov | Григорий Романов | Old | Relieved | 1923 | 2008 | 1944 | Russian |
| Nikolai Ryzhkov | Николай Рыжков | By-election | Reelected | 1929 | 2024 | 1956 | Russian |
| Volodymyr Shcherbytsky | Влади́мир Щерби́цкий | Old | Reelected | 1918 | 1990 | 1948 | Ukrainian |
| Eduard Shevardnadze | Эдуард Шеварднадзе | Promoted | Reelected | 1928 | 2014 | 1936 | Georgian |
| Mikhail Solomentsev | Михаи́л Соло́менцев | Promoted | Reelected | 1913 | 2008 | 1940 | Russian |
| Mikhail Suslov | Михаил Суслов | Old | Died | 1902 | 1982 | 1921 | Russian |
| Nikolai Tikhonov | Николай Тихонов | Old | Relieved | 1905 | 1997 | 1940 | Russian |
| Dmitriy Ustinov | Дми́трий Усти́нов | Old | Died | 1908 | 1984 | 1927 | Russian |
| Vitaly Vorotnikov | Вита́лий Воротнико́в | Promoted | Reelected | 1926 | 2012 | 1950 | Russian |

=== Candidates ===
Members of the Political Bureau of the 26th Congress of the Communist Party of the Soviet Union
| Name | Cyrillic | 25th POL | 27th POL | Birth | Death | PM | Ethnicity |
|---|---|---|---|---|---|---|---|
| Heydar Aliyev | Гейда́р Али́ев | Candidate | Promoted | 1923 | 2003 | 1945 | Azerbaijani |
| Viktor Chebrikov | Виктор Че́бриков | By-election | Promoted | 1923 | 1999 | 1950 | Ukrainian |
| Pyotr Demichev | Пётр Де́мичев | Candidate | Candidate | 1917 | 2010 | 1939 | Russian |
| Vladimir Dolgikh | Владимир Долгих | By-election | Candidate | 1924 | 2020 | 1942 | Russian |
| Tikhon Kiselyov | Ти́хон Киселёв | Candidate | Died | 1917 | 1983 | 1940 | Belarusian |
| Vasily Kuznetsov | Василий Кузнецов | Candidate | Not | 1901 | 1990 | 1927 | Russian |
| Boris Ponomarev | Борис Пономарёв | Candidate | Not | 1905 | 1995 | 1919 | Russian |
| Sharof Rashidov | Шараф Рашидов | Candidate | Died | 1917 | 1983 | 1939 | Uzbek |
| Eduard Shevardnadze | Эдуард Шеварднадзе | Candidate | Promoted | 1928 | 2014 | 1936 | Georgian |
| Sergey Sokolov | Серге́й Соколо́в | By-election | Candidate | 1911 | 2012 | 1937 | Russian |
| Mikhail Solomentsev | Михаи́л Соло́менцев | Candidate | Promoted | 1913 | 2008 | 1940 | Russian |
| Nikolai Talyzin | Никола́й Талы́зин | By-election | Candidate | 1929 | 1991 | 1960 | Russian |
| Vitaly Vorotnikov | Вита́лий Воротнико́в | By-election | Promoted | 1926 | 2012 | 1950 | Russian |
| Boris Yeltsin | Борис Ельцин | By-election | Candidate | 1931 | 2007 | 1961 | Russian |
