= Arvīds Pelše =

Soviet Latvian politician (1899–1983)

- Арвид Пельше
- Pelše in 1969

Chairman of the Party Control Committee of the Central Committee
- In office 8 April 1966 – 29 May 1983
- Preceded by: Nikolay Shvernik
- Succeeded by: Mikhail Solomentsev

First Secretary of the Communist Party of Latvia
- In office 25 November 1959 – 15 April 1966
- Preceded by: Jānis Kalnbērziņš
- Succeeded by: Augusts Voss

Full member of the 23rd, 24th, 25th, 26th Politburo
- In office 8 April 1966 – 29 May 1983

Personal details
- Born: 7 February 1899 Iecava Parish, Bauska county, Courland Governorate, Russian Empire
- Died: 29 May 1983 (aged 84) Moscow, Russian SFSR, Soviet Union
- Resting place: Kremlin Wall Necropolis, Moscow
- Party: RSDLP (Bolsheviks) (1915–1918); CPSU (1918–1983)
- Other political affiliations: Communist Party of Latvia (1915-1983)
- Profession: Politician, historian

Arvīds Pelše (Russian: А́рвид Я́нович Пе́льше, Arvid Yanovich Pelshe; 7 February [O.S. 26 January] 1899 – 29 May 1983) was a Latvian Soviet politician, functionary, and historian.

== Career ==
Pelše was born into a peasant family, in Mazie farm near Zālīte, Iecava in Bauska county, in the Courland Governorate of the Russian Empire (now Latvia) to Johan Pelše and his wife Lisa. He was baptized in the village church on 14 March of the same year. As a worker in Riga, Pelše joined the Social-Democratic Party (Bolsheviks) of the Latvian Region in 1915. In 1916, he met Lenin in Switzerland. Between 1914 and 1918, Pelše worked in the workshops of Riga and Vitebsk, as a milling machine operator at the steam-engine making plant in Kharkov, as a punching worker in Petrograd and a loader in the port of Arkhangelsk. On behalf of the local committees he had joined the revolutionary propaganda. He was a delegate of the sixth congress of the Russian Social Democratic Labour Party of the Arkhangelsk party organization. He participated in the February Revolution in 1917 and was a member of the famous Petrograd Soviet. He was actively involved in the preparation and conducting of the October Revolution in 1917. In 1918, he joined the Cheka. In 1918, he was sent by Lenin to Latvia to prosecute the revolution there. In 1919, he was attached to the Red Army and later became a manager in the Construction Ministry of the Latvian Socialist Soviet Republic. After the defeat of the Soviet Latvian government, he returned to Russia in 1919.

He was a lecturer and political commissar in the Red Army from 1919 to 1929. In 1931, he graduated from the history department of the Moscow Institute of the Red Professoriat, and between 1931 and 1933, he was a graduate student in the institute. At the same time, he was an instructor at the Institute of Party History at the Central School of NKVD between 1929 and 1932. Between 1933 and 1937, he was first deputy of the Commissariat of State Farms (Sovkhozes). Between 1937 and 1940, he taught history in the Moscow Higher Educational Institute. In June 1940, he played a leading role in the process of admitting of Latvia into the USSR. From March 1941 to 1959, he served as Secretary of the Central Committee of the Communist Party of Latvia for propaganda and agitation. During the Great Patriotic War in 1941-1945, he worked to prepare the party and the Soviet cadres to transform Latvia into a communist state.

In 1958, he traveled to Denmark to attend the 20th Congress of the Communist Party of Denmark. July 1959 to November 1959 marked the purge of all nascent nationalism from the Communist Party of Latvia—about 2,000 of the party leadership and activists were stripped of their posts and privileges.

The Soviets elevated Pelše to First Secretary, replacing the purged Kalnbērziņš on 25 November 1959. In January 1960, Pelše promptly denounced his former (purged) associates for deviating from "the right path in carrying out Leninist nationality policy". From that point forward, the First Secretaries of the Latvian SSR were servile party functionaries, as first embodied by Pelše, whom Latvians regarded as symbols of submissiveness to the Soviets.

Pelše was appointed as member of the Central Committee in 1961. That same year, after Yuri Gagarin returned from his space mission, Pelše proposed changing the name of the Latvian capital Rīga but the Soviet central authorities saw this as extreme.

In 1963, Pelše headed a commission nicknamed the "Pelše Commission", which investigated the assassination of Sergei Kirov. The commission finished its work in 1967.

Pelše served as First Secretary of the Latvian SSR until 15 April 1966. At the 23rd Party Congress in 1966, Pelše addressed his colleagues as follows:

"We will never permit anyone to interfere in our internal affairs but will conduct a determined struggle against any imperialist interference in the affairs of other countries and peoples."

On 7 November 1975, Pelše gave a speech in the ceremony commemorating the 58th anniversary of the October Revolution. In his address, Pelše confirmed continuing Soviet support for "fighters for freedom" and "the patriots in Angola."

He was rewarded for his faithful service, being selected by the 23rd Party Congress for full membership to the Politburo of the CPSU, a position he held until his death in May 1983. Pelše was also Chairman of the Party Control Committee, which oversaw the discipline of party members, from 1966 to 1983.

== Death and legacy ==
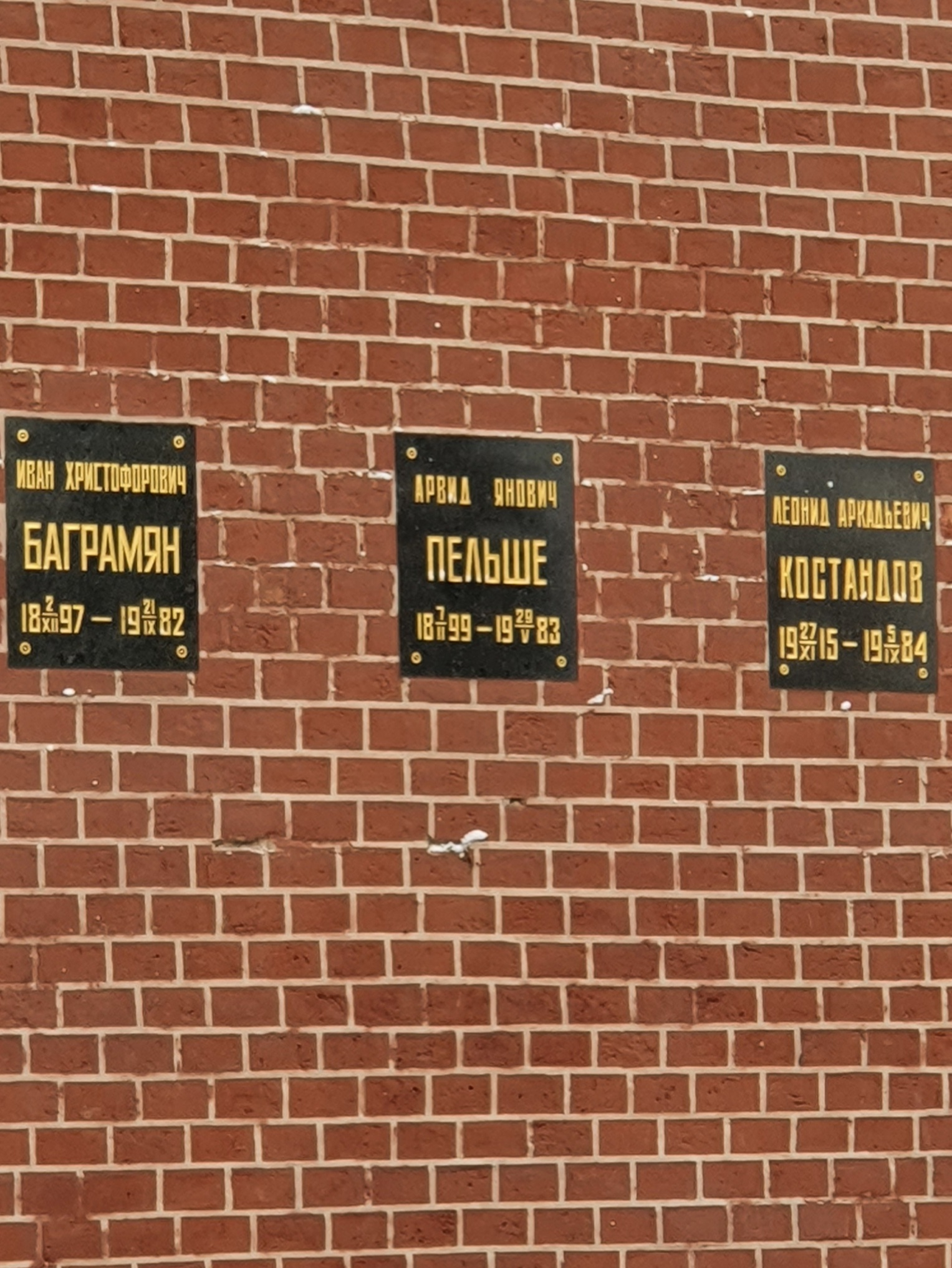
Pelše's grave at the Kremlin Wall Necropolis

Pelše's health was failing in his last years. When he did not attend the funeral of Leonid Brezhnev in November 1982, rumors spread he had died, but a few days later, on 23 November, he appeared in a session of the Supreme Soviet. Another absence which was noticed by the media was in the ceremony marking the centennial of the death of Karl Marx, on 31 March 1983, one month before he died.

He suffered from lung cancer, as well as atelectasis, which aggravated his lungs, and worsening cardiopulmonary failure. He died of cardiac arrest at 5:55 on 29 May 1983. Pelše was honoured with a state funeral; his remains lay in state at the House of Trade Unions. On 2 June, his ashes were carried by an armoured vehicle to Red Square, with all the Politburo members standing at the top of Lenin's Mausoleum. After lavish eulogies were read by Soviet leader Yuri Andropov and Politburo member Viktor Grishin, his ashes were laid to rest in the Kremlin Wall Necropolis.

Pelše wrote some works on the history of the CPSU, on the history of the revolutionary movement in Latvia, anti-capitalist nationalists, the socialist and communist construction in the country.

He was twice awarded with Hero of the Socialist Labor (1969, 1979), 6 Order of Lenin, the Order of the October Revolution and other medals. The Rīga Polytechnic Institute was named for Pelše after he died.

Pelše was married three times. He had two children from the first marriage: a daughter, Beruta (died), and son, Arvik (died during World War II). One son from the second marriage, Tai, (was born in 1930) - a pensioner, and did not support any contacts with his father after the 3rd marriage. The third wife of Pelše was Lidiya, the ex-wife of Stalin's secretary Alexander Poskrebyshev. From 1966 until his death, he lived at 15 Spiridonovka Street. A commemorative plaque was placed in the front of the building.
