= Presidium of the 22nd Congress of the Communist Party of the Soviet Union =

22nd Presidium
- 20th Presidium ← → 23rd Politburo
- Duration: 31 October 1961 – 8 April 1966

First Secretary of the Communist Party of the Soviet Union

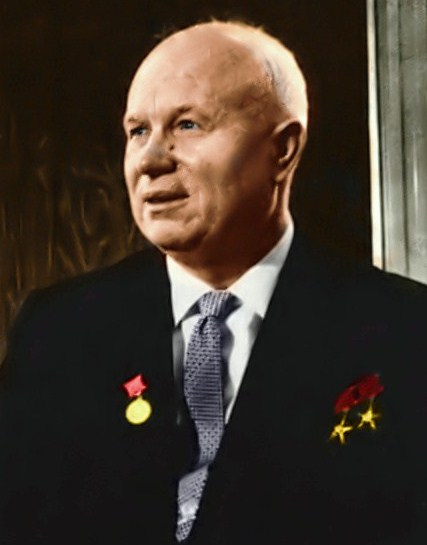
Khrushchev chaired the Presidium from 1955 to 1964.

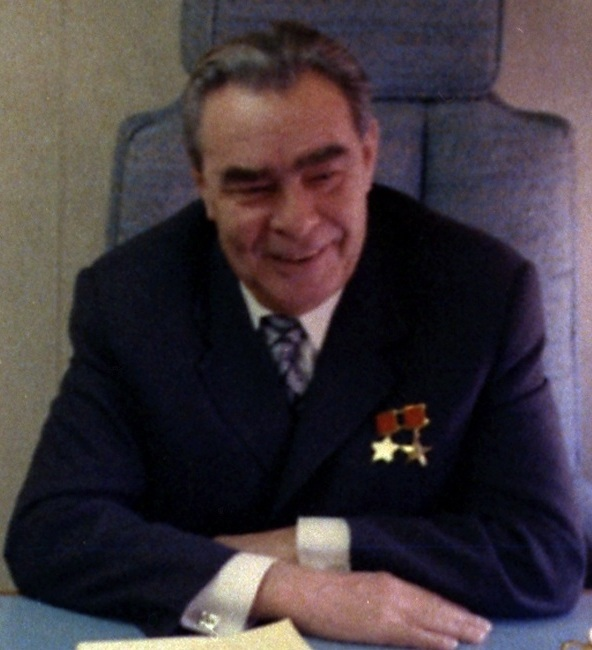
Brezhnev succeeded Khrushchev in 1964, and chaired the renamed Presidium until 1982.

The Presidium of the 22nd Congress of the Communist Party of the Soviet Union (CPSU) was in session from 1961 to 1966. CPSU First Secretary Nikita Khrushchev chaired the Presidium from 1961 to 1964; Leonid Brezhnev succeeded him that year and chaired it until 1966. In contrast to full members, candidate members of the Presidium could not vote during Presidium sessions. It was normal that a full member of the Presidium had previously served as a candidate member, but this was not always the case. During the term 23 people held seats in the Presidium: 14 full members and 9 candidate members. One candidate member was promoted to full membership in the Presidium during the term. Not a single Presidium member died during this period while retaining office.

The Central Committee of the Communist Party of the Soviet Union was, according to sovietologists Merle Fainsod and Jerry F. Hough, elected unanimously at the 22nd Party Congress (17–31 October 1961). The 22nd Central Committee in turn elected the Politburo unanimously. Brezhnev, the Chairman of the Presidium of the Supreme Soviet, was considered as an alternative to Kozlov as Second Secretary, but was instead made Third Secretary, the secretary responsible for industry. In 1963, for unknown reasons, possibly health reasons, Brezhnev took over Kozlov's duties at the Secretariat, and became the de facto Second Secretary. When a Western journalist asked Khrushchev in 1963 who would succeed him, Khrushchev responded bluntly "Brezhnev". After a prolonged power struggle, Khrushchev was ousted from power, and a collective leadership comprising Brezhnev, Kosygin, Podgorny, Mikhail Suslov and Andrei Kirilenko was formed.

In the months following Khrushchev's ousting, three members were elected to the Presidium: Alexander Shelepin, the Chairman of the State Control Commission; Petro Shelest, the First Secretary of the Communist Party of Ukraine; and Kirill Mazurov, a First Deputy Chairman of the Council of Ministers. While Brezhnev may have been General Secretary, he did not have a majority in the Presidium; when Kosygin and Podgorny agreed on policy, which was not often the case, Brezhnev found himself in the minority. Brezhnev could only count on three to four votes in the Presidium: Suslov, who often switched sides, Kirilenko, Pelše and Dmitry Polyansky. Brezhnev and Kosygin often disagreed on policy; Brezhnev was a conservative while Kosygin was a modest reformer. Kosygin, who had begun his premiership as Brezhnev's equal, lost much power and influence within the Presidium when he introduced the 1965–1971 Soviet economic reform.

== Composition ==
=== Members ===
Members of the Presidium of the 22nd Congress of the Communist Party of the Soviet Union
Name	Cyrillic	20th PRE	23rd POL	Birth	Death	PM	Ethnicity
Leonid Brezhnev	Леонид Брежнев	Old	Reelected	1906	1982	1931	Russian
Nikita Khrushchev	Никита Хрущёв	Old	Relieved	1894	1971	1918	Russian
Andrei Kirilenko	Андре́й Кириле́нко	By-election	Reelected	1906	1990	1930	Ukrainian
Alexei Kosygin	Алексей Косыгин	Old	Reelected	1904	1980	1927	Russian
Frol Kozlov	Фрол Козлов	Old	Relieved	1908	1965	1926	Russian
Otto Kuusinen	Отто Куусинен	Old	Died	1881	1964	1918	Finn
Kirill Mazurov	Кири́лл Ма́зуров	Promoted	Reelected	1914	1989	1940	Belarusian
Anastas Mikoyan	Анастас Микоян	Old	Not	1895	1978	1915	Armenian
Nikolai Podgorny	Никола́й Подго́рный	Old	Reelected	1903	1983	1930	Ukrainian
Dmitry Polyansky	Дми́трий Поля́нский	Old	Reelected	1917	2001	1939	Ukrainian
Alexander Shelepin	Алекса́ндр Шеле́пин	By-election	Reelected	1918	1994	1940	Russian
Petro Shelest	Петро Шелест	Promoted	Reelected	1908	1996	1928	Ukrainian
Nikolai Shvernik	Никола́й Шве́рник	Old	Not	1888	1970	1905	Russian
Mikhail Suslov	Михаил Суслов	Old	Reelected	1902	1982	1921	Russian
Gennady Voronov	Геннадий Воронов	Candidate	Reelected	1910	1994	1931	Russian

=== Candidates ===
Candidate Members of the Presidium of the 22nd Congress of the Communist Party of the Soviet Union
Name	Cyrillic	20th PRE	23rd POL	Birth	Death	PM	Ethnicity
Pyotr Demichev	Пётр Де́мичев	By-election	Candidate	1917	2010	1939	Russian
Viktor Grishin	Ви́ктор Гри́шин	Candidate	Candidate	1914	1992	1939	Russian
Kirill Mazurov	Кири́лл Ма́зуров	Candidate	Promoted	1914	1989	1940	Belarusian
Vasil Mzhavanadze	Василий Мжаванадзе	Candidate	Candidate	1902	1988	1927	Georgian
Sharof Rashidov	Шараф Рашидов	New	Candidate	1917	1983	1939	Uzbek
Volodymyr Shcherbytsky	Влади́мир Щерби́цкий	New	Candidate	1918	1990	1948	Ukrainian
Petro Shelest	Петро Шелест	By-election	Promoted	1908	1996	1928	Ukrainian
Dmitriy Ustinov	Дми́трий Усти́нов	By-election	Candidate	1908	1984	1927	Russian
Leonid Yefremov	Леонид Ефремов	By-election	Not	1912	2007	1941	Russian
