= Dmitry Polyansky =

Soviet bureaucrat

- Дмитрий Полянский
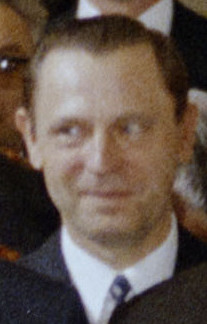
- Polyansky in 1972

First Deputy Chairman of the Council of Ministers of the Soviet Union
- In office 2 October 1965 – 2 February 1973
- Premier: Alexei Kosygin
- Preceded by: Kirill Mazurov
- Succeeded by: Nikolai Tikhonov

Chairman of the Council of Ministers of the Russian SFSR
- In office 31 March 1958 – 23 November 1962
- President: Mikhail Tarasov; Nikolai Ignatov; Nikolai Organov
- Preceded by: Frol Kozlov
- Succeeded by: Gennady Voronov

Full Member of the 20th, 22nd, 23rd, 24th Politburo
- In office 4 May 1960 – 5 March 1976

Candidate Member of the 20th Presidium
- In office 18 June 1958 – 4 May 1960

Personal details
- Born: Dmitry Stepanovich Polyansky; 25 October 1917 Slovianoserbsk, Russian Empire
- Died: 8 October 2001 (aged 83) Moscow, Russia
- Party: Communist Party of the Soviet Union

Dmitry Stepanovich Polyansky (Russian: Дми́трий Степа́нович Поля́нский; 7 November [O.S. 25 October] 1917 – 8 October 2001) was a Soviet bureaucrat who was First Deputy Chairman of the Council of Ministers of the Soviet Union from 1965 to 1973. From 1960 to 1976 he was a full member of the Presidium / Politburo of the Central Committee of the CPSU.

From 1945 Polyansky is in the apparatus of the Central Committee (CC) of the All-Union Communist Party (Bolsheviks). 2-nd Secretary of the Crimean Regional Party Committee (1949–52). Chairman of the executive committee of the Crimean Regional Council of Workers' Deputies (1952–54). 1-st Secretary of the Crimean Regional Committee of the CPSU / the Communist Party of Ukraine (1954–55). As a leader of Crimean Oblast Polyansky took part in its transferring from the Russian SFSR to the Ukrainian SSR. 1-st Secretary of the Chkalovsky / Orenburg Regional Committee of the CPSU (1955–57), assisted in the development of virgin and fallow lands in the region. Member of the CC of the CPSU (1956–91). 1-st Secretary of the Krasnodar Regional Committee of the CPSU (1957–58). Polyansky actively supported N. S. Khrushchev during the attempt to remove him from the post of First Secretary of the CPSU CC, undertaken by the "Anti-Party Group" of members of the Presidium of the CPSU CC, and sharply criticized its participants – Joseph Stalin's companions V. M. Molotov, G. M. Malenkov, L. M. Kaganovich at the emergency Plenum of the CPSU CC (1957). Chairman of the CM of the RSFSR (1958–62). Member of the Presidium (Politburo) of the CPSU CC (1960–76; candidate in 1958–60). In the early 1960s Polyansky expressed doubts regarding some of Khrushchev's decisions (mass corn plantings, division of the regional CPSU committees into industrial and agricultural, etc.). Deputy Chairman of the Council of Ministers (CM) of the USSR (1962–65). At the plenum of the CPSU CC (1964) Polyansky read a report denouncing Khrushchev's mistakes and supported the decision on his resignation and the nomination of L. I. Brezhnev to the post of First Secretary of the CPSU CC. First Deputy Chairman of the USSR CM (1965–73). In the early 1970s, Polyansky's relations with Brezhnev became strained. He was transferred to the post of Minister of Agriculture of the USSR (1973–76). Ambassador Extraordinary and Plenipotentiary of the USSR to Japan (1976–82), to Norway (1982–87). Polyansky contributed to a significant increase (10-fold) in trade turnover between the USSR and Japan.

As one of the CPSU leader Polyansky was also involved in the Ryazan miracle (1960), the Novocherkassk massacre (1962), the Warsaw Pact invasion of Czechoslovakia (1968) and the harassment of Aleksandr Solzhenitsyn (1974).

Polyansky was awarded four Orders of Lenin.
