= Petro Shelest =

Soviet Ukrainian politician (1908–1996)

- Петро Шелест; Пётр Шелест
- Shelest, c. 1960s-1970s

First Secretary of the Communist Party of Ukraine
- In office 23 June 1963 – 19 May 1972
- Preceded by: Nikolai Podgorny
- Succeeded by: Volodymyr Shcherbytsky

Deputy Premier of the Soviet Union
- In office 19 May 1972 – 7 May 1973
- Premier: Alexei Kosygin

Personal details
- Born: 14 February 1908 Andriivka, Kharkov Governorate, Russian Empire (now Ukraine)
- Died: 22 January 1996 (aged 87) Moscow Oblast, Russia
- Resting place: Baikove Cemetery, Kyiv
- Party: Communist Party of the Soviet Union (1928–1973)

Military service
- Allegiance: Soviet Union
- Branch/service: Red Army
- Years of service: 1936–1937
- Central institution membership: 1964–1973: Full member, 22nd, 23rd, and 24th Politburo of the Communist Party of the Soviet Union; 1961–1964: Candidate member, 22nd Presidium; 1961–1973: Full member, 22nd, 23rd and 24th Central Committee

Petro Yukhymovych Shelest (Note: Ukrainian: Петро Юхимович Шелест Russian: Пётр Ефи́мович Ше́лест, romanized: Pyotr Yefimovich Shelest) (14 February [O.S. 1 February] 1908 – 22 January 1996) was a Ukrainian Soviet politician who served as First Secretary of the Ukrainian Communist Party from 1963 until his removal in 1972. Ideologically a social moderate and a national communist, he oversaw a widespread liberalisation of Ukrainian society as part of the Khrushchev Thaw and Sixtier movement that led to increased visibility of the Ukrainian language and culture in public life. In 1972, Shelest was removed by Leonid Brezhnev and replaced with Volodymyr Shcherbytsky, who undid much of Shelest's reforms and oversaw intensive Russification of Ukrainian society.

== Early life ==
=== Childhood ===
Petro Shelest was born to a Ukrainian peasant family in the village of Andriivka, Zmiiv povit, Kharkiv Governorate on 14 (O.S. 1) February 1908. He was the seventh child in the family, with both of his parents having children from their previous marriages. Shelest's father, Yukhym Dmytrovych, who was over 60 years old at the time of his birth, had served in the Russian Imperial Army, and received all four ranks of the Cross of St. George. At the time of the Russian Revolution of 1905, the elder Shelest worked at a sugar refinery, where a workers' strike took place, but his past army career could have helped him to evade persecution by authorities. Being a well-educated man, Yukhym taught his children to read at the age of three to four years.

In 1914, Petro enrolled into a zemstvo school, where he stayed for 3 years until the February Revolution. In order to support the large family, his father was forced to swap their house for a smaller residence. Due to famine, Petro and his mother, Maria Pavliuk, were forced to travel 30 to 40 versts in order to procure food at nearby khutirs, risking their lives during winter conditions. The boy would also freighthop to reach Yama railway station in order to supply his family with salt, which could be exchanged for bread and grain.

=== Early working career ===
In early 1919 Petro and one of his sisters travelled to Poltava region in order to work at the local state farm, one of the first in the area. There the boy worked as a pig and cow herder, drove oxen and transported water. Together with his sister, they were able to earn some money and provide livelihood for their family. However, in February 1920 Petro was once again forced to leave his house, and worked as a batrak (hired labourer) at a rich peasant's farm. Due to his protests against poor payment, the boy was whipped by his employer, and the resulting scars remained on his body for the rest of his life.

After his contract period came to the end, Petro was able to purchase himself new clothes, but refused to continue working as a hired labourer. In 1921 he started working as a mailman for the state post service. In 1922 he left his previous job and found employment as a loader, and later a repairman on the railway. Next year his brigade was transferred to Kharkiv-Osnova railway junction, where he soon fell ill with malaria due to unsanitary conditions at the site. After recuperating thanks to material help and medicine delivered by his mother, Shelest continued his work and was eventually hired by Kharkiv Locomotive Repair Factory as a locksmith and boiler operator. During that time, Shelest dreamed of becoming a professional railwayman.

=== Entry into politics ===
On the recommendation of a local school headmaster and former gymnasium director in his native village, in October 1923 Shelest entered the Komsomol, despite protests of his parents. As a result, he was forced to break the relationship with his girlfriend, who sang in a church choir. As a member of Komsomol, Shelest joined the Forces of Special Purpose. During that time, he had another romantic affair with the 16-year-old daughter of a wealthy widow, but parents opposed their marriage due to the large difference in social status between their families.

In 1928 Shelest joined the Communist Party of the Soviet Union (CPSU) and in 1935 graduated from Mariupol Metallurgical Institute. He studied engineering in Kharkiv, and held industrial jobs between 1932 and 1936. He served in the Red Army from 1936 to 1937, but transferred to working for the Communist Party in 1937, as thousands of its members were caught up in the Great Purge. Between 1943 and 1954, Shelest was a chief manager of several large factories in Leningrad and Kyiv. Between March and May 1953 Shelest served as deputy head of Kyiv City Council. From 1954 to 1963, he was respectively Second Secretary of the Kyiv city party committee, Second Secretary of the regional committee, and First Secretary of the Kyiv regional party committee.

== First Secretary of Ukraine ==
=== Internal policies ===
After Shelest was appointed First Secretary of the Communist Party of Ukraine (KPU) in 1963, he set out to run Ukraine with a degree of independence from Moscow, and to develop the republic's economy and encourage Ukrainian culture. It was during his tenure that construction began on the four nuclear plants at Chernobyl.

He antagonised the Soviet leader, Nikita Khrushchev, who publicly upbraided Shelest during a visit to Hungary over late delivery of Ukrainian equipment, then remarked: "Look how glum he is - just as if a hedgehog had been rammed down his throat." In November 1964, when Khrushchev was removed from office, Shelest was promoted to full membership of the Presidium (later renamed the Politburo).

Shelest began his rule at a time of significant cultural shifts in Ukrainian society, as it began to increasingly distance itself from Russia and assert its unique identity. Regarded within the party as a localist, Shelest was viewed by various sectors of the public as either a supporter of increased Ukrainian autonomy within the Soviet Union or a typical Soviet bureaucrat. In a statement later attributed to him by historian Roman Solanchyk, Shelest said that he was "not Lazar Kaganovich" and did not rule under Ukraine in "the times of Stalin," noting himself as an opponent of hardliners. Historian Taras Kuzio has argued that Shelest was the leader of a revived national communist sect of the Communist Party of Ukraine after the group had previously been destroyed in the Great Purge. According to Kuzio, the national communist group was later led by Leonid Kravchuk, who oversaw the transition from Soviet to independent Ukraine.

A supporter of the Sixtier cultural movement and the Khrushchev Thaw, Shelest's policies brought greater prominence to the Ukrainian language and Ukrainian culture in public life, with the party echelons actively supporting such developments. An ultimately-unrealised 1965 plan, later leaked through samizdat, called for Ukrainian to eventually replace Russian as the language of instruction in higher education. The extent to which Shelest personally was involved in supporting the Sixtiers and other nationally minded Ukrainians, many of whom later formed the core of Ukraine's Soviet dissidents, remains in dispute. Shelest's policy of greater autonomy for Ukraine was also reflected in economic spheres, as he sought to decentralise economic management to the republican level. He also argued for Ukraine to become economically sovereign from the broader Soviet Union in 1965, a move which alarmed Soviet leadership. However, he was criticised by Ukrainian intellectuals such as Viacheslav Chornovil for his role in the 1965–1966 Ukrainian purge, which led to the arrest of several Sixtiers.

The core intention of Shelest's policies was to improve the popularity of the Communist Party among Ukrainians, following the extreme unpopularity of Stalinist rule in Ukraine. Such plans had fruitful results: by 1971 KPU membership was 2.5 million, and annually increasing at double the rate of the Union average.

Geographically, Shelest was associated with the city of Kharkiv, and part of the Kharkiv Clan. This further helped to establish animosity with Leonid Brezhnev and Shelest's eventual successor Volodymyr Shcherbytsky, who were both members of the rival Dnipropetrovsk Mafia. Shelest was the last Ukrainian leader from the Kharkiv Clan, and the Dnipropetrovsk Mafia dominated Ukrainian politics until being replaced by the Donetsk Clan in the 2000s.

=== Prague Spring ===
In 1968, Shelest played a major role in deciding how the Soviet government should respond to the Prague Spring, the sudden loosening of political control in communist Czechoslovakia, which created an atmosphere that spilled over into west Ukraine. He was the only other Politburo member beside Leonid Brezhnev to take part in every meeting between Soviet and Czechoslovak communist leaders during that year.

Addressing the Central Committee of the CPSU on 17 July 1968, Shelest accused the Czechoslovak communist party leadership of persecuting communists while making no attempt to control "right-wing opportunists". He claimed:

The Czechoslovak comrades babble on about their wholehearted support for “democratic socialism.” But they disregard the fact that our country, the first country in the world in which socialism triumphed, has already been living and prospering for more than 50 years in accordance with socialist laws.

During negotiations on 30 July 1968, he berated the Czechoslovak delegation, complaining that "Your TV shows, your radio programmes, your newspapers and magazines distributed into our regions closest to your borders make our people ask questions which are full of embarrassment". Shelest went on to insult František Kriegel, a senior Czechoslovak communist and veteran of the Spanish Civil War, calling him a "Galician Jew". The Czechoslovak party leader, Alexander Dubček, walked out, and later lodged a complaint about Shelest's comment and tone.

On 3 August, Shelest secretly met the hard-line Slovak communist Vasiľ Biľak, who handed him a letter inviting the Soviet government to send in troops to move to restore the dictatorship. This was used as a pretext for the Warsaw Pact invasion on 20 August.

In 1968, Shelest was awarded the "Hero of Socialist Labor" title.

== Removal and later life ==
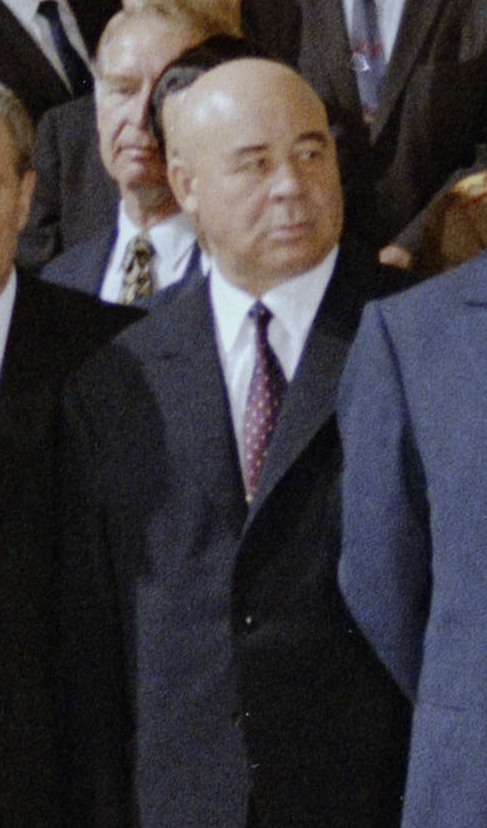
Shelest attending the signing ceremony of SALT agreement in Moscow shortly after his removal from Ukrainian leadership in 1972

By 1972, the Soviet government, under Brezhnev, had grown irritated by Shelest's continued support for Ukrainian culture. Beginning in January, Moscow launched a sweeping crackdown on Ukrainian civil society, including mass arrests. In May, Shelest was removed and replaced by Shcherbytsky as First Secretary. For the next eleven months, Shelest served as Deputy Premier in Moscow before being dismissed again and demoted to leadership of a factory outside the Soviet capital. The public cause of his removal was reported to be health problems.

Western observers originally assumed that he had been sacked because of his hard line views on foreign policy. Reputedly, he vehemently opposed the visit of U.S. President Richard Nixon, who arrived in Moscow on 22 May 1972. But in April 1973, he was publicly attacked by Shcherbytsky, while an unsigned article in the Ukrainian press denounced a book by Shelest, O Ukraine, Our Soviet Land, published in 1970, as containing 'ideological errors', 'factual errors' and 'editorial blunders' that were likely to encourage Ukrainian nationalism.

Shelest himself blamed his downfall on 'intrigues' by Shcherbytsky and Brezhnev. In his memoirs, he criticized their style of government as "autocratic" and "non-communist".

From 1973 to 1985, Shelest worked as a manager of an aircraft design bureau near Moscow. After the collapse of the Soviet Union, he was able to revisit Ukraine, after an absence of nearly 20 years. He visited Ukraine several times and delivered lectures about his tenure as leader of Ukraine. He died in Moscow in 1996.

== Family ==
Sheest's son Vitaliy was a physicist known for his promotion of Ukrainian poetic cinema. Vitaliy and his father played a decisive role in supporting the production of film The White Bird Marked with Black by Yuriy Illienko and Ivan Mykolaichuk despite pressure by Soviet authorities.

== Notes ==
Party political offices
Preceded by Nikolai Podgorny	1st Secretary of the Communist Party of Ukraine; 1963–1972	Succeeded by Volodymyr Shcherbytsky
Preceded by Hryhoriy Hryshko	1st Secretary of the Communist Party of Kyiv Oblast; 1957–1962	Succeeded by Vasyl Drozdenko
