= Nikolai Shvernik =

Soviet politician, chairman of the Presidium of the Supreme Soviet (1888–1970)

- Николай Шверник
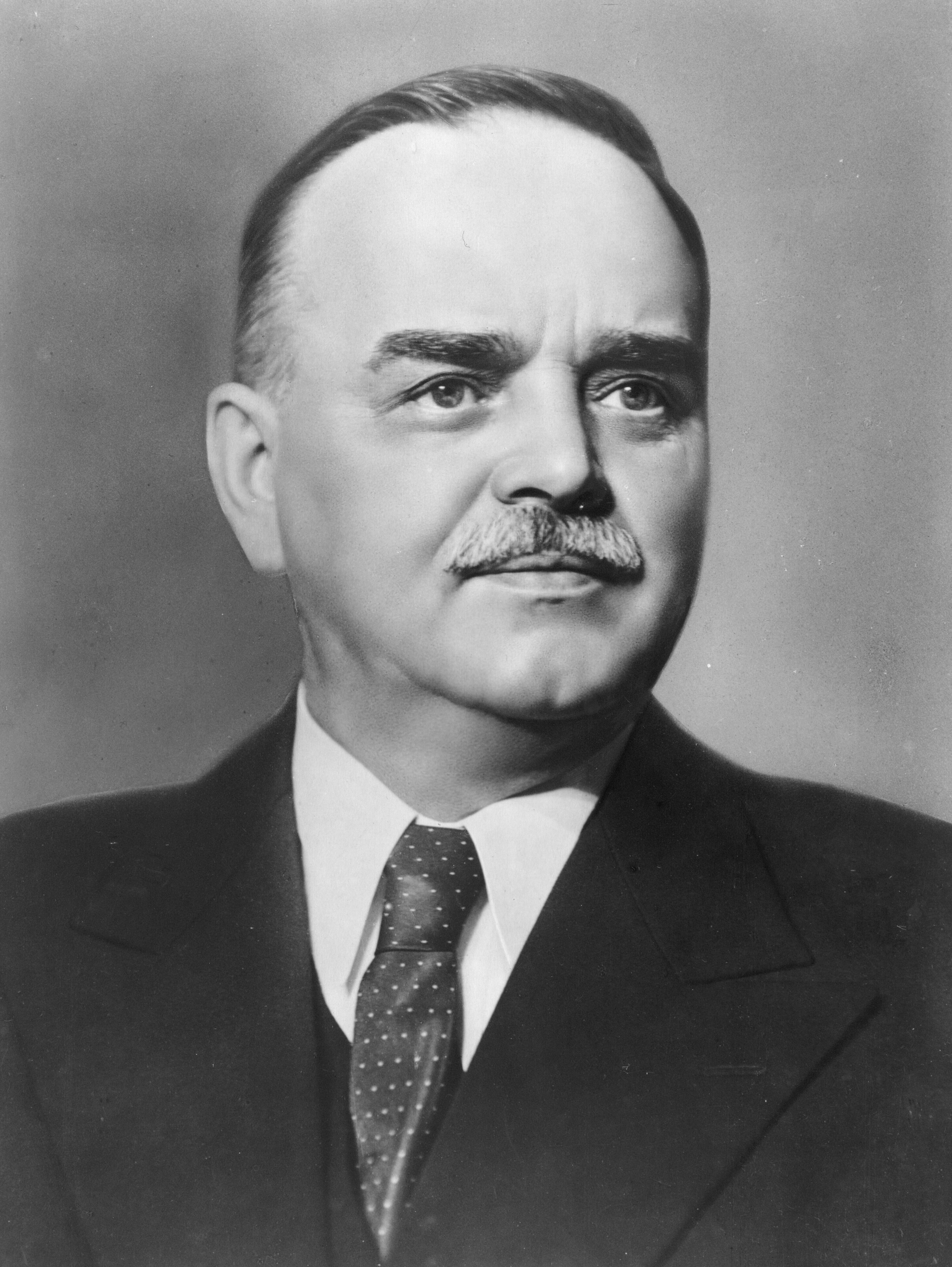
- Shvernik c. 1950

Chairman of the Presidium of the Supreme Soviet of the Soviet Union
- In office 19 March 1946 – 15 March 1953
- Premier: Joseph Stalin; Georgy Malenkov
- Preceded by: Mikhail Kalinin
- Succeeded by: Kliment Voroshilov

Deputy Chairman of the Presidium of the Supreme Soviet of the Soviet Union
- In office 4 March 1944 – 25 June 1946
- Chairman: Mikhail Kalinin
- Preceded by: Office established
- Succeeded by: Office abolished; Vasily Kuznetsov (1977)

Chairman of the Presidium of the Supreme Soviet of the Russian SFSR
- In office 4 March 1944 – 25 June 1946
- Premier: Alexei Kosygin; Mikhail Rodionov
- Preceded by: Alexei Badayev
- Succeeded by: Ivan Vlasov
Additional positions
Full member of the 20th, 22nd Presidium
In office
29 June 1957 – 8 April 1966
In office
16 October 1952 – 5 March 1953
Candidate member of the 18th, 19th Presidium
In office
5 March 1953 – 29 June 1957
Full member of the 14th, 16th, 17th Orgburo
In office
22 March 1939 – 16 October 1952
In office
9 April 1926 – 16 April 1927
Full member of the 16th Secretariat
In office
13 July 1930 – 10 February 1934
Candidate member of the 14th Secretariat
In office
9 April 1926 – 16 April 1927

Personal details
- Born: 7 May 1888 St. Petersburg, Russian Empire
- Died: 24 December 1970 (aged 82) Moscow, Russian SFSR, Soviet Union
- Resting place: Kremlin Wall Necropolis, Moscow
- Party: RSDLP (Bolsheviks) (1905–1918); Russian Communist Party (1918–1966)
- Spouse: Mariya Fedorovna Ulazovskaya

Nikolai Mikhailovich Shvernik (Russian: Николай Михайлович Шверник, 19 May [O.S. 7 May] 1888 – 24 December 1970) was a Soviet politician who served as the second chairman of the Presidium of the Supreme Soviet (head of state) from 1946 until 1953. Though he was the head of state, Shvernik had very little power as Joseph Stalin, the premier at the time, had most of the power due to his position as general secretary of the CPSU, the de facto leader.

== Biography ==
Shvernik was born in 1888 in St. Petersburg in a working-class family of Russian ethnicity. His father was a retired sergeant major, who worked in factories in St Petersburg. Reputedly, he was descended from Old Believers. Shvernik's mother was a weaver. He worked in factories as a turner, and joined the Bolsheviks in 1905. After the February Revolution in 1917, he was elected chairman of the soviet in a pipe factory in Samara, and chairman of the Samara city soviet. During the Russian Civil War, he was a political commissar in the Red Army. In 1921–23, he worked in the trade unions.

In 1923, he was appointed to the staff of Rabkrin, which was headed by Joseph Stalin, whom Shvernik loyally supported during the power struggles of the 1920s. During 1923, he was in charge of combatting the sale of moonshine vodka and cocaine, and gambling. In November 1925, at the height of the conflict between Stalin and Grigory Zinoviev, he was appointed by the Central Committee to take over as Secretary of the Leningrad provincial committee, which was Zinoviev's power base.

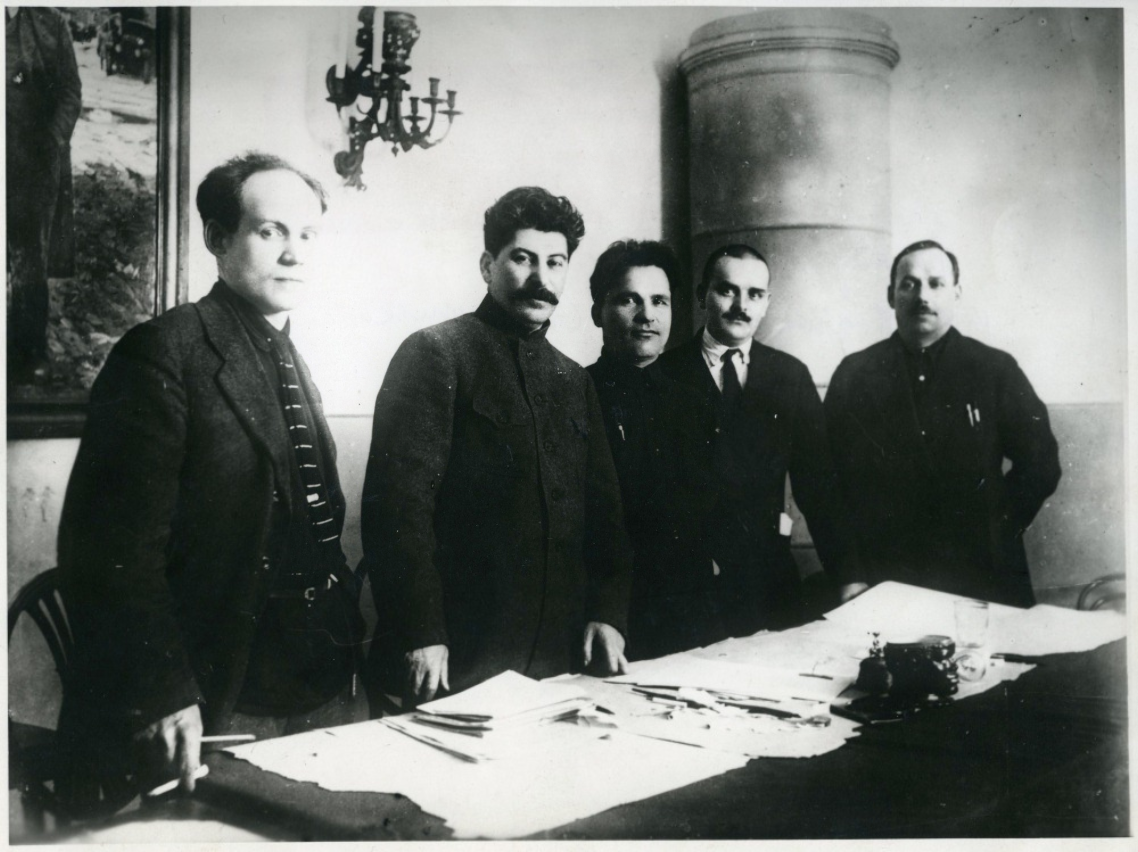
Delegates to the 15th Leningrad Regional Party Conference, 1926 Left to right: Nikolai Antipov, Joseph Stalin, Sergei Kirov, Nikolai Shvernik, and Nicolay Komarov.

Shvernik was a full member of the Central Committee from December 1925 until he died 45 years later. In April 1926, he was appointed to the Secretariat, one of a team of four secretaries led by Stalin, in place of Grigory Yevdokimov, a Zinoviev supporter.

While the Central Committee and Central Control Commission were in joint session, in October 1927, debating whether to expel the leading oppositionists, including Leon Trotsky and Zinoviev, Shvernik displayed his loyalty to Stalin.

In December 1927, when there were sudden food shortages in the cities because the peasants were holding back their produce in anticipation of rising prices, Shvernik was dispatched to the Urals, as regional party secretary. He continued to support Stalin loyally through the rapid industrialisation of the soviet economy, which was opposed by almost the entire leadership of the trade unions. He was recalled to Moscow in 1929, and imposed as chairman of the Metallurgist Trade Union. From July 1930 to March 1944, he was first secretary of the All-Union Central Council of Trade Unions and a member of the Orgburo.

Shvernik presided over the 1931 Menshevik Trial, in which fourteen Russian economists came up for trial on charges of treason. In February 1937, he was a member of the commission that investigated Nikolai Bukharin and Alexei Rykov, the two most prominent former oppositionists still living in the USSR, and voted that they should be expelled from the Central Committee, arrested, and shot.

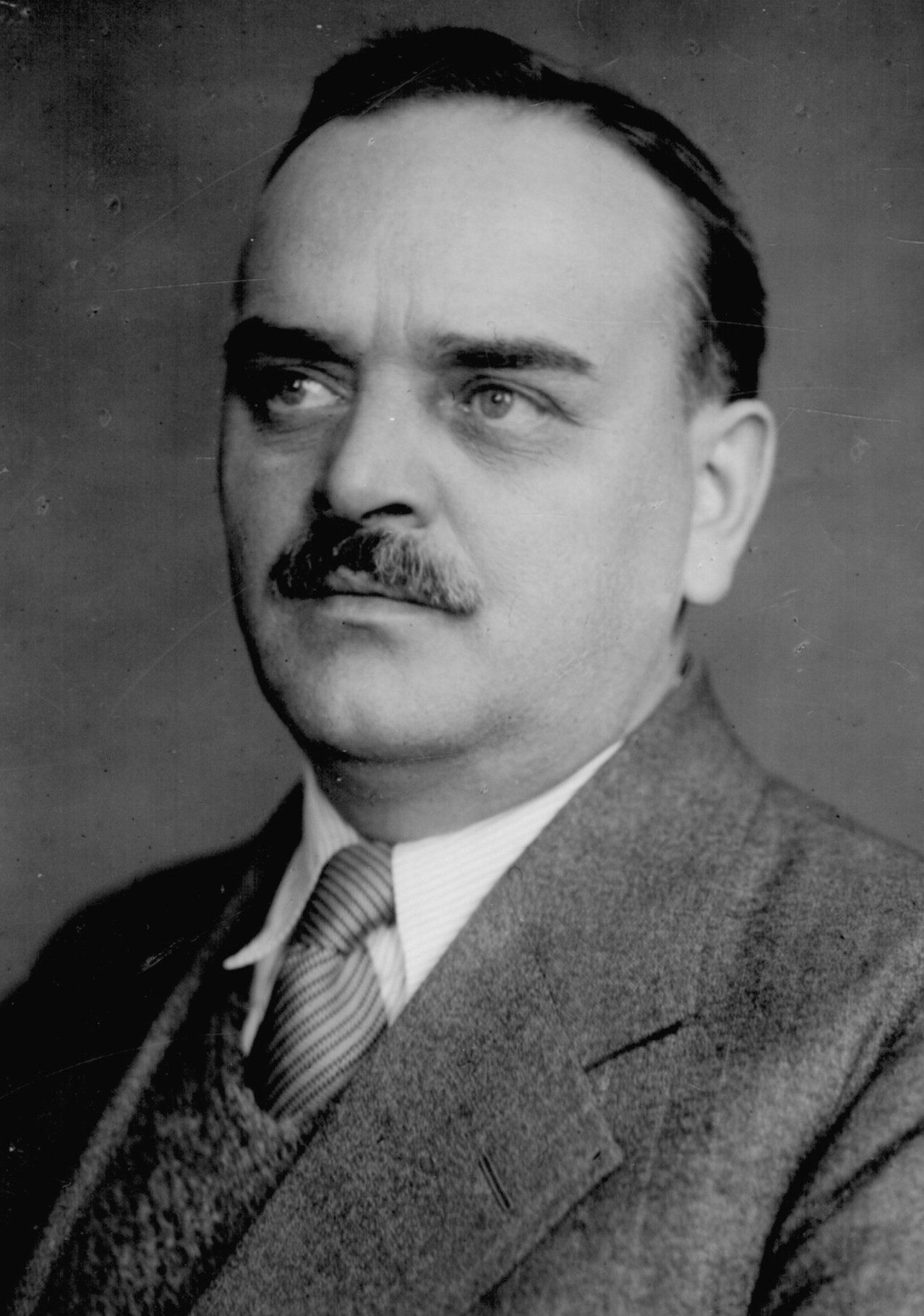
Shvernik in 1938

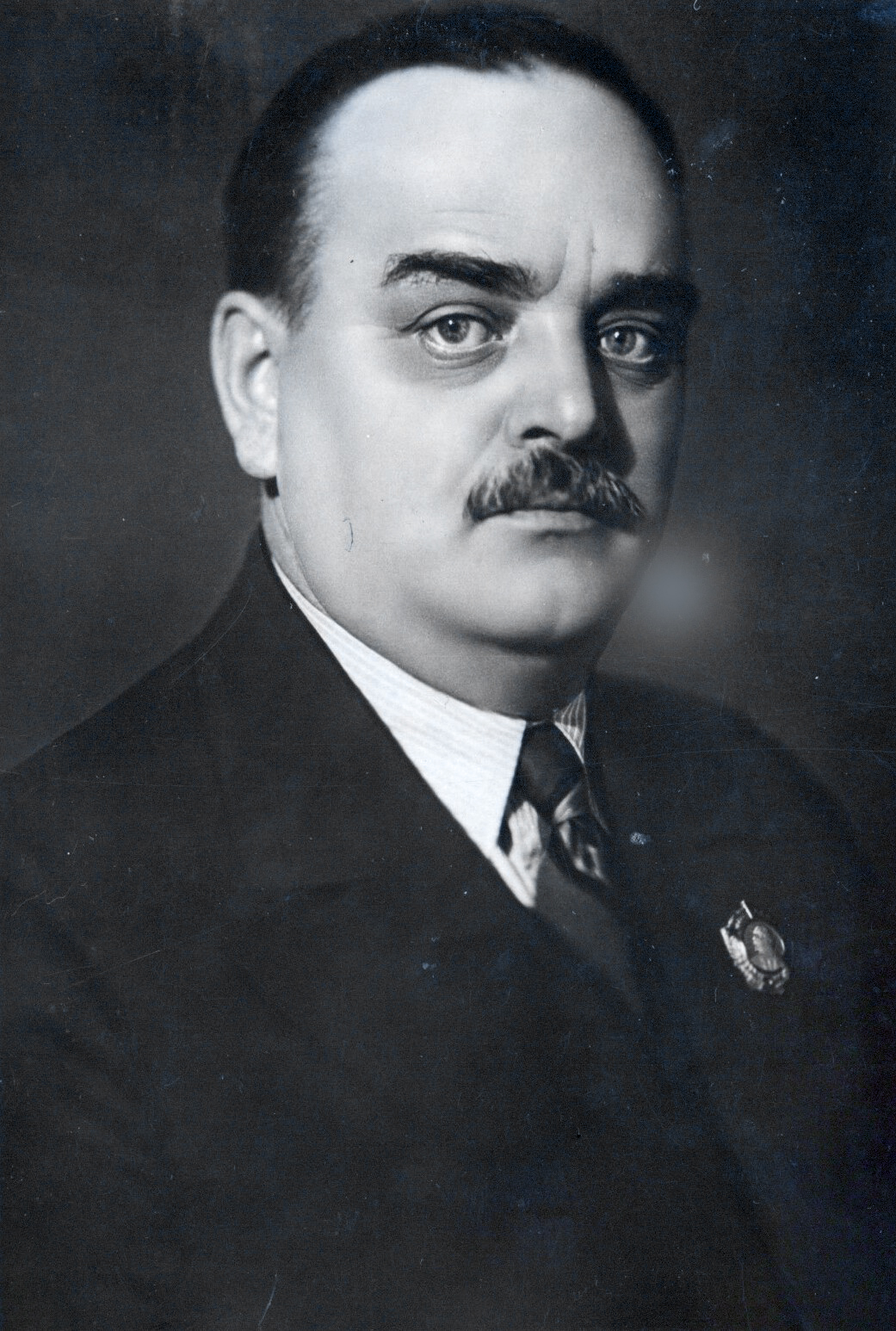
Shvernik in 1941

During the Second World War, Shvernik was responsible for evacuating Soviet industry away from the advancing Wehrmacht. He was Chairman of the Soviet of Nationalities from 1938 to 1946. After creating Extraordinary State Commission for Ascertaining and Investigating Crimes Perpetrated by the German-Fascist Invaders and their Accomplices in 1942, he became chairman of it. He was Chairman of the Presidium of the Supreme Soviet of the Russian SFSR from 1944 to 1946. In 1946 he became Chairman of the Presidium of the Supreme Soviet of the USSR, succeeding Mikhail Kalinin. He only became a member of the Politburo of the CPSU Central Committee (then named the Presidium of the Party's Central Committee) in 1952 but was demoted in 1953 when the body was reduced in size.

Reputedly, Shvernik was so distressed by Stalin's death, in March 1953, that he was the only prominent party leader seen crying at the dictator's funeral. Within days, he had been demoted back to his old status as a 'candidate' member of the Presidium, and Shvernik was removed as the Chairman of the Presidium of the Supreme Soviet and replaced by Kliment Voroshilov on 15 March 1953. He returned to his work as the chairman of the All-Union Central Council of Trade Unions. In December 1953, he was named as a member of the panel of judges who sentenced the former chief of police, Lavrentiy Beria and six others to death.

Despite his years of loyalty to Stalin, Shvernik was one of the most senior Old Bolsheviks to back Nikita Khrushchev after he had delivered the "Secret Speech" which denounced Stalin's crimes. Appointed Chairman of the Central Control Commission in 1956, he oversaw the 'rehabilitation' of scores of people wrongly convicted during the Stalin years. In July 1957, Shvernik again became a full member of the Presidium, after a stretch of more than 16 years as a 'candidate' member. He remained on the body until he retired in 1966.

Shvernik died on 24 December 1970 at Moscow at the age 82 and his ashes were placed in an urn in the Kremlin Wall Necropolis.

== Personal life ==
Nikolai's only biological daughter, Lyudmila (1916–2008) was the first woman in the USSR to graduate from the Zhukovsky Air Force Engineering Academy. Under her leadership, the first soviet domestic television projector, the Ariston, was invented, and she headed a laboratory at the Moscow Scientific Research Television Institute (MNITI). She was married to pilot Stanislav Ganetsky, the son of the disgraced politician Yakov Ganetsky (both were repressed and executed in 1938). Her second marriage was to aircraft engineer Rostislav Belyakov.

In 1942, Shvernik and his wife, Maria Feodorovna, adopted Ziba Ganiyeva, the first Azerbaijani female sniper and a hero of the Great Patriotic War.

== See also ==
- Outline of the Russian Revolution and Civil War
- Bibliography of the Russian Revolution and Civil War
- Bibliography of Stalinism and the Soviet Union
- Index of Old Bolsheviks
- Index of articles related to the Russian Revolution and Civil War

Party political offices
| Preceded by None | Chairman of the Soviet of Nationalities; January 12, 1938 – February 10, 1946 | Succeeded by Vasili Kuznetsov |
| Preceded by Mikhail Kalinin | Chairman of the Presidium of the Supreme Soviet; 1946–1953 | Succeeded by Kliment Voroshilov |
| Preceded by Matvei Shkiryatov | Chairman of the Party Control Committee; 1956–1966 | Succeeded by Arvīds Pelše |
