= Alexander Shelepin =

Soviet politician and intelligence officer; Chairman of the KGB (1958–1961)

- Александр Шелепин
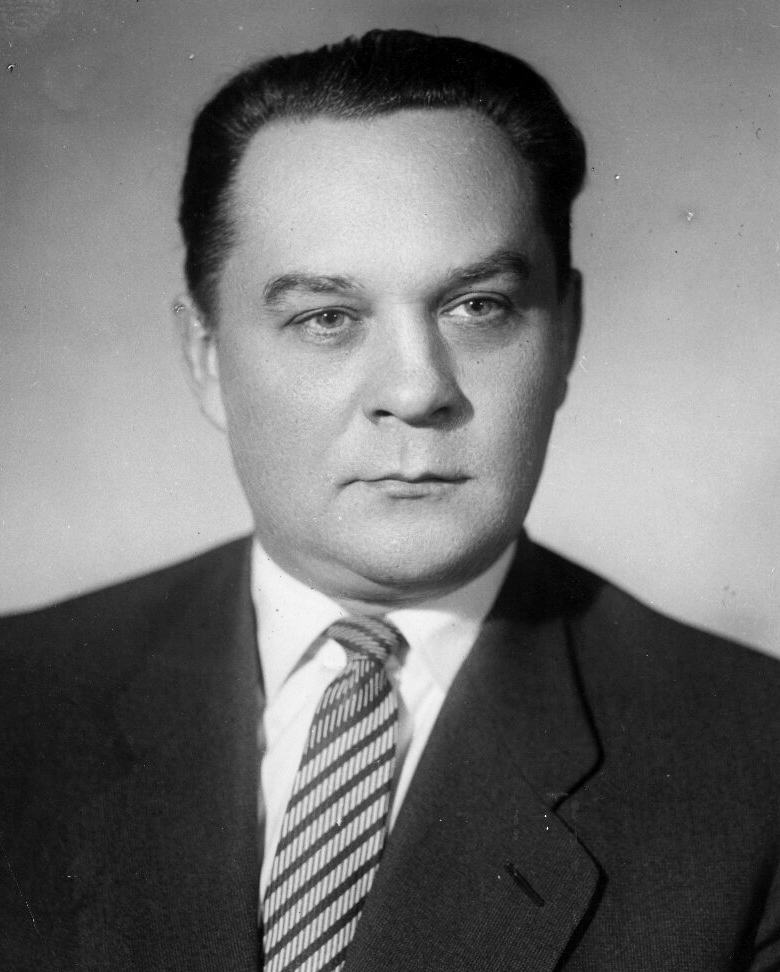
- Shelepin in 1959

Chairman of the All-Union Central Council of Trade Unions
- In office 1967–1975
- Preceded by: Viktor Grishin
- Succeeded by: Alexey Shibaev

Chairman of the Party and State Control Committee
- In office 23 November 1962 – 6 December 1965
- Preceded by: Position established
- Succeeded by: Position abolished

2nd Chairman of the Committee for State Security (KGB)
- In office 25 December 1958 – 13 November 1961
- Premier: Nikita Khrushchev
- Preceded by: Konstantin Lunev
- Succeeded by: Pyotr Ivashutin

Deputy Chairman of the Council of Ministers
- In office 23 November 1962 – 9 December 1965
- Premier: Alexei Kosygin
- Preceded by: Mikhail Yefremov
- Succeeded by: Zia Nureyev

First Secretary of the Komsomol
- In office 30 October 1952 – 28 March 1958
- Preceded by: Nikolai Mikhailov
- Succeeded by: Vladimir Semichastny

Full member of the 22nd, 23rd, 24th Politburo
- In office 16 November 1964 – 16 April 1975

Member of the 22nd, 23rd Secretariat
- In office 31 October 1961 – 26 September 1967

Personal details
- Born: Alexander Nikolayevich Shelepin; 18 August 1918 Voronezh, Russian Soviet Federative Socialist Republic
- Died: 24 October 1994 (aged 76) Moscow, Russia
- Citizenship: Soviet (until 1991) and Russian
- Party: Communist Party of the Soviet Union (1940–1984)
- Education: Moscow State University (1941)
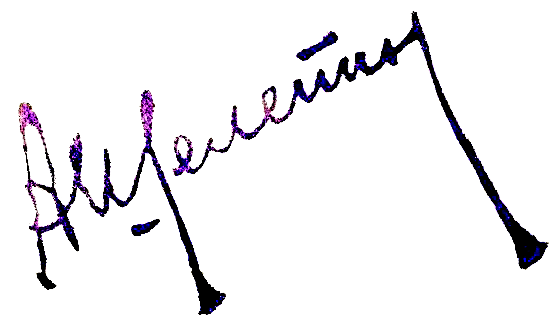
- Signature

Military service
- Allegiance: USSR
- Years of service: 1939–1940
- Rank: Private
- Battles/wars: World War II; Winter War

Alexander Nikolayevich Shelepin (Russian: Алекса́ндр Никола́евич Шеле́пин; 18 August 1918 – 24 October 1994) was a Soviet politician and intelligence officer. A long-time member of the Central Committee of the Communist Party of the Soviet Union, Shelepin served as a First Deputy Premier, a full member of the Politburo and as the chairman of the KGB from December 1958 to November 1961. Even after ostensibly leaving the KGB, he continued to hold considerable influence over the agency well until 1967 through his protégé, Vladimir Semichastny, who succeeded him as KGB Chairman.

Ambitious and well-educated, Alexander Shelepin was the leader of a hard-line faction within the Communist Party that played a decisive role in ousting Soviet premier and First Secretary, Nikita Khrushchev, in 1964. Opposed to the policy of détente, he was eventually outmaneuvered by Leonid Brezhnev and gradually stripped of his power, thus failing in his ambition to lead the Soviet Union.

== Early life ==
Alexander Shelepin was born in Voronezh on 18 August 1918 to a middle-class family, the son of Nikolai Shelepin, a railway official. A talented student, he graduated from the Moscow Institute of Philosophy and then obtained a master's degree from the Moscow Institute of History. He started his political career in the Communist Youth League (Komsomol) while still a student, and already in his teens he had expressed his desire to become a party leader.

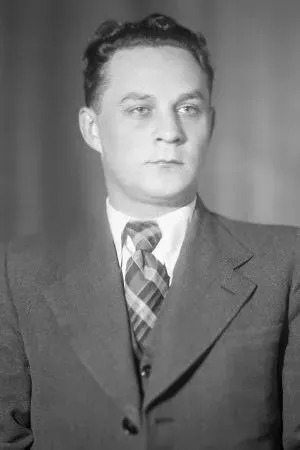
Shelepin in 1949

== World War II and service under Stalin ==
Shelepin briefly served in the Red Army in 1940, during the last stages of the Winter War against Finland, and after the Nazi invasion in 1941, he helped organize the guerrilla partisan movement in the Moscow region; after the notorious execution by the Nazis of Zoya Kosmodemyanskaya (whom Shelepin had personally selected), he caught the eye of Joseph Stalin himself, and his political fortune was made. He became a senior official of the Komsomol, working in the All-Union Secretariat in Moscow, and was then named General Secretary of the World Federation of Democratic Youth, an international youth organization recognized by the United Nations and granted general consultative status with the United Nations Economic and Social Council. In 1952, in one of Stalin's last personnel reshuffles, Shelepin became First Secretary of the All-Union Komsomol.

== Service under Khrushchev ==
Though closely identified with Stalin (and being somewhat of a favorite of his), Shelepin was not affected by De-Stalinization and the gradual consolidation of power by Nikita Khrushchev after Stalin's death in 1953. Indeed, Khrushchev personally liked Shelepin and, because of his rise through the Communist Youth League, saw him as an ally against the secret police and security agencies that had been all-powerful under Stalin. Shelepin accompanied Khrushchev on the Soviet leader's trip to the People's Republic of China in 1954, and met with Mao Zedong. Following this, he mobilized thousands of young communists in support of Khrushchev's ‘Virgin Lands’ program.

In early 1958, Khrushchev appointed Shelepin as Central Committee Secretary in charge of the Party Organs Department, and, in December 1958, Shelepin became the Chairman of the Soviet central intelligence and security service, the KGB, replacing Army General Ivan Serov. Khrushchev saw Shelepin as a very good choice for KGB chief, for several reasons; Shelepin's background completely outside state security, his higher education and intellectual approach greatly distinguished him from his predecessors, and his appointment was intended to improve the public image of the KGB.

Shelepin attempted to return state security and intelligence to its position of importance during the Stalinist era. However, the people he favored were completely different from those preferred by his predecessors. With Khrushchev's full backing, Shelepin recruited many young university graduates to the KGB (especially favoring those with a background in law and the social sciences) and he demoted or fired many career state security officers, replacing them with officials from Communist Party organizations, and, especially, from the Communist Youth League. As a result of Shelepin's ambitious policy, the KGB became a substantially different organization from the Stalin-era security services, with a more sophisticated and intellectual approach, that would be further encouraged by future Chairman Yuri Andropov.

Shelepin proposed and carried out the destruction of many documents related to the Katyn massacre of Polish officers to minimize the chance that the truth would be revealed. His 3 March 1959 note to Nikita Khrushchev, with information about the execution of 21,857 Poles and with the proposal to destroy their personal files, became one of the documents that were preserved and eventually made public.

The policy of providing KGB support to left-wing nationalist liberation movements in wars of national liberation in Latin America, Asia and Africa was another important innovation of Shelepin's new approach as KGB Chairman, adopted during the summer of 1961 by Khrushchev and the Central Committee following a detailed proposal by Shelepin. Fidel Castro and Cuba strongly supported an aggressive policy of military assistance to national liberation movements with Che Guevara, in co-operation with Ben Bella of Algeria, also playing a leading role.

== Coup against Khrushchev ==
Shelepin left the KGB in November 1961 on being promoted to a position as Secretary of the Central Committee, from where he still exercised control over the KGB, which was taken over by his client and protégé Vladimir Semichastny. He also had powers of supervision over justice and transport. In 1962, Khrushchev also made him chairman of the powerful new Committee of Party and State Control, and First Deputy Prime Minister.

He was a principal player in the coup against Khrushchev in October 1964, obviously influencing the KGB to support the conspirators.

Shelepin's reward was to be made a full member of the most important political body, the Politburo, in November 1964, following the successful overthrow of Khrushchev —by a significant margin its youngest member, at the age of 46. He was also the only Politburo member who was simultaneously a member of the secretariat, and of the Council of Ministers.

Shelepin probably expected to become First Secretary and de facto leader of the USSR. He controlled the KGB and led a large hard-line faction within the Party. Alexander Solzhenitsyn suggested that Shelepin had been the choice of the surviving Stalinists, who asked "what had been the point of overthrowing Khrushchev if not to revert to Stalinism?"

As far as his own views on the role of Soviet policy went, Shelepin opposed the relaxation of tensions with the United States in foreign affairs, and favored a return to domestic policies that promoted discipline and centralization within the wider Union.

However, he lacked influence in the military, and was viewed very suspiciously by most Central Committee and Government officials outside his faction, who were well-aware of his ambitions.

== Fall from power ==
Shelepin's colleagues on the Politburo watched him carefully, seeking to halt his ambitions. The first blow was the abolition of the Party-State Control Committee in December 1965, as a result of which he lost his status as Deputy prime minister. From 1965 to 1970 witnessed the systematic dismissal of his most powerful allies within the Party and Government.

In May 1967, Shelepin underwent an emergency operation on his appendix, which kept him in hospital for eight days. In his absence, the Politburo decided, after a discussion lasting ten minutes, to sack his ally, Semichastny, and appointed Yuri Andropov Chairman of the KGB. In July 1967, Shelepin was ousted from his position as a party secretary, and demoted to the chairmanship of All-Union Trade Union Council, though he survived as a full member of the Politburo.

In April 1975, he visited Great Britain at the invitation of the TUC, but cut short his visit after two days, instead of the planned four days, because of hostile demonstrations that he blamed on 'Zionists', though it is unlikely that many of the protestors were Jews, because it was Passover. He was removed from the Politburo upon his return, on 16 April. On 22 May 1975, it was announced that he had resigned from his position as Chairman of the Trade Union council. He was deputy chairman of the USSR State Committee for Vocational Education until he retired in 1984.

Brezhnev was able to outmaneuver Shelepin, as his approach was more nuanced and more acceptable to the average Party official. Shelepin wanted centralization, discipline and strict oversight of officials domestically, and confrontation on all fronts with the United States abroad; whereas Brezhnev was happy to offer predictability, stability and job security to the party officials, and pursue a balanced foreign policy, combining détente with proxy wars.

Shelepin died in Moscow on 24 October 1994, at the age of 76, and was buried in the Novodevichy Cemetery.

== Honours and awards ==
- Four Orders of Lenin
- Order of the Red Banner of Labour
- Order of the Patriotic War 2nd class
- Order of the Red Star
- Medal "For the Defence of Moscow"
- Medal "For Valiant Labour in the Great Patriotic War 1941–1945"
- Medal "Partisan of the Patriotic War" 1st class

Government offices
Preceded by Ivan Serov	Chairman of Committee of State Security; 25 December 1958 – 13 November 1961	Succeeded by Vladimir Semichastny
