= Gennady Voronov =

Soviet-Russian statesman

- Геннадий Воронов
- Voronov in 1971

Chairman of the Council of Ministers of the Russian SFSR
- In office 23 November 1962 – 23 July 1971
- President: Nikolai Organov; Nikolai Ignatov; Mikhail Yasnov
- Preceded by: Dmitry Polyansky
- Succeeded by: Mikhail Solomentsev

Full member of the 22nd, 23rd, 24th Politburo
- In office 31 October 1961 – 27 April 1973

Candidate member of the 20th Politburo
- In office 18 October – 31 October 1961

Personal details
- Born: 31 August 1910 Rameshki, Tver Governorate, Russian Empire
- Died: 1 April 1994 (aged 83) Moscow, Russia
- Party: Communist Party of the Soviet Union

Gennady Ivanovich Voronov (Russian: Генна́дий Ива́нович Во́ронов; 31 August [O.S. 18 August] 1910 – 1 April 1994) was a Soviet-Russian statesman who was from 1962 to 1971 the Chairman of the Council of Ministers of the Russian SFSR, literally meaning Premier or Prime Minister.

== Biography ==
Voronov was born in Tver province, Russia, the son of a teacher. Trained as an electrician, he graduated from an Industrial Institute in 1936. In 1937, during the Great Purge, when mass arrests created vacancies for new party officials, he was appointed head of the Agitprop department at district level in Tomsk. In 1939, he was appointed second secretary, and in 1948, First Secretary of the Chita regional party committee. He was a member of the Central Committee in 1952-76. In May 1955, the head of the soviet communist party, Nikita Khrushchev had him transferred to Moscow as Director of Egg Farming in the USSR Ministry of Agriculture. While Khrushchev was engaged in a power struggle with Georgy Malenkov and others, Voronov showed his loyalty by signing a written statement demanding that Malenkov and five others should be sacked and subjected to an investigation to consider whether they should be expelled from the party. In 1957-61, he was First Secretary of the Orenburg regional party committee.

In January 1961, Voronov was recalled to Moscow and appointed a candidate member of the Presidium (or Politburo and deputy chairman of the bureau in charge of the communist party in the RSFSR. He was promoted to the post of 'prime minister' of the RSFSR in December 1962. His specialist field was agriculture. According to the journalist Michel Tatu, who was based in Moscow at the time:

Voronov became known for his authoritarian methods in agriculture. He did all he could to impose the so-called Orenburg system of soil management ... an attitude which, a few years later, was reprehended under the name shablon ie. the use of authoritarian methods to enforce hidebound directives."

A former party official who worked with Voronov described him of sounding like a "mannered provincial lecturer" than a high ranking statesman, who "talked a lot about attention to agriculture, especially animal husbandry, tediously."

At the Central Committee plenum which removed Khrushchev from office, Voronov complained that he had not been allowed to express an opinion for three and a half years without being shouted at by Khrushchev, who considered himself an expert on agriculture. When Khrushchev tried to defend himself, Voronov shouted at him "You have no friends here!"

But his relations with the new General Secretary, Leonid Brezhnev were no better. They clashed on a series of matters, including the decision to invade Czechoslovakia in 1968, which Voronov opposed. In 1971, he was removed from office and relegated to the lesser position of Chairman of the USSR People's Control Committee. He resigned in April 1973, and was removed from the Politburo, and retired on a pension.

== Awards ==
Voronov was awarded two Orders of Lenin.
