= Sharof Rashidov =

Soviet Uzbek politician

- Шароф Рашидов

First Secretary of Communist Party of Uzbekistan
- In office 15 March 1959 – 31 October 1983
- Preceded by: Sobir Kamolov
- Succeeded by: Inomjon Usmonxo‘jayev

Chairman of the Presidium of the Supreme Soviet of the Uzbek Soviet Socialist Republic
- In office 21 August 1950 – 24 March 1959
- Preceded by: Sobir Kamolov
- Succeeded by: Amin Niyazov or Yadgar Nasriddinova

Candidate member of the 22nd, 23rd, 24th, 25th, 26th Politburo
- In office 31 October 1961 – 31 October 1983

Full member of the 22nd, 23rd, 24th, 25th, 26th Central Committee
- In office 31 October 1961 – 31 October 1983

Personal details
- Born: 6 November 1917 Jizzakh, Samarkand Oblast, Russian Republic (present-day Uzbekistan)
- Died: 31 October 1983 (aged 65) Ellikqala District, Karakalpak ASSR, Uzbek SSR, Soviet Union
- Party: Communist Party of the Soviet Union (from 1939)
- Children: Sayyora Rashidova

Sharof Rashidovich Rashidov (Uzbek Cyrillic: Шароф Рашидович Рашидов, [ʃæˈrɒf ræˈʃidəvʲɪt͡ɕ ræˈʃidəf]; Russian: Шараф Рашидович Рашидов, romanized: Sharaf Rashidovich Rashidov; 6 November [O.S. 24 October] 1917 – 31 October 1983) was the First Secretary of the Central Committee of the Communist Party of Uzbekistan from 1959 until his death in 1983. During his tenure the Uzbek SSR saw considerable economic growth and had a very high degree of autonomy from the rest of the Soviet Union.

== Early life ==
Rashidov was born on 6 November [O.S. 24 October] 1917, the day before the Russian Revolution. He was born to an Uzbek peasant family in Sovungarlik village, located in what is now the Jizzakh region of Uzbekistan. Although his family was poor, both of his parents were among the few that were literate at the time, and they wanted their six children to be educated. Sharof Rashidov's father, Rashid Khalilov, was a farmer who joined the Qizil karvon kolkhoz, and his mother Kuysinoy was a housewife.

Initially after graduating from the Jizzakh Pedagogical College in 1935 he worked as a schoolteacher in a secondary school before starting to work for the regional Samarkand newspaper Leninsky put. He then graduated from the philological faculty of Samarkand State University in 1941, but later that year he was deployed to the Eastern Front as a junior lieutenant. He saw combat in the Battle of Moscow and was awarded two Order of the Red Star before being demobilized in 1943 after being severely wounded in the war. Having returned to Uzbekistan, he worked as editor of the Lenin yoli newspaper of Samarkand from 1943 to 1944, then became the secretary of the Samarkand regional committee before worked as the executive editor Qizil Oʻzbekistoni from 1947-1949. He also was a student of the All-Union Party School under the Central Committee of the Party, graduating in absentia in 1948.

== Political career ==
In 1947 he began his career as a deputy in the Supreme Soviet of the Uzbek SSR, where he served as a deputy in the 2nd to 9th convocations. He also served as a delegate to the 19th to 24th Congresses of the Communist party. In 1949 he became the chairman of the board of the Union of Writers of the Uzbek SSR, but moved on from the post in 1950, as he became the chairman of the Presidium of the Supreme Soviet of the Uzbek SSR, which he held until 1959. He continued to rise in power, becoming a candidate member of the Central Committee of the Communist party in 1956. In March 1959 he became the First Secretary of the Central Committee of the Communist Party of Uzbekistan, a post he held until his death in 1983. In 1961 he became a member of the Central Committee of the Communist party as well as a candidate member of the Presidium of the Central Committee.

== Leadership of Uzbekistan ==
=== Politics ===
Rashidov was the de facto leader of the Samarkand faction of Uzbek politics, which encountered rivalry from other factions, especially the Tashkent faction. After coming to power in 1959 he began a series of purges of Tashkent-aligned politicians from leadership positions in the Uzbek SSR. In 1969 Yadgar Nasriddinova of the Tashkent faction, Rafiq Nishonov of the Fergana faction, and Rahmonqul Qurbonov of the Bukhara faction attempted to depose him from his position as first secretary, utilizing an anti-Russian rally at a sports event as a pretext to get Moscow to reject him. However, Rashidov prevailed, and the leaders of the plot lost their power in Uzbek SSR politics, with Nasriddinova and Nishonov getting union-level positions but Qurbonov facing imprisonment.

Rashidov had strong support from Brezhnev, who in turn allocated resources to projects industrializing the Uzbek SSR and protected him from investigation. For decades, the Uzbek SSR had an extremely high degree of autonomy compared to other republics in the union. While other Soviet politicians of similar status feared the KGB and Communist Party apparatuses giving such entities a great degree of control, those very same institutions based in Uzbek SSR feared Rashidov, whose close ties to Brezhnev enabled him to deviate from party norms far more than other politicians. People who expressed disagreement with Rashidov faced severe retaliation, as Rashidov maintained a network of informers using a "divide and conquer" method to ensure loyalty to him from his associates. His opponents likened him to a Khan of the previous century for the amount of control he exercised over the republic.

=== Projects ===
During Rashidov's tenure, the Uzbek SSR experienced rapid economic growth, not only in the agricultural sector but also urbanization and industrialization. The Tashkent Aviation Production Association named after V.P. Chkalov became one of the largest aircraft producers in the world; in 1969 the Muruntau mine began extraction of gold, which became one of the most important mines in the Soviet Union.

After the devastating earthquake of 1966, the city of Tashkent was rebuilt and experienced significant urbanization, with the construction of the Tashkent Metro and expansion of the city as well as other socially oriented construction projects throughout the republic.

Another project of Rashidov was the Mubarek zone, a plan to push exiled Crimeans to “take root” in the desolate Mubarek district of the Qashqadaryo Region. The Mubarek district was absolutely nothing like the coastal Crimean homeland that Crimean Tatars had been longing for and the climate was inhospitable. Most Crimean Tatars grew to see the project as a way for Rashidov to fleece Moscow of money and found the suggestions that anywhere in Central Asia was their "real" homeland to be chauvinist.

=== Diplomacy ===
In 1957, Rashidov accompanied Kliment Voroshilov on a diplomatic trip to visit Indonesia, Burma, China, and Vietnam, where he met with leaders of anti-colonial movements. Although his first visits to Cuba dealt with agricultural matters, in 1962 he was part of a Soviet delegation to Cuba sent by Khrushchev in the prelude to the Cuban missile crisis.

During the Indo-Pakistani war of 1965, Rashidov was instrumental in the organization of peace talks in Tashkent, where the two countries signed the Tashkent Declaration peace agreement in 1966. While the negotiations were officially led by Alexei Kosygin, Rashidov was more involved in the peace process.

During the Soviet invasion of Afghanistan, Rashidov welcomed Afghan students to study at universities in the Uzbek SSR and frequently corresponded with government bodies of the Democratic Republic of Afghanistan, emphasizing his support of their endeavors.

=== Culture ===
Under Rashidov, in 1966, the capital of Uzbekistan, Tashkent, was rebuilt, and new museums, parks, theaters, and monuments were erected. In 1970, the 2500th anniversary of Samarkand was celebrated, and in this connection great events were held in Samarkand, a museum of the city's history and an opera and ballet theater were opened. In 1977, for the first time in Central Asia, a subway was opened in Tashkent.

In 1969, an international symposium on the history of art of the Timurid period was held in Samarkand. In 1973, the 1000th anniversary of the famous scholar Abu Rayhan Al-Biruni was widely celebrated and a feature film was made.

The number of research institutes in Uzbekistan under Rashidov's leadership increased from 64 in 1960 to 100 in the early 1980s. Rashidov initiated the first Institute of Archaeology in Central Asia, which opened in 1970 in Samarkand.

In 1970, there were 192 students for every 10,000 people in Uzbekistan.

In 1970-1980, with Rashidov's support, three large historical series were filmed in Uzbekistan: "Ulugbek's Treasures" based on Odil Yoqubov's work, a 10-part video film "Alisher Navoi" based on Aybek's novel, and a 17-part series "Roads of Fire" based on Komil Yashin's novel. For the first time, large feature historical films were made about the geniuses of world science born in the territory of modern Uzbekistan: Avicenna "Youth of Genius", about Ulugh Beg "The star of Ulugbek".

In 1966, a cartoon production workshop was established at the Uzbekfilm studio. In 1968, the first Uzbek drawn cartoon, "Brave Sparrow", was published. In the mid-70s, the animation workshop became a union of puppet and drawn cartoons. Cartoons such as "The Ballad of the Falcon and the Star" by Mavzur Mahmudov and "Lake in the Desert" by Nazim Tulahojaev, and "Hoja Nasreddin" were made.

Rashidov actively supported young poets and writers in Uzbekistan. Under him, such outstanding poets as Erkin Vohidov (author of the poem "O'zbegim") and Abdulla Oripov (author of the poem "O'zbekiston") contributed to Uzbek culture.

Many museums were opened: the Alisher Navoi State Museum of Literature, the Sadriddin Ayni House Museum, the Abu Ali Ibn Sina Museum in Afshona, the Lenin Museum in Tashkent and others. In 1980, on the initiative of Rashidov, the 100th anniversary of the birth of Uzbek and Tajik poet Orif Gulhani was celebrated and the Gulhani Museum was opened in Samarkand. In addition, an important aspect of cultural policy was the creation of three museum-reserves: "Itchan Kala" in Khiva (1968), Samarkand United Historical-Architectural and Art Museum-Reserve (1982) and Bukhara State Architectural Art Museum-Preserve (1983).

Under the leadership of Rashidov, historians wrote and published in 1967-1970 in Uzbek and Russian languages a four-volume "History of Uzbekistan". After Rashidov's death, multi-volume general histories of Uzbekistan were no longer published, with the exception of separate volumes on individual periods.

== Corruption ==
=== Nepotism ===
While the CPSU was well aware of Rashidov's corruption and nepotism, they initially chose to overlook it. With thousands of complaint letters sent to central bodies complaining about widespread corruption and bribery in the Uzbek SSR, the central government began to investigate Rashidov and his cadres more seriously. Eventually Rashidov was summoned by Ligachev, who showed him the stacks of letters from citizens of the Uzbek SSR complaining about his corruption. Rashidov responded by asking Ligachev who he thought he was, and Ligachev informed him that he was bringing up the issue on behalf of Yuri Andropov, to which Rashidov replied by claiming the letters to be slander, to which Ligachev informed him that he was subject to investigation and if the allegations were false that he would have nothing to worry about.

=== Cotton scandal ===
With orders from Moscow to grow increasing quantities of cotton, the government of the Uzbek SSR under Rashidov responded by reporting artificially inflated statistics for growth in land irrigated and harvested, boasting of record improvements in production and efficiency. However, there was a huge disparity in the amount of cotton that the Uzbek SSR claimed to produce compared to what was actually produced. The huge push from Moscow to increase cotton production played a huge role in the ecological devastation that the republic, especially the Karakalpakstan region. The rivers that fed the Aral Sea were diverted to irrigate cotton fields, causing the sea to recede. As the ecological situation worsened, cotton production declined, yet Moscow kept demanding more cotton. An intricate system of tribute, bribes, and forgery were used to create the illusion of fulfilling cotton quotas. The Uzbek leadership used these exaggerated figures to transfer substantial amounts of wealth from central Soviet funds into the Uzbek SSR and the Rashidov family. Brezhnev turned a blind eye to the situation, as his son-in-law was implicated in the scandal. After the death of Brezhnev, Andropov, who was aware of the scheme, began dismantling the “cotton mafia”, and eventually the scandal was made officially acknowledged.

== Personal life ==
=== Family ===
Rashidov was married to Khursanda G'furovna Rashidova, and they had five children. Their son Ilkhom was married to the daughter of Qallibek Kamolov, first secretary of the Karakalpak ASSR. One of Rashidov's daughters was married to the nephew of Ibrohim Muminov of the Bukhara faction, who held the post of vice president of the Academy of Sciences of the Uzbek SSR and solidifying ties of the Samarkand-Bukhara grouping. His brother Sahib was head of the People's Inspectorate. His wife's nephew was rector of the Tashkent medical institute. In total, Rashidov put at least fourteen of his relatives in important positions in the government of the Uzbek SSR, although the exact number of relatives throughout the government remains unclear.

=== Religion ===
While Uzbekistan is Muslim-majority, Rashidov lived a secular lifestyle as was expected of Soviet leaders and maintained that he was an atheist, and referred to religion as superstition. However, he was very tolerant of religion in the republic, and allowed for not only the development of religious institutions but also public celebrations of religious nature, rendering Tashkent a key center of Islam in the Soviet Union. In September 1980 a major international conference marking the anniversary of the Hijra was held in Tashkent. During his tenure many mosques that were converted by previous administrations for secular purposes such as gyms and warehouses were restored.

=== Literature ===
Rashidov's first work, the epic “Chegarachi” was published in 1937. In 1945 his collection of poems about the Great Patriotic War (World War II). This was followed by the short story “Gʻoliblar” about development of unused lands. He then wrote the novels "Boʻrondan kuchli“, “Qudratli toʻlqin” and “Gʻoliblar”, published in 1958, 1964, and 1972 respectively.

== Death and legacy ==
Rashidov died on 31 October 1983 while visiting the Karakalpak ASSR. Most sources indicate that he died of a heart attack, with many suggesting that the stress of the ongoing corruption investigation into him played a role, but some accounts allege that his death was suicide to avoid facing corruption charges. He was succeeded by Inomjon Usmonxoʻjayev.

While he was initially eulogized after his death, criticism of Rashidov was soon not only permitted but done by senior politicians in both Moscow and Tashkent. Although he was originally buried in Tashkent's Lenin Square, although after the cotton scandal received more attention and he began to face more damnatio memoriae, his remains were disinterred from the square in 1986 and reburied in his hometown instead.

After independence from the Soviet Union, Rashidov's image was rehabilitated by Islam Karimov and Rashidov became celebrated as a symbol of Uzbek nationalism. Sharof Rashidov District was named in his honor. While the cotton scandal was seen as a shame by Russians, Uzbeks largely supported Rashidov not in spite of it but rather because of it, as it became seen as a triumph over Moscow and many saw his corruption as beneficial to the republic and serving Uzbek interests.

In Jizzakh there is a museum dedicated to his memory.

== Awards ==
- Twice Hero of Socialist Labour (30 December 1974 and 4 November 1977)
- Ten Orders of Lenin (16 January 1950, 11 January 1957, 1 March 1965, 4 November 1967, 2 December 1971, 10 December 1973, 30 December 1974, 25 December 1976, 4 November 1977, 6 March 1980)
- Order of the October Revolution (5 March 1982)
- Order of the Red Banner of Labour (6 December 1951)
- Two Orders of the Red Star (28 August 1942 and 23 January 1946)
- Order of the Badge of Honour (25 December 1944)
- Lenin Prize (1980)
- State Prize of the Republic of Uzbekistan named after Alisher Navoi in the field of architecture (4 February 1994)

Party political offices
Preceded by Sobir Kamolov	General Secretary of the Communist Party of the Uzbek SSR; 1959–1983	Succeeded by Inomjon Usmonxo‘jayev
