= Viktor Grishin =

Soviet politician (1914–1992)

- Виктор Гришин
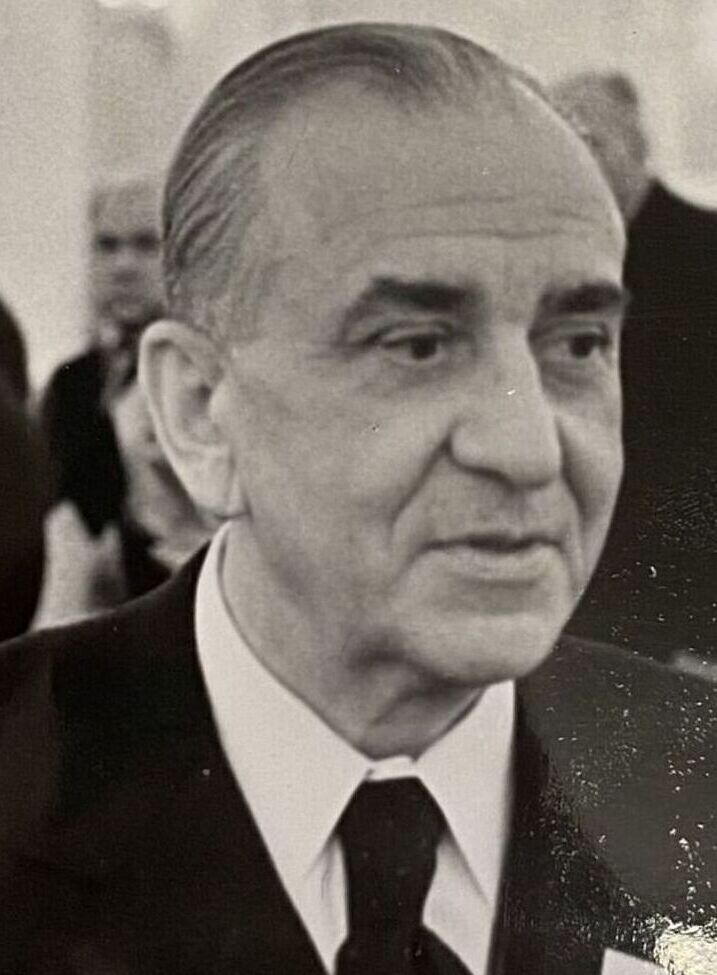

First Secretary of the Moscow City Committee of the Communist Party
- In office 27 June 1967 – 24 December 1985
- Preceded by: Nikolai Yegorychev
- Succeeded by: Boris Yeltsin

Chairman of the All-Union Central Council of Trade Unions
- In office 17 March 1956 – 11 July 1967
- Preceded by: Nikolai Shvernik
- Succeeded by: Alexander Shelepin

Full member of the 24th, 25th, 26th Politburo
- In office 9 April 1971 – 18 February 1986

Candidate member of the 22nd, 23rd Politburo
- In office 31 October 1961 – 9 April 1971

Full member of the 19th, 20th, 22nd, 23rd, 24th, 25th, 26th Central Committee
- In office 16 October 1952 – 6 March 1986

Personal details
- Born: Viktor Vasilyevich Grishin; 18 September [O.S. 5 September] 1914 Serpukhov, Moscow Governorate, Russian Empire
- Died: 25 May 1992 (aged 77) Moscow, Russia
- Party: Communist Party of the Soviet Union (1939–1986)

Viktor Vasilyevich Grishin (Russian: Ви́ктор Васи́льевич Гри́шин; 18 September [O.S. 5 September] 1914 – 25 May 1992) was a Soviet politician. He was a candidate (1961–1971) and full member (1971–1986) of the Politburo of the Central Committee of the Communist Party of the Soviet Union.

== Biography ==
Born in Serpukhov (in the Moscow Governorate of the Russian Empire), Grishin worked in his early years on the Moscow railroad as a spike driver, retrofitting its railway system. He served in the Red Army from 1938 until 1940. In 1941, he was a Communist party functionary. He eventually rose to become leader of the Communist party in the city of Moscow from 1967 until 1985. He became renowned for his hardline stance.

During the final months of Konstantin Chernenko's life, pundits regarded Grishin as a possible contender to succeed Chernenko as General Secretary — as a possible alternative to Mikhail Gorbachev. In an attempt to stress his closeness to Chernenko, Grishin dragged the terminally-ill Soviet leader out to vote in early 1985. This action backfired and was almost universally viewed as a cruel act. After Chernenko's death (10 March 1985), he declined to put himself forward as a candidate for succession and instead offered his support, albeit lukewarm, to Gorbachev. On 11 March 1985 an extraordinary session of the plenum of the Central Committee of the CPSU unanimously elected Gorbachev as the General Secretary.

In late-December 1985, Boris Yeltsin took over from Grishin as the First Secretary of the Moscow party committee. On 18 February 1986, Grishin lost his position as a member of the Politburo.

In a 1991 interview with the conservative Russian magazine Molodaya Gvardiya, he claimed that the only reason he lost was because "younger Party leaders, such as Yegor Ligachev, supported Gorbachev because they feared that if I had become Party boss, they would lose their posts."

== Death ==
On 25 May 1992, Grishin died at the age of 77. He suffered a heart attack at a welfare office in Moscow, where he went to register an increase in his state pension.

Party political offices
Preceded by Nikolay Yegorychev	First Secretary of the Moscow Communist Party; 4 October 1967 – 23 December 1985	Succeeded by Boris Yeltsin
