= Central Control Commission of the Communist Party of the Soviet Union =

Disciplinary body within the CPSU

The Central Control Commission (Russian: Центральная Контрольная Комиссия, Tsentral'naya Kontrol'naya Komissiya) was a supreme disciplinary body (since 1934 within the Central Committee) of the Communist Party of the Soviet Union, also known as the Party Control Commission (1934–1952) and the Party Control Committee (1952–1990). Its members were elected at the Party Congress or the plenary sessions of the Central Committee.

== History and function ==
At first there was a single Control Commission, which in 1921 was divided into the Central Auditing Commission, responsible for financial control, and the Central Control Commission, responsible for controlling party discipline. The Party Control Committee oversaw the party discipline of the Party members and candidate Party members in terms of their observance of the programme and regulations of the Party, state discipline and Party ethics. It administered punishments, including expulsions from the Party. The Party Control Committee also considered the appeals of Party members punished by their local Party organizations.

According to the Charter, the composition of the Central Control Commission was elected by the Party Congress; members of the Central Control Commission could not be simultaneously members of the Central Committee. The local control bodies of the RCP (b) were regional control commissions, district control commissions, city control commissions, etc.

The activities of the party control bodies largely helped not only to reduce the number of violators of party and ethical norms in the party, but also to somewhat improve the poor quality of the management system. An important element of party control was the lack of public control over the Soviet political system from below.

== Leadership ==
The chairman of the Party Control Committee was a powerful figure in Party politics, and usually held membership in the Politburo. Notable chairmen included Andrei Andreyev, Nikolay Shvernik, Arvid Pelshe, Mikhail Solomentsev and Boris Pugo.

In 1920–1923, as head of the CCC, People's Commissar of Rabkrin (Stalin) was in charge of its activities on the national level.

Chairman of the Central Control Commission:

- Valerian Kuibyshev (1923–1926)
- Grigol Ordzhonikidze (1926–1930)
- Andrey Andreyev (1930–1931)
- Jānis Rudzutaks (1931–1934)

Chairman of the Party Control Commission of the Central Committee:

- Lazar Kaganovich (1934–1935)
- Nikolai Yezhov (1935–1939)
- Andrey Andreyev (1939–1952)

Chairman of the Party Control Committee of the Central Committee:

- Matvei Shkiryatov (1952–1954)
- Vacant (1954–1956)
- Nikolay Shvernik (1956–1966)
- Arvīds Pelše (1966–1983)
- Mikhail Solomentsev (1983–1988)
- Boris Pugo (1988–1990)

Chairman of the Central Control Commission:

- Boris Pugo (1990–1991)
- Yevgeny Makhov (1991)

== Central Control Commission composition ==
Congress	Date	CCC members	of whom voting	CCC presidium	of whom voting
10th Congress RKP(b)	March 1921	10	7	10	7
11th Congress RKP(b)	April 1922	7	5	7	5
12th Congress RKP(b)	April 1923	60	10	14	9
15th Congress RKP(b)	May 1924	150	—	21	15
14th Congress VKP(b)	December 1925	163	—	30	21
15th Congress VKP(b)	December 1927	195	—	32	22
16th Congress VKP(b)	July 1930	187	—	31	25

Source: E.A. Rees, State Control in Soviet Russia. London: Macmillan, 1987; p. 242.

== See also ==
- Central Auditing Commission – another control organ of the CPSU
- Central Party Control Commission of the Socialist Unity Party of Germany – control organ of the Socialist Unity Party of Germany, following the Soviet one.
