= Secretariat of the Communist Party of the Soviet Union =

Administration organ of the Communist Party of the Soviet Union

Secretariat of the Central Committee of the Communist Party of the Soviet Union Секретариат ЦК КПСС

Information
- General Secretary: Joseph Stalin (first; 1922–1953); Mikhail Gorbachev (last; 1985–1990)
- Elected by: Central Committee
- Responsible to: Central Committee
- Seats: Varied

Meeting place
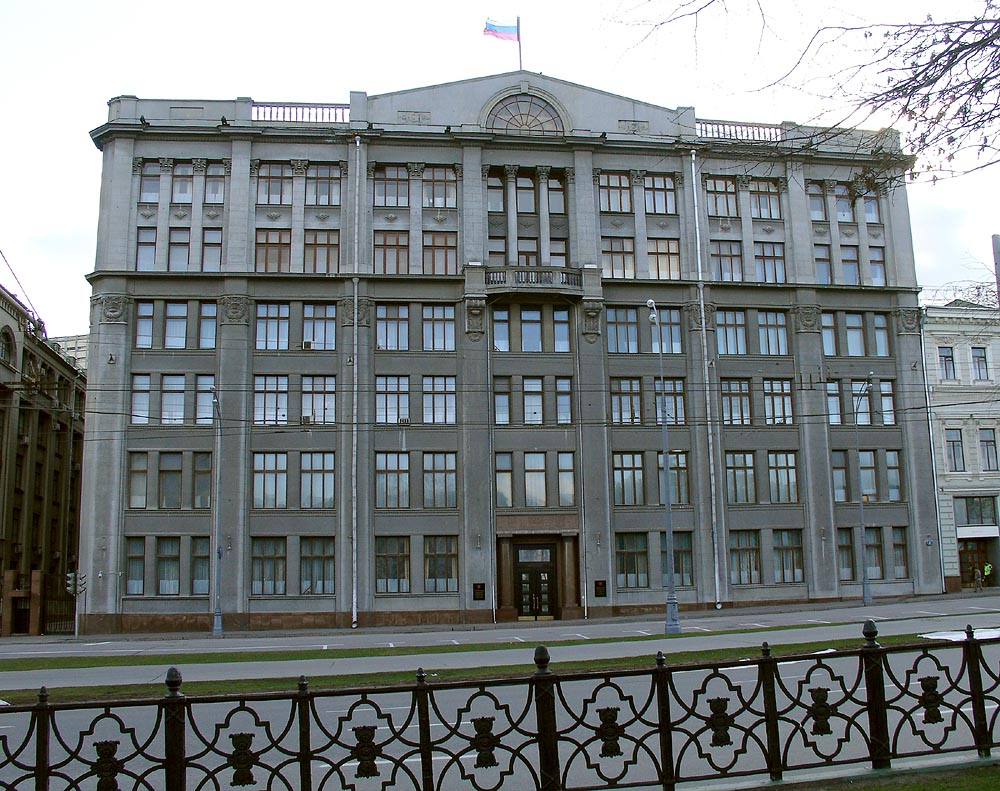
- Staraya Square, Moscow, Russian SFSR

The Secretariat of the Central Committee of the Communist Party of the Soviet Union (CPSU) was responsible for managing and directing the day-to-day operations of the Communist Party of the Soviet Union, while the Politburo was charged with the policy-making aspects of the party. The Secretariat was a component agency of the party's Central Committee.

== Overview ==
The members of the Secretariat were elected by the Communist Party's Central Committee, although in all but the first years of its existence the elections were a formality since decisions were made by the senior leadership before the voting. The General Secretary of the CPSU, who was also a Politburo member, was the leader of the Secretariat and of the Party. Dual membership in the Secretariat and the Politburo was in practice reserved for two or three very senior members of the Soviet leadership, and in the post-Stalin era (after March 1953) was a stepping-stone to ultimate power. The last five Soviet leaders (Nikita Khrushchev, Leonid Brezhnev, Yuri Andropov, Konstantin Chernenko and Mikhail Gorbachev) were all senior Secretaries before becoming First or General Secretaries. Additionally, Georgy Malenkov was briefly the leader of the Party for around a week after Stalin's death by virtue of being the top member of the Secretariat.

The Central Committee established the Secretariat on 6 August 1917; it initially comprised Felix Dzerzhinsky, Matvei Muranov and Yakov Sverdlov as full members and Adolph Joffe and Elena Stasova as candidate members (or alternates). Following the October Revolution of November 1917, Sverdlov and Stasova in effect handled the work of the Secretariat as the other members of the body assumed other duties. At the time, the Secretariat was responsible for technical issues such as coordination of the activities of regional Party organizations and handling routine administrative affairs of the Party. Its staff increased from just 30 in 1919 to 600 in 1921 and to 767 by 1925.

By 1922, the body had transformed from a technical committee to become one of the most important components of the Party, and from that point on it was responsible for day-to-day operations of the Communist Party. Also in 1922, the position of General Secretary was created, the General Secretary became the head of the Secretariat and, in the years following Lenin's death in 1924, became the most important figure in the Party and in the Soviet Union.

== See also ==
- Organization of the Communist Party of the Soviet Union
- Politburo of the Communist Party of the Soviet Union
