= Central Committee of the 24th Congress of the Communist Party of the Soviet Union =

The Central Committee of the 24th Congress of the Communist Party of the Soviet Union was in session from 1971 until 1976. It elected, at its 1st Plenary Session, the 24th Politburo, the 24th Secretariat and the 24th Party Control Committee of the Communist Party of the Soviet Union.

== Plenums ==
The Central Committee was not a permanent institution. It convened plenary sessions. 11 CC plenary sessions were held between the 24th Congress and the 25th Congress. When the CC was not in session, decision-making power was vested in the internal bodies of the CC itself; that is, the Politburo and the Secretariat. None of these bodies were permanent either; typically they convened several times a month.

Plenary sessions of the Central Committee
| Plenum | Date | Length |
|---|---|---|
| 1st Plenary Session | 9 April 1971 | 1 day |
| 2nd Plenary Session | 22–23 November 1971 | 2 days |
| 3rd Plenary Session | 19 May 1972 | 1 day |
| 4th Plenary Session | 18 December 1972 | 1 day |
| 5th Plenary Session | 26–27 April 1973 | 2 days |
| 6th Plenary Session | 10–11 December 1973 | 2 days |
| 7th Plenary Session | 24 July 1974 | 1 day |
| 8th Plenary Session | 14 December 1974 | 1 day |
| 9th Plenary Session | 16 April 1975 | 1 day |
| 10th Plenary Session | 1 December 1975 | 1 day |
| 11th Plenary Session | 20 February 1976 | 1 day |

== Composition ==
=== Members ===
Members of the Central Committee of the 24th Congress of the Communist Party of the Soviet Union
| Name | Cyrillic | 23rd CC | 25th CC | Birth | Death | PM | Ethnicity | Gender |
|---|---|---|---|---|---|---|---|---|
| Pyotr Abrasimov | Петр Абрасимов | Old | Reelected | 1912 | 2009 | 1940 | Russian | Male |
| Sergey Afanasyev | Серге́й Афана́сьев | Old | Reelected | 1918 | 2001 | 1943 | Russian | Male |
| Vasily Akulintsev | Василий Акулинцев | New | Reelected | 1916 | 1993 | 1944 | Russian | Male |
| Evgeny Alekseevsky | Евгений Алексеевский | Candidate | Reelected | 1906 | 1979 | 1925 | Ukrainian | Male |
| Anatoly Alexandrov | Анатолий Александров | Old | Reelected | 1903 | 1994 | 1962 | Ukrainian | Male |
| Heydar Aliyev | Гейда́р Али́ев | New | Reelected | 1923 | 2003 | 1945 | Azerbaijani | Male |
| Yuri Andropov | Юрий Андропов | Old | Reelected | 1914 | 1984 | 1939 | Russian | Male |
| Aleksey Antonov | Алексей Антонов | Candidate | Reelected | 1912 | 2010 | 1940 | Russian | Male |
| Boris Aristov | Борис Аристов | New | Reelected | 1925 | 2018 | 1945 | Russian | Male |
| Bayken Ashimov | Асанбай Аскаров | Old | Reelected | 1917 | 2010 | 1944 | Kazakh | Male |
| Asanbay Askarov | Байкен Ашимов | Old | Reelected | 1922 | 2001 | 1940 | Kazakh | Male |
| Stepan Avramenko | Степан Авраменко | Candidate | Reelected | 1918 | 2010 | 1950 | Ukrainian | Male |
| Ivan Bagramyan | Иван Баграмян | Old | Reelected | 1897 | 1982 | 1941 | Armenian | Male |
| Nikolai Baibakov | Николай Байбаков | Old | Reelected | 1911 | 2008 | 1939 | Russian | Male |
| Vyacheslav Bakhirev | Вячеслав Бахирев | New | Reelected | 1916 | 1991 | 1951 | Russian | Male |
| Nikolai Bannikov | Никола́й Ба́нников | Old | Reelected | 1914 | 2004 | 1937 | Russian | Male |
| Alexander Basov | Александр Басов | Old | Not | 1912 | 1988 | 1945 | Russian | Male |
| Pavel Batitsky | Па́вел Бати́цкий | Old | Reelected | 1910 | 1984 | 1938 | Ukrainian | Male |
| Boris Beshchev | Борис Бещев | Old | Reelected | 1903 | 1981 | 1927 | Russian | Male |
| Aleksandr Bleskov | Александр Блесков | New | Reelected | 1922 | 2006 | 1951 | Russian | Male |
| Ivan Bodiul | Иван Бодюл | Old | Reelected | 1918 | 2013 | 1940 | Ukrainian | Male |
| Ivan Bondarenko | Иван Бондаренко | New | Reelected | 1926 | 2009 | 1950 | Ukrainian | Male |
| Andrei Borodin | Андрей Бородин | Old | Reelected | 1912 | 1984 | 1941 | Russian | Male |
| Pavel Borodin | Павел Бородин | Old | Reelected | 1911 | 1998 | 1932 | Russian | Male |
| Boris Bratchenko | Бори́с Бра́тченко | Candidate | Reelected | 1912 | 2004 | 1940 | Russian | Male |
| Konstantin Brekhov | Константи́н Бре́хов | Candidate | Reelected | 1907 | 1994 | 1931 | Russian | Male |
| Leonid Brezhnev | Леонид Брежнев | Old | Reelected | 1906 | 1982 | 1931 | Russian | Male |
| Boris Bugayev | Борис Бугаев | New | Reelected | 1923 | 2007 | 1942 | Ukrainian | Male |
| Aleksandr Bulgakov | Александр Булгаков | Candidate | Reelected | 1907 | 1996 | 1937 | Ukrainian | Male |
| Boris Butoma | Бутома Евстафьевич | Candidate | Reelected | 1907 | 1976 | 1928 | Ukrainian | Male |
| Konstantin Chernenko | Константин Черненко | Candidate | Reelected | 1911 | 1985 | 1931 | Ukrainian | Male |
| Stepan Chervonenko | Степан Червоненко | Old | Reelected | 1915 | 2003 | 1940 | Ukrainian | Male |
| Gavrii Chiryayev | Гавриил Чиряев | Old | Reelected | 1925 | 1985 | 1944 | Yakut | Male |
| Aleksey Chornyy | Алексей Чёрный | New | Reelected | 1921 | 2002 | 1931 | Ukrainian | Male |
| Vasily Chuikov | Васи́лий Чуйко́в | Old | Reelected | 1900 | 1982 | 1919 | Russian | Male |
| Vladimir Degtyarov | Владимир Дегтярёв | Old | Not | 1920 | 1993 | 1945 | Russian | Male |
| Pyotr Dementev | Pyotr Dementev | Old | Reelected | 1907 | 1977 | 1938 | Russian | Male |
| Pyotr Demichev | Пётр Де́мичев | Old | Reelected | 1917 | 2010 | 1939 | Russian | Male |
| Viktor Dobrik | Виктор До́брик | Candidate | Reelected | 1927 | 2008 | 1954 | Ukrainian | Male |
| Anatoly Dobrynin | Анато́лий Добры́нин | Candidate | Reelected | 1919 | 2010 | 1945 | Russian | Male |
| Vladimir Dolgikh | Владимир Долгих | New | Reelected | 1924 | 2020 | 1942 | Russian | Male |
| Vasily Drozdenko | Васи́лий Дрозде́нко | Candidate | Reelected | 1924 | 1982 | 1944 | Ukrainian | Male |
| Anatoly Drygin | Анатолий Дрыгин | Candidate | Reelected | 1914 | 1990 | 1940 | Russian | Male |
| Veniamin Dymshits | Вениамин Дымшиц | Old | Reelected | 1910 | 1993 | 1937 | Ukrainian | Male |
| Pyotr Fedoseyev | Петр Федосеев | Old | Reelected | 1908 | 1990 | 1939 | Russian | Male |
| Andrey Filatov | Андрей Филатов | Old | Died | 1912 | 1973 | 1950 | Russian | Male |
| Leonid Florentyev | Леонид Флорентьев | Old | Reelected | 1911 | 2003 | 1939 | Russian | Male |
| Yekaterina Furtseva | Екатерина Фурцева | Old | Died | 1910 | 1974 | 1930 | Russian | Female |
| Konstantin Galanshin | Константин Галаншин | Old | Reelected | 1912 | 2011 | 1944 | Russian | Male |
| Muhammetnazar Gapurov | Мухамедназар Гапуров | Candidate | Reelected | 1912 | 2004 | 1944 | Turkmen | Male |
| Vasily Garbuzov | Василий Гарбузов | Old | Reelected | 1911 | 1985 | 1939 | Russian | Male |
| Alexander Georgiev | Александр Георгиев | Old | Reelected | 1913 | 1976 | 1943 | Ukrainian | Male |
| Nikolai Goldin | Николай Голдин | New | Reelected | 1910 | 2001 | 1929 | Russian | Male |
| Grigory Gorban | Григорий Горбань | New | Reelected | 1932 | 2000 | 1959 | Ukrainian | Male |
| Mikhail Gorbachev | Михаил Горбачёв | New | Reelected | 1931 | 2022 | 1952 | Russian | Male |
| Sergey Gorshkov | Серге́й Горшков | Old | Reelected | 1910 | 1988 | 1942 | Russian | Male |
| Fodor Goryachev | Фёдор Горячев | Old | Reelected | 1905 | 1996 | 1927 | Russian | Male |
| Andrei Grechko | Андре́й Гре́чко | Old | Reelected | 1903 | 1976 | 1928 | Ukrainian | Male |
| Leonid Grekov | Леонид Греков | New | Reelected | 1928 | 2004 | 1949 | Russian | Male |
| Konstantin Grishin | Константин Гришин | Old | Died | 1908 | 1973 | 1931 | Russian | Male |
| Viktor Grishin | Ви́ктор Гри́шин | Old | Reelected | 1914 | 1992 | 1939 | Russian | Male |
| Ivan Grishmanov | Иван Гришманов | Old | Reelected | 1906 | 1979 | 1936 | Russian | Male |
| Andrei Gromyko | Андрей Громыко | Old | Reelected | 1909 | 1989 | 1931 | Belarusian | Male |
| Pyotr Grushin | Пётр Гру́шин | Old | Reelected | 1906 | 1993 | 1931 | Russian | Male |
| Ivan Hrushetsky | Иван Грушецкий | Old | Reelected | 1904 | 1982 | 1928 | Ukrainian | Male |
| Maria Ivannikova | Раиса Бельских | New | Reelected | 1923 | 2006 | 1948 | Russian | Female |
| Yevgeny Ivanovsky | Евге́ний Ивано́вский | New | Reelected | 1918 | 1991 | 1941 | Belarusian | Male |
| Givi Javakhishvili | Гиви Джавахишвили | Old | Not | 1912 | 1985 | 1941 | Georgian | Male |
| Johannes Käbin | Йоха́ннес Кэ́бин | Old | Reelected | 1905 | 1999 | 1927 | Estonian | Male |
| Valery Kalmykov | Валерий Калмыков | Old | Died | 1908 | 1974 | 1942 | Russian | Male |
| Ivan Kapitonov | Иван Капитонов | Old | Reelected | 1915 | 2002 | 1939 | Russian | Male |
| Konstantin Katushev | Константин Катушев | Old | Reelected | 1927 | 2010 | 1952 | Russian | Male |
| Vasily Kavun | Василий Кавун | Old | Reelected | 1928 | 2009 | 1954 | Ukrainian | Male |
| Vasily Kazakov | Евге́ний Ивано́вский | New | Reelected | 1927 | 2008 | 1947 | Russian | Male |
| Ivan Kazanets | Иван Казанец | Old | Reelected | 1918 | 2013 | 1944 | Ukrainian | Male |
| Mstislav Keldysh | Мстислав Келдыш | Old | Reelected | 1911 | 1978 | 1949 | Russian | Male |
| Stepan Khitrov | Степан Хитров | New | Reelected | 1910 | 1999 | 1932 | Russian | Male |
| Aleksandr Khramtsov | Александр Храмцов | New | Reelected | 1921 | 2004 | 1962 | Russian | Male |
| Narmakhonmadi Khudayberdyyev | Нармахонмади Худайбердыев | Comeback | Reelected | 1928 | 2011 | 1962 | Uzbek | Male |
| Andrei Kirilenko | Андре́й Кириле́нко | Old | Reelected | 1906 | 1990 | 1930 | Ukrainian | Male |
| Vladimir Kirillin | Владимир Кириллин | Old | Reelected | 1913 | 1999 | 1937 | Russian | Male |
| Ivan Kiselov | Иван Киселёв | Old | Reelected | 1917 | 2004 | 1944 | Russian | Male |
| Tikhon Kiselyov | Ти́хон Киселёв | Old | Reelected | 1917 | 1983 | 1940 | Belarusian | Male |
| Mikhail Klepikov | Михаил Клепиков | Candidate | Reelected | 1927 | 1999 | 1956 | Russian | Male |
| Anton Kochinyan | Анто́н Кочиня́н | Old | Removed | 1913 | 1989 | 1931 | Armenian | Male |
| Aleksandr Kokarev | Александр Кокарев | Old | Reelected | 1909 | 1991 | 1938 | Ukrainian | Male |
| Ivan Konev | Иван Конев | Old | Died | 1897 | 1973 | 1918 | Russian | Male |
| Vasily Konotop | Василий Конотоп | Old | Reelected | 1916 | 1995 | 1944 | Ukrainian | Male |
| Nikolay Konovalov | Никола́й Конова́лов | Old | Reelected | 1907 | 1993 | 1929 | Russian | Male |
| Oleksandr Korniychuk | Александр Корнейчук | Old | Died | 1905 | 1972 | 1940 | Ukrainian | Male |
| Boris Korotkov | Борис Коротков | New | Not | 1927 | 1995 | 1952 | Russian | Male |
| Nikolay Korytkov | Николай Корытков | Old | Reelected | 1910 | 2000 | 1939 | Russian | Male |
| Shapet Kospanov | Шапет Коспанов | Old | Not | 1914 | 2006 | 1944 | Kazakh | Male |
| Leonid Kostandov | Леони́д Коста́ндов | Candidate | Reelected | 1915 | 1984 | 1942 | Armenian | Male |
| Anatoly Kostousov | Анатолий Костоусов | Old | Reelected | 1906 | 1985 | 1925 | Russian | Male |
| Alexei Kosygin | Алексей Косыгин | Old | Reelected | 1904 | 1980 | 1927 | Russian | Male |
| Alexander Kovalenko | Александр Коваленко | Old | Reelected | 1909 | 1987 | 1931 | Ukrainian | Male |
| Yevgeny Kozhevnikov | Евгений Кожевников | Old | Not | 1905 | 1979 | 1942 | Russian | Male |
| Nikolay Kozlov | Николай Козлов | Candidate | Reelected | 1925 | 2001 | 1946 | Russian | Male |
| Pavel Kozyr | Па́вел Ко́зырь | Candidate | Reelected | 1913 | 1999 | 1939 | Ukrainian | Male |
| Mikhail Krakhmalov | Михаил Крахмалёв | Old | Reelected | 1914 | 1977 | 1939 | Russian | Male |
| Nikolay Krylov | Никола́й Крыло́в | Old | Died | 1903 | 1972 | 1927 | Russian | Male |
| Fyodor Kulakov | Фёдор Кулаков | Old | Reelected | 1918 | 1978 | 1940 | Russian | Male |
| Leonid Kulichenko | Леонид Куличенко | Old | Reelected | 1913 | 1990 | 1940 | Russian | Male |
| Viktor Kulikov | Виктор Куликов | New | Reelected | 1921 | 2013 | 1942 | Russian | Male |
| Dinmukhamed Kunaev | Дінмұхаммед Қонаев | Old | Reelected | 1912 | 1993 | 1939 | Kazakh | Male |
| Pavel Kutakhov | Павел Кутахов | New | Reelected | 1914 | 1984 | 1942 | Russian | Male |
| Vasily Kutsevol | Васи́лий Куцево́л | Candidate | Not | 1920 | 2001 | 1947 | Ukrainian | Male |
| Vasily Kuznetsov | Василий Кузнецов | Old | Reelected | 1901 | 1990 | 1927 | Russian | Male |
| Sergey Lapin | Серге́й Лапин | New | Reelected | 1912 | 1990 | 1939 | Russian | Male |
| Yevgeny Lebedev | Евгений Лебедев | New | Died | 1923 | 1974 | 1958 | Russian | Male |
| Pavel Leonov | Павел Леонов | Candidate | Reelected | 1918 | 1992 | 1944 | Russian | Male |
| Mikhail Lesechko | Михаил Лесечко | Old | Reelected | 1909 | 1984 | 1940 | Ukrainian | Male |
| Oleksandr Liashko | Алекса́ндр Ляшко́ | Old | Reelected | 1915 | 2002 | 1942 | Ukrainian | Male |
| Viktor Lomakin | Виктор Ломакин | New | Reelected | 1926 | 2012 | 1953 | Russian | Male |
| Pyotr Lomako | Пётр Лома́ко | Old | Reelected | 1904 | 1990 | 1925 | Russian | Male |
| Vladimir Lomonosov | Владимир Ломоносов | Old | Reelected | 1928 | 1999 | 1950 | Russian | Male |
| Ivan Lutak | Иван Лутак | Old | Not | 1919 | 2009 | 1940 | Ukrainian | Male |
| Nikolay Lyashchenko | Николай Лященко | Candidate | Reelected | 1910 | 2000 | 1931 | Russian | Male |
| Sergey Manyakin | Сергей Манякин | Old | Reelected | 1923 | 2010 | 1945 | Russian | Male |
| Valery Marisov | Вале́рий Ма́рисов | Candidate | Reelected | 1915 | 1992 | 1940 | Russian | Male |
| Georgy Markov | Гео́ргий Ма́рков | New | Reelected | 1911 | 1991 | 1946 | Russian | Male |
| Sergey Maryakhin | Сергей Маряхин | Candidate | Died | 1911 | 1972 | 1931 | Russian | Male |
| Pyotr Masherov | Пётр Машеров | Old | Reelected | 1918 | 1980 | 1943 | Belarusian | Male |
| Nikolay Maslennikov | Николай Масленников | New | Reelected | 1921 | 2013 | 1951 | Russian | Male |
| Nazar Matchanov | Назар Матчанов | New | Reelected | 1923 | 2010 | 1949 | Uzbek | Male |
| Vladimir Matskevich | Владимир Мацкевич | Old | Reelected | 1909 | 1998 | 1939 | Ukrainian | Male |
| Kirill Mazurov | Кири́лл Ма́зуров | Old | Reelected | 1914 | 1989 | 1940 | Belarusian | Male |
| Valentin Mesyats | Валентин Месяц | New | Reelected | 1928 | 2019 | 1955 | Russian | Male |
| German Mikhaylov | Герман Михайлов | New | Reelected | 1929 | 1999 | 1964 | Ukrainian | Male |
| Anastas Mikoyan | Анастас Микоян | Old | Not | 1895 | 1978 | 1915 | Armenian | Male |
| Andrey Modogoyev | Андрей Модогоев | Candidate | Reelected | 1915 | 1989 | 1940 | Buryat | Male |
| Kirill Moskalenko | Кирилл Москаленко | Old | Reelected | 1902 | 1985 | 1926 | Ukrainian | Male |
| Vasil Mzhavanadze | Василий Мжаванадзе | Old | Removed | 1902 | 1988 | 1927 | Georgian | Male |
| Yadgar Nasriddinova | Ядгар Насриддинова | Old | Removed | 1920 | 2006 | 1942 | Uzbek | Female |
| Pyotr Neporozhny | Пётр Непорожний | Candidate | Reelected | 1910 | 1999 | 1940 | Ukrainian | Male |
| Sabir Niyazbekov | Сабир Ниязбеков | Candidate | Reelected | 1912 | 1989 | 1939 | Kazakh | Male |
| Ignaty Novikov | Игнатий Новиков | Old | Reelected | 1906 | 1993 | 1926 | Ukrainian | Male |
| Vladimir Novikov | Владимир Новиков | Old | Reelected | 1907 | 2000 | 1936 | Russian | Male |
| Ziya Nuriyev | Зия Нуриев | Old | Reelected | 1915 | 2012 | 1939 | Bashkir | Male |
| Nikolai Orgakov | Николай Огарков | Old | Reelected | 1917 | 1994 | 1945 | Russian | Male |
| Vladimir Orlov | Владимир Орлов | New | Reelected | 1921 | 1999 | 1948 | Russian | Male |
| Nikolai Patolichev | Николай Патоличев | Old | Reelected | 1908 | 1989 | 1928 | Russian | Male |
| Borys Paton | Бори́с Пато́н | Old | Reelected | 1918 | 2020 | 1952 | Ukrainian | Male |
| Georgy Pavlov | Гео́ргий Па́влов | Candidate | Reelected | 1910 | 1991 | 1939 | Russian | Male |
| Vladimir Pavlov | Влади́мир Па́влов | Old | Reelected | 1923 | 1998 | 1948 | Russian | Male |
| Ivan Pavlovsky | Ива́н Павло́вский | New | Reelected | 1909 | 1999 | 1939 | Ukrainian | Male |
| Nikolai Pegov | Георгий Павлов | Old | Reelected | 1905 | 1991 | 1939 | Ukrainian | Male |
| Arvīds Pelše | А́рвид Пе́льше | Old | Reelected | 1899 | 1983 | 1915 | Latvian | Male |
| Stanislav Pilotovich | Станислав Пилотович | New | Reelected | 1922 | 1986 | 1944 | Belarusian | Male |
| Nikolai Podgorny | Никола́й Подго́рный | Old | Reelected | 1903 | 1983 | 1930 | Ukrainian | Male |
| Ivan Polyakov | Ива́н Поляко́в | Old | Reelected | 1914 | 2004 | 1949 | Belarusian | Male |
| Dmitry Polyansky | Дми́трий Поля́нский | Old | Reelected | 1917 | 2001 | 1939 | Ukrainian | Male |
| Boris Ponomarev | Борис Пономарёв | Old | Reelected | 1905 | 1995 | 1919 | Russian | Male |
| Maria Popova | Мари́я Попо́ва | Old | Reelected | 1928 | 2021 | 1959 | Russian | Female |
| Nina Popova | Нина Попова | Old | Not | 1908 | 1994 | 1932 | Russian | Female |
| Nikolay Priyezzhev | Николай Приезжев | Old | Reelected | 1919 | 1989 | 1946 | Russian | Male |
| Sergey Pritytsky | Серге́й Притыцкий | Old | Died | 1913 | 1971 | 1932 | Belarusian | Male |
| Mikhail Prokofyev | Михаил Прокофьев | New | Reelected | 1910 | 1999 | 1941 | Russian | Male |
| Vladimir Promyslov | Владимир Промыслов | Old | Reelected | 1908 | 1993 | 1928 | Russian | Male |
| Vasily Prokhorov | Ильич Василий | New | Reelected | 1906 | 1989 | 1928 | Russian | Male |
| Alexander Puzanov | Александр Пузанов | Old | Not | 1906 | 1998 | 1925 | Russian | Male |
| Sharof Rashidov | Шараф Рашидов | Old | Reelected | 1917 | 1983 | 1939 | Uzbek | Male |
| Dzhabar Rasulov | Джабар Расулов | Old | Reelected | 1913 | 1982 | 1934 | Tajik | Male |
| Nikolai Rodionov | Никола́й Родио́нов | Old | Reelected | 1915 | 1999 | 1944 | Russian | Male |
| Grigory Romanov | Григорий Романов | Old | Reelected | 1923 | 2008 | 1944 | Russian | Male |
| Roman Rudenko | Рома́н Руде́нко | Old | Reelected | 1907 | 1981 | 1926 | Russian | Male |
| Konstantin Rudnev | Константин Руднев | Old | Reelected | 1911 | 1980 | 1941 | Russian | Male |
| Aleksey Rumyantsev | Алексей Румянцев | Old | Reelected | 1905 | 1993 | 1940 | Russian | Male |
| Konstantin Rusakov | Константи́н Русако́в | New | Reelected | 1909 | 1993 | 1943 | Russian | Male |
| Vasily Rykov | Василий Рыков | Candidate | Reelected | 1918 | 2011 | 1943 | Russian | Male |
| Vasily Ryabikov | Васи́лий Ря́биков | Old | Died | 1907 | 1974 | 1925 | Russian | Male |
| Yakov Ryabov | Я́ков Ря́бов | New | Reelected | 1928 | 2018 | 1954 | Russian | Male |
| Ivan Senkin | Иван Сенькин | Candidate | Reelected | 1915 | 1986 | 1940 | Karelian | Male |
| Ivan Shavrov | Иван Шавров | New | Not | 1916 | 1992 | 1940 | Belarusian | Male |
| Midkhat Shakirov | Мидха́т Шаки́ров | New | Not | 1916 | 2004 | 1944 | Bashkir | Male |
| Nikolai Shchelokov | Никола́й Щёлоков | Old | Reelected | 1910 | 1984 | 1931 | Russian | Male |
| Volodymyr Shcherbytsky | Влади́мир Щерби́цкий | Old | Reelected | 1918 | 1990 | 1948 | Ukrainian | Male |
| Semon Shchetinin | Семён Щетинин | Old | Died | 1910 | 1975 | 1932 | Russian | Male |
| Alexander Shelepin | Алекса́ндр Шеле́пин | Old | Removed | 1918 | 1994 | 1940 | Russian | Male |
| Petro Shelest | Петро Шелест | Old | Removed | 1908 | 1996 | 1928 | Ukrainian | Male |
| Aleksandr Sheremetov | Александр Шереметов | Old | Not | 1925 | 2006 | 1952 | Russian | Male |
| Vladimir Shevchenko | Владимир Шевченко | Old | Not | 1918 | 1997 | 1940 | Ukrainian | Male |
| Aleksey Shibayev | Алексей Шибаев | Old | Reelected | 1915 | 1991 | 1940 | Russian | Male |
| Aleksey Shitikov | Алексе́й Ши́тиков | Old | Reelected | 1912 | 1993 | 1939 | Russian | Male |
| Aleksey Shkolnikov | Алексей Шко́льников | Old | Reelected | 1914 | 2003 | 1940 | Russian | Male |
| Aleksandr Shokin | Алекса́ндр Шо́кин | Candidate | Reelected | 1909 | 1988 | 1936 | Russian | Male |
| Mikhail Sholokhov | Михаил Шолохов | Old | Reelected | 1905 | 1984 | 1932 | Russian | Male |
| Semon Skachkov | Семён Скачков | Candidate | Reelected | 1907 | 1996 | 1936 | Ukrainian | Male |
| Anatoly Skochilov | Анатолий Скочилов | Old | Reelected | 1912 | 1977 | 1940 | Russian | Male |
| Yefim Slavsky | Ефи́м Сла́вский | Old | Reelected | 1898 | 1991 | 1918 | Russian | Male |
| Leonid Smirnov | Леонид Смирнов | Old | Reelected | 1916 | 2001 | 1943 | Russian | Male |
| Vasily Smirnov | Василий Смирно́в | Candidate | Not | 1905 | 1979 | 1925 | Russian | Male |
| Antanas Sniečkus | Антанас Снечкус | Old | Died | 1903 | 1974 | 1920 | Lithuanian | Male |
| Sergey Sokolov | Серге́й Соколо́в | Old | Reelected | 1911 | 2012 | 1937 | Russian | Male |
| Tikhon Sokovlev | Ти́хон Соколо́в | Old | Reelected | 1913 | 1992 | 1941 | Russian | Male |
| Mikhail Solomentsev | Михаи́л Соло́менцев | Old | Reelected | 1913 | 2008 | 1940 | Russian | Male |
| Vladimir Stepakov | Влади́мир Степако́в | New | Reelected | 1912 | 1987 | 1937 | Russian | Male |
| Alexander Struyev | Алекса́ндр Стру́ев | Old | Reelected | 1906 | 1991 | 1927 | Ukrainian | Male |
| Fodor Surganov | Фёдор Сурганов | Old | Reelected | 1911 | 1976 | 1940 | Belarusian | Male |
| Mikhail Suslov | Михаил Суслов | Old | Reelected | 1902 | 1982 | 1921 | Russian | Male |
| Fikryat Tabeyev | Фикрят Табеев | Old | Reelected | 1928 | 2015 | 1957 | Russian | Male |
| Valentina Tereshkova | Валентина Терешкова | New | Reelected | 1937 | Alive | 1960 | Russian | Female |
| Nikolai Tikhonov | Николай Тихонов | Old | Reelected | 1905 | 1997 | 1940 | Russian | Male |
| Aleksey Titarenko | Алексе́й Титаре́нко | Candidate | Reelected | 1915 | 1992 | 1940 | Ukrainian | Male |
| Vitaly Titov | Виталий Титов | Old | Reelected | 1907 | 1980 | 1938 | Ukrainian | Male |
| Salchak Toka | Салчак Тока | Candidate | Died | 1901 | 1973 | 1944 | Tuvan | Male |
| Alexander Tokarev | Алекса́ндр То́карев | Old | Reelected | 1921 | 2004 | 1942 | Russian | Male |
| Vasily Tolstikov | Василий Толстиков | Old | Reelected | 1917 | 2003 | 1948 | Russian | Male |
| Nikita Tolubeyev | Ники́та Толубе́ев | New | Reelected | 1922 | 2013 | 1947 | Ukrainian | Male |
| Sergey Trapeznikov | Сергей Трапезников | Old | Reelected | 1912 | 1984 | 1931 | Russian | Male |
| Georgy Tsukanov | Георгий Цуканов | New | Reelected | 1919 | 2001 | 1941 | Ukrainian | Male |
| Vladimir Tsybulko | Владимир Цыбулько | New | Reelected | 1924 | 1987 | 1944 | Ukrainian | Male |
| Yevgeny Tyazhelnikov | Евге́ний Тяже́льников | New | Reelected | 1928 | 2020 | 1951 | Russian | Male |
| Magomed-Salam Umakhanov | Магомед-Салам Умаханов | New | Reelected | 1918 | 1992 | 1939 | Dargin | Male |
| Dmitriy Ustinov | Дми́трий Усти́нов | Old | Reelected | 1908 | 1984 | 1927 | Russian | Male |
| Turdakun Usubaliev | Турдакун Усубалиев | Old | Reelected | 1919 | 2015 | 1945 | Kyrghyz | Male |
| Artur Vader | Бутома Евстафьевич | Candidate | Reelected | 1920 | 1978 | 1943 | Estonian | Male |
| Nikolai Vasilyev | Павел Бородин | Old | Reelected | 1916 | 2011 | 1942 | Russian | Male |
| Oleksiy Vatchenko | Алексе́й Ва́тченко | Old | Reelected | 1914 | 1984 | 1940 | Ukrainian | Male |
| Grigory Vashchenko | Григорий Ващенко | New | Reelected | 1920 | 1990 | 1943 | Ukrainian | Male |
| Aleksey Viktorov | Алексей Викторов | New | Reelected | 1917 | 1989 | 1945 | Russian | Male |
| Gennady Voronov | Геннадий Воронов | Old | Removed | 1910 | 1994 | 1931 | Russian | Male |
| Mikhail Voropayev | Михаил Воропаев | New | Reelected | 1919 | 2009 | 1945 | Russian | Male |
| Vitaly Vorotnikov | Вита́лий Воротнико́в | New | Reelected | 1926 | 2012 | 1950 | Russian | Male |
| Augusts Voss | Август Восс | New | Reelected | 1916 | 1994 | 1940 | Latvian | Male |
| Ivan Yakubovsky | Ива́н Якубо́вский | Old | Reelected | 1912 | 1976 | 1937 | Belarusian | Male |
| Mikhail Yasnov | Михаил Яснов | Old | Reelected | 1906 | 1991 | 1925 | Russian | Male |
| Mikhail Yefremov | Михаил Ефремов | Old | Not | 1911 | 2000 | 1931 | Russian | Male |
| Vyacheslav Yelyutin | Вячеслав Елю́тин | Old | Reelected | 1907 | 1993 | 1929 | Russian | Male |
| Alexei Yepishev | Алексей Епишев | Old | Reelected | 1908 | 1985 | 1929 | Russian | Male |
| Afanasy Yeshtokin | Афана́сий Ешто́кин | Old | Died | 1913 | 1974 | 1943 | Russian | Male |
| Lev Yermin | Ле́в Е́рмин | Candidate | Reelected | 1923 | 2004 | 1943 | Russian | Male |
| Aleksandr Yezhevsky | Александр Ежевский | Candidate | Reelected | 1915 | 2017 | 1945 | Russian | Male |
| Ivan Yunak | Иван Юнак | Old | Reelected | 1918 | 1995 | 1944 | Ukrainian | Male |
| Matvei Zakharov | Матве́й Заха́ров | Old | Died | 1898 | 1972 | 1917 | Russian | Male |
| Mikhail Zakharov | Михаил Захаров | Candidate | Not | 1918 | 2001 | 1943 | Russian | Male |
| Vladimir Zhigalin | Владимир Жигалин | Old | Reelected | 1907 | 1990 | 1931 | Russian | Male |
| Mikhail Zimyanin | Михаил Зимянин | Old | Reelected | 1914 | 1995 | 1939 | Belarusian | Male |
| Grigory Zolotukhin | Григо́рий Золоту́хин | Old | Reelected | 1911 | 1988 | 1939 | Russian | Male |
| Sergey Zverev | Серге́й Зве́рев | Old | Reelected | 1912 | 1978 | 1932 | Russian | Male |

=== Candidates ===
Candidate Members of the Central Committee of the 24th Congress of the Communist Party of the Soviet Union
| Name | Cyrillic | 23rd CC | 25th CC | Birth | Death | PM | Ethnicity | Gender |
|---|---|---|---|---|---|---|---|---|
| Pyotr Alekseyev | Пётр Алексеев | New | Member | 1913 | 1999 | 1940 | Russian | Male |
| Semon Apryatkin | Семён Апряткин | New | Not | 1911 | 1977 | 1948 | Russian | Male |
| Erkin Auelbekov | Еркин Ауельбеков | New | Member | 1930 | 1999 | 1940 | Kazakh | Male |
| Vladimir Bazovsky | Владимир Базовский | Candidate | Member | 1917 | 1993 | 1942 | Russian | Male |
| Khasan Bekturganov | Хасан Бектурганов | New | Member | 1922 | 1987 | 1942 | Kazakh | Male |
| Nikolai Belukha | Николай Белуха | New | Candidate | 1920 | 1981 | 1948 | Ukrainian | Male |
| Ivan Bespalov | Иван Беспалов | New | Member | 1911 | 2011 | 1944 | Russian | Male |
| Aleksandra Biryukova | Александра Бирюкова | New | Member | 1929 | 2008 | 1956 | Russian | Female |
| Leonid Borodin | Леонид Бородин | New | Candidate | 1923 | 2008 | 1948 | Russian | Male |
| Mykola Borysenko | Николай Борисенко | New | Member | 1911 | 1977 | 1943 | Ukrainian | Male |
| Oleksandr Botvin | Александр Ботвин | New | Member | 1918 | 1998 | 1943 | Ukrainian | Male |
| Semyon Budyonny | Семён Будённый | Candidate | Died | 1883 | 1973 | 1919 | Russian | Male |
| Aleksandr Chakovsky | Александр Чаковский | New | Candidate | 1913 | 1994 | 1941 | Russian | Male |
| Viktor Chebrikov | Виктор Че́бриков | New | Candidate | 1923 | 1999 | 1950 | Ukrainian | Male |
| Vasily Chorny | Василий Чёрный | New | Member | 1913 | 1996 | 1939 | Russian | Male |
| Albert Churkin | Альберт Чуркин | New | Not | 1923 | 2000 | 1949 | Russian | Male |
| Nikolay Davydov | Николай Давыдов | New | Not | 1930 | 1977 | 1958 | Russian | Male |
| Vladimir Demchenko | Иван Густов | Candidate | Candidate | 1920 | 1991 | 1946 | Russian | Male |
| Raisa Dementyeva | Раиса Дементьева | Candidate | Member | 1925 | 2022 | 1948 | Russian | Female |
| Vasily Demidenko | Василий Демиденко | Candidate | Candidate | 1930 | 1998 | 1955 | Ukrainian | Male |
| Vasiliy Doyenin | Василий Доенин | Candidate | Member | 1909 | 1977 | 1940 | Russian | Male |
| Viktor Fedorov | Ви́ктор Фёдоров | Candidate | Member | 1912 | 1990 | 1939 | Russian | Male |
| Aleksandr Filatov | Александр Филатов | New | Candidate | 1922 | 2016 | 1947 | Russian | Male |
| Alexandra Fominykh | Александра Фоминых | New | Candidate | 1925 | 2004 | 1961 | Russian | Female |
| Gennady Fomin | Геннадий Фомин | New | Candidate | 1936 | Alive | 1963 | Russian | Male |
| Vasily Frolov | Василий Фролов | Candidate | Candidate | 1914 | 1994 | 1944 | Russian | Male |
| Igor Furs | Игорь Фурс | Candidate | Candidate | 1929 | Alive | 1956 | Ukrainian | Male |
| Mikhail Georgadze | Михаил Георгадзе | Candidate | Candidate | 1912 | 1982 | 1942 | Georgian | Male |
| Konstantin Gerasimov | Константин Гера́симов | Candidate | Not | 1910 | 1982 | 1939 | Russian | Male |
| Andrei Getman | Андрей Гетман | Candidate | Not | 1903 | 1987 | 1927 | Ukrainian | Male |
| Valentin Goncharov | Валентин Гончаров | New | Not | 1937 | Alive | 1962 | Belarusian | Male |
| Pyotr Gorchakov | Пётр Горчаков | New | Candidate | 1917 | 2002 | 1939 | Russian | Male |
| Basan Gorodovikov | Баса́н Городовико́в | Candidate | Candidate | 1910 | 1983 | 1939 | Buzavan | Male |
| Nikolai Gribachev | Николай Грибачёв | Candidate | Candidate | 1910 | 1992 | 1943 | Russian | Male |
| Konstantin Grushevoy | Константин Грушевой | Candidate | Candidate | 1906 | 1982 | 1927 | Ukrainian | Male |
| Aleksandr Gudkov | Александр Гудков | New | Member | 1930 | 1992 | 1958 | Russian | Male |
| Ivan Gustov | Иван Густов | Candidate | Candidate | 1911 | 1996 | 1932 | Russian | Male |
| Timofey Guzhenko | Тимофей Гуженко | New | Member | 1918 | 2008 | 1941 | Russian | Male |
| Ali Ibragimov | Али Ибрагимов | New | Candidate | 1913 | 1985 | 1943 | Azerbaijani | Male |
| Kirill Ilyashenko | Кирилл Ильяшенко | New | Candidate | 1915 | 1980 | 1945 | Moldovan | Male |
| Nikolay Inozemtsev | Никола́й Инозе́мцев | New | Candidate | 1921 | 1982 | 1943 | Russian | Male |
| Mikhail Iovchuk | Михаил Иовчук | New | Candidate | 1908 | 1990 | 1926 | Belarusian | Male |
| Vasily Isayev | Василий Исаев | Candidate | Candidate | 1917 | 2008 | 1939 | Russian | Male |
| Aleksandr Ishkov | Александр Ишков | Candidate | Candidate | 1905 | 1988 | 1927 | Russian | Male |
| Bilar Kabaloyev | Семён Ислюков | Candidate | Candidate | 1915 | 1998 | 1939 | Chuvash | Male |
| Yakov Kabkov | Яков Кабков | New | Candidate | 1908 | 2001 | 1930 | Russian | Male |
| Abdulakhad Kakharov | Абдулахад Кахаров | Candidate | Not | 1913 | 1984 | 1939 | Tajik | Male |
| Nikifor Kalchenko | Никифор Ка́льченко | Candidate | Not | 1906 | 1989 | 1932 | Ukrainian | Male |
| Kallibek Kamalov | Каллибе́к Кама́лов | New | Candidate | 1926 | Alive | 1946 | Karakalpak | Male |
| Andrey Kandrenkov | Андре́й Кандрёнков | Candidate | Member | 1915 | 1989 | 1939 | Russian | Male |
| Georgy Karavayev | Георгий Караваев | New | Member | 1913 | 1994 | 1940 | Russian | Male |
| Vladimir Karlov | Влади́мир Ка́рлов | Candidate | Candidate | 1914 | 1994 | 1940 | Russian | Male |
| Yevdokya Karpova | Марина Журавлёва | Candidate | Member | 1923 | 2000 | 1952 | Russian | Female |
| Nikolai Kirichenko | Николай Кириченко | Candidate | Candidate | 1923 | 1986 | 1944 | Ukrainian | Male |
| Makhmadullo Kholov | Махмадулло Холов | New | Candidate | 1920 | 1989 | 1947 | Tajik | Male |
| Valter Klauson | Вальтер Клаусон | Candidate | Candidate | 1913 | 1988 | 1943 | Estonian | Male |
| Ivan Klimenko | Иван Клименко | New | Member | 1921 | 2006 | 1945 | Russian | Male |
| Aleksandr Klimov | Александр Климов | Candidate | Candidate | 1914 | 1979 | 1939 | Russian | Male |
| Filipp Knyazev | Фили́пп Кня́зев | New | Member | 1916 | 1994 | 1940 | Russian | Male |
| Vyacheslav Kochemasov | Вячеслав Кочемасов | Candidate | Candidate | 1918 | 1998 | 1944 | Russian | Male |
| Nikolay Kochetkov | Николай Кочетков | Candidate | Candidate | 1927 | 2002 | 1957 | Russian | Male |
| Olga Kolchina | Ольга Колчина | Candidate | Candidate | 1918 | 2017 | 1946 | Russian | Female |
| Alexander Koldunov | Сергей Козлов | New | Not | 1923 | 1992 | 1944 | Russian | Male |
| Aleksandr Kolesnikov | Александр Колесников | New | Candidate | 1930 | 2008 | 1966 | Ukrainian | Male |
| Aleksey Kortunov | Алексе́й Кортуно́в | Candidate | Died | 1907 | 1973 | 1939 | Russian | Male |
| Sergey Kozlov | Сергей Козлов | New | Candidate | 1923 | 2011 | 1947 | Russian | Male |
| Gleb Kriulin | Глеб Криулин | Candidate | Candidate | 1923 | 1988 | 1945 | Belarusian | Male |
| Nikolay Kruchina | Николай Кручина | New | Member | 1928 | 1991 | 1949 | Russian | Male |
| Ivan Kudinov | Иван Кудинов | New | Candidate | 1922 | 1990 | 1946 | Russian | Male |
| Semyon Kurkotkin | Семё́н Курко́ткин | New | Member | 1917 | 1990 | 1940 | Russian | Male |
| Mikhail Lavrentyev | Михаи́л Лавре́нтьев | Candidate | Not | 1900 | 1980 | 1952 | Russian | Male |
| Voldemar Lein | Вольдемар Леин | New | Member | 1920 | 1987 | 1946 | Russian | Male |
| Yegor Ligachyov | Егор Лигачёв | New | Member | 1920 | 2021 | 1944 | Russian | Male |
| Semyon Lobov | Семён Лобов | Candidate | Not | 1913 | 1977 | 1940 | Russian | Male |
| Fodor Loshchenkov | Фодор Лощенков | Candidate | Member | 1915 | 2009 | 1943 | Russian | Male |
| Lidia Lykova | Лидия Лыкова | Candidate | Member | 1913 | 2016 | 1938 | Russian | Female |
| Viktor Makeyev | Ви́ктор Маке́ев | New | Member | 1924 | 1985 | 1942 | Russian | Male |
| Timbora Malbakhov | Тимбо́ра Мальба́хов | Candidate | Candidate | 1917 | 1999 | 1942 | Kabardian | Male |
| Viktor Maltsev | Виктор Мальцев | New | Member | 1917 | 2003 | 1945 | Russian | Male |
| Juozas Maniušis | Иосиф Манюшис | New | Candidate | 1910 | 1987 | 1945 | Lithuanian | Male |
| Aleksandr Mayorov | Александр Майоров | New | Candidate | 1920 | 2008 | 1942 | Russian | Male |
| Yuri Melkov | Ю́рий Мелько́в | New | Not | 1921 | 2003 | 1944 | Russian | Male |
| Fodor Meshkov | Фёдор Мешков | New | Member | 1915 | 1987 | 1987 | Russian | Male |
| Ivan Morozov | Иван Морозов | New | Member | 1924 | 1987 | 1943 | Russian | Male |
| Badal Muradyan | Бадал Мурадян | Candidate | Not | 1915 | 1991 | 1951 | Armenian | Male |
| Mirzamakhmud Musakhanov | Мирзамахмуд Мусаханов | Candidate | Member | 1912 | 1995 | 1943 | Uzbek | Male |
| Aleksandr Muzhitsky | Андрей Модогоев | Candidate | Not | 1912 | 1982 | 1932 | Ukrainian | Male |
| Viktor Nikonov | Виктор Никонов | New | Member | 1929 | 1993 | 1954 | Russian | Male |
| Vasily Okunev | Василий Окунев | New | Not | 1920 | 1995 | 1941 | Russian | Male |
| Oraz Orazmukhamedov | Ораз Оразмухамедов | New | Not | 1928 | Alive | 1948 | Turkmen | Male |
| Viktor Paputin | Виктор Папутин | New | Candidate | 1926 | 1979 | 1945 | Russian | Male |
| Pyotr Paskar | Пётр Паскарь | New | Candidate | 1929 | 2025 | 1956 | Moldovan | Male |
| Boris Pastukhov | Борис Пастухов | Candidate | Candidate | 1933 | 2021 | 1959 | Russian | Male |
| Grigory Pavlov | Григорий Павлов | Candidate | Member | 1913 | 1994 | 1940 | Russian | Male |
| Nikolai Petrovichev | Николай Петровичев | New | Candidate | 1918 | 2002 | 1939 | Russian | Male |
| Boris Petrovsky | Борис Петровский | Candidate | Candidate | 1908 | 2004 | 1942 | Russian | Male |
| Pyotr Pimenov | Пётр Пименов | Candidate | Candidate | 1915 | 1980 | 1943 | Russian | Male |
| Maria Poberey | Раиса Бельских | Candidate | Candidate | 1924 | 1981 | 1957 | Russian | Female |
| Yakiv Pogrebnyak | Я́ков Погребня́к | New | Candidate | 1928 | 2016 | 1943 | Ukrainian | Male |
| Mikhail Ponomarev | Михаил Пономарёв | Candidate | Member | 1918 | 2001 | 1939 | Russian | Male |
| Boris Popov | Борис Попов | Candidate | Member | 1909 | 1993 | 1931 | Russian | Male |
| Nikolay Psurtsev | Николай Псурцев | Candidate | Not | 1900 | 1980 | 1919 | Russian | Male |
| Aleksey Romanov | Алексе́й Рома́нов | Candidate | Candidate | 1908 | 1998 | 1939 | Russian | Male |
| Pyotr Rozenko | Пётр Розенко | Candidate | Candidate | 1907 | 1991 | 1943 | Ukrainian | Male |
| Vitālijs Rubenis | Николай Романов | Candidate | Member | 1914 | 1994 | 1939 | Latvian | Male |
| Jurijs Rubenis | Юрий Рубэн | New | Candidate | 1925 | 2004 | 1953 | Latvian | Male |
| Grigory Salmanov | Григорий Салманов | New | Not | 1922 | 1993 | 1944 | Russian | Male |
| Ekaterina Salnikova | Екатерина Сальникова | New | Not | 1928 | 2016 | 1957 | Russian | Female |
| Sergey Savin | Сергей Савин | New | Candidate | 1924 | 1990 | 1951 | Russian | Male |
| Nikolai Savinkin | Николай Савинкин | New | Candidate | 1913 | 1993 | 1927 | Russian | Male |
| Vladimir Semyonov | Владимир Семёнов | Candidate | Candidate | 1911 | 1992 | 1938 | Russian | Male |
| Ivan Serbin | Иван Сербин | Candidate | Candidate | 1910 | 1981 | 1931 | Russian | Male |
| Maksim Sergeyev | Максим Сергеев | New | Candidate | 1928 | 1987 | 1960 | Russian | Male |
| Valentin Shashin | Валентин Шашин | New | Member | 1916 | 1977 | 1940 | Belarusian | Male |
| Vasily Shauro | Василий Шауро | Candidate | Candidate | 1912 | 2007 | 1940 | Belarusian | Male |
| Sergey Shaydurov | Сергей Шайдуров | New | Candidate | 1926 | 1998 | 1952 | Russian | Male |
| Boris Shcherbina | Борис Щербина | Candidate | Member | 1919 | 1990 | 1939 | Ukrainian | Male |
| Aleksandra Shevchenko | Александра Шевченко | Candidate | Candidate | 1926 | 2000 | 1954 | Ukrainian | Female |
| Aleksandr Shibalov | Александр Шибалов | New | Member | 1913 | 1987 | 1945 | Russian | Male |
| Aleksandr Shitov | Александр Шитов | New | Candidate | 1925 | 2001 | 1955 | Russian | Male |
| Aleksandr Sidorenko | Александр Сидоренко | Candidate | Not | 1917 | 1982 | 1942 | Ukrainian | Male |
| Ivan Sinitsyn | Иван Синицын | Candidate | Candidate | 1917 | 1988 | 1940 | Russian | Male |
| Aleksandr Sizov | Виталий Сологуб | New | Died | 1926 | 2004 | 1947 | Russian | Male |
| Igor Skulkov | Игорь Скулков | Candidate | Died | 1913 | 1971 | 1932 | Russian | Male |
| Ivan Slazhnov | Иван Слажнев | Candidate | Not | 1913 | 1978 | 1939 | Ukrainian | Male |
| Aleksandr I. Smirnov | Александр И. Смирнов | Candidate | Candidate | 1912 | 1997 | 1937 | Russian | Male |
| Aleksandr N. Smirnov | Александр Н. Смирнов | Candidate | Died | 1909 | 1972 | 1930 | Russian | Male |
| Vasily Smirnov | Василий Смирно́в | Candidate | Not | 1905 | 1979 | 1925 | Russian | Male |
| Vitaly Sologub | Виталий Сологуб | New | Candidate | 1926 | 2004 | 1927 | Ukrainian | Male |
| Motiejus Šumauskas | Мотеюс Шумаускас | Candidate | Not | 1905 | 1982 | 1924 | Lithuanian | Male |
| Akhmatbek Suyumbayev | Ахматбек Суюмбаев | New | Candidate | 1920 | 1993 | 1942 | Kyrghyz | Male |
| Alexander Tarasov | Алекса́ндр Тара́сов | Candidate | Died | 1911 | 1975 | 1940 | Russian | Male |
| Nikolai Tarasov | Николай Тара́сов | New | Member | 1911 | 2010 | 1942 | Russian | Male |
| Vasily Taratuta | Василий Таратута | New | Member | 1930 | 2008 | 1955 | Ukrainian | Male |
| Nikifor Tartyshev | Ники́фор Та́ртышев | New | Not | 1920 | 2008 | 1955 | Russian | Male |
| Lev Tolkunov | Лев Толкунов | Candidate | Member | 1919 | 1989 | 1943 | Russian | Male |
| Vladimir Tolubko | Влади́мир Толу́бко | New | Member | 1914 | 1989 | 1939 | Ukrainian | Male |
| Ivan Tretyak | Иван Третьяк | New | Member | 1923 | 2007 | 1943 | Ukrainian | Male |
| Mikhail Trunov | Михаил Трунов | New | Member | 1931 | 2010 | 1955 | Russian | Male |
| Semon Tsvigun | Семён Цвигу́н | New | Candidate | 1917 | 1982 | 1940 | Ukrainian | Male |
| Aleksandr Udalov | Александр Удалов | New | Candidate | 1922 | 2014 | 1949 | Russian | Male |
| Ivan Udaltsov | Ива́н Удальцо́в | New | Not | 1918 | 1995 | 1943 | Russian | Male |
| Saidmakhmud Usmanov | Саидмахмуд Усманов | New | Not | 1929 | 2000 | 1955 | Uzbek | Male |
| Ivan Vladychenko | Владимир Толубко | Candidate | Candidate | 1924 | 2022 | 1943 | Ukrainian | Male |
| Vladimir Vinogradov | Николай Вороновский | New | Not | 1921 | 1997 | 1942 | Russian | Male |
| Nikolay Voronovsky | Николай Вороновский | New | Died | 1914 | 1973 | 1939 | Russian | Male |
| Mikhail Vsevolozhsky | Михаи́л Все́воложский | Candidate | Member | 1917 | 2000 | 1944 | Russian | Male |
| Vladimir Yagodkin | Влади́мир Я́годкин | Candidate | Member | 1928 | 1985 | 1950 | Russian | Male |
| Fuad Yakubovsky | Ива́н Якубо́вский | Candidate | Died | 1908 | 1975 | 1944 | Tatar | Male |
| Mikhail Yangel | Михаил Янгель | Candidate | Died | 1911 | 1971 | 1931 | Ukrainian | Male |
| Anatoly Yegorov | Анато́лий Его́ров | Candidate | Member | 1924 | 1982 | 1944 | Russian | Male |
| Shakhmardan Yesenov | Шахмардан Есенов | New | Not | 1927 | 1994 | 1956 | Kazakh | Male |
| Konstantin Zarodov | Константин Зародов | Candidate | Candidate | 1920 | 1982 | 1940 | Russian | Male |
| Nikolay Zhurin | Николай Журин | Candidate | Not | 1908 | 1996 | 1930 | Russian | Male |
