= General secretaryship of Mikhail Gorbachev =

Soviet administration from 1985 - 1991

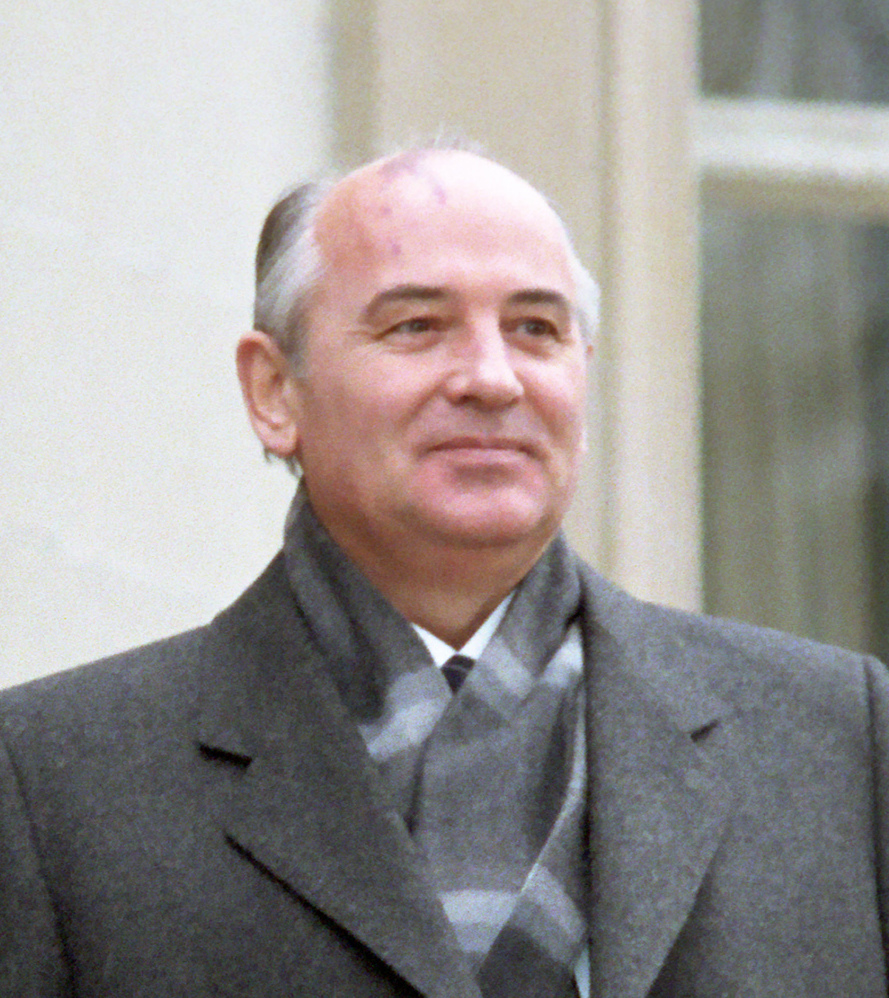
Gorbachev in 1985 at a summit in Geneva, Switzerland

On 11 March 1985, Mikhail Gorbachev was elected the eighth General Secretary of the Communist Party of the Soviet Union by the Politburo of the CPSU after the death of Konstantin Chernenko. He was the last general secretary and Soviet leader before the dissolution of the Soviet Union.

In 1978, he returned to Moscow to become a Secretary of the party's Central Committee; he joined the governing Politburo (25th term) as a non-voting candidate member in 1979 and a voting member in 1980.

While Gorbachev wanted to preserve the Soviet Union and Marxist-Leninist ideals, he recognised the need for significant reforms. He decided to withdraw troops from the Soviet–Afghan War and met with United States president Ronald Reagan at the Reykjavik Summit to discuss the limitation of nuclear weapons production and ending the Cold War. He also proposed a three-stage programme for abolishing the world's nuclear weapons by the end of the 20th century.

Domestically, his policy of glasnost ("openness") allowed for the improvement of freedom of speech and free press, while his perestroika ("restructuring") sought to decentralize economic decision-making to improve its efficiency. Ultimately, Gorbachev's democratization efforts and formation of the elected Congress of People's Deputies undermined the supremacy the CPSU had in Soviet governance. When various Warsaw Pact countries abandoned Marxist–Leninist governance in 1989, he declined to intervene militarily. Growing nationalist sentiment within constituent republics threatened to break up the Soviet Union, leading the hardliners within the Communist Party to launch an unsuccessful coup against Gorbachev in August 1991. After the attempted coup, the Soviet Union dissolved against Gorbachev's wishes.

== Background ==
In November 1978, Gorbachev was appointed to the Central Committee's Secretariat for Agriculture (25th term), replacing his old patron Fyodor Kulakov, who had died of a heart attack. His appointment had been approved unanimously by the Central Committee's members. The harvests of 1979, 1980, and 1981 were all poor, due largely to weather conditions, and the country had to import increasing quantities of grain.He had growing concerns about the country's agricultural management system, coming to regard it as overly centralized and requiring more bottom-up decision making; he raised these points at his first speech at a Central Committee Plenum, given in July 1978. He began to have concerns about other policies too. In December 1979, the Soviets sent the armed forces into neighbouring Afghanistan to support its Soviet-aligned government against Islamist insurgents; Gorbachev privately thought it a mistake. At times he openly supported the government position; in October 1980 he for instance endorsed Soviet calls for Poland's Marxist–Leninist government to crack down on growing internal dissent in that country. That same month, he was promoted from a candidate non-voting member to a full voting member of the Politburo (25th term), becoming the youngest member of the highest decision-making authority in the Communist Party.

After Leonid Brezhnev's death in November 1982, Yuri Andropov succeeded him as General Secretary of the Communist Party, the de facto leader in the Soviet Union. Gorbachev was enthusiastic about the appointment. However, although Gorbachev hoped that Andropov would introduce liberalizing reforms, the latter carried out only personnel shifts rather than structural change. Gorbachev became Andropov's closest ally in the Politburo; with Andropov's encouragement, Gorbachev sometimes chaired Politburo meetings. Andropov encouraged Gorbachev to expand into policy areas other than agriculture, preparing him for future higher office. In April 1983, in a sign of growing ascendancy, Gorbachev delivered the annual speech marking the birthday of the Soviet founder Vladimir Lenin; this required him re-reading many of Lenin's later writings, in which the latter had called for reform in the context of the New Economic Policy of the 1920s, and encouraged Gorbachev's own conviction that reform was needed. In May 1983, Gorbachev was sent to Canada, where he met Prime Minister Pierre Trudeau and spoke to the Canadian Parliament. There, he met and befriended the Soviet ambassador, Aleksandr Yakovlev, who later became a key political ally.

In February 1984, Andropov died; on his deathbed he indicated his desire that Gorbachev succeed him. Many in the Central Committee nevertheless thought the 53-year-old Gorbachev was too young and inexperienced. Instead, Konstantin Chernenko—a longstanding Brezhnev ally—was appointed general secretary, but he too was in very poor health. Chernenko was often too sick to chair Politburo meetings, with Gorbachev stepping in last minute. Gorbachev continued to cultivate allies both in the Kremlin and beyond, and also gave the main speech at a conference on Soviet ideology, where he angered party hardliners by implying that the country required reform.

In April 1984, Gorbachev was appointed chair of the Foreign Affairs Committee of the Soviet legislature, a largely honorific position. In June he traveled to Italy as a Soviet representative for the funeral of Italian Communist Party leader Enrico Berlinguer, and in September to Sofia, the capital of Bulgaria, to attend celebrations of the fortieth anniversary of its liberation from the Nazis by the Red Army. In December, he visited Britain at the request of its prime minister Margaret Thatcher; she was aware that he was a potential reformer and wanted to meet him. At the end of the visit, Thatcher said: "I like Mr. Gorbachev. We can do business together". He felt that the visit helped to erode Andrei Gromyko's dominance of Soviet foreign policy while at the same time sending a signal to the United States government that he wanted to improve Soviet–US relations.

== Rise to power ==
After the death of Chernenko on 10 March 1985, Andrei Gromyko proposed Gorbachev as the next general secretary. And since Gromyko was a longstanding party member, his recommendation carried great weight among the Central Committee. Gorbachev expected much opposition to his nomination as general secretary, but ultimately the rest of the Politburo supported him. Shortly after Chernenko's death, on 11 March 1985, the Politburo unanimously elected Gorbachev as his successor. He thus became the eighth leader of the Soviet Union. Few in the government imagined that he would be as radical a reformer as he proved. Although he was not a well-known figure to the Soviet public, there was widespread relief that the new leader was not elderly and ailing. Gorbachev's first public appearance as leader was at Chernenko's Red Square funeral, held on 14 March. Two months after being elected, he left Moscow for the first time, traveling to Leningrad, where he spoke to assembled crowds. In June he traveled to Ukraine, in July to Belarus, and in September to Tyumen Oblast, urging party members in these areas to take more responsibility for fixing local problems.

== Early years ==
Gorbachev's leadership style differed from that of his predecessors. He would stop to talk to civilians on the street, forbade the display of his portrait at the 1985 Red Square holiday celebrations, and encouraged frank and open discussions at Politburo meetings. To the West, Gorbachev was seen as a more moderate and less threatening Soviet leader; some Western commentators however believed this an act to lull Western governments into a false sense of security. His wife was his closest adviser, and took on the unofficial role of a "first lady" by appearing with him on foreign trips; her public visibility was a breach of standard practice and generated resentment. His other close aides were Georgy Shakhnazarov and Anatoly Chernyaev.

Gorbachev was aware that the Politburo could remove him from office, and that he could not pursue more radical reform without a majority of supporters in the Politburo. He sought to remove several older members from the Politburo, encouraging Grigory Romanov, Nikolai Tikhonov, and Viktor Grishin into retirement. He promoted Gromyko to head of state, a largely ceremonial role with little influence, and moved his own ally, Eduard Shevardnadze, to Gromyko's former post in charge of foreign policy. Other allies whom he saw promoted were Yakovlev, Anatoly Lukyanov, and Vadim Medvedev. Another of those promoted by Gorbachev was Boris Yeltsin, who was made a secretary of the Central Committee (26th term) in July 1985. Most of these appointees were from a new generation of well-educated officials who had been frustrated during the Brezhnev era. In his first year, 14 of the 23 heads of department in the secretariat were replaced. Doing so, Gorbachev secured dominance in the Politburo within a year, faster than either Joseph Stalin, Nikita Khrushchev, or Brezhnev had achieved.

=== Domestic policy ===
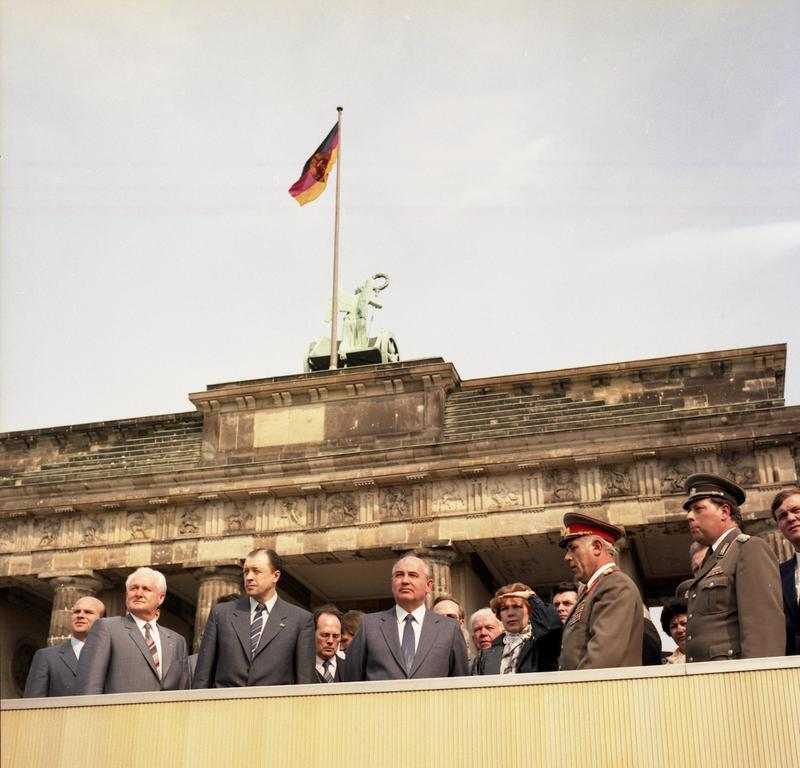
Gorbachev at the Brandenburg Gate in 1986 during a visit to East Germany

Gorbachev recurrently employed the term perestroika, first used publicly in March 1984. He saw perestroika as encompassing a complex series of reforms to restructure society and the economy. He was concerned by the country's low productivity, poor work ethic, and inferior quality goods; like several economists, he feared this would lead to the country becoming a second-rate power. The first stage of Gorbachev's perestroika was uskoreniye ("acceleration"), a term he used regularly in the first two years of his leadership. The Soviet Union was behind the United States in many areas of production, but Gorbachev claimed that it would accelerate industrial output to match that of the US by 2000. The Five Year Plan of 1985–1990 was targeted to expand machine building by 50 to 100%. To boost agricultural productivity, he merged five ministries and a state committee into a single entity, Agroprom, although by late 1986 he acknowledged this merger as a failure.

The purpose of reform was to prop up the centrally planned economy—not to transition to market socialism. Speaking in late summer 1985 to the secretaries for economic affairs of the central committees of the East European communist parties, Gorbachev said: "Many of you see the solution to your problems in resorting to market mechanisms in place of direct planning. Some of you look at the market as a lifesaver for your economies. But, comrades, you should not think about lifesavers but about the ship, and the ship is socialism." Gorbachev's perestroika also entailed attempts to move away from technocratic management of the economy by increasingly involving the labor force in industrial production. He was of the view that once freed from the strong control of central planners, state-owned enterprises would act as market agents. Gorbachev and other Soviet leaders did not anticipate opposition to the perestroika reforms; according to their interpretation of Marxism, they believed that in a socialist society like the Soviet Union there would not be "antagonistic contradictions". However, there would come to be a public perception in the country that many bureaucrats were paying lip service to the reforms while trying to undermine them. He also initiated the concept of gospriyomka (state acceptance of production) during his time as leader, which represented quality control. In April 1986, he introduced an agrarian reform which linked salaries to output and allowed collective farms to sell 30% of their produce directly to shops or co-operatives rather than giving it all to the state for distribution. In a September 1986 speech, he embraced the idea of reintroducing market economics to the country alongside limited private enterprise, citing Lenin's New Economic Policy as a precedent; he nevertheless stressed that he did not regard this as a return to capitalism.

In the Soviet Union, alcohol consumption had risen steadily between 1950 and 1985. By the 1980s, drunkenness was a major social problem and Andropov had planned a major campaign to limit alcohol consumption, but died before the plan was put into action. Encouraged by his wife, Gorbachev—who believed the campaign would improve health and work efficiency—oversaw its implementation. Alcohol production was reduced by around 40%, the legal drinking age rose from 18 to 21, alcohol prices were increased, stores were banned from selling it before 2 pm, and tougher penalties were introduced for workplace or public drunkenness and home production of alcohol. The program also recommended that drinking scenes be censored from old movies. The All-Union Voluntary Society for the Struggle for Temperance was formed to promote sobriety; it had over 14 million members within three years. Anti-alcohol propaganda was distributed, mostly by way of billboards extolling the virtues of a sober workforce. As a result, crime rates fell and life expectancy grew slightly between 1986 and 1987. However, bootleg liquor production rose considerably, and the reform imposed large costs on the Soviet economy, namely from decreasing tax collections from declining alcohol sales, resulting in losses of up to US$100 billion between 1985 and 1990. Another serious problem was the strain on the Soviet healthcare system, as uneducated Soviet citizens had resorted to drinking rubbing alcohol, nail polish remover or cologne as dangerous substitutes, resulting in a rise in poisoning cases. Gorbachev later considered the campaign to have been an error, and it was terminated in October 1988. After it ended, it took several years for production to return to previous levels, after which alcohol consumption soared in Russia between 1990 and 1993.

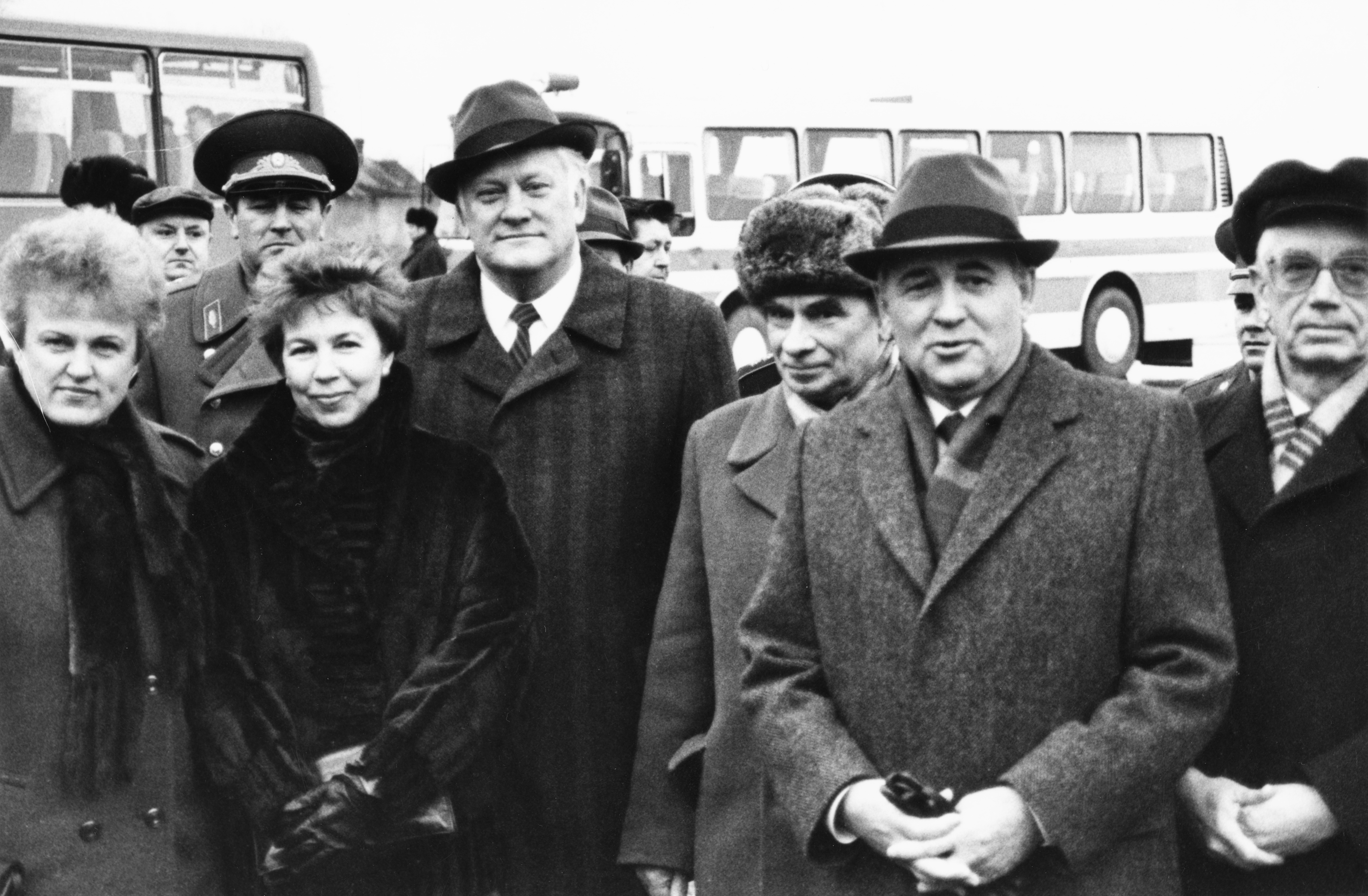
Gorbachev's visit to Vilnius in 1990 in an attempt to stop Lithuania's declaration of independence, which passed two months later

In the second year of his leadership, Gorbachev began speaking of glasnost, or "openness". According to Doder and Branson, this meant "greater openness and candour in government affairs and for an interplay of different and sometimes conflicting views in political debates, in the press, and in Soviet culture". Encouraging reformers into prominent media positions, he brought in Sergei Zalygin as head of Novy Mir magazine and Yegor Yakovlev as editor-in-chief of Moscow News. He made the historian Yury Afanasyev dean of the State Historical Archive Faculty, from where Afansiev could press for the opening of secret archives and the reassessment of Soviet history. Prominent dissidents like Andrei Sakharov were freed from internal exile or prison. Gorbachev saw glasnost as a necessary measure to ensure perestroika by alerting the Soviet populace to the nature of the country's problems in the hope that they would support his efforts to fix them. Particularly popular among the Soviet intelligentsia, who became key Gorbachev supporters, glasnost boosted his domestic popularity but alarmed many Communist Party hardliners. For many Soviet citizens, this newfound level of freedom of speech and press—and its accompanying revelations about the country's past—was uncomfortable.

Some in the party thought Gorbachev was not going far enough in his reforms; a prominent liberal critic was Yeltsin. He had risen rapidly since 1985, attaining the role of party secretary in Moscow. Like many members of the government, Gorbachev was skeptical of Yeltsin, believing that he engaged in too much self-promotion. Yeltsin was also critical of Gorbachev, regarding him as patronizing. In early 1986, Yeltsin began sniping at Gorbachev in Politburo meetings. At the Twenty-Seventh Party Congress in February, Yeltsin called for more far-reaching reforms than Gorbachev was initiating and criticized the party leadership, although he did not cite Gorbachev by name, claiming that a new cult of personality was forming. Gorbachev then opened the floor to responses, after which attendees publicly criticized Yeltsin for several hours. After this, Gorbachev also criticized Yeltsin, claiming that he cared only for himself and was "politically illiterate". Yeltsin then resigned both as Moscow party secretary and as a member of the Politburo. From this point, tensions between the two men developed into a mutual hatred.

In April 1986 the Chernobyl disaster occurred. In the immediate aftermath, officials fed Gorbachev incorrect information to downplay the incident. As the scale of the disaster became apparent, 336,000 people were evacuated from the area around Chernobyl. Taubman noted that the disaster marked "a turning point for Gorbachev and the Soviet regime". Several days after it occurred, he gave a televised report to the nation. He cited the disaster as evidence for what he regarded as widespread problems in Soviet society, such as shoddy workmanship and workplace inertia. Gorbachev later described the incident as one which made him appreciate the scale of incompetence and cover-ups in the Soviet Union. From April to the end of the year, Gorbachev became increasingly open in his criticism of the Soviet system, including food production, state bureaucracy, the military draft, and the large size of the prison population.

=== Foreign policy ===
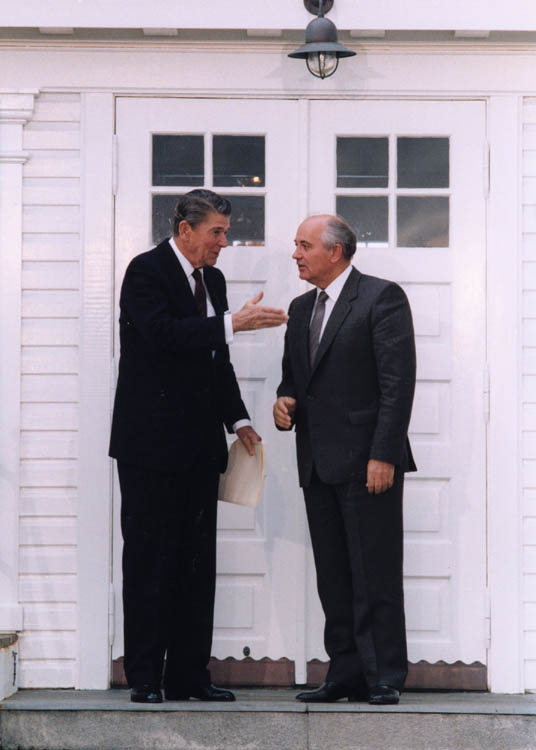
US president Reagan and Gorbachev meeting in Iceland, 1986

In a May 1985 speech given to the Soviet Foreign Ministry—the first time a Soviet leader had directly addressed his country's diplomats—Gorbachev spoke of a "radical restructuring" of foreign policy. A major issue facing his leadership was Soviet involvement in the Afghan Civil War, which had then been going on for over five years. Over the course of the war, the Soviet Army took heavy casualties and there was much opposition to Soviet involvement among both the public and military. On becoming leader, Gorbachev saw withdrawal from the war as a key priority. In October 1985, he met with Afghan Marxist leader Babrak Karmal, urging him to acknowledge the lack of widespread public support for his government and pursue a power sharing agreement with the opposition. That month, the Politburo approved Gorbachev's decision to withdraw combat troops from Afghanistan, although the last troops did not leave until February 1989.

Gorbachev had inherited a renewed period of high tension in the Cold War. He believed strongly in the need to sharply improve relations with the United States; he was appalled at the prospect of nuclear war, was aware that the Soviet Union was unlikely to win the arms race and thought that the continued focus on high military spending was detrimental to his desire for domestic reform. US president Ronald Reagan publicly appeared to not want a de-escalation of tensions, having scrapped détente and arms controls, initiating a military build-up, and calling the Soviet Union the "evil empire".

Both Gorbachev and Reagan wanted a summit to discuss the Cold War, but each faced some opposition to such a move within their respective governments. They agreed to hold a summit in Geneva, Switzerland, in November 1985. In the buildup to this, Gorbachev sought to improve relations with the US's NATO allies, visiting France in October 1985 to meet with President François Mitterrand. At the Geneva summit, discussions between Gorbachev and Reagan were sometimes heated, and Gorbachev was initially frustrated that his US counterpart "does not seem to hear what I am trying to say". As well as discussing the Cold War proxy conflicts in Afghanistan and Nicaragua and human rights issues, the pair discussed the US's Strategic Defense Initiative (SDI), to which Gorbachev was strongly opposed. The duo's wives also met and spent time together at the summit. The summit ended with a joint commitment to avoiding nuclear war and to meet for two further summits: in Washington, DC, in 1986 and in Moscow in 1987. Following the conference, Gorbachev traveled to Prague to inform other Warsaw Pact leaders of developments.

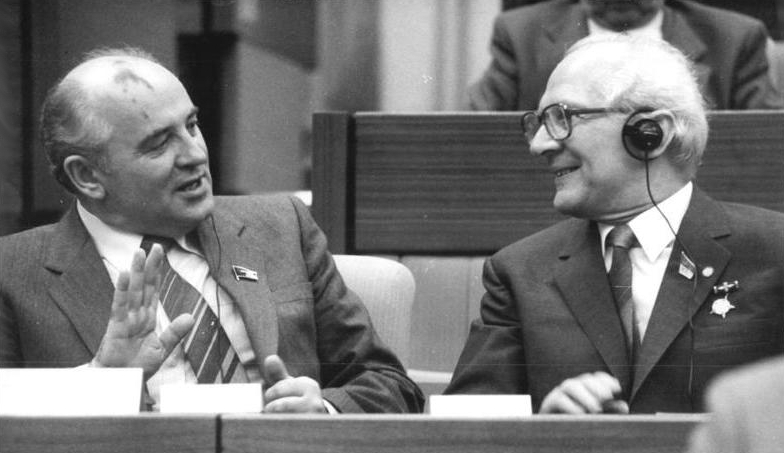
Gorbachev with Erich Honecker of East Germany. Privately, Gorbachev told Chernyaev that Honecker was a "scumbag".

In January 1986, Gorbachev publicly proposed a three-stage programme for abolishing the world's nuclear weapons by the end of the 20th century. An agreement was then reached to meet with Reagan in Reykjavík, Iceland, in October 1986. Gorbachev wanted to secure guarantees that SDI would not be implemented, and in return was willing to offer concessions, including a 50% reduction in Soviet long range nuclear missiles. Both leaders agreed with the shared goal of abolishing nuclear weapons, but Gorbachev ultimately thought that too out of reach and instead proposed a mutual elimination of all medium-range nuclear missiles. Reagan refused to terminate the SDI program and no deal was reached. After the summit, many of Reagan's allies criticized him for going along with the idea of abolishing nuclear weapons. Gorbachev meanwhile told the Politburo that Reagan was "extraordinarily primitive, troglodyte, and intellectually feeble".

In his relations with the developing world, Gorbachev found many of its leaders professing revolutionary socialist credentials or a pro-Soviet attitude—such as Libya's Muammar Gaddafi and Syria's Hafez al-Assad—frustrating, and his best personal relationship was instead with India's prime minister, Rajiv Gandhi. He thought that the "socialist camp" of Marxist–Leninist governed states—the Eastern Bloc countries, North Korea, Vietnam, and Cuba—were a drain on the Soviet economy, receiving a far greater amount of goods from the Soviet Union than they collectively gave in return. He sought improved relations with China, a country whose Marxist government had severed ties with the Soviets in the Sino-Soviet split and had since undergone its own structural reform. In June 1985 he signed a US$14 billion five-year trade agreement with the country and in July 1986, he proposed troop reductions along the Soviet-Chinese border, hailing China as "a great socialist country". He made clear his desire for Soviet membership of the Asian Development Bank and for greater ties to Pacific countries, especially China and Japan.

== Later years ==
=== Domestic reforms ===
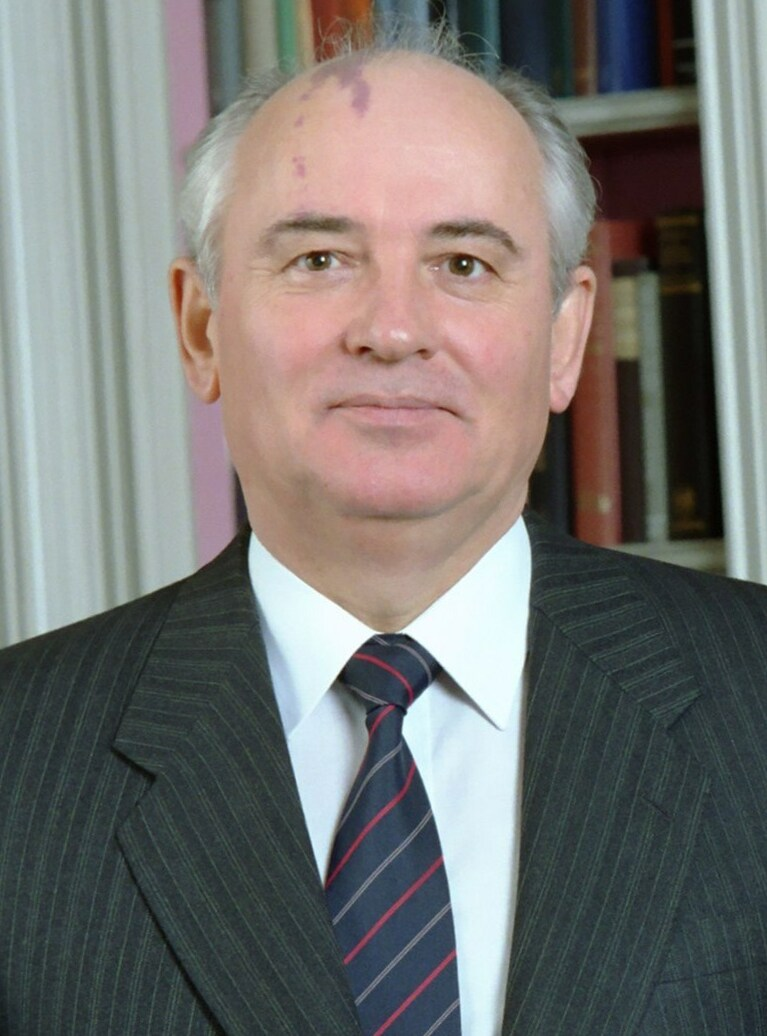
Mikhail Gorbachev in the White House Library, 1987

In January 1987, Gorbachev attended a Central Committee plenum where he talked about perestroika and democratization while criticizing widespread corruption. He considered putting a proposal to allow multi-party elections into his speech, but decided against doing so. After the plenum, he focused his attentions on economic reform, holding discussions with government officials and economists. Many economists proposed reducing ministerial controls on the economy and allowing state-owned enterprises to set their own targets; Nikolai Ryzhkov and other government figures were skeptical. In June, Gorbachev finished his report on economic reform. It reflected a compromise: ministers would retain the ability to set output targets but these would not be considered binding. That month, a plenum accepted his recommendations and the Supreme Soviet passed a "law on enterprises" implementing the changes. Economic problems remained: by the late 1980s there were still widespread shortages of basic goods, rising inflation, and declining living standards. These stoked a number of miners' strikes in 1989.

By 1987, the ethos of glasnost had spread through Soviet society: journalists were writing increasingly openly, many economic problems were being publicly revealed, and studies appeared that critically reassessed Soviet history. Gorbachev was broadly supportive, describing glasnost as "the crucial, irreplaceable weapon of perestroika". He nevertheless insisted that people should use the newfound freedom responsibly, stating that journalists and writers should avoid "sensationalism" and be "completely objective" in their reporting. Nearly two hundred previously restricted Soviet films were publicly released, and a range of Western films were also made available. In 1989, Soviet responsibility for the 1940 Katyn massacre was finally revealed.

In September 1987, the government stopped jamming the signal of the British Broadcasting Corporation and Voice of America. The reforms also included greater tolerance of religion; an Easter service was broadcast on Soviet television for the first time and the millennium celebrations of the Russian Orthodox Church were given media attention. Independent organizations appeared, most supportive of Gorbachev, although the largest, Pamyat, was ultra-nationalist and antisemitic in nature. Gorbachev also announced that Soviet Jews wishing to migrate to Israel would be allowed to do so, something previously prohibited.

In August 1987, Gorbachev holidayed in Nizhnyaya Oreanda in Oreanda, Crimea, there writing Perestroika: New Thinking for Our Country and Our World at the suggestion of US publishers. For the 70th anniversary of the October Revolution of 1917—which brought Lenin and the Communist Party to power—Gorbachev produced a speech on "October and Perestroika: The Revolution Continues". Delivered to a ceremonial joint session of the Central Committee and the Supreme Soviet in the Kremlin Palace of Congresses, it praised Lenin but criticized Stalin for overseeing mass human rights abuses. Party hardliners thought the speech went too far; liberalisers thought it did not go far enough.

In March 1988, the magazine Sovetskaya Rossiya published an open letter by the teacher Nina Andreyeva. It criticized elements of Gorbachev's reforms, attacking what she regarded as the denigration of the Stalinist era and arguing that a reformer clique—whom she implied were mostly Jews and ethnic minorities—were to blame. Over 900 Soviet newspapers reprinted it and anti-reformists rallied around it; many reformers panicked, fearing a backlash against perestroika. On returning from Yugoslavia, Gorbachev called a Politburo meeting to discuss the letter, at which he confronted those hardliners supporting its sentiment. Ultimately, the Politburo arrived at a unanimous decision to express disapproval of Andreyeva's letter and publish a rebuttal in Pravda. Yakovlev and Gorbachev's rebuttal claimed that those who "look everywhere for internal enemies" were "not patriots" and presented Stalin's "guilt for massive repressions and lawlessness" as "enormous and unforgiveable".

=== Forming the Congress of People's Deputies ===
Although the next party congress was not scheduled until 1991, Gorbachev convened the 19th Party Conference in its place in June 1988. He hoped that by allowing a broader range of people to attend than at previous conferences, he would gain additional support for his reforms. With sympathetic officials and academics, Gorbachev drafted plans for reforms that would shift power away from the Politburo and towards the soviets. While the soviets had become largely powerless bodies that rubber-stamped Politburo policies, he wanted them to become year-round legislatures. He proposed the formation of a new institution, the Congress of People's Deputies, whose members were to be elected in a largely free vote. This congress would in turn elect a USSR Supreme Soviet, which would do most of the legislating.

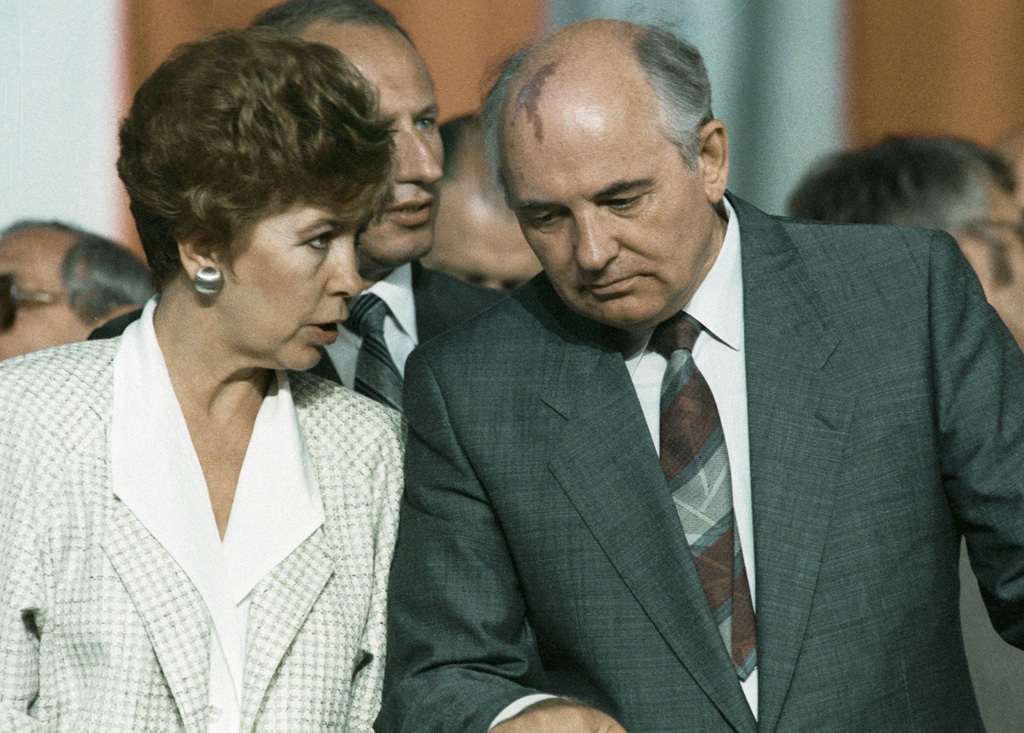
Gorbachev and his wife Raisa on a trip to Poland in 1988

These proposals reflected Gorbachev's desire for more democracy; however, in his view there was a major impediment in that the Soviet people had developed a "slave psychology" after centuries of Tsarist autocracy and Marxist–Leninist authoritarianism. Held at the Kremlin Palace of Congresses, the conference brought together 5,000 delegates and featured arguments between hardliners and liberalisers. The proceedings were televised, and for the first time since the 1920s, voting was not unanimous. In the months following the conference, Gorbachev focused on redesigning and streamlining the party apparatus; the Central Committee staff—which then numbered around 3,000—was halved, while various Central Committee departments were merged to cut down the overall number from twenty to nine.

In March and April 1989, elections to the new Congress were held. Of the 2,250 legislators to be elected, one hundred—termed the "Red Hundred" by the press—were directly chosen by the Communist Party, with Gorbachev ensuring many were reformists. Although over 85% of elected deputies were party members, many of those elected—including Sakharov and Yeltsin—were liberalisers. Gorbachev was happy with the result, describing it as "an enormous political victory under extraordinarily difficult circumstances". The new Congress convened in May 1989. Gorbachev was then elected its chair—the new de facto head of state—with 2,123 votes in favor to 87 against. Its sessions were televised live, and its members elected the new Supreme Soviet. At the Congress, Sakharov spoke repeatedly, exasperating Gorbachev with his calls for greater liberalization and the introduction of private property. When Sakharov died shortly after, Yeltsin became the figurehead of the liberal opposition.

=== Assassination attempt ===
Gorbachev was the target of an assassination attempt during 1990 October Revolution Parade. The would-be assassin, Aleksandr Shmonov, fired two bullets before being overpowered by police. Gorbachev was not wounded in the incident and was surprised to learn that there had been an attempt on his life, as he hadn't even noticed it.

=== Relations with China and Western states ===
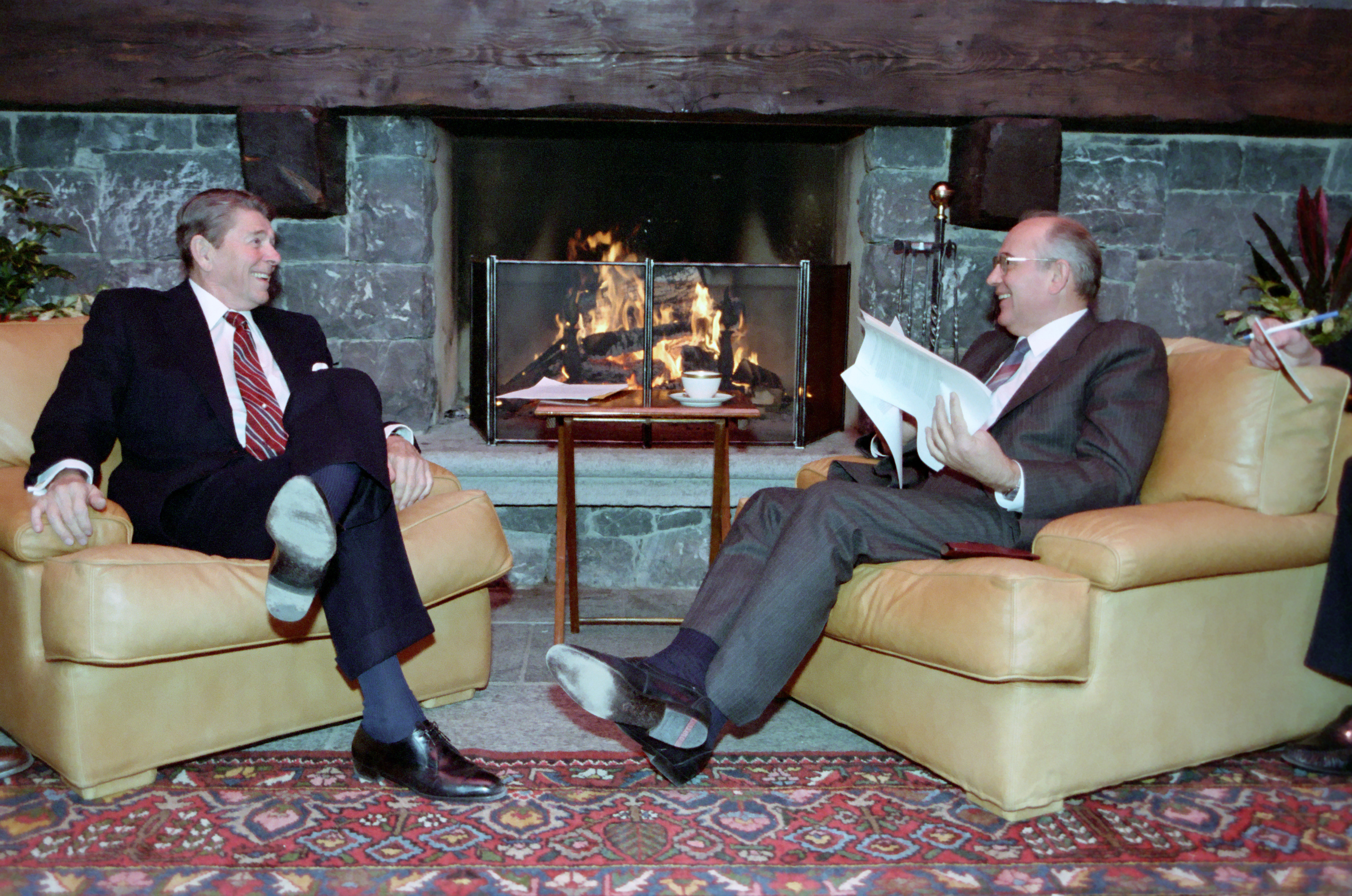
Gorbachev in one-to-one discussions with Reagan at a summit in Geneva, Switzerland, 1985

Gorbachev tried to improve relations with the UK, France, and West Germany; like previous Soviet leaders, he was interested in pulling Western Europe away from US influence. Calling for greater pan-European co-operation, he publicly spoke of a "Common European Home" and of a Europe "from the Atlantic to the Urals". In March 1987, Thatcher visited Gorbachev in Moscow; despite their ideological differences, they liked one another. In April 1989 he visited London, lunching with Elizabeth II. In May 1987, Gorbachev again visited France, and in November 1988 Mitterrand visited him in Moscow. The West German chancellor, Helmut Kohl, had initially offended Gorbachev by comparing him to Nazi propagandist Joseph Goebbels, although he later informally apologized and in October 1988 visited Moscow. In June 1989 Gorbachev then visited Kohl in West Germany. In November 1989 he also visited Italy, meeting with Pope John Paul II. Gorbachev's relationships with these West European leaders were typically far warmer than those he had with their Eastern Bloc counterparts.

Gorbachev continued to pursue good relations with China to heal the Sino-Soviet Split. In May 1989 he visited Beijing and there met its leader Deng Xiaoping; Deng shared Gorbachev's belief in economic reform but rejected calls for democratization. Pro-democracy students had massed in Tiananmen Square during Gorbachev's visit but after he left were massacred by troops. Gorbachev did not condemn the massacre publicly but it reinforced his commitment not to use violent force in dealing with pro-democracy protests in the Eastern Bloc.

Following the failures of earlier talks with the US, in February 1987, Gorbachev held a conference in Moscow, titled "For a World without Nuclear Weapons, for Mankind's Survival", which was attended by various international celebrities and politicians. By publicly pushing for nuclear disarmament, Gorbachev sought to give the Soviet Union the moral high ground and weaken the West's self-perception of moral superiority. Aware that Reagan would not budge on SDI, Gorbachev focused on reducing "Intermediate-Range Nuclear Forces", to which Reagan was receptive. In April 1987, Gorbachev discussed the issue with US secretary of state George P. Shultz in Moscow; he agreed to eliminate the Soviets' SS-23 rockets and allow US inspectors to visit Soviet military facilities to ensure compliance. There was hostility to such compromises from the Soviet military, but following the May 1987 Mathias Rust incident—in which a West German teenager was able to fly undetected from Finland and land in Red Square—Gorbachev fired many senior military figures for incompetence. In December 1987, Gorbachev visited Washington, DC, where he and Reagan signed the Intermediate-Range Nuclear Forces Treaty. Taubman called it "one of the highest points of Gorbachev's career".

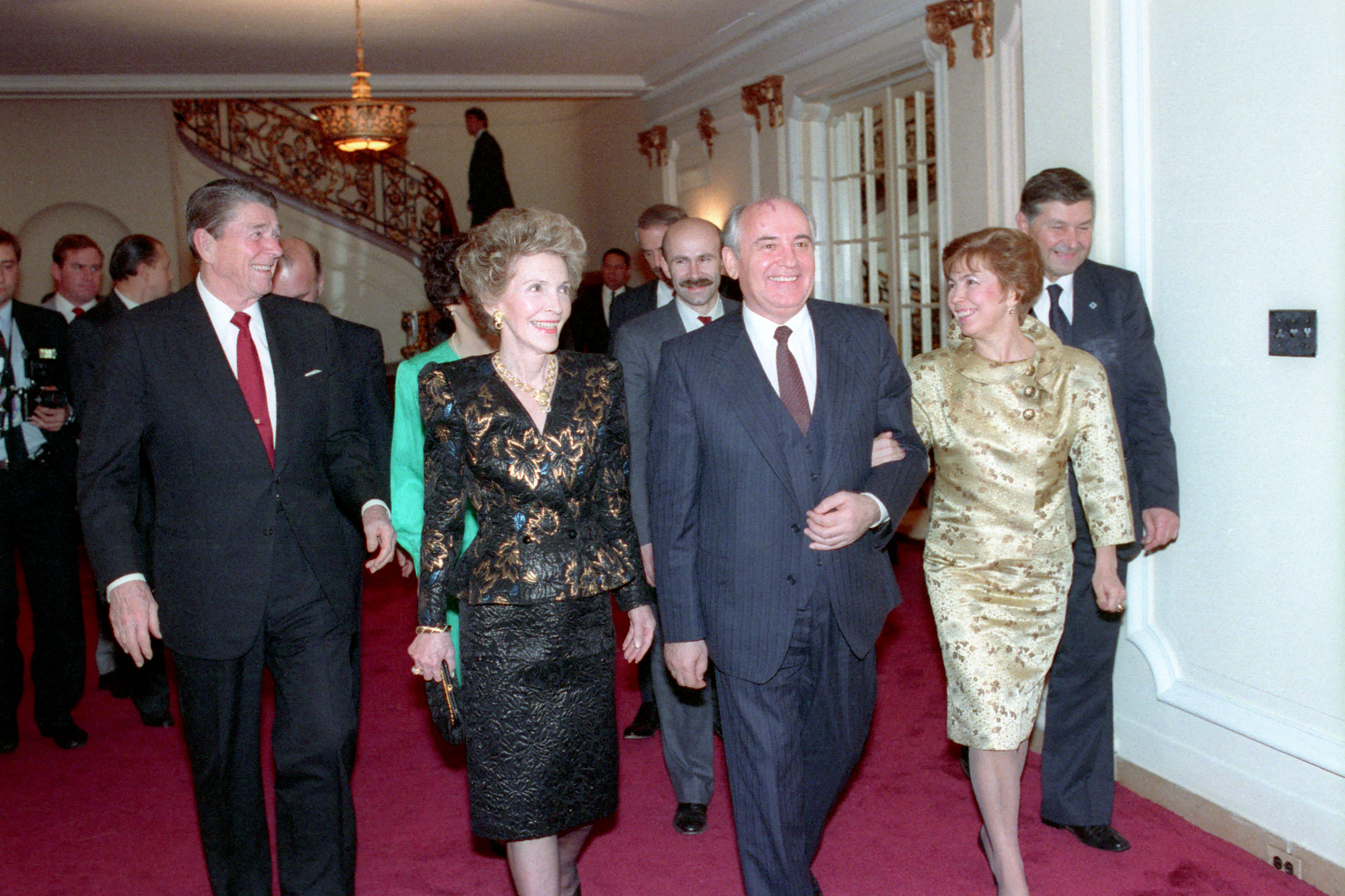
Reagan and Gorbachev with wives (Nancy and Raisa, respectively) attending a dinner at the Soviet Embassy in Washington, 1987

A second US–Soviet summit occurred in Moscow in May–June 1988, which Gorbachev expected to be largely symbolic. Again, he and Reagan criticized each other's countries—Reagan raising Soviet restrictions on religious freedom; Gorbachev highlighting poverty and racial discrimination in the US, but Gorbachev related that they spoke "on friendly terms". They reached an agreement on notifying each other before conducting ballistic missile tests and made agreements on transport, fishing, and radio navigation. At the summit, Reagan told reporters that he no longer considered the Soviet Union an "evil empire" and the two revealed that they considered themselves friends.

The third summit was held in New York City in December. Arriving there, Gorbachev gave a speech to the United Nations General Assembly where he announced a unilateral reduction in the Soviet armed forces by 500,000; he also announced that 50,000 troops would be withdrawn from Central and Eastern Europe. He then met with Reagan and President-elect George H. W. Bush, following which he rushed home, skipping a planned visit to Cuba, to deal with the Armenian earthquake. On becoming US president, Bush appeared interested in continuing talks with Gorbachev but wanted to appear tougher on the Soviets than Reagan, and had to allay criticism from the right wing of his Republican Party. In December 1989, Gorbachev and Bush met at the Malta Summit. Bush offered to assist the Soviet economy by suspending the Jackson–Vanik amendment and repealing the Stevenson and Baird Amendments. There, they agreed to a joint press conference, the first time that a US and Soviet leader had done so. Gorbachev also urged Bush to normalize relations with Cuba and meet its president, Fidel Castro, although Bush refused to do so.

=== Nationality question and the Eastern Bloc ===
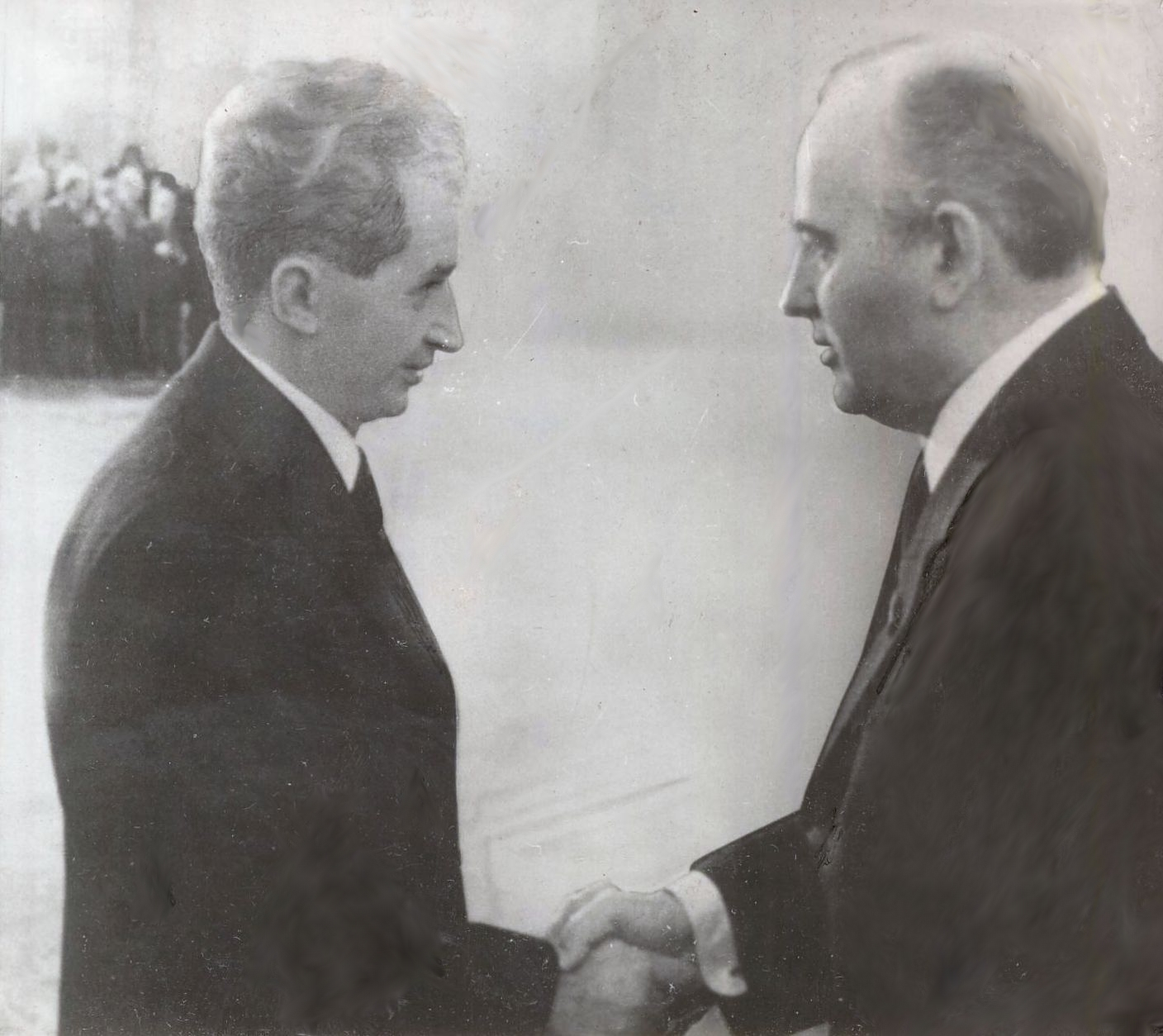
Gorbachev meeting the Romanian Marxist–Leninist leader Nicolae Ceaușescu in 1985. According to Taubman, Ceaușescu was Gorbachev's "favorite punching bag".

On taking power, Gorbachev found some unrest among different national groups within the Soviet Union. In December 1986, riots broke out in several Kazakh cities after a Russian was appointed head of the region. In 1987, Crimean Tatars protested in Moscow to demand resettlement in Crimea, the area from which they had been deported on Stalin's orders in 1944. Gorbachev ordered a commission, headed by Gromyko, to examine their situation. Gromyko's report opposed calls for assisting Tatar resettlement in Crimea. By 1988, the Soviet "nationality question" was increasingly pressing. In February, the administration of the Nagorno-Karabakh Autonomous Oblast officially requested that it be transferred from the Azerbaijan Soviet Socialist Republic to the Armenian Soviet Socialist Republic; the majority of the region's population were ethnically Armenian and wanted unification with other majority Armenian areas. As rival Armenian and Azerbaijani demonstrations took place in Nagorno-Karabakh, Gorbachev called an emergency meeting of the Politburo. Gorbachev promised greater autonomy for Nagorno-Karabakh but refused the transfer, fearing that it would set off similar ethnic tensions and demands throughout the Soviet Union. In the end however, greater autonomy was never given, and instead Gorbachev ordered the further violent ethnic cleansing of Armenians in parts of Nagorno-Karabakh and the adjacent Armenian-populated Shahumyan region, in what was named Operation Ring.

That month, in the Azerbaijani city of Sumgait, Azerbaijani gangs began killing members of the Armenian minority. Local troops tried to quell the unrest but were attacked by mobs. The Politburo ordered additional troops into the city, but in contrast to those like Ligachev who wanted a massive display of force, Gorbachev urged restraint. He believed that the situation could be resolved through a political solution, urging talks between the Armenian and Azerbaijani Communist Parties. Further anti-Armenian violence broke out in Baku in January 1990, followed by the Soviet Army killing about 150 Azeris. Problems also emerged in the Georgian Soviet Socialist Republic; in April 1989, Soviet troops crushed Georgian pro-independence demonstrations in Tbilisi, resulting in various deaths. Independence sentiment was also rising in the Baltic states; the Supreme Soviets of the Estonian, Lithuanian, and Latvian Soviet Socialist Republics declared their economic "autonomy" from the Soviet central government and introduced measures to restrict Russian immigration. In August 1989, protesters formed the Baltic Way, a human chain across the three countries to symbolize their wish to restore independence. That month, the Lithuanian Supreme Soviet ruled the 1940 Soviet annexation of their country to be illegal; in January 1990, Gorbachev visited the republic to encourage it to remain part of the Soviet Union.

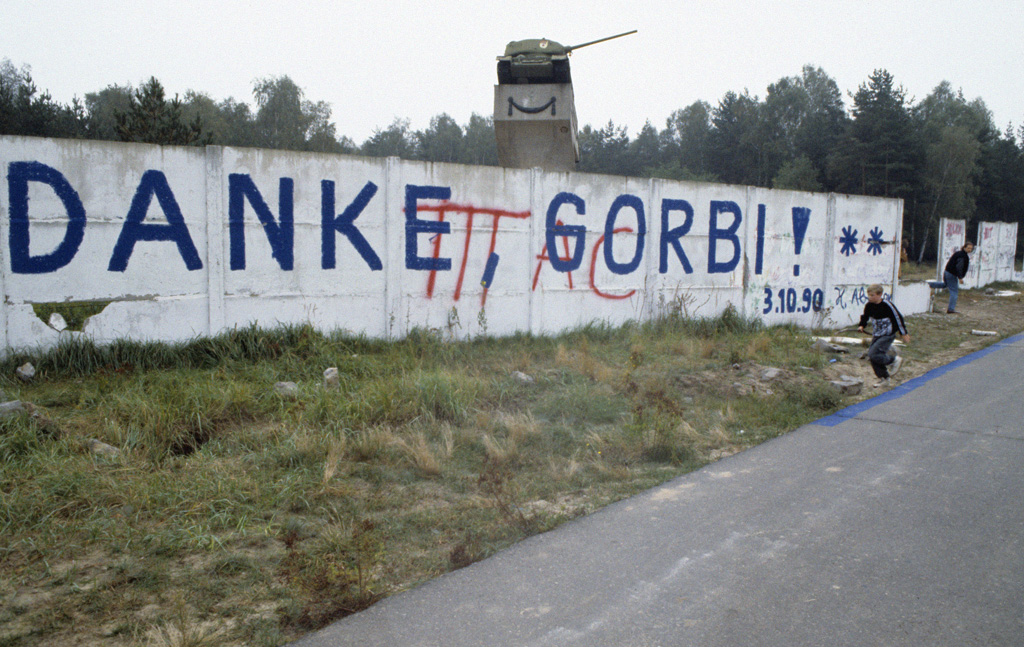
Berlin Wall, Thank you, Gorbi!, October 1990

Gorbachev rejected the Brezhnev Doctrine, the idea that the Soviet Union had the right to intervene militarily in other Marxist–Leninist countries if their governments were threatened. In December 1987 he announced the withdrawal of 500,000 Soviet troops from Central and Eastern Europe. While pursuing domestic reforms, he did not publicly support reformers elsewhere in the Eastern Bloc. Hoping instead to lead by example, he later related that he did not want to interfere in their internal affairs, but he may have feared that pushing reform in Central and Eastern Europe would have angered his own hardliners too much. Some Eastern Bloc leaders, like Hungary's János Kádár and Poland's Wojciech Jaruzelski, were sympathetic to reform; others, like Romania's Nicolae Ceaușescu, were hostile to it. In May 1987 Gorbachev visited Romania, where he was appalled by the state of the country, later telling the Politburo that there "human dignity has absolutely no value". He and Ceaușescu disliked each other, and argued over Gorbachev's reforms.

In August 1989, the Pan-European Picnic, which Otto von Habsburg planned as a test of Gorbachev, resulted in a large mass exodus of East German refugees. According to the "Sinatra Doctrine", the Soviet Union did not interfere and the media-informed Eastern European population realized that on the one hand their rulers were increasingly losing power and on the other hand the Iron Curtain was falling apart as a bracket for the Eastern Bloc.
