= Mikhail Zimyanin =

Belarusian Soviet partisan, politician, and diplomat

- Міхаіл Зімянін

Editor-in-chief of Pravda
- In office 21 July 1965 – 5 March 1976
- Preceded by: Aleksei Rumyantsev
- Succeeded by: Viktor Afanasyev

Ambassador of the Soviet Union to Czechoslovakia
- In office 20 February 1960 – 8 April 1965
- Preceded by: Ivan Grishin
- Succeeded by: Stepan Chervonenko

Ambassador of the Soviet Union to Vietnam
- In office 21 January 1956 – 3 January 1958
- Preceded by: Aleksandr Lavrischev
- Succeeded by: Leonid Sokolov

Member of the 25th, 26th, 27th Secretariat
- In office 5 March 1976 – 28 January 1987

Full member of the 23rd, 24th, 25th, 26th, 27th Central Committee
- In office 8 April 1966 – 25 April 1989

Personal details
- Born: 21 November 1914 Vitebsk, Russian Empire
- Died: 1 May 1995 (aged 80) Moscow, Russia
- Party: Communist Party of the Soviet Union (1939–1989)

Mikhail Vasilyevich Zimyanin (Note: Russian: Михаил Васильевич Зимянин Belarusian: Міхаіл Васільевіч Зімянін, romanized: Michail Vasiljevič Zimianin) (21 November 1914 – 1 May 1995) was a Belarusian Soviet partisan, politician, and diplomat who served as the editor-in-chief of the newspaper Pravda, the official publication of the Communist Party of the Soviet Union, from 1965 to 1976. Afterwards, he was appointed to the party's secretariat. He retired on 28 January 1987 for "health reasons".

== Early life and career ==
Mikhail Vasilyevich Zimyanin was born into a Belarusian working-class family in the city of Vitebsk on 21 November 1914. His first job was in a locomotive repair depot in 1929. He served in the Red Army from 1936 to 1938, and graduated from a teaching college in 1939. In 1940, he was appointed First Secretary of the Byelorussian Komsomol. Following the German occupation of Byelorussia, he stayed behind enemy lines as a member of the partisan movement.

== Post-World War II career ==
Following the end of World War II, Zimyanin quickly climbed the ranks of the Communist Party of Byelorussia, becoming Second Secretary of the BCP in February 1949. The First Secretary, Nikolai Patolichev, was a Russian, leaving Zimyanin, then aged 35, as the highest-ranking native official in Belarus. In 1952, he became a full member of the Central Committee of the Communist Party of the Soviet Union.

=== Khrushchev period ===
In 1953, soon after the death of Joseph Stalin, Zimyanin was suddenly removed from his position and transferred to the staff of the Ministry of Foreign Affairs. This was a fall in status, and resulted in his being dropped from the Central Committee after the 20th Party Congress in 1956.

It was all the more abrupt for the fact - not publicized at the time - that in June 1953 he was briefly elevated to the post of First Secretary of the BCP. This was part of a drive initiated in Moscow by the chief of police, Lavrentiy Beria, to promote native cadres in the non-Russian SSRs. According to one account, Zimyanin traveled to Minsk, and delivered a devastating report on Patolichev's record while Patolichev sat in silence, having already prepared to leave Belarus, when a message came through from Moscow to say that Beria had been arrested, and Patolichev reinstated.

For the next 11 years, while Nikita Khrushchev controlled the communist party of the Soviet Union, Zimyanin's career suffered from the suspicion that he had been too close to Beria. In September 1953, he was appointed head of the department of the Foreign Ministry that handled relations with Poland and Czechoslovakia. He was Ambassador in North Vietnam, January 1956-February 1958, head of the Far Eastern Department of the Soviet Ministry of Foreign Affairs, 1958–1960, and Soviet Ambassador in Czechoslovakia from February 1960 to April 1965.

=== Brezhnev period ===
On the day Khrushchev was ousted, and replaced by Leonid Brezhnev, their wives were on holiday together in Czechoslovakia. Meaning to speak to Viktoria Brezhneva, Zimyanin inadvertently rang Nina Khrushcheva and gloated about how he had attacked Khrushchev at the plenum of the Central Committee from which he had just returned, and how wonderful it was to have "dear Leonid Ilyich" as the new leader. He realized his mistake when there was no reply from Khrushcheva. That was how she learnt that her husband had been removed from office, because he had not been able to get through to her.

Zimyanin made a comeback in April 1965, as Deputy Minister for Foreign Affairs, and then in September 1976 as Editor of Pravda soon after BCP leader Kirill Mazurov, who had been Zimyanin's deputy and successor in the Byelorussian Komsomol in the 1940s, was transferred to Moscow and raised to full membership of the Politburo. His full membership of the Central Committee was restored in April 1966.

He took a harder line than his predecessor, who had warned against 'anti-intellectualism'. Speaking at a private meeting of Soviet journalists in September 1967, Zimyanin described the exiled Ukrainian writer Valery Tarsis as a madman, and Aleksandr Solzhenitsyn as "abnormal, a schizophrenic" with "a grudge against the regime", and attacked the poets Yevgeny Yevtushenko and Andrei Voznesensky.

In March 1976, he was appointed a Secretary of the Central Committee, with responsibility for culture, science, and the mass media. He retired in March 1987.
