= Secretariat of the 25th Congress of the Communist Party of the Soviet Union =

The Secretariat of the 25th Congress of the Communist Party of the Soviet Union (CPSU) was in session from 1976 to 1981.

== Members ==
Members of the Secretariat of the 25th Congress of the Communist Party of the Soviet Union
Name	Cyrillic	24th SEC	26th SEC	Birth	Death	PM	Ethnicity	Gender
Leonid Brezhnev	Леонид Брежнев	Old	Reelected	1906	1982	1931	Russian	Male
Konstantin Chernenko	Константин Черненко	New	Reelected	1911	1985	1931	Ukrainian	Male
Vladimir Dolgikh	Владимир Долгих	Old	Reelected	1924	2020	1942	Russian	Male
Mikhail Gorbachev	Михаил Горбачёв	By-election	Reelected	1931	2022	1952	Russian	Male
Ivan Kapitonov	Иван Капитонов	Old	Reelected	1915	2002	1939	Russian	Male
Konstantin Katushev	Константин Катушев	Old	Relieved	1927	2010	1952	Russian	Male
Andrei Kirilenko	Андрей Кириленко	Old	Reelected	1906	1990	1930	Ukrainian	Male
Fyodor Kulakov	Фёдор Кулаков	Old	Died	1918	1978	1940	Russian	Male
Boris Ponomarev	Борис Пономарёв	Old	Reelected	1905	1995	1919	Russian	Male
Konstantin Rusakov	Константин Русаков	By-election	Reelected	1909	1993	1943	Russian	Male
Yakov Ryabov	Яков Рябов	By-election	Relieved	1928	2018	1954	Russian	Male
Mikhail Suslov	Михаил Суслов	Old	Reelected	1902	1982	1921	Russian	Male
Dmitriy Ustinov	Дмитрий Устинов	Old	Relieved	1908	1984	1927	Russian	Male
Mikhail Zimyanin	Михаил Зимянин	New	Reelected	1914	1995	1939	Belarusian	Male
