= Vladimir Dolgikh =

Russian politician (1924–2020)

- Владимир Долгих
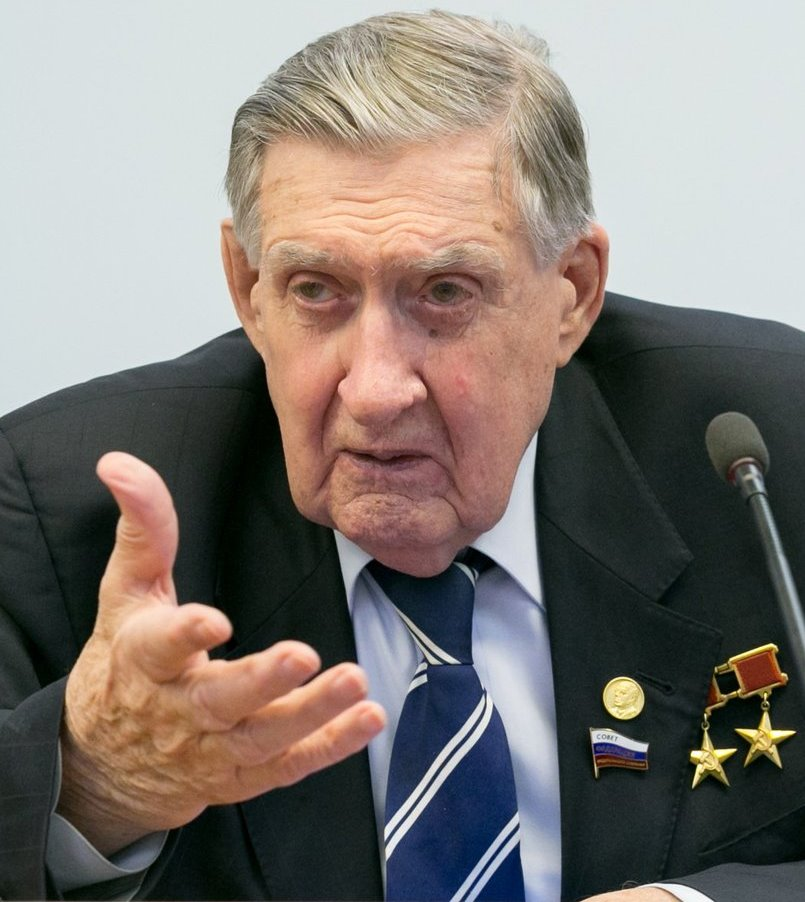
- Dolgikh in 2016

Russian Federation Senator from Moscow
- In office 13 September 2013 – 19 September 2018
- Preceded by: Yury Roslyak
- Succeeded by: Vladimir Kozhin

Candidate-member of the 26th, 27th Politburo
- In office 24 May 1982 – 30 September 1988

Head of the Metallurgical Department of the Central Committee
- In office 1976–1984

Member of the 24th, 25th, 26th, 27th Secretariat
- In office 18 December 1972 – 30 September 1988

Personal details
- Born: 5 December 1924 Ilansky, Yeniseysk Governorate, Soviet Union
- Died: 8 October 2020 (aged 95) Moscow, Russia
- Party: United Russia; Communist Party of the Soviet Union (1942–1988)
- Profession: Civil servant
- Awards: Hero of Socialist Labour (twice)

Vladimir Ivanovich Dolgikh (Russian: Владимир Иванович Долгих; 5 December 1924 – 8 October 2020) was a Russian politician who was head of the Metallurgical Department of the Central Committee Secretariat of the Communist Party of the Soviet Union. He was a candidate member (non-voting) of the Politburo from 1982 to 1988.

== Career ==
Dolgikh's early career involved various industrial and engineering management positions in Krasnoyarsk and Norilsk. In 1969, he became the First Secretary of the Krasnoyarsk Krai Committee of the CPSU. He was made a member of the CPSU Central Committee in 1971. In 1972, he became a Secretary of the Central Committee.

Dolgikh was elected as a candidate member of the Politburo in May 1982, at the same plenum of the Central Committee of the CPSU that made Yuri Andropov a secretary of the Communist Party of the Soviet Union. Dolgikh retired from all his CPSU leadership positions in September 1988.

Dolgikh received the Candidate of Sciences degree from the Irkutsk Mining-Metallurgical Institute.

He was awarded two Hero of Socialist Labour titles, six Orders of Lenin and many other awards.

In 2011, he became a State Duma deputy for United Russia. In September 2013, the mayor of Moscow, Sergey Sobyanin, appointed him as representative of the local government in the Federation Council.

Dolgikh died on 8 October 2020 in Moscow, aged 95.

== Honours and awards ==
- Hero of Socialist Labour, twice;
  - 4 December 1965 – for outstanding service in the performance of tasks to increase the production of nonferrous metals and achievement of high technical and economic indices of the Norilsk Mining and Metallurgical Works
  - 4 December 1984 – for outstanding achievements in office a candidate member of Politburo of the CPSU Central Committee and secretary, and in connection with his 60th birthday
- Order "For Merit to the Fatherland", 1st class (2014)
- Order "For Merit to the Fatherland", 4th class (28 December 2009) – for many years of fruitful activity for the social support of veterans and active participation in military-patriotic education of young people
- Order of Friendship (8 August 2005) – for many years of fruitful work for the social support of veterans and patriotic education of young people
- Six Orders of Lenin
- Order of the Patriotic War, 1st class, twice
- Honorary Citizen of Moscow (31 March 2010)
- Jubilee Medal "In Commemoration of the 100th Anniversary since the Birth of Vladimir Il'ich Lenin"
- Medal "For the Defence of Moscow"
- Medal "For the Victory over Germany in the Great Patriotic War 1941–1945"
- Jubilee Medal "Twenty Years of Victory in the Great Patriotic War 1941–1945"
- Jubilee Medal "Thirty Years of Victory in the Great Patriotic War 1941–1945"
- Jubilee Medal "Forty Years of Victory in the Great Patriotic War 1941–1945"
- Jubilee Medal "50 Years of Victory in the Great Patriotic War 1941–1945"
- Jubilee Medal "60 Years of Victory in the Great Patriotic War 1941–1945"
- Jubilee Medal "65 Years of Victory in the Great Patriotic War 1941–1945"
- Jubilee Medal "70 Years of Victory in the Great Patriotic War 1941–1945"
- Jubilee Medal "75 Years of Victory in the Great Patriotic War 1941–1945"
- Medal "In Commemoration of the 800th Anniversary of Moscow"
- Medal of Zhukov
- Medal "In Commemoration of the 850th Anniversary of Moscow"
- Order of Sukhbaatar (Mongolia)
- Order of Georgi Dimitrov (Bulgaria)
