= Boris Ponomarev =

Soviet politician and historian (1905-1995)

- Борис Пономарёв
- Ponomarev in 1963

Head of the International Department of the Central Committee
- In office 21 February 1957 – 25 February 1986
- Preceded by: Post established (himself as Department for Relations with Foreign Communist Parties head)
- Succeeded by: Anatoly Dobrynin

Head of the Department for Relations with Foreign Communist Parties of the Central Committee
- In office 9 December 1955 – 21 February 1957
- Preceded by: Mikhail Suslov
- Succeeded by: Post abolished (himself as International Department head and Yuri Andropov as Department for Relations with the Communist and Workers' Parties of the Socialist Countries head)

Candidate member of the 24th, 25th, 26th Politburo
- In office 19 May 1972 – 25 February 1986

Member of the 22nd, 23rd, 24th, 25th, 26th Secretariat
- In office 31 October 1961 – 25 February 1985

Personal details
- Born: 17 January 1905 Zaraysk, Ryazan Governorate, Russian Empire
- Died: 21 December 1995 (aged 90) Moscow, Russia
- Citizenship: Soviet
- Party: Communist Party of the Soviet Union (1919–1991)
- Profession: Politician, historian

Boris Nikolayevich Ponomarev (Russian: Бори́с Никола́евич Пономарёв; 17 January 1905 – 21 December 1995) was a Soviet politician, ideologist, historian and member of the Secretariat of the Communist Party of the Soviet Union. His patron in his rise to the Politburo was Mikhail Suslov.

His name would more accurately be transliterated as "Ponomaryov," though the form "Ponomarev" has become more frequent.

== Career ==
From 1955 to 1986, Ponomarev was chief of the International Department of the CPSU Central Committee. He occupied an office within Central Committee headquarters until the 1991 August coup, which he is said to have supported.

In 1962, Ponomarev wrote an updated state history of the CPSU to replace Stalin's 1938 History of the Communist Party of the Soviet Union (Bolsheviks) as part of the Khrushchev Thaw.

His December 1962 speech at the All-Union Conference of Historians was a major turning point in the development of Soviet historiography.

== Personal life ==
Boris Ponomarev is an uncle of a Russian-Ukrainian politician, writer and entrepreneur Ilya Ponomarev.

== Publications ==
- Plot against the Soviet Union and world peace (1938)
- Soviet Foreign Policy Vol. 1 1917–1945, edited with Anatoly Gromyko, Progress Publishers, 1980
- History of Soviet Foreign Policy 1945–1970, edited with Anatoly Gromyko, Progress Publishers, 1974
