= Sergei Zverev =

Soviet politician

- Сергей Зверев

USSR Defence Industry Minister
- Preceded by: Dmitry Ustinov
- Succeeded by: Pavel Finogenov

USSR Defence Industry Ministry State Committee Chairman
- Preceded by: Leonid Smirnov
- Succeeded by: Leonid Smirnov

Personal details
- Born: Sergei Alekseyevich Zverev; October 18, 1912 Sofronkovo, Demyansky District, Novgorod Governorate, Russian Empire
- Died: December 17, 1978 (aged 66) Moscow, Soviet Union
- Education: ITMO

Sergei Alekseyevich Zverev (Russian: Серге́й Алексе́евич Зве́рев, October 18, 1912 — December 17, 1978) was a Soviet politician who served as the Defence Industry Minister (from 1965 to 1978).

== Biography ==
Sergei Zverev started to work in 1930. In 1936 he graduated from LITMO.

From 1936 he took position of Engineer and started to take part in public activity. In 1939 he was elected Leading Political Consultant. From 1944 till 1947 he occupied positions of Leading Engineer and Assistant Director in Krasnogorsky Zavod.

From 1947 till 1958 he had occupied leading positions in USSR Military Industry Ministry and in USSR Defence Industry Ministry.

From 1958 till 1963 he occupied positions of co-chairman and USSR State Committee of Council of Defence Industry (GKOT) Ministers Primal Assistant Chairman. From 1963 till 1965 he was a chairman of USSR State Defence Industry Committee, and became a Defence Industry Minister in 1965.

A member of Communist Party of the Soviet Union. A member of the Central Committee of the Communist Party of the Soviet Union in 1966–1978. Supreme Soviet of the Soviet Union delegate. Buried in Novodevichy Cemetery, Moscow.

== Memory ==
The Krasnogorsky Zavod and Leningrad Military Technical School was named in honour of Sergei Zverev. In 2007 street in Krasnogorsk was given the name of Sergei Zverev.

Russian Optical Society established a medal in the honour of Sergei Zverev.

== Awards ==
Sergei Zverev was awarded Hero of Socialist Labour (1972); Order of Lenin (awarded six times); Order of the Red Banner of Labour (awarded two times); Order of the Patriotic War, 1st class; Order of the Red Star; Order of the Badge of Honour.

He was also awarded Lenin Prize in 1976 and USSR State Prize in 1971.
