= Secretariat of the 24th Congress of the Communist Party of the Soviet Union =

The 24th Secretariat of the Communist Party of the Soviet Union was elected by the 24th Central Committee in the aftermath of the 24th Congress.

== List of members ==
Name (birth–death)	Took office	Left office	Duration	Note
Leonid Brezhnev (1906–1982)	4 April 1971	5 March 1976	4 years, 336 days	Elected General Secretary at the 1st plenary session of the 25th Central Committee.
Pyotr Demichev (1918–2000)	4 April 1971	14 December 1974	3 years, 254 days	Resigned at the 8th plenary session of the 24th Central Committee.
Vladimir Dolgikh (1924–2020)	18 December 1972	5 March 1976	3 years, 78 days	Elected at the 4th plenary session of the 24th Central Committee.
Ivan Kapitonov (1915–2002)	4 April 1971	5 March 1976	4 years, 336 days	—
Konstantin Katushev (1927–2010)	4 April 1971	5 March 1976	4 years, 336 days	—
Andrei Kirilenko (1906–1990)	4 April 1971	5 March 1976	4 years, 336 days	—
Fyodor Kulakov (1918–1978)	4 April 1971	5 March 1976	4 years, 336 days	—
Boris Ponomarev (1905–1995)	4 April 1971	5 March 1976	4 years, 336 days	—
Mikhail Solomentsev (1913–2008)	4 April 1971	23 November 1971	4 years, 336 days	Resigned at the 2nd plenary session of the 24th Central Committee.
Mikhail Suslov (1902–1982)	4 April 1971	5 March 1976	4 years, 336 days	—
Dmitriy Ustinov (1908–1984)	4 April 1971	5 March 1976	4 years, 336 days	—
