= Secretariat of the 26th Congress of the Communist Party of the Soviet Union =

The Secretariat of the 26th Congress of the Communist Party of the Soviet Union (CPSU) was in session from 1981 to 1986.

== Officers ==
=== General Secretaries ===
General Secretaries of the 26th Congress of the Communist Party of the Soviet Union
Name	Cyrillic	Took office	Left office	Duration	Birth	Death	PM	Ethnicity	Portrait
Leonid Brezhnev	Леонид Брежнев	3 March 1981	10 November 1982	1 year and 252 days	1906	1982	1931	Russian	
Yuri Andropov	Юрий Андропов	12 November 1982	9 February 1984	1 year and 89 days	1914	1984	1939	Russian	
Konstantin Chernenko	Константин Черненко	13 February 1984	10 March 1985	1 year and 25 days	1911	1985	1931	Ukrainian	
Mikhail Gorbachev	Михаил Горбачёв	11 March 1985	6 March 1986	360 days	1931	2022	1952	Russian	

=== Second Secretaries ===
Second Secretaries of the 26th Congress of the Communist Party of the Soviet Union
Name	Cyrillic	Took office	Left office	Duration	Birth	Death	PM	Ethnicity	Portrait
Mikhail Suslov	Михаи́л Су́слов	3 March 1981	25 January 1982	328 days	1902	1982	1921	Russian	
Konstantin Chernenko	Константин Черненко	25 January 1982	24 May 1982	119 days	1911	1985	1931	Ukrainian	
Yuri Andropov	Юрий Андропов	24 May 1982	12 November 1982	172 days	1914	1984	1939	Russian	
Mikhail Gorbachev	Михаил Горбачёв	12 November 1982	11 March 1985	2 years and 119 days	1931	2022	1952	Russian	
Yegor Ligachyov	Егор Лигачёв	12 November 1982	6 March 1986	360 days	1920	2021	1944	Russian	

== Members ==
Members of the Secretariat of the 26th Congress of the Communist Party of the Soviet Union
Name	Cyrillic	25th SEC	27th SEC	Birth	Death	PM	Ethnicity	Gender
Yuri Andropov	Юрий Андропов	By-election	Died	1914	1984	1939	Russian	Male
Leonid Brezhnev	Леонид Брежнев	Old	Died	1906	1982	1931	Russian	Male
Konstantin Chernenko	Константин Черненко	Old	Died	1911	1985	1931	Ukrainian	Male
Vladimir Dolgikh	Владимир Долгих	Old	Reelected	1924	2020	1942	Russian	Male
Mikhail Gorbachev	Михаил Горбачёв	Old	Reelected	1931	2022	1952	Russian	Male
Ivan Kapitonov	Иван Капитонов	Old	Not	1915	2002	1939	Russian	Male
Andrei Kirilenko	Андре́й Кириле́нко	Old	Relieved	1906	1990	1930	Ukrainian	Male
Yegor Ligachyov	Егор Лигачёв	By-election	Reelected	1920	2021	1944	Russian	Male
Viktor Nikonov	Виктор Никонов	By-election	Reelected	1929	1993	1954	Russian	Male
Boris Ponomarev	Борис Пономарёв	Old	Not	1905	1995	1919	Russian	Male
Grigory Romanov	Григорий Романов	By-election	Relieved	1923	2008	1944	Russian	Male
Konstantin Rusakov	Константи́н Русако́в	Old	Relieved	1909	1993	1943	Russian	Male
Nikolai Ryzhkov	Николай Рыжков	By-election	Relieved	1929	2024	1956	Russian	Male
Mikhail Suslov	Михаил Суслов	Old	Died	1902	1982	1921	Russian	Male
Boris Yeltsin	Борис Ельцин	By-election	Relieved	1931	2007	1961	Russian	Male
Lev Zaykov	Лев Зайков	By-election	Reelected	1923	2002	1957	Russian	Male
Mikhail Zimyanin	Михаил Зимянин	Old	Reelected	1914	1995	1939	Belarusian	Male
