= Ivan Polyakov =

Russian military officer

Ivan Alexeyevich Polyakov (Russian: Ива́н Алексе́евич Поляко́в; 1886–1969) was a Cossack military leader who fought in World War I (on the Russian side), and in World War II (on the German side).

According to his file at the Hoover Institution website, he joined Pyotr Krasnov's Cossack army in 1917. He moved to Serbia in 1919.

In World War II he joined Andrey Vlasov's Russian Liberation Army (ROA), which fought on the side of Germany against the Soviet Union. He was Don Cossack Ataman (leader/chief) from 1947 to 1965. In 1952 he moved to the United States. He wrote two books.

In 1949 a letter of his was published in the journal Russia, describing the post-war fate of the Cossacks who had fought on the German side against the Soviet Union. He claimed that tens of thousands were killed by the Red Army after being violently repatriated by British troops.

== See also ==
- Repatriation of Cossacks after WWII
