= Fyodor Kulakov =

Soviet bureaucrat (1918–1978)

- Фёдор Кулаков
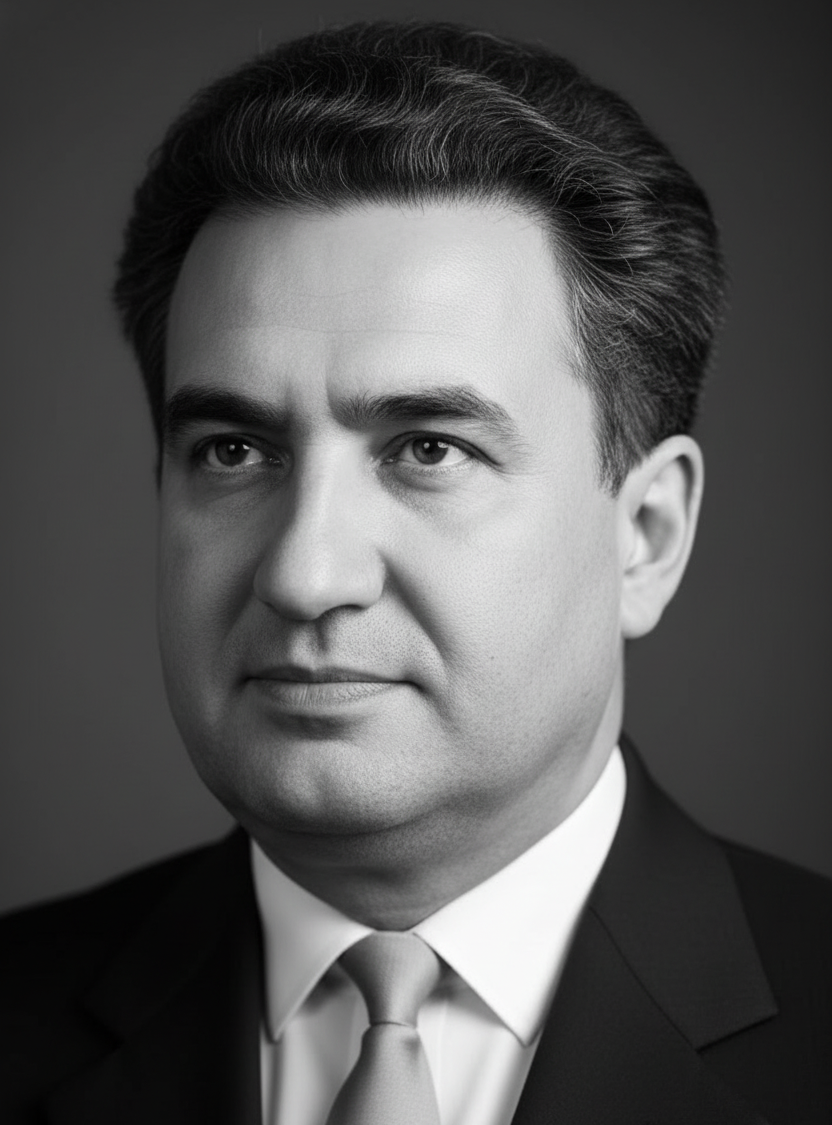

Head of the Agricultural Department of the Central Committee
- In office 16 November 1964 – May 1976
- Preceded by: Vasily Polyakov
- Succeeded by: Vladimir Korlov

First Secretary of the Stavropol Regional Committee of the Communist Party
- In office 25 June 1960 – 16 November 1964
- Preceded by: Nikolai Belyaev
- Succeeded by: Leonid Efremov

Full member of the 24th, 25th Politburo
- In office 9 April 1971 – 17 July 1978

Member of the 22nd, 23rd, 24th, 25th Secretariat
- In office 29 September 1965 – 17 July 1978

Personal details
- Born: 4 February 1918 near Penza, Soviet Russia
- Died: 17 July 1978 (aged 60) Moscow, Russian SFSR, Soviet Union
- Resting place: Kremlin Wall Necropolis, Moscow
- Party: Communist Party of the Soviet Union (1940–1978)
- Profession: Agronomist

Fyodor Davydovich Kulakov (Russian: Фёдор Давыдович Кулаков; 4 February 1918 – 17 July 1978) was a Soviet bureaucrat during the Cold War.

Kulakov served as Stavropol First Secretary from 1960 until 1964, immediately following Nikita Khrushchev's ouster. During his First Secretaryship in Stavropol, Kulakov met Mikhail Gorbachev; Kulakov became Gorbachev's mentor, and when he left his Stavropol First Secretaryship to enter national politics, Gorbachev took over his former office. Kulakov was elected to several important seats in the 1960s. In 1971, he was elected to the Politburo. He became a leading figure of Soviet leadership, and impressed Soviet leader Leonid Brezhnev to such an extent that Western commentators believed that Kulakov would become Brezhnev's successor. This did not happen since Kulakov died in 1978, four years before Brezhnev.

== Career ==
Kulakov was born in 1918 to a peasant family in Penza Oblast. Like his parents, Kulakov studied and graduated as an agronomist. In 1938, Kulakov started work in a sugar combine, and attended an Agricultural Institute, from which he graduated in 1941. In 1940, he became a member of the All-Union Communist Party (bolsheviks) and became a leading figure in the local Komsomol regional committee. Kulakov was later appointed to the position of Chairman of the Executive Committee of the Regional Party Committee of the Penza Oblast. In Penza, Kulakov became a close companion of future Soviet leader Konstantin Chernenko. He advanced through the Soviet hierarchy quickly and in 1955 he became Deputy Minister of Agriculture of the Russian Soviet Federative Socialist Republic (RSFSR), eventually being promoted to Minister of Grain Products. In 1960, he was appointed to First Secretary of the Stavropol Regional Party Committee. During his tenure as Stavropol First Secretary he appointed Mikhail Gorbachev to the provincial level of the party apparatus—a promotion which would prove to be crucial. In 1964, he left his office in Stavropol to pursue national politics; Gorbachev took over his former office as First Secretary. Throughout his tenure in Moscow, Kulakov remained a loyal client of Mikhail Suslov.

In 1964, Kulakov was brought to Moscow to become the Head of the Agricultural Department of the Central Committee. Eleven months later, Kulakov was appointed to the post of Central Committee Secretary for Agriculture. He was elected to the Central Committee in 1964, and to a seat in the Secretariat in September 1965. Gorbachev would often consult with Kulakov, as their closeness helped Gorbachev establish friendly relations with KGB chairman Yuri Andropov. At the 24th Party Congress, Kulakov became a Political Bureau (Politburo) member without serving a term as candidate member. It is believed that Kulakov greatly impressed Leonid Brezhnev due to his achievements in agriculture and politics. Three other young Politburo members, Volodymyr Shcherbytsky, Alexander Shelepin and Dmitry Polyansky, were all believed to have a future in the Council of Ministers, while First World commentators speculated that Kulakov's future was more in line with political and executive work at the top level of leadership. Kulakov was one of four who had a seat in both the Secretariat and Politburo; the others were Brezhnev, Suslov, and Andrei Kirilenko. In his later years, Kulakov had become one of Kirilenko's "counterweights" in the Central Committee.

While Brezhnev never had a clear heir apparent, Kulakov was seen as a likely successor due to his age. His most notable competitors, Kirilenko and Suslov, were older than Brezhnev and therefore not seen as likely candidates. Despite this widespread belief, in the prestige order voted by the Supreme Soviet in 1975, Kulakov was ranked seventh. During the latter part of his life, Kulakov's relations with Brezhnev, Chernenko, and other leading officials seemed to have shifted in tone, leading Kulakov to be excluded from the 1978 Central Committee plenum on Agriculture. It has been presumed that Kulakov had shifted his allegiance from Chernenko's faction to that of Kirilenko and Andropov. Another incident was that Kulakov had argued with Gorbachev before his death.

== Death ==
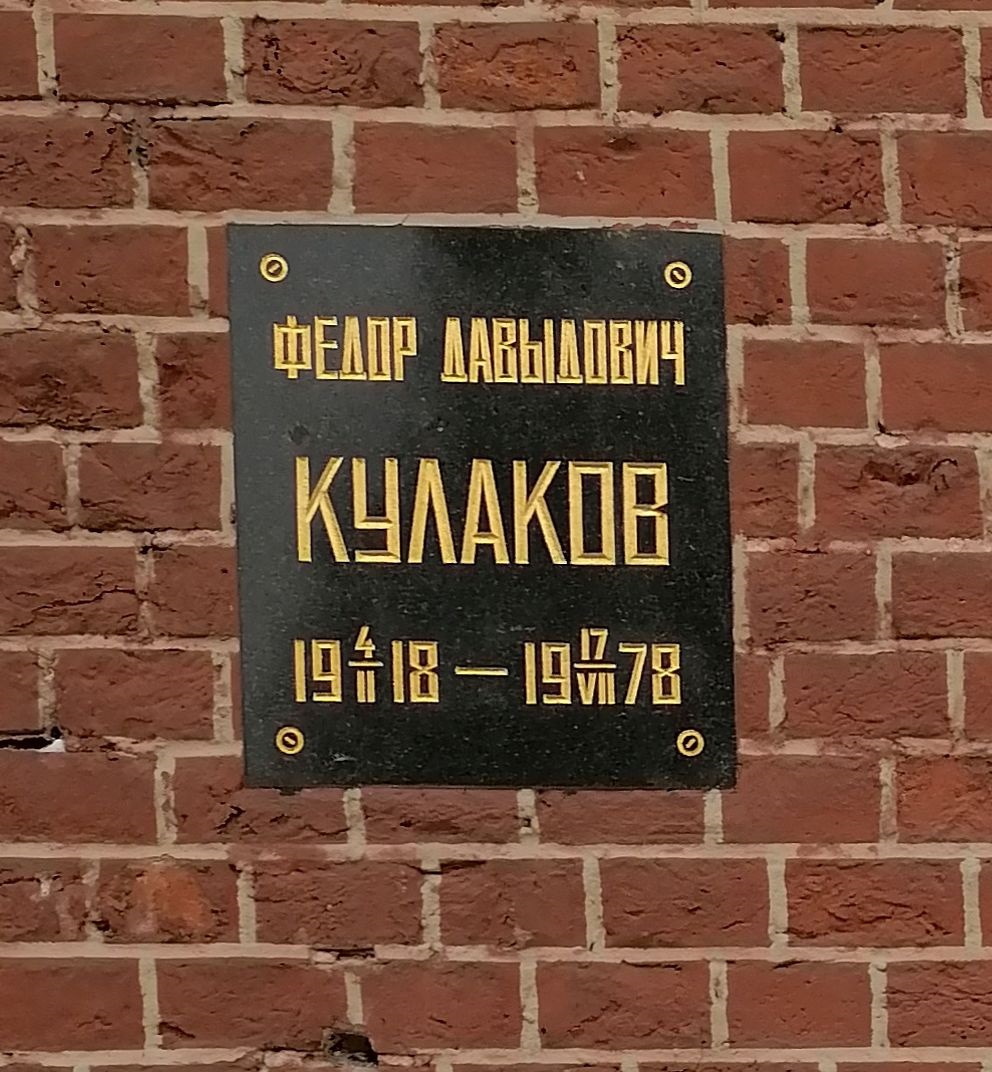
Kremlin Wall Necropolis - grave of Kulakov

The most commonly assumed cause of Kulakov's death is natural causes, but there exist other theories as well. During Brezhnev's later term, according to some, Brezhnev was living in fear of Yuri Andropov. Anonymous sources state that Andropov may have had been involved in the deaths of Kulakov in 1978, and Pyotr Masherov in 1980. According to Fyodor Morgun, a Soviet politician of Ukrainian descent, Kulakov seemed worried just days before his death. Some believe that Kulakov may have committed suicide. According to Mikhail Gorbachev, no members of the Politburo cancelled or interrupted their holidays when hearing the news of Kulakov's death. His successor to the office of Secretary for Agriculture was his former protégé, Gorbachev. Kulakov was cremated and his ashes was buried at the Kremlin Wall Necropolis. While all Politburo members were obliged by protocol to attend a fellow Politburo member's funeral, none of those who had allegiance to Chernenko and Brezhnev did so. Those who had sworn allegiance to Kirilenko and Andropov were present, including such prominent figures as Arvīds Pelše, Kirill Mazurov, Andrei Gromyko, and Dmitry Ustinov. Kirilenko served as the funeral's chief eulogist.

== Bibliography ==
- Hough, Jerry F. (1997). Democratization and revolution in the USSR, 1985–1991. Brookings Institution Press. ISBN 978-0-8157-3748-3.
- Law, David A. (1975). Russian Civilization. Ardent Media. ISBN 978-0-8422-0529-0.
