= First Lyashko government =

Government of Soviet Ukraine

The First Lyashko Government was created after the Ukrainian parliament had ousted the previous government of Volodymyr Shcherbytskyi on May 26, 1972.

In 1976 the government was reshuffled.

== Ministers ==
Office	Name of minister
Chairman	Oleksandr Lyashko
First Deputy Chairman	Nykyfor Kalchenko
Deputy Chairman	Hryhoriy Vashchenko
Deputy Chairman	Serhiy Andrianov
Deputy Chairman	Oleksandr Burmystrov
Deputy Chairman (DerzhPlan)	Petro Rozenko
Deputy Chairman	Volodymyr Semychasnyi
Deputy Chairman	Ihor Stepanenko
Deputy Chairman	Petro Tronko
Deputy Chairman	Hryhoriy Shevchuk
Minister of Heavy Industry Enterprises Construction	Hryhoriy Lubenets
Minister of Higher and Middle Special Education	Yuriy Dadenkov
Minister of Internal Affairs	Ivan Holovchenko
Minister of Coal Industry	Mykola Khudosovtsev
Minister of Geology	Petro Shpak
Minister of Power and Electrification	Oleksiy Makukhin
Minister of Harvesting	Ivan Stafiychuk
Minister of Foreign Affairs	Heorhiy Shevel
Minister of Communications	Heorhiy Sinchenko
Minister of Culture	Yuriy Yelchenko
Minister of Light Industry	Oleh Kasianenko
Minister of Forestry	Borys Lukyanov
Minister of Wood Processing Industry	Ivan Hrunyansky
Minister of Amelioration and Water Management	Mykola Harkusha
Minister of Montage and Special Construction	Heorhiy Bahratuni
Minister of Meat and Dairy Industry	Anatoliy Sennikov
Minister of Education	Oleksandr Marynych
Minister of Healthcare	Vasyl Bratus
Minister of Industrial Construction	Vasyl Areshkevych
Minister of Construction Materials Industry	Hryhoriy Baklanov
Minister of Rural Construction	Mykola Mykhailov
Minister of Agriculture	Petro Pohrebnyak
Minister of Trade	Volodymyr Starunsky
Minister of Finances	Anatoliy Baranovsky
Minister of Food Industry	Mykola Sanov
Minister of Ferrous Metallurgy	Yakiv Kulykov
Minister of Justice	Volodymyr Zaichuk
Minister of Radhosps	Trokhym Poplyovkin
Minister of Automobile Transportation	Fedir Holovchenko
Minister of Construction and Exploitation of Highways	Mykola Shulhin
Minister of Communal Management	Volodymyr Ploshchenko
Minister of Local Industry	Yuriy Hayevsky
Minister of Consumer Services	Lev Shpakovsky
Minister of Social Security	Oleksiy Fedorov

== Chairmen of committees ==
Office	Name of chair
Construction Affairs	Mykhailo Burka
Prices	Ivan Vinyukov
Vocational-Technical Education	Dmytro Ishchenko
Manpower Use	Oleksiy Denysenko
Television and Radio-broadcasting	Mykola Skachko
Publishing, Printing, and Book Production	Mykola Bilohurov
Cinematography (Derzhkino)	Vasyl Bolshak
Environmental Protection	Borys Voltovsky
Safe work condition in industry and mining supervision	Mykhailo Nyrtsev
Public Control	Andriy Malenkin
State Security	Vitaliy Fedorchuk
