= Pavlo Tychyna =

Ukrainian poet and politician (1891–1967)

- Павло Тичина
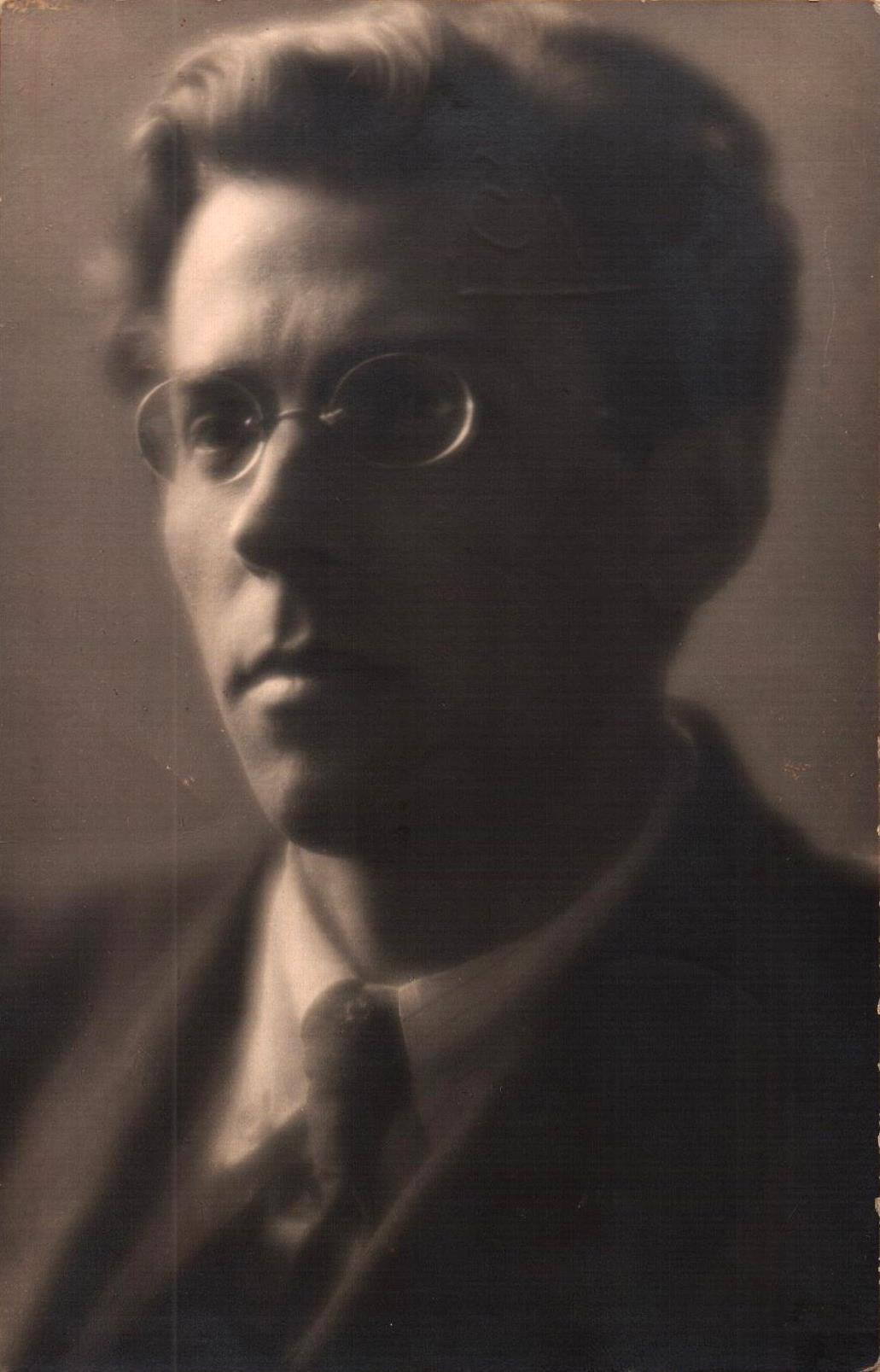
- Tychyna c. 1924

Chairman of the Supreme Soviet of the Ukrainian SSR
- In office 1953–1959
- President: Mykhailo Hrechukha; Demian Korotchenko
- Preceded by: Oleksandr Korniychuk
- Succeeded by: Oleksandr Korniychuk

Member of Supreme Soviet of the Ukrainian SSR
- In office 1938–1967

Minister of Education of Ukrainian SSR
- In office 1943–1948
- Prime Minister: Leonid Korniyets; Nikita Khrushchev; Demian Korotchenko
- Preceded by: Serhiy Bukhalo
- Succeeded by: Hryhoriy Pinchuk

Member of Supreme Soviet of the Soviet Union
- In office 1946–1962

Deputy Chairman of Supreme Soviet Soviet of Nationalities
- In office 1954–1962
- President: Vilis Lācis; Jānis Peive

Personal details
- Born: Pavlo Hryhorovych Tychyna; January 23, 1891 Pisky, Russian Empire (Now Pisky, Chernihiv Oblast, Ukraine)
- Died: 16 September 1967 (aged 76) Kiev, Ukrainian Soviet Socialist Republic, Soviet Union (Now Kyiv, Ukraine)
- Resting place: Baikove Cemetery, Kyiv
- Party: CPSU (1944–); CP(b)U (1952–1959, 1960–)
- Education: Kyiv Commercial Institute
- Occupation: Poet, academician, interpreter, publicist
- National Academy of Sciences of Ukraine: 1929–1967
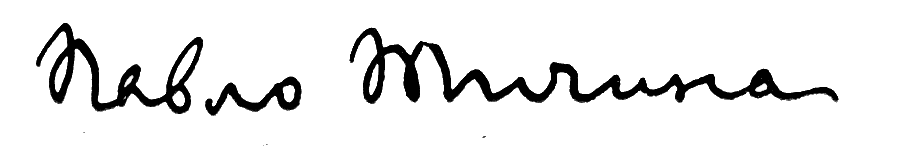
- Signature

Pavlo Hryhorovych Tychyna (Ukrainian: Павло Григорович Тичина; 23 January [O.S. 11 January] 1891 – September 16, 1967) was a major Ukrainian poet, translator, publicist, public activist, academician, and statesman. He composed the lyrics of the Anthem of the Ukrainian Soviet Socialist Republic.

== Life ==
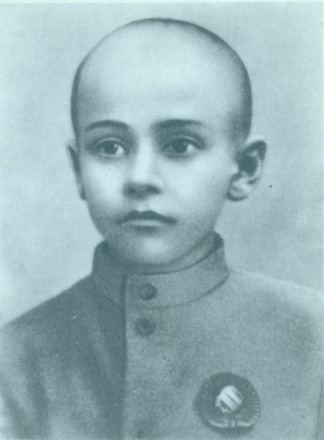
Tychyna in 1901

=== Early years ===
Born in Pisky in 1891, he was baptized on January 27, which was mistakenly considered his birth date until recently. His father, Hryhoriy Timofiyovych Tychynin, was a village deacon and a teacher in the local grammar school. His mother, Maria Vasylivna Tychynina (Savytska), was eleven years younger than Pavlo's father. Pavlo had nine siblings: five sisters and four brothers. At first young Tychyna studied at the district's elementary school which was opened in Pisky in 1897. His first teacher was Serafima Morachevska who later recommended him to try himself in a chorus. In 1900, he became a member of an archiary chorus in the Trinity (Troitsky) monastery near Chernihiv. Simultaneously young Tychyna studied in the Chernihiv theological school. Pavlo's father died in 1906. A year later, Pavlo finished his school.

In 1907–1913, Tychyna continued his education in the Chernihiv Theological Seminary, where he became friends with the future poet, Vasyl Ellan-Blakytny. He also met Mykhailo Kotsiubynsky, who greatly influenced his early works. In 1912-1913 Tychyna's works were published in various local publications. In 1913–1917, he studied at the Economics department of the Kyiv Commercial Institute, without graduating. At the same time, he was a member of the editorial boards of the Kyiv newspaper Rada and the magazine Svitlo (1913–14). During the summers, he worked for the Chernihiv statistical bureau, and later, as the chorus master's assistant at the Mykola Sadovsky theater.

=== Rise to fame ===
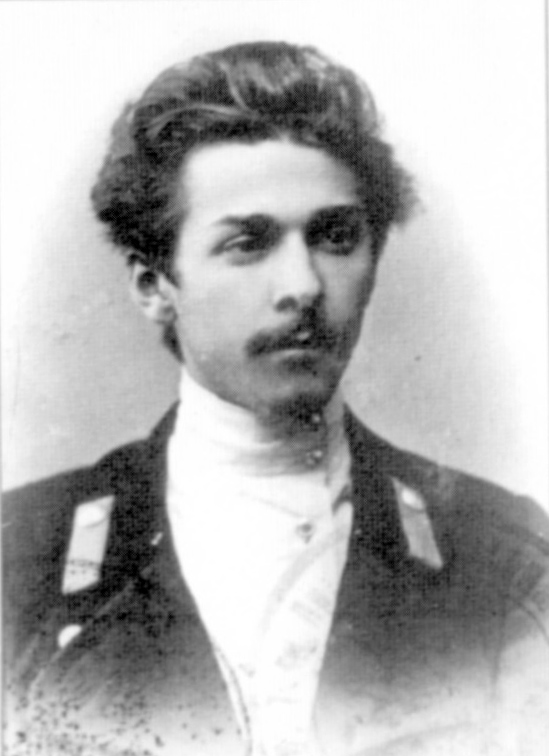
Tychyna in 1913

When World War I broke out, the Kyiv Commercial Institute transferred to Saratov. Tychyna, whilst on the way to the institute's new location, became ill and was forced to stop and recover from his sickness. He found sanctuary at the house of another poet, Volodymyr Samiylenko, in Dobrianka. During the war, he worked with various Ukrainian publications. In 1920, Pavlo published "Pluh", and after the immediate success with his poetry, moved to Kharkiv (Kharkov) in 1923, entering the vibrant world of early post-Revolution Ukrainian literary organizations. Then, he joined the literary organization Hart, and in 1927, the famed VAPLITE.

In the 1920s, Tychyna was a member of Kharkiv City Council as an independent politician. Controversy about the ideological tendencies of VAPLITE and the content of several of Tychyna's poems led to him being criticized for ideological reasons. As a response, Tychyna stopped writing, causing others to assume that was the end to his career. However, later he became a member of Chervonyi Shliakh, and started to study Armenian, Georgian, as well as Turkic languages, and became the activist of the Association of Eastern Studies in Kyiv.

=== Submission to Stalinism ===
In what is widely seen as a capitulation to the Soviet regime, in the early 1930s Tychyna adopted a socialist-realist line sanctioned by the Communist Party, submitting himself to Stalinism. Between 1936-1939 and 1941–1943, he served as the head of the Institute of Literature of the Ukrainian Academy of Sciences, and from 1938, was a deputy of the Supreme Soviet of the Ukrainian Soviet Socialist Republic. In 1941, the poet was awarded the Stalin Prize for literature for his apologetic works praising Joseph Stalin, the then-leader of the Soviet Union.

The Second World War gave a new impetus to Tychyna's poetry, and during that period he created a number of patriotic poems. During the period from 1943 till 1948, he served as the Minister of Education of the Ukrainian SSR, becoming a deputy of the Supreme Soviet of the USSR in 1946, and between 1953 and 1959, chaired the Supreme Soviet of the Ukrainian SSR. In the postwar period, Tychyna didn't take part in the Ukrainian cultural revival and attacked the Sixtiers.

=== Later years ===
During the last decade of his life, the poet continued to glorify the Communist Party, dedicating his poetry to collective farms, Heroes of Socialist Labour, Soviet leader Nikita Khrushchev etc. In the era of Leonid Breznev, Tychyna's creations were increasingly seen as examples of anachronism and self-parody. However, flashes of his former talent could still be observed in some of his poems written during and after WW2, including a number of posthumous publications.

== Work ==
Tychyna's initial work had strong connections to the symbolist literary movement, but his style transformed a number of times during his long career and frequently aped the acceptable socialist realism. His first poetry collection, Soniashni klarnety (Clarinets of the Sun, 1918) exploded onto the avant-garde Ukrainian scene with its colorful imagery and dynamic rhythms and introduced a uniquely Ukrainian form of symbolism, eponymously known as clarinetism. This line was continued in his following works issued during the early 1920s. However, as the Communist approach to artistic expression hardened and the role of a state-supported artist became more defined and restricted, Tychyna's poetry shifted rather dramatically, using clear pro-Communist political language, including the famous ode to Joseph Stalin, and the lyrics of the state anthem of the Ukrainian SSR. In 1933, the newspaper Pravda published his poem "The Party leads" in the Ukrainian language. Thus, Tychyna was often criticized by Ukrainian exiles for praising Communism in his work and co-option by the regime, but recent scholarship has stressed his subtle distancing himself from and mockery of Communist excesses and brutality through over-the-top suffusive praise.

== Controversy ==
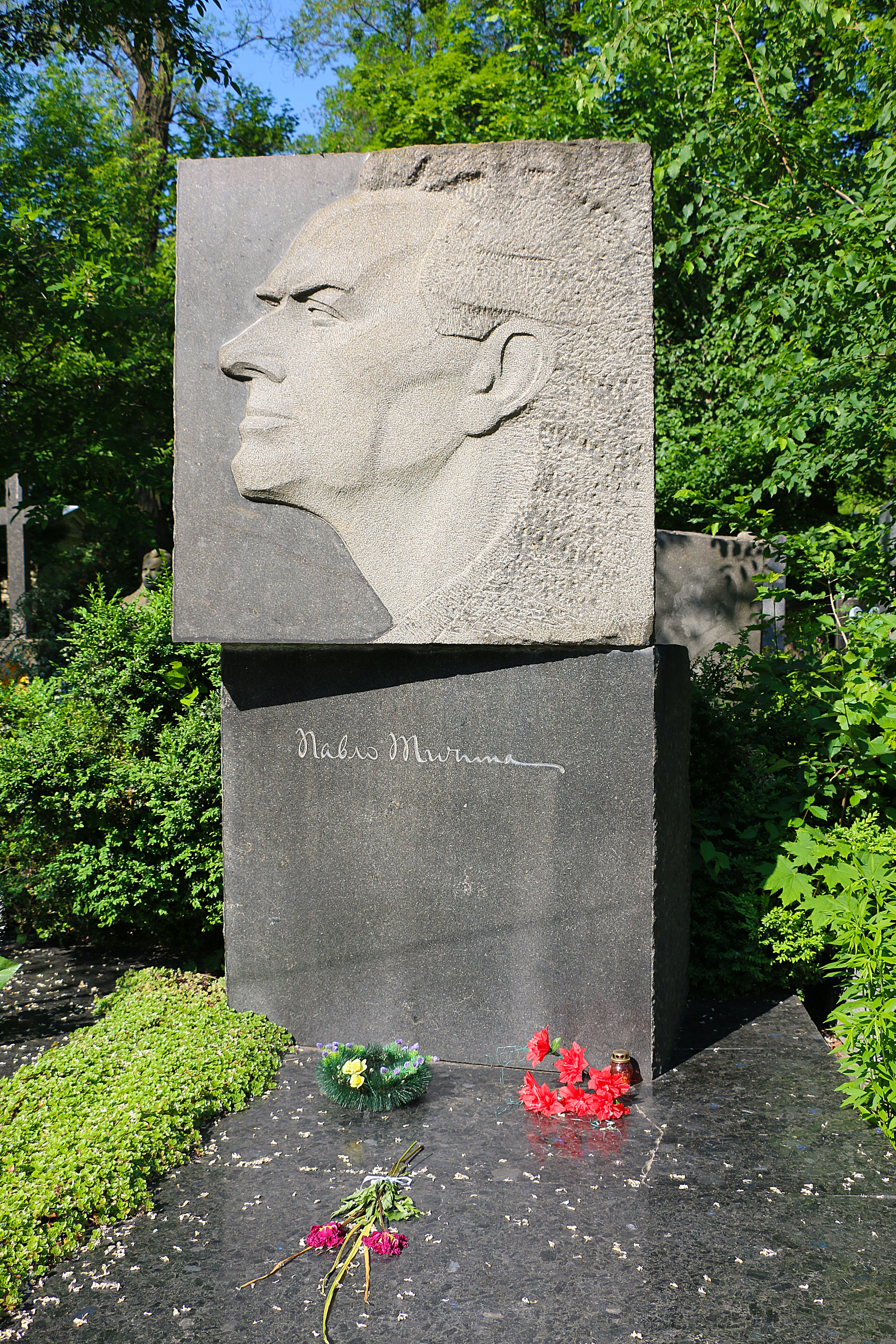
Tychyna's grave in Baikove Cemetery, Kyiv

Tychyna represents a complex figure. Many today, and in the past Ukrainian exile intellectuals and scholars involved in the analysis of the Ukrainian literary history, could not accept Tychyna's submission to political authority and apparent abandonment of many of his literary companions to the horrors of Stalinism, fundamental in assessment of his latter poetry.

Tychyna was nominated for the Nobel Prize in Literature in 1967 by Omeljan Pritsak, but died in September that year.

Tychyna's willingness to submissively work with the Soviet authorities did not prevent them from forcing him to write a letter rejecting his Nobel Prize candidacy, likely due to his Ukrainian heritage.

== Major works ==
- Clarinets of the Sun (1918)
- The Plow (1919)
- Instead of Sonnets and Octaves (1920)
- The Wind from Ukraine (1924)
- Chernihiv (1931)
- The Party is our Guide (1934)
- The Feeling of a Single Family (1938)
- Song of Youth (1938)
- Steel and Tenderness (1941)
- We Are Going into Battle (1941)
- Patriotism in The Works of Majit Gafuri (1942)
- A Friend's Funeral (1942)
- The Day Will Come (1943)
- To Grow and Act (1949)

== English translations ==
The poems of Pavlo Tychyna were translated into English by Stephen Komarnyckyj.

- Pavlo Tychyna. The Raspberry’s Eyelash. Translated and edited by Stephen Komarnyckyj. — Salzburg: Poetry Salzburg, 2012. 120 pp. ISBN 978-3-901993-36-7.
- Pavlo Tychyna. The Complete Early Poetry Collections. Translated by Michael M. Naydan. Glagoslav Publications, 2017. ISBN 978-1-911414-20-9.
- Print translations by Virlana Tkacz and Wanda Phipps
- Video of Tychyna's "War" read by Shona Tucker.

== Awards ==
- Stalin Prize in 1941 for the poetry collection "The Feeling of a Single Family" (“Чуття єдиної родини”)
- Shevchenko National Prize in 1962 (along with Oleksandr Honchar and Platon Maiboroda) for selected works in three volumes (1957)
- Hero of Socialist Labor on February 23, 1967, for literary and civic activity
- Order of the Red Banner of Labour (twice)
- Order of Lenin (five times)
- Gold medal "Hammer and Sickle"

== Legacy ==
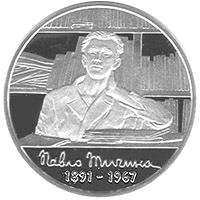
Ukrainian coin portraying Tychyna

Street names

In Ukraine: Kyiv, Chernihiv, Ivano-Frankivsk, Dnipro, Lviv, Kalush, Cherkasy, Uman and dozens others

Abroad: Yerevan, Armenia

Memorial plaques

- Kyiv, Ukraine (at 5 Tereshchenko Street, also opened a museum-apartment of Tychyna)
- Chernihiv, Ukraine (on the building of the former Theological Seminary)
- Kharkiv, Ukraine
- Ufa, Russia (at 79 Pushkin Street)

Monuments

- Pisky, Ukraine (bust)

Museums

- Pavlo Tychyna Museum in Kyiv, Ukraine

== In popular culture ==
The following pop songs were written on Tychyna's poems:

- "Veselo" by Kurs Valüt (2018)
- "Yak upav zhe vin z konya", "Hey vdarte v struny", "Des na dni moho sertsya" by Pyrih i Batih (2021)
- "Tam u topoli" by Artem Pyvovarov and Nastya Kamenskykh (2022)

== See also ==
- List of Ukrainian-language poets
- List of Ukrainian literature translated into English

Political offices
Preceded by Oleksandr Korniychuk	Chairman of the Verkhovna Rada; 1953–1959	Succeeded by Oleksandr Korniychuk
