= Anatoly Kuzmin =

Anatoly Kuzmin may refer to:

- Anatoly Kuzmin (politician, born 1859) (1859 – after 1912), deputy of the Third Imperial Duma
- Anatoly Kuzmin (politician, born 1903) (1903–1954), Soviet politician and metallurgist
- Anatoly Kuzmin (speedway rider) (1950–1978), Soviet speedway rider
