= All-Ukrainian environmental campaign =

All-Ukrainian Environmental Campaign was an action in the Ukrainian SSR conducted on the initiative of Narodniy Rukh (People's Movement) of Ukraine and the “Green World” Environmental Association from October 28 to November 3, 1989.

== Prerequisites ==
The disaster on Chernobyl Atomic Power Station on April 26, 1986, gave birth to a massive national-democratic movement which had a turning point in 1989. From the very beginning, the Communist Party's authorities resorted to silencing and falsifying the causes, scope, and consequences of the Chernobyl accident. It was necessary to communicate to the population of Ukraine and the world community the information about real threats, the elimination of which was impossible under conditions of the totalitarian regime.

The All-Ukrainian Environmental Campaign provided a certain impetus to the social and political processes in Ukraine, which culminated in the proclamation of state independence.

== Event ==
To make the campaign possible, the Regulations on the All-Ukrainian Environmental Campaign were approved by the Head of Narodniy Rukh Secretariat Mykhailo Horyn, and the Chairman of the “Green World” Environmental Association Yuriy Shcherbak. A copy of the Regulation was sent in advance to the Chairman of the Presidium of the Supreme Soviet of the Ukrainian Soviet Socialist Republic Valentina Shevchenko. Without waiting for a response, on October 28, the participants started the campaign as planned.

All-Ukrainian Environmental Campaign took place along the following route: Netishyn (Khmelnitsky Atomic Power Station) – Slavuta – Shepetivka – Zviahel – Korosten – Ovruch – Narodychi – Poliske – Ivankiv – Vyshgorod – Kyiv.

The purpose of the campaign was multifaceted. It was necessary to break the information blockade, distribute materials of patriotic publications with the Program and Charter of the Movement, information about political, environmental, linguistic situation in Ukraine, national symbols and more. It was planned to collect as many signatures as possible under the Appeal to M. Gorbachev, the President of the USSR, demanding to stop the atomic minelaying of Ukraine, and to solve the issue of the construction and operation of nuclear power plants independently through the referendums.

Participants of the campaign were members of public and political organizations of patriotic orientation (Narodniy Rukh, Taras Shevchenko Ukrainian Language Society, “Green World” Environmental Association and “Memorial” society). Most participants of the campaign were residents of Brovary and Brovary Region: Valeriy Sereda (chairman of the organizing committee), Ivan Odinets, Natalka Radchenko, Volodymyr Siroklin, Vasyl Stashenko, Anatoly Fedyk, Volodymyr Shvab (commander of the group), Vasyl Shust.

From the very beginning, the authorities interfered with the campaign, provoked actions against its participants along the route.

== Results ==
Participants of the All-Ukrainian Environmental Campaign in Moscow. December 16, 1989.

During the Campaign, the levels of radioactive contamination were determined, and explanatory work among the population was conducted (some of the participants of the Campaign were scientists – doctors and candidates of physical and mathematical sciences from the Institute of Nuclear Research). More than 500 thousand signatures were collected under the address to the President of the USSR M. Gorbachev.

The collection of signatures started all over Ukraine before the beginning of the campaign. For that purpose, the Secretariat of Narodniy Rukh had sent out the Letter of Appeal to all its Regional Organizations. Signatures were delivered to the Secretariat of Narodniy Rukh. The signatures were collected by December 16, 1989. The signed appeals were passed by the group of participants of the campaign in Moscow to the USSR People's Deputies Y. Shcherbak, V. Yavorivsky, M. Kutsenko who delivered them to the President of the USSR M. Gorbachev.

On November 25–26, 1989, the participants of the environmental campaign represented Ukraine in the work of the Peoples’ Assembly “Chornobyl Way” in Minsk, where they had to resolve the issues of interaction during the second stage of the Environmental Campaign with the delegates from Belarus and Lithuania, where the Campaign was also to be held. The Lithuanian representatives noted that they had chosen the path to restoring Lithuania's state independence, so they could not participate in the event. Immediately, at the proposal of the members of the Ecological Board of the Grand Council of Narodniy Rukh of Ukraine Yevgen Korbetsky, Volodymyr Confederatenko, Valeriy Sereda, a meeting of plenipotentiary representatives of the national fronts and movements of Belarus, Estonia, Lithuania, Moldova, Ukraine was held and the Protocol about the common actions was signed, which recommended that the peoples’ fronts and movements of these republics immediately direct all efforts to achieve state independence.

After the end of the campaign, the local cells of Narodniy Rukh, “Green World” Environmental Association, Taras Shevchenko Ukrainian Language Society were created in the cities along the route of the action.

== Information resonance ==
The campaign was highlighted in the following newspapers: New Life (Environmental Campaign) No. 169 of 21.10.89, Newsletter of Narodniy Rukh Secretariat “Bulletin of the Movement” (“Get into Environmental Campaign”) No. 1 of 10.89, “Working Word "(" On the route of Netishyn - Kiev ") No. 214-21 of 28.10.89, and (“Green World of Hope”) No. 225 of 15.11.89, “Molod Ukrayiny” (“Entrance… forbidden?”) No. 211 of 2.11.89, “Soviet Flag” (“Time of Joint Efforts”) No. 176—177 of 4.11.89, “Komsomol Star” (“We Want to Live!”) No. 137 of 14.11.89 etc.

The campaign was highlighted by the correspondents of radio “Svoboda”, “Voice of America”.

The campaign was described in the books by: Guziy V.M. “Golden cane” (1997), Dotsin I.V. “Chronicle Treasures” (2002), “Fight for independence of Ukraine in Brovary Region”, “Chronicle of Narodniy Rukh of Ukraine”, “Narodniy Rukh of Ukraine: A Place in History and Politics ”,“Kill the Dragon”.

== Video Chronicle ==
- A manifestation in Korosten during the All-Ukrainian Environmental Campaign of October 28 – November 3, 1989. Video - Volodymyr Tykhy, Valery Pavlov

== See also ==
- Human chain

== Sources and links ==
- Sereda V. Vony vystupaly proty atomnoyi vakxanaliyi (They opposed atomic bacchanalia) // Chas Ruhu. — 2009. — 27 October. — No. 19 (125). — С. 5.
- Olkhovsky I. Z hroniky NRU (From the chronicle of NRU) //Chornomorski novyny. — No. 018 (21386), Thursday 28 February 2013.
- Do 27-oyi richnyci Ukrayinskoyi Nezalezhnosti — Stanovlennya Nezalezhnosti u Brovarah (To the 27th Anniversary of Ukrainian Independence – Formation of Independence in Brovary)
