= Dnipropetrovsk Regional Committee of the Communist Party of Ukraine =

The Dnipropetrovsk Regional Committee of the Communist Party of Ukraine, commonly referred to as the Dnipropetrovsk CPU obkom, was the position of highest authority in the Dnipropetrovsk Oblast, in the Ukrainian SSR of the Soviet Union. The position was created on February 27, 1932, and abolished in August 1991. The First Secretary was a de facto appointed position usually by the Central Committee of the Communist Party of Ukraine or the First Secretary of the Republic.

== List of First Secretaries of the Communist Party of Dnipropetrovsk Region ==
Name	Term of office		Life years
Name	Start	End	Life years
First Secretaries of the Oblast Committee of the Communist Party
Vladimir Chernyavskiy	February 1932	October 1932	1893–1939
Vasyliy Stroganov	October 1932	January 1933	1888–1938
Mendel Khatayevich	January 1933	March 1937	1893–1939
Natan Margolin (Note: Acting to May 1937)	March 1937	November 1937	1895–1938
Demyan Korotchenko	November 1937	February 24, 1938	1894–1969
Semen Zadionchenko (Zayonchik) (Note: Acting to June 1938)	February 24, 1938	July 1941	1898–1972
Konstantin Grushevy (Note: Acting)	July 1941	October 1941	1906–1982
Nazi German occupation (1941–1943)
Georgiy Dementyev	1943	February 1944	
Pavel Naydenov	February 1944	November 1947	1905–1967
Leonid Brezhnev	November 27, 1947	June 1950	1906–1982
Andrei Kirilenko	June 1950	December 1955	1906–1990
Vladimir Shcherbitskiy	December 1955	December 1957	1918–1990
Anton Gayevoi	December 1957	May 1961	1907–1962
Nikita Tolubeyev (Note: For Industry from January 1963)	May 1961	July 7, 1963	1922–
Aleksei Vatchenko (Note: For Agriculture)	January 1963	December 1964	1914–1984
Vladimir Shcherbitskiy (Note: For Industry to December 1964)	July 7, 1963	October 1965	1918–1990
Aleksei Vatchenko	October 1965	June 1976	1914–1984
Yevgeniy Kachalovskiy	June 1976	1983	1926–2011
Viktor Boyko	1983	April 20, 1987	1931–
Vladimir Ivashko	April 20, 1987	December 14, 1988	1932–1994
Nikolai Zadoya	December 14, 1988	August 31, 1990	1938–
Nikolai Omelchenko	August 31, 1990	August 1991	1936–

== See also ==
- Dnipropetrovsk Oblast

== Sources ==
- World Statesmen.org
