= Serafim Kolpakov =

Soviet politician (1933–2011)

Minister of Metallurgy
- In office 5 July 1985 – 10 April 1991
- Premier: Nikolay Ryzhkov; Valentin Pavlov
- Preceded by: Ivan Kazanets
- Succeeded by: Oleg Soskovets

Personal details
- Born: Serafim Vasilyevich Kolpakov; 10 January 1933 Lipetsk, Soviet Union
- Died: 15 November 2011 (aged 78)
- Resting place: Troyekurovskoye cemetery, Moscow
- Party: Communist Party
- Education: Lipetsk Mining and Metallurgical College; Moscow Institute of Steel and Alloys

Serafim Kolpakov (Russian: Серафим Колпаков; 10 January 1933 – 15 November 2011) was a Soviet engineer who served as minister of metallurgy in the 1980s. He was a member of the central committee of the Soviet Communist Party.

== Biography ==
Kolpakov was born in Lipetsk, Lipetsk Oblast, on 10 January 1933. He graduated from the Lipetsk Mining and Metallurgical College and the Moscow Institute of Steel and Alloys obtaining a bachelor's degree in metallurgical engineer. He also received his PhD in technical sciences.

Following his graduation he worked at the Ashinsky Metallurgical Plant in the Chelyabinsk Oblast, at the Lipetsk Tractor Plant, and then at the Novolipetsk Metallurgical Plant. In the periods 1978-1979 and 1982-1985 Kolpakov served as deputy minister of ferrous metallurgy. In July 1985 he was appointed minister of ferrous metallurgy replacing Ivan Kazanets in the post. Kolpakov's tenure continued until 1989, and in the period 1989-1990 he was the minister of metallurgy. He also served at the central committee of the Communist Party.

In 1992 Kolpakov was elected president of the International Union of Metallurgists and became a member of the steering committee of a non-profit company, Russian Steel Consortium, in 2001.

Kolpakov died of heart attack on 15 November 2011. A funeral ceremony took place on 18 November, and he was buried at the Troyekurovskoye cemetery in Moscow.
