= Ivan Hrushetsky =

Ukrainian and Soviet politician

- Іван Грушецький
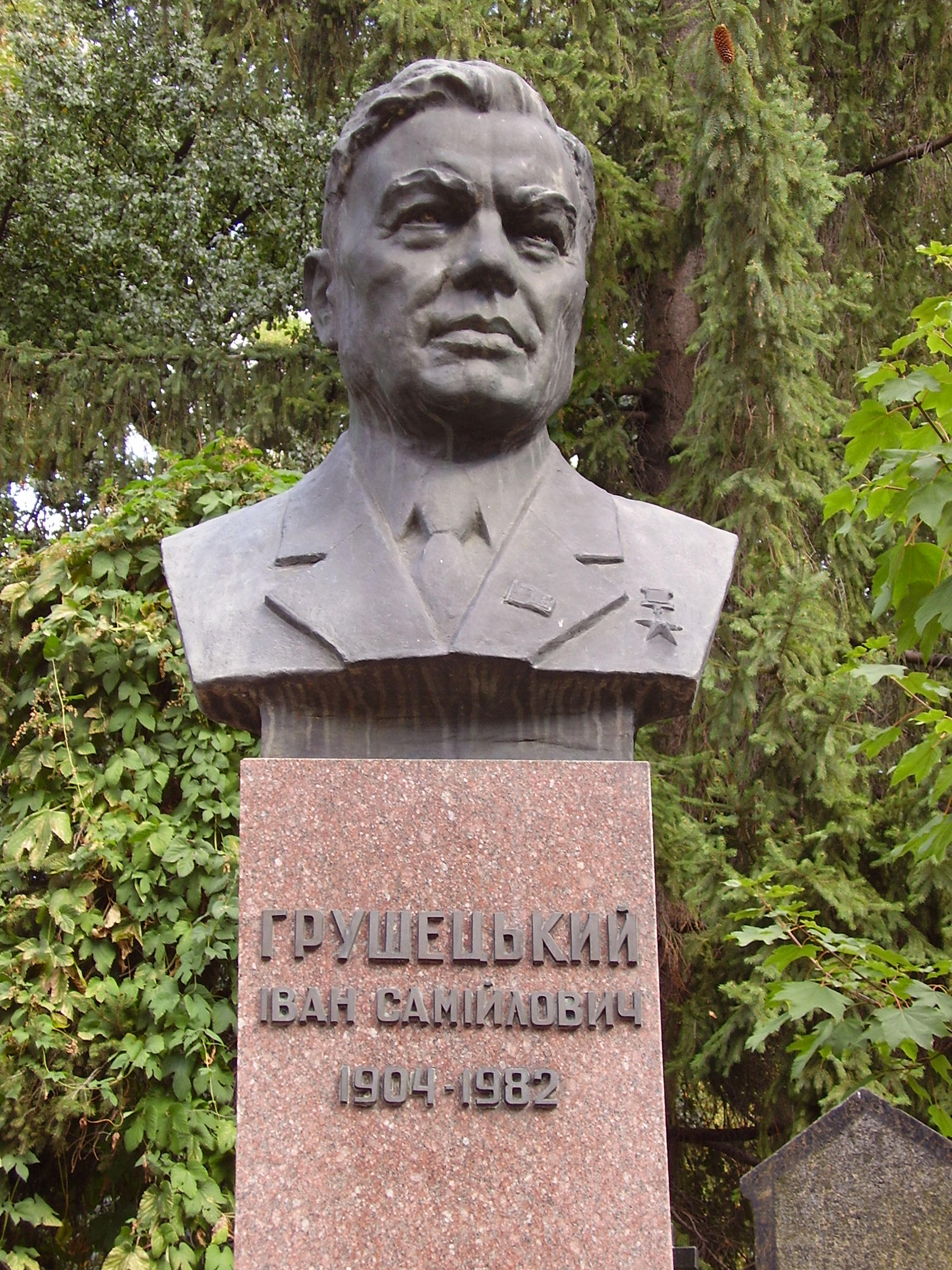
- Tombstone of Hrushetsky, Kyiv, Ukraine

1st Secretary of Chernivtsi Regional Committee of CP(b)U
- In office 1940–1941
- Preceded by: Office established
- Succeeded by: Office disestablished (Romanian occupation)

1st Secretary of Lviv Regional Committee of CP(b)U
- In office 1944 – December 1948
- Preceded by: Office established
- Succeeded by: Borys Koval
- In office January 1950 – February 1951
- Preceded by: Borys Koval
- Succeeded by: Vasyl Chuchukalo
- In office 11 February 1961 – December 1962
- Preceded by: Mykhailo Lazurenko
- Succeeded by: Vasyl Kutsevol

1st Secretary of Volyn Regional Committee of CP(b)U
- In office 1951 – February 1961
- Preceded by: Illia Profatilov
- Succeeded by: Fedir Kalita

Chairman of Presidium of the Supreme Council of the Ukrainian SSR
- In office 28 July 1972 – 24 June 1976
- Preceded by: Oleksandr Lyashko
- Succeeded by: Oleksiy Vatchenko

Personal details
- Born: 22 August 1904 Komyshuvakha, Melitopolsky Uyezd, Taurida Governorate, Russian Empire
- Died: 26 November 1982 (aged 78) Kiev, Ukrainian SSR, Soviet Union
- Party: All-Union Communist Party (bolsheviks)

Ivan Samiylovych Hrushetsky (Ukrainian: Іван Самійлович Грушецький; 22 August 1904 – 28 November 1982) was a Soviet Ukrainian politician, who served as the chairman of Presidium of the Supreme Council of the Ukrainian Soviet Socialist Republic from 1972 to 1976.

== Biography ==
Ivan Hrushetsky was born on 22 (O.S. 9) August 1904 in the village of Komyshuvakha that today is located in Orikhiv Raion, Zaporizhzhia Oblast. his father was a poor farmer. At the age of 18, Hrushetsky entered the Komsomol and became the head of a poor peasants' committee in the village of Dudnykove, later heading the village council. In 1928, he became a member of the Communist Party and in the following years worked in local party committees of Dnipropetrovsk Oblast.

In 1937, Hrushetsky was appointed secretary of the Presidium of Dnipropetrovsk Oblast Council and became a third secretary of the regional party committee. Following the Molotov-Ribbentrop Pact, he was appointed deputy secretary of the party committee in Stanislav Oblast, and in 1940, took the post of the First Secretary of the Communist Party in Chernivtsi Oblast. Despite lacking any military experience, during the German-Soviet War, Hrushetsky served as a member of the military council of the Soviet 40th Army and as the unit's brigade commissar. In 1943, Hrushetsky was promoted to major general and became a member of the military council of the Steppe Front, and, later, the 2nd Ukrainian Front.

Following the westward advance of Soviet forces, in April 1944, Hrushetsky was appointed First Secretary of the Lviv Regional Committee of the Communist Party. His activities on the post included the restoration of collective farms, moilization of locals to the Soviet Army and working squads, and promotion of voluntary loans to state authorities. In 1962, Hrushetsky was promoted to the post of a secretary of the Communist Party of Ukraine and deputy head of the Council of Ministers of the Ukrainian SSR and headed the State Control Committee. In 1966, he became head of the Party Commission of the Central Committee of the Communist Party of Ukraine.

In 1972, Hrushetsky was once again promoted, taking the post of head of presidium of the Supreme Council of the Ukrainian SSR. In 1974, he was awarded with the order of Hero of Socialist Labour. Hrushetsky retired two years later and lived the rest of his life as a personal pensioner. He died on 26 November 1982.

== Personality ==
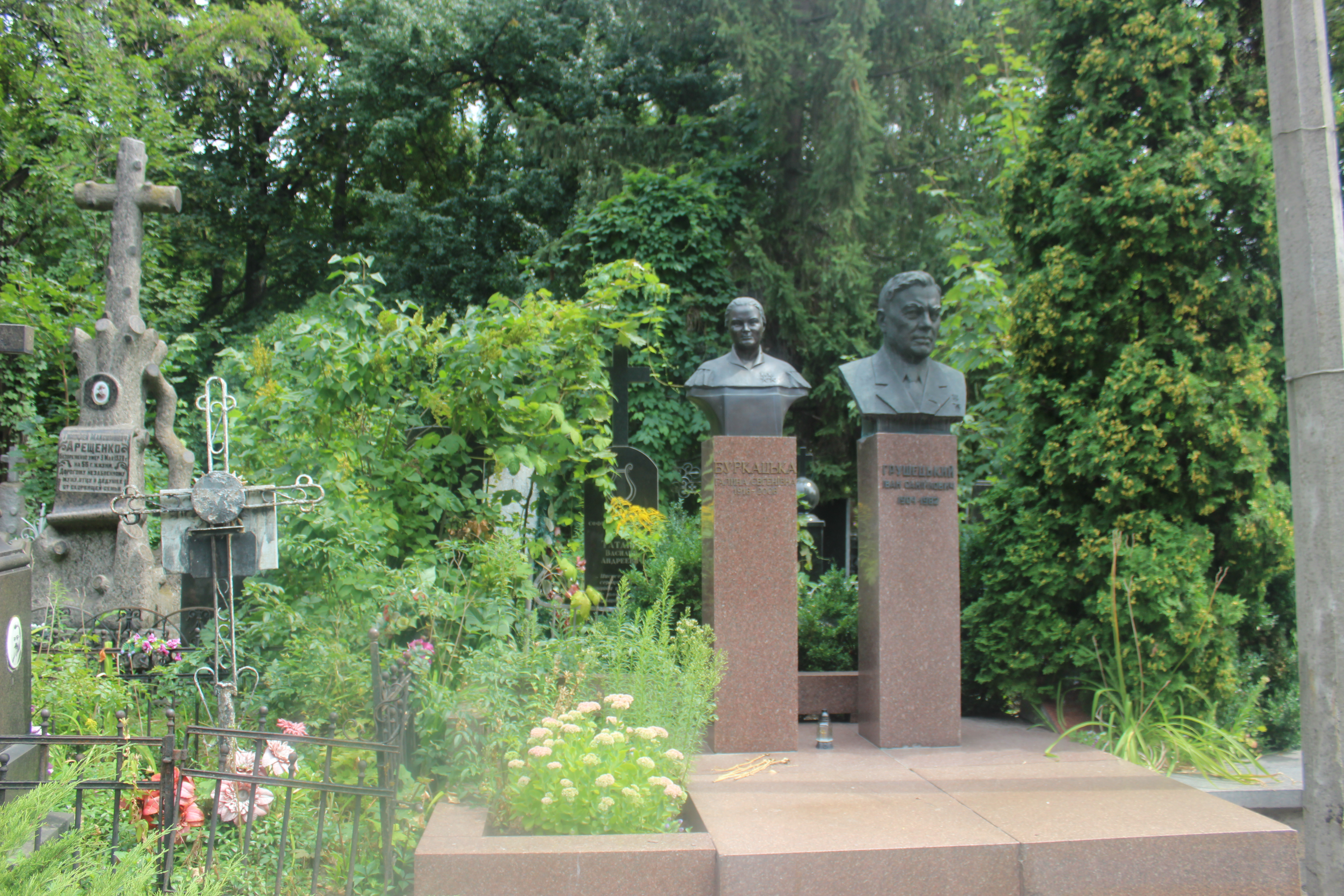
Hrushetsky's tomb (right) on the Baikove Cemetery in Kyiv

Hrushetsky's subordinates criticized him for rudeness and corruption, sending complaints to his superiors including Nikita Khrushchev and Andrei Zhdanov. Among others, as head of the Lviv party committee he and his colleagues in the organ engaged in mass purchase of furniture, part of which was sold for millions of Soviet rubles, and repaired their own privately bought cars at the expense of the state budget. Hrushetsky was also criticized for his lack of education - he finished the Higher Party School only in 1957.

Petro Shelest, under whose leadership Hrushetsky worked in the Central Committee of the Communist Party of Ukraine, left a negative evaluation of his subordinate's personal qualities in his memoirs, describing him as "dumb", "sycophant", "inhumane" and "careerist". Ukrainian writer Oles Honchar compared Hrushetsky and several other high-ranked Soviet politicians to fascists.

Political offices
Preceded by Oleksandr Lyashko	Chairman of the Presidium of the Supreme Soviet of the Ukrainian SSR; 1972-1976	Succeeded by Oleksiy Vatchenko
