= Council of Ministers, Ukraine =

The Ukraine Council of Ministers may refer to:

- Council of Ministers of the Ukrainian SSR, highest executive and administrative body of the Ukrainian Soviet Socialist Republic
- Council of Ministers (Ukrainian State) or Cabinet of Ministers of Ukraine, commonly referred to as the Government of Ukraine
