= Presidium of the Supreme Soviet of the Ukrainian Soviet Socialist Republic =

The Presidium of the Supreme Soviet of the Ukrainian Soviet Socialist Republic (Ukrainian: Президія Верховної Ради УРСР, romanized: Prezydiia Verkhovnoi Rady URSR), referred to between 1991 and 1996 as the Presidium of the Verkhovna Rada of Ukraine (Ukrainian: Президія Верховної Ради України, romanized: Prezydiia Verkhovnoi Rady Ukrainy) was the permanent organ of the Supreme Soviet of the Ukrainian SSR then of the Verkhovna Rada, accountable to the Supreme Soviet in its activity, and, within the nominal limits prescribed by the Constitution of the Ukrainian SSR, performed functions of the highest state power in the Ukrainian SSR. It was first established by the constitution in 1937 to replace the Central Executive Committee of Ukraine. Its membership was elected for the first time on December 27, 1938, at the first session of the Supreme Soviet of the Ukrainian SSR. The presidium later became the permanent body of the post-Soviet legislature of Ukraine, the Verkhovna Rada, but was dissolved upon the adoption of the Constitution of Ukraine on June 28, 1996.

== Background ==
According to the Constitution of the Ukrainian SSR, the presidium was elected by the Supreme Soviet from among the people's deputies, at the first session of each following convocation for the entire term of the Supreme Soviet; however, when a new convocation of the Supreme Soviet was elected, the outgoing presidium retained its powers until a new presidium was elected. The presidium was competent to issue ukazes and resolutions and possessed the right of legislative initiative in the Supreme Soviet, and was, in effect, the Ukrainian SSR's collective head of state. The constitution also required more detailed provisions regarding the legal status, competence, order of formation, and activity of the presidium to be defined by the standing orders of the Supreme Soviet.

After 1991, the powers of the presidium were narrowed. Some of the powers were delegated to the newly created post of the President of Ukraine, while others were transferred to the Verkhovna Rada. With the adoption of the post-Soviet constitution in 1996, the presidium was dissolved, though the term is still collectively applied to the chairman, deputy chairmen and occasionally also to the parliamentary faction leaders of the Verkhovna Rada.

== Composition ==
The presidium was initially composed of a chairman, two vice chairmen, a secretary, and fifteen ordinary members. Following the adoption of the 1978 Constitution of the Ukrainian SSR, the number of vice chairmen was increased to three and the number of ordinary members became twenty.

== Powers ==
At the adoption of the 1978 Constitution of the Ukrainian SSR, the presidium had the powers to:

- Call elections for the Supreme Soviet and local soviets and elections of district and city courts
- Convene sessions of the Supreme Soviet
- Coordinate the activities of the Supreme Soviet's permanent commissions
- Exercise control over the activities of local councils (soviets)
- Monitor observance of the constitution
- Interpret republican laws
- Override decisions and regulations of the Council of Ministers of the Ukrainian SSR and of local soviets in case of their inconsistency with the law
- Resolve issues concerning the administrative-territorial system
- Establish and change borders of regions and their raions (districts)
- Establish and award honorary titles of the Ukrainian SSR, including an honorary diploma and a Diploma of the Presidium
- Grant citizenship of the Ukrainian SSR
- Solve issues concerning of granting asylum, including issuing acts of amnesty and granting pardons to citizens convicted by courts of the Ukrainian SSR
- Ratify and denounce international treaties of the Ukrainian SSR
- Appoint and recall diplomatic representatives of the Ukrainian SSR in foreign countries and international organizations
- Receive letters of credence and recall of diplomatic representatives of foreign countries accredited to it
- If necessary, between sessions of the Supreme Soviet, Amend the laws of the Ukrainian SSR, subject to subsequent approval by the Supreme Soviet
- Create and liquidate ministries and state committees on the proposal of the Council of Ministers of the Ukrainian SSR
- Appoint and dismiss ministers and state commissioners on the proposal of the Chairman of the Council of Ministers

== List of chairpersons ==
=== Chairpersons of the Presidium (distinct office) ===
- July 27, 1938 - July 28, 1939 -- Leonid Korniyets
- July 28, 1939 - January 15, 1954 -- Mykhailo Hrechukha
- January 15, 1954 - April 7, 1969 -- Demyan Korotchenko
- June 19, 1969 - June 9, 1972 -- Oleksandr Liashko
- July 28, 1972 - June 24, 1976 -- Ivan Hrushetsky
- June 24, 1976 - November 22, 1984 -- Oleksiy Vatchenko
- March 27, 1985 - May 15, 1990 -- Valentyna Shevchenko
- June 4, 1990 - July 9, 1990 -- Volodymyr Ivashko
- July 23, 1990 - October 23, 1990 -- Leonid Kravchuk

=== Chairpersons of the Presidium (ex officio as Chairman of the Verkhovna Rada) ===
- October 23, 1990 - December 5, 1991 -- Leonid Kravchuk
- December 5, 1991 - May 11, 1994 -- Ivan Plyushch
- May 11, 1994 - June 28, 1996 -- Oleksandr Moroz

== See also ==
- Presidium of the Supreme Soviet
- Chairman of the Verkhovna Rada
