= Kurs Valüt =

Ukrainian electronic music group

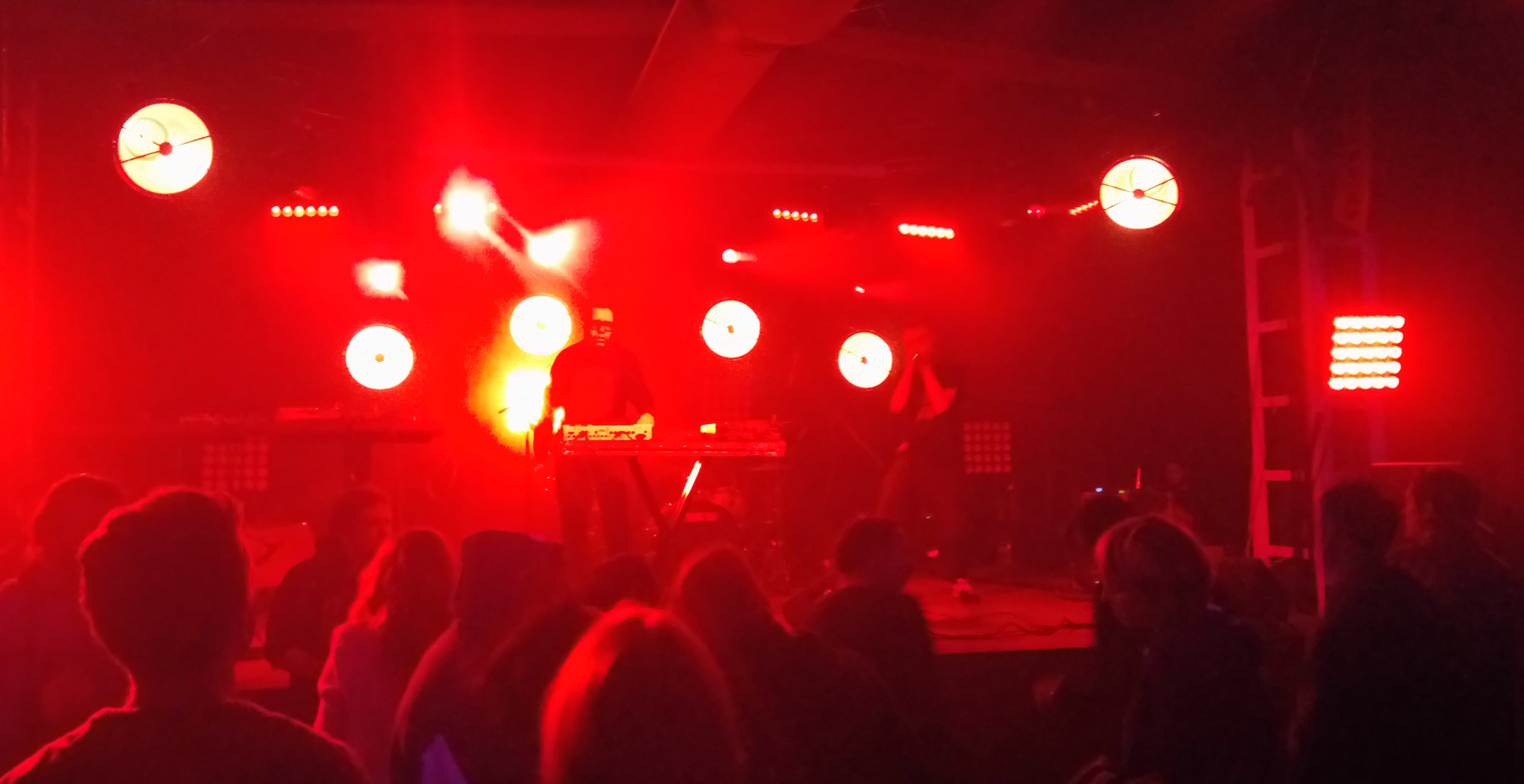
- Kurs Valüt in 2018

Background information
- Genres: EBM, Synth-pop
- Years active: 2017–present
- Members: Yevhen Hordieyev; Yevhen Kasyan

Kurs Valüt is a Ukrainian EBM/synth-pop band from Dnipro, which was founded in 2017 by Yevhen Hordieyev.

== History and style ==
The project's name Kurs Valüt means exchange rate in Ukrainian, it was used as a nickname for a party featuring Odesa-based band Klymentovo Pole. That set Hordieyev played with Stas Koroliov (known also for the project YuKo).

Kurs Valüt texts contain mentions of cultural phenomena, patterns and memes often discussed in Ukrainian medias and social networks ("покращення" ("improvement" was slogan of Viktor Yanukovych presidential campaign in 2010), "швидкогроші" ("fast money" is a popular network of fast credits), "інтерсіті" (intercity trains were a hot news when firstly appeared), "здобули" ("we won" or "we attained" was a meme with an opposite meaning from Euromaidan times)), also many constructions from the journalist language of television. Music also contains similar hints. For example, the song 4533 uses the sound of voting in Verkhovna Rada and the song Love inspektor uses the green light sound of Dnipro traffic lights.

Some texts are written by Ukrainian classics like Hryhoriy Skovoroda (Kurs Valüt) and Pavlo Tychyna (Veselo).

Kurs Valüt uses Latin alphabet in stylization.

In 2022-2023 Kurs Valüt went on European tour performing in Austria, Belgium, Czechia, Finland, France, Germany, Latvia, Lithuania, Poland, the Netherlands, Slovakia and Sweden.

Hordieyev described the project as follow: "Kurs Valüt is rather a study of pop pherment, a try to invent an unusual musical and textual solution without cliche. Refusal instead of suggestion, coldness instead of carnaval."

== Discography ==
Albums

- Veselo (2018)
- Kurs Valüt (2021)

Others

- Nemae Sliv (2019)
- Ni (2020)
- Nomer (2022)
