= Volodymyr Shcherbytsky =

Soviet Ukrainian politician (1918–1990)

- Володимир Щербицький
- Shcherbytsky, c. 1970s

First Secretary of the Communist Party of Ukraine
- In office 25 May 1972 – 28 September 1989
- Preceded by: Petro Shelest
- Succeeded by: Vladimir Ivashko

Chairman of the Council of Ministers of Ukraine
- In office 23 October 1965 – 25 May 1972
- Preceded by: Ivan Kazanets
- Succeeded by: Oleksandr Liashko
- In office 28 February 1961 – 26 June 1963
- Preceded by: Nikifor Kalchenko
- Succeeded by: Ivan Kazanets

First Secretary of the Dnipropetrovsk Regional Committee
- In office 7 July 1963 – 23 October 1965
- Preceded by: Nikita Tolubeev
- Succeeded by: Oleksiy Vatchenko
- In office December 1955 – December 1957
- Preceded by: Andrei Kirilenko
- Succeeded by: Anton Gayevoy

Personal details
- Born: 17 February 1918 Verkhnodniprovsk, Yekaterinoslav Governorate, Ukrainian People's Republic of Soviets, Russian SFSR (now Ukraine)
- Died: 16 February 1990 (aged 71) Kyiv, Ukrainian SSR, Soviet Union
- Resting place: Baikove Cemetery, Kyiv
- Party: Communist Party of the Soviet Union (1948–1989)
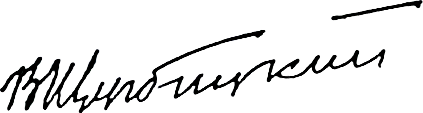
- Signature

Military service
- Allegiance: Soviet Union
- Branch/service: Red Army
- Years of service: 1941–1945
- Rank: Captain
- Battles/wars: World War II; Anglo-Soviet invasion of Iran
- Central institution membership: 1961–1963: Candidate member, 22nd Presidium; 1965–1966: Candidate member, 22nd Presidium; 1971–1989: Full member, 24th, 25th, 26th, 27th Politburo; 1961–1990: Full member, 22nd, 23rd, 24th, 25th, 26th, 27th Central Committee

Volodymyr Vasyliovych Shcherbytsky (Note: Ukrainian: Володи́мир Васи́льович Щерби́цький, IPA: [woloˈdɪmɪr wɐˈsɪlʲowɪt͡ʃ ʃt͡ʃerˈbɪtsʲkɪi̯] Russian: Влади́мир Васи́льевич Щерби́цкий, romanized: Vladimir Vasilyevich Shcherbitsky, IPA: [vlɐˈdʲimʲɪr vɐˈsʲilʲjɪvʲɪtɕ ɕːɪrˈbʲitskʲɪj]) (17 February 1918 – 16 February 1990) was a Ukrainian politician in the Soviet Union, who served as First Secretary of the Communist Party of Ukraine from 1972 to 1989. A close ally of Soviet leader Leonid Brezhnev, Shcherbytsky replaced the reformist leader, Petro Shelest, in 1972 as part of a crackdown on the Ukrainian intelligentsia. Under Shcherbytsky's rule, Ukraine was subjected to an intensive Russification campaign as well as a rapid shift to nuclear power, which ultimately resulted in the 1986 Chernobyl disaster. In 1989, Shcherbytsky was removed amidst widespread protests against his rule, and died months later.

== Biography ==
=== Early life ===
Shcherbytsky was born in Verkhnodniprovsk on 17 February 1918 to Vasily Grigorievich Shcherbytsky (1890–1949) and Tatyana Ivanovna Shcherbitskaya (1898–1990), just two weeks after the Soviet takeover of the city during the Ukrainian–Soviet War. During his school years, he worked as an activist and a member of the Komsomol from 1931. In 1934, while still in school, he became an instructor and agitator for the district committee of the Komsomol. In 1936, he entered the Faculty of Mechanics at the Dnipropetrovsk Chemical Technology Institute. During his training, he worked as a draftsman, designer and compressor driver at the factories in Dnipropetrovsk. Shcherbytsky graduated from the Dnipropetrovsk Chemical Technology Institute in 1941 and in the same year became a member of the Communist Party of the Soviet Union.

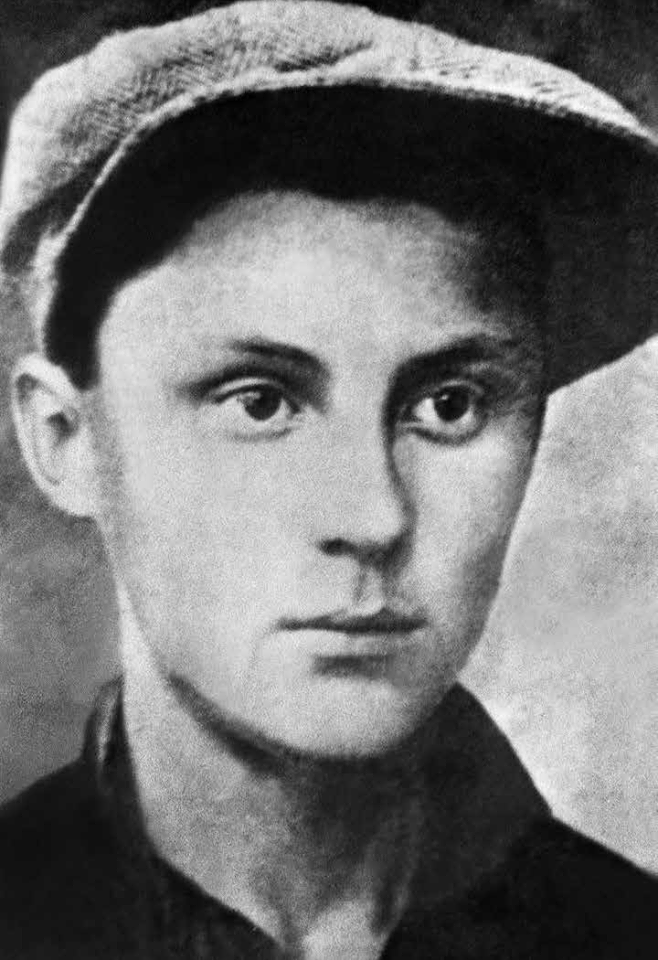
Shcherbytsky during his youth

=== Military career ===
Following the German invasion of the Soviet Union in June 1941, Shcherbytsky was mobilized into the ranks of the Red Army. Because he was a graduate with a major in chemical equipment and machinery, he was sent to attend short term courses at the Military Academy of Chemical Protection named after Voroshilov, which was evacuated from Moscow to Samarkand in Uzbek SSR. After graduation, Shcherbytsky was appointed head of the chemical unit within the 34th Infantry Regiment of the 473rd Infantry Division in the Transcaucasian Front. In November 1941, the division was formed in the cities of Baku and Sumgayit in Azerbaijan SSR. On 8 January 1942, the division was renamed as 75th Rifle Division, and in April of the same year, Shcherbytsky and the division took part in the Anglo-Soviet invasion of Iran. On the same year, he served in a tank brigade.

In March 1943, Shcherbytsky was transferred to the chemical department at the headquarters of the Transcaucasian Front, where he served until the end of the war. In August 1945, the Transcaucasian Front was reorganized into the Tbilisi Military District and Shcherbytsky's last military assignment was as an assistant chief of the chemistry department of the district headquarters for combat training. In December 1945, he left the military service at the rank of captain.

=== Beginning of political career ===
After World War II, he worked as an engineer in Dniprodzerzhynsk (now Kamianske). From 1948 Shcherbytsky was a party functionary in the Communist Party of the Soviet Union. In 1948, he was appointed Second Secretary of Dniprodzerhynsk city communist party committee, soon after Leonid Brezhnev had taken over the First Secretary of the regional party committee. He succeeded Brezhnev as regional party boss in November 1955. In December 1957, he was appointed a Secretary of the Central Committee of the Communist Party of Ukraine. In February 1961, he was appointed chairman of the Ukrainian Council of Ministers, the second highest post in the republic, but in June 1963, just after Petro Shelest had been appointed First Secretary of the Communist Party of Ukraine, Shcherbytsky was shifted to the lesser job of First Secretary of the Dnipropetrovsk regional party committee. On 16 October 1965, after Brezhnev had risen to the supreme position as General Secretary of the Communist Party of the Soviet Union, Shcherbytsky was restored to his former position at the head of the Ukrainian government.

=== First Secretary of the Communist Party of Ukraine ===
In May 1972, Shelest was recalled from his post as head of the Ukrainian government, as part of a broader attack on the nationally-minded Ukrainian intelligentsia by the central Soviet government that had begun in January. He was instead transferred to Moscow and elected to be the Deputy Chairman of the Council of Ministers of the Soviet Union. As a result of this development, the Central Committee of the Communist Party of Ukraine (CPU) elected Shcherbytysky as their new First Secretary; this was the highest political office in the Ukrainian SSR. While Shelest had pushed for increased Ukrainian autonomy from Moscow, and had been a supporter of increased Ukrainian cultural identification, Shcherbytsky was unfailingly loyal to Brezhnev, and conducted policy accordingly.

Shcherbytsky's appointment was both a victory for the Soviet government and a personal victory for Brezhnev; Shcherbytsky was a member of Brezhnev's political clan, the Dnipropetrovsk Mafia, which was opposed to Shelest's Kharkiv Clan. In government, Shcherbytsky relied on a group of party cadres from both the Dnipropetrovsk Mafia and emerging Donetsk Clan, both of whom were more supportive of Russification than other political clans in Ukraine. The Kharkiv Clan was pushed out of government and marginalised. Ideologically, Shcherbytsky was a neo-Stalinist and hardline conservative.

The first year of his rule was marked by a wide-reaching purge of the CPU and Ukrainian civil society. As a result of the purge, which was co-orchestrated by Valentyn Malanchuk, 5% of the CPU's members were removed, and several leading Ukrainian intellectuals, among them anti-Communist leaders Viacheslav Chornovil, Ivan Svitlychnyi, and Yevhen Sverstiuk, were arrested. Described by Peter Reddaway as the "heaviest single KGB assault", the intelligentsia interpreted the purge as an effort to undo Shelest's rule and reestablish Russian control over Ukraine. Ivan Dziuba's book Internationalism or Russification?, which was critical of the role the Russian language played in the Soviet Union, was harshly criticised and suppressed by the Ukrainian government. Dziuba himself was later arrested and sentenced to five years of hard labour. Arrested dissidents were linked to the Organisation of Ukrainian Nationalists, then operating abroad. The purge led to increased radicalism among the dissident movement, bringing many in the dissident movement to consider the outright separation of Ukraine from the Soviet Union rather than simply increased autonomy.

Further purges continued throughout the 1970s, including against the Ukrainian academia and the filmmaking community. Through the Helsinki Accords the dissident movement reemerged and strengthened its position despite continuous attacks by Shcherbytsky's government.

=== Role in Soviet top leadership ===
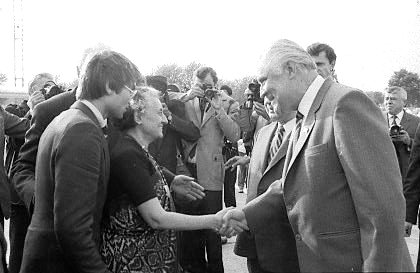
Shcherbytsky meets Prime Minister of India Indira Gandhi in Kyiv in 1982.

Shcherbytsky was also an influential figure in the Soviet Union's larger government. In April 1971, he was promoted to membership of the Politburo, on which he remained a close ally of Brezhnev.

On March 7, 1985, Shcherbytsky visited the United States, where he met with President Ronald Reagan to discuss the potential resumption of arms control negotiations. The talks between Reagan and Shcherbytsky were reportedly tense from the outset, with Shcherbytsky characterizing the United States as a "destabilizing force." Following the meeting, Reagan remarked that Shcherbytsky would return home with a clear understanding that the United States was open to negotiations. However, Reagan emphasized that the United States would not lower its defenses or permit the Soviet Union to expand its offensive capabilities unchecked.

=== Downfall ===
Following Brezhnev's death, he was replaced as General Secretary at first by Yuri Andropov and Konstantin Chernenko before the ascension of Mikhail Gorbachev. In 1985, Shcherbytsky was in San Francisco, United States when he received news about Chernenko's death and that the Politburo was in the process of picking up a successor. By the time he was airborne, he had received news about the election of Gorbachev as General Secretary.

Gorbachev's liberal rule contrasted heavily with Shcherbytsky's hardline principles, and remaining Brezhnev loyalists either retired from their positions or were removed by Gorbachev. Shcherbytsky's removal was originally planned by Gorbachev, owing to the former's hardline rule. However, he decided to allow him to remain in office for several more years in order to keep the Ukrainian nationalist movement subdued. Shcherbytsky was likewise a strong opponent of Gorbachev, saying in one instance:

What fool (durak) invented this word perestroika? Why rebuild the house? Is there anything wrong in the Soviet Union? We are fine! What is there to rebuild? It is necessary to improve, reorganize, but why, if the house is not falling apart, why does it need to be rebuilt?

Karen Dawisha and Bruce Parrott have argued that Shcherbytsky's rule was among the most corrupt and conservative among the Soviet republics. An advocate of increased nuclear power, Shcherbytsky's position was significantly impacted by the 1986 Chernobyl disaster. After the disaster, Shcherbytsky was ordered by Gorbachev to go ahead with the annual International Workers' Day parade on the Khreshchatyk in Kyiv, in an effort to show people that there was no reason for panic. He went ahead with this plan, knowing that there was danger of spreading radiation sickness and even taking his own grandson Volodya to the celebrations. But he arrived late, and complained to aides: "He told me: 'You will put your party card on the table if you bungle the parade'." The continually-worsening state of the Ukrainian economy, particularly in the industrial Donbas region of eastern Ukraine, also undermined his popularity.

Gorbachev's campaign of Glasnost, which called for increased openness regarding political matters, led to a beginning of widespread expressions of discontent at the status of the Ukrainian economy beginning in 1986. Political groups in opposition to Shcherbytsky's rule began to form in 1987, and the next year, protests against his government began in the western Ukrainian city of Lviv. In December 1987 Shcherbytsky was for the first time forced to officially acknowledge the events of the Holodomor, information about which had been hidden by Soviet authorities for over half a century, in a public speech, blaming the famine on a supposed drought.

In July 1989, a series of strikes by coal miners in the eastern Donbas region of Ukraine, spurred by strikes in Siberia, began. Shcherbytsky's government replied by discrediting the strikes in state media and downplaying their significance. As the strikes increased in intensity, so, too, did their demands, as increasing numbers of miners demanded Ukrainian independence from the Soviet Union and the resignation of Shcherbytsky, as well as Chairman of the Supreme Soviet of the Ukrainian SSR Valentyna Shevchenko. The People's Movement of Ukraine, a Ukrainian nationalist political movement inspired by the Lithuanian Sąjūdis, was also founded in September 1989 by dissident leader Chornovil, and gathered far-reaching support from its early days.

In the face of the strikes and continued pressure to step down from Moscow, Shcherbytsky was quickly removed from all of his offices. On 20 September 1989, Shcherbytsky lost his membership of the Politburo of the Communist Party of the Soviet Union in a purge of conservative members pushed through by Gorbachev. Eight days later, upon the personal intervention of Gorbachev, he was removed as First Secretary of the KPU (officially due to old age) and replaced by Vladimir Ivashko, who took a more conciliatory line towards the growing protests. His removal, however, was not enough to stem the rapidly-growing discontent with the Soviet system in Ukraine, which continued to grow until Ukraine achieved independence two years later.

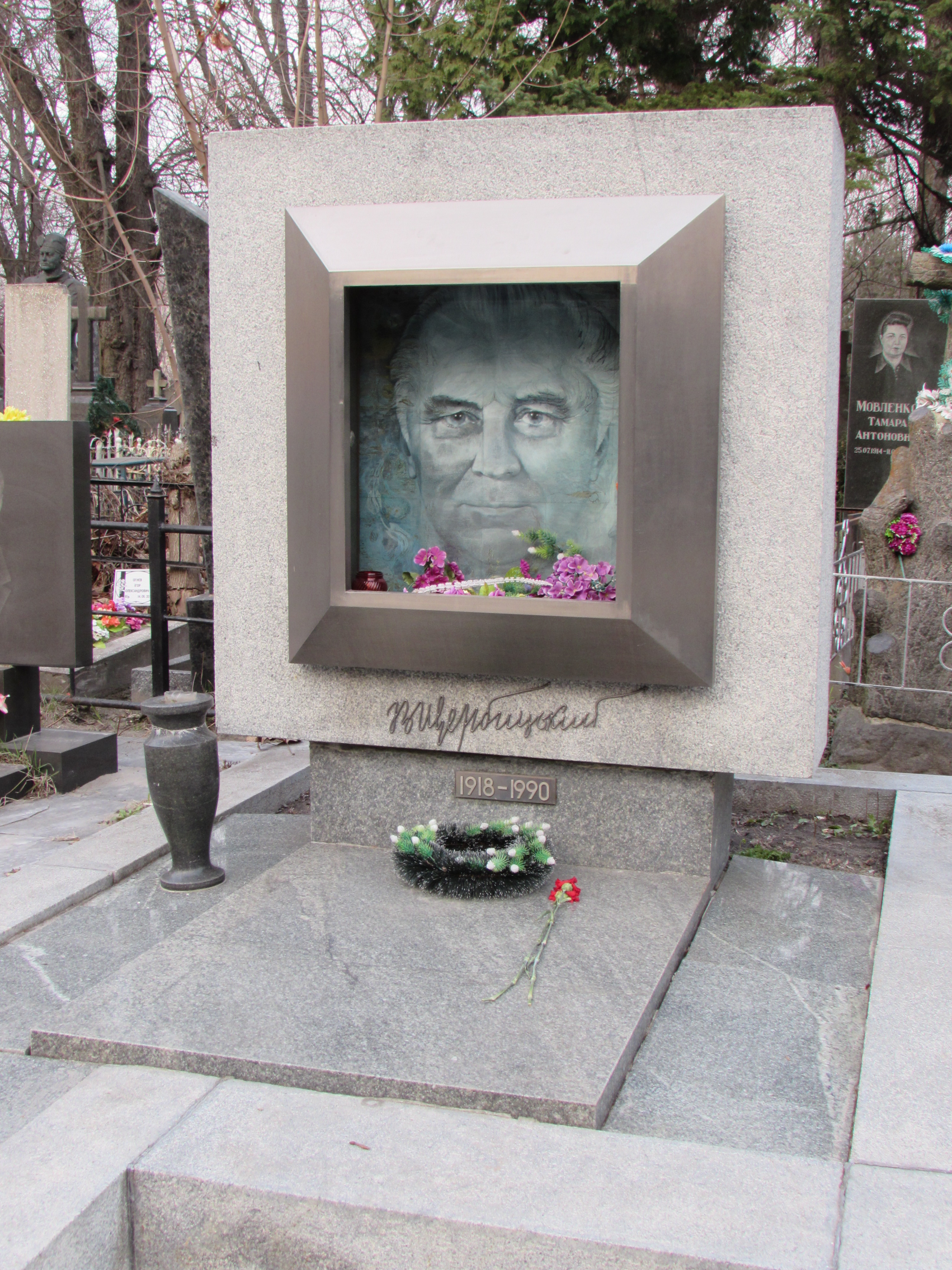
Grave of Volodymyr Shcherbytsky

=== Death and burial ===
Shcherbytsky died on 16 February 1990 - one day before his 72nd birthday, which was also when he was supposed to testify in the Supreme Soviet of the Ukrainian SSR about the events related to the Chernobyl disaster. Although the official version claims that the cause of death was pneumonia, it was alleged that he had committed suicide by shooting himself with his carbine, "unable to deal not only with the end of his own career but also with the end of the political and social order he had served all his life" and had left a suicide note explaining to his wife how to deal with cash, medals and small arms that were kept in the family home. He was buried at the Baikove Cemetery in Kyiv.

== Legacy ==
=== Cultural policies ===
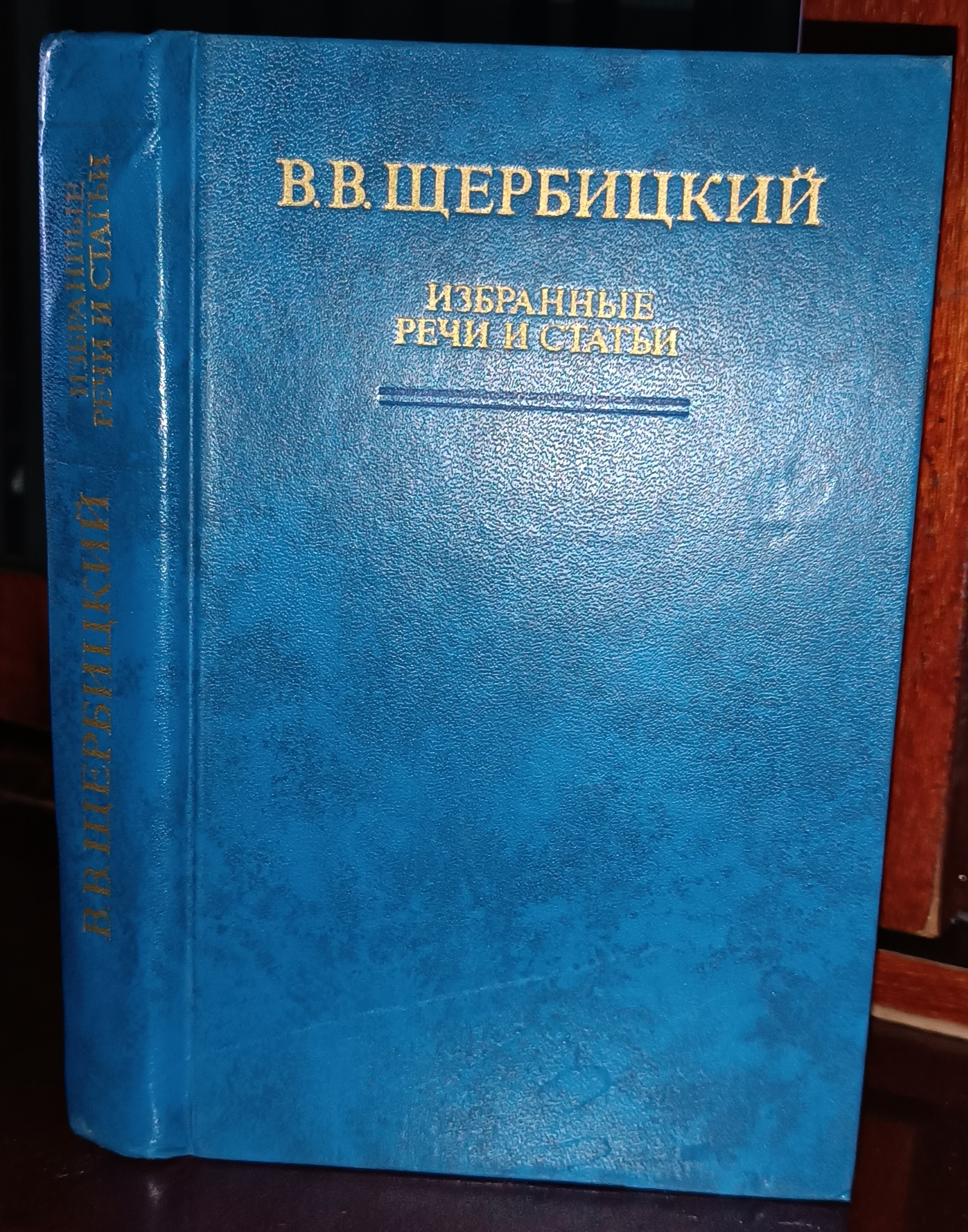
A collection of Shcherbytsky's speeches published by Politizdat in the Russian language in 1978

Shcherbytsky's rule of the Ukrainian Soviet Socialist Republic was characterized by the expanded policies of re-centralisation and suppression of Soviet dissidents, accompanied by a broad assault on Ukrainian culture and intensification of Russification. He diminished the degree of official usage of Ukrainian language. Under his leadership, all meetings of the CPU were conducted in Russian, and Ukrainian education was further Russified. By the time of Brezhnev's death, fewer books had been published in Ukrainian throughout his rule than during the rule of Stalin, a result owed in part to Shcherbytsky. During Shcherbytsky's rule mass arrests were carried out that incarcerated any member of the intelligentsia that dared to dissent from official state policies. The expirations of political prisoners' sentences were increasingly followed by re-arrest and new sentences on charges of criminal activity. Incarceration in psychiatric institutions became a new method of political repression.

Ukrainian language press, scholarly, and cultural organisations which had flourished under Shcherbytsky's predecessor Shelest were repressed under his administration. Shcherbytsky also made a point of speaking Russian at official functions while Shelest spoke Ukrainian in public events. In an October 1973 speech to fellow party members Shcherbytsky stated that as "internationalists", Ukrainians were meant to "express feelings of friendship and brotherhood to all people of our country but first of all to the great Russian people, their culture, their language - the language of the Revolution, of Lenin, the language of international intercourse and unity". Shcherbytsky also claimed that "the worst enemy of the Ukrainian people" is "Ukrainian bourgeois nationalism and also international Zionism". During Shcherbytsky's rule, Ukrainian-language education was greatly scaled back. Ukrainian writer Oles Honchar called Shcherbytsky "the most loyal Russifier" and "worse criminal than Menshikov and Kaganovich".

Shcherbytsky was opposed to the prominence of Ukrainian poetic cinema, condemning it for excess use of abstraction and ethnographic elements. Following the 24th Congress of the Communist Party of the Soviet Union, he delivered a report, claiming that positive views on that cultural movement in the society have been suppressed. On the day of Shcherbytsky's speech, film director Sergei Parajanov was expelled from the Union of Cinematographers of Ukraine.

Despite Shcherbytsky's stance against all forms of Ukrainian nationalism and his break with the explicit pro-Ukrainian politics of Shelest, he still broadly "defended the use of the Ukrainian language, promoted Ukraine’s particular interests, and defended certain aspects of Ukrainian culture, such as Shevchenko’s poetry". According to academician Petro Tronko, while serving as head of government of the Ukrainian SSR, Shcherbytsky provided significant help in the erection of monuments to Ukrainian Cossacks, lobbied the publication of The History of Cities and Villages of the Ukrainian SSR and supported the creation of the National Museum of Folk Architecture and Folkways of Ukraine.

Shcherbytsky was a longtime supporter and patron of football manager Valeriy Lobanovsky, whose activities as coach of Dynamo Kyiv and Soviet Union national football team made Ukraine a football hub of the whole Soviet Union. Shcherbytsky's promotion of football in Ukraine is considered by some to have contributed to the preservation of a local identity by Ukrainians, helped by Dynamo's successes under his tenure.

In 1994 the first President of Ukraine of independent Ukraine Leonid Kravchuk in interviews stated his views about Shcherbytsky’s positive legacy.

=== Commemoration ===
In January 2003 Dmytro Tabachnyk, Deputy Prime Minister of Ukraine on humanitarian policy in the first Yanukovych Government, signed a resolution to celebrate Shcherbytsky’s 85th anniversary with the erection of a monument in Kyiv. In 2012 memorial plaques to Shcherbytsky and Brezhnev were installed in Dnipropetrovsk, leading to protests by opposition political forces. In February 2013 a memorial plaque to Shcherbytsky was also unveiled on a house where he resided in Kyiv.

Due to Ukrainian decommunization laws a street named after Shcherbytsky in Dnipro (formerly Dnipropetrovsk) was renamed to Olena Blavatsky Street in 2015. In 2016 a street named after him in Kamianske was renamed to Viacheslav Chornovil Street for the same reasons.

In Shcherbytsky's birthplace Verkhnodniprovsk a bust depicting him was dismantled on 18 January 2024.

== Personal life ==
Shcherbytsky was married to Ariadna (Rada) Gavrilovna Shcherbitskaya, née Zheromskaya (1923–2015) on 13 November 1945. The couple had two children; son Valery (1946–1991), who died due to alcohol and drug addiction just one year after Shcherbytsky's death, and a daughter Olga (1953–2014), who died at a hospital in Kyiv after a serious and prolonged illness. He also had numerous grand and great-grandchildren. Olga was married to Bulgarian businessman Borislav Dionisiev, who then was a soldier in the Bulgarian People's Army and a Consul General of Bulgaria in Odesa. The couple had a daughter before divorcing on an unknown date.

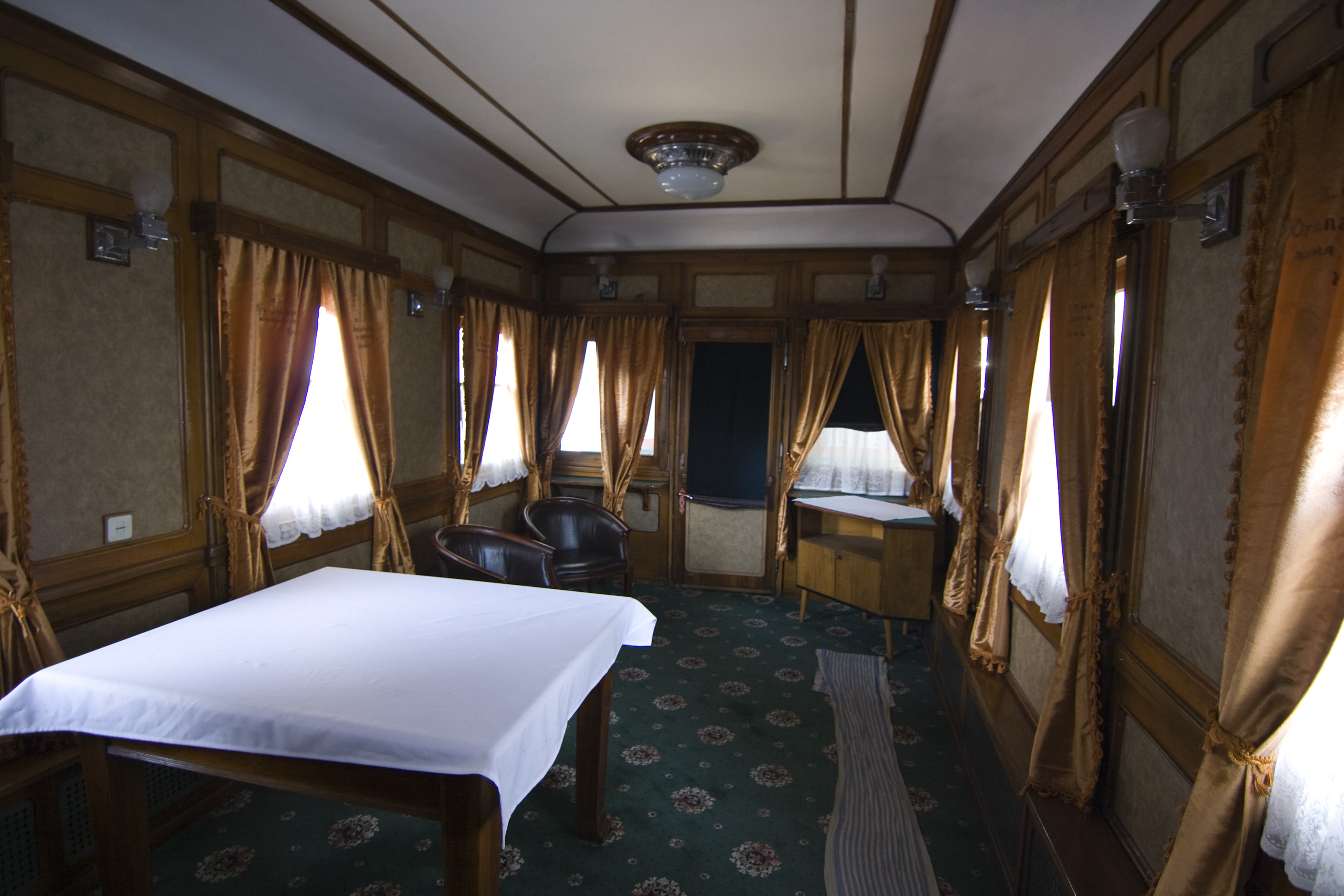
Interior of Shcherbytsky's rail wagon

Like many members of the Soviet elite, Shcherbytsky was an avid hunter. He was also a fan of football, and would watch games on television even while on a hunting trip.

On the post of First Secretary, Shcherbytsky was provided with a personal electric-powered rail wagon for travel purposes along with party leaders of other Soviet republics. Since 2011, Shcherbytsky's wagon has been exhibited at the Kyiv Museum of Railway Transport.

== Awards ==
Volodymyr Shcherbytsky was twice awarded the Hero of Socialist Labour — in 1974 and 1977. During his public service he also received numerous other civil and state awards and recognitions, including the Order of Lenin (in 1958, 1968, 1971, 1973, 1977, 1983 and 1988), the Order of October Revolution (in 1978 and 1982), the Order of the Patriotic War, I class (in 1985), the Medal "For the Defence of the Caucasus" (in 1944) and various medals. He was also awarded the Order of Victorious February by the Government of Czechoslovakia (in 1978).

== Notes ==
Party political offices
Preceded by Petro Shelest	1st Secretary of the Communist Party of Ukraine; 1972–1989	Succeeded by Vladimir Ivashko
Preceded by Andriy Kyrylenko; Mykyta Tolubeyev	1st Secretary of the Communist Party of Dnipropetrovsk Oblast; 1955–1957; 1963–1965	Succeeded by Anton Hayevyi; Oleksiy Vatchenko
Political offices
Preceded by Nykyfor Kalchenko; Ivan Kazanets	Prime Minister of Ukraine (Ukrainian SSR); 1961–1963; 1965–1972	Succeeded by Ivan Kazanets; Oleksandr Liashko
