= Oleksandr Liashko =

Soviet Ukrainian politician (1916–2002)

- Олександр Ляшко

Chairman of the Council of Ministers of the Ukrainian SSR
- In office 9 June 1972 – 10 July 1987
- Preceded by: Volodymyr Shcherbytsky
- Succeeded by: Vitaliy Masol

Member of the Central Committee of the Communist Party of the Soviet Union
- In office 1961 – 25 April 1989

Personal details
- Born: 12 January [O.S. 30 December 1915] 1916 Rodakove, Russian Empire (now Ukraine)
- Died: 9 October 2002 (aged 86)
- Resting place: Baikove Cemetery, Kyiv
- Political party: Communist Party of the Soviet Union (1942–1991)
- Awards: Hero of Socialist Labour

Military service
- Allegiance: Soviet Union
- Rank: Lieutenant
- Battles/wars: World War II; Battle of the Caucasus

Oleksandr Pavlovych Liashko (Ukrainian: Олександр Павлович Ляшко; 12 January [O.S. 30 December 1915] 1916 – 9 October 2002) was a Soviet Ukrainian politician. He served as the Chairman of the Council of Ministers of the Ukrainian SSR (a role equivalent to today's Prime Minister of Ukraine) for more than 15 years, making him the longest-serving person in that position. Liashko was also a member of the Central Committee of the Communist Party of the Soviet Union from 1961 to 1989. In 1985, he was honored with the Hero of Socialist Labour award.

== Biography ==
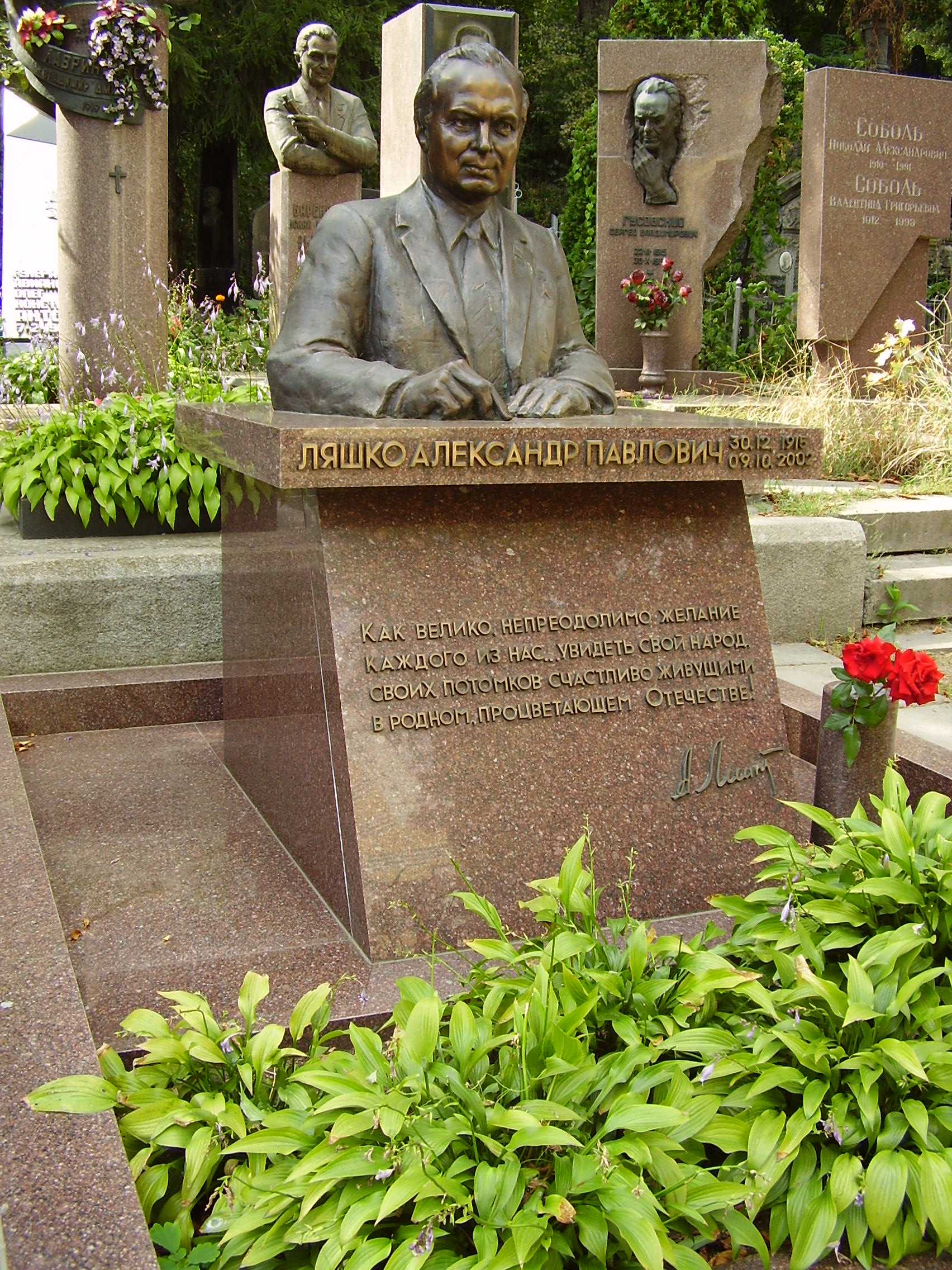
Liashko's grave in Baikove Cemetery, Kyiv

Oleksandr Liashko was born into a family of a railway worker in Rodakove, located in present-day Luhansk Oblast, eastern Ukraine. He attended a technical school and later matriculated at the Donetsk Industrial Institute in 1937.

In the summer of 1941, Liashko and his classmates were sent as cadets to the 2nd Kharkiv Tank School. After graduating from the school in 1942, he received the rank of lieutenant and was assigned to the Gorky Automobile Plant, which had begun producing tanks. He became a member of the Communist Party of the Soviet Union (CPSU) (b) in 1942.

The platoon commanded by Liashko received combat vehicles and was transferred to the North Caucasus Front. After organizing effective repairs of military equipment in 1943, he returned to the tank school, where he taught special subjects until the end of the war.

Starting in 1945, Liashko worked as an engineer in the open-hearth shop at the Novokramatorsk Machine-Building Plant in the Stalin Region. Concurrently, he continued his studies at the Donetsk Industrial Institute, graduating in 1947 with a degree in metallurgical and mechanical engineering.

From 1947, Liashko served as deputy head of the transport department, then as deputy director, and from 1951, he became a party member of the Central Committee of the CPSU (b) at the New Kramatorsk Machinebuilding Factory in Stalino Oblast.

From August 1952 to 1954, he was the first secretary of the Kramatorsk city committee of the Communist Party of Stalino Oblast.

From 1954 to 1957, Liashko served as secretary of the Stalino Oblast committee of the Communist Party. From 1957 to 1 March 1960, he was the second secretary of the Stalinist regional committee of the Communist Party.

From March 1, 1960, to January 1963, he served as the First Secretary of the Stalino Oblast Committee of the Communist Party. From January 1963 to July 11, 1963, he was the First Secretary of the Donetsk Regional Industrial Committee of the Communist Party.

From July 2, 1963, to March 18, 1966, he was Secretary of the Central Committee of the Communist Party of Ukraine and Chairman of the Bureau of the Central Committee of the Communist Party for Industry and Construction.

From March 18, 1966, to June 19, 1969, he served as the 2nd Secretary of the Central Committee of the Communist Party.

From June 20, 1969, to June 9, 1972, he was Chairman of the Presidium of the Verkhovna Rada of the Ukrainian SSR.

On June 9, 1972, Liashko became Chairman of the Council of Ministers of the Ukrainian SSR. In May 1986, he headed the Republican Government Commission for the Elimination of the Consequences of the Chernobyl Accident. On July 10, 1987, the fifth session of the Verkhovna Rada of the Ukrainian SSR relieved Liashko of his duties as Chairman of the Council of Ministers of the Ukrainian SSR.

Since 1987, he has been a personal pensioner of union significance in Kyiv.

He was married to Davydova Klavdia Andriivna, and had two children, Volodymyr and Nina.

Liashko authored three books of memoirs: "The Way of Survival", "The Way to the Nomenclature" (1997), "On the Steps of Power" (2001).

He died on 9 October 2002, and was buried in Kyiv at the Baikove Cemetery.

== Awards ==
- Hero of Socialist Labour (29 December 1985)
- Order of Lenin (29 December 1965, 25 August 1971, 8 December 1973, 29 December 1975, 22 December 1977 and 29 December 1985)
- Order of the Patriotic War, I class (11 March 1985)
- Order of the Red Banner of Labour (20 August 1957 and 26 February 1958)
- Order of Prince Yaroslav the Wise 5th class (29 December 2000)

Political offices
Preceded by Demyan Korotchenko	Chairman of the Presidium of the Supreme Soviet of the Ukrainian SSR; 1969–1972	Succeeded by Ivan Hrushetsky
Preceded by Volodymyr Shcherbytsky	Chairman of the Council of Ministers of the Ukrainian SSR; 1972–1987	Succeeded by Vitaliy Masol
