= Pavlo Tychyna Museum =

Literary museum in Kyiv

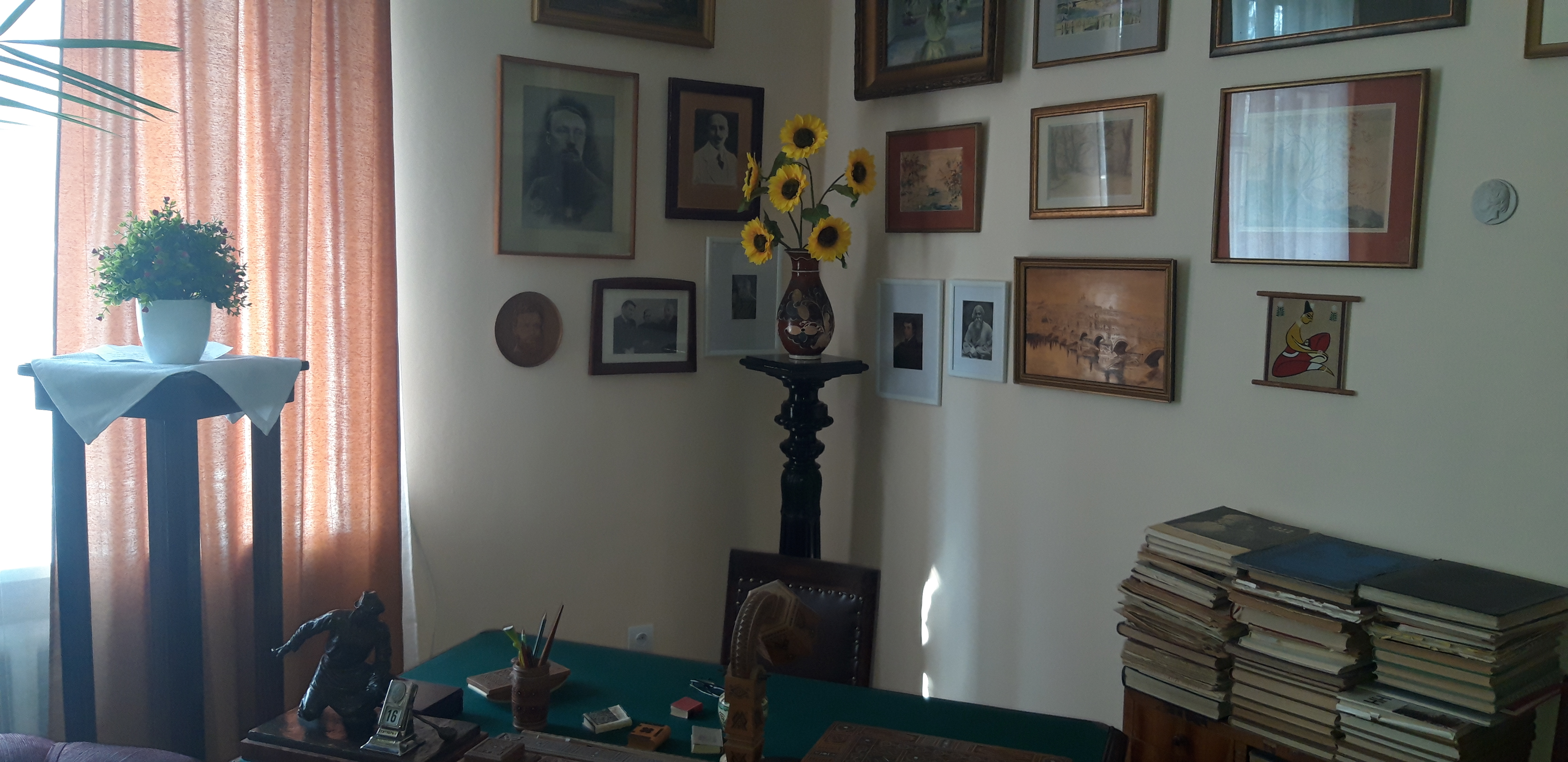
- Location: 5 Tereshchenkivska St, Apt. 1, 3, Kyiv, Ukraine
- Coordinates: 50°26′38.35″N 30°30′55.85″E

Immovable Monument of Local Significance of Ukraine
- Official name: Будинок житловий, в якому проживали відомі письменники, вчені, державні, політичні діячі (Residential house where famous writers, scientists, state and political activists lived)
- Type: Architecture, History
- Reference no.: 1111-Кв

The Pavlo Tychyna Museum (officially titled Literary and Memorial Museum of Pavlo Tychyna, in Ukrainian: Літературно-меморіальний музей-квартира П. Г. Тичини) is one of the museums in Kyiv, Ukraine, dedicated to Ukrainian writer Pavlo Tychyna.

The museum was commenced in February 1989, and it was opened on 27 January 1980. The memorial flat was created at the premises where the poet lived from 1944 till 1967.

The museum has preserved the interiors of the rooms; it displays only the memorial belongings of the poet. The visitors can view the poet's library (over 20,000 books), the cabinet, the dining-room etc. The interiors reflect the epoch when Tychyna lived, demonstrating his how-to-live, interests so on.

The museum offers regular and irregular exhibitions, organizes different cultural and memorial events.
