= Mykhailo Hrechukha =

Ukrainian and Soviet politician (1902–1976)

- Михайло Гречуха
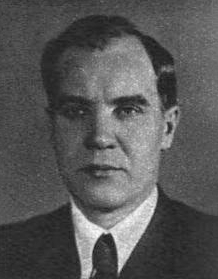

First Secretary of the Zhytomyr Regional Committee of CP(b)U
- In office 14 December 1938 – 28 July 1939
- Preceded by: Maksym Didenko
- Succeeded by: Mykhailo Syromiatnikov

Chairman of the Presidium of the Verkhovna Rada
- In office 28 July 1939 – 18 January 1954
- Preceded by: Leonid Korniets
- Succeeded by: Demyan Korotchenko

1st Deputy Chairman of the Soviet of Ministers of the Ukrainian SSR
- In office 1954–1959
- Premier: Nikifor Kalchenko

Personal details
- Born: 19 September 1902 Cherkasy County, Kiev Governorate, Russian Empire
- Died: 15 May 1976 (aged 73) Kiev, Ukrainian SSR, Soviet Union
- Party: All-Union Communist Party (bolsheviks)
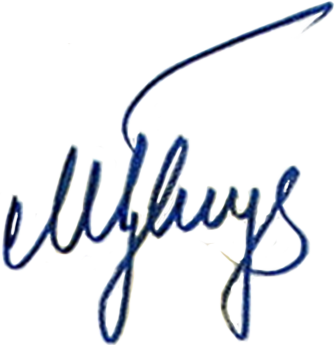
- Signature

Mykhailo Serhiyovych Hrechukha (Ukrainian: Михайло Сергійович Гречуха; 19 September 1902 – 15 May 1976) was a Soviet Ukrainian politician, who served as the Chairman of Presidium of the Supreme Council of the Ukrainian Soviet Socialist Republic from 1939 to 1954. He was elected to the 1st through 5th convocations of Verkhovna Rada of the Ukrainian SSR.

== Biography ==
Mykhailo Hrechukha was born on 19 September 1902 in the village of Moshny within the Ukrainian SSR, that today is located in Cherkasy Raion, central Ukraine. He was born into a family of poor peasants. In 1922, he joined the Komsomol, becoming Secretary of the Komsomol for the village of Moshny. He then became the Chairman of the Moshny District Council of Trade Unions of the Cherkasy District and also District Head of the Department of Public Education, Secretary, Chairman of the Executive Committee of the District Council. In 1926, he became a full member of the CPSU. Afterwards, he was first appointed instructor then Head of the Organizational and Instructor Department of the Shevchenkivskyi District within Kyiv (Kiev). In 1936, he graduated from the Kharkiv Automobile and Highway Institute.

Afterwards, he worked as a mechanical engineer for Southern Railways. In 1938, he was appointed the 1st Secretary of the Zhytomyr Regional Committee of CP(b)U, after having previously being its 2nd Secretary in early 1938. He was also briefly Secretary of the Executive Committee of the Kharkiv (Kharkov) Regional Council. From 1939 to 1954 he was then Chairman of Presidium of the Supreme Council of the Ukrainian Soviet Socialist Republic. During his tenure, World War II occurred, during which he took part in the reconstruction of the Ukrainian SSR, and he helped establish contact with other republics of the USSR.

In 1954 he became 1st Deputy Chairman of the Council of Ministers of the Ukrainian SSR, and then in 1959 he became Deputy Chairman of the Council of Ministers of the Ukrainian SSR. Finally, from 1962 to 1966, he was Advisor to the Council of Ministers of the Ukrainian SSR before he formally retired from politics in 1966.

== See also ==
- List of mayors of Zhytomyr

Political offices
Preceded by Leonid Korniets	Chairman of the Presidium of the Supreme Soviet of the Ukrainian SSR; 1939-1954	Succeeded by Demyan Korotchenko
