= Cherkasy Regional Committee of the Communist Party of Ukraine =

The Cherkasy Regional Committee of the Communist Party of Ukraine, commonly referred to as the Cherkasy CPU obkom, was the position of highest authority in the Cherkasy Oblast, in the Ukrainian SSR of the Soviet Union.

The First Secretary was a de facto appointed position usually by the Central Committee of the Communist Party of Ukraine or the First Secretary of the Republic.

== List of First Secretaries of the Communist Party of Cherkasy Oblast ==
Name	Term of Office		Life years
Name	Start	End	Life years
First Secretaries of the Oblast Committee of the Communist Party
Borys Volytovsky	January 1954	6 February 1960	1906–1983
Leontiy Naidek	6 February 1960	December 1964	1907–1992
Vasyl Rychko	8 January 1963	December 1964	1919–1977
Oleksiy Vatchenko	December 1964	28 October 1965	1914–1984
Oleksandr Andreyev	28 October 1965	27 January 1976	1917–1988
Ivan Lutak	27 January 1976	9 September 1988	1919–2009
Oleksandr Ruzhytskyi	9 September 1988	26 August 1991	1938–2017

== See also ==
- Cherkasy Oblast

== Sources ==
- World Statesmen.org
