= Ivan Kazanets =

Ukrainian Soviet politician (1918–2013)

- Іван Казанець

Minister of Metallurgy
- In office 1965–1985
- Premier: Alexei Kosygin; Nikolai Tikhonov
- Preceded by: Position reestablished
- Succeeded by: Serafim Kolpakov

Personal details
- Born: 12 October 1918 Lotsmanska, Ukrainian SSR, Soviet Union
- Died: 15 February 2013 (aged 94) Moscow, Russia
- Resting place: Troyekurovskoye Cemetery, Moscow
- Party: Communist Party
- Education: Dnipropetrovsk Industrial Technical School; Siberian Metallurgic Institute
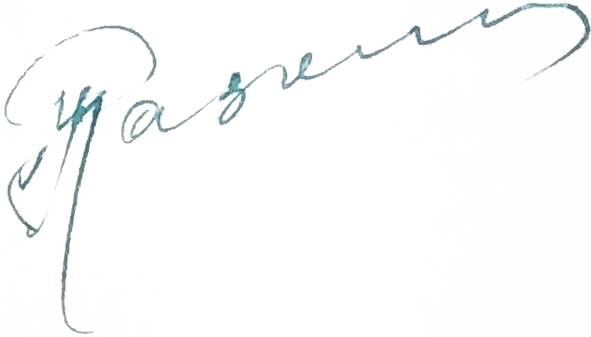
- Signature

Ivan Pavlovych Kazanets (Ukrainian: Іван Павлович Казанець; 12 October 1918 – 15 February 2013) was a Ukrainian, Russian, and Soviet politician who held several posts, including chairman of the council of ministers of the Ukrainian SSR and the Soviet minister of ferrous metallurgy.

== Biography ==
Ivan Kazanets was born on 12 October 1918 in Lotsmanska village in Dnipropetrovsk Oblast, central Ukraine into a peasant family. In 1937, he graduated from Dnipropetrovsk Industrial Technical School, and then he worked as an electrician, engineer, and then head of a substation section at the Kuznetsk Metallurgical Combine. In 1944, he also graduated from the Siberian Metallurgic Institute, which was located within Novokuznetsk of the Russian SFSR. He was then a worker at the Yenakiieve Metallurgical Plant until 1952, where he became party organizer of the CPSU at the plant in 1950.

In 1952, he started taking on party leadership roles, becoming First Secretary of the Yenakiieve City Committee, and then from 1952 to 1953 he was First Secretary of the Makiivka City Committee. From 1953 to 1960 he was First Secretary of the Donetsk Oblast Committee, and then Second Secretary of the Central Committee of the Communist Party of Ukraine.

He served as the chairman of the council of ministers of the Ukrainian SSR (equivalent of today's Prime Minister of Ukraine) from 1963 to 1965. He was the minister of ferrous metallurgy of the Soviet Union for almost 20 years. His tenure ended in July 1985 when Serafim Kolpakov replaced him in the post. Simultaneously, he was a Deputy of the Supreme Soviet of the USSR from its 4th to 10th convocations.

After 1985, he retired as a personal pensioner. He served as a member of the Community of Donbass residents of Moscow, worked as a consultant to the company Chermet, and was an advisor to the Chairman of the Committee of the Russian Federation for Metallurgy.

== Awards ==
During his public service, Ivan Kazanets received numerous civil and state awards and recognitions, including the Order of Lenin (in 1957, 1958, 1966, 1968 and 1971), the Order of the October Revolution (in 1978), and 20 medals, four of which are from foreign countries. In 1996, he became a meritorious metallurgist of the Russian Federation.

Political offices
Preceded by Volodymyr Shcherbytsky	Prime Minister of Ukraine (Ukrainian SSR); 1963–1965	Succeeded by Volodymyr Shcherbytsky
