= Oleksiy Vatchenko =

Ukrainian and Soviet politician

- Олексій Ватченко
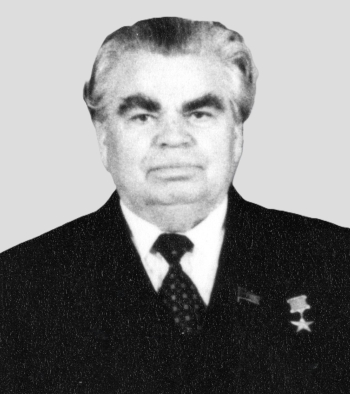
- Vatchenko in 1982

Chairman of Presidium of the Supreme Soviet of the Ukrainian SSR
- In office 24 June 1976 – 22 November 1984
- Preceded by: Ivan Hrushetsky
- Succeeded by: Valentyna Shevchenko

First Secretary of the Dnipropetrovsk Regional Committee of the Communist Party of Ukraine
- In office October 1965 – 29 June 1976
- Preceded by: Volodymyr Shcherbytsky
- Succeeded by: Yevhen Kachalovsky

First Secretary of the Cherkasy Regional Committee of the Communist Party of Ukraine
- In office December 1964 – October 1965
- Preceded by: Industrial: Vasyl Rychko; Rural: Leontiy Naidek
- Succeeded by: Oleksandr Andreyev

First Secretary of the Khmelnytskyi Regional Committee of the Communist Party of Ukraine
- In office 1959 – January 1963
- Preceded by: Vasyl Behma
- Succeeded by: Industrial: Kostiantyn Yanovytsky; Rural: Mykyta Bubnovsky

Personal details
- Born: 25 February 1914 Yelizaveto-Kamyanets, Yekaterinoslav Governorate, Russian Empire
- Died: 22 November 1984 (aged 70) Kiev, Ukrainian SSR, Soviet Union
- Party: All-Union Communist Party (bolsheviks)

Oleksiy Fedosiyovych Vatchenko (Ukrainian: Олексій Федосійович Ватченко; 25 February 1914 – 22 November 1984) was a Ukrainian and Soviet politician, who served as the chairman of Presidium of the Supreme Council of the Ukrainian Soviet Socialist Republic from 1976 to 1984.

== Biography ==
Oleksiy Vatchenko was born on 25 February 1914 in the village of Yelizaveto-Kamyanets that today is located in Dnipro, Ukraine into a peasant family. His sister was Horpyna Vatchenko, director of the Dmytro Yavornytsky National Historical Museum of Dnipro. In 1938, he graduated from Oles Honchar Dnipro National University within the Department of Physics and Mathematics, and he then joined the CPSU in 1940.

After graduation, he worked variously as a teacher, school director, and deputy head of studies. Upon the outbreak of World War II, he served on the front lines as part of the Red Army. Upon returning to Ukraine, he became Deputy Head then later head of the Department of Education for the Dnipropetrovsk City Executive Committee. He did this until 1948, when he started doing part work uncluding being Second Secretary of the Zhovtnevyi District of Dnipropetrovsk, First Secretary of the Nikopol District of Dnipropetrovsk, and then finally Head of the Party Organs Department of the Dnipropetrovsk Oblast Committee. He was then promoted to party leadership roles in 1954, when he became Secretary of the Dnipropetrovsk Oblast Party Committee. In 1955 he was appointed Second Secretary for Dnipropetrovsk Oblast, which he did until 1959 when he became First Secretary of the Khmelnytskyi Regional Committee.

He was then transferred over to be First Secretary of the Cherkasy Regional Committee. Finally, from 1965 to 1976, he served as First Secretary of the Dnipropetrovsk Regional Committee. During this time, he was an advocate for policies involving Russification.

Political offices
Preceded by Ivan Hrushetsky	Chairman of the Presidium of the Supreme Soviet of the Ukrainian SSR; 1976-1984	Succeeded by Valentyna Shevchenko
