= Leonid Korniyets =

Ukrainian Soviet politician (1901–1969)

- Леонід Корнієць

Chairman of the All-Ukrainian Central Executive Committee
- In office March 1938 – 25 July 1938
- Preceded by: Grigory Petrovsky
- Succeeded by: position transformed

Chairman of the Presidium of the Supreme Soviet of Ukraine
- In office 27 July 1938 – 28 July 1939
- Preceded by: position created
- Succeeded by: Mykhailo Hrechukha

7th Chairman of the Council of People's Commissars of the Ukrainian SSR
- In office 6 August 1939 – 16 February 1944
- Preceded by: Demyan Korotchenko
- Succeeded by: Nikita Khrushchev

Personal details
- Born: 21 August 1901 Bobrynets, Yelisavetgradsky Uyezd, Kherson Governorate, Russian Empire
- Died: 29 May 1969 (aged 67) Moscow, RSFSR, Soviet Union
- Party: CPSU (1926–1969)
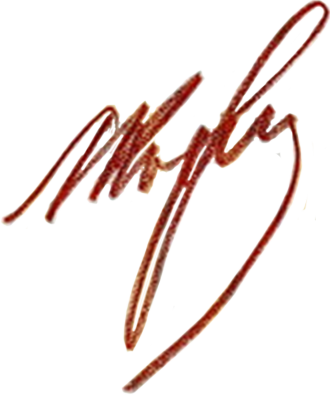
- Signature

Leonid Romanovych Korniyets (Ukrainian: Леонід Романович Корнієць; 21 August 1901 – 29 May 1969) was a Ukrainian and Soviet politician, who served as the head of government of Ukrainian SSR (today's equivalent of prime-minister) from 1939 to 1944.

== Early life ==
Leonid Korniyets was born on 21 August 1908 in the village of Bobrynets that today is in Kirovohrad Oblast, central Ukraine into a landless labourer's family. After graduating from a workers' faculty (rabfak), he completed his higher studies at the Kharkiv Institute of National Economy. For the next few years until he entered politics, he worked in industriial administration, economic planning, and in some managerial positions.

== Political career ==
After joining the Communist Party of Ukraine (CP(b)U) in 1926. Starting in 1931, he started to held some senior party positions including People’s Commissariat of Light Industry of the Ukrainian SSR and positions within the Council of People’s Commissars (RNK) of the Ukrainian SSR. In 1938, he held the post of Second Secretary of the Dnipropetrovsk Regional Committee of the CP(b)U. Then, from 1938 to 1939, he served as Chairman of the Presidium of the Supreme Soviet of the Ukrainian SSR. Finally, from 1939 to 1944, he was the 7th Chairman of the Council of People's Commissars of the Ukrainian SSR. During World War II, he served as a leader in the Ukrainian partisan movement, and served as a member of military councils on several fronts, achieving the rank of lieutenant general.

In 1944, he was appointed First Deputy Chairman of the Council of People’s Commissars of the Ukrainian SSR, until 1946 when he was appointed First Deputy Chairman of the Council of Ministers of the Ukrainian SSR. In 1950, he was promoted to Deputy Chairman, which he served as until 1953. He was then Minister of Procurement of the USSR, which in 1956 was renamed to Minister of Grain Products.

Political offices
Preceded by position created	Chairman of the Presidium of the Supreme Soviet of the Ukrainian SSR; 1938-1939	Succeeded by Mykhailo Hrechukha
Preceded by Demyan Korotchenko	Prime Minister of Ukraine (Ukrainian SSR); 1939–1944	Succeeded by Nikita Khrushchev
