= Anatoly Kuzmin (politician, born 1903) =

Soviet metallurgist (1903–1974)

- Анатолий Кузьмин

Minister of Ferrous Metallurgy of USSR
- In office 8 February 1954 – 28 October 1954
- Preceded by: Position reestablished
- Succeeded by: Alexander Sheremetyev

Minister of Metallurgy Industry of USSR
- In office 13 June 1949 – 28 December 1950
- Preceded by: Ivan Tevosian
- Succeeded by: Position abolished

Personal details
- Born: 20 November 1903 Tver, Russian Empire
- Died: 28 October 1954 (aged 50) Moscow, Russian SFSR, Soviet Union
- Resting place: Kremlin Wall Necropolis
- Citizenship: Soviet Union
- Party: CPSU (1926–1954)
- Occupation: Metallurgist, Politician
- Awards: 4 Orders of Lenin, 2 Orders of the Red Banner of Labour, Order of the Badge of Honour

Anatoly Nikolayevich Kuzmin (20 November 1903 – 28 October 1954) was a Soviet politician and metallurgist who oversaw the Soviet Union's Metallurgy Industry in the 1950s until his death in 1954. He was buried at the Kremlin Wall Necropolis

== Biography ==
Kuzmin was born on 28 October 1903 in Tver, Russian Empire into a working class family. In July 1948, he was appointed as the First Deputy Minister of Metallurgy Industry of the Soviet Union until his promotion as the minister in June 1949. He was also the First Deputy Minister of Ferrous Metallurgy of the Soviet Union from January 1951 to March 1953.

== Death and awards ==
Kuzmin died from natural causes in Moscow at the age of 50, he was given a state funeral and was buried at the Kremlin Wall Necropolis. He was awarded numerous awards including 4 Orders of Lenin.
