= Ministry of Ferrous Metallurgy =

Government ministry of the Soviet Union

The Ministry of Ferrous Metallurgy (Minchermet; Russian: Министерство чёрной металлургии СССР) had been a government ministry in the Soviet Union.

== History ==
The all-union commissariat of Ferrous Metallurgy was established on 24 January 1939 by ukase of the Presidium, Supreme Soviet USSR, at which time the All-Union People's Commissariat of Heavy Industry was subdivided into six separate commissariats. The Commissariat of Ferrous Metallurgy was to have under its jurisdiction all plants of the metallurgical industry, plants for high-quality steel and ferroalloys, pipe-rolling and pipe-casting plants, mining enterprises, enterprises of the refractories industry, coke and chemical byproducts plants, and enterprises for the processing and sale of ferrous metal scrap.

By decree of the Supreme Soviet USSR dated 15 March 1946, all people's commissariats were transformed into ministries. These included the Ministry of Ferrous Metallurgy and the Ministry of Nonferrous Metallurgy.

Both of these ministries were united on 29 July 1948, when the Ministry of Metallurgical Industry USSR was formed by ukase of the Presidium, Supreme Soviet USSR.

On 28 December 1950, the Ministry of Metallurgical Industry USSR was again divided into the Ministries of Ferrous Metallurgy and Nonferrous Metallurgy.

Ivan Fedorovich Tevosyan was appointed Minister of Ferrous Metallurgy USSR on 28 December 1950. He had held the same position before the merger of the two ministries on 29 July 1948. Anatoliy Nikolayevich Kuzmin was appointed First Deputy Minister of Ferrous Metallurgy on 28 December 1950. He had been Minister of Metallurgical Industry from July 1949 to December 1950.

== List of ministers ==
- Fjodor Merkulov (24.1.1939 - 17.4.1940)
- Ivan Tervosyan (17.4.1940 - 29.7.1948; 28.12.1950 - 6.3.1953)
- Anatoly Kuzmin (8.2.1954 - 27.4.1954)
- Aleksandr Sherementjev (15.11.1954 - 10.5.1957)
- Ivan Kazanets (2.10.1965 - 26.7.1974)
