= Valentyna Shevchenko (politician) =

Ukrainian politician (1935–2020)

- Валентина Шевченко

Chairman of the Presidium of the Supreme Soviet of the Ukrainian SSR
- In office 22 November 1984 – 1990
- First Secretary: Volodymyr Shcherbytsky
- Preceded by: Oleksiy Vatchenko
- Succeeded by: Vladimir Ivashko

Personal details
- Born: 12 March 1935 Kryvyi Rih, Ukrainian SSR, Soviet Union (now Ukraine)
- Died: 3 February 2020 (aged 84)
- Party: Communist Party of the Soviet Union
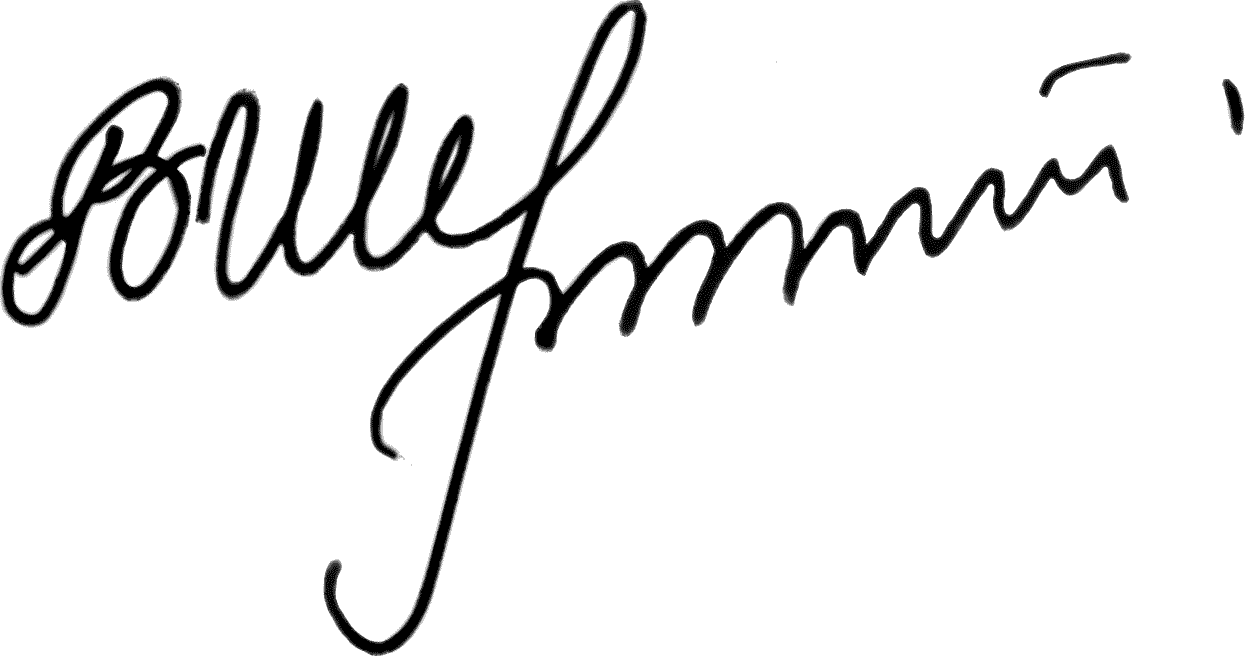
- Signature

Valentyna Semenivna Shevchenko (Ukrainian: Валентина Семенівна Шевченко; 12 March 1935 – 3 February 2020) was the Chairperson of the Presidium of the Supreme Soviet of the Ukrainian SSR.

== Biography ==
Shevchenko was born the daughter of a miner, Semen Solianyk, in Kryvyi Rih, Dnipropetrovsk Oblast, Soviet Union. In 1960, she started working as Secretary of the Dzerzhinsky District within Kryvyi Rih, which she did until 1962. She then worked as secretary and later head of the Department of the Central Committee for the Komsomol of Ukraine, and then up until 1972 was Deputy Minister of Education of the Ukrainian SSR. From 1972 to 1975 she served as Chair of the Presidium of the Ukrainian Society for Bilateral Relations. In 1972, she became a Candidate of Pedagogical Sciences.

From 1975 to 1985, Shevchenko was deputy chairperson of the Supreme Council Presidium of the Ukrainian SSR. After the death of Oleksiy Vatchenko, she began acting as the chairwoman until her official appointment on petition of Volodymyr Shcherbytsky. As she later stated, it came as a shock since the role tended to go to elderly male members.

In 1989 Shevchenko refused to sign prohibition against the People's Movement of Ukraine, as she stated it violated the constitution. She soon after announced she would retire from politics afterwards.

From September 1997 on she was the honorary president of the National Fund of social defence of mothers and children: "Ukraine – children". Also, from 2002, she was Head of the Congress of Business Women of Ukraine.

Shevchenko died on 3 February 2020 at the age of 84. It had been known she was ill since at least 2017, when she attended the funeral of Borys Oliynyk a noted poet and later Communist politician.

Political offices
Preceded by Oleksiy Vatchenko	Chairman of the Presidium of the Supreme Soviet of the Ukrainian SSR; 1984–1990	Succeeded by Vladimir Ivashko
