= Anatoly Kuzmin (politician, born 1859) =

Russian politician (1859–after 1912)

Anatoly Kuzmin Russian: Анатолий Кузьмин
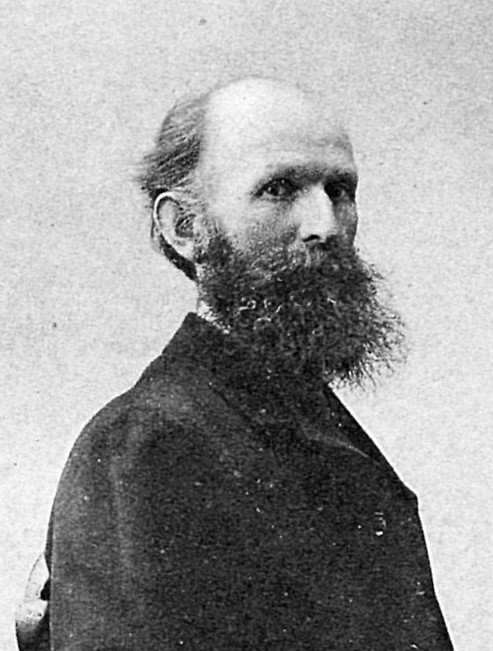
- 1910 photo of Kuzmin

Deputy of the Third Imperial Duma
- In office 1 November 1907 – 9 June 1912
- Monarch: Nicholas II

Personal details
- Born: Anatoly Arsenievich Kuzmin; 18 November 1859 Russian Empire
- Died: after 1912
- Party: right

Anatoly Arsenievich Kuzmin (Russian: Анато́лий Арсе́ньевич Кузьми́н; November 18, 1859 – after 1912) was a zemstvo clerk (zemskiy nachalnik), a chairman of an uyezd congress and a deputy of the Third Imperial Duma from the Vologda Governorate between 1907 and 1912. In the Duma he was a member of the Right faction; he was also a member of the local self-government commission, the judiciary reform commission and the peasant commission.

== Literature ==
- Šelochaev, Valentin Valentinovič, ed. (2008). Gosudarstvennaja Duma Rossijskoj Imperii 1906 - 1917: ėnciklopedija. Moskva: Rossijskaja Polit. Ėnciklopedija. ISBN 978-5-8243-1031-3.
- Кузьмин (in Russian) // Члены Государственной Думы (портреты и биографии). Третий созыв. 1907—1912 гг. / Сост. М. М. Боиович. — Москва, 1913. — P. 36. — 526 p.
