= Oleksiy Makukhin =

Ukrainian film producer (born 1980)

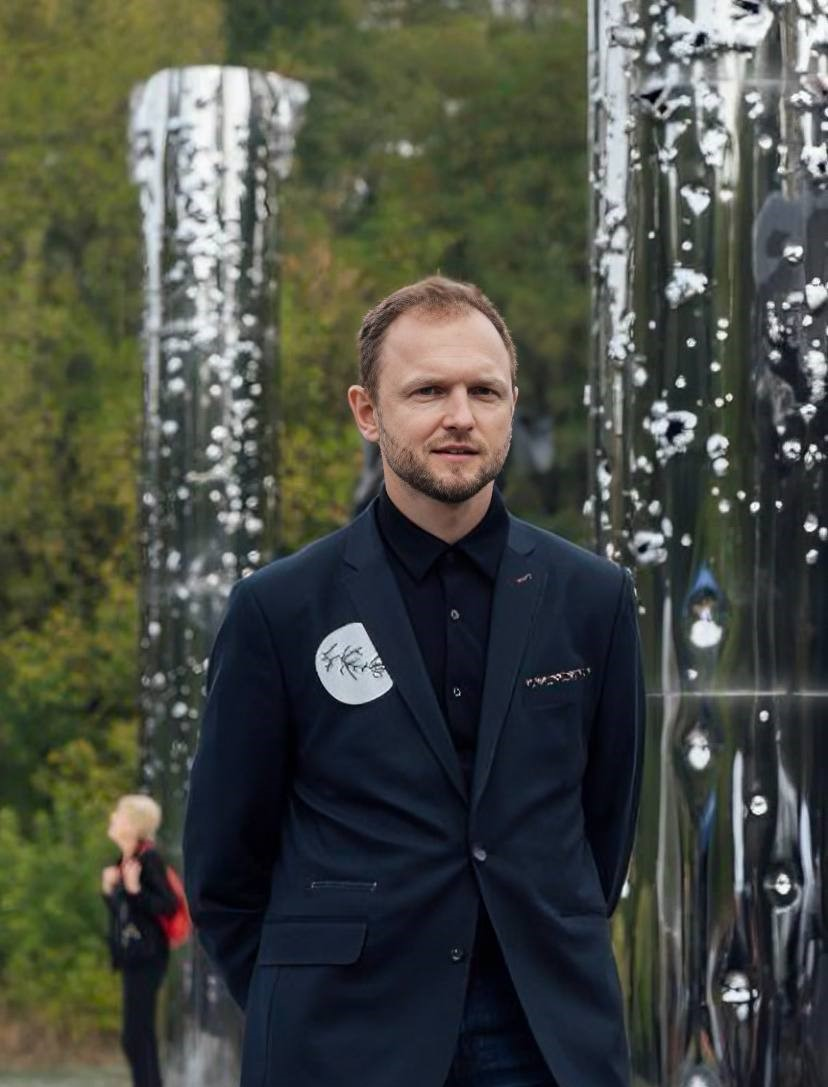
- Oleksiy Makukhin
- Born: Макухін Олексій Олександрович; 29 October 1980 (age 45); Kyiv, Ukraine
- Occupation: film producer

Oleksiy Makukhin (Ukrainian: Макухін Олексій Олександрович; born 29 October 1980) is a Ukrainian producer, media manager, and public activist who serves as the general director of the Babyn Yar Holocaust Memorial Center. Co-founder of Ukrainian cinema platform I Am Ukrainian.

== Early life and education ==
Oleksiy Makukhin was born in Kyiv on 29 October 1980 in the family of a philologist and a nuclear power plant engineer. Oleksiy's grandfather, Oleksiy Makukhin, was the Minister of Energy and Electrification of the Ukrainian SSR.

In 2011, he became a finalist in Waldemar Dziki's course on producing.

He studied at the Institute of International Relations of Taras Shevchenko National University of Kyiv. He graduated with a bachelor's and master's degree in public relations. In 2012, he completed a film production course at the New York Film Academy (LA/Universal Studios).

In the fall of 2015, he graduated from the Leadership in Strategic Communications program of the State Department in Washington.

== Career ==
From 2002 to 2010, Oleksiy Makukhin worked in advertising and communications for international brands in Ukraine. In particular, he worked as a media manager at international advertising agencies BBDO and Initiative. As Head of Communications, he was responsible for the launch of Beeline Ukraine, a mobile communications brand in Ukraine. The communication campaigns received the Golden Effie Award in 2007 and the Silver Effie Award in 2008.

From 2010 to 2014, he worked at 1+1 TV media group. First as a marketing manager, then as a producer of TV series and feature films. In 2014, under the influence of the Revolution of Dignity, he joined the reform team of Ukraine Crisis Media Centre (UCMC).

From 2015 to 2017, as a part of UCMC, he was a public relations advisor to the Minister of Defence. During this period, he produced three military documentaries, such as "Airport. That Day", "Raid", "Debaltseve". At the same time, he was the launch manager and producer of the first military radio station Army FM.

In 2018, Oleksiy became the first director of the Hybrid Warfare Analytical Group. This research unit analyzed Russian disinformation and propaganda based on big data collected from open sources of Russian media. Oleksiy was one of the authors of the study "Image of European Countries on Russian TV."

Since 2020, Oleksiy has been the chief producer of artistic projects at the Babyn Yar International Holocaust Centre.

He led the creation of the Symbolic Synagogue in Babyn Yar, the audiovisual installation Mirror Field, and the Crystal Wailing Wall by artist Maryna Abramovich.

In 2023, he was appointed as a general director of the Babyn Yar International Holocaust Center. In the same year, on behalf of the Babyn Yar, Oleksiy received the Thomas J. Dodd Prize in International Justice and Human Rights.

He was the general producer of the ceremony commemorating the 80th anniversary of the victims of Babyn Yar, with the participation of the presidents of Ukraine, Israel, and Germany, as well as the solemn concert of Deutsches Symphonie-Orchester Berlin. The event took place directly in Babyn Yar.

In 2023, together with Oleg Kokhan, Oleksiy Makukhin produced the anthology film War Through the Eyes of Animals, which featured American actor Sean Penn. At the same year, Makukhin was also one of the producers of the documentary film Defiant, directed by American filmmaker Kareem Amer, which premiered at the TIFF in Toronto in September 2023.
