= Nikifor Kalchenko =

Ukrainian and Soviet politician (1906–1989)

Nykyfor Kalchenko
- Никифор Кальченко
- Born: 27 January 1906; Poltava Governorate, Russian Empire
- Died: 14 May 1989 (aged 83); Kiev, Ukrainian SSR, Soviet Union
- Occupation: Politician
- Known for: Chairman of the Council of Ministers of the Ukrainian SSR

Nykyfor Tymofiyovych Kalchenko (Ukrainian: Никифор Тимофійович Кальченко; 9 February [O.S. 27 January] 1906 – 14 May 1989) was a Ukrainian and Soviet politician, who served as the chairman of the Council of Ministers of the Ukrainian SSR (equivalent of today's prime-minister).

== Early life ==
Nykyfor Kalchenko was born on 9 February (27 January O.S.) 1906 into a peasant family in the small village of Koshmanovka in Poltava Governorate (now Poltava Oblast). In 1921, he started studying at the Poltava School of Horticulture, from which he graduated from in 1924. After graduating, he worked as an authorized representative of the agricultural workers' union, before returning to studying, this time at the Poltava Agricultural Institute. In 1928, he graduated from there too, and he then became an agronomist-instructor for the union of the collective farm for Konotop. A year later, he started worked as an agronomist for the Poltava Fruit Cooperative Union, which he did until 1930.

In December 1930 he was appointed Deputy Head of the Poltava District Cooperative Union and as later manager of the "Soyuznasinnyk" seed office within Poltava. In 1935, he became Director of the Kononivka Machine-Tractor Station (MTS), which was located in Kharkiv. He was then, in 1937, appointed head of a department within the Kharkiv Land Office, and then in 19388 as Chairman of the Odesa Regional Executive Committee.

== World War II ==
Kalchenko served extensively as a member of military councils during World War II. First, he was appointed to the 56th Army, then the 16th Army in June 1943, the Voronezh Front in August 1943 and then the 1st Ukrainian Front in October 1943 whhen the Voronezh Front was renamed. By June 1945, he was promoted to a member of the Military Council for the Central Group of Forces.

== Political career ==
In May 1946, after the war, he was appointed Minister of Technical Crops of the Ukrainian SSR. For the next few years until 1950, he took on a variety of agricultural-related ministries within the Ukrainian SSR, finally becoming Minister of Agriculture of the Ukrainian SSR in April 1950. From May 1952 to January 1954 he was First Deputy Chairman of the Council of Ministers of the Ukrainian SSR, and then was promoted to Chairman in 1954, which he served as until 1961. He was appointed Deputy Chairman of the Council of Ministers of the Ukrainian SSR in March 1961, concurrently being Minister of Procurement, and then from 1962 to 1965 was First Deputy Chairman and Minister of Production.

== Awards ==
- Hero of Socialist Labour (February 6, 1976)
- 8 Orders of Lenin (February 7, 1939; May 29, 1945; January 23, 1948; February 8, 1956; February 26, 1958; February 8, 1966; December 8, 1973; February 6, 1976)
- Order of the October Revolution (August 27, 1971)
- Order of the Red Banner (April 6, 1945)
- 2 Orders of Bogdan Khmelnitsky, 1st class (May 29, 1944; July 29, 1944)
- Medal "For Labour Valour" (December 25, 1959)

Political offices
Preceded by Demyan Korotchenko	Prime Minister of Ukraine (Ukrainian SSR); 1954–1961	Succeeded by Volodymyr Shcherbytsky
