= Demyan Korotchenko =

Soviet Ukrainian politician (1894–1969)

- Дем'ян Коротченко
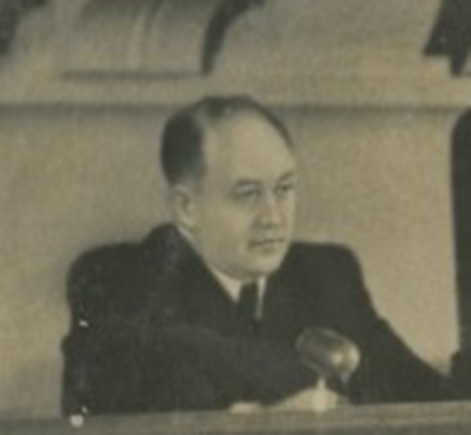
- Korotchenko in 1948

6th Chairman of the Council of Ministers of the Ukrainian Soviet Socialist Republic
- In office 4 March 1947 – 15 January 1954
- Preceded by: Nikita Khrushchev
- Succeeded by: Nikifor Kalchenko
- In office 21 February 1938 – 6 August 1939
- Preceded by: Mykola Marchak
- Succeeded by: Leonid Korniyets

Chairman of the Presidium of the Supreme Soviet of the Ukrainian Soviet Socialist Republic
- In office 15 January 1954 – 7 April 1969
- Preceded by: Mykhailo Hrechukha
- Succeeded by: Oleksandr Lyashko

Full member of the 19th Presidium
- In office 16 October 1952 – 6 March 1953

Candidate member of the 20th Presidium
- In office 29 June 1957 – 17 October 1961

Personal details
- Born: 29 November 1894 Pohribky, Chernigov Governorate, Russian Empire
- Died: 7 April 1969 (aged 74) Kyiv, Ukrainian SSR, Soviet Union
- Party: Communist Party of the Soviet Union (1918–1969)
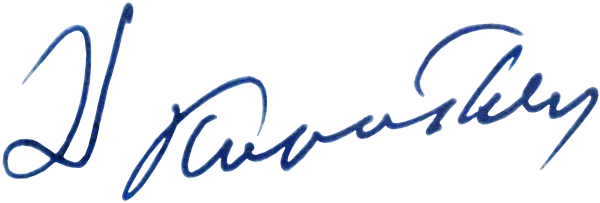
- Signature

Demyan (Demian) Serhiyovych Korotchenko (Note: Ukrainian: Дем'ян Сергійович Коротченко; Russian: Демья́н Серге́евич Коро́тченко, romanized: Demyan Sergeyevich Korotchenko) (29 November 1894 – 7 April 1969) was a Ukrainian Soviet politician who twice served as the head of government of the Ukrainian SSR (the equivalent of today's Prime Minister).

== Biography ==
Demyan Korotchenko was born in to a peasant family in a small village that today is in Sumy Oblast, eastern Ukraine. He joined the Russian Communist Party (b) in 1918 and became active in organising Red Army detachments. He was a minor party official in Ukraine during the 1920s, until 1928, when the boss of the Ukrainian communist party, Lazar Kaganovich, was recalled and put in charge of the Moscow party regional communist party, Korotchenko was also transferred to take a two course, before being made chairman of the local soviet in the Bauman district of Moscow, where Nikita Khrushchev was the district party secretary. In 1935, he succeeded Khrushchev as the district party secretary. He achieved rapid promotion during the Great Purge, becoming First Secretary of the communist party in the Western Oblast, based in Smolensk, after the previous first secretary had been arrested. In 1938, when Khrushchev took over as party boss in Ukraine, Korotchenko was appointed First Secretary of the Dnipropetrovsk regional party committee, and then Chairman of the Ukrainian Council of Ministers. He helped organise partisan resistance when Ukraine was under German occupation in 1941-44. In July 1946, he was appointed a secretary of the party, but reverted to his former post as head of the Ukrainian government in December 1947. From January 1954, he held the largely ceremonial post Chairman of the Ukrainian Supreme Soviet, ie 'President' of Ukraine until his death.

== Personality ==
Khrushchev's biographer, William Taubman, described Korotchenko as a "classic yes-man". Reportedly, "Silence was his trump card. He would wait until (Khrushchev) made some sort of proposal, and then say: "Yes, yes, of course, that's exactly right."

== Awards ==
- Hero of Socialist Labour (1964)
- Six Orders of Lenin
- Order of Suvorov, 1st class
- Order of the Patriotic War, 1st class

== Notes ==
Political offices
Preceded by Mykola Marchak	Prime Minister of Ukraine (Ukrainian SSR); 1938–1939	Succeeded by Leonid Korniyets
Preceded by Nikita Khrushchev	Prime Minister of Ukraine (Ukrainian SSR); 1947–1954	Succeeded by Nikifor Kalchenko
Preceded by Mykhailo Hrechukha	Chairman of the Presidium of the Supreme Soviet of the Ukrainian SSR; 1954-1969	Succeeded by Oleksandr Lyashko
