= Council of Ministers of the Ukrainian SSR =

Council of Ministers of the Ukrainian Soviet Socialist Republic (Ukrainian: Рада Міністрів УРСР, romanized: Rada Ministriv URSR) was the highest executive and administrative body of state power of the Ukrainian Soviet Socialist Republic, government (1946–1991). The council replaced the Council of People's Commissars that existed in Ukraine since the establishment of the Soviet regime. In April 1991, the council was replaced by the Cabinet of Ministers of the Ukrainian Soviet Socialist Republic which after adaptation of the Declaration of Independence of Ukraine was changed to Cabinet of Ministers of Ukraine.

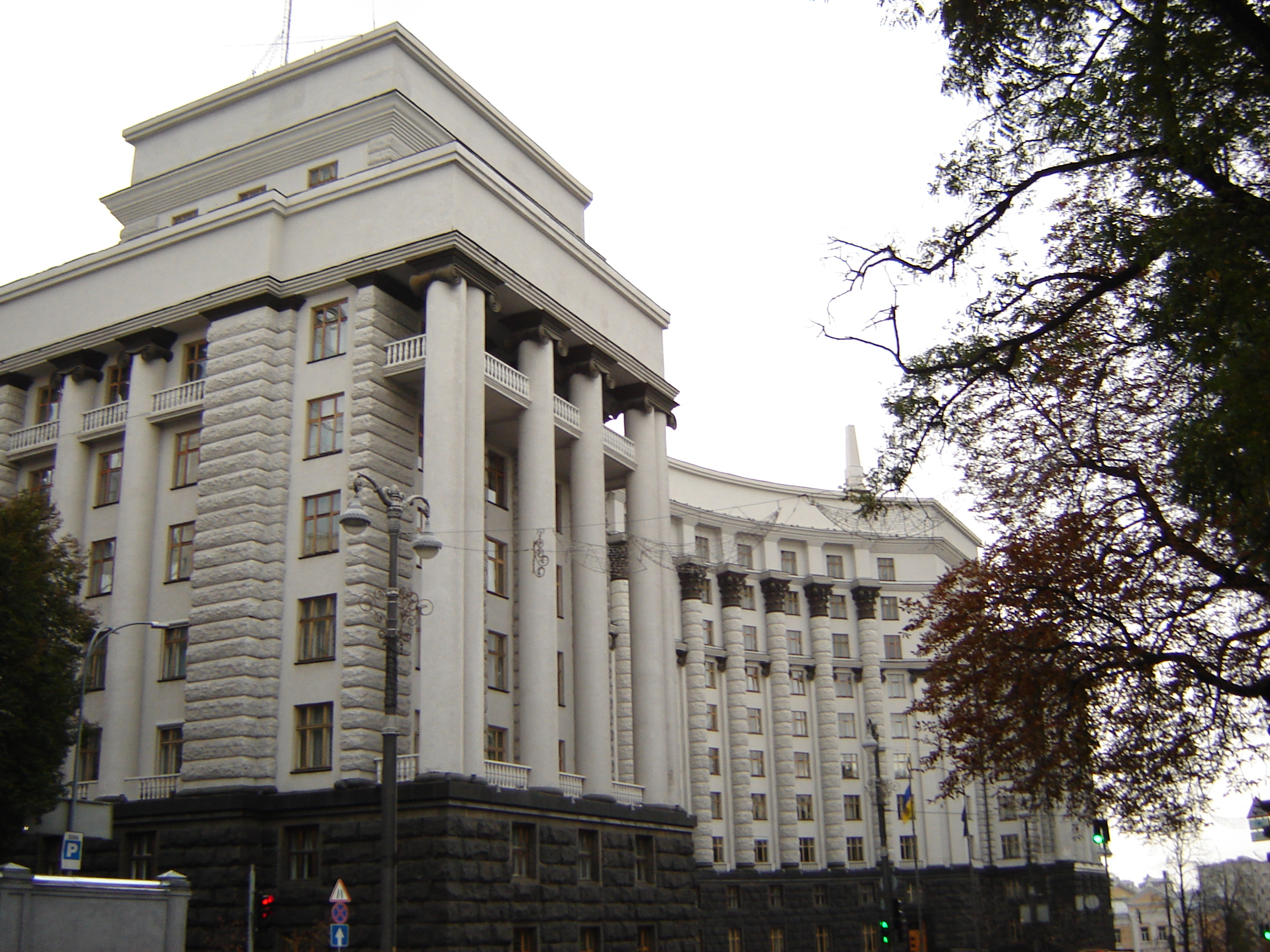
Government Building in Kiev

== List of governments ==
- Khrushchev Government
- Second Korotchenko Government
- First Kalchenko Government
- Second Kalchenko Government
- First Shcherbytsky Government
- Kazanets Government
- Second Shcherbytsky Government
- Third Shcherbytsky Government
- First Lyashko Government
- Second Lyashko Government
- Third Lyashko Government
- First Masol Government

== See also ==
- Ministries of the Ukrainian SSR
