= Regional Committee of the Communist Party of the Soviet Union =

Regional Committee of the Communist Party of the Soviet Union Областной комитет КПСС

Information
- Elected by: Regional Conference of the Communist Party of the Soviet Union
- Responsible to: Central Committee of the Communist Party of the Soviet Union
- Parent: Communist Party of the Soviet Union

Regional Committees of the Communist Party of the Soviet Union were regional branches of the Communist Party of the Soviet Union which usually encompassed a region, oblast, krai, or Autonomous Soviet Socialist Republic. Regional Committees were elected by their Regional Conferences. Until June 1990, the Russian Soviet Federative Socialist Republic was the only union republic where the Regional Committees were responsible directly to the Communist Party of the Soviet Union instead of their respective republican branch of the Communist Party of the Soviet Union. Similarly, cities had City Committees of the Communist Party of the Soviet Union.

== History ==
In 1919, the previous committees of the Russian Communist Party (Bolsheviks) were replaced by provincial organizations of the Russian Communist Party (Bolsheviks), during the reform of the administrative-territorial division. Provincial organizations were reorganized into regional committees.

== Organization ==
Each regional committee was responsible to the Central Committee of the Communist Party of their republic. In the case of the Russian Soviet Federative Socialist Republic, every regional committee within the RSFSR was directly responsible to the Central Committee of the Communist Party of the Soviet Union. The First Secretary was the highest official within a regional committee and was elected by their regional committee. The Charter of the Communist Party of the Soviet Union from 1972 states how regional committees and republican branches of the Communist Party of the Soviet Union are to be managed.

Governing bodies of republican, regional and regional organizations of the party

43. The supreme body of a regional, provincial, republican party organization is the regional, provincial party conference or congress of the Communist Party of the Union Republic, and in the interval between them - the regional committee, regional committee, and the Central Committee of the Communist Party of the Union Republic.

45. Regional, regional committees, and the Central Committee of the Communist Parties of the Union Republics elect bureaus, including committee secretaries. Party secretaries must be at least five years old. Chairmen of party commissions, heads of departments of these committees, editors of party newspapers and magazines are also approved at plenary committees. Secretariats may be created to consider current issues and verify compliance with the regional, party, and regional committees of the Communist Parties of the Union republics.

46. The plenary session of the regional, regional committee, and the Central Committee of the Communist Party of the Union Republic is convened at least once every four months.

== List of Regional Committees ==
This is a list of Regional Committees of the Communist Party of the Soviet Union in August 1991.

=== Russian Soviet Federative Socialist Republic - Communist Party of the Russian SFSR ===
Regional Committees of Oblasts

Regional Committee	Oblast	Republic
Regional Committees of Oblasts in the RSFSR
Amur Regional Committee of the Communist Party of the Soviet Union	Amur Oblast	(Russian Soviet Federative Socialist Republic) RSFSR
Arkhangelsk Regional Committee of the Communist Party of the Soviet Union	Arkhangelsk Oblast	(Russian Soviet Federative Socialist Republic) RSFSR
Astrakhan Regional Committee of the Communist Party of the Soviet Union	Astrakhan Oblast	(Russian Soviet Federative Socialist Republic) RSFSR
Belgorod Regional Committee of the Communist Party of the Soviet Union	Belgorod Oblast	(Russian Soviet Federative Socialist Republic) RSFSR
Bryansk Regional Committee of the Communist Party of the Soviet Union	Bryansk Oblast	(Russian Soviet Federative Socialist Republic) RSFSR
Chelyabinsk Regional Committee of the Communist Party of the Soviet Union	Chelyabinsk Oblast	(Russian Soviet Federative Socialist Republic) RSFSR
Chita Regional Committee of the Communist Party of the Soviet Union	Chita Oblast	(Russian Soviet Federative Socialist Republic) RSFSR
Ivanovo Regional Committee of the Communist Party of the Soviet Union	Ivanovo Oblast	(Russian Soviet Federative Socialist Republic) RSFSR
Irkutsk Regional Committee of the Communist Party of the Soviet Union	Irkutsk Oblast	(Russian Soviet Federative Socialist Republic) RSFSR
Kaliningrad Regional Committee of the Communist Party of the Soviet Union	Kaliningrad Oblast	(Russian Soviet Federative Socialist Republic) RSFSR
Kaluga Regional Committee of the Communist Party of the Soviet Union	Kaluga Oblast	(Russian Soviet Federative Socialist Republic) RSFSR
Kamchatka Regional Committee of the Communist Party of the Soviet Union	Kamchatka Oblast	(Russian Soviet Federative Socialist Republic) RSFSR
Kemerovo Regional Committee of the Communist Party of the Soviet Union	Kemerovo Oblast	(Russian Soviet Federative Socialist Republic) RSFSR
Kirov Regional Committee of the Communist Party of the Soviet Union	Kirov Oblast	(Russian Soviet Federative Socialist Republic) RSFSR
Kostroma Regional Committee of the Communist Party of the Soviet Union	Kostroma Oblast	(Russian Soviet Federative Socialist Republic) RSFSR
Kuibyshev Regional Committee of the Communist Party of the Soviet Union	Kuibyshev Oblast	(Russian Soviet Federative Socialist Republic) RSFSR
Kurgan Regional Committee of the Communist Party of the Soviet Union	Kurgan Oblast	(Russian Soviet Federative Socialist Republic) RSFSR
Kursk Regional Committee of the Communist Party of the Soviet Union	Kursk Oblast	(Russian Soviet Federative Socialist Republic) RSFSR
Leningrad Regional Committee of the Communist Party of the Soviet Union	Leningrad Oblast	(Russian Soviet Federative Socialist Republic) RSFSR
Lipetsk Regional Committee of the Communist Party of the Soviet Union	Lipetsk Oblast	(Russian Soviet Federative Socialist Republic) RSFSR
Magadan Regional Committee of the Communist Party of the Soviet Union	Magadan Oblast	(Russian Soviet Federative Socialist Republic) RSFSR
Moscow Regional Committee of the Communist Party of the Soviet Union	Moscow Oblast	(Russian Soviet Federative Socialist Republic) RSFSR
Murmansk Regional Committee of the Communist Party of the Soviet Union	Murmansk Oblast	(Russian Soviet Federative Socialist Republic) RSFSR
Nizhny Novgorod Regional Committee of the Communist Party of the Soviet Union	Nizhny Novgorod Oblast	(Russian Soviet Federative Socialist Republic) RSFSR
Novgorod Regional Committee of the Communist Party of the Soviet Union	Novgorod Oblast	(Russian Soviet Federative Socialist Republic) RSFSR
Novosibirsk Regional Committee of the Communist Party of the Soviet Union	Novosibirsk Oblast	(Russian Soviet Federative Socialist Republic) RSFSR
Omsk Regional Committee of the Communist Party of the Soviet Union	Omsk Oblast	(Russian Soviet Federative Socialist Republic) RSFSR
Orenburg Regional Committee of the Communist Party of the Soviet Union	Orenburg Oblast	(Russian Soviet Federative Socialist Republic) RSFSR
Oryol Regional Committee of the Communist Party of the Soviet Union	Oryol Oblast	(Russian Soviet Federative Socialist Republic) RSFSR
Penza Regional Committee of the Communist Party of the Soviet Union	Penza Oblast	(Russian Soviet Federative Socialist Republic) RSFSR
Perm Regional Committee of the Communist Party of the Soviet Union	Perm Oblast	(Russian Soviet Federative Socialist Republic) RSFSR
Pskov Regional Committee of the Communist Party of the Soviet Union	Pskov Oblast	(Russian Soviet Federative Socialist Republic) RSFSR
Rostov Regional Committee of the Communist Party of the Soviet Union	Rostov Oblast	(Russian Soviet Federative Socialist Republic) RSFSR
Ryazan Regional Committee of the Communist Party of the Soviet Union	Ryazan Oblast	(Russian Soviet Federative Socialist Republic) RSFSR
Sakhalin Regional Committee of the Communist Party of the Soviet Union	Sakhalin Oblast	(Russian Soviet Federative Socialist Republic) RSFSR
Saratov Regional Committee of the Communist Party of the Soviet Union	Saratov Oblast	(Russian Soviet Federative Socialist Republic) RSFSR
Smolensk Regional Committee of the Communist Party of the Soviet Union	Smolensk Oblast	(Russian Soviet Federative Socialist Republic) RSFSR
Sverdlovsk Regional Committee of the Communist Party of the Soviet Union	Sverdlovsk Oblast	(Russian Soviet Federative Socialist Republic) RSFSR
Tambov Regional Committee of the Communist Party of the Soviet Union	Tambov Oblast	(Russian Soviet Federative Socialist Republic) RSFSR
Tomsk Regional Committee of the Communist Party of the Soviet Union	Tomsk Oblast	(Russian Soviet Federative Socialist Republic) RSFSR
Tula Regional Committee of the Communist Party of the Soviet Union	Tula Oblast	(Russian Soviet Federative Socialist Republic) RSFSR
Tver Regional Committee of the Communist Party of the Soviet Union	Tver Oblast	(Russian Soviet Federative Socialist Republic) RSFSR
Tyumen Regional Committee of the Communist Party of the Soviet Union	Tyumen Oblast	(Russian Soviet Federative Socialist Republic) RSFSR
Ulyanovsk Regional Committee of the Communist Party of the Soviet Union	Ulyanovsk Oblast	(Russian Soviet Federative Socialist Republic) RSFSR
Vladimir Regional Committee of the Communist Party of the Soviet Union	Vladimir Oblast	(Russian Soviet Federative Socialist Republic) RSFSR
Volgograd Regional Committee of the Communist Party of the Soviet Union	Volgograd Oblast	(Russian Soviet Federative Socialist Republic) RSFSR
Vologda Regional Committee of the Communist Party of the Soviet Union	Vologda Oblast	(Russian Soviet Federative Socialist Republic) RSFSR
Voronezh Regional Committee of the Communist Party of the Soviet Union	Voronezh Oblast	(Russian Soviet Federative Socialist Republic) RSFSR
Yaroslavl Regional Committee of the Communist Party of the Soviet Union	Yaroslavl Oblast	(Russian Soviet Federative Socialist Republic) RSFSR

Regional Committees of Autonomous Oblasts

Regional Committee	Autonomous Oblast	Republic
Regional Committees of Autonomous Oblasts in the RSFSR
Adygea Regional Committee of the Communist Party of the Soviet Union	Adygea Autonomous Oblast	(Russian Soviet Federative Socialist Republic) RSFSR
Gorno-Altai Regional Committee of the Communist Party of the Soviet Union	Gorno-Altai Autonomous Oblast	(Russian Soviet Federative Socialist Republic) RSFSR
Karachay-Cherkess Regional Committee of the Communist Party of the Soviet Union	Karachay-Cherkess Autonomous Oblast	(Russian Soviet Federative Socialist Republic) RSFSR
Khakassian Regional Committee of the Communist Party of the Soviet Union	Khakass Autonomous Oblast	(Russian Soviet Federative Socialist Republic) RSFSR
Jewish Regional Committee of the Communist Party of the Soviet Union	Jewish Autonomous Oblast	(Russian Soviet Federative Socialist Republic) RSFSR

Regional Committees of Krais

Regional Committee	Krai	Republic
Regional Committees of Krais in the RSFSR
Altai Regional Committee of the Communist Party of the Soviet Union	Altai Krai	(Russian Soviet Federative Socialist Republic) RSFSR
Khabarovsk Regional Committee of the Communist Party of the Soviet Union	Khabarovsk Krai	(Russian Soviet Federative Socialist Republic) RSFSR
Krasnodar Regional Committee of the Communist Party of the Soviet Union	Krasnodar Krai	(Russian Soviet Federative Socialist Republic) RSFSR
Krasnoyarsk Regional Committee of the Communist Party of the Soviet Union	Krasnoyarsk Krai	(Russian Soviet Federative Socialist Republic) RSFSR
Primorsky Regional Committee of the Communist Party of the Soviet Union	Primorsky Krai	(Russian Soviet Federative Socialist Republic) RSFSR
Stavropol Regional Committee of the Communist Party of the Soviet Union	Stavropol Krai	(Russian Soviet Federative Socialist Republic) RSFSR

Regional Committees of Autonomous Soviet Socialist Republics

Regional Committee	ASSR	Republic
Regional Committees of ASSRs in the RSFSR
Bashkir Regional Committee of the Communist Party of the Soviet Union	Bashkir ASSR	(Russian Soviet Federative Socialist Republic) RSFSR
Buryat Regional Committee of the Communist Party of the Soviet Union	Buryat ASSR	(Russian Soviet Federative Socialist Republic) RSFSR
Chechen-Ingush Regional Committee of the Communist Party of the Soviet Union	Checheno-Ingush ASSR	(Russian Soviet Federative Socialist Republic) RSFSR
Chuvash Regional Committee of the Communist Party of the Soviet Union	Chuvash ASSR	(Russian Soviet Federative Socialist Republic) RSFSR
Dagestan Regional Committee of the Communist Party of the Soviet Union	Dagestan ASSR	(Russian Soviet Federative Socialist Republic) RSFSR
Kabardino-Balkarian Regional Committee of the Communist Party of the Soviet Union	Kabardino-Balkarian ASSR	(Russian Soviet Federative Socialist Republic) RSFSR
Kalmyk Regional Committee of the Communist Party of the Soviet Union	Kalmyk ASSR	(Russian Soviet Federative Socialist Republic) RSFSR
Karelian Regional Committee of the Communist Party of the Soviet Union	Karelian ASSR	(Russian Soviet Federative Socialist Republic) RSFSR
Komi Regional Committee of the Communist Party of the Soviet Union	Komi ASSR	(Russian Soviet Federative Socialist Republic) RSFSR
Mari Regional Committee of the Communist Party of the Soviet Union	Mari ASSR	(Russian Soviet Federative Socialist Republic) RSFSR
Mordovian Regional Committee of the Communist Party of the Soviet Union	Mordovian ASSR	(Russian Soviet Federative Socialist Republic) RSFSR
North Ossetian Regional Committee of the Communist Party of the Soviet Union	North Ossetian ASSR	(Russian Soviet Federative Socialist Republic) RSFSR
Tatarstan Regional Committee of the Communist Party of the Soviet Union	Tatar ASSR	(Russian Soviet Federative Socialist Republic) RSFSR
Tuvan Regional Committee of the Communist Party of the Soviet Union	Tuvan ASSR	(Russian Soviet Federative Socialist Republic) RSFSR
Udmurt Regional Committee of the Communist Party of the Soviet Union	Udmurt ASSR	(Russian Soviet Federative Socialist Republic) RSFSR
Yakut Regional Committee of the Communist Party of the Soviet Union	Yakut ASSR	(Russian Soviet Federative Socialist Republic) RSFSR

=== Azerbaijan Soviet Socialist Republic - Communist Party of the Azerbaijan SSR ===
Regional Committee	Area	Republic
Regional Committees of the Azerbaijan SSR
Nakhichevan Regional Committee of the Communist Party of the Soviet Union	Nakhichevan ASSR	(Azerbaijan Soviet Socialist Republic) Azerbaijan SSR
Nagorno-Karabakh Regional Committee of the Communist Party of the Soviet Union	Nagorno-Karabakh Autonomous Oblast	(Azerbaijan Soviet Socialist Republic) Azerbaijan SSR

=== Byelorussian Soviet Socialist Republic - Communist Party of the Byelorussian SSR ===
Regional Committee	Area	Republic
Regional Committees of the Byelorussian SSR
Brest Regional Committee of the Communist Party of the Soviet Union	Brest Oblast	(Byelorussian Soviet Socialist Republic) Byelorussian SSR
Gomel Regional Committee of the Communist Party of the Soviet Union	Gomel Oblast	(Byelorussian Soviet Socialist Republic) Byelorussian SSR
Grodno Regional Committee of the Communist Party of the Soviet Union	Grodno Oblast	(Byelorussian Soviet Socialist Republic) Byelorussian SSR
Vitebsk Regional Committee of the Communist Party of the Soviet Union	Vitebsk Oblast	(Byelorussian Soviet Socialist Republic) Byelorussian SSR
Minsk Regional Committee of the Communist Party of the Soviet Union	Minsk Oblast	(Byelorussian Soviet Socialist Republic) Byelorussian SSR
Mogilev Regional Committee of the Communist Party of the Soviet Union	Mogilev Oblast	(Byelorussian Soviet Socialist Republic) Byelorussian SSR

=== Georgian Soviet Socialist Republic - Communist Party of the Georgian SSR ===
Regional Committee	Area	Republic
Regional Committees of the Georgian SSR
Abkhaz Regional Committee of the Communist Party of the Soviet Union	Abkhaz ASSR	(Georgian Soviet Socialist Republic) Georgian SSR
Adjarian Regional Committee of the Communist Party of the Soviet Union	Adjarian ASSR	(Georgian Soviet Socialist Republic) Georgian SSR
South Ossetian Regional Committee of the Communist Party of the Soviet Union	South Ossetian Autonomous Oblast	(Georgian Soviet Socialist Republic) Georgian SSR

=== Kazakh Soviet Socialist Republic - Communist Party of the Kazakh SSR ===
Regional Committee	Area	Republic
Regional Committees of the Kazakh SSR
Aktobe Regional Committee of the Communist Party of the Soviet Union	Aktobe Oblast	(Kazakh Soviet Socialist Republic) Kazakh SSR
Alma-Ata Regional Committee of the Communist Party of the Soviet Union	Alma-Ata Oblast	(Kazakh Soviet Socialist Republic) Kazakh SSR
Dzhambul Regional Committee of the Communist Party of the Soviet Union	Dzhambul Oblast	(Kazakh Soviet Socialist Republic) Kazakh SSR
Dzhezkazgan Regional Committee of the Communist Party of the Soviet Union	Dzhezkazgan Oblast	(Kazakh Soviet Socialist Republic) Kazakh SSR
East Kazakhstan Regional Committee of the Communist Party of the Soviet Union	East Kazakhstan Oblast	(Kazakh Soviet Socialist Republic) Kazakh SSR
Guryev Regional Committee of the Communist Party of the Soviet Union	Guryev Oblast	(Kazakh Soviet Socialist Republic) Kazakh SSR
Karaganda Regional Committee of the Communist Party of the Soviet Union	Karaganda Oblast	(Kazakh Soviet Socialist Republic) Kazakh SSR
Kokchetav Regional Committee of the Communist Party of the Soviet Union	Kokchetav Oblast	(Kazakh Soviet Socialist Republic) Kazakh SSR
Kustanai Regional Committee of the Communist Party of the Soviet Union	Kustanai Oblast	(Kazakh Soviet Socialist Republic) Kazakh SSR
Kzyl-Orda Regional Committee of the Communist Party of the Soviet Union	Kzyl-Orda Oblast	(Kazakh Soviet Socialist Republic) Kazakh SSR
Mangistau Regional Committee of the Communist Party of the Soviet Union	Mangistau Oblast	(Kazakh Soviet Socialist Republic) Kazakh SSR
North Kazakhstan Regional Committee of the Communist Party of the Soviet Union	North Kazakhstan Oblast	(Kazakh Soviet Socialist Republic) Kazakh SSR
Pavlodar Regional Committee of the Communist Party of the Soviet Union	Pavlodar Oblast	(Kazakh Soviet Socialist Republic) Kazakh SSR
Semipalatinsk Regional Committee of the Communist Party of the Soviet Union	Semipalatinsk Oblast	(Kazakh Soviet Socialist Republic) Kazakh SSR
Taldy-Kurgan Regional Committee of the Communist Party of the Soviet Union	Taldy-Kurgan Oblast	(Kazakh Soviet Socialist Republic) Kazakh SSR
Tselinograd Regional Committee of the Communist Party of the Soviet Union	Tselinograd Oblast	(Kazakh Soviet Socialist Republic) Kazakh SSR
Turgai Regional Committee of the Communist Party of the Soviet Union	Turgai Oblast	(Kazakh Soviet Socialist Republic) Kazakh SSR
Ural Regional Committee of the Communist Party of the Soviet Union	Ural Oblast	(Kazakh Soviet Socialist Republic) Kazakh SSR

=== Kirghiz Soviet Socialist Republic - Communist Party of the Kirghiz SSR ===
Regional Committee	Area	Republic
Regional Committees of the Kirghiz SSR
Chui Regional Committee of the Communist Party of the Soviet Union	Chui Oblast	(Kirghiz Soviet Socialist Republic) Kirghiz SSR
Issyk-Kul Regional Committee of the Communist Party of the Soviet Union	Issyk-Kul Oblast	(Kirghiz Soviet Socialist Republic) Kirghiz SSR
Jalal-Abad Regional Committee of the Communist Party of the Soviet Union	Jalal-Abad Oblast	(Kirghiz Soviet Socialist Republic) Kirghiz SSR
Naryn Regional Committee of the Communist Party of the Soviet Union	Naryn Oblast	(Kirghiz Soviet Socialist Republic) Kirghiz SSR
Osh Regional Committee of the Communist Party of the Soviet Union	Osh Oblast	(Kirghiz Soviet Socialist Republic) Kirghiz SSR
Talas Regional Committee of the Communist Party of the Soviet Union	Talas Oblast	(Kirghiz Soviet Socialist Republic) Kirghiz SSR

=== Tajik Soviet Socialist Republic - Communist Party of the Tajik SSR ===
Regional Committee	Area	Republic
Regional Committees of the Tajik SSR
Gorno-Badakhshan Regional Committee of the Communist Party of the Soviet Union	Gorno-Badakhshan Autonomous Oblast	(Tajik Soviet Socialist Republic) Tajik SSR
Kulyab Regional Committee of the Communist Party of the Soviet Union	Kulyab Oblast	(Tajik Soviet Socialist Republic) Tajik SSR
Kurgan-Tyube Regional Committee of the Communist Party of the Soviet Union	Kurgan-Tyube Oblast	(Tajik Soviet Socialist Republic) Tajik SSR
Leninabad Regional Committee of the Communist Party of the Soviet Union	Leninabad Oblast	(Tajik Soviet Socialist Republic) Tajik SSR

=== Turkmen Soviet Socialist Republic - Communist Party of the Turkmen SSR ===
Regional Committee	Area	Republic
Regional Committees of the Turkmen SSR
Balkan Regional Committee of the Communist Party of the Soviet Union	Balkan Oblast	(Turkmen Soviet Socialist Republic) Turkmen SSR
Chardzhou Regional Committee of the Communist Party of the Soviet Union	Chardzhou Oblast	(Turkmen Soviet Socialist Republic) Turkmen SSR
Mary Regional Committee of the Communist Party of the Soviet Union	Mary Oblast	(Turkmen Soviet Socialist Republic) Turkmen SSR
Tashauz Regional Committee of the Communist Party of the Soviet Union	Tashauz Oblast	(Turkmen Soviet Socialist Republic) Turkmen SSR

=== Ukrainian Soviet Socialist Republic - Communist Party of the Ukrainian SSR ===
Regional Committee	Area	Republic
Regional Committees of the Ukrainian SSR
Cherkasy Regional Committee of the Communist Party of the Soviet Union	Cherkasy Oblast	(Ukrainian Soviet Socialist Republic) Ukrainian SSR
Chernihiv Regional Committee of the Communist Party of the Soviet Union	Chernihiv Oblast	(Ukrainian Soviet Socialist Republic) Ukrainian SSR
Chernivtsi Regional Committee of the Communist Party of the Soviet Union	Chernivtsi Oblast	(Ukrainian Soviet Socialist Republic) Ukrainian SSR
Crimean Regional Committee of the Communist Party of the Soviet Union	Crimean Oblast	(Ukrainian Soviet Socialist Republic) Ukrainian SSR
Dnipropetrovsk Regional Committee of the Communist Party of the Soviet Union	Dnipropetrovsk Oblast	(Ukrainian Soviet Socialist Republic) Ukrainian SSR
Donetsk Regional Committee of the Communist Party of the Soviet Union	Donetsk Oblast	(Ukrainian Soviet Socialist Republic) Ukrainian SSR
Ivano-Frankivsk Regional Committee of the Communist Party of the Soviet Union	Ivano-Frankivsk Oblast	(Ukrainian Soviet Socialist Republic) Ukrainian SSR
Kharkiv Regional Committee of the Communist Party of the Soviet Union	Kharkiv Oblast	(Ukrainian Soviet Socialist Republic) Ukrainian SSR
Kherson Regional Committee of the Communist Party of the Soviet Union	Kherson Oblast	(Ukrainian Soviet Socialist Republic) Ukrainian SSR
Khmelnitsky Regional Committee of the Communist Party of the Soviet Union	Khmelnitsky Oblast	(Ukrainian Soviet Socialist Republic) Ukrainian SSR
Kiev Regional Committee of the Communist Party of the Soviet Union	Kiev Oblast	(Ukrainian Soviet Socialist Republic) Ukrainian SSR
Kirovograd Regional Committee of the Communist Party of the Soviet Union	Kirovograd Oblast	(Ukrainian Soviet Socialist Republic) Ukrainian SSR
Lugansk Regional Committee of the Communist Party of the Soviet Union	Lugansk Oblast	(Ukrainian Soviet Socialist Republic) Ukrainian SSR
Lviv Regional Committee of the Communist Party of the Soviet Union	Lviv Oblast	(Ukrainian Soviet Socialist Republic) Ukrainian SSR
Mykolaiv Regional Committee of the Communist Party of the Soviet Union	Mykolaiv Oblast	(Ukrainian Soviet Socialist Republic) Ukrainian SSR
Odessa Regional Committee of the Communist Party of the Soviet Union	Odessa Oblast	(Ukrainian Soviet Socialist Republic) Ukrainian SSR
Poltava Regional Committee of the Communist Party of the Soviet Union	Poltava Oblast	(Ukrainian Soviet Socialist Republic) Ukrainian SSR
Rivne Regional Committee of the Communist Party of the Soviet Union	Rivne Oblast	(Ukrainian Soviet Socialist Republic) Ukrainian SSR
Sumy Regional Committee of the Communist Party of the Soviet Union	Sumy Oblast	(Ukrainian Soviet Socialist Republic) Ukrainian SSR
Ternopil Regional Committee of the Communist Party of the Soviet Union	Ternopil Oblast	(Ukrainian Soviet Socialist Republic) Ukrainian SSR
Vinnitsa Regional Committee of the Communist Party of the Soviet Union	Vinnitsa Oblast	(Ukrainian Soviet Socialist Republic) Ukrainian SSR
Volyn Regional Committee of the Communist Party of the Soviet Union	Volyn Oblast	(Ukrainian Soviet Socialist Republic) Ukrainian SSR
Zakarpattia Regional Committee of the Communist Party of the Soviet Union	Zakarpattia Oblast	(Ukrainian Soviet Socialist Republic) Ukrainian SSR
Zaporizhzhya Regional Committee of the Communist Party of the Soviet Union	Zaporizhzhya Oblast	(Ukrainian Soviet Socialist Republic) Ukrainian SSR
Zhytomyr Regional Committee of the Communist Party of the Soviet Union	Zhytomyr Oblast	(Ukrainian Soviet Socialist Republic) Ukrainian SSR

=== Uzbek Soviet Socialist Republic - Communist Party of the Uzbek SSR ===
Regional Committee	Area	Republic
Regional Committees of the Uzbek SSR
Andijan Regional Committee of the Communist Party of the Soviet Union	Andijan Oblast	(Uzbek Soviet Socialist Republic) Uzbek SSR
Bukhara Regional Committee of the Communist Party of the Soviet Union	Bukhara Oblast	(Uzbek Soviet Socialist Republic) Uzbek SSR
Ferghana Regional Committee of the Communist Party of the Soviet Union	Ferghana Oblast	(Uzbek Soviet Socialist Republic) Uzbek SSR
Jizzakh Regional Committee of the Communist Party of the Soviet Union	Jizzakh Oblast	(Uzbek Soviet Socialist Republic) Uzbek SSR
Karakalpak Regional Committee of the Communist Party of the Soviet Union	Karakalpak ASSR	(Uzbek Soviet Socialist Republic) Uzbek SSR
Kashkadrya Regional Committee of the Communist Party of the Soviet Union	Kashkadrya Oblast	(Uzbek Soviet Socialist Republic) Uzbek SSR
Khorezm Regional Committee of the Communist Party of the Soviet Union	Khorezm Oblast	(Uzbek Soviet Socialist Republic) Uzbek SSR
Namangan Regional Committee of the Communist Party of the Soviet Union	Namangan Oblast	(Uzbek Soviet Socialist Republic) Uzbek SSR
Samarkand Regional Committee of the Communist Party of the Soviet Union	Samarkand Oblast	(Uzbek Soviet Socialist Republic) Uzbek SSR
Surkhandarya Regional Committee of the Communist Party of the Soviet Union	Surkhandarya Oblast	(Uzbek Soviet Socialist Republic) Uzbek SSR
Syrdarya Regional Committee of the Communist Party of the Soviet Union	Syrdarya Oblast	(Uzbek Soviet Socialist Republic) Uzbek SSR
Tashkent Regional Committee of the Communist Party of the Soviet Union	Tashkent Oblast	(Uzbek Soviet Socialist Republic) Uzbek SSR

== See also ==
- Communist Party of the Soviet Union
- Oblast
- Autonomous Soviet Socialist Republic
- Chinese Communist Party Provincial Standing Committee
