= People's capitalism =

"People's capitalism" was an American propaganda meme popularized in the mid-1950s as a name for the American economic system by the Ad Council's Theodore Repplier. It was endorsed by President Dwight D. Eisenhower for worldwide use by the United States Information Agency, which employed the term to trumpet the successful aspects of the American economy worldwide during the Cold War. The propagandists depicted the United States as a classless society of prospering workers versus societies of "slaves" in the Soviet Union and China. Repplier had come to believe that capitalism had been marked by "an unpleasant odor" and felt that an international campaign hailing the American capitalist system was called for.

However, Repplier was not the actual inventor of the meme that the United States had reached the ideal of classless existence. "Our houses are all on one level, like our class structure", proclaimed a 1953 issue of the Hearst magazine House Beautiful.

The propaganda campaign was first tested at an exhibition hailing the progress driven by the "people's capitalism" in Washington, D.C. in 1956, contravening a purely formal ban on propaganda aimed at Americans passed through the 1948 Smith–Mundt Act. The government then arranged for "people's capitalism" exhibits at international fairs worldwide. The meme was concurrently picked up domestically by supportive voices in the leading organs of the American press, who praised the American system of "people's capitalism" in Life and The New York Times. The propaganda was not ignored in the Soviet Union as a 1956 Pravda editorial by Dmitry Shepilov noted:

In the United States the 'new capitalism' myth has been elevated to an official state doctrine, and the propagation of this 'people's capitalism' has been assigned to a special government information agency. [...] The information agency has even organized a special 'People's Capitalism' exhibition that will be put on display at fairs all over the world. Yet 'people's capitalism' is as absurd an idea as fried ice!
