= Mikhail Suslov =

Soviet statesman (1902–1982)

- Михаил Суслов
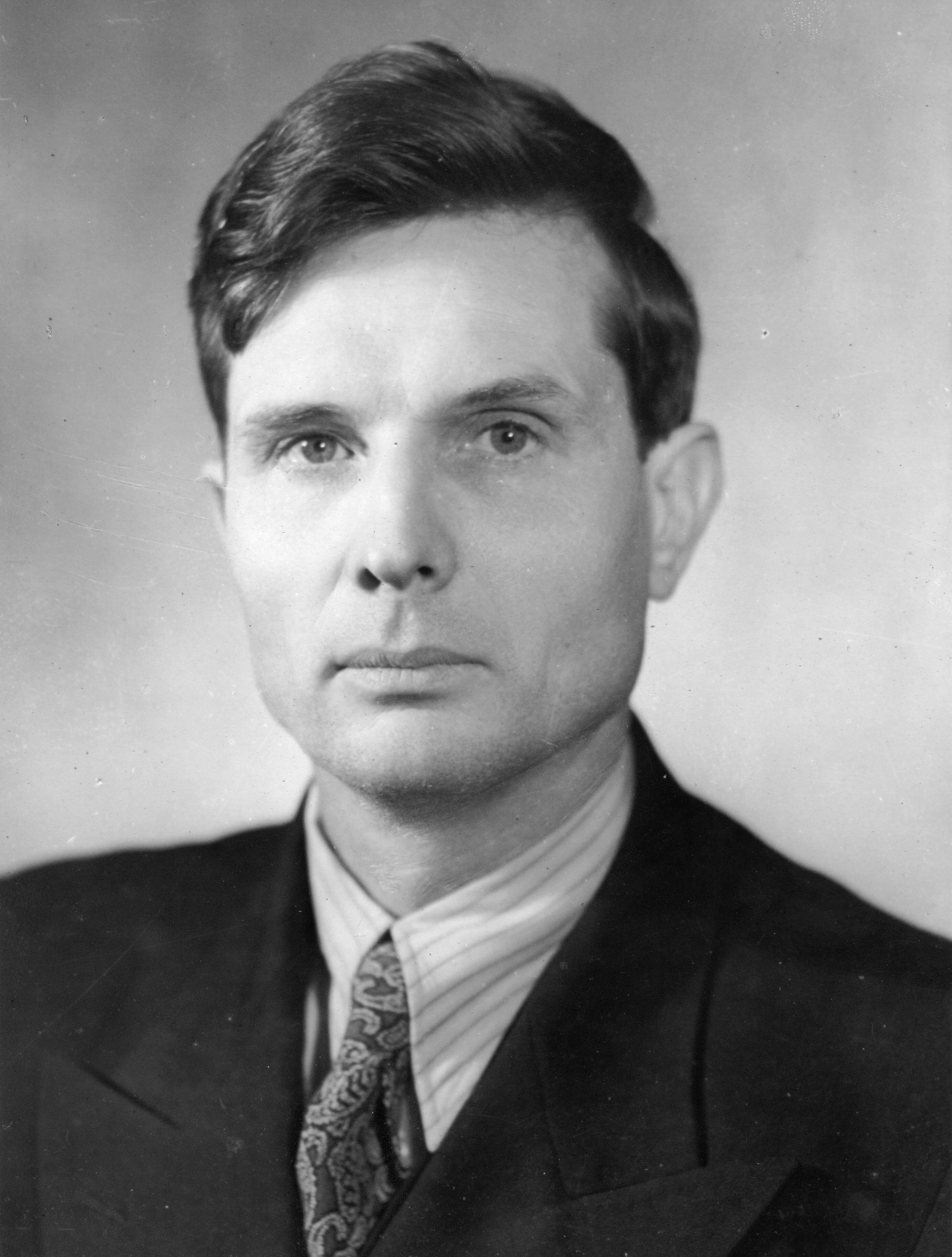
- Suslov in 1948

Second Secretary of the Communist Party of the Soviet Union
- In office 6 December 1965 – 25 January 1982
- Leader: Leonid Brezhnev
- Preceded by: Nikolai Podgorny
- Premiers: Alexei Kosygin; Nikolai Tikhonov
- Succeeded by: Andrei Kirilenko

Senior Secretary of Ideology of the Communist Party of the Soviet Union
- In office 31 August 1948 – 25 January 1982
- Preceded by: Andrei Zhdanov
- Succeeded by: Konstantin Chernenko (acting)

First Secretary of the Stavropol Regional Committee
- In office 21 August 1939 – November 1944
- Preceded by: Dmitry Goncharov
- Succeeded by: Aleksandr Orlov

Personal details
- Born: Mikhail Andreyevich Suslov; 21 November 1902 Shakhovskoye, Russian Empire
- Died: 25 January 1982 (aged 79) Moscow, Russian SFSR, Soviet Union
- Resting place: Kremlin Wall Necropolis, Moscow
- Party: CPSU (1921–1982)
- Spouse: Yelizaveta Alexandrovna (death 1972)
- Children: 2
- Education: Plekhanov Russian University of Economics
- Profession: Civil servant; economist
- Awards: Hero of Socialist Labor (twice)

Military service
- Allegiance: Soviet Union
- Branch/service: Soviet partisans
- Years of service: 1941–1945
- Battles/wars: World War II; Eastern Front; Battle of the Caucasus; Baltic guerrilla war; Hungarian Uprising
- Central institution membership: 1952–1953 & 1955–1982: Full member, 19th, 20th–21st, 22nd, 23rd, 24th, 25th, 26th Politburo; 1947–1982: Member, 18th, 19th, 20th–21st, 22nd, 23rd, 24th, 25th, 26th Secretariat; 1946–1952: Member, 18th Orgburo; 1939–1982: Full member, 18th, 19th, 20th, 22nd, 23rd, 24th, 25th, & 26th Central Committee; Other political offices held: 1949–1952: Head of the Propaganda Department of the Central Committee; 1949–1950: Editor-in-chief of Pravda; 1947–1948: Head of the Agitation & Propaganda Department of the Central Committee; 1946–1949 & 1953–1954: Head of the International Department of the Central Committee

Mikhail Andreyevich Suslov (Russian: Михаи́л Андре́евич Су́слов; 21 November [O.S. 8 November] 1902 – 25 January 1982) was a Soviet politician. In addition to serving as the Central Committee's longtime Secretary of Ideology, he held office as Second Secretary of the Communist Party of the Soviet Union from 1965 until his death in 1982.

Born in rural Russia in 1902, Suslov became a member of the All-Union Communist Party (Bolsheviks) in 1921 and studied economics for much of the 1920s. He left his job as a teacher in 1931 to pursue politics full-time, becoming one of the many Soviet politicians who took part in the mass repression begun by Joseph Stalin's regime. He was made First Secretary of Stavropol Krai administrative area in 1939. During World War II, Suslov headed the local Stavropol guerrilla movement.

After the war, Suslov became a member of the Organisational Bureau (Orgburo) of the Central Committee in 1946. In June 1950, he was elected to the Presidium of the Supreme Soviet. From 16 October 1952 onwards, he was a full member of the 19th Presidium of the CPSU. In the ensuing shuffle of the Soviet leadership following Stalin's death, Suslov lost much of the recognition and influence he had previously earned. However, by the late 1950s, he had risen to become the leader of the party opposition to First Secretary Nikita Khrushchev.

When Khrushchev was ousted in 1964, Suslov supported the establishment of a collective leadership. He also supported inner-party democracy and opposed the reestablishment of the one-man rule as seen during the Stalin and Khrushchev eras. Under the leadership of Leonid Brezhnev, Suslov was considered to be the party's chief ideologue and second-in-command. He ultimately died in office on 25 January 1982.

== Early years and career ==
Suslov was born in Shakhovskoye, Khvalynsky Uyezd, Saratov Governorate (today, a rural locality in Pavlovsky District, Ulyanovsk Oblast), Russian Empire on 21 November 1902. Suslov began work in the local Komsomol organisation in Saratov in 1918, eventually becoming a member of the Poverty Relief Committee. After working in the Komsomol for nearly three years, Suslov became a member of the All-Union Communist Party (the Bolsheviks) in 1921. After graduating from the rabfak, he studied economics at the Plekhanov Institute of National Economy between 1924 and 1928. In the summer of 1928, after graduating from the Plekhanov institute, he became a graduate student (research fellow) in economics at the Institute of Red Professors, teaching at Moscow State University and at the Industrial Academy.

In 1931, he abandoned teaching in favour of the party apparatus. He became an inspector on the Communist Party's Party Control Commission and on the People's Commissariat of the Workers' and Peasants' Inspectorate. His main task there was to adjudicate large numbers of "personal cases", breaches of discipline, and appeals against expulsion from the party.

In 1933 and 1934, Suslov directed a commission charged with purging the party in the Ural and Chernigov provinces. The purge was organised by Lazar Kaganovich, then Chairman of the Soviet Control Commission. Author Yuri Druzhnikov contends that Suslov was involved with setting up several show trials, and contributed to the Party by expelling all members deviating from the Party line, meaning Trotskyists, Zinovievists, and other left-wing deviationists.

From 1936 to 1937, Suslov studied at the Postgraduate Course of the Economic Institute of Red Professors. He gained a reputation as an unsociable, modest, and serious student who carefully studied and memorized the works and speeches of Marx, Engels, Lenin, and Stalin and became known for keeping a complete record of their statements on economic and political issues in boxes of cards and file cabinets in his tiny room in a communal apartment. Somehow, Stalin urgently needed Lenin's opinion on one narrow economic issue and dispatched his secretary Lev Mekhlis to locate the answer. Mekhlis, Suslov's classmate at the institute, approached him and instantly found the necessary quote. An amazed Stalin asked how he managed to find the quote so quickly, upon which Mekhlis introduced Stalin to Suslov. Stalin immediately had Suslov promoted to a secretary of the Rostov Regional Committee in 1937. Suslov has been linked to political repression in Rostov as part of the Great Purge in 1938, however writer Roy Medvedev has questioned this, stating that "we have no evidence of his personal involvement in the repressive campaigns of 1937–1938, though they certainly paved the way for his rapid rise." Suslov was made First Secretary of the Stavropol Krai Committee in 1939.

=== Wartime activities (1941–1945) ===
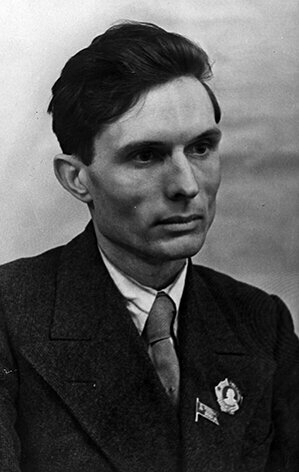
Suslov in 1941

On the Eastern Front in World War II, Suslov was a member of Military Council of the North Caucasian Front and led the Stavropol Krai Headquarters of the Partisan Divisions (the local guerrilla movement) after the Germans occupied the area. Suslov spent much of his time mobilising workers to fight against the German invaders. The guerrilla movement he led was operated by the regional party cells; Suslov for his part maintained close contact with the Red Army.

According to Soviet historiography, Suslov's years as a guerrilla fighter were highly successful; however, testimonies from participants differ from the official account. These participants claim that there were a number of organizational problems which reduced their effectiveness on the battlefield. Suslov also suffered badly from tuberculosis, which he had contracted in his youth, that was further exacerbated in the dense partisan forests and hampered his ability as an effective combatant. Fearing further relapses, for the rest of his life, he continued to wear galoshes on his shoes as well as a hat and raincoat at all times, even in the hot summer weather, which made him the subject of jokes among his colleagues in Brezhnev's Politburo.

Suslov later purged the Baltic region in the aftermath of the Great Patriotic War. From 1944 to 1946, he chaired the Central Committee Bureau for Lithuanian Affairs. Anti-Soviet samizdat literature from the height of his power in the 1970s would accuse him of being personally responsible for the deportation and killings of nationalist Lithuanians who became political opponents of the Soviets during the course of Soviet re-entry into the Baltic states on their drive to Berlin in 1944.

=== Rise to the Soviet leadership ===
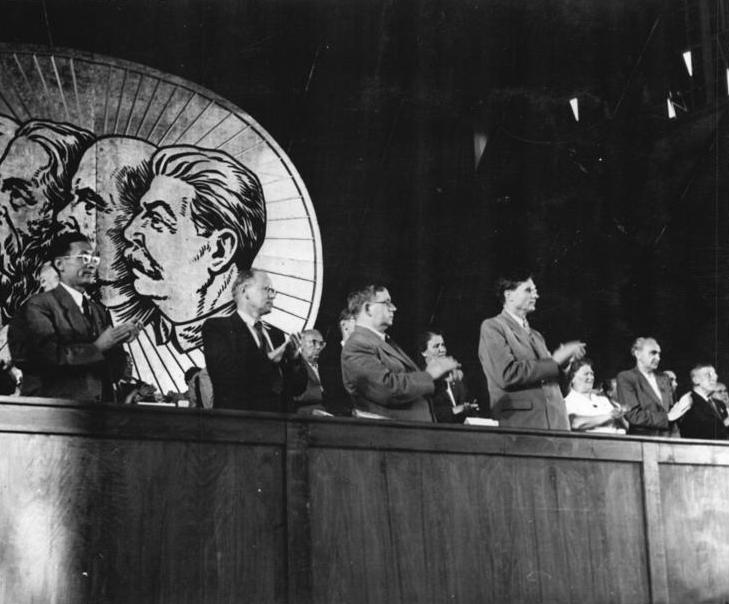
Suslov (standing, front row, furthest to the right) at the 3rd Party Congress of East Germany's ruling Socialist Unity Party, 1950

In 1946, Suslov was made a member of the Orgburo and immediately became the Head of the Foreign Policy Department of the Central Committee. Within a year, Suslov was appointed Head of the Central Committee Department for Agitation and Propaganda. He also became a harsh critic of the Jewish Anti-Fascist Committee in the post-war years. On 26 November 1946, Suslov sent a letter to Andrei Zhdanov, accusing the Jewish Anti-Fascist Committee of spying. Suslov's letter, which was well-received among Soviet leadership, would serve as the basis for prosecution of the committee during the anti-cosmopolitan campaign. After becoming head of the Agitprop, at the height of the anti-cosmopolitan campaign, Suslov also purged Jews from media and public institutions.

In 1947, Suslov was transferred to Moscow and elected to the Central Committee Secretariat. In January 1948, Stalin entrusted him with the task of speaking on behalf of the Central Committee before a solemn meeting on the twenty-fourth anniversary of Vladimir Lenin's death. Upon Zhdanov's death in August 1948, Suslov succeeded him as CC Secretary of Ideology. From September 1949 to 1950, he was editor-in-chief of the central Party daily Pravda.

In 1949, Suslov became a member of a commission created to investigate charges levied against Moscow's local Communist Party First Secretary, Georgy Popov. Russian historian Roy Medvedev speculates in his book, Neizvestnyi Stalin, that Stalin had made Suslov his "secret heir". Based on documents discovered within his safe, Stalin's feared secret police chief, Lavrentiy Beria, ranked Suslov first among those he wanted to "eliminate" before his political downfall.

In June 1950, Suslov was elected to the Presidium of the Supreme Soviet. He was promoted to the CPSU Presidium (later known as the Politburo) in 1952 following the 19th Party Congress. He suffered a temporary reversal when Stalin died and was dismissed from the Presidium in 1953. He continued to work in the Supreme Soviet, even becoming Chairman of the Commission of Foreign Affairs in the years immediately following Stalin's death.

== Khrushchev era ==
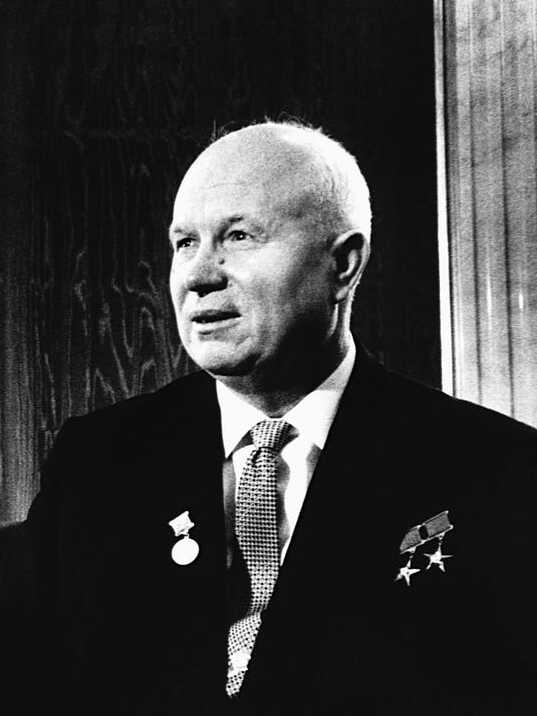
Nikita Khrushchev, leader of the Soviet Union (1954–1964)

Suslov recovered his authority in 1955 and was elected to a seat in the Presidium, bypassing the customary candidate membership. In the 20th Party Congress of 1956, Khrushchev delivered the famous Secret Speech about Stalin's cult of personality. In Suslov's ideological report on 16 February, he updated his criticism of Stalin and his personality cult:

"(They) caused considerable harm to both organisational and ideological party work. They belittled the role of the masses and the role of the Party, disparaged collective leadership, undermined inner-party democracy, suppressed the activeness of party members, their initiative and enterprise, led to lack of control, irresponsibility, and even arbitrariness in the work of individuals, prevented the development of criticism and self-criticism, and gave rise to one-sided and at times mistaken decisions."

— Suslov, statement at the 20th Congress of the CPSU

During the Hungarian Revolution of 1956, Suslov, along with Anastas Mikoyan, operated in close proximity to Budapest in order to direct the activities of the Soviet troops and to lend assistance to the new Hungarian leadership. Suslov and Mikoyan attended the Politburo meeting of the Hungarian Socialist Workers' Party which elected János Kádár to the office of General Secretary. In a telegram to the Soviet leadership, Suslov and Mikoyan acknowledged that the situation had become more dire, but both were content with the dismissal of Ernő Gerő as General Secretary and the choice of Kádár as his successor.

The Presidium of the Supreme Soviet criticised Suslov's and Mikoyan's concessions to the new government in the People's Republic of Hungary. Despite his initial reservations, Suslov eventually supported the Presidium's decision to intervene in Hungary militarily and replace the government's leadership there.

In June 1957, Suslov backed Khrushchev during his struggle with the Anti-Party Group led by Georgy Malenkov, Vyacheslav Molotov, Lazar Kaganovich, and Dmitry Shepilov. Mikoyan later wrote in his memoirs that he convinced Suslov to support Khrushchev by telling him that Khrushchev would emerge the winner even if he did not have enough support in the Presidium.

The following October Suslov accused Georgy Zhukov, the Minister of Defence, of "Bonapartism" at the Central Committee plenum that removed him from all party and government posts. The removal of Zhukov had the effect of firmly subordinating the armed forces to party control.

In a speech on 22 January 1958, Khrushchev officially proposed to dissolve the Machine and Tractor Stations (MTS), state organizations that owned and maintained the farm machinery used by kolkhozy. This reform had a particular significance in Soviet ideology. In Marxist-Leninist doctrine, cooperative ownership of property was considered a "lower" form of public ownership than state ownership. Khrushchev's proposal to expand cooperative ownership ran contrary to the Marxist theory as interpreted by Stalin.

Suslov, who supported Stalin's economic policy, regarded Khrushchev's proposal as unacceptable on ideological grounds. In an election speech to the Supreme Soviet in March 1958, Suslov refused to recognise the ideological significance of Khrushchev's reform, preferring instead to focus on the reform's practical benefits in improving productivity. Unlike other Party leaders, Suslov avoided mentioning Khrushchev as the MTS reform's initiator.

The 21st Party Congress convened in January 1959. Khrushchev wanted to consider the draft of a new Seven-Year plan. Suslov cautiously demonstrated against Khrushchev's statement that the country had developed from the socialist state of development to the higher state of communist development. He saw Khrushchev's view as flawed, and countered that his view had not been approved by the Party. To discredit Khrushchev's assertion further, Suslov invoked Karl Marx and Vladimir Lenin:

"Marx and Lenin teach us that communism doesn't appear suddenly, but comes into existence, matures, develops, passes in its development through definite stages or phases.... The new period in the development of Soviet society will be marked by the gradual drawing together of two forms of socialist property – state and kolkhoz... The process of these social changes will be long, and understandably, cannot end in the course of a seven-year period."

— Suslov, statement at the 21st Congress of the CPSU

Suslov was becoming progressively more critical of Khrushchev's policies, his political intransigence, and his campaign to eliminate what was left of the Stalinist old guard. There were also deep-seated divergences in foreign and domestic policy between Suslov and Khrushchev. Suslov opposed the idea of improving Soviet Union–United States relations and was against Khrushchev's attempts at rapprochement with Yugoslavia. Domestically, Suslov opposed Khrushchev's policy of de-Stalinisation and his economic decentralisation scheme.

Suslov visited the United Kingdom in 1959 as a parliamentarian for the Supreme Soviet. The visit was a success, and Hugh Gaitskell, the Leader of the Labour Party, travelled to the Soviet Union later that year as a guest.

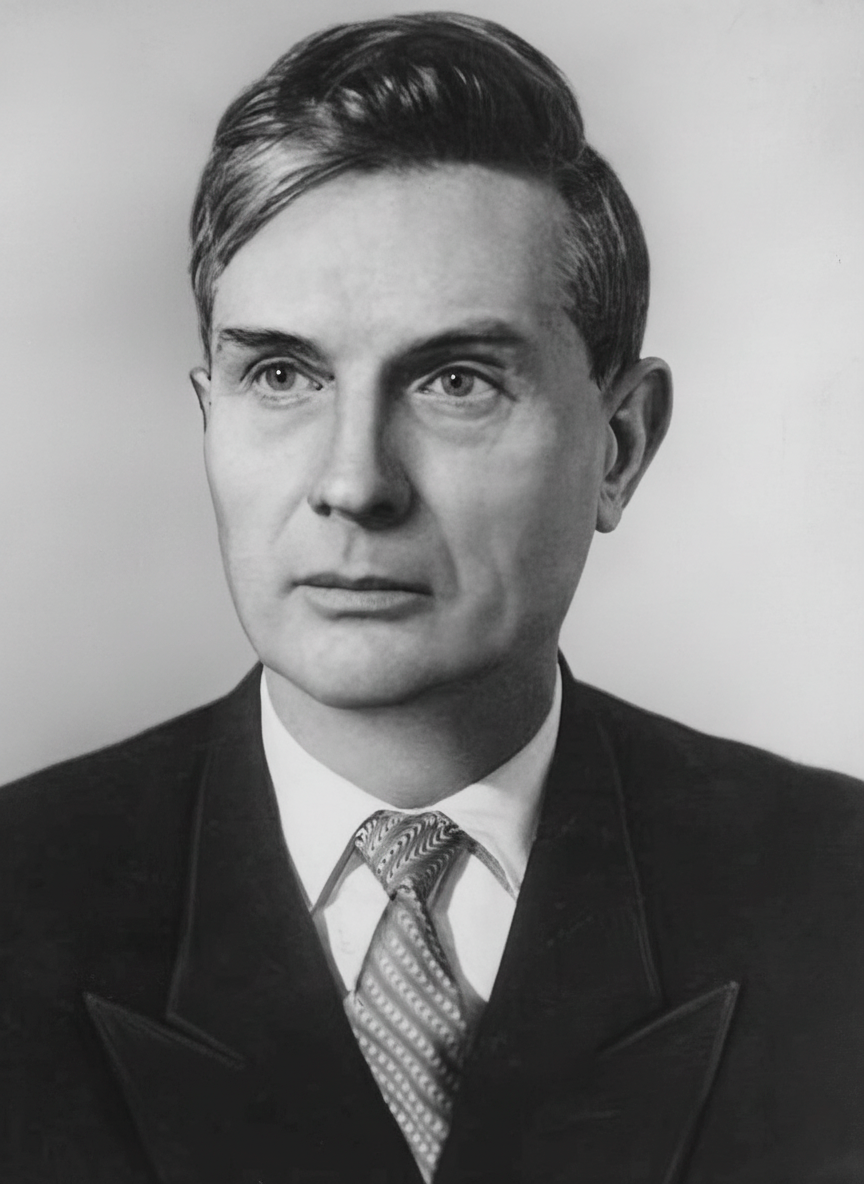
Suslov in 1963.

Sino–Soviet relations had long been strained and, as Suslov told the Central Committee in one of his reports, "The crux of the matter is that the Leadership of the CCP has recently developed tendencies to exaggerate the degree of maturity of socialist relations in China... There are elements of conceit and haughtiness. [These shortcomings] are largely explained by the atmosphere of the cult of personality of comrade Mao Zedong... who, by all accounts, himself has come to believe in his own infallibility." Suslov compared Mao's growing personality cult with that seen under Joseph Stalin.

Suslov was highly critical of Maoist China, as he led the Sino-Soviet Dispute and criticized Maoism in various ways under the Khrushchev administration, particularly its split from the Soviet leadership in the Socialist Camp, the rejection of the theory of Peaceful Coexistence, and Mao's support of anti-Soviet rival communist militant groups globally. In a report made on 14 February 1964 at a plenary meeting of the Central Committee, Suslov compared Mao's China to Trotskyism, and denounced the Chinese leadership as petty-bourgeois nationalists and left-deviationists:

[...] the entire range of the CPC leadership's theoretical and political views are in many ways a rehash of Trotskyism [...] an examination of the sources of the present anti-Leninist dissentive policy of the CPC leadership leads up to the conclusion that the world communist movement faces a tangible danger of petty‐bourgeois nationalist deviation that disguises itself with "Left" phrase-mongering.

— Suslov, Struggle of the CPSU for Unity of the International Communist Movement

In the years following the failure of the Anti-Party Group, Suslov became the leader of the faction in the Central Committee opposed to Khrushchev's leadership, known as the "Moscow faction". Khrushchev was able to hold on to power by conceding to various opposition demands in times of crisis, such as during the 1960 U-2 incident and the 1962 Cuban Missile Crisis. In the aftermath of the U-2 Crisis Suslov was able to remove, and replace, several of Khrushchev's appointees in the Politburo with new anti-Khrushchev members. Khrushchev's position was greatly weakened further after the failure of the Cuban Missile Crisis, and Suslov's power greatly increased.

A campaign to oust Khrushchev from office was initiated in 1964. Although leader of the opposition, Suslov had fallen seriously ill during his trip to the People's Republic of China the previous year; instead, Leonid Brezhnev and Alexei Kosygin led the opposition.

== Brezhnev era ==
=== Gatekeeper of Marxist-Leninist Dogma ===
In October 1964, Mikhail Suslov played a central role in having Khrushchev removed from power. Thereafter, a triumvirate or troika assumed power in the Kremlin consisting of Leonid Brezhnev as First Secretary, Alexei Kosygin as Premier, and CC Secretary Nikolai Podgorny. Likewise, Suslov emerged as one of the most powerful figures in the Soviet leadership, ranking fourth in the Politburo hierarchy behind the members of the ruling troika. By 1965, he was promoted to Second Secretary, the most senior official within the party apparatus beneath the First Secretary. For the next 10 years, Suslov was one of only four people who had both a seat in the Secretariat and the Politburo alongside Brezhnev, Andrei Kirilenko and Fyodor Kulakov.

From the beginning, Suslov was a vocal critic of one-man rule such as that seen under Joseph Stalin and Khrushchev. A strong supporter of democratic centralism, Suslov prevented Brezhnev from taking over Kosygin's post as head of government in 1970.

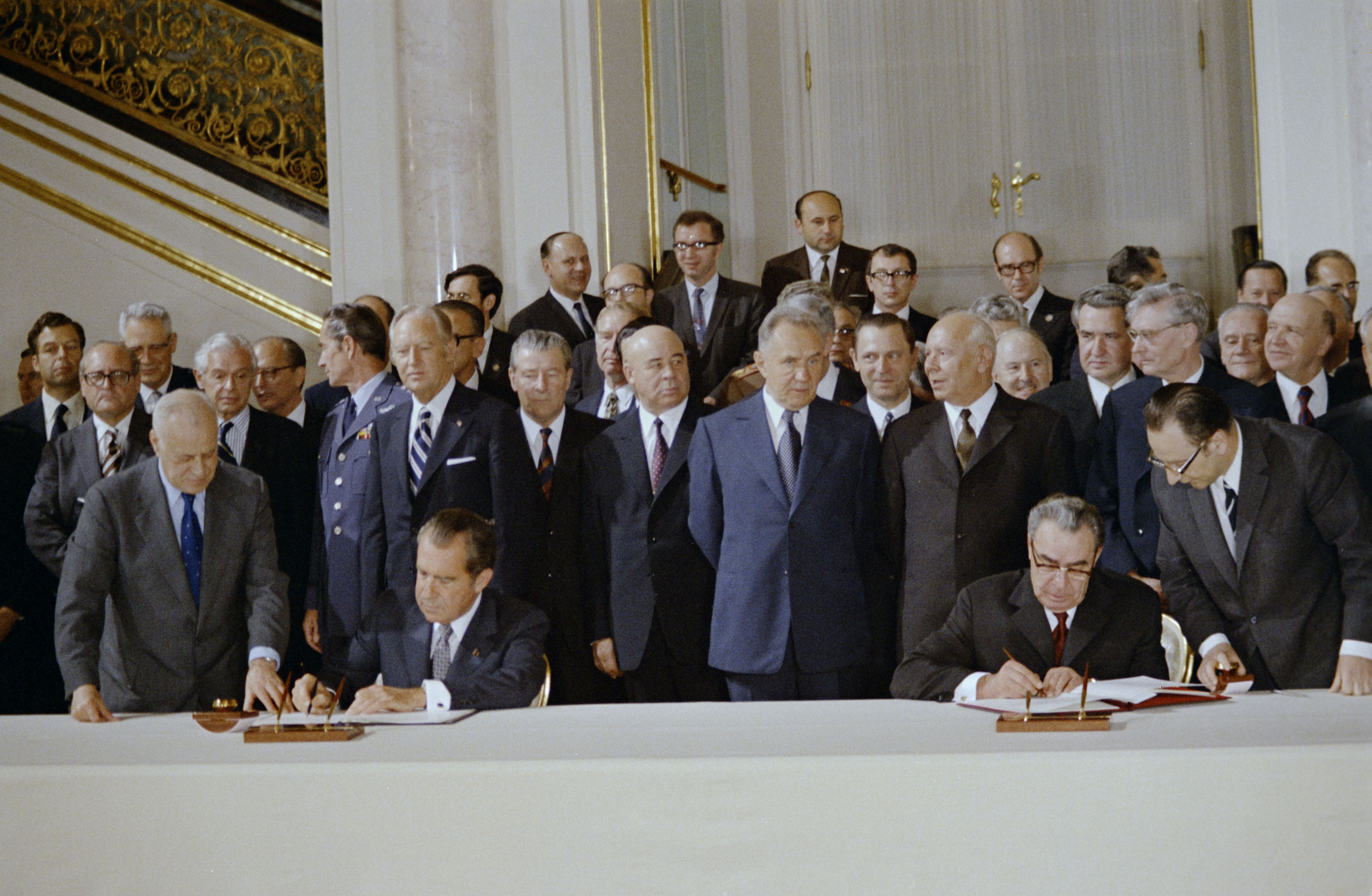
Suslov (standing behind Brezhnev on the right) at the signing the SALT agreement, 1972.

It was during the Brezhnev era that Mikhail Suslov was given the unofficial title "Chief Ideologue of the Communist Party". He devoted much of his time memorializing the legacies of Vladimir Lenin, Karl Marx and Friedrich Engels. Suslov also grew increasingly concerned that the Soviet Union would lose its leading role in the communist movement. Consequently, he became an outspoken opponent of political reform throughout the communist world. According to Christian Schmidt-Häuer, Suslov was regarded as the "pope" among orthodox communist officials in the Eastern Bloc.

In the midst of following the party line set by Moscow, Suslov supported a retreat from some core beliefs of Marxism-Leninism, including the end of single, Party-approved natural science versions of biology, chemistry and physics. On the other hand, there still existed tight ideological control over literature. This included not only literature critical of Soviet policies, but much of Lenin's work. Suslov was also known for opposing dramatic changes to the administrative structure of the Soviet state. In 1966, he provided "backstage support" to Soviet Azerbaijan in vetoing the effort of Nagorno-Karabakh to join Soviet Armenia.

=== Later life and death ===
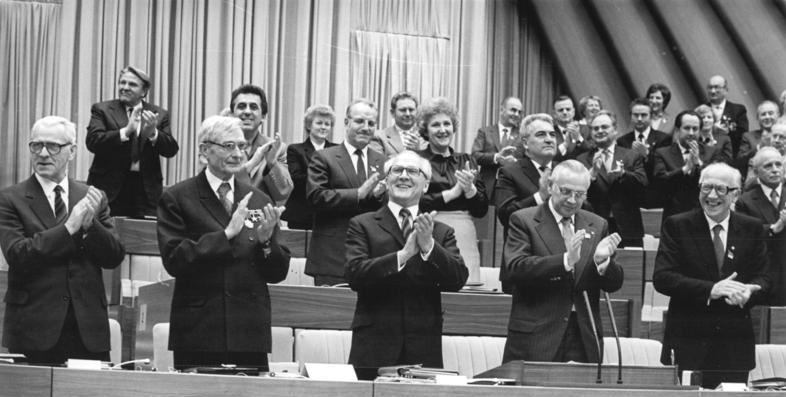
Suslov (standing second from left in front row) at the 10th Party Congress of East Germany's ruling Socialist Unity Party, 1981

At the beginning of the 1980s, the political and economic turmoil in the Polish People's Republic had seriously eroded the authority of the Polish United Workers' Party. Suslov's position on this matter carried particular weight as he chaired a Politburo Commission, established on 25 August 1980, on how to deal with the Polish crisis. Members of the commission included such high-ranking Soviets as KGB Chairman Yuri Andropov, Minister of Defence Dmitry Ustinov, Minister of Foreign Affairs Andrei Gromyko, and Brezhnev's long-time associate Konstantin Chernenko.

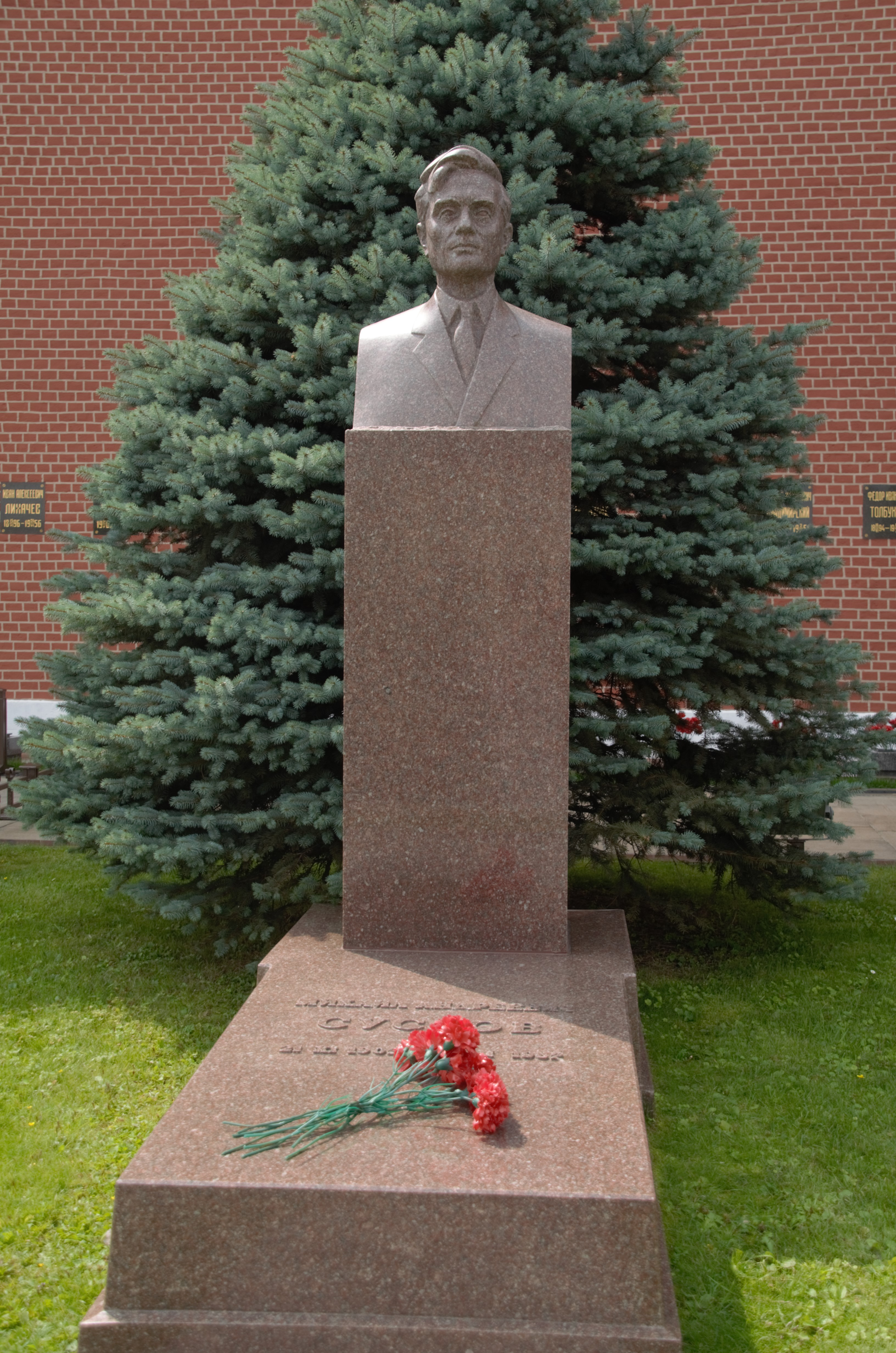
Suslov's tomb in the Kremlin Wall Necropolis

On 28 August, the Commission considered Soviet military intervention to stabilize the region. Wojciech Jaruzelski, First Secretary of the Polish United Workers' Party, was able to persuade the Commission that a Soviet military intervention would only aggravate the situation. Suslov agreed with Jaruzelski's argument, stating that "if troops are introduced, that will mean a catastrophe. I think that we all share the unanimous opinion here that there can be no discussion of any introduction of troops". Suslov was able to persuade Jaruzelski and the Polish leadership to establish martial law in Poland. In January 1982, Andropov revealed to Suslov that Semyon Tsvigun, the First Deputy Chairman of the KGB, had shielded Galina and Yuri, Brezhnev's children, from corruption investigations. When these facts were revealed to him, Suslov challenged Tsvigun to make a statement on the matter. Suslov even threatened Tsvigun with expulsion from the Communist Party, but Tsvigun died on 19 January 1982 before he could challenge Suslov's statement.

Two days later, Suslov had a coronary thrombosis, and died on 25 January of arteriosclerosis and diabetes at 16:05. His death is viewed as starting the battle to succeed Brezhnev. Thereafter, Andropov assumed Suslov's place in the Secretariat before eventually sidelining Kirilenko and Chernenko during the final months of Brezhnev's rule.

Suslov was buried on 29 January at the Kremlin Wall Necropolis, in one of the twelve individual tombs located between the Lenin Mausoleum and the Kremlin Wall. Brezhnev expressed great sadness at Suslov's passing.

== Recognition ==
Suslov was awarded several decorations and medals during his life; among them were two Hero of Socialist Labour awards, five Orders of Lenin, one Order of the October Revolution, and one first degree Order of the Patriotic War. The USSR Academy of Sciences awarded Suslov the Gold Medal of Karl Marx. Suslov was awarded the highest state awards of the German Democratic Republic, the Mongolian People's Republic, and the Czechoslovak Socialist Republic.

Soviet Union

Order of Lenin, five times (16 March 1940, 20 November 1952, 20 November 1962, 2 December 1971, 20 November 1972)
Medal "To a Partisan of the Patriotic War", 1st class (1943)
Medal "For the Defence of the Caucasus" (1944)
Order of the Patriotic War, 1st class (24 March 1945)
Medal "For Valiant Labour in the Great Patriotic War 1941–1945" (1945)
Medal "For the Victory over Germany in the Great Patriotic War 1941–1945" (1945)
Hero of Socialist Labor, twice (20 November 1962, 20 November 1972)
Order of the October Revolution (18 November 1977)
Badge "50 Years in the CPSU" (1981)

Foreign

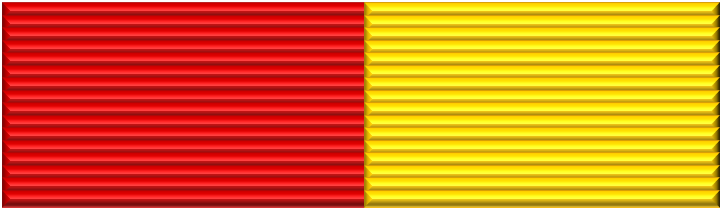
Hero of Socialist Labor (Bulgaria)
Order of Georgi Dimitrov (Bulgaria, 1977)
Order of Klement Gottwald (Czechoslovakia, 1977)
Order of Karl Marx (East Germany, 1978)
Order of Sukhbaatar (Mongolia)
Gold Star Order (Vietnam)

== Personal life ==
Suslov married Yelizaveta Alexandrovna (1903–1972), who worked as the Director of the Moscow Institute for Stomatology. In her life, she badly suffered from internal diseases, especially diabetes in a severe form, but ignored her physician's recommendations.

Bernard Lown, a Lithuanian-born American M.D., was once requested to see her in the Moscow Central Clinical Hospital; it was one of the few cases where a renowned foreign doctor was invited to visit the Kremlin Hospital. Suslov expressed his gratitude for Lown's work, but avoided meeting Lown in person because he was a representative of an "imperialistic" country.

Yelizaveta and Suslov had two children, Revoly (born 1929), named after the Russian Revolution, and his second child, Maya (born 1939), named after May Day.

== Bibliography ==
- Bacon, Edwin (2002). "Reconsidering Brezhnev". In Bacon, Edwin; Sandle, Mark (eds.). Brezhnev Reconsidered. Palgrave MacMillan Ltd. pp. 1–21. ISBN 978-0-333-79463-0.
- Borrero, Mauricio (2006). "Brezhnev, Leonid Ilyich 1906-1982". In Coppa, Frank J. (ed.). Encyclopedia of Modern Dictators:From Napoleon to the Present. Peter Lang Publishing, Inc. ISBN 0-8204-5010-3.
- Brown, Archie (2009). The Rise & Fall of Communism. London: Bodley Head. ISBN 978-0-224-07879-5.
- Crump, Thomas (2014). Brezhnev and the Decline of the Soviet Union. London: Routledge. ISBN 978-0-415-69073-7.
- Daniels, Robert Vincent (1998). Russia's Transformation: Snapshots of a Crumbling System. Rowman & Littlefield. ISBN 0-8476-8709-0.
- Diller, Daniel C., ed. (1990). The Soviet Union. Washington, D.C.: Congressional Quartlery. ISBN 0-87187-574-8.
- Hough, Jerry F.; Fainsod, Merle (1979). How the Soviet Union is Governed. Cambridge, MA: Harvard University Press. ISBN 0-674-41030-0.
- Kenez, Peter (2017). A History of the Soviet Union from the Beginning to Its Legacy. Cambridge: Cambridge University Press. ISBN 978-1-107-14105-6.
- Law, David A. (1975). Russian Civilization. New York: Ardent Media. ISBN 978-0-8422-0529-0.
- Medvedev, Roy; Medvedev, Zhores (2004). The Unknown Stalin: His Life, Death and Legacy. New York: The Overlook Press. ISBN 1-58567-502-4.
- Petroff, Serge (1988). The Red Eminence: A Biography of Mikhail A. Suslov. Cliffton, New Jersey: Kingston Press. ISBN 978-0-940670-13-6.
- Schmidt-Häuer, Christian (1986). Gorbachev: The Path to Power. London: I.B.Tauris. ISBN 978-1-85043-015-5.
- Sebag-Montefiore, Simon (2005). Stalin: The Court of the Red Tsar. New York: Vintage Books. ISBN 978-1-4000-7678-9.
- Service, Robert (2009). History of Modern Russia: From Tsarism to the Twenty-first Century. London: Penguin Books Ltd. ISBN 978-0-14-103797-4.
- Shakarian, Pietro A. (2025). Anastas Mikoyan: An Armenian Reformer in Khrushchev's Kremlin. Bloomington: Indiana University Press. ISBN 978-0253073556.

Party political offices
Preceded by Nikolai Podgorny	Second Secretary of the Communist Party of the Soviet Union; 1965–1982	Succeeded by Andrei Kirilenko
Preceded by Vahan Grigoryan	Head of Department for Relations with Foreign Communist Parties; 1953–1954	Succeeded by Boris Ponomarev
Preceded by Dmitri Shepilov	Head of the Propaganda Department of the Central Committee; 20 July 1949–27 October 1952	Succeeded by Nikolai Mikhailov
Preceded by Pyotr Pospelov	Editor-in-chief of Pravda; 1949–1950	Succeeded by Leonid Ilyichev
Preceded by Andrei Zhdanov	Senior Secretary of Ideology of the Communist Party of the Soviet Union; 1948–1982	Succeeded by Konstantin Chernenko
Preceded by Andrei Zhdanov	Head of the Propaganda and Agitation Department of the Central Committee; 17 September 1947–10 July 1948	Succeeded by Post abolished (merged into the Propaganda Department)
Preceded by Georgi Dimitrov	Head of the International Department of the Central Committee; 13 April 1946―12 March 1949	Succeeded by Vahan Grigoryan
Preceded by Dmitry Goncharov	First Secretary of the Stavropol Regional Committee; 1939–1944	Succeeded by Aleksandr Orlov
