= Krasnoyarsk State Agrarian University =

Agricultural school in Krasnoyarsk, Russia

- Красноярский государственный аграрный университет
- Type: Public
- Established: 1953
- Rector: Natalya Ivanovna Pyzhykova
- Administrative staff: 1272
- Students: 16211
- Undergraduates: 467
- Location: 90, Mira Av., (Russia) Krasnoyarsk, Krasnoyarsk Kray, Russia; 56.0119°N 92.8643°E
- Website: www.kgau.ru/
- Building details
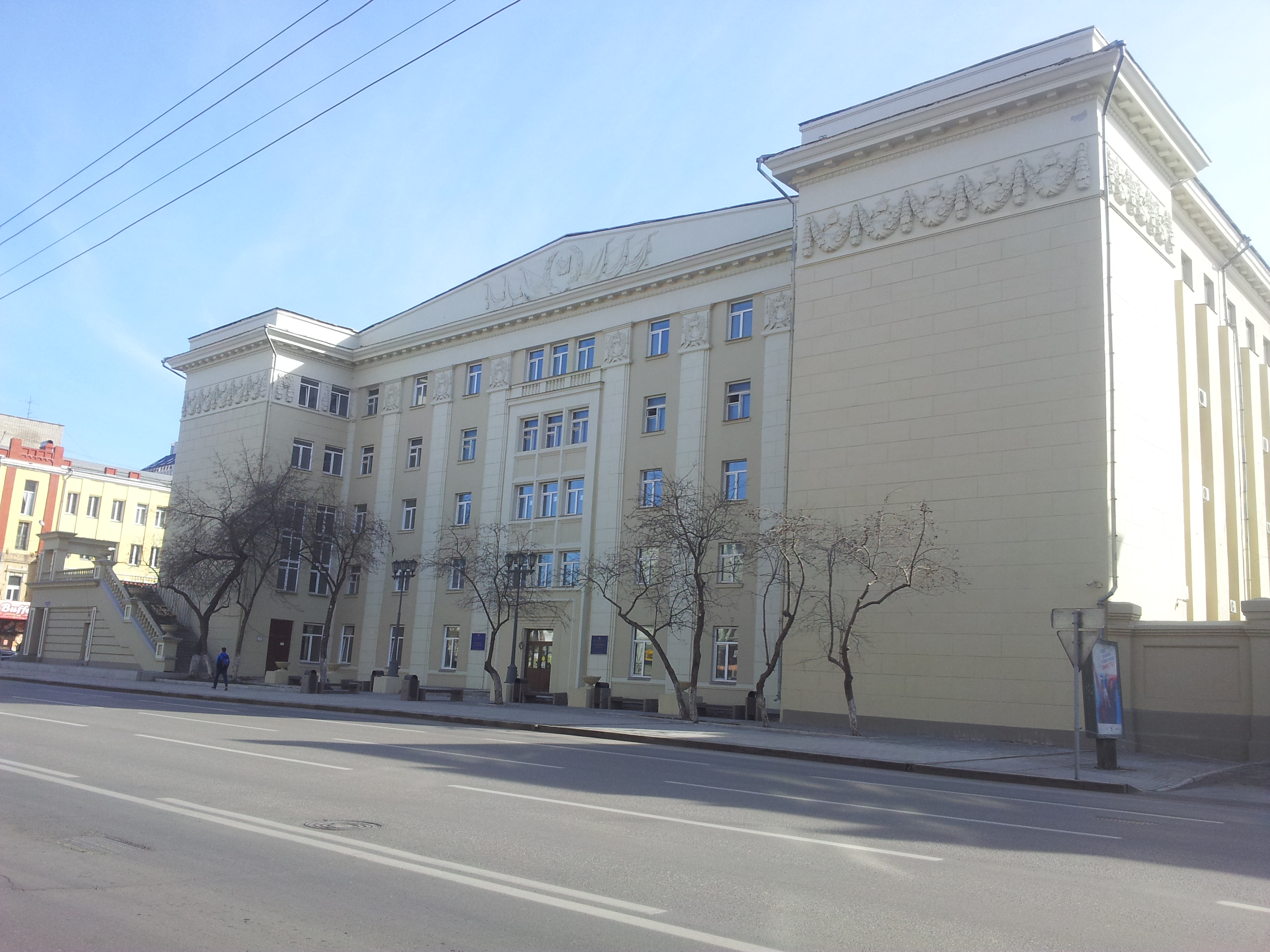

Krasnoyarsk State Agrarian University (Russian: Красноярский государственный аграрный университет, Krasnoyarskiy Gosudarstvenniy Agrarniy Universitet) is a university in Krasnoyarsk, Russian Federation. Founded in 1953.

== History ==
The university was founded in 1953 as "Krasnoyarsk Agricultural Institute" (Russian: Красноярский сельскохозяйственный институт, КСХИ). In 1994, the institute got the status of a university. Since 2017, Krasnoyarsk State Agrarian University became the Accredited member of European Council for Business Education.

The university works under the license of the Ministry of Agriculture of Russian Federation. The university carries out basic research.

== Institutes (Faculties) ==
As for 2019, Krasnoyarsk State Agrarian University consists of 7 Institutes (Faculties)

- Institute of Agro-ecological Technologies (Russian: Институт агроэкологических технологий)
- Institute of Applied Biotechnology and Veterinary Medicine (Russian: Институт прикладной биотехнологии и ветеринарной медицины)
- Institute of Food Production (Russian: Институт пищевых производств)
- Institute of Engineering Systems and Power (Russian: Институт инженерных систем и энергетики)
- Institute of Land Management, Cadastre and Environmental Engineering (Russian: Институт землеустройства, кадастров и природообустройства)
- Institute of Economics and Management of Agro-Industrial Complex (Russian: Институт экономики и управления АПК)
- Institute of Law (Russian: Юридический институт)

== Rectors ==
- Georgy Cheremisinov (May 1953 — March 1957)
- Pyotr Ipatov (March 1957 — March 1972)
- Roald Kondratyev (March 1972 — 1978)
- Viktor Zolotukhin (December 1978 - May 1995)
- Nikolai Tsuglenok (May 1995 - October 2014)
- Natalia Pyzhikova (acting since October 2014, from February 6, 2015 to present)

== Notable alumni ==
- Viktoria Abramchenko, Russian politician and economist
- Gennady Kazmin, Soviet politician

== See also ==
- List of institutions of higher learning in Russia
