= Shakhovskoye, Ulyanovsk Oblast =

Shakhovskoye Шаховское
- Selo
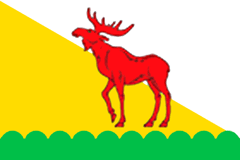
- Flag
- Interactive map of Shakhovskoye
- Location of Shakhovskoye Shakhovskoye (Ulyanovsk Oblast)
- Coordinates: 52°37′33″N 47°16′07″E
- Country: Russia
- Federal subject: Ulyanovsk Oblast
- Administrative district: Pavlovsky District
- Rural okrugSelsoviet: Shakhovsky Rural Okrug
- First mentioned: 1726

Population
  - Estimate (2010): 581 )

Administrative status
  - Capital of: Shakhovsky Rural Okrug

Municipal status
  - Municipal district: Pavlovsky Municipal District
  - Rural settlement: Shakhovskoye Rural Settlement
  - Capital of: Shakhovskoye Rural Settlement
- Time zone: UTC+4 (UTC+04:00)
- Postal code: 433991
- Dialing code: +7 84248
- OKTMO ID: 73632450101

Shakhovskoye (Russian: Шаховско́е) is a rural locality (a selo) in Pavlovsky District of Ulyanovsk Oblast, Russia.

== Notable people ==
Soviet statesman Mikhail Suslov was born here in 1902.
