= Khakassian Regional Committee of the Communist Party of the Soviet Union =

The First Secretary of the Khakassian regional branch of the Communist Party of the Soviet Union was the position of highest authority in the Khakassian NO (1925–1930), Khakassian AO (1930–1991) and the Khakassian ASSR (1991) in the Russian SFSR of the Soviet Union. The position was created in September 1925, and abolished on August 23, 1991. The First Secretary was a de facto appointed position usually by the Politburo or the General Secretary himself.

== List of First Secretaries of the Communist Party of Khakassia ==
Name	Term of Office		Life years
Name	Start	End	Life years
First Secretaries of the Oblast Committee of the Communist Party
Yegor Shurygin	November 1925	1927	
A.F. Kemerov	1927	1929	
A.I. Ryazanov	1930?	November 1931	
Sergey Sizykh	November 1931	February 9, 1937	1902–1938
Boris Kubasov	February 9, 1937	October 20, 1937	1898–
Zakhar Borisovich Khayms (Note: Acting)	November 1937	May 1938	1899–1942
?	1938	1939	
Konstantin Kulikov	1939	?	1910–1969
A. Naumov	1941?	?	
Dmitry Ivanchenko	1942?	?	
Fyodor Afanasyev	1944	1948?	
Taras Nemezhikov	1948	1952	1914–1960
Nikolay Gudilin	1952	1954	1911–?
Vlas Kolpakov	1954	1959	1909–?
Ilya Strakhov	July 1959	1961	1912–1984
Aleksandr Dankovtsev	1961	October 13, 1971	1913–1971
Aleksey Krylov	November 16, 1971	May 31, 1982	1928–
Victor Plisov	May 31, 1982	June 1983	1935–
Yevgeny Yeliseyev	June 1983	November 4, 1985	1936–
Oleg Shenin	November 4, 1985	October 30, 1987	1937–2009
Gennady Kazmin	October 30, 1987	August 1990	1934–
Valery Abramenko	August 1990	August 15, 1991	1950–
M.V. Zaytsev	August 15, 1991	August 1991	
