= Yury Semyonov =

Russian economist and politician (1938–2024)

- Юрий Семёнов

First Secretary of the Kaliningrad Regional Committee of the Communist Party of the Soviet Union
- In office 7 September 1989 – 23 August 1991
- Preceded by: Dmitry Romanin
- Succeeded by: position abolished

Personal details
- Born: Yury Nikolaevich Semyonov; 25 May 1938 Laskorevschina, Ostashkovsky District, Kalinin Oblast, Russian SFSR, USSR
- Died: 4 June 2024 (aged 86) Kaliningrad, Russia
- Party: CPSU
- Education: Russian State Agrarian University – Moscow Timiryazev Agricultural Academy
- Occupation: Economist

Yury Nikolaevich Semyonov (Russian: Юрий Николаевич Семёнов; 25 May 1938 – 4 June 2024) was a Russian economist and politician. A member of the Communist Party of the Soviet Union, he served as first secretary of the Kaliningrad Regional Committee of the Communist Party of the Soviet Union from 1989 to 1991.

Semyonov died in Kaliningrad on 4 June 2024, at the age of 86.
