= Anti-Party Group =

Soviet political faction

Anti-Party Group Антипартийная группа
- Leader: Georgy Malenkov; Lazar Kaganovich; Vyacheslav Molotov; Dmitri Shepilov
- Founded: May 1957; 69 years ago
- Dissolved: June 1957; 69 years ago
- Ideology: Communism; Marxism–Leninism; Stalinism; Anti-revisionism
- Political position: Far-left
- National affiliation: CPSU
- Seats in the Politburo: 7

The Anti-Party Group, fully referenced in Soviet political parlance as "the anti-Party group of Malenkov, Kaganovich, Molotov and Shepilov, who joined them" (Russian: антипартийная группа Маленкова, Кагановича, Молотова и примкнувшего к ним Шепилова, romanized: antipartiynaya gruppa Malenkova, Kaganovicha, Molotova i primknuvshego k nim Shepilova), was a Stalinist group within the leadership of the Communist Party of the Soviet Union that unsuccessfully attempted to depose Nikita Khrushchev as First Secretary of the Party in June 1957. The group, given that epithet by Khrushchev, was led by former Premiers Georgy Malenkov and Vyacheslav Molotov and former First Deputy Premier Lazar Kaganovich. The group rejected both Khrushchev's liberalization of Soviet society and his denunciation of Joseph Stalin, and promoted the full restoration and preservation of Stalinism.

== Motives ==
The formation of the group was the culmination of a long-standing current in Soviet politics opposed to the economic and political reforms undertaken by Khruschev during the Khrushchev thaw and following the Secret Speech of 1956, which was regarded as wrong and hypocritical given Khrushchev's complicity in the Great Purge and similar events as one of Stalin's favorites.

Molotov and the others in the Presidium opposed Khruschev's policies across the board. Specifically this included the decentralization of economic decision-making, the de-emphasis of class struggle internationally, the switch of investment priorities from industrial to agricultural, the encouragement of private agricultural activity and the loosening agricultural strictures, the "dash forward to communism" that intended to catch up to the West in consumer goods, and the Virgin Lands campaign.

Molotov called the Virgin Lands campaign an "adventure" that would take resources away from industrialization, while Malenkov argued that the goal should be to overtake the west in steel, iron, coal and oil, not consumer goods, calling Khrushchev's program "opportunistic" and a "rightist peasant deviation".

They also believed that Khrushchev's policy of peaceful coexistence would jeopardize struggle against capitalist powers internationally.

== Attempted take-over ==
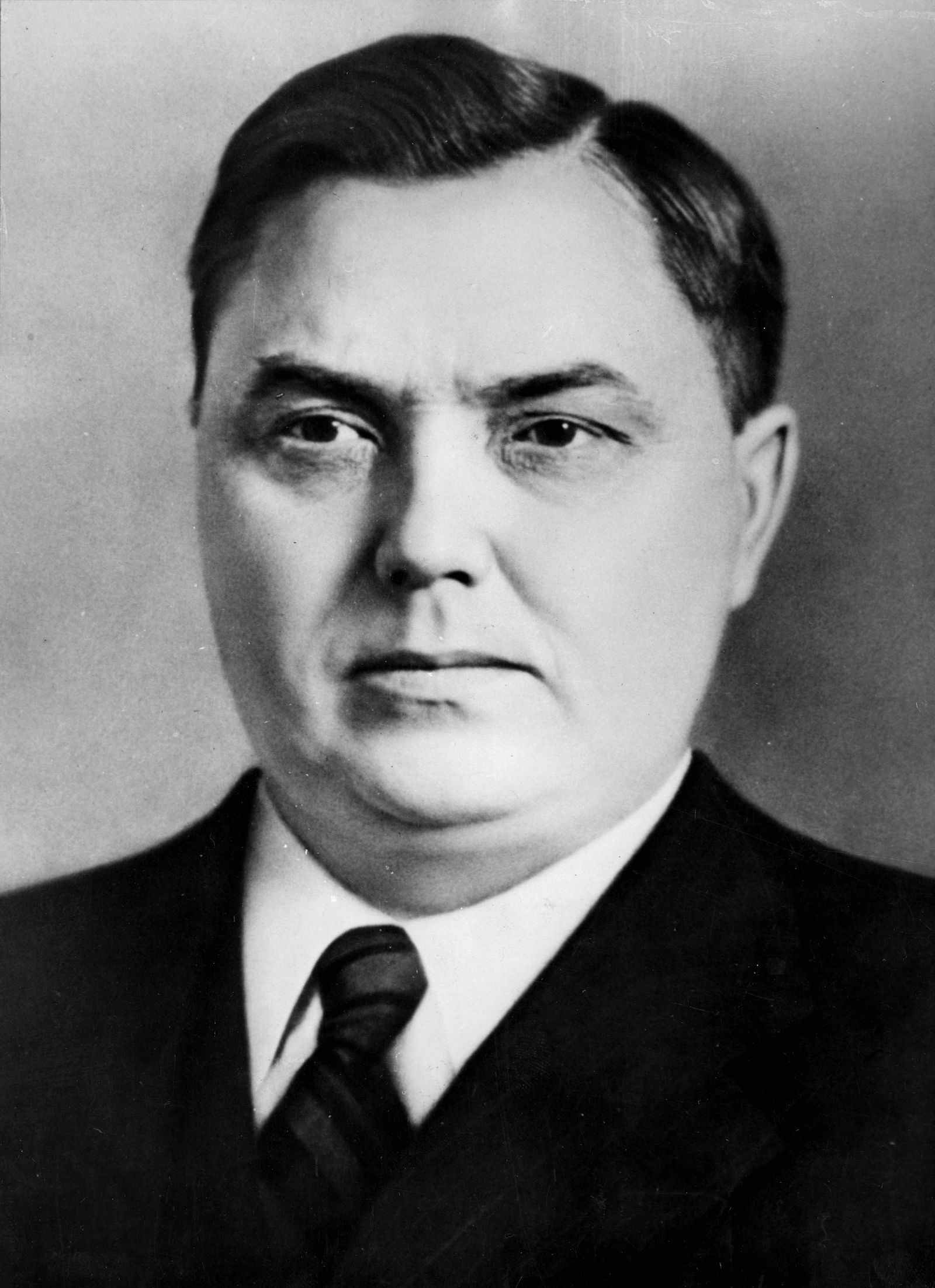
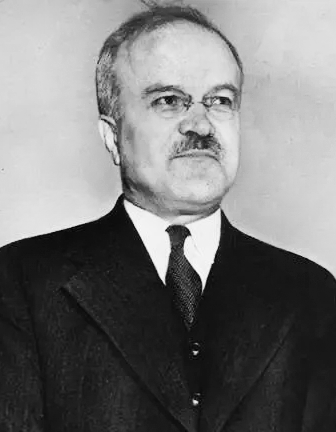
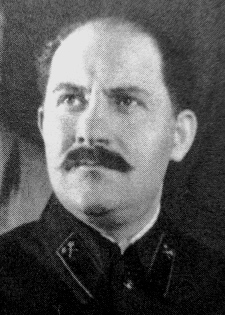
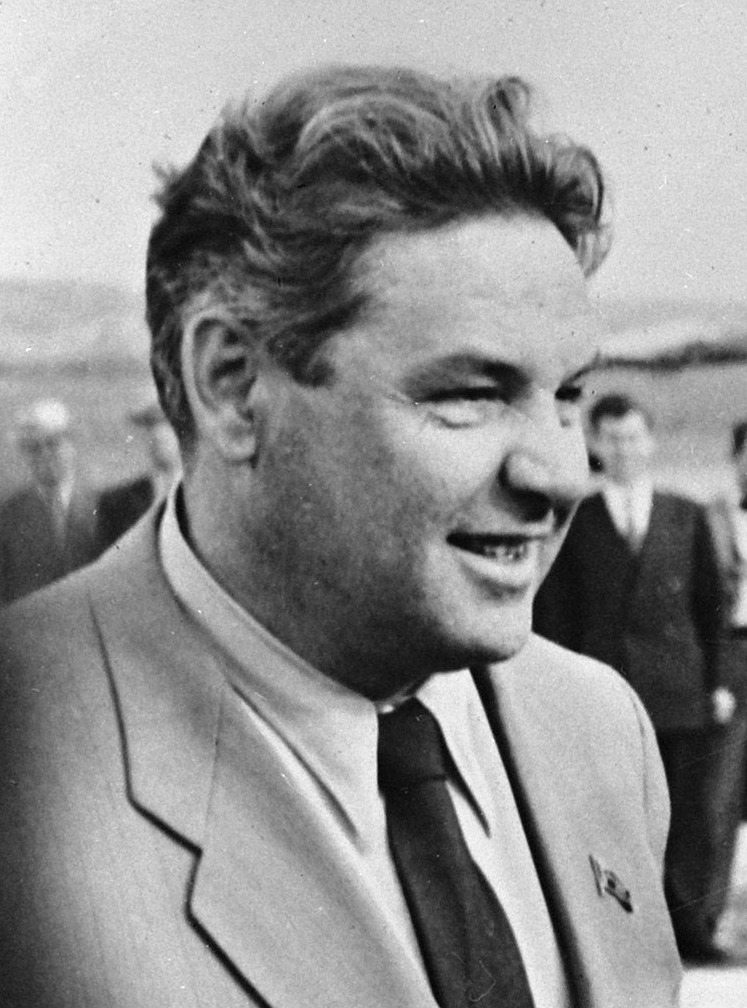
Top row (L–R): Georgy Malenkov, Vyacheslav Molotov
Bottom row (L–R): Lazar Kaganovich, Dmitri Shepilov

On June 18, 1957, the leaders of the group – Malenkov, Molotov and Kaganovich – were joined at the last minute by Foreign Minister Dmitri Shepilov, whom Kaganovich had convinced that the group had a majority. Although they did not have a majority in the entire Presidium of the CPSU Central Committee, they had a majority of the Presidium's 11 full members, who were the only ones that could vote. In the Presidium, the group's proposal to replace Khrushchev as First Secretary with Premier Nikolai Bulganin won with 7 to 4 votes in which Malenkov, Molotov, Kaganovich, Bulganin, Voroshilov, Pervukhin and Saburov supported and Khrushchev, Mikoyan, Suslov and Kirichenko opposed Khrushchev, however argued that only the plenum of the Central Committee could remove him from office, and when word of his imminent repudiation leaked out, Moscow members of the Central Committee (many of whom had been promoted by Khrushchev) besieged the Presidium and demanded the convening of the Central Committee. At an extraordinary session of the Central Committee held on June 22, Khrushchev argued that his opponents were an "anti-party group".

Khrushchev had the approval of the military, headed by Minister of Defense Georgy Zhukov. At that plenary session of the Central Committee Zhukov supported Khrushchev, and used the military to bring in supporters of Khrushchev to convince people to support him. He made a bitter speech, accusing the group of having blood on their hands over Stalin's atrocities. Zhukov emphasized that the Red Army supported Khrushchev: "The Army is against this resolution and not even a tank will leave its position without my order!" In the end of the power struggle, Khruschev was reaffirmed in his position as First Secretary.

== Aftermath ==
Malenkov, Molotov, Kaganovich, and Shepilov were vilified in the press and deposed from their party and government positions by a June 29, 1957 decree of the Plenum of the Central Committee of the CPSU. They were given relatively unimportant positions:

- Molotov was sent as ambassador to Mongolia
- Malenkov became director of a hydroelectric plant in Kazakhstan
- Kaganovich became director of a small potash works in the Urals
- Shepilov became head of the Economics Institute of the Kyrgyzstan Academy of Sciences.

In 1958, Premier Bulganin, the intended beneficiary of the "anti-party group", was forced to retire and Khrushchev became Premier as well.

In 1961, in the wake of further de-Stalinization, Molotov, Malenkov, Kaganovich, and Shepilov were expelled from the Communist Party altogether and all lived mostly quiet lives from then on. Shepilov was allowed to rejoin the party by Khrushchev's successor Leonid Brezhnev in 1976 but remained on the sidelines.

Khrushchev also deposed Defense Minister Zhukov in October 1957. Zhukov had assisted Khrushchev against the anti-party group, but the two developed significant political differences in the following months. Khrushchev alleged Bonapartism as a justification for Zhukov's removal.

As a result of the incident, Khrushchev's position within the international Communist bloc became insecure for a time, so he needed the support of the Chinese Communist Party and Mao Zedong. The CCP traded its support for Khrushchev for Soviet nuclear weapons technology. The Agreement on New Technology for National Defence was signed in October of that year.

== See also ==
- The Gang of Four in China
- The Natolin faction in Poland
- 1965 Bulgarian coup d'état attempt
