= Gennady Kazmin =

Soviet politician (1934–2018)

Personal details
- Born: Gennady Petrovich Kazmin; 29 August 1934 Valuyki, Kursk Oblast, RSFSR, Soviet Union
- Died: 28 January 2018 (aged 83) Khakassia, Russia

Gennady Petrovich Kazmin (Russian: Геннадий Петрович Казьмин; 29 August 1934 – 28 January 2018) was a Soviet party worker, the first secretary of the Krasnoyarsk Krai Committee of the CPSU (1990–91), and the first secretary of the Khakass regional committee of the CPSU (1987–1990).

== Early life ==
He was born on August 29, 1934, in the town of Valuiki, Belgorod oblast. At the age of 20, after graduating from the Novooskolsky Agricultural Technical College, he was sent by Komsomol to the development of virgin lands in the Minderlinskaya MTS of the Krasnoyarsk Krai. He worked as a mechanic, then as a brigadier. He was elected second and then first secretary of the Sukhobuzimsky Komsomol.

== Political career ==
In 1959, at the age of 24, he was elected chairman of the collective farm "Path of Lenin". After the reorganization of the collective farms, he worked as the chief engineer of the Minderlinsky sovkhoz, the director of the Zykovsky sovkhoz of the Yemelyanovsky District. In December 1962 he was elected first secretary of the Uyarsky District Committee of the CPSU. He became the youngest district leader in the USSR, which was once mentioned by Khrushchev himself at the All-Union meeting of agricultural workers in the Kremlin.

In December 1967 he was elected first secretary of the Kansky District Committee. In 1972 he was appointed head of the Krasnoyarsk Krai Administration of State Farms, and was simultaneously elected a member of the executive committee of the Krasnoyarsk Krai Council.

Since January 1978 he worked as the first deputy chairman of the regional executive committee of the Khakas Autonomous Oblast. In 1987 he was elected secretary, and from October 30, 1987, workes as first secretary of the Khakass regional committee of the CPSU.

On August 26, 1990, was elected first secretary of the Krasnoyarsk Krai Committee of the CPSU.

On November 11, 1991, he terminated his powers in connection with the dissolution of the CPSU as a result of the August 1991 coup.

In subsequent years he worked as the general director in joint-stock companies "Enisejkuzlitmash" and "Krasnoyarsk-Conversion".

For 40 years he was elected deputy of the Krasnoyarsk Krai and Khakass regional councils. He was a People's Deputy of the USSR.

He graduated from the Krasnoyarsk State Agrarian University and the Moscow Higher Party School.

== Sources ==
- Казьмин Геннадий Петрович
- Последний советский губернатор
