= Minsk Regional Committee of the Communist Party of Belarus =

Political organization in the Byelorussian SSR

The Minsk Regional Committee of the Communist Party of Belarus, commonly referred to as the Minsk CPB obkom, was the highest authority in the Minsk Region of the Byelorussian SSR in the Soviet Union.

The position of First Secretary was created in 1938. The First Secretary was considered the de facto governor of the Minsk region. The First Secretary was appointed by the Politburo.

== First Secretaries ==
| Name | Term of Office | |
| Name | Start | End |
|---|---|---|
| Alexander Matveev | 1938 | March 1941 |
| AI Kolyshkin | March 1941 | June 26, 1941 |
| Vasily Kozlov | July 7, 1941 | January 1948 |
| Yevgeny Bugayov | January 1948 | 1949 |
| Vasily Chernyshov | 1949 | 1950 |
| Kirill Mazurov | 1950 | September 1953 |
| Leonid Lubennikov | September 1953 | 1955 |
| Fedor Surganov | 1955 | August 1956 |
| Vasily Shauro | August 1956 | 1960 |
| Sergei Pritytsky | 1960 | 1962 |
| (Industrial) Anton Nosilovsky | January 1963 | December 1964 |
| (Rural) Dmitry Tyabut | January 1963 | December 1964 |
| Ivan Polyakov | December 1964 | March 1977 |
| Vladimir Mikulich | March 1977 | March 29, 1985 |
| Anatoly Malofeyev | March 29, 1985 | December 5, 1990 |
| Anatoly Bychek | December 5, 1990 | August 25, 1991 |

== See also ==
- Communist Party of Byelorussia
- Byelorussian Soviet Socialist Republic
