= Dmitri Shepilov =

Soviet politician and statesman

- Дмитрий Шепилов
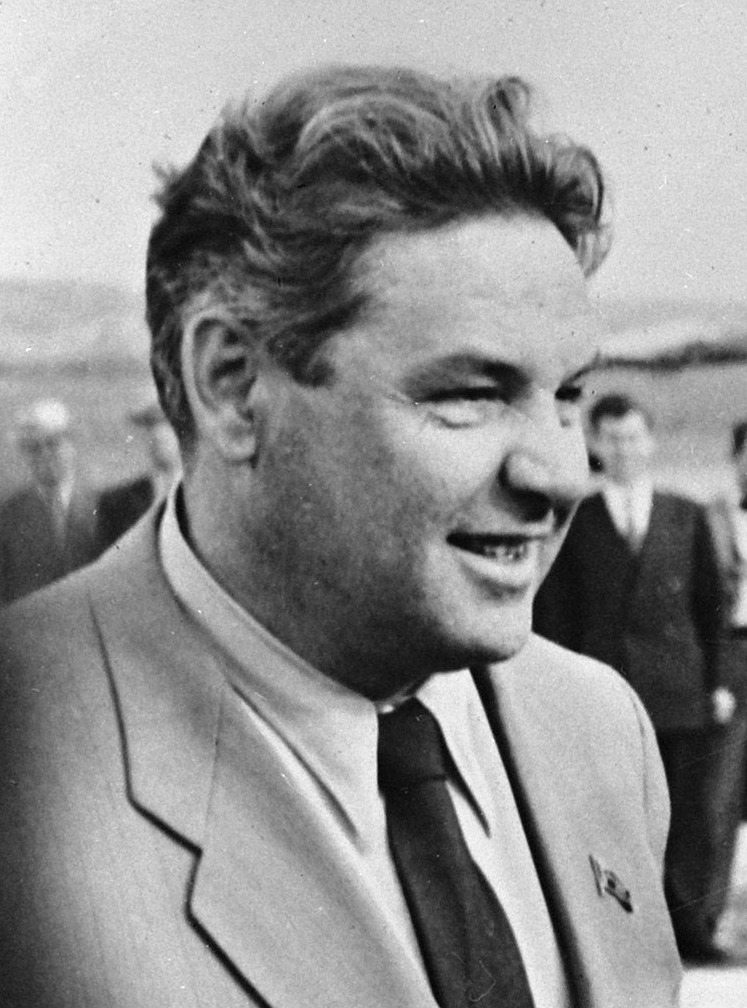
- Shepilov in 1955

Minister of Foreign Affairs
- In office 1 June 1956 – 15 February 1957
- Premier: Nikolai Bulganin
- Preceded by: Vyacheslav Molotov
- Succeeded by: Andrei Gromyko

Editor-in-chief of Pravda
- In office 1952–1956
- Preceded by: Leonid Ilichev
- Succeeded by: Pavel Satyukov

Head of the Propaganda Department of the Central Committee
- In office 20 July 1949 – 27 October 1952
- Preceded by: Post established (Mikhail Suslov as Propaganda and Agitation Department head)
- Succeeded by: Mikhail Suslov

Candidate member of the 20th Presidium
- In office 27 February 1956 – 29 June 1957

Member of the 19th, 20th Secretariat
- In office 14 February 1957 – 29 June 1957
- In office 12 July 1955 – 24 December 1956

Personal details
- Born: Dmitri Trofimovich Shepilov; 5 November [O.S. 23 October] 1905 Ashgabat, Russian Empire
- Died: 18 August 1995 (aged 89) Moscow, Russia
- Party: Communist Party of the Soviet Union (1926–1962, 1976–1982)
- Profession: Economist

Dmitri Trofimovich Shepilov (Russian: Дми́трий Трофи́мович Шепи́лов, Dmitrij Trofimovič Šepilov; 5 November [O.S. 23 October] 1905 – 18 August 1995) was a Soviet economist, lawyer and politician who served as Minister of Foreign Affairs. He joined the abortive plot to oust Nikita Khrushchev from power in 1957, and was denounced and removed from power. Rehabilitated after Khrushchev's downfall, he lived a largely peaceful retirement.

== Early career ==
Dmitri Shepilov was born in Ashgabat (current capital of Türkmenistan) in the Transcaspian Oblast of the Russian Empire in a working-class family of Russian ethnicity. He graduated from the Law Faculty of the Moscow State University in 1926 and was sent to work in Yakutsk, where he worked as a deputy prosecutor and acting prosecutor for Yakutia. In 1928–1929 Shepilov worked as an assistant regional prosecutor in Smolensk. In 1931–1933 Shepilov studied at the Institute of Red Professors in Moscow while simultaneously working as the "responsible secretary" of the magazine On the Agrarian Front. After graduating in 1933, Shepilov was made head of the political department of a sovkhoz. In 1935 he was made Deputy Chief of the Sector of Agricultural Science of the Central Committee of the Communist Party of the Soviet Union.

In 1937 Shepilov became a Doctor of Science and was made the Scientific Secretary of the Institute of Economics of the Soviet Academy of Sciences. He also taught economics in Moscow's colleges between 1937 and 1941.

Shortly after the beginning of Operation Barbarossa, Shepilov joined the People's Militia in July 1941 and was a Political commissar of its Moscow component during the Battle of Moscow in 1941–1942. In 1942–1943 he was the political commissar of the 23rd Guards Army and in 1944–1946 of the 4th Guards Army, ending the war with the rank of Major General. Between May 1945 and February 1946, Shepilov was one of the top Soviet officials in Vienna during the early stages of the Soviet occupation of eastern parts of Austria.

== Post-war ==
In February 1946, Shepilov was appointed deputy head of the Propaganda and Agitation Department of the Soviet Army's Main Political Directorate. On 2 August 1946 he became the head of the propaganda department of the main Communist Party daily Pravda.

In mid-1947, the head of the Propaganda and Agitation Department of the Communist Party Central Committee Georgy Aleksandrov and his deputies were subject to public criticism for being insufficiently vigilant and removed from their positions. Shepilov was appointed deputy chief of the Department on 18 September 1947. Since the new department head, Mikhail Suslov, had other responsibilities, Shepilov had almost complete control of the Department's day-to-day operations.

While in Moscow, Shepilov—famous for his near-eidetic memory, erudition and polished manners (reputedly, he could sing the whole of Tchaikovsky's opera The Queen of Spades from memory)—became an expert on Communist ideology and a protégé of Joseph Stalin's chief of Communist ideology Andrei Zhdanov. One of his first tasks was to assist Zhdanov in disciplining the Soviet Union's two greatest living composers, Dmitri Shostakovich and Sergei Prokofiev. He selected Shostakovich's Eighth and Ninth Symphonies and Prokofiev's opera War and Peace as the worst examples of what was wrong with Soviet music.

The appointment of Yuri Zhdanov, Andrei Zhdanov's son, to lead the Propaganda Department's Science Sector on 1 December 1947 put Shepilov in the delicate position of supervising his patron's son. The situation was made even more delicate by the fact that Yuri Zhdanov had just married Joseph Stalin's daughter Svetlana and the fact that Andrei Zhdanov, Stalin's closest advisor at the time, had many enemies in the Soviet leadership. When in April 1948 Shepilov approved Yuri Zhdanov's speech critical of Soviet biologist and Stalin favorite Trofim Lysenko, it started an intense political battle between Andrei Zhdanov on the one hand and his rivals who were using the episode to discredit Zhdanov.

On 1 July 1948, Zhdanov's main rival, Georgy Malenkov, took over at the Communist Party Secretariat while Zhdanov was sent on a two-month vacation, where he died. Shepilov, however, not only survived this change at the top, but even improved his position and was appointed as the next head of the Propaganda and Agitation Department on 10 July 1948. He also survived the next round of the intra-Party struggle associated with the removal and later execution of the Politburo member Nikolai Voznesensky. However, on 14 July 1949, he was censured by the Central Committee for allowing the Party's main theoretical magazine Bolshevik to publish Voznesensky's book on economics back when Voznesensky was still in power.

In 1952 Stalin put Shepilov in charge of writing a new Soviet economics textbook based on Stalin's recently published treatise Economic Problems of Socialism in the USSR. On 18 November 1952, after the 19th Communist Party Congress, Shepilov was appointed editor-in-chief of Pravda.

== Khrushchev's theoretician ==
After Stalin's death in March 1953, Shepilov became an ally and protégé of the new Soviet Communist Party leader Nikita Khrushchev, providing ideological support in the latter's struggle with the Soviet prime minister Georgy Malenkov. He was made a Corresponding Member of the Soviet Academy of Sciences the same year. While Malenkov argued in favor of producing more consumer goods, Shepilov emphasized the role of heavy and defense industries and characterized Malenkov's position as follows:

In generally understandable language this means: we surrender the advantage of forcing forward the development of heavy industry, machine construction, energy, chemical industry, electronics, jet technology, guidance systems, and so forth, to the imperialist world... It is hard to imagine a more anti-scientific, rotten theory, which could disarm our people more.

In February 1955 Malenkov was ousted as prime minister while Shepilov was elected one of the Secretaries of the Central Committee on 12 July 1955. He retained his Pravda post and became a senior Communist theoretician, contributing to Khrushchev's speech On the Cult of Personality and Its Consequences denouncing Stalin at the 20th Party Congress in February 1956.

== Minister of Foreign Affairs ==
Even though his field was Marxist-Leninist theory, Shepilov soon began to branch out into foreign policy. In September 1954, he accompanied Khrushchev on a visit to China. In late May 1955 he accompanied Khrushchev and the new Soviet prime minister Nikolai Bulganin to Yugoslavia to end the confrontation between the two countries which had begun in 1947–1948. According to Veljko Mićunović, then a member of the Yugoslav leadership:

At a lunch with Tito in 1955, Khrushchev several times asked Shepilov to confirm an incident he had just described. "Shepilov would remove the table napkin," Micunovic recalled, "stand up from the table, and as though he were reporting officially, would reply: 'Just so, Nikita Sergeyevich!' and sit down again. I found such behavior on Shepilov's part most unusual, as I did Khrushchev's in tolerating it".

In July 1955 Shepilov traveled to Egypt for talks with the Egyptian leader Gamal Abdel Nasser and secured an arms deal, which meant de facto Soviet recognition of Egypt's military regime and paved the way for subsequent Soviet-Egyptian alliance. It also signaled the Soviet Union's new found flexibility in dealing with non-Communist Third World countries in marked contrast to the intransigence of Stalin's years. On 27 February 1956, after the Soviet Communist Party's 20th Congress, Shepilov was made a candidate (non-voting) member of the Central Committee's Presidium (the Politburo's name in 1952–1966).

On 1 June 1956, Shepilov replaced Vyacheslav Molotov as the Soviet foreign minister. He gave up his Pravda post, but remained a Secretary of the Central Committee until 24 December. In early June 1956 Shepilov went back to Egypt and offered Soviet assistance in building the Aswan Dam, which was eventually accepted after a competing American-World Bank offer was withdrawn in July 1956 in the context of general deterioration of Western-Egyptian relations.

On 27 July 1956, one day after Nasser announced the nationalization of the Suez Canal Company, Shepilov met the Egyptian ambassador to the Soviet Union and offered general support for Egypt's position, which Khrushchev made official in his 31 July speech. Although the Soviet Union, as a signatory to the Constantinople Convention of 1888, was invited to the international conference on the Suez issue to be held in London in mid-August, Shepilov at first hesitated to accept the offer. However, once the decision to go was made, he led the Soviet delegation at the conference. Although the conference adopted the American resolution on the internationalization of the Suez Canal 18 votes against 4, Shepilov succeeded in striking an alliance with India, Indonesia and the Dominion of Ceylon as directed by the Soviet leadership.

Shepilov represented the Soviet Union at the UN Security Council during the 1956 Hungarian Revolution and the Suez Crisis in October–November 1956, although all important political decisions were made by Khrushchev and other top Soviet leaders.

== Post-ministership and resignation ==
On 14 February 1957 Shepilov was once again made Secretary of the Central Committee responsible for Communist ideology and the next day, Andrei Gromyko replaced him as the Soviet foreign minister.

In his new capacity, Shepilov oversaw the Second Composers' Congress in March 1957, which re-affirmed the decision of the First Congress (January 1948) to denounce Dmitri Shostakovich and other formalist composers. While delivering his speech to musicians, Shepilov mispronounced the name of the 19th century composer Rimsky-Korsakov, putting the stress on the syllable 'sak', which inspired Shostakovich to compose, privately, a satirical cantata The Anti-formalist Rayok (Peepshow) later that year (published in 1989). Its leading characters, Edinitsyn, Dvoikin, and Troikin (Onesyn, Twokin and Threekin) are transparently caricatures of Stalin, Zhdanov, and Shepilov. Shepilov also denounced jazz and rock music at the Congress, warning against "wild cave-man orgies" and the "explosion of basic instincts and sexual urges".

Shepilov was the only Central Committee Secretary to support an abortive plot to oust Khrushchev in June 1957, having reportedly joined the plot at the last moment when Lazar Kaganovich assured him that the plotters had a majority in the Presidium When Khrushchev prevailed at the Central Committee meeting, he was furious over what he saw as Shepilov's betrayal, and denounced him as 'Shepilov-who-joined-them'. Shepilov was ousted from the Central Committee on 29 June 1957 and vilified in the press as a member of the "Anti-Party Group" along with Molotov, Malenkov and Kaganovich, the only 3 other Soviet leaders whose participation in the coup attempt was made public at the time. Shepilov was friend of Marshal Georgy Zhukov and perhaps that was one of the reasons why a few months later Zhukov himself was removed from the office.

After losing his Central Committee positions, Shepilov was sent to Kyrgyzstan to head the Economics Institute of the local Academy of Sciences, but was soon demoted to deputy director. In 1960 he was recalled to Moscow, expelled from the Soviet Academy of Sciences and sent to the Soviet State Archive (Gosarkhiv) to work as a clerk, where he remained until his retirement in 1982. Following a second wave of denunciations of the "Anti-Party Group" at the 22nd Communist Party Congress in November 1961, Shepilov was expelled from the Communist Party on 21 February 1962. In 1976 he was allowed to re-join the Communist Party, but remained on the sidelines.

When Khrushchev was ousted as the Soviet leader in October 1964, Shepilov began working on his memoirs, a project which he continued intermittently until circa 1970. His papers were lost after his death at age 89 in Moscow, but were eventually found and published in 2001.

As a young man, Marion Barry chose "Shepilov" as his middle name. It is said that this was done in honor of the Soviet politician, but the reasons have been disputed.

== Bibliography ==
Autobiography

- Russian: Шепилов Д.Т. Непримкнувший. Воспоминания Издательство «ВАГРИУС», 2001. ISBN 5-264-00505-2
- Dmitrii Shepilov The Kremlin Scholar A Memoir of Soviet Politics Under Stalin and Khrushchev Yale University Press, cop. 2007

In English

- Speech at the 20th Congress of the C. P. S. U., 15 February 1956, Moscow, Foreign Languages Publishing House, 1956, 28 p.
- The Suez Problem, Moscow, Foreign Languages Publishing House, 1956, 95p.

In Russian

- Obshchestvennoe i lichnoe v kolkhozakh, 1939, 79p.
- Velikij sovetskij narod, Moscow, 1947, 47p.
- I. V. Stalin o kharaktere ekonomicheskikh zakonov sotsializma, Moscow, Gosudarstvennoe izdatel'stwo politicheckoj literatury, 1952, 35p.
- Pechat' v bor'be za dal'nejshij pod'em sel'skogo hozyajstva, Moscow, Gosudarstvennoe izdatel'stvo politicheckoj literatury, 1954, 63p.
- Za dal'nejshij rastsvet sovetskogo hudozhestvennogo tvorchestva, 1957, 31p.
- Dmitry Shepilov. "Vospominaniia" in Voprosy istorii 1998, no. 4.
- Шепилов Д.Т. Непримкнувший. Воспоминания Издательство «ВАГРИУС», 2001. ISBN 5-264-00505-2
- Biography
- K.A. Zalessky. Imperiya Stalina. Biograficheckij Entsiklopedicheskij slovar'. Moscow, Veche, 2000. ISBN 5-7838-0716-8

Political offices
Preceded by Vyacheslav Molotov	Minister of Foreign Affairs of the USSR; 1956–1957	Succeeded by Andrei Gromyko
