= Primorsky Regional Committee of the Communist Party of the Soviet Union =

The Primorsky Regional Committee of the Communist Party of the Soviet Union, commonly referred to as the Primorsky CPSU kraikom, was the position of highest authority in the Primorsky Krai, in the Russian SFSR of the Soviet Union. The position was created in 1922, and abolished on August 23, 1991. The First Secretary was a de facto appointed position usually by the Politburo or the General Secretary himself.

== List of First Secretaries of the Communist Party of Primorye ==
Name	Term of Office		Life years
Name	Start	End	Life years
First Secretaries of the Oblast Committee of the Communist Party
?	1922	1927	
D.P. Trofimov	1927		
Boris Pokhvalinskiy	192?	1929	1893–1938
V.P. Starannikov	1929	1930	1893–?
?	1930	1932	
Konstantin Pshenitsyn	1932	March 7, 1934	1892–1938
Pavel Tanygin	March 7, 1934	January 1937	
Nikolay Myakinen	January 1937	1937	1893–1938
Vladimir Sidorov	1937	October 1937	
P.F. Mitrakov (Note: Acting)	1937	June 1938	
?	June 1938	October 1938	
First Secretaries of the Kray Committee of the Communist Party
Nikolay Pegov (Note: Acting to February 21, 1939)	October 1938	February 1947	1905–1991
Nikolay Organov	February 1947	September 1952	1901–1982
Dmitriy Melnik	September 1952	March 1955	1912–1969
Nikolay Shatalin	March 1955	January 1956	1904–1984
Terentii Shtykov	January 22, 1956	May 1959	1907–1964
Vasiliy Chernyshev (Note: For Industry December 1962 – December 1964)	May 1959	March 18, 1969	1908–1969
Mikhail Kuznetsov (Note: For Agriculture)	December 1962	December 1964	1912–?
Viktor Lomakin	March 18, 1969	April 8, 1984	1926–
Dmitriy Gagarov	April 8, 1984	January 14, 1989	1938–1989
Aleksey Volyntsev	January 14, 1989	April 19, 1990	1936–
Anatoliy Golovizin (Note: Acting to May 1990)	April 19, 1990	August 23, 1991	1939–

== See also ==
- Primorsky Krai

== Sources ==
- World Statesmen.org
