= Gomel Regional Committee of the Communist Party of Byelorussia =

Former regime in the Byelorussian SSR

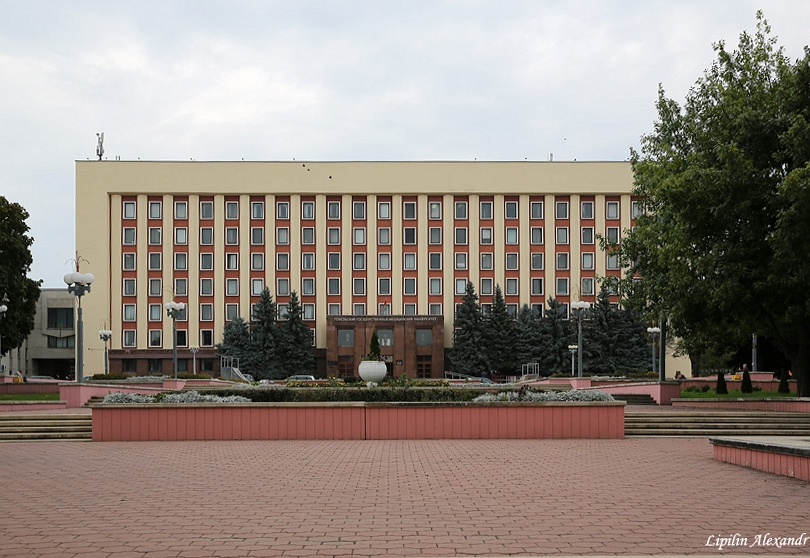
The building of the committee, now the building of Gomel State Medical University.

The Gomel Regional Committee of the Communist Party of Belarus, commonly referred to as the Gomel CPB Obkom, was the highest authority in the Gomel Region of the Byelorussian SSR in the Soviet Union. The position was created on January 15, 1938, and abolished on 25 August 1991. The First Secretary was considered the de facto governor of the Minsk region. The First Secretary was appointed by the Politburo.

== First Secretaries ==
Name	Term of Office	
Name	Start	End
Flavian Zhizhenkov	January 15, 1938	August 19, 1941
Ilya Kozhara	August 19, 1941	November 1943
Flavian Zhizhenkov	November 1943	1946
Ivan Tour	1946	January 1948
Nikolai Avkhimovich	January 1948	October 1951
Zahar Golodushko	October 1951	1955
Dmitry Fomichev	1955	December 1957
Ivan Polyakov	December 1957	December 1964
Valentin Yazykovich	December 1964	October 1969
Viktor Gvozdev	October 1969	October 1978
Yuri Khousainov	October 1978	July 1982
Anatoly Malofeyev	July 1982	March 29, 1985
Alexei Kamay	March 29, 1985	October 28, 1989
Alexander Grakhovsky	October 28, 1989	July 22, 1991
Vladimir Shaplyko	July 22, 1991	August 25, 1991
