= Kaliningrad Regional Committee of the Communist Party of the Soviet Union =

The Kaliningrad Regional Committee of the Communist Party of the Soviet Union, commonly referred to as the Kaliningrad CPSU obkom, was the position of highest authority in the Kaliningrad Oblast, (Note: Until 1945, Kaliningrad Oblast was the northern part of former German Province of East Prussia, in the Free State of Prussia) in the Russian SFSR of the Soviet Union. The position was created on April 7, 1946, and abolished on August 23, 1991. The First Secretary was a de facto appointed position usually by the Politburo or the General Secretary himself.

== List of First Secretaries of the Communist Party of Kaliningrad ==
Name	Term of Office		Life years
Name	Start	End	Life years
First Secretaries of the Oblast Committee of the Communist Party
Pyotr Ivanov (Note: Acting)	April 7, 1946	June 18, 1947	1906–1947
Vladimir Scherbakov	June 18, 1947	July 4, 1951	1909–1985
Vasily Chernyshev	July 4, 1951	May 22, 1959	1908–1969
Fyodor Markov	May 22, 1959	June 10, 1961	1910–1978
Nikolay Konovalov	June 10, 1961	January 14, 1984	1907–1993
Dmitry Romanin	January 14, 1984	September 7, 1989	1929–1996
Yury Semyonov	September 7, 1989	August 23, 1991	1938–2024

== See also ==
- Kaliningrad Oblast
