= Sakhalin Regional Committee of the Communist Party of the Soviet Union =

The Sakhalin Regional Committee of the Communist Party of the Soviet Union, commonly referred to as the Sakhalin CPSU obkom, was the position of highest authority in the Sakhalin Oblast, (Note: Until 1945, the Sakhalin Oblast encompassed only the northern part of the island of Sakhalin. The southern part was ruled by the Empire of Japan, as the Karafuto Prefecture) in the Russian SFSR of the Soviet Union. The position was created in July 1925, and abolished in August 1991. The First Secretary was a de facto appointed position usually by the Politburo or the General Secretary himself.

== List of First Secretaries of the Communist Party of Sakhalin ==
| Name | Term of Office | | Life years |
| Name | Start | End | Life years |
First Secretaries of the Okrug Committee of the Communist Party
| Nikolay Rudakov | July 1925 | June 1926 | |
| Nikolay Sedov | June 1926 | April 1927 | |
| Filipp Konyukhov | April 1927 | February 1930 | |
| Nikolay Ivanov | March 1930 | October 20, 1932 | 1894–1938 |
First Secretaries of the Oblast Committee of the Communist Party
| Nikolay Ivanov | October 20, 1932 | April 17, 1934 | 1894–1938 |
| Pavel Ulyansky | April 17, 1934 | November 14, 1937 | 1898–1938 |
| ? | November 14, 1937 | March 4, 1938 | |
| Fyodor Bespalko (Note: Acting to May 1938) | March 4, 1938 | September 24, 1938 | 1901–? |
| Grigoriy Shatalin | February 9, 1939 | June 21, 1940 | 1911–? |
| Aleksey Spridonov | June 21, 1940 | December 8, 1943 | 1909–1988 |
| Ivan Chizhov | December 8, 1943 | August 4, 1945 | 1899–? |
| Dmitriy Melnik | August 4, 1945 | June 15, 1951 | 1912–1969 |
| Pyotr Cheplakov | June 15, 1951 | August 25, 1960 | 1906–1985 |
| Pavel Leonov | August 1960 | December 23, 1978 | 1918–1992 |
| Pyotr Tretyakov | December 23, 1978 | June 17, 1988 | 1927– |
| Viktor Bondarchuk | June 17, 1988 | October 24, 1989 | 1936– |
| Viktor Zhigailo | October 24, 1989 | August 1991 | 1940– |

== See also ==
- Sakhalin Oblast
