= Rostov Regional Committee of the Communist Party of the Soviet Union =

The Rostov Regional Committee of the Communist Party of the Soviet Union, commonly referred to as the Rostov CPSU obkom, was the position of highest authority in the Rostov Oblast, in the Russian SFSR of the Soviet Union. The position was created in 1920, and abolished in August 1991. The First Secretary was a de facto appointed position usually by the Politburo or the General Secretary himself.

== List of First Secretaries of the Communist Party of Rostov ==
Name	Term of Office		Life years
Name	Start	End	Life years
First Secretaries of the Oblast Committee of the Communist Party
?	1920	1922	
Nikolay Kolotilov	1922	1924	1885–1937
First Secretaries of the Kray Committee of the Communist Party
Anastas Mikoyan	May 1924	September 24, 1926	1895–1978
Grigol Ordzhonikidze	September 24, 1926	November 1926	1886–1937
Mikhail Chudov	November 1926	January 1928	1893–1937
Andrey Andreyev	November 1928	January 1931	1895–1971
Boris Sheboldayev	January 1931	January 7, 1937	1895–1937
Yefim Yevdokimov	January 1937	September 13, 1937	1891–1940
First Secretaries of the Oblast Committee of the Communist Party
Yefim Yevdokimov	September 13, 1937	May 1938	1891–1940
Boris Dvinsky	May 1938	September 1944	1894–1973
Pyotr Aleksandryuk	September 1944	August 1947	1904–1968
Nikolai Patolichev	August 1947	June 1950	1908–1989
Pyotr Pastushenko	June 1950	January 1952	1905–?
Nikolay Kiselyev	January 1952	January 12, 1960	1903–1983
Aleksey Kirichenko	January 12, 1960	June 15, 1960	1908–1975
Aleksandr Basov	June 15, 1960	August 15, 1962	1912–1988
Vladimir Skryabin (Note: For Agriculture January 1963 – December 1964)	August 15, 1962	December 1964	1908–1988
Georgiy Neronov (Note: For Industry)	January 1963	December 1964	1916–?
Mikhail Solomentsev	December 24, 1964	November 16, 1966	1913–2008
Ivan Bondarenko	November 16, 1966	July 25, 1984	1926–2009
Aleksandr Vlasov	July 25, 1984	January 24, 1986	1932–2002
Boris Volodin	January 25, 1986	April 5, 1990	1931–
Vitaly Suslin	April 5, 1990	August 1991	1937–1997

== See also ==
- Rostov Oblast
