= Nikita Khrushchev =

Leader of the Soviet Union from 1953 to 1964

- Никита Хрущёв
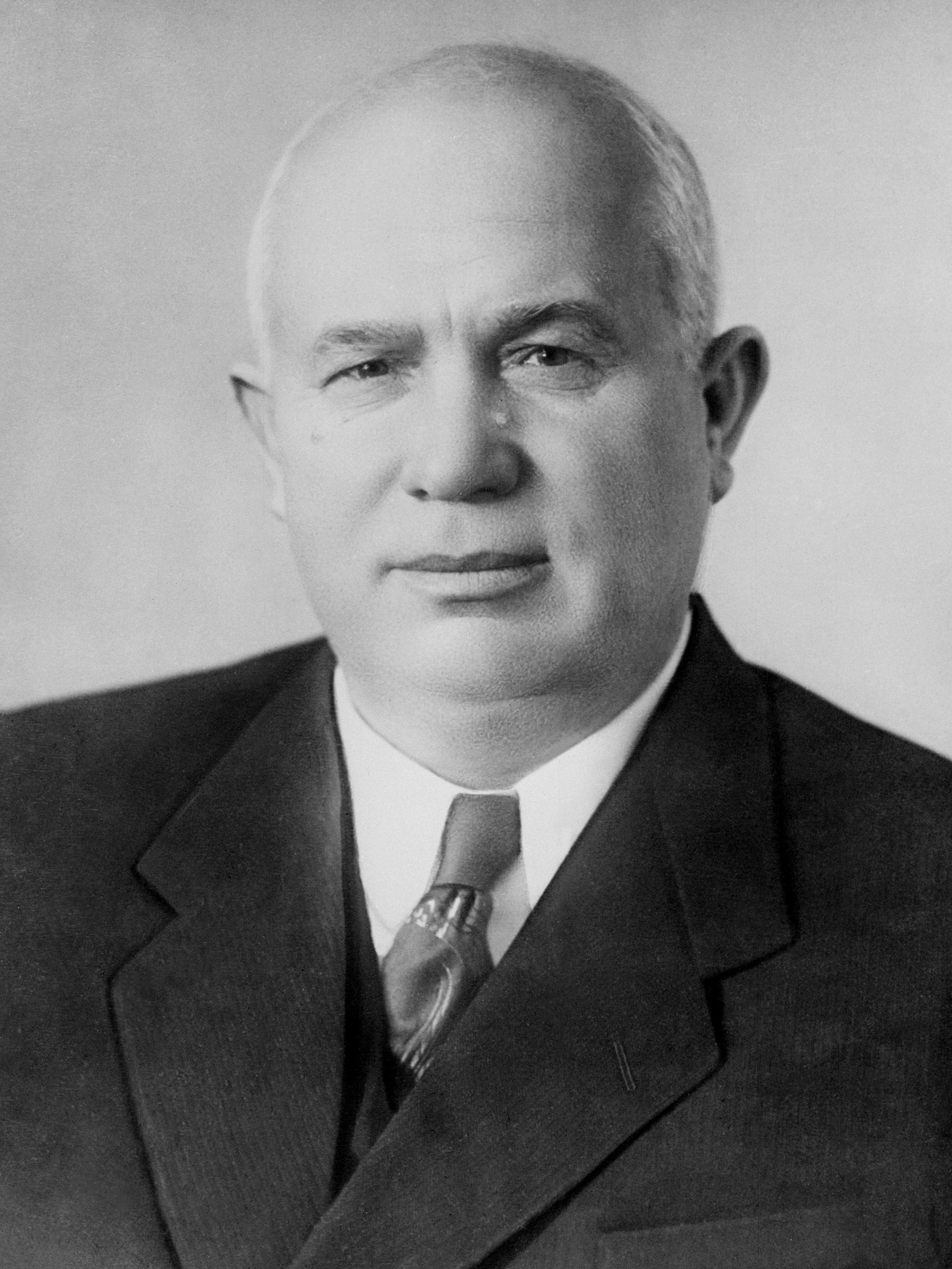
- Official portrait, 1954

First Secretary of the Communist Party of the Soviet Union
- In office 7 September 1953 – 14 October 1964
- Preceded by: Joseph Stalin (as General Secretary)
- Succeeded by: Leonid Brezhnev

Premier of the Soviet Union
- In office 27 March 1958 – 14 October 1964
- President: Kliment Voroshilov; Leonid Brezhnev; Anastas Mikoyan
- First Deputies: See list: Frol Kozlov; Alexei Kosygin; Dmitriy Ustinov; Lazar Kaganovich; Anastas Mikoyan
- Preceded by: Nikolai Bulganin
- Succeeded by: Alexei Kosygin

First Secretary of the Communist Party of Ukraine
- In office 26 December 1947 – 16 December 1949
- Preceded by: Lazar Kaganovich
- Succeeded by: Leonid Melnikov
- In office 27 January 1938 – 3 March 1947
- Preceded by: Stanislav Kosior
- Succeeded by: Lazar Kaganovich

Personal details
- Born: 15 April [O.S. 3 April] 1894 Kalinovka, Dmitriyevsky Uyezd, Russia
- Died: 11 September 1971 (aged 77) Moscow, Soviet Union
- Resting place: Novodevichy Cemetery
- Party: CPSU (Note: Founded as the RSDLP(b) in 1912; renamed the RCP(b) in 1918, AUCP(b) in 1925, and CPSU in 1952.) (1918–1964)
- Spouses: Yefrosinia Pisareva (m. 1914; died 1919) Nina Kukharchuk (m. 1965)
- Children: 5, including Leonid and Sergei
- Education: Industrial Academy
- Awards: Full list

Military service
- Allegiance: Russian SFSR; Soviet Union
- Branch/service: Red Army
- Years of service: 1918–1921; 1941–1945
- Rank: Lieutenant general
- Commands: Soviet Armed Forces
- Battles/wars: Russian Civil War; World War II
- Central institution membership: 1939–1964: Full member, 18th, 19th, 20th, 22nd Presidium; 1949–1964: 18th, 19th, 20th, 22nd Secretariat; 1949–1952: 18th Orgburo; 1938–1939: Candidate member, 17th Politburo; 1934–1964: Full member, 17th, 18th, 19th, 20th, 22nd Central Committee; Other offices held: 1956–1964: Chairman, Bureau of the Central Committee of the Russian SFSR; 1949–1953: First Secretary, Moscow Regional Committee; 1944–1947: Chairman, Ukrainian Council of Ministers; 1938–1947: First Secretary, Kiev Regional Committee; 1938–1947: First Secretary, Kiev City Committee; 1935–1938: First Secretary, Moscow Regional Committee; 1934–1938: First Secretary, Moscow City Committee; Leader of the Soviet Union: ← Stalin; Brezhnev →

Nikita Sergeyevich Khrushchev (Note: /ˈkrʊʃtʃɛf, ˈkruːʃ-, -tʃɒf/; Russian: Никита Сергеевич Хрущёв, IPA: [nʲɪˈkʲitə sʲɪrˈɡʲe(j)ɪvʲɪtɕ xrʊˈɕːɵf].) (15 April [O.S. 3 April] 1894 – 11 September 1971) was the first secretary of the Communist Party of the Soviet Union from 1953 to 1964 and the chairman of the Council of Ministers from 1958 to 1964. As leader of the Soviet Union, he shocked the world by denouncing his predecessor Joseph Stalin, embarking on a campaign of de-Stalinization, and presiding over the Cuban Missile Crisis in 1962.

Born in a village near Kursk, Khrushchev was employed as a metal worker during his youth and was a political commissar in the Russian Civil War. Under the sponsorship of Lazar Kaganovich, he rose through the ranks of the Soviet hierarchy. During Stalin's rule, he actively supported the Great Purge and approved thousands of arrests, and in 1938 was sent to govern the Ukrainian SSR, where he continued the purges. During World War II, Khrushchev was again a commissar, serving as an intermediary between Stalin and his generals. He was also present at the Battle of Stalingrad, a fact in which he took great pride. After the war, Khrushchev returned to Ukraine before eventually being recalled to Moscow as one of Stalin's close advisers.

On 5 March 1953, the death of Stalin triggered a power struggle in which Khrushchev ultimately emerged victorious upon consolidating his authority as First Secretary of the party's Central Committee and eliminating his rival Lavrentiy Beria. On 25 February 1956, at the 20th Party Congress, he delivered the "Secret Speech", which denounced Stalin's purges and ushered in a more open era in Soviet history. His domestic policies, aimed at bettering the lives of ordinary Soviet citizens, often met with mixed results, especially in agriculture. However, assisted by his ally Anastas Mikoyan, he successfully oversaw the rehabilitation of numerous victims of Stalinist repression. Hoping eventually to rely on missiles for national defense, Khrushchev ordered major cuts in conventional forces. Despite such cuts, Khrushchev's time in office saw the tensest years of the Cold War, culminating in the 1962 Cuban Missile Crisis.

As leader of the Soviet Union, Khrushchev enjoyed considerable popularity during the late 1950s due to the successful launching of Sputnik in 1957 as well as favorable outcomes in the 1956 Suez Crisis, 1957 Syrian Crisis, and the 1960 U-2 incident. However, by the early 1960s, Khrushchev's hold on power had been significantly weakened by his domestic policy failures and handling of the Cuban Missile Crisis. As a result, his rivals consolidated enough support among the nomenklatura to oust him from the Soviet leadership on 14 October 1964. Following his forced retirement, Khrushchev spent much of his time composing a series of lengthy memoirs which were smuggled to the West and published in part in 1970. He died the next year in his dacha.

== Early life ==
Nikita Sergeyevich Khrushchev was born on 15 April 1894 (Note: Soviet reports list his birth date as 17 April (5 April old style) (in fact Khrushchev did not know his exact birthday, but he usually celebrated it on this day). However, the discovery of his birth certificate has caused biographers to accept the 15 April date. See Tompson 1995, p. 2 and Таубман У. Хрущёв. — М.: Молодая гвардия, 2005. — С. 36, 704.) in Kalinovka, a Russian village in what is now the Khomutovsky District of Kursk Oblast, near the present Ukrainian border. At the time, Kalinovka was part of Dmitriyevsky Uyezd in the Kursk Governorate of the Russian Empire. His parents, Sergei Khrushchev and Kseniya Khrushcheva were poor Russian peasants, and had a daughter two years Nikita's junior, Irina. Sergei Khrushchev was employed in a number of positions in the Donbas area of far eastern Ukraine, working as a railwayman, as a miner, and laboring in a brick factory. Wages were much higher in the Donbas than in the Kursk region, and Sergei Khrushchev generally left his family in Kalinovka, returning when he had enough money. When Nikita was six or seven, the family moved to Yuzovka (now Donetsk) for about a year before returning to Kalinovka.

Kalinovka was a peasant village; Khrushchev's teacher, Lydia Shevchenko, later stated that she had never seen a village as poor. Nikita worked as a herdsboy from an early age. He was schooled for a total of four years, part in the village school and part under Shevchenko's tutelage in Kalinovka's state school. According to Khrushchev's memoirs, Shevchenko was a freethinker who upset the villagers by not attending church, and when her brother visited, she gave Khrushchev books which had been banned by the Imperial Government. She urged Nikita to seek further education, but family finances did not permit this.

In 1908, Sergei Khrushchev moved to the Donbas city of Yuzovka; fourteen-year-old Nikita followed later that year, while Kseniya Khrushcheva and her daughter came after. Yuzovka, which was renamed Stalino in 1924 and Donetsk in 1961, was at the heart of one of the most industrialized areas of the Russian Empire. After working briefly in other fields, Khrushchev's parents found Nikita a place as a metal fitter's apprentice. Upon completing that apprenticeship, the teenage Khrushchev was hired by a factory. He lost that job when he collected money for the families of the victims of the Lena Goldfields massacre, and was hired to mend underground equipment by a mine in nearby Ruchenkovo, where his father was the union organizer, and he helped distribute copies and organize public readings of Pravda. He later stated that he considered emigrating to the United States for better wages, but did not do so.

When World War I broke out in 1914, Khrushchev was exempt from conscription because he was a skilled metal worker. He was employed by a workshop that serviced ten mines, and he was involved in several strikes that demanded higher pay, better working conditions, and an end to the war. In 1914, he married Yefrosinia Pisareva, daughter of the lift operator at the Rutchenkovo mine. In 1915, they had a daughter, Yulia, and in 1917, a son, Leonid.

After the abdication of Tsar Nicholas II in 1917, the new Russian Provisional Government in Petrograd had little influence over Ukraine. Khrushchev was elected to the worker's council (or soviet) in Rutchenkovo, and in May he became its chairman. He did not join the Bolsheviks until 1918, a year in which the Russian Civil War, between the Bolsheviks and a coalition of opponents known as the White Army, began in earnest. His biographer, William Taubman, suggests that Khrushchev's delay in affiliating himself with the Bolsheviks was because he felt closer to the Mensheviks who prioritized economic progress, whereas the Bolsheviks sought political power. In his memoirs, Khrushchev indicated that he waited because there were many groups, and it was difficult to keep them all straight.

In March 1918, as the Bolshevik government concluded a separate peace with the Central Powers, the Germans occupied the Donbas and Khrushchev fled to Kalinovka. In late 1918 or early 1919, he was mobilized into the Red Army as a political commissar. The post of political commissar had recently been introduced as the Bolsheviks came to rely less on worker activists and more on military recruits; its functions included the indoctrination of recruits in the tenets of Bolshevism, and promoting troop morale and battle readiness. Beginning as commissar to a construction platoon, Khrushchev rose to become commissar to a construction battalion and was sent from the front for a two-month political course. The young commissar came under fire many times, though many of the war stories he would tell in later life dealt more with cultural awkwardness rather than combat. In 1921, the civil war ended, and Khrushchev was demobilized and assigned as commissar to a labor brigade in the Donbas, where he and his men lived in poor conditions.

The wars had caused widespread devastation and famine, and one of the victims was Khrushchev's wife, Yefrosinia, who died of typhus in Kalinovka while Khrushchev was in the army. The commissar returned for the funeral and, loyal to his Bolshevik principles, refused to allow his wife's coffin to enter the local church. With the only way into the churchyard through the church, he had the coffin lifted and passed over the fence into the burial ground, shocking the village.

== Party official ==
=== Donbas years ===
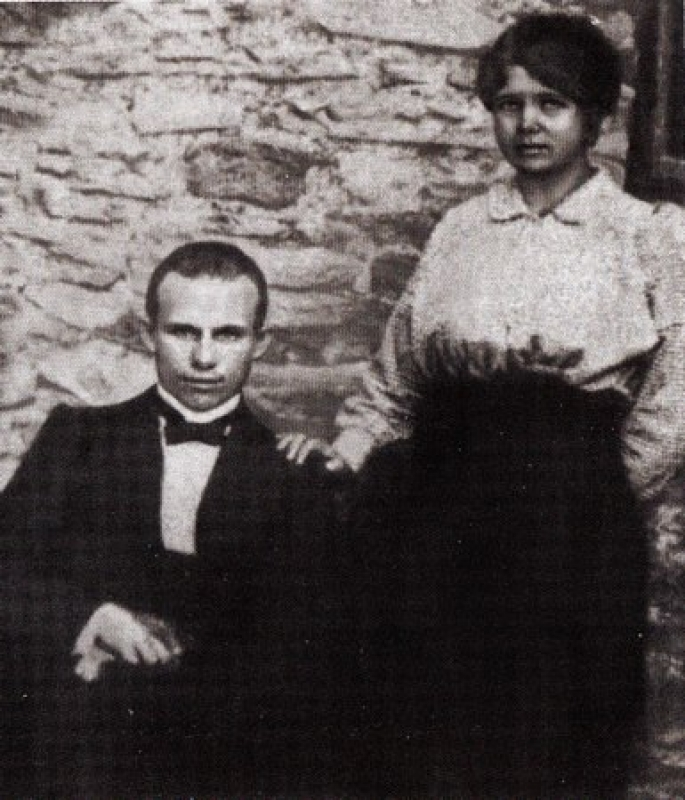
Khrushchev and his first wife Euphrasinia (Yefrosinia) in 1916

Through the intervention of a friend, Khrushchev was assigned in 1921 as assistant director for political affairs for the Rutchenkovo mine in the Donbas region, where he had previously worked. There were as yet few Bolsheviks in the area. At that time, the movement was split by Lenin's New Economic Policy. While Khrushchev's responsibility lay in political affairs, he involved himself in the practicalities of resuming full production at the mine after the chaos of the war years. He helped restart the machines (key parts and papers had been removed by the pre-Soviet mine-owners) and he wore his old mine outfit for inspection tours.

Khrushchev was highly successful at the Rutchenkovo mine, and in mid-1922 he was offered the directorship of the nearby Pastukhov mine. However, he refused the offer, seeking to be assigned to the newly established technical college (tekhnikum) in Yuzovka, though his superiors were reluctant to let him go. As he had only four years of formal schooling, he applied to the training program (rabfak, short for Рабочий факультет / Rabotchyi Fakultyet, or Worker's Faculty) attached to the tekhnikum that was designed to bring undereducated students to high-school level, a prerequisite for entry into the tekhnikum. While enrolled in the rabfak, Khrushchev continued his work at the Rutchenkovo mine.

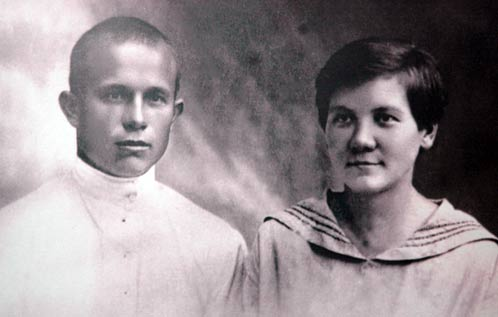
Khrushchev's second wife (though they only officially married in 1965) was Ukrainian-born Nina Petrovna Kukharchuk, whom he met in 1922. Photo taken in 1924

One of his teachers later described him as a poor student. He was more successful in advancing in the Communist Party; soon after his admission to the rabfak in August 1922, he was appointed party secretary of the entire tekhnikum, and became a member of the bureau—the governing council—of the party committee for the town of Yuzovka (renamed Stalino in 1924). He briefly joined supporters of Leon Trotsky against those of Joseph Stalin over the question of party democracy. All of these activities left him with little time for his schoolwork, and while he later said he had finished his rabfak studies, it is unclear whether this was true.

According to William Taubman, Khrushchev's studies were aided by Nina Petrovna Kukharchuk, a well-educated Party organizer and daughter of well-to-do Ukrainian peasants. The family was poor, according to Nina's own recollections. The two lived together as husband and wife for the rest of Khrushchev's life, though they never registered their marriage. They had three children together: daughter Rada was born in 1929, son Sergei in 1935, and daughter Elena in 1937.

In mid-1925, Khrushchev was appointed Party secretary of the Petrovo-Marinsky raikom, or district, near Stalino. The raikom was about 1,000 square kilometres (400 sq mi) in area, and Khrushchev was constantly on the move throughout his domain, taking an interest in even minor matters. In late 1925, Khrushchev was elected a non-voting delegate to the 14th Congress of the USSR Communist Party in Moscow.

=== Kaganovich protégé ===
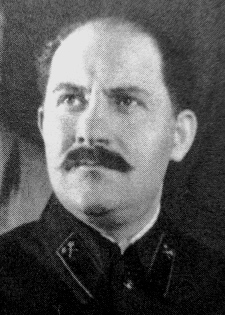
Lazar Kaganovich, one of the chief enforcers of Stalin's dictatorship and Khrushchev's main patron.

Khrushchev met Lazar Kaganovich as early as 1917. In 1925, Kaganovich became Party head in Ukraine and Khrushchev, falling under his patronage, was rapidly promoted. He was appointed second in command of Stalin's party apparatus in late 1926. Within nine months his superior, Konstantin Moiseyenko, was ousted, which, according to Taubman, was due to Khrushchev's instigation. Kaganovich transferred Khrushchev to Kharkov, then the capital of Ukraine, as head of the Organizational Department of the Ukrainian Party's Central Committee. In 1928, Khrushchev was transferred to Kiev, where he served as head of the organizational department, second-in-command of the Party organization there.

In 1929, Khrushchev again sought to further his education, following Kaganovich (now in the Kremlin as a close associate of Stalin) to Moscow and enrolling in the Stalin Industrial Academy. Khrushchev never completed his studies there, but his career in the Party flourished. When the school's Party cell elected a number of rightists to an upcoming district Party conference, the cell was attacked in Pravda. Khrushchev emerged victorious in the ensuing power struggle, becoming Party secretary of the school, arranging for the delegates to be withdrawn, and, afterward, purging the cell of the rightists. Khrushchev rose rapidly through the Party ranks, first becoming Party leader for the Bauman district, site of the academy, before taking the same position in the Krasnopresnensky district, the capital's largest and most important. By 1932, Khrushchev had become second in command, behind Kaganovich, of the Moscow city Party organization, and in 1934, he became Party leader for the city and a member of the Party's Central Committee. Khrushchev attributed his rapid rise to his acquaintance with fellow Academy student Nadezhda Alliluyeva, Stalin's wife. In his memoirs, Khrushchev stated that Alliluyeva spoke well of him to her husband. His biographer, William Tompson, downplays the possibility, stating that Khrushchev was too low in the Party hierarchy to enjoy Stalin's patronage and that if influence was brought to bear on Khrushchev's career at this stage, it was by Kaganovich.

While head of the Moscow city organization, Khrushchev superintended the construction of the Moscow Metro, a highly expensive undertaking, with Kaganovich in overall charge. Faced with an already-announced opening date of 7 November 1934, Khrushchev took considerable risks in the construction and spent much of his time down in the tunnels. When the inevitable accidents did occur, they were depicted as heroic sacrifices in a great cause. The Metro did not open until 1 May 1935, but Khrushchev received the Order of Lenin for his role in its construction. Later that year, he was selected as First Secretary of the Moscow Regional Committee which was responsible for Moscow oblast, a province with a population of 11 million.

=== Involvement in purges ===
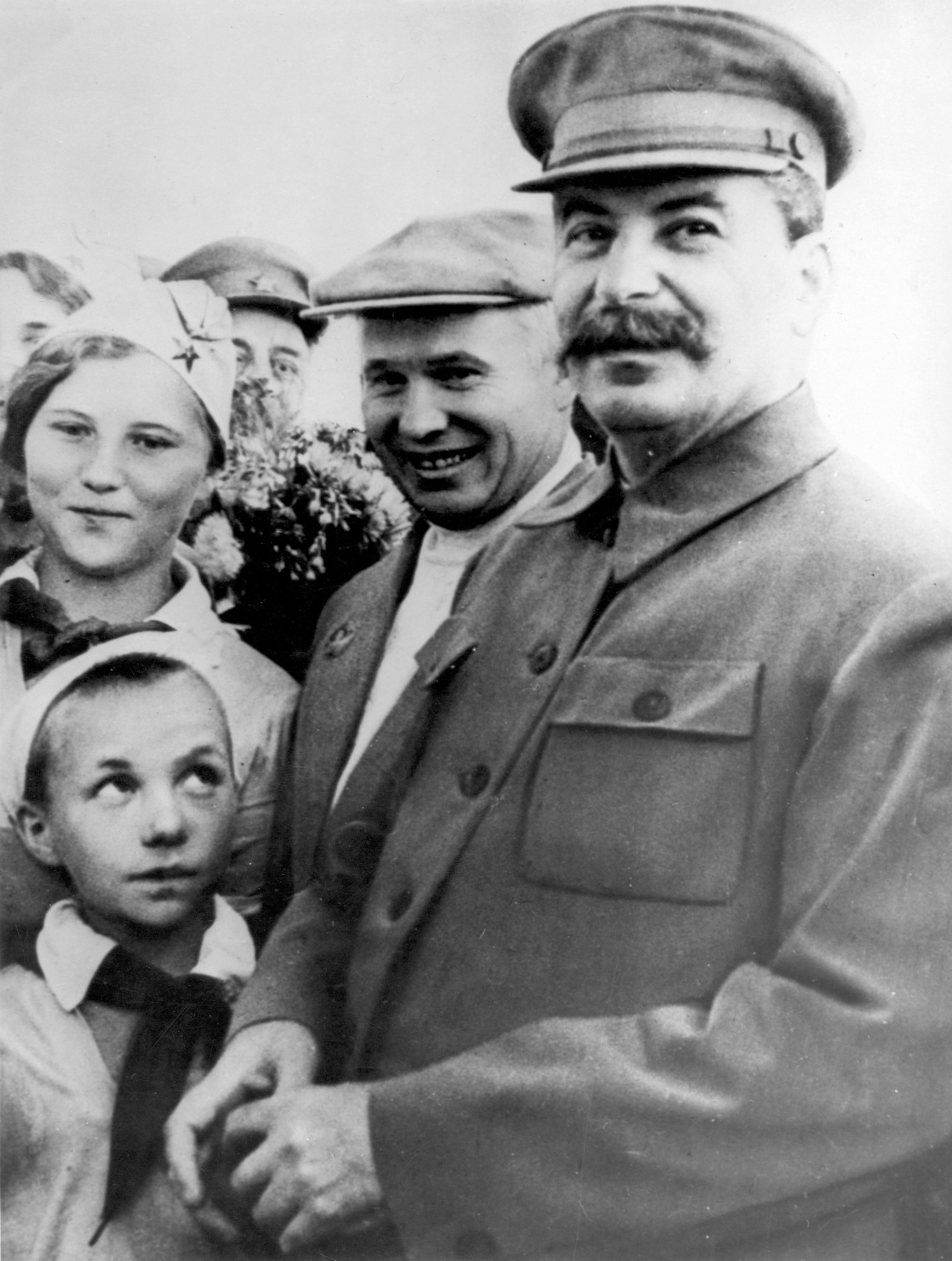
Khrushchev (second from right) poses for a photo alongside Joseph Stalin (far right) sometime during the 1930s.

Stalin's office records show meetings at which Khrushchev was present as early as 1932. The two increasingly built a good relationship, as far as having occasional personal meetings in Stalin's Dacha. Beginning in 1934, Stalin began a campaign of political repression known as the Great Purge, during which many were executed or sent to the GULAG camps. Central to this campaign were the Moscow Trials, a series of show trials of the purged top leaders of the party and the military. In 1936, as the trials proceeded, Khrushchev expressed his vehement support:

Everyone who rejoices in the successes achieved in our country, the victories of our party led by the great Stalin, will find only one word suitable for the mercenary, fascist dogs of the Trotskyite-Zinovievite gang. That word is execution.

Khrushchev assisted in the purge of many friends and colleagues in the Moscow oblast. Of 38 top Party officials in Moscow city and province, 35 were killed—the three survivors were transferred to other parts of the USSR. Of the 146 Party secretaries of cities and districts outside Moscow city in the province, only 10 survived the purges. In his memoirs, Khrushchev noted that almost everyone who worked with him was arrested. By Party protocol, Khrushchev was required to approve these arrests and did little or nothing to save his friends and colleagues.

Party leaders were given numerical quotas of "enemies" to be turned in and arrested. In June 1937, the Politburo set a quota of 35,000 enemies to be arrested in Moscow province; 5,000 of these were to be executed. In reply, Khrushchev asked that 2,000 wealthy peasants, or kulaks living in Moscow be killed in part fulfillment of the quota. In any event, only two weeks after receiving the order, Khrushchev was able to report to Stalin that 41,305 "criminal and kulak elements" had been arrested. Of the arrestees, according to Khrushchev, 8,500 deserved execution.

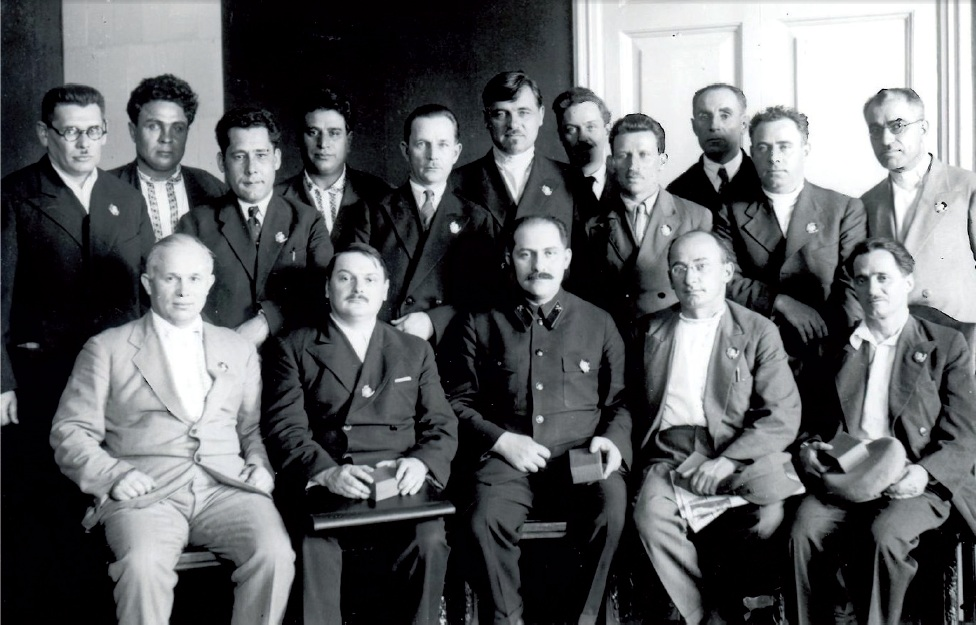
Regional party leaders in 1935. In the front row sits Nikita Khrushchev (Moscow), Andrei Zhdanov (Leningrad), Lazar Kaganovich (Ukraine), Lavrentiy Beria (Georgia), and Nestor Lakoba (Abkhazia) (behind him stands Mir Jafar Baghirov).

Khrushchev had no reason to think himself immune from the purges, and in 1937, confessed his own 1923 dalliance with Trotskyism to Kaganovich, who, according to Khrushchev, "blanched" (for his protégé's sins could affect his own standing) and advised him to tell Stalin. The dictator took the confession in his stride, and, after initially advising Khrushchev to keep it quiet, suggested that Khrushchev tell his tale to the Moscow party conference. Khrushchev did so, to applause, and was immediately reelected to his post. Khrushchev related in his memoirs that he was also denounced by an arrested colleague. Stalin told Khrushchev of the accusation personally. Khrushchev speculated in his memoirs that had Stalin doubted his reaction, he would have been categorized as an enemy of the people then and there. Nonetheless, Khrushchev became a candidate member of the Politburo on 14 January 1938 and a full member in March 1939.

External videos
- Khrushchev speech in 1937
- Khrushchev speech at the opening of the Moscow Metro

In late 1937, Stalin appointed Khrushchev as head of the Communist Party in Ukraine. Khrushchev left Moscow for Kiev, again the Ukrainian capital, in January 1938. Ukraine had been the site of extensive purges, with the murdered including professors in Stalino whom Khrushchev greatly respected. The high ranks of the Party were not immune; the Central Committee of Ukraine was so devastated that it could not convene a quorum. After Khrushchev's arrival, the pace of arrests accelerated. All but one member of the Ukrainian Politburo Organizational Bureau and Secretariat were arrested. Almost all government officials and Red Army commanders were replaced. During the first few months after Khrushchev's arrival, almost everyone arrested was executed.

Biographer William Taubman suggested that because Khrushchev was again unsuccessfully denounced while in Kiev, he must have known that some of the denunciations were not true and that innocent people were suffering. In 1939, Khrushchev addressed the Fourteenth Ukrainian Party Congress, saying "Comrades, we must unmask and relentlessly destroy all enemies of the people. But we must not allow a single honest Bolshevik to be harmed."

== World War II ==
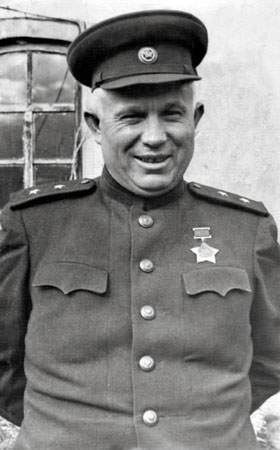
Nikita Khrushchev posing in a Red Army uniform following the Soviets' entry into the conflict.

=== Invasion of Poland and subsequent occupation ===
When Soviet troops, pursuant to the Molotov–Ribbentrop Pact, invaded the eastern portion of Poland on 17 September 1939, Khrushchev accompanied the troops at Stalin's direction. A large number of ethnic Ukrainians lived in the invaded area, much of which today forms the western portion of Ukraine. Many inhabitants initially welcomed the invasion, though they hoped that they would eventually become independent. Khrushchev's role was to ensure that the occupied areas voted for union with the USSR. Through a combination of propaganda, deception as to what was being voted for, and outright fraud, the Soviets ensured that the assemblies elected in the new territories would unanimously petition for union with the USSR. When the new assemblies did so, their petitions were granted by the USSR Supreme Soviet, and Western Ukraine became a part of the Ukrainian Soviet Socialist Republic on 1 November 1939. Clumsy actions by the Soviets, such as staffing Western Ukrainian organizations with Eastern Ukrainians, and giving confiscated land to collective farms (kolkhozes) rather than to peasants, soon alienated Western Ukrainians, damaging Khrushchev's efforts to achieve unity.

=== War against Germany ===
When Nazi Germany invaded the USSR, in June 1941, Khrushchev was still at his post in Kiev. Stalin appointed him a political commissar, and Khrushchev served on a number of fronts as an intermediary between the local military commanders and the political rulers in Moscow. Stalin used Khrushchev to keep commanders on a tight leash, while the commanders sought to have him influence Stalin.

As the Germans advanced, Khrushchev worked with the military to defend and save Kiev. Handicapped by orders from Stalin that under no circumstances should the city be abandoned, the Red Army was soon encircled by the Germans. While the Germans stated they took 655,000 prisoners, according to the Soviets, 150,541 men out of 677,085 escaped. Primary sources differ on Khrushchev's involvement. According to Marshal Georgy Zhukov, writing some years after Khrushchev fired and disgraced him in 1957, Khrushchev persuaded Stalin not to evacuate troops from Kiev. However, Khrushchev noted in his memoirs that he and Marshal Semyon Budyonny proposed redeploying Soviet forces to avoid the encirclement until Marshal Semyon Timoshenko arrived from Moscow with orders for the troops to hold their positions. Early Khrushchev biographer Mark Frankland suggested that Khrushchev's faith in his leader was first shaken by the Red Army's setbacks. Khrushchev stated in his memoirs:

But let me return to the enemy breakthrough in the Kiev area, the encirclement of our group, and the destruction of the 37th Army. Later, the Fifth Army also perished ... All of this was senseless, and from the military point of view, a display of ignorance, incompetence, and illiteracy. ... There you have the result of not taking a step backward. We were unable to save these troops because we didn't withdraw them, and as a result, we simply lost them. ... And yet it was possible to allow this not to happen.

In 1942, Khrushchev was on the Southwest Front, and he and Timoshenko proposed a massive counteroffensive in the Kharkov area. Stalin approved only part of the plan, but 640,000 Red Army soldiers were involved in the offensive. The Germans, however, had deduced that the Soviets were likely to attack at Kharkov, and set a trap. Beginning on 12 May 1942, the Soviet offensive initially appeared successful, but within five days the Germans had driven deep into the Soviet flanks, and the Red Army troops were in danger of being cut off. Stalin refused to halt the offensive, and the Red Army divisions were soon encircled by the Germans. The USSR lost about 267,000 soldiers, including more than 200,000 captured, and Stalin demoted Timoshenko and recalled Khrushchev to Moscow. While Stalin hinted at arresting and executing Khrushchev, he allowed the commissar to return to the front by sending him to Stalingrad.

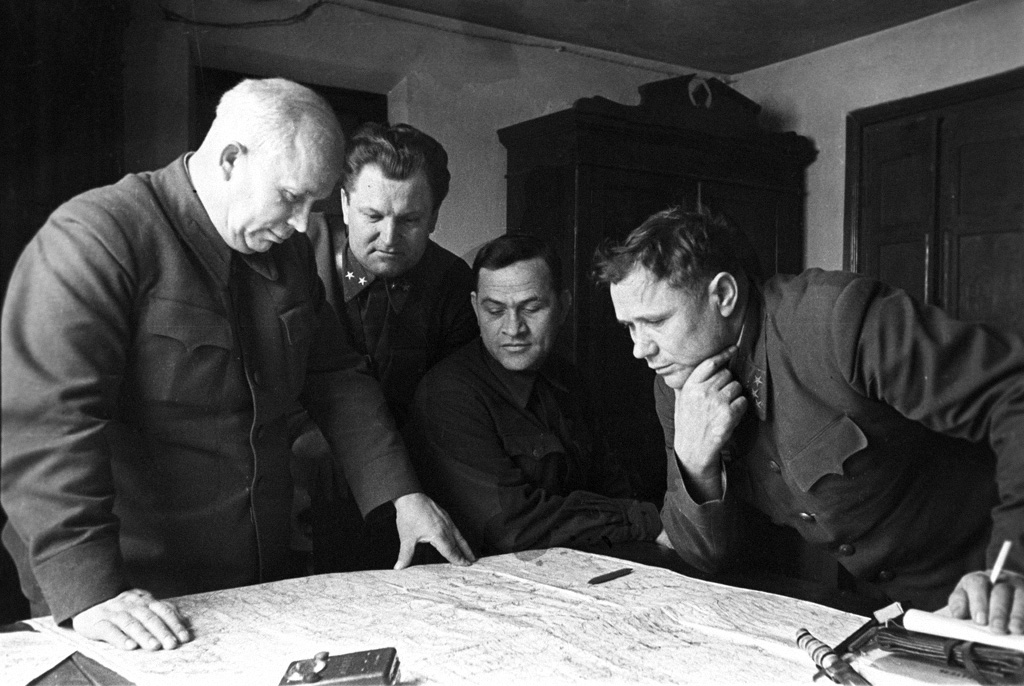
Khrushchev (left) on the Stalingrad Front

Khrushchev reached the Stalingrad Front in August 1942, soon after the start of the battle for the city. His role in the Stalingrad defense was not major—General Vasily Chuikov, who led the city's defense, mentions Khrushchev only briefly in a memoir published while Khrushchev was premier—but to the end of his life, he was proud of his role. Though he visited Stalin in Moscow on occasion, he remained in Stalingrad for much of the battle and was nearly killed at least once. He proposed a counterattack, only to find that Georgy Zhukov and other generals had already planned Operation Uranus, a plan to break out from Soviet positions and encircle and destroy the Germans; it was being kept secret. Before Uranus was launched, Khrushchev spent much time checking on troop readiness and morale, interrogating Nazi prisoners, and recruiting some for propaganda purposes.

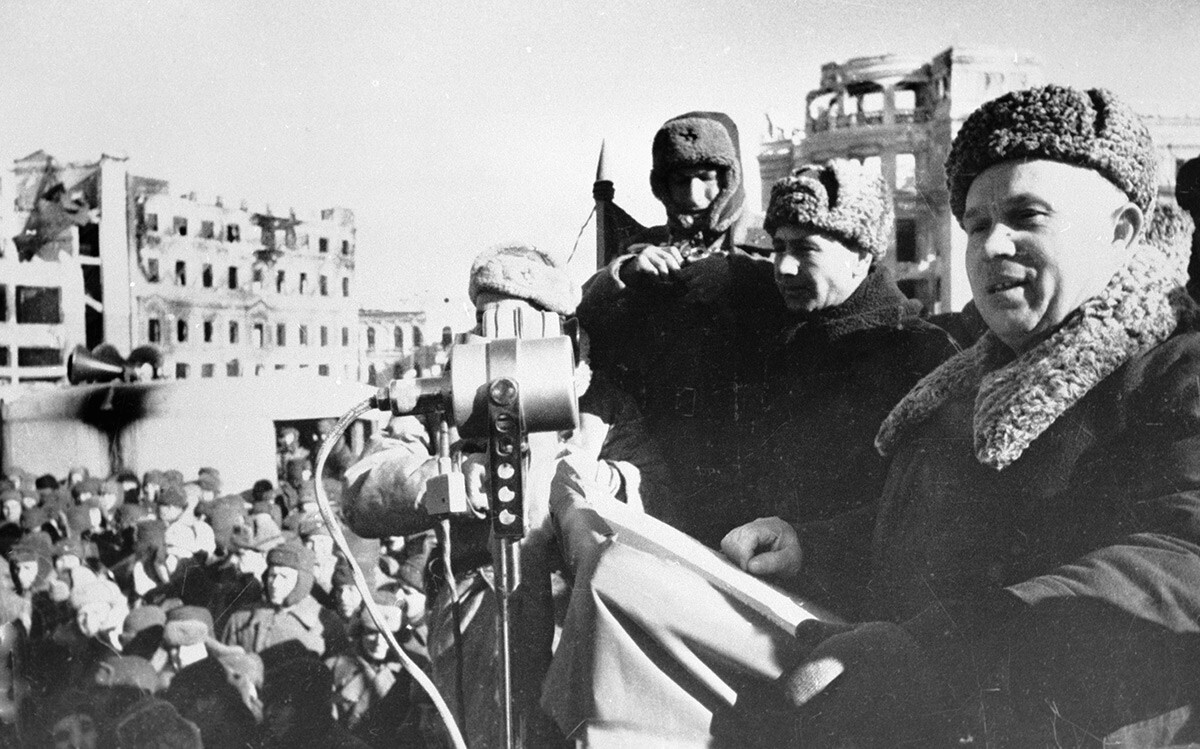
Khrushchev (right) speaking at a victory rally of Red Army soldiers in Stalingrad, 4 February 1943

Soon after Stalingrad, Khrushchev met with personal tragedy, as his son Leonid, a fighter pilot, was apparently shot down and killed in action on 11 March 1943. The circumstances of Leonid's death remain obscure and controversial, as none of his fellow fliers stated that they witnessed him being shot down, nor was his plane found or body recovered. One theory has Leonid surviving the crash and collaborating with the Germans, and when he was recaptured by the Soviets, Stalin ordering him shot despite Khrushchev pleading for his life. This supposed killing is used to explain why Khrushchev later denounced Stalin. While there is no supporting evidence for this account in Soviet files, some historians allege that Leonid Khrushchev's file was tampered with after the war. In later years, Leonid Khrushchev's wingmate stated that he saw his plane disintegrate, but did not report it. Khrushchev biographer Taubman speculates that this omission was most likely to avoid the possibility of being seen as complicit in the death of the son of a Politburo member. In mid-1943, Leonid's wife, Liuba Khrushcheva, was arrested on accusations of spying and sentenced to five years in a labor camp, and her son (by another relationship), Tolya, was placed in orphanages. Leonid's daughter, Yulia, was raised by Nikita Khrushchev and his wife.

After Uranus forced the Germans into retreat, Khrushchev served on other fronts of the war. He was attached to Soviet troops at the Battle of Kursk, in July 1943, which turned back the last major German offensive on Soviet soil. Khrushchev related that he interrogated an SS defector, learning that the Germans intended an attack—a claim dismissed by his biographer Taubman as "almost certainly exaggerated". He accompanied Soviet troops as they took Kiev in November 1943, entering the shattered city as Soviet forces drove out German troops. As Soviet forces met with greater success, driving the Nazis westwards towards Germany, Nikita Khrushchev became increasingly involved in reconstruction work in Ukraine. He was appointed Premier of the Ukrainian SSR in addition to his earlier party post, one of the rare instances in which the Ukrainian party and civil leader posts were held by one person.

According to Khrushchev biographer William Tompson, it is difficult to assess Khrushchev's war record, since he most often acted as part of a military council, and it is not possible to know the extent to which he influenced decisions. However, Tompson points to the fact that the few mentions of Khrushchev in military memoirs published during the Brezhnev era were generally favorable, at a time when it was "barely possible to mention Khrushchev in print in any context". Tompson suggests that these favorable mentions indicate that military officers held Khrushchev in high regard.

== Rise to power ==
=== Return to Ukraine ===
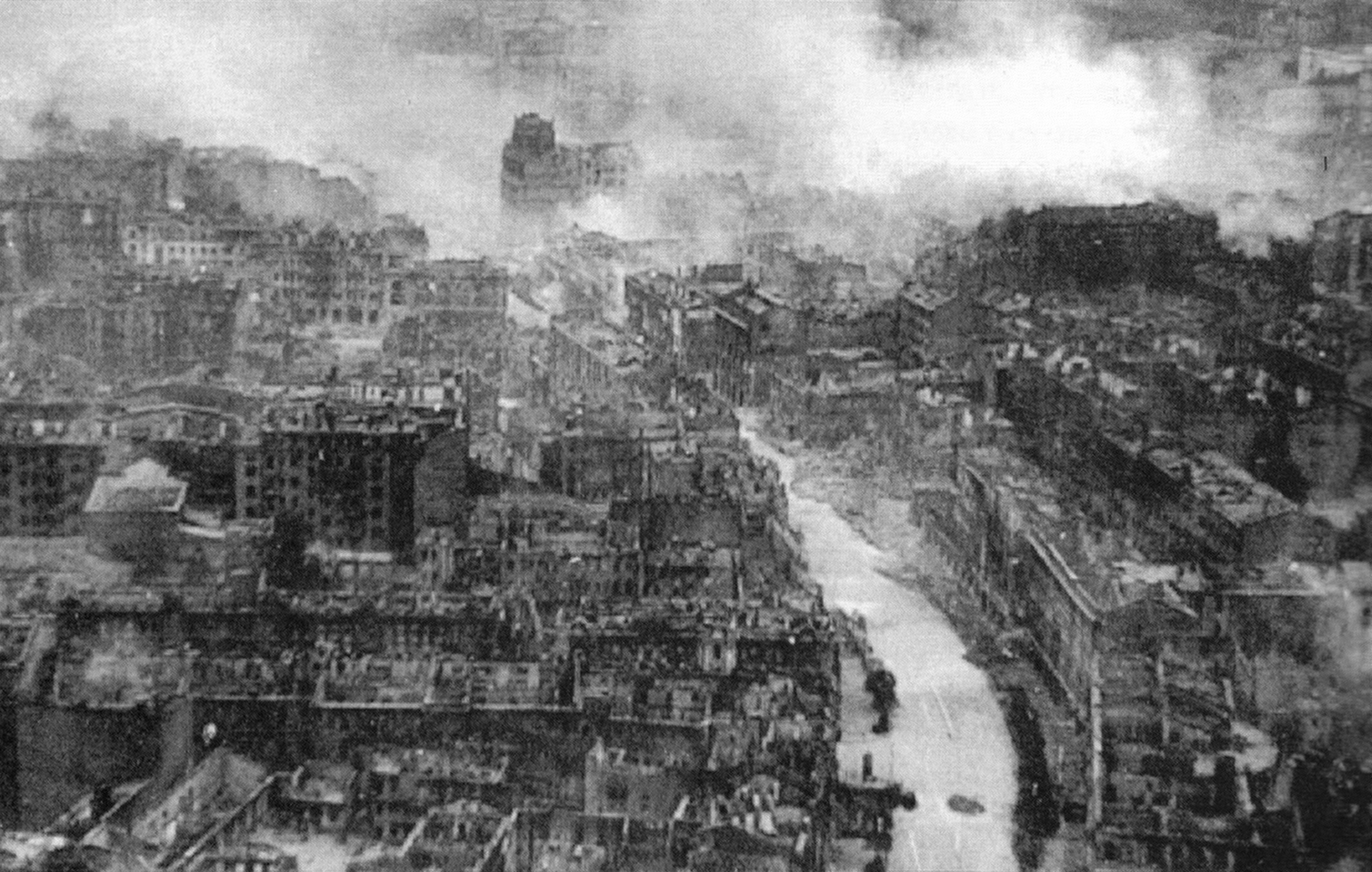
The Ukrainian capital, Kiev, after the Second World War

Almost all of Ukraine had been occupied by the Germans, and Khrushchev returned to his domain in late 1943 to find devastation. Ukraine's industry had been destroyed, and agriculture faced critical shortages. Even though millions of Ukrainians had been taken to Germany as workers or prisoners of war, there was insufficient housing for those who remained. One out of every six Ukrainians were killed in World War II.

Khrushchev sought to reconstruct Ukraine and complete the interrupted work of imposing the Soviet system on it, though he hoped that the purges of the 1930s would not recur. As Ukraine was recovered militarily, conscription was imposed; 750,000 men aged between nineteen and fifty were sent to join the Red Army. Other Ukrainians joined partisan forces, seeking an independent Ukraine. Khrushchev rushed from district to district through Ukraine, urging the depleted labor force to greater efforts. He made a short visit to his birthplace of Kalinovka, finding a starving population, with only a third of the men who had joined the Red Army having returned. Khrushchev did what he could to assist his hometown. Despite Khrushchev's efforts, in 1945, Ukrainian industry was at only a quarter of pre-war levels, and the harvest actually dropped from that of 1944, when the entire territory of Ukraine had not yet been retaken.

In an effort to increase agricultural production, the kolkhozes (collective farms) were empowered to expel residents who were not pulling their weight. Kolkhoz leaders used this as an excuse to expel their personal enemies, invalids, and the elderly, sending them to the eastern parts of the Soviet Union. Khrushchev viewed this policy as very effective and recommended its adoption elsewhere to Stalin. He also worked to impose collectivization on Western Ukraine. Lack of resources and armed resistance by partisans slowed the process. The partisans, many of whom fought as the Ukrainian Insurgent Army (UPA), were gradually defeated, as Soviet police and military reported killing 110,825 "bandits" and capturing a quarter million more between 1944 and 1946. About 600,000 Western Ukrainians were arrested between 1944 and 1952, with one-third executed and the remainder imprisoned or exiled to the east.

The war years of 1944 and 1945 had seen poor harvests, and 1946 saw intense drought strike Ukraine and Western Russia. Despite this, collective and state farms were required to turn over 52% of the harvest to the government. The Soviet government sought to collect as much grain as possible to supply communist allies in Eastern Europe. Khrushchev set the quotas at a high level, leading Stalin to expect an unrealistically large quantity of grain from Ukraine. Food was rationed—but non-agricultural rural workers throughout the USSR were given no ration cards. The inevitable starvation was largely confined to remote rural regions and was little noticed outside the USSR. Khrushchev, realizing the desperate situation in late 1946, repeatedly appealed to Stalin for aid, to be met with anger and resistance. When letters to Stalin had no effect, Khrushchev flew to Moscow and made his case in person. Stalin finally gave Ukraine limited food aid, and money to set up free soup kitchens. However, Khrushchev's political standing had been damaged, and in February 1947, Stalin suggested that Lazar Kaganovich be sent to Ukraine to "help" Khrushchev. The following month, the Ukrainian Central Committee removed Khrushchev as party leader in favor of Kaganovich, while retaining him as premier.

Soon after Kaganovich arrived in Kiev, Khrushchev fell ill and was barely seen until September 1947. In his memoirs, Khrushchev indicates he had pneumonia; some biographers have theorized that Khrushchev's illness was entirely political, out of fear that his loss of position was the first step towards downfall and demise. However, Khrushchev's children remembered their father as having been seriously ill. Once Khrushchev was able to get out of bed, he and his family took their first vacation since before the war, to a beachfront resort in Latvia. Khrushchev, though, soon broke the beach routine with duck-hunting trips, and a visit to the new Soviet Kaliningrad, where he toured factories and quarries. By the end of 1947, Kaganovich had been recalled to Moscow and the recovered Khrushchev had been restored to the First Secretaryship. He then resigned the Ukrainian premiership in favor of Demyan Korotchenko, Khrushchev's protégé.

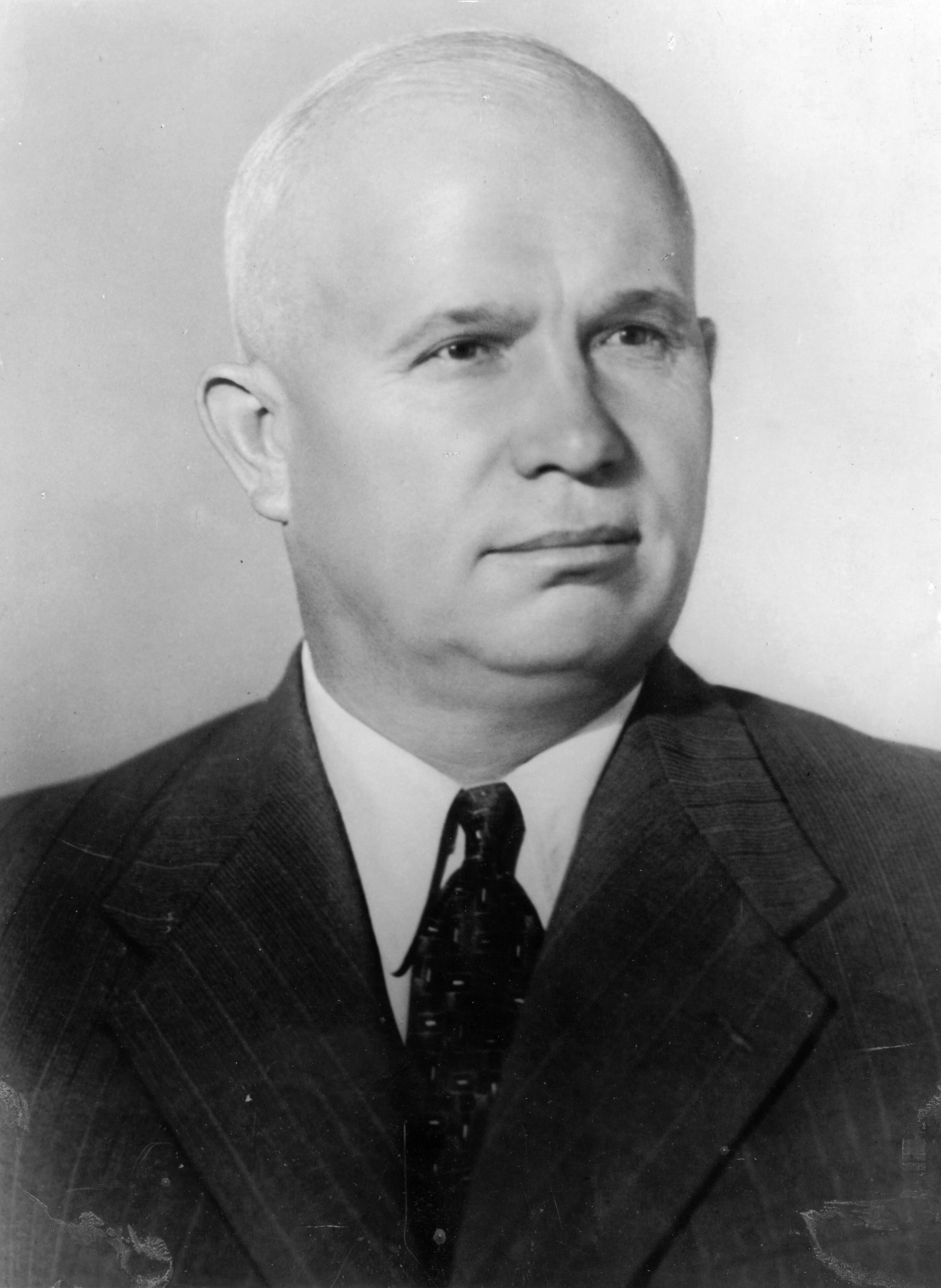
Khrushchev c. 1948

Khrushchev's final years in Ukraine were generally peaceful, with industry recovering, Soviet forces overcoming the partisans, and 1947 and 1948 seeing better-than-expected harvests. Collectivization advanced in Western Ukraine, and Khrushchev implemented more policies that encouraged collectivization and discouraged private farms. These sometimes backfired, however: a tax on private livestock holdings led to peasants slaughtering their stock. With the idea of eliminating differences in attitude between town and countryside and transforming the peasantry into a "rural proletariat", Khrushchev conceived the idea of the "agro-town". Rather than agricultural workers living close to farms, they would live further away in larger towns which would offer municipal services such as utilities and libraries. He completed only one such town before his December 1949 return to Moscow; he dedicated it to Stalin as a 70th birthday present.

In his memoirs, Khrushchev spoke highly of Ukraine:

I'll say that the Ukrainian people treated me well. I recall warmly the years I spent there. This was a period full of responsibilities, but pleasant because it brought satisfaction ... But far be it from me to inflate my significance. The entire Ukrainian people was exerting great efforts ... I attribute Ukraine's successes to the Ukrainian people as a whole. I won't elaborate further on this theme, but in principle, it's very easy to demonstrate. I'm Russian myself, and I don't want to offend the Russians.

=== Stalin's final years ===
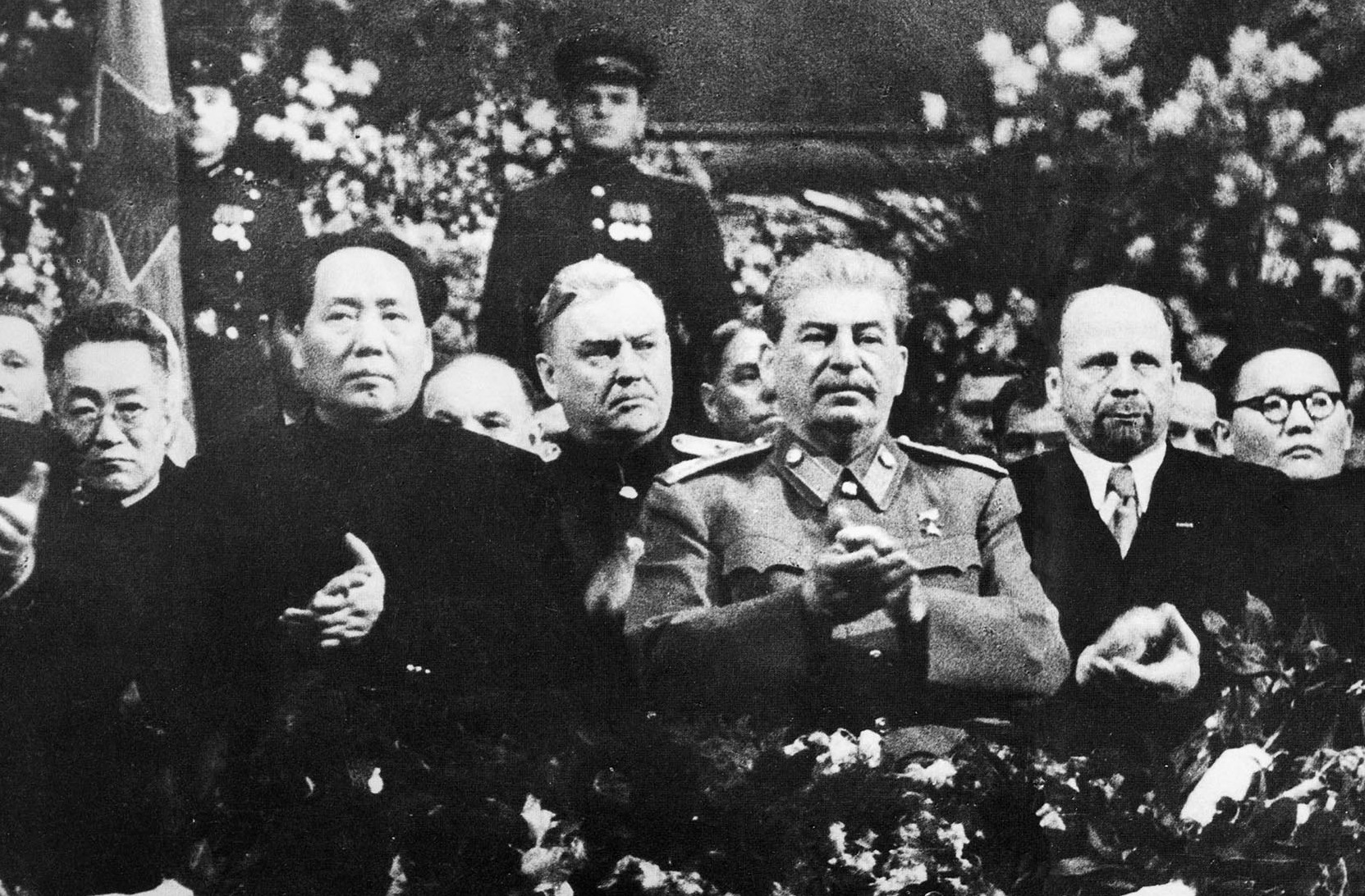
Joseph Stalin (third from right) presiding over a ceremony commemorating his 71st birthday a few years before his death.

From mid-December 1949, Khrushchev served as head of the Party in Moscow city and province. His biographer Taubman suggests that Stalin most likely recalled Khrushchev to Moscow to balance the influence of Georgy Malenkov and security chief Lavrentiy Beria, who were widely seen as Stalin's heirs. The aging leader rarely called Politburo meetings. Instead, much of the high-level work of government took place at dinners hosted by Stalin for his inner circle of Beria, Malenkov, Khrushchev, Kaganovich, Kliment Voroshilov, Vyacheslav Molotov, and Nikolai Bulganin. Khrushchev took early naps so that he would not fall asleep in Stalin's presence; he noted in his memoirs, "Things went badly for those who dozed off at Stalin's table."

In 1950, Khrushchev began a large-scale housing program for Moscow. Five- or six-story apartment buildings became ubiquitous throughout the Soviet Union. Khrushchev had prefabricated reinforced concrete used, greatly speeding up construction. These structures were completed at triple the construction rate of Moscow housing from 1946 to 1950, lacked elevators or balconies, and were nicknamed khrushchyovka by the public, but because of their shoddy workmanship sometimes disparagingly called Khrushchoba, combining Khrushchev's name with the Russian word trushchoba, meaning "slum". In 1995, almost 60,000,000 residents of the former Soviet Union still lived in these buildings.

In his new positions, Khrushchev continued his kolkhoz consolidation scheme, which decreased the number of collective farms in Moscow Oblast by about 70%. This resulted in farms that were too large for one chairman to manage effectively. Khrushchev also sought to implement his agro-town proposal, but when his lengthy speech on the subject was published in Pravda in March 1951, Stalin disapproved of it. The periodical quickly published a note stating that Khrushchev's speech was merely a proposal, not policy. In April, the Politburo disavowed the agro-town proposal. Khrushchev feared that Stalin would remove him from office, but the leader mocked Khrushchev, then allowed the episode to pass.

On 1 March 1953, Stalin had a massive stroke. As terrified doctors attempted treatment, Khrushchev and his colleagues engaged in an intense discussion as to the new government. On 5 March, Stalin died.

Khrushchev later reflected on Stalin:

Stalin called everyone who didn't agree with him an "enemy of the people." He said that they wanted to restore the old order, and for this purpose, "the enemies of the people" had linked up with the forces of reaction internationally. As a result, several hundred thousand honest people perished. Everyone lived in fear in those days. Everyone expected that at any moment there would be a knock on the door in the middle of the night and that knock on the door would prove fatal ... [P]eople not to Stalin's liking were annihilated, honest party members, irreproachable people, loyal and hard workers for our cause who had gone through the school of revolutionary struggle under Lenin's leadership. This was utter and complete arbitrariness. And now is all this to be forgiven and forgotten? Never!

=== Struggle for power ===
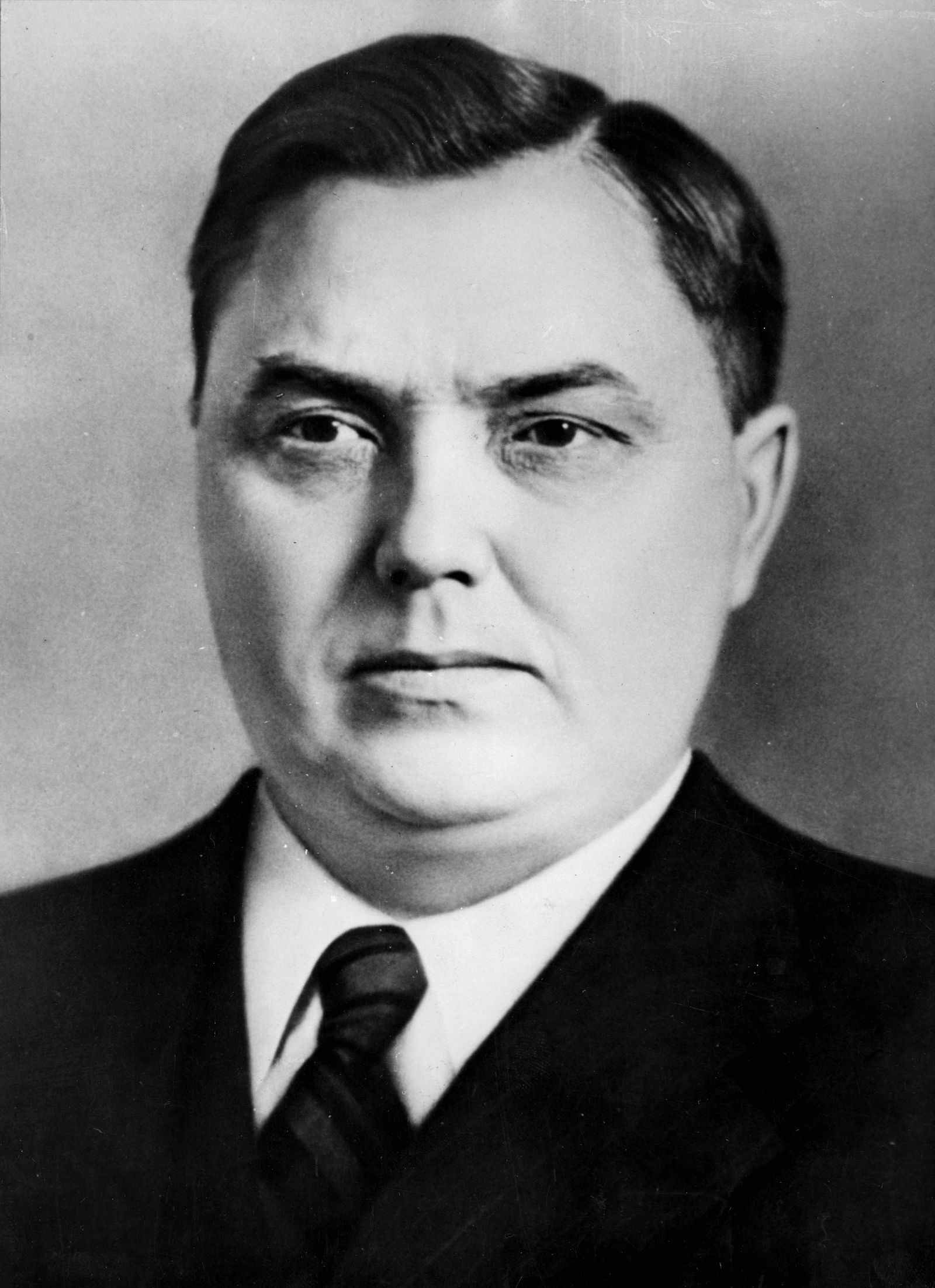
Georgy Malenkov, the Second Secretary who succeeded Stalin as leader of the Soviet Union.

On 6 March 1953, Stalin's death was announced, as was the new leadership. Malenkov was the new Chairman of the Council of Ministers, with Beria (who consolidated his hold over the security agencies), Kaganovich, Bulganin, and former Foreign Minister Vyacheslav Molotov as first vice-chairmen. Those members of the Presidium of the Central Committee who had been recently promoted by Stalin were demoted. Khrushchev was relieved of his duties as Party head for Moscow to concentrate on unspecified duties in the Party's Central Committee. The New York Times listed Malenkov and Beria first and second among the ten-man Presidium – and Khrushchev last.

However, Malenkov resigned from the secretariat of the Central Committee on 14 March. This was due to concerns that he was acquiring too much power. The major beneficiary was Khrushchev. His name appeared atop a revised list of secretaries –the indication that he was now in charge of the party. The Central Committee formally elected him First Secretary in September.

After Stalin's death, Beria launched a number of reforms. According to Taubman, "unparalleled in his cynicism, he [Beria] did not let ideology stand in his way. Had he prevailed, he would almost certainly have exterminated his colleagues, if only to prevent them from liquidating him. In the meantime, however, his burst of reforms rivaled Khrushchev's and in some ways even Gorbachev's". One proposal, which was adopted, was an amnesty which eventually led to the freeing of over a million non-political prisoners. Another, which was not adopted, was to release East Germany into a united, neutral Germany in exchange for compensation from the West –a proposal considered by Khrushchev to be anti-communist. Khrushchev allied with Malenkov to block many of Beria's proposals, while the two slowly picked up support from other Presidium members. Their campaign against Beria was aided by fears that Beria was planning a military coup, and, according to Khrushchev in his memoirs, by the conviction that "Beria is getting his knives ready for us." The key move by Khrushchev and Malenkov was to lure two of Beria's most powerful deputy ministers, Sergei Kruglov and Ivan Serov, to betray their boss. This allowed Khrushchev and Malenkov to arrest Beria as Beria belatedly discovered he had lost control of Ministry of Interior troops and the troops of the Kremlin guard. On 26 June 1953, Beria was arrested at a Presidium meeting, following extensive military preparations by Khrushchev and his allies. Beria was tried in secret and executed in December 1953 with five of his close associates.

The power struggle continued. Malenkov's power was in the central state apparatus, which he sought to extend through reorganizing the government, giving it additional power at the expense of the Party. He also sought public support by lowering retail prices and the level of bond sales to citizens, which had long been effectively obligatory. Khrushchev, with his power base in the Party, sought to strengthen the Party and his position within it. While, under the Soviet system, the Party was to be preeminent, it had been greatly drained of power by Stalin, who had given much of that power to himself and to the Politburo (later, to the Presidium). Khrushchev saw that with the Presidium in conflict, the Party and its Central Committee might again become powerful. Khrushchev carefully cultivated high Party officials and was able to appoint supporters as local Party bosses, who then took seats on the Central Committee.

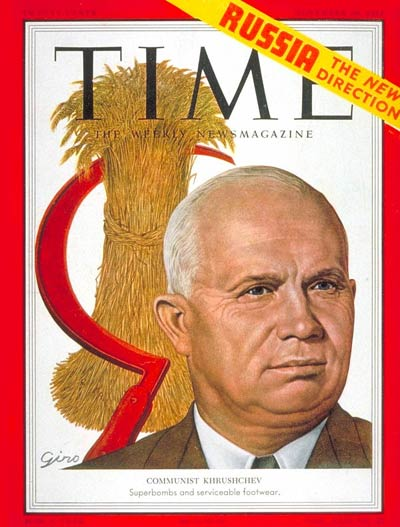
Khrushchev featured on the November 1953 cover of TIME after becoming First Secretary of the Communist Party

Khrushchev presented himself as a down-to-earth activist prepared to take up any challenge, contrasting with Malenkov who, though sophisticated, came across as colourless. Khrushchev arranged for the Kremlin grounds to be opened to the public, an act with "great public resonance". While both Malenkov and Khrushchev sought reforms to agriculture, Khrushchev's proposals were broader and included the Virgin Lands Campaign, under which hundreds of thousands of young volunteers would settle and farm areas of Western Siberia and Northern Kazakhstan. While the scheme was initially successful, it eventually became a disaster for Soviet agriculture. In addition, Khrushchev possessed incriminating information on Malenkov, taken from Beria's secret files. As Soviet prosecutors investigated the atrocities of Stalin's last years, including the Leningrad case, they came across evidence of Malenkov's involvement. Beginning in February 1954, Khrushchev replaced Malenkov in the seat of honour at Presidium meetings; in June, Malenkov ceased to head the list of Presidium members, which was thereafter organized in alphabetical order. Khrushchev's influence continued to increase, winning the allegiance of local party heads, and with his nominee heading the KGB.

In 1954, the Soviet leadership with Khrushchev transferred Crimea from the Russian SFSR to the Ukrainian SSR, a decision often attributed to Khrushchev's origin. Other historians, though, point more to the pacification of inner-soviet tensions and to a move in the power game with Malenkov.

At a Central Committee meeting in January 1955, Malenkov was accused of involvement in atrocities, and the committee passed a resolution accusing him of involvement in the Leningrad case, and of facilitating Beria's climb to power. At a meeting of the mostly ceremonial Supreme Soviet the following month, Malenkov was demoted in favor of Bulganin, to the surprise of Western observers. Malenkov remained in the Presidium as Minister of Electric Power Stations. According to Khrushchev biographer William Tompson, "Khrushchev's position as first among the members of the collective leadership was now beyond any reasonable doubt."

After the demotion of Malenkov, Khrushchev and Molotov initially worked together well. Molotov even proposed that Khrushchev, not Bulganin, replace Malenkov as premier. However, Khrushchev and Molotov increasingly differed on policy. Molotov opposed the Virgin Lands policy, instead proposing heavy investment to increase yields in developed agricultural areas, which Khrushchev felt was not feasible due to a lack of resources and a lack of a sophisticated farm labor force. The two differed on foreign policy as well; soon after Khrushchev took power, he sought a peace treaty with Austria, which would allow Soviet troops then occupying part of the country to leave. Molotov was resistant, but Khrushchev arranged for an Austrian delegation to come to Moscow and negotiate the treaty. Although Khrushchev and other Presidium members attacked Molotov at a Central Committee meeting in mid-1955, accusing him of conducting a foreign policy which turned the world against the USSR, Molotov remained in his position.

The post-Stalin battle for political control reshaped foreign policy. There was more realism and less ideological abstraction when confronted by European and Middle Eastern situations. Khrushchev's "secret speech" attack on Stalin in 1956 was a signal for abandoning Stalinist precepts and looking at new options, including more involvement in the Middle East. Khrushchev in power did not moderate his personality—he remained unpredictable and was emboldened by the spectacular successes in space. He thought that would give the USSR world prestige, leading to quick Communist advances in the Third World. Khrushchev's policy was still restrained by the need to retain the support of the Presidium and to placate the inarticulate but restive Soviet masses who were thrilled by Sputnik but demanded a higher standard of living on the ground as well.

== Leader of the Soviet Union (1955–1964) ==
=== Domestic policies ===
==== "Secret Speech" and de-Stalinization ====
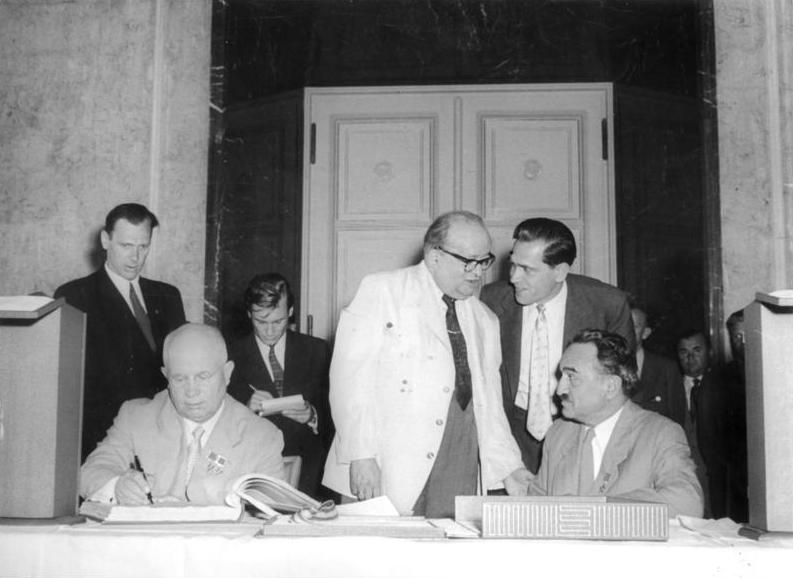
Nikita Khrushchev with Anastas Mikoyan (far right) in Berlin

By the end of 1955, thousands of political prisoners had been rehabilitated and allowed to return home. Accounts of the GULAG from survivors like Alexei Snegov and Olga Shatunovskaya brought home the full breadth of Stalin's crimes to his successors. Working together with his close ally Anastas Mikoyan, Khrushchev became convinced that once the stain of Stalinism was removed, the Party would inspire loyalty among the people. Snegov personally urged Khrushchev to denounce Stalin at the upcoming 20th Party Congress. Beginning in October 1955, Khrushchev fought to tell the delegates of the Congress about Stalin's crimes. Some of his colleagues, including Molotov and Malenkov, opposed the disclosure and persuaded him to make his remarks in a closed session.

The 20th Party Congress opened on 14 February 1956. In his opening words in his initial address, Khrushchev denigrated Stalin by asking delegates to rise in honour of the Communist leaders who had died since the last congress, whom he named, equating Stalin with Klement Gottwald and the little-known Kyuichi Tokuda. In the early morning of 25 February, Khrushchev delivered what became known as the "Secret Speech" to a closed session of the Congress limited to Soviet delegates. In four hours, he demolished Stalin's reputation. Khrushchev noted in his memoirs that the "congress listened to me in silence. As the saying goes, you could have heard a pin drop. It was all so sudden and unexpected." Khrushchev told the delegates:

It is here that Stalin showed in a whole series of cases his intolerance, his brutality, and his abuse of power ... he often chose the path of repression and physical annihilation, not only against actual enemies but also against individuals who had not committed any crimes against the party or the Soviet Government.

The Secret Speech did not fundamentally change Soviet society but had wide-ranging effects. The speech was a factor in unrest in Poland and revolution in Hungary later in 1956, and Stalin defenders led four days of rioting in his native Georgia in June, calling for Khrushchev to resign and Molotov to take over. In meetings where the Secret Speech was read, communists would make even more severe condemnations of Stalin (and of Khrushchev), and even call for multi-party elections. However, Stalin was not publicly denounced, and his portrait remained widespread through the USSR, from airports to Khrushchev's Kremlin office. Mikhail Gorbachev, then a Komsomol official, recalled that though young and well-educated Soviets in his district were excited by the speech, many others decried it, either defending Stalin or seeing little point in digging up the past. Forty years later, after the fall of the Soviet Union, Gorbachev applauded Khrushchev for his courage in taking a huge political risk and showing himself to be "a moral man after all".

The term "Secret Speech" proved to be an utter misnomer. While the attendees at the Speech were all Soviet, Eastern European delegates were allowed to hear it the following night, read slowly to allow them to take notes. By 5 March, copies were being mailed throughout the Soviet Union, marked "not for the press" rather than "top secret". An official translation appeared within a month in Poland; the Poles printed 12,000 extra copies, one of which soon reached the West. Khrushchev's son, Sergei, later wrote:

clearly, Father tried to ensure it would reach as many ears as possible. It was soon read at Komsomol meetings; that meant another eighteen million listeners. If you include their relatives, friends, and acquaintances, you could say that the entire country became familiar with the speech ... Spring had barely begun when the speech began circulating around the world.

The anti-Khrushchev minority in the Presidium was augmented by those opposed to Khrushchev's proposals to decentralize authority over industry, which struck at the heart of Malenkov's power base. During the first half of 1957, Malenkov, Molotov, and Kaganovich worked to quietly build support to dismiss Khrushchev. At an 18 June Presidium meeting at which two Khrushchev supporters were absent, the plotters moved that Bulganin, who had joined the scheme, take the chair, and proposed other moves which would effectively demote Khrushchev and put themselves in control. Khrushchev objected on the grounds that not all Presidium members had been notified, an objection which would have been quickly dismissed had Khrushchev not held firm control over the military, through Minister of Defense Marshal Zhukov, and the security departments. Lengthy Presidium meetings took place, continuing over several days. As word leaked of the power struggle, members of the Central Committee, which Khrushchev controlled, streamed to Moscow, many flown there aboard military planes, and demanded to be admitted to the meeting. While they were not admitted, there were soon enough Central Committee members in Moscow to call an emergency Party Congress, which effectively forced the leadership to allow a session of the Central Committee. At that meeting, the three main conspirators were dubbed the Anti-Party Group, and denounced with accusations of factionalism and complicity in Stalin's crimes. The three were expelled from the Central Committee and Presidium, as was former Foreign Minister and Khrushchev client Dmitri Shepilov who joined them in the plot. Molotov was sent as Ambassador to Mongolia; the others were sent to head industrial facilities and institutes far from Moscow.

Marshal Zhukov was rewarded for his support with full membership in the Presidium, but Khrushchev feared his popularity and power. In October 1957, the defense minister was sent on a tour of the Balkans, as Khrushchev arranged a Presidium meeting to dismiss him. Zhukov learned what was happening, and hurried back to Moscow, only to be formally notified of his dismissal. At a Central Committee meeting several weeks later, not a word was said in Zhukov's defense. Khrushchev completed the consolidation of power in March 1958, arranging for Bulganin's dismissal as premier in favor of himself (Bulganin was appointed to head the Gosbank) and by establishing a USSR Defense Council, led by himself, effectively making him commander in chief. Though Khrushchev was now preeminent, he did not enjoy Stalin's absolute power.

==== Liberalization and the arts ====
After assuming power, Khrushchev allowed a modest amount of freedom in the arts. Vladimir Dudintsev's novel Not by Bread Alone, about an idealistic engineer opposed by rigid bureaucrats, was allowed to be published in 1956, though Khrushchev called the novel "false at its base". In 1958, however, Khrushchev ordered a fierce attack on Boris Pasternak after his novel Doctor Zhivago was published abroad (he was denied permission to publish it in the Soviet Union). Pravda described the novel as "low-grade reactionary hackwork", and the author was expelled from the Writer's Union. Pasternak was awarded the Nobel Prize for Literature, but under heavy pressure he declined it. Once he did so, Khrushchev ordered a halt to the attacks on Pasternak. In his memoirs, Khrushchev stated that he agonized over the novel, very nearly allowed it to be published, and later regretted not doing so. After his fall from power, Khrushchev read the novel (he had earlier read only excerpts) and stated, "We shouldn't have banned it. I should have read it myself. There's nothing anti-Soviet in it."

Khrushchev believed that the USSR could match the West's living standards, and was not afraid to allow Soviet citizens to see Western achievements. Stalin had permitted few tourists to the Soviet Union, and had allowed few Soviets to travel. Khrushchev let Soviets travel (over two million Soviet citizens travelled abroad between 1957 and 1961, 700,000 of whom visited the West) and allowed foreigners to visit the Soviet Union, where tourists became subjects of immense curiosity. In 1957, Khrushchev authorized the 6th World Festival of Youth and Students to be held in Moscow that summer. He instructed Komsomol officials to "smother foreign guests in our embrace". The resulting "socialist carnival" involved over three million Moscovites, who joined with 30,000 young foreign visitors in events that ranged from discussion groups throughout the city to events at the Kremlin itself. According to historian Vladislav Zubok, the festival "shattered propagandist clichés" about Westerners by allowing Moscovites to see them for themselves.

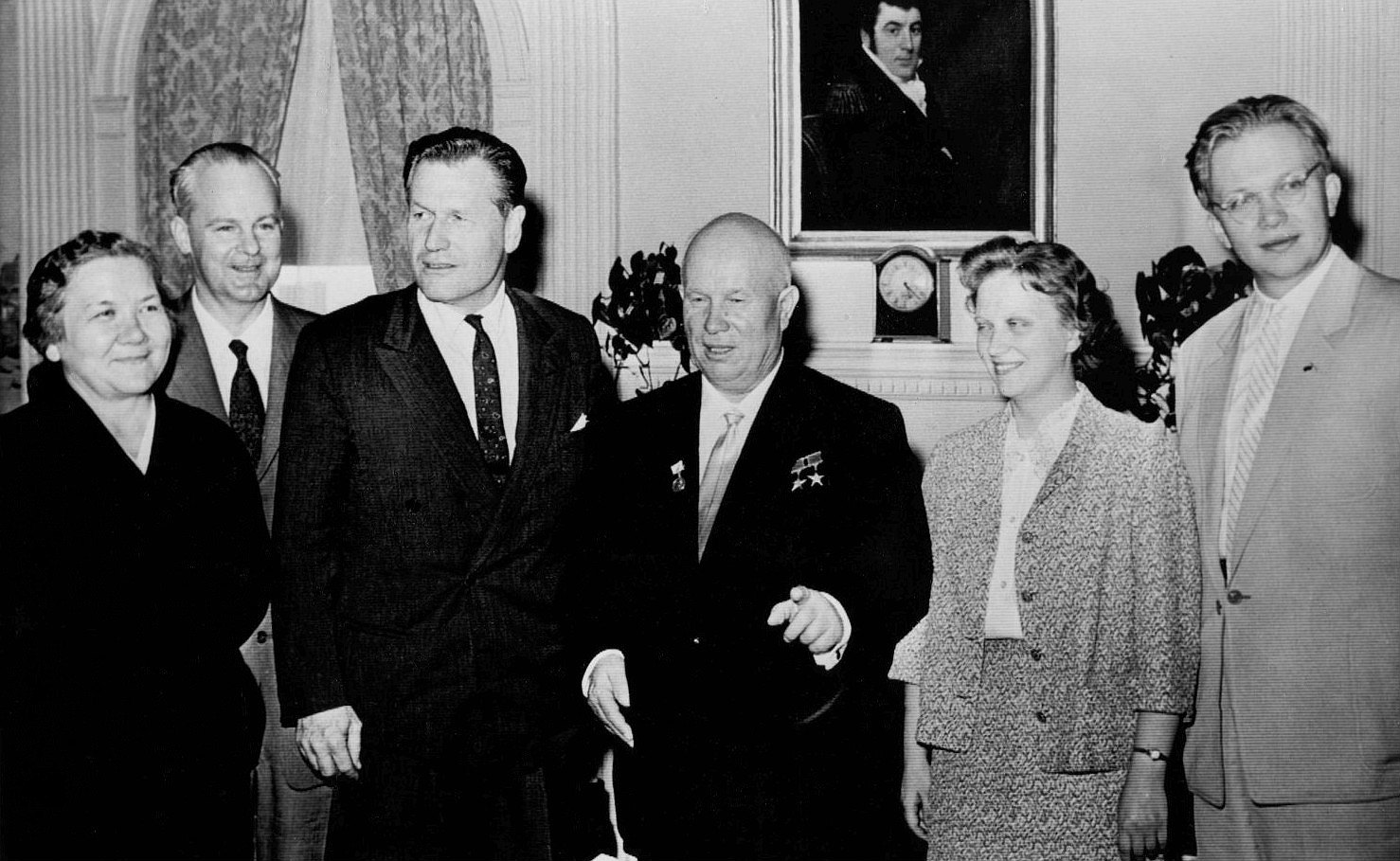
Khrushchev, his wife, his son Sergei (far right) and his daughter Rada during their trip to the US in 1959

In 1962, Khrushchev, impressed by Aleksandr Solzhenitsyn's One Day in the Life of Ivan Denisovich, persuaded the Presidium to allow publication. That renewed thaw ended on 1 December 1962, when Khrushchev was taken to the Manezh Gallery to view an exhibit which included a number of avant-garde works. On seeing them, Khrushchev exploded with anger, an episode known as the Manege Affair, describing the artwork as "dog shit", and proclaiming that "a donkey could smear better art with its tail". A week later, Pravda issued a call for artistic purity. When writers and filmmakers defended the painters, Khrushchev extended his anger to them. However, despite the premier's rage, none of the artists were arrested or exiled. The Manezh Gallery exhibit remained open and experienced a considerable rise in attendance after the article in Pravda.

==== Political reform ====
Under Khrushchev, the special tribunals operated by security agencies were abolished. These tribunals, known as troikas, had often ignored laws and procedures. Under the reforms, no prosecution for a political crime could be brought even in the regular courts unless approved by the local Party committee. This rarely happened; there were no major political trials under Khrushchev, and at most several hundred political prosecutions overall. Instead, other sanctions were imposed on Soviet dissidents, including loss of job or university position, or expulsion from the Party. During Khrushchev's rule, forced hospitalization for the "socially dangerous" was introduced. According to author Roy Medvedev, who wrote an early analysis of Khrushchev's years in power, "political terror as an everyday method of government was replaced under Khrushchev by administrative means of repression".

In 1958, Khrushchev opened a Central Committee meeting to hundreds of Soviet officials; some were even allowed to address the meeting. For the first time, the proceedings of the committee were made public in book form, a practice which was continued at subsequent meetings. This openness, however, actually allowed Khrushchev greater control over the committee, since dissenters would have to make their case in front of a large, disapproving crowd.

In 1962, Khrushchev divided oblast level Party committees (obkoms) into two parallel structures, one for industry and one for agriculture. This was unpopular among Party apparatchiks, and led to confusions in the chain of command, as neither committee secretary had precedence over the other. As there were limited numbers of Central Committee seats from each oblast, the division set up the possibility of rivalry for office between factions, and, according to Medvedev, had the potential for beginning a two-party system. Khrushchev also ordered that one-third of the membership of each committee, from low-level councils to the Central Committee itself, be replaced at each election. This decree created tension between Khrushchev and the Central Committee, and upset the party leaders upon whose support Khrushchev had risen to power.

==== Agricultural policy ====
Khrushchev was an expert on agricultural policies and sensed an urgent need to reform the backward, inefficient system with ideas that worked in the US. He looked especially at collectivism, state farms, liquidation of machine-tractor stations, planning decentralization, economic incentives, increased labor and capital investment, new crops, and new production programs. Henry Ford had been at the center of American technology transfer to the Soviet Union in the 1930s; he sent over factory designs, engineers, and skilled craftsmen, as well as tens of thousands of Ford tractors. By the 1940s Khrushchev was keenly interested in American agricultural innovations, especially on large-scale family-operated farms in the Midwest. In the 1950s he sent several delegations to visit farms and land grant colleges, looking at successful farms that utilized high-yielding seed varieties, very large and powerful tractors and other machines, all guided by modern management techniques. Especially after his visit to the US in 1959, he was keenly aware of the need to emulate and even match American superiority and agricultural technology.

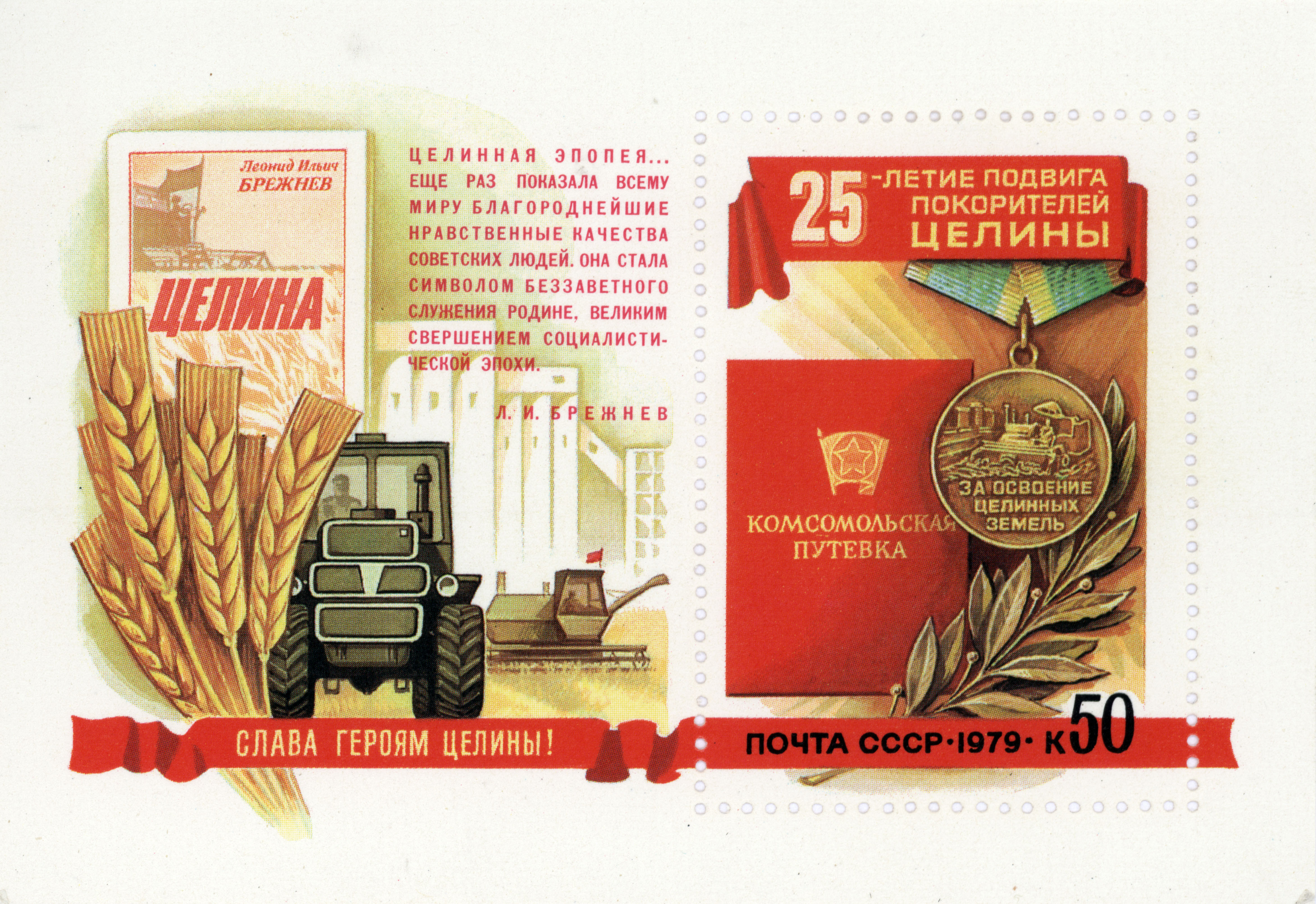
A postage stamp from 1979 commemorating the 25th anniversary of the Virgin Lands campaign

Khrushchev became a hyper-enthusiastic crusader to grow corn (maize). He established a corn institute in Ukraine and ordered thousands of hectares to be planted in the Virgin Lands. In 1955, Khrushchev advocated an Iowa-style corn belt in the Soviet Union, and a Soviet delegation visited the U.S. state that summer. The delegation chief was approached by farmer and corn seed salesman Roswell Garst, who persuaded him to visit Garst's large farm. The Iowan visited the Soviet Union, where he became friends with Khrushchev, and Garst sold the USSR 4,500 metric tons (5,000 short tons) of seed corn. Garst warned the Soviets to grow the corn in the southern part of the country and to ensure there were sufficient stocks of fertilizer, insecticides, and herbicides. This, however, was not done, as Khrushchev sought to plant corn even in Siberia, and without the necessary chemicals. The corn experiment was not a great success, and he later complained that overenthusiastic officials had overplanted without laying the proper groundwork, and "as a result corn was discredited as a silage crop—and so was I".

Khrushchev sought to abolish the Machine-Tractor Stations (MTS) which not only owned most large agricultural machines but also provided services such as plowing, and transfer their equipment and functions to the kolkhozes and sovkhozes (state farms). After a successful test involving MTS which served one large kolkhoz each, Khrushchev ordered a gradual transition—but then ordered that the change take place with great speed. Within three months, over half of the MTS facilities had been closed, and kolkhozes were being required to buy the equipment, with no discount given for older or dilapidated machines. MTS employees, unwilling to bind themselves to kolkhozes and lose their state employee benefits and the right to change their jobs, fled to the cities, creating a shortage of skilled operators. The costs of the machinery, plus the costs of building storage sheds and fuel tanks for the equipment, impoverished many kolkhozes. Inadequate provisions were made for repair stations. Without the MTS, the market for Soviet agricultural equipment fell apart, as the kolkhozes now had neither the money nor skilled buyers to purchase new equipment.

In the 1940s, Stalin put Trofim Lysenko in charge of agricultural research, with his ideas that flouted modern genetics science. Lysenko maintained his influence under Khrushchev, and helped block the adoption of American techniques. In 1959, Khrushchev announced a goal of overtaking the US in the production of milk, meat, and butter. Local officials kept Khrushchev happy with unrealistic pledges of production. These goals were met by farmers who slaughtered their breeding herds and by purchasing meat at state stores, then reselling it back to the government, artificially increasing recorded production.

In June 1962, food prices were raised, particularly on meat and butter, by 25–30%. This caused public discontent. In the southern Russian city of Novocherkassk, this discontent escalated to a strike and a revolt against the authorities. The revolt was put down by the military, resulting in a massacre that killed 22 people and wounded 87 according to Soviet official accounts. In addition, 116 demonstrators were convicted of involvement and seven were executed. Information about the revolt was completely suppressed in the USSR, but spread through Samizdat and damaged Khrushchev's reputation in the West.

Drought struck the Soviet Union in 1963; the harvest of 97,500,000 t (107,500,000 short tons) of grain was down from a peak of 122,200,000 t (134,700,000 short tons) in 1958. The shortages resulted in bread lines, a fact at first kept from Khrushchev. Reluctant to purchase food in the West, but faced with the alternative of widespread hunger, Khrushchev exhausted the nation's hard currency reserves and expended part of its gold stockpile in the purchase of grain and other foodstuffs.

==== Education ====
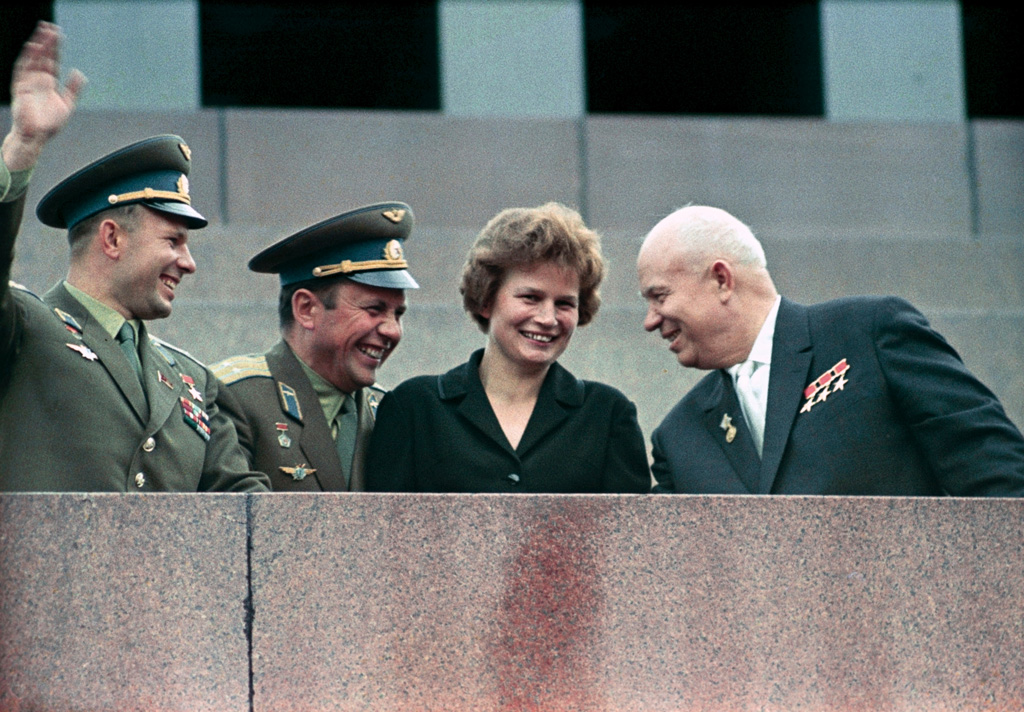
Khrushchev (right) with cosmonauts Yuri Gagarin, Pavel Popovich and Valentina Tereshkova, 1963

While visiting the United States in 1959, Khrushchev was impressed by the agricultural education program at Iowa State University, and sought to imitate it in the Soviet Union. At the time, the main agricultural college in the USSR was in Moscow, and students did not do the manual labor of farming. Khrushchev proposed moving the programs to rural areas. He was unsuccessful, due to resistance from professors and students, who never actually disagreed with the premier, but who did not carry out his proposals. Khrushchev recalled in his memoirs:

It's nice to live in Moscow and work at the Timiryazev Agricultural Academy. It's a venerable old institution, a large economic unit, with skilled instructors, but it's in the city! Its students aren't yearning to work on the collective farms because to do that they'd have to go out in the provinces and live in the sticks.

Khrushchev founded several academic towns, such as Akademgorodok. The premier believed that Western science flourished because many scientists lived in university towns such as Oxford, isolated from big-city distractions, and had pleasant living conditions and good pay. He sought to duplicate those conditions. Khrushchev's attempt was generally successful, though his new towns and scientific centres tended to attract younger scientists, with older ones unwilling to leave Moscow or Leningrad.

Khrushchev also proposed to restructure Soviet high schools. While the high schools provided a college preparatory curriculum, few Soviet youths went on to university. Khrushchev wanted to shift the focus of secondary schools to vocational training. In practice, schools developed links with nearby enterprises and students went to work for only one or two days a week; the organizations disliked having to teach, while students and their families complained that they had little choice in what trade to learn.

While the vocational proposal would not survive Khrushchev's downfall, a longer-lasting change was a related establishment of specialized high schools. These schools were modeled after the foreign-language schools that had been established in Moscow and Leningrad beginning in 1949. In 1962, a special summer school was established in Novosibirsk to prepare students for the Siberian math and science Olympiad. The following year, the Novosibirsk Maths and Science Boarding-School became the first permanent residential school specializing in math and science. Other such schools were soon established in Moscow, Leningrad, and Kiev. By the early 1970s, over 100 specialized schools had been established in mathematics, the sciences, art, music, and sport. Preschool education was increased as part of Khrushchev's reforms, and by the time he left office, about 22% of Soviet children attended preschool—about half of urban children, but only about 12% of rural children.

==== Anti-religious campaign ====
The anti-religious campaign of the Khrushchev era began in 1959, coinciding with the 21st Party Congress. It was carried out by mass closures of churches (reducing the number from 22,000 in 1959 to 13,008 in 1960 and to 7,873 by 1965), monasteries, convents, and seminaries. The campaign also included a restriction on parental rights to teach religion to their children; a ban on the presence of children at church services; and a ban on the administration of the Eucharist to children over the age of four. Khrushchev additionally banned all services held outside of churches' walls, renewed enforcement of 1929 legislation banning pilgrimages, and recorded the personal identities of all adults requesting church baptisms, weddings, or funerals. He disallowed the ringing of church bells and services in daytime in some rural settings from May to the end of October under the pretext of fieldwork requirements. Non-fulfillment of these regulations by clergy would lead to disallowance of state registration (meaning clergy could no longer do any pastoral or liturgical work without special state permission). According to Dimitry Pospielovsky, the state carried out forced retirement, arrests, and prison sentences for clergymen on "trumped-up charges," but in reality, he writes, said state actions were taken against clergy who resisted the closure of churches; delivered sermons attacking the USSR's state atheism and anti-religious campaign; conducted Christian charity; or made religion popular by personal example.

=== Foreign and defense policies ===
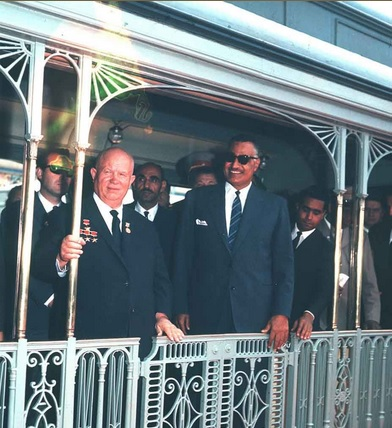
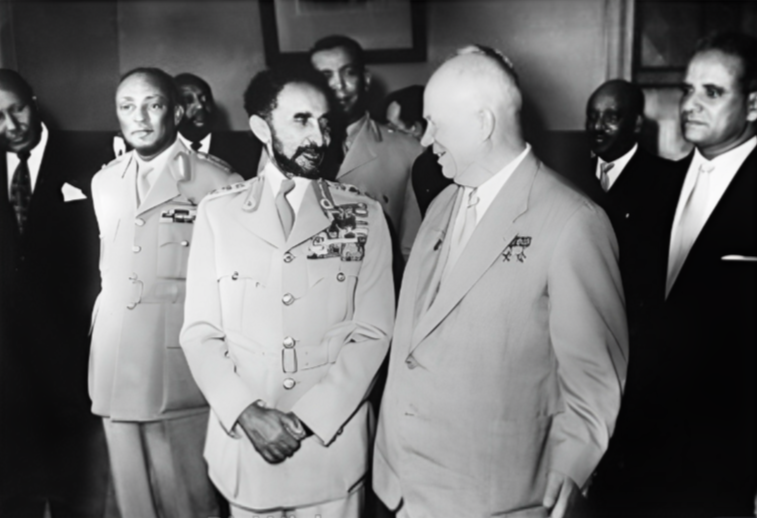
Khrushchev and Egyptian President Gamal Abdel Nasser aboard a train returning to Cairo from Alexandria, during a visit by Khrushchev to Egypt, 1964. And Ethiopian Emperor Haile Selassie I during his state visit to Moscow, 1959

When Khrushchev took control, the outside world still knew little of him, and initially was not impressed by him. Short, heavyset, and wearing ill-fitting suits, he "radiated energy but not intellect", and was dismissed by many as a buffoon who would not last long. British Foreign Secretary Harold Macmillan wondered, "How can this fat, vulgar man with his pig eyes and ceaseless flow of talk be the head—the aspirant Tsar for all those millions of people?"

Khrushchev biographer Tompson stated:

He could be charming or vulgar, ebullient or sullen, he was given to public displays of rage (often contrived) and to soaring hyperbole in his rhetoric. But whatever he was, however, he came across, he was more human than his predecessor or even than most of his foreign counterparts, and for much of the world that was enough to make the USSR seem less mysterious or menacing.

==== United States and NATO ====
===== Early relations and U.S. visit (1957–1960) =====
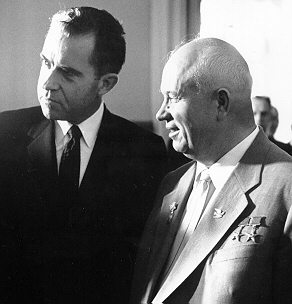
Khrushchev with Vice President Richard Nixon, 1959

Khrushchev sought to find a lasting solution to the problem of a divided Germany and of the enclave of West Berlin. In November 1958, calling West Berlin a "malignant tumor", he gave the United States, United Kingdom and France six months to conclude a peace treaty with both German states and the Soviet Union. If one was not signed, Khrushchev stated, the Soviet Union would conclude a peace treaty with East Germany. This would leave East Germany, which was not a party to treaties giving the Western Powers access to Berlin, in control of the routes to the city. They proposed making Berlin a free city, which meant no outside military forces would be stationed there. West Germany, United States and France strongly opposed the ultimatum, but Britain wanted to consider it as a starting point for negotiations. No one wanted to risk war over the issue. At Britain's request, Khrushchev extended and ultimately dropped the ultimatum, as the Berlin issue became part of the complex agenda of high-level summit meetings.

Khrushchev sought to sharply reduce levels of conventional weapons and to defend the Soviet Union with missiles. He believed that without this transition, the huge Soviet military would continue to eat up resources, making Khrushchev's goals of improving Soviet life difficult to achieve. He abandoned Stalin's plans for a large navy in 1955, believing that the new ships would be too vulnerable to either a conventional or nuclear attack. In January 1960, he took advantage of improved relations with the U.S. to order a reduction of one-third in the size of Soviet armed forces, alleging that advanced weapons would make up for the lost troops. While conscription of Soviet youth remained in force, exemptions from military service became more and more common, especially for students.

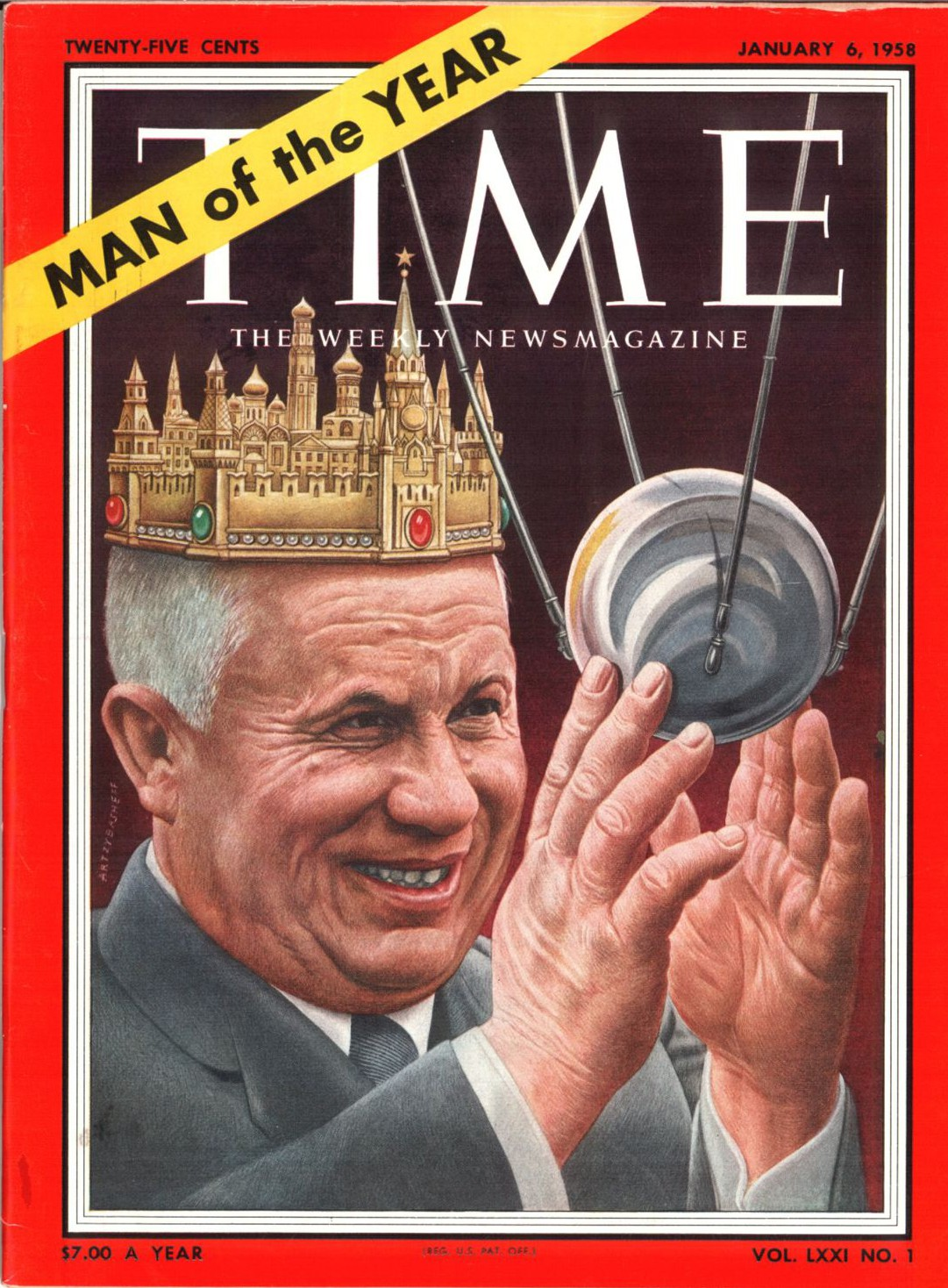
Khrushchev featured as Time Magazine's Man of the Year for 1957 after the launch of Sputnik

Historians Campbell Craig and Sergey Radchenko later argued that Khrushchev thought that policies like Mutually Assured Destruction (MAD) were too dangerous for the Soviet Union. His approach did not greatly change his foreign policy or military doctrine but is apparent in his determination to choose options that minimized the risk of war. The Soviets had few operable intercontinental ballistic missiles (ICBM), but Khrushchev publicly boasted of the Soviets' missile programs, stating that Soviet weapons were varied and numerous. The First Secretary hoped that public perception that the Soviets were ahead would put psychological pressure on the West resulting in political concessions. The Soviet space program, which Khrushchev firmly supported, appeared to confirm his claims when the Soviets launched Sputnik 1 into orbit, a feat that astonished the world. Western governments concluded that the Soviet ICBM program was further along than it actually was. Khrushchev added to this misapprehension by stating in an October 1957 interview that the USSR had all the rockets, of whatever capacity, that it needed.

For years, Khrushchev would make a point of preceding a major foreign trip with a rocket launch, to the discomfiture of his hosts. In January 1960 Khrushchev told the Presidium that Soviet ICBMs made an agreement with the U.S. possible because "main-street Americans have begun to shake from fear for the first times in their lives". The United States had learned of the underdeveloped state of the Soviet missile program from overflights in the late 1950s, but only high U.S. officials knew of the deception. The perception of a "missile gap" led to a considerable defense buildup on the part of the United States.

During Vice President Nixon's visit to the Soviet Union in 1959 he and Khrushchev took part in what later became known as the Kitchen Debate. Nixon and Khrushchev had an impassioned argument in a model kitchen at the American National Exhibition in Moscow, with each defending the economic system of his country.

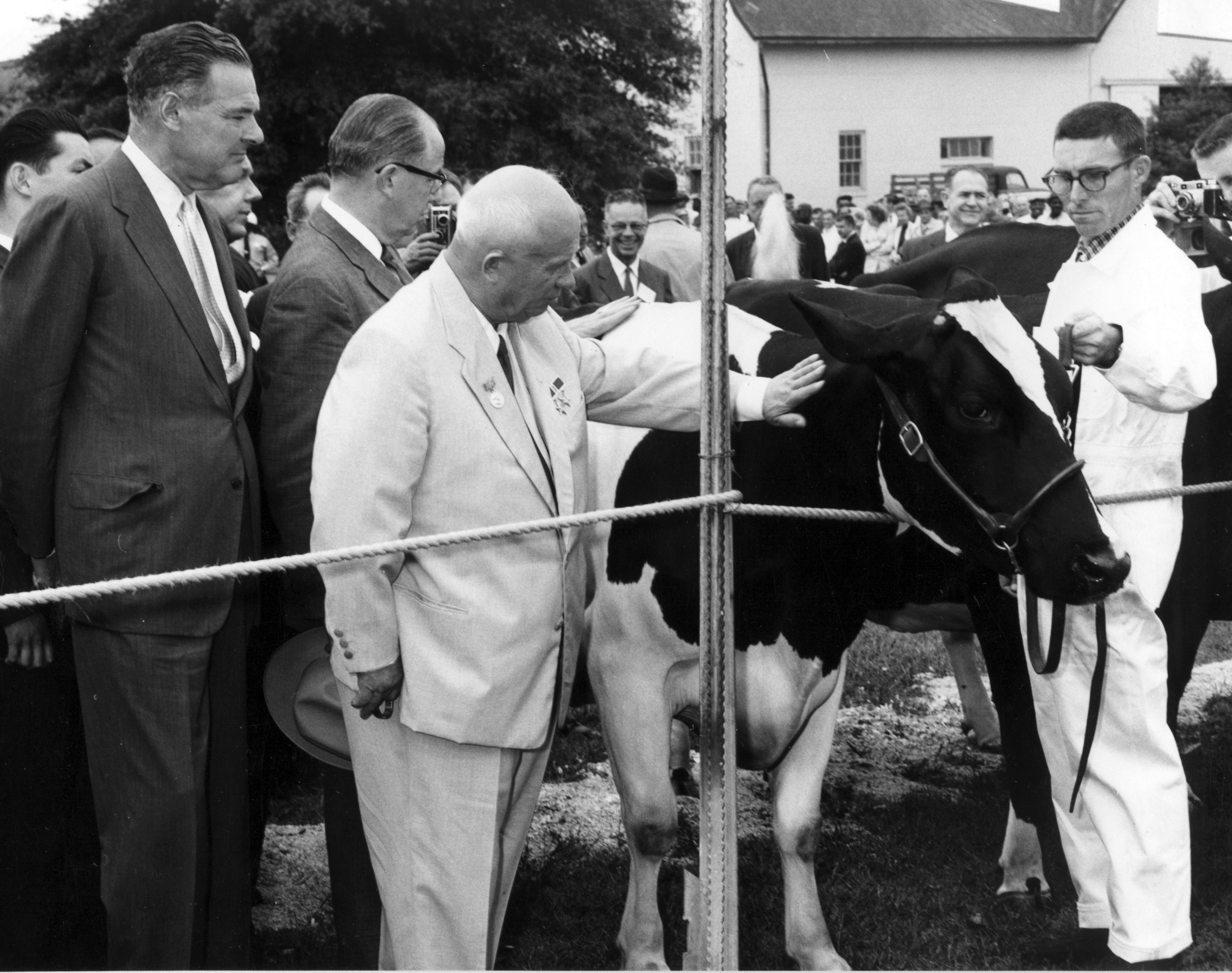
Khrushchev with Agriculture Secretary Ezra Taft Benson (left of Khrushchev) and U.S. Ambassador to the United Nations Henry Cabot Lodge (far left) during his visit on 16 September 1959 to the Agricultural Research Service Center

Nixon invited Khrushchev to visit the United States, and he agreed. He made his first visit to the United States, arriving in Washington, on 15 September 1959, spending thirteen days in the country. This first visit by a Soviet premier resulted in an extended media circus. Khrushchev brought his wife and adult children with him, though it was not usual for Soviet officials to travel with their families. He visited New York City, Los Angeles, San Francisco (visiting a supermarket), Coon Rapids, Iowa (visiting Roswell Garst's farm), Pittsburgh, and Washington, concluding with a meeting with President Eisenhower at Camp David. During luncheon at the Twentieth Century-Fox Studio in Los Angeles, Khrushchev engaged in an improvised yet jovial debate with his host Spyros Skouras over the merits of capitalism and communism. Khrushchev was also to visit Disneyland, but the visit was canceled for security reasons, much to his disgruntlement. He did, however, visit Eleanor Roosevelt at her home. While visiting IBM's new research campus in San Jose, California, Khrushchev expressed little interest in computer technology, but he greatly admired the self-service cafeteria, and, on his return, introduced self-service in the Soviet Union.

This visit resulted in an informal agreement that there would be no firm deadline over Berlin, but that there would be a four-power summit to try to resolve the issue. The Russian's goal was to present warmth, charm and peacefulness, using candid interviews to convince Americans of his humanity and good will. He performed well and Theodore Windt calls it "the zenith of his career." The friendly American audiences convinced Khrushchev that he had achieved a strong personal relationship with Eisenhower and that he could achieve détente with the Americans. Eisenhower was actually unimpressed by the Soviet leader. He pushed for an immediate summit but was frustrated by French President Charles de Gaulle, who postponed it until 1960, a year in which Eisenhower was scheduled to pay a return visit to the Soviet Union.

===== U-2 and Berlin crisis (1960–1961) =====
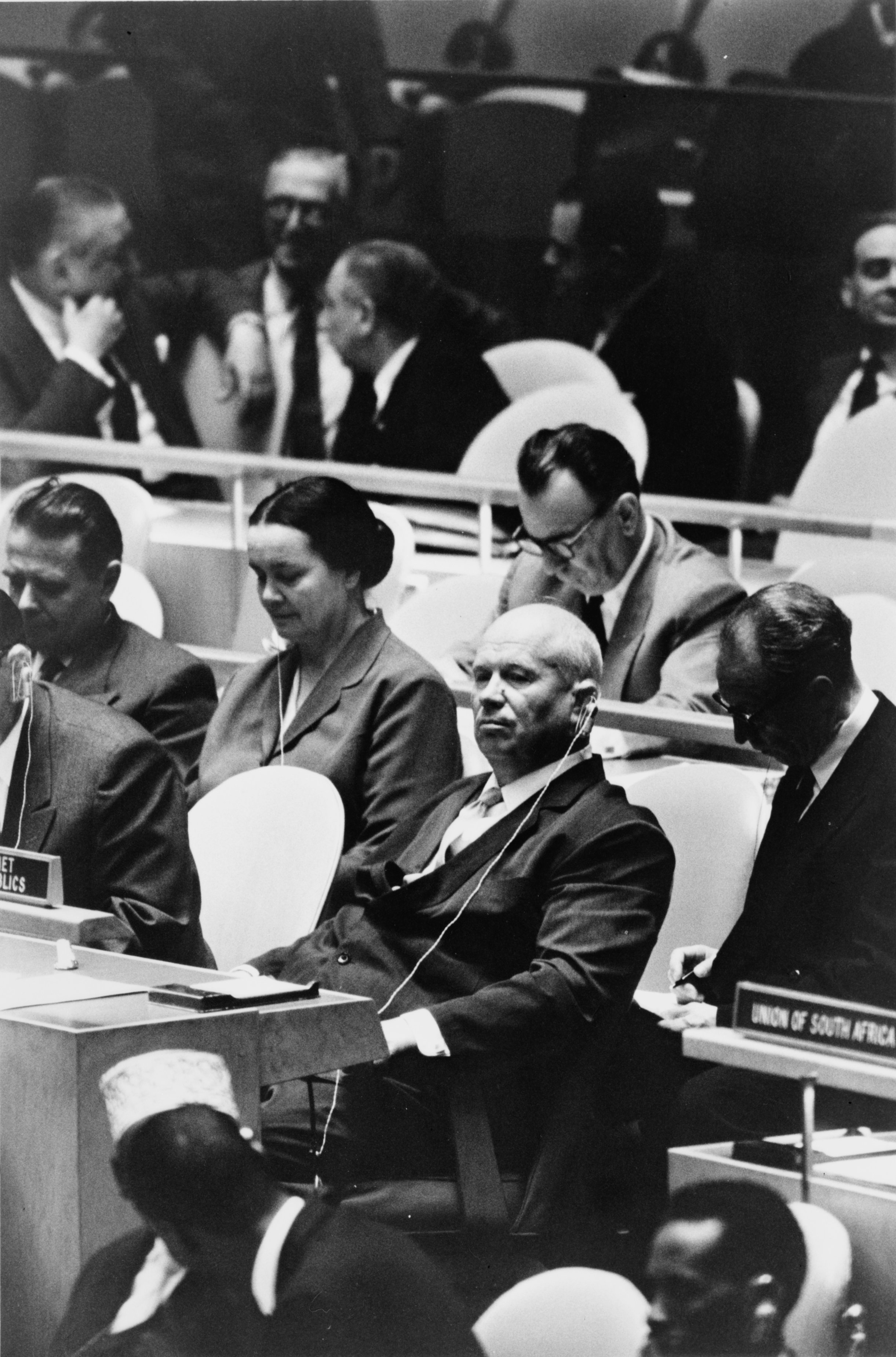
Khrushchev and head of USSR delegation Zoya Mironova at the United Nations, September 1960

A constant irritant in Soviet–US relations was the overflight of the Soviet Union by American U-2 spy aircraft. On April 9, 1960, the US resumed such flights after a lengthy break. The Soviets had protested the flights in the past, but had been ignored by Washington. Content in what he thought was a strong personal relationship with Eisenhower, Khrushchev was confused and angered by the flights' resumption, and concluded that they had been ordered by CIA Director Allen Dulles without the US President's knowledge. On May 1, a U-2 was shot down; its pilot, Francis Gary Powers captured alive. Believing Powers to have been killed, the US announced that a weather plane had been lost near the Turkish-Soviet border. Khrushchev risked destroying the summit, due to start on May 16 in Paris, if he announced the shootdown, but would look weak in the eyes of his military and security forces if he did nothing. Finally, on May 5, Khrushchev announced the shootdown and Powers's capture, blaming the overflight on "imperialist circles and militarists, whose stronghold is the Pentagon", and suggesting the plane had been sent without Eisenhower's knowledge. Eisenhower could not have it thought that there were rogue elements in the Pentagon operating without his knowledge, and admitted that he had ordered the flights, calling them "a distasteful necessity". The admission stunned Khrushchev, and turned the U-2 affair from a possible triumph to a disaster for him, and he even appealed to US Ambassador Llewellyn Thompson for help.

Khrushchev was undecided what to do at the summit even as he boarded his flight. He finally decided, in consultation with his advisers on the plane and Presidium members in Moscow, to demand an apology from Eisenhower and a promise that there would be no further U-2 flights in Soviet airspace. Neither Eisenhower nor Khrushchev communicated with the other in the days before the summit, and at the summit, Khrushchev made his demands and stated that there was no purpose in the summit, which should be postponed for six to eight months, until after the 1960 United States presidential election. The U.S. president offered no apology but stated that the flights had been suspended and would not resume and renewed his Open Skies proposal for mutual overflight rights. This was not enough for Khrushchev, who left the summit. Eisenhower accused Khrushchev "of sabotaging this meeting, on which so much of the hopes of the world have rested". Eisenhower's visit to the Soviet Union, for which the premier had even built a golf course so the U.S. president could enjoy his favorite sport, was cancelled by Khrushchev.

Khrushchev made his second and final visit to the US in September 1960. He had no invitation but had appointed himself as head of the USSR's UN delegation. He spent much of his time wooing the new Third World states which had recently become independent. The U.S. restricted him to the island of Manhattan, with visits to an estate owned by the USSR on Long Island. The notorious shoe-banging incident occurred during a debate on 12 October over a Soviet resolution decrying colonialism. Khrushchev was infuriated by a statement of the Filipino delegate Lorenzo Sumulong charging the Soviets with employing a double standard by decrying colonialism while dominating Eastern Europe. Khrushchev demanded the right to reply immediately and accused Sumulong of being "a fawning lackey of the American imperialists". Sumulong accused the Soviets of hypocrisy. Khrushchev yanked off his shoe and began banging it on his desk. This behavior by Khrushchev scandalized his delegation.

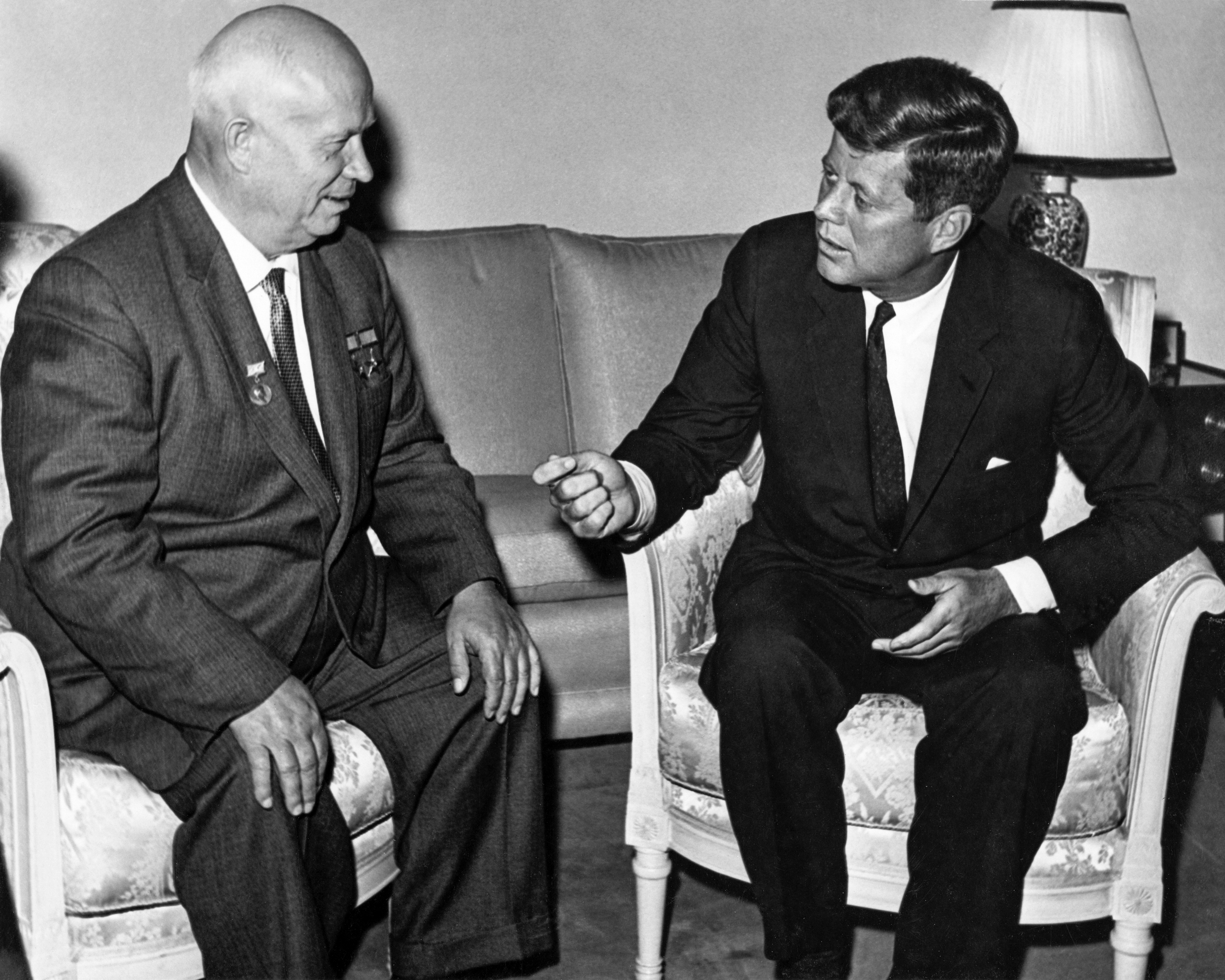
Khrushchev and John F. Kennedy, Vienna, June 1961

Khrushchev considered U.S. Vice President Nixon a hardliner and was delighted by his defeat in the 1960 presidential election. He considered the victor, John F. Kennedy, as a far more likely partner for détente, but was taken aback by the newly inaugurated U.S. President's tough talk and actions in the early days of his administration. Khrushchev achieved a propaganda victory in April 1961 with the first human spaceflight, while Kennedy suffered a defeat with the failure of the Bay of Pigs invasion. While Khrushchev had threatened to defend Cuba with Soviet missiles, the premier contented himself with after-the-fact aggressive remarks. The failure in Cuba led to Kennedy's determination to make no concessions at the Vienna summit scheduled for 3 June 1961. Both Kennedy and Khrushchev took a hard line, with Khrushchev demanding a treaty that would recognize the two German states and refusing to yield on the remaining issues obstructing a test-ban treaty. Kennedy, in contrast, had been led to believe that the test-ban treaty could be concluded at the summit, and felt that a deal on Berlin had to await easing of east–west tensions.

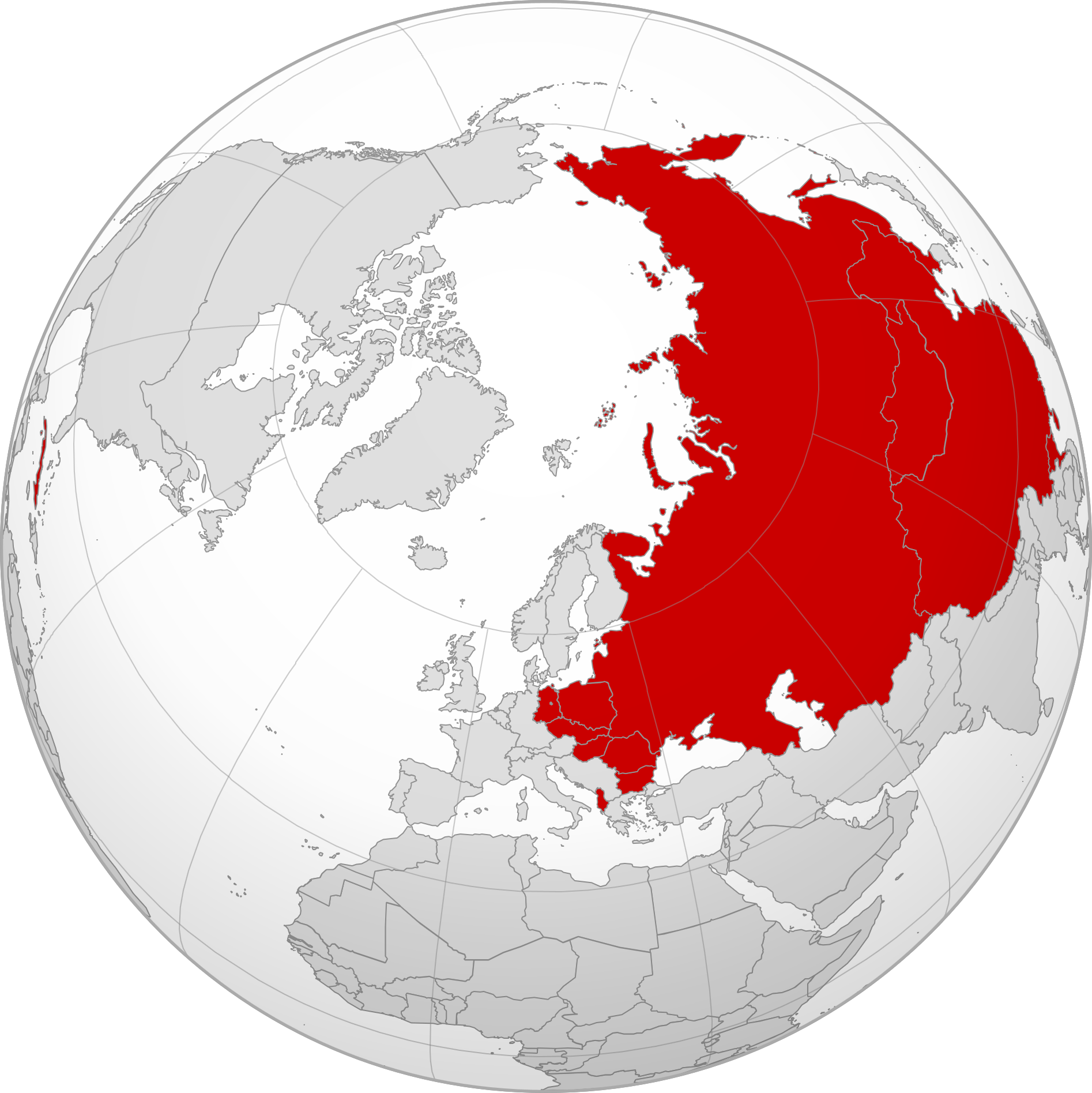
The maximum territorial extent of countries in the world under Soviet influence, after the Cuban Revolution of 1959 and before the official Sino-Soviet split of 1961

An indefinite postponement of action over Berlin was unacceptable to Khrushchev if for no other reason than that East Germany was suffering a continuous brain drain as highly educated East Germans fled west through Berlin. While the boundary between the two German states had elsewhere been fortified, Berlin, administered by the four Allied powers, remained open. Emboldened by statements from former U.S. Ambassador to Moscow Charles E. Bohlen and United States Senate Committee on Foreign Relations Chairman J. William Fulbright that East Germany had every right to close its borders, Khrushchev authorized East German leader Walter Ulbricht to begin construction of what became known as the Berlin Wall. Construction preparations were made in great secrecy, and the border was sealed off in the early hours of Sunday, 13 August 1961, when most East German workers who earned hard currency by working in West Berlin would be at their homes. The wall was a propaganda disaster and marked the end of Khrushchev's attempts to conclude a peace treaty among the Four Powers and the two German states.

==== Cuban Missile Crisis and the test ban treaty (1962–1964) ====
Superpower tensions culminated in the Cuban Missile Crisis (in the USSR, the "Caribbean crisis") of October 1962, as the Soviet Union sought to install medium-range nuclear missiles in Cuba, about 90 miles (140 km) from the U.S. coast. Cuban Prime Minister Fidel Castro was reluctant to accept the missiles, and, once he was persuaded, warned Khrushchev against transporting the missiles in secret. Castro stated, thirty years later, "We had a sovereign right to accept the missiles. We were not violating international law. Why do it secretly—as if we had no right to do it? I warned Nikita that secrecy would give the imperialists the advantage."

On 16 October, Kennedy was informed that U-2 flights over Cuba had discovered what were most likely medium-range missile sites, and though he and his advisors considered approaching Khrushchev through diplomatic channels, they could come up with no way of doing this that would not appear weak. On 22 October, Kennedy addressed his nation by television, revealing the missiles' presence and announcing a blockade of Cuba. Informed in advance of the speech but not (until one hour before) the content, Khrushchev and his advisors feared an invasion of Cuba. Even before Kennedy's speech, they ordered Soviet commanders in Cuba that they could use all weapons against an attack—except atomic weapons.

As the crisis unfolded, tensions were high in the U.S.; less so in the Soviet Union, where Khrushchev made several public appearances and went to the Bolshoi Theatre to hear American opera singer Jerome Hines. By 25 October, with the Soviets unclear about Kennedy's full intentions, Khrushchev decided that the missiles would have to be withdrawn from Cuba. Khrushchev agreed to withdraw the missiles in exchange for a U.S. promise not to invade Cuba and a secret promise that the U.S. would withdraw missiles from Turkey. As the last term was not publicly announced at the request of the U.S., and was not known until just before Khrushchev's death in 1971, the resolution was seen as a great defeat for the Soviets and contributed to Khrushchev's fall less than two years later. Castro had urged Khrushchev to launch a preemptive nuclear attack on the U.S. in the event of an invasion of Cuba, and was angered by the outcome, referring to Khrushchev in profane terms.

After the crisis, superpower relations improved, as Kennedy gave a conciliatory speech on 10 June 1963, recognizing the Soviet people's suffering during World War II, and paying tribute to their achievements. Khrushchev called the speech the best by a U.S. president since Franklin D. Roosevelt, and, in July, negotiated a test ban treaty with U.S. negotiator Averell Harriman and Lord Hailsham of the United Kingdom. Plans for a second Khrushchev-Kennedy summit were dashed by Kennedy's assassination in November 1963. The new U.S. president, Lyndon Johnson, hoped for continued improved relations but was distracted by other issues and had little opportunity to develop a relationship with Khrushchev before the premier was ousted.

==== Eastern Europe ====
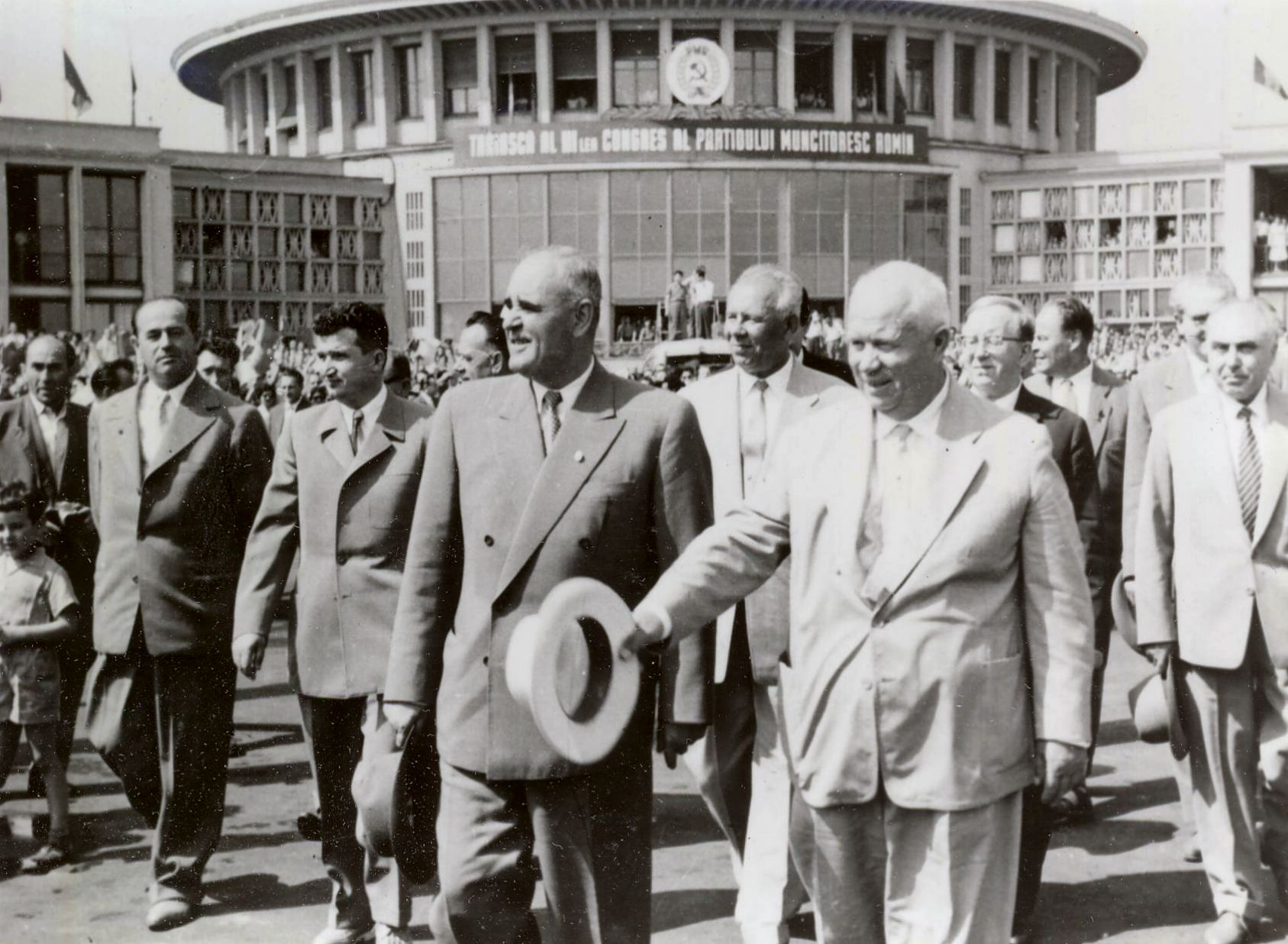
Khrushchev and Gheorghe Gheorghiu-Dej at Bucharest's Băneasa Airport in June 1960. Nicolae Ceaușescu can be seen at Gheorghiu-Dej's right-hand side.

The Secret Speech, combined with the death of the Polish communist leader Bolesław Bierut, who suffered a heart attack while reading the Speech, sparked considerable liberalization in Poland and Hungary. In Poland, a worker's strike in Poznań developed into disturbances that left more than 50 dead in June 1956. When Moscow blamed the disturbances on Western agitators, Polish leaders ignored the claim and made concessions to the workers. With anti-Soviet displays becoming more common in Poland, and crucial Polish leadership elections upcoming, Khrushchev and other Presidium members flew to Warsaw on 19 October to meet with the Polish Presidium. The Soviets agreed to allow the new Polish leadership to take office, on the assurance there would be no change to the Soviet-Polish relationship.

The Polish settlement emboldened the Hungarians. A mass demonstration in Budapest on 23 October turned into a popular uprising. In response, Hungarian Party leaders installed reformist Premier Imre Nagy. Soviet forces in the city clashed with Hungarians and fired on demonstrators, with hundreds of both Hungarians and Soviets killed. Nagy called for a cease-fire and a withdrawal of Soviet troops, which a Khrushchev-led majority in the Presidium decided to obey, choosing to give the new Hungarian government a chance.

On 30 October Nagy announced multiparty elections, and the next morning that Hungary would leave the Warsaw Pact. On 3 November, two members of the Nagy government appeared in Ukraine as the self-proclaimed heads of a provisional government and demanded Soviet intervention, which was forthcoming. The next day, Soviet troops crushed the Hungarian uprising, with a death toll of 4,000 Hungarians and several hundred Soviet troops. Nagy was arrested and later executed. Despite the international outrage over the intervention, Khrushchev defended his actions for the rest of his life. Damage to Soviet foreign relations was severe and would have been greater were it not for the timing of the Suez crisis, which distracted world attention.

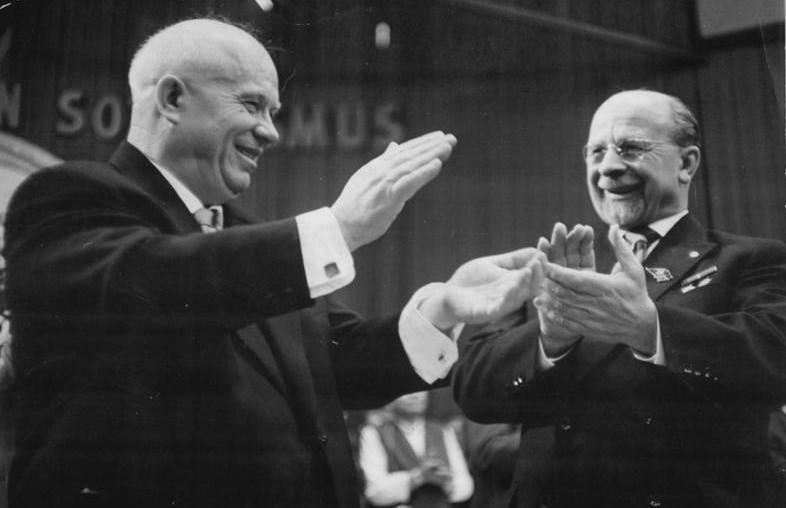
Khrushchev (left) and East German leader Walter Ulbricht, 1963

In the aftermath of these crises, Khrushchev made the statement for which he became well-remembered, "We will bury you". While many in the West took this statement as a threat, Khrushchev made the statement in a speech on peaceful coexistence with the West. When questioned about the statement during his 1959 U.S. visit, Khrushchev stated that he was not referring to a literal burial, but that, through inexorable historical development, communism would replace capitalism.

Khrushchev greatly improved relations with Yugoslavia, which had been entirely sundered in 1948 when Stalin realized he could not control Yugoslav leader Josip Tito. Khrushchev led a Soviet delegation to Belgrade in 1955. He was successful in warming relations, ending the Informbiro period. During the Hungarian crisis, Tito initially supported Nagy, but Khrushchev persuaded him of the need for intervention. Still, the intervention in Hungary damaged Moscow's relationship with Belgrade, which Khrushchev spent several years trying to repair. He was hampered by the fact that China disapproved of Yugoslavia's reformist socialism and attempts to conciliate Belgrade resulted in an angry Beijing.

==== China ====
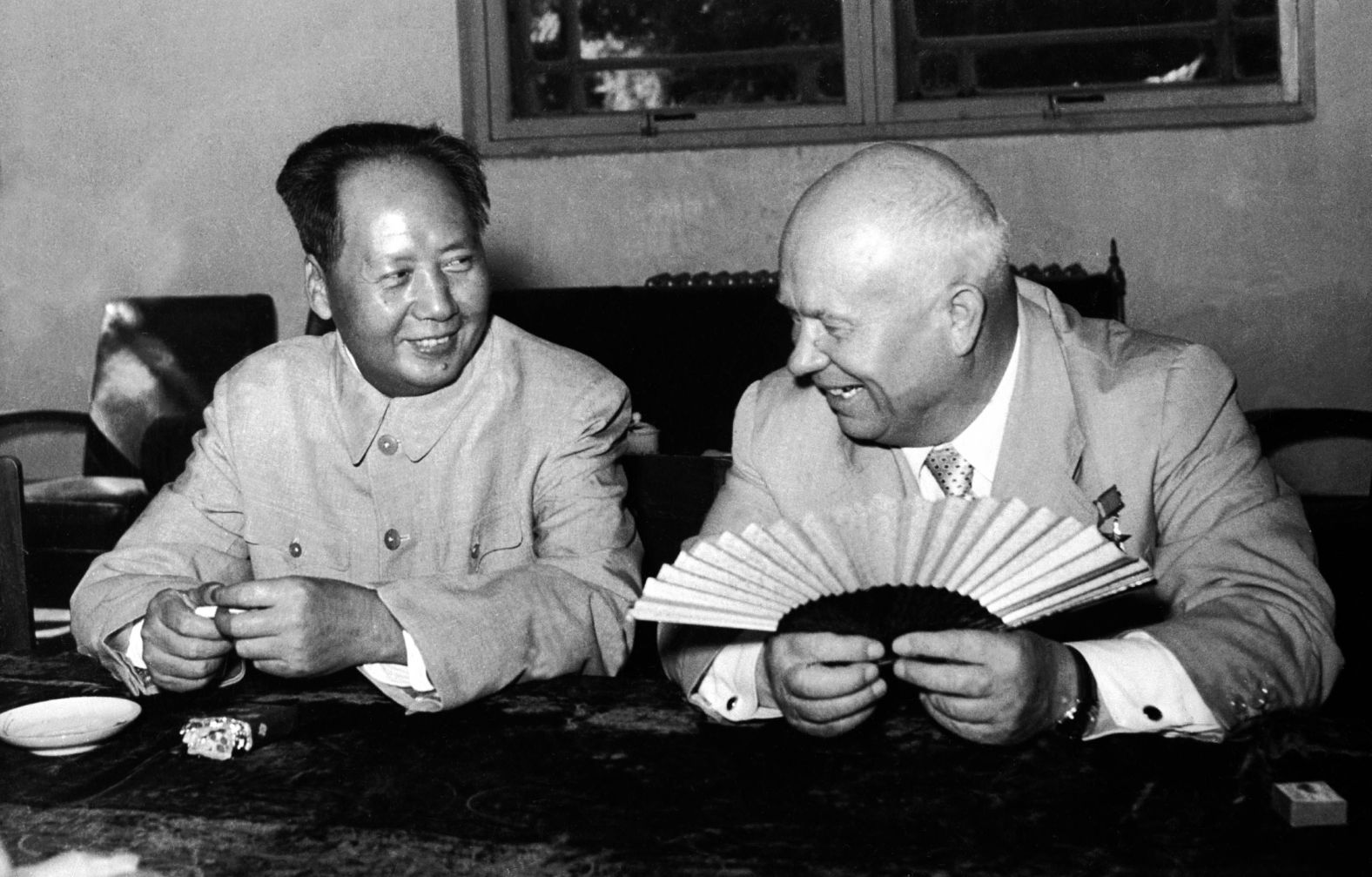
Khrushchev with Mao Zedong, 1958

After completing his takeover of mainland China in 1949, Mao Zedong sought material assistance from the USSR, and also called for the return to China of territories taken from it under the Tsars. Khrushchev increased aid to China, even sending a small corps of experts to help develop the new communist country. This assistance was described by historian William C. Kirby as "the greatest transfer of technology in world history". The Soviet Union spent 7% of its national income between 1954 and 1959 on aid to China. On his 1954 visit to China, Khrushchev agreed to return Port Arthur and Dalian to China, though Khrushchev was annoyed by Mao's insistence that the Soviets leave their artillery.

Mao bitterly opposed Khrushchev's attempts to reach a rapprochement with more liberal Eastern European states such as Yugoslavia. Khrushchev's government was reluctant to endorse Mao's desires for an assertive worldwide revolutionary movement, preferring to conquer capitalism through raising the standard of living in communist-bloc countries.

Relations between the two nations began to cool in 1956, with Mao angered both by the Secret Speech and by the fact that the Chinese had not been consulted in advance about it. Mao believed that de-Stalinization was a mistake and a possible threat to his own authority. When Khrushchev visited Beijing in 1958, Mao refused proposals for military cooperation. Hoping to torpedo Khrushchev's efforts at détente with the U.S., Mao soon thereafter provoked the Second Taiwan Strait Crisis, describing the Taiwanese islands as "batons that keep Eisenhower and Khrushchev dancing, scurrying this way and that."

The Soviets had planned to provide China with an atomic bomb and full documentation, but in 1959, amid cooler relations, the Soviets destroyed the device and papers instead. When Khrushchev visited China in September, shortly after his successful U.S. visit, he met a chilly reception, and left the country on the third day of a planned seven-day visit. Relations continued to deteriorate in 1960, as both the USSR and China used a Romanian Communist Party congress as an opportunity to attack the other. Khrushchev responded by pulling Soviet experts out of China.

==== West Africa ====
Under Khrushchev, the Soviet Union provided considerable aid to the newly independent Ghana and Guinea. These were seen as ideal places to test the "socialist model of development" because of their critical dependence on economic cooperation with the Soviet Union, in contrast to larger Third World nations like Egypt and Indonesia. This project proved to be a resounding failure, although the lessons learned would have an important influence on Soviet foreign policy towards Africa in the following decades. The Soviet Union's display of ineptitude during the Congo Crisis, where it failed to prevent both the newly independent Republic of the Congo from descending into chaos and the substantial military intervention by Western powers, led to a further cooling of relations between the Soviet Union and its Ghanaian and Guinean partners.

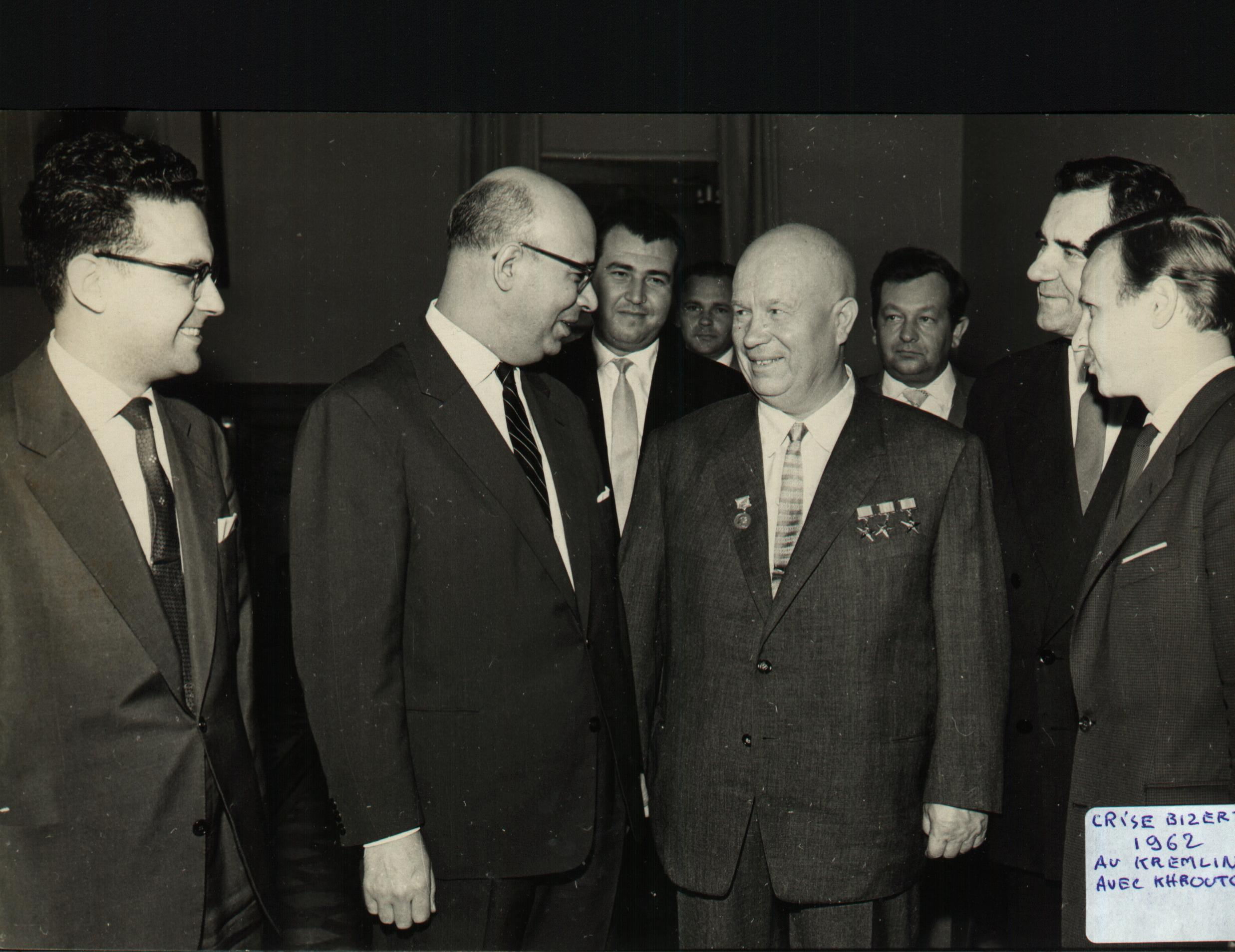
On 5 August 1961, Khrushchev and Foreign Minister Andrei Gromyko meet with Tunisia's Foreign Minister Sadok Mokaddem and Ambassador Ahmed Mestiri at the Kremlin to discuss Soviet support to Tunisia during the Bizerte crisis with France.

== Removal ==
Universal Newsreel about Khrushchev's resignation

Beginning in March 1964, Supreme Soviet presidium chairman and thus nominal head of state Leonid Brezhnev began plotting Khrushchev's removal with his colleagues. While Brezhnev considered having Khrushchev arrested as he returned from a trip to Scandinavia in June, he instead persuaded members of the Central Committee to support the ousting of Khrushchev, remembering how crucial the committee's support had been to Khrushchev in defeating the Anti-Party Group plot. Brezhnev had ample time for his conspiracy, as Khrushchev was absent from Moscow for a total of five months between January and September 1964.

The conspirators, led by Brezhnev, First Deputy Premier Alexander Shelepin, and KGB chairman Vladimir Semichastny, struck in October 1964, while Khrushchev was on vacation at Pitsunda with his friend and Presidium colleague Anastas Mikoyan. On 12 October, Brezhnev called Khrushchev to notify him of a special Presidium meeting to be held the following day, ostensibly about agriculture. Even though Khrushchev suspected the real reason for the meeting, he flew to Moscow, accompanied by the head of the Georgian KGB, General Aleksi Inauri, but otherwise taking no precautions.

Khrushchev arrived at the VIP hall of Vnukovo Airport; KGB chairman Semichastny waited for him there, flanked by KGB guards. Semichastny informed Khrushchev of his ouster and told him not to resist. The plotters' coup went off smoothly; Khrushchev felt betrayed by Semichastny, as he considered him a friend, not suspecting that he had joined his enemies within the Party. Khrushchev was then taken to the Kremlin, to be verbally attacked by Brezhnev, Suslov and Shelepin. He put up little resistance. Semichastny was careful not to create the appearance of a coup:

I didn't even close the Kremlin to visitors. People were strolling around outside, while in the room the Presidium was meeting. I deployed my men around the Kremlin. Everything that was necessary was done. Brezhnev and Shelepin were nervous. I told them: Let's not do anything that isn't necessary. Let's not create the appearance of a coup.

That night, after his ouster, Khrushchev called Mikoyan:

I'm old and tired. Let them cope by themselves. I've done the main thing. Could anyone have dreamed of telling Stalin that he didn't suit us anymore and suggesting he retire? Not even a wet spot would have remained where we had been standing. Now everything is different. The fear is gone, and we can talk as equals. That's my contribution. I won't put up a fight.

On 14 October 1964, the Presidium and the Central Committee voted to accept Khrushchev's "voluntary" request to retire for reasons of "advanced age and ill health." Brezhnev was elected First Secretary, while Alexei Kosygin succeeded Khrushchev as premier.

== Life in retirement ==
Khrushchev was granted a pension of 500 rubles per month and was given a house, a dacha and a car. Following his removal, he fell into deep depression. He received few visitors, especially since his security guards reported all visits. His pension was reduced to 400 rubles per month, though his retirement remained comfortable by Soviet standards. One of his grandsons was asked what the ex-premier was doing in retirement, and the boy replied, "Grandfather cries." Khrushchev was made a non-person to such an extent that the thirty-volume Great Soviet Encyclopedia omitted him from the list of prominent political commissars during World War II.

As the new rulers made known their conservatism in artistic matters, Khrushchev came to be more favorably viewed by artists and writers, some of whom visited him. One visitor whom Khrushchev regretted not seeing was former U.S. Vice President Nixon, who went to Khrushchev's Moscow apartment while the former premier was at his dacha.

Khrushchev began his memoirs in 1966. He initially tried to dictate them into a tape recorder while outdoors, in an attempt to avoid eavesdropping by the KGB. These attempts failed due to background noise, so he switched to recording indoors. The KGB made no attempt to interfere until 1968, when Khrushchev was ordered to hand over his tapes; he refused. While Khrushchev was hospitalized with heart ailments, his son Sergei was approached by the KGB in July 1970 and told that there was a plot afoot by foreign agents to steal the memoirs. Sergei Khrushchev handed over the materials to the KGB since the KGB could steal the originals anyway, but copies had been made, some of which had been transmitted to a Western publisher. Sergei instructed that the smuggled memoirs should be published, which they were in 1970 under the title Khrushchev Remembers. Under some pressure, Nikita Khrushchev signed a statement that he had not given the materials to any publisher, and his son was transferred to a less desirable job. Upon publication of the memoirs in the West, Izvestia denounced them as a fraud. Soviet state radio carried the announcement of Khrushchev's statement; it was the first time in six years that he had been mentioned in that medium.

== Death ==
Khrushchev died of a heart attack around noon in the Moscow Central Clinical Hospital on 11 September 1971, at the age of 77. He was denied a state funeral with interment in the Kremlin Wall and was instead buried in the Novodevichy Cemetery in Moscow. Fearing demonstrations, the authorities did not announce Khrushchev's death until the hour of his wake, held in a morgue in the southern suburbs of Moscow, and surrounded the cemetery with troops. Even so, some artists and writers joined the family for the interment.

Pravda ran a one-sentence announcement of the former premier's death; Western newspapers contained considerable coverage. New York Times Moscow correspondent Harry Schwartz wrote, "Mr. Khrushchev opened the doors and windows of a petrified structure. He let in fresh air and fresh ideas, producing changes which time already has shown are irreversible and fundamental."

== Legacy ==
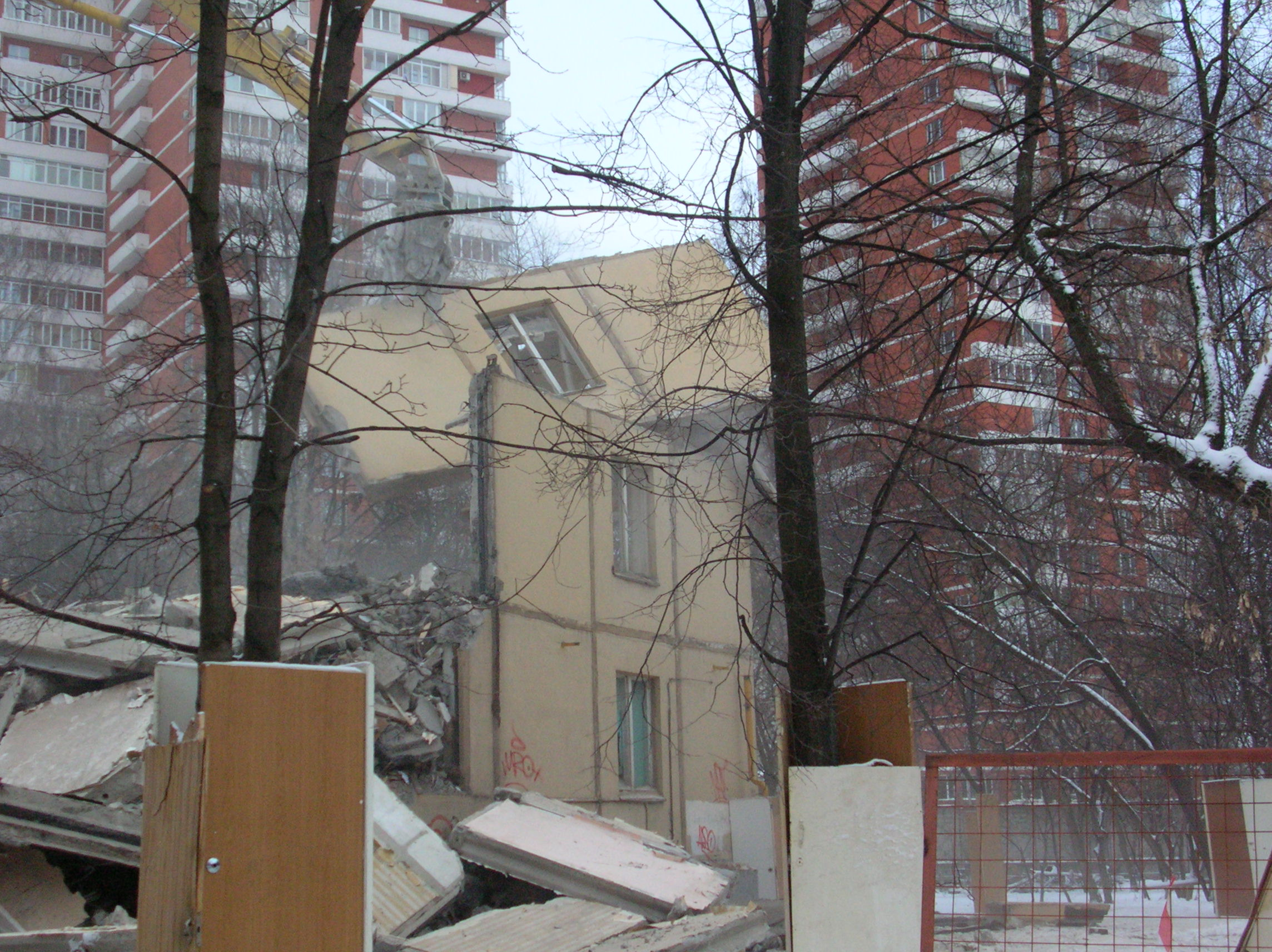
A khrushchyovka is destroyed, Moscow, January 2008

Many of Khrushchev's innovations were reversed after his fall. The requirement that one-third of officials be replaced at each election was overturned, as was the division in the Party structure between industrial and agricultural sectors. His vocational education program for high school students was dropped, and his plan for sending existing agricultural institutions out to the land was ended. However, new agricultural or vocational institutions thereafter were located outside major cities. When new housing was built, much of it was in the form of high rises rather than Khrushchev's low-rise structures.

Historian Robert Service summarizes Khrushchev's contradictory personality traits:

[he was] at once a Stalinist and an anti-Stalinist, a communist believer and a cynic, a self-publicizing poltroon and a crusty philanthropist, a trouble-maker and a peacemaker, a stimulating colleague and a domineering boor, a statesman and a politicker who was out of his intellectual depth.

Some of Khrushchev's agricultural projects were easily overturned. Corn became so unpopular in 1965 that its planting fell to the lowest level in the postwar period. Lysenko was stripped of his policy-making positions. However, the MTS stations remained closed, and the basic agricultural problems, which Khrushchev had tried to address, remained. While the Soviet standard of living increased greatly in the ten years after Khrushchev's fall, much of the increase was due to industrial progress; agriculture continued to lag far behind, resulting in regular agricultural crises, especially in 1972 and 1975. Brezhnev and his successors continued Khrushchev's precedent of buying grain from the West rather than suffer shortfalls and starvation. Neither Brezhnev nor his colleagues were personally popular, and the new government relied on authoritarian power. The government's conservative tendencies would lead to the crushing of the "Prague Spring" of 1968.

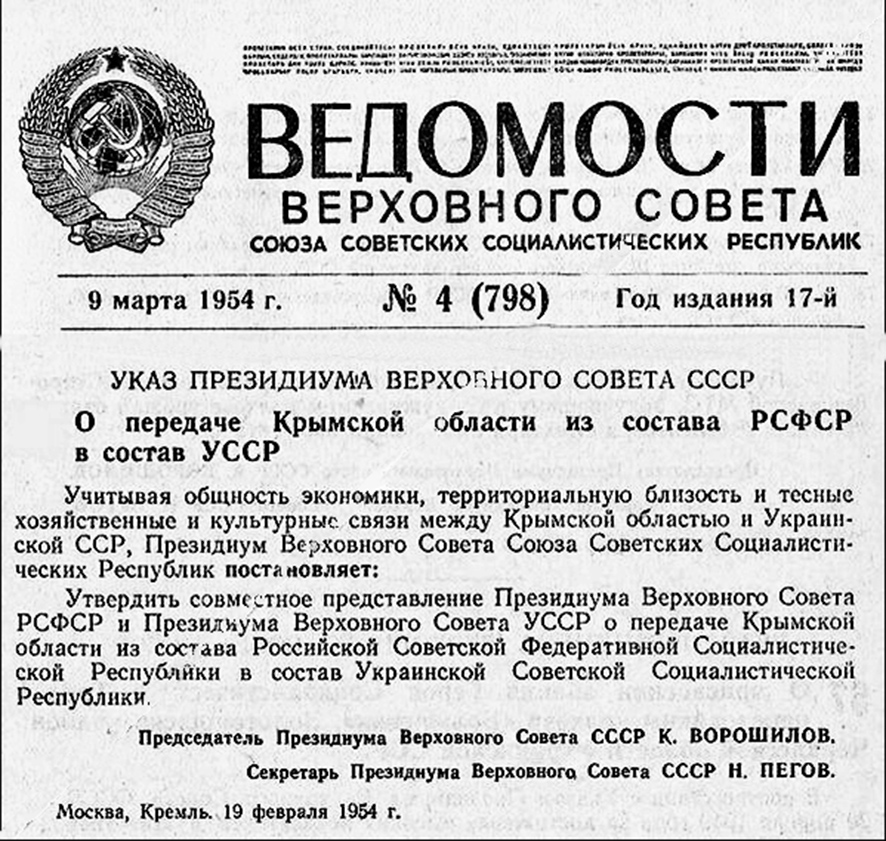
Decree of the Presidium of the Supreme Soviet "On the transfer of the Crimean Oblast". In 1954, the Soviet leadership, which included Khrushchev, transferred Crimea from Russian SFSR to Ukrainian SSR.

Though Khrushchev's strategy failed to achieve the major goals he sought, Aleksandr Fursenko, who wrote a book analyzing Khrushchev's foreign and military policies, argued that the strategy did coerce the West in a limited manner. The agreement that the US would not invade Cuba has been adhered to. The refusal of the western world to acknowledge East Germany was gradually eroded, and, in 1975, the US and other NATO members signed the Helsinki Agreement with the USSR and Warsaw Pact nations.

The Russian public's view of Khrushchev remains mixed. According to a major Russian pollster, the only eras of the 20th century that Russians in the 21st century evaluate positively are those under Nicholas II and under Khrushchev. A poll in 1998 of young Russians found that they felt Nicholas II had done more good than harm, and all other 20th-century Russian leaders more harm than good—except Khrushchev, about whom they were evenly divided. Khrushchev biographer William Tompson related the former premier's reforms to those which occurred later:

Throughout the Brezhnev years and the lengthy interregnum that followed, the generation which had come of age during the "first Russian spring" of the 1950s awaited its turn in power. As Brezhnev and his colleagues died or were pensioned off, they were replaced by men and women for whom the Secret Speech and the first wave of de-Stalinization had been a formative experience, and these "Children of Twentieth Congress" took up the reins of power under the leadership of Mikhail Gorbachev and his colleagues. The Khrushchev era provided this second generation of reformers with both an inspiration and a cautionary tale.

== See also ==
- 1954 transfer of Crimea
- History of the Soviet Union (1953–1964)
- Outline of the Cold War

== Citations ==
Political offices
Preceded by Nikolai Bulganin	Premier of the Soviet Union; 1958–1964	Succeeded by Alexei Kosygin
Preceded by Leonid Korniyets	Chairman of the Council of Ministers of the Ukrainian SSR; 1944–1947	Succeeded by Demian Korotchenko
Party political offices
Preceded by Joseph Stalin as General Secretary	First Secretary of the Central Committee of the Communist Party of the Soviet Union; 1953–1964	Succeeded by Leonid Brezhnev
Preceded by Georgiy Popov	First Secretary of the Moscow Regional Committee; 1949–1953	Succeeded by Nikolai Mikhailov
Preceded by Lazar Kaganovich; Stanislav Kosior	First Secretary of the Communist Party of Ukraine; 1947–1949; 1938–1947	Succeeded by Leonid Melnikov; Lazar Kaganovich
Preceded by Dmitriy Yevtushenko	First Secretary of the Kiev City/Regional Committee; 1938–1947	Succeeded by Zinoviy Serdiuk
Preceded by Lazar Kaganovich	First Secretary of the Moscow City/Regional Committee; 1935–1938	Succeeded by Aleksandr Ugarov
