= Bulgaria–Russia relations =

- Bulgaria: Russia

Diplomatic mission
- Embassy of Bulgaria in Moscow: Embassy of Russia in Sofia

Envoy
- Ambassador Atanas Krystin: Ambassador Eleonora Mitrofanova

Bulgaria–Russia relations (Bulgarian: Отношения между България и Русия, romanized: Otnosheniya mezhdu Bulgariya i Rusiya, Russian: Отношения между Болгарией и Россией, romanized: Otnosheniya mezhdu Bolgariey i Rossiey) are the diplomatic relations between Bulgaria and Russia.

Bulgaria has an embassy in Moscow and three consulates in Saint Petersburg, Novosibirsk and Yekaterinburg. Russia has an embassy in Sofia and two consulates in Ruse and Varna.

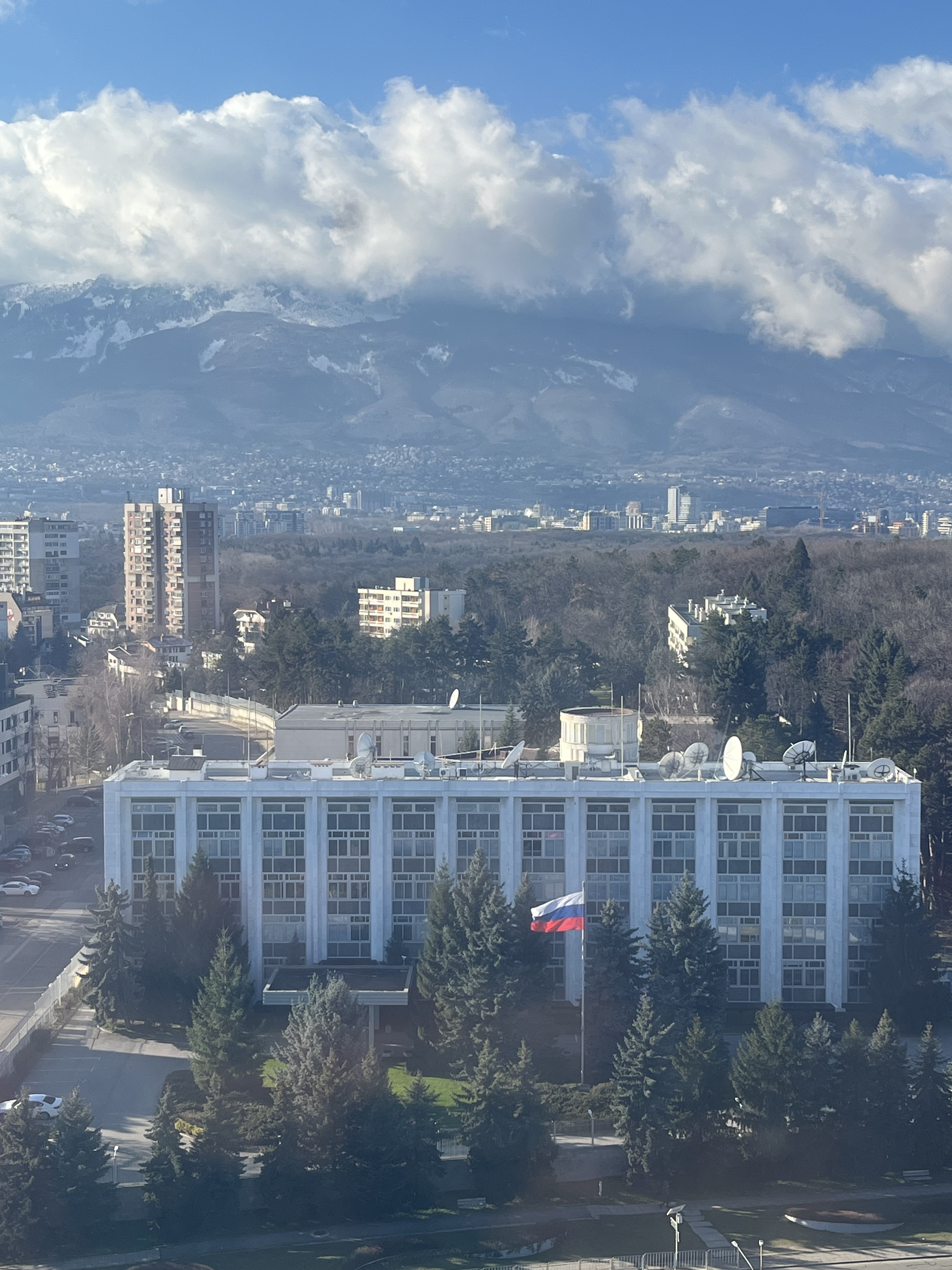
Russian Embassy, Sofia, seen from Hotel Moskva

Both countries are Slavic and majority Orthodox Christian. However, these shared traits have not translated into warm relations for the most part. After Bulgarian independence in the 19th century, relations turned tense when Russia consistently favored Bulgaria's neighbor Serbia over Bulgaria in various Balkan disputes and wars before World War I, followed by Bulgaria siding with Germany against Russia in both world wars.

After a USSR-backed coup d'état in 1944, Bulgaria became a Soviet satellite state during the Cold War. As such, the then People's Republic of Bulgaria maintained good a relationship with the Soviet Union until the Revolutions of 1989, the only major period since independence where Russia/the USSR had better relations with Bulgaria than with Serbia; or rather in this case Tito's Yugoslavia. However, following woes over energy projects including the cancelled South Stream pipeline and Belene Nuclear Power Plant project, as well as the 2014 annexation of Crimea and subsequent 2022 Russo-Ukrainian war, the relationship has once again deteriorated.

== History ==
=== Early relations ===
The citizens of modern-day Russia and Bulgaria have been in contact for centuries. The Cyrillic alphabet originated in the 9th century First Bulgarian Empire and was later accepted by the Orthodox Slavic countries as their standard alphabet. Spiritually, Russia received Orthodox Christianity precisely from the Bulgarian Empire, and it is assumed that this happened during the time of the Bulgarian Emperor Samuil. With this act, Bulgaria practically Christianized and civilized the vast Slavic sea and thus annexed this space to the old Bulgarian literature and culture. Both nations had a tradition of calling monarchs tsars, a Slavic word for emperor that also originated in Bulgaria. Russia helped Bulgaria gain sovereignty from the Ottoman Empire. The Bulgarians then built an Orthodox church in Sofia that was named after the Russian Orthodox saint Alexander Nevsky, in honor of the Russian soldiers who helped Bulgaria during that war.

In Russia, the Bulgarian contribution to the spread of Slavic literature and Christian worship is also known as the "first South Slavic influence". Centuries later, during the time of the Second Bulgarian Empire, Russia experienced the so-called "second South Slavic influence" - this time under the auspices of the Tarnovo School of Literature. After the fall of the Second Bulgarian Empire under Ottoman rule, a huge part of the Bulgarian missionaries and clergy found refuge outside their homeland, with some of them settling precisely in the Russian principalities. Cyprian of Kiev is such an example.

Relations between the two started to worsen when Russia refused to diplomatically support Bulgaria in the Bulgarian unification and the following Serbo-Bulgarian War. This had a serious impact on Bulgarian–Russian relations, which continues to the modern day.

=== 20th century ===
Bulgaria and Russia's relations continued to fall as Bulgaria accused Russia of meddling in its internal affairs, a fact that contributed to a growing alliance between the Russian Empire and the Kingdom of Serbia. This led to antagonism between Bulgaria and Russia even when Russia motivated Bulgaria to form an alliance with Montenegro, Serbia and Greece to drive the Austrians away. When Bulgaria got a chance to occupy Constantinople during the First Balkan War against the Ottoman Empire, Russia opposed Bulgarian military actions. Russia also refused to condemn Serbia and Greece for attacking Bulgaria in the consequent war. But tensions between Bulgaria and Russia eventually erupted in the World War I when Bulgaria sided with German Empire over the promise to regain its lost soil. Eventually, Bulgaria and Russia suffered heavy military losses for their wars, and Bulgarian–Russian relations severed. It was not until the 1930s that Russia, as the Soviet Union, established relations with Bulgaria.

In World War II, Bulgaria started as a member of the Axis powers, but when the Soviets invaded the Balkans, Bulgaria joined the Allied powers on the Soviet side. The Soviet Red Army backed the Bulgarian coup d'état of 1944, which brought the Bulgarian Communist Party (BCP) to power. British Prime Minister Winston Churchill and Soviet First Secretary Joseph Stalin signed the secret percentages agreement at the Fourth Moscow Conference allowing the Soviet Union 80 percent of influence in Bulgaria after the war.

Bulgaria–Soviet Union relations
- Bulgaria: Soviet Union

From 1945 to 1948, the country became entrenched within the Soviet sphere of influence under the control of the Bulgarian Communist Party, which oversaw a program of Stalinization in the late 1940s and 1950s, and joined the Warsaw Pact in 1955. Political repression was widespread. Bulgaria became highly dependent on Soviet patronage. Soviet technical and financial aid enabled it to rapidly industrialize. The USSR provided Bulgaria with energy and a market for its goods. Bulgaria also received large-scale military aid from the Soviet Union, worth US$16.7 billion between 1946 and 1990. Bulgaria remained part of the Eastern Bloc until 1989, when the BCP began to drift away from the USSR. The first multi-party elections were held in 1990 and the BCP lost power in elections the following year.

Georgi Ivanov, a military officer from Bulgaria became the first Bulgarian to reach outer space when he boarded Soyuz 33 along with Soviet cosmonaut Nikolai Rukavishnikov. Bulgarian scientists were involved in preparations for the flight. During this era, Bulgaria was governed by Todor Zhivkov, a close friend of Nikita Khrushchev.

=== 1989–2021 ===
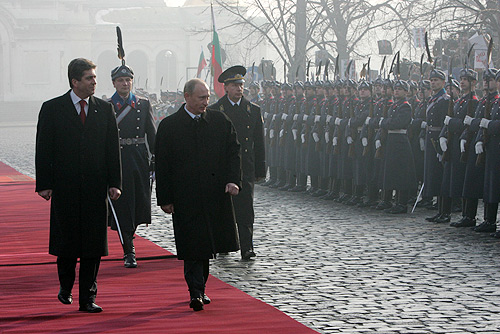
Russian President Vladimir Putin in Bulgaria, January 2008.

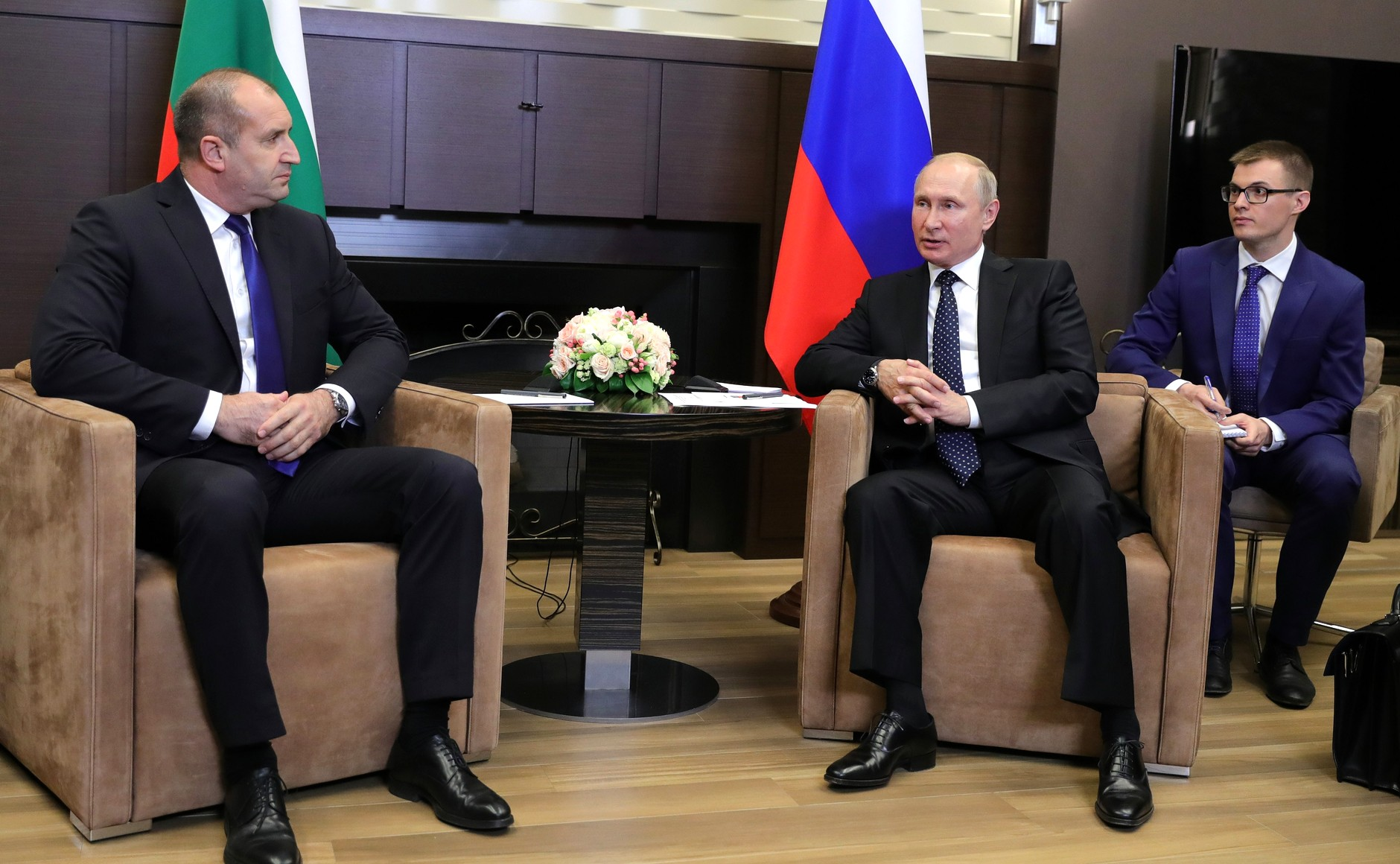
Bulgarian President Rumen Radev with Russian President Vladimir Putin in Sochi, 22 May 2018

After the fall of communism in 1989, Bulgaria–Russia relations entered a new stage. Relations were affected by the political orientation of the party in power. The left was more supportive of close relations than the right. Russian attempts to interfere continued after the People's Republic of Bulgaria and the Soviet Union collapsed. That led to the expulsion of two Russian diplomats during the Union of Democratic Forces government in March 2001 as Ivan Kostov, the Prime Minister of Bulgaria, was made aware of attempts to remove the Bulgarian government by Russian agents in the Bulgarian government, only five months before the legitimate end of the government term. Relations between the two remained moderate despite Bulgaria's integration with Western Europe and the United States. Bulgaria joined NATO in 2004 and the European Union in 2007.

A later President, Georgi Parvanov of the Bulgarian Socialist Party, sought energy cooperation in a programme that he termed a 'Grand Slam'. Although he managed to obtain two terms in office, for the most part he lacked public support. Most agreements were later revised, with successful projects given a chance, while unsuccessful efforts were stopped, such as NPP Belene, which was halted due to the unprofitable nature of the project for the Bulgarian side. This was opposed by former Prime Minister and current Party of European Socialists leader Sergei Stanishev, who had promised to replace the right wing government of Boyko Borisov.

Bulgaria was deemed "unfriendly to Russia" on 30 of April 2021, because of the expulsion of several diplomats. This was, however, later confirmed to not be true, as on the 14 of May 2021, the Russian government's officially released list of unfriendly countries contained only two other countries – the Czech Republic and the United States.

=== From 2022 ===
After the 2022 Russian invasion of Ukraine started, Bulgaria, as one of the EU countries, imposed sanctions on Russia, and Russia added all EU countries to the list of "unfriendly nations".

On 24 March 2022, the Bulgarian prime minister announced the recalling of the Bulgarian ambassador in Moscow for consultations, in the wake of "undiplomatic, sharp and rude" comments reportedly said by the Russian ambassador to Bulgaria, Eleonora Mitrofanova.

In the evening of 27 June the Russian embassy in Sofia launched a charity appeal for Bulgarians to support the Russian invasion of Ukraine. One day later, Petkov announced the expulsion of 70 Russian diplomats over concerns of espionage. The Ministry of Foreign Affairs announced that Bulgaria would be temporarily closing down its diplomatic mission in Yekaterinburg and expected Russia to temporarily halt the activities of its own mission in Ruse, Bulgaria. All services of the Russian embassy were halted, and Bulgaria stipulated that Russia must follow from thenceforth the official standard of limiting their numbers to 23 diplomatic staff and 25 administrative staff. Misinformation promulgated by Russia in Bulgaria is being countered by the government of Bulgaria.

Russia is suspected of being behind an explosion at an arms factory in Bulgaria in June 2023, it follows a series of similar incidents at arms depots housing ammunition meant to be exported to Ukraine. In June 2023 Bulgaria decided to supply weapons directly to Ukraine and in July 2023 endorsed a decision to join the European Defence Agency’s Collaborative Procurement of Ammunition project in support of Ukraine.

The Prime Minister of Bulgaria, Nikolai Denkov stated "Russia must definitely withdraw from the territory of Ukraine, recognize its borders, and be held accountable for the crimes it has committed," when meeting the President of Ukraine, Volodymyr Zelenskyy in July 2023.

Bulgaria is close to selling two unused Russian-made nuclear reactors and other critical equipment to Ukraine's state-owned atomic energy company.

In July Bulgaria took over the Rosenets oil terminal at the port of Burgas, run by Lukoil, with the Russian company losing its long term concession. In October Bulgaria passed a law taxing Lukoil refinery at 60% of revenue, resulting in Lukoil trying to find a buyer for the refinery. A new owner would pay a lower rate of 15% of revenue. Bulgaria also passed a law taxing gas in transit from Russia to Hungary, Serbia and Bosnia and Herzegovina at 20 levs, around 20% of the current natural gas price, with Gazprom likely to be suffering the financial loss. The gas transit tax was suspended shortly afterwards.

== Trade ==
In 2021, Bulgarian exports to Russia were $592 million with medication being the top product. Russian exports were $2.78 billion with natural gas being the main product. Between 1996 and 2021 Bulgarian exports have risen by an average of 0.71% p.a. whereas Russian exports rose by 1.39% p.a. on average.

In April 2022, Russia ceased supplying gas to Bulgaria. Bulgaria ceased buying Russian crude oil on 1 March 2024.

== Resident diplomatic missions ==
- Bulgaria has an embassy in Moscow and a consulate-general in Saint Petersburg.
- Russia has an embassy in Sofia and a consulate in Varna.
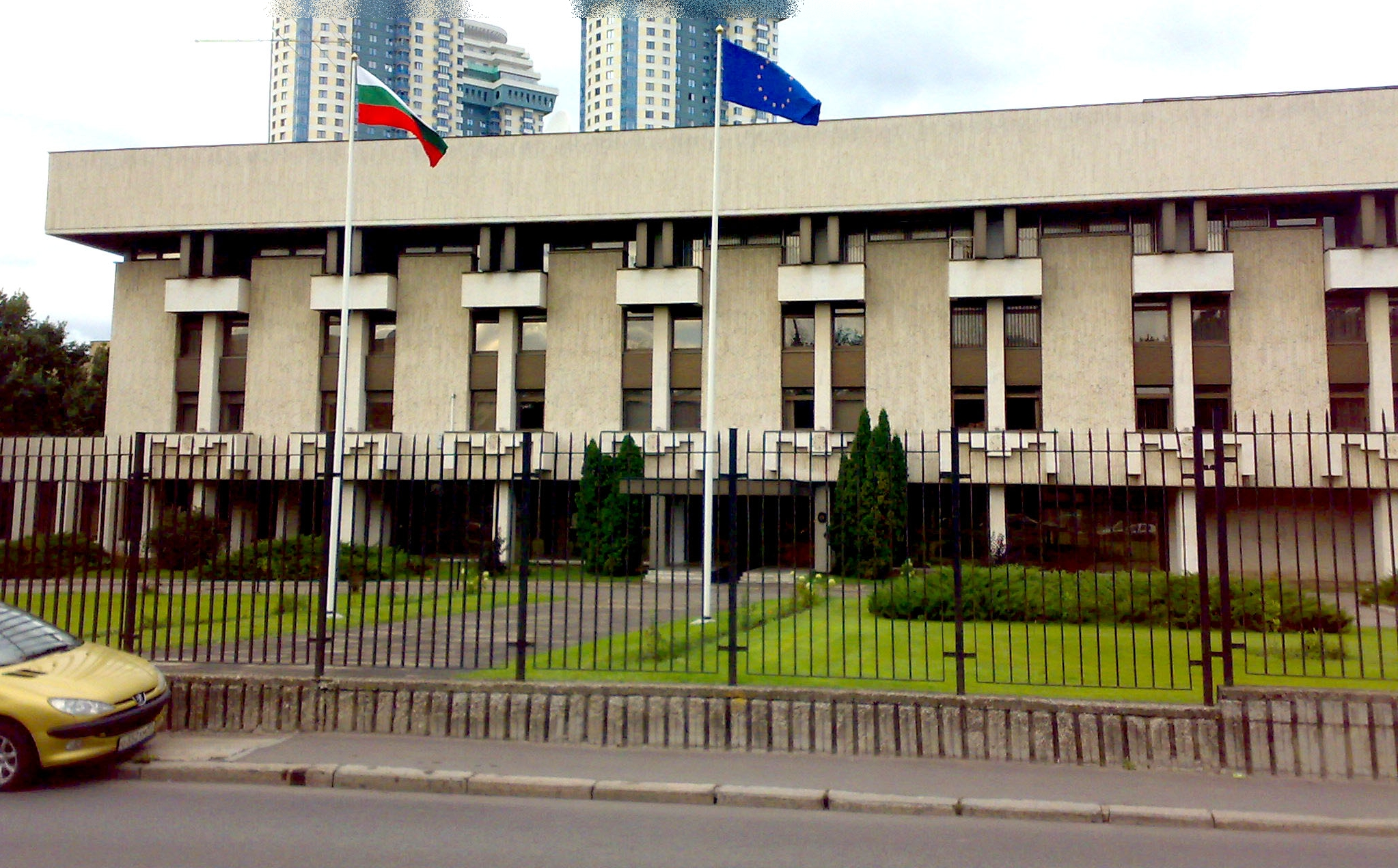
Embassy of Bulgaria in Moscow

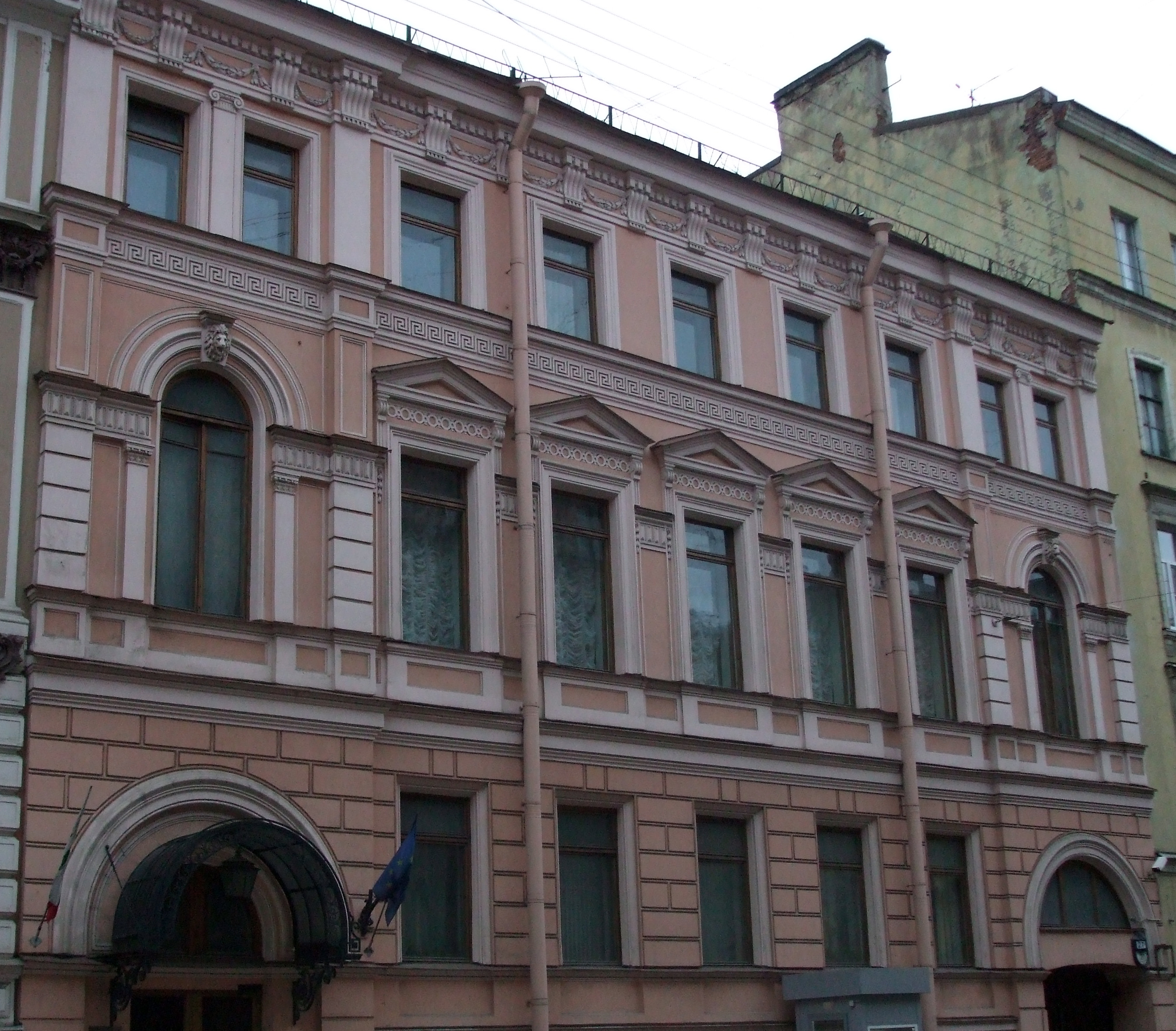
Consulate-General of Bulgaria in Saint Petersburg

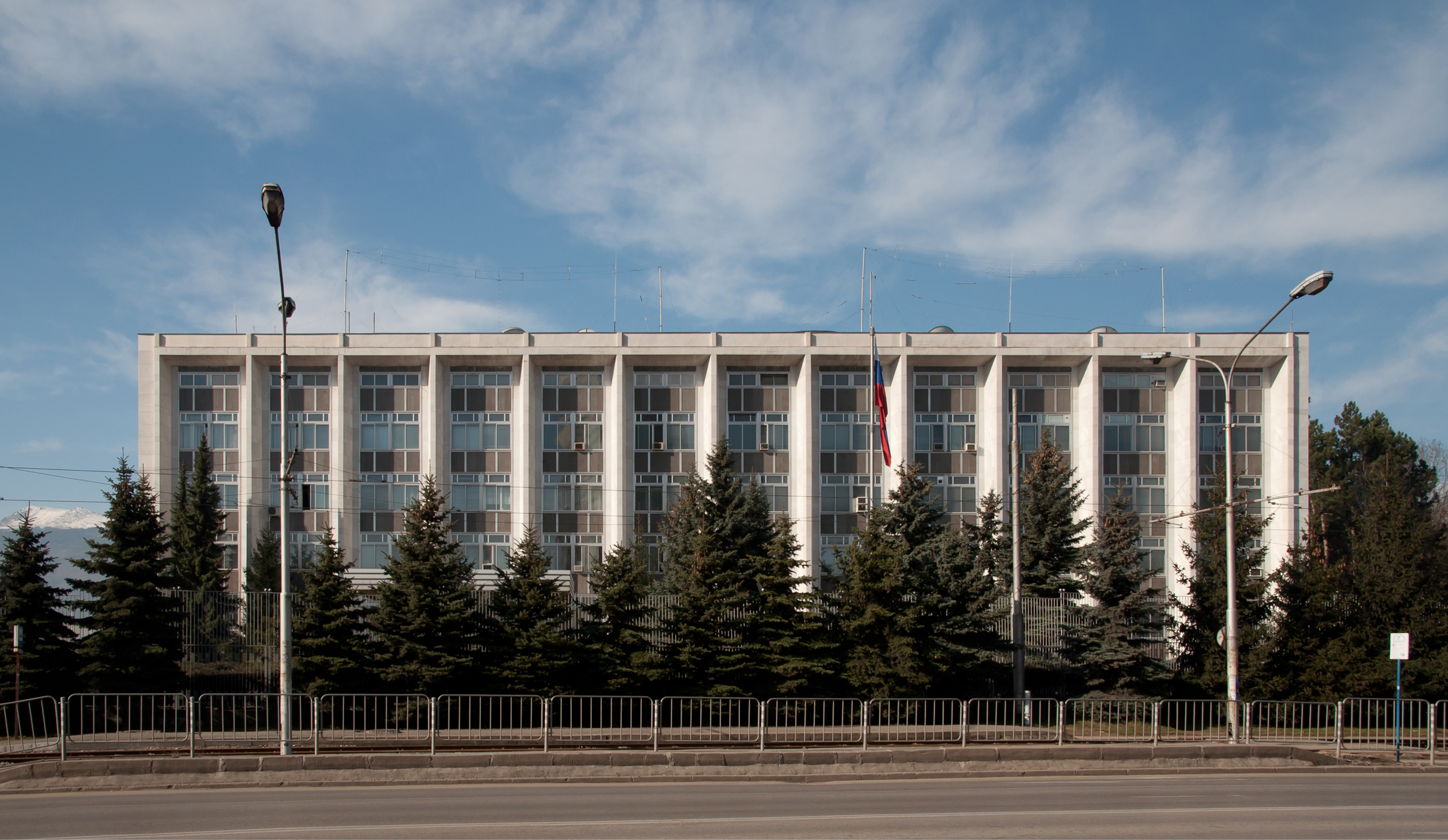
Embassy of Russia in Sofia

== See also ==
- Foreign relations of Bulgaria
- Foreign relations of Russia
- Bulgarians in Russia
- Russians in Bulgaria

== Sources ==
- Arthur Ernst von Huhn: The Struggle of the Bulgarians for National Independence Under Prince Alexander: A Military and Political History of the War Between Bulgaria and Servia in 1885 (John Murray, 1886). Online.
