= Izmail Regional Committee of the Communist Party of Ukraine =

The Izmail Regional Committee of the Communist Party of Ukraine, commonly referred to as the Izmail CPU obkom, was the position of highest authority in the Izmail Oblast, in the Ukrainian SSR of the Soviet Union. The position was created in July 1940 following the 1940 Soviet occupation of Bessarabia and Northern Bukovina during the ongoing World War II and abolished in 1954 when it was merged with the Odessa Regional Committee.

The First Secretary was a de facto appointed position usually by the Central Committee of the Communist Party of Ukraine or the First Secretary of the Republic.

== List of First Secretaries of the Communist Party of Izmail Oblast ==
| Name | Term of Office | | Life years |
| Name | Start | End | Life years |
First Secretaries of the Oblast Committee of the Communist Party
| Oleksandr Ovchanrenko | July 1940 | August 1940 | |
| Mykhailo Kuznetsov | August 1940 | July 1941 | 1904-???? |
| part of the Kingdom of Romania Governorate of Bessarabia | 1941 | 1944 | |
| Vasyl Horba | 1944 | 1945 | 1904–1978 |
| Stepan Tarasov | 1945 | January 1948 | 1893–1955 |
| Mikhail Maltsev | January 1948 | December 1948 | |
| Kostiantyn Hrushovyi | December 1948 | January 1950 | 1906–1982 |
| Oleksiy Fedorov | January 1950 | May 1952 | 1901–1989 |
| Semyon Novikov | May 1952 | February 1954 | 1908–1978 |

== See also ==
- Izmail Oblast

== Sources ==
- World Statesmen.org
