= Sergey Kavtaradze =

Soviet Union politician and diplomat

- სერგო ქავთარაძე Сергей Кавтарадзе
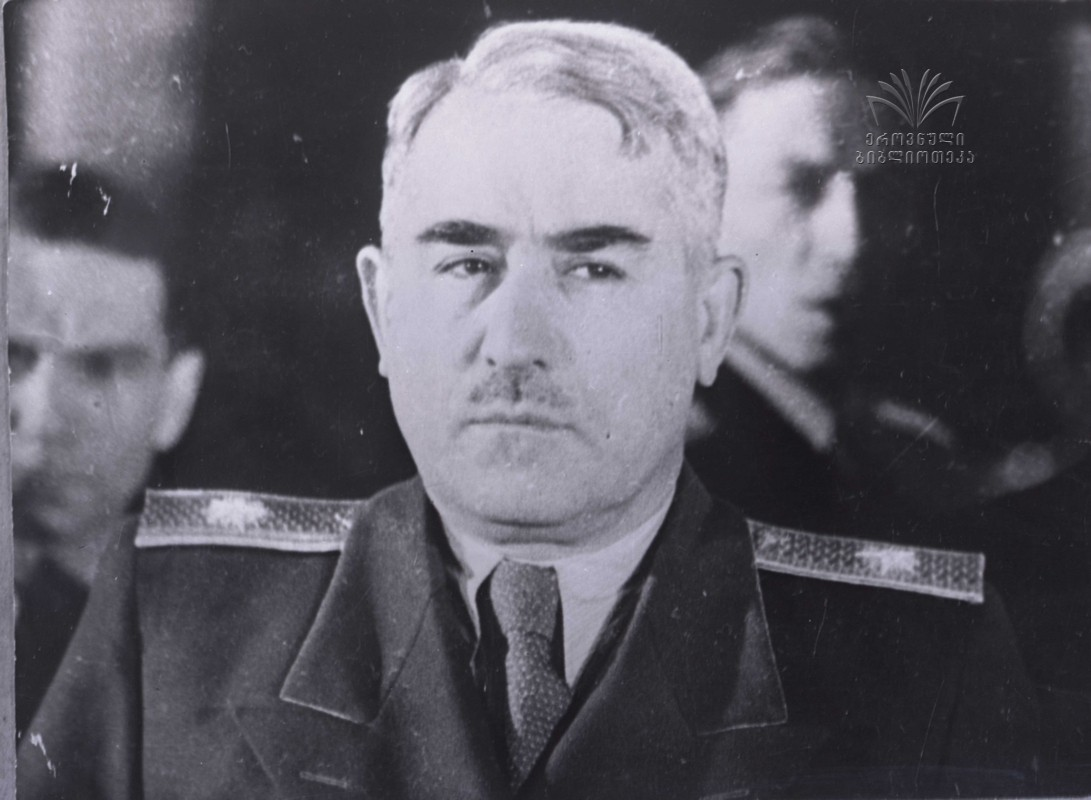

Soviet Ambassador to Romania
- In office August 15, 1945 – July 7, 1952
- Preceded by: Anatoly Lavrentiev
- Succeeded by: Anatoly Lavrentiev

Chairman of the Council of People's Commissars of the Georgian SSR
- In office April 1922 – January 1923
- Premier: Vladimir Lenin
- Preceded by: Polikarp Mdivani
- Succeeded by: Shalva Eliava

Personal details
- Born: 15 August 1885 Zovreti, Kutais Governorate, Imperial Russia
- Died: 17 October 1971 (aged 86) Tbilisi, Georgian SSR, Soviet Union
- Citizenship: Soviet
- Party: Communist Party of the Soviet Union
- Other political affiliations: Georgian Communist Party

Sergey or Sergo Kavtaradze (Georgian: სერგო ქავთარაძე Sergo Kavtaradze; Russian: Сергей Иванович Кавтарадзе Sergey Ivanovich Kavtaradze; 15 August 1885 – 17 October 1971) was a Soviet politician and diplomat who briefly served as head of government in the Georgian SSR and as Deputy Prosecutor General of the Soviet Union. A Georgian Bolshevik activist, he was persecuted for his Trotskyist activities, but was pardoned and reinstated by his personal friend Joseph Stalin.

Arrested during the Great Purge, Kavtaradze became famous for being among the few victims to be brought out of jail and readmitted in the Soviet Communist Party hierarchy. He was Deputy to the Foreign Commissar Vyacheslav Molotov for the greater part of World War II, and, in 1944, was sent to Iran, where his controversial stance helped topple the Mohammad Sa'ed cabinet. Kavtaradze was also involved in provoking rebellion in the Iranian Azerbaijan and other Iranian-ruled areas.

His last major office was that of Ambassador to Romania, where he maintained close contacts with the Romanian Communist Party faction formed around Ana Pauker and played a part in facilitating electoral fraud during the general election of 1946.

== Biography ==
=== Early activities ===
Kavtaradze was born into a noble family in Zovreti, in the Georgian area of Imereti, at the time part of the Russian Empire. He joined the Russian Social-Democratic Workers' Party in 1903 and engaged in agitation during the period leading up to the October Revolution. Active throughout the Caucasus and in Saint Petersburg, he was a member of the Social Democratic Committee for Imereti and Mingrelia (1904–1906). Kavtaradze first met his fellow Georgian Joseph Stalin early in his youth, and became his collaborator. During this time, he reputedly helped the young Stalin hide from detectives.

Kavtaradze's political activities contrasted with his romantic life: he eventually married Sofia Vachnadze, a Georgian princess whose godmother was Empress Consort Maria Feodorovna (mother of Emperor Nicolas II).< In 1912, he split with the mainstream Social Democrats as one of the Old Bolsheviks, and subsequently stood on the group's far left. He then worked for the Bolshevik paper Pravda (1912–1914), and, in 1915, graduated from the Saint Petersburg University Faculty of Law. After the February Revolution of 1917, he was present on the Social Democratic (Bolshevik) Regional Committee in the Caucasus, while editing the group's local journal, Kavkazsky Rabochy. Later in the year, he was a delegate to the 6th Party Congress, and, in 1918, was chairman of the executive committee of the Soviet in Vladikavkaz. As the Civil War took hold of the Caucasus, Kavtaradze remained a representative of the Bolsheviks, active against the Menshevik government in the Democratic Republic of Georgia, and was arrested several times.

Although he frequently disagreed with Stalin, the two remained close. Following the Red Army invasion of Georgia, Kavtaradze was head of the revolutionary committees in Batumi and Adjaria (March–September and July–September 1921, or up until May 1921). He later filled the same post in the Georgian SSR (at the time part of the Transcaucasian SFSR), where he was also People's Commissar for Justice. Between February 1922 and 1923, he was head of government (Chairman of the Sovnarkom) of the Georgian SSR. He was counselor of the Soviet Embassy in Turkey (1923–1924), and later served as Deputy Prosecutor General of the Soviet Union (1924–1928).

=== Left Opposition and first arrest ===
Around that time, Kavtaradze joined Leon Trotsky and the Left Opposition in their conflict with Stalin and other Party leaders, and ceased his involvement with the group only as it collapsed. This caused him to be expelled from the Party as early as 1927. Eventually, in late 1927, he was sent on internal exile to Orenburg Oblast (or, according to others, to Kazan). He attempted to visit Moscow on vacation in December 1928, but was arrested on charges of spreading "Anti-Soviet propaganda".

In 1929, Stalin ordered the State Political Directorate and Lavrentiy Beria to round up the leadership of the Georgian Communist Party, including Polikarp Budu Mdivani and others who had voiced strong criticism of the centralism imposed with the creation of the Soviet Union (see Georgian Affair). Other Georgian comrades of Stalin were also arrested, including Kote Tsintsadze. However, in a speech condemning Mdivani's associates as a "terrorist group", Beria left out Kavtaradze's name, which was seen as a sign that Stalin was going to be more lenient with him. He was nonetheless sentenced to three years in prison, which he served in Tobolsk.

Kavtaradze was eventually released on Stalin's orders, and was allowed to return to and settle in Moscow, where he worked as a journalist without reentering the Party. According to historian Roy Medvedev, Sergey Kavtaradze's liberation came after he sent a letter to the uncontested leader, which included a pledge that "he was not working against the Party." Medvedev places Kavtaradze's release after the 1934 murder of Party boss Sergey Kirov, while other sources indicate that he emerged from prison in 1931.

Central Committee member Lazar Kaganovich was tasked with looking after him. One of Sergey Kavtaradze's journalistic pieces, published soon after his return to Moscow, was a recollection of his early activities, which was reportedly well liked by Stalin.

=== Second arrest and death sentence ===
Kavtaradze consequently worked for a publishing house, reviewing works of fiction. In late 1936, as the Great Purge was reaching its peak, he and his wife Sofia were suddenly arrested on orders from NKVD chief Nikolai Yezhov, accused of "counter-revolutionary activities" and of having conspired with Mdivani to have Stalin assassinated, and sentenced to death. They were both subject to torture in the Lubyanka Prison. Although Mdivani was shot immediately, the couple remained waiting on Death Row for a significant period. Upon being presented with a list of planned executions, Stalin marked a dash in crayon next to Kavtaradze's name—according to various sources, this discreet sign saved Kavtaradze's life.

Sergey Kavtaradze was later moved to a prison in Tbilisi, but brought back to Moscow in February 1939. The couple were suddenly released in late 1939, and were first allowed to see each other in Beria's Moscow apartment. British historian Simon Sebag Montefiore argues that this was a delayed consequence of a letter Stalin received in 1936: in it, the couple's eleven-year-old daughter, Maya, begged for her parents to be allowed to live. The Kavtaradzes (including Maya, who was allowed to leave Tbilisi and transported to Moscow) moved into a hotel, and then allowed to settle in a communal apartment. In what was an unprecedented gesture, Stalin and Beria paid them a visit in their new home.

=== World War II ===
Kavtaradze was assigned to the State Publishing House in 1940, and reinstated in the Party later that year. He became an assistant to Foreign Commissar Vyacheslav Molotov in 1941, being placed in charge of the Near East Department. In 1943, after the Nazi German invasion of the Soviet Union, he was Deputy Foreign Commissar. He took part in the inter-Allied summits—the Yalta Conference and the Potsdam Conference. The family were often guests at the Kremlin, where they attended dinners in the company of Stalin and other prominent politicians.

During September 1944, Sergey Kavtaradze was in Iran, where, three years after the Anglo-Soviet invasion, he was to push for a Soviet share in the local oil industry. He approached Prime Minister Mohammad Sa'ed, asking him to allow Soviet prospectors in northern Iran. Sa'ed, who was by then involved in a conflict with the far left Tudeh and nationalist forces over having allowed British and American businesses the possibility of opening oil field in the country, did not reply favorably to the envoy's request. Kavtaradze then resorted to threats,< which he notably voiced during a meeting with Shah Mohammad Reza Pahlavi. In parallel, the Soviet Red Army troops in Iran made the transit of Iranian forces difficult, and were present during a large-scale Tudeh demonstration in front of the Majlis building.

It was largely as a result of these maneuvers that Sa'ed ultimately resigned on 9 November 1944, being replaced by Morteza Gholi Bayat. In December, despite Tudeh opposition, Mohammed Mosaddeq successfully advanced legislation preventing any government official from granting Iranian fields to any foreign investor without explicit approval from the Majlis. Kavtaradze protested the change, claiming that it was aimed against the Soviet Union, but the Bayet cabinet refused to renegotiate and he returned to Moscow without having registered any gain. In June 1945, Molotov, Kavtaradze and Azerbaijan SSR leader Mir Jafar Baghirov were instructed by the Soviet Central Committee to secretly prepare a separatist insurrection in the Iranian Azerbaijan. This resulted in Ja'far Pishevari's Azerbaijan People's Government, while agitation among the Kurdish people gave way to Qazi Muhammad's Republic of Mahabad (both regimes were crushed within months by Iranian interventions).

During early autumn, together with the Armenian SSR's Foreign Commissariat, Kavtradze analyzed the border issues between Turkey and the Caucasian Soviet Republics (see Tao-Klarjeti, Wilsonian Armenia). In a report to Molotov, he estimated that the Turkish state owed 20,500 km^{2} in territory to the Armenian SSR and 5,500 km^{2} to the Georgian SSR. With his backing, the Armenian leadership unsuccessfully proposed that the Ardahan Province and the area around Oltu be demanded from Turkey and granted to the Armenian SSR. The two regions had been part of the Democratic Republic of Armenia following the 1920 Treaty of Sèvres, but were also claimed by Georgia. In contrast, the Georgian leaders proposed that Ardahan and Oltu become part of their republic.

=== Activities in Romania and final years ===
During the war's final stage, Kavtaradze was sent to the Romanian Kingdom, whose alliance with the Axis powers was ended by the coup of August 1944 (see Romania during World War II). His office as Ambassador, like the Soviet military presence, was instrumental in providing guidance and assistance for the Romanian Communist Party (PCR). He took over his post in 1945, and kept it until 1952.

At the time, he was especially close to the PCR's so-called "Muscovite faction", and to its leader, Ana Pauker. This came at a time when Pauker won the trust of Soviet leaders such as Molotov, Kaganovich and Kliment Voroshilov—in contrast, her main rival, Gheorghe Gheorghiu-Dej, sought support from Georgy Malenkov and Beria. At a lower level, Pauker's relations with Kavtaradze were replicated by the close relationship between Gheorghiu-Dej and Mark Borisovich Mitin, the Cominform activist and Stalinist theorist.

During September 1945, as Soviet specialists on Romanian issues, Kavtaradze and his fellow diplomat, former prosecutor Andrey Vyshinsky, were present in Moscow at a meeting between a Romanian delegation and Stalin. The Romanian side, overseen by Ploughmen's Front leader and Premier Petru Groza, also comprised Foreign Minister and Vice-Premier Gheorghe Tătărescu, Romanian Social Democrat leader Ştefan Voitec, and Mihail Ghelmegeanu. The discussions were centered on Romania's agreement to seal a final armistice with the Soviet Union. The Minister of Justice and prominent PCR member, Lucreţiu Pătrăşcanu, was conspicuously absent from the talks, in what was seen as an early sign of his downfall.

In autumn 1946, Kavtaradze, who regularly instructed Pauker, played a part in the electoral fraud that brought the PCR-created Bloc of Democratic Parties to power under Groza's leadership (see 1946 Romanian general election).

In January 1947, as Romania prepared to sign the Paris Peace Treaty, he played a part in negotiating, with Premier Groza, Foreign Minister Tătărescu, and PCR activist Emil Bodnăraş, the Soviet takeover of islands on the Danube's Chilia branch. While Groza asked for Romania to receive the Hertsa region and a small area north of Siret in exchange, Tătărescu opposed any change in the status quo, and Bodnăraş asked for promises of compensation to be made. Kavtaradze relayed his government's position that no guarantees were to be made, and the islands were ceded to the Soviet Union as part of the Paris Treaty system.

Since the Soviet-dominated Allied Commission ended its mandate (October 1947) and until his recall, Kavtaradze replaced Red Army general Ivan Susaykov as the most important representative of his country in relations with the Groza government, and, later, with Communist Romania. He retired in 1954, one year after Stalin's death, and in 1961, was a delegate to the 22nd Party Congress. He died ten years later in Tbilisi, where his descendants were still residing in 2003.

== Legacy ==
Stalin's forgiveness for Kavtaradze has drawn interest from historians, as did the fact Stalin's attitudes toward his friend remained ambiguous after he was released from prison. In his Let History Judge, Roy Medvedev cites an episode occurring circa 1939, reported to him by Kavtaradze himself: during dinner at the Kremlin, Kavtaradze was addressed by Stalin the words "And yet you wanted to kill me". Medvedev notes: "Some historians may see this comment as proof of Stalin's paranoia. But Stalin knew well that Kavtaradze never tried to kill him. However, he could not admit this openly, for then he would have had to reconsider the execution of Budu Mdivani and many other Communists involved in the case. It was much simpler to 'forgive' Kavtaradze alone." In his view, the case was similar to that of Alyosha Svanidze (the brother of Stalin's first wife Ekaterina Svanidze), who was shot after refusing to confess similar crimes. He concluded: "All these actions reveal a misanthropic tyrant, not a mentally ill person who did not know what he was doing." Reportedly, Sergey Kavtaradze himself believed that the conversation showed Stalin to be "sick". Simon Sebag Montefiore, who places this event right after the Kavtaradzes' liberation, cites the line as: "Nevertheless, you all wanted to kill me?", and gives Kavtaradze's reply to it as "Do you really think so?" He also records an exchange between Stalin and Sofia Kavtaradze: Stalin, looking at her hair (which had turned white in prison), commented "We have tortured you too much."

In this context, Stalin charged Sergey Kavtaradze with editing a Russian-language translation of Shota Rustaveli's The Knight in the Panther's Skin, which he was to complete together with the academic Shalva Nutsibidze. Nutsibidze was himself a former inmate, and he had begun work on the translation in his cell—Stalin had personally reviewed his work and found it impressive, ordering Nutsibidze to be released. Reportedly, the Soviet dictator even corrected part of the manuscript and his personal translation of a section probably made it into the final edition.

Following his release, Stalin kept Kavtaradze in his circle of intimates, and nicknamed him Tozho—in reference to his slant eyes, which, Stalin believed, made him look like the Japanese prime minister Hideki Tōjō. He also confided in him: at some point after the Great Purge, Stalin allegedly told his friend that "we had to shoot" Nikolai Yezhov. On one occasion in 1945, speaking in Georgian, Stalin told the Mingrelian Lavrentiy Beria he considered him a "traitor" in front of Kavtaradze.

According to Gheorghe Gheorghiu-Dej's political ally, Alexandru Bârlădeanu, Kavtaradze was also on good terms with his faction, and, while in Romania, furnished them details on his youth and relations with Stalin and his earlier fall from grace. Bârlădeanu remembered Kavtaradze telling him that he was present at the 17th Party Congress of 1934, where he claimed to have cast his vote in favor of Sergey Kirov and against Stalin's choices for the Central Committee. The ballot was secret, but Stalin later ordered the voting majority to be purged, which would have left Kavtaradze among the very few survivors of that vote.
