= Belgrade declaration =

Declaration of relations between USSR and Yugoslavia

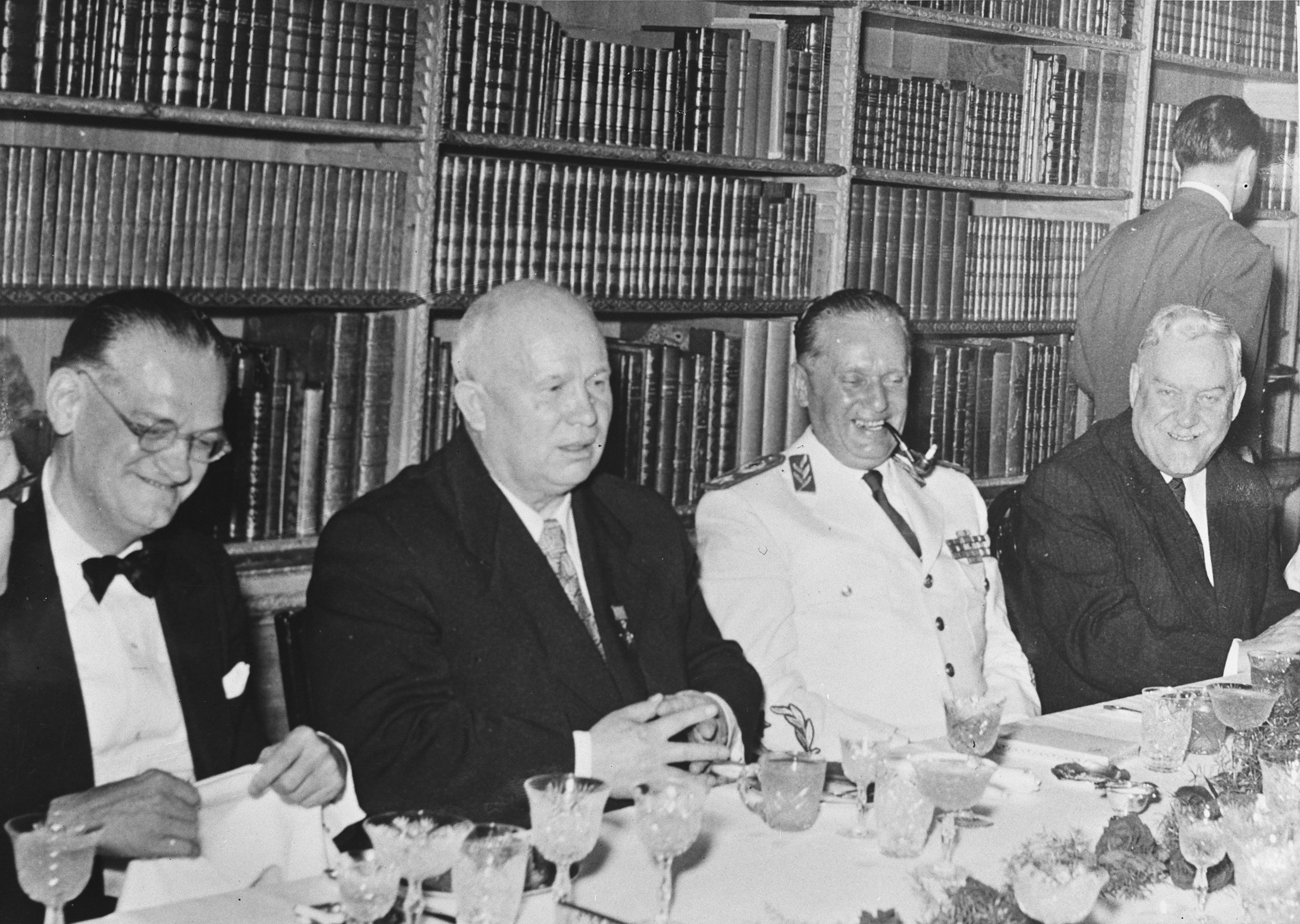
- Nikita Khrushchev, Josip Broz Tito and Nikolai Bulganin in Belgrade, 30 May 1955
- Type: Declaration
- Context: Post-Stalinist normalization of relations between Yugoslavia and the Soviet Union
- Signed: 2 June 1955
- Signatories: Nikita Khrushchev; Josip Broz Tito
- Parties: Soviet Union; Yugoslavia

The Belgrade declaration (Russian: Белградская декларация, Serbo-Croatian: Beogradska deklaracija, Београдска декларација, Slovene: Beograjska deklaracija, Macedonian: Белградска декларација) is a document signed by President of Yugoslavia Josip Broz Tito and Soviet leader Nikita Khrushchev on 2 June 1955 that brought about a short reconciliation between the two states. Negotiations leading up to the signing of the document took place between 27 May and 2 June.

The declaration guaranteed noninterference in Yugoslavia's internal affairs and legitimized the right to interpret other forms of socialist development in different countries. While the declaration failed in achieving lasting rapprochement between the two countries (a result of Yugoslav anxiety over the Hungarian Revolution of 1956) it had an effect on Yugoslav disengagement from the Balkan Pact with the NATO member states of Turkey and Greece. The document was a cornerstone for the relations between the two countries for the following 35 years.

== Background ==
After Stalin's death in 1953, Tito had to choose between a more Western approach to reforms or an agreement with new Soviet leader Nikita Khrushchev. The two countries formally reestablished diplomatic relations with Soviet ambassador Vasily Valkov arriving to Belgrade on 30 July and Yugoslav ambassador Dobrivoje Vidić arriving to Moscow on 30 September 1953 under the leadership of Georgy Malenkov. This, however, did not automatically lead to normalization between the two ruling parties. The Communist Party of the Soviet Union and the League of Communists of Yugoslavia exchanged letters in late 1955.

Tito tried to reconcile with the Soviet Union, inviting Khrushchev to Belgrade in 1955. The Khrushchev trip to Belgrade is sometimes colloquially known as the "Soviet Canossa".

This meeting resulted in the Belgrade declaration ending the Informbiro period, granting other socialist countries the right to interpret Marxism in a different way, and ensured more equal relationships amongst all satellite states and the Soviet Union. But the limits of this agreement became evident after the Soviet intervention in Hungary in October 1956; this was followed by a new Soviet campaign against Tito, which held the Yugoslav government responsible for the Hungarian insurrection. Soviet–Yugoslav relationships went through similar cool periods in the 1960s (after the violent ending of the Prague Spring and the subsequent Warsaw Pact invasion of Czechoslovakia) and thereafter. Yugoslavia, however, became an associated member of the Comecon in 1964 after an agreement was reached with the Soviet leadership.
