= Stepan Chervonenko =

Russian diplomat

- Степан Червоненко

Head of the Cadres Abroad Department of the Central Committee
- In office July 1959 – 30 September 1988
- Preceded by: Nikolai Pegov
- Succeeded by: Post abolished

Ambassador of the Soviet Union to France
- In office 3 May 1973 – 20 January 1983
- Preceded by: Pyotr Abrasimov
- Succeeded by: Yuli Vorontsov

Ambassador of the Soviet Union to Czechoslovakia
- In office 13 April 1965 – 27 April 1973
- Preceded by: Mikhail Zimyanin
- Succeeded by: Vladimir Matskevich

Ambassador of the Soviet Union to China
- In office 15 October 1959 – 13 April 1965
- Preceded by: Pavel Yudin
- Succeeded by: Sergey Lapin

Full member of the 22nd, 23rd, 24th, 25th, 26th, 27th Central Committee
- In office 31 October 1961 – 25 April 1989

Personal details
- Born: 3 September 1915 Okip, Poltava Oblast, Russian Empire
- Died: 11 July 2003 (aged 87) Moscow, Russian Federation
- Party: Communist Party of the Soviet Union
- Profession: Diplomat, civil servant
- Awards: Honored Employee of the Diplomatic Service of the Russian Federation

Stepan Vasilievich Chervonenko (Russian: Степан Васильевич Червоненко; Ukrainian: Степан Васильович Червоненко, Czech: Stěpan Vasiljevič Červoněnko; 16 September [O.S. 3 September] 1915, Okip, Poltava Oblast, Russian Empire – 11 July 2003, Moscow, Russian Federation) was a Soviet diplomat. From 1959 to 1965, he was ambassador to China.

== Career ==
Whilst serving as the ambassador to Peking in 1961, Chervonenko was present during the breakup of Sino-Soviet Relations. In a meeting with the Vice Premier Chen Yi, Chervonenko was told that Moscow should stop "severing the friendship between the two countries." Chervonenko also served in Czechoslovakia in 1968 (in office from 1965 until 1973, preceded by Mikhail Zimyanin, succeeded by Vladimir Matskevich).

Chervonenko is known for his role in suppressing the Prague Spring of 1968. In 1973 he was appointed Soviet Ambassador to France, a post which he retained until 1983. He was subsequently appointed head of the Cadres Abroad department of the CPSU Central Committee. Spouse Lyudmila Chikolini (1917–2002) was a historian.
