= Alexei Yepishev =

Soviet Army general, politician and diplomat

- Алексей Епишев
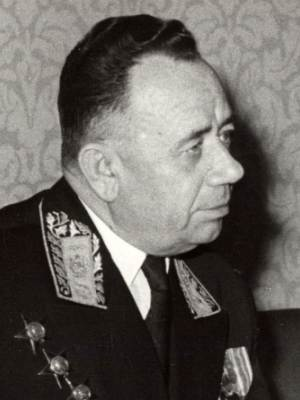
- Yepishev in 1961

Ambassador of the Soviet Union to the Socialist Federal Republic of Yugoslavia
- In office 27 November 1960 – 30 June 1962
- Preceded by: Ivan Zamchevsky
- Succeeded by: Alexander Puzanov

Ambassador of the Soviet Union to the People's Republic of Romania
- In office 14 August 1955 – 27 November 1960
- Preceded by: Leonid Melnikov
- Succeeded by: Ivan Zhegalin

Deputy Minister of State Security for Personnel Matters
- In office 26 August 1951 – 11 March 1953
- Preceded by: Serafim Estafeev
- Succeeded by: Pyotr Kondakov

First Secretary of the Odessa Regional Committee of the Communist Party of Ukraine
- In office 9 January 1950 – 25 August 1951
- Preceded by: Alexei Kirichenko
- Succeeded by: Vasily Markov
- In office March 1953 – 13 August 1955
- Preceded by: Vasily Markov
- Succeeded by: Leontii Naydek

Personal details
- Born: 19 May 1908 Astrakhan, Russian Empire
- Died: 15 September 1985 (aged 77) Moscow, Russian SFSR, Soviet Union
- Party: Communist Party of the Soviet Union (1929–1985)
- Awards: Hero of Soviet Union; Order of Lenin (3); Order of the October Revolution; Order of the Red Banner (4); Order of Bogdan Khmelnitsky, 1st class Order of the Red Banner of Labor; Order of the Patriotic War, 1st Class (2); Order of the Red Star (3); Order for Service to the Homeland in the Armed Forces of the USSR, 3rd class Order of Sükhbaatar (2); Order of the White Lion (1)

Military service
- Allegiance: Soviet Union
- Branch/service: Red Army
- Years of service: 1930–1938; 1943–1946; 1962–1985
- Rank: Army General
- Commands: Main Political Directorate of the Soviet Army and Navy
- Battles/wars: World War II

Alexei Alexeyevich Yepishev (Russian: Алексей Алексеевич Епишев; 19 May [O.S. 6 May] 1908 – 15 September 1985) was a Soviet Army General, politician, and diplomat. He served as the Chief of the Main Political Directorate of the Soviet Army and Soviet Navy from 1962 to 1985.

== Biography ==
=== Early years ===
Yepishev was born to a laborer's family in Astrakhan. In 1923, he began working in a local fishery, where he joined the Komsomol; in 1927, he became the secretary of the fishery's branch of the organization and later, an instructor in the municipal branch. In 1929, he was accepted as a member of the All-Union Communist Party (Bolsheviks), where he became an ardent supporter of Joseph Stalin.

In 1930, Yepishev joined the Red Army, where he underwent commanders' training in the following year and served as a political officer in the Tank Corps. In 1938, he graduated from the Joseph Stalin Military Academy for Mechanization and Motorization. In June that year he was sent as a political organizer to the Comintern Locomotive Factory in Kharkiv, where he was responsible for the Party branch of the workers in the T-34 tanks' production line. There, he also joined the Communist Party of the Ukrainian SSR, in which he remained a member until 1952. In March 1940 he was appointed first secretary of the Kharkiv regional Party committee. From May 1940 until January 1949 he was a member of the Organization Committee of the Ukrainian Communist Party's Presidium.

=== World War II ===
After the beginning of German invasion in June 1941, Yepishev became responsible for directing the war effort in the region: he mobilized the Kharkiv people's militia, of which he was the commissar, and organized partisan formations. In October 1941, shortly before the city's fall to the enemy, he was evacuated to the Urals, where he was appointed first secretary of the Party committee in Nizhny Tagil, and as such was responsible for the rebuilding of the arms factories transferred from the front line areas. In November 1942, he became the CPSU Central Committee's commissioner for personnel matters. On 22 December 1942 he was also appointed Deputy People's Commissar for medium machine building. During the Battle of Stalingrad, he was briefly stationed in the Stalingrad Front's military council. In February 1943, he was removed of all his posts and re-instated as the Kharkiv party chief, as the Red Army seemed to recapture the area. On 26 May, Yepishev was given the rank of a major general and posted as member of the military council, the highest political officer, in General Kirill Moskalenko 40th Army. As such, he participated in the Battle of Kursk and the Lower Dnieper Offensive. On 2 November, he received the same position in the 38th Army, again under Moskalenko, and held it until the end of the Second World War. The 38th took part in the Battle of Kiev, the Dnieper–Carpathian offensive, the Lvov–Sandomierz offensive, the Battle of the Dukla Pass and the Prague offensive.

=== Post-war career ===
On 11 May 1945, shortly after the German capitulation, Yepishev moved back to his former office in the 40th Army, which he held until August 1946. He then left the Armed Forces and was appointed the Ukrainian Communist Party's secretary for personnel matters. From 9 January 1950 until August 1951, he headed the Odessa Oblast's Party committee. He was a deputy in the 3rd and 4th convocations of the Supreme Soviet of the Soviet Union, between 12 March 1950 to 14 March 1958.

On 26 August 1951, Yepishev was posted as Deputy Minister for personnel matters in the Ministry of State Security. Yepishev was one of many officials with no prior experience in intelligence who were transferred to the MGB after it was purged of members associated with its executed former chief, Viktor Abakumov. The head of the MGB in this period, Semyon Ignatyev seems to have been an ineffectual figure, implying that Yepishev may have been the effective chief of police during the time of the Doctors' plot, the Night of the Murdered Poets, the Slánský trial, and other notorious abuses of power - but like Ignatiev, and unlike other involved, such as Mikhail Ryumin, he was never called to account for whatever role he had in those affairs.

On 11 March 1953, shortly after Stalin's death, when Lavrentiy Beria resumed control of the MGB, Yepishev was returned to his post in Odessa, where he remained until August 1955. On 26 March 1954, he was accepted as a member of the Ukrainian Communist Party's Central Committee.

From 14 August 1955 until 27 November 1960, Yepishev was the Soviet ambassador to the People's Republic of Romania. This posting suggests that the new head of the communist party, Nikita Khrushchev, did not trust him, and wanted him away from the centre of power, despite their common background in Ukrainian politics. He left this office to immediately become ambassador in the Socialist Federal Republic of Yugoslavia in the years 1961–1962. He was also a deputy of the 6th to 11th convocations of the Supreme Soviet of the USSR, from 18 March 1962 until his death.

On 11 May 1962, Yepishev was promoted to the rank of Army General and appointed Chief of the Main Political Directorate of the Soviet Army and Navy, effectively the Armed Forces' political supervisor. The reason for his sudden promotion is assumed to have been a conflict between the communist party leadership and senior army officers, including Yepishev's predecessor, Filipp Golikov, and his war time colleague Marshal Moskalenko, who opposed Khrushchev's rash decision to ship nuclear missiles to Cuba. The appointment of a party official with only a limited military background was a way of re-establishing party control over the armed forces. He held the post for 23 years. When Khrushchev was toppled from power and removed from the Central Committee of the CPSU on 16 November 1964, Yepishev, who had been a candidate member since 1952, was promoted to fill the vacancy.

In 1968, during the Prague Spring, when the Czechoslovak communist party under Alexander Dubček was attempting to combine state control of industry with free speech and the abolition of censorship, Yepishev was the first high-ranking official to hint publicly, in May 1968, that the USSR might use military force to suppress the experiment. On 15–18 August, he accompanied the Minister for Defence, Marshal Andrei Grechko on an inspection tour of the Red Army units who invaded Czechoslovakia days later, on 21 August.

In spring 1979, Yepishev led a military delegation to Kabul, just before the Soviet Army invaded Afghanistan on 24 December 1979, setting off a war that lasted ten years.

In July 1985, Yepishev was the first high ranking Soviet communist official to be removed from office after the reformer Mikhail Gorbachev took control of the communist party. He went into semi-retirement with the title of inspector in the Ministry of Defense, but died shortly after.

=== In literature ===
Yepishev's role as an MGB general is part of the plot of Robert Harris's thriller Archangel, in which he is described as "a big bastard" with a square jaw, thick brow and grim face set above a boxer's neck, and it is suggested that as an army officer "he never shot anyone, except on his own side."

Military offices
Preceded by Filipp Golikov	Chief of the Main Political Directorate of the Soviet Army and Navy; 11 May 1962-17 July 1985	Succeeded by Aleksey Lizichev
