= Nikolai Organov =

Soviet politician (1901–1982)

- Николай Органов

Chairman of the Presidium of the Supreme Soviet of the Russian SFSR
- In office 26 November 1959 – 20 December 1962
- Premier: Dmitry Polyansky; Gennady Voronov
- Preceded by: Nikolai Ignatov
- Succeeded by: Nikolai Ignatov

Personal details
- Born: Nikolai Nikolayevich Organov; 14 February 1901 Zaraysk, Ryazan Governorate, Russian Empire
- Died: 5 May 1982 (aged 81) Moscow, Russian SFSR, Soviet Union
- Resting place: Troyekurovskoye Cemetery
- Citizenship: Soviet
- Party: CPSU (1925–1982)

Military service
- Allegiance: Russian SFSR
- Branch/service: Red Army
- Years of service: 1919–1923
- Battles/wars: Russian Civil War

Nikolai Nikolayevich Organov (Russian: Никола́й Никола́евич Орга́нов, romanized: Nikoláy Nikoláevich Orgánov; 27 February [O.S. 14 February] 1901 – 5 May 1982) was a Soviet politician and statesman, Chairman of the Presidium of the Supreme Soviet of the RSFSR (1959–62). Member of the Bureau of the Central Committee of the CPSU for the RSFSR (1961–1962). He was a member of the special NKVD troika of the USSR.

== Biography ==
Born into a working-class family. Since 1916, a telegraph line repair worker. In 1919-1923 served in the Red Army.

From 1924 secretary of the county committee of the Komsomol. He joined the Russian Communist Party(b) in 1925. Then he held the positions of chairman of the city executive committee, secretary of the district committee, head of the department of the regional committee, regional committee.

1934-1937 1st Secretary of the Nekouzsky District Committee of the All-Union Communist Party of Bolsheviks (Ivanovo Industrial - Yaroslavl Region). In 1937, Acting 2nd Secretary of the Yaroslavl Regional Committee. This period was marked by joining the special troika, created by order of the NKVD of the USSR dated July 30, 1937 No. 00447, and active participation in the Stalinist repressions.

Since 1943, secretary of the Primorsky Regional Committee of the All-Union Communist Party of Bolsheviks. In 1948 he graduated from the Higher Party School under the Central Committee of the All-Union Communist Party of Bolsheviks (in absentia). In 1947-1952 1st Secretary of the Primorsky Regional Committee of the All-Union Communist Party of Bolsheviks. In 1952-1958 1st Secretary of the Krasnoyarsk Regional Committee of the CPSU (b) - CPSU. In 1958-1959 Deputy Chairman of the Council of Ministers of the RSFSR. In 1959-1962 Chairman of the Presidium of the Supreme Soviet of the RSFSR (elected on November 26, 1959, at the second session of the Supreme Soviet of the RSFSR of the 5th convocation). He was a member of the Bureau of the Central Committee of the CPSU for the RSFSR (October 31, 1961 - November 23, 1962).

In 1963-1967 he was Ambassador Extraordinary and Plenipotentiary of the USSR to Bulgaria. Since 1967, head of the department of the Central Committee of the CPSU. In 1967-1973 Chairman of the commission for travel abroad under the Central Committee of the CPSU.

Deputy of the Supreme Soviet of the Soviet Union of the III-VIII convocations (1950–1970).

Retired since 1973. He died on 5 May 1982 in Moscow, and was buried in the Troyekurovskoye Cemetery.

== Awards ==
- Medal "For Labour Valour"
- Three Orders of Lenin
- Order of the October Revolution
- Order of the Patriotic War, 1st class
- Order of the Red Banner of Labour
