= List of ambassadors of Russia to Romania =

Ambassador of the Russian Federation to Romania
- Emblem of the Russian Foreign Ministry
- Incumbent; Vladimir Lipayev since 20 June 2024
- Ministry of Foreign Affairs; Embassy of Russia in Bucharest
- Style: His Excellency; The Honourable
- Reports to: Minister of Foreign Affairs
- Seat: Bucharest
- Appointer: President of Russia
- Term length: At the pleasure of the president
- Website: Embassy of Russia in Romania

The ambassador of Russia to Romania is the official representative of the president and the government of the Russian Federation to the president and the government of Romania.

The ambassador and his staff work at large in the Russian embassy in Bucharest. There is a consulate general in Constanța. The current Russian ambassador to Romania is Vladimir Lipayev since June 2024.

== History of diplomatic relations ==
Diplomatic relations between the regions that now constitute Romania and the Russian Federation date back to the medieval period. The Tsardom of Russia offered support for the Danubian Principalities during their struggle for independence from the Ottoman Empire. Moldavian ruler Stephen the Great concluded a military-political alliance with Russia in the fifteenth century, sealed by the marriage of his daughter Elena to Ivan the Young, the son and heir of Ivan III. Wallachian ruler Michael the Brave also advocated an alliance with Russia towards the end of the sixteenth century. Relations continued to be strengthened after the establishment of the Russian Empire, with the 1711 Treaty of Lutsk between Peter the Great and Moldovan leader Dimitrie Cantemir; and the establishment of permanent diplomatic relations between Wallachia and Russia during the 1688-1714 reign of Constantin Brâncoveanu.

In the nineteenth century, following the 1828-1829 Russo-Turkish War, Russia established a protectorate over the Danube principalities, with Count Pavel Kiselyov serving as plenipotentiary representative of the councils of Moldova and Wallachia between 1829 and 1834. Kiselyov oversaw various reforms to public administration, and the adoption of the Regulamentul Organic. Following the 1877–1878 Russo-Turkish War, which included the Romanian War of Independence and the defeat and expulsion of the Ottoman Empire, Russia recognised Romanian independence, and on 15 October 1878, Baron Dmitry Stuart presented his credentials to the Romanian prince, and later king, Carol I. 15 October 1878 is now considered the official date for the establishment of Russian-Romanian diplomatic relations.

Diplomatic relations continued into the twentieth century, interrupted by the October Revolution in 1917. The Soviet Union and Romania maintained a bilateral dialogue, with Maxim Litvinov of the Soviet Union and Nicolae Titulescu of Romania co-operating on the signing of the 1933 London Convention on the Definition of Aggression. This was followed with the re-establishment of diplomatic relations on 9 June 1934. Relations were once more suspended on 22 June 1941 after the Axis invasion of the Soviet Union, and remained so during most of the Second World War. They were re-established on 6 August 1945, after the defeat of the Axis powers, and between 20 and 24 August the mission was upgraded to the level of an embassy. During the Cold War Romania was a member of the Warsaw Pact, and with the dissolution of the Soviet Union at the end of 1991, the Russian Federation emerged as the Soviet Union's legal successor. The incumbent ambassador of the Soviet Union to Romania, Feliks Bogdanov, continued as representative of Russia until 1992.

== List of representatives (1878–present) ==
=== Russian Empire to Romania (1878–1917) ===
| Name | Title | Appointment | Termination | Notes |
|---|---|---|---|---|
| Baron Dmitry Stuart | Minister resident | 15 October 1878 | 31 January 1879 | |
| Aleksandr Yakobson | Head of mission | 20 February 1879 | 3 January 1881 | |
| Lev Usurov | Envoy | 2 December 1880 | 3 June 1886 | |
| Mikhail Khitrovo | Envoy | 3 June 1886 | 9 April 1891 | |
| Nikolai Fonton | Envoy | 9 April 1891 | 23 August 1902 | |
| Mikhail von Giers | Envoy | 1902 | 1912 | |
| Nikolai Shebeko | Envoy | 1912 | 1913 | |
| Stanisav Poklevsky-Kozell | Envoy | 1913 | 1916 | |
| Aleksandr Mosolov | Envoy | 1916 | 3 March 1917 | |

=== Soviet Union to Romania (1934–1991) ===
| Name | Title | Appointment | Termination | Notes |
|---|---|---|---|---|
| Mikhail Ostrovsky | Diplomatic representative | 3 November 1934 | 6 February 1938 | |
| Anatoly Lavrentiev | Diplomatic representative (before 9 May 1941); Envoy (after 9 May 1941) | 14 June 1940 | 22 June 1941 | |
Second World War – Diplomatic relations interrupted (1941–1945)
| Sergey Kavtaradze | Envoy (before August 1945); Ambassador (after August 1945) | 15 August 1945 | 7 July 1952 | |
| Anatoly Lavrentiev | Ambassador | 7 July 1952 | 17 July 1953 | |
| Leonid Melnikov | Ambassador | 28 July 1953 | 7 April 1955 | |
| Alexei Yepishev | Ambassador | 14 August 1955 | 27 November 1960 | |
| Ivan Zhegalin | Ambassador | 27 November 1960 | 15 December 1965 | |
| Aleksandr Basov | Ambassador | 15 December 1965 | 16 March 1971 | |
| Vasily Drozdenko | Ambassador | 16 March 1971 | 30 November 1982 | |
| Yevgeny Tyazhelnikov | Ambassador | 27 December 1982 | 7 June 1990 | |
| Feliks Bogdanov | Ambassador | June 1990 | 25 December 1991 | |

=== Russian Federation to Romania (1991–present) ===
| Name | Title | Appointment | Termination | Notes |
|---|---|---|---|---|
| Feliks Bogdanov | Ambassador | 25 December 1991 | 31 December 1992 | |
| Yevgeny Ostrovenko | Ambassador | 31 December 1992 | 9 October 1997 | |
| Valery Kenyaikin | Ambassador | 9 October 1997 | 21 January 2002 | |
| Aleksandr Tolkach | Ambassador | 21 January 2002 | 28 June 2006 | |
| Aleksandr Churilin | Ambassador | 28 June 2006 | 15 December 2011 | |
| Oleg Malginov | Ambassador | 15 December 2011 | 7 June 2016 | |
| Valery Kuzmin | Ambassador | 7 June 2016 | 12 April 2024 | |
| Vladimir Lipayev | Ambassador | 20 June 2024 | present | |
