= Leonid Melnykov =

Soviet politician (1906–1981)

- Леонід Мельников
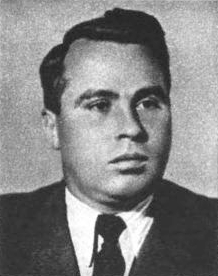
- Melnykov in 1950

Ambassador of the Soviet Union to the People's Republic of Romania
- In office 28 July 1953 – 7 April 1955
- Preceded by: Anatoly Lavrentiev
- Succeeded by: Alexei Yepishev

First Secretary of the Communist Party of Ukraine
- In office 16 December 1949 – 4 June 1953
- Preceded by: Nikita Khrushchev
- Succeeded by: Aleksey Kirichenko

Full member of the 19th Presidium
- In office 16 October 1952 – 6 March 1953

Candidate member of the 19th Presidium
- In office 6 March 1953 – 7 July 1953

Personal details
- Born: 31 May [O.S. 18 May] 1906 Mglinsky Uyezd, Chernihiv Governorate, Russian Empire
- Died: 16 April 1981 (aged 74) Moscow, Soviet Union
- Party: Communist Party of the Soviet Union

Leonid Heorhiyovych Melnykov (Ukrainian: Леонід Георгійович Мельников, Russian: Леонид Георгиевич Мельников, romanized: Leonid Georgiyevich Melnikov; 31 May 1906 – 16 April 1981) was a Soviet and Ukrainian politician and diplomat.

He was born in 1906 in Degtyaryovka, now in Bryansk Oblast, Russia. Starting from 1940, Melnikov worked as a party official in the Donbas, and in 1945 was promoted to the post of First Secretary of Stalino Regional Committee of the Communist Party of Ukraine. In 1947 he became Second, and in 1949 First Secretary of the Central Committee of the Communist Party of Ukraine. In 1952 Melnikov spent a short time as member of the Presidium of the Central Committee of the Communist Party of the Soviet Union.

In June 1953 Melnikov was removed from the post of First Secretary due to "mistakes" in nationality policy, including Russification of schools in Western Ukraine and deficient cadre policies. Between 1953 and 1955 he served as Soviet ambassador in Romania, and was later transferred to various management positions in Kazakh SSR. Leonid Melnikov died in 1981 in Moscow.

Political offices
Preceded by Post established	Chairman of Committee in Supervision for Work Safety; 1966–1981	Succeeded by Ivan Vladychenko
Preceded by Post established	Minister of Construction of the Coal Industry; 1955–1957	Succeeded by Post abolished
Preceded by Anatoliy Lavrentiev	Soviet Ambassador to Romania; 1953–1955	Succeeded by Alexei Yepishev
Party political offices
Preceded by Nikita Khrushchev	1st Secretary of the Communist Party of Ukraine; 1949–1953	Succeeded by Aleksey Kirichenko
Preceded by Mikhail Drozhin	1st Secretary of the Communist Party of Stalino Oblast; 1944–1947	Succeeded by Aleksandr Struyev
Preceded by ?	1st Secretary of the Communist Party of Karaganda Oblast; 1942–1944	Succeeded by Gregory Galaydin
Preceded by Semyon Zadiochenko	1st Secretary of the Communist Party of Stalino Oblast (acting); 1941–1942	Succeeded by German occupation
