= List of ambassadors of the Soviet Union to Czechoslovakia =

Ambassador of the Union of Soviet Socialist Republics to Czechoslovakia
- Emblem of Ministry of Foreign Affairs of the Soviet Union
- Ministry of Foreign Affairs; Embassy of Russia in Prague
- Style: His Excellency
- Residence: Prague

The Ambassador Extraordinary and Plenipotentiary of the Union of Soviet Socialist Republics to Czechoslovakia was the official representative of the General Secretary and the Government of the Soviet Union to the President and the Government of Czechoslovakia.

The position of Soviet ambassador to Czechoslovakia lasted from the first establishment of relations in 1922, until the dissolution of the Soviet Union in 1991. Representation was maintained between the Czechoslovak state and the Soviet Union's successor, the Russian Federation, until the dissolution of Czechoslovakia in 1993. Thereafter the Russian Federation has maintained relations with both successor states, the Czech Republic and Slovakia, and has ambassadors to both.

== History of diplomatic relations ==
Diplomatic exchanges between the Soviet Union and Czechoslovakia began with the formal establishment of relations on 5 June 1922, after the formation of the First Czechoslovak Republic, which had declared its independence from the Austro-Hungarian Empire in 1918. The first Soviet representative, Pavel Mostovenko, was appointed on 9 December 1922. On 9 June 1934 relations were upgraded to the level of missions, with Sergey Aleksandrovsky serving as plenipotentiary from that date. Relations were interrupted on 16 March 1939 with the German occupation of Czechoslovakia.

With the Axis invasion of the Soviet Union in 1941, the USSR entered the Second World War on the side of the Allies. Following the reestablishment of relations on 18 July 1941, Viktor Lebedev was duly accredited to the Czechoslovak government-in-exile in London on 24 October 1943 . Relations were maintained after the war, during which period the Third Czechoslovak Republic and then the Czechoslovak Socialist Republic were formed. With the repudiation of communism, the country officially became the Czech and Slovak Federative Republic in 1990. With the dissolution of the Soviet Union in 1991, a new ambassador, Aleksandr Lebedev, was appointed as representative of the Russian Federation. He continued as ambassador until the dissolution of Czechoslovakia and its separation into the states of the Czech Republic and Slovakia. Lebedev continued to as representative to the Czech Republic until 1996, while a new ambassador, Sergey Yastrzhembsky, was appointed Russian ambassador to Slovakia in June 1993.

== List of representatives (1922– 1993) ==
=== Representatives of the Soviet Union to Czechoslovakia (1922 – 1991) ===
Name	Title	Appointment	Termination	Notes
Pavel Mostovenko	Diplomatic representative	9 December 1922	14 February 1923	
Konstantin Yurenev	Diplomatic representative	14 February 1923	3 March 1924	
Otto Aussem	Diplomatic representative	1924	1924	
Vladimir Antonov-Ovseyenko	Diplomatic representative	23 June 1924	13 December 1928	
Aleksandr Arosev	Diplomatic representative	2 March 1929	4 June 1933	
Sergey Aleksandrovsky	Diplomatic representative Plenipotentiary (after 9 June 1934)	4 June 1933	16 March 1939	
Viktor Lebedev	Ambassador	24 October 1943	6 January 1945	
Valerian Zorin	Ambassador	22 March 1945	7 March 1948	
Mikhail Silin	Ambassador	7 March 1948	26 October 1951	
Anatoly Lavrentiev	Ambassador	26 October 1951	7 July 1952	
Aleksandr Bogomolov	Ambassador	7 July 1952	23 January 1954	
Nikolay Firyubin	Ambassador	23 January 1954	23 August 1955	
Ivan Grishin	Ambassador	11 December 1955	20 February 1960	
Mikhail Zimyanin	Ambassador	20 February 1960	8 April 1965	
Stepan Chervonenko	Ambassador	8 April 1965	27 April 1973	
Vladimir Matskevich	Ambassador	27 April 1973	6 February 1980	
Aleksandr Botvin	Ambassador	6 February 1980	26 April 1984	
Viktor Lomakin	Ambassador	26 April 1984	14 May 1990	
Boris Pankin	Ambassador	14 May 1990	29 August 1991	

=== Representatives of the Russian Federation to Czechoslovakia (1991 – 1993) ===
Name	Title	Appointment	Termination	Notes
Aleksandr Lebedev	Ambassador	25 December 1991	1 January 1993	
