= List of ambassadors of Russia to North Macedonia =

Ambassador of the Russian Federation to the Republic of North Macedonia
- Амбасада на Руската Федерациjа во Северна Македониjа
- Emblem of the Russian Foreign Ministry
- Incumbent; Dmitry Zykov since 25 December 2025
- Ministry of Foreign Affairs; Embassy of Russia in Skopje
- Style: His Excellency; The Honourable
- Reports to: Minister of Foreign Affairs
- Seat: Skopje
- Appointer: President of Russia
- Term length: At the pleasure of the president
- Website: Embassy of Russia in Skopje

The ambassador of Russia to North Macedonia is the official representative of the president and the government of the Russian Federation to the president and the government of North Macedonia.

The ambassador and his staff work at large in the Russian Embassy in Skopje. The post of Russian ambassador to North Macedonia is currently held by Dmitry Zykov, incumbent since 25 December 2025. There is an honorary consulate in Ohrid.

== History of diplomatic relations ==
The Soviet Union maintained diplomatic relations with the Socialist Federal Republic of Yugoslavia throughout the twentieth-century, with ambassadors appointed up until the dissolution of the Soviet Union in 1991, and thereafter with the Russian Federation recognised as its successor state. Yugoslavia had also begun to break up by 1991, with Macedonia voting for independence in 1991. Russia recognised the Republic of Macedonia on 4 August 1992, and official diplomatic relations were established on 31 January 1994. The Russian mission in Skopje was established as an embassy on 6 October 1994. The first Russian ambassador to Macedonia, Pyotr Dobroserdov, was appointed on 25 September 1996. On 22 May 2002, an honorary consulate was opened in Bitola, but permission for it to operate was subsequently revoked by the North Macedonian government on 1 June 2022. In 2019, a long-running dispute over the country's name was settled, and the country became known as North Macedonia.

== Representatives of the Russian Federation to North Macedonia (1996–present) ==
Name	Title	Appointment	Termination	Notes
Pyotr Dobroserdov	Ambassador	25 September 1996	28 April 2000	Credentials presented on 26 December 1996
Vladimir Ivanovsky	Ambassador	21 June 2000	7 February 2002	Credentials presented on 31 July 2000
Agaron Asatur	Ambassador	7 February 2002	8 June 2006	Credentials presented on 14 March 2002
Vladimir Solotsinsky	Ambassador	8 June 2006	17 November 2010	Credentials presented on 29 August 2006
Oleg Shcherbak	Ambassador	17 November 2010	3 August 2018	Credentials presented on 28 January 2011
Sergey Bazdnikin	Ambassador	3 August 2018	9 December 2025	Credentials presented on 18 September 2018
Vladimir Dyakov	Chargé d'affaires	9 December 2025	25 December 2025	
Dmitry Zykov	Ambassador	25 December 2025		
