= Anatoly Lavrentiev =

Soviet diplomat

- Анатолий Лаврентьев
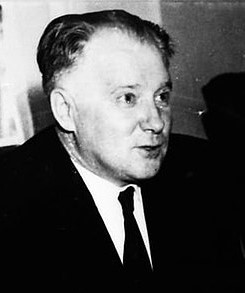
- Lavrentiev in 1953

People's Commissar for Foreign Affairs of the Russian SFSR
- In office 8 March 1944 – 13 March 1946
- Premier: Joseph Stalin
- Preceded by: Georgy Chicherin
- Succeeded by: None—post abolished

Ambassador of the Soviet Union to the Kingdom of Bulgaria
- In office 1939–1940
- Preceded by: Fyodor Raskolnikov
- Succeeded by: Alexander Andreyevich Lavrishev

Ambassador of the Soviet Union to the Kingdom of Romania
- In office 1940–1941
- Preceded by: Mikhail Ostrovsky
- Succeeded by: Sergey Kavtaradze

Ambassador of the Soviet Union to Yugoslavia
- In office 1946–1949

Ambassador of the Soviet Union to Czechoslovakia
- In office 1951–1952
- Preceded by: Mikhail Silin
- Succeeded by: Aleksandr Bogomolov

Ambassador of the Soviet Union to the People's Republic of Romania
- In office 1952–1953
- Preceded by: Sergey Kavtaradze
- Succeeded by: Leonid Melnykov

Ambassador of the Soviet Union to Iran
- In office 1953–1956
- Preceded by: Ivan Sadchikov
- Succeeded by: Nikolai Pegov

Personal details
- Born: 1904 Russian Empire
- Died: 1984 (aged 79–80) Moscow, Russian SFSR, Soviet Union
- Party: Communist Party of the Soviet Union
- Profession: Diplomat, civil servant

Anatoly Iosifovich Lavrentiev (Russian: Анатолий Иосифович Лаврентьев; 1904 – 1984) was a Soviet diplomat. He served as the head of the People's Commissariat for Foreign Affairs of the Russian SFSR in the Soviet government from 8 March 1944 to 13 March 1946. He was a member of the CPSU (b).

== Biography ==
Lavrentiev graduated from the Moscow Power Engineering Institute in 1931 and became a teacher at the Institute.

From 1938 to 1939, he worked as an employee of the apparatus of the People's Commissariat of Heavy Industry of the USSR. In 1939, he was the head of the Eastern European department of the USSR People's Commissariat of Foreign Affairs.

From 1939 to 1940, he was the ambassador of the USSR in Bulgaria. From 1940 to 1941, he served as Plenipotentiary representative of the USSR in Romania and in 1941, he served as the Extraordinary and Plenipotentiary Envoy of the USSR in Romania.

From 1941 to 1943, he served as a responsible officer of the TASS.

In 1943, he served as the Head of the European Department of the USSR People's Commissariat of Foreign Affairs. From 1943 to 1944, he served as Head of the Middle East Department of the USSR People's Commissariat of Foreign Affairs.

From 1944 to 1946, he served as People's Commissar for Foreign Affairs of the Russian SFSR. From 1946 to 1949, he served as Extraordinary and Plenipotentiary Ambassador of the USSR in Yugoslavia.

From 1949 to 1951, he served as Deputy Minister of Foreign Affairs of the USSR.

From 1951 to 1952, he served as Extraordinary and Plenipotentiary Ambassador of the USSR in Czechoslovakia. According to the CIA report, Lavrentiev was "one of the Kremlin's most ruthless and competent foreign affairs officials." From 1952 to 1953, he served as Extraordinary and Plenipotentiary Ambassador of the USSR in Romania.

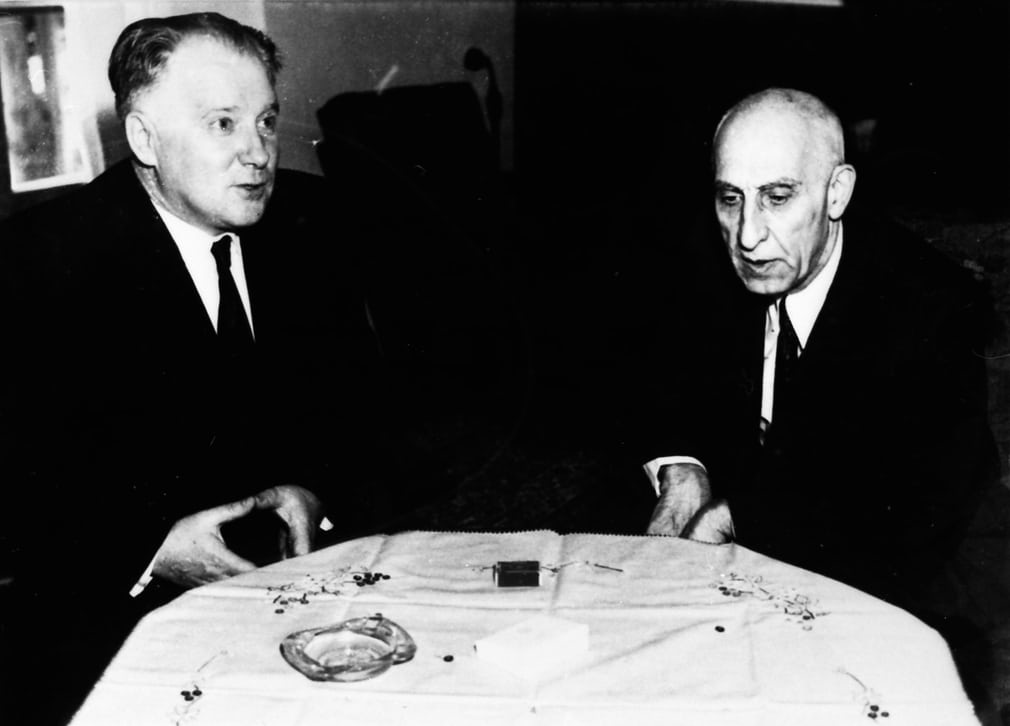
The Russian ambassador, Anatoly Lavrentiev, meets Iran's prime minister, Mohammad Mosaddegh, on 2 August 1953, before the 1953 Iranian coup d'état.

From 1953 to 1956, he served as Extraordinary and Plenipotentiary Ambassador of the USSR in Iran. He met Iran's prime minister, Mohammad Mosaddegh, in 1953 and brought forth the Soviet agenda in Iran. After the fall of Mosaddegh in the 1953 Iranian coup d'état, he tried to commit suicide. He was briefly withdrawn but again reinstalled and returned to his post in Iran. From 1956 to 1970, he served as an employee of the central apparatus of the USSR Ministry of Foreign Affairs.
