= People's Commissariat for Foreign Affairs of the Russian SFSR =

Soviet executive body (1917–23; 1944-46)

The People's Commissariat for Foreign Affairs of the Russian SFSR (Russian: Народный Коммиссариат Иностранных Дел РСФСР: Narodnyi Komissariat Inostrannykh Del – abbreviated to Narkomindel or NKID) was the central executive state body of the Russian Soviet Federative Socialist Republic responsible for conducting the foreign policy and foreign relations of the Soviet state in 1917–1923 and in 1944–1946.

The People's Commissariat for Foreign Affairs was formed by the Decree on the Establishment of the Council of People's Commissars, approved by the 2nd All-Russian Congress of Soviets on November 9, 1917. This was one of the first people's commissariats formed by the Soviet government of Russia. Originally its principle purpose was to print and distribute copies of the secret treaties of the Entente powers which had fallen into the hands of the Bolsheviks. However their original hopes that a traditional diplomatic service would not be needed as workers revolutions spread across Europe and the world proved to be wishful thinking.

When the new Bolshevik government moved the capital from Saint Petersburg to Moscow, Narkomindel was housed in the apartment building of the First Russian Insurance Company, located on the corner of Kuznetsky Most and Bolshaya Lubyanka Street.

== Treaty of Brest-Litovsk ==
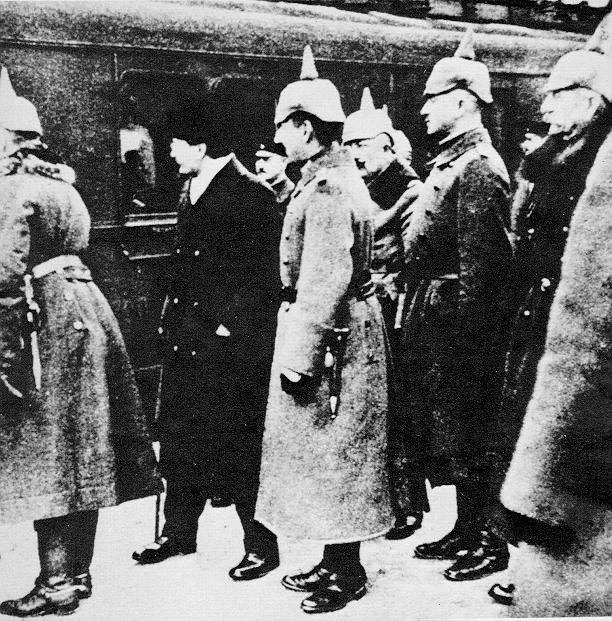
Leon Trotsky being greeted by German officers in Brest-Litovsk

The first Commissar of Foreign Affairs was Leon Trotsky. Upon his appointment he stated that his primary task would be to publish all secret protocols and treaties signed by the previous Russian governments. The first issue that Trotsky had to deal with was the continuing war with the Central powers. Adolph Joffe, a close political ally of Trotsky, signed an armistice on 2 December 1917. He led the Soviet delegation at the Peace negotiations which began at Brest-Litovsk on December 22, 1917. In January 1918 Trotsky arrived at the negotiations with Georgy Vasilievich Chicherin as his deputy. Hopeful of revolution in Western Europe, Trotsky wanted to avoid agreeing to the demands of the central powers to significant annexations. There were differing views amongst the Bolsheviks. Lenin believed that the Soviet Socialist Republic was not capable of waging war. A group around Bukharin advocated revolutionary war and regarded peace with Germany as a betrayal of the German proletariat. Trotsky wanted to delay signing the treaty, in the hope that the prospect of a German offensive would be eliminated by a revolution in Germany.

Originally the Bolsheviks had expected the revolution to spread from Russia to the rest of the world, shaken by the First World War. As these expectations proved unfounded, the Bolsheviks had to engage in diplomatic relations with a hostile world to ensure the survival of the Soviet state. The Soviet diplomats operated under difficult circumstances. The rhetoric of the Bolsheviks was extremely hostile to the capitalist countries. During the first years after the revolution there was a pronounced tendency to take advantage of diplomatic immunity to conduct espionage and to support communist activists in other countries. Only in the early 1920s the need to keep the diplomatic service untainted was given higher priority.

== List of heads of the People's Commissariat ==
No.	Portrait	Name	Term of office	
1		Lev Trotsky	November 8, 1917	March 13, 1918
2		Georgy Chicherin	May 30, 1918	July 6, 1923
3		Anatoly Lavrentiev	March 8, 1944	March 13, 1946

== Bibliography ==
- Annuaire diplomatique du Commissariat de peuple pour les affaires etrangeres/Ежегодник Наркоминдела, Наркоминдел Moscow 1929, 1933, 1934, 1935.
- O. V. Chlevnjuk 1937-ой: Сталин и советское общество, Республика Moscow 1992.
- Viktor Knoll & Lothar Kölm Das Narkomindel im Urteil der Partei. Ein Kaderanalyse aus dem Jahre 1930, pp. 267–314 in Michael G. Müller Berliner Jahrbuch für osteuropäische Geschichte, Akademie Verlag Berlin 1995.
- T. P. Korzhichina & Ju.Ju. Figatner Советская номенклатура: становление, механизмы, действия, pp. 25–38, Вопросы истории 1993:7.
- Teddy J. Uldricks Diplomacy and Ideology - The Origin of Soviet Foreign Relations 1917-1930 Sage Publications London 1979.
