= Nikolay Firyubin =

Soviet diplomat

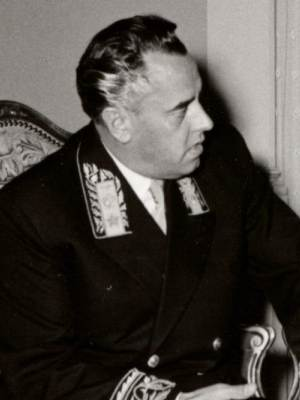
Firyubin in 1955

Nikolay Pavlovich Firyubin (Russian: Николай Павлович Фирюбин; 4 April 1908 – 12 February 1983) was a Soviet diplomat.

== Biography ==
Born in Simbirsk, he became a construction worker at age sixteen. After graduating from the Moscow Aviation Institute in 1935, he went to work in an aircraft factory, and soon became involved in government and party affairs. By 1940 he had become secretary of the Kuntsevo City Committee of Moscow Oblast. During the Second World War, he served as an adviser to the USSR State Defense Committee.

Beginning in 1953, Firyubin filled various diplomatic positions – the Soviet ambassador to Czechoslovakia and to Yugoslavia, the deputy foreign minister of the USSR, and the secretary general of the political advisory committee of the Warsaw Pact states. He served an increasingly public role in Soviet politics, including serving as deputy of the second convocation of the Supreme Soviet of the Soviet Union.

== Personal life ==
Firyubin was notable for his marriage to Ekaterina Furtseva, Soviet Minister of Culture and first female member of the politburo. He died in Moscow in 1983.
