= Aleksey Kirichenko =

Soviet politician (1908–1975)

Alexei Kirichenko
- Олексій Кириченко; Алексей Кириченко
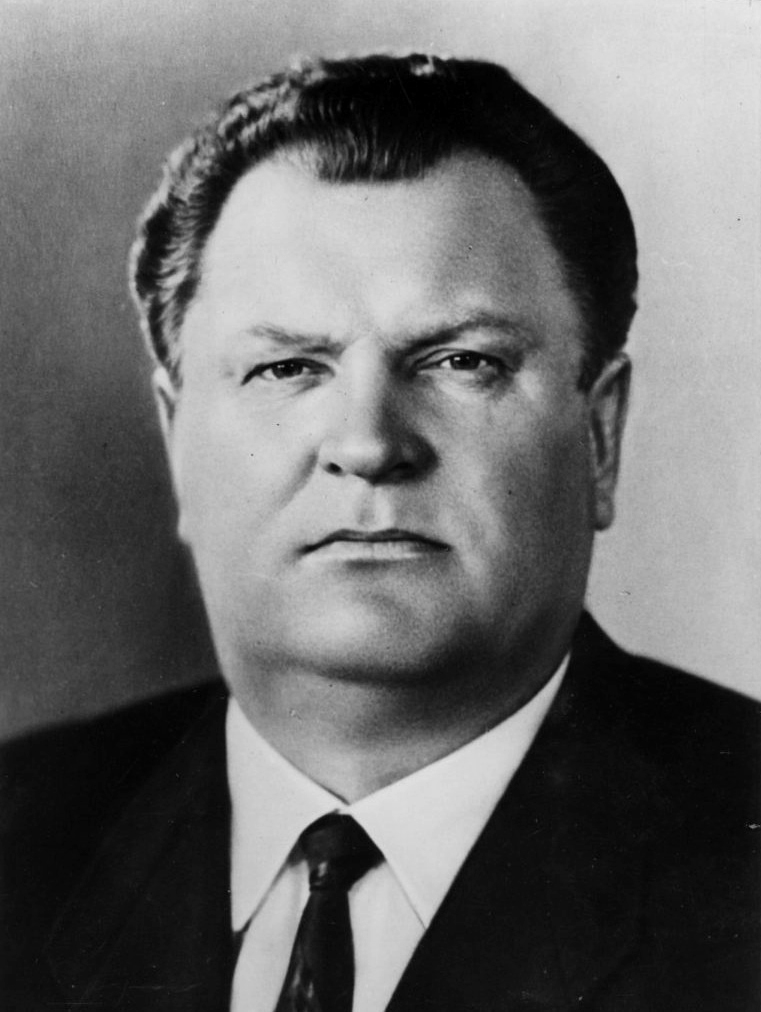
- Official portrait, 1959

Second Secretary of the Communist Party of the Soviet Union
- In office 17 December 1957 – 5 April 1960
- First (Note: First Secretary of the Communist Party of the Soviet Union): Nikita Khrushchev
- Succeeded by: Frol Kozlov

First Secretary of the Communist Party of Ukraine
- In office 12 June 1953 – 26 December 1957
- Preceded by: Leonid Melnikov
- Succeeded by: Nikolai Podgorny

Full member of the 19th, 20th Presidium
- In office 12 July 1955 – 4 May 1960

Member of the 20th Secretariat
- In office 17 December 1957 – 5 April 1960

Personal details
- Born: 26 February 1908 Chornobaivka, Kherson Governorate, Russian Empire (now Ukraine)
- Died: 28 December 1975 (aged 67) Moscow, Soviet Union (now Russia)
- Party: Communist Party of the Soviet Union (1938-1962)
- Profession: Mechanical engineer, civil servant

Alexei Illarionovich Kirichenko (Note: Russian: Алексе́й Илларио́нович Кириче́нко Ukrainian: Олексій Іларіонович Кириченко, romanized: Oleksii Ilarionovych Kyrychenko) (25 February [O.S. 12 February] 1908 – 28 December 1975) was a Soviet Ukrainian politician, who was the first ethnic Ukrainian to head the republic's communist party during the Soviet era. Between 1957 and 1960, he was a Secretary of the Central Committee of the Communist Party of the Soviet Union and the second-highest-ranking official within the party after Nikita Khrushchev.

== Early life and career ==
Kirichenko was born in the village of Chornobaivka in the Kherson region of south-eastern Ukraine, which was then part of the Russian Empire, into a family of Ukrainian factory workers. From the age of 11, he started earning for living by working in the fields and then at railways. After graduating from a mechanical school he worked in Kazakhstan as an engineer in a sovkhoz (state farm). He then returned to Ukraine to receive a university degree and teach agricultural engineering, and graduated in 1936.

== Political career ==
=== Under Stalin ===
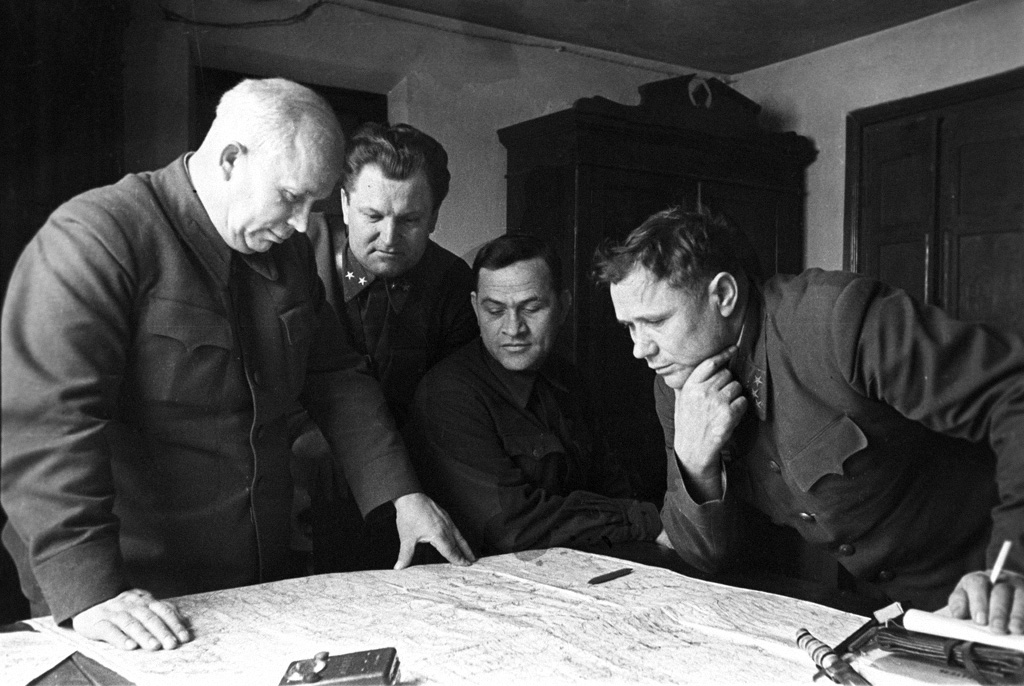
Kirichenko in 1942 (second from left)

In 1938, he became a member of the Central Committee of the Communist Party of Ukraine (CPU), soon after Nikita Khrushchev had been appointed as First Secretary. In 1941, he was appointed Secretary of the CPU during World War II, and served as a member of the military council.

Kirichenko was First Secretary of the Odessa Oblast party committee from 1945 to 1949, coinciding with the Soviet famine of 1946–1947. Ukraine in particular suffered from the effects of the famine, in part due to the devastating effects of World War II on Ukrainian territory. During this period, Kirichenko told Khrushchev that, while visiting the home of kolkhoz (collective farm) workers:

I found a scene of horror. The woman had the corpse of her own child on the table and was cutting it up. She was chattering away as she worked. 'We've already eaten Manechka. Now we'll salt down Vanechka. This will keep us for some time.' Can you imagine? This woman had gone crazy with hunger and butchered her own children!

Kirichenko was a member of the Central Committee of the Communist Party of the Soviet Union from 1952 to 1961, and Second Secretary of the Central Committee of the CPU from 1949 to 1953.

=== Under Khrushchev ===
According to Khrushchev, Kirichenko's promotion to First Secretary the CPU in June 1953 was originally proposed by chief of the NKVD Lavrentiy Beria shortly before his downfall. However, Kirichenko was one of Khrushchev's most influential allies. In July 1955, he was promoted to the 11-member Politburo. In June 1957, he rushed to Moscow at short notice to take part in a Politburo meeting at which Khrushchev's rivals, led by Georgy Malenkov were seeking to remove him from office. However, he ultimately helped Khrushchev turn the tables and oust Malenkov and others.

In December 1957, Kirichenko was transferred to Moscow as the Central Committee Secretary in charge of party appointments. This meant that he was officially ranked as one of the five most senior figures in the party. Because of his office and relative youth, Kirichenko was the person most obviously placed to succeed Khrushchev. Khrushchev mentioned this to the U.S. Ambassador W. Averell Harriman, in June 1959, but added, "I am very jealous of my prerogatives, and while I live, I will run the party." He flew into a rage, banged the desk with his fist and shouted down the phone when Kirichenko tried to transfer a senior official from Moscow to Leningrad without consulting him.

== Downfall, later life, and death ==
On 13 January 1960, it was suddenly announced that Kirichenko had been appointed First Secretary of the Rostov Oblast party committee. In May, he was formally dismissed from the Politburo and the party secretariat. On 15 June 1960, he was sacked from his post in Rostov, after just five months.

He retired in 1962, died in 1975 and was buried at the Novodevichy Cemetery in Moscow.

According to Enver Hoxha, in the midst of the Soviet-Albanian split an Albanian military student studying in the Soviet Union had met Kirichenko during a train ride. The latter said to him, "Good for your Party, which exposed Khrushchev. Long live Enver Hoxha! Long live socialist Albania! ... Don't yield, give Enver my best wishes!"

== Notes ==
Party political offices
Preceded by Nikolai Kiselyov	1st Secretary of the Communist Party of Rostov Oblast; 1960–1960	Succeeded by Aleksandr Basov
Preceded by Mikhail Suslov	Second Secretary of the Communist Party of the Soviet Union; 1957–1960	Succeeded by Frol Kozlov
Preceded by Averky Aristov	Senior Secretary of Cadres of the Communist Party of the Soviet Union; 1957–1960	Succeeded by Frol Kozlov
Preceded by Leonid Melnikov	First Secretary of the Communist Party of Ukraine; 1953–1957	Succeeded by Nikolai Podgorny
Preceded by Anatoliy Kolybanov	1st Secretary of the Communist Party of Odessa Oblast; 1945–1950	Succeeded by Aleksei Yepishev
