= Aleksandr Churilin =

Soviet and Russian diplomat (1946–2021)

- Александр Чурилин
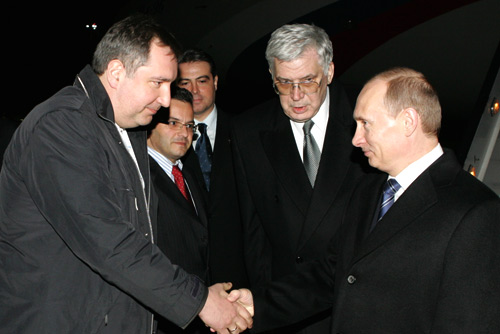
- Churilin (centre) in 2008

Ambassador of Russia to Romania
- In office 28 June 2006 – 15 December 2011
- Preceded by: Aleksandr Tolkach
- Succeeded by: Oleg Malginov

Personal details
- Born: 26 October 1946 Moscow, Russian SFSR, Soviet Union
- Died: 15 April 2021 (aged 74)
- Education: Moscow State Institute of International Relations

Aleksandr Anatolyevich Churilin (Russian: Александр Анатольевич Чурилин; 26 October 1946 – 15 April 2021) was a Soviet and Russian diplomat. He served in various diplomatic roles from 1970 onwards, and was Ambassador of Russia to Romania between 2006 and 2011.

== Career ==
Churilin was born on 26 October 1946 in Moscow, then part of the Russian Soviet Federative Socialist Republic, in the Soviet Union. He studied at Moscow State Institute of International Relations, graduating in 1970, and entering the diplomatic service. In addition to his native Russian, he spoke Swedish and English.

Churilin's early service was spent holding various diplomatic posts in the Soviet, and later the Russian Ministry of Foreign Affairs, and in the department's foreign missions and embassies abroad. His overseas postings included ones to Soviet embassy in Zambia between 1970 and 1974, the US as senior adviser on military-political issues between 1989 and 1995, and Denmark as minister-counselor between 1998 and 2002. Between 1974 and 1987 he was stationed in the central ministry as part of the US and Canada Department. He had been appointed to the diplomatic rank of Envoy Extraordinary and Plenipotentiary Second Class on 25 December 2000, during his time in Denmark.

In February 2003 Churilin became director of the Ministry's Historical and Documentary Department, and then in June 2006 was appointed ambassador of Russia to Romania. He had been promoted to Envoy Extraordinary and Plenipotentiary First Class on 18 April 2005. He held the post of ambassador until his retirement in 2011. He had been promoted to the rank of Ambassador Extraordinary and Plenipotentiary shortly before this, on 13 September 2010. In retirement he continued his connection with the foreign ministry, and since 2018 he was involved in inspection work, repeatedly heading inspections of divisions of the central office, foreign missions and territorial representative offices.

Churilin died on 15 April 2021. His obituary by the Russian Ministry of Foreign Affairs described him as "distinguished by professionalism, diligence, responsible attitude to the assigned work, modesty and responsiveness in relations with colleagues." He was married, with a daughter.
