= Vladimir Lipayev =

Russian ambassador

- Владимир Липаев

Ambassador of Russia to Romania
- Incumbent
- Assumed office 20 June 2024
- Preceded by: Valery Kuzmin

Ambassador of Russia to Estonia
- In office 14 December 2021 – 31 March 2023
- Preceded by: Aleksandr Petrov

Personal details
- Born: Vladimir Georgyevich Lipayev; 6 February 1959 (age 67) Soviet Union

Vladimir Georgyevich Lipayev (Russian: Владимир Георгиевич Липаев; born on 6 February 1959), is a Russian diplomat who has served as the ambassador to Romania since June 2024. He had served as the last ambassador to Estonia from 2021 to 2023.

In January 2023, he was declared persona non-grata by the Estonian government.

He was admitted to the Floreasca Hospital on the New Year’s Eve in 2024 to 2025.

== Biography ==
Lipayev was born on 6 February 1959.

He graduated from the Moscow State Institute of International Relations (MGIMO) of the USSR Ministry of Foreign Affairs in 1981. He has been in diplomatic work since 1981. He can speaks German, English and French.

From 1997 to 2001, he was an adviser at the Russian Embassy in Norway.

From 2004 to 2007, he was deputy director of the personnel department of the Russian Foreign Ministry.

From 2007 to 2011, he was Consul General of Russia in Frankfurt am Main in Germany.

From 2011 to 2021, he was deputy director of the personnel department of the Russian Foreign Ministry.

On 14 December 2021, Lipayev became the ambassador to Estonia.

On 23 January 2023, Lipayev's expulsion from Estonia until February 7 was announced in response to Russia's expulsion of the Estonian ambassador to Russia, Margus Laidre.

On 31 March, Lipayev left office as ambassador.

From 16 April 2024, Lipayev became the ambassador to Romania.
