= List of ambassadors of Russia to Yugoslavia =

Ambassador of the Russian Federation to Yugoslavia
- Emblem of the Russian Foreign Ministry
- Ministry of Foreign Affairs; Embassy of Russia in Belgrade
- Style: His Excellency
- Reports to: Minister of Foreign Affairs
- Seat: Belgrade
- Appointer: President of Russia
- Term length: At the pleasure of the president

The ambassador extraordinary and plenipotentiary of the Russian Federation to Yugoslavia was the official representative of the president and the government of the Russian Federation to the president and the government of Yugoslavia.

The position of Soviet ambassador to Yugoslavia lasted from the first establishment of relations between the Soviet Union and the Kingdom of Yugoslavia in 1940, until the dissolution of the Soviet Union in 1991. This encompassed the period of the Yugoslav government-in-exile between 1941 and 1945, and the establishment of the Federal People's Republic of Yugoslavia in 1945. Relations were briefly broken off between 1949 and 1953, and continued thereafter, including after the renaming of the state as the Socialist Federal Republic of Yugoslavia from 1963 until 1992. Representation was maintained between the Socialist Federal Republic of Yugoslavia and the Soviet Union's successor, the Russian Federation, until the breakup of Yugoslavia in 1992. Thereafter the Russian Federation maintained relations with many of Yugoslavia's successor states, including Serbia and Montenegro, otherwise known as the Federal Republic of Yugoslavia between 1992 and 2003, and the State Union of Serbia and Montenegro from 2003 and 2006. After the separation of this union into the independent countries of Serbia and Montenegro in 2006, the Russian Federation continues to appoint representatives to both of them.

== History of diplomatic relations ==
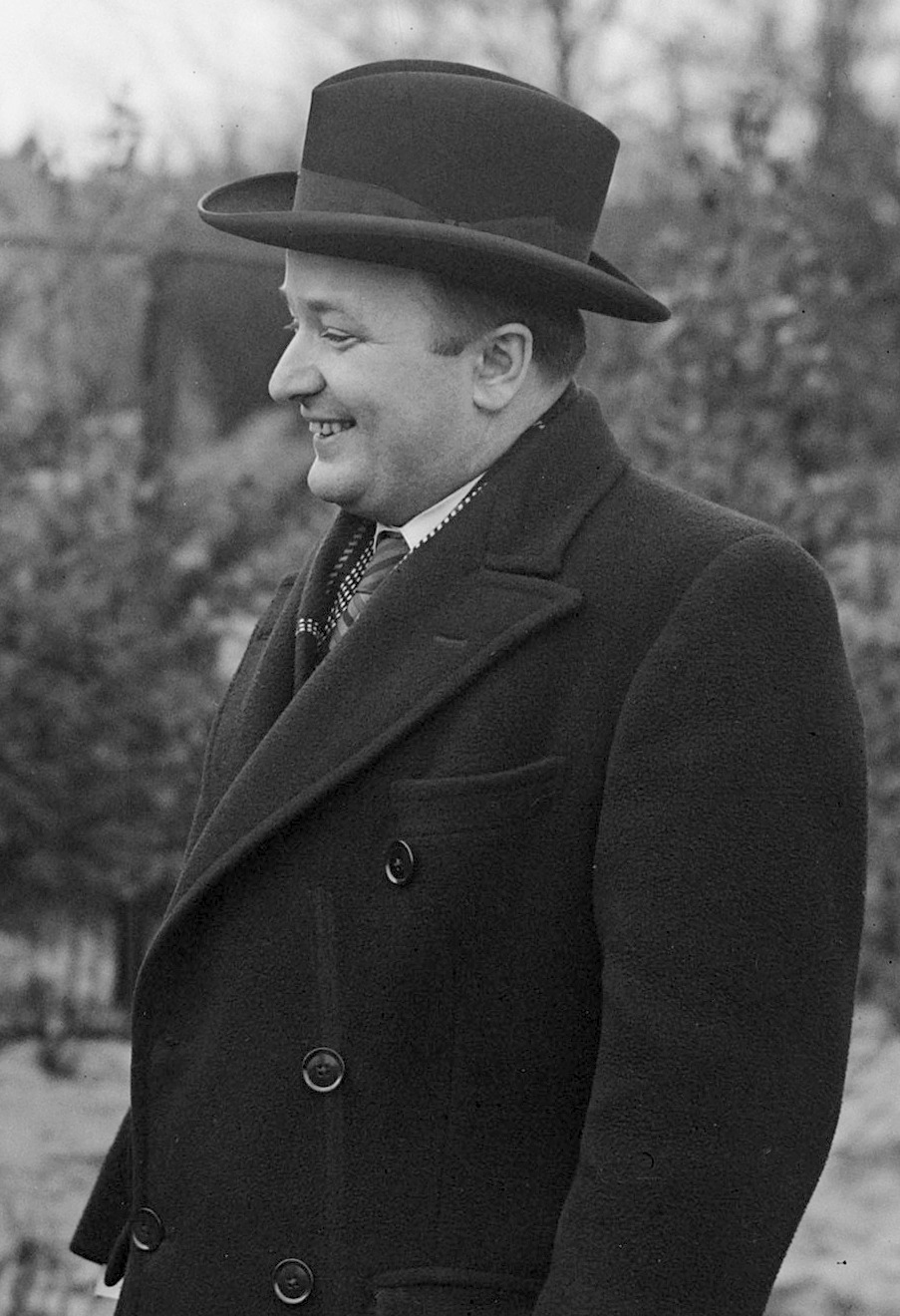
Vasily Valkov, Soviet ambassador to Yugoslavia after the Tito–Stalin split had caused the breaking of diplomatic relations between 1949 and 1953

Diplomatic exchanges between the Soviet Union and Yugoslavia began with the formal establishment of relations on 24 June 1940, towards the very end of the existence of the Kingdom of Yugoslavia, and shortly before its invasion and occupation by Axis forces the following year. The first Soviet representative, Viktor Plotnikov, was appointed on 26 June 1940, and presented his credentials on 12 July 1940. With the invasion and occupation of Yugoslavia in 1941, a Yugoslav government-in-exile was established, eventually settling in London. The Soviet ambassador to the Allied governments Aleksandr Bogomolov, representative to many of the governments-in-exile that were based in London during the occupation of their countries, was accredited to the Yugoslav government-in-exile from 21 August 1941 onwards. During the war, power shifted to the hands of the Partisan movement, led by Josip Broz Tito, and with the expulsion of Axis forces towards the end of the war, Tito formed a government to which the Soviet Union duly accredited Ivan Sadchikov as its first ambassador. Sadchikov was succeeded by Anatoly Lavrentiev in 1946, but relations between Titov and Stalin soured during the second half of the 1940s, and diplomatic relations were broken off in 1949. They were only restored in 1953 following Stalin's death in March that year, and in June 1953 Vasily Valkov was appointed the new Soviet ambassador. Relations were maintained thereafter, including during the changing of the country's name to the Socialist Federal Republic of Yugoslavia in 1963, with the last Soviet ambassador, Gennady Shikin, being appointed in September 1991. With the dissolution of the Soviet Union in December 1991, Shikin remained as ambassador of the Russian Federation, and continued to serve during the breakup of Yugoslavia in 1992.

With the breakup of Yugoslavia, many of the former constituent republics declared independence and established themselves as separate nations. The Russian Federation duly established relations and appointed ambassadors to them: to Croatia in 1992, to Slovenia in 1994, to Bosnia and Herzegovina and to Macedonia in 1996. The former republics of Serbia and Montenegro combined to form the Federal Republic of Yugoslavia in 1992, and Shikin continued as ambassador in Belgrade to this state until 1996. In 2003 the Federal Republic of Yugoslavia was officially renamed the State Union of Serbia and Montenegro, and three years later was dissolved to form the separate states of Serbia, and Montenegro. The incumbent ambassador to Serbia and Montenegro, Aleksandr Alekseyev, continued as ambassador to Serbia, while a new ambassador, Yakov Gerasimov, was appointed ambassador to Montenegro in 2007.

== List of representatives (1940–1992) ==
=== Soviet Union to the Kingdom of Yugoslavia (1940–1941) ===
Name	Title	Appointment	Termination	Notes
Viktor Plotnikov	Plenipotentiary	26 June 1940	8 May 1941	

=== Soviet Union to the Yugoslav government-in-exile (1941–1945) ===
Name	Title	Appointment	Termination	Notes
Aleksandr Bogomolov	Ambassador	21 August 1941	12 November 1943	
Nikolai Novikov	Ambassador	31 October 1943	16 November 1944	
Viktor Lebedev	Ambassador	16 November 1944	13 March 1945	

=== Soviet Union to the Socialist Yugoslavia (1945–1991) ===
Name	Title	Appointment	Termination	Notes
Ivan Sadchikov	Ambassador	13 March 1945	26 February 1946	
Anatoly Lavrentiev	Ambassador	13 March 1946	16 August 1949	
Tito–Stalin split and Informbiro period - Diplomatic relations interrupted (1949 - 1953)
Vasily Valkov	Ambassador	27 June 1953	23 August 1955	
Nikolay Firyubin	Ambassador	23 August 1955	1 October 1957	
Ivan Zamchevsky	Ambassador	1 October 1957	27 November 1960	
Alexei Yepishev	Ambassador	27 November 1960	30 June 1962	
Alexander Puzanov	Ambassador	30 June 1962	12 April 1967	
Ivan Benediktov	Ambassador	12 April 1967	19 January 1971	
Vladimir Stepakov	Ambassador	19 January 1971	16 May 1978	
Nikolai Rodionov	Ambassador	16 May 1978	27 May 1986	
Viktor Maltsev	Ambassador	27 May 1986	28 November 1988	
Vadim Loginov	Ambassador	28 November 1988	20 September 1991	
Gennady Shikin	Ambassador	20 September 1991	25 December 1991	

=== Russian Federation to the Socialist Yugoslavia (1991–1992) ===
Name	Title	Appointment	Termination	Notes
Gennady Shikin	Ambassador	25 December 1991	28 April 1992	

=== Russian Federation to Serbia and Montenegro (1992–2006) ===
Name	Title	Appointment	Termination	Notes
Gennady Shikin	Ambassador	28 April 1992	29 January 1996	
Yury Kotov	Ambassador	29 January 1996	31 December 1999	
Valery Yegoshkin	Ambassador	31 December 1999	7 February 2002	
Vladimir Ivanovsky	Ambassador	7 February 2002	22 September 2004	
Aleksandr Alekseyev	Ambassador	22 September 2004	5 June 2006	

== Appointment of representatives to successor nations ==
Post	Name	Appointment	Notes
Ambassador to Croatia	Leonid Kerestedzhiyants	8 September 1992	
Ambassador to Slovenia	Aleksey Nikiforov	23 December 1994	
Ambassador to Macedonia	Pyotr Dobroserdov	25 September 1996	
Ambassador to Bosnia and Herzegovina	Yakov Gerasimov	December 1996	
Ambassador to Serbia	Aleksandr Alekseyev	5 June 2006	
Ambassador to Montenegro	Yakov Gerasimov	29 January 2007	
