= List of ambassadors of Russia to Bulgaria =

Ambassador of the Russian Federation to the Republic of Bulgaria
- Emblem of the Russian Foreign Ministry

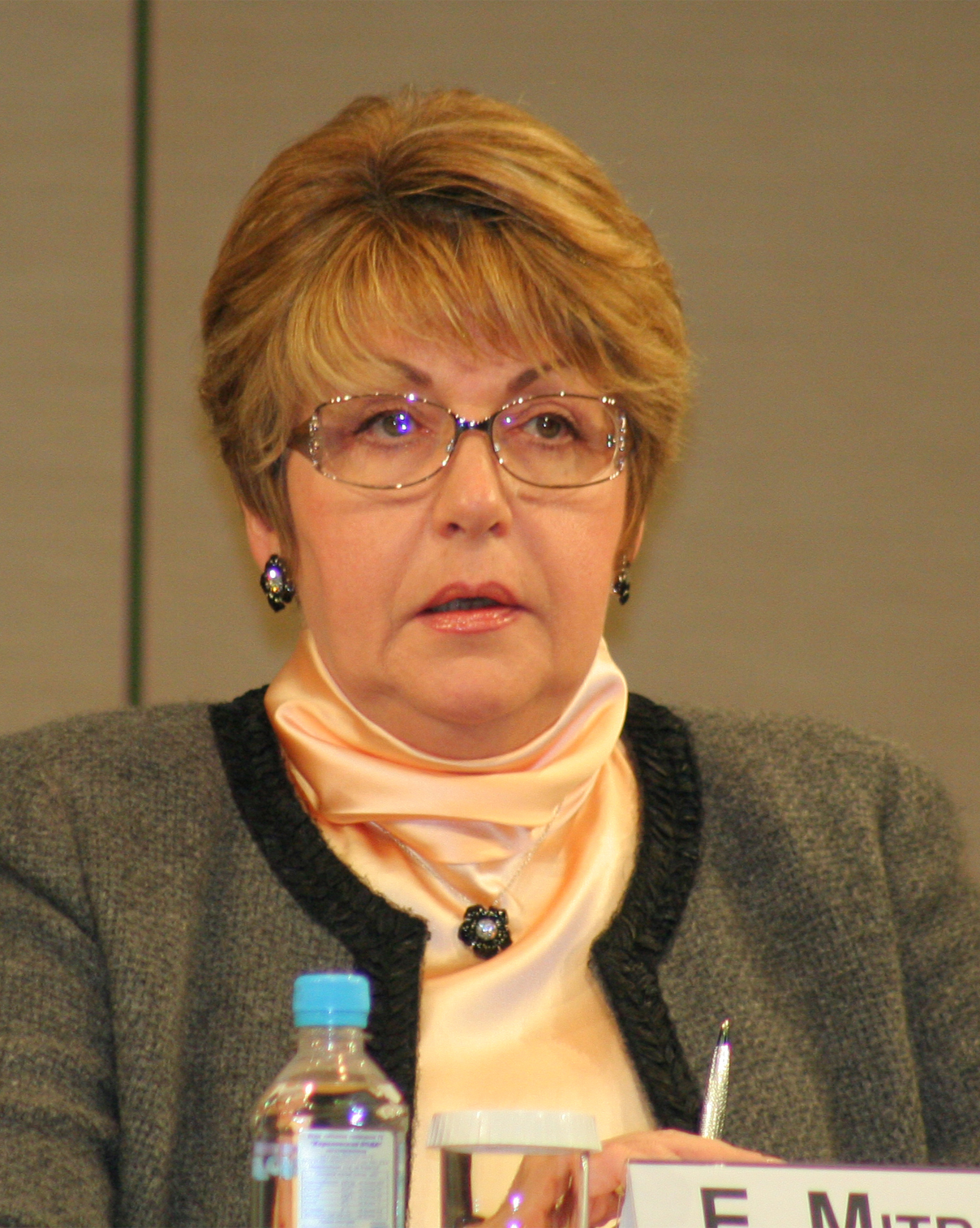
- Incumbent; Eleonora Mitrofanova since 15 January 2021
- Ministry of Foreign Affairs; Embassy of Russia in Sofia
- Style: His Excellency; The Honourable
- Reports to: Minister of Foreign Affairs
- Seat: Sofia
- Appointer: President of Russia
- Term length: At the pleasure of the president
- Website: Embassy of Russia in Bulgaria

The ambassador extraordinary and plenipotentiary of the Russian Federation to the Republic of Bulgaria is the official representative of the president and the government of the Russian Federation to the president and the government of Bulgaria.

The ambassador and his staff work at large in the Embassy of Russia in Sofia. There are consulates general in Rousse and Varna. The post of Russian ambassador to Bulgaria is currently held by Eleonora Mitrofanova, incumbent since 15 January 2021.

== History of diplomatic relations ==
Diplomatic relations between the Russian Empire and the Principality of Bulgaria were established on 7 July 1879, in the aftermath of the Russo-Turkish War of 1877–1878, which established a de facto independent Bulgarian state. State Counselor Aleksandr Davydov was appointed "diplomatic agent and consul general in Bulgaria" on 13 September [O.S. 25 September] 1878, and presented his credentials to Alexander of Battenberg on 7 July [O.S. 25 June] 1879. Bulgarian policy thereafter diverged from Russian interests, and after Bulgarian success in the Serbo-Bulgarian War in 1885, Russia compelled Alexander to abdicate the following year, and diplomatic relations were interrupted. They were restored in 1896.

Diplomatic relations were again suspended on 6 October 1915, after Bulgaria's entry into the First World War on the side of the Central Powers. After the withdrawal of Russia from the war and the signing of the Treaty of Brest-Litovsk on 3 March 1918, diplomatic relations were nominally restored between the Russian government, now under Bolshevik leadership, and the Central Powers. Stefan Chaproshikov was appointed to head the Bulgarian mission to the Russian Soviet Federative Socialist Republic, and was able to present his credentials to Yakov Sverdlov, Chairman of the Central Executive Committee of the All-Russian Congress of Soviets. With the defeat of the Central Powers in 1918, the Treaty of Brest-Litovsk was formally abrogated on 13 November 1918 by the All-Russian Central Executive Committee, and diplomatic relations were again suspended.

Diplomatic relations between the Soviet Union and Bulgaria were established at the mission level in 1934, and continued during the Second World War, despite the fact the Bulgaria was nominally part of the Tripartite Pact alongside Germany, Italy and Japan. On 5 September 1944, with the Red Army advancing towards the Balkans, the Soviet Union declared war on Bulgaria. Bulgarian forces offered little resistance to the advancing Soviets, and the country was occupied. Relations between the Soviet Union and Bulgaria were restored in August 1945, and on 6 January 1946 an agreement was reached to upgrade the diplomatic missions into embassies. With the dissolution of the Soviet Union in 1991, the Soviet ambassador continued as representative of the Russian Federation.

== List of representatives (1878–present) ==
=== Russian Empire to Bulgaria (1878–1915) ===
Name	Title	Appointment	Termination	Notes
Aleksandr Davydov	Diplomatic agent and consul general	18 August 1878	26 April 1880	
Alexey Kumani	Diplomatic agent and consul general	26 April 1880	29 March 1881	
Mikhail Khitrovo	Diplomatic agent and consul general	29 March 1881	2 March 1883	
Aleksandr Ionin	Special representative	1 August 1883	March 1884	
Aleksandr Koyander	Diplomatic agent	25 February 1884	3 June 1886	
Nikolai Kaulbars	Diplomatic agent	2 February 1886	9 November 1886	
Nikolai Charykov	Diplomatic agent	1 February 1896	18 February 1897	
Georgiy Bakhmetev	Diplomatic agent	18 February 1897	1905	
Andrey Shcheglov	Envoy	1906	1907	
Dmitry Sementovsky-Kurillo	Envoy	1907	1911	
Anatoly Neklyudov	Envoy	1911	1913	
Aleksandr Savinsky	Envoy	1913	1915	

=== Soviet Union to Bulgaria (1934–1991) ===
Name	Title	Appointment	Termination	Notes
Fyodor Raskolnikov	Plenipotentiary	31 August 1934	5 April 1938	
Anatoly Lavrentiev	Plenipotentiary	30 September 1939	14 June 1940	
Aleksandr Lavrishev	Plenipotentiary (before 9 May 1940); Envoy (after 9 May 1940)	22 June 1940	1944	
Dmitry Fedichkin	Diplomatic representative	1944	5 September 1944	
Stepan Kirsanov	Envoy (until 6 January 1948); Then Ambassador	22 August 1945	6 August 1948	
Mikhail Bodrov	Ambassador	6 August 1948	28 January 1954	
Yury Prikhodov	Ambassador	28 January 1954	25 May 1960	
Georgy Denisov	Ambassador	25 May 1960	12 January 1963	
Nikolai Organov	Ambassador	12 January 1963	12 April 1967	
Alexander Puzanov	Ambassador	12 April 1967	4 May 1972	
Vladimir Bazovsky	Ambassador	4 May 1972	8 May 1979	
Nikita Tolubeyev	Ambassador	8 May 1979	10 July 1983	
Leonid Grekov	Ambassador	10 July 1983	26 February 1988	
Viktor Sharapov	Ambassador	26 February 1988	25 December 1991	

=== Russian Federation to Bulgaria (1991–present) ===
Name	Title	Appointment	Termination	Notes
Viktor Sharapov	Ambassador	25 December 1991	22 April 1992	
Aleksandr Avdeyev	Ambassador	28 July 1992	2 November 1996	
Leonid Kerestedzhiyants	Ambassador	2 November 1996	31 December 1999	
Vladimir Titov	Ambassador	31 December 1999	25 May 2004	
Anatoly Potapov	Ambassador	25 May 2004	14 July 2008	
Yury Isakov	Ambassador	14 July 2008	17 August 2016	
Antaloy Makarov	Ambassador	17 August 2016	15 January 2021	
Eleonora Mitrofanova	Ambassador	15 January 2021		
