= Vasily Valkov =

Soviet diplomat and political analyst

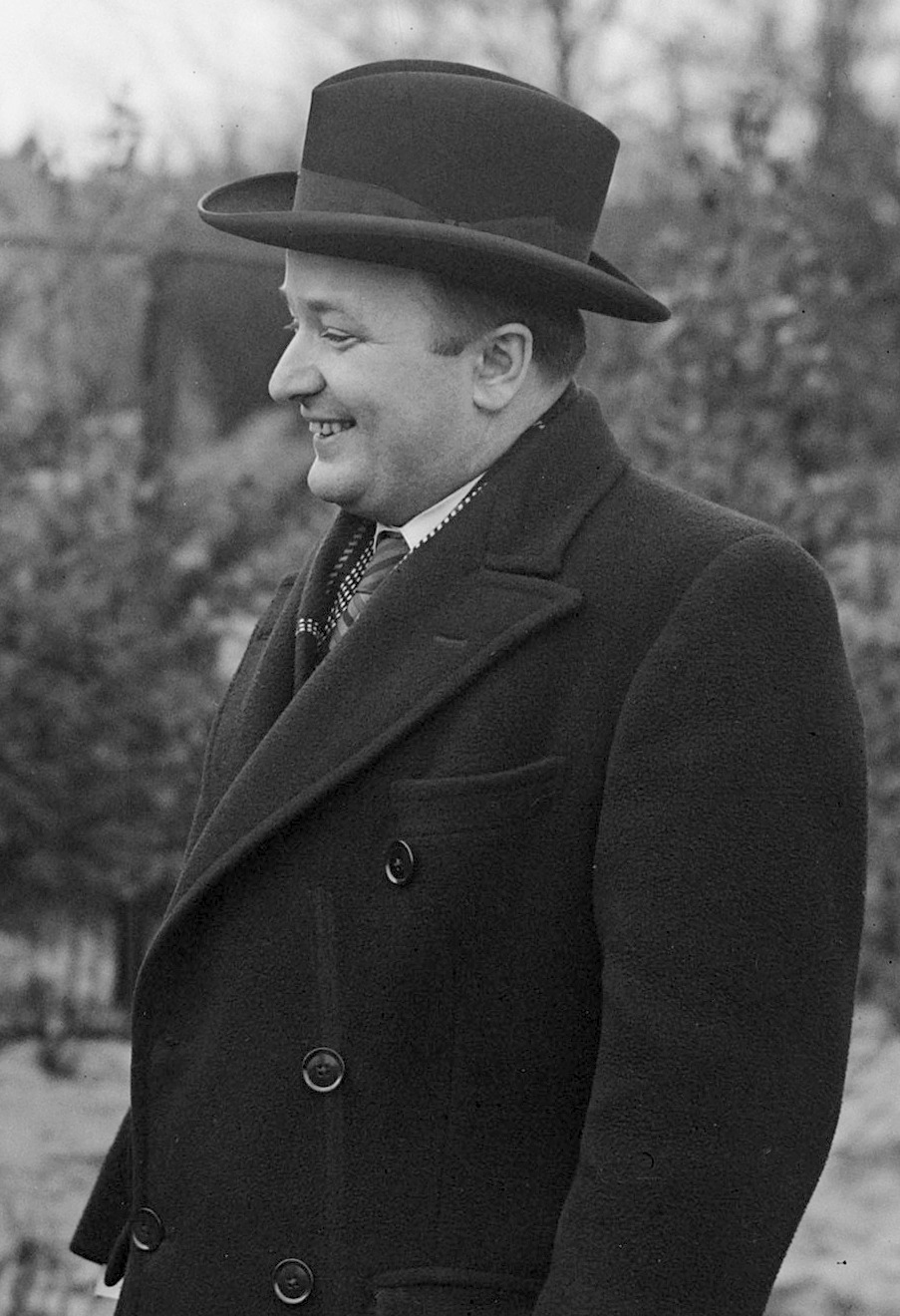
Vasily Valkov in the Netherlands in 1948

Vasily Alekseyevich Valkov (Russian: Василий Алексеевич Вальков; 1904 – 1972) was a Soviet diplomat and political analyst.

Valkov held the following positions:

- 1942–1945 – Advisor at the Soviet Embassy in London
- 1945–1949 – Ambassador of the Soviet Union to the Netherlands
- 1949–1951 – Deputy head of the Balkan Department at the Ministry of Foreign Affairs
- 1951–1953 – Head of the Balkan Department at the Ministry of Foreign Affairs.
- 1953–1955 – Ambassador of the Soviet Union to Yugoslavia
- 1955–1956 – Official of the Ministry of Foreign Affairs
- 1956–1972 – Official at the Institute of World Economy and International Relations

In the 1960s he published three books on international politics:

- Индонезия на пути независимого развития. Изд-во Института международных отношений. 1960.
- Экономика и политика Голландии после Второй Мировой войны. Изд-во Ин-та международных отношений. 1961.
- СССР и США: (их политические и экономические отношения). Наука. 1965.
