= Eleonora Mitrofanova =

Russian politician and diplomat

- Элеонора Митрофанова
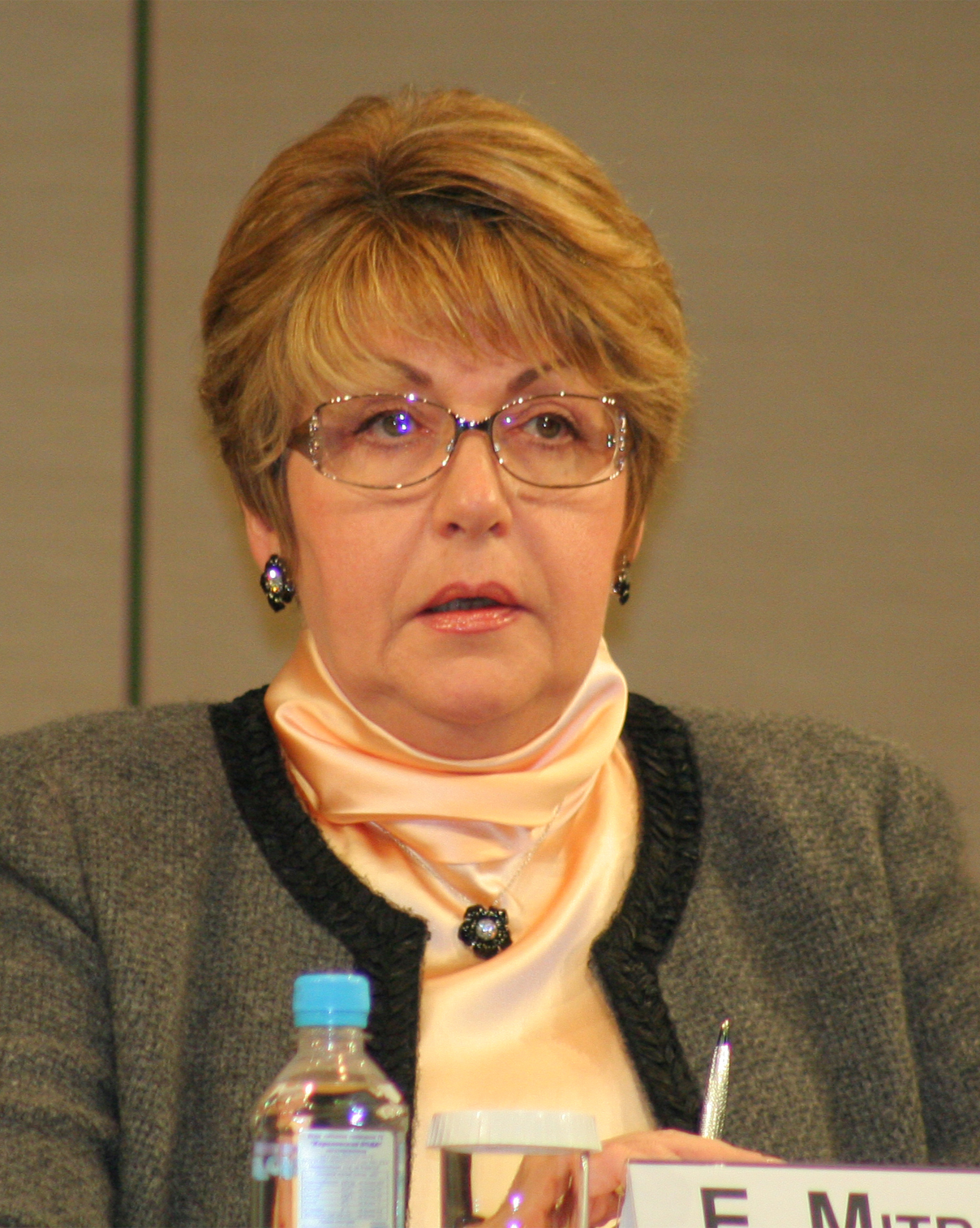
- Mitrofanova in 2010

Ambassador of Russia to Bulgaria
- Incumbent
- Assumed office 15 January 2021
- Preceded by: Anatoly Makarov

Head of Rossotrudnichestvo
- In office 19 December 2017 – 25 June 2020
- Preceded by: Lyubov Glebova
- Succeeded by: Yevgeny Primakov Jr.

Permanent Delegate of Russia to UNESCO
- In office 29 January 2009 – 19 September 2016
- Preceded by: Vladimir Kalamanov
- Succeeded by: Alexandre Kouznetsov

Head of Roszarubezhcenter
- In office August 2004 – 17 October 2008
- Preceded by: Valentina Tereshkova
- Succeeded by: Farit Mukhametshin (as head of Rossotrudnichestvo)

Personal details
- Born: 11 June 1953 (age 73) Stalingrad, RSFSR, Soviet Union
- Spouse: Vladimir Tyrtychnikov
- Children: Maria, Andrei, Fiodor
- Education: Moscow State Institute of International Relations

Eleonora Valentinovna Mitrofanova (Russian: Элеонора Валентиновна Митрофанова; born 11 June 1953) is a Russian diplomat. She currently serves as the Ambassador of Russia to Bulgaria, having held the post since 15 January 2021. She is the first woman to hold the post of First Deputy Minister of Foreign Affairs.

== Career ==
Mitrofanova is a graduate of the Moscow State Institute of International Relations, specializing in International economics.

=== Deputy Minister of Foreign Affairs (2003–2009) ===
In May 2003, President Vladimir Putin appointed Mitrofanova by decree to the post of First Deputy Minister of Foreign Affairs. After the abolition of the Russian Ministry of Affairs of Federation and Nationalities, her mandate included also the activities of the Roszaroubezhcentre of the MFA.

=== Ambassador-at-large to UNESCO (2009–2016) ===
She was previously ambassador-at-large of the Ministry of Foreign Affairs and a Permanent Delegate to UNESCO.

=== Ambassador to Bulgaria (2021–present) ===
On 15 January 2021, she was appointed Ambassador of Russia to Bulgaria.

As a result of the 2022 Russian invasion of Ukraine and the Russian government's response to it in Bulgaria, in late March 2022, Mitrofanova was criticized for making "undiplomatic, sharp and rude" statements against the Bulgarian government and its citizens.

In April 2022, Mitrofanova proceeded to harshly criticize an initiative of the Bulgarian citizens and government to rename the alley in front of the Russian Embassy to Heroes Of Ukraine Lane, and a neighboring alley to Boris Nemtsov Lane, in commemoration of the infamously slain Russian opposition figure.

In the wake of such controversies, there have been widespread talks about declaring Mitrofanova persona-non-grata, due to the abrasive, disrespectful and undiplomatic way in which she has addressed the Bulgarian government and citizens.

In the evening of June 27, 2022 the Russian embassy in Sofia launched a charity appeal for Bulgarians to support the Russian invasion of Ukraine. One day later, Prime Minister Kiril Petkov announced the expulsion of 70 Russian diplomats over concerns of espionage. The Ministry of Foreign Affairs announced that Bulgaria would be temporarily closing down its diplomatic mission in Yekaterinburg and expected Russia to temporarily halt the activities of its own mission in Ruse, Bulgaria. All services of the Russian embassy were halted, and Bulgaria stipulated that from that point on, Russia must follow the official standard of limiting their numbers to 23 diplomatic staff and 25 administrative staff.

On April 20, 2023, Mitrofanova was accused of violating Article 41 of the Vienna Convention.

== Personal life ==
She is married and is the mother of three children. Her brother Alexei Mitrofanov is a politician and former MP. Besides Russian, she is fluent in English, Spanish and French.

== Decorations ==
- Medal of the Order "For Merit to the Fatherland" (2008)
- Order of Friendship (2003)
- Order of Honour (2013)
- Olympia National Award (2003)
- Order of Douslyk (Tatarstan, 2017)
- Order of the Holy Queen of Milica (Serbian Orthodox Church, 2018)
