= Vladimir Matskevich =

Soviet politician (1909–1998)

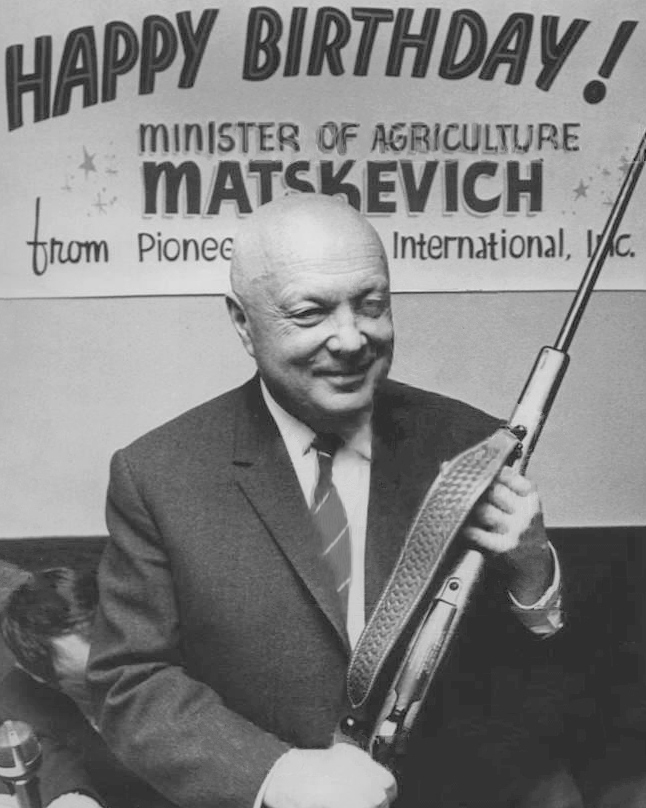
Matskevich at his 62nd birthday party in Iowa, U.S., holding a Weatherby Mark IV hunting rifle, a gift from the American host.

Vladimir Vladimirovich Matskevich (Russian: Владимир Владимирович Мацкевич; 14 December 1909 – 7 November 1998) was the Deputy Chairman of the Soviet Council of Ministers from 9 April 1956 to 25 December 1956.

== Early life ==
Matskevich was born in the village of Privolye-Marienthal, Chortitza volost (today village Prydniprovske, Zaporizhzhia Oblast, Ukraine), in the family of an agronomist. He graduated from the Kharkov Zootechnical Institute in 1932.

== Agriculture Minister ==
Matskevich was the Soviet Agriculture Minister from 14 October 1955 to 29 December 1960 under Nikolai Bulganin and again from 18 February 1965 to 2 February 1973 under Alexei Kosygin. Matskevich conferred with his American counterpart Secretary Earl Butz leading to a three-year, $750,000,000 deal for the Soviet Union to purchase grain from the United States. Henry Kissinger announced the deal from the "Western White House" at San Clemente on 8 July 1972. The Soviets needed to make up for agricultural shortfalls, agreeing to purchase the grain on credit at 6 1/8% annual interest, the standard rate for the Commodity Credit Corporation of the U.S. Department of Agriculture.

== Leadership ==
Matskevich served as the Ambassador of the Soviet Union to Czechoslovakia from 27 April 1973 to 6 February 1980. He was elected to the Soviet Central Committee in the 20th, 24th, and 25th Congresses of the Communist Party, serving from 1956 to 1961 and 1971 to 1981.
