= Zovreti =

Zovreti ზოვრეთი
- Location of Zovreti in Georgia
- Coordinates: 42°11′00″N 43°02′27″E
- Country: Georgia
- Mkhare: Imereti
- Municipality: Zestaponi Municipality
- Elevation: 790 ft (240 m)

Population (2014)
  - Total: 1,513
- Time zone: UTC+4 (Georgian Time)

Zovreti (Georgian: ზოვრეთი) is a village in the Imereti region of Georgia.
