= Odesa Regional Committee of the Communist Party of Ukraine =

The Odesa Regional Committee of the Communist Party of Ukraine (Ukrainian: Одеський обласний комітет Комуністичної партії України, romanized: Odeskyi oblasnyi komitet Komunistychnoi partii Ukrainy), commonly referred to as the Odesa CPU obkom (Ukrainian: Одеський обком КП України, romanized: Odeskyi obkom KP Ukrainy), was the position of highest authority in the Odesa Oblast, in the Ukrainian SSR of the Soviet Union. The position was created on February 27, 1932, and abolished in August 1991. The First Secretary was a de facto appointed position usually by the Central Committee of the Communist Party of Ukraine or the First Secretary of the Communist Party of Ukraine.

== List of First Secretaries of the Communist Party of Odesa ==
Name	Term of Office		Life years
Name	Start	End	Life years
First Secretaries of the Oblast Committee of the Communist Party
Mykhailo Mayorov	February 1932	February 11, 1933	1890–1938
Yevhen Veher	February 11, 1933	July 1937	1899–1938
Dmytro Yevtushenko	July 1937	September 28, 1937	1898–1938
Mykola Kondakov (Note: Acting)	September 28, 1937	May 4, 1938	1901–1938
Hryhoriy Teleshev	May 4, 1938	January 1939	1902–1978
Anatoliy Kolybanov	1939	August 1941	1905–1978
Romanian occupation (part of the Transnistria Governorate, 1941–1944)
Anatoliy Kolybanov	1944	July 1945	1905–1978
Oleksiy Kirichenko	July 1945	December 1949	1908–1975
Oleksiy Yepishev	January 1950	September 4, 1951	1908–1985
Vasyl Markov	September 4, 1951	March 29, 1953	1905–1978
Oleksiy Yepishev	March 29, 1953	August 13, 1955	1908–1985
Leontiy Naydek	August 13, 1955	January 11, 1958	1907–1992
Oleksandr Fedoseyev	January 11, 1958	February 8, 1961	1909–1975
Mykhailo Synytsya (Note: For Industry January 10, 1963 – December 1964)	February 8, 1961	May 8, 1970	1913–1985
Petro Doroshenko (Note: For Agriculture)	January 14, 1963	December 1964	1907–19..
Pavlo Kozyr	May 8, 1970	July 1977	1913–19..
Mykola Kirichenko	July 1977	October 12, 1983	1923–1986
Anatoliy Nochovkin	October 12, 1983	November 4, 1988	1928–
Georgiy Kryuchkov	November 4, 1988	April 3, 1990	1929–
Ruslan Bodelan	April 3, 1990	August 1991	1942–

== See also ==
- Odesa Oblast

== Sources ==
- World Statesmen.org
