= Marshal of the Soviet Union =

Highest Soviet military rank

Marshal of the Soviet Union Маршал Советского Союза
- Marshal's star – big

- Uniform shoulder strap (1955–1991)
- Country: Soviet Union
- Service branch: Red Army (1922–1946); Soviet Army (1946–1991)
- Rank: General officer
- Formation: 22 September 1935; 90 years ago
- Abolished: December 1991; 34 years ago
- Next higher rank: Generalissimo
- Next lower rank: Army General; Marshal of the branch
- Equivalent ranks: Admiral of the Fleet; Chief marshal of the branch

Rank insignias of Marshal of the Soviet Union

Gorget patch
1935–1940

Gorget patch
1940–1943

Sleeve chevron
1940–1943

Shoulder board
1943–1955

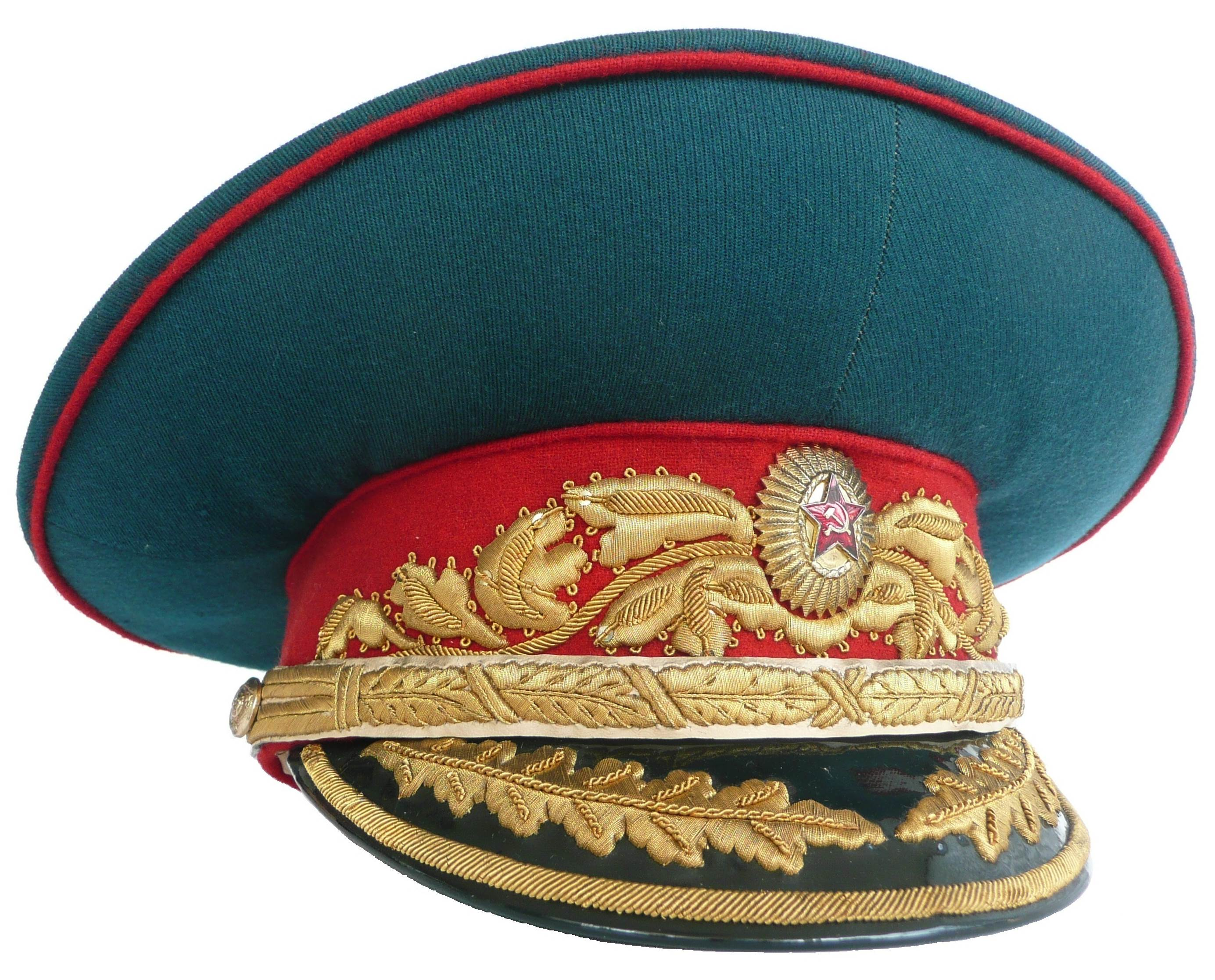
Peaked cap
1945–1991

Marshal of the Soviet Union (Russian: Маршал Советского Союза, romanized: Marshal sovetskogo soyuza, pronounced [ˈmarʂəl sɐˈvʲetskəvə sɐˈjuzə]) was the second-highest military rank of the Soviet Union. It was de facto the highest rank because its superior rank, Generalissimo, was only applied to Joseph Stalin, who preferred to wear the uniform and insignia of a Marshal after World War II.

The rank of Marshal of the Soviet Union was created in 1935 and abolished in 1991 when the Soviet Union dissolved. Forty-one people held this rank. The equivalent naval rank was until 1955 admiral of the fleet and from 1955 Admiral of the Fleet of the Soviet Union.

== History of the rank ==
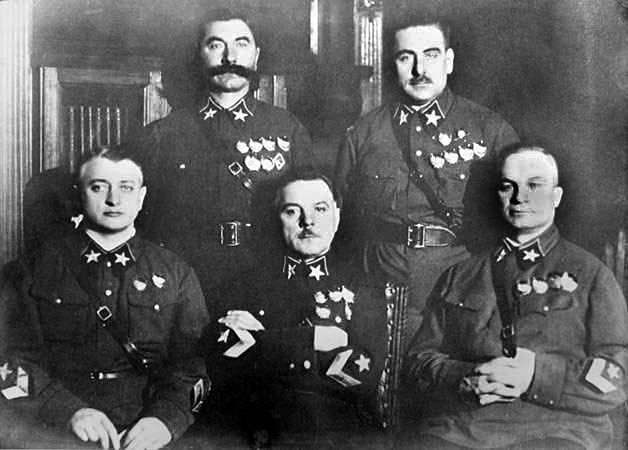
The first five marshals of the Soviet Union from left to right: Mikhail Tukhachevsky, Semyon Budyonny, Kliment Voroshilov, Vasily Blyukher, and Alexander Yegorov. Only Budyonny and Voroshilov survived the Great Purge.

The military rank of Marshal of the Soviet Union was established by a decree of the Soviet Cabinet, the Council of People's Commissars (Sovnarkom), on 22 September 1935. On 20 November, the rank was conferred on five people: People's Commissar of Defence and veteran Bolshevik Kliment Voroshilov, chief of the General Staff of the Red Army Alexander Yegorov, and three senior commanders, Vasily Blyukher, Semyon Budyonny, and Mikhail Tukhachevsky.

Of these, Blyukher, Tukhachevsky, and Yegorov were executed during Stalin's Great Purge of 1937–38. On 7 May 1940, three new marshals were appointed: the new People's Commissar of Defence, Semyon Timoshenko, Boris Shaposhnikov, and Grigory Kulik.

During World War II, Kulik was demoted for incompetence, and the rank of Marshal of the Soviet Union was given to a number of military commanders who earned it on merit. These included Georgy Zhukov, Ivan Konev and Konstantin Rokossovsky to name a few. In 1943, Stalin himself was made a Marshal of the Soviet Union, and in 1945, he was joined by his intelligence and police chief Lavrentiy Beria. These non-military marshals were joined in 1947 by politician Nikolai Bulganin.

Two Marshals were executed in postwar purges: Kulik in 1950 and Beria in 1953, following Stalin's death. Thereafter the rank was awarded only to professional soldiers, with the exception of Leonid Brezhnev, who made himself a marshal in 1976, and Dmitry Ustinov, who was prominent in the arms industry and was appointed Minister of Defence in July 1976. The last Marshal of the Soviet Union was Dmitry Yazov, appointed in 1990, who was imprisoned after the failed coup against Mikhail Gorbachev in 1991. Marshal Sergei Akhromeyev committed suicide in 1991 during the fall of the Soviet Union.

The Marshals fell into three generational groups.

- Those who had gained their reputations during the Russian Civil War. These included both those who were purged in 1937–38 (Blyukher, Tukhachevsky, and Yegorov), and those who held high commands in the early years of World War II (Budyonny, Kulik, Shaposhnikov, Timoshenko and Voroshilov). All of the latter except Shaposhnikov and Timoshenko proved out-of-step with modern warfare and were removed from commanding positions.
- Those who built their reputations during World War II and assumed high commands in the latter part of the war. These included Zhukov, Vasilevsky, Konev, Rokossovsky, Malinovsky, Tolbukhin, Govorov, and Meretskov.
- Those who assumed high command during the Cold War era. All were officers in World War II, but their higher commands were held in the Warsaw Pact or as Soviet defence ministers. These included Sokolovsky, Grechko, Yakubovsky, Kulikov, Ogarkov, Akhromeyev, and Yazov.

All marshals in the third category had been officers in World War II, except Ustinov, who had been People's Commissar for Armaments. Even Yazov, who was 20 when the war ended, had been a platoon commander. Brezhnev was not a professional soldier, but was still commissioned as a political commissar in the war.

Of the 35 Marshals who were career soldiers, the majority were of Russian origin. Timoshenko (Tymoshenko), Kulik (Kulyk), Grechko (Hrechko), Yeremenko (Yeryomenko), Moskalenko, Batitsky (Batytsʹkyy) and Koshevoy (Koshovyy) were of Ukrainian origin, while Sokolovsky (Sakaloŭski) and Yakubovsky (Jakuboŭski) had Belarusian origins. Rokossovsky (Rokossowski) was born in Congress Poland to a Polish family, while Malinovsky (Malinowsky) was born in Odessa (now in Ukraine) to a Polish father. Tukhachevsky also had Polish ancestry. Bagramyan (Baghramyan) was the sole marshal of Armenian origin.

The rank was abolished with the dissolution of the Soviet Union in December 1991. It was succeeded in modern Russia by the rank of Marshal of the Russian Federation, which has been held by only one person, Igor Sergeyev, who was Russia's defence minister from 1997 to 2001. There have been no living marshals since Yazov's death in February 2020.

== List of marshals ==
List of Marshals of the Soviet Union
No.	Name	Photo	Date of rank	Positions held (Note: Positions held during active service as a marshal, within the Red Army/Soviet Armed Forces, Communist Party, or non-CPSU governmental apparatus. Selected minor positions are hidden.)	Central Committee member	Secretariat member	Politburo member	Yrs (Note: Years spent in active service as a marshal. Soviet marshals, with a few exceptions, typically held prominent positions—including full or candidate membership of the CPSU's Central Committee and Politburo/Presidium—without explicitly retiring. Interregna between the holding of such positions are not counted. Retirement or termination as a marshal for the purpose of counting years on this list are: Appointment as a member of the Group of Inspectors General, a sinecure for superannuated senior officers (e.g. Timoshenko, Vasilevsky, Konev).; Demotion in rank (e.g. Kulik).; Resignation or dismissal from office or as a member of ruling Communist Party or state organs (e.g. Voroshilov, Zhukov, Sokolov).; Death in office (e.g. Stalin, Brezhnev, Ustinov).; Arrest and/or execution, with summary dismissal from all offices (e.g. Blyukher, Tukhachevsky, Beria).)	Notes (Note: Includes lifespan; awards of the Hero of the Soviet Union, Hero of Socialist Labour, and Order of Victory; major appointments before promotion to and after retirement as a marshal; and unusual career events such as demotion, removal from office, and purges by Communist Party leadership.)
1	Kliment Voroshilov		20 Nov 1935	People's Commissar for Defence, 1934–1938.; People's Commissar for Defence/Chairman, Main Military Council of the Red Army, 1938–1940.; Deputy Chairman, Council of Ministers, 1940–1953. (Note: as Deputy Chairman, Council of People's Commissars (1940–1946)); Chairman, Allied Control Commission in Hungary, 1945–1947.; Chairman, Presidium of the Supreme Soviet, 1953–1960.; Other positions (1939–1942): Commander in Chief, Soviet Forces in Finland, 1939–1940.; Chairman, Defence Committee, Council of People's Commissars, 1940.; Commander in Chief, Northwestern Direction, 1941.; Commander in Chief, Leningrad Front, 1941.; Stavka Representative to the Volkhov Front, 1942.; Commander in Chief, Central Headquarters of the Partisan Movement, 1942.	Yes (10th–20th, 23rd)	No	Yes (14th–20th)	25	(1881–1969) Resigned as head of state, 1960. Mayor of Luhansk, 1917; People's Commissar for Military and Naval Affairs, 1925–1934. Made Hero of the Soviet Union, 1956 and 1968; Hero of Socialist Labour, 1960.
2	Semyon Budyonny		20 Nov 1935	Inspector of Cavalry, Red Army, 1924–1937.; Commander, Moscow Military District, 1937–1940.; First Deputy People's Commissar for Defence, 1940–1942.; Deputy People's Commissar for Defence, 1942–1943.; Inspector of Cavalry, Red Army, 1943–1945.; Deputy Minister of Agriculture, 1947–1954.; Inspector of Cavalry, Soviet Ground Forces, 1953–1954.; Field commands (1940–1942): Commander, 21st Army, 1941.; Commander in Chief, Southwestern Direction, 1941.; Commander in Chief, Reserve Front, 1941.; Commander in Chief, North Caucasus Direction, 1942.; Commander in Chief, North Caucasus Front, 1942.	Yes (Candidate: 17th, 19th–24th; Full: 18th)	No	No	17	(1883–1973) Retired, 1954. Made Hero of the Soviet Union, 1958, 1963 and 1968.
3	Mikhail Tukhachevsky		20 Nov 1935	First Deputy People's Commissar for Defence/Chief of Ordnance, Red Army, 1931–1936.; Deputy People's Commissar for Defence/Inspector of Military Training, Red Army, 1936–1937.	Candidate (17th)	No	No	2	(1893–1937) (Note: Arrested and stripped of rank, 22 May 1937; executed, 12 June 1937; rehabilitated and posthumously restored as marshal, 31 January 1957.) Stripped of rank, 1937. Posthumously rehabilitated.
4	Alexander Yegorov		20 Nov 1935	Deputy People's Commissar for Defence/Chief, General Staff of the Red Army, 1935–1937.; First Deputy People's Commissar for Defence, 1937–1938.; Commander, Transcaucasian Military District, 1938.	Candidate (17th)	No	No	3	(1883–1939) (Note: Arrested and stripped of rank, February 1938; executed, 23 February 1939; rehabilitated and posthumously restored as marshal, March 1956.) Stripped of rank, 1938. Posthumously rehabilitated.
5	Vasily Blyukher		20 Nov 1935	Commander, Special Red Banner Far Eastern Army, 1935–1938.; Commander in Chief, Far Eastern Front, 1938.	Yes (17th) (Note: Candidate member of the 17th Central Committee until promotion at the 12th Plenary Session (12 October 1937))	No	No	3	(1889–1938) (Note: Arrested, 22 October 1938; died in captivity, 9 November 1938; retroactively stripped of rank, March 1939; rehabilitated and posthumously restored as marshal, 1956.) Retroactively stripped of rank, 1939. Posthumously rehabilitated.
6	Semyon Timoshenko		7 May 1940	People's Commissar for Defence/Chairman, Main Military Council of the Red Army, 1940–1941.; People's Commissar for Defence/Chairman, Headquarters of the Main Command of the Red Army, 1941.; Deputy People's Commissar for Defence, 1941–1943.; Chairman, Stavka of the Supreme High Command, 1943–1945.; Commander, Baranovich Military District, 1945–1946.; Commander, Byelorussian Military District, 1946.; Commander, South Ural Military District, 1946–1949.; Commander, Byelorussian Military District, 1949–1960.; Field commands (1941–1943): Commander in Chief, Western Front, 1941.; Commander in Chief, Western Direction/Commander in Chief, Western Front, 1941.; Commander in Chief, Southwestern Direction, 1941.; Commander in Chief, Southwestern Direction/Commander in Chief, Southwestern Front, 1941.; Commander in Chief, Southwestern Direction, 1941–1942.; Commander in Chief, Southwestern Direction/Commander in Chief, Southwestern Front, 1942.; Commander in Chief, Stalingrad Front, 1942.; Commander in Chief, Northwestern Front, 1942–1943.	Yes (Full: 18th; Candidate: 19th–23rd)	No	No	20	(1895–1970) Appointed to Group of Inspectors General, 1960. Chairman, State Committee for War Veterans, 1961–1970. Made Hero of the Soviet Union, 1940 and 1965; awarded Order of Victory, 1945.
7	Boris Shaposhnikov		7 May 1940	Chief, General Staff of the Red Army, 1937–1940.; Deputy People's Commissar for Defence, 1940–1941.; Deputy People's Commissar for Defence/Chief, General Staff of the Red Army, 1941–1942.; Chief of Staff, Western Front, 1941.; Deputy People's Commissar for Defence, 1942–1943.; Commandant, Kliment E. Voroshilov Higher Military Academy, 1943–1945.	Candidate (18th)	No	No	5	(1882–1945) Died in office.
8	Grigory Kulik		7 May 1940	Deputy People's Commissar for Defence/Deputy Chief, General Staff of the Red Army/Head, Main Artillery Directorate, Red Army, 1937–1941.; Deputy People's Commissar for Defence/Head, Main Formation and Training Directorate, Red Army, 1941.; Deputy People's Commissar for Defence, 1941–1942.; Commander, 54th Army, 1941.; Stavka Representative to the Crimean Front, 1941–1942.	Yes (18th)	No	No	2	(1890–1950) (Note: Stripped of rank and honours, 16 February 1942; dismissed as deputy people's commissar for defence and expelled from Central Committee, 19 February 1942; appointed as major general, 17 March 1942; promoted to lieutenant general, 15 April 1943; demoted to major general, 9 July 1945; arrested and stripped of rank, 11 January 1947; executed, 24 August 1950; rehabilitated and posthumously restored as marshal, 28 September 1957.) Stripped of rank, 1942. Posthumously rehabilitated. Made Hero of the Soviet Union, 1940 (rescinded 1942).
9	Georgy Zhukov		18 Jan 1943	First Deputy People's Commissar for Defence/Deputy Commander in Chief, Red Army/Deputy Chairman, Stavka of the Supreme High Command, 1942–1945.; Commander in Chief, 1st Ukrainian Front, 1944.; Commander in Chief, 1st Byelorussian Front, 1944–1945.; Commander in Chief, Soviet Military Administration in Germany/Commander in Chief, Group of Soviet Occupation Forces in Germany, 1945–1946.; Deputy Minister of the Armed Forces/Commander in Chief, Soviet Ground Forces, 1946.; Commander, Odessa Military District, 1946–1948.; Commander, Ural Military District, 1948–1953.; First Deputy Minister of Defence, 1953–1955. (Note: as First Deputy Minister of War (5–15 March 1953)); Minister of Defence, 1955–1957.	Yes (Candidate: 18th; Full: 19th–20th)	No	Yes (20th)	14	(1896–1974) (Note: Dismissed as minister of defence, 26 October 1957; terminated from active military service, 27 February 1958.) Dismissed as minister of defence, 1957. Chief, General Staff of the Red Army, 1941. Made Hero of the Soviet Union, 1940, 1944, 1945 and 1956; awarded Order of Victory, 1944 and 1945.
10	Aleksandr Vasilevsky		16 Feb 1943	Deputy People's Commissar for Defence/Chief, General Staff of the Red Army, 1942–1945.; Commander in Chief, 3rd Byelorussian Front, 1945.; Commander in Chief, Soviet Forces in the Far East, 1945.; Deputy Minister of the Armed Forces/Chief, General Staff of the Soviet Armed Forces, 1946–1947.; First Deputy Minister of the Armed Forces/Chief, General Staff of the Soviet Armed Forces, 1947–1948.; First Deputy Minister of the Armed Forces, 1948–1949.; Minister of War, 1949–1953. (Note: as Minister of the Armed Forces (1949–1950)); First Deputy Minister of War, 1953.; Deputy Minister of Defence, 1953–1956.; Deputy Minister of Defence for Military Science, 1956–1957.	Yes (19th–20th)	No	No	14	(1895–1977) Appointed to Group of Inspectors General, 1959. Made Hero of the Soviet Union, 1944 and 1945; awarded Order of Victory, 1944 and 1945.
11	Joseph Stalin		6 Mar 1943	General Secretary, Central Committee of the All-Union Communist Party (Bolsheviks), 1922–1952.; Supreme Commander in Chief, Soviet Armed Forces, 1941–1953. (Note: as Supreme Commander in Chief, Red Army (1941–1946)); Chairman, Council of Ministers, 1941–1953. (Note: as Chairman, Council of People's Commissars (1941–1946)); Minister of the Armed Forces, 1941–1947. (Note: as People's Commissar for Defence (1941–1946); People's Commissar for the Armed Forces (February–March 1946)); Chairman, State Defence Committee, 1941–1945.	Yes (6th Conf.–19th)	Yes (11th–19th)	Yes (6th Comp.–19th)	2	(1878–1953) Died in office. Promoted to Generalissimo, 27 Jun 1945. Made Hero of Socialist Labour, 1939; Hero of the Soviet Union, 1945; awarded Order of Victory, 1944.
12	Ivan Konev		20 Feb 1944	Commander in Chief, 2nd Ukrainian Front, 1943–1944.; Commander in Chief, 1st Ukrainian Front, 1944–1945.; Commander in Chief, Central Group of Forces, 1945–1946.; Allied High Commissioner for Austria, 1945–1946.; Deputy Minister of the Armed Forces/Commander in Chief, Soviet Ground Forces, 1946–1950.; Deputy Minister of War/Chief Inspector, Ministry of War, 1950–1951.; Commander, Carpathian Military District, 1951–1955.; First Deputy Minister of Defence/Commander in Chief, Soviet Ground Forces, 1955–1956.; First Deputy Minister of Defence/Supreme Commander, Unified Armed Forces of the Warsaw Treaty Organization, 1956–1960.; Commander in Chief, Group of Soviet Forces in Germany, 1961–1962.	Yes (Candidate: 18th; Full: 19th–24th)	No	No	17	(1897–1973) (Note: Appointed to Group of Inspectors General, July 1960; recalled as marshal to command Group of Soviet Forces in Germany, 13 August 1961; reappointed to Group of Inspectors General, April 1962.) Appointed to Group of Inspectors General, 1960; reappointed, 1962. Made Hero of the Soviet Union, 1944 and 1945; awarded Order of Victory, 1945.
13	Leonid Govorov		18 Jun 1944	Commander in Chief, Leningrad Front, 1942–1945.; Commander in Chief, 2nd Baltic Front, 1945.; Commander, Leningrad Military District, 1945–1946.; Deputy Minister of the Armed Forces/Chief Inspector, Ministry of the Armed Forces, 1946–1948.; Deputy Minister of War/Commander, Air Defence Forces, 1948–1952. (Note: as Deputy Minister of the Armed Forces (until February 1950)); Deputy Minister of War for Combat Training, 1952–1953.; Deputy Minister of Defence/Chief Inspector, Ministry of Defence, 1953–1954.; Deputy Minister of Defence/Commander in Chief, Soviet Air Defence Forces, 1954–1955.	Candidate (19th)	No	No	11	(1897–1955) Died in office. Made Hero of the Soviet Union, 1945; awarded Order of Victory, 1945.
14	Konstantin Rokossovsky		29 Jun 1944	Commander in Chief, 1st Byelorussian Front, 1943–1944.; Commander in Chief, 2nd Byelorussian Front, 1944–1945.; Commander in Chief, Northern Group of Forces, 1945–1949.; Minister of National Defence, Republic of Poland, 1949–1952.; Deputy Chairman, Council of Ministers, Polish People's Republic/Minister of National Defence, Polish People's Republic, 1952–1956.; Deputy Minister of Defence/Chief Inspector, Ministry of Defence, 1956–1957.; Deputy Minister of Defence/Commander, Transcaucasian Military District, 1957–1958.; Deputy Minister of Defence/Chief Inspector, Ministry of Defence, 1958–1962.	Candidate (22nd–23rd)	No	No	18	(1896–1968) Appointed to Group of Inspectors General, 1962. Made Hero of the Soviet Union, 1944 and 1945; awarded Order of Victory, 1945. Made Marshal of Poland, 1949.
15	Rodion Malinovsky		10 Sep 1944	Commander in Chief, 2nd Ukrainian Front, 1944–1945.; Chairman, Allied Control Commission for Romania, 1944–1947.; Commander in Chief, Transbaikal Front, 1945.; Commander, Transbaikal-Amur Military District, 1945–1947.; Commander in Chief, Soviet Forces in the Far East, 1947–1953.; Commander, Far Eastern Military District, 1953–1956.; First Deputy Minister of Defence/Commander in Chief, Soviet Ground Forces, 1956–1957.; Minister of Defence, 1957–1967.	Yes (Candidate: 19th; Full: 20th–23rd)	No	No	23	(1898–1967) Died in office. Made Hero of the Soviet Union, 1945 and 1958; awarded Order of Victory, 1945.
16	Fyodor Tolbukhin		12 Sep 1944	Commander in Chief, 3rd Ukrainian Front, 1944–1945.; Commander in Chief, Southern Group of Forces, 1945–1947.; Commander, Transcaucasus Military District, 1947–1949.	No	No	No	5	(1894–1949) Died in office. Posthumously made Hero of the Soviet Union, 1965; awarded Order of Victory, 1945.
17	Kirill Meretskov		26 Oct 1944	Commander in Chief, Karelian Front, 1944–1945.; Commander, Maritime Group of Forces, 1945.; Commander in Chief, 1st Far Eastern Front, 1945.; Commander, Primorsky Military District, 1945–1947.; Commander, Moscow Military District, 1947–1949.; Commander, Belomorsky Military District, 1949–1951.; Commander, Northern Military District, 1951–1954.; Commander, Infantry Commanders Advanced Training Course "Vystrel", 1954–1955.; Assistant Minister of Defence for Higher Military-Academic Institutions, 1955–1964.	Candidate (18th–19th)	No	No	20	(1897–1968) Appointed to Group of Inspectors General, 1964. Chief, General Staff of the Red Army, 1940–1941. Made Hero of the Soviet Union, 1940; awarded Order of Victory, 1945.
18	Lavrentiy Beria		9 Jul 1945	Deputy Chairman, Council of People's Commissars/People's Commissar for Internal Affairs, 1941–1946.; Deputy Chairman, Council of Ministers, 1946–1953.; First Deputy Chairman, Council of Ministers/Minister of Internal Affairs, 1953.	Yes (17th–19th)	No	Yes (18th–19th) (Note: Candidate member of the 18th Politburo until promotion at the 8th Plenary Session (18 March 1946))	8	(1899–1953) (Note: Unofficial rank of Commissar General of State Security converted to Marshal of the Soviet Union, 9 July 1945; arrested and removed from all offices, 26 June 1953; stripped of rank, 18 December 1953; executed, 23 December 1953.) Stripped of rank, 1953. First Secretary, Communist Party of Georgia, 1931–1932, 1934–1938; First Secretary, Communist Party, Transcaucasian SFSR, 1932–1938. Made Hero of Socialist Labour, 1943.
19	Vasily Sokolovsky		3 Jul 1946	Commander in Chief, Soviet Military Administration in Germany/Commander in Chief, Group of Soviet Occupation Forces in Germany, 1946–1949.; First Deputy Minister of War, 1949–1952. (Note: as First Deputy Minister of the Armed Forces (1949–1950)); First Deputy Minister of Defence/Chief, General Staff of the Soviet Armed Forces, 1952–1960. (Note: as First Deputy Minister of War (1952–1953))	Yes (Full: 19th–20th; Candidate: 22nd–23rd)	No	No	14	(1897–1968) Appointed to Group of Inspectors General, 1960. Made Hero of the Soviet Union, 1945.
20	Nikolai Bulganin		3 Nov 1947	Deputy Chairman, Council of Ministers/Minister of the Armed Forces, 1947–1949.; Deputy Chairman, Council of Ministers, 1949–1950.; First Deputy Chairman, Council of Ministers, 1950–1953.; First Deputy Chairman, Council of Ministers/Minister of Defence, 1953–1955. (Note: as Minister of War (5–15 March 1953)); Chairman, Council of Ministers, 1955–1958.; Chairman of the Board, State Bank of the Soviet Union, 1958.; Chairman, Regional Economic Council, 1958.	Yes (17th–20th) (Note: Candidate member of the 17th Central Committee until promotion at the 12th Plenary Session (12 October 1937))	No	Yes (18th–20th) (Note: Candidate member of the 18th Politburo until promotion by poll (18 February 1948))	11	(1895–1975) (Note: Resigned as premier, 27 March 1958; expelled from Presidium, 5 September 1958; stripped of rank, 20 November 1958; retired, 14 October 1961.) Stripped of rank, 1958. Chairman, Council of People's Commissars, Russian SFSR, 1937–1938; Deputy Chairman, Council of People's Commissars, 1938–1944; Chairman of the Board, State Bank of the Soviet Union, 1938–1940, 1940–1945. Made Hero of Socialist Labour, 1955.
21	Andrei Grechko		11 Mar 1955	Commander in Chief, Group of Soviet Forces in Germany, 1954–1957.; First Deputy Minister of Defence/Commander in Chief, Soviet Ground Forces, 1957–1960.; First Deputy Minister of Defence/Supreme Commander, Unified Armed Forces of the Warsaw Treaty Organization, 1960–1967.; Minister of Defence, 1967–1976.	Yes (Candidate: 19th–20th; Full: 22nd–25th)	No	Yes (24th–25th)	21	(1903–1976) Died in office. Made Hero of the Soviet Union, 1958 and 1973.
22	Ivan Bagramyan		11 Mar 1955	Deputy Minister of Defence/Chief Inspector, Ministry of Defence, 1954–1955.; Commandant, Military Academy of the General Staff of the Soviet Armed Forces, 1956–1958.; Deputy Minister of Defence/Chief, Rear Services of the Soviet Armed Forces, 1958–1968.	Yes (Candidate: 19th–20th; Full: 22nd–26th)	No	No	13	(1897–1982) Appointed to Group of Inspectors General, 1968. Made Hero of the Soviet Union, 1944 and 1977.
23	Sergey Biryuzov		11 Mar 1955	Deputy Minister of Defence/Commander in Chief, Soviet Air Defence Forces, 1955–1962.; Deputy Minister of Defence/Commander in Chief, Strategic Rocket Forces, 1962–1963.; First Deputy Minister of Defence/Chief, General Staff of the Soviet Armed Forces, 1963–1964.	Yes (Candidate: 20th; Full: 22nd)	No	No	9	(1904–1964) Died in office. Made Hero of the Soviet Union, 1958.
24	Kirill Moskalenko		11 Mar 1955	Commander, Moscow Military District, 1953–1960.; Deputy Minister of Defence/Commander in Chief, Strategic Rocket Forces, 1960–1962.; Deputy Minister of Defence/Chief Inspector, Ministry of Defence, 1962–1983.	Yes (20th–26th)	No	No	28	(1902–1985) Appointed to Group of Inspectors General, 1983. Made Hero of the Soviet Union, 1943 and 1978.
25	Vasily Chuikov		11 Mar 1955	Commander, Kiev Military District, 1953–1960.; Deputy Minister of Defence/Commander in Chief, Soviet Ground Forces, 1960–1961.; Deputy Minister of Defence/Commander in Chief, Soviet Ground Forces/Chief, Civil Defence, 1961–1964.; Deputy Minister of Defence/Chief, Civil Defence, 1964–1972.	Yes (Candidate: 20th; Full: 22nd–26th)	No	No	17	(1900–1982) Appointed to Group of Inspectors General, 1972. Commander in Chief, Group of Soviet Occupation Forces in Germany, 1949–1953. Made Hero of the Soviet Union, 1944 and 1945.
26	Andrey Yeryomenko		11 Mar 1955	Commander, North Caucasus Military District, 1953–1958.	Yes (Candidate: 20th, 23rd; Full: 22nd)	No	No	3	(1892–1970) Appointed to Group of Inspectors General, 1958. Made Hero of the Soviet Union, 1944.
27	Matvei Zakharov		8 May 1959	Commander in Chief, Group of Soviet Forces in Germany, 1957–1960.; First Deputy Minister of Defence/Chief, General Staff of the Soviet Armed Forces, 1960–1963.; Commandant, Military Academy of the General Staff of the Soviet Armed Forces, 1963–1964.; First Deputy Minister of Defence/Chief, General Staff of the Soviet Armed Forces, 1964–1971.	Yes (22nd–24th)	No	No	12	(1898–1972) Appointed to Group of Inspectors General, 1971. Made Hero of the Soviet Union, 1945 and 1971. Director, Main Intelligence Directorate, 1949–1952.
28	Filipp Golikov		6 May 1961	Chief, Main Political Directorate of the Soviet Army and Soviet Navy, 1958–1962.	Yes (22nd)	No	No	1	(1900–1980) Relieved and appointed to Group of Inspectors General, 1962. Director, Main Intelligence Directorate, 1940–1941.
29	Nikolay Krylov		28 Apr 1962	Commander, Moscow Military District, 1960–1963.; Deputy Minister of Defence/Commander in Chief, Strategic Rocket Forces, 1963–1972.	Yes (22nd–24th)	No	No	10	(1903–1972) Died in office. Made Hero of the Soviet Union, twice in 1945.
30	Ivan Yakubovsky		12 Apr 1967	First Deputy Minister of Defence/Supreme Commander of the Unified Armed Forces of the Warsaw Treaty Organization, 1967–1976.	Yes (22nd–25th)	No	No	9	(1912–1976) Died in office. Commander in Chief, Group of Soviet Forces in Germany, 1960–1961; 1962–1965. Made Hero of the Soviet Union, twice in 1944.
31	Pavel Batitsky		15 Apr 1968	Deputy Minister of Defence/Commander in Chief, Soviet Air Defence Forces, 1966–1978.	Yes (Candidate: 22nd; Full: 23rd–26th)	No	No	10	(1910–1984) Appointed to Group of Inspectors General, 1978. Made Hero of the Soviet Union, 1965.
32	Pyotr Koshevoy		15 Apr 1968	Commander in Chief, Group of Soviet Forces in Germany, 1965–1969.	Candidate (22nd–23rd)	No	No	1	(1904–1976) Appointed to Group of Inspectors General, 1969. Made Hero of the Soviet Union, 1944 and 1945.
33	Leonid Brezhnev		7 May 1976	General Secretary, Central Committee of the Communist Party of the Soviet Union, 1964–1982. (Note: as First Secretary, Central Committee of the Communist Party of the Soviet Union (1964–1966)); Chairman, Defence Council of the Soviet Union, 1964–1982.; Chairman, Presidium of the Supreme Soviet, 1977–1982.	Yes (19th–26th)	Yes (19th–26th)	Yes (Candidate: 19th; Full: 20th–26th)	6	(1906–1982) Died in office. First Secretary, Communist Party of Moldavia, 1950–1952; First Secretary, Communist Party of Kazakhstan, 1955–1956; Chairman, Presidium of the Supreme Soviet, 1960–1964; Second Secretary, Communist Party of the Soviet Union, 1963–1964. Made Hero of the Soviet Union, 1966, 1976, 1978 and 1981; Hero of Socialist Labour, 1961; awarded Order of Victory, 1978 (rescinded 1989).
34	Dmitry Ustinov		30 Jul 1976	Minister of Defence, 1976–1984.	Yes (19th–26th)	Yes (22nd–25th)	Yes (Candidate: 22nd–24th; Full: 25th–26th)	8	(1908–1984) (Note: Directly appointed as General of the Army, 29 April 1976; promoted to Marshal of the Soviet Union, 30 July 1976.) Died in office. Minister of the Defence Industry, 1941–1957; (Note: as People's Commissar for Armaments (1941–1946); Minister of Armaments (1946–1953)) Deputy Chairman, Council of Ministers, 1957–1963; First Deputy Chairman, Council of Ministers, 1963–1965; CPSU Central Committee Secretary for Administrative Organs, 1963–1976; for the Defence Industry, 1965–1976. Made Hero of Socialist Labour, 1942 and 1961; Hero of the Soviet Union, 1978.
35	Viktor Kulikov		14 Jan 1977	First Deputy Minister of Defence/Supreme Commander, Unified Armed Forces of the Warsaw Treaty Organization, 1977–1989.	Yes (24th–27th)	No	No	12	(1921–2013) Relieved, 1989. Commander in Chief, Group of Soviet Forces in Germany, 1969–1971; Chief, General Staff of the Soviet Armed Forces, 1971–1977; Member of the State Duma, 2000–2003. Made Hero of the Soviet Union, 1981.
36	Nikolai Ogarkov		14 Jan 1977	First Deputy Minister of Defence/Chief, General Staff of the Soviet Armed Forces, 1977–1984.; Commander in Chief, Western Theatre of Military Operations, 1984–1988.	Yes (Candidate: 23rd; Full: 24th–28th)	No	No	11	(1917–1994) Relieved as chief of the general staff, 1984; appointed to Group of Inspectors General, 1988. Made Hero of the Soviet Union, 1977.
37	Sergei Sokolov		17 Feb 1978	First Deputy Minister of Defence, 1966–1984.; Minister of Defence, 1984–1987.	Yes (23rd–27th) (Note: Candidate member of the 23rd Central Committee until promotion at the 7th Plenary Session (9–10 April 1968))	No	Candidate (26th–27th)	9	(1911–2012) Dismissed as minister of defence, 1987. Made Hero of the Soviet Union, 1980.
38	Sergey Akhromeyev		25 Mar 1983	First Deputy Chief, General Staff of the Soviet Armed Forces, 1979–1984.; First Deputy Minister of Defence/Chief, General Staff of the Soviet Armed Forces, 1984–1988.	Yes (26th–27th) (Note: Candidate member of the 26th Central Committee until promotion at the 6th Plenary Session (14–15 June 1983))	No	No	5	(1923–1991) Appointed to Group of Inspectors General, 1988. Made Hero of the Soviet Union, 1982.
39	Semyon Kurkotkin		25 Mar 1983	Deputy Minister of Defence/Chief, Rear Services of the Soviet Armed Forces, 1972–1988.	Yes (Candidate: 24th; Full: 25th–27th)	No	No	5	(1917–1990) Appointed to Group of Inspectors General, 1988. Commander in Chief, Group of Soviet Forces in Germany, 1971–1972. Made Hero of the Soviet Union, 1981.
40	Vasily Petrov		25 Mar 1983	Deputy Minister of Defence/Commander in Chief, Soviet Ground Forces, 1980–1985.; First Deputy Minister of Defence, 1985–1986.	Yes (25th–27th)	No	No	3	(1917–2014) Appointed to Group of Inspectors General, 1986. Made Hero of the Soviet Union, 1982.
41	Dmitry Yazov		28 Apr 1990	Minister of Defence, 1987–1991.; Member, State Committee on the State of Emergency, 1991.	Yes (Candidate: 26th; Full: 27th–28th) (Note: Candidate member of the 27th Central Committee until promotion at the 4th Plenary Session (26 June 1987))	No	Candidate (27th)	1	(1924–2020) Dismissed as minister of defence, 1991.

== See also ==
- Marshal of the Russian Federation
- History of Russian military ranks
- Military ranks of the Soviet Union
  - 1935–1940 and 1940–1943
  - 1943–1955 and 1955–1991
- Marshal of the branch
- Chief marshal of the branch
- Admiral of the Fleet of the Soviet Union
- Field marshal (Russian Empire)
- Marshal of the People's Republic of China
- Marshal (North Korea and South Korea)

== Bibliography ==
- Erickson, John (2001) [1962]. The Soviet High Command: A Military-Political History, 1918–1941 (PDF). CASS Series on Soviet (Russian) Military Institutions. Frank Cass Publishers. ISBN 978-0415408608.
- Gebhardt, James (1989). "The Petsamo-Kirkenes Operation: Soviet Breakthrough and Pursuit in the Arctic, October 1944" (PDF). Leavenworth Papers (17).
- Grachev, Pavel, ed. (1994). "Выстрел" [Vystrel]. Военная энциклопедия в 8 томах [Military Encyclopedia in 8 volumes] (in Russian). Vol. 2. Moscow: Voenizdat. ISBN 5-203-00299-1.
- Huskey, Eugene, ed. (1992). Executive Power and Soviet Politics: The Rise and Decline of the Soviet State. M.E. Sharpe. ISBN 978-1563240607.
- Karlsson, Håkan (1988). "The Defense Council of the USSR". Cooperation and Conflict. 23 (2): 69–83. doi:10.1177/001083678802300202. JSTOR 45084370.
- Manninen, Ohto (2004). The Soviet Plans for the North Western Theatre of Operations in 1939–1944 (PDF). Finnish Defence Studies. National Defence College, Helsinki. p. 111.
- Naab, Richard (May 1977). Victor G. Kulikov, Marshal of the Soviet Union: A Dimming Red Star? (PDF) (Thesis). Garmisch, Germany: U.S. Army Institute for Advanced Russian and East European Studies.
- Pierre, André (September 1955). "The Army and the Party in the Soviet Union". Quarterly Review of Military Literature. 35 (6) – via Google Books.
- Sadykiewicz, Michael (1982). "Soviet Far East High Command: A New Development Factor in the USSR Military Strategy Towards East Asia". Asian Perspectives. 6 (2). JSTOR 43737988.
- Sadykiewicz, Michael (August 1987). "Soviet-Warsaw Pact Western Theater of Military Operations: Organization and Missions" (PDF). RAND Corporation.
- Shukman, Harold (1997) [1993]. Stalin's Generals. London: Phoenix Giants. ISBN 978-0802114877.
- Spahr, William (4 July 1972). "The Soviet Military Decisionmaking Process". Parameters. 2 (1). USAWC Press. doi:10.55540/0031-1723.1048.
- Tyushkevich, Stepan Andreevich (1978). The Soviet Armed Forces: A History of Their Organizational Development, A Soviet View (translated) (PDF). Translated by CIS Multilingual Section, Translation Bureau, Canadian Department of External Affairs. Moscow: U.S. Government Publishing Office.
- Warner, Edward; Bonan, Josephine; Packman, Erma (April 1987). "Key Personnel and Organizations of the Soviet Military High Command" (PDF). RAND Corporation.
- Ziemke, Earl Frederick; Bauer, Magna E. (1987). Moscow to Stalingrad: Decision in the East. U.S. Government Printing Office. ISBN 978-0-16-080081-8.
