= Central Committee of the 19th Congress of the Communist Party of the Soviet Union =

The Central Committee of the 19th Congress of the Communist Party of the Soviet Union (CPSU) was in session from 1952 until 1956. It elected, at its 1st Plenary Session, the Presidium, the Secretariat and the Party Control Committee.

== Plenums ==
The CC was not a permanent institution. The CC was convened for 11 plenary sessions between the 19th Congress and the 20th Congress. When the CC was not in session, decision-making powers were transferred to inner bodies of the CC itself; the Politburo and Secretariat (none of these bodies were permanent either, but convened to decide on crucial matters).

Plenary sessions of the Central Committee
Plenum	Date	Length
1st Plenary Session	16 October 1952	1 day
2nd Plenary Session	5 March 1953	1 day
3rd Plenary Session	14 March 1953	1 day
4th Plenary Session	2–7 July 1953	6 days
5th Plenary Session	3–7 September 1953	5 days
6th Plenary Session	23 February – 2 March 1954	8 days
7th Plenary Session	21–24 June 1954	4 days
8th Plenary Session	25–31 January 1955	7 days
9th Plenary Session	3–8 March 1955	6 days
10th Plenary Session	4–12 July 1955	9 days
11th Plenary Session	13 February 1956	1 day

== Composition ==
=== Members ===
Members of the Central Committee of the 19th Congress of the Communist Party of the Soviet Union
Name	Cyrillic	18th CC	20th CC	Birth	Death	PM	Ethnicity	Gender
Andrey Andreyev	Андрей Андреев	Old	Reelected	1895	1971	1914	Russian	Male
Vasily Andrianov	Василий Андрианов	Old	Not	1902	1978	1926	Russian	Male
Averky Aristov	Аверкий Аристов	New	Reelected	1903	1973	1921	Russian	Male
Grigory Arutinov	Григорий Арутинов	Candidate	Removed	1900	1957	1919	Armenian	Male
Sukhan Babayev	Сухан Бабаев	New	Reelected	1910	1995	1939	Turkmen	Male
Mir Jafar Baghirov	Мир Джафар Багиров	Old	Removed	1896	1956	1917	Azerbaijani	Male
Nikolai Baibakov	Николай Байбаков	New	Reelected	1911	2008	1939	Russian	Male
Nikolai Belyaev	Николай Беляев	New	Reelected	1903	1966	1921	Russian	Male
Ivan Benediktov	Иван Бенедиктов	Candidate	Reelected	1902	1983	1930	Russian	Male
Lavrentiy Beria	Лаврентий Берия	Old	Removed	1899	1953	1917	Georgian	Male
Boris Beschev	Борис Бещев	New	Reelected	1903	1981	1927	Russian	Male
Gennady Borkov	Геннадий Борков	Old	Not	1905	1983	1924	Russian	Male
Ivan Boytsov	Иван Бойцов	Candidate	Reelected	1896	1988	1919	Russian	Male
Leonid Brezhnev	Леонид Брежнев	New	Reelected	1906	1982	1931	Russian	Male
Nikolai Bulganin	Николай Булганин	Old	Reelected	1895	1975	1917	Russian	Male
Pyotr Cheplakov	Пётр Чеплаков	New	Candidate	1906	1985	1927	Russian	Male
Vasily Chernyshev	Василий Чернышёв	New	Not	1908	1969	1928	Russian	Male
Dmitry Chesnokov	Дмитрий Чесноков	New	Not	1910	1973	1939	Russian	Male
Georgy Denisov	Георгий Денисов	New	Reelected	1909	1996	1928	Russian	Male
Alexander Efimov	Александр Ефимов	New	Not	1905	1980	1927	Russian	Male
Leonid Efimov	Леонид Ефремов	New	Not	1912	2007	1941	Russian	Male
Alexander Fadeyev	Александр Фадеев	Old	Candidate	1901	1956	1918	Russian	Male
Bobojon Ghafurov	Бободжан Гафуров	New	Reelected	1908	1977	1932	Tajik	Male
Fodor Goryachev	Фёдор Горячев	New	Reelected	1905	1996	1927	Russian	Male
Ivan Grishin	Иван Гришин	New	Reelected	1911	1985	1931	Russian	Male
Viktor Grishin	Ви́ктор Гри́шин	New	Reelected	1914	1992	1939	Russian	Male
Teymur Guliyev	Теймур Кулиев	New	Not	1888	1965	1920	Azerbaijani	Male
Mikhail Gusev	Михаил Гусев	New	Not	1903	1979	1939	Russian	Male
Nikolai Ignatov	Никола́й Игна́тов	Old	Reelected	1901	1966	1924	Russian	Male
Semyon Ignatyev	Семён Игнатьев	New	Reelected	1904	1983	1924	Ukrainian	Male
Ivan Kabanov	Иван Кабанов	New	Reelected	1897	1972	1917	Russian	Male
Johannes Käbin	Йоха́ннес Кэ́бин	New	Reelected	1905	1999	1927	Estonian	Male
Lazar Kaganovich	Лазарь Каганович	Old	Reelected	1893	1991	1911	Russian	Male
Jānis Kalnbērziņš	Ян Калнбе́рзинь	Candidate	Not	1893	1986	1917	Latvian	Male
Ivan Kapitonov	Иван Капитонов	New	Reelected	1915	2002	1939	Russian	Male
Zakhariy Ketskhoveli	Захарий Кецховели	New	Not	1902	1970	1941	Georgian	Male
Nikita Khrushchev	Никита Хрущёв	Old	Reelected	1894	1971	1918	Russian	Male
Aleksey Khvorostukhin	Алексей Хворостухин	New	Reelected	1900	1985	1924	Ukrainian	Male
Aleksandr Kidin	Александр Кидин	New	Not	1909	1959	1930	Russian	Male
Aleksey Kirichenko	Алексе́й Кириче́нко	New	Reelected	1908	1975	1930	Ukrainian	Male
Nikolai Kiselov	Николай Киселёв	New	Not	1903	1983	1925	Russian	Male
Viktor Kiselov	Виктор Киселёв	New	Not	1907	1979	1928	Russian	Male
Ivan Konev	Иван Конев	Candidate	Reelected	1897	1973	1918	Russian	Male
Pavel Korchagin	Павел Корчагин	New	Not	1901	1980	1928	Russian	Male
Oleksandr Korniychuk	Александр Корнейчук	New	Reelected	1905	1972	1940	Ukrainian	Male
Demyan Korotchenko	Демьян Коротченко	Old	Reelected	1894	1969	1918	Ukrainian	Male
Alexei Kosygin	Алексей Косыгин	Old	Reelected	1904	1980	1927	Russian	Male
Maria Kovrigina	Мария Ковригина	New	Reelected	1910	1995	1931	Russian	Female
Frol Kozlov	Фрол Козлов	New	Reelected	1908	1965	1926	Russian	Male
Sergei Kruglov	Сергей Круглов	Old	Not	1907	1977	1928	Russian	Male
Mikhail Krunichev	Михаил Хруничев	New	Not	1901	1961	1921	Russian	Male
Aleksey Kutyrov	Алексей Кутырёв	New	Not	1902	1969	1928	Russian	Male
Otto Kuusinen	Отто Куусинен	Old	Reelected	1881	1964	1918	Finn	Male
Vasily Kuznetsov	Василий Кузнецов	New	Reelected	1901	1990	1927	Russian	Male
Nikolay Kuznetsov	Николай Кузнецов	Old	Not	1904	1974	1925	Russian	Male
Aleksey Larionov	Алексей Ларионов	New	Reelected	1907	1960	1927	Russian	Male
Ivan Latunov	Иван Латунов	New	Reelected	1906	1970	1930	Russian	Male
Ivan Lebedev	Иван Лебедев	New	Not	1907	1972	1928	Russian	Male
Vladimir Lukyanov	Владимир Лукьянов	New	Reelected	1901	1958	1927	Russian	Male
Georgy Malenkov	Георги Маленков	Old	Reelected	1902	1988	1920	Russian	Male
Vyacheslav Malyshev	Вячеслав Малышев	Old	Reelected	1902	1957	1926	Russian	Male
Aleksey Marfin	Алексей Марфин	New	Not	1912	?	1932	Russian	Male
Lev Mekhlis	Лев Мехлис	Old	Died	1889	1953	1918	Ukrainian	Male
Dmitry Melnik	Дмитрий Мельник	New	Not	1912	1969	1937	Russian	Male
Leonid Melnikov	Леонид Мельников	New	Candidate	1906	1981	1928	Ukrainian	Male
Akaky Mgeladze	Акакий Мгеладзе	New	Not	1910	1980	1932	Georgian	Male
Nikolai Mikhailov	Николай Михайлов	Old	Reelected	1906	1982	1930	Russian	Male
Anastas Mikoyan	Анастас Микоян	Old	Reelected	1895	1978	1915	Armenian	Male
Mark Mitin	Марк Митин	Old	Reelected	1901	1987	1919	Ukrainian	Male
Vyacheslav Molotov	Вячеслав Молотов	Old	Reelected	1890	1986	1906	Russian	Male
Vasily Moskvin	Василий Москвин	New	Reelected	1910	1969	1932	Russian	Male
Nuritdin Mukhitdinov	Нуритди́н Мухитди́нов	New	Reelected	1917	2008	1942	Uzbek	Male
Zinnat Muratov	Зиннят Муратов	New	Reelected	1906	1988	1930	Tatar	Male
Viktor Nedosekin	Виктор Недосекин	New	Not	1908	1976	1930	Russian	Male
Boris Nikolayev	Борис Николаев	New	Not	1907	1973	1928	Russian	Male
Amin Niyazov	Амин Ниязов	New	Not	1903	1973	1925	Uzbek	Male
Nikolay Organov	Николай Органов	New	Reelected	1901	1982	1925	Russian	Male
Anna Pankratova	Анна Панкратова	New	Reelected	1897	1957	1919	Ukrainian	Female
Nikolai Patolichev	Николай Патоличев	Old	Reelected	1908	1989	1928	Russian	Male
Nikolai Pegov	Николай Пегов	Old	Reelected	1905	1991	1930	Russian	Male
Mikhail Pervukhin	Михаил Первухин	Old	Reelected	1904	1978	1919	Russian	Male
Panteleimon Ponomarenko	Пантелеймон Пономаренко	Old	Reelected	1902	1984	1925	Ukrainian	Male
Alexander Poskrebyshev	Александр Поскрёбышев	Old	Not	1891	1965	1917	Russian	Male
Pyotr Pospelov	Пётр Поспелов	Old	Reelected	1898	1979	1916	Russian	Male
Filipp Prass	Филипп Прасс	New	Not	1909	1965	1928	Russian	Male
Vasily Prokofiev	Василий Прокофьев	New	Reelected	1906	1996	1929	Russian	Male
Vasily Pronin	Василий Пронин	Old	Not	1905	1993	1925	Russian	Male
Alexander Puzanov	Александр Пузанов	New	Reelected	1906	1998	1925	Russian	Male
Iskhak Razzakov	Исхак Раззаков	New	Reelected	1910	1979	1940	Kyrgyz	Male
Aleksey Rumyantsev	Алексей Румянцев	New	Reelected	1905	1993	1940	Russian	Male
Maksim Saburov	Макси́м Сабу́ров	New	Reelected	1900	1977	1920	Russian	Male
Aleksey Semin	Алексей Сёмин	New	Not	1910	1972	1929	Russian	Male
Nikolay Shatalin	Николай Шаталин	Promoted	Not	1904	1980	1925	Russian	Male
Zhumabay Shayakhmetov	Жумабай Шаяхметов	New	Not	1902	1966	1940	Kazakh	Male
Alexander Shelepin	Алекса́ндр Шеле́пин	New	Reelected	1918	1994	1940	Russian	Male
Dmitri Shepilov	Дми́трий Шепи́лов	New	Reelected	1905	1995	1926	Russian	Male
Matvei Shkiryatov	Матвей Шкирятов	Old	Died	1883	1954	1906	Russian	Male
Nikolai Shvernik	Никола́й Шве́рник	Old	Reelected	1888	1970	1905	Russian	Male
Dmitry Smirnov	Дмитрий Смирнов	New	Not	1908	1965	1928	Russian	Male
Antanas Sniečkus	Антанас Снечкус	Candidate	Reelected	1903	1974	1920	Lithuanian	Male
Vasily Sokolovsky	Василий Соколовский	New	Reelected	1897	1968	1931	Belarusian	Male
Joseph Stalin	Иосиф Сталин	Old	Died	1878	1953	1898	Georgian	Male
Mikhail Suslov	Михаил Суслов	Old	Reelected	1902	1982	1921	Russian	Male
Elubaj Taybekov	Елубай Тайбеков	New	Not	1901	1991	1926	Kazakh	Male
Ivan Tevosian	Иван Тевосян	Old	Reelected	1902	1958	1918	Armenian	Male
Fedor Titov	Фёдор Титов	New	Reelected	1910	1989	1930	Tatar	Male
Pavel Titov	Павел Титов	New	Not	1907	1990	1926	Russian	Male
Dmitriy Ustinov	Дми́трий Усти́нов	New	Reelected	1908	1984	1927	Russian	Male
Sabir Vagapov	Сабир Вагапов	New	Not	1904	1993	1926	Russian	Male
Boris Vannikov	Борис Ванников	Old	Reelected	1897	1962	1919	Russian	Male
Aleksandr Vasilevsky	Александр Василевский	New	Reelected	1895	1977	1938	Russian	Male
Ivan Volkov	Иван Волков	New	Not	1906	1975	1925	Russian	Male
Gennady Voronov	Геннадий Воронов	New	Reelected	1910	1994	1931	Russian	Male
Kliment Voroshilov	Климент Ворошилов	Old	Reelected	1881	1969	1903	Russian	Male
Andrey Vyshinsky	Андрей Вышинский	Old	Died	1883	1954	1920	Russian	Male
Ivan Yakovlev	Иван Яковлев	New	Reelected	1901	1966	1928	Russian	Male
Mikhail Yasnov	Михаил Яснов	New	Reelected	1906	1991	1925	Russian	Male
Alexander Yegorov	Александр Егоров	New	Not	1904	1988	1921	Russian	Male
Pavel Yudin	Павел Юдин	New	Reelected	1899	1968	1918	Russian	Male
Usman Yusupov	Усман Юсупов	Old	Not	1901	1966	1926	Uzbek	Male
Alexander Zasyadko	Александр Засядько	New	Not	1910	1963	1931	Ukrainian	Male
Yuri Zhdanov	Юрий Жданов	New	Not	1919	2006	1944	Russian	Male
Ivan Zhegalin	Иван Жегалин	New	Reelected	1906	1984	1926	Russian	Male
Georgy Zhukov	Георгий Жуков	Promoted	Reelected	1896	1974	1919	Russian	Male
Konstantin Zhukov	Константин Жуков	New	Candidate	1906	1988	1936	Ukrainian	Male
Mikhail Zimyanin	Михаил Зимянин	New	Not	1914	1995	1939	Belarusian	Male
Arseny Zverev	Арсений Зверев	Old	Reelected	1900	1969	1919	Russian	Male

=== Candidates ===
Candidate Members of the Central Committee of the 19th Congress of the Communist Party of the Soviet Union
Name	Cyrillic	18th CC	20th CC	Birth	Death	PM	Ethnicity	Gender
Timofey Akhazov	Тимофей Ахазов	New	Not	1907	1979	1927	Chuvash	Male
Georgy Aleksandrov	Георгий Александров	Candidate	Not	1908	1961	1928	Russian	Male
Gennady Aleksenko	Геннадий Алексенко	New	Not	1906	1981	1940	Russian	Male
Pavel Artemyev	Павел Артемьев	New	Not	1897	1979	1920	Russian	Male
Ivan Bagramyan	Иван Баграмян	New	Candidate	1897	1982	1941	Armenian	Male
Valerian Bakradze	Валериан Бакрадзе	Candidate	Removed	1901	1971	1921	Georgian	Male
Nikolay Basistyy	Николай Басистый	New	Not	1898	1971	1919	Ukrainian	Male
Semyon Bogdanov	Семён Богданов	New	Not	1894	1960	1942	Russian	Male
Alexei Bondarenko	Алексей Бондаренко	New	Not	1911	1956	1932	Russian	Male
Semyon Borisov	Семён Борисов	New	Candidate	1911	1999	1932	Yakut	Male
Semyon Budyonny	Семён Будённый	Member	Candidate	1883	1973	1919	Russian	Male
Sergey Butuzov	Сергей Бутузов	New	Candidate	1909	1967	1939	Russian	Male
Vasily Chuikov	Василий Чуйков	New	Candidate	1900	1982	1919	Russian	Male
Gavriil Chumachenko	Гавриил Чумаченко	New	Not	1903	1970	1928	Russian	Male
Abdurakhman Daniyalov	Абдурахман Даниялов	New	Not	1908	1981	1928	Avar	Male
Pyotr Dementev	Пётр Дементьев	New	Member	1907	1977	1938	Russian	Male
Boris Dvinsky	Борис Двинский	New	Not	1894	1973	1920	Russian	Male
Nikolay Dygay	Николай Дыгай	New	Candidate	1908	1963	1929	Russian	Male
Dmitry Efremov	Дмитрий Ефремов	New	Not	1900	1960	1943	Russian	Male
Aleksandr Fodorov	Александр Фёдоров	New	Not	1909	1986	1929	Russian	Male
Yekaterina Furtseva	Екатерина Фурцева	New	Member	1910	1974	1930	Russian	Female
Mečislovas Gedvilas	Мечисловас Гедвилас	New	Not	1901	1981	1934	Lithuanian	Male
Sergo Goglidze	Сергей Гоглидзе	Candidate	Removed	1901	1953	1919	Georgian	Male
Alexander Gorbatov	Александр Горбатов	New	Candidate	1891	1973	1919	Russian	Male
Konstantin Gorshenin	Константин Горшенин	New	Not	1907	1978	1930	Russian	Male
Leonid Govorov	Леонид Говоров	New	Died	1897	1955	1942	Russian	Male
Andrei Grechko	Андре́й Гре́чко	New	Candidate	1903	1976	1928	Ukrainian	Male
Vagan Grigoryan	Ваган Григорьян	New	Removed	1902	1983	1920	Russian	Male
Andrei Gromyko	Андрей Громыко	New	Member	1909	1989	1931	Belarusian	Male
Leonid Illichev	Леонид Ильичёв	New	Not	1906	1990	1924	Russian	Male
Ivan Kairov	Иван Каиров	New	Not	1893	1978	1917	Russian	Male
Nikifor Kalchenko	Никифор Кальченко	New	Member	1906	1989	1932	Ukrainian	Male
Mikhail Kanunnikov	Михаил Канунников	New	Candidate	1902	1984	1926	Russian	Male
Nikolay Kazakov	Николай Казаков	New	Not	1900	1970	1923	Russian	Male
Aleksandr Khakhalov	Александр Хахалов	New	Candidate	1909	1970	1929	Buryat	Male
Ivan Khokhlov	Иван Хохлов	Candidate	Not	1895	1973	1918	Russian	Male
Bogdan Kobulov	Богдан Кобулов	Candidate	Not	1902	1953	1925	Armenian	Male
Pavel Komarov	Павел Комаров	Candidate	Candidate	1898	1983	1920	Russian	Male
Leonid Korniyets	Леонид Корниец	Member	Candidate	1901	1969	1926	Ukrainian	Male
Anatoly Kostousov	Анатолий Костоусов	New	Candidate	1906	1985	1925	Russian	Male
Aleksey Kozlov	Алексей Козлов	New	Removed	1911	1982	1939	Russian	Male
Kubadi Kulov	Кубади Кулов	New	Not	1907	1980	1927	Ossetian	Male
Pavel Kumykin	Павел Кумыкин	New	Candidate	1901	1976	1927	Russian	Male
Fyodor Kuznetsov	Фёдор Кузнецов	New	Not	1906	1989	1926	Russian	Male
Klavdiya Kuznetsova	Клавдия Кузнецова	New	Not	1916	1998	1939	Russian	Female
Vilis Lācis	Вилис Лацис	New	Candidate	1904	1966	1928	Latvian	Male
Pavel Ladonov	Пётр Ладанов	New	Not	1904	1989	1928	Russian	Male
Pyotr Lomako	Пётр Лома́ко	New	Candidate	1904	1990	1925	Russian	Male
Alexander Luchinsky	Александр Лучинский	New	Candidate	1900	1997	1943	Ukrainian	Male
Lidia Lykova	Лидия Лыкова	New	Candidate	1913	2016	1938	Russian	Female
Yuri Maksarov	Юрий Максарёв	New	Candidate	1903	1982	1921	Russian	Male
Yakov Malik	Яков Малик	New	Candidate	1906	1980	1938	Russian	Male
Mikhail Malinin	Михаил Малинин	New	Not	1899	1960	1931	Russian	Male
Rodion Malinovsky	Родио́н Малино́вский	New	Member	1898	1967	1926	Ukrainian	Male
Fyodor Mamonov	Фёдор Мамонов	New	Not	1907	1985	1926	Russian	Male
Ivan Maslennikov	Иван Масленников	Candidate	Suicide	1900	1964	1924	Russian	Male
Roman Melnikov	Роман Мельников	New	Candidate	1908	1988	1928	Russian	Male
Kirill Meretskov	Кирилл Мерецков	Candidate	Not	1897	1968	1917	Russian	Male
Vsevolod Merkulov	Всеволод Меркулов	Member	Removed	1895	1953	1925	Russian	Male
Aleksei Müürisepp	Алексей Мюрисеп	New	Not	1902	1970	1926	Estonian	Male
Mitrofan Nedelin	Митрофан Неделин	New	Candidate	1902	1960	1924	Russian	Male
Pyotr Niktin	Пётр Никитин	New	Candidate	1909	1959	1930	Russian	Male
Ivan Nosenko	Иван Носенко	Candidate	Candidate	1902	1956	1925	Russian	Male
Georgy Orlov	Георгий Орлов	New	Candidate	1903	1991	1940	Russian	Male
Konstantin Ostrovityanov	Константин Островитянов	New	Candidate	1892	1969	1914	Russian	Male
Justas Paleckis	Юстас Палецкис	New	Candidate	1899	1980	1940	Lithuanian	Male
Alexander Panyushkin	Александр Панюшкин	New	Not	1905	1974	1927	Russian	Male
Pyotr Parshin	Пётр Паршин	New	Not	1899	1970	1928	Russian	Male
Dmitry Pavlov	Дмитрий Павлов	New	Candidate	1905	1991	1926	Russian	Male
Vladimir Pavlov	Владимир Павлов	New	Not	1915	1993	1939	Russian	Male
Alexander Pchelyakov	Александр Пчеляков	New	Candidate	1908	1978	1939	Russian	Male
Maria Pidtychenko	Мария Пидтыченко	New	Not	1912	1991	1939	Russian	Female
Mikhail Pomaznev	Михаил Помазнев	New	Not	1911	1987	1931	Russian	Male
Boris Ponomarev	Борис Пономарёв	New	Member	1905	1995	1919	Russian	Male
Georgy Popov	Георгий Попов	Member	Not	1906	1968	1926	Russian	Male
Sergey Postovalov	Сергей Постовалов	New	Candidate	1906	1968	1930	Russian	Male
David Rayzer	Давид Райзер	New	Candidate	1904	1962	1939	Ukrainian	Male
Sergey Rumyantsev	Сергей Румянцев	New	Not	1906	1969	1929	Russian	Male
Vasily Ryabikov	Василий Рябиков	New	Not	1907	1974	1925	Russian	Male
Vasily Ryasnov	Василий Рясной	New	Not	1904	1995	1926	Ukrainian	Male
Zinovie Serdiuk	Зиновий Сердюк	Candidate	Member	1903	1982	1925	Ukrainian	Male
Ivan Serov	Иван Серов	Candidate	Member	1905	1990	1926	Russian	Male
Zosima Shashkov	Зосима Шашков	New	Candidate	1905	1984	1929	Russian	Male
Nikolay Shatalin	Николай Шаталин	New	Promoted	1904	1980	1925	Russian	Male
Aleksey Shkolnikov	Алексей Школьников	New	Member	1914	2003	1940	Russian	Male
Sergei Shtemenko	Сергей Штеменко	New	Not	1907	1976	1930	Russian	Male
Konstantin Simonov	Константин Симонов	New	Not	1915	1979	1942	Russian	Male
Igor Skulkov	Игорь Скулков	New	Candidate	1913	1971	1932	Russian	Male
Konstantin Sokolev	Константин Соколов	New	Not	1903	1983	1925	Russian	Male
Leonid Solovyov	Леонид Соловьёв	New	Candidate	1906	1993	1929	Russian	Male
Sergey Stepanov	Сергей Степанов	New	Candidate	1906	1976	1928	Russian	Male
Yevgeniya Stepanova	Евгения Степанова	New	Not	1899	1988	1918	Russian	Female
Vsevolod Stoletov	Всеволод Столетов	New	Not	1907	1989	1940	Russian	Male
Sergey Tikhomirov	Сергей Тихомиров	New	Member	1905	1982	1939	Russian	Male
Semyon Timoshenko	Семён Тимошенко	Member	Candidate	1895	1970	1919	Ukrainian	Male
Salchak Toka	Салчак Тока	New	Candidate	1901	1973	1929	Tuvan	Male
Vladimir Tskhovrebashvili	Владимир Цховребашвили	New	Not	1905	1977	1926	Georgian	Male
Vasily Tsyren	Василий Цырень	New	Not	1903	1969	1940	Ukrainian	Male
Zoya Tumanova	Зоя Туманова	New	Candidate	1922	2000	1943	Ukrainian	Female
Konstantin Vershinin	Константин Вершинин	New	Not	1900	1973	1919	Russian	Male
Alexei Yepishev	Алексей Епишев	New	Not	1908	1985	1929	Russian	Male
Pavel Yudin	Павел Юдин	New	Candidate	1902	1956	1928	Russian	Male
Ivan Yumashev	Иван Юмашев	New	Not	1895	1972	1918	Russian	Male
Pyotr Zakharov	Пётр Захаров	New	Not	1905	1974	1929	Russian	Male
Semon Zakharov	Семён Захаров	New	Not	1906	1986	1926	Russian	Male
Georgy Zarubin	Георгий Зарубин	New	Candidate	1900	1958	1919	Russian	Male
Avraami Zavenyagin	Авраамий Завенягин	New	Member	1901	1956	1917	Russian	Male
Vasily Zhavoronkov	Василий Жаворонков	Candidate	Candidate	1906	1987	1929	Russian	Male
Pavel Zhigarev	Павел Жигарев	New	Candidate	1900	1963	1920	Russian	Male
Dmitry Zhimerin	Дмитрий Жимерин	New	Candidate	1906	1995	1928	Russian	Male
Georgy Zhukov	Георгий Жуков	New	Promoted	1896	1974	1919	Russian	Male
