= Olga Ivaschenko =

Ukrainian engineer (1906–1990)

Olga Illivna Ivaschenko (Ukrainian: Ольга Іллівна Іващенко; 30 October [O.S. 12 November] 1906 – 1990) was a Ukrainian electrical engineer and stateswoman. She worked at the Kyiv Electrical Engineering Plant and at an plant in Omsk. Іvaschenko was a candidate member of the 20th Congress of the Central Committee of the Communist Party of the Soviet Union and became a member of the Central Committee of the 22nd Congress of the Communist Party of the Soviet Union. She was also a deputy of the Supreme Soviet of the Soviet Union and the Supreme Soviet of the Ukrainian Soviet Socialist Republic. She was a laureate of the State Stalin Prize, and was awarded three Orders of Lenin, the Order of the Red Banner of Labour and the Order of the Badge of Honour.

== Biography ==
Іvaschenko was born in Odesa on 30 October 1906. She studied at the Faculty of Electrical Engineering of the Kyiv Polytechnic Institute from 1929 to 1933. From 1933, following her graduation from the polytechnic institute, Іvaschenko began working at the Kyiv Electrical Engineering Plant. She held the roles of design engineer, chief designer and chief engineer at the electrical equipment plant. Between 1941 and 1944, Іvaschenko was a chief engineer at a plant in Omsk. She then was the Director of the Tochelektropribor plant of the People's Commissariat - Ministry of Electrical Industry of the USSR in Kyiv.

From 1950, Іvaschenko began a career in politics, having been a member of the Communist Party of the Soviet Union (CPSU) since 1928. She was second secretary of the Kyiv Regional Committee of the Communist Party of Ukraine from 1950 to 1954. Between 25 May 1954 and 8 January 1965, Іvaschenko was the secretary of the Central Committee of the Communist Party of Ukraine. She was a candidate member of the 20th Congress of the Central Committee of the Communist Party of the Soviet Union from 25 February 1956 to 17 October 1961. Іvaschenko was also a candidate member of the 19th Congress of the Central Committee of the Communist Party of Ukraine from 4 December 1957 to 16 February 1960 and was upgraded to become a member of the Central Committee during the 21st Congress from 16 February 1960 to 8 January 1965.

She was made a member of the Central Committee of the 22nd Congress of the Communist Party of the Soviet Union and served in the role between 31 October 1961 and 29 March 1966. Іvaschenko was an deputy of the Soviet of Nationalities of the Supreme Soviet of the Soviet Union of the fourth, fifth and sixth convocations, and of the third, fourth and fifth convocations of the Supreme Soviet of the Ukrainian Soviet Socialist Republic. She retired in 1965 and died in 1990.

== Recognition ==
Іvaschenko was a laureate of the State Stalin Prize in 1951. She was presented with three Orders of Lenin, the Order of the Red Banner of Labour and the Order of the Badge of Honour.
