= 19th Central Committee =

19th Central Committee may refer to:

- Central Committee of the 19th Congress of the Communist Party of the Soviet Union, 1952–1956
- 19th Central Committee of the Chinese Communist Party, 2017–2022
