= 20th Central Committee =

20th Central Committee may refer to:

- Central Committee of the 20th Congress of the Communist Party of the Soviet Union, 1956–1961
- 20th Central Committee of the Chinese Communist Party, 2022–2027
