= Nikolai Bulganin =

Soviet politician (1895–1975)

- Николай Булганин
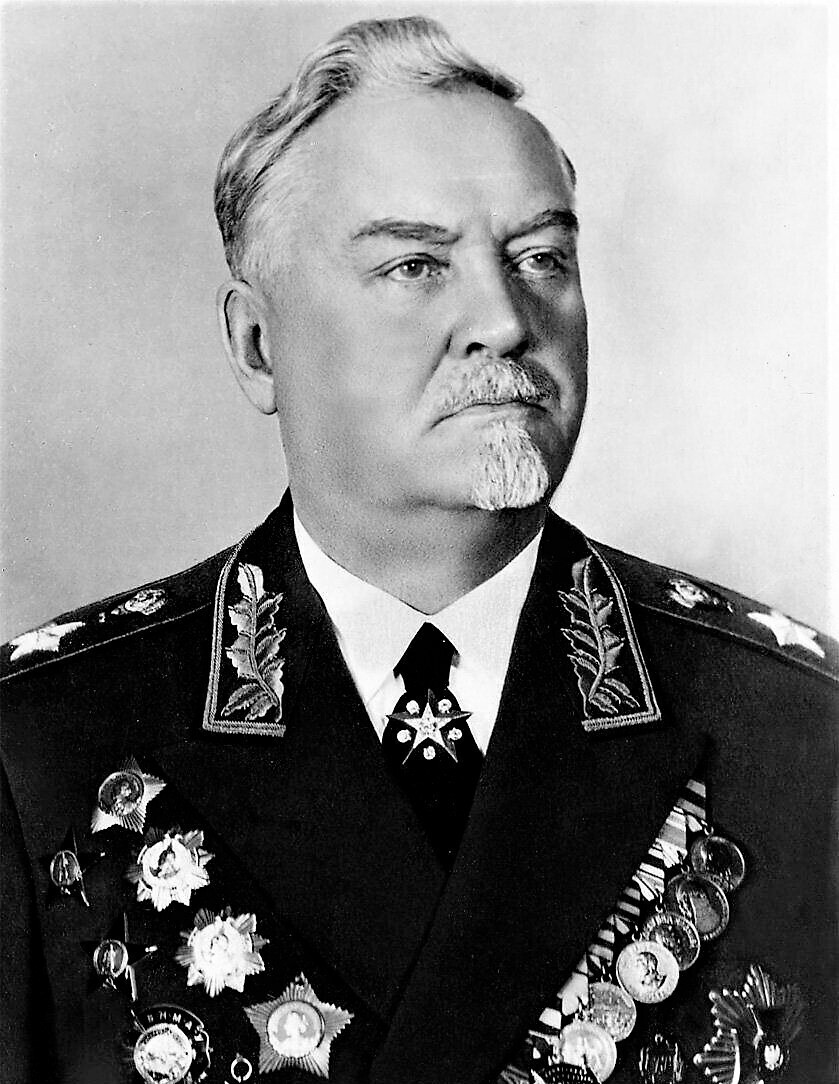
- Bulganin in 1953

Premier of the Soviet Union
- In office 8 February 1955 – 27 March 1958
- President: Kliment Voroshilov
- First Deputies: Anastas Mikoyan; Mikhail Pervukhin; Maksim Saburov; Joseph Kuzmin; Lazar Kaganovich
- Preceded by: Georgy Malenkov
- Succeeded by: Nikita Khrushchev

Minister of Defence of the Soviet Union
- In office 15 March 1953 – 9 February 1955
- Premier: Georgy Malenkov
- Preceded by: Aleksandr Vasilevsky; Nikolai Kuznetsov
- Succeeded by: Georgy Zhukov
Additional positions
First Deputy Premier of the Soviet Union
In office 7 April 1950 – 8 February 1955
Premier	Joseph Stalin; Georgy Malenkov
Preceded by	Vyacheslav Molotov
Succeeded by	Anastas Mikoyan
Minister of the Armed Forces
In office 3 March 1947 – 24 March 1949
Premier	Joseph Stalin
Preceded by	Joseph Stalin
Succeeded by	Aleksandr Vasilevsky
Chairman of the Council of People's Commissars of the Russian SFSR
In office 22 July 1937 – 17 September 1938
President	Mikhail Kalinin; Alexei Badayev
Preceded by	Daniil Sulimov
Succeeded by	Vasily Vakhrushev (1939)

Personal details
- Born: 11 June 1895 Nizhny Novgorod, Russia
- Died: 24 February 1975 (aged 79) Moscow, Soviet Union
- Resting place: Novodevichy Cemetery
- Party: Communist Party of the Soviet Union (1917–1960)
- Awards: Hero of Socialist Labour

Military service
- Allegiance: Soviet Union
- Branch/service: Red Army
- Years of service: 1941–1958
- Rank: Marshal of the Soviet Union (1947–1958)
- Commands: Soviet Armed Forces
- Battles/wars: World War II
- Central institution membership: 1948–58: Full member, 18th, 19th, 20th Politburo; 1946–52: 18th Orgburo; 1946–48: Candidate member, 18th Politburo; 1944–45: Member, State Defense Committee; 1934–58: Full member, 17th, 18th, 19th, 20th Central Committee; Other offices held: 1958: Governor of the State Bank of the USSR; 1940–42:Governor of the State Bank of the USSR; 1938–40:Governor of the State Bank of the USSR; 1938–44: Deputy Chairman of the Council of People's Commissars; 1931–37: Chairman of the Executive Committee of the Moscow City Soviet

Nikolai Alexandrovich Bulganin (Russian: Николай Александрович Булганин; 11 June [O.S. 30 May] 1895 – 24 February 1975) was a Soviet and Russian politician and the Premier of the Soviet Union from 1955 to 1958. He also served as Minister of Defense, following service in the Red Army during World War II.

Born in Nizhny Novgorod, Bulganin joined the Bolshevik Party in 1917 and became a member of the Soviet political police Cheka a year later. After the Russian Civil War, he held a number of administrative positions until 1931, when he became chairman of the Moscow City Soviet with the support of Lazar Kaganovich. A loyal Stalinist, Bulganin rose through the Soviet hierarchy in the middle of Stalin's purges, and in 1937 he was named premier of the Russian SFSR and a full member of the Central Committee of the Communist Party. A year later he was appointed Deputy Prime Minister of the Soviet Union and head of the Soviet State Bank. Although he was never a front-line commander, Bulganin held a number of important political posts in the Red Army during World War II, and served in Stalin's State Defense Committee. In 1947, he succeeded Stalin as Minister for the Armed Forces and was named a Marshal of the Soviet Union. In early 1948, he became a full member of the Politburo.

After Stalin's death in 1953, Bulganin supported Nikita Khrushchev during his power struggle with Georgy Malenkov. In 1955, he replaced Malenkov as Premier of the Soviet Union. Initially a close ally of Khrushchev, Bulganin came to doubt his policies and became associated with an opposition group led by Vyacheslav Molotov. The group's defeat led to the fall of Bulganin, and in 1958 he was dismissed as premier and expelled from the Politburo. Forced into retirement, Bulganin died in 1975 at the age of 79.

== Early life and career ==
Bulganin was born in 1895 in Nizhny Novgorod. The son of an office worker, he was of Russian ethnicity. He joined the Bolshevik Party in March 1917. In 1918, he was recruited into the Cheka, the Bolshevik regime's political police, where he served until 1922. During the summer of 1918, he worked with Lazar Kaganovich, the local communist leader, in imposing the Red Terror in Nizhny Novgorod. He worked with Kaganovich again in Turkestan in 1920. After the Russian Civil War (1917–1923), Bulganin became an industrial manager and worked in the electricity administration until 1927. He was the director of the Moscow electricity supply from 1927 to 1931. From 1931 to 1937, he served as chairman of the executive committee of the Moscow City Soviet (the equivalent of mayor). He came into office soon after Kaganovich had been put in charge of the Moscow party organisation.

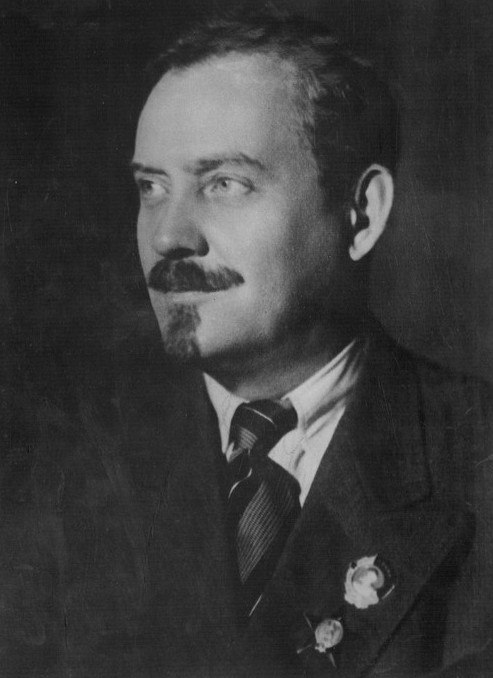
Bulganin in 1937

In 1934, the 17th Congress of the Communist Party elected Bulganin as a candidate member of the Central Committee. A loyal Stalinist, he was promoted rapidly as other leaders fell victim to Joseph Stalin's Great Purge in 1937 and 1938. In July 1937, Bulganin was appointed Chairman of the Council of People's Commissars (the equivalent of Prime Minister) of the Russian Soviet Federative Socialist Republic (RSFSR) after the arrest of the previous incumbent, Daniil Sulimov. Bulganin became a full member of the Central Committee later that year. In September 1938, he became Deputy Prime Minister of the Soviet Union and head of the State Bank of the USSR (Gosbank).

== World War II ==
During World War II, Bulganin played a leading role in the government and Red Army, although he was never a front-line commander. His first posting was as chief political commissar on the Western Front, which was commanded by Marshal Timoshenko. He held similar posts until July 1944, when he was appointed the Soviet representative on the Polish Committee of National Liberation. On 18 November 1944, he was given the rank of General; three days later, he replaced Marshal Voroshilov on the State Defence Committee. He was also appointed USSR Deputy Minister for Defence, the Minister being Joseph Stalin.

In March 1946, Bulganin became a candidate member of the 18th Politburo of the Communist Party. In March 1947, he succeeded Stalin as Minister for the Armed Forces, and was again Deputy Prime Minister of the Soviet Union, under Stalin, from 1947 to 1950. In November 1947, he was promoted to the rank of Marshal of the Soviet Union. By February 1948, he had become a full member of the 18th Politburo.

== Personality ==
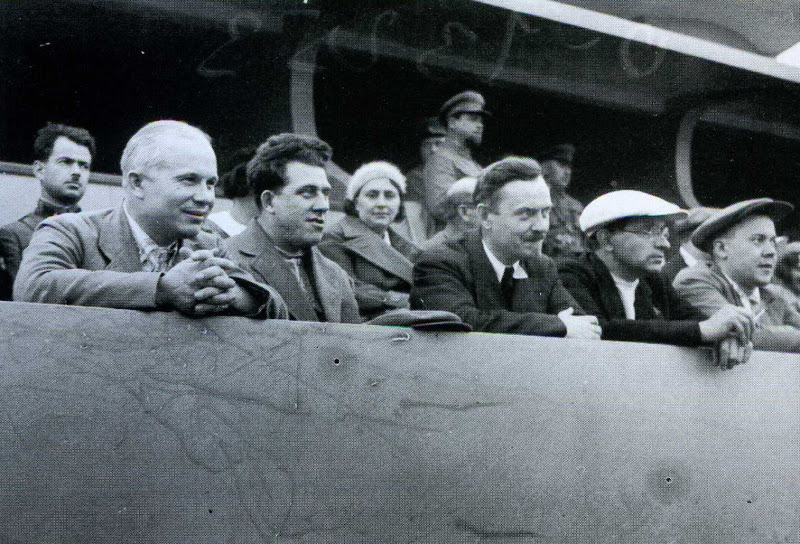
Bulganin (third from right) watching a football match in 1935

Bulganin reached the highest rank in the Red Army, despite only having served as a political officer. His role was to ensure that none of the genuine wartime commanders, particularly Marshal Zhukov, became powerful enough to threaten Stalin. Pavel Sudoplatov, who participated in conferences in the Kremlin with him, wrote contemptuously about how Bulganin failed to understand elementary military concepts. Sudoplatov added:

Bulganin was notorious for avoiding decisions. Letters requesting urgent action remained unsigned for months. The entire secretariat of the Council of Ministers was furious with his style of work, especially when Stalin left him in charge while he vacationed in the Caucasus.... Bulganin's appearance was deceiving. Unlike Khrushchev or Beria, Bulganin was always smartly dressed and looked like an old nobleman, with well-groomed grey hair and goatee. Later I learnt he was a heavy drinker and an admirer of ballerinas and singers from the Bolshoi Theatre. He was a man without any political principles, only the obedient servant of any leader.

In March 1949, Bulganin was replaced as Minister for Defence by a career soldier, Aleksandr Vasilevsky, and then was responsible for the arms industry.

Conversely, a 1955 report from the US Central Intelligence Agency suggests that Bulganin's tenure at the State Bank demonstrated high intelligence and his ability to learn quickly:

Bulganin impressed those who had worked with him in the State Bank, including a famous expert on banking, with his high intelligence, mild manners, and capacity to learn in a very short time the most special and difficult of problems.

== Premiership ==
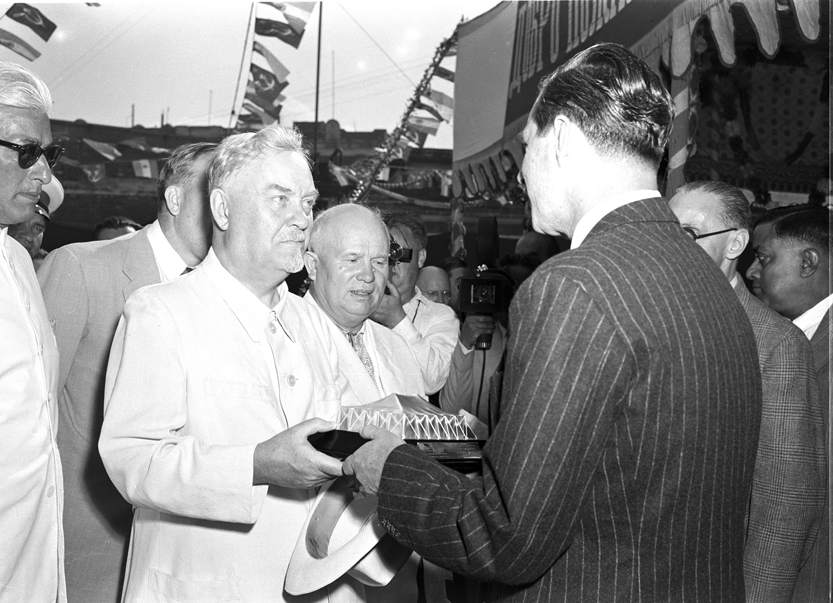
Bulganin and Khrushchev in India

Bulganin in 1955.

After Stalin's death in March 1953, Bulganin moved into sixth place in the Soviet leadership, when he was reappointed to the post of Defense Minister, but with Marshal Zhukov as his deputy. He was an ally of Nikita Khrushchev during his power struggle with Georgy Malenkov, and in February 1955 he succeeded Malenkov as Premier of the Soviet Union. He was generally seen as a supporter of Khrushchev's reforms and destalinisation. In July 1955, he attended the Geneva Summit, with U.S. President Dwight D. Eisenhower, French Prime Minister Edgar Faure, and British Prime Minister Anthony Eden. He and Khrushchev travelled together to India, Yugoslavia and in April 1956 to Britain, where they were known in the press as "the B and K show" or "Bulge and Crush". In his memoirs, however, Khrushchev recounted that he believed that he "couldn't rely on [Bulganin] fully."

During the Suez Crisis of October–November 1956, Bulganin sent letters to the governments of the United Kingdom, France, and Israel threatening rocket attacks on London, Paris, and Tel Aviv if they did not withdraw their forces from Egypt. In a letter to Israeli prime minister David Ben-Gurion, Bulganin wrote, "Israel is playing with the fate of peace, with the fate of its own people, in a criminal and irresponsible manner; [...] which will place a question [mark] upon the very existence of Israel as a State." Khrushchev, in his memoirs, admitted the threat was designed simply to divide Western opinion, especially since at the time he did not have enough ICBMs to launch the rockets, and in any case he had no intention of going to war in 1956.

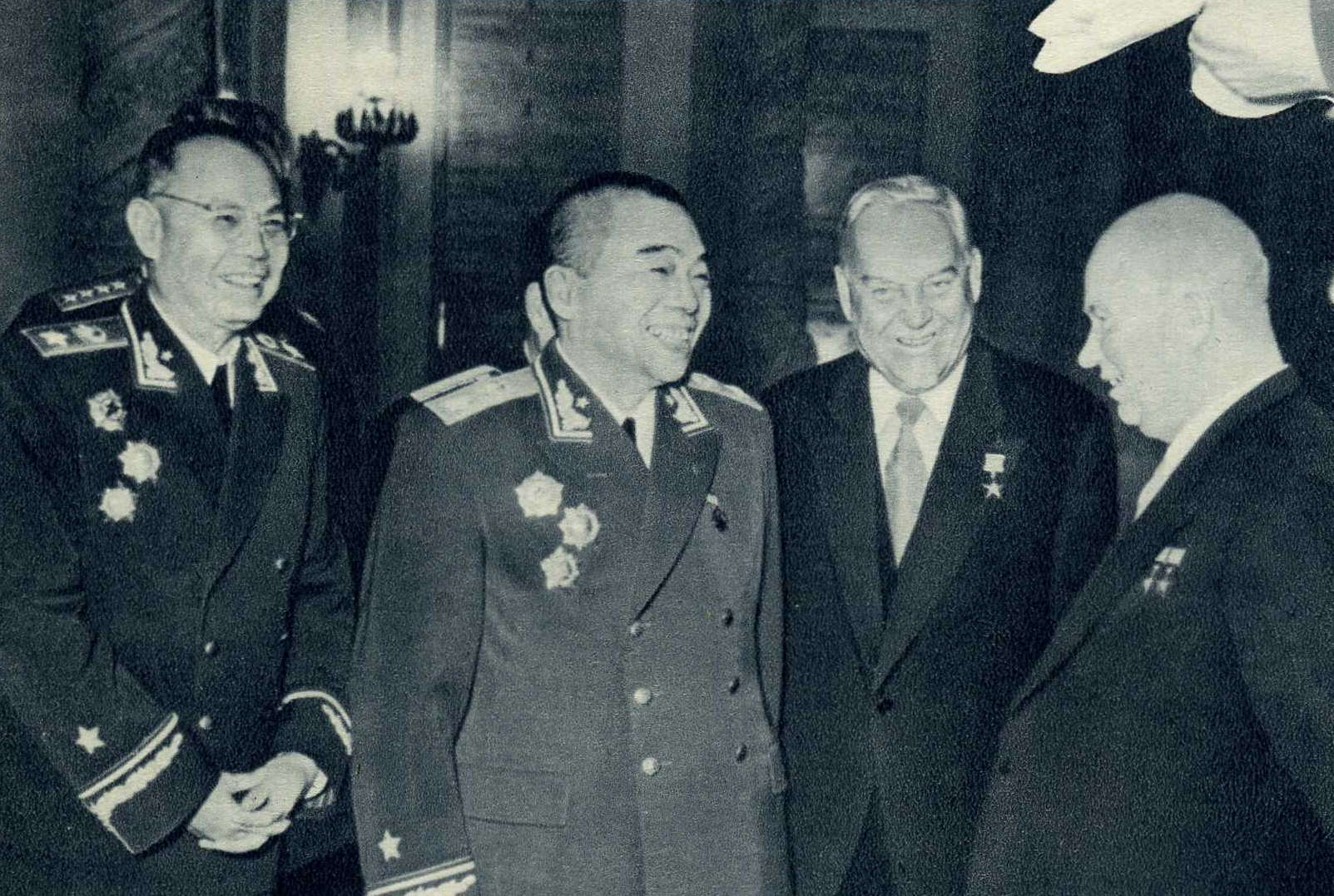
Bulganin with Khrushchev and Chinese Marshals Peng Dehuai and Ye Jianying

By 1957, however, Bulganin had come to share the doubts held about Khrushchev's policies by the opposition group (which Khrushchev and his supporters labelled the "Anti-Party Group") led by Vyacheslav Molotov. In June, when the dissenters tried to remove Khrushchev from power at a meeting of the Politburo, Bulganin vacillated between the two camps. When the dissenters were defeated and removed from power, Bulganin held on to his position for a while, but in March 1958, at a session of the Supreme Soviet, Khrushchev forced his resignation. Bulganin was appointed Governor of the Soviet State Bank, a job he had held two decades before, but in August was dispatched to Stavropol as Chairman of the Regional Economic Council, a token position, and on 12 November he was expelled from the Presidium (Politburo) of the Central Committee. In September, he was removed from the Central Committee and deprived of the title of Marshal, and in February 1960 he was retired on a pension.

== Personal life and death ==
His wife was Elena Mikhailovna Korovina, an English teacher from a Moscow school. The couple had two children: a son Leo and a daughter Vera. Vera married the son of Admiral Nikolai Kuznetsov.

Bulganin died on 24 February 1975, after a long illness at the age of 79 and was buried in the Novodevichy Cemetery.

== Honours and awards ==
Hero of Socialist Labour (10 June 1955)
Orders of Lenin, twice (1931, 1955)
Order of the Red Banner (1943)
Order of Suvorov, 1st class (1945) and 2nd class (1943)
Order of Kutuzov, 1st class, twice (1943, 1944)
Order of the Red Star, twice (1935, 1953)
Order of the Republic (Tuvan People's Republic, 3 March 1942)
Grand Cross of the Virtuti Militari (Poland)
Order of the Red Banner, (Mongolia, 1942)

== See also ==
- Outline of the Russian Revolution and Civil War
- Bibliography of the Russian Revolution and Civil War
- Bibliography of Stalinism and the Soviet Union
- Index of Old Bolsheviks
- Index of articles related to the Russian Revolution and Civil War
- Stalin: Waiting for Hitler, 1929-1941

Political offices
Preceded by Daniil Sulimov	Chairman of the Council of People's Commissars of the Russian SFSR; 22 July 1937 — 17 September 1938	Succeeded by Vasily Vakhrushev
Preceded by Joseph Stalin	Minister of the Armed Forces; 3 March 1947 – 24 March 1949	Succeeded by Aleksandr Vasilevsky
Preceded by Nikolai Kuznetsov	Minister of Defense of the Soviet Union; 15 March 1953 – 9 February 1955	Succeeded by Georgy Zhukov
Preceded by Aleksandr Vasilevsky	Minister of Defense of the Soviet Union; 15 March 1953 – 9 February 1955	Succeeded by Georgy Zhukov
Preceded by Georgy Malenkov	Premier of the Soviet Union; 8 February 1955 – 27 March 1958	Succeeded by Nikita Khrushchev
Preceded by A. P. Grichmanov	Governor of Board of the Soviet State Bank; 1938–1940	Succeeded by N. K. Sokolov
Preceded by N. K. Sokolov	Governor of Board of the Soviet State Bank; 1940	Succeeded by Ya. I. Golev
Preceded by Vasili Popov	Governor of Board of the Soviet State Bank; 1958	Succeeded by A. K. Korovushkin
