= Secretariat of the 19th Congress of the Communist Party of the Soviet Union =

The 19th Secretariat of the Communist Party of the Soviet Union was elected by the 19th Central Committee in the aftermath of the 19th Congress.

== List of members ==
Name (birth–death)	Took office	Left office	Duration	Note
Joseph Stalin (1878–1953)	14 October 1952	5 March 1953	142 days	Died in office.
Nikita Khrushchev (1894–1971)	14 October 1952	25 February 1956	3 years, 134 days	Elected First Secretary at the 3rd Plenary Session.
Averky Aristov (1903–1973)	16 October 1952	14 March 1953	80 days	Relieved of his duties at the 2nd Plenary Session.
Averky Aristov (1903–1973)	7 December 1955	25 February 1956	80 days	Elected at the 10th Plenary Session.
Nikolay Belyaev (1903–1966)	7 December 1955	25 February 1956	80 days	Elected at the 10th Plenary Session.
Leonid Brezhnev (1906–1982)	14 October 1952	5 March 1953	142 days	Relieved of his duties at the 2nd Plenary Session.
Nikolay Ignatov (1901–1966)	14 October 1952	5 March 1953	142 days	Relieved of his duties at the 2nd Plenary Session.
Semyon Ignatyev (1904–1983)	5 March 1953	6 April 1953	142 days	Elected at the 2nd Plenary Session, and relieved of his duties later on.
Georgy Malenkov (1902–1988)	14 October 1952	14 March 1953	142 days	Relieved of his duties at the 3rd Plenary Session.
Nikolai Mikhailov (1906–1982)	14 October 1952	14 March 1953	142 days	Relieved of his duties at the 3rd Plenary Session.
Nikolai Pegov (1905–1991)	14 October 1952	5 March 1953	142 days	Relieved of his duties at the 2nd Plenary Session.
Panteleimon Ponomarenko (1902–1984)	14 October 1952	5 March 1953	142 days	Relieved of his duties at the 2nd Plenary Session.
Pyotr Pospelov (1898–1979)	5 March 1953	25 February 1956	2 years, 357 days	Elected at the 2nd Plenary Session.
Nikolai Shatalin (1904–1984)	5 March 1953	8 March 1955	2 years, 3 days	Elected at the 2nd Plenary Session, and relieved of his duties at the 9th Plenary Session.
Dmitri Shepilov (1905–1995)	7 December 1955	25 February 1956	80 days	Elected at the 10th Plenary Session.
Mikhail Suslov (1902–1982)	14 October 1952	25 February 1956	3 years, 134 days	—
