= Politburo of the 17th Congress of the All-Union Communist Party (Bolsheviks) =

17th Politburo

10 February 1934 – 22 March 1939

Leadership
- General Secretary: Joseph Stalin
- Second Secretary: Vyacheslav Molotov (Jul.– Dec. 1930); Lazar Kaganovich (1930–1934)
- Politburo: 12 full & 9 candidates
- Secretariat: 6 members
- Orgburo: 12 full & 2 candidates

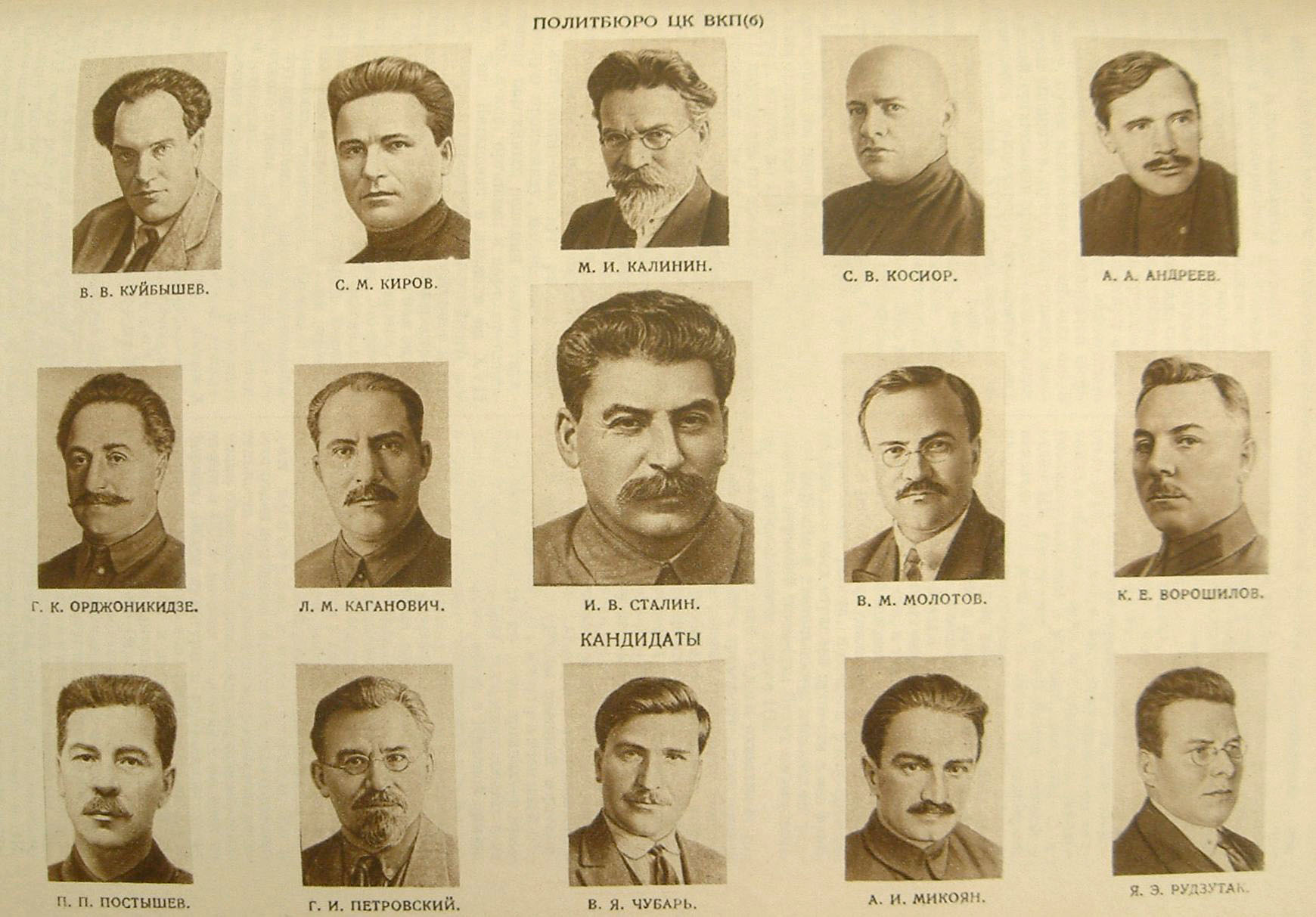
Portraits of the 1934 Politburo

The Politburo of the 17th Congress of the All-Union Communist Party (Bolsheviks) was in session from 1934 to 1939.

== Composition ==
=== Members ===
Members of the Politburo of the 17th Congress of the All-Union Communist Party (Bolsheviks)
Name	Cyrillic	16th POL	18th POL	Birth	Death	PM	Ethnicity	Gender	Portrait
Andrey Andreyev	Андрей Андреев	Old	Reelected	1895	1971	1914	Russian	Male	
Vlas Chubar	Влас Чубар	Promoted	Relieved	1891	1939	1907	Ukrainian	Male	Vlas Chubar
Lazar Kaganovich	Лазарь Каганович	Old	Reelected	1893	1991	1911	Jewish	Male	
Mikhail Kalinin	Михаил Калинин	Old	Reelected	1875	1946	1898	Russian	Male	Mikhail Kalinin
Sergey Kirov	Серге́й Ки́ров	Old	Murder	1886	1934	1904	Russian	Male	
Stanislav Kosior	Станислав Косиор	Old	Arrested	1889	1939	1907	Polish	Male	Stanislav Kosior
Valerian Kuybyshev	Валериан Куйбышев	Old	Died	1888	1935	1904	Russian	Male	Valerian Kuybyshev
Anastas Mikoyan	Анаста́с Микоя́н	Promoted	Reelected	1895	1978	1915	Armenian	Male	
Vyacheslav Molotov	Вячеслав Молотов	Old	Reelected	1890	1986	1906	Russian	Male	
Grigol Ordzhonikidze	Григо́рий Орджоники́дзе	Old	Suicide	1886	1937	1903	Georgian	Male	
Joseph Stalin	Ио́сиф Ста́лин	Old	Reelected	1878	1953	1898	Georgian	Male	
Kliment Voroshilov	Климент Ворошилов	Old	Reelected	1881	1969	1903	Russian	Male	

=== Candidates ===
Candidate Members of the Politburo of the 17th Congress of the All-Union Communist Party (Bolsheviks)
Name	Cyrillic	16th POL	18th POL	Birth	Death	PM	Ethnicity	Gender	Portrait
Vlas Chubar	Влас Чубар	Candidate	Promoted	1891	1939	1907	Ukrainian	Male	Vlas Chubar
Robert Eikhe	Роберт Эйхе	By-election	Arrested	1890	1940	1905	Latvian	Male	
Nikita Khrushchev	Никита Хрущёв	By-election	Member	1894	1971	1918	Russian	Male	
Anastas Mikoyan	Анаста́с Микоя́н	Candidate	Promoted	1895	1978	1915	Armenian	Male	
Grigory Petrovsky	Григо́рій Петро́вський	Candidate	Not	1878	1958	1898	Ukrainian	Male	Grigory Petrovsky
Pavel Postyshev	Григо́рій Петро́вський	New	Relieved	1887	1939	1904	Russian	Male	a man with wavy but well kept hair, bearded, smiling to the camera, wearing a black but stripped suit, a white shirt and a coloured tie
Jānis Rudzutaks	Ян Рудзутак	Demoted	Relieved	1887	1938	1905	Latvian	Male	Jānis Rudzutaks
Nikolai Yezhov	Николай Ежов	By-election	Not	1895	1940	1917	Russian- Lithuanian (Note: His father was Russian and his mother Lithuanian)	Male	
Andrei Zhdanov	Андрей Жданов	By-election	Member	1896	1948	1915	Russian	Male	Andrei Zhdanov
