= Central Committee of the 20th Congress of the Communist Party of the Soviet Union =

The Central Committee of the 20th Congress of the Communist Party of the Soviet Union was in session from 1956 until 1961. Its 133 (full voting) Members and 122 (non-voting) Candidate members were elected at the 20th Party Congress. It elected, at its 1st Plenary Session, the 20th Presidium, the 20th Secretariat and the 20th Party Control Committee of the Communist Party of the Soviet Union.

== Plenums ==
The Central Committee was not a permanent institution. It convened plenary sessions. 19 CC plenary sessions were held between the 20th Congress and the 22nd Congress. When the CC was not in session, decision-making power was vested in the internal bodies of the CC itself; that is, the Politburo and the Secretariat. None of these bodies were permanent either; typically they convened several times a month.

Plenary sessions of the Central Committee
Plenum	Date	Length
1st Plenary Session	27 February 1956	1 day
2nd Plenary Session	20–24 December 1956	5 days
3rd Plenary Session	13–14 February 1957	2 days
4th Plenary Session	22–29 June 1957	8 days
5th Plenary Session	28–29 October 1957	2 days
6th Plenary Session	16–17 December 1957	2 days
7th Plenary Session	25–26 February 1958	2 days
8th Plenary Session	6–7 May 1958	2 days
9th Plenary Session	17–18 June 1958	2 days
10th Plenary Session	5 September 1958	1 day
11th Plenary Session	12 November 1958	1 day
12th Plenary Session	15–19 December 1958	5 days
13th Plenary Session	24–29 June 1959	6 days
14th Plenary Session	22–25 December 1959	4 days
15th Plenary Session	4 May 1960	1 day
16th Plenary Session	13–16 July 1960	4 days
17th Plenary Session	10–18 January 1961	9 days
18th Plenary Session	19 June 1961	1 day
19th Plenary Session	14 October 1961	1 day

== Composition ==
=== Members ===
Members of the Central Committee of the 20th Congress of the Communist Party of the Soviet Union
Name	Cyrillic	19th CC	22nd CC	Birth	Death	PM	Ethnicity	Gender
Pavel Alforov	Па́вел Алфёров	New	Not	1906	1971	1930	Russian	Male
Andrey Andreyev	Андре́й Андре́ев	Old	Not	1895	1971	1914	Russian	Male
Averky Aristov	Аверкий Аристов	Old	Reelected	1903	1973	1921	Belarusian	Male
Nikolay Avkhimovich	Николай Авхимо́вич	New	Not	1907	1988	1926	Belarusian	Male
Sukhan Babayev	Суха́н Баба́ев	Old	Removed	1910	1995	1939	Turkmen	Male
Nikolai Baibakov	Никола́й Байбако́в	Old	Not	1911	2008	1939	Russian	Male
Nikolai Belyaev	Никола́й Беля́ев	Old	Not	1903	1966	1925	Russian	Male
Ivan Benediktov	Ива́н Бенеди́ктов	Old	Reelected	1902	1983	1930	Russian	Male
Boris Beshchev	Борис Бещев	Old	Reelected	1903	1981	1927	Russian	Male
Nikolai Bobrovnikov	Никола́й Бобро́вников	New	Not	1901	1991	1931	Russian	Male
Ivan Boytsov	Иван Бойцов	Old	Not	1896	1988	1919	Russian	Male
Dmitry Brezhnev	Дми́трий Бре́жнев	New	Not	1905	1982	1926	Russian	Male
Leonid Brezhnev	Леонид Брежнев	Old	Reelected	1906	1982	1931	Russian	Male
Nikolai Bulganin	Николай Булганин	Old	Not	1895	1975	1917	Russian	Male
Vasily Chernyshev	Василий Чернышёв	Old	Reelected	1908	1969	1928	Russian	Male
Abdurakhman Daniyalov	Абдурахман Даниялов	Old	Reelected	1908	1981	1928	Avar	Male
Pyotr Dementev	Пётр Дементьев	Old	Reelected	1907	1977	1938	Russian	Male
Georgy Denisov	Георгий Денисов	Old	Reelected	1909	1996	1928	Russian	Male
Boris Deryugin	Бори́с Дерю́гин	New	Not	1916	1979	1939	Russian	Male
Pavel Doronin	Павел Доро́нин	New	Not	1909	1976	1927	Russian	Male
Nikolay Dudorov	Николай Дудоров	New	Not	1906	1977	1927	Russian	Male
Yekaterina Furtseva	Екатерина Фурцева	Candidate	Reelected	1910	1974	1930	Russian	Female
Anton Gayevoy	Антон Гаевой	New	Reelected	1907	1962	1930	Ukrainian	Male
Bobojon Ghafurov	Бободжан Гафуров	Old	Not	1908	1977	1932	Tajik	Male
Fodor Goryachev	Фёдор Горячев	Old	Reelected	1905	1996	1927	Russian	Male
Ivan Grishin	Иван Гри́шин	Old	Not	1911	1985	1931	Russian	Male
Viktor Grishin	Ви́ктор Гри́шин	Old	Reelected	1914	1992	1939	Russian	Male
Andrei Gromyko	Андрей Громыко	Candidate	Reelected	1909	1989	1931	Belarusian	Male
Nikolai F. Ignatov	Никола́й Игна́тов	New	Reelected	1914	1967	1939	Russian	Male
Nikolai G. Ignatov	Никола́й Игна́тов	Old	Reelected	1901	1966	1924	Russian	Male
Semyon Ignatyev	Семён Игнатьев	Old	Not	1904	1983	1926	Ukrainian	Male
Givi Javakhishvili	Гиви Джавахишвили	New	Reelected	1912	1985	1941	Georgian	Male
Ivan Kabanov	Иван Кабанов	Old	Not	1897	1972	1917	Russian	Male
Johannes Käbin	Йоха́ннес Кэ́бин	Old	Reelected	1905	1999	1927	Estonian	Male
Lazar Kaganovich	Лазарь Каганович	Old	Removed	1893	1991	1911	Russian	Male
Nikifor Kalchenko	Никифор Ка́льченко	Candidate	Candidate	1906	1989	1932	Ukrainian	Male
Jānis Kalnbērziņš	Ян Калнбе́рзинь	Old	Reelected	1893	1986	1917	Latvian	Male
Ivan Kapitonov	Иван Капитонов	Old	Reelected	1915	2002	1939	Russian	Male
Nikita Khrushchev	Никита Хрущёв	Old	Reelected	1894	1971	1918	Russian	Male
Aleksey Khvorostukhin	Алексей Хворостухин	Old	Not	1900	1985	1924	Ukrainian	Male
Aleksey Kirichenko	Алексе́й Кириче́нко	Old	Not	1908	1975	1930	Ukrainian	Male
Andrei Kirilenko	Андре́й Кириле́нко	New	Reelected	1906	1990	1930	Ukrainian	Male
Nikolai Kiselov	Николай Киселёв	Old	Not	1903	1983	1925	Russian	Male
Vasily Klimenko	Василий Клименко	New	Reelected	1906	1984	1906	Ukrainian	Male
Boris Kobelev	Борис Кобелев	New	Removed	1915	1980	1940	Russian	Male
Yevgeny Kolushchinsky	Евгений Колущинский	New	Not	1902	1973	1927	Russian	Male
Ivan Konev	Иван Конев	Old	Reelected	1897	1973	1918	Russian	Male
Oleksandr Korniychuk	Александр Корнейчук	Old	Reelected	1905	1972	1940	Ukrainian	Male
Demyan Korotchenko	Демьян Коротченко	Old	Not	1894	1969	1918	Ukrainian	Male
Alexei Kosygin	Алексей Косыгин	Old	Reelected	1904	1980	1927	Russian	Male
Maria Kovrigina	Мария Ковригина	Old	Not	1910	1995	1931	Russian	Female
Frol Kozlov	Фрол Козлов	Old	Reelected	1908	1965	1926	Russian	Male
Mikhail Krunichev	Михаил Хруничев	Old	Died	1901	1961	1921	Russian	Male
Vladimir Kucherenko	Владимир Кучеренко	New	Reelected	1909	1963	1942	Russian	Male
Dinmukhamed Kunaev	Дінмұхаммед Қонаев	New	Reelected	1912	1993	1939	Kazakh	Male
Otto Kuusinen	Отто Куусинен	Old	Reelected	1881	1964	1918	Finn	Male
Vasily Kuznetsov	Василий Кузнецов	Old	Reelected	1901	1990	1927	Russian	Male
Nikolay Laptev	Алексей Ларионов	New	Not	1909	1976	1929	Russian	Male
Aleksey Larionov	Алексей Ларионов	Old	Died	1907	1960	1927	Russian	Male
Ivan Latunov	Иван Латунов	Old	Not	1906	1970	1930	Russian	Male
Leonid Lubennikov	Леони́д Лубе́нников	New	Not	1910	1980	1930	Russian	Male
Georgy Malenkov	Георги Маленков	Old	Removed	1902	1988	1920	Russian	Male
Rodion Malinovsky	Родио́н Малино́вский	Candidate	Reelected	1898	1967	1926	Ukrainian	Male
Vyacheslav Malyshev	Вячеслав Малышев	Old	Died	1902	1957	1926	Russian	Male
Ivan Marchenko	Иван Марченко	New	Candidate	1908	1972	1929	Russian	Male
Vasily Markov	Васи́лий Ма́рков	New	Not	1905	1978	1923	Russian	Male
Vladimir Matskevich	Владимир Мацкевич	New	Not	1909	1998	1939	Ukrainian	Male
Kirill Mazurov	Кири́лл Ма́зуров	New	Reelected	1914	1989	1940	Belarusian	Male
Nikolai Mikhailov	Николай Михайлов	Old	Reelected	1906	1982	1930	Russian	Male
Anastas Mikoyan	Анаста́с Микоя́н	Old	Reelected	1895	1978	1915	Armenian	Male
Mark Mitin	Марк Митин	Old	Not	1901	1987	1919	Ukrainian	Male
Vyacheslav Molotov	Вячеслав Молотов	Old	Removed	1890	1986	1906	Russian	Male
Kirill Moskalenko	Кирилл Москаленко	New	Reelected	1902	1985	1926	Ukrainian	Male
Vasily Moskvin	Василий Москвин	Old	Not	1910	1969	1932	Russian	Male
Nuritdin Mukhitdinov	Нуритди́н Мухитди́нов	Old	Reelected	1917	2008	1942	Uzbek	Male
Zinnat Muratov	Зиннят Муратов	Old	Not	1906	1988	1930	Tatar	Male
Imam Mustafayev	Имам Мустафаев	New	Not	1910	1997	1940	Azerbaijani	Male
Vasil Mzhavanadze	Василий Мжаванадзе	New	Reelected	1902	1988	1927	Georgian	Male
Yadgar Nasriddinova	Ядгар Насриддинова	New	Reelected	1920	2006	1942	Uzbek	Female
Nikolay Organov	Николай Органов	Old	Reelected	1901	1982	1925	Russian	Male
Anna Pankratova	Анна Панкратова	Old	Died	1897	1957	1919	Ukrainian	Female
Nikolai Patolichev	Николай Патоличев	Old	Reelected	1908	1989	1928	Russian	Male
Nikolai Pegov	Николай Пегов	Old	Reelected	1905	1991	1930	Russian	Male
Mikhail Pervukhin	Михаил Первухин	Old	Not	1904	1978	1919	Russian	Male
Konstantin Petukhov	Константин Петухов	New	Not	1914	1981	1940	Ukrainian	Male
Nikolai Podgorny	Никола́й Подго́рный	New	Reelected	1903	1983	1930	Ukrainian	Male
Dmitry Polyansky	Дми́трий Поля́нский	New	Reelected	1917	2001	1939	Ukrainian	Male
Panteleimon Ponomarenko	Пантелеймон Пономаренко	Old	Not	1902	1984	1925	Ukrainian	Male
Boris Ponomarev	Борис Пономарёв	Candidate	Reelected	1905	1995	1919	Russian	Male
Pyotr Pospelov	Пётр Поспелов	Old	Reelected	1898	1979	1916	Russian	Male
Vasily Prokofiev	Василий Прокофьев	Old	Not	1906	1996	1929	Russian	Male
Alexander Puzanov	Александр Пузанов	Old	Reelected	1906	1998	1925	Russian	Male
Konstantin Pysin	Константин Пысин	New	Reelected	1910	1987	1925	Russian	Male
Sadig Rahimov	Садых Рагимов	New	Not	1914	1974	1941	Azerbaijani	Male
Iskhak Razzakov	Садых Рагимов	Old	Not	1910	1979	1940	Kyrgyz	Male
Aleksey Rumyantsev	Алексей Румянцев	Old	Reelected	1905	1993	1940	Russian	Male
Maksim Saburov	Макси́м Сабу́ров	Old	Not	1900	1977	1920	Russian	Male
Zinovie Serdiuk	Зиновий Сердюк	Candidate	Reelected	1903	1982	1925	Ukrainian	Male
Ivan Serov	Иван Серов	Candidate	Not	1905	1990	1926	Russian	Male
Alexander Shelepin	Алекса́ндр Шеле́пин	Old	Reelected	1918	1994	1940	Russian	Male
Dmitri Shepilov	Дми́трий Шепи́лов	Old	Removed	1905	1995	1926	Russian	Male
Aleksey Shkolnikov	Алексей Шко́льников	Candidate	Not	1914	2003	1940	Russian	Male
Terenty Shtykov	Алексей Шко́льников	New	Not	1907	1964	1929	Belarusian	Male
Nikolai Shvernik	Никола́й Шве́рник	Old	Reelected	1888	1970	1905	Russian	Male
Antanas Sniečkus	Антанас Снечкус	Old	Reelected	1903	1974	1920	Lithuanian	Male
Vasily Sokolovsky	Василий Соколовский	Old	Candidate	1897	1968	1931	Belarusian	Male
Mikhail Stakhursky	Василий Соколовский	New	Not	1903	1971	1921	Ukrainian	Male
Alexander Struyev	Алекса́ндр Стру́ев	New	Not	1906	1991	1927	Russian	Male
Mikhail Suslov	Михаил Суслов	Old	Reelected	1902	1982	1921	Russian	Male
Viktor Suslov	Виктор Суслов	New	Not	1910	1969	1939	Russian	Male
Ivan Tevosian	Иван Тевосян	Old	Died	1902	1958	1918	Armenian	Male
Sergey Tikhomirov	Сергей Тихомиров	Candidate	Not	1905	1982	1939	Russian	Male
Fedor Titov	Фёдор Титов	Old	Reelected	1910	1989	1930	Tatar	Male
Vitaly Titov	Виталий Титов	New	Reelected	1907	1980	1938	Ukrainian	Male
Suren Tovmasyan	Суре́н Товмася́н	New	Not	1909	1980	1930	Armenian	Male
Dmitriy Ustinov	Дми́трий Усти́нов	Old	Reelected	1908	1984	1927	Russian	Male
Boris Vannikov	Борис Ванников	Old	Not	1897	1962	1919	Russian	Male
Aleksandr Vasilevsky	Александр Василевский	Old	Not	1895	1977	1938	Russian	Male
Alexander Volkov	Александр Волков	New	Reelected	1910	1990	1931	Russian	Male
Gennady Voronov	Геннадий Воронов	Old	Reelected	1910	1994	1931	Russian	Male
Kliment Voroshilov	Климент Ворошилов	Old	Not	1881	1969	1903	Russian	Male
Ivan Yakovlev	Иван Яковлев	Old	Not	1901	1966	1928	Russian	Male
Mikhail Yasnov	Михаил Яснов	Old	Reelected	1906	1991	1925	Russian	Male
Leonid Yefremov	Леонид Ефремов	New	Reelected	1912	2007	1941	Russian	Male
Mikhail Yefremov	Михаил Ефремов	New	Reelected	1911	2000	1931	Russian	Male
Georgy Yenyutin	Георгий Енютин	New	Reelected	1903	1969	1924	Russian	Male
Pavel Yudin	Павел Юдин	Candidate	Not	1899	1968	1918	Russian	Male
Alexander Zademidko	Александр Задеми́дко	New	Not	1908	2001	1930	Ukrainian	Male
Avraami Zavenyagin	Авраамий Завенягин	Candidate	Died	1901	1956	1917	Russian	Male
Ivan Zhegalin	Ива́н Жега́лин	Old	Reelected	1906	1984	1926	Russian	Male
Georgy Zhukov	Георгий Жуков	Old	Removed	1896	1974	1919	Russian	Male
Arseny Zverev	Арсений Зверев	Old	Not	1900	1969	1919	Russian	Male

=== Candidates ===
Candidate Members of the Central Committee of the 20th Congress of the Communist Party of the Soviet Union
Name	Cyrillic	19th CC	22nd CC	Birth	Death	PM	Ethnicity	Gender
Nadezhda Andreyeva	Надежда Андреева	New	Not	1903	2001	1924	Russian	Female
Ivan Bagramyan	Иван Баграмян	Candidate	Member	1897	1982	1941	Armenian	Male
Sergey Biryuzov	Серге́й Бирюзо́в	New	Member	1904	1964	1926	Russian	Male
Semyon Borisov	Семён Борисов	Candidate	Candidate	1911	1999	1932	Yakut	Male
Nikita Bubnovsky	Никита Бубновский	New	Candidate	1907	1997	1939	Ukrainian	Male
Semyon Budyonny	Семён Будённый	Candidate	Candidate	1883	1973	1919	Russian	Male
Sergey Butuzov	Сергей Бутузов	Candidate	Not	1909	1967	1939	Russian	Male
Pyotr Cheplakov	Пётр Чеплаков	Member	Not	1906	1985	1927	Russian	Male
Miron Chubinidze	Мирон Чубинидзе	New	Not	1905	1980	1926	Georgian	Male
Vasily Chuikov	Васи́лий Чуйко́в	Candidate	Member	1900	1982	1919	Russian	Male
Viktor Churayev	Виктор Чураев	New	Member	1903	1982	1929	Russian	Male
Nikolay Dygay	Николай Дыгай	Candidate	Member	1908	1963	1929	Russian	Male
Alexander Fadeyev	Александр Фадеев	Member	Suicide	1901	1956	1918	Russian	Male
Nikolay Firyubin	Николай Фирюбин	New	Candidate	1908	1983	1929	Russian	Male
Leonid Florentyev	Леонид Флорентьев	New	Candidate	1911	2003	1939	Russian	Male
Ivan Ganenko	Иван Ганенко	New	Not	1903	1995	1924	Russian	Male
Georgy Glebovsky	Гео́ргий Глебо́вский	New	Died	1912	1958	1940	Russian	Male
Alexander Gorbatov	Александр Горбатов	Candidate	Not	1891	1973	1919	Russian	Male
Sergey Gorshkov	Серге́й Горшков	New	Member	1910	1988	1942	Russian	Male
Andrei Grechko	Андре́й Гре́чко	Candidate	Member	1903	1976	1928	Ukrainian	Male
Konstantin Grishin	Константин Гришин	New	Member	1908	1973	1931	Russian	Male
Grigory Grishko	Григорий Гришко	New	Died	1906	1959	1930	Ukrainian	Male
Evgeny Gromov	Евге́ний Гро́мов	New	Not	1909	1981	1932	Russian	Male
Nikolai Gureev	Николай Гуреев	New	Not	1907	1978	1943	Russian	Male
Mykhailo Hrechukha	Михаи́л Гречу́ха	New	Not	1902	1976	1926	Ukrainian	Male
Aleksandr Ishkov	Александр Ишков	New	Candidate	1905	1988	1927	Russian	Male
Semon Islyukov	Семён Ислюков	New	Candidate	1915	1998	1939	Russian	Male
Olga Ivaschenko	Ольга Иващенко	New	Member	1906	1990	1928	Ukrainian	Female
Valery Kalmykov	Валерий Калмыков	New	Member	1908	1974	1942	Russian	Male
Mikhail Kanunnikov	Михаил Канунников	Candidate	Not	1902	1984	1926	Russian	Male
Vladimir Karasov	Владимир Карасёв	New	Not	1900	1967	1942	Russian	Male
Ivan Kazanets	Иван Казанец	New	Member	1918	2013	1944	Ukrainian	Male
Aleksandr Khakhalov	Александр Хахалов	Candidate	Not	1909	1970	1929	Buryat	Male
Aleksandr Klimov	Александр Климов	New	Candidate	1914	1979	1939	Russian	Male
Pavel Komarov	Павел Комаров	New	Not	1898	1983	1920	Russian	Male
Vasily Komyakhov	Василь Комяхов	New	Member	1911	1966	1941	Russian	Male
Fodor Konstantinov	Фёдор Константи́нов	New	Not	1901	1991	1918	Russian	Male
Leonid Korniyets	Леони́д Рома́нович Корни́ец	Candidate	Candidate	1901	1969	1926	Ukrainian	Male
Vasily Kosov	Леони́д Рома́нович Корни́ец	New	Not	1910	1996	1931	Ukrainian	Male
Anatoly Kostousov	Анатолий Костоусов	Candidate	Member	1906	1985	1925	Russian	Male
Konstantin Koval	Константин Коваль	New	Not	1908	1999	1938	Ukrainian	Male
Aleksey Kozlov	Алексей Козлов	Candidate	Not	1911	1982	1939	Russian	Male
Vasily Kozlov	Василий Козлов	New	Candidate	1903	1967	1927	Belarusian	Male
Mikhail Krakhmalov	Михаил Крахмалёв	New	Member	1914	1977	1939	Russian	Male
Pavel Kumykin	Павел Кумыкин	Candidate	Candidate	1901	1976	1921	Russian	Male
Vilis Lācis	Вилис Лацис	Candidate	Not	1904	1966	1928	Latvian	Male
Ivan Likhachev	Ива́н Лихачёв	New	Died	1896	1956	1917	Russian	Male
Pavel Lobanov	Павел Лобанов	New	Not	1902	1984	1927	Russian	Male
Savely Loginov	Саве́лий Ло́гинов	New	Died	1913	1960	1939	Belarusian	Male
Pyotr Lomako	Пётр Лома́ко	Candidate	Not	1904	1990	1925	Russian	Male
Alexander Luchinsky	Александр Лучинский	Candidate	Not	1900	1997	1943	Ukrainian	Male
Konstantin Lunov	Константи́н Лунёв	New	Not	1907	1980	1926	Russian	Male
Lidia Lykova	Лидия Лыкова	Candidate	Candidate	1913	2016	1938	Russian	Female
Yuri Maksarov	Юрий Максарёв	Candidate	Not	1903	1982	1921	Russian	Male
Yakov Malik	Яков Малик	Candidate	Not	1906	1980	1938	Russian	Male
Leonid Melnikov	Леонид Мельников	Member	Not	1906	1981	1928	Ukrainian	Male
Roman Melnikov	Роман Мельников	Candidate	Not	1908	1988	1928	Russian	Male
Mikhail Menshikov	Михаи́л Ме́ньшиков	New	Candidate	1902	1976	1927	Russian	Male
Aleksei Müürisepp	Алексей Мюрисеп	Candidate	Candidate	1902	1970	1926	Estonian	Male
Vladimir Mylarshchikov	Владимир Мыларщиков	New	Not	1911	1977	1931	Russian	Male
Leonty Naydek	Леонтий Найдек	New	Not	1907	1992	1929	Ukrainian	Male
Mitrofan Nedelin	Митрофан Неделин	Candidate	Died	1902	1960	1924	Russian	Male
Olga Nefodova	Ольга Нефёдова	New	Not	1907	?	1939	Russian	Female
Pyotr Niktin	Пётр Никитин	Candidate	Died	1909	1959	1930	Russian	Male
Ivan Nosenko	Иван Носенко	Candidate	Died	1902	1956	1925	Russian	Male
Georgy Orlov	Георгий Орлов	Candidate	Candidate	1903	1991	1940	Russian	Male
Kirill Orlovsky	Кири́лл Орло́вский	New	Not	1895	1968	1918	Belarusian	Male
Konstantin Ostrovityanov	Константин Островитянов	Candidate	Not	1892	1969	1914	Russian	Male
Justas Paleckis	Юстас Палецкис	Candidate	Candidate	1899	1980	1940	Lithuanian	Male
Dmitry Pavlov	Дмитрий Павлов	Candidate	Not	1905	1991	1926	Russian	Male
Alexander Pchelyakov	Александр Пчеляков	Candidate	Not	1908	1978	1939	Russian	Male
Aleksandr Petukhov	Алекса́ндр Петухо́в	New	Not	1914	1974	1939	Russian	Male
Nina Popova	Нина Попова	New	Reelected	1908	1994	1932	Russian	Female
Sergey Postovalov	Сергей Постовалов	Candidate	Candidate	1906	1968	1930	Russian	Male
Stepan Pylypets	Степан Пилипец	New	Not	1913	1989	1932	Ukrainian	Male
Sharof Rashidov	Шараф Рашидов	New	Member	1917	1983	1939	Uzbek	Male
David Rayzer	Давид Райзер	Candidate	Not	1904	1962	1939	Ukrainian	Male
Alexander Rudakov	Алекса́ндр Рудако́в	New	Candidate	1910	1966	1931	Russian	Male
Roman Rudenko	Рома́н Руде́нко	New	Not	1907	1981	1926	Russian	Male
Gherasim Rudi	Рома́н Руде́нко	New	Not	1907	1982	1939	Moldovan	Male
Vasily Ryabykov	Васи́лий Ря́биков	New	Not	1907	1974	1925	Moldovan	Male
Vladimir Semichastny	Влади́мир Семича́стный	New	Candidate	1924	2001	1944	Russian	Male
Ivan Senin	Иван Сенин	New	Member	1903	1981	1920	Ukrainian	Male
Zosima Shashkov	Зосима Шашков	Candidate	Not	1905	1984	1929	Russian	Male
Aleksandr Sheremetyev	Александр Шереме́тьев	New	Not	1901	1985	1918	Russian	Male
Pyotr Sinyagovsky	Геннадий Сизов	New	Not	1906	1996	1939	Ukrainian	Male
Gennady Sizov	Геннадий Сизов	New	Candidate	1903	1991	1926	Russian	Male
Ivan Skidadenko	Иван Скиданенко	New	Not	1898	1985	1939	Ukrainian	Male
Igor Skulkov	Игорь Скулков	Candidate	Candidate	1913	1971	1932	Russian	Male
Nikolay Smirnov	Николай Смирнов	New	Candidate	1906	1962	1931	Russian	Male
Tikhon Sokolov	Ти́хон Соколо́в	New	Not	1913	1992	1931	Russian	Male
Leonid Solovyov	Леони́д Соловьёв	Candidate	Member	1906	1993	1929	Russian	Male
Sergey Stepanov	Сергей Степанов	Candidate	Member	1903	1976	1928	Russian	Male
Nikolay Strokin	Николай Строкин	New	Candidate	1906	1972	1950	Russian	Male
Motiejus Šumauskas	Мотеюс Шумаускас	New	Candidate	1905	1982	1924	Lithuanian	Male
Fodor Surganov	Фёдор Сурганов	New	Member	1911	1976	1940	Belarusian	Male
Aleksey Surkov	Алексе́й Сурко́в	New	Candidate	1899	1983	1925	Russian	Male
Mikhail Tarasov	Михаил Тарасов	New	Not	1899	1970	1925	Russian	Male
Zhumabek Tashenev	Жумабек Ташенов	New	Not	1815	1986	1940	Kazakh	Male
Semyon Timoshenko	Семён Тимоше́нко	Candidate	Not	1895	1970	1919	Ukrainian	Male
Salchak Toka	Салчак Тока	Candidate	Candidate	1901	1973	1944	Tuvan	Male
Alexander Tromifov	Александр Трофимов	New	Not	1903	1980	1927	Russian	Male
Zoya Tumanova	Зоя Туманова	Candidate	Not	1922	2000	1943	Ukrainian	Female
Ivan Tur	Иван Тур	New	Not	1905	1965	1926	Ukrainian	Male
Feodosy Voronov	Феодо́сий Во́ронов	New	Member	1904	1975	1927	Russian	Male
Vyacheslav Yelyutin	Вячеслав Елю́тин	New	Member	1907	1993	1929	Russian	Male
Alexei Yepishev	Алексей Епишев	Candidate	Candidate	1908	1985	1929	Russian	Male
Andrey Yeryomenko	Андре́й Ерёменко	New	Member	1892	1970	1918	Ukrainian	Male
Mikhail Yevseyenko	Михаил Евсеенко	New	Not	1908	1985	1929	Russian	Male
Pavel Yudin	Павел Юдин	Candidate	Died	1902	1956	1928	Russian	Male
Tikhon Yurkin	Тихон Юркин	New	Not	1898	1986	1919	Russian	Male
Vasily Zakurdayev	Василий Закурдаев	New	Not	1903	1974	1927	Russian	Male
Ivan Zamchevsky	Иван Замчевский	New	Not	1909	1979	1929	Russian	Male
Georgy Zarubin	Георгий Зарубин	New	Died	1900	1958	1919	Russian	Male
Vasily Zhavoronkov	Василий Жаворонков	Candidate	Not	1906	1987	1929	Russian	Male
Pavel Zhigarev	Павел Жигарев	Candidate	Not	1900	1963	1920	Russian	Male
Dmitry Zhimerin	Дмитрий Жимерин	Candidate	Not	1906	1995	1928	Russian	Male
Konstantin Zhukov	Константин Жуков	New	Not	1906	1988	1936	Ukrainian	Male
Nikolay Zhurin	Николай Журин	New	Not	1908	1996	1930	Russian	Male
Grigory Zolotukhin	Григо́рий Золоту́хин	New	Not	1911	1988	1939	Russian	Male
Valerian Zorin	Валериан Зорин	New	Member	1902	1986	1922	Russian	Male
Vasily Zotov	Васи́лий Зо́тов	New	Candidate	1899	1977	1925	Russian	Male
