= Group of Inspectors General =

Sinecure body of the USSR Defense Ministry

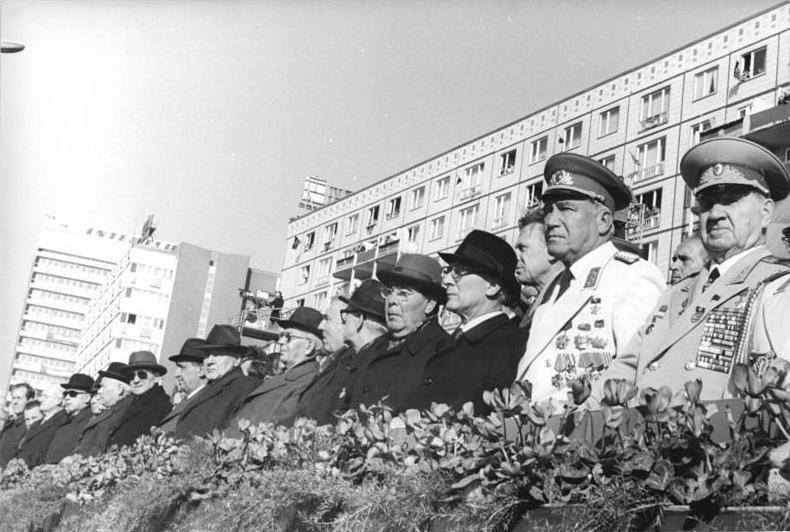
Inspector General of the USSR Ministry of Defense Vasily Chuikov (right) at the military parade in honour of the 30th anniversary of East Germany in Karl-Marx-Allee, East Berlin, October 7, 1979

The Group of Inspectors General of the Ministry of Defense of the Soviet Union (Russian: Группа генеральных инспекторов Министерства обороны СССР), colloquially known as the paradise group, was a body of the Soviet Ministry of Defense established in 1958. A sinecure position for semi-retired senior officers, the group was eliminated by the 1992 reforms of Marshal Yevgeny Shaposhnikov and its members dismissed.

Due to the lack of a mandatory retirement age in the Soviet Armed Forces, elderly senior officers who wished to avoid retiring or transferring to the reserve were assigned to the group, where they enjoyed full privileges of rank for the rest of their lives without regular duties. The group, as established, included inspectors general, who were Marshals of the Soviet Union, Chief marshals of the branch, and Admirals of the Fleet of the Soviet Union, inspector-advisors, who were marshals of the branch, army generals, colonel generals, consultants, who were select lieutenant generals and vice admirals. In 1960, automatic membership in the group was restricted to army generals and colonel generals were only admitted to it for "special merits." Despite this, a significant number of colonel generals became members of the group, as Defense Minister Dmitry Yazov's dismissal of its colonel generals in 1988 halved its numbers.

Although the group was theoretically limited to military personnel, two party leaders, Sergey Afanasyev and Lev Zaykov were assigned as consultants by 1991. This formed part of the official justification for the disbandment of the group, along with the introduction of a mandatory retirement age of 60 for colonel and army generals in the Russian Armed Forces.

The concept of a group of retired senior military officers providing expertise was revived with the establishment of the Office of Inspectors General in the Russian Armed Forces in 2008.
