= Secretariat of the 11th Congress of the Russian Communist Party (Bolsheviks) =

Secretariat of the 11th Congress

3 April 1922 – 26 April 1923

The Secretariat of the 11th Congress of the Russian Communist Party (Bolsheviks) was in session from 2 April 1922 to 25 April 1923.

== 11th Secretariat ==
| Name (birth–death) | Took office | Left office | Duration | Note |
|---|---|---|---|---|
| Valerian Kuybyshev (1888–1935) | 3 April 1922 | 25 April 1923 | 1 year, 22 days | — |
| Vyacheslav Molotov (1890–1986) | 3 April 1922 | 25 April 1923 | 1 year, 22 days | — |
| Joseph Stalin (1878–1953) | 3 April 1922 | 25 April 1923 | 1 year, 22 days | Elected General Secretary at the 1st Plenary Session. |
