= Politburo of the 18th Congress of the All-Union Communist Party (Bolsheviks) =

18th Politburo
- 17th Politburo ← → 19th Presidium
- Duration: 22 March 1939 – 16 October 1952

The Politburo of the 18th Congress of the All-Union Communist Party (Bolsheviks) was in session from 1939 to 1952.

== Composition ==
=== Members ===
Members of the Politburo of the 18th Congress of the All-Union Communist Party (Bolsheviks)
Name	Cyrillic	17th POL	19th PRE	Birth	Death	PM	Ethnicity	Gender	Portrait
Andrey Andreyev	Андрей Андреев	Old	Not	1895	1971	1914	Russian	Male	
Lavrentiy Beria	Лаврентий Берия	Promoted	Reelected	1899	1953	1917	Georgian	Male	
Nikolai Bulganin	Николай Булганин	Promoted	Reelected	1895	1975	1917	Russian	Male	Nikolai Bulganin
Lazar Kaganovich	Лазарь Каганович	Old	Reelected	1893	1991	1911	Jewish	Male	
Mikhail Kalinin	Михаил Калинин	Old	Died	1875	1946	1898	Russian	Male	Mikhail Kalinin
Nikita Khrushchev	Никита Хрущёв	Candidate	Reelected	1894	1971	1918	Russian	Male	
Alexei Kosygin	Алексей Косыгин	Promoted	Reelected	1904	1980	1927	Russian	Male	
Georgy Malenkov	Георги Маленков	Promoted	Reelected	1902	1988	1920	Russian	Male	
Anastas Mikoyan	Анастас Микоян	Old	Reelected	1895	1978	1915	Armenian	Male	
Vyacheslav Molotov	Вячеслав Молотов	Old	Reelected	1890	1986	1906	Russian	Male	
Joseph Stalin	Иосиф Сталин	Old	Reelected	1878	1953	1898	Georgian	Male	
Kliment Voroshilov	Климент Ворошилов	Old	Reelected	1881	1969	1903	Russian	Male	
Nikolai Voznesensky	Николай Вознесенский	Promoted	Relieved	1903	1950	1919	Russian	Male	
Andrei Zhdanov	Андрей Жданов	Candidate	Died	1896	1948	1915	Russian	Male	Andrei Zhdanov

=== Candidates ===
Candidate Members of the Politburo of the 18th Congress of the All-Union Communist Party (Bolsheviks)
Name	Cyrillic	17th POL	19th PRE	Birth	Death	PM	Ethnicity	Gender	Portrait
Lavrentiy Beria	Лаврентий Берия	New	Promoted	1899	1953	1917	Georgian	Male	
Nikolai Bulganin	Николай Булганин	By-election	Promoted	1895	1975	1917	Russian	Male	Nikolai Bulganin
Alexei Kosygin	Алексей Косыгин	By-election	Promoted	1904	1980	1927	Russian	Male	
Georgy Malenkov	Георги Маленков	By-election	Promoted	1902	1988	1920	Russian	Male	
Aleksandr Shcherbakov	Александр Щербаков	By-election	Died	1901	1945	1918	Russian	Male	
Nikolai Shvernik	Николай Шверник	New	Member	1888	1970	1905	Russian	Male	grayscale photo of Nikolay Shvernik
Nikolai Voznesensky	Николай Вознесенский	By-election	Promoted	1903	1950	1919	Russian	Male	
