= 20th Congress of the Communist Party of the Soviet Union =

1956 meeting of Soviet delegates

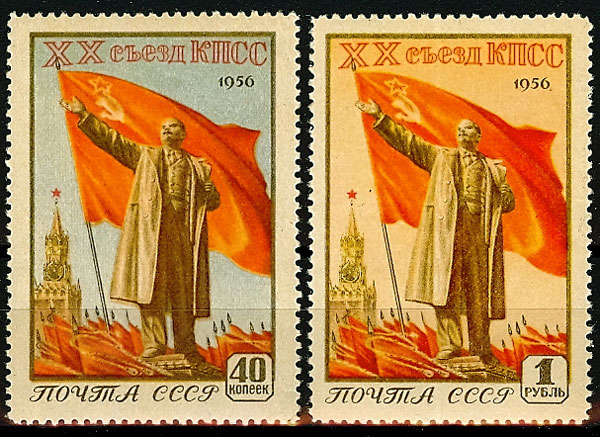
Stamp commemorating the 20th Congress

The 20th Congress of the Communist Party of the Soviet Union (Russian: XX съезд Коммунистической партии Советского Союза, romanized: XX syezd Kommunisticheskoy partii Sovetskogo Soyuza) was held during the period 14–25 February 1956. It is known especially for First Secretary Nikita Khrushchev's "Secret Speech", which denounced the personality cult and dictatorship of Joseph Stalin.

Delegates at this Congress of the Communist Party of the Soviet Union were given no warning of what to expect. Indeed, proceedings were opened by First Secretary Khruschev's call for all to stand in memory of the Communist leaders who had died since the previous Congress, in which he mentioned Stalin in the same breath as Klement Gottwald. Hints of a new direction only came out gradually over the next ten days, which left those present highly perplexed. The Polish communist leader Bolesław Bierut died in Moscow shortly after attending the 20th Congress. He died of a heart attack, supposedly due to shock.

The Congress elected the 133 (full voting) Members and 122 (non-voting) Candidate members of the 20th Central Committee.

== Secret speech ==
On 25 February, the last day of the Congress, it was announced that an unscheduled session had been called for the Soviet delegates. First Secretary Khrushchev's morning speech began with vague references to the harmful consequences of elevating a single individual so high that he took on the "supernatural characteristics akin to those of a god". Khrushchev went on to say that such a mistake had been made about Stalin. He himself had been guilty of what was, in essence, a distortion of the basic principles of Marxism-Leninism.

The attention of the audience was then drawn to Lenin's Testament, copies of which had been distributed, criticising Stalin's "rudeness". Further accusations, and hints of accusations, followed, including the suggestion that the murder of Sergei Kirov in 1934, the event that sparked the Great Terror, could be included in the list of Stalin's crimes. While denouncing Stalin, Khrushchev carefully praised the Communist Party, which had the strength to withstand all the negative effects of imaginary crimes and false accusations. The Party, in other words, had been a victim of Stalin, not an accessory to his crimes. He finished by calling on the Party to eradicate the cult of personality and return to "the revolutionary fight for the transformation of society".

The speech shocked delegates to the Congress, as it flew in the face of years of Soviet propaganda, which had claimed that Stalin was a wise, peaceful, and fair leader. After long deliberations, in a month the speech was reported to the general public, but the full text was published only in 1989. Not everyone was ready to accept Khrushchev's new line. Communist Albanian leader Enver Hoxha, for instance, strongly condemned Khrushchev as "revisionist" and severed diplomatic relations. The speech was also seen as a catalyst for the anti-Soviet uprisings in Poland and Hungary of 1956, and was seen as a "major stimulus" to the Sino-Soviet split.

A "softened" version of the report was published as a resolution of the Presidium of the CPSU Central Committee on June 30, 1956, entitled "On overcoming the cult of personality and its consequences", which set the framework for acceptable criticism of Stalinism.

According to one journalist of the American newspaper The Washington Post, Anne Applebaum:

The purpose of Khrushchev's report was not only the liberation of his compatriots, but also the consolidation of personal power and intimidation of party opponents, who all also took part [in the repressions] with great enthusiasm.

== See also ==
- Khrushchev's Thaw
