= Lidia Lykova =

Soviet and Russian politician

Lidia Pavlovna Lykova (Russian: Лидия Павловна Лыкова; March 23, 1913 – November 16, 2016) was a Soviet and Russian politician.

She was Minister of Social Affairs from 1961 to 1967, and Vice Chair of the Council of Ministers of the RSFSR from 1967 to 1985.
