= Sovnarkhoz =

Territorial economic management agencies in the Soviet Union

Sovnarkhoz (Russian: совнархоз, совет народного хозяйства, sovet narodnogo khozyaystva, "Council of National Economy"), usually translated as Regional Economic Soviet, was an organization of the Soviet Union to manage a separate economic region. Sovnarkhozes were subordinated to the Supreme Soviet of the National Economy.

Sovnarkhozes were introduced by Nikita Khrushchev in May 1957 in an attempt to combat the centralization and departmentalism of ministries. The USSR was initially divided in 105 economic regions, with sovnarkhozes being operational and planning management; the number was later reduced to 47. Simultaneously, a large number of ministries were shut down.
