= Nikolai Pegov =

Soviet diplomat (1905–1991)

- Николай Пегов
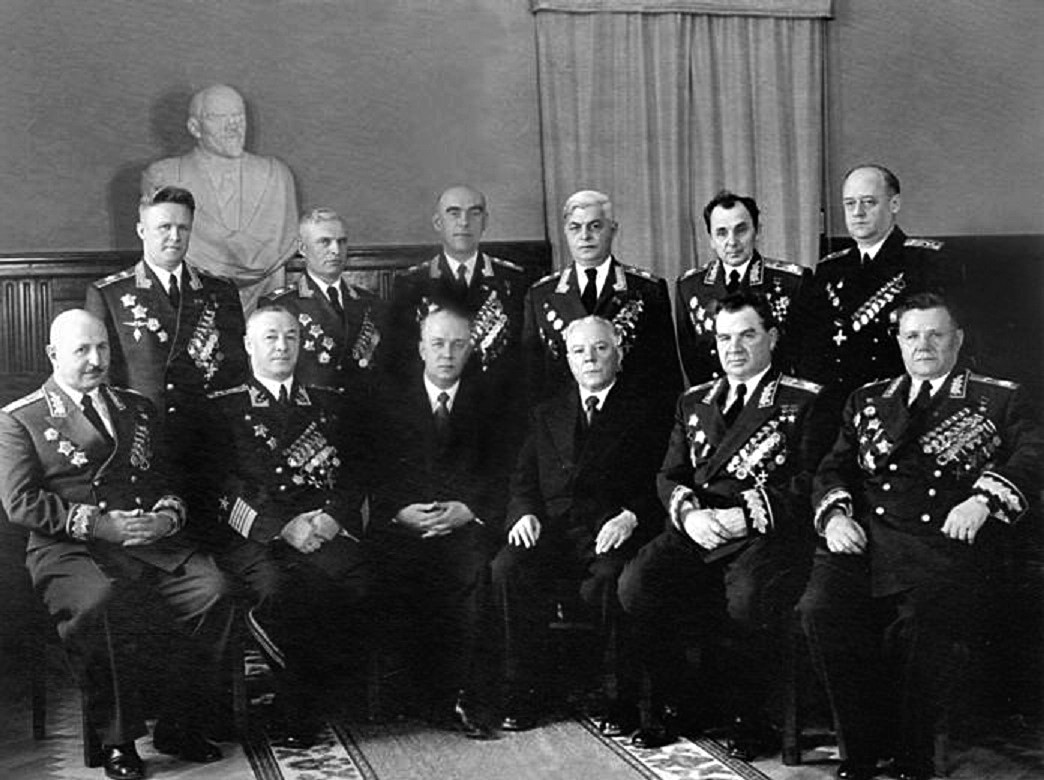
- Pegov (seated third from left) in 1955

Ambassador of the Soviet Union to India
- In office 1967–1973
- Preceded by: Ivan Benediktov

Ambassador of the Soviet Union to Algeria
- In office 1964–1967

Ambassador of the Soviet Union to Iran
- In office 1956–1963

Personal details
- Born: Nikolai Mikhailovich Pegov; 3 April 1905 Moscow, Russian Empire
- Died: 19 April 1991 (aged 86) Moscow, Soviet Union
- Resting place: Novodevichy Cemetery
- Party: Communist Party
- Education: Moscow Industrial Academy

Nikolai Mikhailovich Pegov (Russian: Николай Михайлович Пегов; 3 April 1905 – 19 April 1991) was a Soviet official and diplomat. He served as the ambassador to Iran, Algeria, and India. Being a member of the Communist Party he also held various posts at the party.

== Early years and education ==
Pegov was born in Moscow on 3 April 1905. His father was a clerk. Pegov began to work in 1919 and joined the Communist Party in 1930. He worked at different factories until 1935 when he enrolled at the Moscow Industrial Academy. He graduated from the academy in 1938.

== Career ==
Following his graduation Pegov began his party career and became the secretary of the Far Eastern Regional Committee of the All-Union Communist Party of Bolsheviks. In October 1938 he was appointed first secretary of the Primorsky Regional Committee of the All-Union Communist Party of Bolsheviks and in 1940 he was named as the first secretary of the City Committee of the All-Union Communist Party of Bolsheviks in Vladivostok which he held until 1947. In 1940 he was also made the first secretary of the Vladivostok city committee of the Azerbaijan Communist Party. In addition, he served as the first secretary of the Maritime Territory Committee from 1938 to 1948. He became part of the Communist Party's Central Committee in 1947 and remained in the post until 1952. He served as the secretary of the central committee between 1952 and 1953. Pegov was elected as the secretary of the Presidium of the Supreme Soviet in April 1954 and remained in the post until 1956.

In August 1956 he was named as the ambassador of the Soviet Union to Iran. He served in the post until 1963. One of the significant activities of Pegov during his term as ambassador to Iran was the Iran–Soviet Memorandum concerning the sovereign rights of two countries in the Caspian Sea. This agreement is also known as Aram-Pegov agreement (Aram refers to Abbas Aram, Iranian foreign minister and Iranian signatory of the document), and was signed on 15 September 1962. Then Pegov was appointed Soviet ambassador to Algeria in 1964 which he held until 1967. Pegov was the ambassador of India between 1967 and 1973. He was appointed deputy minister of foreign affairs in April 1973 and department head of the Politburo in 1975.

Pegov also held various posts at the Communist Party. He was a member of the central committee at the 18th through 25th congresses. He functioned as a candidate member of the central committee Presidium between 1952 and 1953 and as a deputy to the 1st through 4th convocations of the Supreme Soviet. In December 1982 he retired from politics and public posts.

== Death ==
Pegov died in Moscow on 19 April 1991 and was buried there at the Novodevichy Cemetery.

=== Awards ===
Pegov was the recipient of the Order of Lenin four times and the Order of the October Revolution.
