= Shahumyan =

Shahumyan may refer to:

- Shahumyan, Ararat, Armenia
- Shahumyan, Armavir, Armenia
- Shahumyan, Lori, Armenia
- Shahumyan, Yerevan, Armenia
- Shahumyan or Shaumyanovsk in Soviet Azerbaijan, previously Nerkinshen, in 1992 renamed into Aşağı Ağcakənd (in Azerbaijan)
- Shahumyan Province, administrative region of the Nagorno-Karabach Republic
- Stepan Shahumyan (1878–1918), Armenian Bolshevik revolutionary and politician

== See also ==
- Shaumyan (disambiguation)
