= Khan Kandi =

Khan Kandi or Khankandi (Persian: خان كندي) may refer to various places in Iran:

- Khan Kandi, Germi, Ardabil Province
- Khankandi, Meshgin Shahr, Ardabil Province
- Khan Kandi, Namin, Ardabil Province
- Khan Kandi, Ahar, East Azerbaijan Province
- Khan Kandi, Kaleybar, East Azerbaijan Province
- Khan Kandi, Kurdistan
- Khan Kandi, West Azerbaijan
- Khan Kandi, Chaldoran, West Azerbaijan Province

== See also ==
- Xankəndi (disambiguation)
