= Imeni Shaumyana =

Imeni Shaumyana may refer to:

- Shahumyan, Lori, Armenia
- Shahumyan, Yerevan, Armenia
- Şaumyanovka, Azerbaijan
- Selo imeni Shaumyana, Dagestan, Russia
