= Shaumyan =

Shaumyan may refer to:

- Shaumyan (surname)
- Shaumyan, Dashkasan, Azerbaijan
- Aşağı Ağcakənd, Azerbaijan - formerly called Shaumyan
- Xankəndi, Shamakhi, Azerbaijan - formerly called Shaumyan(abad)
- Shaumyan, Russia, several rural localities in Russia

== See also ==
- Shahumyan (disambiguation)
