= Shaumyan (surname) =

Shaumyan, Shahumyan or Shaumian (Armenian: Շահումյան) is an Armenian surname. Notable people with the surname include:

- Sebastian Shaumyan (1916–2007), Armenian linguist
- Stepan Shaumian (1878–1918), Armenian Bolshevik commissar
- Lev Shaumyan (1904–1971), Soviet academic and journalist
- Tatyana Shaumyan (b. 1938), Soviet and Russian orientalist
