= Pospelov =

Pospelov (masculine, Russian: Поспелов) or Pospelova (feminine, Russian: Поспелова) is a Russian surname. Notable people with the surname include:

- Aleksandra Pospelova (born 1998), Russian tennis player
- Maria V. Pospelova-Shtrom (1902–1991), Russian parasitologist
- Pyotr Pospelov (1898–1979), Soviet scientist and functionary
  - Pospelov Commission
- Svetlana Pospelova (born 1979), Russian sprinter
- Dmytro Pospyelov (born 1991), Ukrainian soccer player
