= Məmişlər =

Məmişlər or Mamishlar or Mamyshlyar may refer to:

- Məmişlər, Sabirabad, Azerbaijan
- Məmişlər, Shusha, Azerbaijan
- Məmişlər, Dmanisi, Georgia
