= Shvernik Commission =

Investigation during de-Stalinization

Shvernik Commission (Shvernik's Commission, Russian: комиссия Шверника) was an informal name of the commission of the CPSU Central Committee Presidium headed by Nikolay Shvernik for the investigation of political repression in the Soviet Union during the period of Stalin. Other members were Alexander Shelepin, Zinovy Serdyuk, Roman Rudenko, Olga Shatunovskaya, Nikolai Mironov, and Vladimir Semichastny.

It was the second major commission of the kind. (The first one was the commission headed by Vyacheslav Molotov.) The commission worked from 1961 to 1963 and produced about 200 pages of two reports, which detailed the mechanism of falsification of the show trials against Bukharin, Zinoviev, Tukhachevsky and many others. The commission based its findings in large part on eyewitness testimonies of former NKVD workers and victims of repressions, and on many documents. Although it largely failed to prove any of its claims. The commission, under the influence of Khrushchev, recommended to rehabilitate every accused with the exception of Karl Radek and Genrikh Yagoda, because Radek's materials required some further checking, and Yagoda was a criminal and one of the falsifiers of the trials.
