= Imeni Beriya =

Imeni Beriya may refer to:

- Shahumyan, Yerevan, Armenia
- Zhdanov, Armavir, Armenia
