= Lev Shaumyan =

Soviet academic (1904–1971)

- Лев Шаумян; Լև Շահումյան
- Born: April 25, 1904; Tiflis, Tiflis Governorate, Russian Empire
- Died: May 24, 1971 (aged 67); Moscow, Russian SFSR, Soviet Union
- Education: Sverdlov Communist University
- Awards: Order of Lenin, Honoured Cultural Worker of the RSFSR

Lev Stepanovich Shaumyan (Armenian: Լևոն Ստեփանի Շահումյան; Russian: Лев Степанович Шаумян; April 25, 1904, Tiflis – May 24, 1971, Moscow) was a Soviet academic and journalist of Armenian background.

== Early life and career ==
Born in Tiflis, Shaumyan was the son of the Bolshevik revolutionary Stepan Shaumian. After the fall of the Baku Commune, he was arrested and held in prison together with the 26 Baku Commissars. A member of the CPSU since 1919, he was engaged in underground party work in Baku and Tiflis in 1919–1920. In 1922–1923, he studied at the Sverdlov Communist University in Moscow, where he also married. In 1924–1932, he was engaged in party work in Tsaritsyn and Rostov-on-Don. In 1932–1946, he headed the editorial boards of a number of newspapers in various cities, including Rostov-on-Don, Chelyabinsk, Leningrad, and Moscow. During the Great Patriotic War, he served as editor-in-chief of the newspaper The Ural Worker. From 1948 to 1949, he was on the editorial board of Literaturnaya Gazeta and served as its executive secretary.

== Thaw and de-Stalinization ==
In 1949, Shaumyan began work at the Sovetskaya Entsiklopediya publishing house and in 1959, he became the first deputy editor-in-chief of the Great Soviet Encyclopedia. During the Khrushchev Thaw, Shaumyan played an important role in assisting Nikita Khrushchev and Anastas Mikoyan on de-Stalinization and rehabilitations. At his Moscow apartment, he hosted Gulag survivors such as Olga Shatunovskaya and Alexei Snegov. Mikoyan once praised Shaumyan for his "inestimable contribution to the cause of correcting subjective distortions in the history of the Party and for restoring the memory of those outstanding revolutionaries who fell victim to the cult of personality and who were then completely rehabilitated." Shaumyan was awarded the Order of Lenin, and Honoured Cultural Worker of the RSFSR. He was the father of Tatyana Shaumyan.
