= Alexei Snegov =

Old Bolshevik (1898–1989)

- Алексей Владимирович Снегов
- Born: Iosif Izrailevich Falikzon; 1898; Kiev, Kiev Governorate, Russian Empire (now Kyiv, Ukraine)
- Died: September 18, 1989; Moscow, Russian SFSR, Soviet Union
- Citizenship: Russian Empire; Soviet Union
- Occupations: Revolutionary; politician; political prisoner
- Political party: CPSU

Alexei Vladimirovich Snegov (Russian: Алексей Владимирович Снегов; 1898, Kiev – 18 September 1989, Moscow) was a prominent Old Bolshevik and Soviet political figure. A survivor of the Gulag, he is best known for his role in de-Stalinization as an advisor to Nikita Khrushchev during the Khrushchev Thaw.

== Early career and arrest ==
Born in Kiev in 1898, Snegov was a member of the Bolsheviks since April 1917. In his early party career, he was involved in underground activities in Vinnytsia and Podolia. During the Russian Civil War in Ukraine, he served as the executive secretary of the Podolia Governorate. During the NEP period, he was involved in party work in Ukraine and became a member of the Ukrainian central committee in June 1930. Throughout the 1930s, he held various party positions in Tbilisi, Irkutsk, Chelyabinsk, Chapayevsk, and Murmansk. In Tbilisi, he "worked briefly" with Lavrentiy Beria.

Snegov was arrested in June 1937 during Joseph Stalin's Great Purge, but was then acquitted and released following the arrest of Nikolai Yezhov. He came to Moscow to get his party card back and sought the assistance of Anastas Mikoyan who advised him to immediately leave Moscow and go on vacation in Sochi. However, Snegov did not take Mikoyan's advice and "adamantly refused to leave for Sochi until his Party card was returned." He was subsequently arrested again on January 4, 1939, and spent over 15 years in the Gulag.

== Rehabilitation and de-Stalinization ==
In 1953, Snegov sent Mikoyan a letter "denouncing Beria's crimes" addressed to Nikita Khrushchev. He was subsequently recalled from the camps to testify against Beria at his trial. As Sheila Fitzpatrick noted, during the trial, Beria "reportedly recognized him [Snegov] and called out, 'Are you still alive?,' to which Snegov, also using the familiar form of address, responded, 'Lousy work on the part of your police'." After a brief return to exile, Snegov was officially rehabilitated on March 6, 1954. He then moved to Moscow where he became an advisor to Khrushchev and Mikoyan on de-Stalinization.

Along with Lev Shaumyan and Gulag survivor Olga Shatunovskaya, Snegov was actively involved in the rehabilitation of the victims of Stalin's repressions. He advocated a deep de-Stalinization of the USSR and strongly encouraged Khrushchev to denounce Stalin and his cult of personality at the 20th Congress of the Communist Party of the Soviet Union in 1956. Snegov viewed the congress as "decisive." As he stressed to Khrushchev and Mikoyan:

If [you] don't discredit Stalin at this Congress, the first since the tyrant's death, and do not tell about his crimes, [you] will go down in history as his willing accomplices. Only by exposing the role of Stalin can [you] convince the Party that [you] were involuntary participants.

After Khrushchev's fall, Snegov went into retirement in 1964 for "reasons of age and health." In the Brezhnev years, Snegov "devoted his efforts to researching and writing an anti-Stalin book" and "became acquainted with Roy Medvedev." He became "a special target of vindictive reprisals," especially from Mikhail Suslov, "whose complicity in the terror Snegov had uncovered." In 1967, Snegov was briefly expelled from the Communist Party for "continuing to speak out among historians about Stalin's crimes." However, he was reinstated that same year.

== Bibliography ==
- Adler, Nanci (2012). Keeping Faith with the Party: Communist Believers Return from the Gulag. Bloomington: Indiana University Press. ISBN 9780253357229.
- Cohen, Stephen F. (2011). The Victims Return: Survivors of the Gulag After Stalin. London: I.B. Tauris. ISBN 9781848858480.
- Fitzpatrick, Sheila (2015). On Stalin's Team: The Years of Living Dangerously in Soviet Politics. Princeton: Princeton University Press. ISBN 978-0691145334.
- Medvedev, Roy A. (1984). All Stalin's Men. Translated by Harold Shukman. Garden City, NY: Doubleday. ISBN 9780385190626.
- Shakarian, Pietro A. (2025). Anastas Mikoyan: An Armenian Reformer in Khrushchev's Kremlin. Bloomington: Indiana University Press. ISBN 978-0253073556.
- Smith, Kathleen E. (2017). Moscow 1956: The Silenced Spring. Cambridge, MA: Harvard University Press. ISBN 9780674972001.
- Taubman, William (2003). Khrushchev: The Man and His Era. New York: W. W. Norton & Company. ISBN 9780393324846.
