= De-Stalinization =

Political reforms after Stalin's death

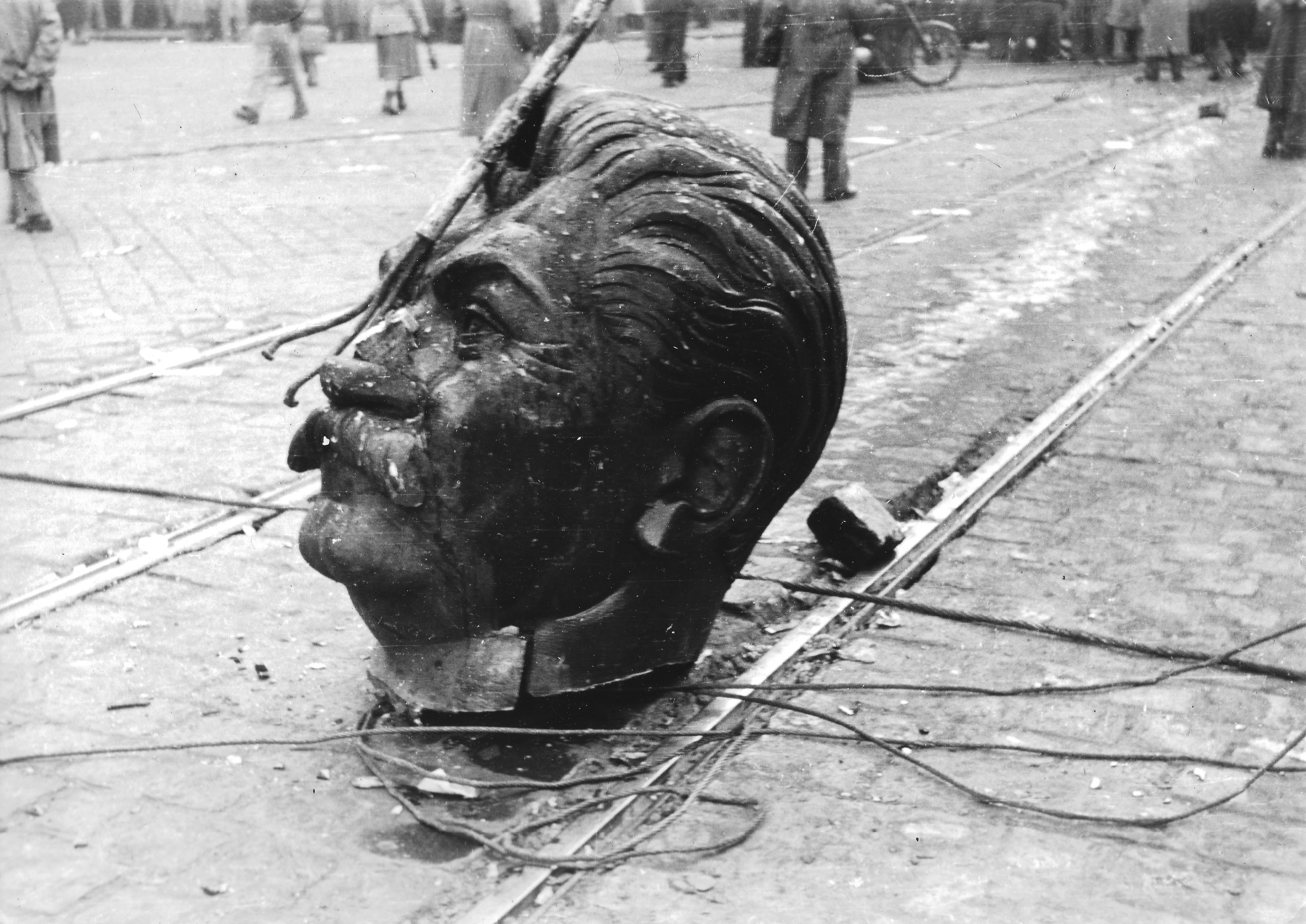
A badly-damaged head of the Stalin Monument in Budapest during the Hungarian Revolution of 1956

De-Stalinization (Russian: десталинизация, romanized: destalinizatsiya) comprised a series of political reforms in the Soviet Union after the death of long-time leader Joseph Stalin in 1953, and the thaw brought about by the ascension of Nikita Khrushchev to power, and his 1956 speech "On the Cult of Personality and Its Consequences", which denounced Stalin's cult of personality and the Stalinist political system.

Monuments to Stalin were removed, his name was removed from places, buildings, and the state anthem, and his body was removed from the Lenin Mausoleum (known as the Lenin and Stalin Mausoleum from 1953 to 1961) and buried. These reforms were started by the collective leadership which succeeded him after his death on 5 March 1953, comprising Georgi Malenkov, Premier of the Soviet Union; Lavrentiy Beria, head of the Ministry of the Interior; and Nikita Khrushchev, First Secretary of the Central Committee of the Communist Party of the Soviet Union (CPSU).

== Terminology issues ==
The term de-Stalinization is one which gained currency in both Russia and the Western world following the dissolution of the Soviet Union, but was never used during the Khrushchev era. However, de-Stalinization efforts were set forth at this time by Khrushchev and the Government of the Soviet Union under the guise of the "overcoming/exposure of the cult of personality", with a heavy criticism of Joseph Stalin's "era of the cult of personality". However, prior to Khrushchev's "Secret Speech" to the 20th Party Congress, no direct association between Stalin as a person and "the cult of personality" was openly made by Khrushchev or others within the party, although archival documents show that strong criticism of Stalin and his ideology featured in private discussions by Khrushchev at the Presidium of the Supreme Soviet.

== Silent de-Stalinization ==
De-Stalinization meant an end to the role of large-scale forced labour in the economy. The process of freeing Gulag prisoners was started by Lavrentiy Beria. He was removed from power, arrested on 26 June 1953, and executed on 23 December 1953. A period of "silent de-Stalinization" subsequently took place, as the revision of Stalin's policies was done in secret, and often with no explanation. There were dangers in denouncing Stalin as he was placed on a pedestal both at home and among communists abroad. This period saw a number of non-publicized political rehabilitations, by way of persons and groups such as Marshal Mikhail Tukhachevsky, Politburo members Robert Eikhe and Jānis Rudzutaks, those executed in the Leningrad Affair, and the release of "Article 58ers". However, due to the huge influx of prisoners returning from the camps (90,000 prisoners in 1954–55 alone), this could not continue.

Anastas Mikoyan, a close ally of Khrushchev, played a significant role in the early de-Stalinization process. In March 1954, he called for the rehabilitation of the poet Yeghishe Charents, a victim of the Purges, in a speech in Yerevan in his native Armenia. He subsequently played a leading role in the rehabilitation of political prisoners, and worked with Lev Shaumyan (son of Bolshevik revolutionary Stepan Shaumian) and Gulag returnees Alexei Snegov and Olga Shatunovskaya to convince Khrushchev of the necessity of denouncing Stalin. In December 1955, Khrushchev proposed that a commission be set up in order to investigate Stalin's activities on behalf of the Presidium. This investigation determined that out of the 1,920,635 arrested for anti-Soviet activities, 688,503 (35.8 per cent) were executed.

== Khrushchev's Secret Speech ==
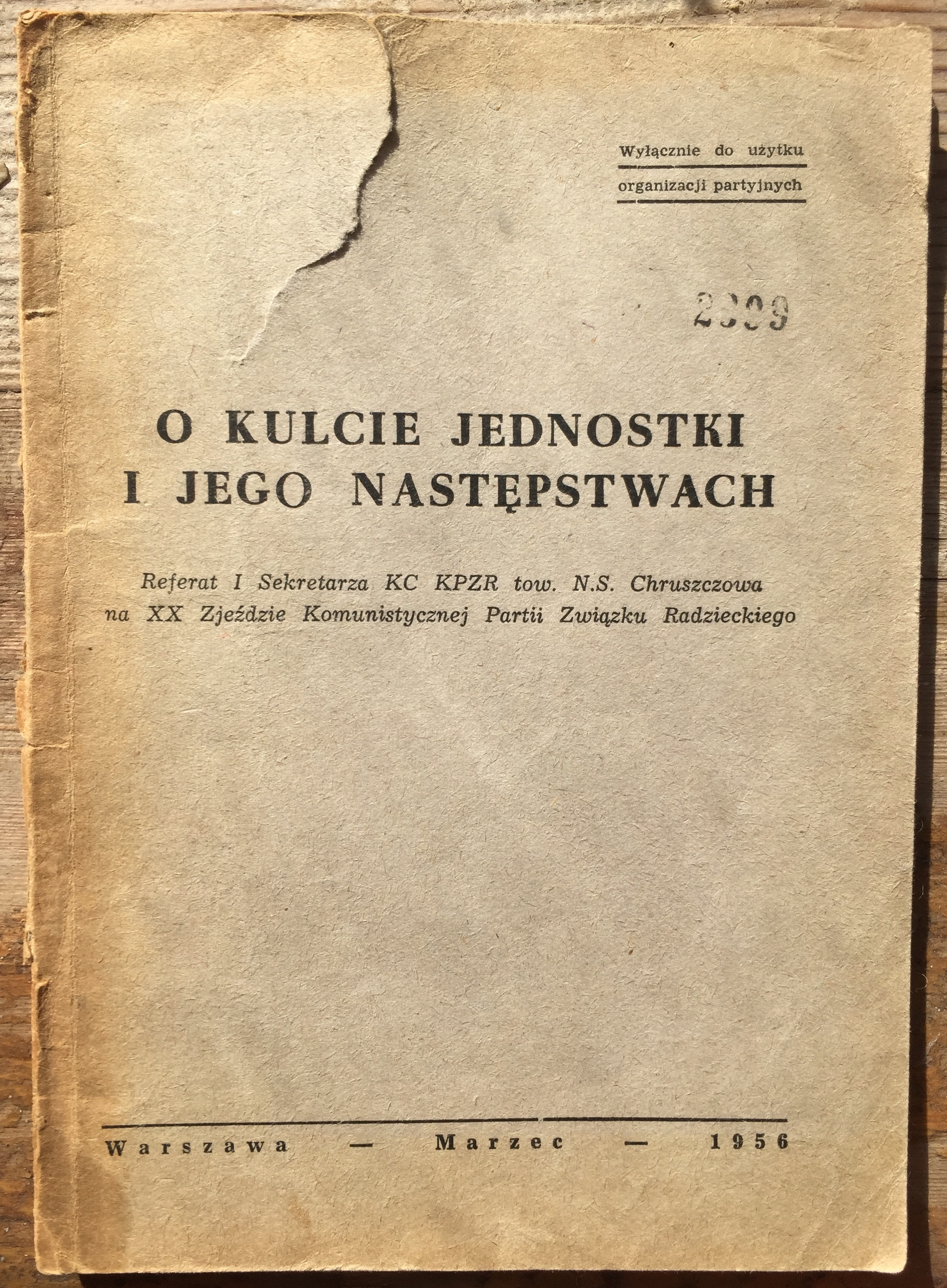
O kulcie jednostki i jego następstwach, Warsaw, March 1956, first edition of the Secret Speech, published for the inner use in the Polish United Workers' Party

While de-Stalinization had been quietly underway ever since Stalin's death, the watershed event was Khrushchev's speech, "On the Cult of Personality and Its Consequences", concerning Stalin. On 25 February 1956, de-Stalinization became official when he spoke to a closed session of the 20th Party Congress of the Communist Party of the Soviet Union, delivering an address laying out some of Stalin's crimes and the "conditions of insecurity, fear, and even desperation" created by Stalin. Khrushchev shocked his listeners by denouncing Stalin's dictatorial rule and his cult of personality as inconsistent with communist and Party ideology. Among other points, he condemned the treatment of the Old Bolsheviks, people who had supported communism before the revolution, many of whom Stalin had executed as traitors. Khrushchev also attacked the crimes committed by associates of NKVD chief Lavrentiy Beria.

=== Motivation ===
One reason given for Khrushchev's speech was his moral conscience; Aleksandr Solzhenitsyn said that Khrushchev spoke out of a "movement of the heart". This, the Communists believed, would prevent a fatal loss of self-belief and restore unity within the Party.

Historian Martin McCauley argues that Khrushchev's purpose was to "liberate Party officials from the fear of repression". Khrushchev argued that if the Party were to be an efficient mechanism, stripped from the brutal abuse of power by any individual, it could transform the Soviet Union as well as the entire world.

However, others have suggested that the speech was made in order to deflect blame from the Communist Party or the principles of Marxism–Leninism and place the blame squarely on Stalin's shoulders, thus preventing a more radical debate. The publication of this speech caused many party members to resign in protest, both abroad and within the Soviet Union.

By attacking Stalin, McCauley argues, he was undermining the credibility of Vyacheslav Molotov, Georgy Malenkov, Lazar Kaganovich and other political opponents who had been within "Stalin's inner circle" during the 1930s more than he had been. If they did not "come over to Khrushchev", they "risk[ed] being banished with Stalin" and associated with his dictatorial control.

On the other hand, historian A. M. Amzad argues that the speech was "deliberate" and "was designed to determine Khrushchev's political fate", as, according to him, necessary initiatives were already taken "to resolve the ills of Stalin's dictatorship".

=== Reactions ===
The speech is central to the period of liberalization known as the "Khrushchev Thaw" in the Soviet bloc and to the process of de-Stalinization. It was cited as a major cause of the Sino-Soviet split of 1961 to 1989 by China (under Chairman Mao Zedong) and by Albania (under First Secretary Enver Hoxha), who condemned Khrushchev as a revisionist. In response, they formed the anti-revisionist movement, criticizing the post-Stalin leadership of the Communist Party of the Soviet Union for allegedly deviating from the path of Lenin and Stalin. In North Korea, factions of the Workers' Party of Korea unsuccessfully attempted to remove Chairman Kim Il Sung in August 1956, having criticized Kim for not "correcting" his leadership methods, for developing a personality cult, for distorting the "Leninist principle of collective leadership and socialist legality" (i.e. using arbitrary arrest and executions of political opponents) and using other Khrushchev-era criticisms of Stalinism against Kim Il Sung's actions. They were later purged and executed.

== Changes ==
=== Prisons ===
The amnesty of 1953 and the subsequent rehabilitation processes began the release of most prisoners. Former political prisoners often faced ingrained hostility upon their return, which made it difficult to reintegrate into normal life. On 25 October 1956, a resolution of the CPSU declared that the existence of the Gulag labour system was "inexpedient". The Gulag institution was closed by the Ministry of Internal Affairs (MVD) order No 020 of 25 January 1960.

For those who remained, Khrushchev attempted to make the Gulag labour system less harsh, by allowing prisoners to post letters home to their families, and by allowing family members to mail clothes to prisoners, which was not allowed under Stalin.

=== Renaming of places and buildings ===
Khrushchev renamed or reverted the names of many places bearing Stalin's name, including cities, territories, landmarks, and other facilities. The State Anthem of the Soviet Union was purged of references to Stalin, and so were the anthems of its republics. The Stalin-centric and World War II-era lines in the lyrics were effectively excised when an instrumental version replaced it. The Joseph Stalin Palace of Culture and Science in Warsaw, Poland was renamed in 1956. Stalin Peak, the highest point in the USSR, was renamed Communism Peak. After the collapse of the USSR, the mountain was renamed Ismoil Somoni Peak. In East Germany, Stalinstadt was renamed to Eisenhüttenstadt in 1961. In Moscow, the Moscow Metro station Stalinskaya on the Arbatsko-Pokrovskaya line was renamed to Semyonovskaya.

=== Removal of monuments ===
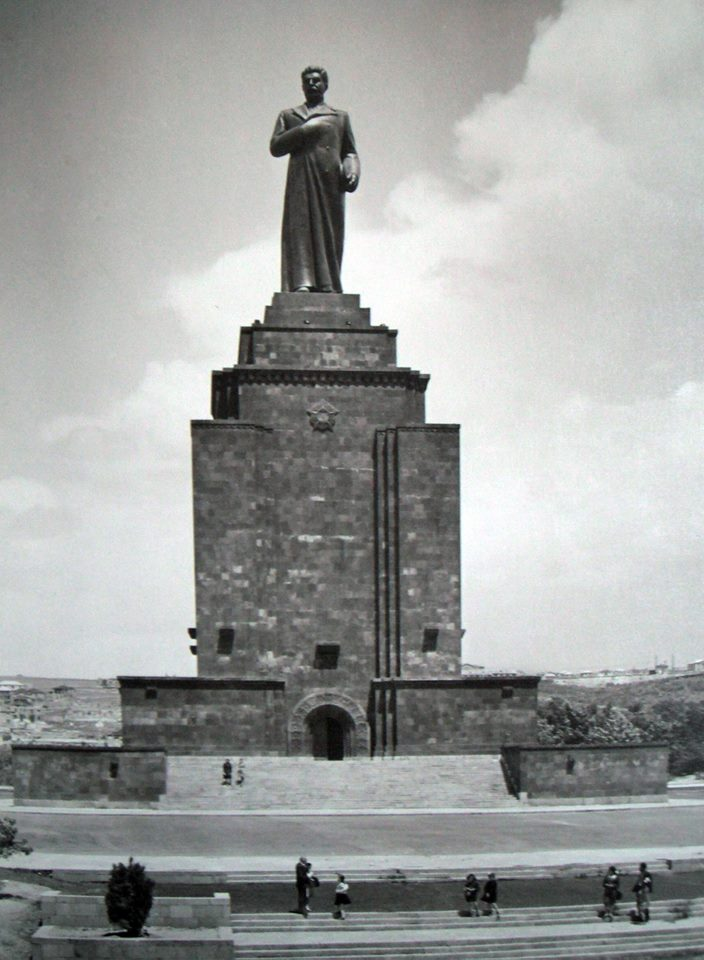
The Statue of Stalin in Yerevan was removed in 1962 and replaced by Mother Armenia in 1967.

Following the momentum of these public renamings, the Soviet government dismantled hundreds of Stalin monuments across the USSR. For example, the monument to Stalin in the Armenian capital Yerevan was removed in spring 1962 and replaced by Mother Armenia in 1967. Several more monuments were dismantled or destroyed across the Eastern Bloc. In November 1961, the large Stalin Statue on Berlin's monumental Stalinallee (promptly renamed Karl-Marx-Allee) was removed in a clandestine operation. The Monument in Budapest was destroyed in October 1956. The biggest one, the Prague monument, was taken down in November 1962.

=== Relocation of Stalin's body ===
The process of de-Stalinization peaked in 1961 during the 22nd Congress of the CPSU. Two climactic acts of de-Stalinization marked the meetings: first, on 31 October 1961, Stalin's body was moved from Lenin's Mausoleum in Red Square to the Kremlin Wall Necropolis; second, on 11 November 1961, the "hero city" Stalingrad was renamed Volgograd.

=== Foreign policy changes after Stalin ===
In the aftermath of the Stalin era, Khrushchev defined Soviet foreign policy during the Cold War. The biggest change to foreign policy dealt with "uncommitted nations". There were two types of neutrality according to the Soviets, those by ideology and those by circumstance. Many of the nations that were neutral came from both of these groups and were former colonies of European powers. During Stalin there was no room for neutral countries and the idea of neutral powers came about under Khrushchev. Khrushchev's biggest contribution to foreign policy was taking advantage of other aspects of de-Stalinisation to try to show the world a different Soviet Union more in line with traditional socialist ideals in Lenin era.

== Extent of de-Stalinization ==
Contemporary historians regard the beginning of de-Stalinization as a turning point in the history of the Soviet Union that began during the Khrushchev Thaw. The de-Stalinization process stalled during the Brezhnev period until the mid-1980s, and accelerated again with the policies of perestroika and glasnost under Mikhail Gorbachev.

De-Stalinization has been considered a fragile process. Historian Polly Jones said that "re-Stalinization" was highly likely after a brief period of "thaw". Anne Applebaum agrees: "The era which came to be called the 'Thaw' was indeed an era of change, but change of a particular kind: reforms took two steps forward, and then one step—or sometimes three steps—back."

== See also ==
- Anti-Stalinist left
- Decommunization
- 1956 Georgian demonstrations
- History of the Soviet Union (1953–1964): de-Stalinzation and the Khrushchev era
- Lenin's Testament
- Neo-Stalinism
- The Battle of Stalingrad
- The Fall of Berlin
- The Third Blow
- The Stalinist Legacy
- The Unforgettable Year 1919
