= Xankəndi (disambiguation) =

Xankəndi or Khankendi may refer to:

- Khankendi – a city in Nagorno Karabakh, Azerbaijan
- Xankəndi, Ismailli – a village in the Ismailli District of Azerbaijan
- Xankəndi, Shamakhi – a village in the Shamakhi District of Azerbaijan

== See also ==
- Khan Kandi (disambiguation)
