= Olga Shatunovskaya =

Old Bolshevik (1901–1990)

- Ольга Григорьевна Шатуно́вская
- Born: Olga Grigoryevna Shatunovskaya; March 1, 1901; Baku, Russian Empire (now Baku, Republic of Azerbaijan)
- Died: November 23, 1990 (aged 89); Moscow, Russian SFSR, Soviet Union
- Burial place: Vvedenskoye Cemetery, Moscow
- Citizenship: Russian Empire; USSR
- Occupations: revolutionary; journalist; politician; political prisoner
- Political party: CPSU
- Children: 3
- Parents: Grigory Naumovich Shatunovsky (father); Victoria Borisovna Shatunovskaya (mother)
- Awards: , USSR, USSR

Olga Grigoryevna Shatunovskaya (Russian: Ольга Григорьевна Шатуновская; 1 March 1901, Baku – 23 November 1990, Moscow) was a prominent Old Bolshevik. A survivor of the Kolyma Gulag, Shatunovskaya played an important role in the implementation of de-Stalinization in the Soviet Union during the Khrushchev Thaw. She was a member of Shvernik Commission created by Nikita Khrushchev to investigate the crimes of Joseph Stalin.

== Early life ==
Shatunovskaya was born in Baku to an "upper-middle-class" Jewish family. Her father, Grigory Shatunovsky (1871–1922), was a lawyer who studied at the Saint Petersburg Imperial University. Her mother, Victoria Borisovna Shatunovskaya (1876–1957), was a housewife. In 1913, Shatunovskaya entered the Mariinsky Girls' Gymnasium in Baku. In 1915, she began attending Marxist circles. In January 1916, she joined the Russian Social Democratic Labour Party.

== Baku Commune ==
After the October Revolution, Shatunovskaya left home, and joined the Bolshevik Party Committee of Baku. A close associate of Anastas Mikoyan, she served as the secretary of Stepan Shaumian within the Baku Commune. After the fall of Soviet power in Baku, she remained in the city to carry out underground work. In September 1918, after the entry of Turkish forces into Baku and the execution of 26 Baku commissars, Shatunovskaya was arrested and sentenced by the Turkish command to death by hanging, but "her death sentence was commuted at the last minute."

In December 1918, Shatunovskaya took part in the Transcaucasian underground conference of the Bolsheviks near Tiflis. In April 1919, she returned from Tiflis to Baku, where from July to November 1919 she was the editor of newspapers published in the Baku underground.

== Early career and arrest ==
In 1920, Shatunovskaya became the secretary of the Baku Komsomol and the secretary of district party committees in Baku. From 1921 to 1925, she engaged in party work in the Bryansk Oblast and Siberia. In 1925, she returned to Soviet Azerbaijan where she served as head of the department of the Bailovo regional committee and then secretary of the Baku district committee.

In 1931, Shatunovskaya began work for the Moscow Party Committee, where she "met and befriended" Nikita Khrushchev. However, during the Great Purge, she was arrested in November 1937 and sentenced to eight years hard labor in the Kolyma Gulag for "counterrevolutionary" activities by an NKVD troika. Released in 1946, she "made her way back to Moscow," but left in 1948 when Mikoyan "warned her to flee as a new wave of arrests loomed." She was arrested again in Kazakhstan in April 1949 and exiled to the Krasnoyarsk Krai.

== Rehabilitation and de-Stalinization ==
After Stalin's death in 1953, Shatunovskaya appealed to Khrushchev. In response, Khrushchev personally assisted her rehabilitation and "had his aide phone the procuracy daily to check on the progress" of her case. Shatunovskaya was officially rehabilitated in May 1954 and her membership in the Communist Party was restored that same year. After her rehabilitation, Shatunovskaya met Mikoyan at the apartment of Lev Shaumyan and detailed her experiences of the Gulag. Through Mikoyan's intercession, she then met with Khrushchev and spoke with him "for more than three hours."

By the end of 1954, Khrushchev appointed Shatunovskaya to the Soviet Party Control Committee and a special commission on rehabilitations. He further appointed her to the Shvernik Commission. She also served as the chief investigator of the Kirov murder. As "Khrushchev's zeks" (former political prisoners), Shatunovskaya and Gulag survivor Alexei Snegov "used their remarkable access to Khrushchev and Mikoyan to push for sweeping relief for survivors of repression." However, both would "struggle throughout the Khrushchev era and beyond to keep victims on the agenda." Shatunovskaya retired in May 1962.

== Bibliography ==
- Adler, Nanci (2012). Keeping Faith with the Party: Communist Believers Return from the Gulag. Bloomington: Indiana University Press. ISBN 9780253357229.
- Cohen, Stephen F. (2011). The Victims Return: Survivors of the Gulag After Stalin. London: I.B. Tauris. ISBN 9781848858480.
- Fitzpatrick, Sheila (2015). On Stalin's Team: The Years of Living Dangerously in Soviet Politics. Princeton: Princeton University Press. ISBN 978-0691145334.
- Shakarian, Pietro A. (2025). Anastas Mikoyan: An Armenian Reformer in Khrushchev's Kremlin. Bloomington: Indiana University Press. ISBN 978-0253073556.
- Smith, Kathleen E. (2017). Moscow 1956: The Silenced Spring. Cambridge, MA: Harvard University Press. ISBN 9780674972001.

== Memoirs ==
- Shatunovskaya, Olga Grigoryevna (2001). Kutyina, Gianna (ed.). Об ушедшем веке: Рассказывает Ольга Шатуновская [About the Bygone Century: Olga Shatunovskaya Talks] (in Russian). La Jolla, California: DAA Books. ISBN 9783000042089 – via Sakharov Center, Moscow.
