= Pyotr Pospelov =

Soviet politician, propagandist, and scientist (1898–1979)

- Пётр Поспелов
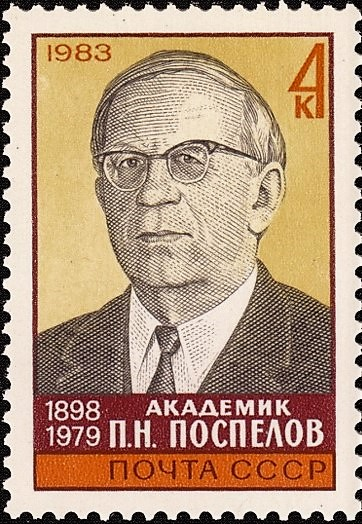

Director of the Institute of Marxism–Leninism of the Central Committee
- In office 25 January 1961 – May 1967
- Preceded by: Gennady Obichkin
- Succeeded by: Pyotr Fedoseyev
- In office 7 July 1949 – July 1952
- Preceded by: Vladimir Kruzhkov
- Succeeded by: Gennady Obichkin

Editor-in-chief of Pravda
- In office 1940–1949
- Preceded by: Ivan Niktin
- Succeeded by: Mikhail Suslov

Candidate member of the 20th–21st Presidium
- In office 29 June 1957 – 17 October 1961

Member of the 19th, 20th–21st Secretariat
- In office 5 March 1953 – 4 May 1960

Personal details
- Born: Pyotr Nikolayevich Pospelov; 20 June 1898 Kuznetsovo, Korcheva Uyezd, Tver Governorate, Russian Empire
- Died: 22 April 1979 (aged 80) Moscow, Soviet Union
- Party: Communist Party (1916–1979)

Pyotr Nikolayevich Pospelov (Russian: Пётр Никола́евич Поспе́лов; 20 June [O.S. 8 June] 1898 – 22 April 1979) was a high-ranked functionary of the Communist Party of the Soviet Union, propagandist, academician of the USSR Academy of Sciences (1953), chief editor of Pravda newspaper, and director of the Institute of Marxism-Leninism. He was known as a staunch Stalinist who quickly became a supporter of Nikita Khrushchev after the latter's Secret Speech.

== Life and career ==
Pospelov was born at Konakovo in 1898. He joined the Bolsheviks as a student, in 1916, and in 1917, he was secretary of the Tver textile workers' union. During 1918–19, he worked for the Bolshevik underground in Chelyabinsk, which was then controlled by the White Army. He was based in Tver again, in 1920, until 1924, when he was transferred to the Agitprop department of the Central Committee. The party machine was then already controlled by Joseph Stalin, whom Pospelov loyally supported until Stalin's death in 1953. In 1926–30, he studied at the Communist Academy in Moscow, and then in the Economics Department of the Institute of Red Professors in 1930. In 1930–39, he was a member of the Central Control Commission and its successor, the Party Control Commission.

Pospelov was one of the principal authors of The History of the Communist Party of the Soviet Union (Bolsheviks): Short Course, which served as a basic text on party history in the Stalinist period.

Early in the Great Purge, on 13 March 1937, just after two of Lenin's former closest comrades, Nikolai Bukharin and Alexei Rykov had been arrested, Pravda gave prominence to an article signed by Pospelov, headed 'The Struggle of Bukharin and Rykov against Lenin and the party', accusing them of criminal links with Leon Trotsky

In 1937–40, he was appointed deputy head of Agitprop, which was headed by Andrei Zhdanov. He was a member of the Central Committee, 1939–1971. In September 1940, he was appointed chief editor of Pravda, but was sacked in August 1949, and replaced by Mikhail Suslov, at a time when dozens of officials who had been linked to Zhdanov were losing their jobs in a purge carried out by Zhdanov's former rival, Georgy Malenkov. He held the lesser post of Director of the Marx–Engels–Lenin–Stalin Institute, in 1949–52. Early in 1953, he was reinstated as deputy chief editor of Pravda.

On 6 March 1953, just after the death of Stalin, Pospelov was appointed a Secretary of the Central Committee. In the power struggles of the early 1950s, he backed Nikita Khrushchev against Malenkov.

Pospelov was reputedly so upset when Stalin died that he started sobbing, until the police chief, Lavrentiy Beria shook him, exclaiming "What's the matter with you? Cut it out!," while also playing a prominent role in the dismantling of Stalin's reputation. Speaking to the USSR Academy of Sciences on 19 October 1953, Pospelov was one of the first to publicly attack the 'Cult of the Personality'.

Khrushchev revealed in his memoirs that in 1954, Pospelov was put in charge of what became known as the "Pospelov commission" which investigated cases of loyal party officials who had been the mass repressions in the Soviet Union, and that he wrote the speech, On the Personality Cult and its Consequences, which Khrushchev delivered during a closed session of the 20th Party Congress, in 1956. Khrushchev claimed that he had even proposed that Pospelov should deliver it, but was talked into delivering it himself. During the 21st Party Congress, in February, 1959, Pospelov delivered a speech in which he denounced Malenkov and his allies as a "wretched group of bankrupts, splitters and fractionists."

Pospelov lost his position as a secretary of the Central Committee in May 1960, at a time when hardliners such as Suslov had forced Khrushchev to take a harder line against the west, in the wake of the shooting down of the U2 pilot, Gary Powers. In 1961–67, Pospelov returned to his former role as Director of the Marx-Engels-Lenin Institute.

Despite his part in the process of de-Stalinisation, in a 1969, article in the Kommunist, Pospelov praised Stalin as bulwark of party unity in the face of the "anti-Leninist" challenge of Trotskyism, writing that

It was only because the Leninist party and its Central Committee, headed by J. V. Stalin, were able ideologically and politically to defeat Trotskyism as an anti-Leninist current, it was only because the entire party rose to the defense of the Leninist doctrine, that the party unity was preserved, and that the split desired by the Trotskyites was prevented and the Communist Party led the Soviet people to the victory of socialism in our country.

Pospelov died in Moscow in 1979, and was buried at the Novodevichy Cemetery.

== Awards ==
- 6 Orders of Lenin
- Order of the October Revolution
- Order of the Patriotic War of 2nd degree
- Order of Friendship of Peoples
- Hero of Socialist Labor (1958)
- Stalin Prize (1943)
