= Khan Kandi, Kurdistan =

Khan Kandi خان كندي
- Village
- Location within Iran
- Coordinates: 36°17′31″N 47°23′52″E
- Country: Iran
- Province: Kurdistan
- County: Bijar
- Bakhsh: Korani
- Rural District: Taghamin

Population (2006)
  - Total: 107
- Time zone: UTC+3:30 (IRST)
  - Summer (DST): UTC+4:30 (IRDT)

Khan Kandi (Persian: خان كندي, also Romanized as Khān Kandī) is a village in Taghamin Rural District, Korani District, Bijar County, Kurdistan province, Iran. At the 2006 census, its population was 107, in 23 families. The village is populated by Azerbaijanis.
