= Shahumyan, Ararat =

Village in Ararat, Armenia

Shahumyan Շահումյան
- Location within Armenia Location within Ararat
- Coordinates: 39°55′51″N 44°34′42″E
- Country: Armenia
- Province: Ararat
- Municipality: Artashat

Population (2011)
  - Total: 3,752
- Time zone: UTC+4
  - Summer (DST): UTC+5

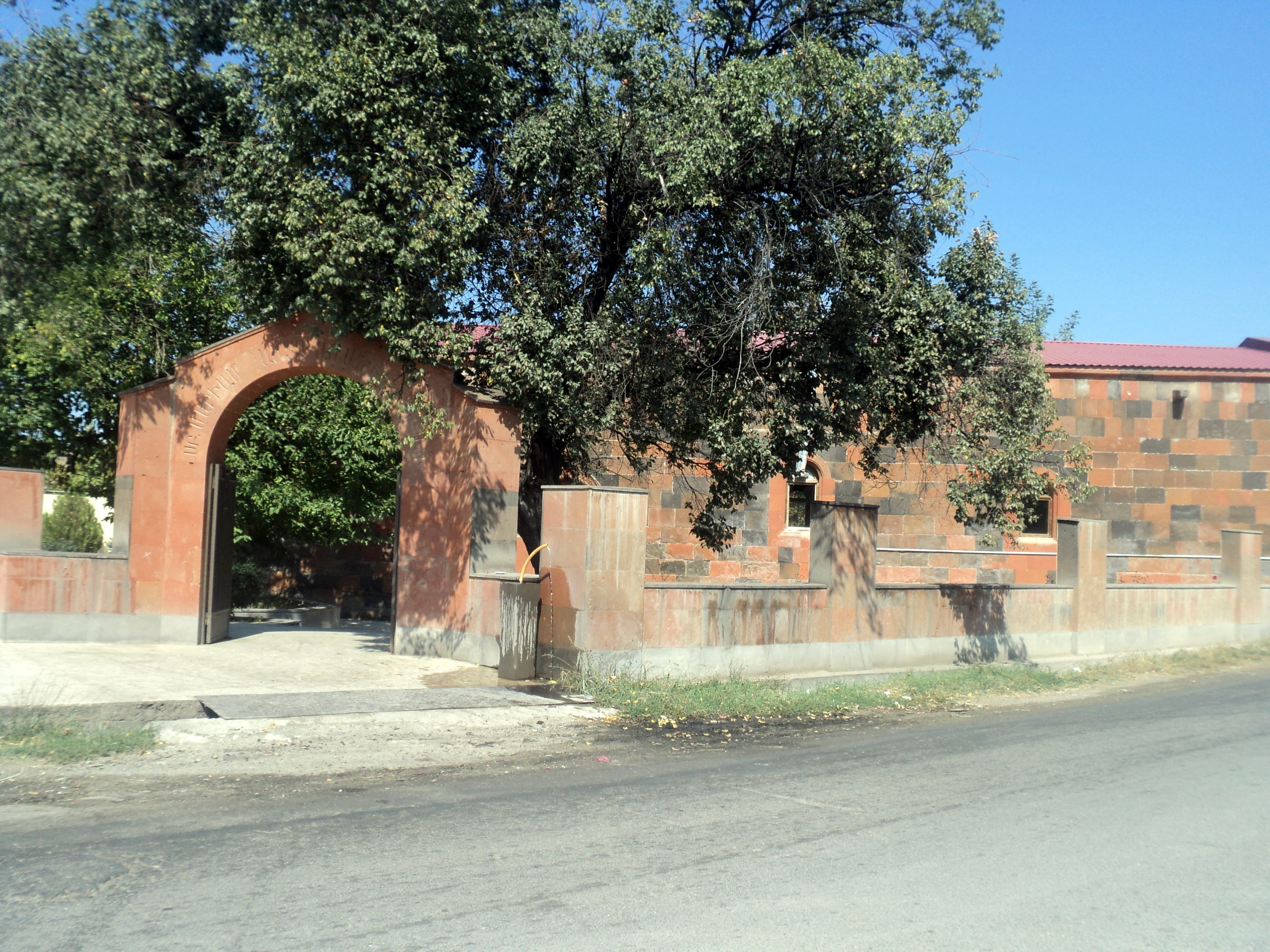
St Mary Church, Shahumyan

Shahumyan (Armenian: Շահումյան) is a village in the Artashat Municipality of the Ararat Province of Armenia. It is named after Stepan Shahumyan, a Bolshevik commissar.
