= Shahumyan, Armavir =

Village in Armavir, Armenia

Shahumyan Շահումյան
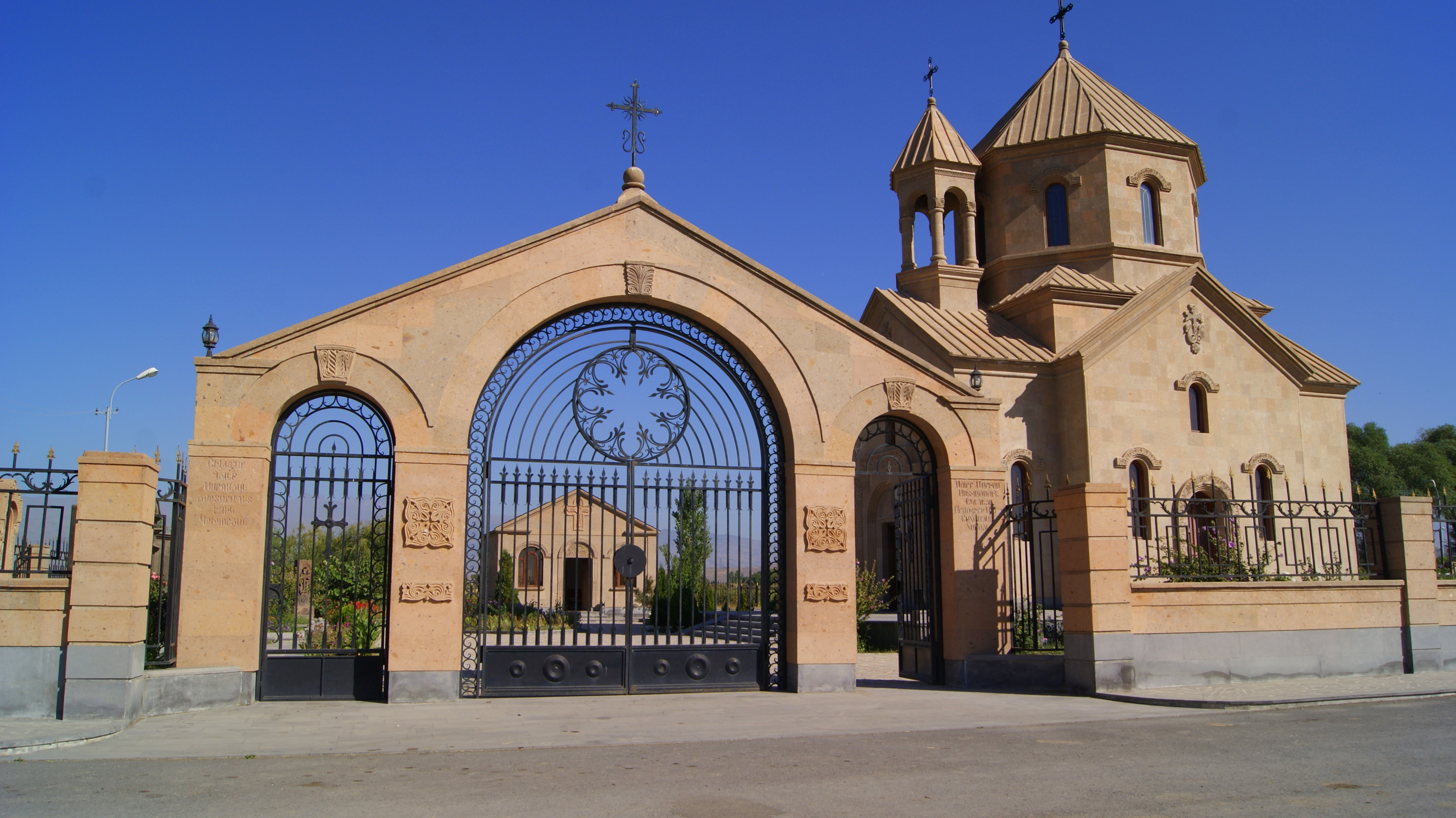
- The church of Shahumyan opened in 2010

- Location within Armenia
- Coordinates: 40°12′48″N 44°17′48″E
- Country: Armenia
- Marz (Province): Armavir

Population (2011)
  - Total: 1,642
- Time zone: UTC+4 ( )
  - Summer (DST): UTC+5 ( )

Shahumyan (Armenian: Շահումյան) formerly known as Molla Dursun, is a village in the Armavir Province of Armenia. It was renamed after Stepan Shahumyan, an Armenian Bolshevik commissar.

== See also ==
- Armavir Province
- Armavir, Armenia
