= Selo imeni Shaumyana =

Selo imeni Shaumyana Село имени Шаумяна
- Selo
- Location within Republic of Dagestan Location within Russia
- Coordinates: 43°52′N 46°41′E
- Country: Russia
- Region: Republic of Dagestan
- District: Kizlyarsky District
- Time zone: UTC+3:00

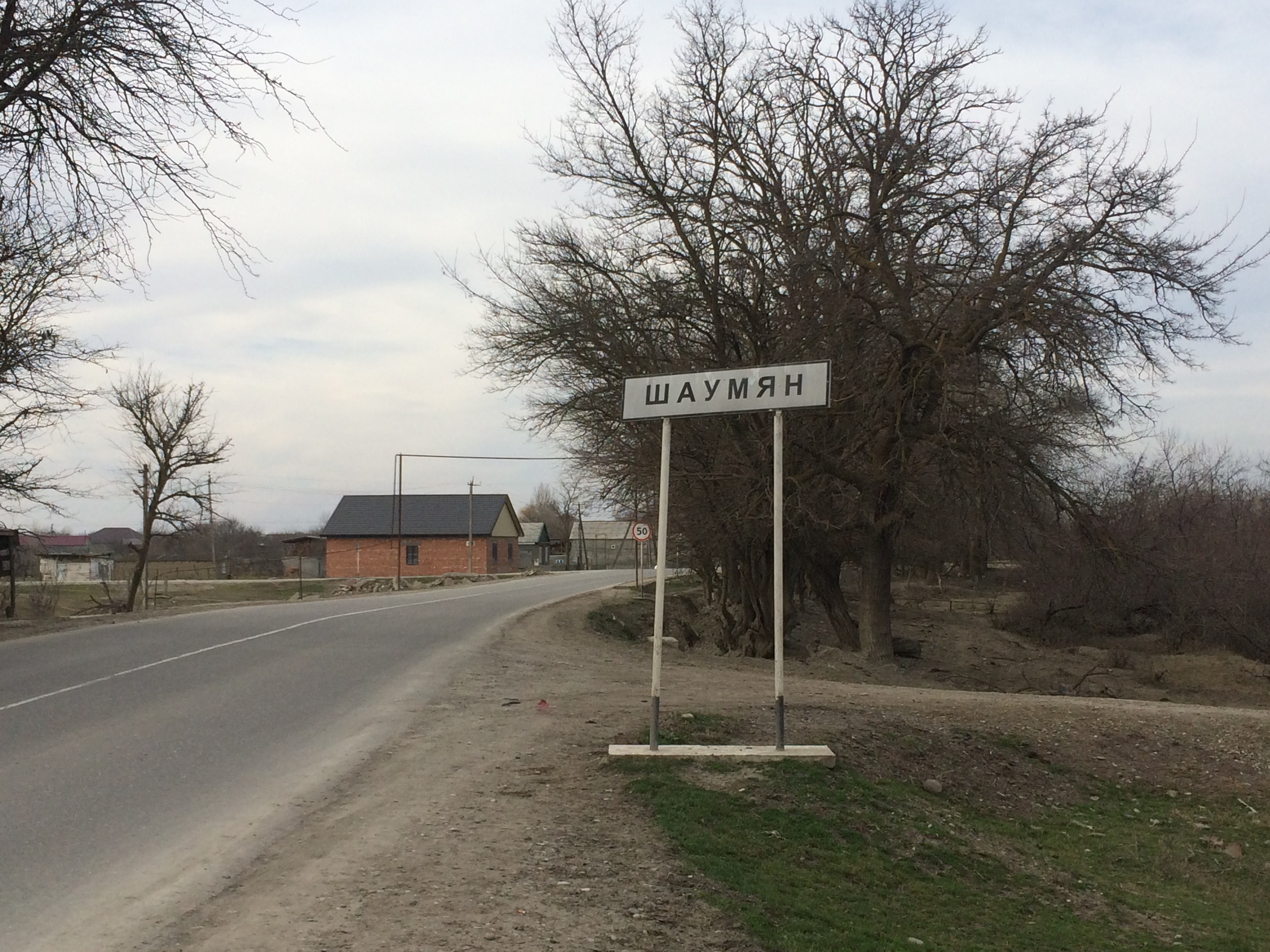
At the entrance to the village from the side of the city of Kizlyar

Selo imeni Shaumyana (Russian: Село имени Шаумяна) is a rural locality (a selo) in Krasnoarmeysky Selsoviet, Kizlyarsky District, Republic of Dagestan, Russia. The population was 1,204 as of 2010. There are 11 streets.

== Geography ==
It is located 4 km northwest of Kizlyar (the district's administrative centre) by road. Imeni Kirova and Krasny Voskhod are the nearest rural localities.

== Nationalities ==
Avars, Laks, Rutuls and Russians live there.
