= Shaumyan, Russia =

Shaumyan (Russian: Шаумян) is the name of several rural localities in Russia.

== Modern localities ==
- Shaumyan, Republic of Adygea, a khutor in Maykopsky District of the Republic of Adygea; 44°30′N 40°09′E
- Shaumyan, Republic of Crimea, a selo in Saksky District of the Republic of Crimea
- Shaumyan, Krasnodar Krai, a selo in Shaumyansky Rural Okrug of Tuapsinsky District in Krasnodar Krai; 44°19′N 39°18′E

== Alternative names ==
- Shaumyan, alternative name of Shaumyanovsky, a khutor in Shaumyanovskoye Rural Settlement of Yegorlyksky District in Rostov Oblast; 46°23′N 40°34′E
