= Rehabilitation (Soviet) =

Post-1953 Soviet exoneration of victims of repression

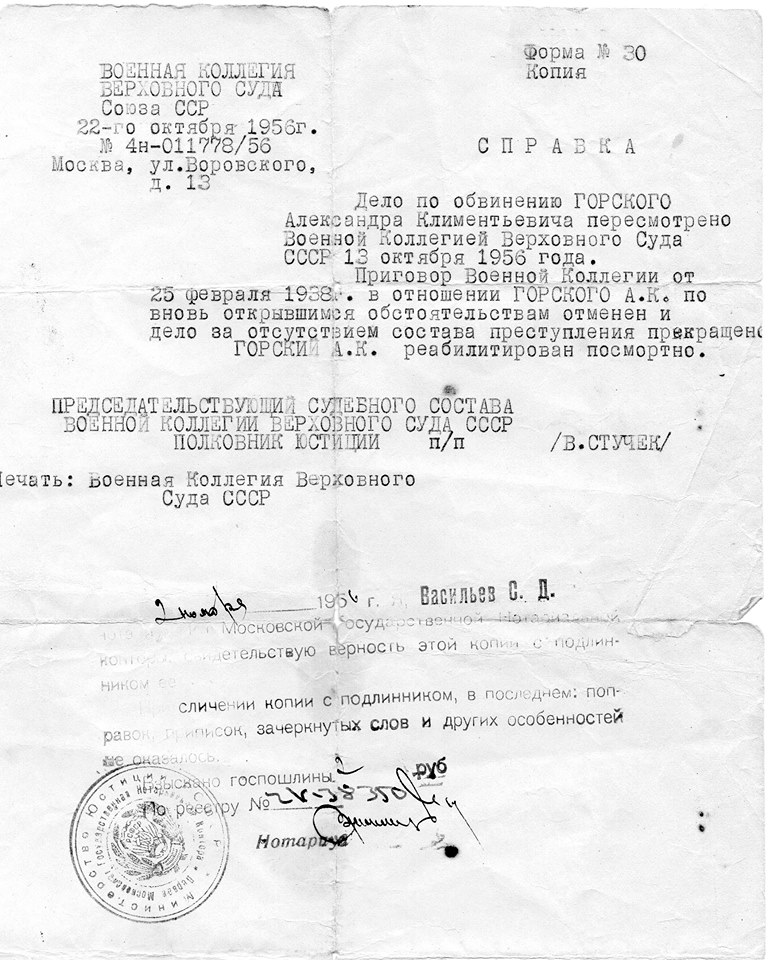
A rehabilitation certificate declaring: "...and the case was closed for lack of corpus delicti... rehabilitated posthumously"

Rehabilitation (Russian: реабилитация, transliterated in English as reabilitatsiya or academically rendered as reabilitacija) was a term used in the context of the former Soviet Union and the post-Soviet states. Beginning after the death of Joseph Stalin in 1953, the Soviet government undertook the political and social restoration, or political rehabilitation, of persons who had been repressed and criminally prosecuted without due basis. It restored the person to the state of acquittal. In many cases, rehabilitation was posthumous, as thousands of victims had been executed or died in labor camps.

The government also rehabilitated several national groups that were relocated under Stalin, and allowed them to return to their former territories and in most cases restored their autonomous regions.

== Khrushchev Thaw ==
The government started mass amnesty of the victims of Soviet repressions after the death of Joseph Stalin. The amnesty of 1953 was applied for those who had been sentenced for a term of at most five years and had been prosecuted for non-political articles in the Soviet Criminal Code (for example, children of those repressed on political grounds were often prosecuted as "antisocial elements", i.e., on the same grounds as prostitutes). This move effectively excluded any form of exoneration for political prisoners.

Following the arrest and execution of Lavrentiy Beria, the government of Nikita Khrushchev began to release many political prisoners from Gulag labor camps. In February 1954, Khrushchev ordered assessments on the state of political prisoners, making the first steps toward mass rehabilitation. On 11 March, his close ally, Anastas Mikoyan, publicly called for the rehabilitation of the poet Yeghishe Charents, a victim of the Great Purge, in a speech in Yerevan in his native Armenia. Behind the scenes, Mikoyan began assisting Armenian leaders in the rehabilitation of former "enemies" in the republic one week later.

On rehabilitations, both Mikoyan and Khrushchev were advised by former Gulag prisoners Alexei Snegov and Olga Shatunovskaya. Snegov strongly encouraged Khrushchev to condemn Stalin and his cult of personality at the forthcoming 20th Congress of the Communist Party of the Soviet Union. At the "closed session" of the Congress on 25 February 1956, Khrushchev strongly denounced Stalin and his crimes in his speech "On the Cult of Personality and Its Consequences". The speech signaled the start of de-Stalinization and accelerated the rehabilitation of political prisoners, allowing them to return home and reclaim their lives.

Under Stalin, several nationalities had been deported to Siberia, Kazakhstan, and Central Asia during World War II. These groups were also rehabilitated during the Khrushchev Thaw. The Soviet government restored their former autonomous regions and allowed most of these nationalities to return to their former homelands. However, it did not restore territory to the Volga Germans and Crimean Tatars. The Crimean Tatars were rehabilitated in accordance with Ukaz 493 in 1967, and allowed to return to Crimea in 1990.

In most cases, the persons were released with the phrases "due to the lack of a criminal matter", "for lack of corpus delicti", "based on previously unavailable information", "due to the lack of a proof of guilt", etc. Many rehabilitations occurred posthumously, as thousands had been executed by Stalin's government or died in the harsh conditions of the labor camps.

== Perestroika and post-Soviet states ==
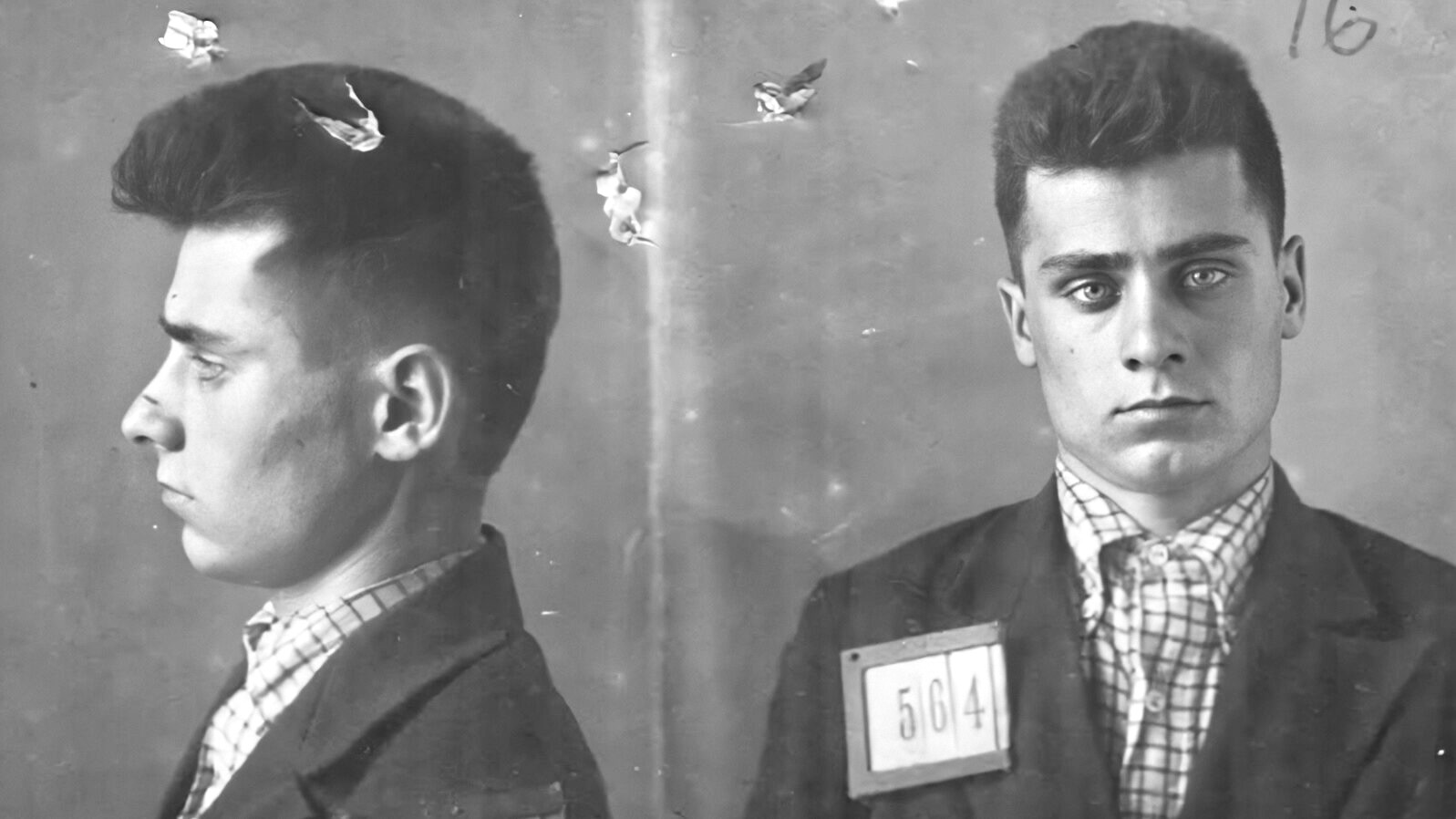
Georgian student activist Dimitri Vardanashvili, whose rehabilitation was refused in 1989

Another wave of rehabilitations began in the late 1980s, as part of Mikhail Gorbachev's reforms of glasnost and perestroika. Between 1987 and 1989, close to 840,000 persons were rehabilitated, with one of the most prominent cases being that of Nikolai Bukharin, who was rehabilitated in 1988. This followed an earlier, unsuccessful effort to rehabilitate Bukharin under Khrushchev, in 1962.

After the dissolution of the Soviet Union in 1991, the trend of rehabilitations continued in most post-Soviet states. The modern Russian Federation and Ukraine have enacted laws "On the Rehabilitation of the Victims of Political Repressions", which provide the basis for the continued post-Stalinist rehabilitation of victims. Leon Trotsky (murdered in 1940) was rehabilitated in post-Soviet Russia on 16 June 2001.

== See also ==
- On the Rehabilitation of Repressed Peoples
- Death dates of victims of the Great Purge

== Bibliography ==
- Adler, Nanci (2004). The Gulag Survivor: Beyond the Soviet System. New Brunswick, NJ: Transaction Publishers. ISBN 9781412837125.
- Cohen, Stephen F. (2011). The Victims Return: Survivors of the Gulag After Stalin. London: I.B. Tauris. ISBN 9781848858480.
- Polian, Pavel Markovich (2004). Against Their Will: The History and Geography of Forced Migrations in the USSR. Translated by Anna Yastrzhembska. Budapest: Central European University Press. ISBN 9789639241688.
- Shakarian, Pietro A. (2025). Anastas Mikoyan: An Armenian Reformer in Khrushchev's Kremlin. Bloomington: Indiana University Press. ISBN 978-0253073556.
- Smith, Kathleen E. (2017). Moscow 1956: The Silenced Spring. Cambridge, MA: Harvard University Press. ISBN 9780674972001.
