= Khan Kandi, Ahar =

Khan Kandi خان كندي
- Village
- Location within Iran
- Coordinates: 38°58′51″N 47°17′42″E
- Country: Iran
- Province: East Azerbaijan
- County: Ahar
- Bakhsh: Hurand
- Rural District: Chahardangeh

Population (2006)
  - Total: 243
- Time zone: UTC+3:30 (IRST)
  - Summer (DST): UTC+4:30 (IRDT)

Khan Kandi (Persian: خان كندي, also Romanized as Khān Kandī) is a village in Chahardangeh Rural District, Hurand District, Ahar County, East Azerbaijan Province, Iran. At the 2006 census, its population was 243, in 45 families.
