= Tatyana Shaumyan =

Russian scholar

- Born: January 11, 1938 (age 87)
- Citizenship: Russia
- Awards: Padma Shri (2022)

Tatyana Lvovna Shaumyan (Russian: Татьяна Львовна Шаумян; born 11 January 1938) is a Soviet and Russian orientalist. She is the head of the Center for Indian Studies at the Institute of Oriental Studies of the Russian Academy of Sciences. Her research interests include international relations in South and Central Asia and Far East in 20-21st century and India's foreign policy. She was awarded Padma Shri, the fourth-highest civilian award of India, by the Government of India in 2022, for fostering India–Russia relations.

== Early life ==
Tatyana was born into the family of soviet scientist and journalist Lev Stepanovich Shaumyan. Her grandfather, Stepan Shaumyan, was one of the 26 Baku commissars.

== Career ==
Tatyana graduated from the Department of History from Moscow State University. In the same year, she entered the Institute of Asian Peoples of the USSR Academy of Sciences (now the Institute of Oriental Studies of the Russian Academy of Sciences). In 1966, she defended her PhD thesis in history titled Russia and Tibet at the beginning of 20th century. Since 2001, she is the head of the Center for Indian Studies at the Institute of Oriental Studies of the Russian Academy of Sciences, where she also serves as the head of the Contemporary Problems Sector.

She is a member of the editorial staff of the magazine "Asia and Africa Today".

=== Memberships ===
- Deputy Head, Indo-Russian Joint Commission on Cooperation in Social Sciences
- Member, the Scientific Council under the Security Council of Russian Federation (RF)
- Member, Advisory Council on International Affairs of the Federation Council of the Federal Assembly of the RF
- Member, National Committee on BRICS Studies

== Selected publications ==
- Russia, Great Britain and Tibet in the Great Game. By Tatyana Shaumyan. Moscow, 2017. 205 p. (In Russian).
- Tibet: The Great Game and Tsarist Russia. By Tatyana Shaumyan. New Delhi: Oxford University Press, 2000. 223 p. (In English).
- The Image of Russia in India: Past and Present. By Tatyana Shaumyan, et al. Moscow, 2011. (In Russian).
- "Human Rights in the Context of Inter-civilizational Contacts." By Tatyana Shaumyan. In Peoples of Eurasia: The Problem of Inter-civilizational Contacts, 142–176. Moscow, 2005. (In Russian).
- Russia and Tibet: Russian Archive Documents, 1900-1914. Edited by Tatyana Shaumyan. Moscow, 2005. (Introduction by T. Shaumyan). (In Russian).
- "Indo-Pak Armed Conflict in Kargil: Causes and Consequences." By Tatyana Shaumyan. Himalayan and Central Asian Studies (New Delhi) 4, no. 2 (April-June 2000). (In English).
- "The Russian ‘Threat’ to British India: Tibetan Angle." By Tatyana Shaumyan. In Indian History: A Russian Viewpoint, edited by Ye. Vanina. Delhi: Pragati, 2003. (In English).
- "The Himalayan Frontiers of China." By Tatyana Shaumyan. In Frontiers of China: History of Formation. Moscow, 2001. (In Russian).
- "Regional Problems of Non-proliferation: South Asia." By Tatyana Shaumyan, et al. In Nuclear Weapons after the Cold War. Moscow: Carnegie Moscow Center / R. Elnin Publishing House, 2008. (In Russian).
- "The Changing Geopolitical Situation in Central Asia and China, Russia and India." By Tatyana Shaumyan. In Russia, India and China Interaction in XXI century: Problems, Perspectives and Directions, Vol. 2, 46–55. Moscow, 2004. (In Russian).
- "Environmental Problems: Possibilities for Trilateral Cooperation." By Tatyana Shaumyan. China Report (New Delhi) 43, no. 2 (April-June 2007): 195–201. (In English).
- "Security Issues: SCO and India." By Tatyana Shaumyan. In SCO: New Dimensions, 302–328. Moscow: Institute of Far Eastern Studies, 2008. (In Russian).
- "USSR/Russia Political Support of India in International Arena during the Cold War." By Tatyana Shaumyan. In To India of Spirituality…Felicitating Volume on the 70th Birthday of Prof. R. Rybakov, 440–453. Moscow, 2008. (In Russian).
- "The Tibet Question in 1907: Anglo-Russian Convention." By Tatyana Shaumyan. In Euroasian Vision: Felicitating Volume on the 70th Birthday of Prof. Devendra Kaushik, edited by Mahavir Singh and Victor Krassilchtchikov, 295–306. New Delhi: Anamika Publishers, 2003. (In English).
- "Tibet in Soviet Studies." By Tatyana Shaumyan. In Eurasia Twenty Years After, 62–77. Kolkata: Maulana Abdul Kalam Institute of Asian Studies / Delhi: Shipra Publications, 2012. (In English).
- "Jammu and Kashmir Problem." By Tatyana Shaumyan. In Ethnicity and Religion in Modern Conflicts, edited by V.A. Tishkov and V.A. Shnirelman, 522–572. Moscow: Nauka, 2012. (In Russian).
- Political Systems of South Asian Countries. By Tatyana Shaumyan. Moscow: URSS, 2014. 176 p. (In Russian).
- "Russia Seeks to Revive the Primakov Triangle with India and China." By Tatyana Shaumyan. Global Dialogue Review (New Delhi) 3, no. 4 (October-December 2015): 12–20. (In English).
- "India in Regional and Global Context." By Tatyana Shaumyan. In Proceedings of the VIII Convent of the Russian International Studies Association (RISA-2015), 148–159. Moscow: MGIMO-University, 2015. ISBN 978-5-9228-1368-6. (In Russian).
