= Məmişlər, Shusha =

Village in Shusha, Azerbaijan

Məmişlər
- Location within Azerbaijan Location within Karabakh Economic Region
- Coordinates: 39°46′06″N 46°37′44″E
- Country: Azerbaijan
- District: Shusha
- Time zone: UTC+4 (AZT)

Məmişlər (Mamishlar) is a village in the Shusha District of Azerbaijan.
