= Pospelov Commission =

The Pospelov Commission was a commission of the Central Committee of the Communist Party of the Soviet Union Presidium. It was headed by Pyotr Pospelov, whose findings had laid the basis and the contents of Nikita Khrushchev's "secret speech" On the Personality Cult and its Consequences. According to Khrushchev's speech, "the commission was instructed to inquire into how it was possible to carry out massive repressions against the members and candidate members of the Party elected at the 17th Congress of the All-Union Communist Party".

The commission was set by the Presidium on December 31, 1955. In addition to its chairman Pospelov, it included Central Committee secretary Averky Aristov, All-Union Central Council of Trade Unions chairman Nikolai Shvernik and deputy chairman of the Party Control Committee P.T. Komarov. The report of the commission was presented to the Presidium on February 9, 1956. The report caused heated controversy and split of opinions as to further actions.
