= Xankəndi, Shamakhi =

Khankendi
- Azerbaijani: Xankəndi
- Location within Azerbaijan
- Coordinates: 40°35′N 48°31′E
- Country: Azerbaijan
- District: Shamakhi
- Time zone: UTC+4 (AZT)
  - Summer (DST): UTC+5 (AZT)

Xankəndi (also Khankendi and formerly Şaumyanabad) is a village in the Shamakhi District of Azerbaijan.
