= Shahumyan, Lori =

Shahumyan Շահումյան
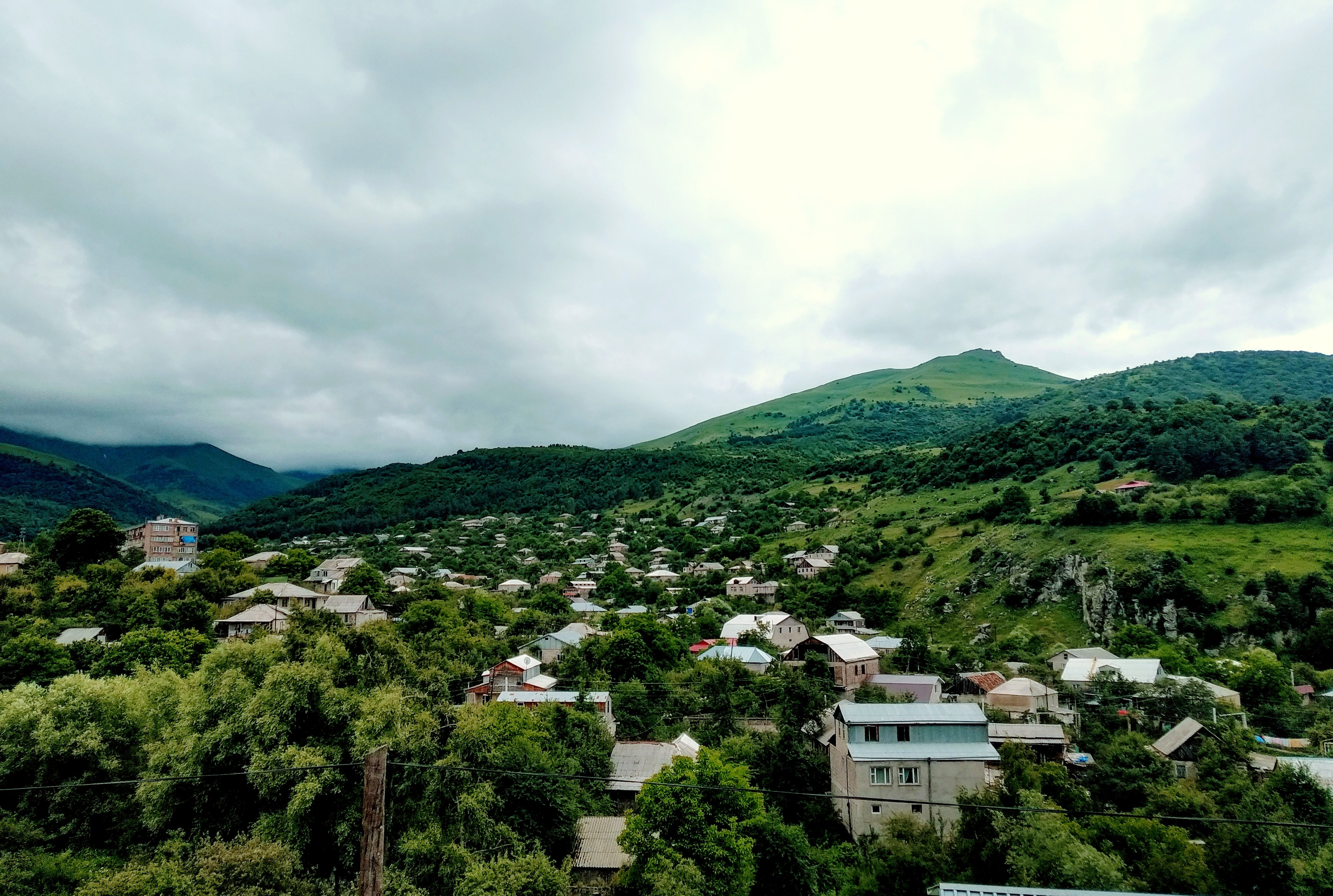

- Location within Armenia
- Coordinates: 40°47′18″N 44°31′54″E
- Country: Armenia
- Marz (Province): Lori
- Elevation: 1,500 m (4,900 ft)

Population (2011)
  - Total: 1,934
- Time zone: UTC+4
  - Summer (DST): UTC+5

Shahumyan (Armenian: Շահումյան) is a town in the Lori Province of Armenia.

== Etymology ==
It was named Shahumyan after the Bolshevik-Armenian commander Stepan Shahumyan following Armenia's independence.

== Gallery ==
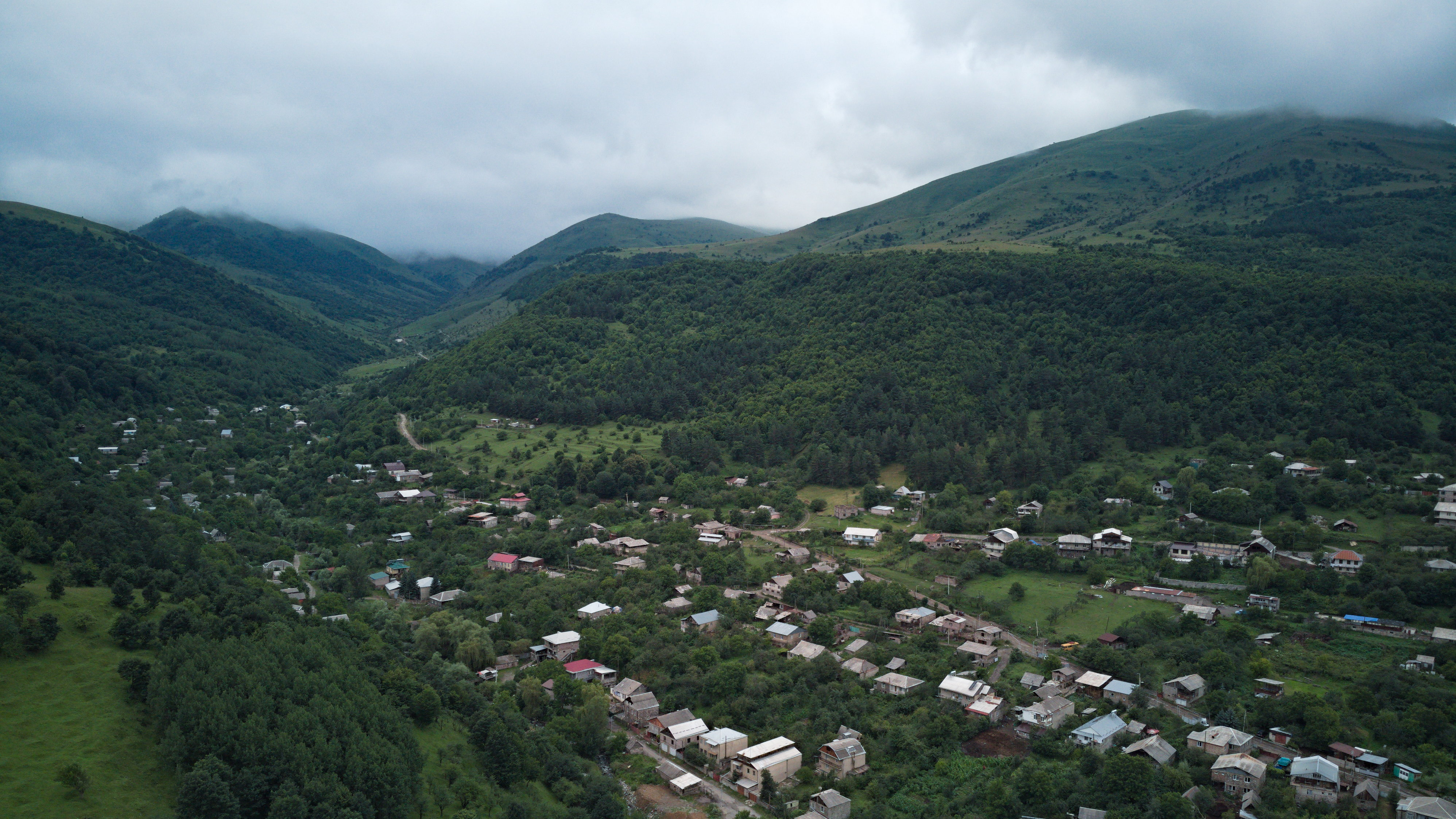
Shahumyan aerial view
