= Stepan Shaumian =

Armenian Bolshevik revolutionary (1878–1918)

- Ստեփան Շահումյան
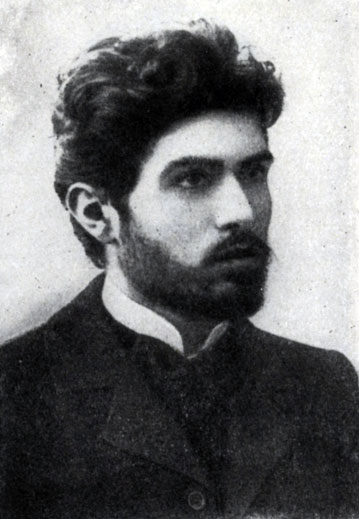

Commissar Extraordinary for the Caucasus
- In office 25 April 1918 – 31 July 1918
- Preceded by: Position established
- Succeeded by: Position abolished

Personal details
- Born: 13 October 1878 Tiflis, Russian Empire (now Tbilisi, Georgia)
- Died: 20 September 1918 (aged 39) Krasnovodsk, Russian SFSR (now Türkmenbaşy, Turkmenistan)
- Party: RSDLP (1900–1912); Russian Communist Party (Bolsheviks) (1912–1918)
- Children: Suren; Lev; Sergey
- Education: Humboldt University of Berlin
- Occupation: Politician, revolutionary
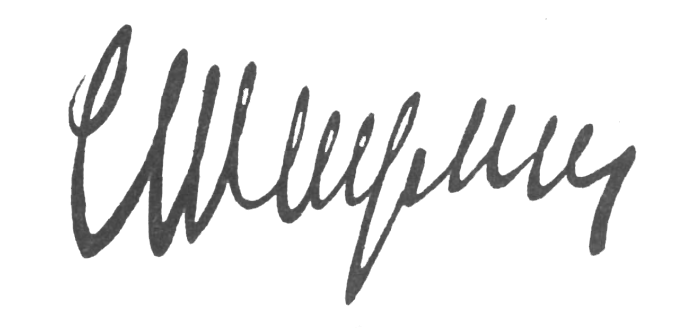
- Signature

Stepan Georgevich Shahumian (Russian: Степан Георгиевич Шаумян; Armenian: Ստեփան Գեւորգի Շահումյան, romanized: Stepan Gevorgi Shahumyan; 1 October 1878 – 20 September 1918) was an Armenian Bolshevik revolutionary and politician active throughout the Caucasus. His role as a leader of the Russian Revolution in the Caucasus earned him the nickname of the "Caucasian Lenin", a reference to Russian revolutionary leader Vladimir Lenin.

The founder and editor of several newspapers and journals, Shaumian is best known for his leadership of the Baku Commune, a short-lived committee appointed by Lenin in March 1918 with the task of leading the revolution in the Caucasus and West Asia. His tenure as leader of the Baku Commune was marred with numerous problems including ethnic violence between Baku's Armenian and Azerbaijani populations, attempting to defend the city against an advancing Turkish army, all the while attempting to spread the cause of the revolution throughout the region. Unlike many other Bolsheviks at the time, he preferred to resolve many of the conflicts he faced peacefully rather than with force and terror.

Shaumian was known by various aliases, including "Suren", "Surenin" and "Ayaks". After the Baku Commune was voted out of power in July 1918, he fled across the Caspian Sea with the other leaders of the Commune, known as the 26 Baku Commissars. He and the rest of the commissars were captured and executed by anti-Bolshevik forces on 20 September 1918.

== Early life ==
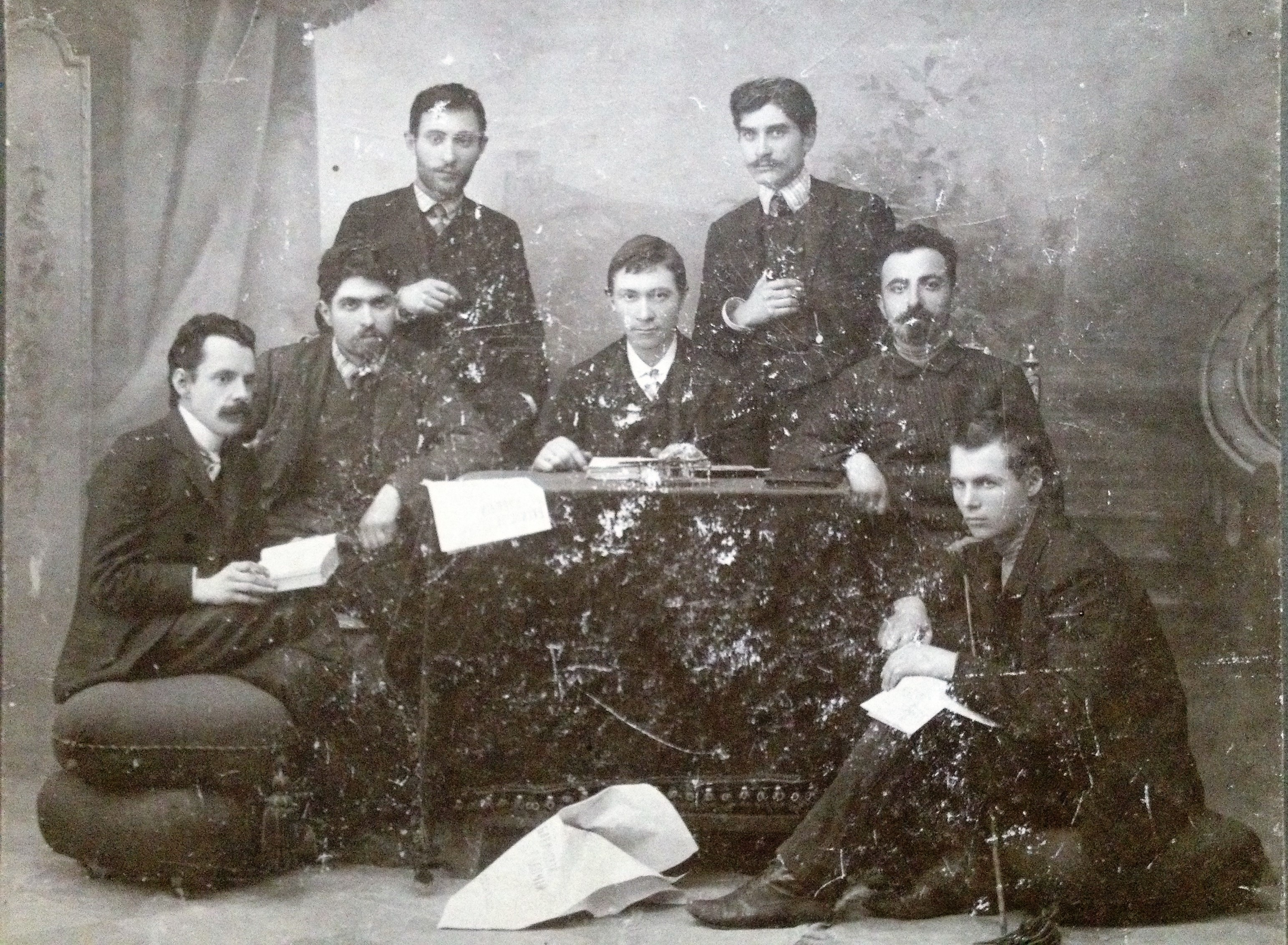
Shaumian and Dzhaparidze in 1908 (Shaumian second from left, Dzhaparidze first from right)

Stepan Gevorgi Shaumian was born to a family of Armenian cloth merchants in Tiflis (Tbilisi), then part of the Russian Empire. His family was descended from the Shaumian line of meliks (Armenian nobility) of Meghri; one of his ancestors, also named Stepan Shahumian, took part in Davit Bek's rebellion in the 1720s. He became involved in revolutionary politics as a student in Tiflis. He graduated in 1898 and entered the Riga Polytechnic Institute, but left when his family ran into financial difficulties, and found work as a proofreader. In 1899, he formed Armenia's first Marxist group in the village of Jalaloghli (today the town of Stepanavan). In 1900, he returned to Riga to resume his education at the Polytechnic Institute and joined the Russian Social Democratic Party (RSDLP). In March 1902, he was expelled from the institute, arrested, and exiled back to Transcaucasia. That same year, he co-founded the Union of Armenian Social Democrats in Tiflis.

== Revolutionary beginnings ==
In November 1902, Shaumian enrolled in the philosophy department of Humboldt University of Berlin, from which he graduated in 1905. In Europe, he met with such exiles from the Russian Empire as Lenin, Julius Martov and Georgi Plekhanov, and was present at the 2nd Congress of the RSDLP, in London, at which the party split into factions, and Shaumian sided with the Bolsheviks.

Shaumian returned to Tiflis in 1904, obtained a job as a teacher, while working illicitly as a Bolshevik organiser, leader of local Social Democrats in Tiflis, as well as a prolific writer of Marxist literature. By 1907 he had moved to Baku to head up the significant Bolshevik movement in the city. Joseph Stalin, then known as 'Koba' was also based in Baku. They clashed. Shaumian was arrested on 30 April 1909, but was released after his employer interceded on his behalf, and accused 'Koba' of being a police agent, as the only person who had known the address of the safe house where he had been hiding. This accusation against Stalin was never proved, and Shaumian apparently accepted his denials, because they continued to collaborate.

In 1914, Shaumian led the general strike in Baku. The strike was crushed by Imperial Army and Shaumian was arrested and sent to prison. He was released after the February Revolution of 1917. In October 1917, Shaumian headed the all-Caucasus Congress of the Bolshevik Party in Tiflis, where he "proposed granting broad home rule to the peoples of Transcaucasia by dividing the area into three autonomous units, approximately corresponding to the future Soviet republics of Georgia, Armenia, and Azerbaijan."

== The Baku Commune ==
=== Early problems ===
Shaumian in Baku, 1917

Following the October Revolution (which was centred in Petrograd and Moscow, and thus had little effect on Baku), Shaumian was made Commissar Extraordinary for the Caucasus and Chairman of the Baku Council of People's Commissars. The government of the Baku Commune consisted of an alliance of Bolsheviks, Left Socialist-Revolutionaries, Mensheviks and Dashnaks.

In March 1918 the leaders of Baku Commune disarmed a group of Azerbaijani soldiers, who had come to Baku from Lenkoran on the ship Evelina to attend the funeral of Mamed Taghiyev, son of the millionaire Zeynalabdin Taghiyev. In response, a huge crowd gathered in the yard of one of the Baku mosques and adopted a resolution demanding the release of the rifles confiscated by the Soviet from the crew of the Evelina. The Azerbaijani Bolshevik organization Hümmet attempted to mediate the dispute by proposing that the weapons were taken from the Savage Division to be transferred to the custody of Hümmet. Shaumian agreed to this proposal. But on the afternoon of 31 March, when Muslim representatives appeared before the Baku Soviet leadership to take the weapons, shots were already heard in the city and the Soviet commissar Prokofy Dzhaparidze refused to provide arms and informed the Hümmet leadership that "Musavat had launched a political war". While it was not established who fired the first shot, the Baku Commune leaders accused the Muslims of starting the hostilities, and with the support of Dashnak forces attacked the Muslim quarters:

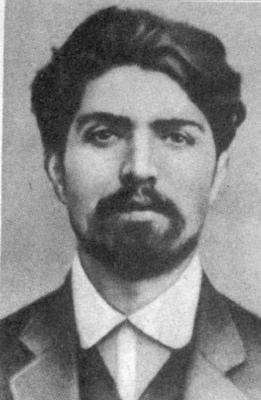
Arrested Shaumian

We needed to give a rebuff, and we exploited the opportunity of the first attempt at an armed assault on our cavalry unit and began an attack on the whole front. Due to the efforts of both the local Soviet and the Military-revolutionary committee of the Caucasus Army, which moved here (from Tiflis and Sarikamish) we already had armed forces – about 6,000 strong. Dashnaktsutiun also had 3,000–4,000 of national forces, which were at our disposal. The participation of the latter lent the civil war, to some extent, the character of an ethnic massacre, however, it was impossible to avoid this. We were going for it deliberately. The Muslim poor suffered severely, however they are now rallying around the Bolsheviks and the Soviet.

On the morning of 1 April 1918, the Committee of Revolutionary Defense of the Baku Soviet issued a leaflet with the message:

In view of the fact that the counterrevolutionary Musavat party declared war on the Soviet of Workers', Soldiers', and Sailors' Deputies in the city of Baku and thus threatened the existence of the government of the revolutionary democracy, Baku is declared to be in a state of siege.

Bolsheviks had only about 6,000 loyal troops, and they were forced to seek support from either Muslim Musavat or Armenian Dashnaktsutyun. Shaumian, himself an Armenian, chose the latter. Firuz Kazemzadeh asserted that the Baku Soviet provoked the March events to eliminate its most formidable rival: the Musavat. However, when Soviet leaders reached out to the ARF for assistance against the Azerbaijani nationalists, the conflict degenerated into a massacre with the Armenians killing the Muslims irrespective of their political affiliations or social and economic position. Estimates of the number of Azerbaijanis and other Muslims massacred in Baku and surrounding regions range between 3,000 and 12,000.

The Committee of Revolutionary Defense issued another proclamation early in April 1918, which insisted on an anti-Soviet character of the rebellion and blamed Musavat and its leadership for the events. The Soviet's statement asserted that there was a carefully laid out plot by Musavat to overthrow the Baku Soviet and to establish its own regime:

The enemies of Soviet power in the city of Baku have raised their head. The malice and hatred with which they viewed the revolutionary organ of the workers and soldiers began recently to overflow into open counterrevolutionary activities. The appearance of the staff of the Savage Division, headed by the unmasked Talyshkhanov, the events in Lenkoran, in Mugan, and at Shemakha, the capture of Petrovsk by the Daghestan regiment and the withholding of grain shipments from Baku, the threats of Elisavetpol, and in the last few days of Tiflis, to march on Baku, against soviet power, the aggressive movements of the armored train of the Transcaucasian Commissariat in Adzhikabul, and, finally, the outrageous behavior of the Savage Division on the steamship Evelina in shooting comrades—all this speaks of the criminal plans of the counterrevolutionaries grouped mainly around the Bek party Musavat and having as its goal the overthrow of Soviet power, so hated by the bourgeoisie and landlords."

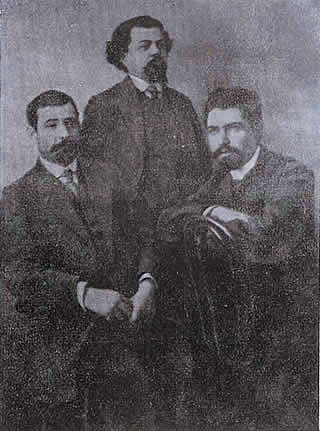
Shaumian on the right

Less than six months later, in September 1918, Nuri Pasha's Ottoman-led Army of Islam, supported by Azerbaijani forces, recaptured Baku and subsequently killed an estimated 10,000 to 20,000 ethnic Armenians.

The Bolsheviks clashed with Dashnaks and Mensheviks over the involvement of British forces, which the latter two welcomed. In either case, Shaumian was under direct orders from Moscow to refuse aid offered by the British. However, he understood the consequences of not accepting British aid, including a further massacre of Armenians by the Turks. Major Ranald MacDonell, a seasoned diplomat and the British vice-consul of Baku, was tasked by his superiors to persuade Shaumian to reconsider British support.

=== Coup plots ===
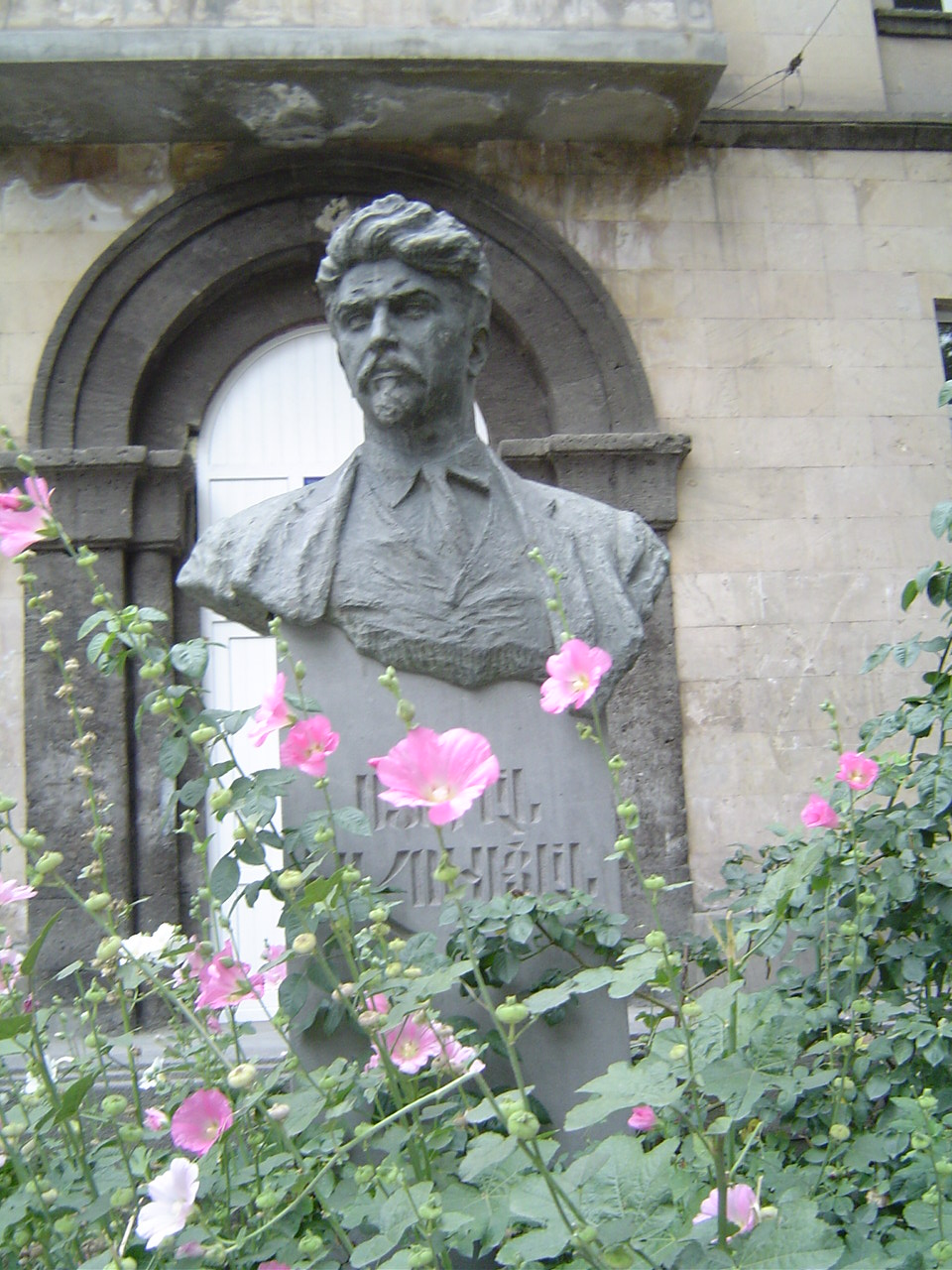
The bust of Shaumian in front of Stepan Shahumyan School #1 in Yerevan, Armenia

In mid-summer, MacDonell personally visited Shaumian's home in Baku and the two discussed the issue of British military involvement in a generally amiable conversation. Shaumian first raised the spectre of what British involvement would entail: "Is your General Dunsterville [the head of the military force awaiting orders to enter Baku] coming to Baku to turn us out?" MacDonell reassured him that Dunsterville, being a member of the military, was not claiming any political stake in the conflict but was merely interested in helping him defend the city. Unconvinced, Shaumian replied, "And you really believe that a British general and a Bolshevik commissar would make good partners....No! We will organise our own force to fight the Turk."

Shaumian was under the impression that the Bolsheviks would soon be sending reinforcements from the Caspian Sea to assist him, although that prospect remained highly unlikely. He had sent numerous telegrams to Moscow extolling the fighting abilities of his Armenian units but warned that they too, would soon be unable to halt the advance of Enver's army. With this, MacDonell's and Shaumian's conversation ended with the possibility of accepting British aid in exchange for complete Bolshevik control over the military force, terms the British could not immediately accept.

Relations between the Baku Commune and the British soon reached a turning point when Britain decided to reverse its support for Bolsheviks. Shaumian's intransigence had cost him their support, MacDonell was told by a British officer: "the new policy of the British and French governments was to support the anti-Bolshevik forces....It mattered little whether they were Tsarist or Social Revolutionary."

Over the previous days, numerous people had visited MacDonell, pleading for a withdrawal of British support for Shaumian. Many claimed to be former Tsarist officers offering their service to rise against the Bolsheviks, though MacDonell reportedly suspected them to have been agents working on behalf of the Bolsheviks.

=== Expulsion ===
On 26 July 1918, the Bolsheviks were outvoted 259–236 in the Baku Soviet. Shaumian's support had eroded and many of his key supporters abandoned him. Angered with the outcome of the vote, he announced that his party would withdraw from the Soviet and Baku itself: "With pain in our hearts and curses on our lips, we who had come here to die for the Soviet regime are forced to leave."

A new government headed primarily by Russians, known as Central Caspian Dictatorship (Diktatura Tsentrokaspiya) was formed, as British forces under General Lionel Dunsterville arrived in Baku.

== Arrest and death ==
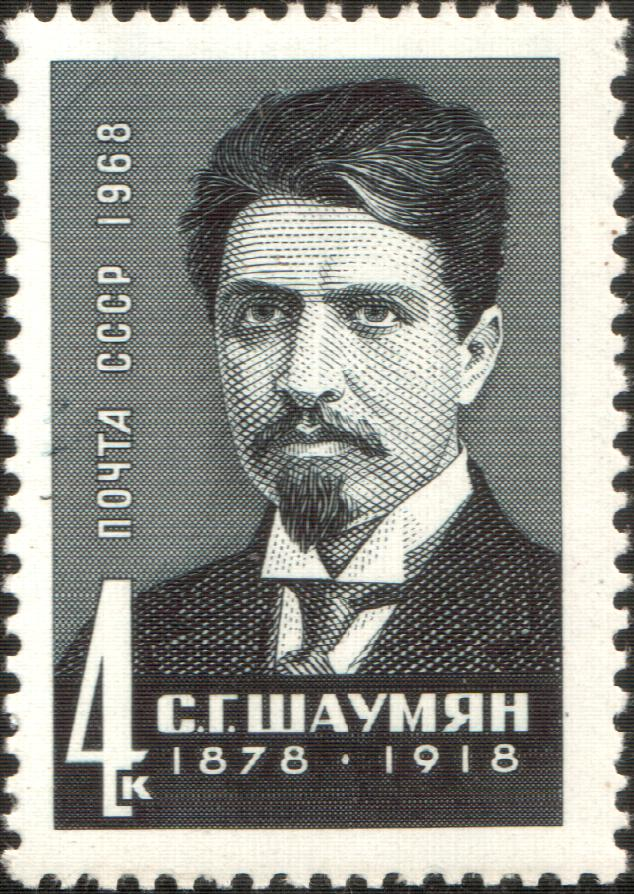
A 1968 USSR postage stamp honoring Shaumian

On 31 July 1918, the 26 Baku Commissars attempted the evacuation of Bolshevik armed troops by sailing over the Caspian Sea to Astrakhan, but the ships were captured on 16 August by the military vessels of the Central Caspian Dictatorship. The Commissars were arrested and placed in Baku prison. On 28 August, Shaumian and his comrades were elected in absentia to the Baku Soviet. On 14 September, amidst the confusion as Baku fell to Turkish forces, Shaumian and his fellow commissars either escaped or were released. In the most widely accepted version of events a group of Bolsheviks headed by Anastas Mikoyan broke into the prison and released Shaumian. He and the other commissars then boarded a ship to Krasnovodsk, where upon arrival he was promptly arrested by anti-Bolshevik elements led by their commandant, Kuhn. Kuhn then requested further orders from the "Ashkhabad Committee", led by the Socialist Revolutionary Fyodor Funtikov, about what should be done with them.

Three days later, the British Major-General Wilfrid Malleson, on hearing of their arrest, contacted Britain's liaison-officer in Ashgabat, Captain Reginald Teague-Jones, to suggest that the commissars be handed over to British forces in Meshed to be used as hostages in exchange for British citizens held by the Soviets. That same day, Teague-Jones attended the committee's meeting in Ashgabat, which had the task of deciding the fate of the Commissars. For some reason Teague-Jones did not communicate Malleson's request to the committee, and later claimed he left before a decision was made and did not discover until the following day that the committee had eventually decided to issue orders that the commissars should be executed. On the night of 20 September, Shaumian and the others were executed in a remote location in the Turkmen desert.

In 1956, the Observer published a letter written by a British staff officer who recounted a conversation he had had with Malleson, stricken with malaria at the time, on what was to be done to the commissars. Malleson replied that since the matter did not involve the British, they should not concern themselves with the issue. The telegram that was sent told the authorities holding the commissars to dispose of them "as they sought fit." Nevertheless, Malleson expressed his horror when he learned upon the ultimate fate that had befallen the commissars.

== Legacy and reburial ==
First funeral of the 26 Baku Commissars (the crying woman is the mother of Mir Hasan Vezirov).

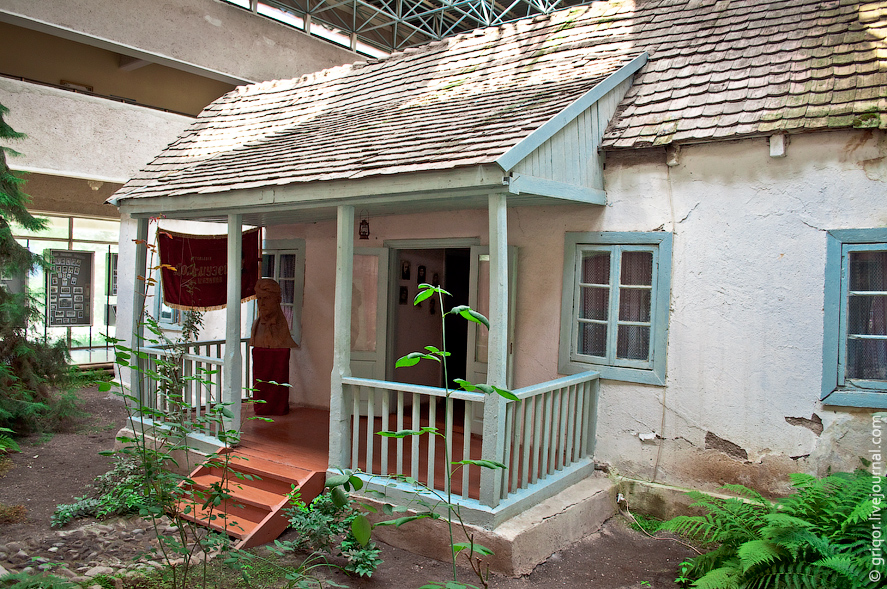
House Museum of Shaumian in Stepanavan

Following Shaumian's death, the Soviet government depicted him as a fallen hero of the Russian Revolution. Shaumian's close relationship with Lenin also exacerbated the already heightened tensions between the British and the Soviets, who placed much of the blame on the British in complicity in the massacre. Anastas Mikoyan was especially active in working to preserve the memory of Shaumian, who he regarded as his "revolutionary mentor." As American journalist Harrison Salisbury wrote:

Mikoyan never tired of talking of Shaumian nor of singing his praises as a remarkable revolutionary leader. He was dedicated to Shaumian's family and children and in later years treated them as if they were his own.

During the Soviet period, Khankendi in the Nagorno-Karabakh region of Soviet Azerbaijan was renamed as Stepanakert, after Shaumian. The city of Jalaloghli in Soviet Armenia was also renamed, in Shaumian's honor, Stepanavan, a name it has retained in post-Soviet Armenia. Streets in Lipetsk, Yekaterinburg, Stavropol and Rostov-on-Don (Russia), an avenue in Saint Petersburg are named in Shaumian's honour. A statue of him erected in 1931 stands in Yerevan, the capital of Armenia. Shaumian was also regularly praised by party leaders in the Caucasus. In 1978, Soviet Azerbaijan's First Secretary Heydar Aliyev remarked:

And today we say with pride and love, that the great son of the Armenian people Stepan is also the son of the Azerbaijani people, of all peoples of Transcaucasia, of the entire multinational and united Soviet people.

Since the dissolution of the Soviet Union, Shaumian's legacy has been impacted by the Nagorno-Karabakh conflict. In January 2009, Azerbaijan's post-Soviet authorities demolished the 26 Commissars Memorial in Baku. The move caused an outcry in Armenia, as the Armenian public widely perceived the reburial to be motivated by anti-Armenian sentiment. A scandal emerged when the Azerbaijani press reported that only 21 bodies were found buried in the park, as "Shaumian and four other Armenian commissars managed to escape their murderers". The claim was denied by Shaumian's granddaughter, Tatyana, who is a historian at the Institute of Oriental Studies of the Russian Academy of Sciences in Moscow. In 2009, she told the Russian daily Kommersant:

It is impossible to believe that they weren't all buried. There is a film in the archives of 26 bodies being buried. Apart from this, my grandmother was present at the reburial.

Historian Ronald Grigor Suny has stressed the importance of Shaumian's efforts to "win power for the people democratically and nonviolently." He added that "the story of the Baku Commune he built provides an important perspective on the Russian Revolution and the subsequent civil war."

== Places named after Shaumian ==
Armenia

- Stepanavan, Lori
- Shahumyan, Ararat
- Shahumyan, Armavir
- Shahumyan, Lori
- Shahumyan, Yerevan

Azerbaijan

- Goygol, Goygol Rayon (formerly Shaumyan)
- Aşağı Ağcakənd, Goranboy (formerly Shaumyan)
- Məmişlər, Sabirabad (formerly Shaumyanovka)
- Stepanakert, Nagorno-Karabakh

Russia

- Shaumyan, Krasnodar Krai
- Shaumyan, Stavropol Krai
- Shaumyana Street, Mozdok, Ossetia

== See also ==
- Outline of the Russian Revolution and Civil War
- Bibliography of the Russian Revolution and Civil War
- Bibliography of Stalinism and the Soviet Union
- Index of Old Bolsheviks
- Index of articles related to the Russian Revolution and Civil War

== Bibliography ==
- Hopkirk, Peter (2001). On Secret Service East of Constantinople: The Plot to Bring Down the British Empire. Oxford: Oxford University Press. ISBN 0-19-280230-5.
- Shakarian, Pietro A. (2025). Anastas Mikoyan: An Armenian Reformer in Khrushchev's Kremlin. Bloomington: Indiana University Press. ISBN 978-0253073556.
- Suny, Ronald Grigor (1972). The Baku Commune, 1917-1918: Class and Nationality in the Russian Revolution. Princeton: Princeton University Press. ISBN 978-0691051932.
- Suny, Ronald Grigor (2020). Stalin: Passage to Revolution. Princeton: Princeton University Press. ISBN 978-0691182032.
