= Məmişlər, Sabirabad =

Məmişlər
- Municipality
- Location within Azerbaijan
- Coordinates: 40°01′39″N 48°32′49″E
- Country: Azerbaijan
- Rayon: Sabirabad

Population
  - Total: 1,433
- Time zone: UTC+4 (AZT)
  - Summer (DST): UTC+5 (AZT)

Məmişlər (also, Mamishlar and Mamyshlyar, known as Şaumyanovka until 1992) is a village and municipality in the Sabirabad Rayon of Azerbaijan. It has a population of 1,433.
