= Shahumyan, Yerevan =

Shahumyan
- Location within Armenia
- Coordinates: 40°11′05″N 44°27′35″E
- Country: Armenia
- Marz (Province): Yerevan
- District: Malatia-Sebastia
- Time zone: UTC+4 ( )
  - Summer (DST): UTC+5 ( )

Shahumyan (Armenian: Շահումյան, also, Imeni Shaumyana, Imeni Beriya, Shaumyan, and Posëlok Imeni Shaumyana) is a town in the Yerevan Province of Armenia. The town was named after Stepan Shahumyan, a Bolshevik commissar.
