= On the Cult of Personality and Its Consequences =

1956 speech by Soviet leader Nikita Khrushchev

"On the Cult of Personality and Its Consequences" (Russian: «О культе личности и его последствиях», romanized: "O kul'te lichnosti i yego posledstviyakh") was a speech given by Nikita Khrushchev, the leader of the Soviet Union, on February 25, 1956. It was formally a report by the First Secretary of the Communist Party of the Soviet Union (a position held by Khrushchev) to the 20th Congress of the Communist Party of the Soviet Union.

It is popularly known as the Secret Speech (Russian: секретный доклад Хрущёва, romanized: sekretnyi doklad Khrushchyova) because the session was not open to journalists or non-party members, and the Central Committee classified it as "not for publication". Copies of the speech were read out at thousands of local meetings of the Communist Party of the Soviet Union (CPSU) and Komsomol organizations across the USSR, so its general content was widely known. The full text circulated informally and was published in the West within weeks, but was not published in the Soviet Union until 1989.

Khrushchev's speech sharply criticized the rule of Joseph Stalin, the previous Soviet leader who had died in March 1953. Khrushchev condemned Stalin's purges, particularly the Great Purge of the late 1930s. He also charged Stalin with having fostered a cult of personality in himself as national leader, while ostensibly supporting communist ideals. The speech initiated the period of liberalization known as the "Khrushchev Thaw" in the Soviet bloc and the process of de-Stalinization.

The speech shocked party members. Contemporary reports state that some listeners suffered heart attacks and inspired suicides, due to the shock Khrushchev's criticisms and condemnations of the Communist government under Stalin, a previously revered figure. In Tbilisi, Georgia (Stalin's native country) widespread demonstrations by pro-Stalin protestors took place from March 4–10, 1956. They began on the 3rd anniversary of Stalin's death in reaction to the Secret Speech. On March 9, 1956, the Soviet army fired on the protestors; casualty numbers are disputed in the range of dozens to hundreds. Other (less violent) popular demonstrations against Stalin's legacy took place in cities and gulags across the Soviet Union.

== Background ==
After Stalin's death, thousands of political prisoners and deported persons returned to the USSR, and Stalin's influential police chief Lavrentiy Beria's arrest and execution expanded knowledge of Stalin's crimes. Khrushchev was a key figure in exposing information about Stalin's crimes and working to undo some of his injustices, such as false imprisonments.

The issue of mass repressions was known to Soviet leaders well before the speech. The Pospelov Commission (chairman Pyotr Pospelov, P.T. Komarov, Averky Aristov, and Nikolai Shvernik), created by Khrushchev on December 31, 1955, had investigated the repressions of the delegates of the 17th Congress of the All-Union Communist Party (Bolsheviks) in 1934. The speech's content was based on the special commission's findings.

The Pospelov Commission targeted the 17th Congress for investigations because it was known as "the Congress of Victors" in the country of "victorious socialism" and so the enormous number of "enemies" among the participants demanded explanation. The commission met in early 1956 and presented evidence that in 1937 and 1938 (the peak of the period known as the Great Purge), Stalin had over one-and-a-half million individuals arrested for "anti-Soviet activities," of whom over 680,500 were executed, the majority being long-time CPSU members.

After hearing the contents of the Pospelov Commission's report, Khrushchev decided he had an obligation to expose the crimes of Stalin. On February 13, the Secret Speech was authorized. In the following days before the speech, Khrushchev, Pospelov, Aristov, and other party members created, contributed to, and edited the speech.

== Speech ==
The public session of the 20th Congress had come to a formal end on 24 February 1956, when word was spread to delegates to return to the Great Hall of the Kremlin for an additional "closed session" to which journalists, guests and delegates from "fraternal parties" from outside the Soviet Union were not invited. Special passes were issued to those eligible to participate, with an additional 100 former party members, who had been recently released from the Soviet prison camp network, added to the assembly to add moral effect.

Premier Nikolai Bulganin, chairman of the Council of Ministers of the Soviet Union and then an ally of Khrushchev, called the session to order and immediately yielded the floor to Khrushchev, who began his speech shortly after midnight on 25 February. For the next four hours, Khrushchev delivered "On the Cult of Personality and Its Consequences" before stunned delegates. Several people became ill during the tense report and had to be removed from the hall.

Khrushchev read from a prepared report, and no stenographic record of the closed session was kept. No questions or debate followed Khrushchev's presentation and delegates left the hall in a state of acute disorientation. The same evening, the delegates of foreign communist parties were called to the Kremlin and given the opportunity to read the prepared text of the Khrushchev speech, which was treated as a top secret state document.

== Summary ==
Khrushchev presented to the Congress a speech which denounced Stalin and exalted Lenin. He began his speech with a recount of the conflict between Stalin and Lenin. He presented on the contents of the Pospelov report and mass repression. He accused Stalin of many errors from the time before and during World War II. He touched on the exiles of entire peoples during the war as well. He also accused Stalin of foreign policy and agricultural policy failures. Khrushchev did not report on deportations from Poland or the Baltic, the Katyn Massacre, Holodomor, Dekulakization, and other atrocities during the Stalin era that were not a result of Stalin's singular direct action. He failed to mention nonparty members that were victims of Stalin. Khrushchev was a staunch party man and lauded Leninism and communist ideology in his speech as often as he condemned Stalin's actions. Stalin, Khrushchev argued, was the primary victim of the deleterious effect of the cult of personality, which, through his existing flaws, had transformed him from a crucial part of the victories of Lenin into a paranoiac man who was easily influenced by the "rabid enemy of our party", Lavrentiy Beria.

The basic structure of the speech was as follows:

- Repudiation of Stalin's cult of personality.
  - Quotations from the classics of Marxism–Leninism which denounced the "cult of an individual", especially the Karl Marx letter to a German worker that stated his antipathy toward it.
  - Lenin's Testament and remarks by Nadezhda Krupskaya (former People's Commissar for Education and wife of Lenin), about Stalin's character, and Lenin's recommendation to remove Stalin from his position as Secretary General of the party.
  - Before Stalin, the fight with Trotskyism was purely ideological; Stalin introduced the notion of the "enemy of the people" to be used as "heavy artillery" from the late 1920s.
  - Stalin violated the party norms of collective leadership.
    - Repression of the majority of Old Bolsheviks and delegates of the 17th Congress, most of whom were workers and had joined the party before 1920. Of the 1,966 delegates, 1,108 were later declared "counter-revolutionaries"; 848 were executed. 98 of the 139 delegates who had become members or candidate members of the Central Committee were declared "enemies of the people".
    - After the repression, Stalin ceased even to consider the collective opinion of the party.
  - Examples of repression of some notable Bolsheviks were presented in detail.
  - Stalin's order for the persecution to be enhanced: the NKVD was "four years late" in crushing the opposition, according to his principle of "aggravation of class struggle".
    - Falsification of evidence and records to meet Stalin's "plans" for the number of enemies to be uncovered.
  - Stalin's exaggeration of his role in the Great Patriotic War (World War II).
  - Deportations of whole nationalities.
  - The Doctors' plot and Mingrelian affair.
  - Manifestations of personality cult: songs, city names and so on.
    - Lyrics of the State Anthem of the Soviet Union (first version, 1944–1953), which had references to Stalin.
- The non-awarding of the Lenin State Prize since 1935, which should be corrected at once by the Supreme Soviet and the Council of Ministers.
- Repudiating the socialist realist literary policy under Stalin, also known as Zhdanovism, which affected literary works.

== Circulation ==
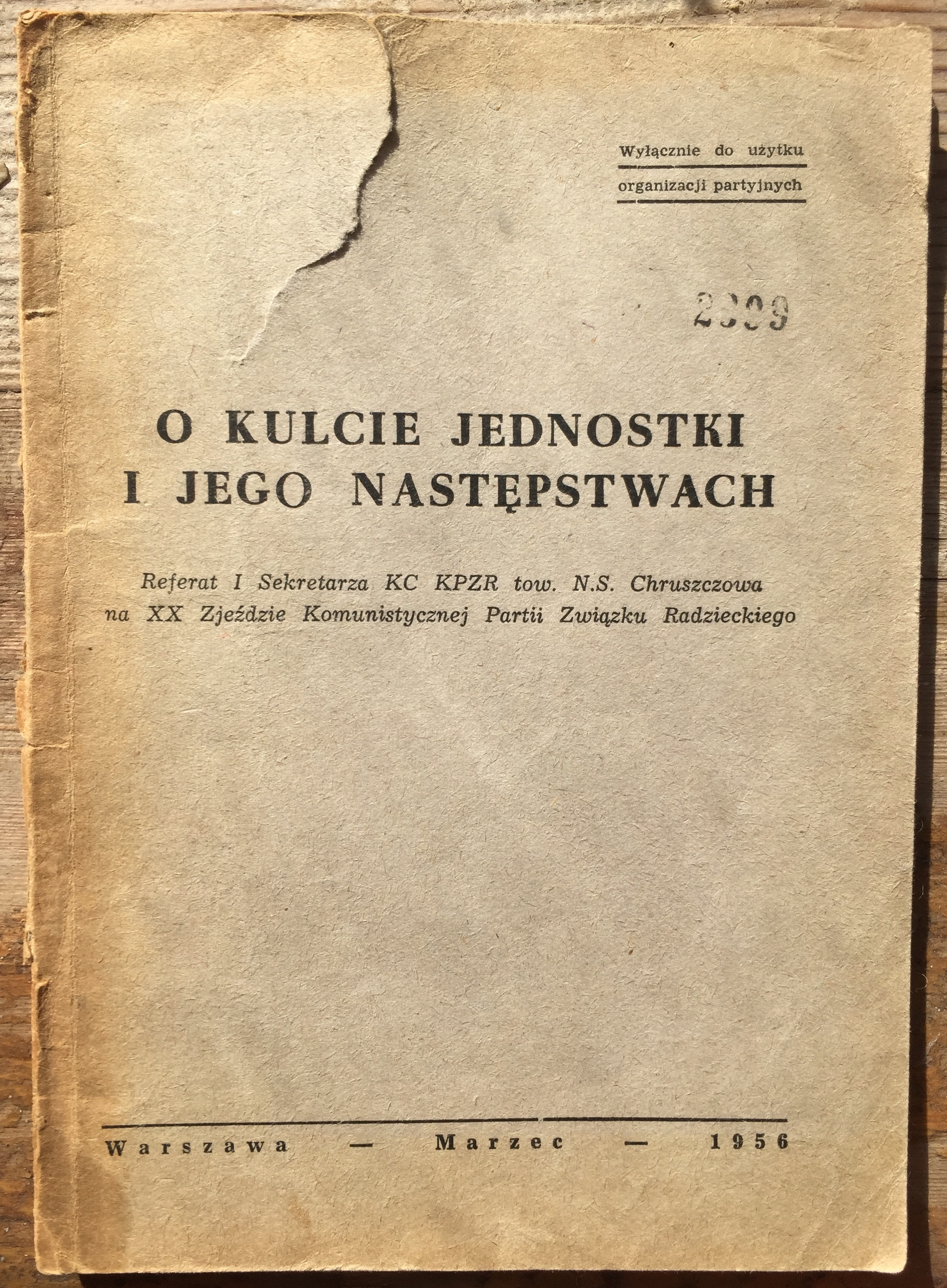
O kulcie jednostki i jego następstwach, Polish March 1956 print of the Secret Speech for the inner use in the PUWP

On 1 March, the text of the Khrushchev speech was distributed in printed form to senior Central Committee functionaries. That was followed, on 5 March, by a reduction of the document's secrecy classification from "Top Secret" to "Not for Publication". The Party Central Committee ordered that Khrushchev's Report be read at all gatherings of Communist and Komsomol local units, with non-party activists invited to attend the proceedings. More than 25 million people heard the speech's contents through this process. The Soviet press officially published the full text of the speech in 1989, during the waning years of the USSR.

The CPSU was not the only group circulating the speech. While the Central Committee determined that the speech must stay a secret as it had the ability to threaten the regime, Khrushchev could only gain from its circulation. The speech would insulate his power and force a policy of de-Stalinization across the communist world. Khrushchev's circulation of the speech had to be covert, so he used a method of "controlled, gradual, limited leaks" using the KGB.

The spread of the speech began immediately. Shortly after the conclusion of the speech, a Soviet acquaintance urgently briefed Reuters journalist John Rettie, then stationed in Moscow, about Khrushchev's speech and its general content. After consulting with his boss at Reuters, together they decided the leaked information was credible. He subsequently published a story on the Secret Speech, requesting that his name and Moscow byline be removed. In mid-March Rettie confirmed the rumors spreading concerning the Secret Speech to the western press. In retrospect, Rettie believed that the leak was authorized by Khrushchev himself.

The Polish government also held a crucial role in the spread of the speech. They made thousands of copies, contacted news outlets, and played the speech in its full length on the Polish radio. Due to the widespread dissemination of the speech throughout the Soviet world, it is highly likely that multiple copies reached the CIA and western media, and that it wasn't one singular leak that reached outside of the east.

The speech was known worldwide within two weeks, and The New York Times published the report in its entirety on 5 June 1956. Once it was published by The New York Times the speech was translated and published in countries across the globe. Therefore, the "Secret Speech" as a colloquial name is a misnomer.

On 30 June 1956, the Central Committee of the party issued a resolution, "On Overcoming the Cult of the Individual and Its Consequences", which served as the CPSU's official and public pronouncement on the Stalin era. Written under the guidance of Mikhail Suslov, it did not mention Khrushchev's specific allegations. "Complaining that Western political circles were exploiting the revelation of Stalin's crimes, the resolution paid tribute to [Stalin's] services" and was relatively guarded in its criticisms of him.

== Influence and impact ==
Khrushchev's speech was followed by a period of liberalization, known as the Khrushchev Thaw, into the early 1960s. In 1961, the body of Stalin was removed from public view in Lenin's Mausoleum and buried in the Kremlin Wall Necropolis.

The most direct impact of the speech, the 1956 Georgian demonstrations, occurred in Tbilisi, Georgia, between 4-10 of March 1956. 5 March 1956 marked the third anniversary of Stalin's death, but there was no official recognition or celebration. The spread of the speech was also well underway, and it particularly impacted the people of Georgia as it was Stalin's homeland. At first, the protests were unofficial and largely peaceful as many in the crowds commemorated the memory of Stalin. Protesters organized around the Stalin monument on the Kura river. The Georgian government approved an official demonstration on the ninth. On the tenth, the government deployed the police and army on the protesters. Some accounts state that the protesters had first turned violent and were causing chaos and destruction on the city and refer to the event as the 1956 Georgian riots. Official records state that fifteen people were killed and fifty-four were injured or wounded; however, these records are highly suspect, and it is thought that is it much more likely that hundreds were killed and wounded. The press did not publish any mention of the Georgian demonstrations.

Throughout the western world, many communist party members reported that there was a large exit from the communist party. This division within the communist party was not limited to the western world. Those in the Soviet Union had to reckon with this new information, and it caused major division within the country. For many the speech was a sign of hope. As it spread to the prisons and gulags, people rejoiced. In the summer of 1956, Khrushchev undertook a major reform that would lead to release of most political prisoners, the destruction of multiple gulags, and the review of criminal cases. Khrushchev created a special commission to examine the stories and records of these prisoners, evaluating upwards of two million cases. The Central Committee also rehabilitated many of those who had lost their lives from Stalin's regime. However, the labor camp system did stay in place. This work was left a public secret.

The Secret Speech also ignited major political changes and violent protests throughout the Eastern Bloc, the two most notable being the Polish October and the Hungarian Revolution of 1956. Both governments were headed by unpopular Stalinist governments, so the new policy of de-Stalinization that was disseminated through the Secret Speech led to uproar. Khrushchev did not work with anyone from the Eastern Bloc before giving the speech. Bolesław Bierut, the president of Poland, was in the hospital for pneumonia when he heard the speech. It was rumored that he died from a heart attack at hearing the report. His death left a gap in the already vulnerable political landscape. Violent protests began in June and continued into October as the Poles looked to gain more autonomy from the Soviets. Khrushchev threatened Soviet invasion, but he eventually conceded. The Polish October marked the end of Stalinism in Poland, but communism still headed the government.

Meanwhile in Hungary, a similar crisis occurred; however, it became much more violent. On 23 October 1956, students organized a massive demonstration in Budapest where they went to listen to Imre Nagy, a Hungarian politician turned leader of the anti-Soviet Hungarian Revolution, stormed the radio station, and ripped down a statue of Stalin. Hungarian security and police attempted to put down the protest by firing into the crowd, but the rebels overtook them. Khrushchev called for Soviet intervention. On 24 October 1956, tanks and troops arrived in Budapest. In the following days, there were tens of thousands of casualties on both sides until the Soviet victory on 10 November 1956. The events that took place incited protest and action across the Eastern Bloc.

The speech is central to the period of liberalization known as the "Khrushchev Thaw" in the Soviet bloc and to the process of de-Stalinization. It was cited as a major cause of the Sino-Soviet split of 1961 to 1989 by China (under Chairman Mao Zedong) and by Albania (under First Secretary Enver Hoxha), who condemned Khrushchev as a revisionist. In response, they formed the anti-revisionist movement, criticizing the post-Stalin leadership of the Communist Party of the Soviet Union for allegedly deviating from the path of Lenin and Stalin. In North Korea, factions of the Workers' Party of Korea unsuccessfully attempted to remove Chairman Kim Il Sung in August 1956, after criticizing Kim for not "correcting" his leadership methods, for developing a personality cult, for distorting the "Leninist principle of collective leadership and socialist legality" (i.e. using arbitrary arrest and executions of political opponents) and using other Khrushchev-era criticisms of Stalinism against Kim Il Sung's actions. They were later purged and executed.

== Criticism ==
Polish philosopher Leszek Kołakowski criticized Khrushchev in 1978 for failing to make any analysis of the system Stalin presided over, stating:

Stalin had simply been a criminal and a maniac, personally to blame for all the nation's defeats and misfortunes. As to how, and in what social conditions, a bloodthirsty paranoiac could for twenty-five years exercise unlimited despotic power over a country of two hundred million inhabitants, which throughout that period had been blessed with the [allegedly] most progressive and democratic system of government in human history—to this enigma the speech offered no clue whatever. All that was certain was that the Soviet system and the party itself remained impeccably pure and bore no responsibility for the tyrant's atrocities.

Bangladeshi historian A. M. Amzad commented on the speech:

It (the speech) was an undesirable, uncalled for and irresponsible act in terms of the ideology of the Soviet Union. It was designed to determine Khrushchev's political fate. Even before the Twentieth Congress, arrangements were made to resolve the ills of Stalin's dictatorship. Thus, such criticism of Stalin at the Twentieth Congress was deliberate.

Western historians also tended to take a somewhat critical view of the speech. J. Arch Getty commented in 1985 that "Khrushchev's revelations [...] are almost entirely self-serving. It is hard to avoid the impression that the revelations had political purposes in Khrushchev's struggle with Molotov, Malenkov, and Kaganovich". The historian Geoffrey Roberts said Khrushchev's speech became "one of the key texts of western historiography of the Stalin era. But many western historians were sceptical about Khrushchev's efforts to lay all the blame for past communist crimes on Stalin".

On 6 July 2025, a Communist Party of the Russian Federation congress adopted a resolution calling the report "erroneous".

== See also ==
- Anti-Stalinist left
