= Kirov, Kirov Oblast =

City in Kirov Oblast, Russia

Kirov Киров
- City
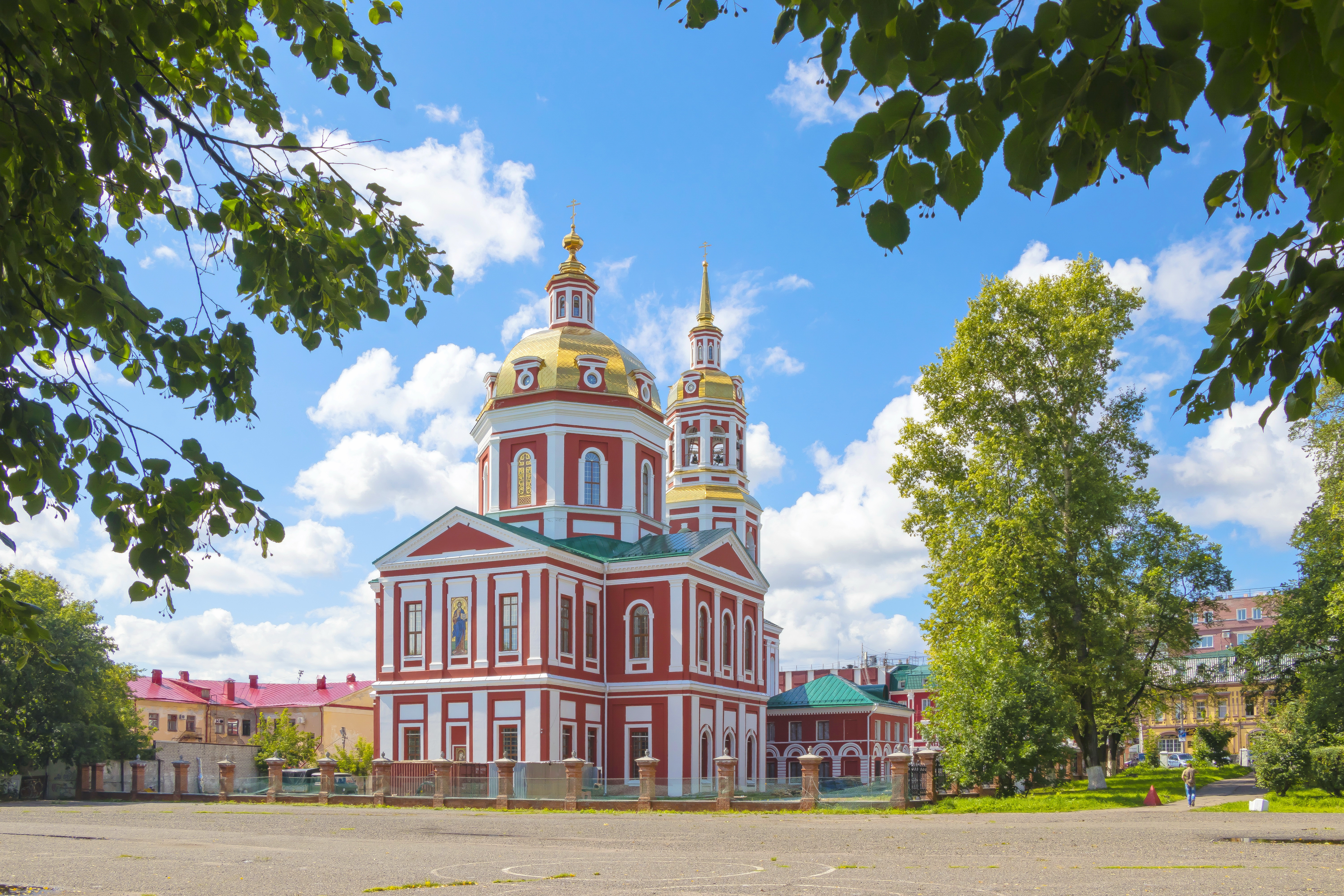
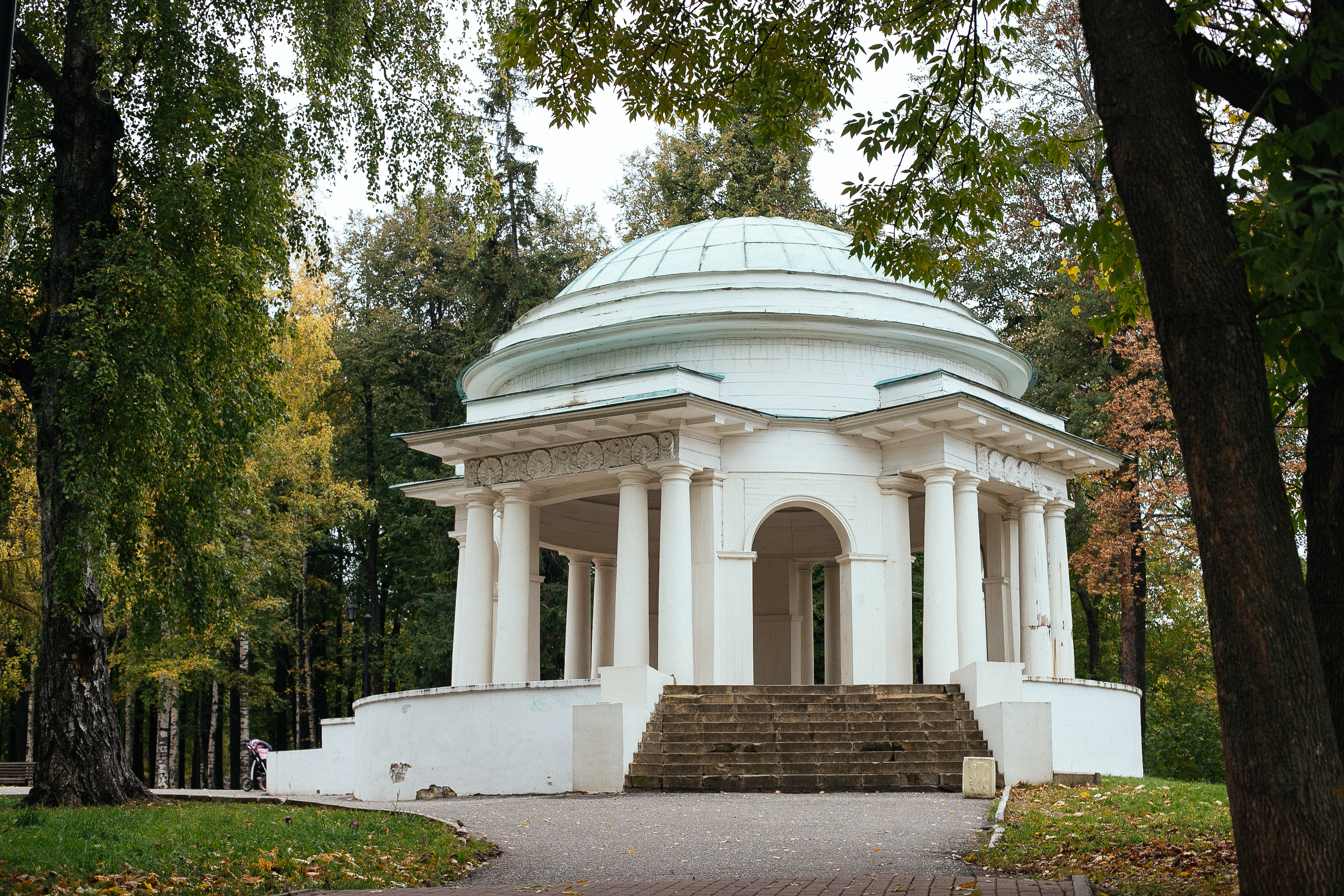
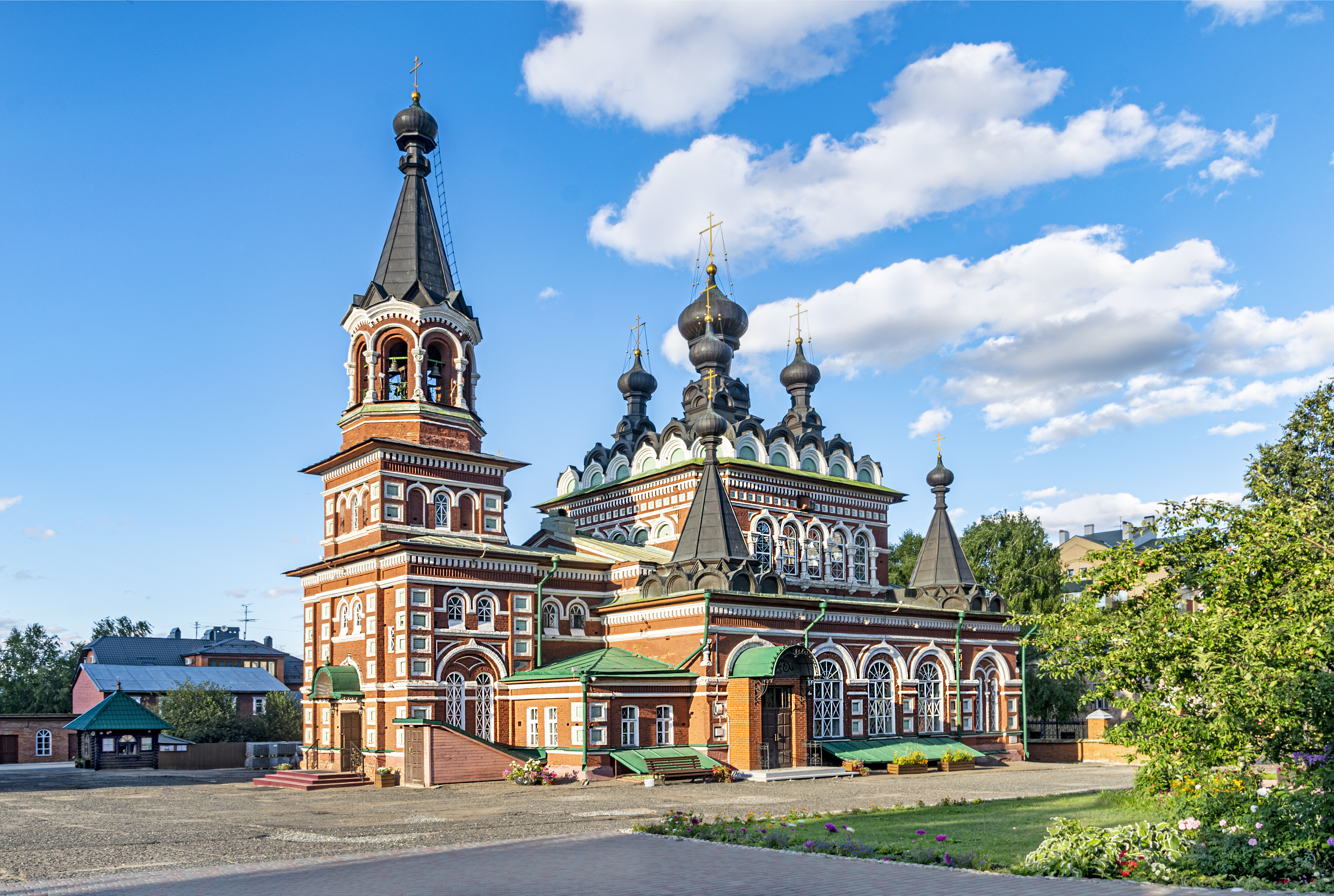
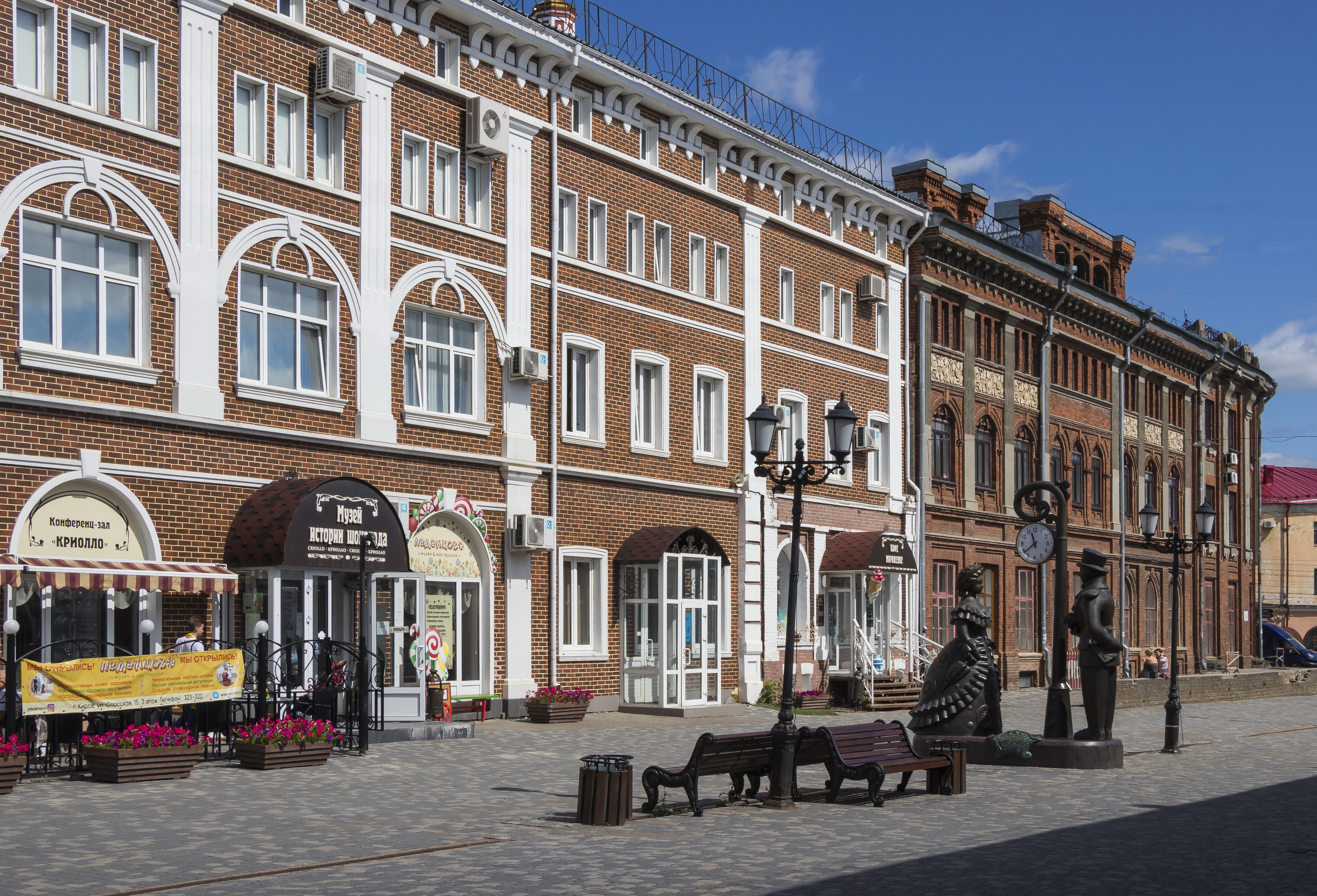
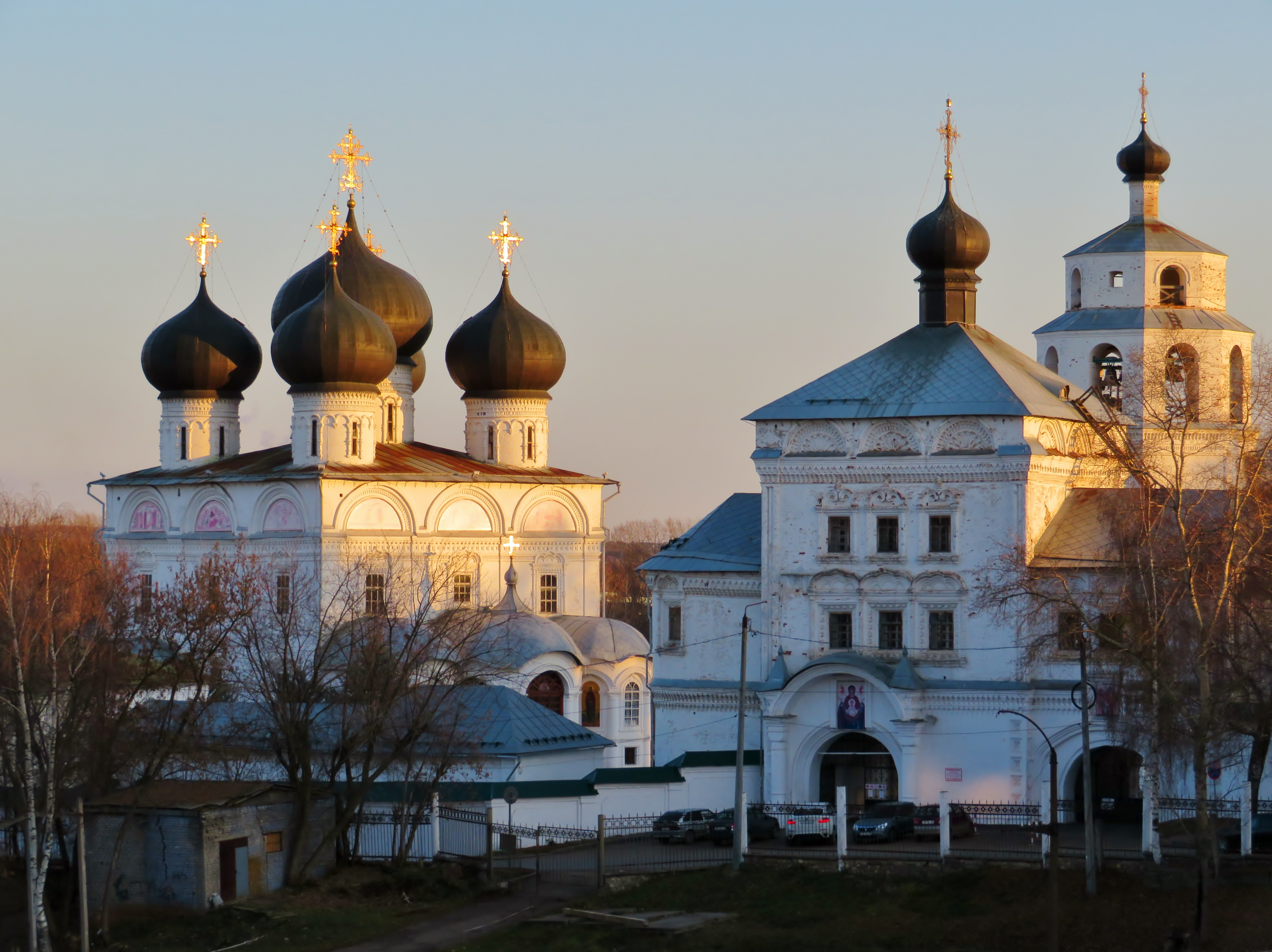
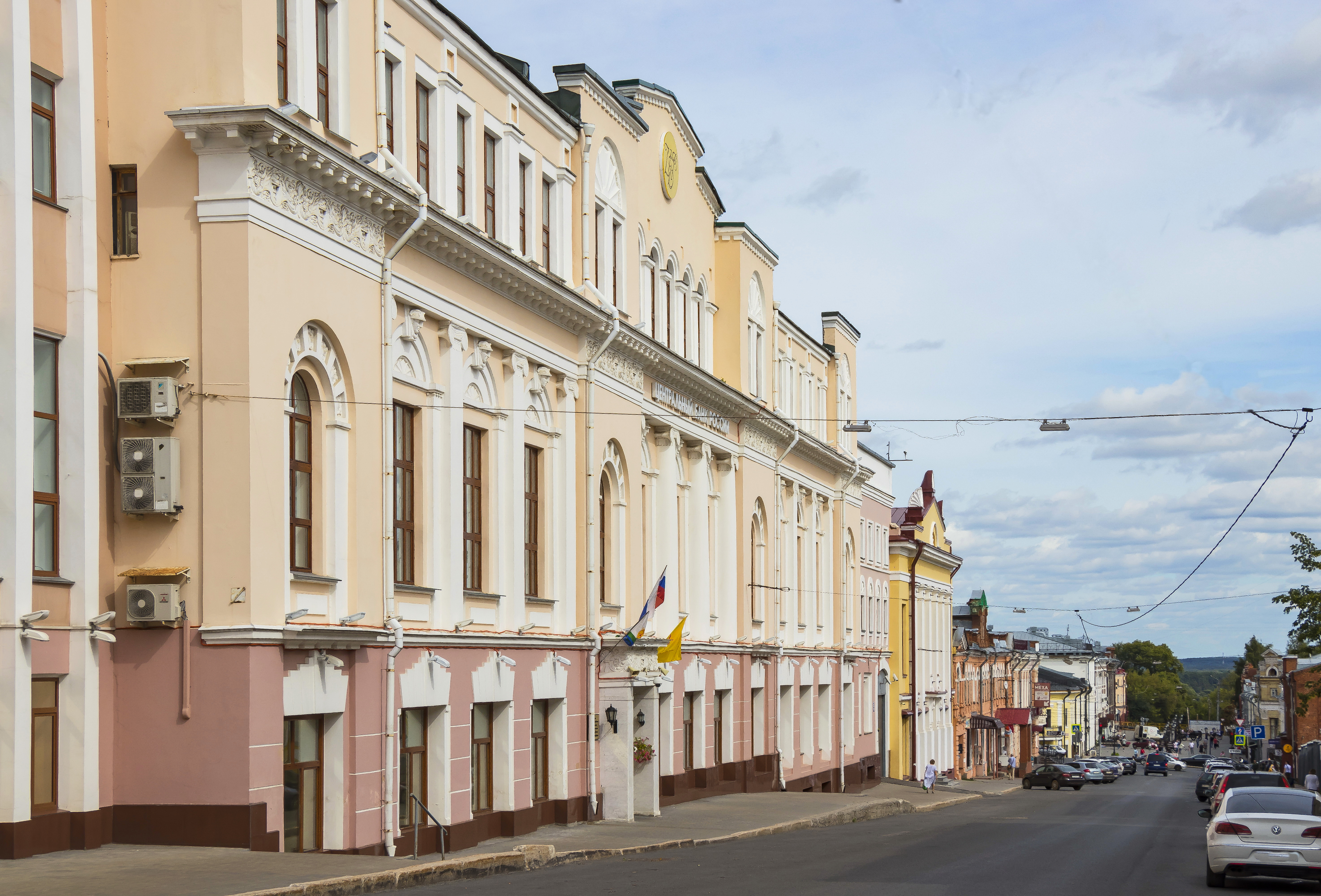
- Spassky Cathedral Rotunda in Alexander Garden Seraphim Church Spasskaya Shopping Complex Trifonov Monastery Historic Bank Building

- Flag Coat of arms
- Interactive map of Kirov
- Location of Kirov Kirov (European Russia) Kirov (Europe)
- Coordinates: 58°36′N 49°41′E
- Country: Russia
- Federal subject: Kirov Oblast
- First mentioned: 1374

Government
  - Body: City Duma
  - Head: Kovaleva Elena

Area
  - Total: 757.0 km^{2} (292.3 sq mi)
- Elevation: 150 m (490 ft)

Population (2010 Census)
  - Total: 473,695
  - Estimate (2025): 475,871 (+0.5%)
  - Rank: 38th in 2010
  - Density: 625.8/km^{2} (1,621/sq mi)

Administrative status
  - Subordinated to: City of Kirov
  - Capital of: Kirov Oblast, City of Kirov

Municipal status
  - Urban okrug: Kirov Urban Okrug
  - Capital of: Kirov Urban Okrug
- Time zone: UTC+3 (MSK)
- Postal code: List: 610000–610002, 610004–610011, 610013–610021, 610025–610027, 610029–610031, 610033, 610035, 610037, 610040, 610042, 610044–610048, 610050, 610051, 610890, 610899, 610960–610967, 610990, 610995, 610999
- Dialing code: +7 8332
- OKTMO ID: 33701000001
- City Day: observed in June

Kirov (Russian: Киров, IPA: [ˈkʲirəf]), formerly known as Vyatka (Russian: Вя́тка, IPA: [[ˈvʲatka]]) until 1934 and as Khlynov (Хлы́нов) from 1457 to 1780, is the largest city and administrative center of Kirov Oblast, Russia. It is situated on the Vyatka River in European Russia, 896 kilometres (557 mi) northeast of Moscow. Its population was 468,212 in 2021, up to roughly 750 thousand residents in the urban agglomeration.

The city was founded in 1374 (according to other sources in 1181). It was the center of Vyatka Land, which was settled by Russians during the Middle Ages. It was renamed Kirov after the Bolshevik politician Sergei Kirov in 1934, even though he never visited the city.

It is an important economic, transportation, industrial, educational and cultural center in Volga-Vyatka region. It is also home to the many Russian folk crafts, such as Dymkovo toys, vyatka lace and carving on a capa-root. In the historic part of the city there are many universities, theaters, museums and churches.

== History ==
=== Principality and republic ===
The native Slavic tribe in Central Russia and the Volga region, the Vyatichi (also called Viatichi), mixed here with the Novgorodian Slovenes and Finno-Ugric peoples.

According to the "Tale of the Vyatka Country", the city was founded on the Balaskov Field either in 1181 or in 1199. Based on archaeological data, the emergence of the city should be attributed to the middle-end of the 13 century.

Kirov itself was first mentioned (as Vyatka) for the first time in 1374, when Novgorodian ushkuyniks plundered it on their way to Bolghar. Vyatka was governed by a public assembly (veche) like the other northern Russian republics of Pskov and Novgorod.

At different times in the late 14th and 15th centuries, Vyatka militias raided Ustyug, Novgorod and Tatar lands in the Kama and Volga regions.

In 1412, a battle took place near the city between the Vyatchans and Ustyuzhans. The battle took place at night in a ravine, later named Razderikhinsky. According to one version, the Ustyuzhans came to the aid of the Vyatchans for defense against the Tatars, according to another, they, in alliance with the Moscow princes, wanted to capture the city. In memory of those events, the Vyatka folk festival "Svistoplyaska" appeared, and a chapel in the name of Archangel Michael was built on the bank of the ravine.

Vyatka supported Yury of Zvenigorod during the Muscovite Civil War, and after his party lost to the victorious Vasily II, the Muscovite armies were sent twice to subjugate Vyatka until it was eventually forced to accept the suzerainty of Moscow, while retaining a significant amount of autonomy. In 1469, Vyatka allied with Khan Ibrahim of the Khanate of Kazan and did not take part in the campaign of Ivan III against the khanate.

Until the end of the 15 century, Vyatka land was a self-governing territory. The People's Assembly acted as the main governing body. The most influential group of the feudal class were the boyars, followed by merchants and clergy. The rest of the Vyatchans represented the free communal population and consisted of peasants and artisans.

After several unsuccessful campaigns by Moscow against Vyatka in the 1480s, the latter was finally annexed in 1489.

=== Tsarist Russia ===
In the 17 century, the military significance of Khlynov was replaced by trade: merchants from Siberia, the Urals, Pomerania and other regions came here for the Semenovskaya Fair. In 1657, the Vyatka Diocese was established. It was here that the Vyatka chronicles were created. The Kremlin was completely rebuilt during the reign of Alexis of Russia. Under his son Peter, manufactory production was established.

In 1694, the merchant Spiridon Lyangusov conducted the first trade caravan from Moscow to China after the conclusion of the Russian-Chinese treaty, which allowed mutual trade.

Khlynov became known throughout Russia for its clay statuettes and whistles. The town's oldest surviving monument is the Assumption Cathedral (1689), an imposing structure surmounted by five globular domes.

In 1780, Catherine the Great renamed the town Vyatka and made it the seat of Vyatka Governorate. The town also served as a place of exile, notably for Alexander Herzen, Alexander Vitberg, and Mikhail Saltykov-Shchedrin. As of 1860, there were 14 industrial factories. As of 1861, the city had 1,737 houses, 409 shops, 18 churches, two monasteries, two public parks, a hospital, a prison, a public library, an asylum, and several schools. The city hosted annual fairs at the turn of August and September. Goods traded there included grain, cloth, flaxseed, hempseed, flax, and butter. By the end of the 19th century, it was an important station on the Trans-Siberian railway.

Early 20th-century views of Vyatka

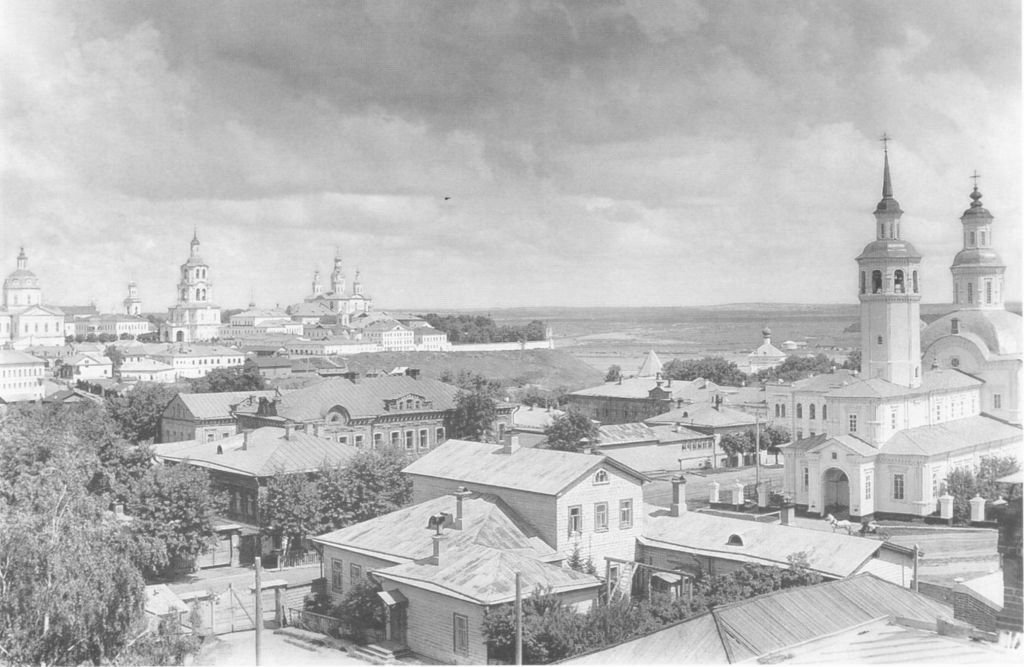
The northwestern part of the city

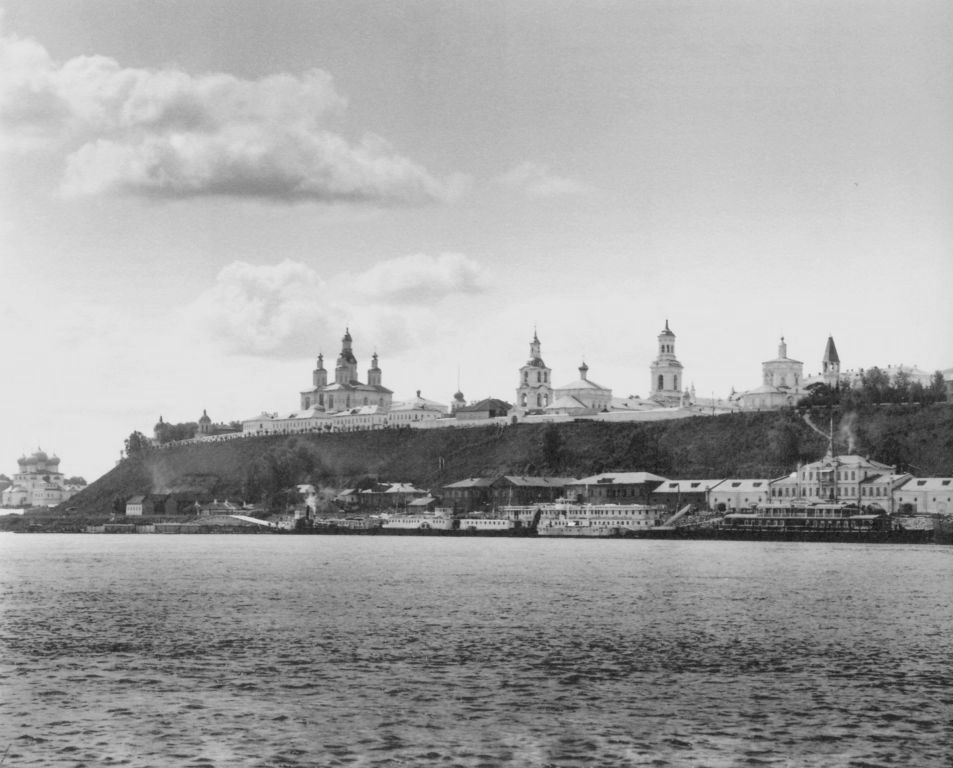
The city wharf

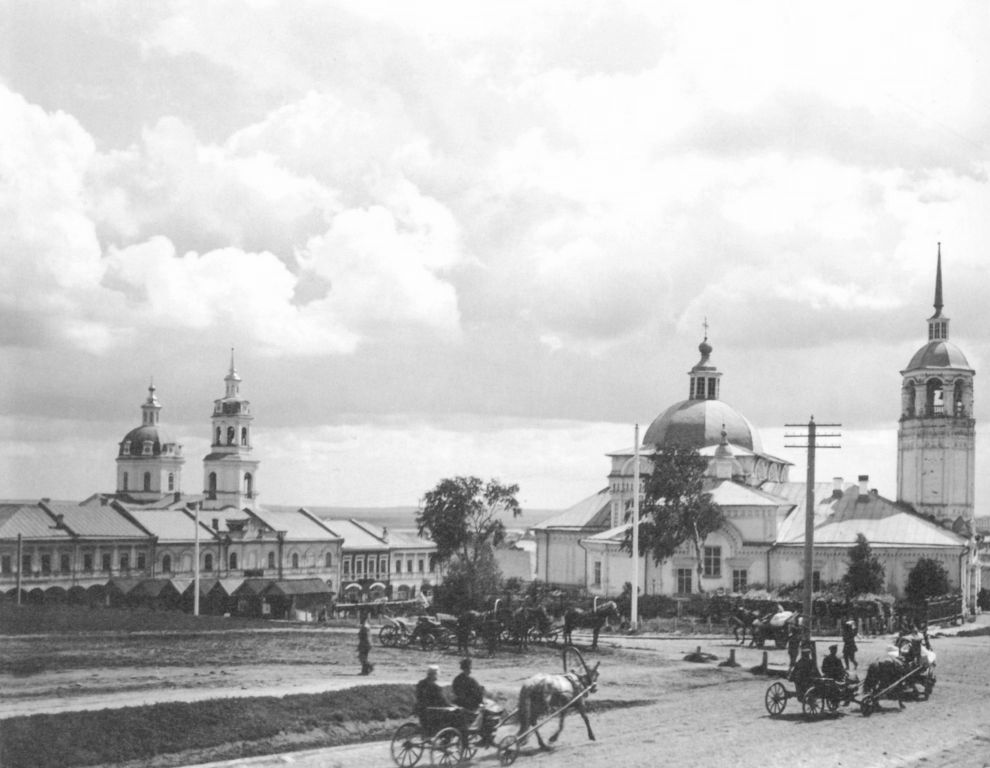
Khlebnaya square

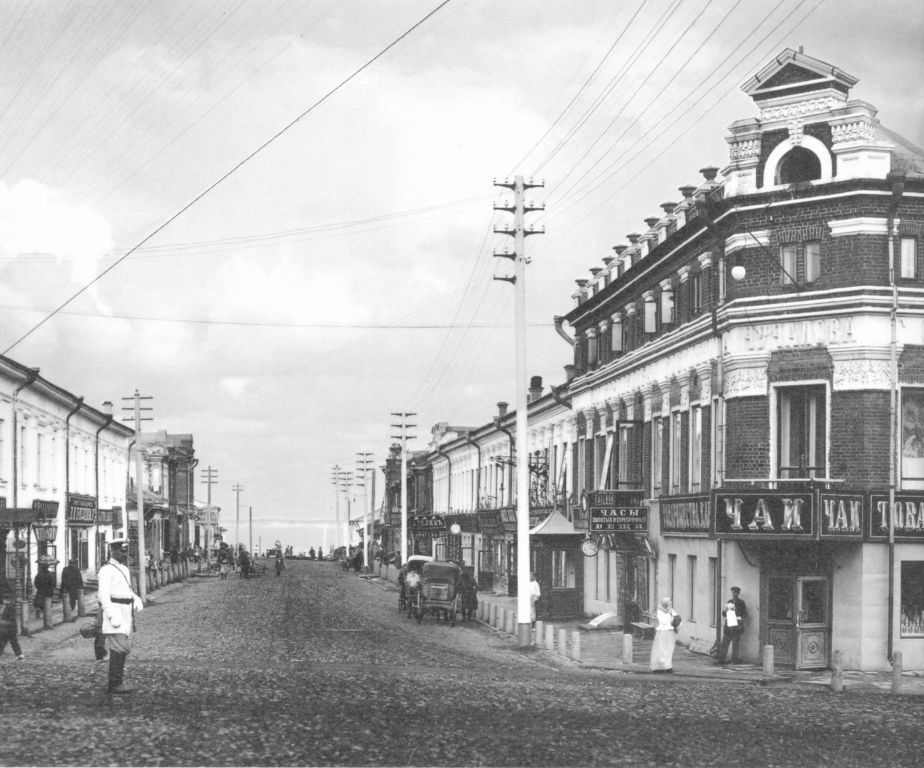
Spasskaya street

=== Soviet period ===
On the eve of the February Revolution, there was no particular aggravation of the social and political struggle in Vyatka province and Vyatka. The October revolution of the Bolsheviks in Petrograd was declared illegal, the provincial governorate remained loyal to the Provisional Government.

The Bolsheviks, until the end of the autumn of 1917, had neither wide fame nor great influence in the city. The arriving detachments of soldiers and sailors, together with local Red Army, played a decisive role in the seizure of power by the Bolsheviks, which did not happen immediately.

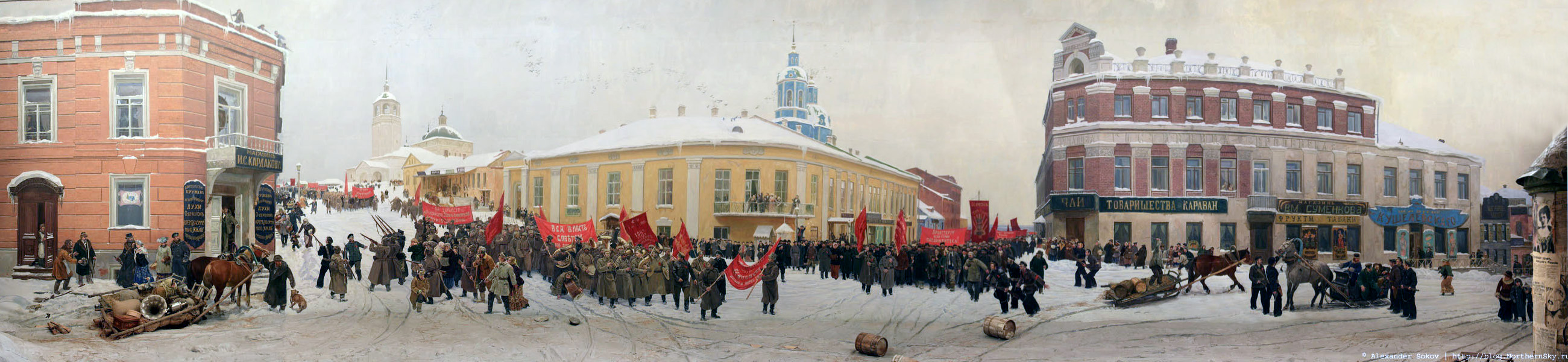
Establishment of Soviet power in Vyatka

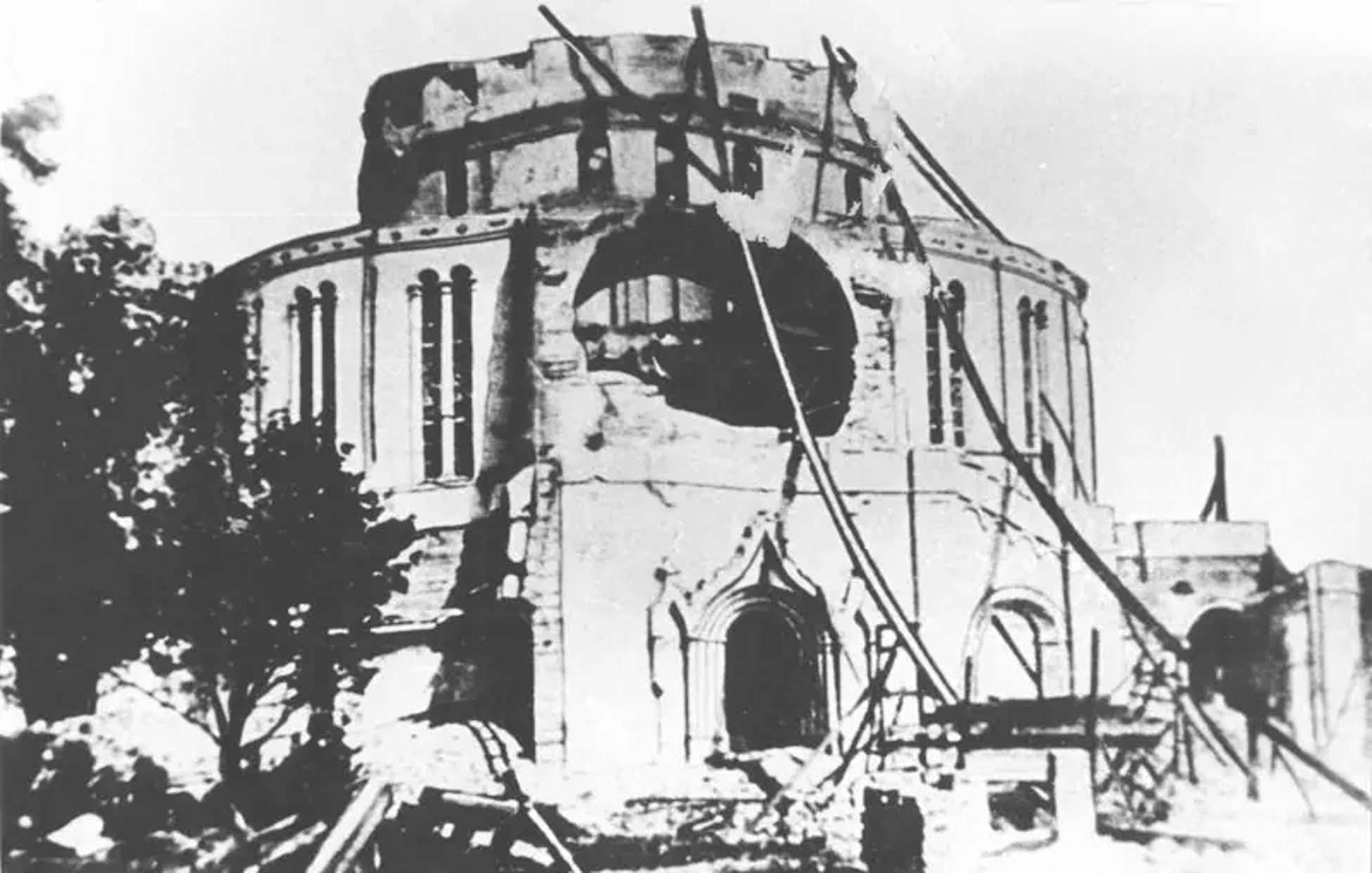
The destruction of the Alexander Nevsky Cathedral

In the 1930s, the destruction of the temple city architecture began. The ensemble of the city Kremlin has been almost completely lost. In 1931 the Holy Trinity Cathedral was destroyed, in 1937 the Alexander Nevsky was blown up. Many temples managed to survive, but they were rebuilt for other, non-religious needs. Thus, the Spassky Cathedral and the Trifonov Monastery lost their towers. The Cathedral mosque, underwent the same process. In the future, the appearance of these buildings will be restored.

On 1934, regular public transport appeared in the city for the first time.

In December 1934, it was renamed after the Soviet communist party functionary Sergey Kirov, who was assassinated on December 1, who was born in nearby Urzhum, despite him never visiting the city himself.

During the Second World War, due to the evacuation of machine-building plants from Moscow and Leningrad, the Kirov industry was mainly formed.

In the post-war years, new industrial and agricultural enterprises came into operation, active development and mass housing construction began in the western and southern parts of the city.

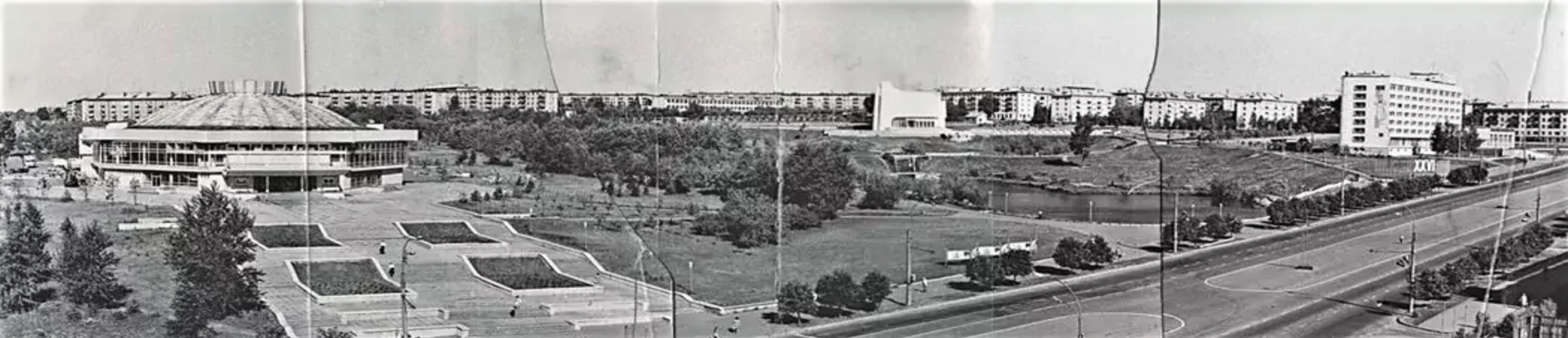
View of Central Park and new districts, 1981

=== Recent history ===
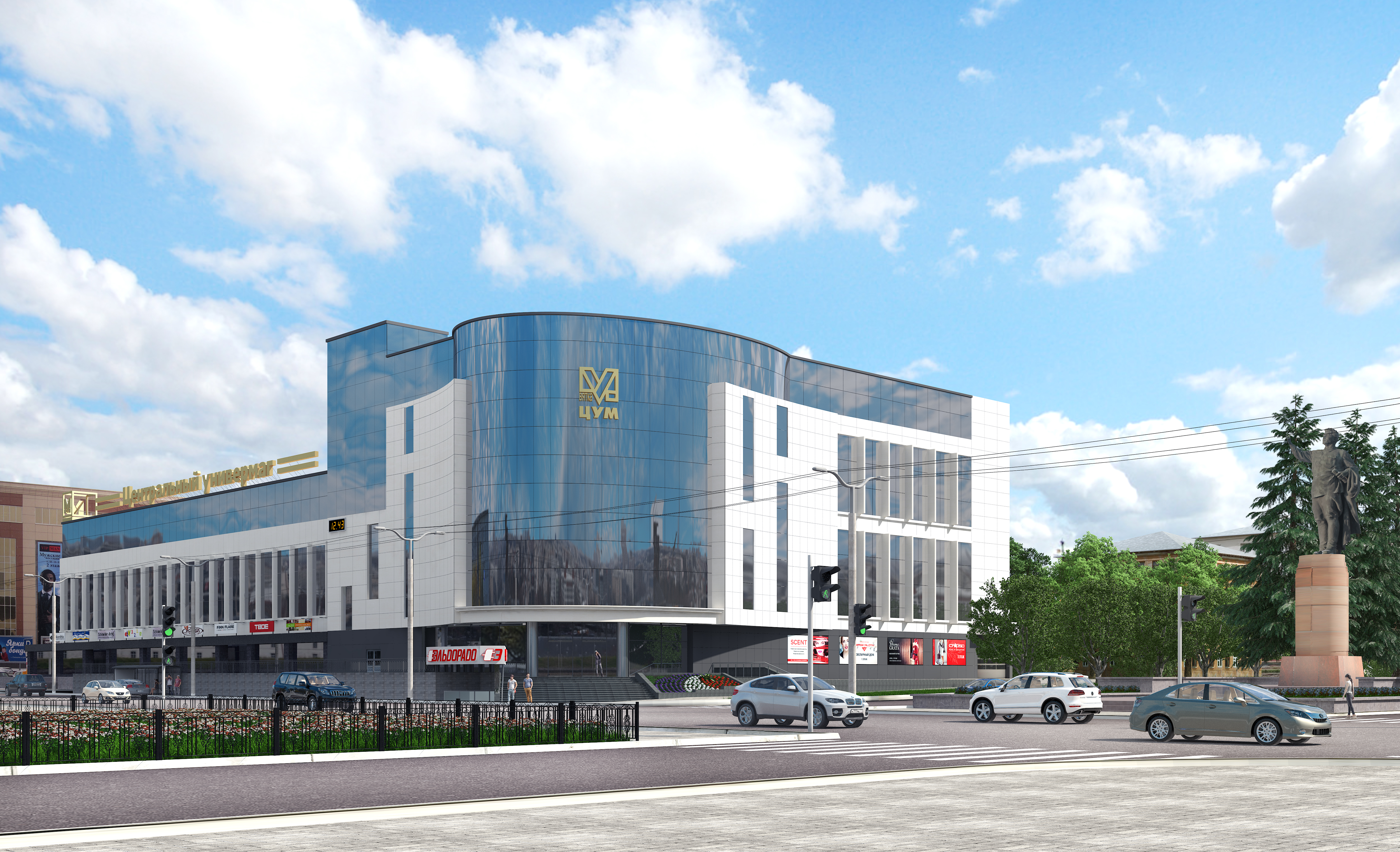

There have been movements to restore the city's original name of Vyatka, although none of them have been successful so far.

Since the 2010s, the city has been actively positioning itself as a venue for various forums and festivals. In particular, the Golden Calf International Short Film Festival, the All-Russian Urban Forum, and the sites of the Atomic Energy Information Center began to be held in the city.

In 2024, the city of Kirov commemorated its 650th anniversary with a series of events and initiatives. Preparations included infrastructure renovations, cultural programs, educational and publishing activities, as well as exhibitions and festivals. The anniversary was marked on June 12 (City Day) and September 22 (City Foundation Day), with over 100 events organized. Key highlights included the theatrical show "The City Created by You", a concert by the band Lyube, a fireworks display, a gastronomic festival, and a performance by the aerobatic team "Strizhi".

== Administrative and municipal status ==
Historical population
Year	Pop.	±%
1861	15,153	—
1897	25,000	+65.0%
1926	61,223	+144.9%
1939	143,558	+134.5%
1959	252,416	+75.8%
1970	332,503	+31.7%
1979	389,533	+17.2%
1989	440,240	+13.0%
2002	457,578	+3.9%
2010	473,695	+3.5%
2021	468,212	−1.2%
Source:, census data

Kirov is the administrative center of the oblast. Within the framework of administrative divisions, it is, together with 134 rural localities, incorporated as the City of Kirov—an administrative unit with the status equal to that of the districts. As a municipal division, the City of Kirov is incorporated as Kirov Urban Okrug.

The city of Kirov is divided into 4 urban districts: Leninsky, Oktyabrsky, Pervomaysky and Novovyatsky.

== Economy ==
The basis of the economic potential of the city of Kirov is the manufacturing sector — manufacturing industries; enterprises that produce and distribute electricity, gas and water; transport, construction organizations and communication enterprises.

The city of Kirov is known in Russia and abroad for the products of heavy engineering, aircraft and machine tool construction, woodworking and light industry, folk crafts. Washing machines, electric stoves, furniture, skis, wood stove, tires, leather and fur products are produced here.

The leading industries of the city of Kirov are: mechanical engineering and metalworking, metallurgical production, production of rubber and plastic products, food production, woodworking and pulp and paper industry, electric power industry. Their share in the volume of industrial production is 81%.

== Main sights ==
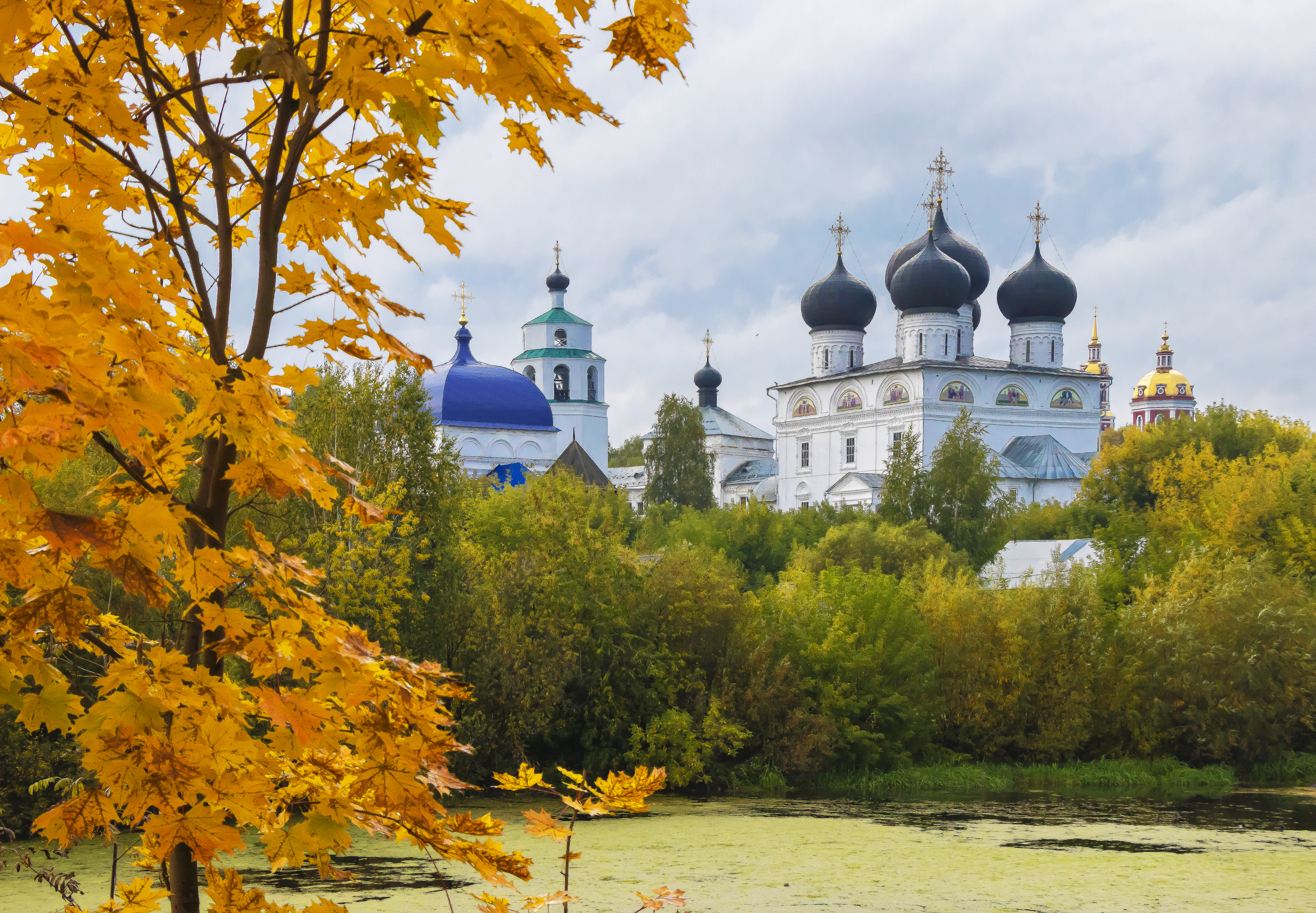
Trifonov Monastery ensemble, view from the Yezhovsky Lake

The main sights of the city are concentrated near Spasskaya Street in the historical part of the city. At the beginning of this street is the ensemble of the Trifonov Monastery, founded in 1580, which includes the main building – the Uspenskiy Cathedral, and several churches around it, surrounded by walls with towers. The monastery has extensive views from the "Arch of the Vyatka Kremlin", located on a hill on the opposite side of Spasskaya Street. The "Arch of the Vyatka Kremlin" actually refers to the former bishop's compound, which was blown up in the 1930s.

Next to the complex of the Trifonov Monastery is the Yezhovsky Lake, along which there is an eco-trail. Among other things, there is a pier on it, which offers a view of the monastery.

Further down Spasskaya Street there is a Klobukov store – one of the first shopping centers of pre-revolutionary Vyatka, made in the Art Nouveau style. Next to it is the Spassky Cathedral, one of the most iconic temples of the city, founded in 1763.

Starting from Klobukov's shop, the pedestrian part of Spasskaya Street begins. On its sides, in the buildings of the former shopping malls, there are the Kirov Museum of Local Lore, the Ice cream Museum, the Chocolate Museum, the "Theater on Spasskaya". Up to Karl Marx Street, there are architectural monuments, cafes and restaurants on Spasskaya Street. These include the building of the main post office – a rare example of constructivism in Vyatka. The Vasnetsov Brothers Art Museum is located at the intersection of Spasskaya and Karl Marx Streets.

Along the Embankment of the Green on a high hill, there is the Alexander Garden, one of the first parks of the city, which has views over the Vyatka River. On the edge of the hill there are white rotundas, which have become one of the symbols of the city. The embankment stretches from the old bridge and ends with a descent to the complex of the Trifonov Monastery.

Along the southern part of Oktyabrsky Avenue, after the intersection with Vorovsky Street, the Central Park of the city is laid out. An artificial two-level pond has been created in the park, on top of which the Diorama building is located. Created according to the original project, it has the shape of a waving flag. A bas-relief was constructed on the upper part. The Diorama building houses the Museum of Revolutionary Events in Vyatka. The Kirov Circus and the Ferris Wheel are also located on the territory of the Central Park.

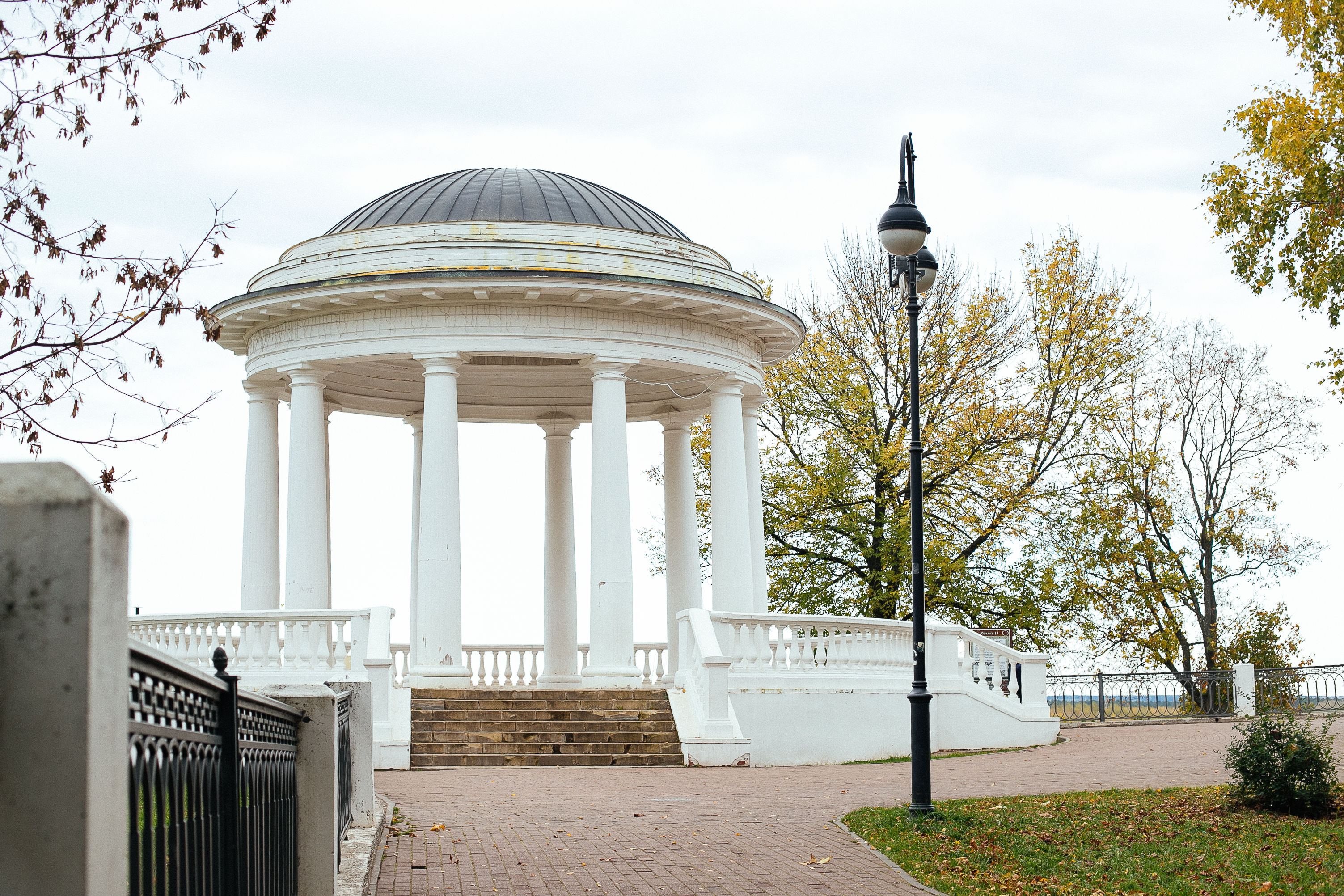
The coastal rotunda in the Alexander Garden

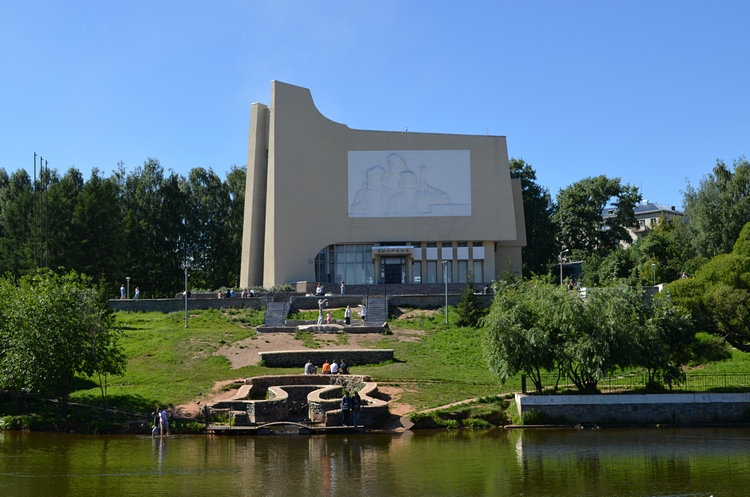
The Diorama building in Central Park

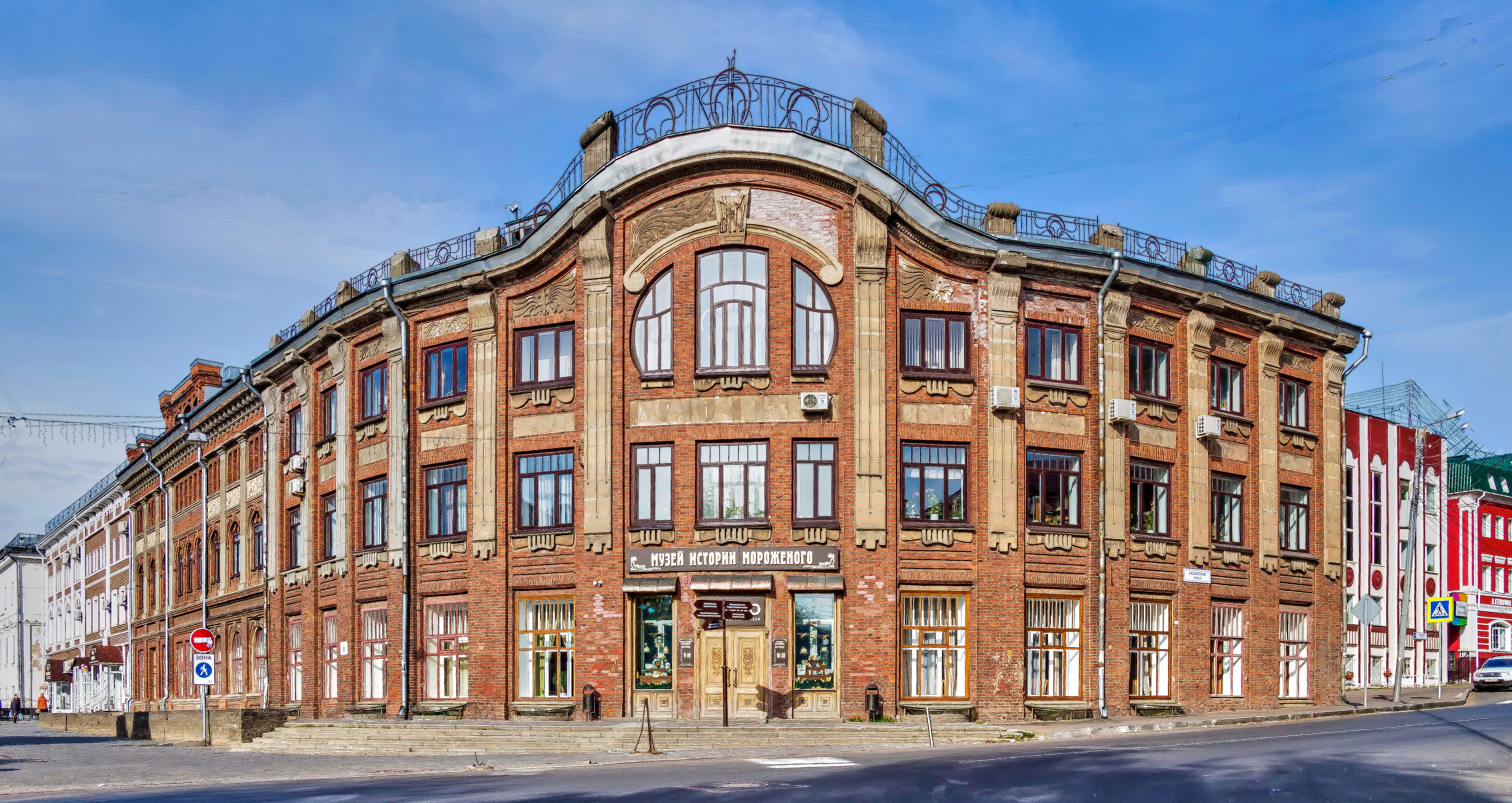
Klobukov's store Building

A ravine runs through the central part of the city, along Gorbachev Street. Its relief was beaten in the area of the intersection of Gorbachev and Karl Marx Streets, where the Botanical Garden at Vyatka University and the square of the 60th anniversary of the USSR (Square named after Grin) were created.

The oldest monument of civil architecture is a Piteyniy dom (lit. 'Drinking house') house located at the intersection of Spasskaya and Kazanskaya streets. The earliest mention of the house dates back to 1771. Now there are exhibitions of the regional Museum of local lore.

A number of the city's mansions are located along the streets of Moskovskaya, Spasskaya, Preobrazhenskaya, Kazanskaya and Lenin. Bulychev's mansion is a particularly notable example of Gothic architecture. Examples of the pre-revolutionary capitalist style are the buildings of the Veretennikov Bank and the Bank of Foreign Trade. Repin's estate and Arshaulov's house are just a few examples of elegant stone architecture.

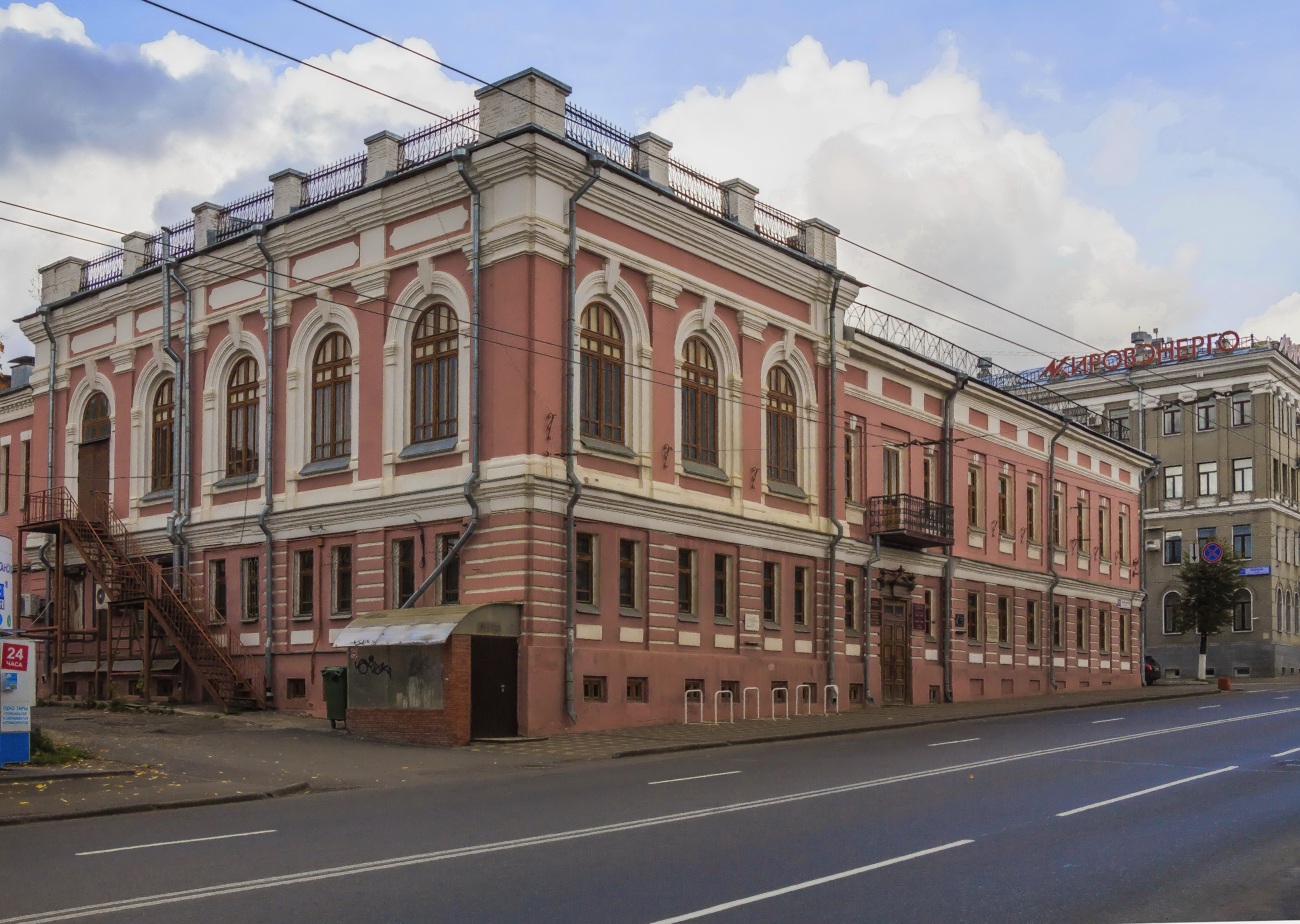
Arshaulov 's House

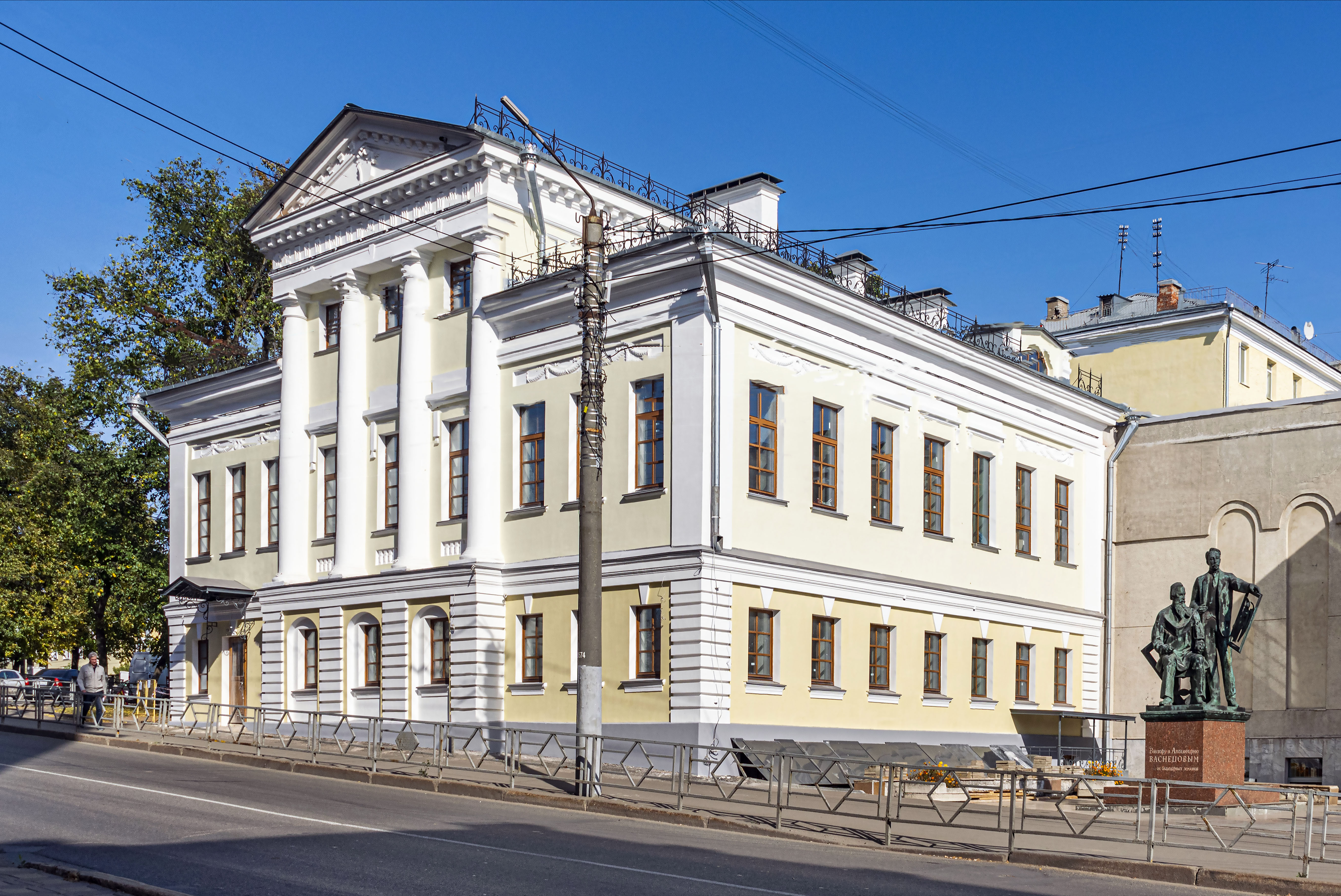
Repin 's Estate

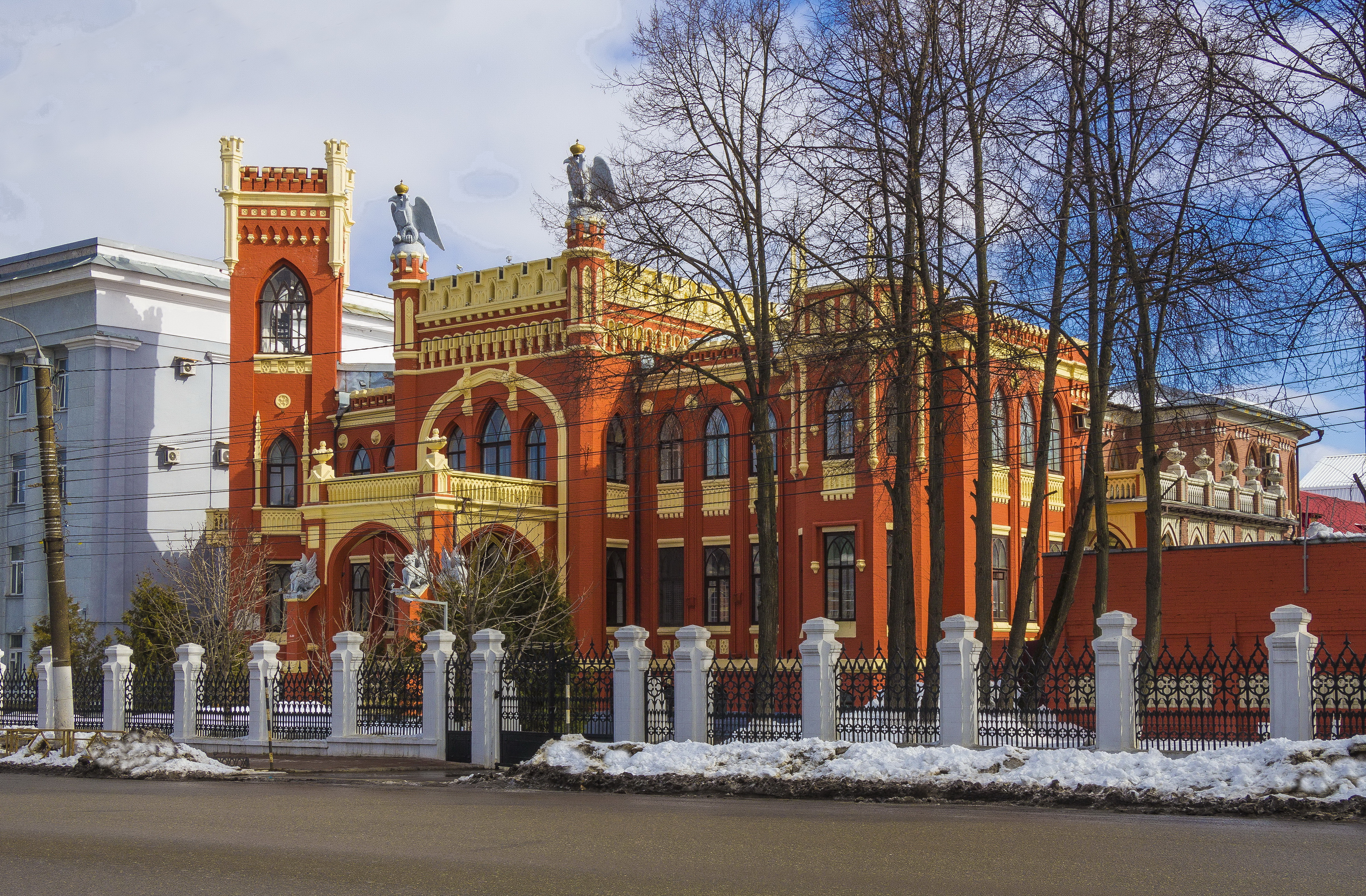
Bulychev 's Mansion

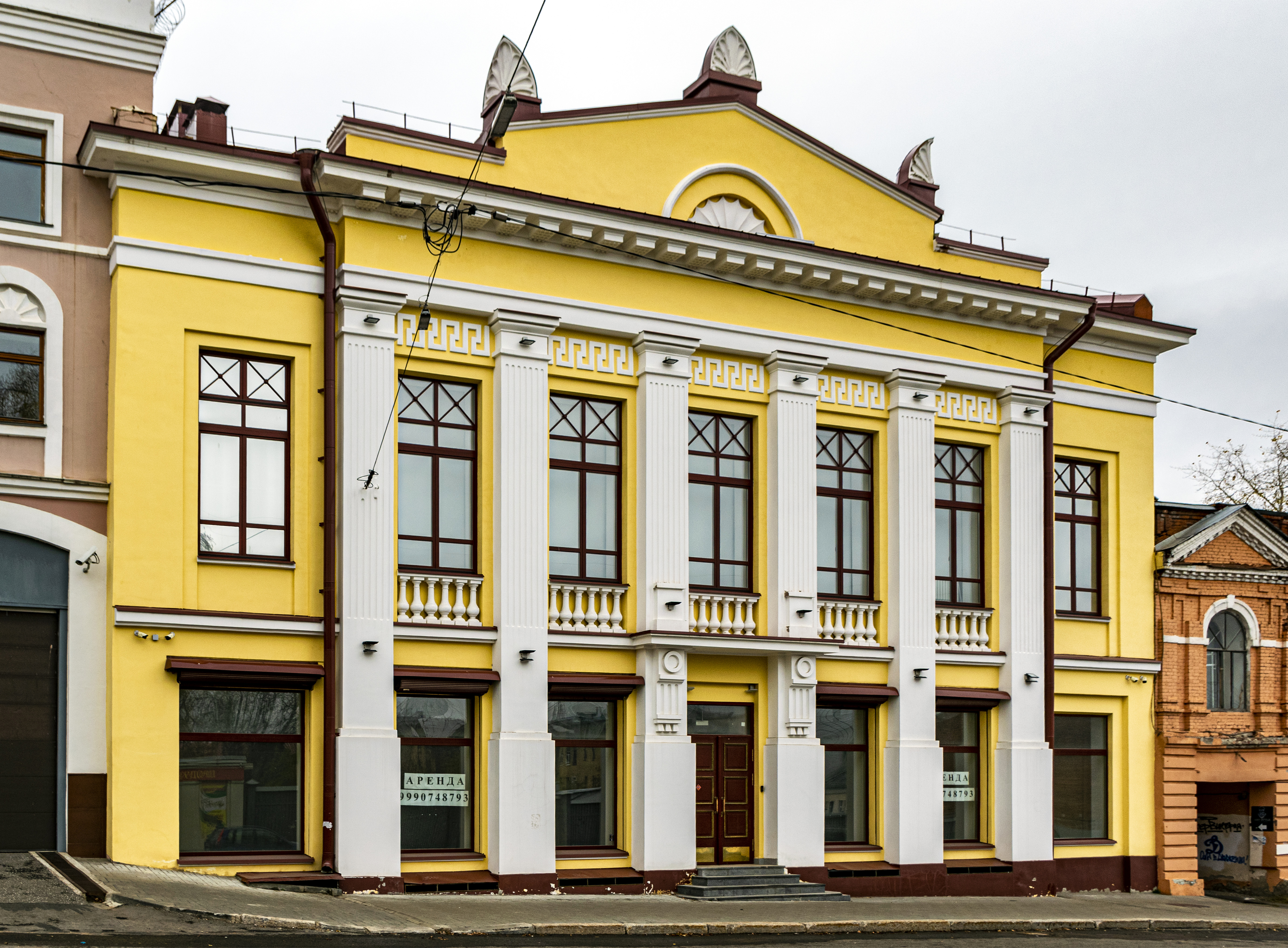
Veretennikov Bank Building

The list of temples in the city center, in addition to the above, includes: the Spaso-Preobrazhenskiy Convent (1696-1883), the Cathedral of Seraphim of Sarov (1904), the Church of John the Baptist (1717), the Chapel of the Archangel Michael (1866, restored in 1999), the Znamenskaya (Tsarevo-Konstantinovskaya) Church with a bell tower (1778, restored), Feodorovskaya Church (1913, in 2007 a new wooden one was built on the site of the destroyed church. In 2022, the wooden church burned down, the church is expected to be recreated according to the original project.), the Chapel of the Holy Prophet Elijah (2003), the Church in honor of the Icon of the Most Holy Theotokos "Vsekh skorbyashchikh radost" (lit. 'Joy of All Who Mourn') (2012), the Catholic Church of the Sacred Heart of Jesus (1903, services are held in the parish house). There are many more temples and chapels located throughout the city.

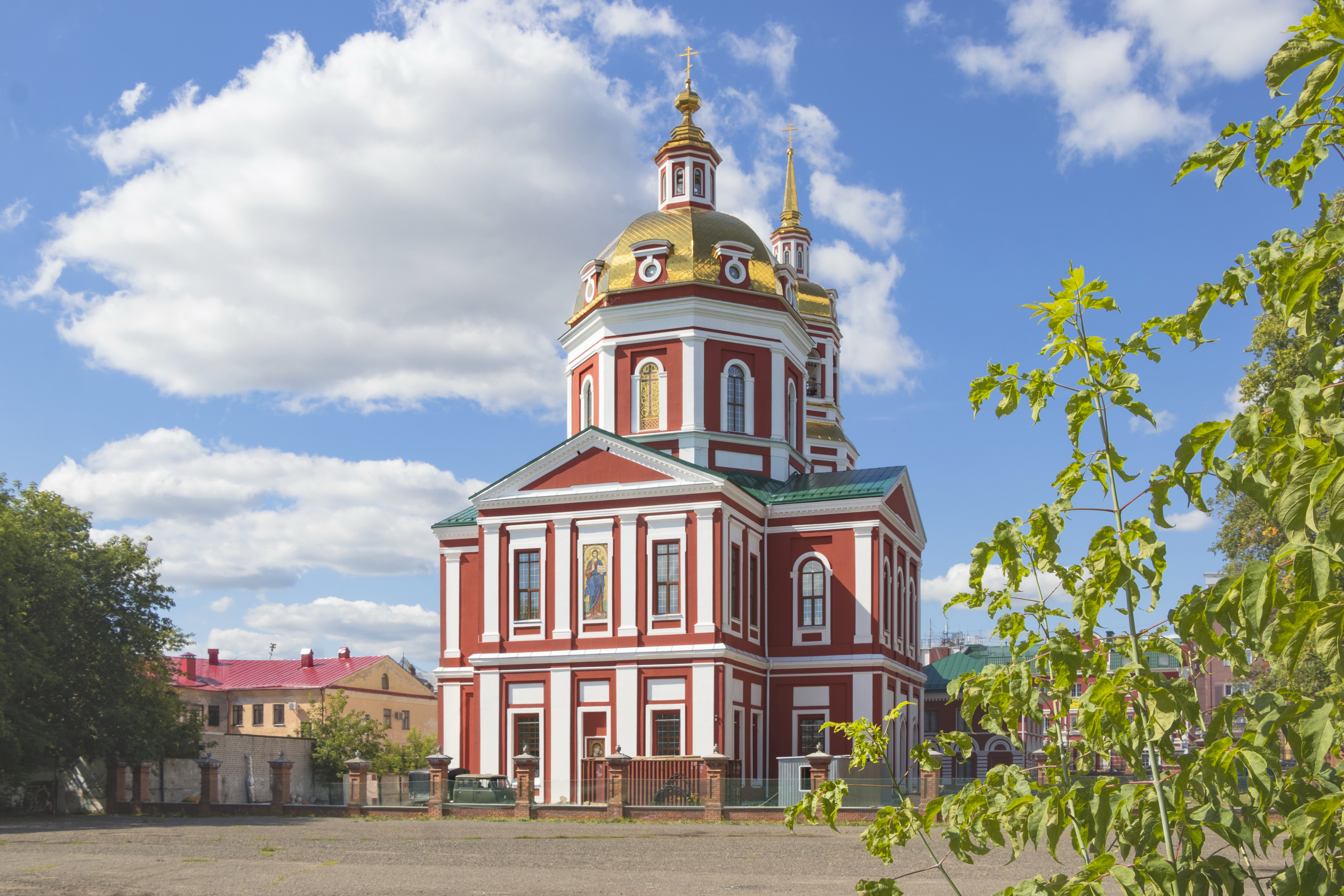
Spassky Cathedral

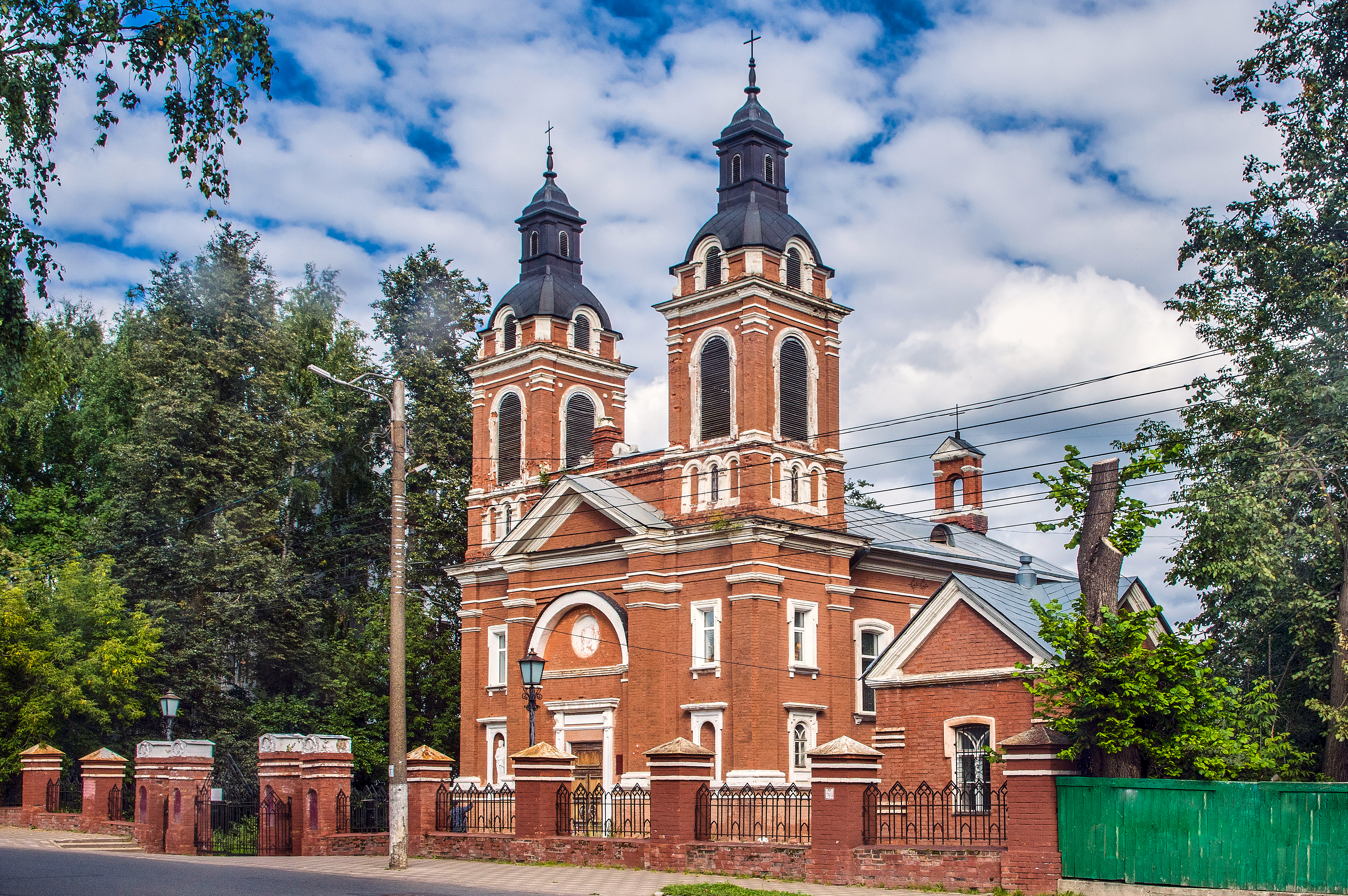
Catholic Church of the Sacred Heart of Jesus

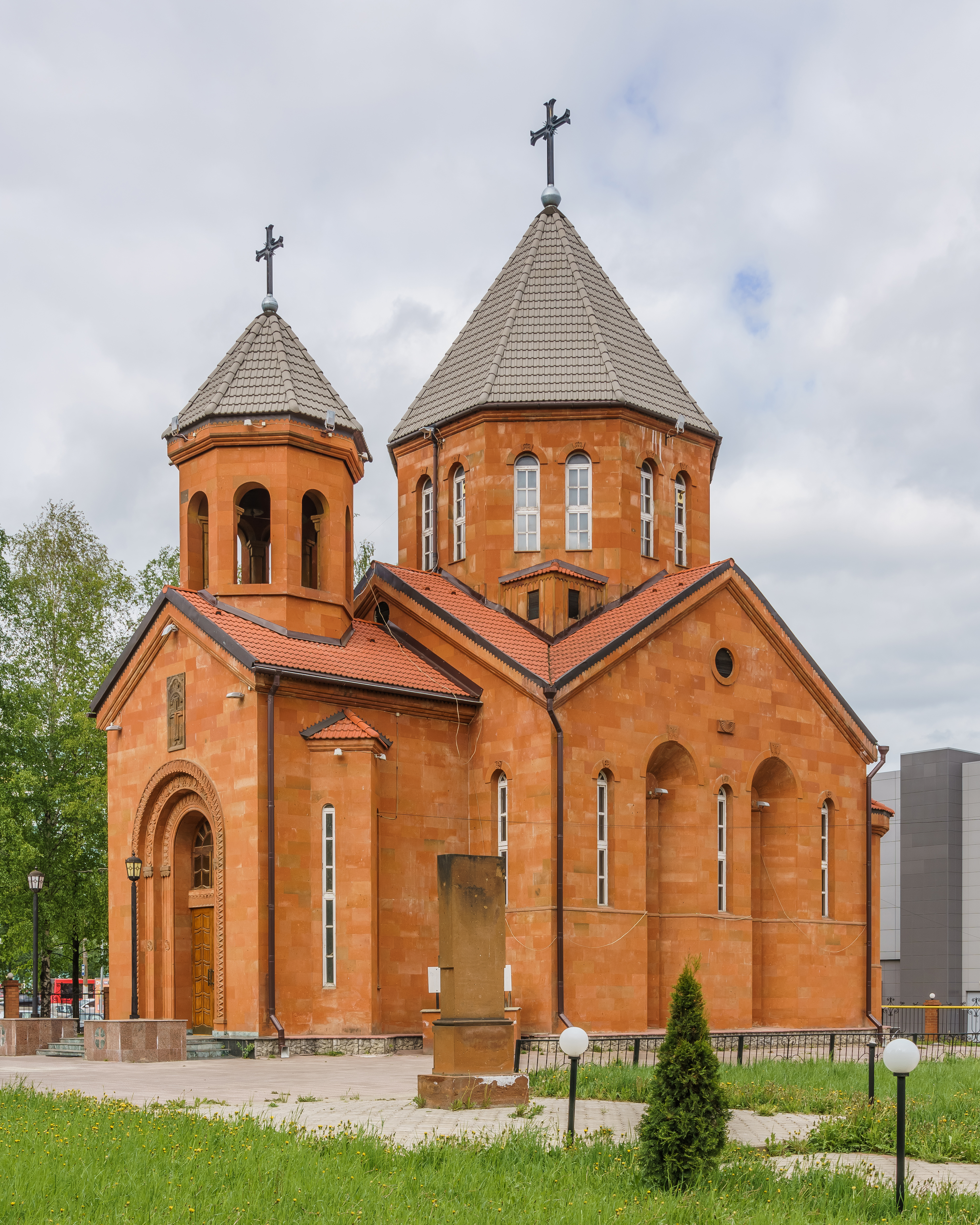
Armenian Church

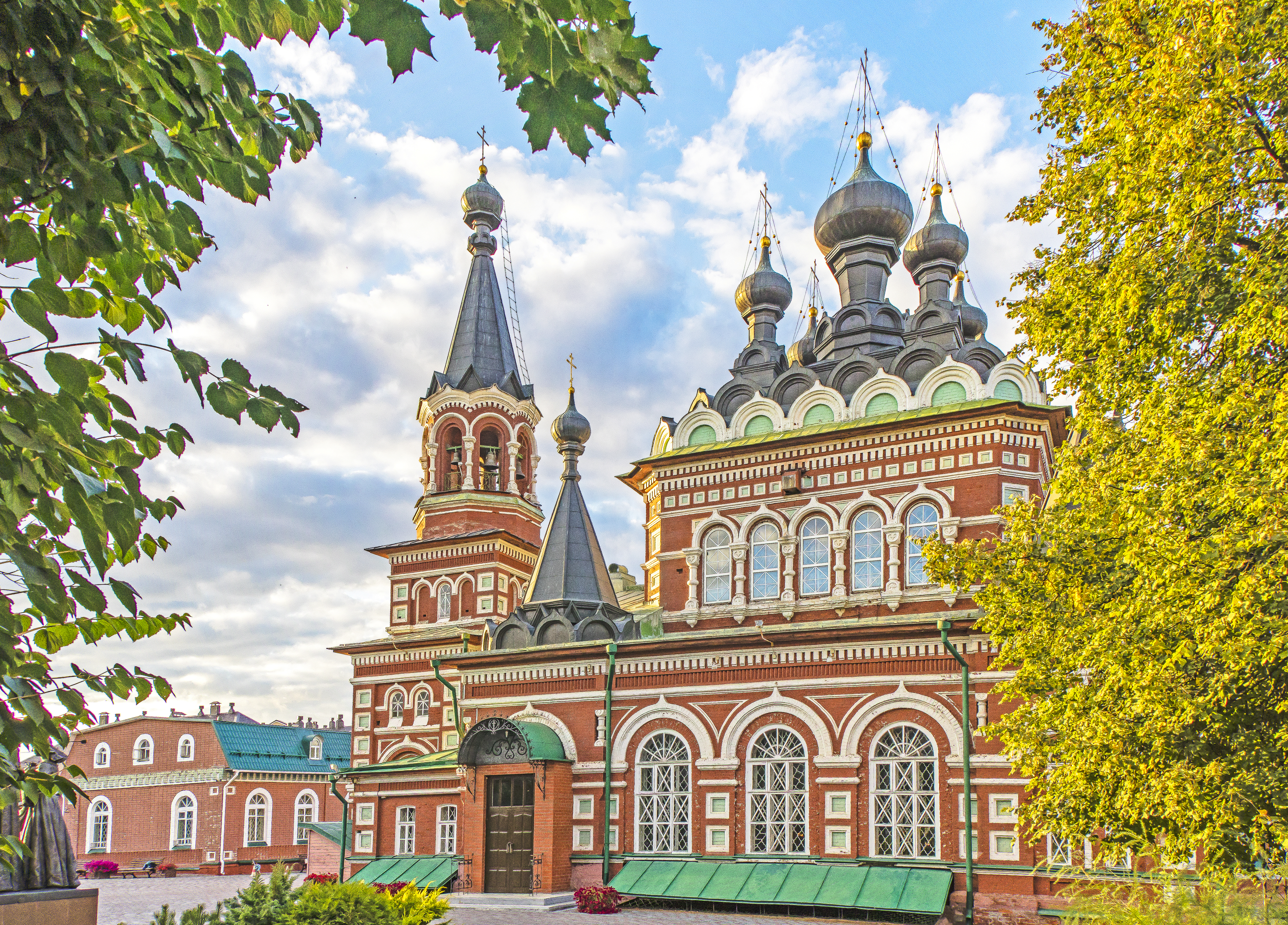
Cathedral of Seraphim of Sarov

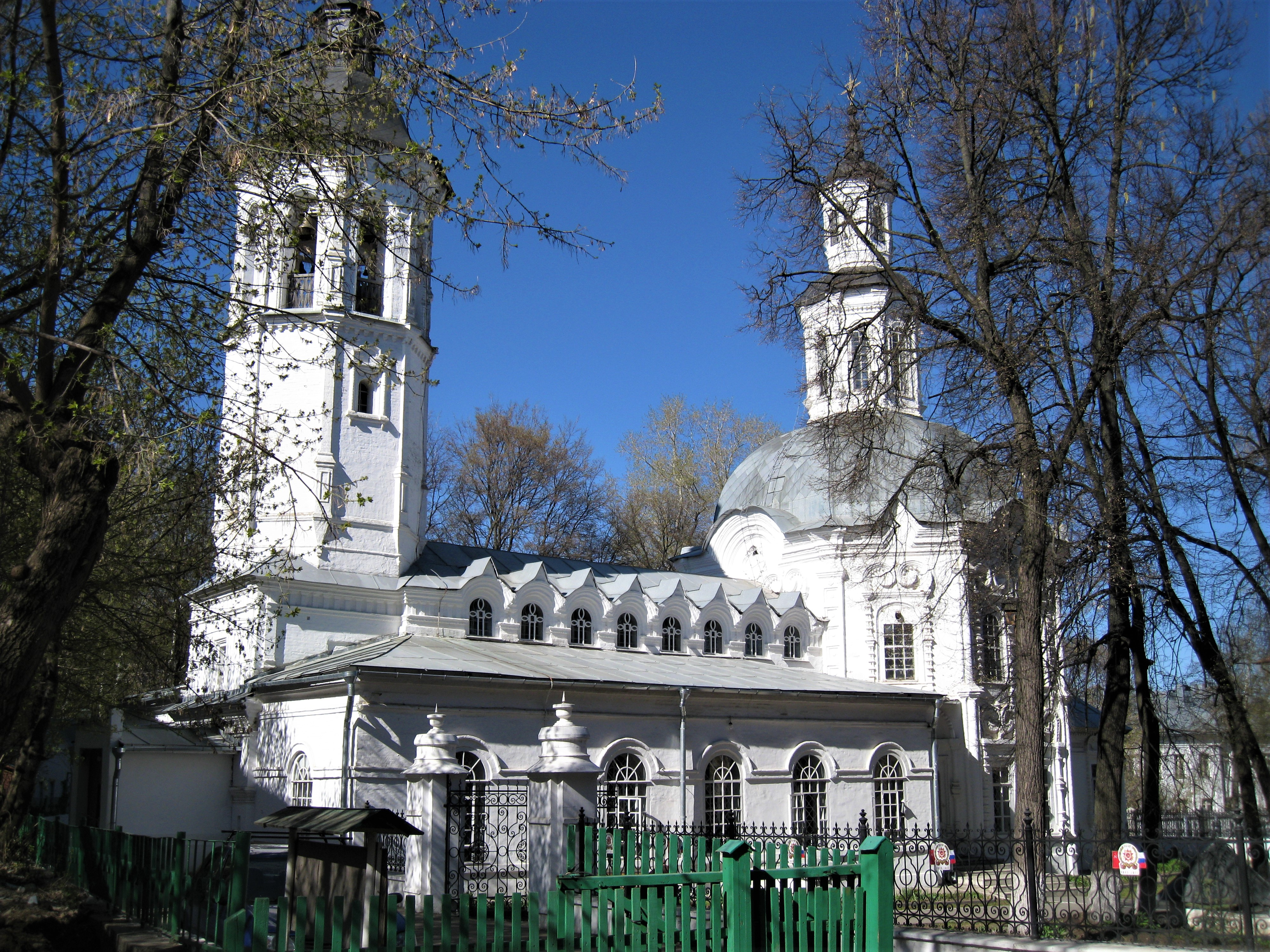
St. John the Baptist Church

A unique example of modern is the building of the Palace of Pioneers, created according to the original project. It is located in the middle of the park and is a structure with a stylized roof in the form of a red pioneer tie, waving upwards.

In the northern part of the city, in the Fileyka district, is a symbol of the Soviet era – a complex of ski jumps. The most important of them has a height of 90 meters, which, combined with the location on the top of the ravine, near the embankment, gives an impressive effect.

== Culture ==
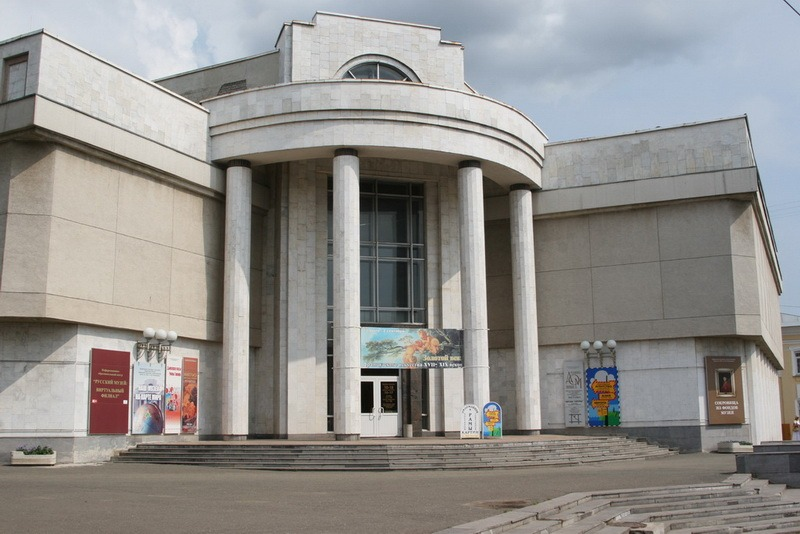
Vyatka Art Museum

Kirov is one of the most important cultural centers of the Volga-Vyatka region.

=== Museums ===
There are about 38 different museums in the city.

The Vyatka Vasnetsov Art Museum, one of the oldest art museums in Russia, was founded in 1910 by local artists. The idea of its creation belonged to the natives of Vyatka land Viktor and Apollinary Vasnetsov. The permanent exhibition consists of paintings by Ivan Aivazovsky, the Vasnetsov brothers, Ivan Shishkin, Vasily Surikov, Ilya Repin and other painters, as well as other works of culture, art and folklore of the Vyatka Region. The museum has several branches located in detached buildings and has over fifteen thousand exhibits.

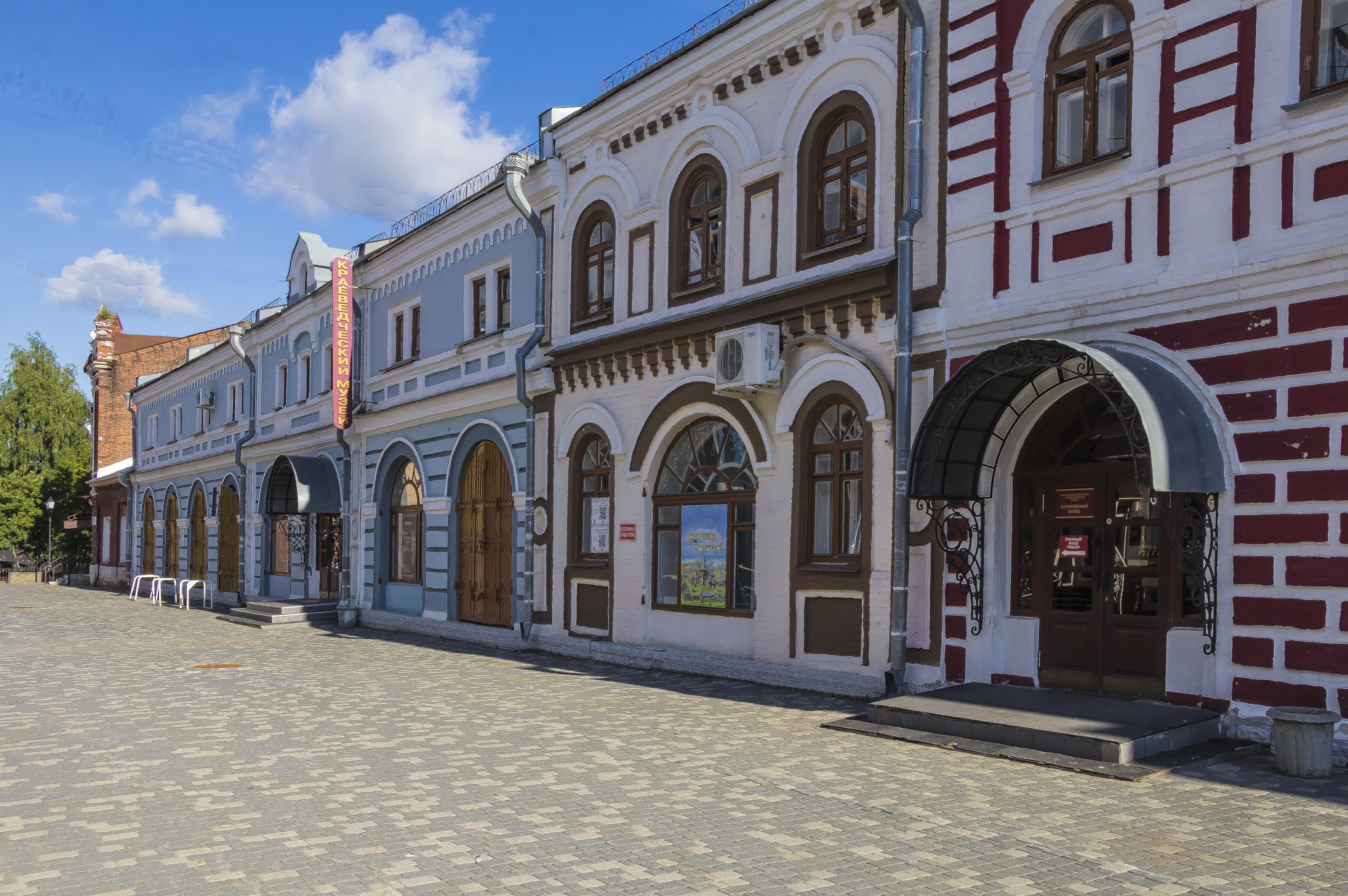
Museum of Local Lore

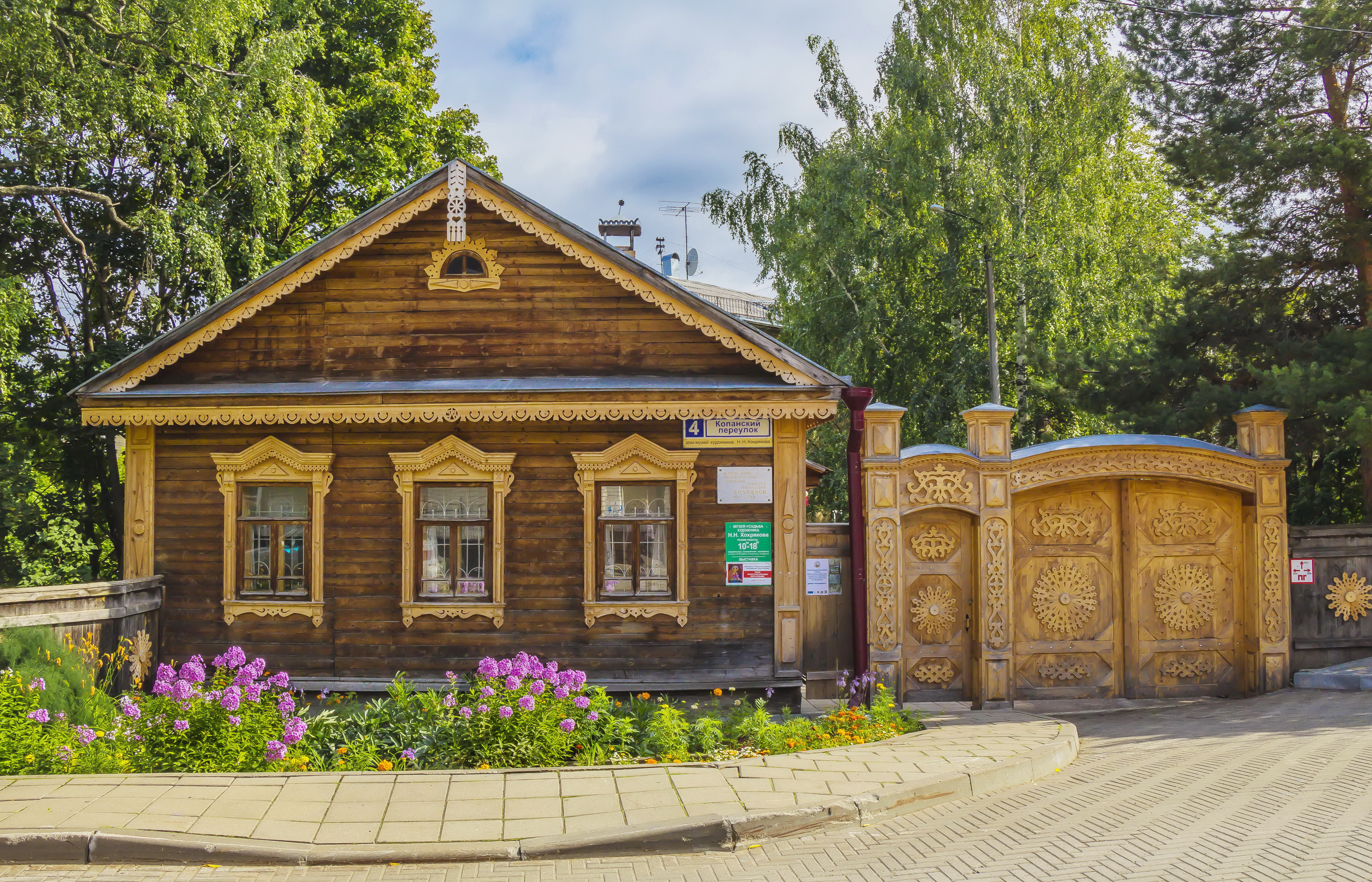
Museum-Estate of the Nikolay Khokhryakov

The materials of the Museum of Local Lore are devoted to the history and nature of the Vyatka Region, its flora and fauna. The museum also has a collection of rare minerals. Various exotic animals are presented separately. The department of the museum in the "Prikaznaya Izba" presents exhibits from the life of different segments of the population.

The exposition of the Paleontological Museum concerns the history of the development of life on Earth, many figures of historical beings are exhibited here.

The Museum of Tsiolkovsky, Aviation and Cosmonautics is located in a complex of two buildings, one of which is the former home of Tsiolkovsky. There are exhibits on space topics. Interactive halls "Space Exploration", "Manned cosmonautics" and "Astrophysical phenomena", "Virtual Cosmonautics" and a planetarium have been opened.

The Diorama Museum and Exhibition Center is located at the top of the cascade of ponds in Central Park. The main compositional center of the diorama canvas was the image of the revolutionary events of December 1917, which took place in Vyatka. The exposition tells about the pre-revolutionary Vyatka, about the life of merchants and the traditions of a provincial town.

A number of museums of the city are dedicated to famous people who lived in Vyatka. The House-Museum of the writer Mikhail Saltykov-Shchedrin, the Museum-Estate of the artist Nikolay Khokhryakov and the Museum of the writer Alexander Grin are located in historical buildings.

The Museum of Railway Transport and the Museum of the History of Public Education tell about the history of the development and formation of these spheres.

Museums of chocolate, lollipops, ice cream have been opened. The exposition of the Vyatka Samovar Museum tells about the history of artisanal and factory production of samovar, tea trade and tea drinking.

=== Theaters ===
The oldest theater in the city is the Kirov Drama Theater, founded in 1877. In the theater there are performances based on the best plays of Aristophanes, A.N. Ostrovsky, F.M. Dostoevsky, A.P. Chekhov, M.A. Bulgakov, on the prose of A.A. Platonov, I.A. Bunin. The repertoire is decorated with performances based on foreign classics – a play by Molière, prose by A. Dumas. Modern drama is represented by the names of Nikolai Kolyada, Oleg Bogaev, Dmitry Bogoslavsky, Yaroslava Pulinovich, Oleg Mikhailov, Yulia Tupikina. In addition, the theater holds screenings of sketches of performances based on plays by modern domestic and foreign playwrights in the format of a creative laboratory and a discussion club.

The repertoire of "Theater on Spasskaya" includes performances for children, youth and adults.

The Kirov Afanasyev Puppet Theater is one of the oldest puppet theaters in Russia, founded in 1935. The festival "Vyatka – the City of Childhood" is held with the support of the theater. As part of the festival, the Kirov audience could see performances from Italy, Armenia, as well as from other regions of Russia.

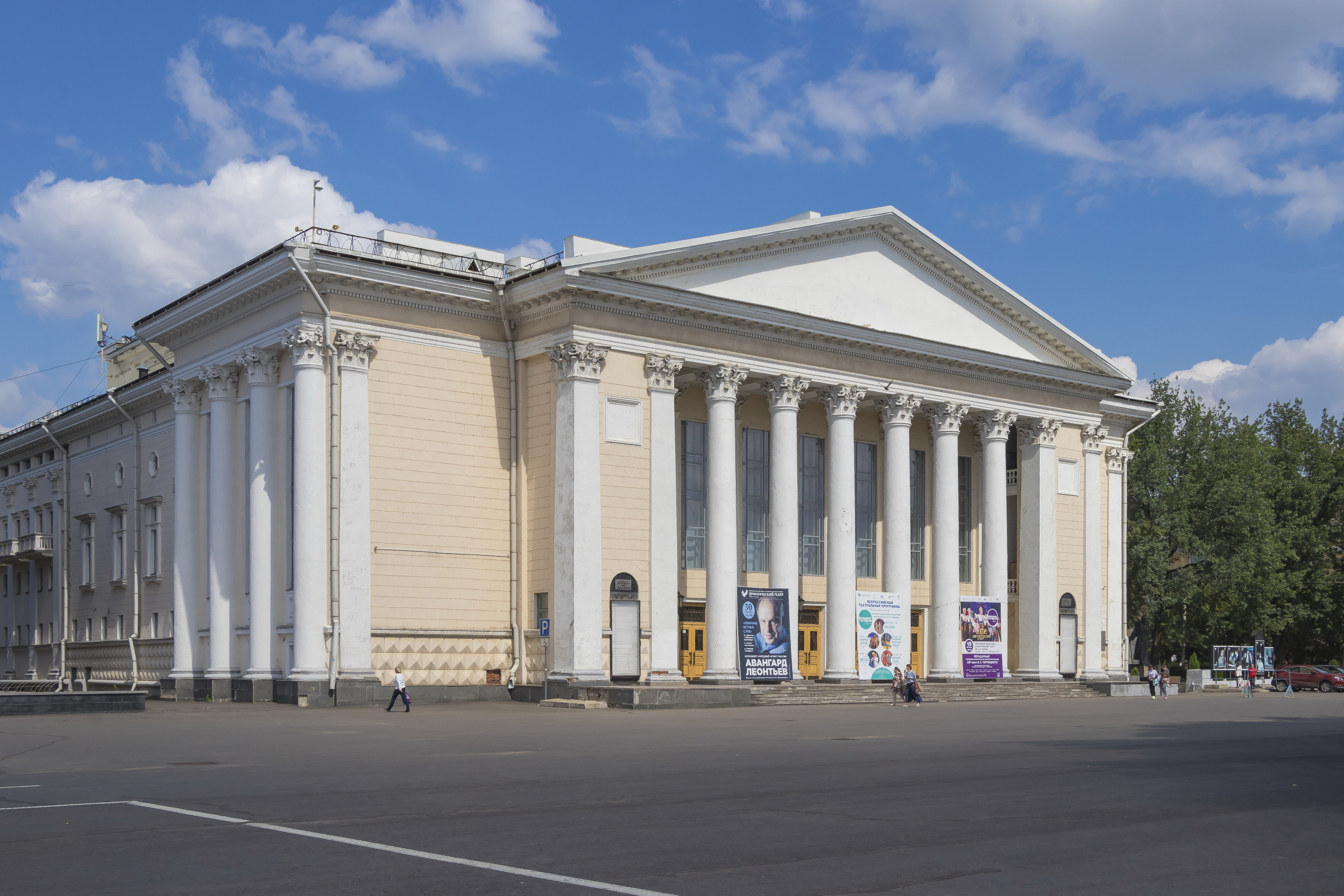
Drama Theater

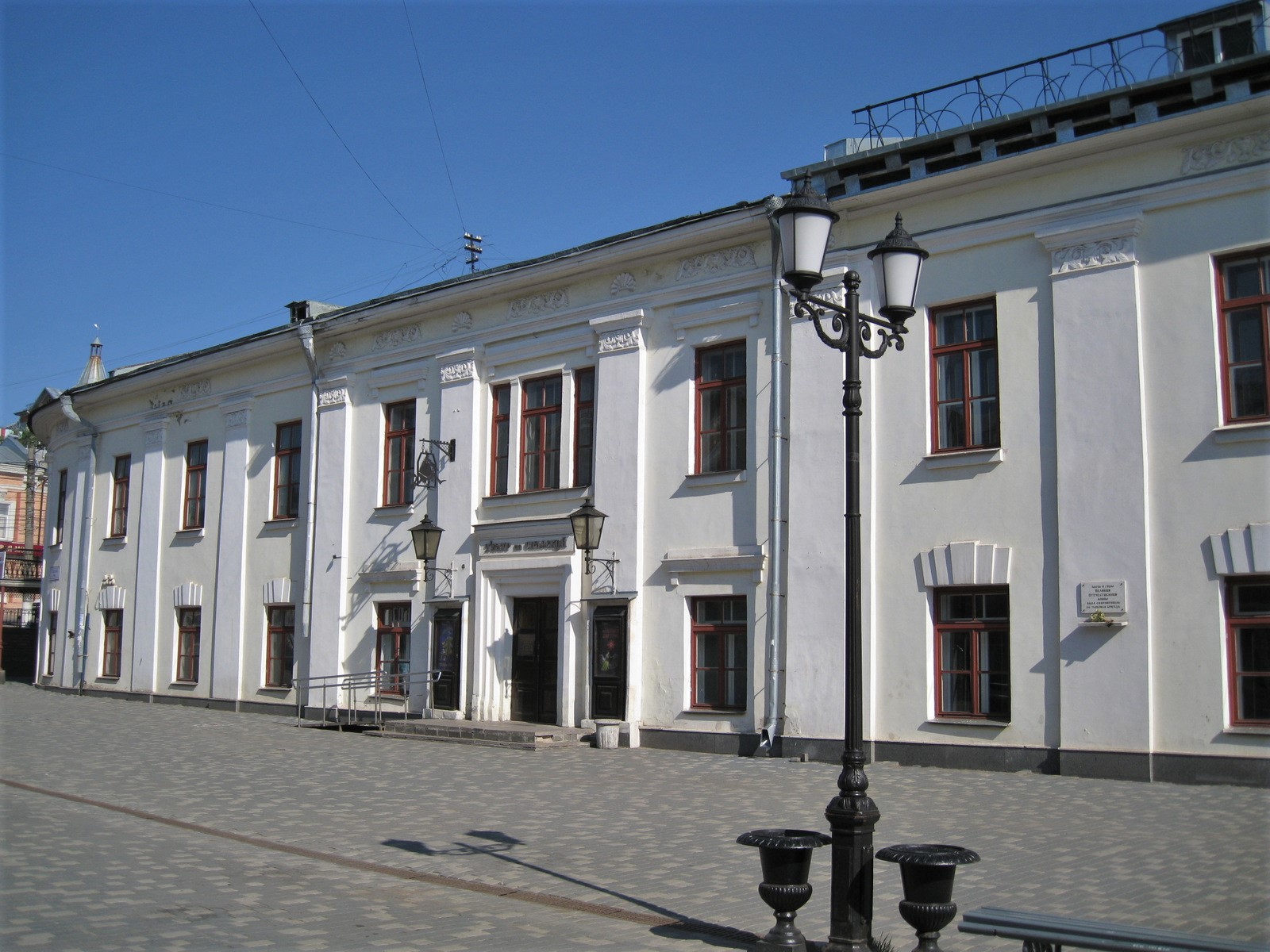
Theater on Spasskaya

=== Libraries ===
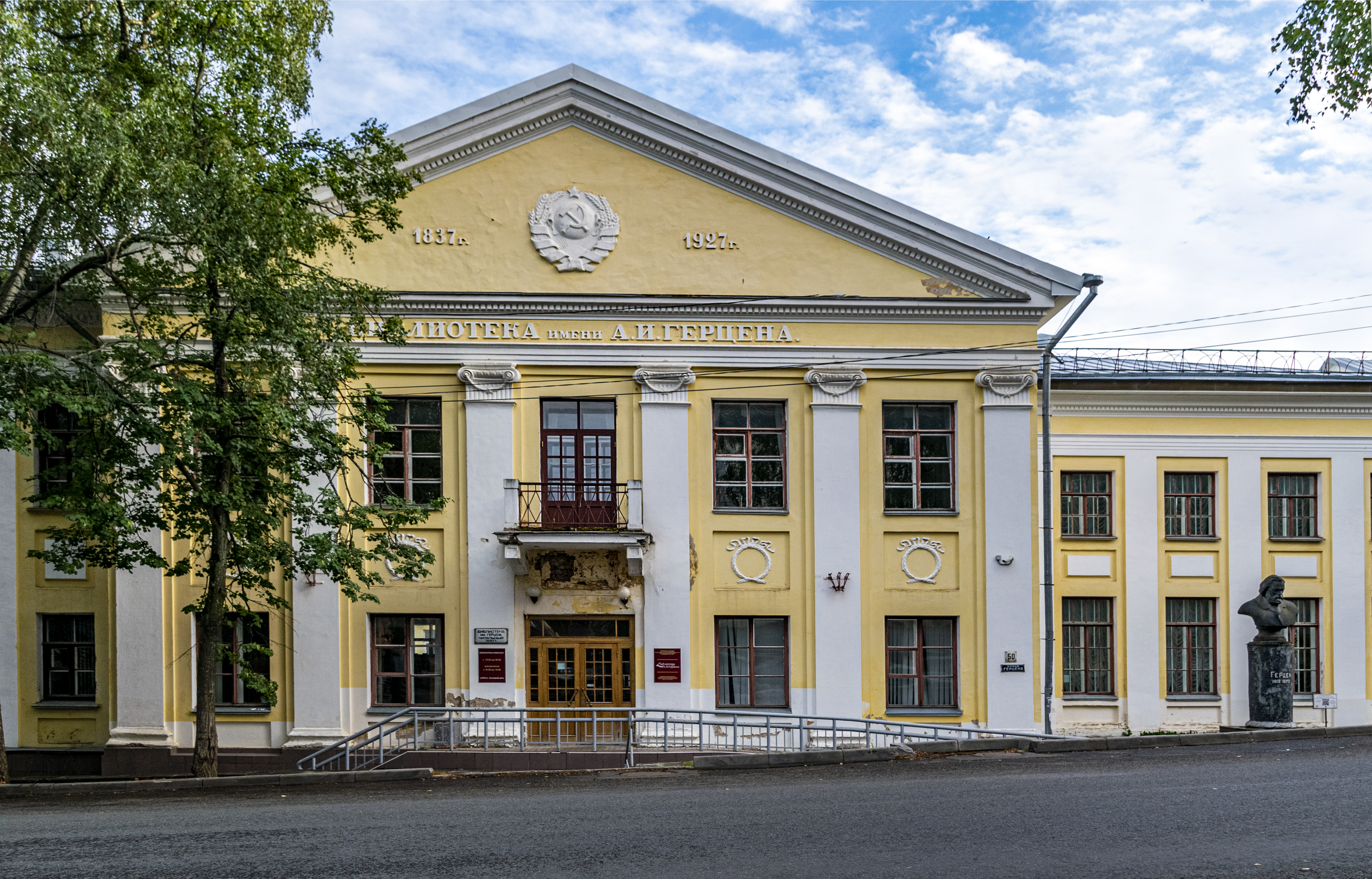
Herzen Library

There are about 28 libraries in the city. The central library of the region is the Herzen Library, one of the largest and oldest libraries in Russia. One of the largest collections of children's and youth literature has the Grin Library and the Kirov Youth Library.

=== Circus ===
Kirov State Circus is located on the territory of the Central Park of the city, was founded in 1977. The circus is equipped with modern equipment and can host any program: circus on ice, circus on water. The circus has a stable, aviaries for animals, and a hotel for artists is located next to the circus building.

=== Events ===
- The International festival "Fabulous Games on Vyatka" has been held since 2012. The festival includes a parade of fairytale heroes from different countries, contests, concert programs, master classes, as well as events to help children with disabilities and those in a difficult life situation.
- The art festival "Days of Romance on Vyatka" has been held since 2015. Within the framework of the festival — various events for art lovers, taking place during the week at the sites of cultural institutions of the city (libraries, museums, recreation centers). An obligatory component of the festival is the presentation of the Award of the Governor of the Kirov Region in the nomination "Alexander Grin Award".
- The international festival "Vyatka – the city of childhood" gathers the best theatrical performances staged by directors of different schools and directions. Representatives of Russian regions and foreign countries come to the festival every year.
- The Festival of Symphony Orchestras of Russia "Symphony over Vyatka" presents to lovers of musical art the work of the leading symphony orchestras of Russia, as well as one of the best ensembles of the Vyatka region — the Vyatka Symphony Orchestra named after V. A. Rayevsky.

=== Parks and squares ===
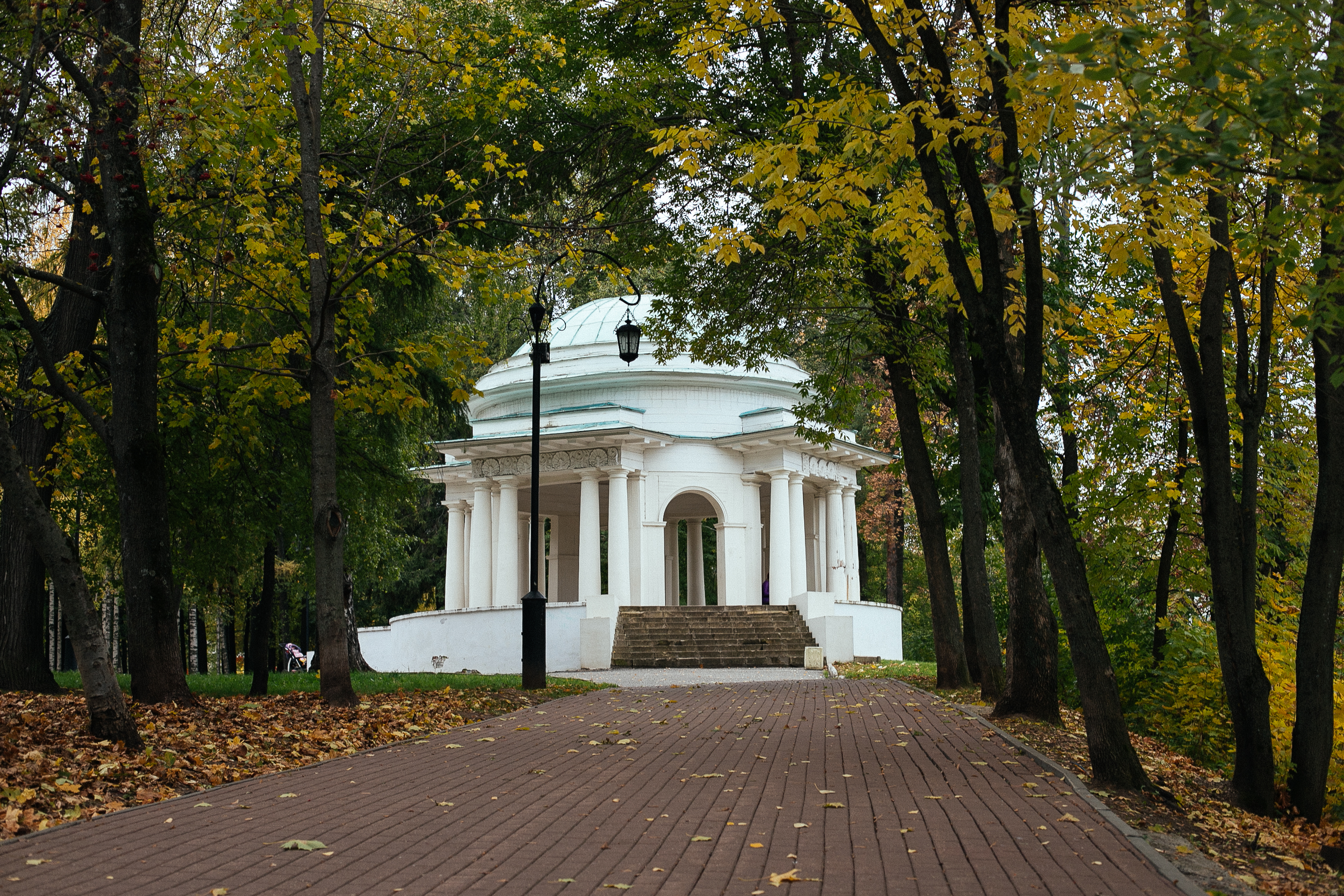
Rotunda of the Alexander Garden

- Alexander Garden. The oldest park in the city. It is named after Emperor Alexander I, who visited Vyatka during his reign. The garden offers views of the Vyatka River. The hallmark of the garden is the white rotundas located on the edge of the ravine.

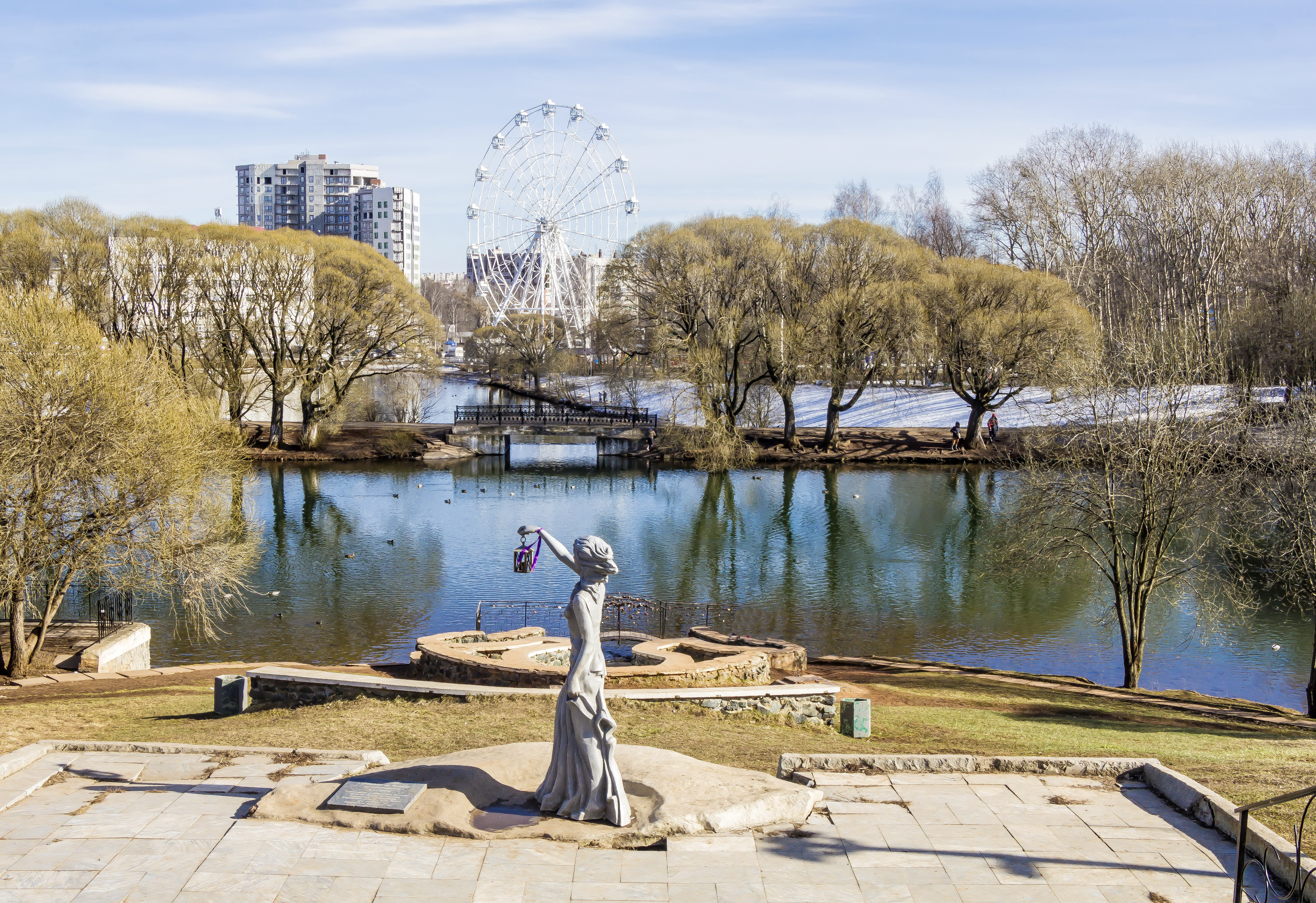
Cascade of ponds in Central Park

- Kirov Park (Central Park). The Central Park of the city, one of the favorite vacation spots of Kirov residents.
  It occupies a huge territory, a whole block in the middle of the city. Here is the Kirov Circus, a complex of attractions, including the Ferris ring, sports facilities.
  The main distinguishing feature of the park is an artificially created cascade of ponds, above which rises a Diorama – the building of the historical museum.
- Gagarin Park is located in the city center on the site of the former Vyatka Alexander Nevsky Cathedral. After the demolition of the temple, the building of the Vyatka Philharmonic, the central art and concert institution of the city, was built in its place. A park named after Yuri Gagarin was laid out on the territory surrounding the Philharmonic Hall.

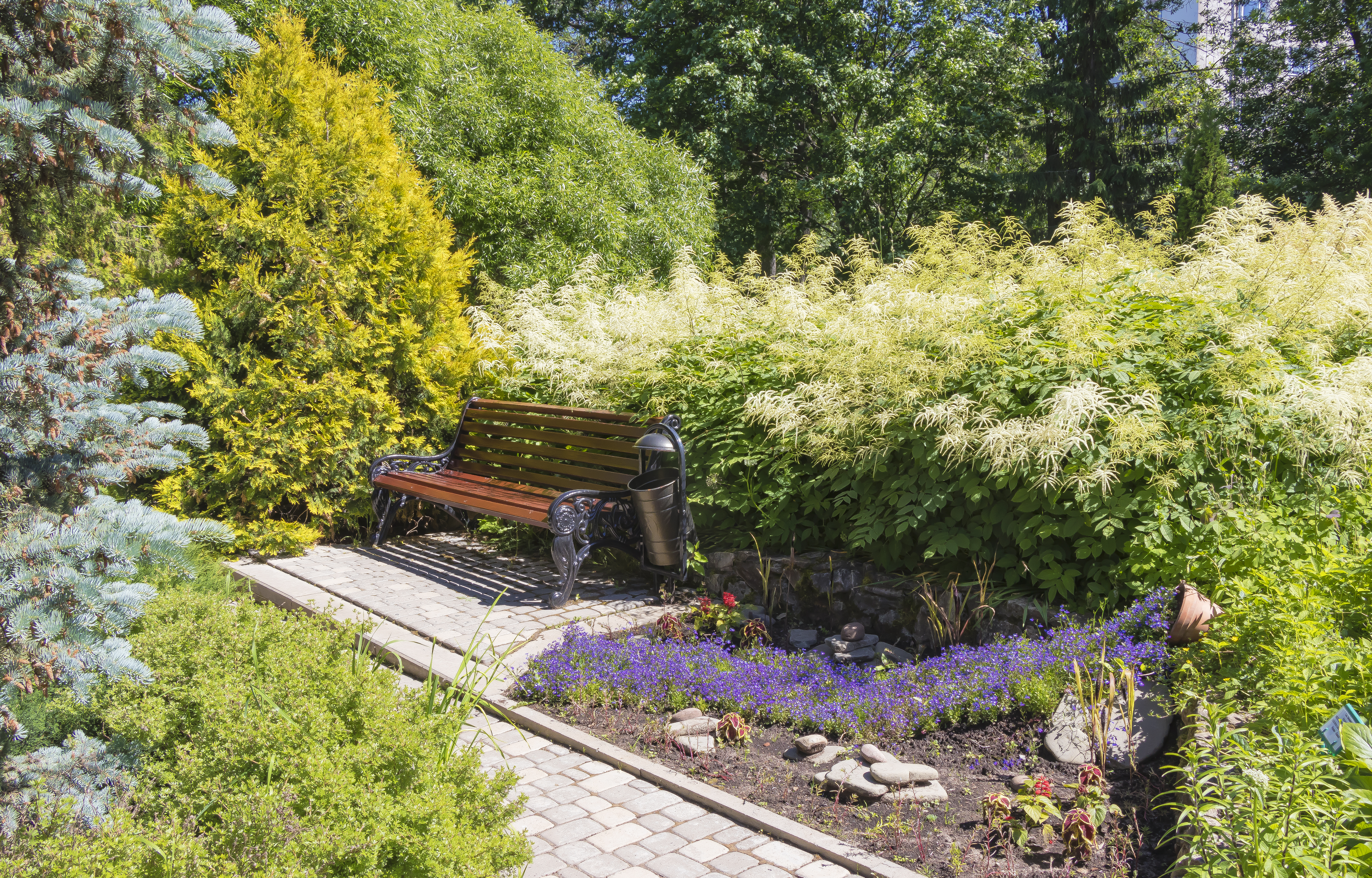
Botanical Garden

- Alexander Grin Square is located in the lowlands of one of the parts of the Blockage ravine that runs through the entire historical central part of the city. Due to the location of the square, well-used landscape differences are distinguished, in the depths of which a large fountain is located. The design of the square is dedicated to the romantic theme of the works of Alexander Grin.

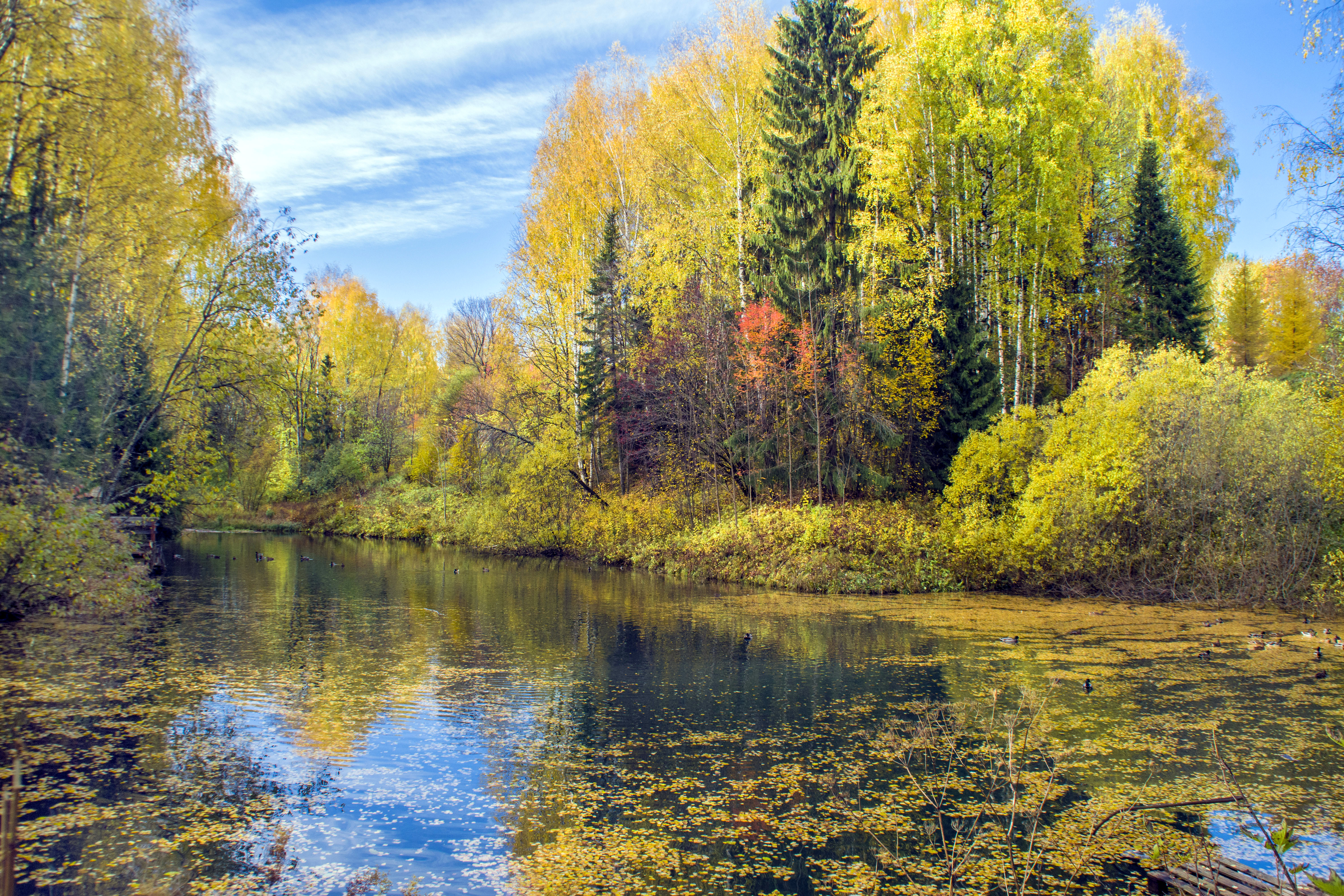
Arboretum

- Vyatka University Botanical Garden.
  It is also located in the bottom of a ravine. The history of the garden has more than 100 years. Here students and teachers of Vyatka University gather a variety of expositions, including those dedicated to the Caucasus, the Far East and North America.
- Victory Park. On the site of the current territory of the park was the village, many residents of which gave their lives on the battlefields during the Second World War. In memory of the feat of the villagers in its place, it was proposed to set up a park. The idea was realized in 1970, when alleys appeared, a memorial stele was erected, under which the eternal flame was lit. In 2010, a memorial sign was erected in honor of the heroes of the village on which his names were immortalized, a bas-relief dedicated to G. P. Bulatov, a native of the Kirov region, who was one of the first to plant the Soviet flag over the Reichstag in May 1945, was installed next to them. In 2015, a memorial alley was built in the park, at the beginning of which four busts of marshals of Russia were installed: Sokolov, Govorov, Vershinin and Konev.
- Arboretum. A large forest park away from the main part of the city, with an area of about 500 thousand square meters. On the territory of the arboretum there are trees and shrubs from different parts of the world: from the Far East, North America, the Caucasus, Central Asia, Japan. In total, there are about 180 species of higher plants. The animal world is represented by 440 species of animals. Paths and bridges have been laid throughout the park, gazebos and benches have been put up.
- Zarechny Park is located on the right bank of the Vyatka River, opposite the historical center and framed by the currents of the river.
- Kochurovsky Park. The park in western residential district is located behind the Marshall Konev Square and the farmer's market.
- 50th anniversary of the Komsomol Park (the territory of the "Palace of Pioneers"). It stands out as a unique monument of Soviet modernism with a pyramidal red roof in the form of a pioneer tie. The author's entrance group and architectural objects emphasize this style. Next to the palace there is a memorial complex dedicated to the heroism of Kirov residents on the battlefields of the Civil and Great Patriotic War.

== Vyatka crafts ==
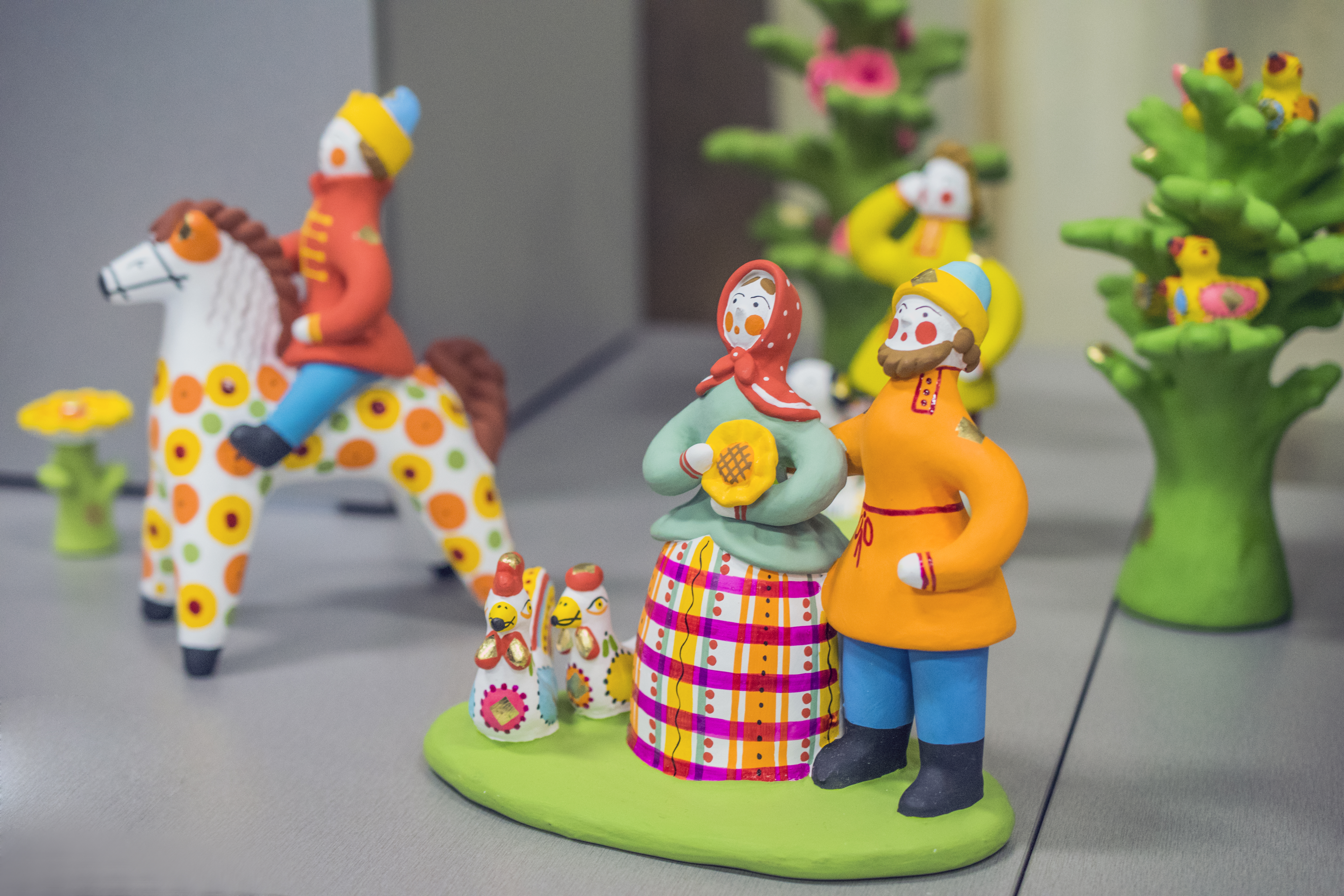
Dymkovo toy

The hallmark of the city is various folk crafts.

One of the main crafts is the Dymkovo toy. It originated in the settlement of Dymkovo, now within the city limits of Kirov. Each toy is unique, one master works with it from beginning to end. It is characterized by the simplicity of patterns and brightness of the palette. Dymkovo outfits are reflected in the collections of modern fashion designers. The motifs of the Dymkovo ornament were used at the opening ceremony of the 2014 Winter Olympic Games in Sochi.

Burr-wood carving, according to one version, came to Vyatka in the XVIII century. Burr wood products are distinguished by their uniqueness and are valued for their beauty and rarity.

== Education ==
Currently, there are 13 state universities and their branches operating in the city, in which more than several tens of thousands of students study in total. In addition, there are 11 non—state universities and their branches in the city, as well as one church – Vyatka Theological School.

Kirov is the home of Vyatka State University, which was established in 1914. As of 2022, 18 thousand students were studying at the university. The University ranked 39th in the National Ranking of Universities in the "Education" parameter, 44th among Russian universities according to the global ranking of scientific institutions SCImago Institutions Rankings-2021.

Kirov State Medical University is the largest scientific, educational and medical complex of the Kirov region and the Volga Region. The university annually attracts many students from various regions of Russia and other countries. The university has opened an Anatomical Museum, which presents more than 1,000 exhibits. According to the results of monitoring the quality of educational activities of universities conducted by the Ministry of Education and Science of the Russian Federation, the university entered the Top 10 best universities in the country, taking a place on the first lines of the rating. The medical University has established well-known scientific schools in the country: rheumatology (Professor B. F. Nemtsov), surgery (Professors V. A. Zhuravlev and V. A. Bakhtin), pediatrics (Professor Ya. Yu. Illek), obstetrics and gynecology (Professor S. A. Dvoryansky), social medicine, medical ecology and hygiene (Professor B. A. Petrov), neurology and neurosurgery (Professor B. N. Bein).

Volga-Vyatka Branch of the Moscow State Law University – is one of the best specialized law universities in the Volga region. Currently, the Institute has more than 1,600 students. During the existence of the Institute, more than ten thousand lawyers with higher education have been trained to work in courts, prosecutor's offices, the Ministry of Internal Affairs, the FSB, state and municipal authorities, notaries, lawyers, legal services of enterprises, organizations and institutions. The Institute has opened a specialized forensic laboratory, a department of labor law Teachers provide advisory assistance to local authorities in their law-making and law enforcement work. The Institute has a student law clinic – a center for free legal aid for socially vulnerable segments of the population.

There is also an Vyatka Agrotechnological university in Kirov, the first mention of which dates back to 1872.

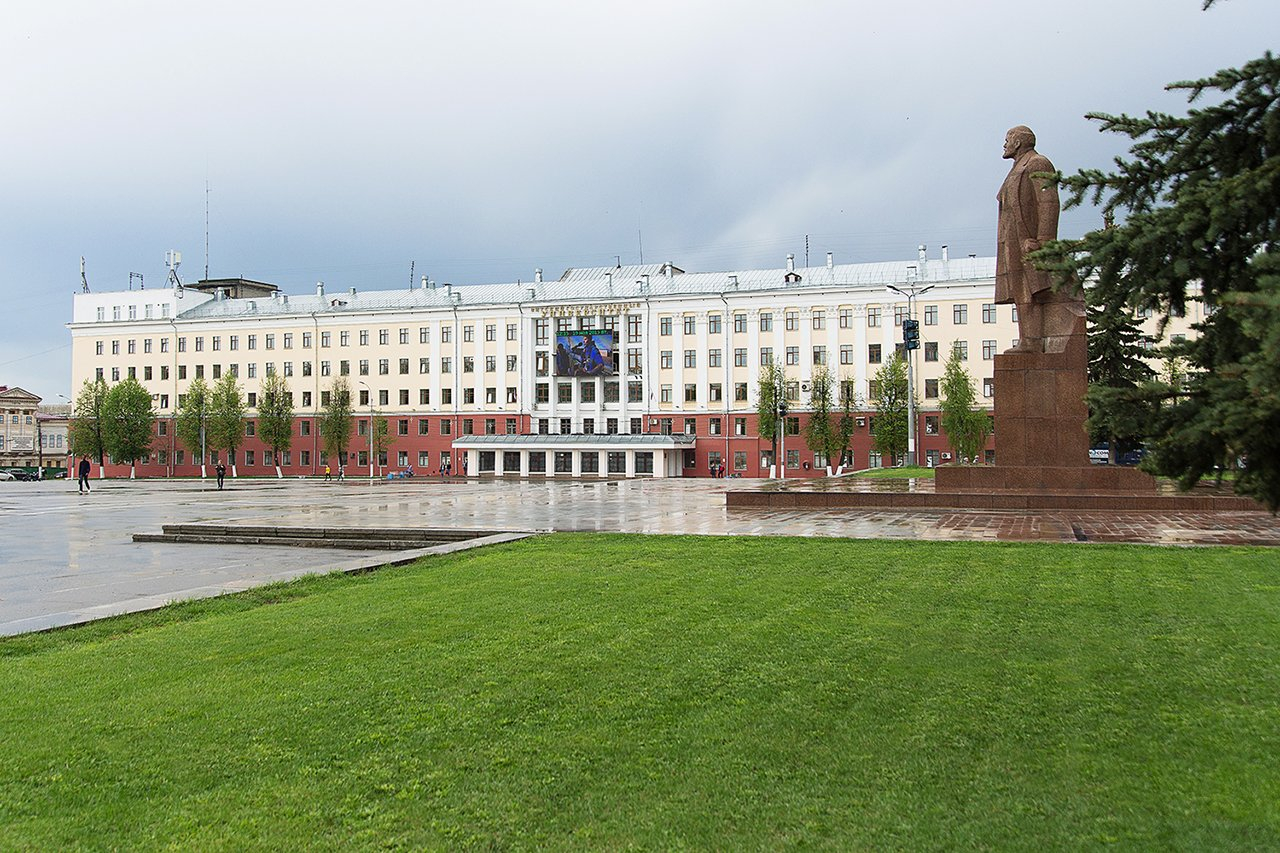
Vyatka State University

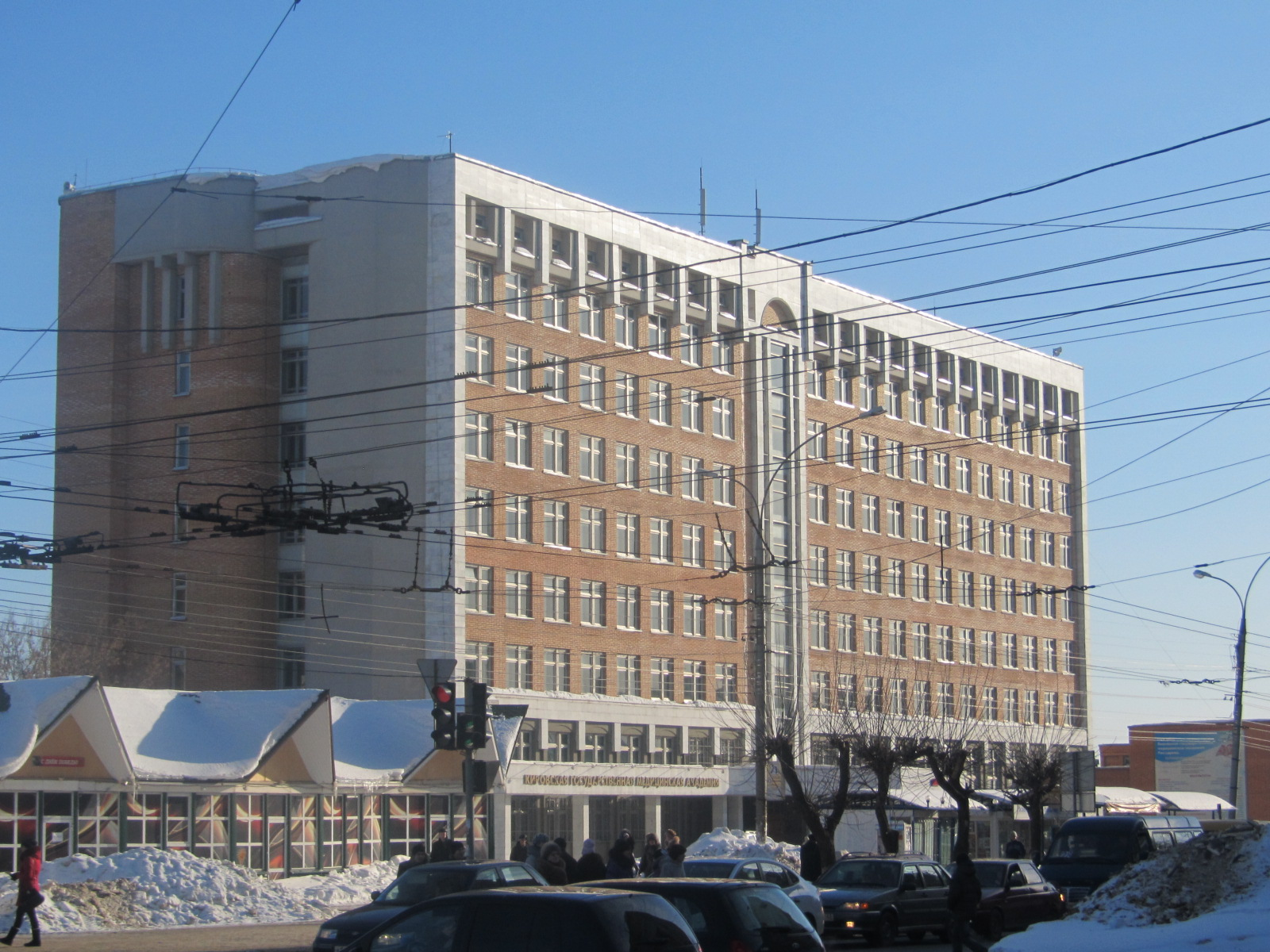
Kirov State Medical University

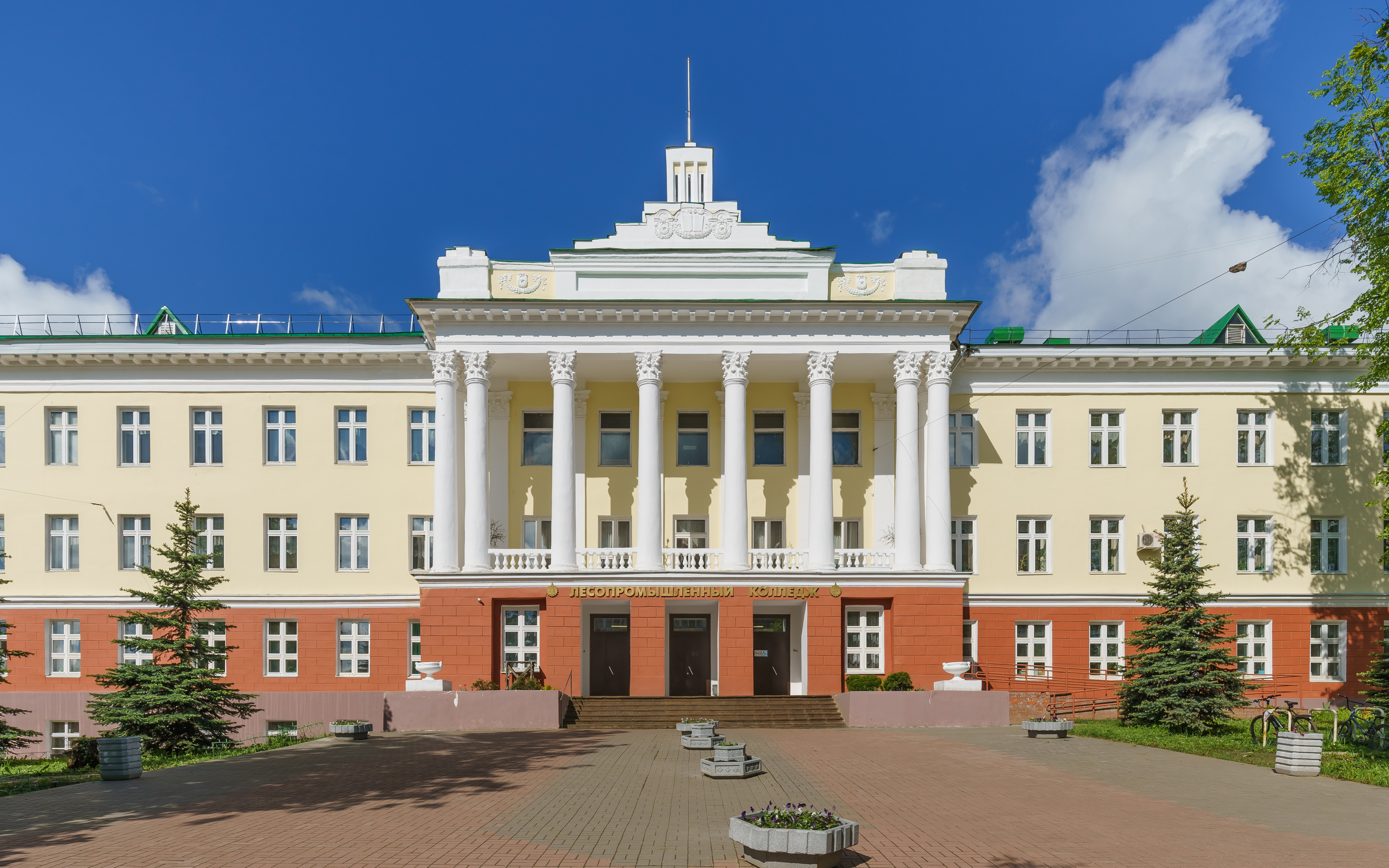
Kirov Forestry and Industrial College

== Transport ==
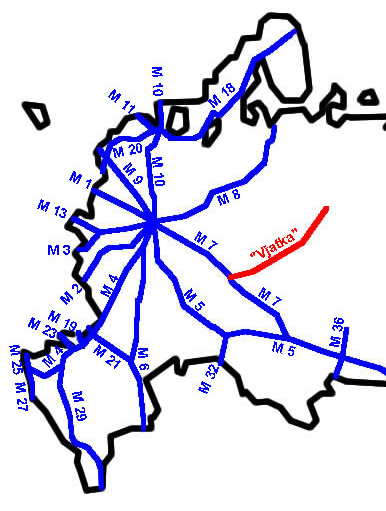
P176 «Vyatka» in the system of federal roads of Russia

Kirov is a major transport hub. Near the city there is the federal highway "Vyatka", connected to the Kirov entrance, as well as the federal highway P243 Kostroma — Sharya — Kirov — Perm. There is an exit to Arkhangelsk, Veliky Ustyug and Vologda along the A123 federal highway, adjacent to Vyatka, 340 kilometers from Kirov.

The regional highway P159 connects Kirov with Nizhny Novgorod.

Kirov is a major railway junction of the Trans-Siberian Railway. Through the city there are railway tracks going to Nizhny Novgorod, Moscow, Vologda, Kotlas, St. Petersburg, Perm.

=== Public transport ===
Kirov's public transport is represented by buses and trolleybuses

Every day, more than 499 units of public transport rolling stock, including 87 trolleybuses, enter the municipal routes of the city of Kirov. On urban routes, an average of about 292.4 thousand trips are made daily, with a mobility coefficient of 1.7 trips per day on public transport, this corresponds to 172 thousand people or about 30% of the city's population.

According to satellite monitoring data for 2019, 1,879,047 flights were performed by public transport, 1,867,138.91 car hours were worked on urban routes, 94,407,930 passengers were transported.

=== Rail ===
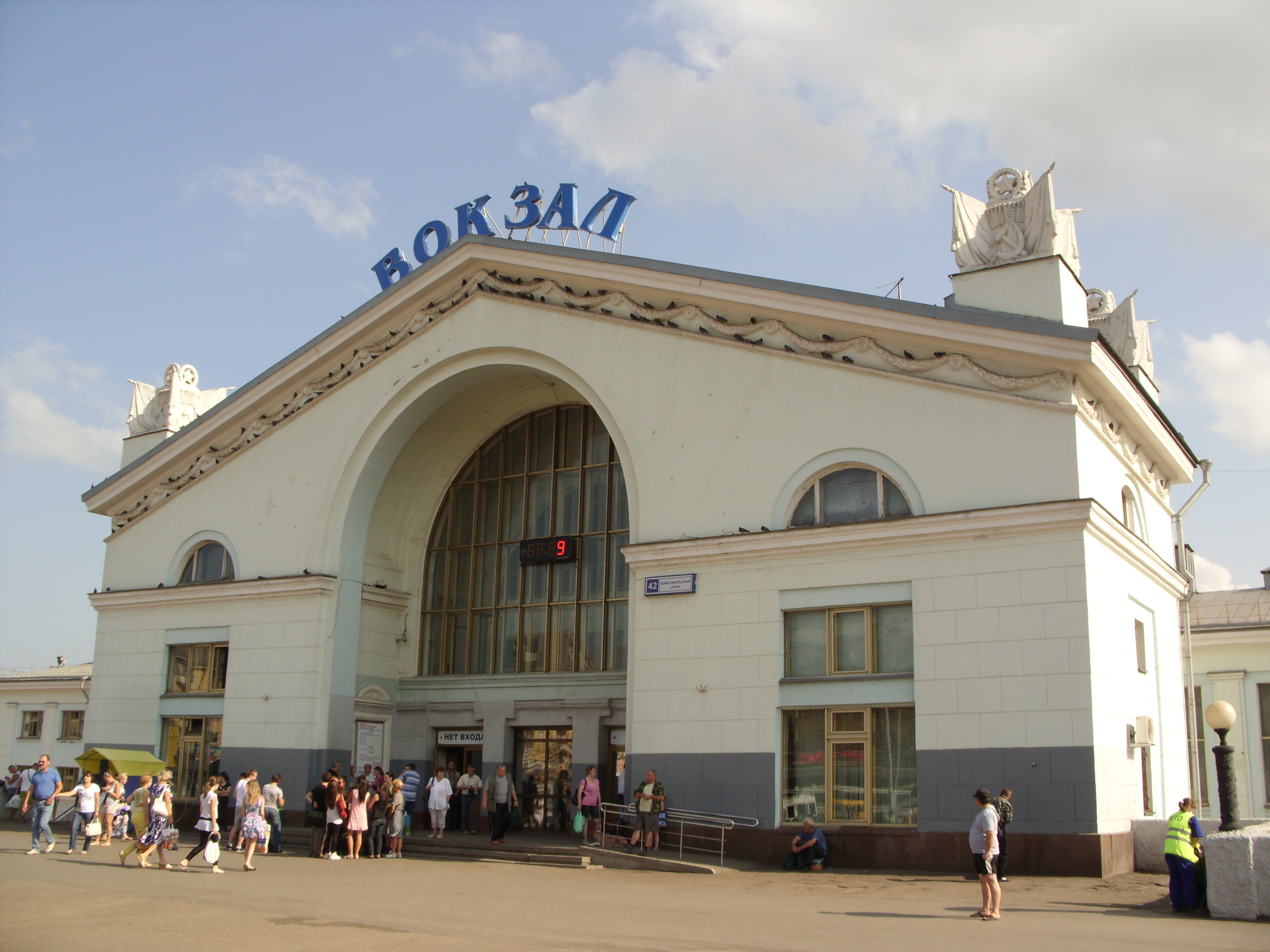
Kirov railway station, view from the facade

Kirov is a major railway junction. There are eight railway stations in the city.

There are three stations with stations, the largest of which is the Kirov Railway Station, built in 1902. It serves passenger trains running on the Trans-Siberian Railway, as well as suburban trains.

=== Air ===
There is an Pobedilovo airport in Kirov, 22 km from the city territory.

The airport has three runways with a length of 600, 685 and 2700 meters and is capable of receiving aircraft of classes Tu-154, equated to them Boeing-737 and Airbus A310, Il-76 and lighter. Regular transport links are carried out from Moscow, Saint Petersburg, Kazan, Anapa, Sochi and Naryan-Mar.

== Sports ==
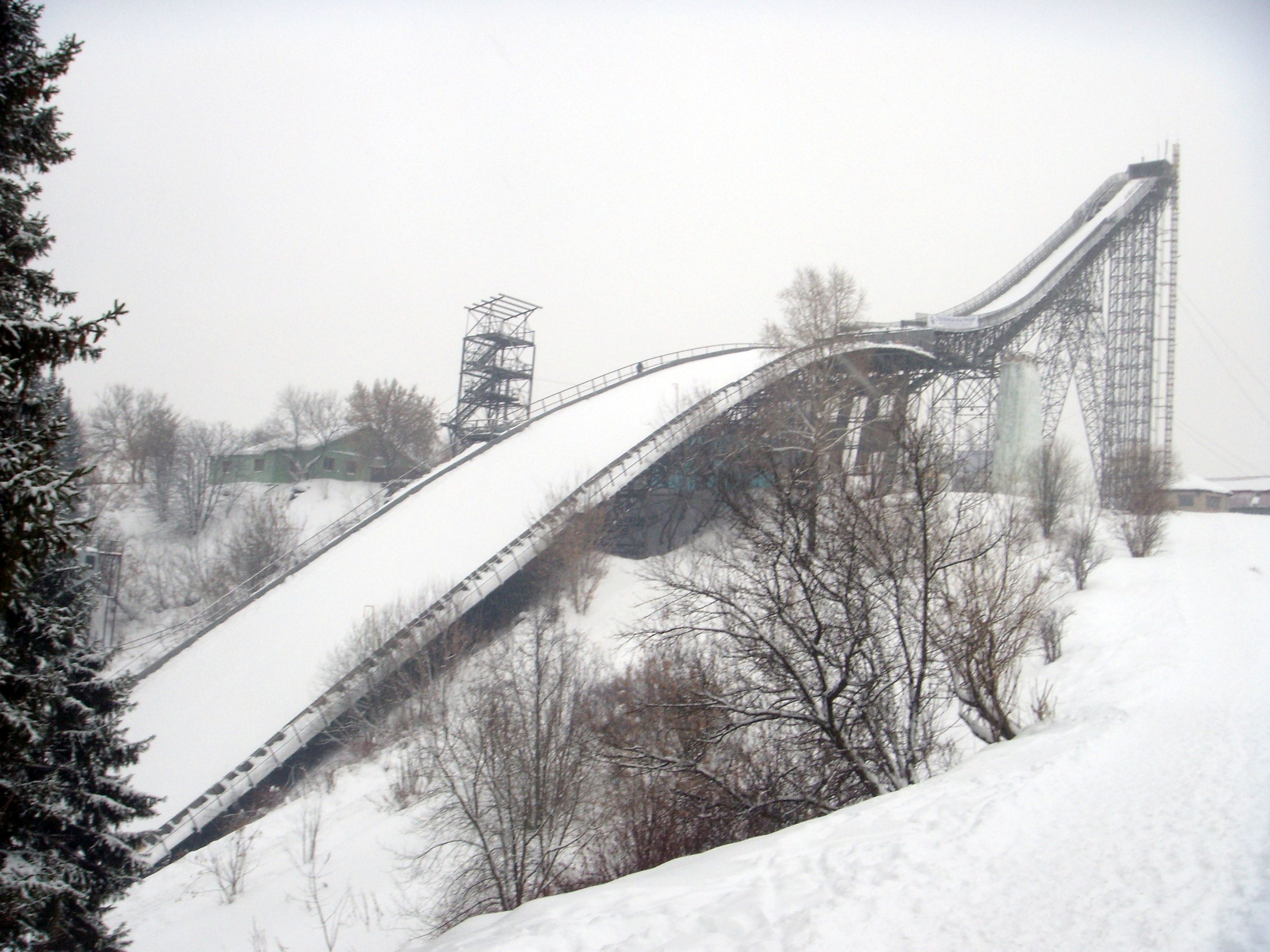
Kirov ski jump

Kirov is one of the sports centers of Russia. Kirov athletes regularly become world champions, winners and prize-winners of World Cup stages, winners and prize-winners of Russian championships and All-Russian competitions.

There are 1,100 sports facilities in the city, including 8 stadiums with bleachers, 264 gyms and 26 swimming pools.

Rodina plays in the highest division of Russian Bandy League. Their home arena has a capacity of 7,500. It was the venue of the national final in 2013. Rodina-2 will participate in the Russian Rink Bandy Cup 2017.

There's also a Kirov sky jump – it's multifunctional ski sports complex Regularly hosts interregional and All-Russian ski competitions.

== Climate ==
Kirov has a humid continental climate (Köppen climate classification Dfb). Summers are warm and rainy, coupled with cool nights, while winters are cold and extremely snowy, with snow falling on most days during winter.

Climate data for Kirov (1991–2020, extremes 1845–present)
Month	Jan	Feb	Mar	Apr	May	Jun	Jul	Aug	Sep	Oct	Nov	Dec	Year
Record high °C (°F)	3.8 (38.8)	6.0 (42.8)	13.9 (57.0)	27.3 (81.1)	34.2 (93.6)	36.9 (98.4)	36.6 (97.9)	35.9 (96.6)	30.1 (86.2)	22.6 (72.7)	11.0 (51.8)	7.0 (44.6)	36.9 (98.4)
Mean daily maximum °C (°F)	−8.4 (16.9)	−6.8 (19.8)	0.1 (32.2)	9.1 (48.4)	17.9 (64.2)	22.0 (71.6)	24.4 (75.9)	21.1 (70.0)	14.7 (58.5)	6.2 (43.2)	−2.0 (28.4)	−6.7 (19.9)	7.6 (45.7)
Daily mean °C (°F)	−11.5 (11.3)	−10.5 (13.1)	−4.0 (24.8)	4.1 (39.4)	11.9 (53.4)	16.4 (61.5)	18.9 (66.0)	15.9 (60.6)	10.2 (50.4)	3.2 (37.8)	−4.3 (24.3)	−9.4 (15.1)	3.4 (38.1)
Mean daily minimum °C (°F)	−14.5 (5.9)	−13.9 (7.0)	−7.7 (18.1)	−0.2 (31.6)	6.5 (43.7)	11.4 (52.5)	13.8 (56.8)	11.6 (52.9)	6.7 (44.1)	0.8 (33.4)	−6.5 (20.3)	−12.2 (10.0)	−0.4 (31.3)
Record low °C (°F)	−53.4 (−64.1)	−40.5 (−40.9)	−33.8 (−28.8)	−21.2 (−6.2)	−10.5 (13.1)	−2.4 (27.7)	2.7 (36.9)	−0.1 (31.8)	−8.3 (17.1)	−23.2 (−9.8)	−39.8 (−39.6)	−45.2 (−49.4)	−53.4 (−64.1)
Average precipitation mm (inches)	51 (2.0)	37 (1.5)	42 (1.7)	39 (1.5)	54 (2.1)	81 (3.2)	82 (3.2)	73 (2.9)	56 (2.2)	69 (2.7)	57 (2.2)	57 (2.2)	698 (27.5)
Average extreme snow depth cm (inches)	44 (17)	55 (22)	56 (22)	13 (5.1)	0 (0)	0 (0)	0 (0)	0 (0)	0 (0)	1 (0.4)	10 (3.9)	25 (9.8)	56 (22)
Average rainy days	6	4	6	14	18	19	18	20	22	20	11	7	165
Average snowy days	28	24	20	9	3	0.3	0	0	1	12	24	28	149
Average relative humidity (%)	85	81	74	65	60	67	70	76	80	84	86	85	76
Mean monthly sunshine hours	35	74	141	201	265	284	269	233	130	61	33	21	1,747
Source 1: Pogoda.ru.net
Source 2: NOAA (sun 1961–1990)

== Gallery ==
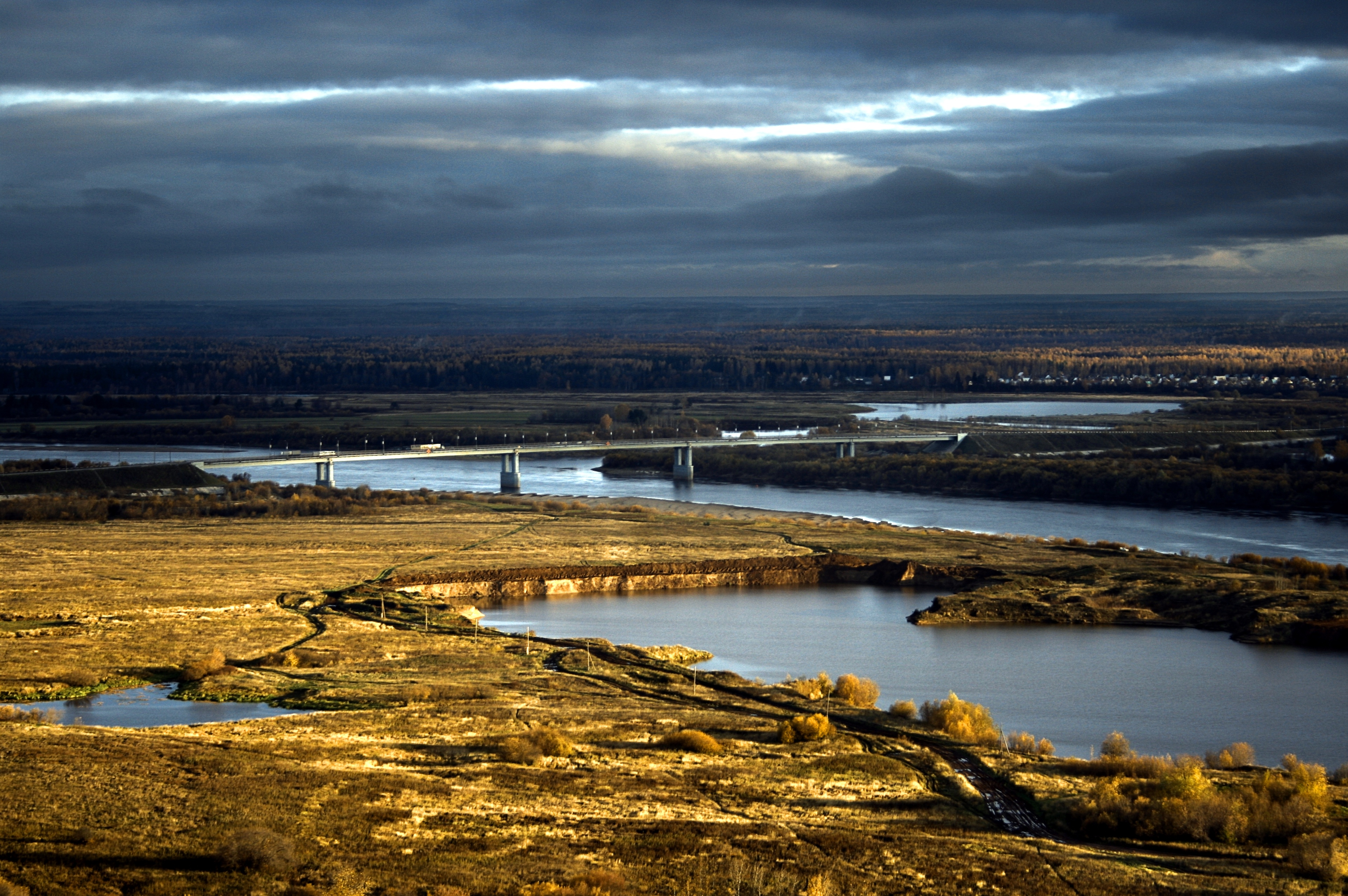
Kirov New bridge

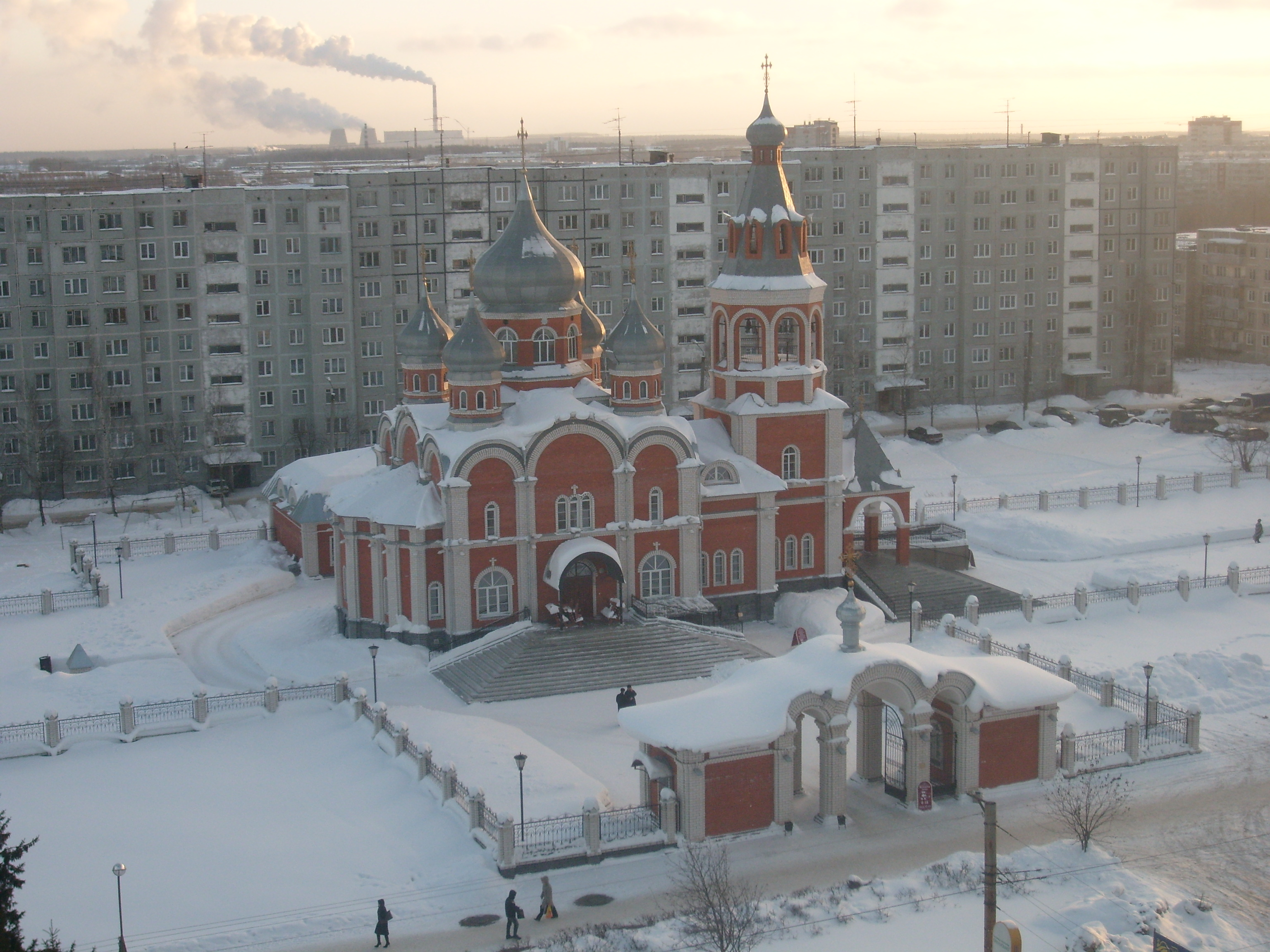
Orthodox Church of the Holy Great Martyr Panteleimon

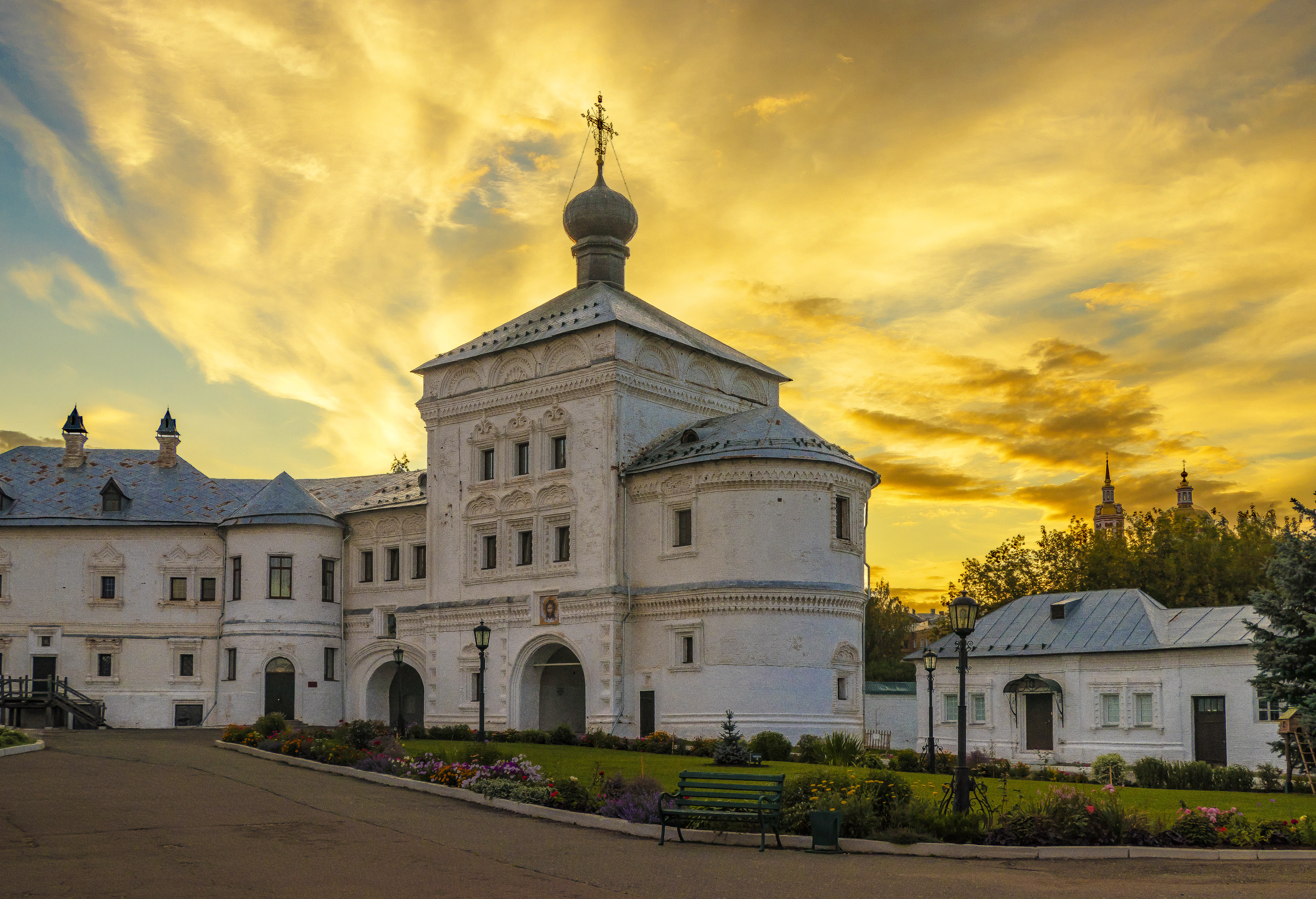
Nadvratnaya Church (St. Nicholas) (part of the Trifonov monastery complex)

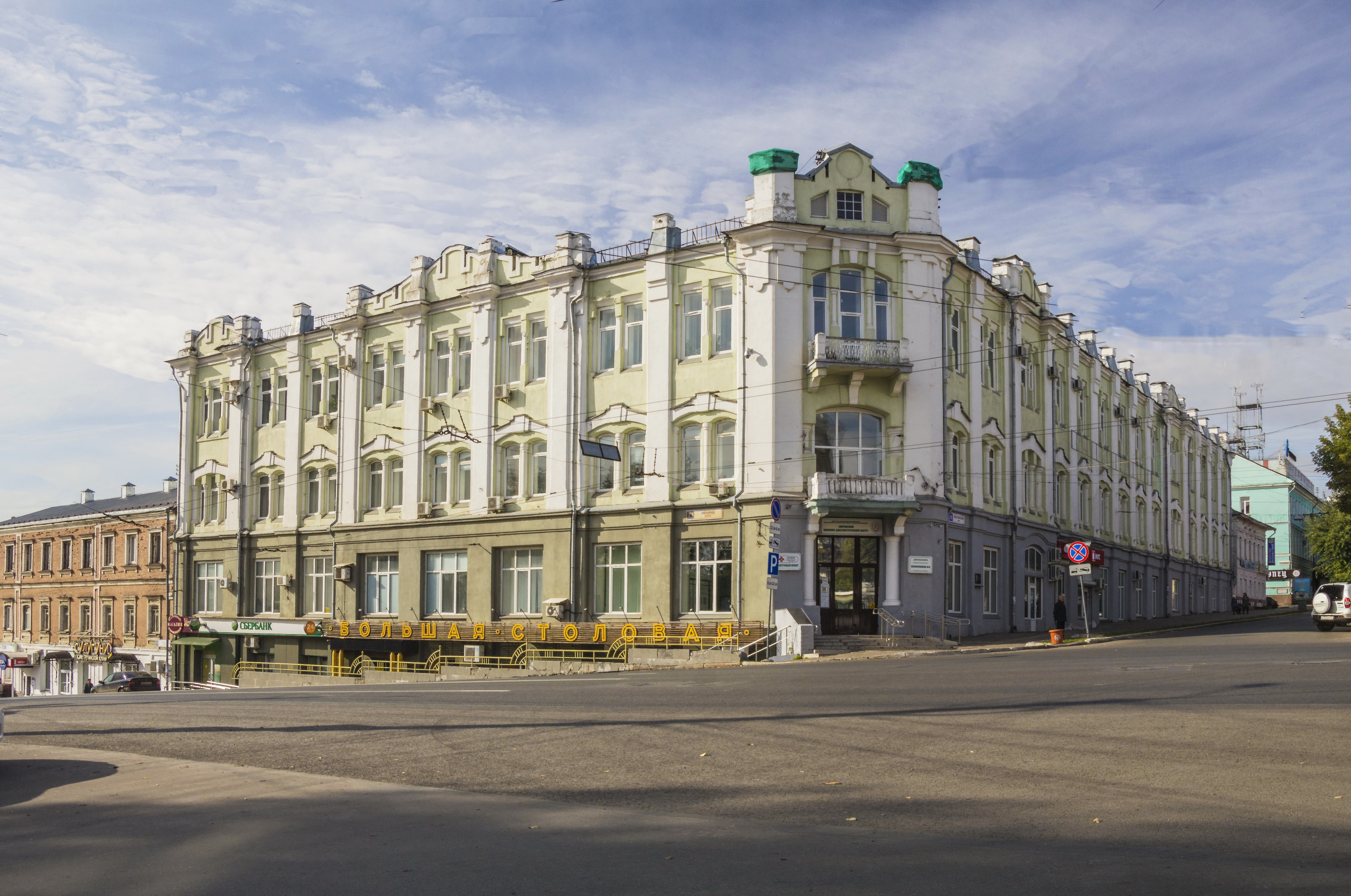
N. Klabukov's house

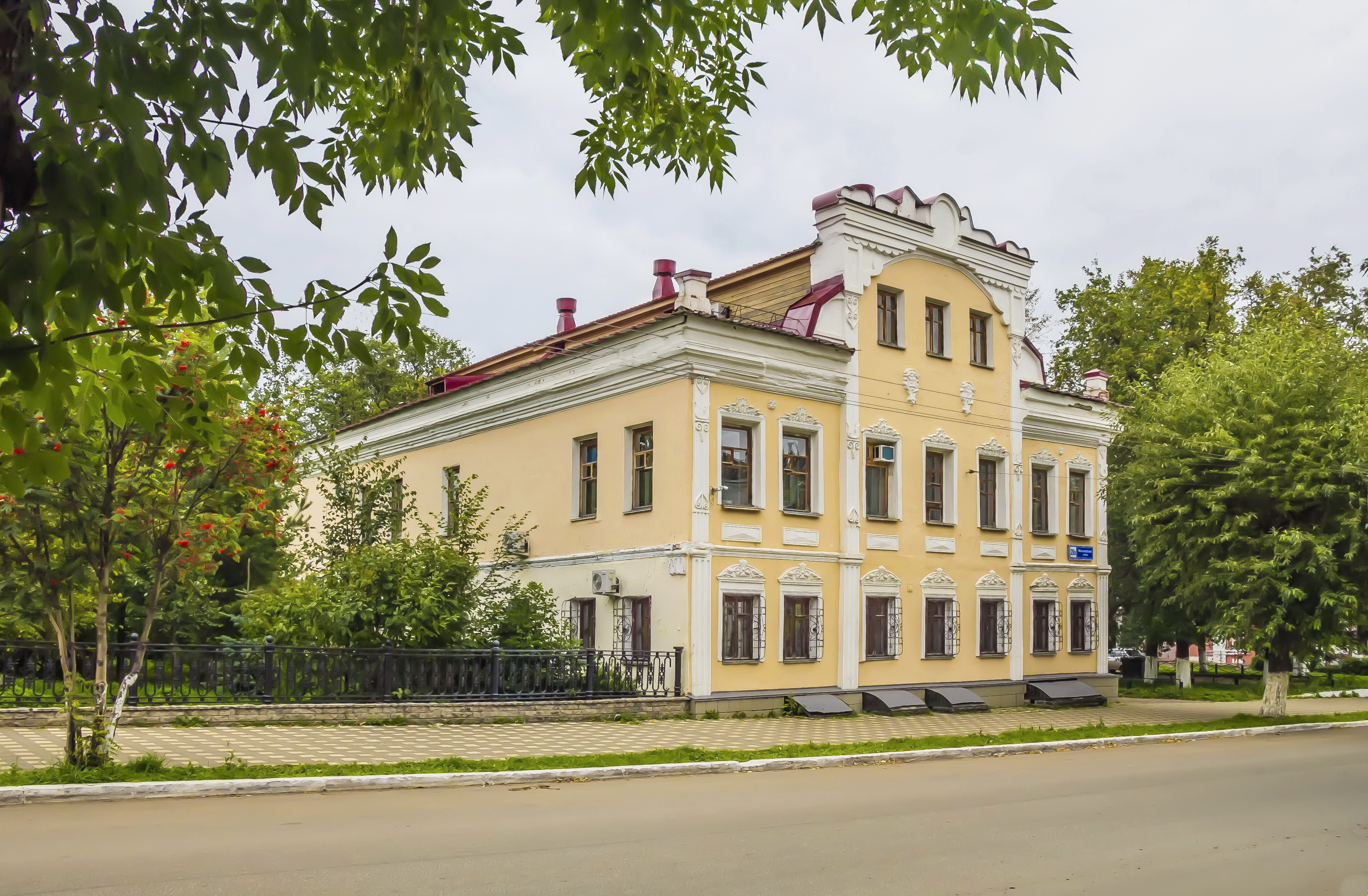
The Karavaevs ' Estate

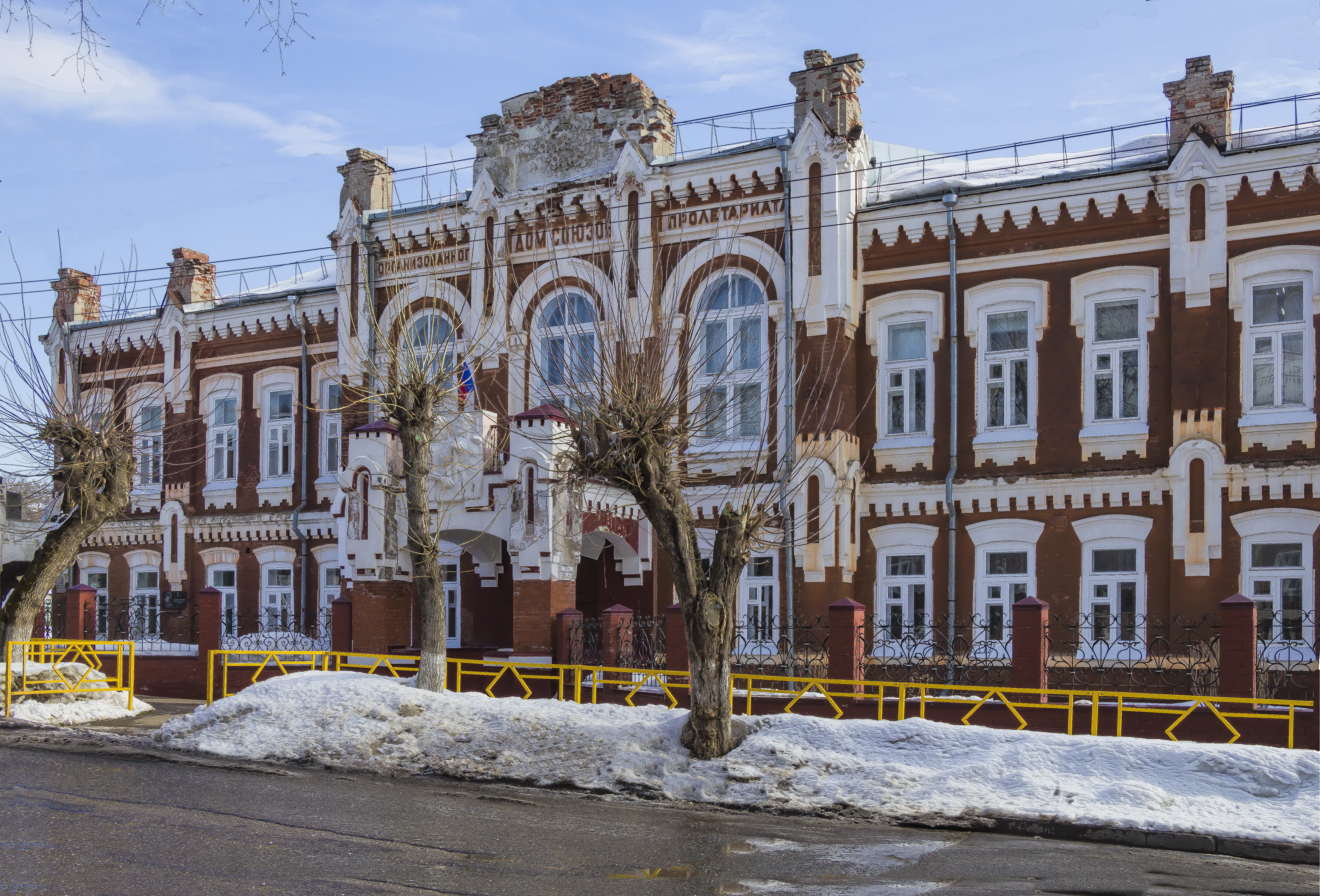
Former House of Unions

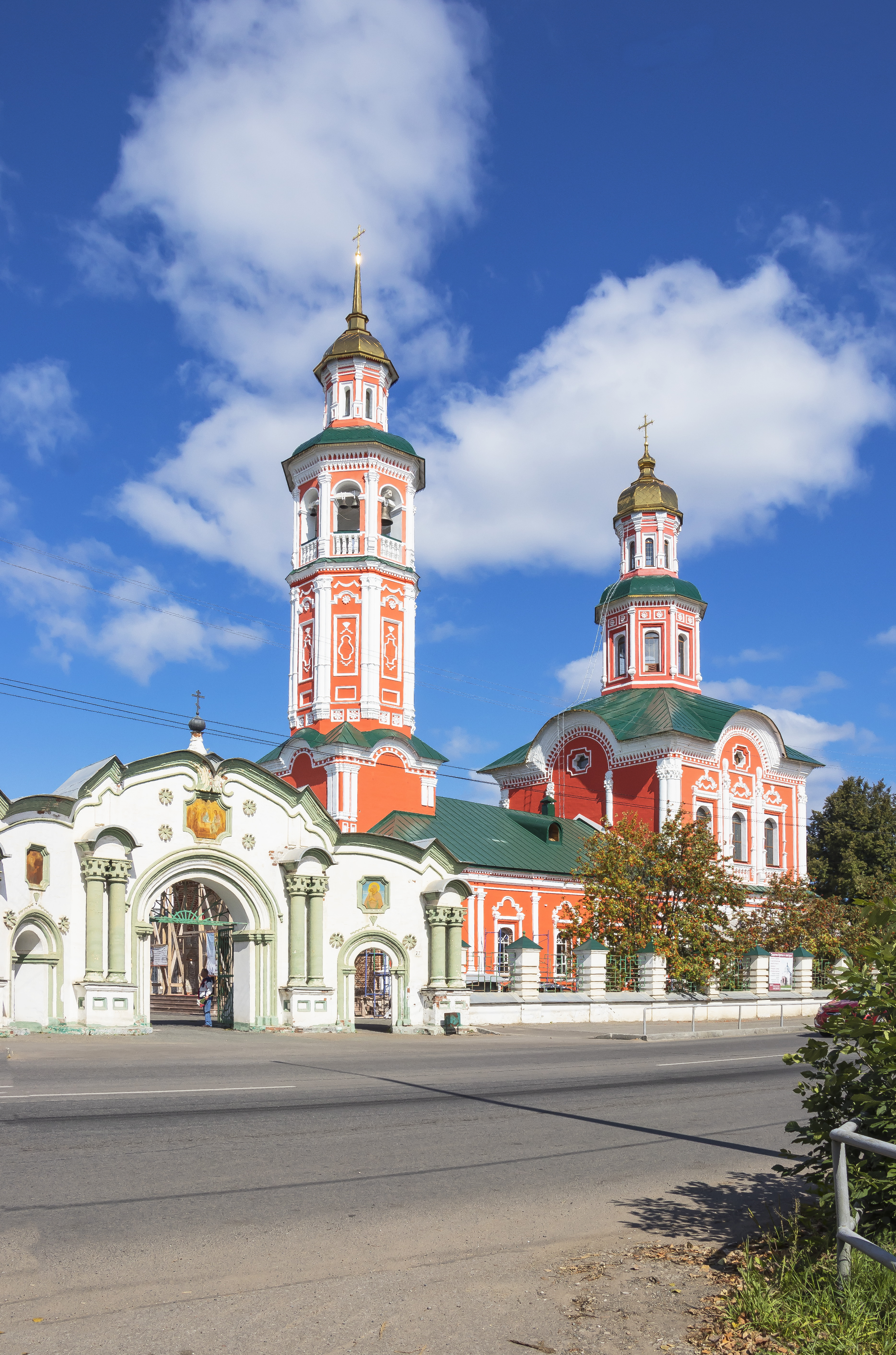
Troitskaya Church

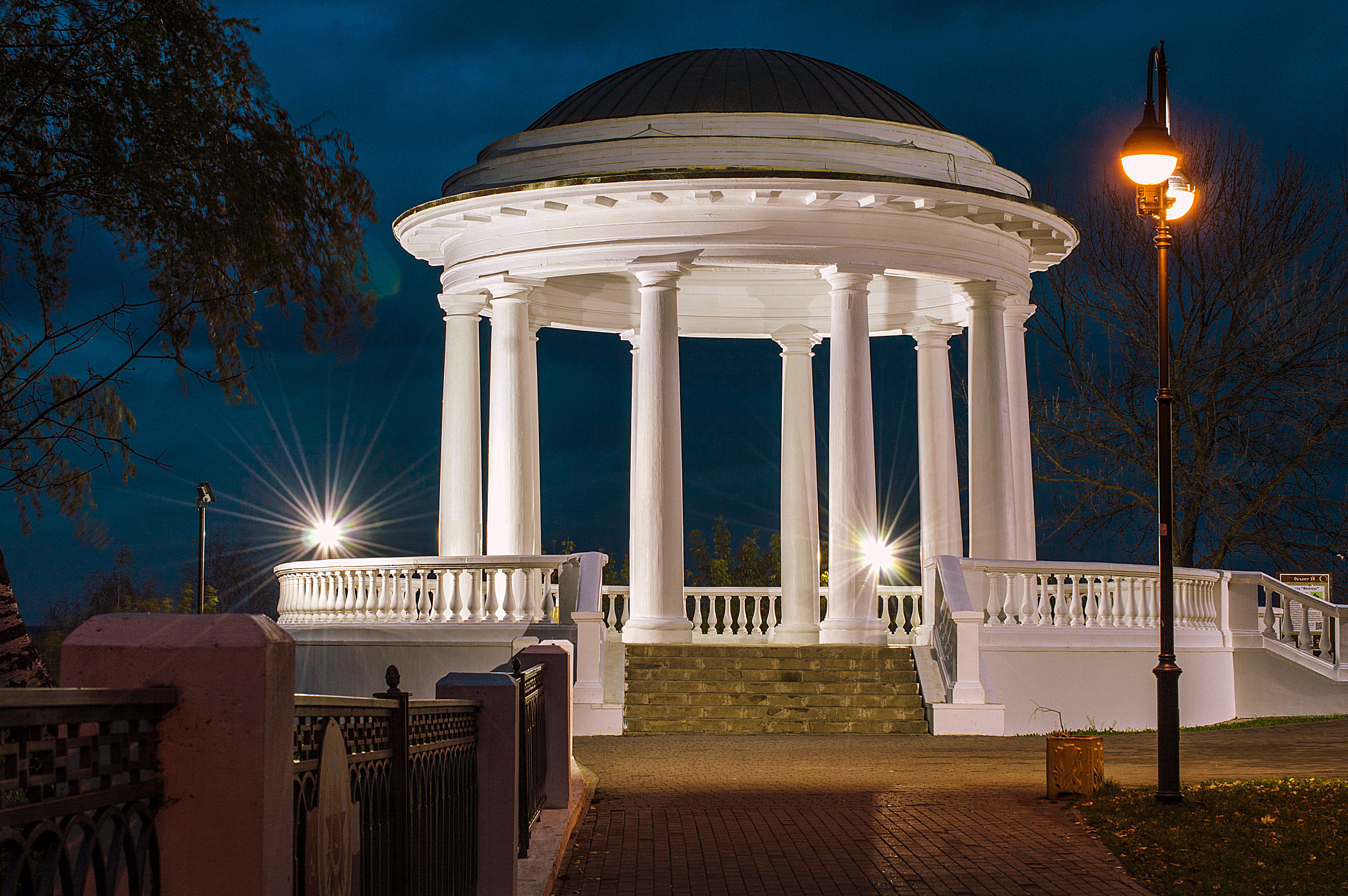
The coastal rotunda in the Alexander Garden

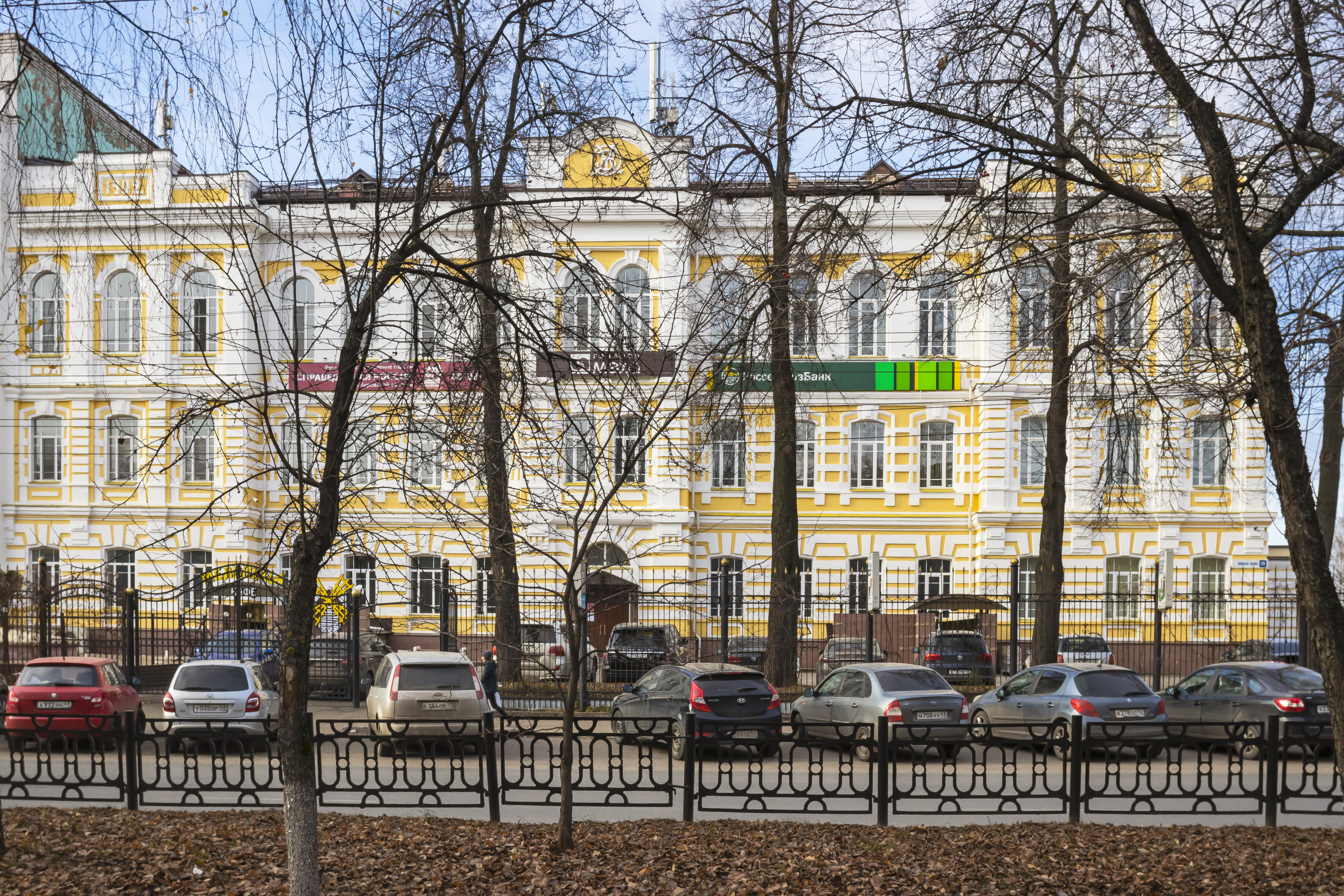
the building of the former agricultural school

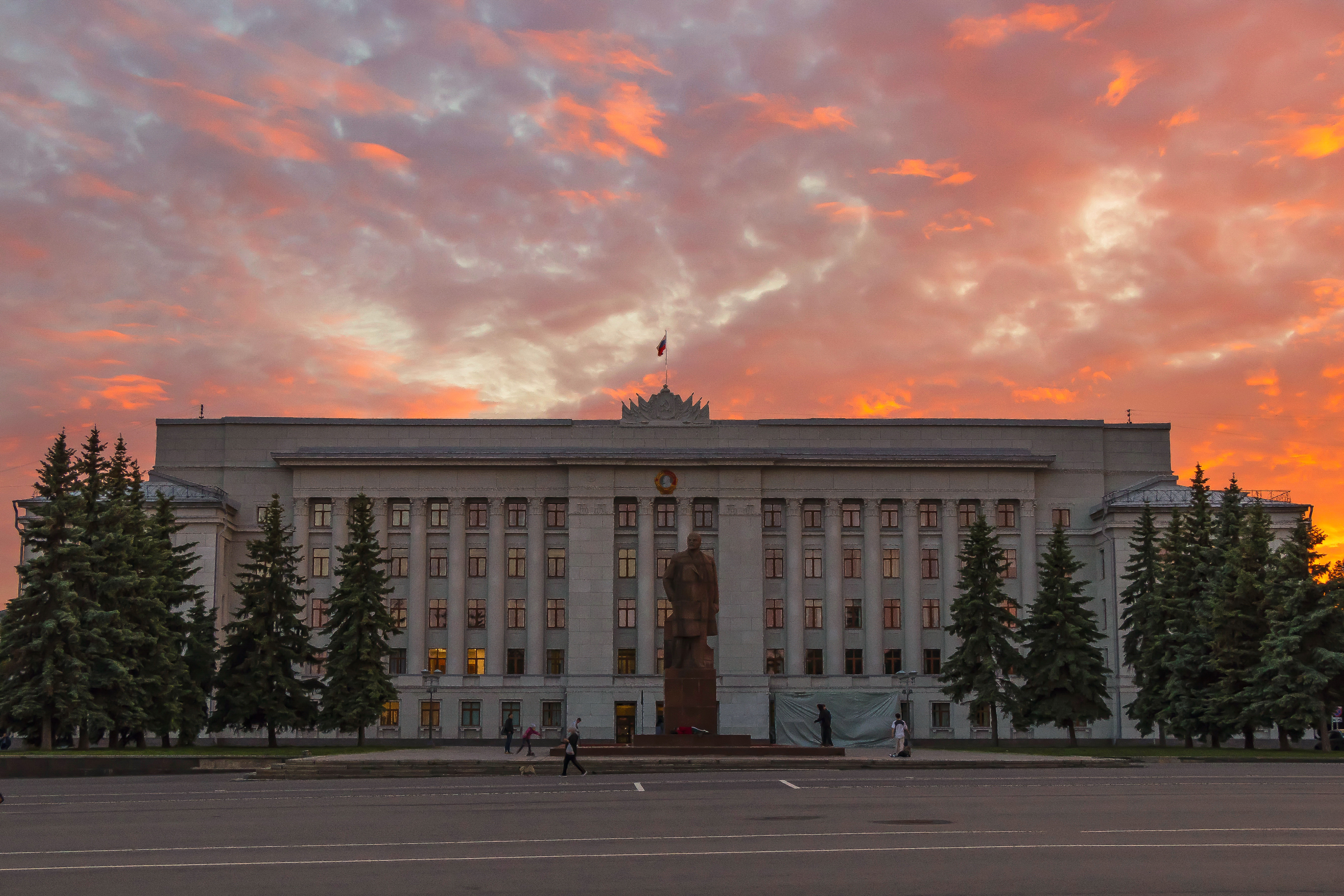
Government House

== Twin towns – sister cities ==
Kirov is twinned with:

- Gomel, Belarus

== Notable people ==
- Anna Alminova (born 1985), middle-distance runner
- Yuri Ardashev (born 1965), theater director, actor
- Ekaterina Atalik (born 1982), chess player
- Mikhail Bagayev (born 1985), association football player
- Aleksey Borovitin (born 1954), ski jumper
- Yevgeny Charushin (1901–1965), illustrator, author of children's literature
- Oksana Domnina (born 1984), ice dancer
- Vyacheslav Dryagin (1940–2002), Nordic combined skier
- Boris Farmakovsky (1870–1928), historian, archaeologist
- Bl. Leonid Feodorov (1879–1935), first Exarch of the Russian Byzantine Catholic Church
- Matvey Gusev (1826–1866), astronomer
- Maria Isakova (1918–2011), speed skater
- Kirill Khaliavin (born 1990), ice dancer
- Lev Knyazev (1926–2012), writer
- Olga Kuragina (born 1959), athlete
- Alexey Kuzmichev (born 1962), businessman
- Boris Kuznetsov (born 1944), lawyer
- Andrei Malykh (born 1988), association football player
- Ksenia Monko (born 1992), ice dancer
- Sergey Obukhov (born 1974), bandy player
- Svetlana Pletnyova (1926–2008), historian, archaeologist
- Aleksei Pugin (born 1987), association football player
- Ivan Shefer (born 1983), ice dancer
- Yekaterina Shikhova (born 1985), speed skater
- Alexei Sitnikov (born 1986), ice dancer
- Alexander Stolbov (born 1929), painter
- Nikolai Tchaikovsky (1851–1926), revolutionary, politician
- Mikhail Tyufyakov (born 1974), association football player and manager
- Vladimir Urin (born 1947), theater director, actor
- Yuri Vshivtsev (1940–2010), association football player
- Valentin Yanin (1929–2020), historian, archaeologist
- Julia Zlobina (born 1989), ice dancer
- Polina Khonina (born 1998), rhythmic gymnast
