= Leonid Nikolaev =

Assassin of Sergei Kirov (1904–1934)

- Born: 10 May 1904; St. Petersburg, Russian Empire
- Died: 29 December 1934 (aged 30); Leningrad, Soviet Union
- Cause of death: Execution by shooting
- Political party: All-Union Communist Party (Bolsheviks) (1923–1933)
- Spouse: Milda Draule

Leonid Vasilevich Nikolaev (10 May 1904 – 29 December 1934) was the Russian assassin of Sergei Kirov, the First Secretary of the Leningrad City Committee of the Communist Party of the Soviet Union.

== Early life ==
Nikolaev was a young Soviet Communist Party member in Leningrad. He was a small, thin man, about 152 centimetres (5 ft) tall; even as an adult he showed the effects of childhood malnutrition. He had difficulty keeping a job, and had been reprimanded by the Party for having refused a job that was not to his liking. Eventually, the Party expelled him as a member. Unemployed, he soon depleted his money, and blamed the Party for his troubles.

== Assassination of Sergei Kirov ==
It is unknown whether Nikolaev had prior dealings with the Leningrad branch of the Soviet government, directed by Kirov. As Nikolaev's troubles increased, he became steadily more obsessed with the idea of "striking a blow". On 15 October 1934, he was arrested by the NKVD, allegedly for loitering around the Smolny Institute, where Kirov had his offices. The Smolny guards discovered a loaded 7.62 mm Nagant M1895 revolver in Nikolaev's briefcase. Some Soviet sources argued later that Nikolaev had a permit to carry a loaded handgun. After Nikolaev's visit, the NKVD failed to augment Kirov's security. Instead, it withdrew all police protection for Kirov with the exception of a police escort to Smolny and a guarded security post at the entrance to his offices.

On the afternoon of 1 December 1934, Nikolaev paid a final visit to the Smolny Institute offices. With Stalin's alleged approval, the NKVD had previously withdrawn the remaining guards manning the security desk at Smolny. Unopposed, Nikolaev went to the third floor, where he shot Kirov in the back of the neck with his Nagant revolver. Author and former Soviet official Alexander Barmine states, "the negligence of the NKVD in protecting such a high party official was without precedent in the Soviet Union".

According to later press accounts and party communiques, which were never substantiated, Nikolaev was apprehended with the aid of an electrician, Platanov, who was working in the area. Kirov's bodyguard, M.V. Borisov, also rushed to and helped subdue Nikolaev, who was said to have collapsed and had to be carried away.

== Aftermath and responsibility for Kirov's death ==
After Kirov's death, Stalin demanded swift punishment of the traitors and those found negligent in Kirov's death. Borisov was arrested immediately. He died the day after Kirov's assassination, allegedly as the result of a fall from a truck in which he was being transported by the NKVD. On 28–29 December 1934, Nikolaev and 13 other people as members of the "counterrevolutionary group" were tried by the Military Collegium of the Supreme Court of the USSR commanded by Vasili Ulrikh. At 5:45 a.m., 29 December, all of them were sentenced to death and executed by shooting an hour later.

Several NKVD officers from the Leningrad branch were convicted of negligence for not adequately protecting Kirov and were sentenced to prison terms of as much as ten years. Barmine claimed they never served their prison sentences. Instead, they were transferred to executive posts in Stalin's labour camps for a period of time, in effect, a demotion. Initially, a Communist Party communiqué reported that Nikolaev's guilt had been established and that he had confessed that he acted at the behest of a 'fascist power', receiving money from an unidentified 'foreign consul' in Leningrad. Barmine claimed that 104 other defendants, who were already in prison at the time of Kirov's assassination, who had no demonstrable connection to Nikolaev, were found guilty of complicity with the 'fascist plot' against Kirov and were summarily executed.

A few days later, during a Communist Party meeting of the Moscow District, the Party secretary announced in a speech that Nikolaev had been personally interrogated by Stalin the day after the assassination, an unheard-of event for a party leader such as Stalin, "Comrade Stalin personally directed the investigation of Kirov's assassination. He questioned Nikolaev at length. The leaders of the Opposition placed the gun in Nikolaev's hand!".

Other speakers rose to condemn the Opposition, "The Central Committee must be pitiless – the Party must be purged ... the record of every member must be scrutinized ... ." No one at the meeting mentioned the theory of fascist agents. Later, Stalin used the Kirov assassination to eliminate the remainder of the Opposition leadership against him, accusing Grigory Zinoviev, Lev Kamenev, Abram Prigozhin and others who had stood with Kirov in opposing Stalin (or simply failed to acquiesce to Stalin's policies), of having associations with Nikolaev and facilitating the assassination.

After Nikolaev's death, there was some speculation that his motivation for killing Kirov may have been more personal. His Latvian-Russian wife, Milda Draule, worked at the Smolny. Unsubstantiated rumours surfaced that she was having an affair with Kirov. It is unknown whether these had a basis in fact, or were fostered deliberately by the NKVD. According to Amy Knight, Nikolaev's wife was noted for her physical plainness, while Kirov was known to prefer liaisons with ballerinas and other Soviet women of notable beauty and grace. Other theories claim that Stalin was involved with the assassination. This claim originates from former Soviet colonel and defector Alexander Orlov. Robert W. Thurston notes that nothing in Nikolaev's personal diary indicates that he did not perform the assassination on his own.

Kirov's death was an important part of the sequence of events that resulted in Stalin's Great Purge. Author and Menshevik scholar Boris Nikolaevsky observed, "One thing is certain: the only man who profited by the Kirov assassination was Stalin."

== Bibliography ==
- Barmine, Alexander, One Who Survived, New York: G.P. Putnam (1945)
- Knight, Amy, Who Killed Kirov: The Kremlin's Greatest Mystery
