= Sergei Kirov =

Soviet politician and revolutionary (1886–1934)

- Сергей Киров
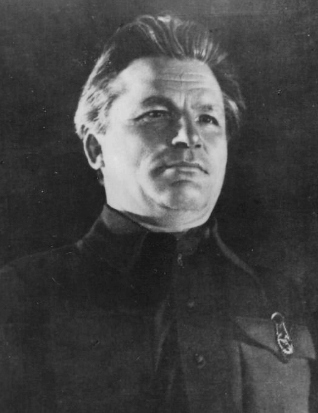
- Kirov c. 1930s

First Secretary of the Central Committee of the Azerbaijani Communist Party
- In office 24 July 1921 – 21 January 1926
- Preceded by: Grigory Kaminsky
- Succeeded by: Levon Mirzoyan

First Secretary of the Leningrad Regional Committee of the All-Union Communist Party (Bolsheviks)
- In office 1 August 1927 – 1 December 1934
- Preceded by: Post established
- Succeeded by: Andrey Zhdanov

First Secretary of the Leningrad City Committee of the All-Union Communist Party (Bolsheviks)
- In office 8 January 1926 – 1 December 1934
- Preceded by: Grigory Yevdokimov
- Succeeded by: Andrey Zhdanov

Full member of the 16th, 17th Politburo
- In office 13 July 1930 – 1 December 1934
Additional positions
Candidate member of the 14th, 15th Politburo
In office
23 July 1926 – 13 July 1930
Member of the 17th Secretariat
In office
10 February – 1 December 1934
Full member of the 17th Orgburo
In office
10 February – 1 December 1934

Personal details
- Born: Sergei Mironovich Kostrikov; 27 March 1886 Urzhum, Russia
- Died: 1 December 1934 (aged 48) Leningrad, Soviet Union
- Cause of death: Assassination
- Resting place: Kremlin Wall Necropolis, Moscow
- Party: RSDLP (Bolsheviks) (1904–1918); All-Union Communist Party (Bolsheviks) (1918–1934)

Sergei Mironovich Kirov (Note: In this name that follows East Slavic naming customs, the patronymic is Mironovich and the family name is Kirov.) (Note: Russian: Сергей Миронович Киров) (born Kostrikov; (Note: Russian: Ко́стриков) 27 March 1886 – 1 December 1934) was a Russian and Soviet politician and Bolshevik revolutionary. Kirov was an early revolutionary in the Russian Empire and a member of the Bolshevik faction of the Russian Social Democratic Labour Party. Kirov became an Old Bolshevik and personal friend to Joseph Stalin, rising through the Communist Party of the Soviet Union ranks to become head of the party in Leningrad and a member of the Politburo.

On 1 December 1934, Kirov was shot and killed by Leonid Nikolaev at his offices in the Smolny Institute. Nikolaev and several alleged accomplices were convicted in a show trial and executed less than 30 days later. Kirov's assassination was used by Stalin as a reason for starting the Moscow trials and the Great Purge.

== Early life ==
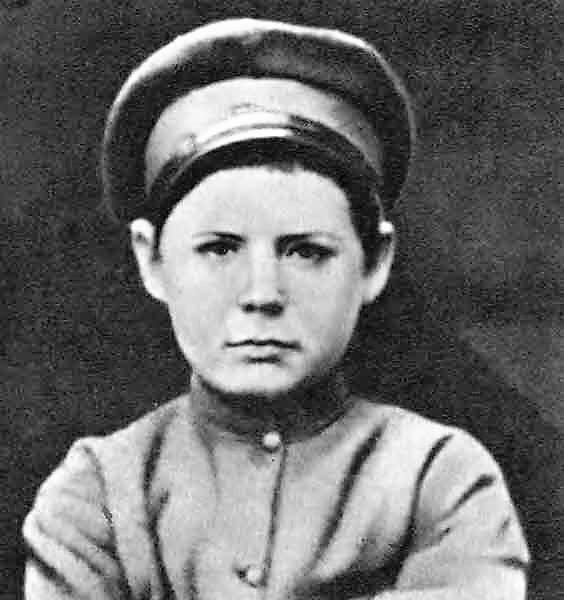
Kirov as a child, 1893

Sergei Mironovich Kostrikov was born on 27 March [O.S. 15 March] 1886 in Urzhum in Vyatka Governorate, Russian Empire, as one of seven children born to Miron Ivanovich Kostrikov and Yekaterina Kuzminichna Kostrikova (née Kazantseva). Their first four children had died young. Anna (born 1883), Sergei (1886), and Yelizaveta (1889) survived.

Miron, an alcoholic, abandoned the family around 1890. Yekaterina died of tuberculosis in 1893. Sergei and his sisters were raised for a brief time by their paternal grandmother, Melania Avdeyevna Kostrikova, but she could not afford to take care of them all on her small pension of 3 rubles per month. Through her connections, Melania succeeded in having Sergey placed in an orphanage at the age of seven, but he saw his sisters and grandmother regularly.

In 1901, a group of wealthy benefactors provided a scholarship for Kirov to attend an industrial school at Kazan. After gaining a degree in engineering, Kirov moved to Tomsk, a city in Siberia, where he became a Marxist and joined the Russian Social Democratic Labour Party (RSDLP) in 1904.

== Revolutionary ==
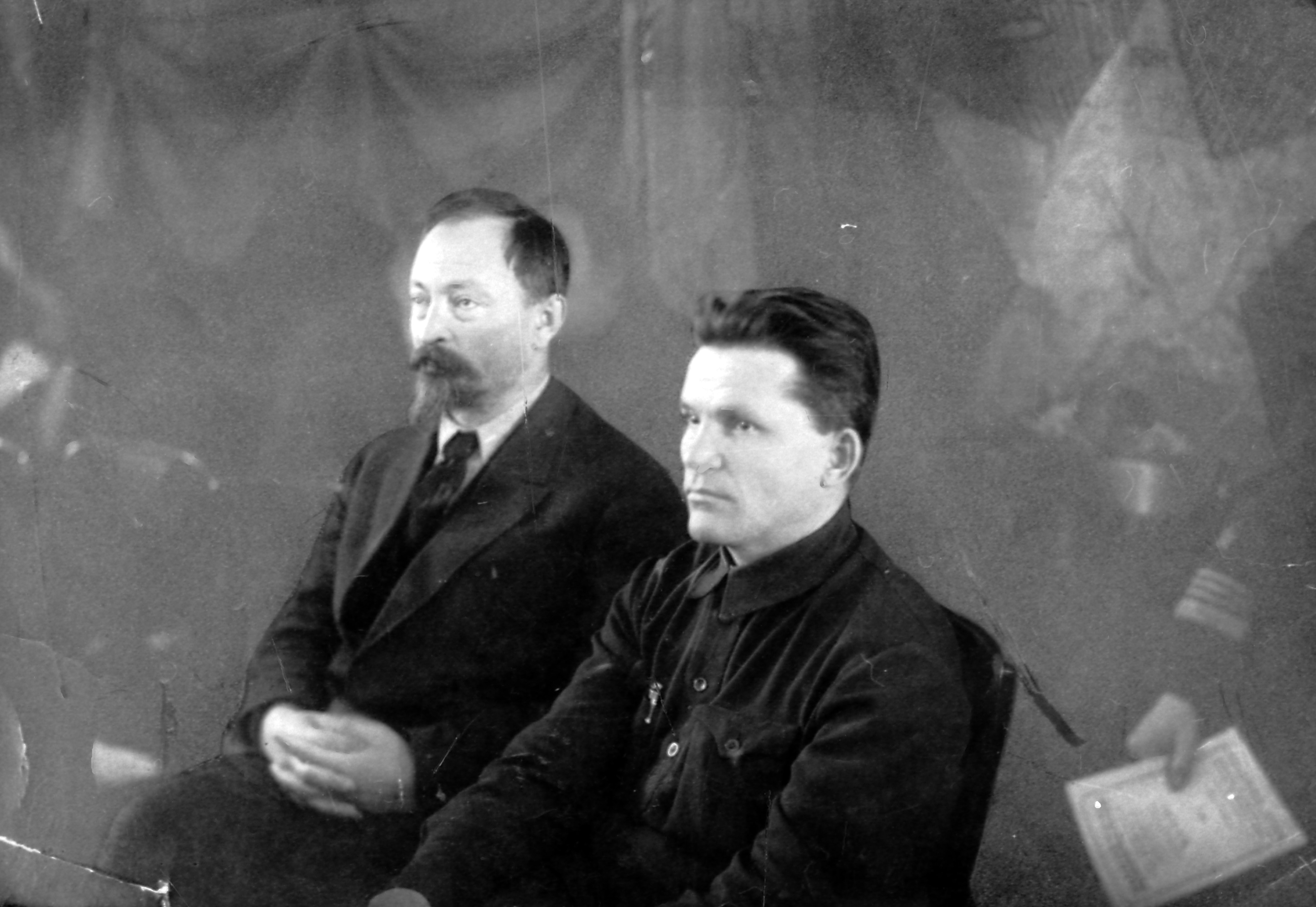
Kirov (right) with Felix Dzerzhinsky in Leningrad, 1926

Kirov was a participant in the Russian Revolution of 1905 and was arrested, joining the Bolsheviks soon after being released from prison. In 1906, he was arrested again and jailed for over three years, charged with printing illegal literature. After a year in custody, Kirov moved to the Caucasus, where he stayed until the abdication of Tsar Nicholas II after the February Revolution in March 1917.

By this time, Kirov had shortened his last name from Kostrikov to Kirov, a practice common among Russian revolutionaries of the time. Kirov began using the pen name Kir, first publishing under the pseudonym Kirov on 26 April 1912. One account states that he chose the name Kir, the Russian version of Cyrus (from the Greek Kūros), after a Christian martyr in third-century Egypt from an Orthodox calendar of saints' days, and Russifying it by adding an -ov suffix. A second story is that Kirov based it on the name of the Persian king Cyrus the Great.

Kirov became commander of the Bolshevik military administration in Astrakhan and fought for the Red Army in the Russian Civil War until 1920. Simon Sebag Montefiore writes: "During the Civil War, he was one of the swashbuckling commissars in the North Caucasus beside Ordzhonikidze and Mikoyan. In Astrakhan he enforced Bolshevik power in March 1919 with liberal bloodletting; more than 4,000 were killed. When a bourgeois was caught hiding his own furniture, Kirov ordered him shot."

== Career ==
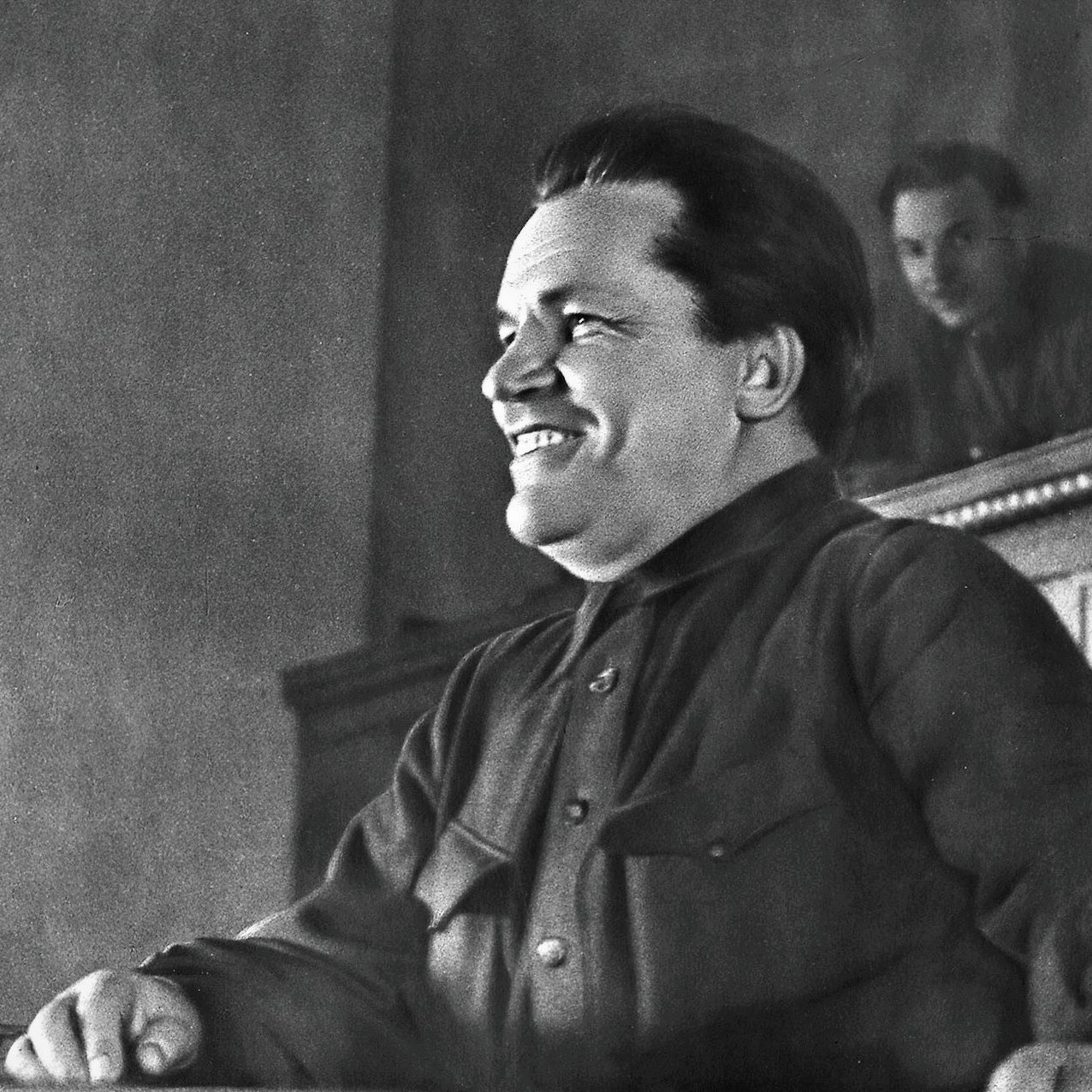
Kirov at the 17th Congress of the Communist Party in 1934

In 1921, Kirov became First Secretary of the Communist Party of Azerbaijan, the Bolshevik party organization in the Azerbaijan SSR. Kirov was a loyal supporter of Joseph Stalin, the successor of Vladimir Lenin, and in 1926 was rewarded with command of the Leningrad party organization. Kirov was a close personal friend of Stalin, and a strong supporter of industrialisation and forced collectivisation.

At the 16th Congress of the All-Union Communist Party (Bolsheviks) in 1930, Kirov stated: "The General Party line is to conduct the course of our country industrialization. Based on the industrialisation, we conduct transformation of our agriculture. Namely, we centralise and collectivise."

In 1934, at the 17th Congress of the All-Union Communist Party (Bolsheviks), Kirov delivered the speech called "The Speech of Comrade Stalin Is the Program of Our Party", which refers to Stalin's speech delivered at the Congress earlier. Kirov praised Stalin for everything he had done since the death of Lenin. Kirov personally named and ridiculed Nikolai Bukharin, Alexei Rykov, and Mikhail Tomsky—former party allies of Stalin. Bukharin and Rykov were later tried in the show trial called The Trial of the Twenty-One accused of Kirov's death. Tomsky committed suicide, while expecting his arrest by the NKVD.

== Reputation ==
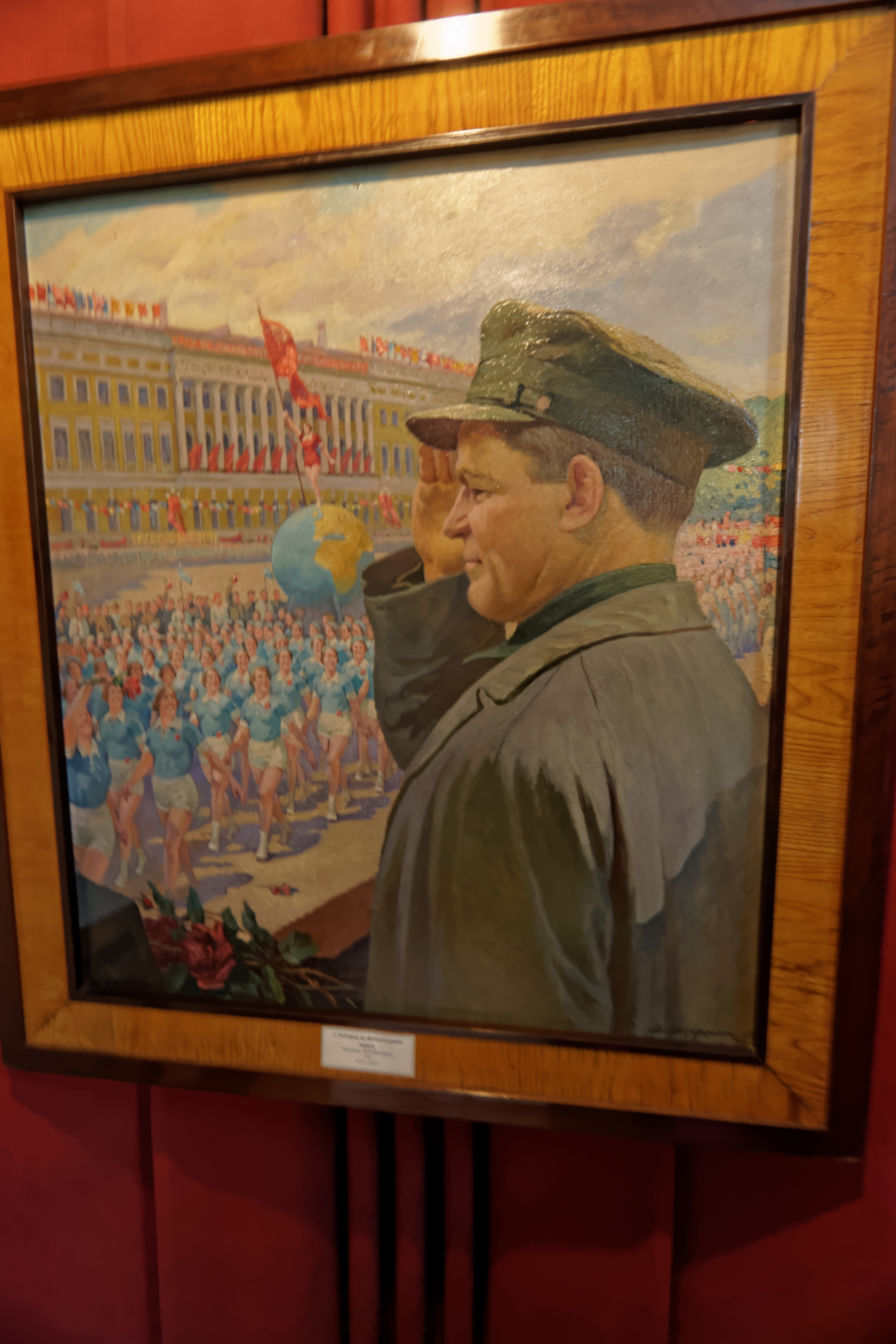
A portrait of Kirov from the Sergei Kirov Museum in his former apartment in Saint Petersburg.

After his assassination, Kirov acquired a reputation for having repeatedly stood up to Stalin in private and for becoming so popular that he was a threat to Stalin's supremacy, as he displayed some independence from Stalin. In an alleged example from 1932, Stalin wanted to have Martemyan Ryutin executed for writing an attack on his leadership, but Kirov and Sergo Ordzhonikidze talked him out of it.

Alexander Orlov, who defected to the West, listed a series of incidents in which Kirov allegedly clashed with Stalin, based on rumours he must have heard from fellow NKVD officers. Kirov's reputed rivalry is a major theme of the historical novel Children of the Arbat, by Anatoli Rybakov, who wrote:

In his hunger for popularity, Kirov opted for the simple style. He lived on Kamennoostrovsky Prospekt in a large house, inhabited by all sorts of people, he walked to work, wandered on his own around the streets of the city, took his children for rides in his car and played hide-and-seek with them in the yard ... as if to emphasize that Stalin lived in the Kremlin, with guards, didn't wander the streets or play hide-and-seek with his children, thus underlining the idea that Stalin was afraid of the people, whereas Kirov was not.

At the end of the Communist Party's Seventeenth Congress in February 1934, there is reputed to have been a scandal, when Kirov topped the poll in elections to the Central Committee, and Stalin's acolyte, Lazar Kaganovich ordered a number of ballots be destroyed so that Stalin and Kirov could share top billing. Amy Knight, a historian of the Soviet Union, suggests that whereas Kirov "might have toed the line as others did, on the other hand, he might have acted as a rallying point for those who wanted to oppose his [Stalin's] dictatorship." Knight suggests that Kirov would not have been a willing accomplice when the full force of Stalin's terror was unleashed in Leningrad.

Knight's contention is supported by the fact that whereas most of the elite tried to anticipate what Stalin desired and to act accordingly, Kirov did not always do what Stalin wanted. In 1934, Stalin wanted Kirov to come to Moscow permanently. Whereas all the other members of the Politburo would have complied, Stalin accepted that, as Kirov had no desire to leave Leningrad, he would not come to Moscow until 1938. When Stalin wanted Filipp Medved moved from the Leningrad NKVD to Minsk, Kirov refused to agree; in a rare move for Stalin, he had to accept defeat.

== Assassination ==
In the first days when Leningrad was orphaned, Stalin rushed there. He went to the place where the crime against our country was committed. The enemy did not fire at Kirov personally. No! He fired at the proletarian revolution.

— Pravda, 5 December 1934

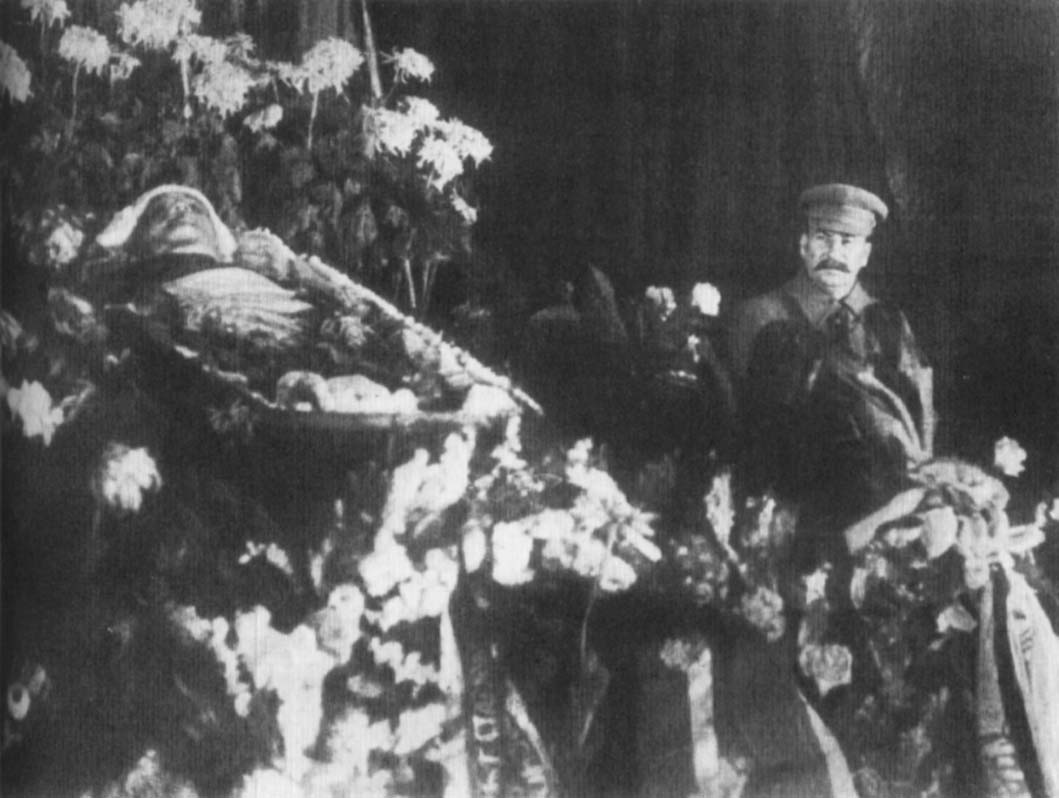
Stalin looking at Sergei Kirov's coffin

On the afternoon of Saturday, 1 December 1934, Kirov's assassin, Leonid Nikolayev, arrived at the Smolny Institute offices and made his way to the third floor unopposed, waiting in a hallway until Kirov and his bodyguard Borisov stepped into the corridor. Borisov appeared to have stayed some 20 to 40 paces behind Kirov, with some sources alleging Borisov parted company with Kirov in order to prepare his lunch. Kirov turned a corner and passed Nikolayev, who then drew his revolver and shot Kirov in the back of the neck.

Nikolayev was well known to the NKVD, which had arrested him for various petty offences in recent years. Accounts of his life agree that he was an expelled party member and a failed junior functionary, with a murderous grudge and an indifference to his own survival. Nikolayev was unemployed, with a wife and child, and in financial difficulties. According to Orlov, Nikolayev had allegedly told a friend he wanted to kill the head of the party control commission that had expelled him. Nikolayev's friend reported this to the NKVD. Ivan Zaporozhets then allegedly enlisted Nikolayev's friend to contact him, giving him money and a loaded 7.62 mm Nagant M1895 revolver.

Nikolayev's first attempt at killing Kirov failed. On 15 October 1934, Nikolayev packed his Nagant revolver in a briefcase and entered the Smolny Institute where Kirov now worked. Although Nikolayev was initially passed by the main security desk at Smolny, he was arrested after an alert guard asked to examine his briefcase, which was found to contain the revolver. A few hours later, Nikolayev's briefcase and loaded revolver were returned to him, and he was told to leave the building.

With Stalin's approval, the NKVD withdrew all but four police bodyguards assigned to Kirov. These four guards accompanied Kirov each day to his offices at the Smolny Institute and then left. On 1 December 1934, the usual guard post at the entrance to Kirov's offices was supposedly left unmanned, even though the building housed the chief offices of the Leningrad party apparatus and was the seat of the local government.

According to some reports, only a single friend, Commissar Borisov, an unarmed bodyguard of Kirov's, remained. Given the circumstances of Kirov's death, Alexander Barmine stated that "the negligence of the NKVD in protecting such a high party official was without precedent in the Soviet Union."

=== Aftermath ===
Kirov was cremated and his ashes interred in the Kremlin Wall Necropolis in a state funeral, with Stalin and other prominent members of the CPSU personally carrying his coffin. After Kirov's death, Stalin called for swift punishment of the traitors and those found negligent in Kirov's death. Nikolayev was tried alone and secretly by Vasili Ulrikh, Chairman of the Military Collegium of the Supreme Court of the USSR. He was sentenced to death by shooting on 29 December 1934. The sentence was carried out that night. The Soviet government, led by Stalin, stated that their investigation proved that the assassin was acting on behalf of a secret Zinovievist group.

Commissar Borisov died the day after Kirov's assassination, allegedly falling from a moving truck while riding with a group of NKVD agents. According to Orlov, Borisov's wife was committed to an insane asylum. Nikolayev's mysterious friend and alleged provocateur, who had supplied him with the revolver and money, was later shot on Stalin's personal orders.

Several NKVD officers from the Leningrad branch were convicted of negligence for not adequately protecting Kirov and sentenced to prison terms of up to ten years. According to Barmine, none of the NKVD officers were executed in the aftermath, and none served time in prison. Instead, they were transferred to executive posts in Stalin's Gulag labour camps for a period of time—in effect, a demotion. According to Nikita Khrushchev, the same NKVD officers were shot in 1937. Lajos Magyar, a Hungarian communist and refugee from the fall of the Hungarian Soviet Republic of 1919, was falsely accused of complicity in Kirov's assassination. Magyar was convicted as a "Zinovievite-Terrorist" and sent to a Gulag, where he died in 1940.

A Communist Party communiqué initially reported that Nikolayev had confessed his guilt as an assassin in the pay of a "fascist power," having received money from an unidentified "foreign consul" in Leningrad. The same author claims 104 defendants who were already in prison at the time of Kirov's assassination, and who had no demonstrable connection to Nikolayev, were found guilty of complicity in the "fascist plot" against Kirov, and summarily executed.

A few days later, during a subsequent Communist Party meeting of the Moscow District, the party secretary announced in a speech that Nikolayev had been personally interrogated by Stalin the day after the assassination, something unheard-of for a party leader such as Stalin to have done. He said: "Comrade Stalin personally directed the investigation of Kirov's assassination. He questioned Nikolayev at length. The leaders of the Opposition placed the gun in Nikolayev's hand!"

Other speakers duly rose to purge the Communist Party of any opposition: "The Central Committee must be pitiless—the Party must be purged... the record of every member must be scrutinized...." No one at the meeting mentioned the initial theory that fascist agents had been responsible for the assassination. Barmine asserts Stalin even used the Kirov assassination to eliminate the remainder of the Opposition leadership, accusing Grigory Zinoviev, Lev Kamenev, Abram Prigozhin, and others who had stood with Kirov in opposing Stalin, or who had simply failed to acquiesce to Stalin's views, of being "morally responsible" for Kirov's murder, and therefore guilty of complicity. Barmine claimed that Stalin arranged the murder with the Soviet secret police, the NKVD, who armed Nikolayev and sent him to assassinate Kirov.

=== Investigations by Soviet authorities ===
In his Secret Speech in 1956, Khrushchev said that the murder of Kirov was organized by NKVD agents who were tasked with protecting Kirov and were shot in 1937. Khrushchev entrusted Pyotr Pospelov, Secretary of the Central Committee, to form a commission to investigate the repression of the 1930s. This was the same Pospelov who had drafted the famous Secret Speech for Khrushchev at the 20th Congress. Khrushchev stated:

There are reasons for the suspicion that the killer of Kirov, Nikolayev, was assisted by someone from among the people whose duty it was to protect the person of Kirov. A month and a half before the killing, Nikolayev was arrested on the grounds of suspicious behavior, but he was released and not even searched. It is an unusually suspicious circumstance that when the Chekist [Borisov] assigned to protect Kirov was being brought for an interrogation, on 2 December 1934, he was killed in a car "accident" in which no other occupants of the car were harmed. After the murder of Kirov, top functionaries of the Leningrad NKVD were relieved of their duties and were given very light sentences, but in 1937 they were shot. We can assume that they were shot in order to cover the traces of the organizers of Kirov's killing.

Pospelov's committee came to the conclusion that Kirov’s murder was facilitated by NKVD officers who were responsible for his security, and that NKVD chief Genrikh Yagoda was declared a hero, instead of holding him responsible. Pospelov spoke to Dr. Kirchakov and former nurse Trunina, former members of the party, who had been mentioned in a letter by another member of the commission, Olga Shatunovskaya, as having knowledge of the Kirov murder. Kirchakov confirmed that he talked to Shatunovskaya and Trunina about some of the unexplained aspects of the Kirov murder case and agreed to provide the commission with a written deposition. He stressed that his statement was based on the testimony of one Comrade Yan Olsky, a former NKVD officer who was demoted after Kirov's murder and transferred to the People's Supply System.

In his deposition, Kirchakov wrote that he had discussed Kirov's murder and the role of Fyodor Medved with Olsky. Olsky was of the firm opinion that Medved, Kirov's friend and NKVD security chief of the Leningrad branch, was innocent of the murder. Olsky also told Kirchakov that Medved had been barred from the NKVD Kirov assassination investigation. Instead, the investigation was carried out by a senior NKVD chief, Yakov Agranov, and later by another NKVD bureau officer whose name he did not remember.

The other NKVD official may have been Yefim Georgievich Yevdokimov (1891–1939), a Stalin crony, mass-killing specialist, and architect of the Shakhty purge trials, who continued to lead a secret police team within the NKVD even after technically retiring from the OGPU in 1931. During one of the committee sessions, Olsky said he was present when Stalin asked Leonid Nikolayev why Comrade Kirov had been killed. To this Nikolayev replied that he carried out the instruction of the "Chekists" (meaning the NKVD) and pointed towards the group of "Chekists" (NKVD officers) standing in the room. Medved was not among them.

Khrushchev's 1956 report, "On the Cult of Personality and Its Consequences", was later read at closed-door Party meetings. Afterwards, new material was received by the Pospelov Committee, including the assertion by Kirov's chauffeur, Kuzin, that Commissar Borisov, Kirov's friend and bodyguard, who was responsible for Kirov's round-the-clock security at the Smolny Institute, was intentionally killed, and that his death in a road accident was not an accident at all.

In 1989, the last attempt in the Soviet Union to review the Kirov murder case was made by the Politburo Commission headed by Alexander Nikolaevich Yakovlev. After two years of investigations, the working team of the Commission concluded that no materials were found to support Stalin's or NKVD's participation in Kirov's murder. Yakovlev dissented, noticing that a number of circumstances indicated the murder was organized by the NKVD. According to Amy Knight, the Politburo Commission tried to whitewash Stalin.

=== Significance and responsibility ===
Kirov's assassination became a major event in the history of the Soviet Union because it was used by Stalin to justify the Moscow trials and his campaign of terror known as the Great Purge. At the time of Kirov's murder, Maxim Litvinov, the Soviet Foreign Minister, was out of the country. His daughter Tanya implied that Litvinov realised this event might be an excuse for Stalin to unleash a reign of terror.

This view was shared by Anastas Mikoyan's son, who stated that the murder of Kirov had certain similarities to the burning of the Reichstag in Nazi Germany in 1933. The fire at the Reichstag was often said to have been organized by the Nazis as a pretext for the mass persecution of the Communists and Social Democrats in Germany. The physical removal of Kirov meant the elimination of a future potential rival for Stalin. The principal objective, as with the fire at the Reichstag, was to manufacture an excuse for repression and control. Based on circumstantial evidence, a number of historians concluded that the assassination was ordered by Stalin.

According to Orlov, Stalin ordered Yagoda to arrange the assassination of Kirov. Orlov said that Yagoda ordered Medved's deputy, Vania Zaporozhets, to undertake the job. Zaporozhets returned to Leningrad in search of an assassin. In reviewing the files he found the name of Leonid Nikolayev. According to another Soviet defector, Grigori Tokaev, a real oppositionist underground group assassinated Kirov. Author and Menshevik scholar Boris Nikolaevsky argued: "One thing is certain: the only man who profited by the Kirov assassination was Stalin."

The idea of Stalin's complicity in Kirov's assassination has been backed by Robert Conquest and Amy Knight but challenged by revisionist historians who argued that this theory relies primarily on circumstantial evidence and Khrushchev-era investigations. Robert W. Thurston argued that Kirov was in agreement with Stalin on all major issues and that on the Seventeenth Party Congress, at least 86.5% of voting delegates were in favour of Stalin's membership of the Central Committee. Hence, Stalin had little to fear from Kirov. Nothing in Nikolaev's personal diary indicates that he did not carry out the assassination on his own.

Alla Kirilina and Oleg Khlevniuk went as far as to claim that "the conventional narratives are almost entirely myth" because they did not find any orders of assassination in the former Soviet archives. Edvard Radzinsky argued in his biography of Stalin that written documents about Stalin ordering the assassination of Kirov were never found, simply because they never existed and could not exist. Radzinsky believes that Stalin was behind the assassination, but given the prominent status of Kirov as a Politburo member, it would have been ordered verbally by Stalin to NKVD director Genrikh Yagoda.

== Legacy ==
Many cities, streets, and factories were named or renamed after Kirov in Russia, including the cities of Kirov (formerly Vyatka) and Kirov Oblast, Kirovsk (Murmansk Oblast), Kirov (Kaluga Oblast), Kirovohrad (formerly Zinovyevsk, now Kropyvnytskyi) and Kirovohrad Oblast (Ukrainian SSR; now Ukraine), Kirovabad (Azerbaijani SSR; now Ganja, Azerbaijan), Kirovakan (Armenian SSR; now Vanadzor, Armenia), the Kirovskaya station of the Moscow Metro (now Chistye Prudy station), the Kirov Ballet (now the Mariinsky Ballet), the massive Kirov Plant in Saint Petersburg, Kirov Square in Yekaterinburg, the Kirov Islands in the Kara Sea, and various small settlements.

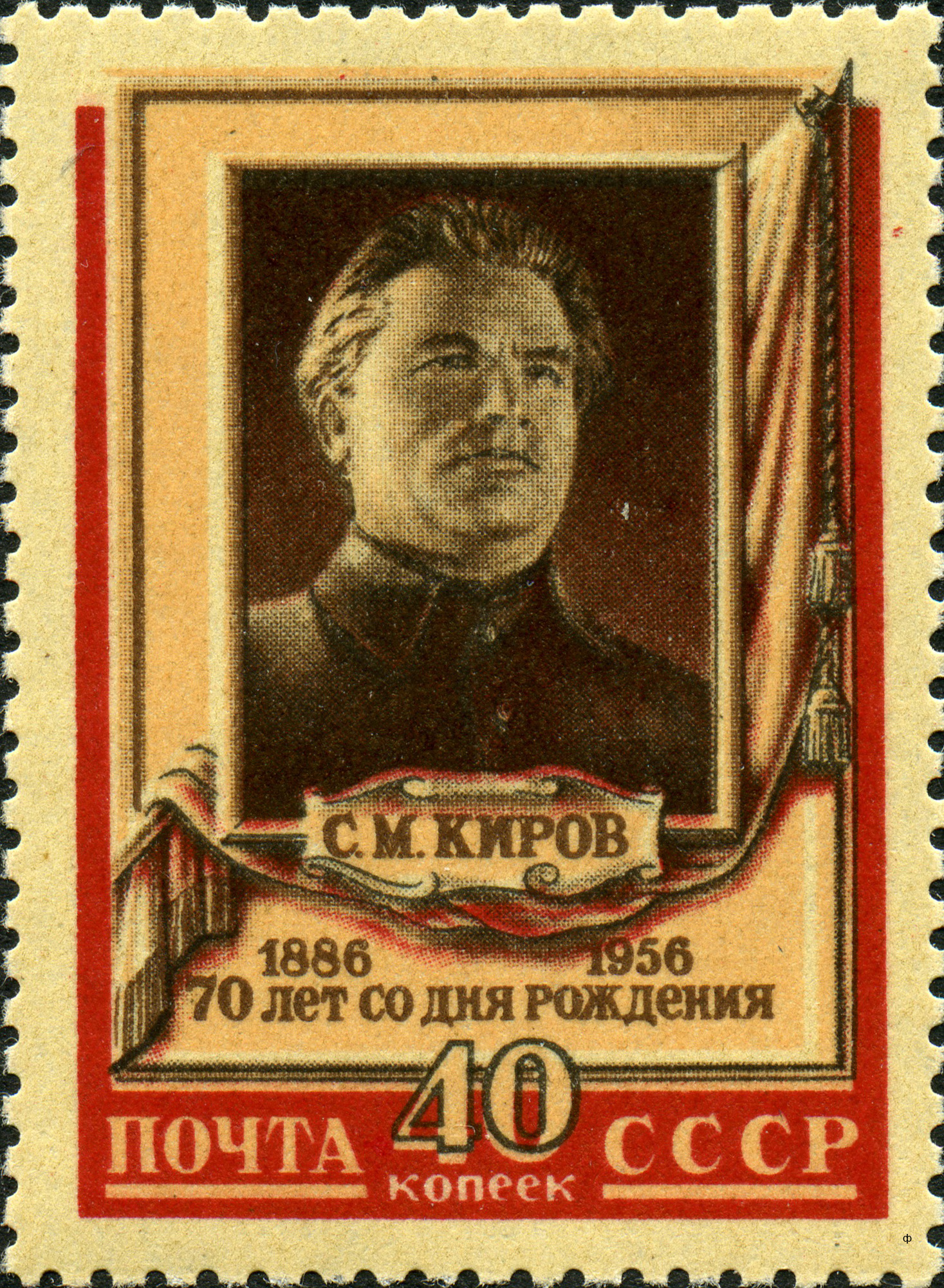
Kirov on a 1956 Soviet stamp

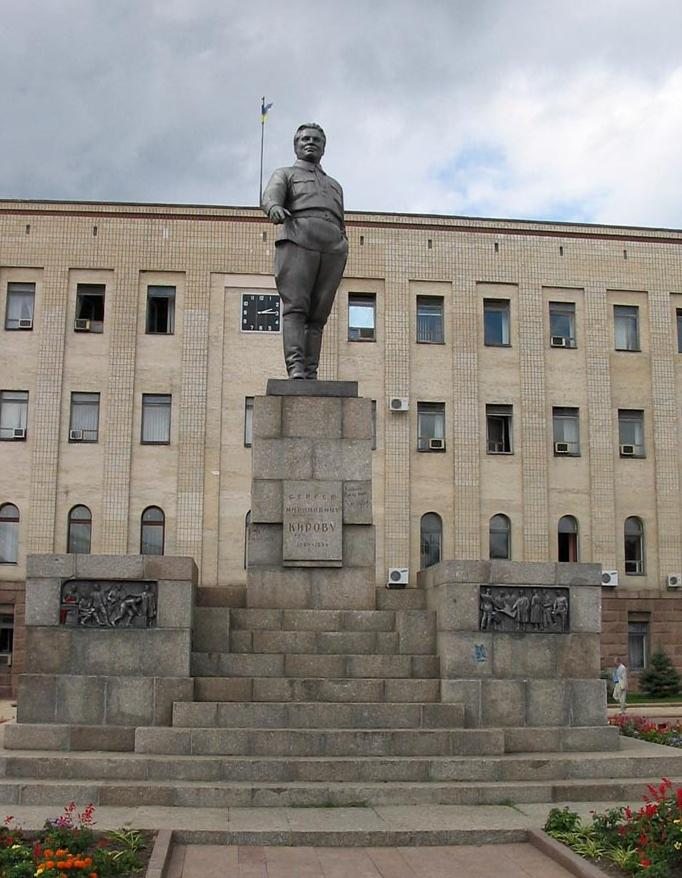
Monument to Kirov in Kropyvnytskyi, Ukraine, formerly known as Kirovhrad. The monument was removed in 2014.

Since the dissolution of the Soviet Union in 1991, many of the locations and buildings named after Kirov have been renamed, especially outside of Russia. In order to comply with Ukrainian decommunization laws, Kirovohrad was renamed Kropyvnytskyi by the Ukrainian Parliament in July 2016. In 2019, the Constitutional Court of Ukraine approved the change of the oblast's name to Kropyvnytskyi Oblast, or Kropyvnychchyna.

The S. M. Kirov Forestry Academy in Leningrad was named after him, and renamed the Saint Petersburg State Forest Technical University. For many years, a huge granite and bronze statue of Kirov dominated the city of Baku, the capital of Azerbaijan, erected on a hill in 1939. The statue was dismantled in January 1992, shortly after Azerbaijan gained its independence.

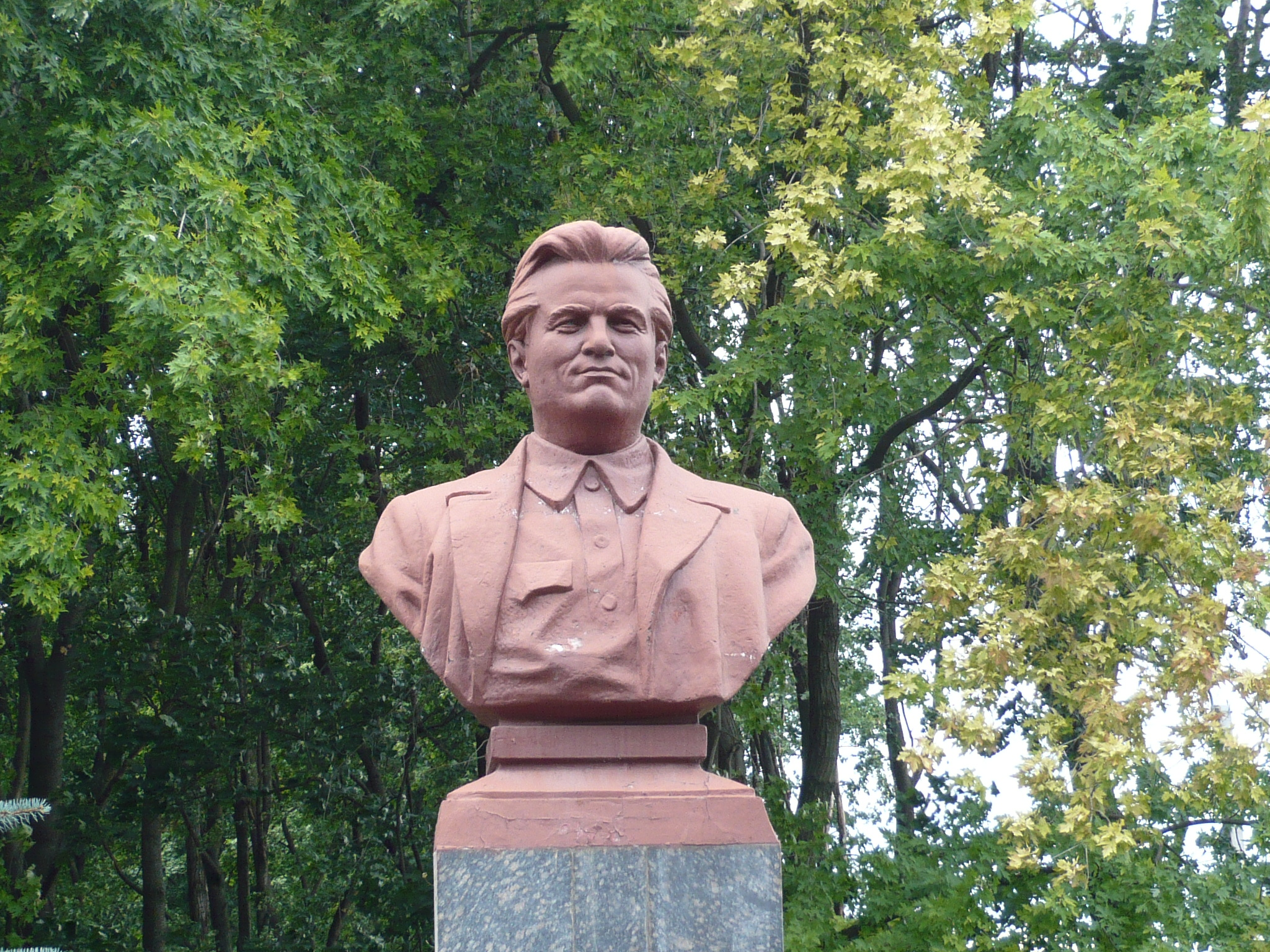
A bust of Kirov in Enerhetychna street, Kharkiv. It was removed in 2016.

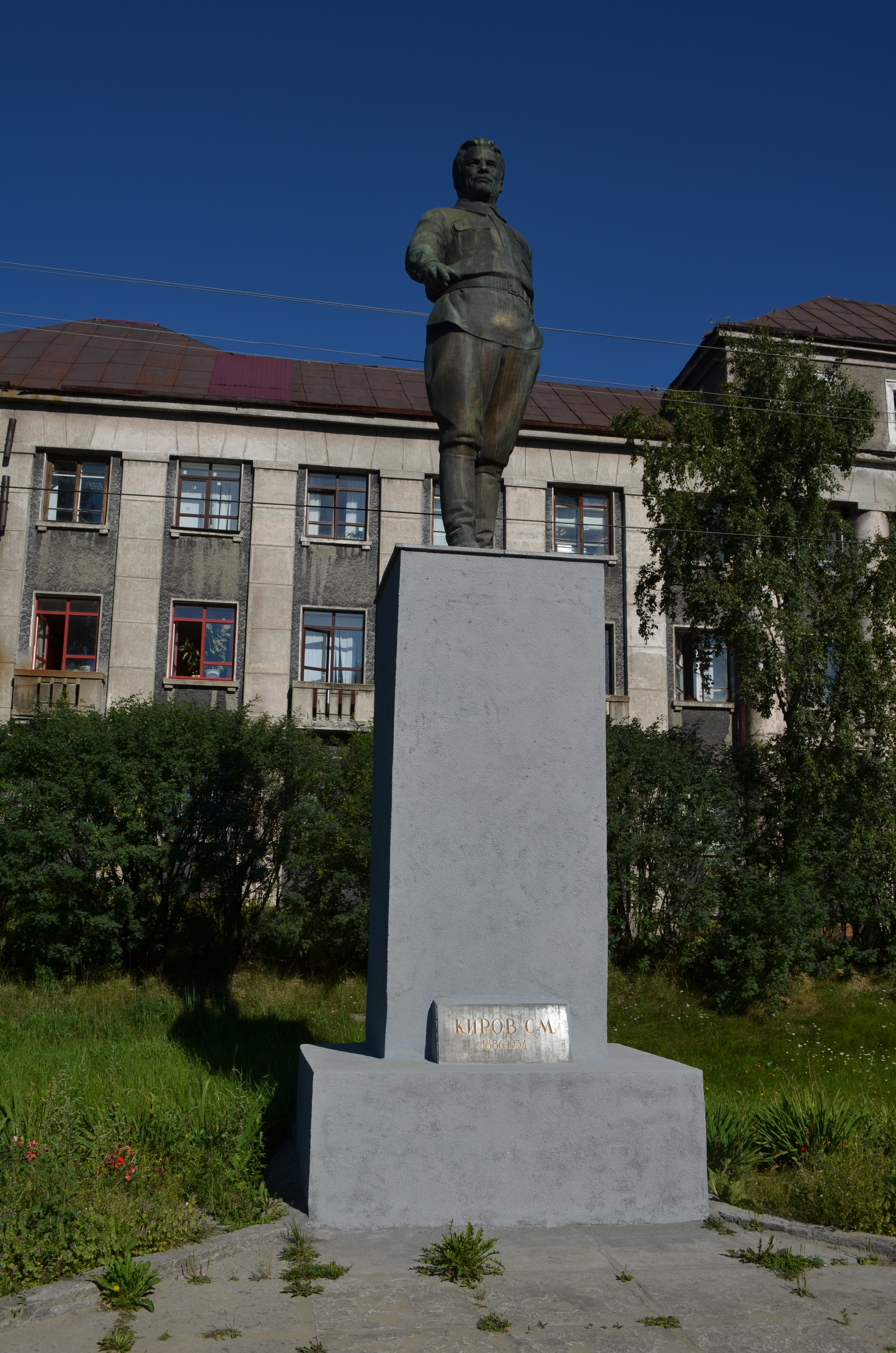
A monument to Kirov in Medvezhyegorsk, Russia.

The Kirov Prize, a speedskating match in the city of Kirov, was named for him. The Kirov Prize is the oldest annual organised race in speedskating, apart from the World Speed Skating Championships and the European Speed Skating Championships. The English communist poet John Cornford wrote an eponymous poem in his honour.

The Soviet Navy cruiser Kirov was named after him, and by extension the Kirov-class cruiser. The Kirov name was used for the battlecruiser Kirov and the Kirov-class battlecruiser. The Khai-3 tailless airplane was named after him.

== Personal life ==
Kirov was married to Maria Lvovna Markus (1885–1945) from 1911, although they never formally registered their relationship. Yevgenia Kostrikova (1921–1975), who claimed to be Kirov's daughter, was a famous tank company commander and World War II veteran.

== Honours and awards ==
- Order of Lenin
- Order of the Red Banner

== See also ==
- Outline of the Russian Revolution and Civil War
- Bibliography of the Russian Revolution and Civil War
- Bibliography of Stalinism and the Soviet Union
- Index of Old Bolsheviks
- Index of articles related to the Russian Revolution and Civil War
- Kremlin Plot
- Red Terror

== Cited sources ==
- Barmine, Alexander (1945). One Who Survived. New York: G.P. Putnam's Sons.
- Lenoe, Matthew E. (2010). The Kirov Murder and Soviet History (ePub ed.). Yale University Press. ISBN 978-0-300-11236-8.

Party political offices
Preceded by Grigory Kaminsky	First Secretary of the Azerbaijan Communist Party; 1921–1926	Succeeded by Levon Mirzoyan
