= Ivan Zaporozhets =

Soviet politician (1885–1937)

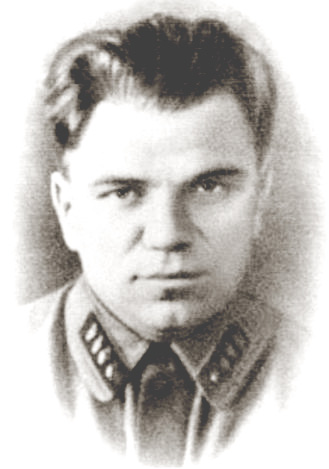
Ivan Zaporozhets

Ivan Vasilevich Zaporozhets (Russian: Иван Васильевич Запорожец; Ukrainian: Іван Васильович Запорожець; 6 January 1895 – 14 August 1937) was a Ukrainian Soviet security officer and official of the OGPU-NKVD who was suspected of being involved in the assassination of Sergei Kirov in Leningrad in December 1934.

== Career ==
Zaporozhets was born in Berdyansk, in Ukraine, the son of a zemstvo agronomist. He was a member of the Ukrainian Party of Socialist Revolutionaries (SRs) from his student years. He was drafted in to Imperial Russian Army in 1915 and was captured and held as a prisoner of war by the Austria-Hungary. Released after the Treaty of Brest-Litovsk, he returned to Kherson, rejoined the Left SRs, and in spring 1919, he took part Ataman Nykyfor Hryhoriv's revolt against Bolshevik rule in Ukraine. But he also fought as a partisan against the White Army of General Denikin. In May 1920, when the Left SRs merged with the Communist Party, Zaporozhets joined the Communist Party of Ukraine.

From 1921 to 1927, he worked for the Foreign Department of the Joint State Political Directorate (OGPU) in Austria and Germany. In March 1931, he was appointed deputy head of the Secret Political Department. In 1932, he was transferred to Leningrad as deputy head of the regional OGPU. He brought in his own staff from Moscow, and was known to act independently of his nominal department head, Filipp Medved. In August 1934, he broke several bones during a fall from a horse, and was recuperating at the time of the Kirov murder.

== Murder of Sergei Kirov ==
Zaporozhets was first publicly accused of complicity in the murder of Sergei Kirov during the third Moscow Show Trial in March 1938. The story told there was that some time before the assassination – and presumably before Zaporozhets's accident – the assassin, Leonid Nikolayev, was caught by security guards carrying a gun and a map of the route Kirov normally took at party headquarters. Genrikh Yagoda 'confessed' that when Zaporozhets reported this incident to him, he and when Yagoda confessed that he was "compelled to instruct Zaporozhets not to place any obstacles in the way of the terrorist act against Kirov", and so Nikolayev was released and allowed to make a second attempt. Zaporozhets was also accused of organising the murder of Kirov's bodyguard, Borisov, "a dangerous witness", who died in a road accident on the day after Kirov's murder.

The person who supposedly 'compelled' Yagoda to be a party to the murder was Avel Yenukidze. According to Yagoda, Yenukidze "insisted" that Kirov had to die. That detail was definitively discredited in 1960, when Yenudkidze was rehabilitated and posthumously readmitted to the communist party, but the suspicion remained that some of the details given in court were true - with the crucial difference that the person doing the compelling and insisting was Joseph Stalin. The historian of the Great Purge, Robert Conquest observed: "If anyone in Soviet political life was totally unqualified to insist on anything, it was Yenukidze ... If we were to substitute for him the name of a man who was in a position to insist, we should not have to look far." The NKVD officer, Alexander Orlov, who defected to the west, suspected it was true, because of the lenient treatment Zaporozhets was given while he was in the Gulag.

== Later career ==
Zaporozhets returned to Leningrad in time for Kirov's funeral, after which he was arrested and accused of negligence. On 23 January 1935, he was sentenced to three years in the Gulag, where he was treated as a trustee in charge of other prisoners. Senior officers still based in Moscow sent him records and radio sets. His wife was allowed to accompany him, and his third child, a girl, was born in Magadan in July 1935.

Zaporozhets was recalled from Kolyma to Moscow and rearrested on 1 May 1937, when the head of the NKVD, Nikolai Yezhov, ordered a purge of officers who had held senior positions under his predecessor, Genrikh Yagoda. In June, he confessed to having been part of a 'right wing conspiracy' involving Yagoda and the commander of the Leningrad military district, Ivan Belov. His name was on a list of 25 former officers or their family members, including Leopold Averbakh and Karl Pauker, who were executed on 14 August 1937.

His wife, Vera Zaporozhets, was arrested in 1937, and sentenced to 10 years in prison. She was arrested again in 1951.

== In literature ==
Zaporozhets appears as a character in the novel Children of the Arbat, by Anatoly Rybakov. where he is described as "tall and broad-shouldered, a wit and a joker who loved good wines and women and sang well."
