= Robert Thurston =

Robert Thurston may refer to:

- Robert Thurston (novelist) (1936–2021), American science fiction writer
- Robert W. Thurston (born 1949), American historian and author
- Robert Henry Thurston (1839–1903), American engineer
