= Syndicate–2 =

"Syndicate–2" was a disinformation operation developed and carried out by the State Political Directorate, aimed at eliminating Savinkov's anti-Soviet underground.

== Background ==
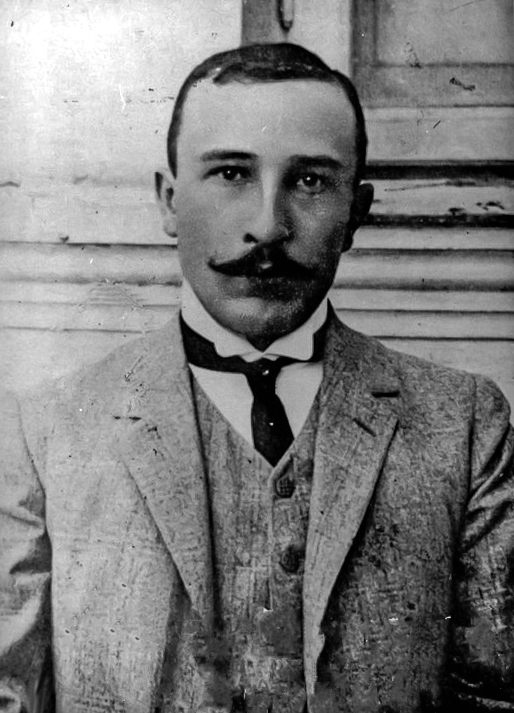
Boris Savinkov

The interest of the famous terrorist Boris Savinkov to participate in underground anti–Soviet activities prompted the extraordinary commissioners to develop a plan to involve him in such activities under the supervision of special services, to eliminate the entire underground network. Such a plan was developed in the Counterintelligence Department of the State Political Administration under the People's Commissariat of Internal Affairs of the Russian Socialist Federative Soviet Republic, created in 1922. On May 12, 1922, a circular letter "On the Savinkov's Organization" was issued (it was published on the fourth day of the department's existence and became the first circular letter published). This letter addressed the issue of a new method of counterintelligence work – the creation of legendary organizations. Operation Syndicate–2 was carried out in parallel with a similar Operation Trust, aimed at liquidating the monarchist underground. Operation Syndicate–2 involved the head of the Counterintelligence Division Artur Artuzov, Deputy Chief Roman Pilar, Assistant Chief Sergei Puzitskiy and the personnel of the 6th Division of the Counterintelligence Division: Chief Ignatiy Sosnovskiy, Assistant Chief Nikolai Demidenko, secret officer Andrey Fedorov, authorized Grigory Syroezhkin, Semyon Gendin, Assistant to the Authorized Counterintelligence Department of the Plenipotentiary Representation of the State Political Administration for the Western Territory, Jan Krikman.

After the failure of the resistance in Poland and a series of failures in the anti–Soviet field, Boris Savinkov decided to single–handedly organize uprisings and terrorist acts in Russia, reviving the People's Union for the Defense of the Motherland and Freedom. While in Paris, in the summer of 1922, he sent his adjutant Leonid Sheshenya to Russia, where he was detained by Soviet border guards while crossing the border from Poland. Through Sheshenya (who was under the threat of being shot for participating in Balakhovich's formations and agreed to cooperate with the United State Political Directorate), the extraordinary commissioners managed to uncover two agents – Mikhail Zekunov and V. Gerasimov, who turned out to be the leader of an underground organization. Also, on the basis of Sheshenya's testimony, the cells of the People's Union for the Defense of the Motherland and Freedom in the Western Territory were liquidated.

== Introduction to emigration ==
In the Counterintelligence Department, a project was developed according to which secret officer Andrei Fedorov should go abroad under the guise of a member of the Central Committee of the Liberal Democrats Party, Andrei Mukhin, to convince Savinkov of the existence of a capable underground organization in the Soviet Union and persuade him to cooperate. In addition, the extraordinary commissioners managed to recruit Zekunov, arrested in September 1922, who, after a month of briefing, was sent to Poland, where he met with Sheshenya's relative, a member of the People's Union for the Defense of the Motherland and Freedom, Ivan Fomichev. Fomichev sent Zekunov to Warsaw, where he reported to the resident of Savinkov, Dmitry Filosofov, the information that Sheshenya had come into contact with a large counter–revolutionary organization in the Soviet State, and handed over a letter to Sheshenya addressed to Savinkov. In June 1923, Fedorov went to Poland. In Vilno, he met with Ivan Fomichev, with whom they went to Warsaw. Fedorov demanded a meeting with Savinkov, in which he was denied (as envisaged by the extraordinary commissioners), instead Filosofov talked with him. Filosofov was suspicious of Fedorov, but he listened to his statement, and decided to send Fomichev to the Soviet Union for reconnaissance, which he informed Savinkov about in a letter. Savinkov approved the decision of his resident.

Fomichev, who arrived in Moscow, was first set up by extraordinary commissioners with a real counter–revolutionary, Professor Isachenko, who headed a monarchist organisation, in the hope that the political opponents would quarrel and Fomichev would get the impression that the only force with which to cooperate was the "Liberal Democrats". And so it happened, after this conversation, Fomichev got to a meeting of the joint center of "Liberal Democrats" and Savinkovites, where he made a proposal for cooperation (Professor Isachenko was sent to the Internal Prison of the State Political Administration on Lubyanka, and, apparently, was shot). The "Liberal Democrats" accepted the proposal to work together, but set a condition for political consultations with Savinkov personally. The information received from Fomichev was accepted by Filosofov with enthusiasm, and he even forgot to inform Savinkov himself about it, who learned about the result of the trip by accident. Savinkov was very angry at this behavior of the residents, and threatened to remove all local leaders of the Union. He was in thought, comparing all the known facts, studying the program documents of the Liberal Democrats Party, which were drawn up with the participation of Artuzov, Puzitsky and Menzhinsky.

Meanwhile, on June 11, 1923, Fedorov went to Paris from Warsaw to meet with Savinkov. Savinkov was still not sure that the Liberal Democrats were not a provocation by the extraordinary commissioners, and decided to send one of his closest associates, Sergei Pavlovsky, to Fedorov, who suspected that the organization was provocative in nature. However, the check failed, Fedorov did not succumb to the provocation, and achieved an audience with Savinkov, playing a scene of a quarrel over resentment and disappointment in Savinkov and his associates. Savinkov calmed Fedorov, and sent Pavlovsky to the Soviet Union (without giving details of the leadership of the Liberal Democrats). In addition, Fomichev and Fedorov contacted Polish intelligence, passed on some false information (prepared by the State Political Administration) and agreed on permanent cooperation.

== Savinkov's arrest ==
Pavlovsky arrived in Poland in August 1923, illegally crossed the border with the Soviet Union on August 17, killing a Red Army soldier, but instead of immediately proceeding to check the activities of Sheshenya, Zekunov and others, in Belarus he organized an armed group from among the members of the People's Union for the Defense of the Motherland and freedoms, along with which he began to deal with the expropriation of banks, mail trains and the murder of communists. On September 16, he moved to Moscow, where two days later, during a meeting with Sheshenya and the leaders of the Liberal Democrats, he was arrested and taken to the internal prison of the State Political Administration. There he was presented with a list of his most important crimes and made it clear that he would only be able to avoid execution by cooperating with the State Political Administration. He was asked to write a letter to Filosofov, and he agreed, having an agreement with Savinkov, that if he did not put an end to any proposal in the letter, it would be a sign that he was arrested. But the attempt to send a letter with a conditional sign failed, since Pavlovsky, with his persistent interest in whether the emergency commissioners were not afraid that Savinkov would learn about the arrest of his assistant, aroused their suspicions, and a secret technique was unraveled by the cipher clerks. The letter was forced to be rewritten. Savinkov, having received a letter without a secret sign, trusted Pavlovsky and wrote a message to the Liberal Democrats in which he expressed a desire to come to Russia. Savinkov's wish was that Pavlovsky should come to Europe for him, but the extraordinary commissioners could not let Pavlovsky go, and they invented the legend that he allegedly went to the south of Russia with the aim of expropriation, was wounded and bedridden. Such news confused Savinkov, planting suspicions in his mind, but they were discarded, since Savinkov was driven by the fear of being late at the right moment for active action. In addition, the extraordinary commissioners organized meetings of Fomichev with the "leaders of anti–Soviet groups" in Rostov–on–Don and Mineralnye Vody, who were represented by officers of the Counterintelligence Department Ibragim Abyssalov and Ignatiy Sosnovsky. In June 1924, Fomichev arrived in Paris and convinced Savinkov of the need for a trip.

In August 1924, Savinkov returned to the Soviet Union, accompanied by Alexander Dikhoff, his wife Lyubov, Fomichev and Fedorov. Fedorov separated from the group in Vilno, promising to meet them on Soviet territory. On August 15, they crossed the border through a passage prepared by the United State Political Administration. They reached Minsk, where Savinkov, and Alexander and Lyubov Dikgof, betrayed by Andrei Fedorov, were arrested in a safe house on August 16, 1924, and sent to Moscow. On August 18, they were taken to the inner prison of the United State Political Administration.

== Trial, imprisonment and death of Savinkov ==
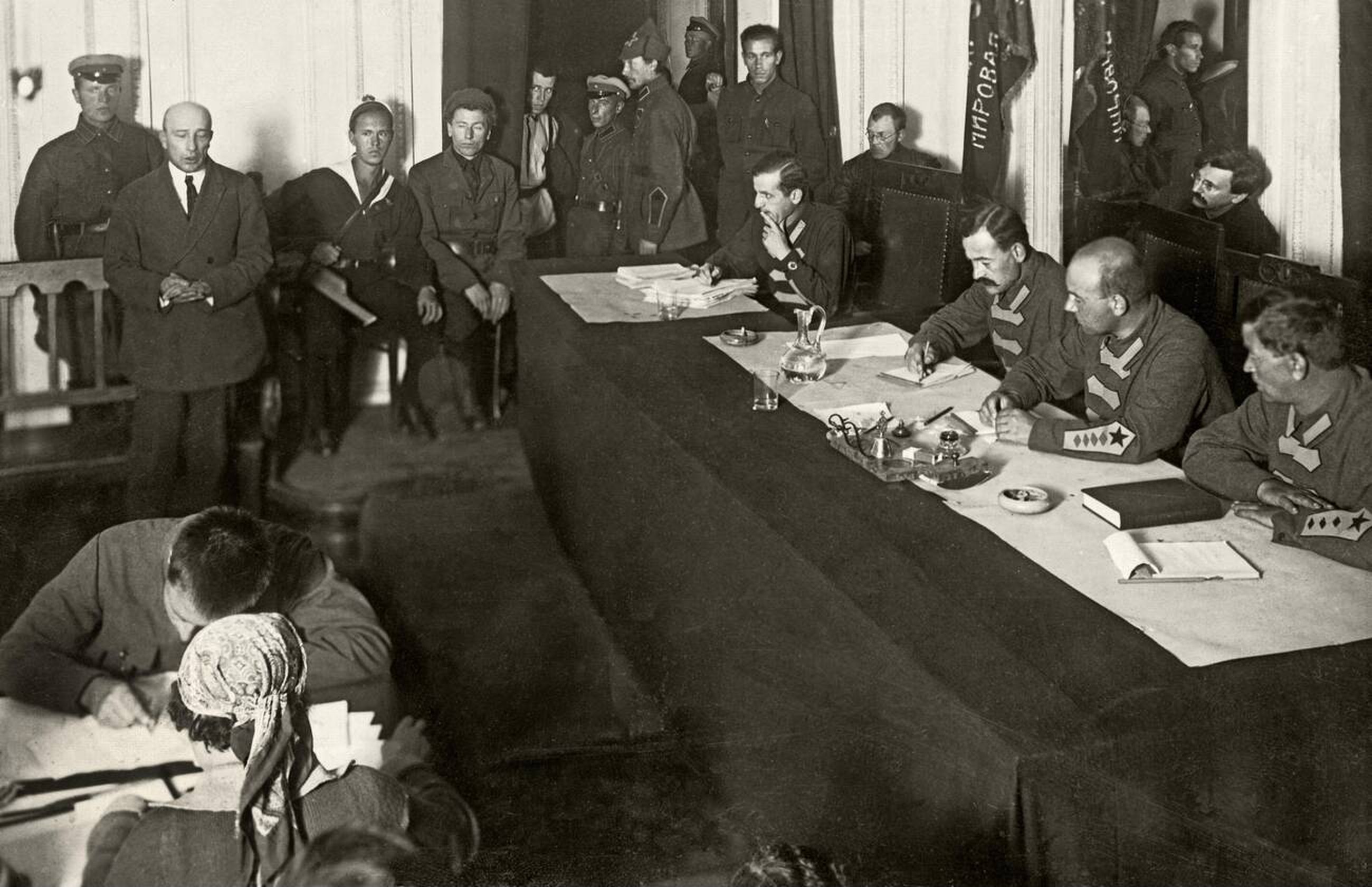
The trial of Savinkov

At the trial Savinkov confessed to everything and especially noted the fact that "all his life he worked only for the people and in their name". Cooperating with the investigation, he presented at the trial the version invented by the extraordinary commissioners to keep the details of Operation Syndicate–2 secret, and stated that he repented of his crimes and admitted "all his political activities since the October Socialist Revolution were a mistake and delusion". On August 29, 1924, the Supreme Court sentenced Savinkov to death with confiscation of property, since he deserved five years in prison and five death sentences for the cumulative crimes. However, the court petitioned for a mitigation of the sentence due to the convicted person's admission of his guilt and his readiness to make amends to the Soviet authorities. The motion of the Military Collegium of the Supreme Court was approved by the Presidium of the Central Executive Committee of the Soviet Union, and the capital punishment was replaced by imprisonment for a term of ten years.

Being in the internal prison of the United State Political Administration on Lubyanka, in unprecedented conditions (in the cell where his mistress Lyubov Dikhoff lived with him periodically, there was a carpet, furniture, the prisoner was allowed to write memoirs, some of which were even published, and he was paid a fee), Savinkov kept a diary in which he continued to insist on a fictional version of the motives for crossing the border. On the morning of May 7, 1925, Savinkov wrote a letter to Felix Dzerzhinsky, in which he asked to explain why he was being held in prison, and not shot or not allowed to work for the Soviet regime. Dzerzhinsky did not answer in writing, only ordering to convey that he started talking about freedom early. In the evening of that day, employees of the United State Political Administration Speransky, Puzitsky and Syroezhkin accompanied Savinkov for a walk in Tsaritsinsky Park, three hours later they returned to Lubyanka, to Pillar's office on the fifth floor to wait for the guards. At some point, Puzitsky left the office, in which there was Speransky, sitting on the sofa, Syroezhkin, sitting at the table, and Savinkov.

Researchers have not yet come to a consensus about further events. The official version says that Savinkov paced the room and suddenly jumped out of the window into the courtyard. However, the investigator conducting the official investigation notes that Savinkov was sitting at a round table opposite one of the emergency commissioners. Boris Gudz, a close friend of Syroezhkin, who was at that moment in the next room, in the 90s said that Savinkov walked around the room and jumped through the window upside down, Syroezhkin managed to catch him by the leg, but he could not hold back, as he had an injury to one of his hands. For the first time, a message about Savinkov's suicide, written in the United State Political Administration, edited by Felix Dzerzhinsky and approved by Joseph Stalin, was published on May 13 in the newspaper Pravda. The suicide version was circulated by the Soviet press and part of the émigré community. Doubts about the official version were one of the first to be expressed by Alexander Solzhenitsyn in the Archipelago of the Main Administration of the Camps. He wrote that in the Kolyma Camp, the former extraordinary commissioner Arthur Prubel, dying, told someone that he was one of four people who threw Savinkov out of the window. Some modern historians are also inclined to believe that Savinkov was killed.

== Operation results ==
During the operation "Syndicate–2", most of the "Savinkovites" were identified, conducting clandestine work on the territory of the Soviet Union, the "People's Union for the Defense of the Motherland and Freedom" was finally defeated: the cells of the "Union" were liquidated in Smolensk, Bryansk, Vitebsk, Gomel Provinces, on the territory of the Petrograd Military District, 23 Savinkov's residencies in Moscow, Samara, Saratov, Kharkov, Kiev, Tula, Odessa. There have been several major trials, including the "Case of Forty–Four", "Case of Twelve", "Case of Forty–Three". Agents of the People's Union for the Defense of the Motherland and Freedom Veselov, Gorelov, Nagel–Neiman, Rosselevich, the organizers of the terrorist acts V. I. Svezhevsky and Mikhail Gnilorybov and others were arrested and convicted. Alexander and Lyubov Dikhoff were amnestied and lived in Moscow until 1936, when they were sentenced to 5 years in a forced labor camp as "socially dangerous elements", they ended up in the Kolyma. There, in 1939, Alexander Arkadyevich was shot. Lyubov Efimovna survived, settled in exile in Magadan, and worked as a librarian. She died in Mariupol in 1969. Pavlovsky was shot in 1924, Sheshenya worked for the United State Political Administration, and was shot in 1937, Fomichev was released, lived in the village, was shot in 1929.

Vyacheslav Menzhinsky, Roman Pillar, Sergei Puzitsky, Nikolai Demidenko, Andrey Fedorov, Grigory Syroezhkin were presented with the Order of the Red Banner. Artur Artuzov, Ignatiy Sosnovsky, Semyon Gendin and I. P. Krikman received gratitude from the government of the Soviet Union.

Subsequently, almost all the extraordinary commissioners who participated in the operation were shot during the Stalinist Purges: Andrei Fedorov, in the organs of the All–Russian Extraordinary Commission since 1920, one of the main participant in the Syndicate–2 operation and the capture of Boris Savinkov (disguised as officer Mukhin), shot on September 20, 1937, in Moscow. Roman Pillar, Sergei Puzitsky, Artur Artuzov, Ignatiy Sosnovsky were shot in 1937. Grigory Syroezhkin and Semyon Gendin – in 1939.

== Operation Syndicate–2 in culture ==
Based on the operation in 1968, the novel "Retribution" was written by the writer Vasily Ardamatsky. In the same year, according to a script based on the novel "Retribution", the film "Crash" was shot by director Vladimir Chebotaryov. In 1981, director Mark Orlov filmed a remake of the six–part television movie "Syndicate–2". An operation similar to Syndicate–2 is also at the heart of the 2014 television series Wolf Sun, which chronicles the activities of Soviet intelligence in Poland in the 1920s.

== See also ==
- Operation Trust
- Operation Maki Mirage
- Tagantsev conspiracy

== Sources ==
- Syndicate / Vladimir Khaustov // Great Russian Encyclopedia: In 35 Volumes / Editor–In–Chief Yury Osipov – Moscow: Great Russian Encyclopedia, 2004–2017
