= Vasiliy Ulrikh =

Soviet judge (1889–1951)

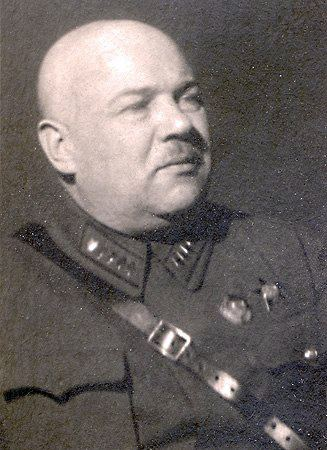
- Vasiliy Ulrikh c. 1930

Chairman of the Military Collegium of the Supreme Court of the Soviet Union
- In office 2 February 1926 – 25 August 1948
- Preceded by: Valentin Trifonov
- Succeeded by: Aleksandr Cheptsov

Personal details
- Born: Vasiliy Vasilievich Ulrikh; 13 July 1889 Riga, Governorate of Livonia, Russian Empire
- Died: 7 May 1951 (aged 61) Moscow, Russian SFSR, Soviet Union
- Citizenship: Soviet
- Party: Communist Party of the Soviet Union
- Education: Riga Technical University
- Occupation: Jurist

Vasiliy Vasilievich Ulrikh (Russian: Васи́лий Васи́льевич У́льрих; 13 July 1889 – 7 May 1951) was a senior judge of the Soviet Union during most of the regime of Joseph Stalin. Ulrikh served as the presiding judge at many of the major show trials of the Great Purges in the Soviet Union.

== Early life ==
Vasili Ulrikh was born in Riga, Latvia, then a part of the Russian Empire. His father was a Latvian revolutionary of German descent, and his mother was a Russian noblewoman. Because of their open involvement in revolutionary activity, the entire family was sentenced to a five-year period of internal exile in Irkutsk, Siberia.

In 1910, young Ulrikh returned to his native Riga and began to study at the Riga Polytechnical Institute. He joined the Bolshevik faction of the Russian Social Democratic Labour Party in the same year.

He graduated in 1914, and with the beginning of World War I he was sent to the front as an officer.

After the Bolshevik Revolution, Leon Trotsky secured him entrance into the Cheka. Ulrikh subsequently served on a number of military tribunals, and came to the attention of Stalin, who apparently liked the efficient way in which he carried out his duties and his terse, even laconic style of reporting these tribunals' actions.

== Career ==
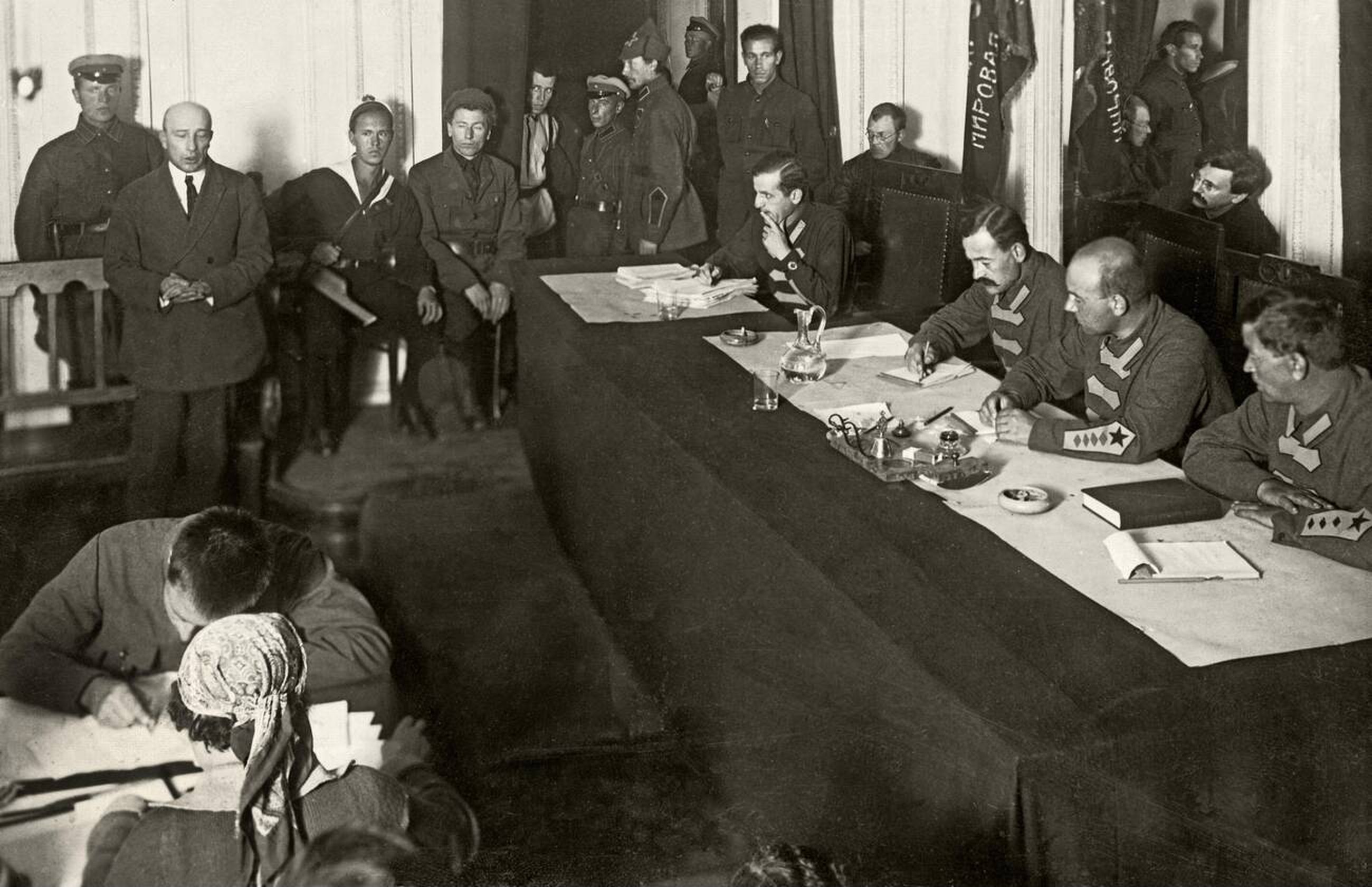
Vasiliy Ulrikh in 1924 as presiding judge at the trial of Boris Savinkov, seated at the table, second from the right

In 1926, Ulrikh became Chairman of the Military Collegium of the Supreme Court of the Soviet Union. It was in this capacity that he handed down the sentences of the Great Purge. Ulrikh sentenced Zinoviev, Kamenev, Bukharin, Tukhachevsky, Rodzaevsky, Beloborodov, Yezhov and many others. He attended the executions of many of these men, and occasionally performed executions himself. Ulrikh personally executed Yan Karlovich Berzin, former head of Red Army Intelligence Directorate, later called GRU.

During World War II, Ulrikh continued to hand down death sentences to people accused of sabotage and defeatism. He was also the chief judge during the Trial of the Sixteen leaders of the Polish Secret State and Home Army in 1945.

After the conclusion of the war, Ulrikh presided over a number of the early trials of the Zhdanovshchina.

In 1948, a number of top judges, including Ulrikh, were removed from their positions for severe drawbacks in the judicial system, including corruption and what were classified as political errors. Ulrikh was subsequently reassigned to be the course director at the Military Law Academy. He died of a heart attack on May 7, 1951, and was buried in the Novodevichy Cemetery in Moscow.

== Opinions ==
Anton Antonov-Ovseenko labeled him a "uniformed toad with watery eyes." Otto Tief, the last acting prime minister of Estonia before Soviet occupation, described Ulrikh as "a youthful, round-faced and plump blond man in a general's uniform, with a gentle smile on his face."

== Bibliography ==
- Anton Antonov-Ovseenko, The Time of Stalin
- Robert Conquest, The Great Terror: A Reassessment
- Amy Knight, Who Killed Kirov: The Kremlin's Greatest Mystery
- Aleksandr Solzhenitsyn, The Gulag Archipelago
- Arkady Vaksberg, Stalin's Prosecutor: The Life of Andrei Vyshinsky
- Dmitri Volkogonov, Stalin: Triumph and Tragedy
- Simon Sebag Montefiore, Stalin, Court of the Red Tsar
