= Alexei Panfilov =

Soviet military lieutenant-general (1898–1986)

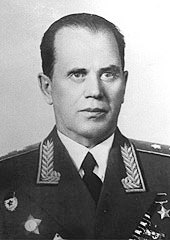
- Native name: Алексей Павлович Панфилов
- Born: 17 May 1898; Kazan, Russian Empire
- Died: 18 May 1968 (aged 70) Moscow, Russian SFSR, Soviet Union
- Buried: Novodevichy Cemetery
- Allegiance: Soviet Union
- Branch: Red Army (later Soviet Army)
- Rank: Lieutenant general of Tank Forces
- Commands: GRU; 6th Guards Tank Corps; 3rd Guards Tank Corps
- Conflicts: Russian Civil War; Battle of Lake Khasan; World War II
- Awards: Hero of the Soviet Union; Order of Lenin (2); Order of the Red Banner (5)

Alexei Pavlovich Panfilov (Russian: Алексей Павлович Панфилов; 17 May 1898 – 18 May 1968) was a Soviet lieutenant-general of the armored forces.

== Biography ==
Alexei Panfilov was born in Kazan in the family of a railway worker. In 1918 he joined the Red Army and the Communist Party. He joined the Red Army in 1918 participated in the Russian Civil War on the Eastern Front. In 1926, he graduated from the political department of the Advanced Courses for Senior Commanders at the Frunze Military Academy. In 1937, he graduated from the Military Academy of Mechanization and Motorization of the Red Army.

As a colonel, he commanded the 2nd Mechanized Brigade in the successful summer 1938 campaign against the Japanese on Lake Khasan. In 1939, Panfilov became deputy head of the directorate of armored forces of the Red Army. In 1940–1941 he was deputy head of the Intelligence Directorate of the General Staff (GRU) of the Red Army, and in 1941–1942 he served as head of this Directorate, which was transformed on February 16, 1942, by the order of the People's Commissar of Defense of the USSR into the Main Intelligence Directorate of the General Staff. At the same time, from October 1941 to August 1942, he was deputy chief of the General Staff and plenipotentiary for the formation of the Polish Army in the USSR.

At the end of August 1942, due to the departure of Anders' Army from the USSR, he was delegated to the front. He was deputy commander of the 3rd Tank Army and 5th Tank Army, then commanded the 6th Guards Tank Corps and the 10th Panzer Corps (October 1943 - April 1944). On March 11, 1944, he was promoted to lieutenant general. From August 1944 to May 1945, he commanded the 3rd Guards Tank Corps. For his actions in the Tricity area (including the defeat of the remnants of the German 2nd Army between Gdynia and Gdańsk) he was honored on May 29, 1945, with the title of Hero of the Soviet Union.

After the end of World War II, he commanded the 3rd Armored Division. In 1954, he completed a higher course at the General Staff Academy. He became the head of the plant at the Armored Forces Academy and a senior lecturer at the General Staff Academy. Transferred to the reserve in 1959. Panfilov died on May 18, 1966, and was buried at the Novodevichy Cemetery.

== Awards ==
=== Soviet ===
- Hero of the Soviet Union
- Order of Lenin (2)
- Order of the Red Banner (5)
- Order of Suvorov, first class and second class

=== Foreign awards ===
- Virtuti Militari (Poland)
- Dukel Commemorative Medal (Czechoslovakia)
- Czechoslovak War Cross 1939–1945 (Czechoslovakia).
