= Iosif Boyarsky =

Russian animator and director

- Born: Iosif Yakovlevich Boyarsky; November 7, 1917; Moscow
- Died: March 12, 2008 (aged 90); Moscow

Iosif Yakovlevich Boyarsky (November 7, 1917 – March 12, 2008) was a Russian animator and director, the longtime Director of the Model Animation Association of Soyuzmultfilm Studio, an award-winning Russian animation studio based in Moscow.

Boyarsky was born in Moscow on November 7, 1917, to Yacov Boyarsky and Anna Arluck. He graduated from the Economy Faculty of Gerasimov Institute of Cinematography, which is abbreviated as VGIK.

He first began working at Soyuzmultfilm in 1960. He worked as a director at the studio. He then became the director general of the Model Animation Association. Boyarsky later served as Soyuzmultfilm's Dean of Animation Faculty of the Higher Courses for Scriptwriters and Film Directors from 1979 until 2000. Under Boyarsky's guidance and direction, some of the Soviet Union's most well known animated works, such as 38 Parrots and Cheburashka, were created at Soyuzmultfilm.

Iosif Boyarsky died on March 12, 2008, in Moscow at the age of 90.

Russian animation film director Yuri Norstein spoke of Boyarsky's work at Soyuzmultfilm in an interview, "The flourishing of model animation in Soyuzmultfilm was undoubtedly related to the name of Iosif Yakovlevich. Boyarsky was an extremely jolly and optimistic person, and a very well-educated one. He was not a Communist Party member, and thus, was not engaged in all those things. It was thanks to him that the boldest and freshest ideas could be implemented in the model animation studio."
