= Lajos Magyar =

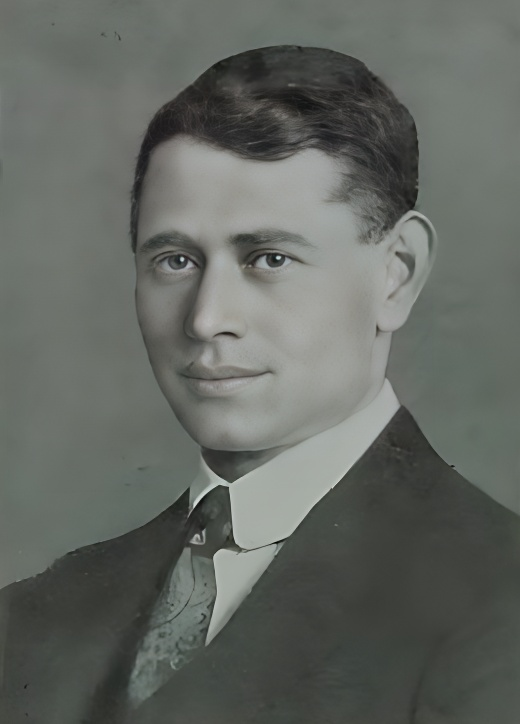
- Lajos Magyar

Member of the National Assembly of Soviets
- In office 1919–1919

Personal details
- Born: November 25, 1891 Istvándi, Austria-Hungary
- Died: November 2, 1937 (aged 45) Soviet Union
- Party: All-Union Communist Party (Bolsheviks) (1922–); Social Democratic Party of Hungary (1909–1910)
- Spouse: Péchy Blanka

Lajos Magyar (Russian: Людвиг Игнатьевич Мадьяр, romanized: Lyudvig Ignatyevich Madyar; 25 November 1891, Istvándi, Hungary – 2 November 1937, Moscow, Soviet Union) was a Hungarian Communist journalist and sinologist, active in the Hungarian Soviet Republic of 1919, after the fall of which he was imprisoned by the Horthy regime. In 1922 Magyar went to the Soviet Union as the result of an exchange of prisoners. There he worked on the staff of the Comintern and at the newspaper Pravda. Between 1926 and 1927 he was sent on a diplomatic mission to China. From 1929 to 1934 he served as deputy chief of the Oriental Secretariat of the Executive Committee of the Communist International.

In 1934, Magyar was falsely accused of being involved in the Kirov assassination; he was arrested and sentenced to prison convicted as a "Zinovievite-Terrorist". Magyar was sent to prison, where he ultimately perished. Some sources (like "Guidebook to the Pantheon of the Working-Class Movement of the Imre Mező Avenue Cemetery") report that Lajos Magyar died on July 17, 1940, however, recent research on Lajos Magyar, as well as some Russian databases of repressed people insist that Magyar was sentenced to death and shot on November 2, 1937.
