= Roman Pilar =

Soviet Intelligence Officer (1894–1937)

Filipp Medved
- Филипп Медве́дь

Head of the OGPU/NKVD of Central Asia
- In office 1932–1934

Chairman of the OGPU under the Council of People's Commissars of the Byelorussian SSR
- In office 7 December 1925 – 1 November 1929
- Preceded by: Filipp Medved
- Succeeded by: Grigoriy Rappoport

Personal details
- Born: 1890 Łapy, Congress Poland, Russian Empire
- Died: 27 November 1937 (aged 46–47) Moscow, Russian SFSR, Soviet Union
- Party: Russian Communist Party (1918–1937)
- Other political affiliations: Russian Social Democratic Labour Party (19014–1918)

Military service
- Allegiance: Russian Soviet Federative Socialist Republic (1917–1922); Soviet Union (1922–1937)
- Branch/service: Cheka; GPU; OGPU; NKVD
- Years of service: 1917–1937
- Battles/wars: Russian Civil War

Roman Alexandrovich Pilar (Russian: Роман Александрович Пиляр, born: Baron Romuald Ludwig Pilar von Pilchau; 1894 – 2 September 1937) was a Soviet security and intelligence officer.

== Early life ==
Pilar was born in the town of Łapy, Białystok County. His father, German by origin, was from the baronial family of Pillar von Pilchau. Roman was a cousin of Felix Dzerzhinsky. From September 1905 he studied at the gymnasium in Vilna, Zurich (Switzerland), Ahrensburg (Governorate of Livonia), and in the city of Danilov, Yaroslavl Governorate. From 1914 Pilar was a member of the Russian Social Democratic Labour Party and was an active participant in the revolutionary movement.

== Russian Revolution and Civil War ==
After the success of the February Revolution, from March 1917, Pilar was secretary of the Danilov Council of Peasants' Deputies. From August to October 1917 he was a cadet of a military school in Moscow. From October 1917, he worked underground in Lithuania occupied by the Imperial German Army. He was arrested and until April 1918 he was imprisoned. From April 1918 he was one of the leaders of the party underground in Vilna and was elected chairman of the Military Revolutionary Committee of Lithuania. He was of the founders of the Communist Party of Lithuania and Belarus. In October 1918, he was elected to its Central Committee, and at the Plenum that took place soon, he was a member of the Vilna city committee and secretary of the Central Committee of the KPLB. He participated in battles with the Polish Samoobrona.

From January 1919 Pilar was a member of the Presidium and secretary of the Central Executive Committee of the Lithuanian-Belarusian Socialist Soviet Republic. When the Poles captured the headquarters of the workers' representatives on the street, he tried to shoot himself in Vilna, but survived (the bullet hit the lung). Until April 1919 he was treated in a hospital. In May, after the capture of Vilna by Polish troops and the fall of the Soviets, he shot himself, but survived. In December 1919, he arrived in the RSFSR during an exchange of prisoners.

From January 1920, Pilar was deputy chairman. Commission of the People's Commissariat of Foreign Affairs of the RSFSR for the exchange of political prisoners with Poland. From April, the special representative of the military counterintelligence (OO) Cheka of the Western Front. In October 1920 - March 1921 he was carrying out clandestine work in Upper Silesia, Germany.

From March 1921, Pilar was the head of the 15th special department of the special department of the VChK. From July, he was second assistant to the head of the OO of the Cheka and GPU. Simultaneously, from December 1921, assistant chief of the First Chief Directorate GPU. In July 1922-December 1925, Deputy Head of the Counterintelligence Department (KRO) of the Secret Operational Directorate (SOU) of the GPU and OGPU of Artur Artuzov.

During the Genoa Conference (1922) Pilar ensured the security of the Soviet delegation. From 1924 to 1925, along with Artuzov, he was directly involved in the development and implementation of large counterintelligence operations "Trust" and "Syndicate–2". From December 1925 to December 1929 Pilar was the chairman of the GPU of the Byelorussian SSR. From November 1929 he was the Plenipotentiary of the OGPU for the North Caucasus Territory (SKK),

From November 1932, Pilar was the Plenipotentiary of the OGPU for Central Asia. From July 1934 he was Head of the NKVD of Central Asia. In November 1934 he was recalled to the order of the OK NKVD of the USSR. From December 1934, the head of the UNKVD for the Saratov Territory / Saratov Region.

== Arrest and execution ==
On 16 May 1937, Pilar was removed from his post and arrested on the night of 17 May. Pilar was accused of belonging to the POV (Polish Military Organization) and agents of the Polish intelligence agencies, as well as in carrying out sabotage in the organs of the NKVD. On 2 September 1937, by the Decree of the Commission consisting of the People's Commissariat of Internal Affairs, the Procurator General of the Soviet Union and the Chairman of the All-Union Committee of the USSR Armed Forces, he was sentenced to capital punishment "in a special order" and was shot on the same day.

In July 1957, by the decision of the Supreme Court of the Soviet Union, the verdict was overturned and Pilar was rehabilitated.
