= Yacov Boyarsky =

Soviet theatre, trade union and community activist

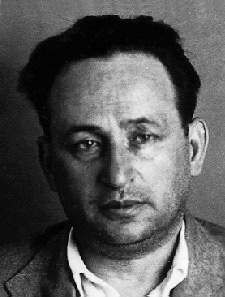
- Boyarsky after his arrest in 1939.
- Born: Yacov Iosifovich Shimshelevich; 14 March 1890; Smarhon, Russian Empire
- Died: 2 February 1940 (aged 49); Moscow, Soviet Union

Yacov Osipovich Boyarsky (Yacov Iosifovich Shimshelevich) was a Soviet theatre, trade union and community activist. In 1929—1936 he headed the Trade Union of Art Workers, in 1937—1939 he was the director of the Moscow Art Theatre.

== Life ==
Yacov Boyarsky was born on 14 March 1890 in Smarhonʹ, Vilna Governorate. He was the youngest son in a large Jewish family and had five brothers and two sisters. His father was a postal clerk. Yacov entered the Minsk Commercial school but was excluded for his membership in revolutionary circles, close to the Bund. In 1911 he was called up for military service to Perm Infantry Regiment No.101, to the end of the war he served as a record clerk in a management unit. After the February Revolution he headed the company, then a regiment Army Committee.

In 1918 he took discharge and settled in the Tver Governorate. In 1919 he joined the CPSU, in the same year he headed the local Council of National Economy in Kimry. In 1919—1921 he was the director of the Propaganda and Agitation Department at the Tver Principal Committee and headed the Tver Economy Council. In 1921 he took an active part in the suppression of the Kronstadt rebellion.

Boyarsky participated in the establishment of the USSR Trade Unions. In 1921-1924 he was the chairman of the Smolensk Governorate Committee of Professional Unions, in 1924-1925 he occupied similar posts in Orenburg and Kazakh Committees, in 1926-1928 — in Kazan, in 1928-1929 — in Samara. Since the 10th Congress of the Russian Communist Party Boyarsky was a member of all Party and Federal Congresses. He was elected to the All-Russian and Central Executive Committees. In 1925 in Kazakhstan he met Nikolai Yezhov. In the 1920s he started using his mother's surname as a political pseudonym.

Since 1929 Boyarsky lived in Moscow. Between 1929 and 1936 he was the chairman of the RABIS. In 1930 he made a significant contribution to the establishment of the Central Art Workers House. Solomon Mikhoels, the art-director of the Moscow State Jewish Theatre spoke favourably about Boyarsky's management talent. French art expert Paul Gsell visited Moscow in 1934 and met Boyarsky, he remembered Yacov Osipovich "as a very active person with a very agile mind". Positive memories and opinions on him were also left by Boris Fillipov and Ivan Kozlovsky. In 1936 Boyarsky supported Alexander Tairov from government oppression.

In 1936-1937 Yakov Boyarsky became the First Deputy Chairman in the USSR Arts Committee. In 1937 he replaced the purged former director of the Moscow Art Theatre Michael Arkadyev. Under his direction were released such plays as "Woe from Wit" (1938), "The Earth", "Dostigaev and Co", etc. Pavel Markov, the Soviet art critic and teacher, highly appreciated the new director's work. Boyarsky had a troubled relationship with Konstantin Stanislavski but was on good terms with Vladimir Nemirovich-Danchenko. Yacov Osipovich tried to help and re-employ Mikhail Bulgakov to the theatre, but the writer disliked Boyarsky and left his offer without an answer.

The Boyarskys were friends with Sergei Eisenstein and Nikolai Yezhov's family, they even rented a country house together, Yakov Agranov was their close neighbour. Such prominent art workers as Vladimir Mayakovsky, Lilya Brik, Nikolai Aseev, Isaac Babel, and Eduard Bagritsky were their guests.

When in 1939 Yezhov was arrested, he acknowledged homosexual contacts with Boyarsky in 1925 in Orenburg (homosexuality was a legal offense in the USSR since 1934 up to the 1990s). On the basis of Yezhov's statement, Boyarsky was arrested on 5 July 1939. Under interrogation, Boyarsky refused to confirm any counterrevolutionary activities but didn't reject accusations of homosexuality (presumably, trying to avoid political charges).

On 1 February 1940 Boyarsky was sentenced to capital punishment by the Military Collegium of the Supreme Court of the Soviet Union on charges of participating in the ‘Anti-Soviet Organization Of Rights And Trotskyites’. He was shot on 2 February 1940, together with Vsevolod Meyerhold and Mikhail Koltsov. Boyarsky was rehabilitated on 3 March 1956.

== Family ==
In 1908 Boyarsky married Anna Arluck, a daughter of a lawyer and a pharmacist from Vilnius Isidor Arluck. On 25 October 1917, in Moscow, the couple's son was born. Iosif Boyarsky became a prominent figure in the Soviet cinema. Yakov and Anna also had a daughter Maya.

== Memory ==
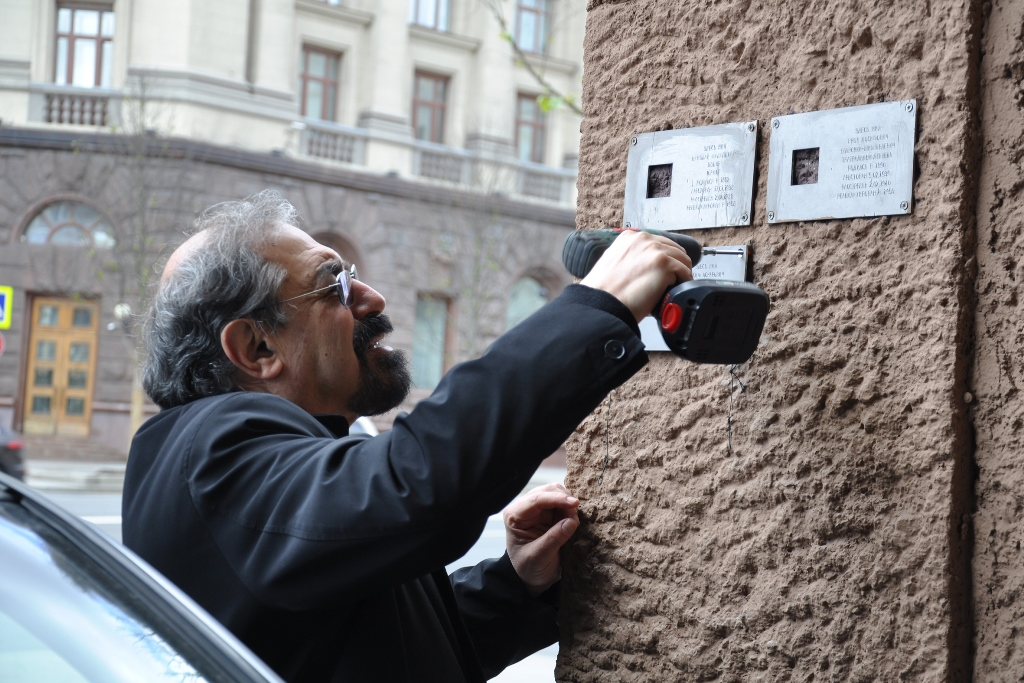
Installation of the «Last Address» memorial sign

On 19 December 1966 the memorial evening was held at the Central House of Art Workers in Moscow.

== Sources ==
- Markov, P. A., ed. (1967). "Боярский, Яков Осипович". Theatre Encyclopedia (in Russian). Vol. VI. Moscow: Sovetskaya Encyclopedia. p. 1136.
- Boyarsky, Iosif (1996). Литературные коллажи [Literature Collages] (in Russian). Moscow.
- Petrov, Nikita; Yansen, M. (2009). «Сталинский питомец» — Николай Ежов [“Stalin’s Pet” — Nikolai Yezhov] (in Russian). Moscow: ROSSPEN. pp. 365–366. ISBN 978-5-8243-0919-5.
- Sokolov, Boris (2016). Булгаков. Мастер и демоны судьбы [Bulgakov. Master and Demons of Fate] (in Russian). Moscow: Eksmo. p. 848. ISBN 978-5-699-87443-9.
