= Kirov Square, Yekaterinburg =

Square in Yekaterinburg, Russia

Coordinates: 56.8437°N 60.6511°E

Kirov Square (Russian: площадь Кирова) is a square in Yekaterinburg, Russia at the eastern end of Prospekt Lenina.

The square was created in 1939.

The square is named after Sergey Kirov, who was a Bolshevik functionary and Soviet politician.
