= Semyon Gendin =

Soviet intelligence officer (1902–1939)

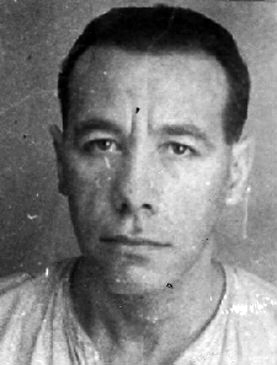
Semyon Gendin after arrest, 1938

Semyon Grigorivich Gendin (1902 in Daugavpils – February 23, 1939) was head of the foreign military intelligence agency of the Soviet Army General Staff of the Soviet Union. He served in the Cheka, the Joint State Political Directorate and NKVD. His rank was equivalent to that of a Soviet Red Army Komdiv (division commander). He was a recipient of the Order of Lenin (1937), the Order of the Red Banner (1927, 1938) and the Jubilee Medal "XX Years of the Workers' and Peasants' Red Army" (1938). During the Great Purge, he was arrested on October 22, 1938, sentenced to death by the Military Collegium of the Supreme Court of the Soviet Union on February 22, 1939 and executed the next day.

== Bibliography ==
- Гендин С. Г. // Петров Н. В., Скоркин К. В. (1999). Кто руководил НКВД, 1934—1941 : справочник (3000 экз ed.). М.: Звенья. p. 502. ISBN 5-7870-0032-3.
- Коллектив составителей и редакторов (2006). Военный совет при народном комиссаре обороны СССР. 1938, 1940 гг.: Документы и материалы (1000 экз ed.). М: РОССПЭН. p. 336. ISBN 5-8243-0694-X.
- Колпакиди А., Север А. (2009). ГРУ. Уникальная энциклопедия. Энциклопедия спецназа (5000 экз ed.). М.: Яуза Эксмо. pp. 683–685. ISBN 978-5-699-30920-7.

Preceded by Alexander Nikonov	Head of the Main Intelligence Directorate of the Soviet Union; September 1937 – October 1938	Succeeded by Alexander Orlov
