= Filipp Medved =

Soviet Belarusian revolutionary (1890–1937)

- Филипп Медве́дь

Head of the NKVD of the Leningrad Region
- In office 15 July 1934 – 3 December 1934
- Preceded by: Position established
- Succeeded by: Leonid Zakovsky

Chairman of the OGPU under the Council of People's Commissars of the Byelorussian SSR
- In office 7 April 1924 – 3 December 1925
- Preceded by: Jan Olsky
- Succeeded by: Roman Pilar

Chairman of the Petrograd Cheka
- In office 5 May 1919 – 30 August 1919
- Preceded by: Semyon Lobov
- Succeeded by: Georgy Blagonravov

Personal details
- Born: 1890 Stare Masiewo, Pruzhansky Uyezd, Grodno Governorate, Russian Empire
- Died: 27 November 1937 (aged 46–47) Moscow, Russian SFSR, Soviet Union
- Party: RSDLP (Bolsheviks) (1907–1918); Russian Communist Party (1918–1937)
- Awards: 2; 2 Honorary Worker of the Cheka

Military service
- Allegiance: Russian Empire (1917–1918); Russian Soviet Federative Socialist Republic (1921–1922); Soviet Union (1922–1937)
- Branch/service: Imperial Russian Army; Cheka; GPU; OGPU; NKVD
- Battles/wars: World War I Russian Civil War

Filip Demyanovich Medved (Belarusian: Фили́пп Демья́нович Медве́дь; Belarusian: Пілі́п Дзям’я́навіч Мядзьве́дзь; 1890 – 27 November 1937) was a Belarusian revolutionary and official of the Soviet state securities, the Cheka, GPU, OGPU and NKVD.

== Biography ==
Born in to a Belarusian working-class family, Medved was active in the workers' movement in Warsaw in Congress Poland from a young age and was expelled from his school.

Medved worked as a constructor technician and was a member of an underground Marxist circle. In 1907 he joined the party of Social Democracy of the Kingdom of Poland and Lithuania and the Bolshevik faction of the Russian Social Democratic Labour Party. He was arrested four times for his revolutionary activity and served in prison for two years. During World War I he was drafted and briefly served in the Imperial Russian Army.

After the October Revolution, from November 1917 to May 1918 he was one of the organizers of the Sokolniki District militia and he consecutively held the posts of a member of the Sokolniki District Military Revolutionary Committee, the head of the 1st Moscow Revolutionary Detachment, and of the military commissar of the Sokolniki District.

Among the founders of the Cheka, he was a member of the Control Board of the Cheka and worked directly under the leadership of Felix Dzerzhinsky. He was chairman of the Tula Cheka, and then from August 1918 to May 1919 he served as the chairman of the Petrograd Cheka. In 1919, he was transferred to the front as the head of the Special Section of the Cheka on the Western Front. From October to December 1919, he was the head of the Department of Forced Labor of the NKVD of the RSFSR. Then, he was transferred to the Western Front again.

A member of the Cheka Collegium, he was deputy chairman of the Moscow Cheka and head of the Moscow Provincial Political Department.

In the years 1934-35 he was plenipotentiary representative of the OGPU under the Council of People's Commissars of the USSR for the Western Territory and then the Chairman of the OGPU under the Council of People's Commissars of the Byelorussian Soviet Socialist Republic.

From 1926 to 1929, he was the plenipotentiary representative of the OGPU at the Council of People's Commissars of the USSR for the Far-Eastern Krai. From 1930 to 1934, he was head of the OGPU of the Leningrad Military District, simultaneously from 1930 to 1932 the head of the special department of the OGPU of the Leningrad Military District as well as a member of the OGPU Collegium under the Council of People's Commissars of the USSR.

Medved was head of the NKVD Directorate of Leningrad from July to December 1934. He oversaw arrests and expulsions from Leningrad of supporters of the Party Oppositionists and led repressions against "representatives of the exploiting classes" and "class alien elements." He was a close friend and associate of the first secretary of the Leningrad Party Region, Sergei Kirov, and enjoyed his support throughout his service as head of the Leningrad NKVD.

== Arrest and execution ==
After the murder of Sergei Kirov he was removed from his office, was summoned to Moscow and arrested. On 9 January 1935 he was expelled from the VKP (b), and on 23 January 1935 the Military Collegium of the Supreme Court of the USSR sentenced him to 3 years in prison for "criminally negligent attitude to their duties to protect the state security".

In late 1935 he was pardoned and was released. From 1935 to May 1937 he was the head of the Southern Mining and Industrial Directorate of the Main Directorate for the Construction of the Dalstroy of the NKVD of the USSR.

During the Great Purge he was once again arrested in September 1937 and was sentenced to death for his participation in the anti Soviet "Polish military organization.". On 27 November 1937 he was shot along with the former People's Commissar of the NKVD of the Ukrainian SSR Vsevold Balitsky.

On 17 December 1957 Filipp Medved was posthumously rehabilitated by the Military Collegium of the Supreme Court of the Soviet Union.
