= Alexander Nikonov =

- Born: 31 August 1893; Olonets Governorate, Russian Empire
- Died: 26 October 1937 (aged 44) Moscow Oblast, Russian Soviet Federative Socialist Republic, Soviet Union
- Allegiance: Russian Empire; Soviet Union
- Branch: Imperial Russian Army; Soviet Red Army
- Rank: Komdiv
- Conflicts: World War I Russian Civil War

Alexander Matveevich Nikonov (Russian: Александр Матвеевич Никонов; 31 August 1893 – 26 October 1937) was a Soviet komdiv (division commander). He fought in the Imperial Russian Army during World War I before going over to the Bolsheviks in February 1917 and serving in the Red Army during the subsequent Civil War.

Novikov was an acting head of the Main Intelligence Directorate of the Red Army in 1937.

He was executed during the Great Purge.

== Bibliography ==
- Горчаков О. А. (2004). Ян Берзин — командарм ГРУ. Санкт-Петербург: Нева.
- Черушев Н. С.; Черушев Ю. Н. (2012), Расстрелянная элита РККА (командармы 1-го и 2-го рангов, комкоры, комдивы и им равные): 1937—1941. Биографический словарь [Shot elite of the Red Army (commanders of the 1st and 2nd ranks, comkors, divisional commanders and their equal): 1937-1941. Biographical Dictionary], Moscow: Kuchkovo field; Metropolis [Кучково поле; Мегаполис], pp. 252–253, ISBN 978-5-9950-0217-8

Preceded by Yan Karlovich Berzin	Head of the Main Intelligence Directorate of the Soviet Union; August 1937	Succeeded by Semyon Gendin
