= Main Intelligence Directorate (Soviet Union) =

Soviet military intelligence agency (1918–92)

- Glavnoje razvedyvatel'noje upravlenije ГРУ СССР; Главное разведывательное управление

Agency overview
- Formed: 5 November 1918 as Registration Agency; GRU since 1942
- Preceding agencies: Fifth Department of the Russian Imperial Chief of Staff; Expedition for Secret Affairs
- Dissolved: 7 May 1992
- Superseding agency: GRU (Russian Federation)
- Jurisdiction: Red Army (1918–1946); Soviet Army (1946–1991)
- Headquarters: Moscow
- Employees: Classified
- Annual budget: Classified
- Parent agency: Ministry of Defense
- Child agencies: Osnaz; Spetsnaz GRU

The emblem of the RVS

Main Intelligence Directorate (Russian: Главное разведывательное управление, romanized: Glavnoye razvedyvatel'noye upravleniye, IPA: [ˈglavnəjə rɐzˈvʲɛdɨvətʲɪlʲnəjə ʊprɐˈvlʲenʲɪjə]), abbreviated GRU (Russian: ГРУ, IPA: [ɡɨ̞‿rɨ̞‿ˈu], [gru]), was the foreign military intelligence agency of the General Staff of the Soviet Armed Forces until 1991. For a few months it was also the foreign military intelligence agency of the newly established Russian Federation until 7 May 1992 when it was dissolved and the Russian GRU took over its activities.

== History ==
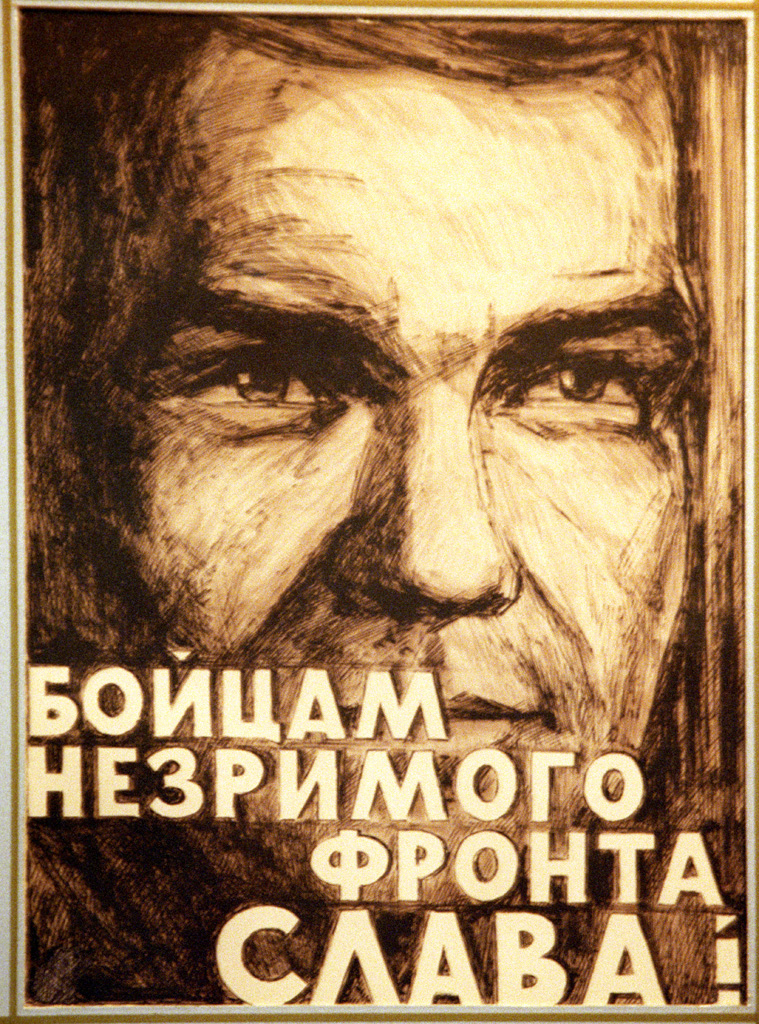
Showpiece of exhibition dedicated to 80th anniversary of Russian foreign intelligence service

The GRU's first predecessor in Russia formed on October 21, 1918 by secret order under the sponsorship of Leon Trotsky (then the civilian leader of the Red Army), signed by Jukums Vācietis, the first commander-in-chief of the Red Army (RKKA), and by Ephraim Sklyansky, deputy to Trotsky; it was originally known as the Registration Directorate (Registrupravlenie, or RU). Semyon Aralov was its first head. In his history of the early years of the GRU, Raymond W. Leonard writes:

As originally established, the Registration Department was not directly subordinate to the General Staff (at the time called the Red Army Field Staff – Polevoi Shtab). Administratively, it was the Third Department of the Field Staff's Operations Directorate. In July 1920, the RU was made the second of four main departments in the Operations Directorate. Until 1921, it was usually called the Registrupr (Registration Department). That year, following the Soviet–Polish War, it was elevated in status to become the Second (Intelligence) Directorate of the Red Army Staff, and was thereafter known as the Razvedupr. This probably resulted from its new primary peacetime responsibilities as the main source of foreign intelligence for the Soviet leadership. As part of a major re-organization of the Red Army, sometime in 1925 or 1926 the RU (then Razvedyvatelnoe Upravlenye) became the Fourth (Intelligence) Directorate of the Red Army Staff, and was thereafter also known simply as the "Fourth Department." Throughout most of the interwar period, the men and women who worked for Red Army Intelligence called it either the Fourth Department, the Intelligence Service, the Razvedupr, or the RU. […] As a result of the re-organization [in 1926], carried out in part to break up Trotsky's hold on the army, the Fourth Department seems to have been placed directly under the control of the State Defense Council (Gosudarstvennaia komissiia oborony, or GKO), the successor of the RVSR. Thereafter its analysis and reports went directly to the GKO and the Politburo, apparently even bypassing the Red Army Staff.

The first head of the 4th Directorate was Yan Karlovich Berzin, a Latvian Communist and former member of the Cheka, who served until 1935 and again in 1937. He was arrested in May 1938 and subsequently murdered in July 1938 during the so-called "Latvian Operation" of Joseph Stalin's Great Purge.

The GRU in its modern form was created by Stalin in February 1942, less than a year after the invasion of the Soviet Union by Nazi Germany. From April 1943 the GRU handled human intelligence exclusively outside the USSR.

The GRU had the task of handling all military intelligence, particularly the collection of intelligence of military or political significance from sources outside the Soviet Union. It operated rezidenturas (residencies) all over the world, along with the signals intelligence (SIGINT) station in Lourdes, Cuba, and throughout the Soviet-bloc countries.

The GRU was known in the Soviet government for its fierce independence from the rival "internal intelligence organizations", such as the Main Directorate of State Security (GUGB), State Political Directorate (GPU), MGB, OGPU, NKVD, NKGB, KGB and the First Chief Directorate (PGU). At the time of the GRU's creation, Lenin infuriated the Cheka (the predecessor of the KGB) by ordering it not to interfere with the GRU's operations.

Nonetheless, the Cheka infiltrated the GRU in 1919. That worsened a fierce rivalry between the two agencies, which were both engaged in espionage. The rivalry became even more intense than that between the Federal Bureau of Investigation and Central Intelligence Agency in the US.

The existence of the GRU was not publicized during the Soviet era, but documents concerning it became available in the West in the late 1920s, and it was mentioned in the 1931 memoirs of the first OGPU defector, Georges Agabekov, and described in detail in the 1939 autobiography of Walter Krivitsky (I Was Stalin's Agent), who was the most senior Red Army intelligence officer ever to defect. It became widely known in Russia, and in the West outside the narrow confines of the intelligence community, during perestroika, in part thanks to the writings of "Viktor Suvorov" (Vladimir Rezun), a GRU officer who defected to Great Britain in 1978 and wrote about his experiences in the Soviet military and intelligence services. According to Suvorov, even the General Secretary of the Communist Party of the Soviet Union, when entering the GRU headquarters, needed to go through a security screening. In Aquarium Suvorov alleges that during his training and service he was often reminded that exiting the GRU (retiring) was only possible through "The Smoke Stack". This was a GRU reference to a training film shown to him, in which he alleges he watched a condemned agent being burned alive in a furnace.

== Activities ==
During the Cold War, the Sixth Directorate was responsible for monitoring Intelsat communication satellites traffic.

GRU Sixth Directorate officers reportedly visited North Korea following the capture (January 1968) of the USS Pueblo, inspecting the vessel and receiving some of the captured equipment.

== Directors ==
No.	Head	Term	Leader(s) served under
1	Semyon Aralov	November 1918 – July 1919	Vladimir Lenin
2	Sergei Gusev	July 1919 – January 1920	Vladimir Lenin
3	Georgy Pyatakov	January 1920 – February 1920	Vladimir Lenin
4	Voldemar Aussem	February 1920 – August 1920	Vladimir Lenin
5	Yan Lentsman	August 1920 – April 1921	Vladimir Lenin
6	Arvid Zeybot	April 1921 – March 1924	Vladimir Lenin
6	Arvid Zeybot	April 1921 – March 1924	Joseph Stalin
7	Yan Karlovich Berzin	1924 – April 1935	Joseph Stalin
8	Semyon Uritsky	April 1935 – July 1937	Joseph Stalin
(7)	Yan Karlovich Berzin	July 1937 – August 1937	Joseph Stalin
9	Alexander Nikonov	August 1937 – August 1937	Joseph Stalin
10	Semyon Gendin	September 1937 – October 1938	Joseph Stalin
11	Alexander Orlov	October 1938 – April 1939	Joseph Stalin
12	Ivan Proskurov	April 1939 – July 1940	Joseph Stalin
13	Filipp Golikov	July 1940 – October 1941	Joseph Stalin
14	Alexei Panfilov	October 1941 – November 1942	Joseph Stalin
15	Ivan Ilyichev	November 1942 – June 1945	Joseph Stalin
16	Fyodor Kuznetsov	June 1945 – November 1947	Joseph Stalin
17	Nikolai Trusov	September 1947 – January 1949	Joseph Stalin
18	Matvei Zakharov	January 1949 – June 1952	Joseph Stalin
19	Mikhail Shalin	June 1952 – August 1956	Joseph Stalin
19	Mikhail Shalin	June 1952 – August 1956	Nikita Khrushchev
20	Sergei Shtemenko	August 1956 – October 1957	Nikita Khrushchev
(19)	Mikhail Shalin	October 1957 – December 1958	Nikita Khrushchev
21	Ivan Serov	December 1958 – February 1963	Nikita Khrushchev
21	Ivan Serov	March 1963 – July 1987	Nikita Khrushchev
22	Pyotr Ivashutin	March 1963 – July 1987	Leonid Brezhnev; Yuri Andropov; Konstantin Chernenko
	Pyotr Ivashutin	March 1963 – July 1987	Mikhail Gorbachev
23	Vladlen Mikhailov	July 1987 – October 1991	Mikhail Gorbachev

== Personnel ==
=== GRU defectors ===
Name	Rank	Defection date	Country of defection	Comment
Aleksandr Yanovich Sipelgas		late 1924	Finland	Intelligence illegal. Published under the pan names Andrey Smirnov and Olshanskiy
Vladimir Stepanovich Nesterovich	Kombrig	April 1925	France	Assassinated in August 1925
Ignatiy Leonovich Dzevaltovskiy		November 1925	Poland	
Aleksandr Aleksandrovich Sobolev	Lieutenant	April 1930	Sweden	Naval attaché in Stockholm
Ignace Reiss	Kombrig	July 1937	France	Real name, Ignatiy Stanislavovich Poretskiy. Assassinated in Switzerland in September 1937
Aleksandr Grigoriyevich Graff	Kombrig	July 1937	France	Known after defection as Alexander Gregory Barmine
Walter Germanovich Krivitsky	Kombrig	October 1937	France	Real name, Samuel Gershovich Ginzberg. Emigrated to the United States in 1939. Died under suspicious circumstance in 1941.
Ivan Matveyevich Grachev	Major	September 1941	Nazi Germany	
Georgiy Petrovich Ryabtsev	Major	September 1941	Nazi Germany	Commander of reconnaissance battalion
Anatoliy Mikhailovich Odintsov	Captain	September 1941	Nazi Germany	Chief of an intelligence section in the Kiev special military district
Bogdan Leontyevich Velepolskiy		October 1941	Nazi Germany	Member of behind-the-lines intelligence team
Petr Trofimovich Gryadunov		October 1941	Nazi Germany	Radio operator for behind-the-lines intelligence team
Vitaliy Grigoryevich Lyuboslavskiy		November 1941	Nazi Germany	Member of behind-the-lines intelligence team of the Northwestern Front
Lev Mikhailovich Kolosov		December 1941	Nazi Germany	Member of behind-the-lines intelligence team of the Leningrad Front
Ismail Guseynovich Akhmedov	Lieutenant colonel	May 1942	Turkey	Under journalist cover in Turkey. Interviewed by Kim Philby in 1947, emigrated to the United States in 1948
Nina Ilinichna Chaplygina		June 1942	Nazi Germany	Radio operator for behind-the-lines intelligence team of the North Caucasus Front
Magsum Akhmetkhanovich Akhmetshin		July 1942	Nazi Germany	Member of behind-the-lines intelligence team of the Volkhov Front
Khelge Eynarovich Vainio		August 1942	Finland	Member of behind-the-lines intelligence team of the Leningrad Front
Vladimir Dmitriyevich Fomenko		October 1942	Nazi Germany	Member of stay-behind intelligence team
Yuriy Ivanovich Sedashov		1942	Nazi Germany	Member of behind-the-lines intelligence team in Voroshilovgrad Oblast (now Lugansk Oblast), Ukraine
Nikolay Vasilyevich Sivtsov		1942	Nazi Germany	Member of stay-behind intelligence team in Zhytomyr Oblast, Ukraine
Aleksandr Aleksandrovich Danilov		May 1945	Nazi Germany	Member of intelligence section of the Black Sea Fleet Air Force
Igor Sergeyevich Gouzenko	Lieutenant	September 1945	Canada	Code clerk at Soviet embassy in Ottawa. Defection led to the Gouzenko Affair
Aleksandr Stepanovich Kirsanov	Lieutenant	1946	Canada	Naval GRU. Radioman in a Special Purpose Radio Detachment, Red Banner Danube Flotilla Headquarters
Vladimir Aleksandrovich Skripkin	Lieutenant	August 1946	Japan United States United Kingdom	Offered to defect but was caught and forcibly returned to the Soviet Union
Mikhail Filippovich Denisov		August 1947	United States	Interpreter for the GRU section of the Red Banner Danube Fleet
Vadim Ivanovich Shelaputin	Senior Lieutenant	March 1949	United States	Posted to Soviet embassy in Vienna
Nikolay Ivanovich Marchenkov	Captain	March 1950	Germany	Member of Operational-Intelligence Section of a GRU unit, Group of Soviet Forces in Germany
Karapet Arutyunovich Anakyan		July 1953	Turkey	Intelligence illegal
Ivan Vasilyevich Ovchinnikov	Lieutenant	December 1955	Germany	Translator in the 28th Special Purpose (Intercept) Regiment in Stahnsdorf, Germany
Kaarlo Tuomi		March 1959	United States	Intelligence illegal
Stanislav Lunev	Colonel	1992	United States	
Vladimir Bogdanovich Rezun	Captain	June 1978	Switzerland	Published multiple books under the pen name Viktor Suvorov
Iavor Entchev			United States	No further information available

=== "Illegals" ===
- Boris Bukov RU RKKA officer
- Yakov Grigorev
- Hede Massing
- Richard Sorge
- George Koval, an engineer who stole atomic secrets from the Manhattan Project.
- Moishe Stern
- Joshua Tamer
- Alfred Tilton
- Alexander Ulanovsky
- Zalman Litvin, aka Ignacy Witczak

=== GRU officers recruited by foreign intelligence services ===
- Petr Popov, recruited by CIA in 1953; arrested in 1958; executed in 1960
- Oleg Penkovsky, Run jointly by the CIA and SIS. Arrested and executed in 1962. Played an important role during the Cuban Missile Crisis.
- Dmitri Polyakov, a high-ranking GRU officer who volunteered to spy for the FBI in 1962; arrested in 1986; executed in 1988.
- Aleksey Shistov (aka Mikhail Fedorov), a GRU illegal who walk-in to CIA in 1957; recalled in 1958
- Nikolay Vetrov, run jointly by the FBI and CIA; arrested in 1963
- Vyacheslav Baranov, recruited by CIA in 1989; arrested in 1992; released in 1997 and emigrated to US

=== Agents ===
- Whittaker Chambers, defected in 1938
- Juliet Poyntz, disappeared in 1939
- Stig Bergling
- Joseph Milton Bernstein
- Eugene Franklin Coleman
- Desmond Patrick Costello (alleged)
- Sviatoslav Konstantinovich Mel'nikov
- Klaus Fuchs
- Harold Glasser
- Tanner Greimann
- Rudolf Herrnstadt
- Arvid Jacobson
- Gerhard Kegel
- Mary Jane Keeney and Philip Keeney
- Tadeusz Kobylański
- Ursula Kuczynski
- Stefan Litauer
- Seán MacBride
- Robert Osman
- Ward Pigman
- Adam Priess
- Alexander Radó
- Vincent Reno
- Elie Renous
- William Spiegel
- Lydia Stahl
- Irving Charles Velson, Brooklyn Navy Yard; American Labor Party candidate for New York State Senate
- Stig Wennerström

=== Naval agents ===
- Jack Fahy (Naval GRU), Office of the Coordinator of Inter-American Affairs; Board of Economic Warfare; United States Department of the Interior
- Edna Patterson Naval GRU, served in US August 1943 to 1956
- Dieter Gerhardt, a commodore who served in South African Navy from 1962 to 1983 and spied for the Soviets for 20 years

== See also ==
- SMERSH
