= Yan Karlovich Berzin =

Latvian and Soviet politician and diplomat (1889–1938)

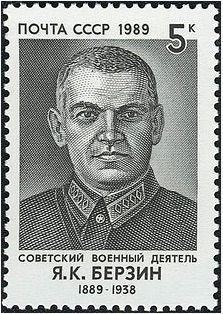
Soviet stamp of Yan Berzin

Yan (Ian) Karlovich Berzin (Russian: Ян Карлович Берзин; Latvian: Jānis Bērziņš, also "Jan Berzin" and "Starik"; real name Pēteris Ķuzis; 25 November [O.S. 13 November] 1889 – 29 July 1938) was a Latvian and Soviet communist politician and military intelligence officer.

== Biography ==
Ķuzis joined the Russian Social Democratic Labour Party in 1905. According to his former subordinate, Walter Krivitsky, Ķuzis led a guerrilla detachment in his native country of Latvia at the age of 16 during the 1905 Revolution, and was wounded, caught, and sentenced to death. His sentence was commuted because of his youth; after two years in prison, he was deported to Siberia, but escaped. Rearrested and sent back into exile in 1911, he escaped in 1914, and was a private in the Russian army until he deserted in 1916.

Ķuzis joined the Bolsheviks after the Russian Revolution, rising to the rank of general and chief of the Latvian Red Army. From December 1917, he operated in the apparatus of the Cheka and became a principal organizer of Lenin's Red Terror, credited with devising the system of taking and shooting hostages to recover deserters, and to put down peasant rebellions in areas controlled by the Red Army. He was recognized by his superiors for his work in pursuing, arresting, and liquidating Russian sailors after the Bolshevik suppression of the Kronstadt rebellion in March 1921. Promoted to head of the Red Army's Fourth Bureau (military intelligence), the GRU, he served from 1920 to 1935. Among his agents was the prominent German spy Richard Sorge.

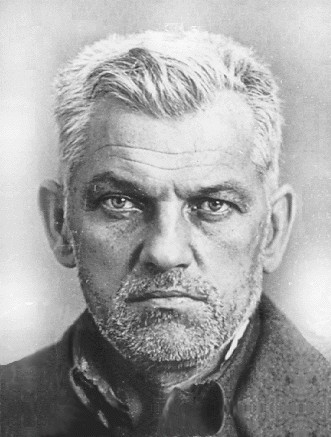
Photo of Berzin after his arrest by the NKVD in 1937

He was dismissed in 1935, and served for a year in the Far East. In September 1936, he was sent to Madrid, under the nom de guerre Grishin, as chief military adviser to the Republican side in the Spanish Civil War. In November, he transferred to Valencia. On 8 June 1937, he was recalled to Moscow and was reappointed to his old post as head of military intelligence on 8 June 1937, after his successor Semyon Uritsky had come under suspicion, but on 1 August 1937, he too was dismissed, and was succeeded by A.M. Nikonov, who was also dismissed and arrested a few days later. During the Great Purge as a part of the Latvian Operation of the NKVD, Berzin was arrested by the NKVD on 13 May 1938, and was shot on 29 July 1938.

He was rehabilitated in 1956.

== Other details ==
On 14 December 1948, Alexander Barmine, former chargé d'affaires at the Soviet embassy in Athens, Greece, advised Federal Bureau of Investigation agents that Berzin informed him prior to Barmine's 1937 defection that Owen Lattimore, the head of the U.S. Office of War Information in the Pacific during World War II, was a Soviet agent.

Berzin name appears in Witness, the 1952 memoir of Whittaker Chambers, as "Jan Berzin" and "Starik." He appears in the Venona decrypts under the code name "Starik" (Russian: Старик – "Old man").
