= Amy Knight =

American historian

- Born: July 10, 1946 (age 80); Chicago
- Occupations: Author, academic, historian

Academic background
- Education: London School of Economics

Academic work
- Institutions: Johns Hopkins University, George Washington University and Carleton University
- Notable works: The KGB: Police and Politics in the Soviet Union; Orders to Kill: The Putin Regime and Political Murder; Beria: Stalin's First Lieutenant; Spies Without Cloaks: The KGB's Successors

Amy W. Knight (born July 10, 1946) is an American historian of the Soviet Union and Russia. She has been described by The New York Times as "the West's foremost scholar" of the KGB.

== Life and career ==
Amy Knight was born in Chicago in 1946. She gained a Bachelor of Arts (BA) at the University of Michigan. She went on to gain a Doctor of Philosophy (PhD) in Russian politics at the London School of Economics and Political Science (LSE) in 1977. She taught at the LSE, the Paul H. Nitze School of Advanced International Studies at Johns Hopkins University, George Washington University and at Carleton University. She also worked for eighteen years at the U.S. Library of Congress as a specialist in Russian and Soviet affairs. Knight also writes for The New York Review of Books, The Times Literary Supplement, The Globe and Mail, and The Daily Beast.

In 1993–94, she was a fellow at the Woodrow Wilson International Center for Scholars.

== See also ==
- Magnitsky Act

== Bibliography ==
- Knight, Amy W. (1988). The KGB: Police and Politics in the Soviet Union. Boston: Unwin Hyman. ISBN 9780044450351.
- Knight, Amy (September–October 1988). "The KGB and Soviet Reform". Problems of Communism. 37 (5): 61–70.
- Knight, Amy (July 11, 1993). "Russian entrepreneurial spirit steals into secret spy archives". Letters to the Editor. The New York Times.
- Knight, Amy (1995). Beria: Stalin's First Lieutenant. Princeton University Press. ISBN 978-0-691-01093-9.
- Knight, Amy (1997). Spies without Cloaks: The KGB's Successors. Princeton University Press. ISBN 978-0-691-01718-1.
- Knight, Amy (2000). Who Killed Kirov?: The Kremlin's Greatest Mystery. Hill and Wang. ISBN 978-0-8090-9703-6.
- Knight, Amy (2007). How the Cold War Began: The Igor Gouzenko Affair and the Hunt for Soviet Spies. Carroll & Graf. ISBN 978-0-7867-1938-9.
- Knight, Amy (2017). Orders to Kill: The Putin Regime and Political Murder. St. Martin's Press. ISBN 978-1-250-11934-6
- Knight, Amy (February 22, 2018). "The Magnitsky affair". The New York Review of Books. 65 (3): 25–27.
