= Robert W. Thurston =

American historian and author (born 1949)

Robert W. Thurston (born 1949) is an American historian and author. He is professor emeritus at Miami University. His most recent publication is "Lynching" in the Elgar Encyclopedia of Crime and Criminal Justice His latest book is The Body in the Anglosphere, 1880-1920. This study examines concepts of gender, sexuality, race, and civilization as they were affected by new ideas, close interaction between races, and new technology like photography. He has also written on coffee (Coffee: From Bean to Barista, Coffee: A Comprehensive Guide to the Bean, the Beverage, and the Industry). Perhaps primarily known for his work on the history of Russia and the Soviet Union, Thurston has also written on early modern witch hunts (The Witch Hunts in Europe and North America: A History of the Witch Persecutions in Europe and North America, a revised edition of Witch, Wicce, Mother Goose: The Rise and Fall of the Witch Hunts in Europe and North America). He is also co-founder and managing partner of the Oxford Coffee Company, a roastery and coffeehouse in Oxford, Ohio.

His current research has the working title "The Near Death of a Young Republic: Migration, War, and Rebellion in America, 1791-94." He has published related op eds several times in the past months and years in the Cincinnati Enquirer.

He has given talks in recent years on the Northwest Indian wars of the 1790s. He has spoken in the U.S., Britain, France, Nicaragua, and China on coffee and consumption patterns. He has been interviewed regularly on coffee, for example for BBC Four, Food Network, and Dr. Oz The Good Life. His trips to coffee "origin", the industry term for coffee farms, have taken him to ten countries. He has been interviewed several times on WVXU, Cincinnati's NPR station, on several topics ranging from populism to coffee to the history of land preservation in the U.S.

He has written occasionally on current issues in Ukraine and on how people get their history from romance novels.

== Biography ==
Born in Washington, D.C., Thurston graduated from high school outside of Cleveland and received his undergraduate education at Northwestern University, studying Russian to complement his history degree. He went on to earn a doctorate in modern Russian history from the University of Michigan. He spent two separate years doing research in the Soviet Union/Russia and eventually moved to Oxford, Ohio, where he taught history at Miami University for 25 years until his retirement in 2015.

In 2012, Thurston co-founded the Oxford Coffee Company, a roastery, in Oxford, Ohio.

== Bibliography ==
- The Body in the Anglosphere, 1880-1920: "Well Sexed Womanhood," "Finer Natives," and "Very White Men," Routledge, 2022. Paper edition 2024.
- Coffee: From Bean to Barista, Rowman and Littlefield, 2018. Forthcoming in paper 2025.
- Coffee: A Comprehensive Guide to the Bean, the Beverage, and the Industry, senior editor and contributor, Rowman and Littlefield, 2013. The book won a prize from Gourmand Magazine as the best published on coffee in the U.S. in 2013. Named by Library Journal as one of the best reference works of 2013.
- Lynching: American Mob Murder in Global Perspective Ashgate, 2011.
- The Witch Hunts: A History of the Witch Persecutions in Europe and North America Longman, 2006. A revised version of Witch, Wicce, Mother Goose: The Rise and Fall of the Witch Hunts in Europe and North America Longman, 2001.
- The People's War: Responses to World War II in the Soviet Union, Co-editor with Bernd Bonwetsch, contributor, University of Illinois Press, 2000; anthology.
- Life and Terror in Stalin's Russia, 1934-1941 (1996). Yale University Press.
- Liberal City, Conservative State: Moscow and Russia's Urban Crisis, 1906-1914 Oxford University Press, 1987.
- Articles and op-eds in various newspapers and popular magazines, e.g. History Today. Articles on coffee in several trade magazines.
