= Military Collegium of the Supreme Court of the Soviet Union =

Military court of the Soviet Union

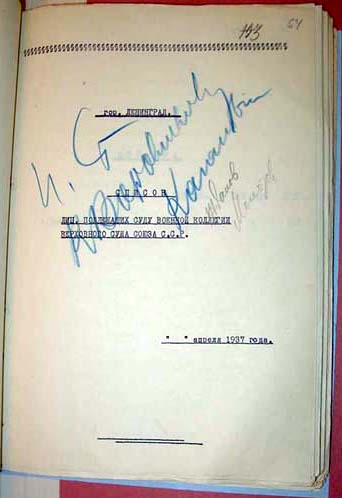
List of those tried by the Military Collegium during the Great Purge, signed by Stalin and others

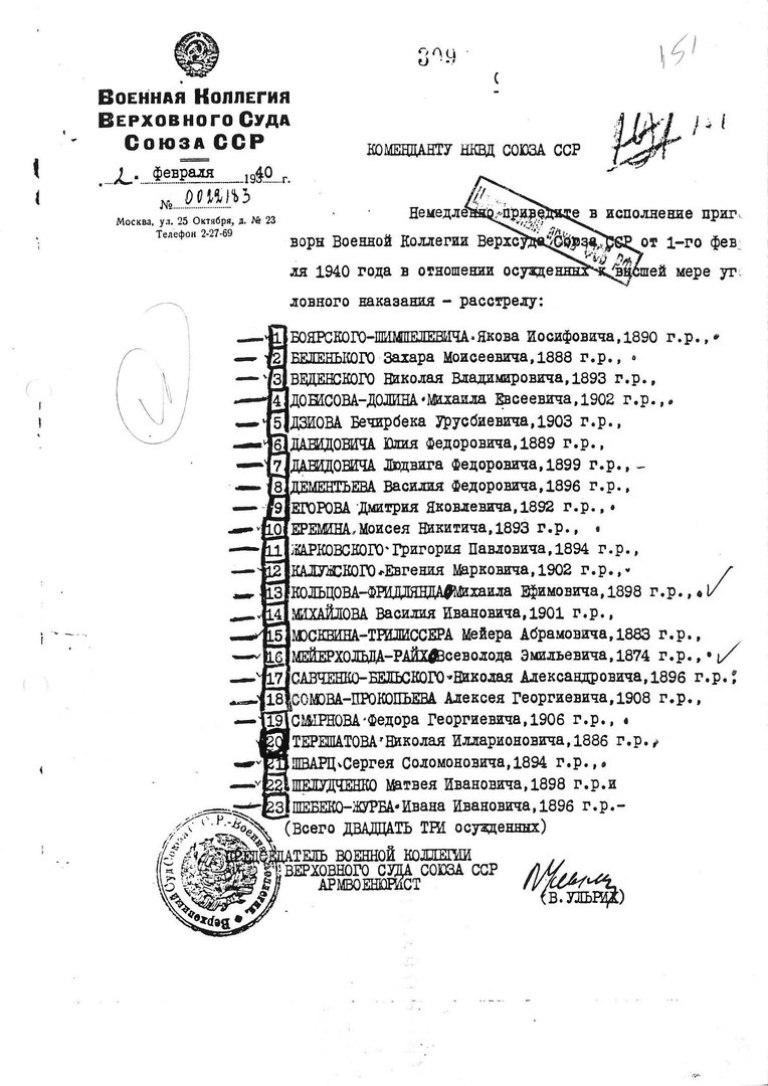
Execution order for Yacov Boyarsky, Mikhail Koltsov, Vsevolod Meyerhold and others, signed by Ulrikh

The Military Collegium of the Supreme Court of the Soviet Union (Russian: Военная коллегия Верховного суда СССР, romanized: Voennaya kollegiya Verkhovnogo suda SSSR) was created in 1924 by the Supreme Court of the Soviet Union as a court for the higher military and political personnel of the Red Army and Fleet. In addition it was an immediate supervisor of military tribunals and the supreme authority of military appeals.

During 1926–1948 the Chairman of the Collegium was Vasiliy Ulrikh.

The role of the Military Collegium drastically changed after June 1934, when it was assigned the duty to consider cases that fell under Article 58, counter-revolutionary activity.

During the Great Purge of 1937–1938 the Military Collegium tried relatively prominent figures, usually based on the lists approved personally by Joseph Stalin, the majority of Article 58 cases having been processed extrajudicially by NKVD troikas. In particular, the Military Collegium conducted the major Soviet show trials.

The Collegium was also involved in a subsequent trial of Polish General Leopold Okulicki, the last commander of the Polish Home Army, and Jan Stanisław Jankowski, Government Delegate for Poland.

== Chairmen ==
- 1923–1926: Valentin Trifonov
- 1926–1948: Vasiliy Ulrikh
- 1948–1957: Aleksandr Cheptsov
- 1957–1964: Viktor Borisoglebskiy
- 1964–1971: Nikolay Chistyakov

== See also ==
- Ministry of Justice of the Soviet Union
- Stalin's shooting lists
- Military Chamber of the Supreme Court of Russia
- Solovetsky Stone, a memorial to victims of Soviet repression, many of whom were executed under orders from the Military Collegium
