= Żakowski =

Żakowski [ˌʐakˈɔvski] (with its female form Żakowska [ˌʐakˈɔvska] and plural form Żakowscy [ˌʐakˈɔvst͡sɨ]) is a Polish surname. It was first recorded in 1391 and is a toponymic derived either from Żakowo or Żakowice, the names of several small Polish villages.

Notable people with the name Żakowski/Zakowski/Zakovsky include:

- Erich Zakowski (born 1934), German master mechanic
- Jacek Żakowski (born 1957), Polish journalist and author
- Leonid Zakovsky (1894–1938), Soviet politician of Latvian descent
- Peter Zakowski (born 1966), German racing driver
- Sławomir Żakowski (born 1963), Polish brigadier general
