= Andrei Zhdanov =

Soviet politician (1896–1948)

- Андрей Жданов
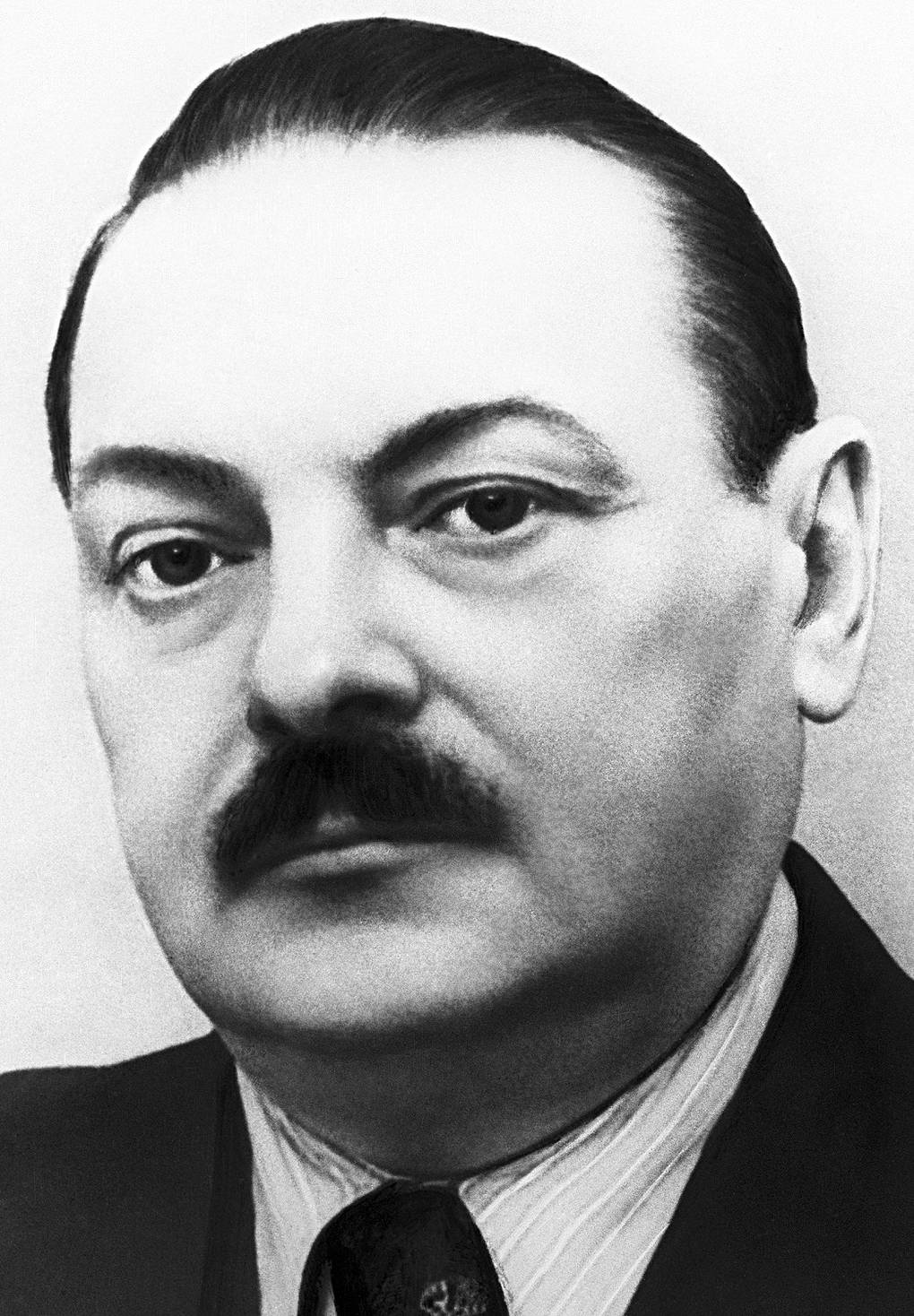
- Zhdanov in 1946

Second Secretary of the Communist Party of the Soviet Union
- In office 21 March 1939 – 31 August 1948
- Leader (Note: General Secretary of the Communist Party of the Soviet Union): Joseph Stalin
- Preceded by: Lazar Kaganovich
- Succeeded by: Georgy Malenkov

Head of the Propaganda and Agitation Dept. of the Central Committee
- In office 21 March 1939 – 6 September 1940
- Preceded by: Post established
- Succeeded by: Georgy Aleksandrov

Chairman of the Supreme Soviet of the Russian SFSR
- In office 15 July 1938 – 20 June 1947
- Preceded by: Post established
- Succeeded by: Mikhail Tarasov

First Secretary of the Leningrad Regional Committee of the Soviet Union
- In office 15 December 1934 – 17 January 1945
- Preceded by: Sergei Kirov
- Succeeded by: Alexey Kuznetsov

Personal details
- Born: Andrei Aleksandrovich Zhdanov; 26 February [O.S. 14 February] 1896 Mariupol, Mariupol uezd, Yekaterinoslav Governorate, Russian Empire
- Died: 31 August 1948 (aged 52) Moscow, Russian SFSR, Soviet Union
- Resting place: Kremlin Wall Necropolis, Moscow
- Party: All-Union Communist Party (Bolsheviks) (1918–1948)
- Other political affiliations: Russian Social Democratic Labour Party (Bolsheviks) (1915–1918)
- Children: Yuri
- Occupation: Civil servant
Awards
Order of Lenin	Order of Lenin	Order of the Red Banner
	Order of the Red Banner of Labour		Medal "For the Victory over Germany in the Great Patriotic War 1941–1945"
Several others (see below)

Military service
- Allegiance: Russian Empire (1916–1917); Russian Soviet Federative Socialist Republic (1917–1922); Soviet Union (1922–1948)
- Branch/service: Imperial Russian Army; Red Army; Soviet Armed Forces
- Years of service: 1918–1949
- Rank: Colonel general
- Battles/wars: World War II; Winter War; Invasion of Estonia; Eastern Front; Siege of Leningrad
- Central institution membership: 1939–1948: Full member, 18th Politburo; 1934–1939: Candidate member, 17th Politburo; 1934–1948: Member, 17th & 18th Secretariat; 1934–1948: Member, 17th & 18th Orgburo; 1930–1948: Full member, 16th and 17th Central Committee; 1925–1930: Candidate member, 14th and 15th Central Committee; Other political offices held: 1946–1947: Chairman, Soviet of the Union; 1944-1947: Director, Allied Control Commission

Andrei Aleksandrovich Zhdanov (Russian: Андрей Александрович Жданов, IPA: [ɐnˈdrʲej ɐlʲɪkˈsandrəvʲɪdʑ ˈʐdanəf]; 26 February [O.S. 14 February] 1896 – 31 August 1948) was a Soviet politician. He was the Soviet Union's "propagandist-in-chief" after the Second World War, and was responsible for developing the Soviet cultural policy, the Zhdanov Doctrine, which remained in effect until the death of Joseph Stalin. Zhdanov was considered Stalin's most likely successor but died before him.

Zhdanov joined the Bolsheviks in 1915 and quickly rose through the party ranks. A close associate of Stalin, he became a secretary of the Central Committee in 1934, and later that year he was promoted to Leningrad party chief following the assassination of Sergei Kirov. He would go on to play a major role during the Great Purge. In 1939, he was promoted to full membership of the Politburo and as head of the Central Committee's Propaganda Department. Zhdanov's political standing was undermined during the Second World War due to his association with the Soviet–Finnish War and the failed Molotov–Ribbentrop Pact. Nevertheless, he played a leading role in the Soviet takeover of Estonia and defense of Leningrad.

After the war, Zhdanov was tasked by Stalin with directing cultural policy. His campaign, known as the Zhdanovshchina, was strictly enforced and led to the denouncement of artists including Anna Akhmatova and Dmitri Shostakovich. He also oversaw the creation of the Cominform in 1947. Initially considered the successor-in-waiting to Stalin, Zhdanov suffered from ill health and fell out of favour as a result of the Tito–Stalin split. He died of heart failure in 1948, resulting in a rise in the political fortunes of Georgy Malenkov.

== Early life ==
Zhdanov was born on 26 February [O.S. 14 February] 1896 in Mariupol, Mariupol uezd, Yekaterinoslav Governorate, Russian Empire (now Ukraine), where his father, Alexander Alekseevich Zhdanov (1860–1909), was a school inspector. His maternal grandfather was the former rector of the Moscow Theological Academy. He studied at the Moscow Commercial Institute. In 1914, he was drafted into the Russian army, graduated from an officers' school and served in the reserves. He joined the Bolsheviks in 1915. In 1917, he was chairman of the Shadrinsk committee of the Bolsheviks. He was a political commissar in the Red Army during the Russian Civil War and was elected chairman of the Tver Governorate soviet in 1923. From 1924 to 1934, he was first secretary of the Nizhny Novgorod provincial party committee.

== Party secretary ==
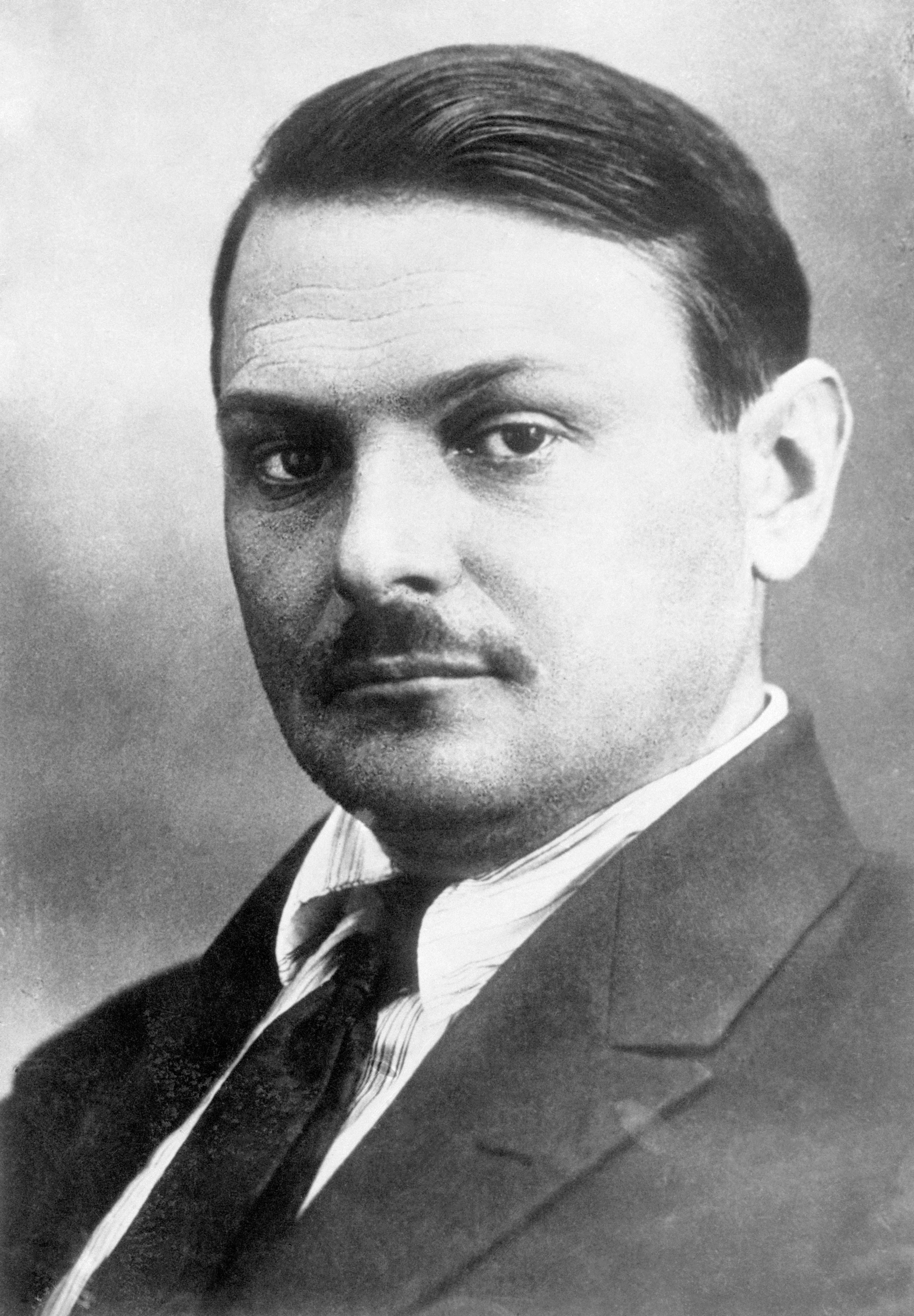
Zhdanov c. 1934

Zhdanov's first major promotion came at the end of the 17th Congress of the Communist Party of the Soviet Union, in February 1934, when he was transferred to Moscow as a secretary of the Central Committee, responsible for ideology. In that capacity, he inserted his protégé, Aleksandr Shcherbakov, as secretary of the Union of Soviet Writers, and gave the opening address to the first Soviet Writers' Congress in August 1934. In his speech, as well as paying tribute to "the guiding genius of our great leader and teacher, Comrade Stalin", he repeated Stalin's famous line that writers are "engineers of human souls". He declared that the only good literature was political:

Our Soviet literature is not afraid of the charge of being "tendentious". Yes, Soviet literature is tendentious, for in an epoch of class struggle there is not and cannot be a literature which is not class literature, not tendentious, allegedly non-political.

Zhdanov's second great promotion followed the assassination of Sergei Kirov in December 1934, when he succeeded Kirov as first secretary of the Leningrad (Saint Petersburg) provincial party and was co-opted as a candidate member of the Politburo. Early in 1935, he and the head of the Leningrad NKVD, Leonid Zakovsky, organised the deportation of 11,702 so-called "Leningrad aristocrats", people who had belonged to the nobility or the middle class before the revolution. They also hunted any current or former party members suspected of having supported Leon Trotsky or the former Leningrad party boss, Grigory Zinoviev.

=== Role in the Great Purge ===
Zhdanov has been described by J. Arch Getty as a key figure in the Great Purge, who advocated an approach that would make the party a vehicle for political education, ideological agitation and cadre preparation on a mass scale. Zhdanov's encouragement of rank-and-file mobilisation helped create momentum for the Great Terror. Though somewhat less active than Vyacheslav Molotov, Joseph Stalin, Lazar Kaganovich and Kliment Voroshilov, Zhdanov was a major perpetrator of the Great Terror and personally approved 176 documented execution lists. On a holiday with Stalin in August 1936, he co-signed the telegram that brought about the dismissal of the head of the NKVD, Genrikh Yagoda, who was accused, among other failings, of having impeded Zhdanov and Leonid Zakovsky in their purge of the Leningrad party organisation. During a Central Committee plenum in March 1937, Zhdanov announced that all provincial party secretaries were to be subject to re-election, a device that was used to remove them. Zhdanov was one of the few provincial party leaders in Russia to remain in post throughout the Great Purge.

In May 1937, he called leaders of the Leningrad party together to tell them that the long-time second secretary of the provincial party, Mikhail Chudov, and the former Mayor of Leningrad, Ivan Kodatsky, had been arrested. When an Old Bolshevik, Dora Lazurkina, went up to him afterwards to vouch for Kodatsky, Zhdanov warned her that such talk "will end badly for you". She was arrested and survived 17 years in the gulag.

=== After the Great Purge ===
In September 1938, Zhdanov was appointed head of the reorganised Central Committee Directorate for Propaganda and Agitation, which brought all branches of the news media and arts under centralised party control. He was also Chairman of the Supreme Soviet of the Russian Soviet Federative Socialist Republic from July 1938 to June 1947 and from 1938 he was on the military council of the Soviet Navy.

His rise coincided with the fall of Nikolai Yezhov. At the 18th Party Congress, Zhdanov noted that "other means apart from repression" could be used to enforce "state and labour discipline". Zhdanov gave a key speech in which he proposed "to abolish mass Party purges... now that the capitalist elements have been eliminated". He declared that the purges had been co-opted by "hostile elements" to "persecute and ruin honest people".

At the conclusion of the Congress in March 1939, Zhdanov was promoted to full membership of the Politburo. He was still one of four secretaries of the Central Committee (CC)—the others being Stalin, Andrey Andreyevich Andreyev, and Georgy Malenkov—but Malenkov was not a member of the Politburo, which meant that Zhdanov had replaced Lazar Kaganovich as Stalin's deputy in the party apparatus and appeared to be his most likely successor. By 4 May 1941, a Politburo decision expressly named Zhdanov as Stalin's deputy in the CC Secretariat.

On 29 June 1939, Zhdanov had a signed article in Pravda in which he expressed what he called his "personal" view "with which my friends do not agree" that Britain and France did not seriously want a military alliance with the Soviet Union. In retrospect, it was the first public hint of the Soviets signing the Molotov–Ribbentrop Pact three months later.

== Wartime ==
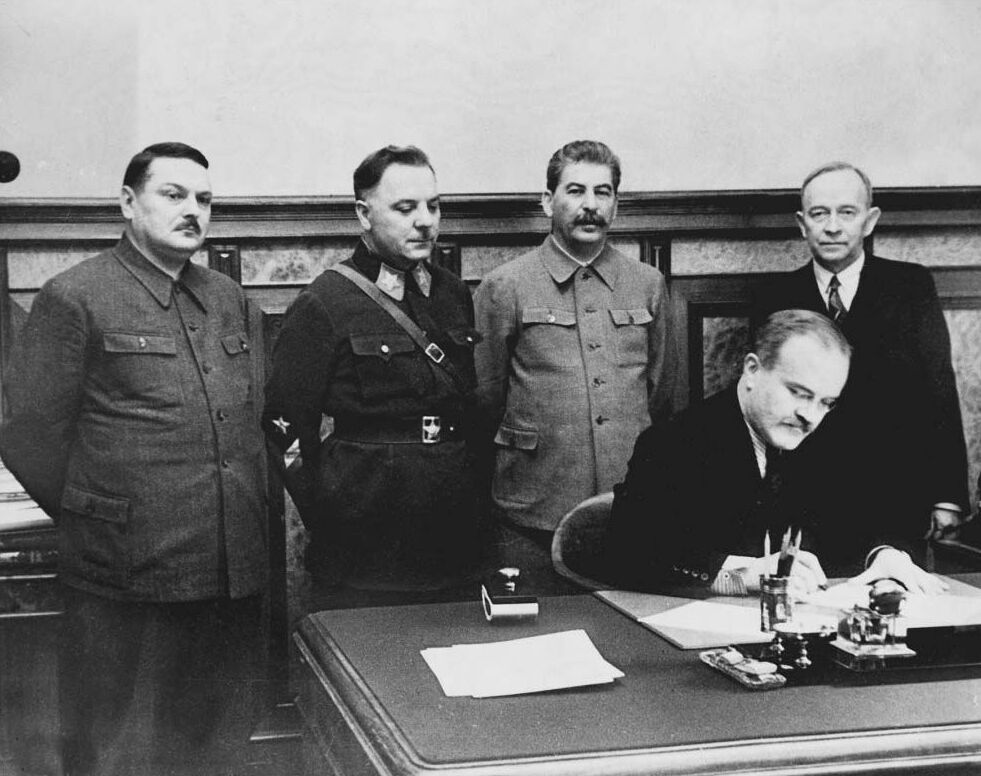
The Soviet leadership signs a treaty with the Finnish Democratic Republic, 1939 (Standing from left to right are Andrei Zhdanov, Kliment Voroshilov, Joseph Stalin and Otto Kuusinen; Vyacheslav Molotov is seated).

Zhdanov was very publicly associated with the decision to invade Finland in November 1939. In December, he signed the treaty between the Soviets and Finnish puppet government, headed by Otto Wille Kuusinen. As the Leningrad party boss and the official overseeing the navy, he had an interest in increasing the Soviet presence in the Baltic Sea at the expense of Finland, Estonia and Latvia. The final peace treaty between Finland and the Soviet Union was signed by Zhdanov on 12 March 1940.

In June 1940, Zhdanov was sent to Estonia to supervise the establishment of the Estonian Soviet Socialist Republic and its annexation by the Soviet Union. In the United States House of Representatives' 1953–1954 Kersten Committee investigation Zhdanov was one of the accused charged with the 1940 Soviet aggression and forced incorporation of the Baltic states into the USSR.

The Finnish debacle weakened Zhdanov's political standing. In September 1940 he was removed from direct control of the Propaganda Department of the Central Committee, which was taken over by Georgy Aleksandrov, an ally of his rival Malenkov. He was undermined further by the German invasion of the Soviet Union because he had been so publicly associated with the failed pact with Hitler. He was excluded from the State Defense Committee (GOKO), which directed the war effort and was initially controlled by Malenkov and Lavrentiy Beria. According to the historian Anton Antonov-Ovseenko:

Beria and Malenkov zealously sawed away at the chair holding Andrei Zhdanov, the first in line to succeed Stalin. They laid the groundwork for his transfer to the doomed city of Leningrad. No place was found for Zhdanov, Stalin's favourite, even when the State Defence Committee was revamped.

Along with Georgy Zhukov, Zhdanov took a leading role during the Siege of Leningrad in the Second World War. In August 1941, he created a City Defence Council but was ordered by Stalin to disband it. When the siege was lifted, he was not officially given credit for saving the city.

After the Moscow Armistice between Finland and the Soviet Union was signed on 4 September 1944, Zhdanov directed the Allied Control Commission in Finland to the Paris Peace Treaty in 1947. That meant that he had to spend several months in Helsinki and relinquish his position as head of the Leningrad party organisation, which he had held for nine years, but he was able to leave it in the hands of his ally, Alexey Kuznetsov. In January 1945, when Pravda celebrated the lifting of the Siege of Leningrad, it emphasised that Malenkov and Vyacheslav Molotov had been dispatched to the city in 1941 and implied that they shared the credit with Zhdanov.

== Post-war ascendancy ==
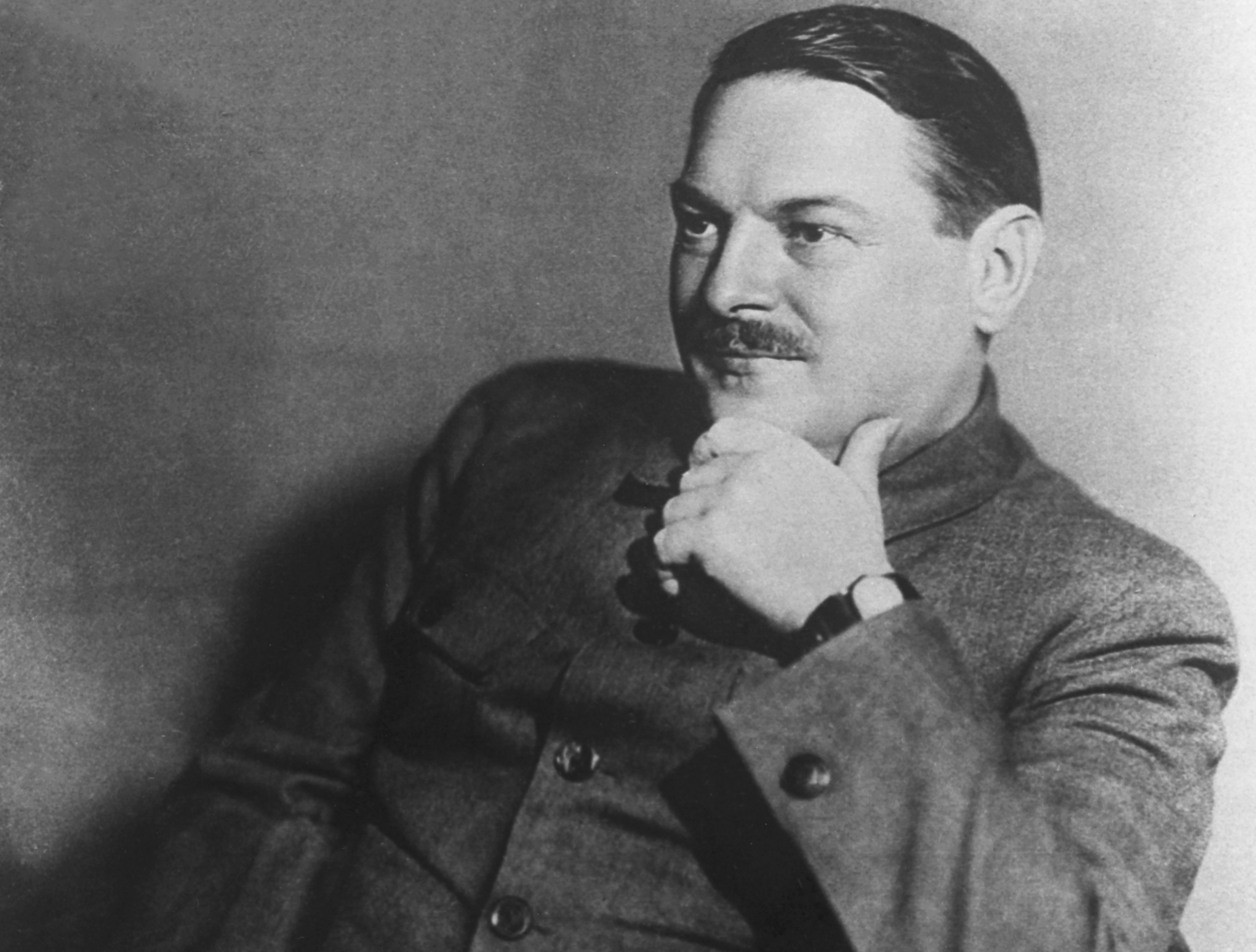
Zhdanov in 1941

Zhdanov made a political comeback during 1946, when his main rival, Malenkov, temporarily lost his position as a party secretary. For the next two years, he was delegated by Stalin to direct the Soviet Union's cultural policy and to handle relations with the Eastern European states under or coming under communist control. He formulated what became known as the Zhdanov Doctrine ("The only conflict that is possible in Soviet culture is the conflict between good and best"). In December 1946, he launched the attack on Anna Akhmatova and Mikhail Zoshchenko, two writers living in Zhdanov's former Leningrad fiefdom. He described Akhmatova, arguably then the greatest living Russian poet, as "half nun, half whore". Zhdanov was the founding editor-in-chief of the Agitprop journal Kultura i zhizn which he held until 1948.

Zhdanov's campaign resulted in the persecution of cutures of non-Russian peoples in the Soviet Union, in particular Jews. In Ukraine it was expressed in the critic of "bourgeois nationalism" and resulted in the condemnation of a number of Ukrainian authors and scientists, among them Andriy Malyshko, Yuriy Yanovskyi and Alexander Dovzhenko, as well as change of editors in the magazines Dnipro and Vitchyzna. Zhdanov's line demanded to achieve a "closer amalgamation" of Ukrainian culture with the Russian one.

In 1947, he organised the Cominform, which was designed to coordinate and control the communist parties around the world. At a famous speech at Szklarska Poręba in September 1947, Zhdanov warned his fellow communists that the world was now split into two hostile camps and that the Cominform was needed to oppose the "frank expansionist programme" of the US.

In January 1948, he presided over a three-day conference in the Kremlin, to which more than 70 composers, musicians and music critics, including Dmitri Shostakovich, Sergei Prokofiev, Aram Khachaturian, and Nikolai Myaskovsky were summoned to be lectured by Zhdanov on why they should avoid "formalism" in music. A persistent story is that Zhdanov played the piano during the conference to demonstrate how music should be written, but years later that story was furiously denied by Shostakovich, who attributed it to "toadies". Zhdanov's cultural policy rested on the Soviets' "critically assimilating the cultural heritage of all nations and all times" to "take what was most inspiring".

== Fall from power and later life ==
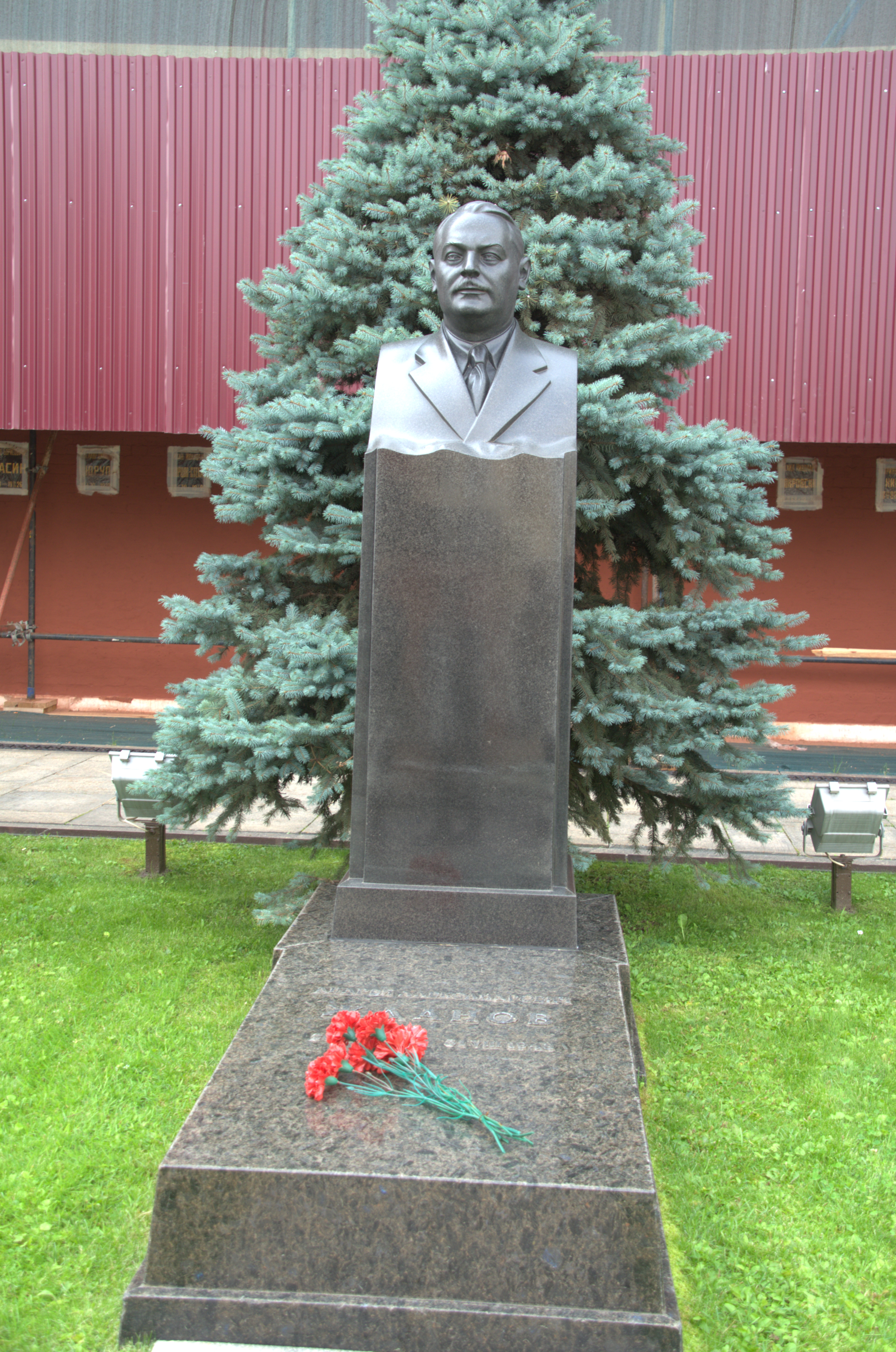
Zhdanov's tomb in the Kremlin Wall Necropolis

In June 1948, Stalin sent Zhdanov to the Cominform meeting in Bucharest. Its purpose was to condemn Yugoslavia, but Zhdanov took a more restrained line than his co-delegate and rival, Georgy Malenkov. That infuriated Stalin, who removed Zhdanov from all his posts and replaced him with Malenkov. Zhdanov was soon transferred to a sanatorium.

== Death ==
Zhdanov died on 31 August 1948 in Moscow of heart failure. Zhdanov was buried in the Kremlin Wall Necropolis, in one of the twelve individual tombs located between the Lenin's Mausoleum and the Moscow Kremlin Wall.

== Legacy ==
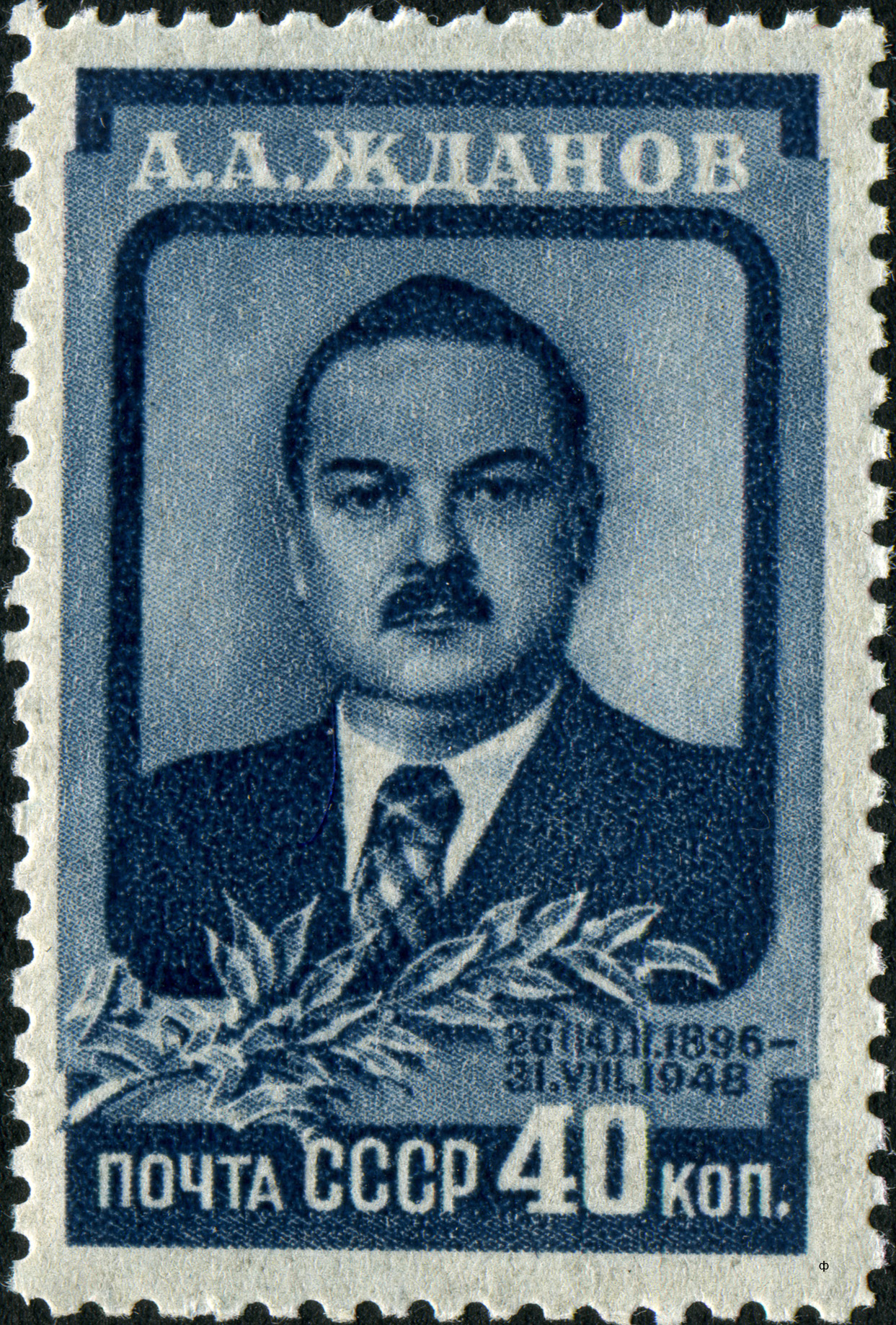
Soviet postage stamp with the image of Zhdanov

Despite his bullying of Akhmatova, Shostakovich, Prokofiev and other cultural figures, and the apparent threat that the founding of Cominform posed to peace, Zhdanov is reckoned by many Soviet scholars to have been a "moderate" within the context of the post-war Stalinist regime. The worst events of Stalin's final years, such as the rift with Yugoslavia, the Leningrad affair, the show trials in Bulgaria, Hungary and Czechoslovakia, and the anti-Semitic Doctors' plot all occurred after Zhdanov was dead. The Leningrad Affair was a brutal purge of Zhdanov's former allies, notably Kuznetsov and Nikolai Voznesensky. The most notable survivor of that purge was future Prime Minister Alexei Kosygin.

In Khrushchev Remembers, Nikita Khrushchev recalled that Zhdanov was an alcoholic and that during his last days, Stalin would shout at him to stop drinking and insist on him drinking only fruit juice. Stalin had talked of Zhdanov being his successor, but Zhdanov's ill health gave his rivals in the Politburo Lavrentiy Beria, Georgy Malenkov, and Nikita Khrushchev, an opportunity to undermine him. Stalin would later blame Zhdanov's death on Kremlin doctors and "Zionist" conspirators.

== Zhdanovshchina ==
Zhdanovshchina was the emphasis on purified communist ideology developed during the war by Zhdanov. It emerged from his arguments inside the party hierarchy opposing the pragmatist faction of Georgy Malenkov. Malenkov stressed the universal values of science and engineering, and proposed to promote the technological experts to the highest positions in the Soviet administrative elite. Zhdanov's faction said proper ideology trumped science and called for prioritizing political education and ideological purity.

However, the technocrats had proven amazingly successful during the war in terms of engineering, industrial production, and the development of advanced munitions. Zhdanov sought to use the ideological purification of the party as a vehicle to restore the Kremlin's political control over the provinces and the technocrats. He worried that the provincial party bosses and the heads of the economic ministries had achieved too high a degree of autonomy during the war, when the top leadership realized the urgent necessity of maximum mobilization of human and material resources. The highest priority in the post-war era was physical reconstruction after the massive wartime destruction.

The same argument that strengthened the technocrats continued to operate, and the united opposition of Malenkov, the technocrats, the provincial party bosses, and the key ministries doomed Zhdanov's proposals. He therefore pivoted to devote his attention to purification of the arts and culture.

== Cultural standards ==
Originating in 1946 and lasting until the late 1950s, Zhdanov's ideological code, known as the Zhdanov Doctrine or Zhdanovism (zhdanovshchina), defined cultural production in the Soviet Union. Zhdanov intended to create a new philosophy of artistic creation valid for the entire world. His method reduced all of culture to a sort of chart, wherein a given symbol corresponded to a simple moral value.

Zhdanov and his associates further sought to eliminate foreign influence from Soviet art, proclaiming that "incorrect art" was an ideological diversion. This doctrine suggested that the world was split into two opposing camps, namely the "imperialistic", led by the United States; and the "democratic", led by the Soviet Union. The one sentence that came to define his doctrine was "The only conflict that is possible in Soviet culture is the conflict between good and best".

This cultural policy became strictly enforced, censoring writers, artists and the intelligentsia, with punishment being applied for failing to conform to what was considered acceptable by Zhdanov's standards. This policy officially ended in 1952, seen as having a negative impact on culture within the Soviet Union. The origins of this policy can be seen before 1946 when critics proposed (wrongly according to Zhdanov) that Russian classics had been influenced by famous foreign writers, but the policy came into effect specifically to target "apolitical, 'bourgeois', individualistic works of the satirist Mikhail Zoshchenko and the poet Anna Akhmatova", respectively writing for the literary magazines Zvezda and Leningrad. On 20 February 1948, Zhdanovshchina shifted its focus towards anti-formalism, targeting composers such as Dmitri Shostakovich. That April, many of the persecuted composers were pressed into repenting for displaying formalism in their music in a special congress of the Union of Soviet Composers.

Zhdanov was the most openly cultured of the leadership group and his treatment of artists was mild by Soviet standards of the time. He even wrote a satirical sketch ridiculing the attack on modernism.

== Family ties ==
Zhdanov's son Yuri (1919–2006) married Stalin's daughter Svetlana Alliluyeva in 1949. She described the Zhdanov household as imbued with "an inveterate spirit of bourgeois acquisitiveness ... There were trunkloads of possessions ... The place was presided over by Zinaida Zhdanova, the widow, and the ultimate embodiment of this mixture of Party bigotry and the complacency of the bourgeois woman." In 1952, Yuri Zhdanov was raised to membership of the Central Committee of the Communist Party of the Soviet Union, as head of its Department of Science and Culture, but was sacked very soon after Stalin's death. That marriage ended in divorce in 1952. They had one daughter, Yekaterina.

== Honours and awards ==
- Two Orders of Lenin (March 15, 1935, February 25, 1946)
- Order of the Red Banner (March 21, 1940)
- Order of Suvorov, 1st class (February 21, 1944)
- Order of Kutuzov, 1st class (July 29, 1944)
- Order of the Red Banner of Labour (April 4, 1939)
- Medal "For the Defence of Leningrad"
- Medal "For the Victory over Germany in the Great Patriotic War 1941–1945"
- Medal "For Valiant Labour in the Great Patriotic War 1941–1945"
- Medal "In Commemoration of the 800th Anniversary of Moscow"

Zhdanov's birthplace, Mariupol, was renamed Zhdanov in his honor at Joseph Stalin's instigation in 1948 and a monument to Zhdanov was built in the central square of the city. The name reverted to Mariupol in 1989 and the monument was dismantled in 1990.

== See also ==
- Outline of the Russian Revolution and Civil War
- Bibliography of the Russian Revolution and Civil War
- Bibliography of Stalinism and the Soviet Union
- Index of Old Bolsheviks
- Index of articles related to the Russian Revolution and Civil War
- Engineers of the human soul
- Socialist realism
- Doctors' plot

== Sources ==
- Antonov-Ovseyenko, Anton (1983). The Time of Stalin, Portrait of a Tyranny. New York: Harper Colophon. ISBN 0-06-039027-1.
- Boterbloem, Kees (2004). The Life and Times of Andrei Zhdanov, 1896-1948. McGill-Queen's University Press. ISBN 0-7735-2666-8.
- Clark, Katerina; Dobrenko, Evgeny (2007). Soviet Culture and Power, A History in Documents, 1917–1953. New Haven: Yale University Press. ISBN 978-0-300-10646-6.
- Fitzpatrick, Sheila (2015). On Stalin's Team. Melbourne University Press.
- Getty, John A. (1987). Origins of the Great Purges: The Soviet Communist Party Reconsidered, 1933–1938. Cambridge University Press. ISBN 0-521-33570-1.
- Getty, J. Arch; Naumov, Oleg V. (1999). The Road to Terror: Stalin and the Self-Destruction of the Bolsheviks, 1932–1939. New Haven: Yale University Press. ISBN 0-300-07772-6.
- Groys, Boris (2011) [1992]. The Total Art of Stalinism: Avant-Garde, Aesthetic Dictatorship, and Beyond. Verso. ISBN 978-1-84467-809-9.
- Hahn, Werner G. (1982). Postwar Soviet Politics, The Fall of Zhdanov and the Defeat of Moderation, 1946–53. Ithaca, N.Y.: Cornell University Press. p. 20. ISBN 0-8014-1410-5.
- Haslam, Jonathan (2011). Russia's Cold War. Yale University Press. ISBN 978-0-300-15997-4.
- McSmith, Andy (2015). Fear and the Muse Kept Watch, the Russian Masters – from Akhmatova and Pasternak to Shostakovich and Eisenstein – Under Stalin. New York: New Press. ISBN 978-1-59558-056-6.
- Montefiore, Simon Sebag (2004). Stalin: The Court of the Red Tsar. Alfred A. Knopf, Inc. ISBN 1-4000-4230-5.
- Ra'anan, Gavriel D. (1983). International Policy Formation in the USSR: Factional 'Debates' during the Zhdanovshchina. Hamden, Connecticut: Archon. ISBN 0-208-01976-6.
- Rees, Edward Arfon (2003). Rees, E. A. (ed.). The nature of Stalin's dictatorship: the Politburo, 1928–1953. Basingstoke: Palgrave Macmillan. p. 34. doi:10.1057/9780230524286. ISBN 1403904014. Archived from the original on 4 December 2023.
- Zubok, V.M.; Pleshakov, Konstantin (1996). Inside the Kremlin's Cold War: From Stalin to Khrushchev. Harvard University Press. ISBN 9780674455320.

Party political offices
Preceded by Sergei Kirov	First Secretary of the Leningrad Regional Committee of the Communist Party of the Soviet Union; 1934–1945	Succeeded by Alexey Kuznetsov
Preceded by Pavel Postyshev	Senior Secretary of Ideology of the Communist Party of the Soviet Union; 1934–1948	Succeeded by Mikhail Suslov
Preceded by Lazar Kaganovich	Second Secretary of the Communist Party of the Soviet Union 1939–1948	Succeeded by Georgy Malenkov
Political offices
Preceded by None	Chairman of the Supreme Soviet of Russia; 1938–1947	Succeeded by Mikhail Tarasov
Preceded by Andrey Andreyev	Chairman of the Soviet of the Union; 1946–1947	Succeeded by Ivan Parfenov
