= Ktery, Łódź Voivodeship =

Ktery may refer to two villages within Kutno County, Łódź Voivodeship, in central Poland:

- Ktery
- Nowe Ktery
