= Dora Lazurkina =

Russian revolutionary

- Дора Лазуркина

Personal details
- Born: Dora Abramovna Lazurkina; 25 April 1884 Novozybkov, Russian Empire
- Died: 24 January 1974 (aged 89) Leningrad, Russian Soviet Federative Socialist Republic, Soviet Union
- Party: Russian Social Democratic Labour Party (Bolsheviks) (1902–1912); Russian Communist Party (1912–1974)
- Awards: Order of Lenin

Dora Abramovna Lazurkina was a Russian revolutionary who was active in the October Revolution. Between 1918 and 1922 she acted as the director of the preschool division of the People's Commissariat for Education, underneath Anatoly Lunacharsky. From 1922 to 1932 she was active in the Leningrad Regional Committee under the leadership of Sergei Kirov, and from 1932 to 1934 she was deputy secretary of the Leningrad Party Control Commission.

She was arrested and sentenced to five years of exile in 1937; her sentence was later changed to imprisonment in the Gulag and extended indefinitely. She was released in 1955 and subsequently rehabilitated.

== Early life ==
Lazurkina was born on May 6 (April 24 according to the old style), 1884 in Novozybkov, Chernihiv Governorate, to a Jewish family. Her father was a forester.

At the age of nine, she entered the Novozybkov Women's Gymnasium, from which she graduated with a gold medal. At the age of 15, she joined the local social-democratic circle, where she performed technical tasks.

After completing her formal education, she went to work at the match factory of M. Volkov. After leaving Novozybkov, she became the head of the public school in Mozyr, Minsk Governorate. She was a fan of the heroes of the novels "What Is to Be Done?" by Nikolay Chernyshevsky and "The Gadfly" by Ethel Voynich.

== Introduction to revolutionary politics ==
In 1900-1902 she studied pedagogy at the Froebel Pedagogical Institute and natural science under Peter Lesgaft in Saint Petersburg. In these student circles, she became acquainted with "Das Kapital" by Karl Marx and articles by Vladimir Lenin, then became engaged in revolutionary propaganda work among workers, teaching at workers' circles at the Baltic Shipyard and the Putilov factory and distributing the newspaper "Iskra".

In 1902 she joined the Russian Social Democratic Labour Party ("RSDLP"), adopting a party pseudonym of Sonya. In May of the same year, she was arrested for organising a May Day demonstration, spent eight months in prison, was exiled under police supervision to Novozybkov, and then left for Odessa, where she changed her surname and went underground, becoming a professional revolutionary.

Working as a propagandist in Odessa, in 1903 she was arrested at one of the meetings of the local party committee and sent to prison, from which she was released on bail seven months later on the condition that she not return to Saint Petersburg for a period of five years. There, in Odessa, she met the professional revolutionary Mikhail Semyonovich Lazurkin (party pseudonym Boris), whom she married in 1906.

Soon, on the instructions of the party committee, she went to work in Nikolaev, then was sent to Yekaterinoslav. When she was identified as a member of the party committee by a police agent in 1904 she was forced to hide, wearing a peasant dress and using someone else's passport, then leaving for Geneva. It was there, at the age of 19, she first met Lenin, living for eight months in an apartment with the Ulyanovs and imbued with Bolshevism under his influence.

== Return to Russia ==
The day after receiving news of Bloody Sunday, on January 10, 1905, she went to St. Petersburg, and then to Odessa, on behalf of Lenin, where she became a liaison with the Foreign Bureau of the Central Committee of the RSDLP. She worked as a propagandist and organizer, but was arrested by the police and exiled to the Arkhangelsk Governorate.

She soon escaped from her exile, then arrived in Moscow, where she took part in a party conference, at which she was arrested and sent to Butyrka prison. After being released from prison on October 17, 1905, she relocated to St. Petersburg's Vyborgsky district, where she was a member of the committee, while working as an organizer and propagandist.

On December 12, 1905, she spoke at the Nobel factory to the workers of the Vyborg side, calling for a strike and support for Moscow. After the rally, together with members of the committee, she went out to Samsonievskaya Street, where there was a shootout with a policeman, who was killed by someone from the crowd. She was charged with murder and sentenced to one year in prison. In 1906 she was exiled to the Vyatka Governorate, from which she fled to St. Petersburg.

In 1906-1907 she worked in Saint Petersburg in the party organizations of the Narva and Vasileostrovsky districts. In 1907, she was again arrested and sent to prison, from which she was released in 1908. In 1910, a son, Viktor, was born in the Lazurkins' family, and in 1912, a daughter, Yulia. After graduating from the Froebel Pedagogical Institute, Dora Lazurkina began to participate in pedagogical societies and teach. During the years before 1917, she worked in a newspaper, organized parties, and participated in raising money for the press.

== Revolutionary and pedagogical activities ==
After the victory of the February Revolution of 1917, she worked as an organizer of the 1st city district, was a member of the Petrograd Committee of the RSDLP (b) and the Petrograd Central City Duma, and a delegate to the VII (April) All-Russian Conference of the RSDLP (b). She was friends with Nadezhda Krupskaya, Felix Dzerzhinsky, Sergei Kirov, Sergo Ordzhonikidze, and Anatoly Lunacharsky.

In December 1918, she was removed from party work and moved to the People's Commissariat for Education ("Narkompros" or Наркомпрос) as head of the preschool department, organizing preschool education and becoming a member of the state commission for public education.

In 1922, at her own request, she was transferred to Petrograd, where in 1922-1928 she was the head of the regional party school and a member of the Leningrad regional party control commission. In 1928, on the recommendation of the Leningrad Regional Committee, the Central Committee of the Party appointed Lazurkina to the post of director of the Leningrad State Pedagogical Institute.

Without an academic title, in a short time she set up work on the preparation of qualified teaching staff, the organization of a number of new faculties, the revision of curricula and programs, and the involvement of public figures and students in the council of the institute, and was active in publicizing the institute's work through its newspaper. In 1932-1934 she worked as Deputy Secretary of the Party Collegium of the Regional Control Commission.

In January 1934 she was a delegate to the 17th Congress of the All-Union Communist Party (Bolsheviks)--which later acquired the nickname "the Executed Congress". After Kirov's assassination she was expelled from the party, but then reinstated. In 1934-1937, she headed the department of schools of the Leningrad City Committee of the All-Union Communist Party of Bolsheviks.

== Exile and imprisonment ==
In May 1937, one of Stalin's closest allies, Andrei Zhdanov, called leaders of the Leningrad party together to tell them that the long-time second secretary of the provincial party, Mikhail Chudov, and the former Mayor of Leningrad, Ivan Kodatsky, had been arrested. When Lazurkina went up to him afterwards to vouch for Kodatsky, Zhdanov warned her that such talk "will end badly for you".

On August 8, 1937, she was arrested. Her husband was also expelled from the party, then arrested, and finally executed during interrogation by the NKVD, who tried to make his death appear to be a suicide.

She was initially sentenced to five years of exile for "participation in a counter-revolutionary organization". In 1939 she was sentenced to eight years in labor camps, then in 1949 to exile in a settlement.

== Release and rehabilitation ==
She was finally released and rehabilitated in 1955; she was later awarded the Order of Lenin in 1956, and again in 1967 on the 50th anniversary of the October Revolution. While she was granted a pension and elected as a delegate to party congresses, she was traumatized by her years of imprisonment and exile: until the end of her life she was tormented by nightmares, in which she dreamed of tortures, beatings, and surveillance.

At the 22nd Party Congress in 1961, she gave a speech, which was received with thunderous applause, in which she detailed a dream she had supposedly had in which Lenin told her he did not want Joseph Stalin's body lying next to his:

I always carry Ilyich in my heart and always, comrades, in the most difficult moments, I survived only because I had Ilyich in my heart and I consulted with him what to do. Yesterday I consulted with Ilyich, as if he stood before me as if alive and said: it is unpleasant for me to be next to Stalin, who brought so much trouble to the party.

While some diehard Stalinists, such as Vyacheslav Molotov, dismissed her as a "witch", the Congress unanimously adopted a resolution to remove Stalin's body from Lenin's Mausoleum and reburied in the Kremlin Wall Necropolis. Lazurkina's speech and the resulting actions are regarded as having aided Nikita Khrushchev's continued drive towards De-Stalinization.

In 1971, she dictated her memoirs. She had a heightened sense of justice, and expressed her disagreement with conferring the title of Hero of the Soviet Union to Leonid Brezhnev. She proposed limiting privileges for party workers, as a result of which she was no longer invited to party events; the 70th anniversary of her joining the party passed without any form of commemoration.

She died on January 24, 1974, in Leningrad at the age of 89, exactly 50 years after the death of Lenin, whom she revered. She was buried at the Theological Cemetery at the cenotaph of her husband.

== Personal life ==
Her husband, Mikhail Semenovich Lazurkin (1883-1937), was director of the Polytechnic Institute (1930-1933) and director of Leningrad State University (1933-1937) until his arrest and murder. Her daughter Yulia Mikhailovna Lazurkina (1912–1977) was associate professor of the department of pedagogy of the Leningrad State Pedagogical Institute. Her son Viktor Mikhailovich Lazurkin (1910-1992) was an Arctic geologist.
