= Waly =

Waly or WALY may refer to:

== People ==
- Ghada Waly (born 1965), Egyptian politician
- Pape Waly Faye (born 1992), Senegalese football player
- Waly Coulibaly (born 1988), Malian basketball player
- Waly Dia (born 1988), French comedian
- Waly Salomão (1943–2003), Brazilian poet
- Yousef Wali, Egyptian politician

== Places ==
- Waly, Meuse, Grand Est, France
- Wały, Lower Silesian Voivodeship, Poland
- Wały, Nidzica County, Poland
- Wały, Szczytno County, Poland
- Wały A, Kutno County, Poland
- Wały B, Kutno County, Poland
- Waly Diantang, Mauritania
- Waly, Burkina Faso

== Other ==
- WALY (FM), a radio station in Altoona, Pennsylvania, United States
- WQWY, a radio station in Bellwood, Pennsylvania, United States, formerly known as WALY
- WNRS (AM), a radio station in Herkimer, New York, United States, formerly known as WALY

== See also ==
- Wally (given name)
