= Rybie =

Rybie may refer to the following places:

- Rybie, Łódź Voivodeship (central Poland)
- Rybie, Lublin Voivodeship (east Poland)
- Rybie, Gostynin County in Masovian Voivodeship (central Poland)
- Rybie, Pruszków County in Masovian Voivodeship (east-central Poland)
- Rybie, Greater Poland Voivodeship (central Poland)
