= Brony (disambiguation) =

A brony (plural: bronies) is an adult fan of the My Little Pony: Friendship Is Magic franchise.

Brony or Bronies may also refer to:

- Works about the fan base:
  - Bronies: The Extremely Unexpected Adult Fans of My Little Pony, 2012 documentary film
  - A Brony Tale, 2014 documentary film
- Brönies, fried meat patties made in the Shetland Islands
- Brony, Łódź Voivodeship, village in Poland

== See also ==
- Bronny James (LeBron James Jr.), American basketball player
- Broni, a municipality in Lombardy, Italy
- Bro (disambiguation)
- Brownie (disambiguation)
