= Malewo =

Malewo may refer to the following places:

- Malewo, Greater Poland Voivodeship (west-central Poland)
- Malewo, Łódź Voivodeship (central Poland)
- Malewo, Masovian Voivodeship (east-central Poland)
- Malewo, Pomeranian Voivodeship (north Poland)
