= Mieczysławów =

Mieczysławów may refer to the following places:

- Mieczysławów, Łódź Voivodeship (central Poland)
- Mieczysławów, Masovian Voivodeship (east-central Poland)
- Mieczysławów, Świętokrzyskie Voivodeship (south-central Poland)
