= Kaszewy-Kolonia =

- Village
- Location within Poland
- Coordinates: 52°12′17″N 19°28′12″E
- Country: Poland
- Voivodeship: Łódź
- County: Kutno
- Gmina: Krzyżanów
- Elevation: 107 m (351 ft)
- Population (2021 consensus): 94

Kaszewy-Kolonia [kaˈʂɛvɨ kɔˈlɔɲa] is a village in the administrative district of Gmina Krzyżanów, within Kutno County, Łódź Voivodeship, in central Poland. It lies approximately 3 km (2 mi) north-east of Krzyżanów, 8 km (5 mi) south-east of Kutno, and 47 km (29 mi) north of the regional capital Łód

== Demographics ==
In a 2021 consensus, the population of the village has a reported population of 94.The percentage of males to females in 2021 was reported to be 51.1% males and 48.9% females.

Population consensus (2011)	Population consensus (2021)	Increase
83	94	+13.3%
