= Pawłowice, Łódź Voivodeship =

Pawłowice
- Village
- Location within Poland
- Coordinates: 52°10′17″N 19°28′31″E
- Country: Poland
- Voivodeship: Łódź
- County: Kutno
- Gmina: Krzyżanów

Pawłowice [pavwɔˈvit͡sɛ] is a village in the administrative district of Gmina Krzyżanów, within Kutno County, Łódź Voivodeship, in central parts of Poland.
