= Gmina Krzyżanów =

Gmina Krzyżanów Krzyżanów Commune
- Gmina
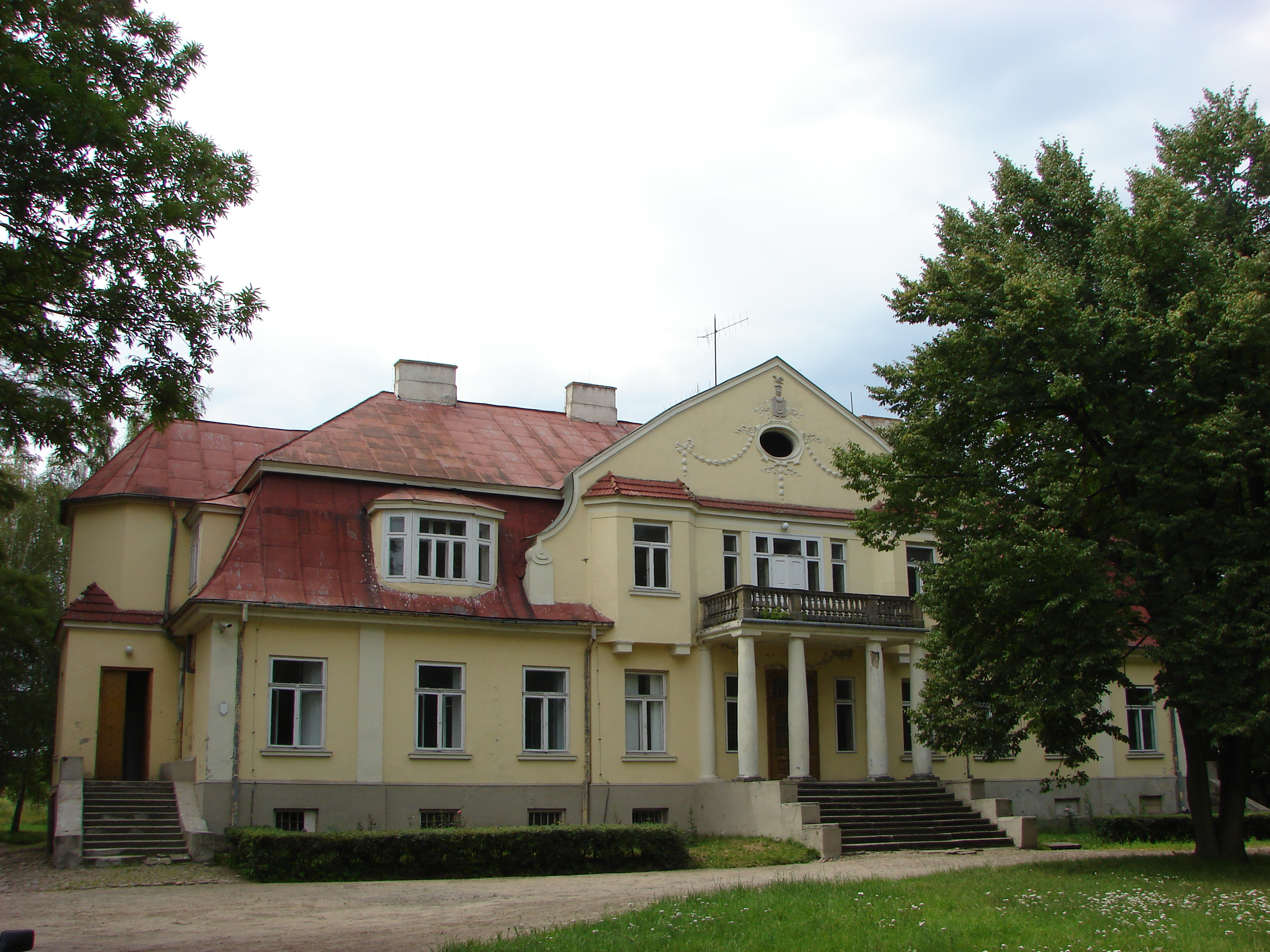
- Interactive map of Gmina Krzyżanów
- Coordinates (Krzyżanów): 52°11′9″N 19°26′51″E
- Country: Poland
- Voivodeship: Łódź
- County: Kutno
- Seat: Krzyżanów

Area
  - Total: 102.98 km^{2} (39.76 sq mi)

Population (2006)
  - Total: 4,468
  - Density: 43.39/km^{2} (112.4/sq mi)
- Time zone: UTC+1 (CET)
  - Summer (DST): UTC+2 (CEST)
- Website: krzyzanow.pl

Gmina Krzyżanów is a rural gmina (administrative district) in Kutno County, Łódź Voivodeship, in central Poland. Its seat is the village of Krzyżanów, which lies 8 kilometres (5 mi) south-east of Kutno and 45 km (28 mi) north of the regional capital Łódź.

The gmina covers an area of 102.98 square kilometres (39.8 sq mi), and as of 2006 its total population is 4,468.

== Villages ==
Gmina Krzyżanów contains the villages and settlements of:

- Brony
- Goliszew
- Julianów
- Kaszewy Dworne
- Kaszewy Kościelne
- Kaszewy Tarnowskie
- Kaszewy-Kolonia
- Kaszewy-Spójnia
- Konary
- Krzyżanów
- Krzyżanówek
- Ktery A
- Ktery B
- Ktery SK
- Kuchary
- Łęki Górne
- Łęki Kościelne
- Łęki Kościelne SK
- Malewo
- Marcinów
- Micin
- Mieczysławów
- Młogoszyn
- Pawłowice
- Psurze
- Różanowice
- Rustów
- Rybie
- Siemienice
- Siemieniczki
- Sokół
- Stefanów
- Świniary
- Uroczysko Leśne
- Wały A
- Wały B
- Wierzyki
- Władysławów
- Wojciechowice Duże
- Wojciechowice Małe
- Wyręby Siemienickie
- Żakowice
- Zawady
- Zieleniew
- Złotniki

== Neighbouring gminas ==
Gmina Krzyżanów is bordered by the gminas of Bedlno, Góra Świętej Małgorzaty, Kutno, Oporów, Piątek and Witonia.
