= Secretariat of the 17th Congress of the All-Union Communist Party (Bolsheviks) =

The Secretariat of the 17th Congress of the All-Union Communist Party (Bolsheviks) was in session from 1934 to 1939.

== Secretariat ==
Name (birth–death)	Took office	Left office	Duration	Note
Andrey Andreyev (1895–1971)	28 February 1935	21 March 1939	4 years, 21 days	Elected at the 5th Plenary Session.
Andrei Zhdanov (1896–1948)	10 February 1934	21 March 1939	5 years, 39 days	—
Lazar Kaganovich (1893–1991)	10 February 1934	21 March 1939	5 years, 39 days	—
Sergey Kirov (1886–1934)	10 February 1934	1 December 1934	294 days	Was murdered by an unknown assailant.
Joseph Stalin (1878–1953)	10 February 1934	21 March 1939	5 years, 39 days	—
Nikolai Yezhov (1895–1940)	1 February 1935	3 March 1939	4 years, 30 days	Elected at the 4th Plenary Session.
