= Łęki Górne, Łódź Voivodeship =

Łęki Górne
- Village
- Location within Poland
- Coordinates: 52°9′49″N 19°29′2″E
- Country: Poland
- Voivodeship: Łódź
- County: Kutno
- Gmina: Krzyżanów

Łęki Górne (Polish pronunciation: [ˈwɛŋkʲi ˈɡurnɛ]) is a village in the administrative district of Gmina Krzyżanów, within Kutno County, Łódź Voivodeship, in central Poland.
