= Kaszewy Tarnowskie =

- Village
- Location within Poland
- Coordinates: 52°12′43″N 19°29′30″E
- Country: Poland
- Voivodeship: Łódź
- County: Kutno
- Gmina: Krzyżanów

Kaszewy Tarnowskie [kaˈʂɛvɨ tarˈnɔfskʲɛ] is a village in the administrative district of Gmina Krzyżanów, within Kutno County, Łódź Voivodeship, in central Poland.
