= Zawady, Kutno County =

Zawady
- Village
- Location within Poland
- Coordinates: 52°12′13″N 19°23′52″E
- Country: Poland
- Voivodeship: Łódź
- County: Kutno
- Gmina: Krzyżanów
- Population: 60

Zawady [zaˈvadɨ] is a village in the administrative district of Gmina Krzyżanów, within Kutno County, Łódź Voivodeship, in central Poland.
