= Żakowice =

Żakowice may refer to the following places:

- Żakowice, Kuyavian-Pomeranian Voivodeship (north-central Poland)
- Żakowice, Kutno County in Łódź Voivodeship (central Poland)
- Żakowice, Łódź East County in Łódź Voivodeship (central Poland)
- Żakowice, Greater Poland Voivodeship (west-central Poland)
- Żakowice, Warmian-Masurian Voivodeship (north Poland)
