= Micin =

- Village
- Location within Poland
- Coordinates: 52°9′35″N 19°27′20″E
- Country: Poland
- Voivodeship: Łódź
- County: Kutno
- Gmina: Krzyżanów

Micin [ˈmit͡ɕin] is a village in the administrative district of Gmina Krzyżanów, within Kutno County, Łódź Voivodeship, in central Poland.
