= Kultura i zhizn =

Propaganda magazine in the Soviet Union (1946–1951)

- Editor-in-chief: Andrei Zhdanov (1946–1948); P. A. Satyukov
- Categories: Cultural magazine; Propaganda magazine
- Frequency: Three times per month
- Founded: 1946
- First issue: 28 June 1946
- Final issue: 28 February 1951
- Country: Soviet Union
- Based in: Moscow
- Language: Russian
- OCLC: 39034636

Kultura i zhizn (Russian: Культура и жизнь, lit. 'Culture and Life') was a cultural magazine which was published in the period 1946–1951 in Moscow, Soviet Union. It was one of the publications of the Central Committee of the Communist Party.

== History and profile ==
Kultura i zhizn was first published on 28 June 1946. It was started by the Administration of Agitation and Propaganda Department (abbreviated as Agitprop) of the Central Committee of the CPSU. Soon after its start the magazine became the principal media outlet for the ideologists of the party. The goals of Kultura i zhizn were reported as follows: "to develop Bolshevist criticism of defects in different branches of the economy and cultural life and to carry on an unyielding struggle with the remnants of the old ideology and with laziness, lack of culture, bureaucracy and carelessness... Producers and writers who suppose that the Soviet people want only entertainment and amusement... are hopelessly wrong. Soviet literature and art must produce works full of passion and deep thought, shot through with ideas of Soviet patriotism."

Kultura i zhizn was launched as a biweekly publication, but later it was published three times per month. Its headquarters was in Moscow. The founding editor-in-chief of Kultura i zhizn was Andrei Zhdanov who was succeeded by his deputy editor P. A. Satyukov. Lev Kopelev was among its contributors. The magazine frequently reported the activities of the Academy of Social Sciences which was also established by the Central Committee in 1946. In 1949 it criticized theater critics arguing that they were just snobs with bourgeois opinions on literature and art. This attack was part of the negative attitudes of the Soviet authorities towards cosmopolites.

The last issue of Kultura i zhizn appeared on 28 February 1951.
