= Kaszewy-Spójnia =

Village in Gmina Krzyżanów, Poland

- Village
- Location within Poland
- Coordinates: 52°12′25″N 19°27′41″E
- Country: Poland
- Voivodeship: Łódź
- County: Kutno
- Gmina: Krzyżanów

Kaszewy-Spójnia [kaˈʂɛvɨ ˈspui̯ɲa] is a village in the administrative district of Gmina Krzyżanów, within Kutno County, Łódź Voivodeship, in central Poland.
