= Goliszew, Łódź Voivodeship =

Goliszew
- Village
- Location within Poland
- Coordinates: 52°8′49″N 19°26′19″E
- Country: Poland
- Voivodeship: Łódź
- County: Kutno
- Gmina: Krzyżanów

Goliszew [ɡɔˈliʂɛf] is a village in the administrative district of Gmina Krzyżanów, within Kutno County, Łódź Voivodeship, in central Poland.
