= Złotniki, Kutno County =

Złotniki
- Village
- Location within Poland
- Coordinates: 52°13′17″N 19°29′26″E
- Country: Poland
- Voivodeship: Łódź
- County: Kutno
- Gmina: Krzyżanów

Złotniki [zwɔtˈniki] is a village in the administrative district of Gmina Krzyżanów, within Kutno County, Łódź Voivodeship, in central Poland.
