= Wojciechowice Duże =

- Village
- Location within Poland
- Coordinates: 52°11′35″N 19°24′19″E
- Country: Poland
- Voivodeship: Łódź
- County: Kutno
- Gmina: Krzyżanów
- Population: 90

Wojciechowice Duże (Polish pronunciation: [vɔjt͡ɕɛxɔˈvit͡sɛ ˈduʐɛ]) is a village in the administrative district of Gmina Krzyżanów, within Kutno County, Łódź Voivodeship, in central Poland.
