= Kaszewy Kościelne =

- Village
- Location within Poland
- Coordinates: 52°12′58″N 19°27′52″E
- Country: Poland
- Voivodeship: Łódź
- County: Kutno
- Gmina: Krzyżanów
- Population (2021 consensus): 75

Kaszewy Kościelne [kaˈʂɛvɨ kɔɕˈt͡ɕɛlnɛ] is a village in the administrative district of Gmina Krzyżanów, within Kutno County, Łódź Voivodeship, in central Poland.

== Demographics ==
As of a 2021 consensus, the population of Kaszewy Kościelne was 75.

Population consensus (2011)	Population consensus (2021)	Increase
90	75	-16.7%
