= Konary, Kutno County =

Konary
- Village
- Location within Poland
- Coordinates: 52°10′37″N 19°26′21″E
- Country: Poland
- Voivodeship: Łódź
- County: Kutno
- Gmina: Krzyżanów

Konary [kɔˈnarɨ] is a village in the administrative district of Gmina Krzyżanów, within Kutno County, Łódź Voivodeship, in central Poland.
