= Krzyżanówek =

- Village
- Location within Poland
- Coordinates: 52°11′4″N 19°28′40″E
- Country: Poland
- Voivodeship: Łódź
- County: Kutno
- Gmina: Krzyżanów
- Population: 200

Krzyżanówek [kʂɨʐaˈnuvɛk] is a village in the administrative district of Gmina Krzyżanów, within Kutno County, Łódź Voivodeship, in central Poland.
