= Zieleniew, Gmina Krzyżanów =

Zieleniew
- Village
- Location within Poland
- Coordinates: 52°9′9″N 19°22′33″E
- Country: Poland
- Voivodeship: Łódź
- County: Kutno
- Gmina: Krzyżanów
- Population: 50

Zieleniew [ʑɛˈlɛɲɛf] is a village in the administrative district of Gmina Krzyżanów, within Kutno County, Łódź Voivodeship, in central Poland.
