= Uroczysko Leśne =

- Settlement
- Location within Poland
- Coordinates: 52°13′41″N 19°28′47″E
- Country: Poland
- Voivodeship: Łódź
- County: Kutno
- Gmina: Krzyżanów

Uroczysko Leśne [urɔˈt͡ʂɨskɔ ˈlɛɕnɛ] is a settlement in the administrative district of Gmina Krzyżanów, within Kutno County, Łódź Voivodeship, in central Poland.
