= Łęki Kościelne =

- Village
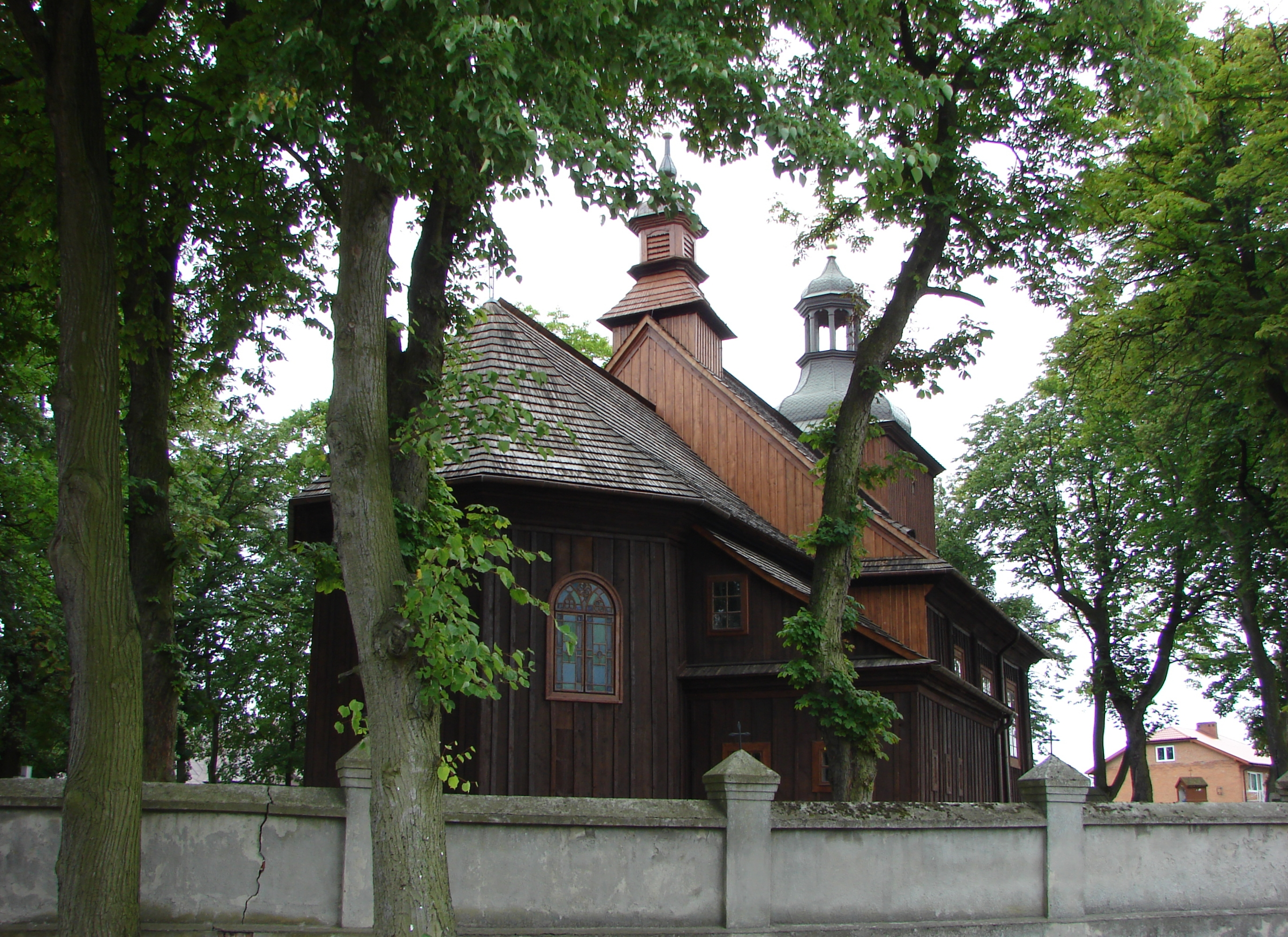
- Parish church of St. Mary Magdalene from 1775.

- Location within Poland
- Coordinates: 52°10′N 19°30′E
- Country: Poland
- Voivodeship: Łódź
- County: Kutno
- Gmina: Krzyżanów

Łęki Kościelne (Polish pronunciation: [ˈwɛŋkʲi kɔɕˈtɕɛlnɛ]) is a village in the administrative district of Gmina Krzyżanów, within Kutno County, Łódź Voivodeship, in central Poland.
