= Marcinów, Kutno County =

Marcinów
- Village
- Location within Poland
- Coordinates: 52°9′25″N 19°24′36″E
- Country: Poland
- Voivodeship: Łódź
- County: Kutno
- Gmina: Krzyżanów
- Population: 80

Marcinów [marˈt͡ɕinuf] is a village in the administrative district of Gmina Krzyżanów, within Kutno County, Łódź Voivodeship, in central Poland.

In 2005 the village had a population of 80.
