= Julianów, Kutno County =

Julianów
- Village
- Location within Poland
- Coordinates: 52°12′16″N 19°29′51″E
- Country: Poland
- Voivodeship: Łódź
- County: Kutno
- Gmina: Krzyżanów

Julianów [juˈljanuf] is a village in the administrative district of Gmina Krzyżanów, within Kutno County, Łódź Voivodeship, in central Poland.
