= Leonid Zakovsky =

Latvian Bolshevik revolutionary and Soviet politician and intelligence officer

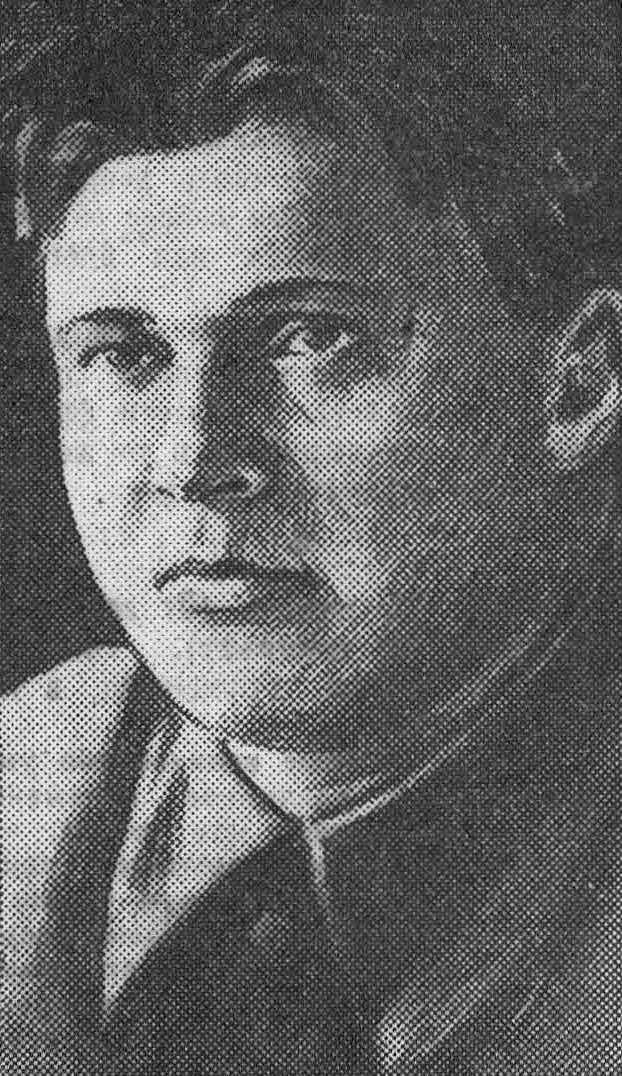

People's Commissars of Internal Affairs of the Byelorussian SSR
- In office 15 July 1934 – 10 December 1934
- Preceded by: Position established (himself as the Chairman of the OGPU of the Byelorussian SSR)
- Succeeded by: Izrail Leplevsky

Personal details
- Born: Henriks Štubis; 1894 Brest-Litovsk, Grodno Governorate, Russian Empire
- Died: August 29, 1938 (aged 43–44) Kommunarka shooting ground, Moscow, Russian SFSR, Soviet Union
- Party: RSDLP (b) (1913–1918); All-Union Communist Party (b) (1918–1938)

Leonid Mikhailovich Zakovsky (Latvian: Leonīds Zakovskis; Russian: Леони́д Миха́йлович Зако́вский; originally named Henriks Štubis; 1894 – August 29, 1938) was a Latvian Bolshevik revolutionary, Soviet politician and NKVD Commissar 1st Class of State Security (equivalent to the Soviet Red Army rank of Komandarm 1st rank).

== Early career ==
He was born Henriks Štubis in Kreis Hasenpoth in the Courland Governorate of the Russian Empire (present-day Latvia) in a family of Latvian ethnicity. He was arrested twice during 1913, and on the second occasion was convicted of belonging to an anarchist group, and deported to Olonets province in north Russia. He later concealed his anarchist past, claiming to have been a Bolshevik since 1913. After the February Revolution, he moved to Petrograd (St Petersburg), and was responsible for security at the Smolny Institute, the building which the Bolsheviks commandeered for their headquarters. During the Bolshevik Revolution, he led a detachment of sailors who seized control of Petrograd's telephone exchange. In December 1917, a few weeks after the Bolsheviks had seized power, renaming their organisation the All-Russian Communist Party, Zakovsky became one of the founding members of the Cheka. He served in this organisation, under its different names, for the remainder of his career. During the Russian Civil War, he took part in suppressing anti-communist rebellions in Astrakhan, Saratov, Kazan and elsewhere.

In February 1926, he was appointed head of the OGPU in Siberia. He was in charge of security during Josif Stalin's visit to Siberia early in 1928, during which the General Secretary ordered grain to be seized by force from producers who were unwilling to sell, a decision which was the precursor to the forced collectivisation of agriculture. In 1928, Zakovsky was given the additional role of head of the 'troika' system, created to administer extrajudicial reprisals against peasants who resisted the change in policy. From November 21, 1929, to January 21, 1930, alone, the troika handled 156 cases, in which 898 people were convicted and, of those, 347 were shot. At the height of collectivisation, in 1930, the troika handed out sentences on 16,553 people, of whom 4,762 (28.8%) were shot—their death signed by Zakovsky—and 8,576 (51.8%) were sent to the labour camps.

In 1932, Zakovsky was appointed head of the OGPU in the Belorussian Soviet Republic.

== Role in the 1930s purges ==
In December 1934, the Leningrad (St Petersburg) communist party leader Sergei Kirov was assassinated. The police officers deemed responsible for this security lapse were sacked, and Zakovsky was transferred in January 1935 as head of the Leningrad NKVD, replacing Filipp Medved.

In this capacity, alongside Kirov's successor, Andrei Zhdanov, he organized the secret trial of the so-called 'Leningrad counter-revolutionary group of Safarov, Zalutsky and others', at which 20 former party members suspected of loyalty to the former Leningrad party boss, Grigory Zinoviev, and the round-up and mass deportation of the so-called 'Leningrad aristocrats'—11,702 people who had lived in comparative prosperity before the revolution. The writer Nadezhda Mandelstam later described going with Anna Akhmatova to the station to say goodbye to a woman who was being deported with her three small sons.

It was impossible to move in the milling throng, but this time people were sitting not on bundles, but on quite respectable-looking trunks and suitcases still covered with old foreign travel labels. As we pushed our way through to the platform, we were constantly greeted by old women we knew: former 'ladies' and just ordinary women. "I never knew I had so many friends among the aristocracy," said Akhmatova.

After this operation, Zakovsky was promoted to the level of Commissar of State Security, First Rank, and awarded the Order of the Red Star (1936). During a plenum of the Central Committee on 3 March 1937, he delivered a long personal attack on his former boss Genrikh Yagoda, whom he accused of impeding the investigations in Leningrad and generally refusing to take action against former oppositionists in the communist party. At the plenary session of the Leningrad communist party on March 20, 1937, he declared that there were "enemies still active" within the organisation, an announcement that marked the onset of a purge of the Leningrad party that was "violent even by Soviet standards."

Zakovsky was planning a major trial of leading Leningrad communists, including Zhdanov's deputy, Mikhail Chudov (who was executed in 1937), his wife Lyudmila Shaposhnikova, Boris Pozern (shot in 1938), and others. An Old Bolshevik named Rozenblum, who survived the purges, was lined up as a witness, brutally tortured, and then brought before Zakovsky. This case was included in the famous Secret Speech which the Soviet leader Nikita Khrushchev delivered to the 20th Communist Party congress, in 1956, denouncing crimes committed under Josif Stalin. Khrushchev said:

With unbelievable cynicism, Zakovsky told about the vile 'mechanism' for the crafty creation of fabricated 'anti-Soviet plots.' “In order to illustrate it to me,” stated Rozenblum, “Zakovsky gave me several possible variants of the organization of this center and of its branches. After he detailed the organization to me, Zakovsky told me that the NKVD would prepare the case of this center, remarking that the trial would be public....'You, yourself,' said Zakovsky, ‘will not need to invent anything. The NKVD will prepare for you a ready outline for every branch of the center. You will have to study it carefully, and remember well all questions the Court might ask and their answers...If you manage to endure it, you will save your head and we will feed and clothe you at the Government’s cost until your death.'”

The public trial never took place: the victims were shot after closed trials. In 1937 Zakovsky was awarded the Order of Lenin. Around this time he is said to have boasted that if he had had Karl Marx to interrogate he would make him confess to being an agent of Bismarck.

On January 29, 1938, it was announced that Zakovsky had been transferred to Moscow as First Deputy head of the NKVD, second in command to the infamous Nikolai Yezhov. Among his first tasks was to dispose of the head of the NKVD foreign department, Abram Slutsky. Rather than have him arrested, which might have provoked foreign agents to defect, Zakovsky crept up on him while he was talking to fellow officer Mikhail Frinovsky and stupefied him with chloroform, allowing another officer to inject him with poison. Zakovsky also took part in interrogating the former head of the NKVD, Genrikh Yagoda, to get him to confess under torture to being a terrorist.

In spring 1938, Zakovsky became a victim of the Great Purge, as Order 49990, calling for the mass arrests of ethnic Latvians, was applied to serving NKVD officers. He was sacked on April 16, 1938, and on April 19 he was arrested and accused of being part of the 'Yagoda conspiracy,' of being a spy, and of organising a Latvian nationalist clique within the NKVD. He and his former deputy, Nikonovich, were both severely tortured. In summer 1938, as Lavrenti Beria was about to take over control of the NKVD, Zakovsky's successor, Mikhail Frinovsky, decided rapidly to get rid of former officers who might incriminate him, including Zakovsky, who was shot on August 29, 1938.

== Family ==
Wife: Serafima Mikhailovna Zakovskaya, born in 1900, a housewife, resident of Moscow, 5 Bolshoy Kiselny Lane. She was arrested on April 29, 1938. She was included in the “Moscow Center” list of August 20, 1938, under Category 1 (“wives of enemies of the people”); the list was approved by Stalin and Molotov. On August 26, 1938, she was sentenced to death by the Military Collegium of the Supreme Court of the USSR on charges of “espionage” and shot the same day, together with a number of wives of prominent party officials, Chekists, and military officers. Her burial place is the NKVD special site Kommunarka. She was posthumously rehabilitated on June 20, 1990, by the Plenum of the Supreme Court of the USSR.

Brother: Fritz Ernstovich Shtubis, born in 1890, a candidate member of the All-Union Communist Party (Bolsheviks) and head of a department of the Odessa Regional Union of Consumer Cooperatives. He lived in Odessa at 12 V. Lenin Street, apartment 14. He was arrested on May 10, 1938. He was included in the “Moscow Center” list of August 20, 1938, under Category 1 (“List No. 1”); the list was approved by Stalin and Molotov. On August 28, 1938, he was sentenced to death by the Military Collegium of the Supreme Court of the USSR on charges of “participation in a White Guard detachment fighting partisans in Siberia and suppressing the revolutionary movement.” He was shot the same day. His burial place is the NKVD special site Kommunarka. He was posthumously rehabilitated on September 23, 1987, by the Plenum of the Supreme Court of the USSR.

Sister: Elsa Ernstovna Zakovskaya, born in 1888, an employee of the NKVD of the USSR and a second-rank military technician. She lived in Moscow at 3a Bolshoy Komsomolsky Lane, apartment 36. She was arrested on May 13, 1938. She was included in the same “Moscow Center” List No. 3, under Category 1 (“former NKVD employees”), as Leonid Zakovsky. On September 3, 1938, she was sentenced to death by the Military Collegium of the Supreme Court of the USSR on charges of “participation in a counterrevolutionary terrorist organization within the NKVD.” She was shot the same day. Her burial place is the NKVD special site Kommunarka. She was posthumously rehabilitated on July 26, 1990, by the Plenum of the Supreme Court of the USSR.

== Publications ==
- Заковский Л. Ликвидация «пятой колонны» [Текст] / Л. Заковский, С. Уранов. — М. : Алгоритм : Эксмо, 2009. — 272 с. — (Загадка 1937 года). — ISBN 978-5-699-37482-3
- Заковский Л. О некоторых методах и приемах иностранных разведывательных органов и их троцкистско-бухаринской агентуры. / О некоторых методах и приемах иностранных разведывательных органов и их троцкистско-бухаринской агентуры. Сборник. // Партиздат ЦК ВКПБ, 1937
- Заковский Л. Шпионов, диверсантов и вредителей уничтожим до конца! / О некоторых методах и приемах иностранных разведывательных органов и их троцкистско-бухаринской агентуры. Сборник. // Партиздат ЦК ВКПБ, 1937

== Bibliography ==
- Гвардейцы Октября. Роль коренных народов стран Балтии в установлении и укреплении большевистского строя. — М.: Индрик, 2009. — ISBN 978-5-91674-014-1
- Мильбах В. С. (2007). Особая Краснознамённая Дальневосточная армия (Краснознамённый Дальневосточный фронт). Политические репрессии командно-начальствующего состава, 1937—1938 гг (1000 экз ed.). СПб.: Изд-во СПбГУ. ISBN 978-5-288-04193-8.
- Заковский Л. М. // Петров Н. В., Скоркин К. В. (1999). Кто руководил НКВД, 1934—1941 : справочник. Под ред. Н. Г. Охотина и А. Б. Рогинского (3000 экз ed.). М.: Звенья. p. 502. ISBN 5-7870-0032-3.
- Тепляков А. Г. Машина террора: ОГПУ–НКВД Сибири в 1929—1941 гг. / А. Г. Тепляков. — М.: Новый Хронограф; АИРО-XXI, 2008.
- Тепляков А. Г. «Как не подходящий по личным подвигам в боевой обстановке»: наградные документы Сибирских чекистов 1930—1931 годов // Вестник Новосибирского государственного университета. Том 11. Выпуск 1. История. 2012. Новосибирск. С. 159—167.
