= Sokół, Łódź Voivodeship =

Sokół
- Village
- Location within Poland
- Coordinates: 52°13′15″N 19°27′29″E
- Country: Poland
- Voivodeship: Łódź
- County: Kutno
- Gmina: Krzyżanów

Sokół [ˈsɔkuu̯] is a village in the administrative district of Gmina Krzyżanów, within Kutno County, Łódź Voivodeship, in central Poland.
