= Świniary, Łódź Voivodeship =

Świniary
- Village
- Location within Poland
- Coordinates: 52°10′29″N 19°24′48″E
- Country: Poland
- Voivodeship: Łódź
- County: Kutno
- Gmina: Krzyżanów

Świniary [ɕfiˈɲarɨ] is a village in the administrative district of Gmina Krzyżanów, within Kutno County, Łódź Voivodeship, in central Poland.
