= Wally (given name) =

Wally or Wallie is a given name, and a nickname for Wallace which ultimately means 'Wales' and Walter. It may refer to:

== People ==
- Alagie Wally (born 2006), Gambian footballer
- Wally Amos (1936–2024), American personality, entrepreneur, and author
- Wally Badarou (born 1955), French musician
- Wally Bayola (born 1972), Filipino actor and comedian
- Wallie Branston (1923–2013), Canadian pioneering race car driver in the 1940s and '50s
- Wallace Smith Broecker (1931–2019), American geochemist
- Wally Bruner (1931–1997), American journalist and game show host
- Wally Butts (1905–1973), American football coach
- Wally Chambers (1951–2019), American football player
- Wallie Coetsee (born 1972), South African golfer
- Wally Cox (1924–1973), American comedian and actor
- W. A. Criswell (1909–2002), American pastor, author, and former president of the Southern Baptist Convention
- Wally Dallenbach Jr. (born 1963), American race car driver
- Wally Dallenbach Sr. (born 1936), American race car driver
- Wouter "Wally" De Backer (born 1980), Australian musician known professionally as Gotye
- Wally Dempsey (1944–2024), American football player
- Wally Downes (born 1961), English association footballer and coach
- Wally Fawkes (1924–2023), British-Canadian jazz clarinetist and satirical cartoonist
- Chris "Wally" Feresten (born 1965 or 1966), American cue card handler
- Wally Funk (1939–2026), American aviator, oldest person to travel into space
- Wally Gabler (1944–2025), American football player
- Wally Garard (1916–2004), American football player
- Wally George (1931–2003), American commentator born George Walter Pearch
- Wally Gould (1938–2018), English footballer
- Wally Green (1918–2007), English motorcycle speedway rider
- Wally Hayward (1908–2006), South African ultra distance runner
- Wallie Herzer (1885–1961), American composer of popular music, music publisher, and pianist
- Wally Hirsh (1936–2024), German-born New Zealand educator
- Wallie Abraham Hurwitz (1886–1958), American mathematician
- Wally Kurth (born 1958), American soap opera actor
- Wallie or Willie Lane (1883–1920), British jockey
- Wally Lewis (born 1959) Australian rugby league footballer
- Wally McRae (1936–2025), American cowboy poet
- Wally Moon (1930–2018) American baseball player
- Wally Nanayakkara (1939–2003), Sri Lankan Sinhala cinema, TV, and theater actor
- Wally Nightingale (1956–1996), British guitarist and founder of the Sex Pistols
- Wally Parks (1913–2007), one of the founders of the National Hot Rod Association
- Wally Phillips (1925–2008), American radio personality
- Wally Price (1926–2021), Australian rules footballer
- Wally Prigg (1908–1980), Australian rugby league footballer
- Wally Priestley, American politician
- Wally Schirra (1923–2007), American astronaut
- Wally Schlotter, Chairman of the San Diego Film Commission from 1978–1996
- Wally Szczerbiak (born 1977), retired National Basketball Association player
- Wally Warning (died 2025), Aruban reggae musician and singer
- Wally Whyton (1929–1997), British musician, songwriter and radio and TV personality
- Wally Wilson (born 1947), American record producer
- Wally Wilson (ice hockey) (1921–1995), Canadian ice hockey player
- Wally Wingert (born 1961), American voice actor
- Wally Wolf (1930–1997), American swimmer, water polo player, and Olympic champion
- Wally Wolf (baseball) (1942–2020), American baseball player
- Wally Zatylny (born 1964), Canadian football player

== Fictional characters ==
- Wally Walrus, character from Woody Woodpecker
- Wally Gator, an anthropomorphic alligator from The Hanna-Barbera New Cartoon Series
- Wally the Green Monster, the official mascot of the Boston Red Sox baseball team
- Wally (Dilbert), a lazy engineer from the Dilbert comic strip
- Wally (Pokémon), a character from the Pokémon video game series
- Wally (Wallabies mascot)
- Wally Cleaver, the older brother played by Tony Dow on the television series Leave It to Beaver
- Wally West, third character to become the Flash in the DC Comics Universe
- Character in the Where's Wally? series of books (known as Waldo in the United States)
- The mascot of "Wally World" in National Lampoon's Vacation
- Wallace "Wally" Fitzgerald McGillicutty, the polar bear from the webcomic Wally and Osborne, formerly known as On the Rocks
- Wallabee "Wally" Beatles (Numbuh 4), a fictional character from Codename: Kids Next Door
- Wally the Walrus, a recurring character from the Canadian television series Paw Patrol
- Wally Warbles, a bird boss in the video game Cuphead
- Wally the Great, a magician in The Wiggles Movie
- WALL-E, a fictional robot tasked to clean up the Earth in the 2008 animated film, "WALL-E"
- Wally B., a character in the 1984 short film The Adventures of André & Wally B.
- Wally B. Feed, cartographer from the Monkey Island game series
- Wally the Wizard, a Magician child from Marvel Comics.
- Wally/Wolliriki, a character in Kikoriki, also known as GoGoRiki (United States).
- Wally, a fictional character from the animated series Rocket Monkeys
- Title character of opera La Wally (female; short for Walburga)
- Wally Trollman, a blue troll from Wallykazam!
- Wally Clark, School Spirits

== See also ==
- Wali (given name)
- Waly
