= Władysławów, Kutno County =

Władysławów
- Village
- Location within Poland
- Coordinates: 52°11′44″N 19°30′34″E
- Country: Poland
- Voivodeship: Łódź
- County: Kutno
- Gmina: Krzyżanów

Władysławów [vwadɨˈswavuf] is a village in the administrative district of Gmina Krzyżanów, within Kutno County, Łódź Voivodeship, in central Poland.
