= Młogoszyn =

- Village
- Location within Poland
- Coordinates: 52°8′30″N 19°28′4″E
- Country: Poland
- Voivodeship: Łódź
- County: Kutno
- Gmina: Krzyżanów

Młogoszyn [mwɔˈɡɔʂɨn] is a village in the administrative district of Gmina Krzyżanów, within Kutno County, Łódź Voivodeship, in central Poland.
