= Psurze =

- Village
- Location within Poland
- Coordinates: 52°12′N 19°26′E
- Country: Poland
- Voivodeship: Łódź
- County: Kutno
- Gmina: Krzyżanów

Psurze [ˈpsuʐɛ] is a village in the administrative district of Gmina Krzyżanów, within Kutno County, Łódź Voivodeship, in central Poland.
