= Stefanów, Kutno County =

Stefanów
- Village
- Location within Poland
- Coordinates: 52°8′58″N 19°27′56″E
- Country: Poland
- Voivodeship: Łódź
- County: Kutno
- Gmina: Krzyżanów

Stefanów [stɛˈfanuf] is a village in the administrative district of Gmina Krzyżanów, within Kutno County, Łódź Voivodeship, in central Poland.
