= Malewo, Łódź Voivodeship =

Malewo
- Village
- Location within Poland
- Coordinates: 52°9′57″N 19°24′39″E
- Country: Poland
- Voivodeship: Łódź
- County: Kutno
- Gmina: Krzyżanów

Malewo [maˈlɛvɔ] is a village in the administrative district of Gmina Krzyżanów, within Kutno County, Łódź Voivodeship, in central Poland.
