= Żakowo =

Żakowo may refer to the following places in Poland:

- Żakowo, Greater Poland Voivodeship
- Żakowo, Pomeranian Voivodeship
