= Żakowice, Kutno County =

Żakowice
- Village
- Location within Poland
- Coordinates: 52°11′26″N 19°25′33″E
- Country: Poland
- Voivodeship: Łódź
- County: Kutno
- Gmina: Krzyżanów
- Population: 70

Żakowice [ʐakɔˈvit͡sɛ] is a village in the administrative district of Gmina Krzyżanów, within Kutno County, Łódź Voivodeship, in central Poland.
