= Wały B =

- Village
- Location within Poland
- Coordinates: 52°10′58″N 19°24′46″E
- Country: Poland
- Voivodeship: Łódź
- County: Kutno
- Gmina: Krzyżanów
- Population: 140

Wały B is a village in the administrative district of Gmina Krzyżanów, within Kutno County, Łódź Voivodeship, in central Poland.
