= Nowe Ktery =

- Village
- Location within Poland
- Coordinates: 52°8′41″N 19°23′54″E
- Country: Poland
- Voivodeship: Łódź
- County: Kutno
- Gmina: Krzyżanów
- Population: 240

Nowe Ktery is a village located in the administrative district of Gmina Krzyżanów, within Kutno County, Łódź Voivodeship, in central Poland.
