= Rybie, Łódź Voivodeship =

Rybie
- Village
- Location within Poland
- Coordinates: 52°9′16″N 19°26′19″E
- Country: Poland
- Voivodeship: Łódź
- County: Kutno
- Gmina: Krzyżanów

Rybie [ˈrɨbjɛ] is a village in the administrative district of Gmina Krzyżanów, within Kutno County, Łódź Voivodeship, in central Poland.
