= Mariupol uezd =

Mariupol uezd Маріупольскій уѣздъ
- Uezd
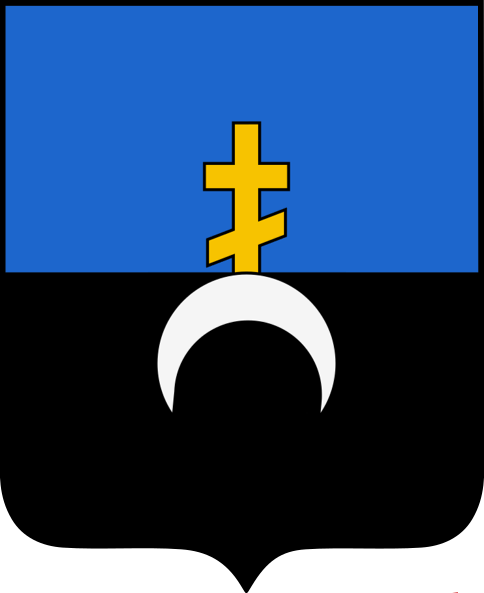
- Coat of arms

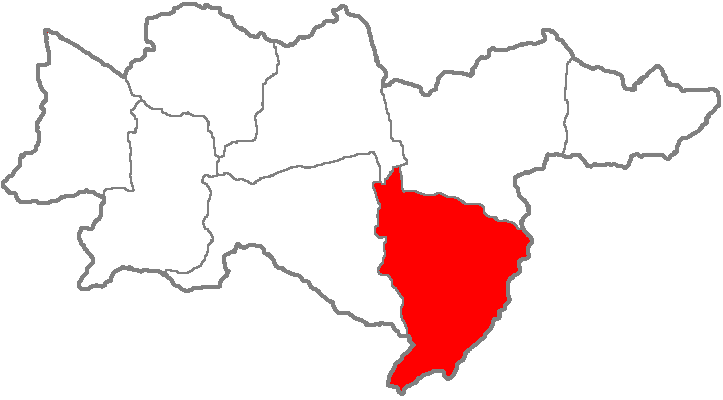
- Location in the Yekaterinoslav Governorate
- Country: Russian Empire
- Governorate: Yekaterinoslav
- Established: 1780
- Abolished: 1923
- Capital: Mariupol

Area
  - Total: 8,989.5 km^{2} (3,470.9 sq mi)

Population (1897)
  - Total: 254,056
  - Density: 28.261/km^{2} (73.197/sq mi)

The Mariupol uezd (Russian: Маріупольскій уѣздъ, romanized: Mariupolskiy uyezd; Ukrainian: Маріупольський повіт, romanized: Mariupol's'kyi povit) was one of the subdivisions of the Yekaterinoslav Governorate of the Russian Empire. It was situated in the southeastern part of the governorate. Its administrative centre was Mariupol.

== Demographics ==
At the time of the Russian Empire Census of 1897, Mariupolsky Uyezd had a population of 254,056. Of these, 46.1% spoke Ukrainian, 19.0% Greek, 14.0% Russian, 7.5% German, 6.1% Tatar, 4.1% Yiddish, 2.1% Turkish, 0.7% Belarusian and 0.2% Polish as their native language.
