= Brony, Łódź Voivodeship =

Brony
- Village
- Location within Poland
- Coordinates: 52°8′15″N 19°24′45″E
- Country: Poland
- Voivodeship: Łódź
- County: Kutno
- Gmina: Krzyżanów
- Population: 80
- Time zone: UTC+1 (CET)
  - Summer (DST): UTC+2 (CEST)
- ISO 3166 code: POL

Brony [ˈbrɔnɨ] is a village which is in the administrative district of Gmina Krzyżanów, within Kutno County, Łódź Voivodeship, in central Poland.

== Etymology ==
Brony's name is from the Polish word for "harrows".

== History ==
From 1975 to 1998, Brony belonged to the Płock Voivodeship.
