= Mieczysławów, Łódź Voivodeship =

Mieczysławów
- Village
- Location within Poland
- Coordinates: 52°10′41″N 19°24′49″E
- Country: Poland
- Voivodeship: Łódź
- County: Kutno
- Gmina: Krzyżanów

Mieczysławów [mjɛt͡ʂɨˈswavuf] is a village in the administrative district of Gmina Krzyżanów, within Kutno County, Łódź Voivodeship, in central Poland.

The town was the site of a large armored battle during World War II, involving the 2nd SS Panzer Division Das Reich and elements of Polish armored units.
