= Ktery =

- Village
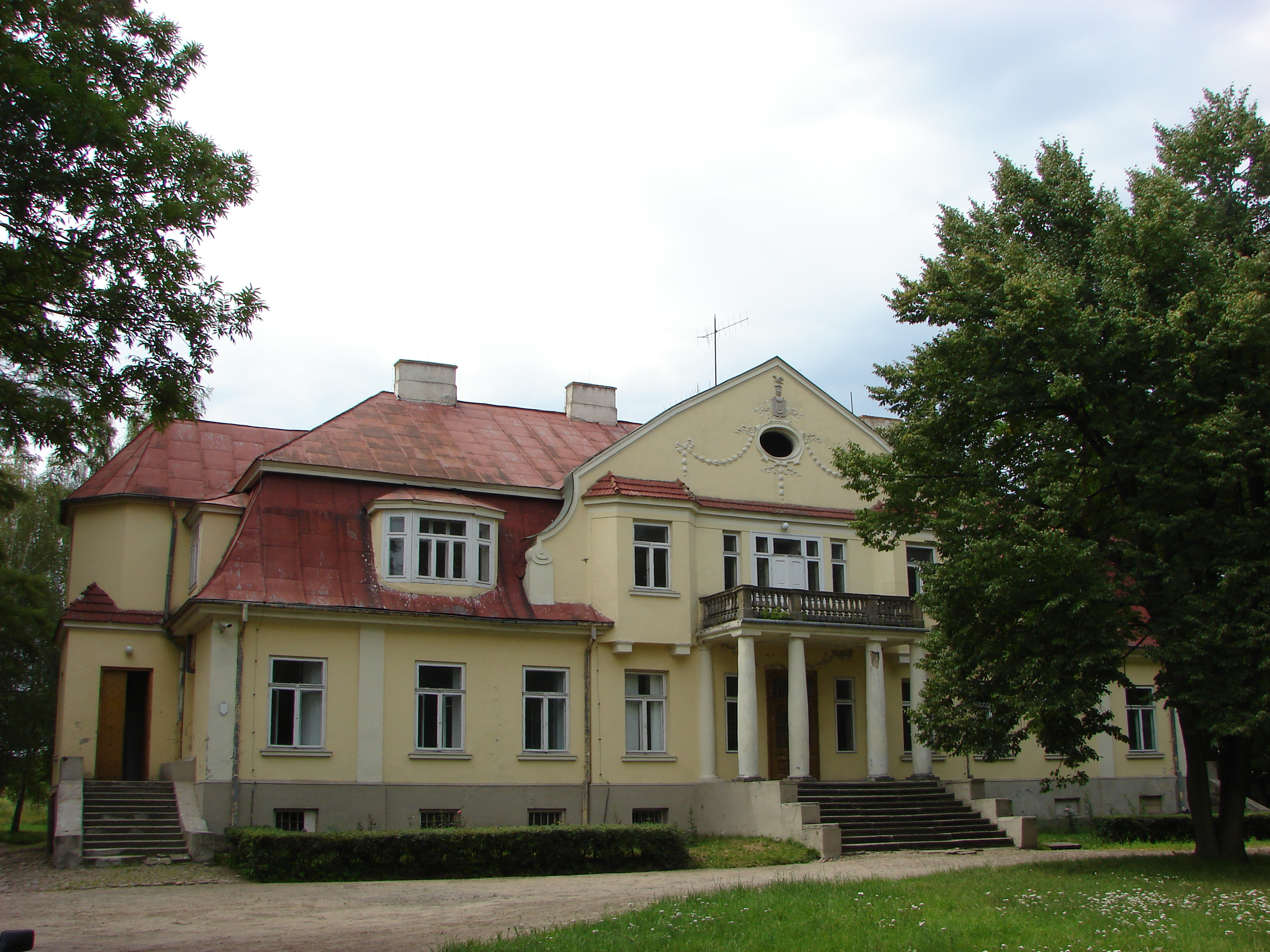
- The Manor house built in 1868

- Location within Poland
- Coordinates: 52°7′50″N 19°24′25″E
- Country: Poland
- Voivodeship: Łódź
- County: Kutno
- Gmina: Krzyżanów
- Population: 160

Ktery is a village in the administrative district of Gmina Krzyżanów, within Kutno County, Łódź Voivodeship, in central Poland.
