= Krzyżanów, Kutno County =

Krzyżanów
- Village
- Location within Poland
- Coordinates: 52°11′9″N 19°26′51″E
- Country: Poland
- Voivodeship: Łódź
- County: Kutno
- Gmina: Krzyżanów

Krzyżanów ([kʂɨˈʐanuf]) is a village in Kutno County, Łódź Voivodeship, in central Poland. It is the seat of the gmina (administrative district) called Gmina Krzyżanów.
