= Ivan Kodatsky =

Soviet politician (1893–1937)

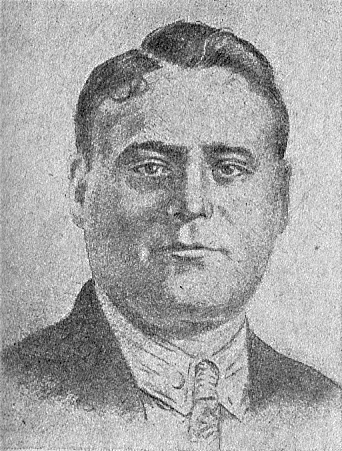
Kodatsky, from a 1936 book

Ivan Fedorovich Kodatsky (Russian: Иван Фёдорович Кодацкий; 1 July 1893 – 30 October 1937) was a Soviet politician.

== Early years ==
Born into a working-class family in Nikolaev, Kodatsky graduated from a trade school, then worked as a turner at the Nikolaev shipbuilding company, where he participated in strikes and illegal workers' circles.

He traveled to Petrograd in 1914, where he worked at the Nobel & Lessner shipyard and joined the Bolshevik faction of the Russian Social Democratic Labour Party ("RSDLP(b)") and became an activist of the Vyborg Committee of the RSDLP(b).

Kodatsky was arrested in January 1917 and then released on 6 (19) March 1917 under an amnesty after the February Revolution. He was a member of the Vyborg District Committee and the Petrograd City Committee of the RSDLP(b) and was elected as a member of the Petrograd Council and Chairman of the Vyborg District Duma. He actively participated in the planning and execution of the October Revolution, in which he took the Petrograd city telephone exchange.

== Career as a Communist official ==
After the establishment of Soviet power he was appointed secretary of the People's Commissariat of Labor.

In April 1920, he became the head of communications of the Azov Sea. In September 1920, he was given responsibility for the organization of fisheries and the export of fish and other products on the shores of the Black and Azov Seas by the Council of Labor and Defense of the RSFSR. In 1921, he headed the fisheries department in Dagestan.

He was then sent to Petrograd, where he was secretary of the Vyborg Committee of the All-Union Communist Party(b) when it took action against the United Opposition.

In 1928, he was made deputy chairman, and, from April 1929, Chairman of the Leningrad Regional Council of the National Economy.

On 10 January 1930, Kodatsky was elected chairman of the executive committee of the Leningrad Regional Council, and from 13 December 1931 to 14 February 1937, he was Chairman of the Leningrad City Council.

From 1925 to 1930, he was a candidate member and from 1930 to 1937, he was a member of the Central Committee of the VKP(b). He was also a member of the Presidium of the All-Russian Central Executive Committee and a member of the Central Executive Committee of the Soviet Union.

In January 1937, he was appointed head of the Main Directorate of Mechanical Engineering for Light Industry of the People's Commissariat of Heavy Industry of the USSR.

== Purge, execution and rehabilitation ==
In June 1937, he was arrested by the NKVD and was removed from the Central Committee. On 29 October 1937, the Military Collegium of the Supreme Court of the USSR sentenced him to capital punishment on charges of "participation in a counter-revolutionary terrorist organization". Kodatsky was shot on 30 October 1937, then buried at the Donskoy cemetery.

He was posthumously rehabilitated on 14 March 1956.
