= Mikhail Chudov =

Soviet politician and Russian revolutionary

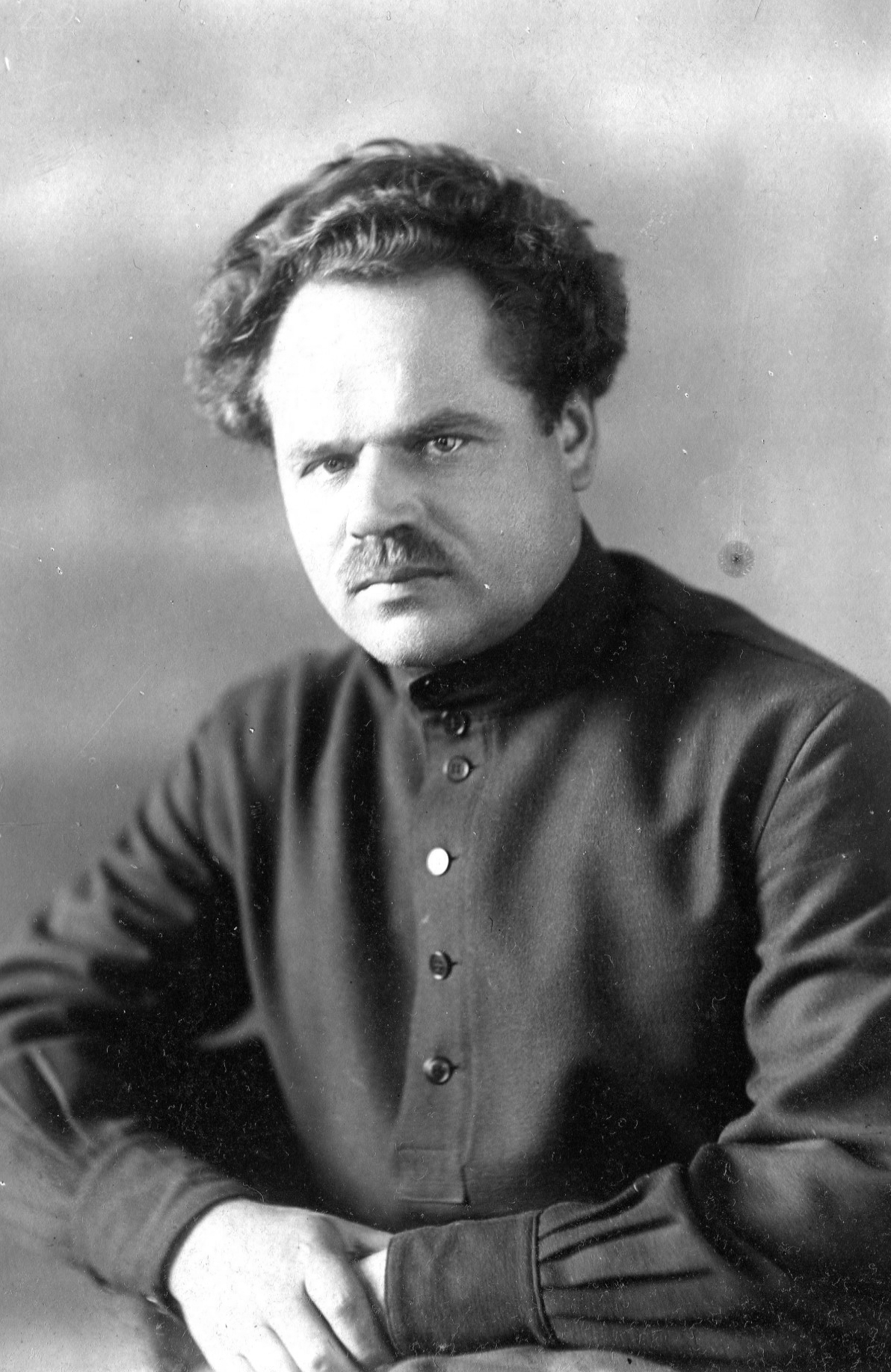
Chudov c. 1930s

Mikhail Semyonovich Chudov (Russian: Михаил Семёнович Чудов; 17 September 1893 – 30 October 1937) was a Russian revolutionary and Soviet politician. He and his wife were shot during the Great Purge.

== Early years ==
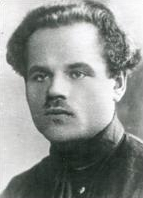
Chudov in his youth

Mikhail Semenovich Chudov was born on 17 September 1893 in the village of Khoneevo, Bezhetsky District, Tver Governorate. He worked as a printer in Saint Petersburg. He joined the Bolshevik faction of the Russian Social Democratic Labour Party ("RSDLP(b)") in 1913.

== Career as a Communist official ==
Chudov participated in the February and October revolutions of 1917. In 1918–1920 he was the chairman of the Bezhetsk party committee and the district executive committee. He later became Chairman of the Tver Provincial Executive Committee, Secretary of the Provincial Committee of the RCP(b), Secretary of the District Committee in Rostov-on-Don, and a member of the North Caucasian Regional Committee of the All-Union Communist Party (Bolsheviks) ("CPSU(b)").

In 1928–1936 he was the 2nd Secretary of the Leningrad Regional Party Committee, a deputy to Sergei Kirov, the 1st Secretary. He was a delegate to the 11th–17th Congresses of the CPSU(b), a candidate member of the Central Committee of the RCP(b) (1923–1925), a member of the Central Committee of the CPSU(b) (1925–1937), and a member of the All-Russian Central Executive Committee, the Central Executive Committee of the USSR.

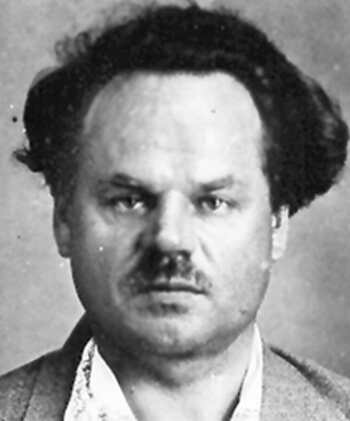
Chudov's police mugshot, 1937

He was removed from office, arrested and executed during the Great Purge. His wife, L. K. Shaposhnikova, was also repressed and shot.

On 17 March 1956, during the Khrushchev thaw, Mikhail Chudov was posthumously rehabilitated.
