= Ulanovskaya =

Ulanovskaya is a surname. Notable people with the surname include:

- Maya Ulanovskaya (1932–2020), Russiwn-American dissident
- Nadezhda Ulanovskaya (1903–1986), Soviet intelligence GRU officer
