= Jung-hwa =

- Hangul: 정화
- RR: Jeonghwa
- MR: Chŏnghwa

Jung-hwa, Jeong-hwa or Jong-hwa is a Korean given name.

People with this name include:

== Entertainers ==
- Uhm Jung-hwa (born 1969), South Korean actress and singer
- Kim Jung-hwa (born 1983), South Korean actress and model
- J.Fla (born Kim Jung-hwa, 1987), South Korean female singer and YouTuber
- Park Jeong-hwa (born 1995), South Korean singer and actress, member of girl group EXID

== Sportspeople ==
- Lee Jeong-hwa (born 1957), South Korean female sport shooter
- Hyun Jung-hwa (born 1969), South Korean female table tennis player
- An Jung-hwa (born 1981), South Korean female handball player
- Han Jung-hwa (born 1982), South Korean male football midfielder
- Im Jyoung-hwa (born 1987), South Korean female weightlifter
- Ri Jong-hwa (born 1990), North Korean female weightlifter
- Seo Jung-hwa (born 1990), South Korean female freestyle skier

== Other ==
- Choi Jeong Hwa (born 1961), South Korean male sculptor
- Won Jeong-hwa (born 1974), North Korean female spy

== See also ==
- List of Korean given names
