= Gorn (surname) =

Gorn is a surname. Notable people with the surname include:

- Lev Gorn (born 1971), Russian–American actor
- Saul Gorn (1912–1992), American computer scientist
- Steve Gorn (born 1987), American flautist and saxophonist
- Walter Gorn (1898–1968), German general in World War II
