= Alexander Ulanovsky =

Soviet GRU spy (1891–1970)

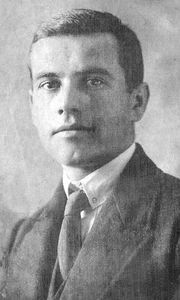
- Alexander Ulanovsky
- Born: Izrail Khaykelevich Ulanovsky; 1891; Chişinău, Bessarabia
- Died: 1970 (aged 78–79); USSR
- Occupation: Intelligence officer
- Spouse: Nadezhda Ulanovskaya
- Children: Maya Ulanovskaya
- Espionage activity
- Allegiance: Soviet Union
- Service branch: GRU
- Service years: 1923-1948
- Codename: Ulrich; William Joseph Berman; Bill Berman; Felik; Long Man; Nathan Sherman

Alexander Ulanovsky (1891–1970) was a Soviet resident spy.

== Biography ==
=== Early spy career ===
In 1921, Ulanovsky was dispatched to Berlin as a spy for the Cheka. As he had only received vague orders, he requested the Soviet embassy provide him with clearer instructions. When the embassy sent a telegraph to Moscow, the Cheka responded that they did not know of Ulanovsky and instructed the embassy to consider him an agent provocateur. In 1927, Ulanovsky was sent to China as a union representative and met with many Chinese Communist Party (CCP) officials under his own name. In October 1929, Ulanovsky and Richard Sorge were sent to Berlin, where they made contact with Konstantin Basov. Ulanovsky was given a fake Czech passport and the pseudonym "Kirschner", under which he was to pose as a metal salesman on his way to China and offer his services as a representative to western business interests. His offer was taken up by the Schelder Consortium, a Dutch company seeking to circumvent the Treaty of Versailles so they could send German weapons to China. On the way to China, Ulanovsky got drunk with a group of British members of the Shanghai Municipal Police and told them of his scheme to sell German arms to the Chinese market, jeopardising his mission.

=== Activities in Shanghai ===
Upon arriving in Shanghai in January 1930, Ulanovsky and Sorge made contact with Soviet agent Alexander Gurvich. Ulanovsky had been instructed to form an entirely new network of agents, as Gurvich's had been compromised, causing conflict between him and Gurvich, who had not been informed of the change in advance. After a fortnight in Shanghai, Ulanovsky reported that Sorge had managed to ingratiate himself in the German quarter of the Shanghai International Settlement and that they had discovered a conflict between Chiang Kai-Shek and the German colonisers, who opposed his nationalisation policies. Ulanovsky and Sorge also joined a local Christian youth organisation, but they were not able to discover anything through this. One night, Ulanovsky was recognised by a German businessman, who had attended one of his 1927 speeches where he had acted under his own name as a union representative. This forced him to avoid the German community and jeopardised his cover identity, effectively rendering him unable to act.

In the spring of 1930, Ulanovsky recruited the agent Rafail Kurgan, who managed to bribe a secretary in the Nationalist government to hand over information on audits of Chinese generals and contracts with western companies. Following this success, Kurgan asked Ulanovsky for more money and then disappeared with it for almost a month. On 12 June 1930, he returned to Ulanovsky and again asked him for money; as Kurgan knew Ulanovsky and his wife's real names and addresses, Ulanovsky handed the money over. He initially attempted to explain the lost money as Kurgan's gambling losses, but on 16 July 1930, he admitted to the Soviet bureau that he was being blackmailed. The following month, Kurgan again demanded money from Ulanovsky; he and his wife paid for a train ticket to Harbin and Kurgan again disappeared. Ulanovsky was later told by the Soviet double agent Evgeny Kozhevnikov that Kurgan had stayed in Shanghai and that he had been arrested for forgery. When Kozhevnikov requested money from Ulanovsky to help get Kurgan out of jail, Ulanovsky threw him out of his house. Realising that they could not remain under cover in Shanghai, Ulanovsky recommended Sorge replace him as head of the Shanghai bureau and, together with his wife, fled to Hong Kong by boat.

=== Activities in the United States ===
In 1931, Ulanovsky arrived in New York City, where he replaced Moishe Stern as station chief of the local branch of the Main Intelligence Directorate (GRU). From this position, throughout the 1930s, Ulanovsky worked as the handler of the American communist defectors Whittaker Chambers, Leon Muenster, Robert Osman, Lydia Stahl, Robert Gordon Switz, Marjorie Tilley and Joshua Turner. Chambers worked for Ulanovsky until 1938, when he received news of the Great Purge and went into hiding. Chambers later wrote extensively about Ulanovsky in his autobiography. Following his return to the Soviet Union, Ulanovsky was incarcerated in a Gulag, where he read many history books, particularly taking interest in the Khazar Khaganate. He was released in 1954, following the death of Joseph Stalin.

== See also ==
- Alexander Yakobson
- Hede Massing
- Valentin Markin
- Ignace Reiss

== Bibliography ==
- Matthews, Owen (2020) [2019]. An Impeccable Spy: Richard Sorge, Stalin's Master Agent. Bloomsbury Publishing. ISBN 9781408857809.
- Murphy, William T. (2018). "Lydia Stahl: a secret life, 1885-?". Journal of Intelligence History. 18 (1): 38–62. doi:10.1080/16161262.2018.1537037.
- Murphy, William T. (2019). "The Honeymoon Spies: Robert Gordon Switz and Marjorie Tilley". American Intelligence Journal. 36 (1): 75–98. JSTOR 27066340.
- Nakhimovsky, Alice (2024). The Dream of Social Justice and Bad Moral Luck: Eight Jewish Lives under Stalin. Academic Studies Press. ISBN 9798887192727.
- Streets-Salter, Heather (2023). "A 'constant lurking danger'? The Comintern's Far Eastern Bureau, 1928-33". Twentieth Century Communism. 24 (24): 75–109. doi:10.3898/175864323837280481.
- Volodarsky, Boris (2015). Stalin's Agent: The Life and Death of Alexander Orlov. Oxford University Press. ISBN 9780191045523.
- Znamenski, Andrei (2017). "Joseph Grigulevich: A Tale of Identity, Soviet Espionage, and Storytelling". The Soviet and Post-Soviet Review. 44 (3): 314–341. doi:10.1163/18763324-20171267.
