= Recruitment of spies =

Clandestine HUMINT asset recruiting, also known as agent cultivation, refers to the recruitment of human agents, commonly known as spies, who work for a foreign government, or within a host country's government or other target of intelligence interest for the gathering of human intelligence. The work of detecting and "doubling" spies who betray their oaths to work on behalf of a foreign intelligence agency is an important part of counterintelligence.

The term spy refers to human agents that are recruited by case officers of a foreign intelligence agency.

== Types of agents ==
Acquiring information may not involve collecting secret documents, but something as simple as observing the number and types of ships in a port. Even though such information might be readily visible, the laws of many countries would consider reporting it to a foreign power as espionage. Other asset roles include support functions such as communications, forgery, disguise, etc.

According to Victor Suvorov, a former Soviet military intelligence officer, a Soviet officer may be under diplomatic or nonofficial cover, handling two kinds of agent: basic and supplementary.

Basic agents can be formed into groups with leaders, or report directly to the controller. Basic agents include information providers, perhaps through espionage or expertise about some local subject. Also in the basic group are "executive agents", who will kill or commit sabotage, and recruiting agents. In US practice, recruiting agents are called access agents.

Both operation leaders and the supplementary group must be clandestine in support roles to basic agents. They may be clandestine officers of the FIS, such as Rudolf Abel, recruited in the target country, or recruited in a third country. One of the supplementary functions is communications, which includes clandestine radio transmission, dead drops, couriers, and finding places for secure radio transmissions. Other supplementary functions include people who can "legalise" agents with cover jobs, and specialists that can forge documents or get illicit copies from the actual source. Safe houses, safe mail drops, and safe telephones are other supplementary functions.

== Spotting ==
Recruiting process typically begins with "spotting". Spotting is the identification of targets—people—who appear to have access to information, or are attractive for some support role. This individual may be "developed" over a period of time before the approach is made or it could be made "cold". Alternatively, the potential agent may approach the agency; many intelligence assets were not recruited but were "walk-ins" or "write-ins" who offered information to foreign intelligence services. Background research is conducted on the potential agent to identify any ties to a foreign intelligence agency, select the most promising candidates and approach method.

Obvious candidates are staff officers under diplomatic cover, or officers under nonofficial contact, have routine contact. Also possible contacts of access agents, existing agents, or through information that suggests they may be compromised.

Surveillance of targets (e.g., military or other establishments, open source or compromised reference documents) sometimes reveals people with potential access to information, but no clear means of approaching them. With this group, a secondary survey is in order. Headquarters may be able to suggest an approach, perhaps through a third country or through resources not known to the field station.

Recruiting people that may have access to the activities of non-state groups will be much harder, since these groups tend to be much more clandestine, and often operate on a cell system composed of relatives and people who have known one another for years. Access agents may be especially important here, and it may be worth the effort to spot potential access agents.

The deliberate spotting process complements more obvious candidates, but candidates who are also more likely to be compromised by counterintelligence, such as walk-ins and write-ins.

According to Suvorov, the Soviet GRU was not always able to collect enough material, principally from open sources, to understand the candidate's motivations and vulnerabilities. It was GRU doctrine, therefore, to use every meeting to continue to elicit this information. Other intelligence authorities also see eliciting information as a continuing process.

That continued meetings both provide substantive intelligence, as well as knowledge about the asset, are not incompatible with security. Agent handlers still observe all the rules of clandestinity while developing the agent relationship. Knowledge of meetings, and indeed knowledge of the existence of the asset, must be on a strict need-to-know basis.

=== Persons with access to technology ===
After the selection of a candidate for recruitment, the first stage, tracing and cultivating, commences. Details are collected about the candidate, details which may be obtained through reference, books, telephone directories, the press, and other recruited agents. Further definition of motives which will be used in the actual recruitment of the person are cultivated and weaknesses are exacerbated.

=== Persons with access to knowledgeable people ===
Especially when the case officer is of a different culture than the one whose people they are targeting, the recruitment process begins not necessarily with a person that has the desired information. Instead, the first recruit may be someone well-connected in the local culture. Such a person may be called a principal agent or an access agent, who may simply arrange introductions, or actually run the operations of subagents. Some agents of this type may be able to help in the pre-recruitment stages of assessment and development, or may only be involved in finding possible assets.

Indeed, an access agent may arrange introductions without being completely witting that the purpose of meeting the target is to find people who will participate in espionage. A well-respected technical professional, or a professor, often will make introductions within their field. Such introductions are perfectly reasonable in non-espionage contexts, such as looking for jobs or people to fill them. The process of personnel recruiting for industry is not completely dissimilar from recruiting spies. Both may use personal networks, and, in industrialized countries, computer-assisted personal "networking" (for example, through websites such as LinkedIn).

=== Persons in allied intelligence agencies ===
A professional intelligence officer may very well obtain contacts through counterparts in the intelligence services of allied countries. The other service may arrange direct contact and then drop out of the process, or may jointly operate an asset such as the joint U.S.–UK operation with Oleg Penkovsky. The allied officer may not actually provide access to his assets, but will convey information requests and responses. There is the example of a CIA learned from the Malaysian service about an al-Qaeda meeting in Kuala Lumpur, something that would have been impossible for a lone CIA case officer to discover.

=== Targeting based on intelligence information ===
HUMINT collectors often have analysts in their own organizations with a sophisticated understanding of the people, with specialized knowledge in targeted countries, industries, or other groups. The analyst may or may not know details of the target's personality.

Even when no personal details are available, the recruiter, in an intelligence service, may have additional resources to use before the first contact. OSINT research can find the publications of a professional, but also social interests. With due regard to the risks and resources required, SIGINT can tap phone lines or intercept other communications that will give the recruiter more information about the target.

=== Prioritizing potential recruitment ===
This step differs from the next one, assessment of potential recruits, in that it is not focused on the recruit himself or herself, the probability of recruitment, etc., but, when there is more than one possible recruit, and a finite amount of case officer time, the discussion here gives criteria to select the most important person to target as an agent.

One analysis by a U.S. clandestine services officer with knowledge of European practices had five priorities (in descending order of importance) that he used between 1957 and 1962. He developed these in the context of being stationed in Europe during the Cold War, with a goal of acquiring HUMINT recruits in the Soviet Union and its satellite nations. His operations were focused on people with the general characteristics:

- They were involved in an embassy, legation, consulate, trade mission, and news bureau that constituted the "instrumentalities for that economic penetration, political subversion, and espionage that threatened U.S. interests". That focus could be considered one of counter-intelligence as well as espionage.
- They were outside "their iron curtains for extended periods of time, two to five years", so recruitment could involve a wide range of United States, and possibly allied, intelligence resources.

Among this group, the priorities were:

1. The most valuable recruit had regular access to "current political and economic intelligence from the installation in question". Ideally, the asset would be in the highest-priority country and have access to "the minutes of Politburo meetings" or equally critical military, scientific, or other data. In the case of countries that were either subordinate (e.g., the satellites of the former Soviet Union) or client states of another power, officials of the client country, or of the patron country's representatives in the client, may be easier to recruit than officials in the home country.
2. Nearly as important is an agent who will continue the relationship once he returns to his home country, be that the Soviet Union or a satellite. Recruitment is harder to detect with the less intense counterintelligence surveillance of an independent or satellite country. "Installation penetration thus becomes a means of establishing long-range assets in the satellites by recruiting, testing, and training them while they are abroad". In other words, the priority is to recruit a defector in place, continuing to report. "The Satellite diplomat, foreign trade official, journalist, or intelligence officer who has been useful to us abroad will be even more valuable when he goes back home at the end of his tour, not just because he is then inside the target country, but because the intelligence to which he has access in a ministry headquarters has greater scope and depth.
3. The third priority involves offensive counterintelligence/counterespionage: by observation of intelligence activities operated from embassies of country X, a counterintelligence service can deduce characteristic recruiting and agent handling practices for country X. Because these officers and techniques affect many hostile targets in the country of operations, once this information is known, the foreign intelligence service (FIS) agents can be neutralized in a variety of ways, including police action, convincing the asset in the country of operations to stop cooperating with the FIS, or, ideally, "recruiting the hostile intelligence officer in place".
4. The fourth and fifth priorities are considerably less urgent than the first three. The fourth priority is the "defection of senior diplomatic, trade, or intelligence personnel. Defection can obviously yield only those golden eggs already in the nest; it cuts off the continuing intelligence that could be provided by an in-place asset. It may be worthwhile, however, simply to deny a target country the services of an able and experienced officer, and it may produce, in addition to his store of positive intelligence, leads to his former colleagues who are still in place".
5. Last in priority is not direct recruitment, but the collection of information to support future recruitment. This begins with obtaining biographical information on "officials abroad who are likely in the future to have other tours of foreign duty somewhere in the world. An official may not be developable for recruitment during his current tour, but six months from now it might be a different story. Political turmoil being what it is within the Satellites, the "ins" can rapidly become the "outs". If we can identify a man as a former "in" who is now "out" we may be able to recruit him. But this kind of identification requires orderly and current biographic indexes of Satellite personnel who travel abroad".

=== Assessing potential recruits ===
In deciding whether to recruit a prospect, there needs to be a process to make sure that the person is not actively working for the adversary's counterintelligence, is under surveillance by them, or presents other risks that may not make recruitment wise. The assessment process applies both to walk-ins and targeted recruits, but additional assessment needs to apply to the walk-in, who is most likely to be someone sent by a counterintelligence service.

==== Assessing walk-ins ====
Major intelligence services are very cautious about walk-ins or write-ins, but some of the most important known assets were walk-ins, such as Oleg Penkovsky or write-ins (using intelligence tradecraft) such as Robert Hanssen. Most walk-ins though are rejected.

The U.S. Army defines three classes of people who may present themselves:

1. Defectors
2. Asylum seekers
3. Walk-ins: who seek to provide information to the United States; or a disaffected person (one who is discontent and resentful, especially against authority) who presents him- or herself to a U.S. installation in a foreign country and who appears willing to accept recruitment in place or requests asylum or assistance in escaping from the control of his or her government.

A Soviet response, to someone visiting the embassy, was "This is a diplomatic representation and not an espionage centre. Be so kind as to leave the building or we will call the police". According to Suvorov, the police are usually not called but the embassy staff chase the would-be agent out quickly.

Cautious handling of walk-ins was not exclusively a Soviet concern. U.S. Army procedure is to have military intelligence (MI) or military police (MP) personnel handle all aspects of walk-ins. Under U.S. Army Regulations, military police are not intended to do interrogations, which are the responsibility of military intelligence personnel.

While serious discussion with the contact will be done by counter-intelligence specialists, information about the walk-in must be restricted to people with a "need-to-know." "The information the walk-in provides must be guarded and classified appropriately".

While the interviewers will actually be from MI, the walk-in will never be told the identities of intelligence personnel. If they ask to see an intelligence representative, they will be told none is available. Both these measures are intended to prevent hostile intelligence services learning about the structure or procedure of US intelligence/counterintelligence personnel.

The Soviets showed caution equivalent to the United States. Soviet GRU doctrine was that on general, a walk-in is considered only when they can show some evidence of access to valuable material. The best way of doing this is actually bringing a sample of information. Suvorov observes that "this is perhaps the only way to convince the GRU that they can trust the person".

Suvorov describes an ideal; the one-time head of the GRU, Gen. Ivan Serov, was willing to explore potential agents who gave plausible information about themselves and their access, or a "write-in" whose potential could be verified before a meeting.

==== General assessment ====
It has been the general experience of intelligence agencies that potential recruits, recruits early in the development process, and those currently reporting to a local case officer, still need to be checked against master biographical and other files, which will help spot foreign counterintelligence. This counterintelligence interest could be from their own or third countries.

Once an individual is seen to have potential access to information, the recruiting officer or staff considers why a presumably loyal and trusted individual might be willing to betray his own side. A basic set of reasons are the classic MICE motivations, with further insights in attitudes predisposing to cooperation.

Headquarters may have access to information that a field office does not, such as being able to access credit records to identify financial stress, through a cutout that hides the request as having come from country B's service. Another area where a central office can help is to correlate possible penetration attempts by an individual who approaches one's own, or allied, intelligence services in different locations, as, for example, embassies in different cities.

There are both local and headquarters-based means of validation. The case officer should compare information, provided by the agent, with locally known facts, both from overt and covert sources. Some services, especially the Russian/Soviet, may not have formal or extensive OSINT, and either the case officer may need to check such things (or set up checkable requests) within the station/residency.

Some definite warnings, which may come from local or headquarters reporting, include:

- The agent's information contradicts other information believed to be true
- The agent's information has appeared in local open sources
- The information is true, but is too old to be of operational value. This was one of the key techniques of the World War II British Double Cross System
- If there are inconsistencies in the agent's life story, which the case officer can query periodically through social conversation, the truth is usually in the consistent aspects. It is easier to make a mistake in keeping up a lie, than in telling the truth, which is the reason criminal investigators ask a suspect to repeat their statements.
- If the agent makes predictions, be very sure to see if they become true
- In the event that the recruiting officer's service uses technical means of detecting evasion, such as polygraphy, voice stress analysis, interviews by psychologists and psychiatrists, and perhaps more in the future, brain imaging, make use of these within the agency policy. Be aware that penetrators may be trained to resist them.

== Access agents and access techniques ==
An access agent does not have significant access to material of intelligence value, but has contact with those who do. Such a person could be as simple as the barber outside a military base, or as complex as a mid or high level staff officer of any organization, or think tank (i.e., outside the government), who can deal on a regular basis with both hostile and friendly government personnel with such access to sensitive material that it may warrant for their individual or joint recruitment, upon the recommendation from the access agent, by the intelligence apparatus for which the access agent is actually working for.

Within private and public organizations that handle sensitive material, human resource workers, receptionists, and other seemingly low-level personnel know a great deal about the people with sensitive access. Certain employees, such as guards and janitors, who have no formal access, still may be able to gain access to secured rooms and containers; there is a blurry area between an access agent that might let your collector into an area, and a support employee who can collect information that he may or may not understand.

=== Love, honeypots, and recruitment ===
U.S. intelligence services, for example, are concerned when their own personnel could be subject to sexual blackmail. This applied to any homosexual relationship until the mid-1990s, and also applied to heterosexual relationships with most foreign nationals. See honeypots in espionage fiction for fictional examples. In some cases, especially when the national was a citizen of a friendly nation, the relationship needed to be reported. Failure to do so, even with a friendly nation, could result in dismissal.

One former CIA officer said that while sexual entrapment was not generally a good tool to recruit a foreign official, it was sometimes employed successfully to solve short-term problems. Seduction is a classic technique; "swallow" was the KGB tradecraft term for women, and "raven" the term for men, trained to seduce intelligence targets.

During the Cold War, the KGB (and allied services, including the East German Stasi under Markus Wolf, and the Cuban Intelligence Directorate [formerly known as Dirección General de Inteligencia or DGI]) frequently sought to entrap CIA officers. The KGB believed that Americans were sex-obsessed materialists, and that U.S. spies could easily be entrapped by sexual lures. The best-known incident, however, was that of Clayton Lonetree, a Marine guard supervisor at the Embassy of the United States in Moscow, who was seduced by a "swallow" who worked as a translator at the embassy. Once the seduction took place, she put him in touch with a KGB handler. The espionage continued after his transfer to Vienna, although he eventually turned himself in.

The Soviets used sex not only for direct recruitment, but as a contingency for a possible future need of kompromat of an American officer. The CIA itself made limited use of sexual recruitment against foreign intelligence services. "Coercive recruitment generally didn't work. We found that offers of money and freedom worked better". If the Agency found a Soviet intelligence officer had a girlfriend, they would try to recruit the girlfriend as an access agent. Once the CIA personnel had access to the Soviet officer, they might attempt to double him.

Examples of people trapped by sexual means include:

- Robert Osman, an American soldier stationed in Panama Canal Zone in 1933, was involved in a "honey trap" - Frema Karry, a young Russian girl in Robert Gordon Switz's network. Osman provided war plans. He was arrested, represented by socialist lawyer Louis Waldman (later lawyer for Walter Krivitsky), and imprisoned for 25 years
- John Vassall, a British embassy official in Moscow, who was guided by the KGB into having sex with multiple male partners while drunk in 1954. The KGB then used photographs of this incident to blackmail Vassall into providing them with secret information.
- Sir Geoffrey Harrison, the British Ambassador to the Soviet Union, was recalled to London in 1968 after he admitted to the Foreign Office that he had been having an affair with a Russian chambermaid at the embassy, of which he had been shown compromising photographs by the KGB.
- Mordechai Vanunu, an Israeli nuclear whistleblower who was lured by an Mossad agent to Italy where he was drugged and kidnapped to Israel.
- Clayton J. Lonetree, a U.S. Marine Sergeant embassy guard in Moscow, was entrapped by a female Soviet officer in 1987. He was then blackmailed into handing over documents when he was assigned to Vienna. Lonetree was the first U.S. Marine to be convicted of spying against the United States.
- Irvin C. Scarbeck, a U.S. diplomat, was entrapped by a female Polish officer in 1961 and photographed in a compromising position. He was blackmailed into providing secrets.
- Sharon Scranage, a CIA employee described as a "shy, naive, country girl", was allegedly seduced by Ghanaian intelligence agent Michael Soussoudis. She later gave him information on CIA operations in Ghana, which was later shared with Soviet-bloc countries.
- In 2006, the British Defence Attaché in Islamabad was recalled home when it emerged that he had been involved in a relationship with a Pakistani woman, who was an intelligence agent. While the British Government deny that secrets were lost, other sources say that several Western operatives and operations within Pakistan were compromised.
- In May 2007 a female officer serving in Sweden's Kosovo force was suspected of having leaked classified information to her Serbian lover who turned out to be a spy.
- Won Jeong-hwa, who was arrested by South Korea in 2008 and charged with spying for North Korea, was accused of using this method to obtain information from an army officer.

=== Spotting through emotional attachment ===
Yet other factors may apply. True friendship or romance may draw others to become involved with a current agent. John Anthony Walker, who spied for money, recruited friends and relatives. Rosario Ames, wife of Aldrich Ames, was brought into her husband's activities.

Katrina Leung is one of the more complex cases, who came to the United States on a Taiwanese passport, became involved with a PRC activist, on whom she was recruited to report to the FBI. She seduced her FBI case officer, and eventually was recruited by the FBI as a "dangle" to PRC targets, specifically in the Chinese Ministry of State Security (MSS). Her first reports were independently confirmed by the CIA. Later, however, she was found to be passing FBI documents to the MSS, while still reporting to the FBI. While she was allowed, at first, to continue, on the belief that the information she provided to the United States was more important than that which she was giving to the PRC, she was eventually arrested and charged with a relatively low-level crime. Eventually, that was dismissed for reasons of prosecutorial misconduct, although a subsequent U.S. government appeal resulted in a plea bargain. Her true loyalty was never made public, but, at various times, she appears to have been a dangled mole and a doubled agent, as well as possibly a PRC access agent to FBI personnel.

== Development ==
Development, the preparation for actual recruiting, involves a direct approach by a case officer who has some existing access to the potential recruit, an indirect approach through an access agent or proprietary, or has reason to risk a "cold" approach. Before the direct recruitment, there may be a delicate period of development.

The case officer, possibly through an access agent, works on establishing a relationship. This phase, in which the potential agent is called a developmental, has not yet reached the recruiting pitch. After the cultivation stage, overt contact is established with the candidate under the guise of an official meeting. After the acquaintanceship has ripened and official meetings evolve into personal meetings, the developmental stage begins.

=== "Crash" vs gradual approach ===
Suvorov describes the "crash approach" as the most demanding form of recruitment, which is to be done only if the local rezident, or chief of the GRU unit, convinces GRU headquarters that the risk is worthwhile. "Quite a few examples are known of recruitment at the first meeting, of course following the secret cultivation which has gone on for many months".

"The crash approach, or 'love at first sight' in GRU jargon, has a number of irrefutable advantages. Contact with the future agent takes place only once, instead of at meetings over many months, as is the case with the gradual approach. After the first contact the newly recruited agent will himself take action on his own security. He will never talk to his wife, or tell her that he has a charming friend in the Soviet military attaché who is also very interested in stamp collecting."

=== Becoming compromised during development ===
Telling one's wife or colleagues about a charming Soviet friend can compromise the entire development. The United States is also aware that the Soviet developmental process is, preferably, gradual. "The developmental stage cements the relationship and encourages loyalty to it. The hostile intelligence officer may then, through friendly persuasion, ask for a very innocent and insignificant favor from the candidate and pay him generously for it, thus placing the candidate in a position of obligation. During this stage the future agent becomes accustomed to being asked favors and fulfilling them accurately. The future agent's ambitions, financial and work problems, hobbies, etc., are continuously assessed by an intelligence team to exacerbate weaknesses. The future agent's professional, social, and private personalities are soon stripped away.

It is the goal of the case officer, with appropriate support from his organization, to learn vulnerabilities, build trust, and solve problems for the developmental. These are all preparatory steps to asking, perhaps subtly, the developmental to betray his own side.

Information requests begin innocently, usually asking for public information, but to get the development on the path to betrayal. At first, any requests for documents are for open ones, which the case officer gives some pretext for not himself obtaining. A creative task officer may then ask for a technically restricted, but still fairly innocent document, such as an unclassified telephone directory.

The interaction becomes more sensitive, especially when the case officer asks for something technically classified, but with an explanation that lets the potential recruit rationalize that he is not really betraying any trust. During this time, the case officer is building psychological control. In some cases, it may be possible to get useful information without ever asking the developmental to betray his country. These cases may mean the role of the recruit is not to be as a direct agent, but perhaps as an access or a support agent. The recruit may not even be witting of his relationship to a FIS.

Finally, the relationship will move from clandestine to overt, when the foreign service has significant compromising information on the asset. If the asset had been motivated by money, he will find the tasks given him may become more challenging, but the payments reduce, because he is no longer in a position to negotiate.

=== Recruitment through professional interests ===
The traditional openness of the scientific community can be exploited to obtain information from an individual with access to commercially, scientifically, or militarily valuable material. "There is another important source, peculiar to scientific intelligence. This is the body of experts in particular fields of science available in one's own country for consultation. The phenomena of nature are independent of political boundaries, and the experts are in the position of agents spying on these phenomena insofar as they throw light on the feasibility of a suspected enemy development".

A 1998 document describes typical foreign intelligence recruitment against citizens with access to sensitive technology. "Hostile intelligence services begin the agent recruitment process by scrupulously collecting information on persons who are connected to industry, RDT&E laboratories, government institution staffs, military bases, and design organizations". A candidate for recruitment usually fulfills the following criteria:

- They must be in a position to provide information of real use to the hostile intelligence service, either to steal or copy S&T information, to communicate secret information by word of mouth, or to recruit new agents.
- There must exist motives by means of which an individual can be recruited:
  - Financial considerations/greed (transcends all other motives)
  - Revenge/disaffection
  - Blackmail/hostage Situations (used in USSR but very infrequently in United States)
  - Appeal to emigre's national pride
  - Exploitation of an emotional involvement
  - False flag approaches
  - Exploitation of an American's naiveté
  - Sex
  - Ideology (which is no longer the motivation it was during the Cold War; the Soviet service changed its emphasis to concentrate on sympathy for "persecuted" elements of American, or other targeted, society)

== Recruitment ==
If the decision is made to make a formal recruitment, the case officer gets the developmental accustomed to meeting in more obscure places and at more unusual times. These can have the function of countersurveillance, during which additional officers may be watching the meeting, and the travel to it, for evidence of "country A" counterintelligence interest. Without the developmental fully realizing it, he is being drawn into increasingly treasonous activity, which would be harder and harder to explain were he caught. It is considered important for the case officer to offer money, perhaps dismissed as covering expenses, but really as a means of compromising the developmental.

Eventually, especially if the recruit is ideologically sympathetic to Country B, the case officer makes the direct recruitment pitch. This may not work, and, in fact, may induce rage. The case officer has to be prepared for physical defense and escape if this becomes necessary. If the case officer can produce compromising photographs, receipts, etc., even an originally ideological subject now moves into the realm of compromise.

=== Recruiting through business relationships ===
As part of Technical intelligence gathering, key business personnel, or even a business itself, might be recruited. Both the KGB and GRU used this route. The KGB service for this was Line X, which reported to Directorate T of the KGB First Chief Directorate. The GRU ran recruitments at industry trade shows. Suvorov explains that recruitment was extremely effective with small firms: "The owner of a small firm, even a very successful one, is always at great risk, always keen to strengthen his situation...In any case, if he sells his product he can hide the fact from the authorities. It is equally easy for him to hide the money he has received". The businessman, however, may forget that while he might not report the cash transaction to his own government, the GRU certainly has recorded the act of payment, and can use it for subsequent blackmail.

Suvorov explained that while the most strategic information appears to be associated with major firms, there are several reasons why an approach to a smaller company is the place to begin.

- In many products, the true breakthroughs are not the entire aircraft or tank, but some subcomponent.
1. People recruited in small firms may become access agents for recruitments in large companies.

=== Legalizing illegal agents ===
While usual practice is to recruit residents of the country being targeted, there have been instances where the FIS brought illegal agents into that country. Common practice was to have them enter via a third country, and perhaps claim to be immigrants from a fourth.

The introduction of an "illegal" might be due to the need to bring a specialist in to carry out some part of the operation. The Soviet KGB had a Department V, staffed with officers qualified to kill or to carry out sabotage.

Specialists of the FIS might also need legalization to carry out clandestine intelligence collection. The United States has had a group of CIA and NSA specialists who would emplace technical sensors, ranging from telephone taps to specialized devices for measuring weapons tests, into the target country.

Obtaining the documentation and other resources is the role of legalizing agents and documentalists. Candidate for this category of agents are sought among officials of the police and passport departments, consular clerks, customs and immigration officials, and small employers of labor. Agent legalizers are subjected to especially thorough vetting, because the fate of illegals is entrusted to them. When a Soviet illegal arrives in a country the task of the legalizing agent is to ensure the issue of documents by making the necessary entries in the registration books and to ensure that the illegal is in possession of the necessary documentation.

A common technique was to find birth records of someone known later to have died. The "documentation agent" who did this would not have contact with illegals.

== See also ==
- Useful Idiot
