= Nadezhda Ulanovskaya =

Soviet GRU spy, English teacher and translator (1903–1986)

- Born: Esther Markovna Fridgant; 1903; Bershad
- Died: 1986 (aged 82–83); Tel Aviv
- Spouse: Alexander Ulanovsky
- Children: Maya Ulanovskaya
- Espionage activity
- Allegiance: Soviet Union
- Service branch: GRU
- Service years: 1923–1948

Nadezhda (Esther) Markovna Ulanovskaya (1903–1986), nicknamed Nadia or Nadya, was a Soviet intelligence GRU officer, translator, English teacher, wife of Alexander Ulanovsky, and mother of Maya Ulanovskaya.

== Background ==
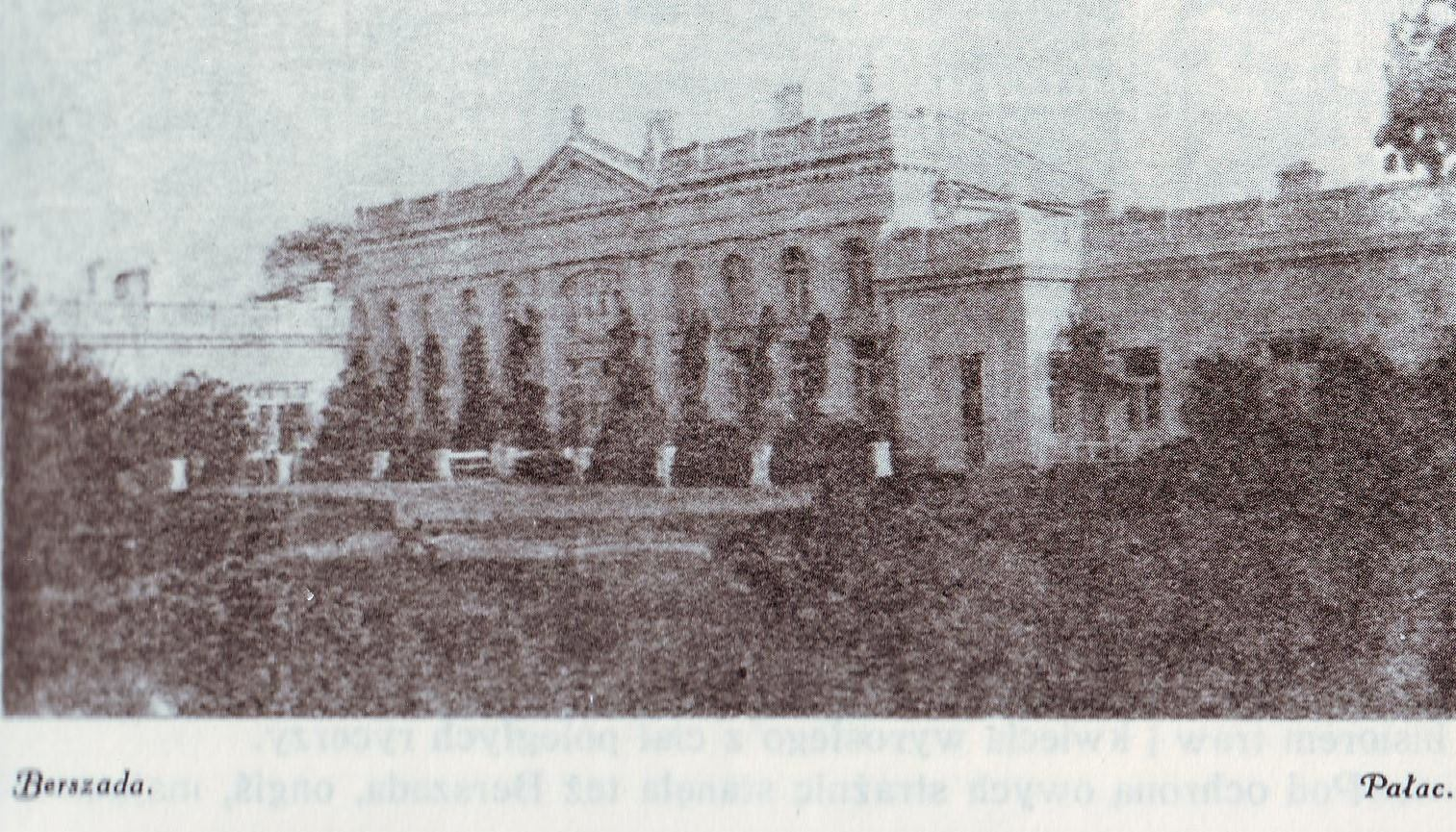
Former Moszyński Palace in Bershad, Ulanovskaya's birthplace

Nadezhda Ulanovskaya was born Esther Markovna Fridgant in Bershad in the then Russian Empire (now Ukraine). Her father was a trader; her grandfather Nukhim Fridgant was a rabbi and possibly a descendant of a Hasidic tzaddik Reful (Friedgant). Ulanovskaya studied in private and village schools. In 1917, after the February Revolution, the family moved to Odessa.

== Career ==
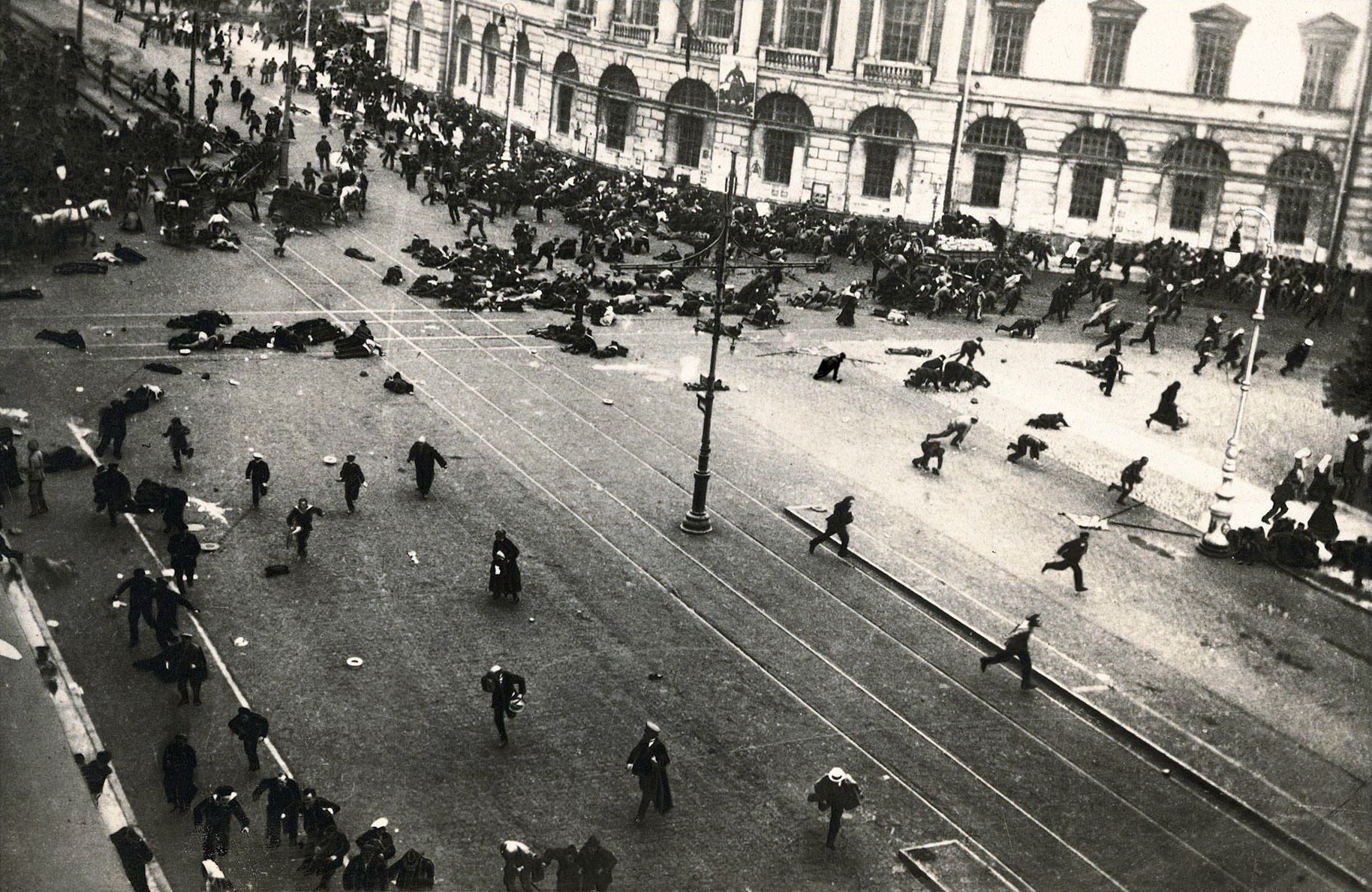
Ulanovskaya supported the October Revolution (here, Saint Petersburg on 4 July 1917 during demonstration on Nevsky Prospekt following machine gunning by troops of Provisional Government)

After the 1917 October Revolution, Ulanovskaya joined the Young Revolutionary International as an anarchist and changed her name from Esther to Nadezhda ("Hope"). During the Russian Civil War, she worked for the pro-Soviet underground in Odessa by distributing leaflets. At this time, she met her future husband, Alexander Ulanovsky. In April 1919, during the flight of White Russians from Odessa, she helped occupy the Odessa police station. In August 1919, ahead of the White Russian re-occupation of Odessa, she evacuated with Ulanovsky to Nikolaev (Mykolaiv in Ukraine) and eventually returned to Odessa. In 1921, she and Ulanovsky visited Germany on behalf of the Cheka. In 1922, they moved to Moscow.

=== Communism ===
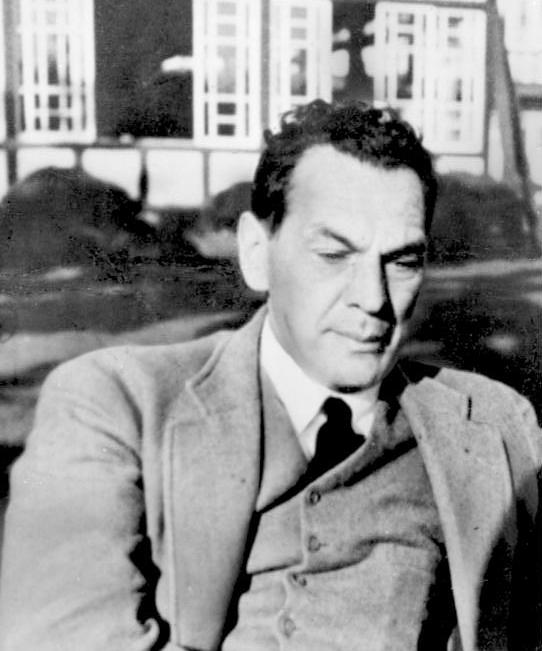
In 1928, Ulanovskaya was stationed by the GRU with her husband and Richard Sorge (here in 1940)

In 1923, under the name of "Maria Andreyevna Sorokina," Ulanovskaya worked with her husband in Hamburg for the Profintern, after which the Ulanovskys returned to Moscow (still with the Profintern).

In 1928, the Ulanovskys joined the Soviet military intelligence service (or GRU). With Richard Sorge, they were stationed in Shanghai. In 1929, she went with her husband to China as a lieutenant for "technical work." Her job there was radio operator under the name of a Sudeten German "Kirschner." In 1930, the Ulanovskys were expelled from Shanghai.

In 1930–1931, the Ulanovskys lived in Berlin and Paris. In 1931, they traveled to the United States as Canadians named "Goldman" and then operated in the US under the surname "Zhuratovich." While stationed in New York 1932–4 as employees of AMTORG, one of the agents in their spy network was Whittaker Chambers. While stationed in the US, Ulanovskaya met her uncle, who had immigrated to the US in 1913.

At some point 1933–1935, the Ulanovskys were stationed in Denmark to support Soviet espionage in Germany (after Adolf Hitler's takeover in early 1933 and uprooting of Soviet intelligence in Germany). Her husband was caught and imprisoned in a public spy scandal.

In 1932 (or 1934?), Ulanovskaya returned to Moscow, where, still in Soviet military intelligence, she studied at the Institute of Foreign Languages through 1941. She also worked as an English teacher at the Frunze Military Academy.

During the Great Purge, the Ulanovskys "broke with the party." Ulanovsky had to leave the Fourth Section of the Red Army (Intelligence, aka GRU).

During World War II, Ulanovsky fought in the war, during which he was demoted to captain and wounded; Ulanovskaya sent her children East with her mother to Chelyabinsk for safety. She worked with foreign correspondents with the Commissariat of Foreign Affairs, including work in the Far East. In 1947, she taught English at the Institute of International Relations; in December 1947, she was dismissed due to pending arrest.

=== GULAG ===
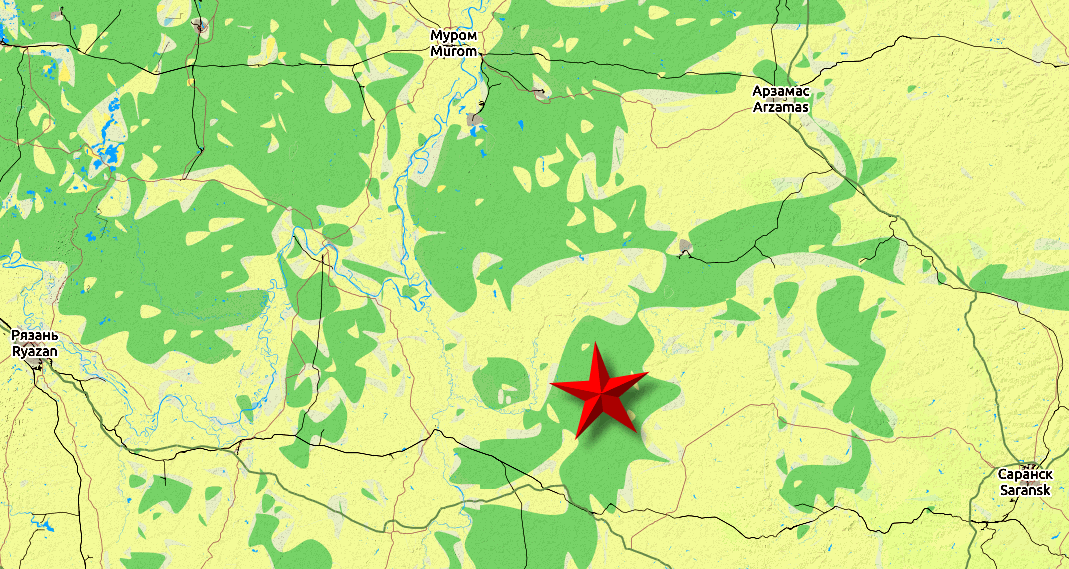
Dubravlag, where Ulanovskaya served prison time

On 21 February 1948, Ulanovskaya was arrested for treason, specifically the transfer of information about the Great Purge for Australian Godfrey Blunden for the 1947 book A Room on the Route published in the US. She was locked in solitary confinement in the Lefortovo prison. (Her husband was arrested on 3 March 1949.) Accused of working with a British and American spy, she was not allowed to sleep for 13 days and nights.

In 1951, she received a 15-year sentence in labor camps. She served time in Rechlag and then Dubravlag. (In 1951, her daughter was also arrested and in 1952 sentenced to 25 years.) In May 1956, Soviet authorities reclassified her crime to "disclosure of official secrets," reduced the sentence to the time already served, and released her.

=== Later years ===
In 1961, her younger daughter died. In 1971, her husband died.

In 1973, Ulanovskaya immigrated to Israel with her daughter Maya, son-in-law, and grandson.

In 1977, mother and daughter visited Godfrey Blunden in Europe.

In July 1977, C. L. Sulzberger of the New York Times visited Ulanovskaya in Israel and published some recollections of her from his days in Moscow as bureau chief 1943–5.

On 26 July 1977, in London, Ulanovskaya appeared on an episode called "The Soviet Intelligence Apparatus" on Firing Line, a talk show hosted by William F. Buckley Jr.:

Ulanovskaya: When we were in the States [in the Thirties], it was the first time—not that I began to doubt, but that I felt, with some reason, we couldn't do what the capitalists had achieved... In the States, in spite of that terrible time of the Depression... to us it didn't look terrible at all.
Buckley: You mean by contrast with what you had experienced?
Ulanovskaya: We saw those jobless people who still ate better... You know, some Communist sympathizers once showed us some slums, but those slums didn't impress me at all.
Buckley: Made you feel at home?
Ulanovskaya: Well, the way we personally lived in Moscow at that time was worse.

== Personal life and death ==
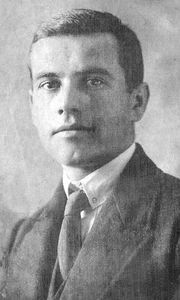
Ulanovskaya married Alexander Petrovich Ulanovsky, fellow Soviet spy

By 1922, Ulanovskaya had married Alexander Ulanovsky. They had a son and two daughters, of whom one is named Maya Ulanovskaya.

According to Sulzberger's 1977 memoir, Ulanovskaya had never heard of Alger Hiss, and her husband had no contact with Kim Philby, Guy Burgess, or Donald McLean.

On 5 January 1986, Nadezhda Ulanovskaya died in Israel.

== Works ==
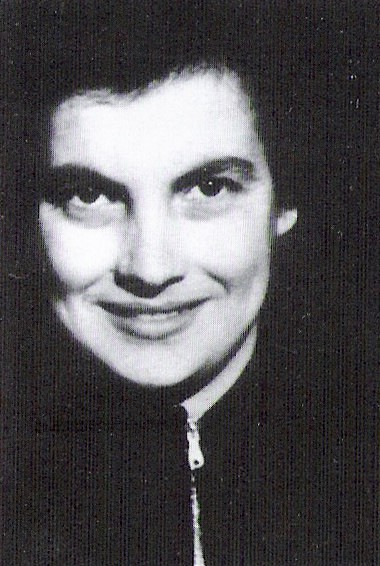
Ulanovskaya wrote a memoir with her daughter, Maya Ulanovskaya (here, circa 1955)

In 1982, she published in the US, together with her daughter, a memoir book The Story of One Family.

Regarding the Hiss Case, Ulavoskaya wrote (quoted from the new English edition of their memoir): "My story has many parallels with that of Whittaker Chambers. We met the same people, and I can thus confirm his testimony."

== See also ==
- Alexander Ulanovsky
- Maya Ulanovskaya
- Anatoly Yakobson
- Alexander Yakobson
- List of Gulag camps

== External sources ==
- Firing Line - "The Soviet Intelligence Apparatus" with Nadia Ulanovskaia (video)
