= Yechezkel Kotik =

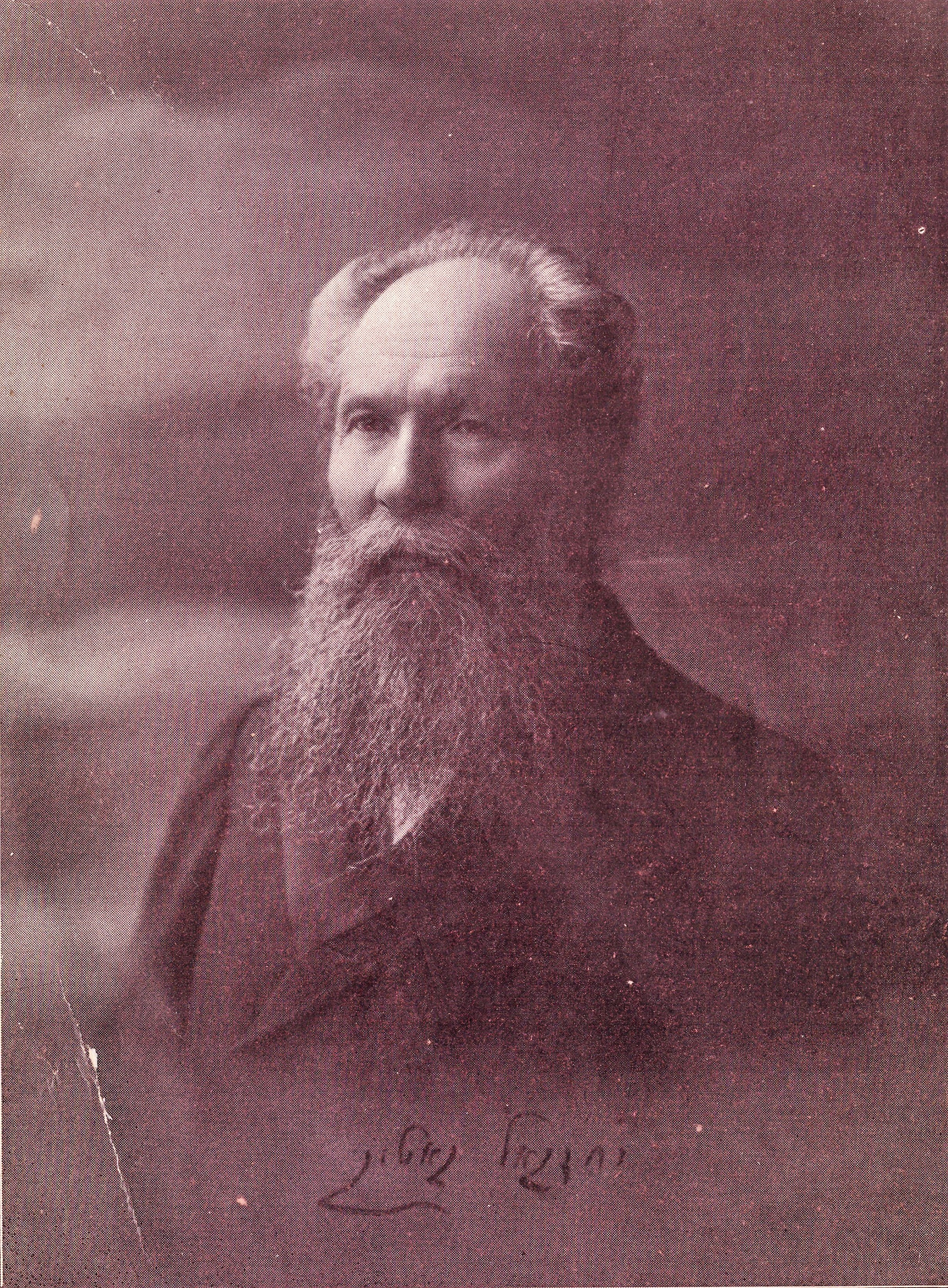
Yechezkel Kotik, photo from his book Mayne zikhroynes, 1913

Yechezkel Kotik (Yekheskel, Ezekiel; March 25, 1847 – August 13, 1921) was a Yiddish author.

== Biography ==
He was born in Kamyenyets (Kamenets, Kamieniec Litewski, Kamenets-Litovsk), Russian Empire, modern day Belarus. He lived in Kiev, but after the 1881 pogroms he fled to Warsaw, where he founded a cheder and later opened a coffeehouse with a telephone (one of the first ones in the city). He was a public man and philanthropist, and organized charities ("Achiezer", "Ezrath Holim" and others). He published brochures in Hebrew and Yiddish. His most famous work is his memoirs in Yiddish (2 vols.) where he describes the life of a Jewish shtetl. The memoirs were highly appreciated by Sholem Aleichem and I.L. Peretz; they were published in several editions and translated into several languages.

== Editions of the memoirs ==
- Mayne zikhroynes (My memories), Warsaw 1912–13; Berlin 1922.
- Translation to German: Jecheskel Kotik, Das Haus meiner Grosseltern; Aus Kotiks Lebenserinnerungen übersetzt von Leo Hirsch, Berlin: Schocken, 1936.
- Translation to English - Journey to a Nineteenth-Century Shtetl: The Memoirs of Yekhezkel Kotik; edited with an introduction and notes by David Assaf; translated from the Yiddish by Margaret Birstein, Detroit: Wayne State University Press in cooperation with The Diaspora Research Institute, Tel Aviv University (Raphael Patai Series in Jewish Folklore and Anthropology), 2002.
- Translation to Hebrew by David Assaf (Tel-Aviv, Vol. 1 - 1998, Vol.2 - 2005).
- Translation to Russian by Maya Ulanovskaya (Jerusalem, Vol. 1 - 2009, vol. 2 - 2012).
