= Alexander Yakobson =

Israeli historian and political activist

- אלכסנדר יעקובסון
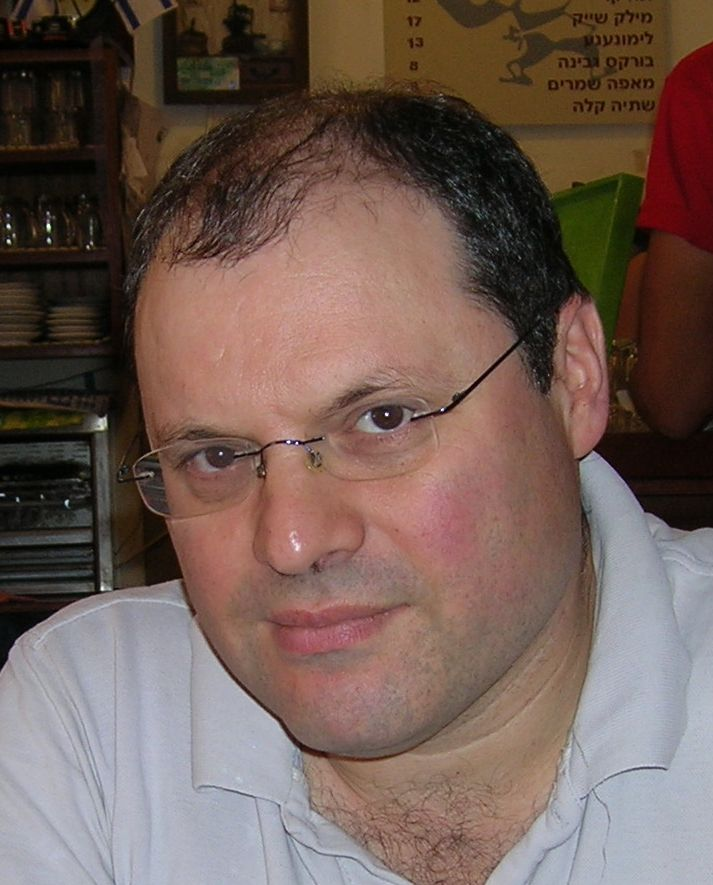
- Alexander Yakobson (2009)
- Born: Якобсон, Александр Анатольевич; October 5, 1959 (age 67); Moscow
- Occupation: Historian
- Parent(s): Anatoly Yakobson, Maya Ulanovskaya
- Relatives: Nadezhda Ulanovskaya, Alexander Ulanovsky

Academic background
- Education: Hebrew University of Jerusalem
- Thesis: Elections, electoral systems and the function of electoral assemblies in the late Roman Republic (1995)
- Doctoral advisor: Hanna M. Cotton
- Other advisor: Israel Schatzman

Academic work
- Discipline: Ancient History
- Sub-discipline: Classical Greco-Roman History
- Institutions: Hebrew University of Jerusalem
- Website: http://pluto.huji.ac.il/~yakobsona/

Alexander Anatolyevich Yakobson (Hebrew: אלכסנדר יעקובסון) is an Israeli historian, professor of Ancient history at the Hebrew University of Jerusalem, political activist, and commentator.

== Background ==
Alexander Anatolyevich Yakobson was born on October 5, 1959, in Moscow. His parents were Soviet dissidents Anatoly Yakobson and Maya Ulanovskaya. His grandparents were Soviet spies Alexander Ulanovsky and Nadezhda Ulanovskaya. Yakobson immigrated to Israel with his family (mother, father, and grandmother) at age 13. He earned his degrees from the Hebrew University of Jerusalem: BA cum laude in History and Political Science (1985), MA in History (1989), and doctorate in Ancient History (1995). He also conducted postdoctoral research at the University of Cologne.

== Career ==
=== Academia ===
In 1995, Yakobson was appointed assistant professor of History at the University of Haifa through 1997. In 2000, he was appointed as a senior lecturer in history at the Hebrew University of Jerusalem. In 2011, he was appointed associate professor of Ancient history at the Hebrew University.

=== Political activism ===
Yakobson is a former Meretz activist and Peace Now member with a regular op-ed column in the newspaper Haaretz. He is a supporter of a two-state solution to the Israeli-Palestinian conflict. He co-wrote Israel and the Family of Nations: The Jewish Nation State and Human Rights with former Israeli minister Amnon Rubinstein, which seeks to assert Israel's right to exist as a Jewish state.

He is an Advisory Editor at "Fathom: For a deeper understanding of Israel and the region".

== Works ==
- Yakobson, Alexander (1999). Elections and electioneering in Rome a study in the political system of the Late Republic. Steiner. p. 251. ISBN 3-515-07481-3.
- Yakobson, Alexander; Amnon Rubinstein (2008-09-08). Israel and the Family of Nations: The Jewish Nation-State and Human Rights (1 ed.). Routledge. p. 246. ISBN 978-0-415-46441-3.

== See also ==
- Anatoly Yakobson
- Maya Ulanovskaya
- Nadezhda Ulanovskaya
- Alexander Ulanovsky
