= The Lost Spy =

2008 book by Andrew Meier

The Lost Spy: An American in Stalin's Secret Service
- Author: Andrew Meier
- Publisher: W. W. Norton & Company
- Publication date: 2008

The Lost Spy: An American in Stalin's Secret Service is a 2008 book by Andrew Meier, published by W. W. Norton & Company. It recounts the story of Isaiah Oggins, a 1920s New York intellectual murdered in 1947 on Stalin's orders.

== Reviews ==
- WhittakerChambers.org (2008-07-04)
- Boston Globe (2008-08-10)
- New York Times (2008-08-22)
- Richmond Times-Dispatch (2008-08-24)
- Washington Post (2008-08-24)
- Los Angeles Times (2008-08-25)
- Норильлаг - Ресурсы Интернет
