= Clayton J. Lonetree =

US Marine, spy for Soviet Union (born 1961)

Clayton J. Lonetree (born November 6, 1961) is a former U.S. Marine who was court-martialed and convicted of espionage for the Soviet KGB; he served nine years in prison for espionage. During the early 1980s, Lonetree was a Marine Corps Security Guard stationed at the Embassy of the United States in Moscow.

Lonetree is the first U.S. Marine to be convicted of spying against the United States. Lonetree, who was stationed in Moscow as a guard at the U.S. Embassy in the early 1980s, confessed in 1987 to selling documents to the Soviet Union. Lonetree was seduced by a 25-year-old female KGB officer named "Violetta Seina" in that year. He was then blackmailed into handing over documents when he was assigned to Vienna, Austria, including the blueprints of the U.S. Embassy buildings in Moscow and Vienna and the names and identities of U.S. undercover intelligence agents in the Soviet Union.

== Early life and education ==
Lonetree's father is a Native American of the Ho-Chunk, and his mother is a Native American of the Navajo.

== Career ==
Lonetree was tried in a court martial at Quantico, Virginia and convicted of all 13 counts - six of espionage, three of conspiracy to commit espionage and four of violating general regulations - on August 21, 1987.

Lonetree faced the possibility of a life sentence or being executed, but initially received a 30-year sentence with a reduction in rank from E-5 to E-1, a fine of $5,000 (equivalent to $14,000 in 2025), the loss of all military pay and allowances, and a dishonorable discharge.

In 1989, the Commandant of the Marine Corps, Gen. Alfred M. Gray Jr., wrote a letter to the Secretary of the Navy recommending that Lonetree's sentence be reduced from 30 to 15 years. Gray wrote that the effect of Private Lonetree's actions "was minimal." In addition, he said, the Marine's motivation "was not treason or greed, but rather the lovesick response of a naive, young, immature and lonely troop in a lonely and hostile environment." Lonetree's sentence was subsequently reduced to 15 years.

In May 1991, Lonetree filed an appeal, asking that his conviction and sentence be overturned because he had never learned the identity of one accuser, but this was denied.

Some of the serious security breaches at the embassy which were alleged to have been the work of Lonetree were found to have been done by CIA mole Aldrich Ames.

Lonetree was released in 1996 after serving nine years at the United States Disciplinary Barracks.

According to Time magazine:

Marine Sergeant Clayton Lonetree, 25, was so highly regarded at his job as security guard at the U.S. embassy in Moscow that in November 1985 he was detached for special duty at the Reagan–Gorbachev summit in Geneva. Last week Lonetree sat in a brig at the Marine base at Quantico, Va., suspected by his superiors of helping the Soviet KGB filch classified U.S. documents from diplomatic offices in Moscow and Vienna. Lonetree, authorities said, had an affair with a female KGB agent who was reportedly working as a translator at the embassy.

In 2001, Lonetree testified as an expert witness at the trial of former United States Army Reserve Colonel George Trofimoff, who was charged with spying for the KGB. After remorsefully describing his own recruitment by the Soviet State, Lonetree publicly sobbed on the witness stand and apologized for his actions. Colonel Trofimoff was subsequently convicted of espionage and sentenced to life imprisonment.

== See also ==
- Honeypot
