= Grigory Mairanovsky =

Soviet biochemist who started NKVD poison study program

Grigory Moiseevich Mairanovsky
- Григорий Моисеевич Майрановский
- Born: 1899; Batumi, Kutais Governorate, Russian Empire
- Died: 1964 (age 64 or 65); Makhachkala, Dagestan ASSR, RSFSR, USSR
- Known for: establishing NKVD poison study program

Grigory Moiseevich Mairanovsky (Russian: Григо́рий Моисе́евич Майрано́вский, 1899, Batumi – 1964) was a Soviet biochemist and poison developer.

== Career ==
Mairanovsky was born to a Jewish family in Batumi in 1899.

Mairanovsky was the head of several secret laboratories in the Bach Institute of Biochemistry in Moscow (1928–1935). As the head of Laboratory No. 1 (1938–1946), he initiated the secret poison program conducted by the NKVD. He used political prisoners for experiments with poisons. His classified PhD thesis defended in 1940 was entitled "Biological activity of the products of interaction of mustard gas with [human] skin tissues".

Mairanovsky participated personally in political assassinations as a member of Pavel Sudoplatov's team in the 1940s, including assassination of Isaiah Oggins.

He was arrested as a part of the doctors' plot in 1951, in connection with the case of Viktor Abakumov, and spent 10 years in prison. After his release, he headed a biochemical laboratory in Makhachkala, Dagestan ASSR.

== Legacy ==
He appears as a character in the Russian film Prediction by Eldar Ryazanov and has a tiny cameo mention in The Eighth Life, the prize-winning epic novel by Nino Haratischwili.
