= Gorn address =

Method of identifying and addressing any node within a tree data structure

A Gorn address (Gorn, 1967) is a method of identifying and addressing any node within a tree data structure. This notation is often used for identifying nodes in a parse tree defined by phrase structure rules.

The Gorn address is a sequence of zero or more integers conventionally separated by dots, e.g., 0 or 1.0.1. The root which Gorn calls * can be regarded as the empty sequence. And the $j$-th child of the $i$-th child has an address $i.j$, counting from 0.

It is named after American computer scientist Saul Gorn.

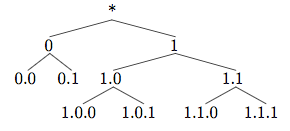
