= Arvid Jacobson =

Finnish-American communist who spied for the Soviet Union

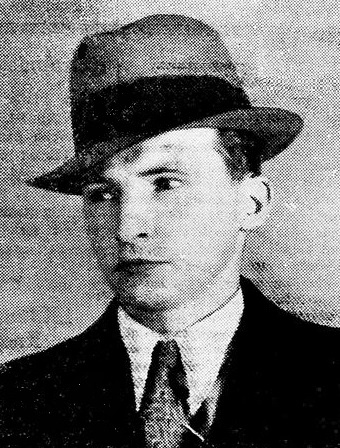
Arvid Jacobson

Arvid Werner Jacobson (November 12, 1904 – April 1, 1976) was a Finnish-American communist who spied for the Soviet Union in the 1930s.

== Biography ==
Jacobson's parents were Finnish immigrants from Lapua, Ostrobotnia. Jacobson was born in Covington, Michigan and was working as a high school teacher in Northville when, in the fall of 1932, he was recruited to work for the Soviet Military Intelligence by the Comintern agent "Mrs. Morton", a pseudonym of Aino Kuusinen, the wife of the Finnish communist leader Otto Wille Kuusinen.

With his wife Sally, he traveled to New York, where the fledgling GRU agent Whittaker Chambers was assigned the task of meeting Jacobson and making a fitness report. Chambers advised against using Jacobson as an underground agent because of his truculent temperament and the fact that he was missing fingers on one hand.

Nevertheless, the GRU sent him to Europe as part of an apparatus of Soviet agents, led by the wife of Alfred Tilton, that operated in Finland.

The Finnish police uncovered the group after the suspected army officer Vilho Pentikäinen fled to the Soviet Union with military secrets. Jacobson was arrested in October 1933, along with his wife Sally, and he promptly confessed to his role as an agent and revealed the existence of another Soviet apparatus working in Paris, which included Lydia Stahl and Robert Gordon Switz.

After a secret trial, the Finnish court sentenced Jacobson to six years imprisonment in April 1934. He was subsequently pardoned in July 1935 and extradited to the United States.

== Career ==
Jacobson was hired to teach mathematics at Wayne State University in 1944. He became active in the field of computing, and in the late 1950s directed a program at Wayne State to develop a computer capable of translating between human languages.

Jacobson was a member of the Association for Computing Machinery (ACM), and in 1958 he served with Saul Gorn, Melvin A. Shader, and Edmund Berkeley on an ACM committee investigating the social responsibilities of computer scientists.

He retired in 1966 and died in Novi, Michigan in 1976.

== Sources ==
- Chambers, Whittaker (1952). Witness. Random House. ISBN 0-89526-571-0.
- John Earl Haynes and Harvey Klehr, Venona: Decoding Soviet Espionage in America, Yale University Press (1999), pgs. 375, 469.
- Aino Kuusinen, The Rings of Destiny: Inside Soviet Russia from Lenin to Brezhnev, Morrow, 1974.
- Allen Weinstein, Perjury: The Hiss–Chambers Case, New York: Random House, (1997), pg. 106
