= Saul Gorn =

American computer scientist

Saul Gorn (10 November 1912 – 22 February 1992) was an American pioneer in computer and information science who was a member of the School of Engineering and Applied Science at the University of Pennsylvania for more than 30 years.

Gorn was hired by the Moore School as an associate professor in 1955. He worked on the early ENIAC and EDVAC computers.

In 1958, Gorn was the chair of a committee created by the Association for Computing Machinery to investigate the social responsibility of computer scientists. He served on the committee with Melvin A. Shader, Arvid Jacobson, and Edmund Berkeley, who had petitioned for its creation.

The concept of a Gorn address comes from a paper by him, and the Association for Computing Machinery (ACM) presented him its Distinguished Service Award for 1974.

The Saul Gorn Memorial Lecture series has been established at the University of Pennsylvania in his memory.
