= Anatoly Yakobson =

Soviet dissident and Russian-Israeli poet

- Анатолий Якобсон
- Born: Anatoly Aleksandrovich Yakobson; April 30, 1935; Moscow, Soviet Union
- Died: September 28, 1978 (aged 43); Jerusalem, Israel
- Citizenship: Soviet Union; Israel
- Education: Moscow State Pedagogical University
- Occupations: literary critic, translator, teacher
- Known for: Editor of the Chronicle of Current Events and co-founder of the Initiative Group on Human Rights in the USSR
- Movement: Human rights movement in the Soviet Union
- Spouse: Maya Ulanovskaya

Anatoly Aleksandrovich Yakobson (Russian: Анато́лий Алекса́ндрович Якобсо́н; 30 April 1935, Moscow – 28 September 1978, Jerusalem) was a literary critic, teacher, poet and a central figure in the human rights movement in the Soviet Union.

== Biography ==
Yakobson was born in an ethnical Jewish family in 1935 in Moscow. From 1953 to 1958 he studied history at the Moscow State Pedagogical Institute.

Yakobson taught literature and history at Moscow's mathematical school #2. He included writers in his teaching which did not appear on the official syllabus, such as Mikhail Bulgakov, Alexander Solzhenitsyn, Anna Akhmatova or Osip Mandelshtam. He translated works by Paul Verlaine, Théophile Gautier and Hovhannes Tumanyan, Miguel Hernández and Federico García Lorca.

Yakobson was among those who spoke up against the Sinyavsky–Daniel trial in 1966, writing an open letter to the court.

In 1968, when the interest of the KGB in Yakobson's activities became too serious, he quit his position at the school, explaining to the director that it would not be in the school's interest to have one of its teachers arrested as an anti-Soviet dissident.

Yakobson went on to become a founding member of the dissident Initiative Group on Human Rights in the USSR in 1969. He put his signature under its first Appeal to The UN Committee for Human Rights. He resigned from the group after a courier from the emigre anti-Soviet organisation NTS contacted him, mistaking him for a co-conspirator.

Yakobson became chief editor of the samizdat human rights bulletin Chronicle of Current Events after the arrest of its first editor Natalya Gorbanevskaya in December 1969. He collated the material for issues 11–27 of the Chronicle until the end of 1972.

Threatened with arrest, Yakobson emigrated to Israel with spouse Maya Ulanovskaya and son Alexander Yakobson in 1973.

In 1978 Andrei Sakharov nominated Yakobson along with seven other Soviet dissidents for the Nobel Peace Prize.

Yakobson committed suicide on September 28, 1978.

== See also ==
- Maya Ulanovskaya
- Alexander Yakobson

== Sources ==
- Чуковская, Лидия Корнеевна; Ахматова, Анна Андреевна (2013). Записки о Анне Ахматовой (in Russian). Время. ISBN 978-5-9691-0803-5.
- Gilligan, Emma (2004). Defending Human Rights in Russia: Sergei Kovalyov, Dissident and Human Rights Commissioner, 1969–2003. London. ISBN 978-0415546119.
- Hopkins, Mark W. (1983). Russia's Underground Press: The Chronicle of Current Events. New York: Praeger. ISBN 0-03-062013-9.
- Horvath, Robert (2005). The Legacy of Soviet Dissent: Dissidents, Democratisation and Radical Nationalism in Russia. BASEES/Routledge Series on Russian and East European Studies. Vol. 17. London; New York: RoutledgeCurzon. ISBN 978-0-203-41285-5.
- Karp, Alexander; Vogeli, Bruce R. (2010). Russian Mathematics: Education History and World Significance. Singapore; Hackensack, N.J.: World Scientific. ISBN 978-981-4277-06-8.
- Sakharov, Andrei (8 February 1978). "Из письма в Нобелевский Комитет" [Excerpts from letter to the Nobel Committee] (in Russian).
- Yakobson, Anatoly (9 February 1966). "При свете совести. В московский городской суд" [In the light of conscience. Letter to Moscow City Court]. www.antho.net (in Russian).
- Yakobson, Anatoly; Yakir, Pyotr; Khodorovich, Tatyana; Podyapolskiy, Gregory; et al. (21 August 1969). "An Appeal to The UN Committee for Human Rights". The New York Review of Books.
- "Якобсон Анатолий Александрович (1935–1978)" [Yakobson, Anatoly Aleksandrovich (1935–1978)]. sakharov-center.ru (in Russian). Sakharov Center.

== Bibliography ==
- Якобсон, Анатолий (1992). Конец трагедии [The End of Tragedy] (in Russian). Вильнюс; Москва: Весть. ISBN 5-89942-252-1.
- Якобсон, Анатолий; Улановская, Майя (1992). Почва и судьба [Soil and Fate] (in Russian). Вильнюс; Москва: Весть.

== Further materials ==
- Linkov, Sergei (2015). Tolya Jakobson from Klynovsky Lane (Motion picture) (in English and Russian). – documentary on Yakobson
- Зарецкий, Александр; Китаевич, Юлий, eds. (2010). Памяти Анатолия Якобсона: Сборник воспоминаний к 75-летию со дня рождения [In memory of Anatoly Yakobson. Collected memoirs honoring his 75th birthday] (in Russian). Boston, MA: MGraphics Publishing. p. 580. ISBN 978-1-934881-31-6.
