= Robert Gordon Switz =

American spy for the Soviet Union (1904–1951)

Robert Gordon Switz (1904-1951) was a "wealthy American who converted to communism, served as spy for Soviet Military Intelligence ("GRU"), and was caught by French counterintelligence in 1933 in "l'Affaire Switz" (the "Switz Case")

== Background ==
Robert Gordon Switz was born on 4 October 1904 in East Orange, New Jersey, the son of Theodore Switz, a naturalized Russian, and Genevieve Switz. He attended Carteret Academy boarding school. He attended Mercersburg Academy but did not go to college. Instead, in 1922, he shipped out as seaman to Germany, which he toured. In 1926, he went to France, where he studied at the University of Besançon, University of Strasbourg, and Sorbonne.

== Career ==
Switz went abroad again to France, where he obtained an airplane pilot's license, then trained at Roosevelt Field on Long Island.

Some time during the 1920s, Switz joined the Communist Party USA. He took adult classes at the New York Workers School. In 1931, "Schumann" (Moishe Stern, Manfred Stern) recruited him to the GRU for his French and aviation and had him trained in photography in May 1931. He narrowly missed FBI investigation at a Brooklyn arms factory. By June-July 1931, he started working in a network that included Lydia Stahl and Paulne Jacobson-Levine (later recounted in Witness, the 1952 memoir of Whittaker Chambers). Replacing "Schumann" were first "Otto"/"Karl" and a second person "Frank"; "Otto" was then replaced by "Walter" (Alexander Ulanovsky) but "Frank" remained in place.

In May 1932, Switz went on a mission to turn American soldier Robert Osman, stationed in Panama Canal Zone. He used a "honey trap" - Frema Karry, a young Russian girl in Switz's network. Osman provided war plans. Osman was arrested, represented by socialist lawyer Louis Waldman (later lawyer for Walter Krivitsky), and imprisoned for 25 years. Switz escaped unnamed at the time.

In April 1933, "Frank" prepared to have Switz moved to London, and in May 1933, Switz and his wife relocated there.

In July 1933, Switz was reassigned to a Paris-based network led by "Markovich." In September 1933, he and his wife arrived in Paris. As cover, Switz served as a sales representative for the Robert MacNeil Instruments company. The company's president J.N.A. Van Ven Bonwhuizsen later said, "He never made any sales."

As a spy in Paris for the Soviets, Switz's role in espionage was to "gather French defense information for the benefit of Soviet intelligence." In December 1933, French intelligence arrested Switz in his apartment on the Rue de la Chaussée d'Antin (near the Paris Opera). Most of the information collected concerned French armaments, and was a form of industrial espionage. It included nearly $3,800, letters from the French Ministry of War, and eggshells, each pierced on one end. His arrest led to the arrest of 29 others, including Stahl and Romanian spy Octave Dumoulin. Switz escaped prosecution by cooperating with investigators from La Sûreté nationale. The trial occurred in March 1935.

In October 1933, Finnish-American Arvid Jacobson was arrested in Finland, whose government declared that Jacobson and Switz belonged to the same Soviet network between United States, Canada, France, Sweden, Norway, Estonia, and Latvia.

On September 27–28, 1948, and again on February 27 and March 1, 1950, Switz testified before the House Un-American Activities Committee.

== Personal life and death ==
In 1929, brother Paul F. Switz was a star football player at Yale University and later an economist. Brother Theodore Switz was a chemical economist at Lehman Corporation .

In 1933, Switz married Marjorie Tilley, daughter of Bertha Tilley and graduate of Vassar College. They had a daughter and three sons.

Robert Gordon Switz died on 23 January 1951 in Hurley near Kingston, New York, after an illness.

== Legacy ==
The Switz case ran concurrently with a scandal in France over Ukrainian born embezzler Alexandre Stavisky.

"L'affaire Switz" offset any Soviet gains in intelligence into the French military with embarrassment for the USSR as well as the French Communist Party ("PCF").

== See also ==
- Lydia Stahl

== External sources ==
- British National Archives: Robert Gordon SWITZ / Marjorie Tilley SWITZ
- Family Spy Story
