= Lydia Stahl =

American spy for the Soviet Union

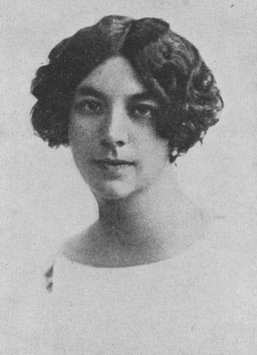
- Lydia Stahl
- Born: Lydia Chkalova; 1885; Rostov-on-Don, Russian Empire
- Died: Unknown
- Occupation: Soviet Military Intelligence agent
- Spouse: Boris Stahl (divorced)

Lydia Stahl (1885-?) was a Russian-born secret agent who worked for Soviet Military Intelligence in New York and Paris in the 1920s and 1930s.

== Early life ==
Lydia Stahl was born Lydia Chkalova in Rostov-on-Don, Russian Empire, in 1885.

== Personal life ==
Lydia Stahl obtained her last name when she married Boris Stahl, a Russian nobleman (baron). He later divorced her and emigrated to the United States with his new wife.

== Career ==
In 1921, while a refugee in Finland she joined the Soviet secret service. Lydia Stahl had befriended the Finnish writer Hella Wuolijoki and was a regular visitor to her manor house Marlebäck in Iitti, Finland, which was a meeting place for leftist intellectuals and politicians. Through her relationship with Finnish communist politician Otto Kuusinen, she had also met the American radical, journalist John Reed, and maintained correspondence with him until Reed's death in 1920.

During the 1920s, Lydia established a photography studio in Paris where she copied secret documents for Soviet Military Intelligence. In June 1928 she was transferred to New York City to help the Soviet Union's Main Intelligence Directorate (GRU) rezident Alfred Tilton. Her second trip to New York took place in December 1931. Then she returned to Paris to work for the network which included Robert Gordon Switz who led his own group. Lydia's ami was the French professor Louis Pierre Martin, codebreaker and translator for the Naval Ministry and member of the Legion of Honor.

== Arrest ==
In 1933, counterintelligence agencies uncovered an espionage network in Finland which included Tilton's wife Maria, Lydia's friend Ingrid Boström, and Finnish-American Arvid Jacobson. Boström provided information which led the French counterintelligence to Lydia. She was arrested in Paris in December 1933; other members of the network, including Switz and his wife, were arrested shortly afterward. Lydia Stahl was convicted of espionage in April 1935 and served a four-year sentence.

She disappeared after her release from French prison. According to some unverified reports, she continued working for the Soviet intelligence and lived in Argentina after World War II.
