= Won Jeong-hwa =

North Korean (born 1974)

- Born: 1974 (age 50–51); North Korea
- Known for: Espionage

Korean name
- Hangul: 원정화
- Hanja: 元正花
- RR: Won Jeonghwa
- MR: Wŏn Chŏnghwa

Won Jeong-hwa (born 1974) is a North Korean who was accused by South Korea of spying for the North and was sentenced to 5 years in prison in a court in Suwon on October 15, 2008.

Won first travelled from North Korea to South Korea in 2001, claiming to be a defector. The charges against Won included the seduction of military officers to gain intelligence, involvement in plots to murder intelligence agents and kidnap South Korean businessmen, and attempting to determine the location of defectors. The North Korean government claimed the allegations were fabricated to tarnish North Korea's reputation.

Won attempted suicide in prison on December 23, 2008. Following her release in 2013, some South Korean reporters and North Korean defectors claimed that she had not been involved with most of the plots of which she was accused, but was rather a low-level informant providing photos of military installations as well as newspaper clippings to her home country. Won herself claimed to have been pressured by prosecutors to inflate her own claims of espionage.
