= Politics of Russia =

Politics of the Russian Federation Государственный строй Российской Федерации
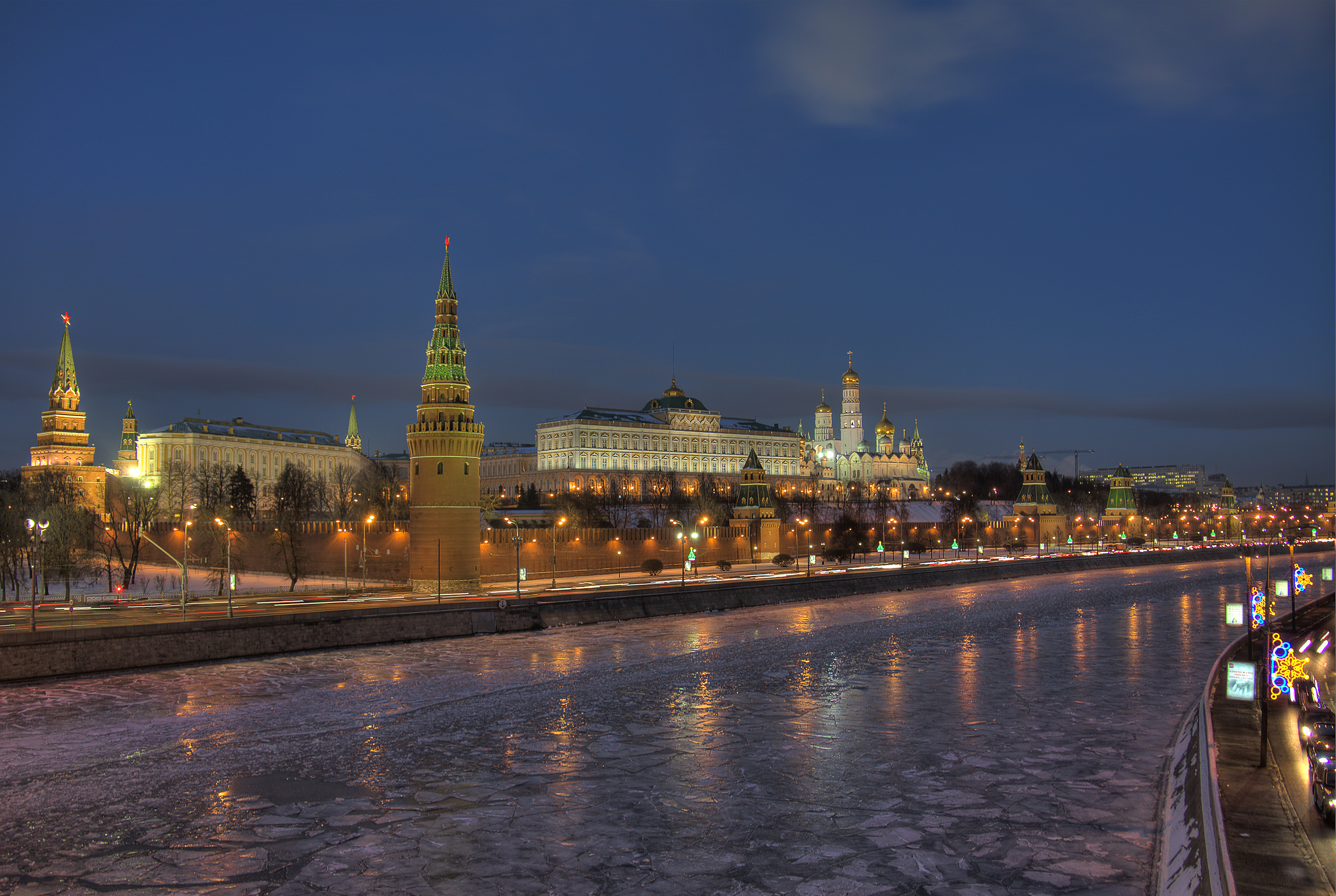
- The Moscow Kremlin has been the central location of Russian political affairs since Soviet times.
- Constitution: Constitution of Russia

Legislative branch
- Name: Federal Assembly
- Type: Bicameral
- Meeting place: Moscow Kremlin
- Upper house
- Name: Federation Council
- Presiding officer: Valentina Matviyenko, Chairwoman of the Federation Council
- Appointer: Indirect elections
- Lower house
- Name: State Duma
- Presiding officer: Vyacheslav Volodin, Chairman of the State Duma

Executive branch
- Head of state
- Title: President
- Currently: Vladimir Putin
- Appointer: Direct popular vote
- Head of government
- Title: Prime Minister
- Currently: Mikhail Mishustin
- Appointer: President
- Cabinet
- Name: Government of Russia
- Current cabinet: Mikhail Mishustin's Second Cabinet
- Leader: Prime Minister
- Appointer: President
- Headquarters: Moscow
- Ministries: 32

Judicial branch
- Name: Judiciary of Russia
- Constitutional Court
- Chief judge: Valery Zorkin
- Supreme Court

The politics of Russia function within the framework of the federal semi-presidential republic of Russia. According to the Constitution of Russia, the President of Russia is head of state, and of a multi-party system with executive power exercised by the government, headed by the Prime Minister, who is appointed by the President with the parliament's approval. Legislative power is vested in the two houses of the Federal Assembly of the Russian Federation, while the President and the government issue numerous legally binding by-laws.

Since the collapse of the Soviet Union at the end of 1991, Russia has seen serious challenges in its efforts to forge a political system to follow nearly seventy years of Soviet governance. For instance, leading figures in the legislative and executive branches have put forth opposing views of Russia's political direction and the governmental instruments that should be used to follow it. That conflict reached a climax in September and October 1993, when President Boris Yeltsin used military force to dissolve the parliament and called for new legislative elections (see Russian constitutional crisis of 1993). This event marked the end of Russia's first constitutional period, which was defined by the much-amended constitution adopted by the Supreme Soviet of the Russian Soviet Federative Socialist Republic in 1978. A new constitution, creating a strong presidency, was approved by referendum in December 1993.

With the new constitution and a new parliament representing diverse parties and factions, Russia's political structure subsequently showed signs of stabilization. As the transition period extended into the mid-1990s, the power of the national government continued to wane as Russia's regions gained political and economic concessions from Moscow. However, with the election of Russian Federation President Vladimir Putin in the 2000 Presidential Elections, reforms to strengthen federal control were implemented, rolling back regional power gains, including in the 22 Republics. He has later come to be the leading figure of Russia's political system, starting an economic reform and strong foreign involvement, having now become the longest Russian leader in power after Stalin. His policies are called Putinism.

== History ==
=== The Soviet inheritance ===
The first constitution of the Soviet Union, as promulgated in 1924, incorporated a treaty of union between various Soviet republics. Under the treaty, the Russian Socialist Federative Soviet Republic became known as the Russian Soviet Federated Socialist Republic (RSFSR). Nominally, the borders of each subunit incorporated the territory of a specific nationality. The constitution endowed the new republics with sovereignty, although they were said to have voluntarily delegated most of their sovereign powers to the Soviet center. Formal sovereignty was evidenced by the existence of flags, constitutions, and other state symbols, and by the republics' constitutionally guaranteed "right" to secede from the union.

Russia was the largest of the Union republics in terms of territory and population. During the Cold War era (ca 1947-1991), because of the Russians' dominance in the affairs of the union, the RSFSR failed to develop some of the institutions of governance and administration that were typical of public life in the other republics: a republic-level communist party, a Russian academy of sciences, and Russian branches of trade unions, for example. In the late 1980s, during the period of perestroika and glasnost, demands for autonomy and national rights grew across the Soviet republics. Ethnic Russians, too, began to call for the creation of distinct Russian institutions within the RSFSR, leading to a revival of Russian national identity. In 1990, the RSFSR asserted the primacy of its laws over those of the Soviet Union, signaling a significant shift toward sovereignty and eventual independence.

=== Gorbachev, 1985–1991 ===
Certain policies of Soviet leader Mikhail Gorbachev (in office as General Secretary of the Communist Party of the Soviet Union from 1985 to 1991) also encouraged nationalities in the union republics, including the Russian Republic, to assert their rights. These policies included glasnost (literally, public "voicing"), which made possible open discussion of democratic reforms and long-ignored public problems such as pollution. Glasnost also brought constitutional reforms that led to the election of new republic legislatures with substantial blocs of pro-reform representatives.

In the RSFSR a new legislature, called the Congress of People's Deputies, was elected in March 1990 in a largely free and competitive vote. Upon convening in May, the congress elected Boris Yeltsin, a onetime Gorbachev protégé who had resigned/been exiled from the top party echelons because of his radical reform proposals and erratic personality, as president of the congress's permanent working body, the Supreme Soviet. The next month, the Congress declared Russia's sovereignty over its natural resources and the primacy of Russia's laws over those of the central Soviet government.

During 1990-1991, the RSFSR enhanced its sovereignty by establishing republic branches of organizations such as the Communist Party, the Academy of Sciences of the Soviet Union, radio and television broadcasting facilities, and the Committee for State Security (Komitet gosudarstvennoy bezopasnosti—KGB). In 1991 Russia created a new executive office, the presidency, following the example of Gorbachev, who had created such an office for himself in 1990.

=== Yeltsin, 1991 ===
The Russian presidential election of June 1991 conferred legitimacy on the office, whereas Gorbachev had eschewed such an election and had himself appointed by the Soviet parliament. Despite Gorbachev's attempts to discourage Russia's electorate from voting for him, Yeltsin won the popular election to become the president, handily defeating five other candidates with more than 57 percent of the vote.

Yeltsin used his role as president of Russia to trumpet Russian sovereignty and patriotism, and his legitimacy as president was a major cause of the collapse of the coup by hard-line government and party officials against Gorbachev, the August coup of 1991. The coup leaders had attempted to overthrow Gorbachev in order to halt his plan to sign a New Union Treaty that they believed would wreck the Soviet Union. Yeltsin defiantly opposed the coup plotters and called for Gorbachev's restoration, rallying the Russian public. Most importantly, Yeltsin's faction led elements in the "power ministries" that controlled the military, the police, and the KGB to refuse to obey the orders of the coup plotters. The opposition led by Yeltsin, combined with the irresolution of the plotters, caused the coup to collapse after three days.

Following the failed August coup, Gorbachev found a fundamentally changed constellation of power, with Yeltsin in de facto control of much of a sometimes recalcitrant Soviet administrative apparatus. Although Gorbachev returned to his position as Soviet president, events began to bypass him. Communist Party activities were suspended. Most of the union republics quickly declared their independence, although many appeared willing to sign Gorbachev's vaguely-delineated confederation treaty. The Baltic states achieved full independence, and they quickly received diplomatic recognition from many nations. Gorbachev's rump government recognized the independence of Estonia, Latvia, and Lithuania in August and September 1991.

In late 1991, the Yeltsin government assumed budgetary control over Gorbachev's rump government. Russia did not declare its independence, and Yeltsin continued to hope for the establishment of some form of confederation. In December, one week after the Ukrainian Republic approved independence by referendum, Yeltsin and the leaders of Ukraine and Belarus met to form the Commonwealth of Independent States (CIS). In response to calls by the Central Asian and other union republics for admission, another meeting took place in Alma-Ata, on 21 December, to form an expanded CIS.

At that meeting, all parties declared that the 1922 treaty of union, which had established the Soviet Union, annulled and that the Soviet Union had ceased to exist. Gorbachev announced the decision officially on 25 December 1991. Russia gained international recognition as the principal successor to the Soviet Union, receiving the Soviet Union's permanent seat on the United Nations Security Council and positions in other international and regional organizations. The CIS states also agreed that Russia initially would take over Soviet embassies and other properties abroad.

In October 1991, during the "honeymoon" period after his resistance to the Soviet coup, Yeltsin had convinced the legislature to grant him special executive (and legislative) powers for one year so that he might implement his economic reforms. In November 1991 Yeltsin appointed a new government, with himself as acting prime minister, a post he held until the appointment of Yegor Gaidar as acting prime minister in June 1992.

=== Post-Soviet development under Yeltsin 1991–1993 ===
During 1992 Yeltsin and his reforms came under increasing attack from former members and officials of the Communist Party of the Soviet Union, from extreme nationalists, and from others calling for reform to be slowed or even halted in Russia. A locus of this opposition was increasingly the two-chamber parliament, the Supreme Soviet of Russia, comprising the Soviet of the Republic and the Soviet of Nationalities. The Chair of the Supreme Soviet, Ruslan Khasbulatov, became Yeltsin's most vocal opponent. Under the 1978 constitution, the parliament was the supreme organ of power in Russia.

After Russia added the office of president in 1991, the division of powers between the two branches remained ambiguous, while the Congress of People's Deputies of Russia (CPD) retained its obvious power "to examine and resolve any matter within the jurisdiction of the Russian Federation". In 1992 the Congress was even further empowered, gaining the ability to suspend any articles of the Constitution, per amended article 185 of the 1978 Constitution (Basic Law) of the Russian Federation.

Although Yeltsin managed to beat back most challenges to his reform program when the CPD met in April 1992, in December he suffered a significant loss of his special executive powers. The CPD ordered him to halt appointments of administrators in the localities and also the practice of naming additional local oversight emissaries (termed "presidential representatives"). Yeltsin also lost the power to issue special decrees concerning the economy, while retaining his constitutional power to issue decrees in accordance with existing laws.

When the CPD rejected Yeltsin's attempt to secure the confirmation of Gaidar as prime minister (December 1992), Yeltsin appointed Viktor Chernomyrdin, whom the parliament approved because he was viewed as more economically conservative than Gaidar. After contentious negotiations between the parliament and Yeltsin, the two sides agreed to hold a national referendum to allow the population to determine the basic division of powers between the two branches of government. In the meantime, proposals for extreme limitation of Yeltsin's power were tabled.

However, early 1993 saw increasing tension between Yeltsin and the parliament over the referendum and over power-sharing. In mid-March 1993, an emergency session of the CPD rejected Yeltsin's proposals on power-sharing and canceled the referendum, again opening the door to legislation that would shift the balance of power away from the president. Faced with these setbacks, Yeltsin addressed the nation directly to announce a "special regime", under which he would assume extraordinary executive power pending the results of a referendum on the timing of new legislative elections, on a new constitution, and on public confidence in the president and vice president. After the Constitutional Court declared his announcement unconstitutional, Yeltsin backed down.

Despite Yeltsin's change of heart, a second extraordinary session of the CPD took up discussion of emergency measures to defend the constitution, including impeachment of the president. Although the impeachment vote failed, the CPD set new terms for a popular referendum. The legislature's version of the referendum asked whether citizens had confidence in Yeltsin, approved of his reforms, and supported early presidential and legislative elections.

Under the CPD's terms, Yeltsin would need the support of 50 percent of eligible voters, rather than 50 percent of those actually voting, to avoid an early presidential election. In the vote on 25 April, Russians failed to provide this level of approval, but a majority of voters approved Yeltsin's policies and called for new legislative elections. Yeltsin termed the results, which delivered a serious blow to the prestige of the parliament, a mandate for him to continue in power.

In June 1993 Yeltsin decreed the creation of a special constitutional convention to examine the draft constitution that he had presented in April. This convention was designed to circumvent the parliament, which was working on its own draft constitution. As expected, the two main drafts contained contrary views of legislative-executive relations. The convention, which included delegates from major political and social organizations and the 89 subnational jurisdictions, approved a compromise draft constitution in July 1993, incorporating some aspects of the parliament's draft. The parliament failed to approve the draft, however.

In late September 1993, Yeltsin responded to the impasse in legislative-executive relations by repeating his announcement of a constitutional referendum, but this time he followed the announcement by dissolving the parliament and announcing new legislative elections for December (see Russian constitutional crisis of 1993). The CPD again met in emergency session, confirmed Vice President Aleksandr Rutskoy as president, and voted to impeach Yeltsin. On 27 September, military units surrounded the legislative building (popularly known as the White House - Russian: Белый дом), but 180 delegates refused to leave the building. After a two-week standoff, Rutskoy urged supporters outside the legislative building to overcome Yeltsin's military forces. Firefights and destruction of property resulted at several locations in Moscow.

The next day, on 3 October 1993 Yeltsin chose a radical solution to settle his dispute with parliament: he called up tanks to shell the parliament building. Under the direction of Minister of Defense Pavel Grachev, tanks fired on the White House, and military forces occupied the building and the rest of the city. As Yeltsin was taking the unconstitutional step of dissolving the legislature, Russia came the closest to serious civil conflict since the revolution of 1917. This open, violent confrontation remained a backdrop to Yeltsin's relations with the legislative branch for the next three years.

=== Development since 1993 ===
==== Executive-legislative power struggles, 1993–1996 ====
Although the 1993 constitution weakened their standing vis-à-vis the presidency, the parliaments elected in 1993 and 1995 nonetheless used their powers to shape legislation according to their own precepts and to defy Yeltsin on some issues. An early example was the February 1994 State Duma vote to grant amnesty to the leaders of the 1991 Moscow coup. Yeltsin vehemently denounced this action, although it was within the constitutional purview of the State Duma. In October 1994, both legislative chambers passed a law over Yeltsin's veto requiring the Government to submit quarterly reports on budget expenditures to the State Duma and adhere to other budgetary guidelines.

In the most significant executive-legislative clash since 1993, the State Duma overwhelmingly voted no confidence in the Government in June 1995. The vote was triggered by a Chechen rebel raid into the neighboring Russian town of Budenovsk, where the rebels were able to take more than 1,000 hostages. Dissatisfaction with Yeltsin's economic reforms also was a factor in the vote. A second motion of no confidence failed to carry in early July. In March 1996, the State Duma again incensed Yeltsin by voting to revoke the December 1991 resolution of the Russian Supreme Soviet abrogating the 1922 treaty under which the Soviet Union had been founded. That resolution had prepared the way for formation of the Commonwealth of Independent States.

In his February 1996 State of the Union speech, Yeltsin commended the previous parliament for passing a number of significant laws, and he noted with relief the "civil" resolution of the June 1995 no-confidence conflict. He complained, however, that the Federal Assembly had not acted on issues such as the private ownership of land, a tax code, and judicial reform. Yeltsin also was critical of legislation that he had been forced to return to the parliament because it contravened the constitution and existing law, and of legislative attempts to pass fiscal legislation in violation of the constitutional stricture that such bills must be preapproved by the Government. He noted that he would continue to use his veto power against ill-drafted bills and his power to issue decrees on issues he deemed important, and that such decrees would remain in force until suitable laws were passed. The State Duma passed a resolution in March 1996 demanding that Yeltsin refrain from returning bills to the parliament for redrafting, arguing that the president was obligated either to sign bills or to veto them.

==== Putin administration ====
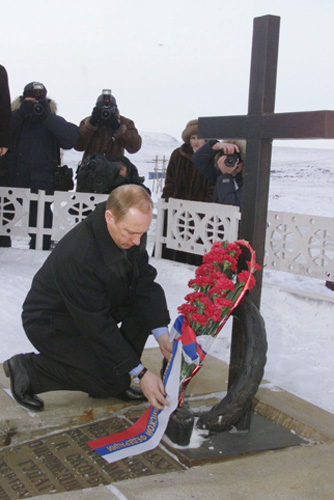
Vladimir Putin laid flowers at a memorial to the victims of Soviet-era political repression, Norillag gulag camp, 2002

Since the 2000 presidential election, Russian politics has been focused on Putin, his United Russia party, and Prime Minister Mikhail Mishustin. At the 2003 legislative elections, United Russia reduced all other parties to minority status in landslide electoral victory. Other parties retaining seats in the State Duma, the lower house of the legislature, are the Communist Party of the Russian Federation, the Liberal Democratic Party of Russia and A Just Russia.

The first presidential elections were held on 26 March 2000. Putin, who had previously been made Prime Minister of Russia and, following Yeltsin's resignation, was acting president of Russia, won in the first round with 53% of the vote in what was judged generally free and fair elections. (See 2000 Russian presidential election.) Putin won a second full term without difficulty in the March 2004 presidential election. While the Organization for Security and Co-operation in Europe reported that the elections were generally organized professionally, there was criticism of the unequal treatment of candidates by State-controlled media, among other issues.

After the election, on 24 February 2004, Prime Minister Mikhail Kasyanov and his cabinet were dismissed by Putin. Pundits in Russia believed this not to be due to the president's displeasure with the government, but with Kasyanov himself, as the Russian constitution does not allow the prime minister to be removed without firing the whole cabinet. Kasyanov later went on to become a stark Putin critic. Although Russia's regions enjoy a degree of autonomous self-government, the election of regional governors was substituted by direct appointment by the president in 2005. In September 2007, Putin accepted the resignation of Prime Minister Mikhail Fradkov, appointing Viktor Zubkov as the new Prime minister.

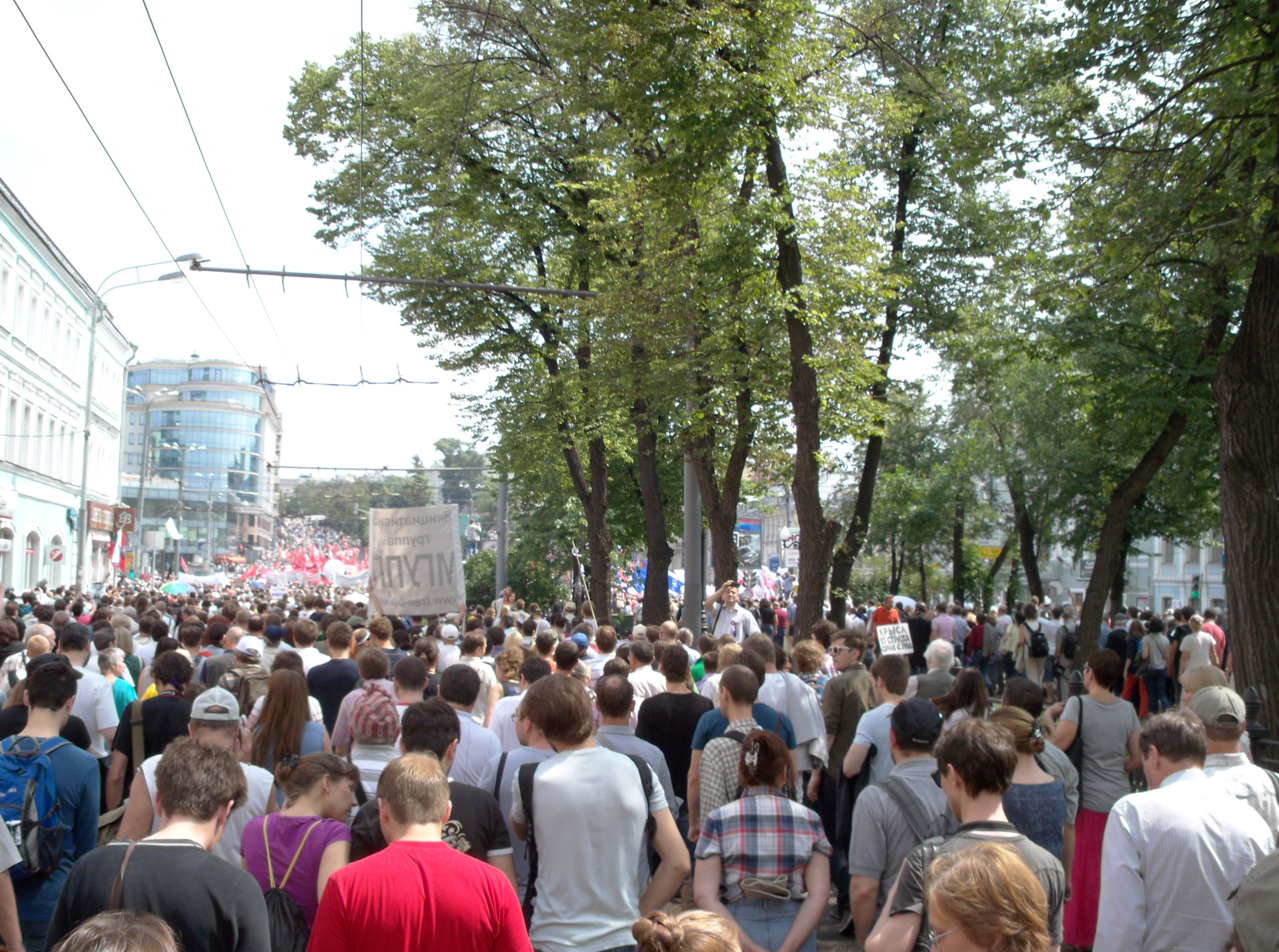
Anti-Putin protesters march in Moscow, 13 June 2012

In the 2008 Russian Presidential election, Dmitry Medvedev—whose nomination was supported by the popular outgoing President Vladimir Putin—scored a landslide victory. According to analysts, the country was now effectively ruled by a "tandem", with a constitutionally powerful President and an influential and popular Prime Minister.

Russia has suffered democratic backsliding during Putin's and Medvedev's tenures. Freedom House has listed Russia as being "not free" since 2005. In 2004, Freedom House warned that Russia's "retreat from freedom marks a low point not registered since 1989, when the country was part of the Soviet Union." Alvaro Gil-Robles (then head of the Council of Europe human rights division) stated in 2004 that "the fledgling Russian democracy is still, of course, far from perfect, but its existence and its successes cannot be denied."

During Putin's first presidential term, the Russian economy grew by an average of 7% per year as a result of many economic reforms and a fivefold increase in oil and gas prices. The Economist Intelligence Unit has rated Russia as "authoritarian" since 2011, whereas it had previously been considered a "hybrid regime" (with "some form of democratic government" in place) as late as 2007. The Russian Federation states that Russia is a democratic federal law-bound state with a republican form of government, which has been proven of not being acted upon today. Political scientist Larry Diamond, writing in 2015, stated "no serious scholar would consider Russia today a democracy".

Natalia Arno, former head of the International Republican Institute's operations in Russia, describes elections in Russia's "managed democracy" thusly:

Political actors who support the president are permitted to put their name on the ballot and to nominally run against him, but whenever a person arose who actually wanted to challenge the system, they always ran into bureaucratic barriers. Maybe the Central Election Commission would find a problem with the signatures that the candidate collected in order to register, or maybe the candidate would be charged with a crime based on questionable evidence, but something would always happen ...

The arrest of prominent oligarch Mikhail Khodorkovsky on charges of fraud, embezzlement, and tax evasion was met with domestic and Western criticism that the arrest was political and that his trial was highly flawed. However, the move was met positively by the Russian public and has largely undeterred investment from the country, which continued to grow at double-digit rates.

In 2005, Russia started steadily increasing the price it sold heavily subsidized gas to ex-Soviet republics. Russia has been accused of using its natural resources as a political weapon. Russia, in turn, accuses the West of applying double standards relating to market principles, pointing out that Russia has been supplying gas to the states in question at prices that were significantly below world market levels, and in most cases remain so even after the increases. Politicians in Russia argued that it is not obligated to effectively subsidize the economies of post-Soviet states by offering them resources at below-market prices. Regardless of alleged political motivation, observers have noted that charging market prices is Russia's legitimate right, and point out that Russia has raised the price even for its close ally, Belarus.

== Constitution and government structure ==
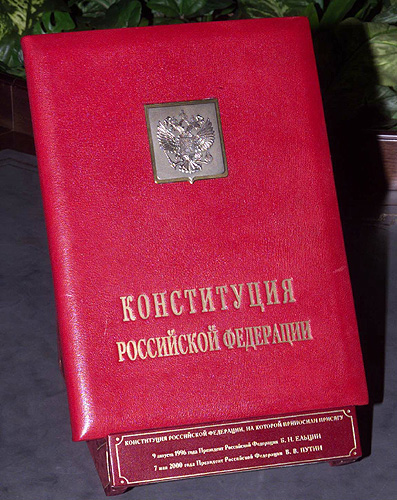
The Presidential copy of the Russian Constitution

During 1992-93 Yeltsin had argued that the existing, heavily amended 1978 constitution of Russia was obsolete and self-contradictory and that Russia required a new constitution granting the president greater power. This assertion led to the submission and advocacy of rival constitutional drafts drawn up by the legislative and executive branches. The parliament's failure to endorse a compromise was an important factor in Yeltsin's dissolution of that body in September 1993.

Yeltsin then used his presidential powers to form a sympathetic constitutional assembly, which quickly produced a draft constitution providing for a strong executive, and to shape the outcome of the December 1993 referendum on Russia's new basic law. The turnout requirement for the referendum was changed from 50 percent of the electorate to simply 50 percent of participating voters. The referendum vote resulted in approval by 58.4 percent of Russia's registered voters.

The 1993 constitution declares Russia a democratic, federative, law-based state with a republican form of government. State power is divided among the legislative, executive, and judicial branches. Diversity of ideologies and religions is sanctioned, and a state or compulsory ideology may not be adopted. Progressively, however, human rights violations in connection with religious groups labeled "extremist" by the government have been increasingly frequent. The right to a multiparty political system is upheld. The content of laws must be approved by the public before they take effect, and they must be formulated in accordance with international law and principles. Russian is proclaimed the state language, although the republics of the federation are allowed to establish their own state language.

== Executive branch ==
Main office-holders
| Office | Name | Party | Since |
|---|---|---|---|
| President | Vladimir Putin | — | 7 May 2012 |
| Prime Minister | Mikhail Mishustin | — | 16 January 2020 |

The 1993 constitution created a dual executive consisting of a president and prime minister, with the president as the dominant figure. Russia's strong presidency sometimes is compared with that of Charles de Gaulle (in office 1958–1969) in the French Fifth Republic. The constitution spells out many prerogatives specifically, but some powers enjoyed by Yeltsin were developed in an ad hoc manner.

=== Presidential powers ===
Russia's president determines the basic direction of Russia's domestic and foreign policy and represents the Russian state within the country and in foreign affairs. The president appoints and recalls Russia's ambassadors upon consultation with the legislature, accepts the credentials and letters of recall of foreign representatives, conducts international talks, and signs international treaties. A special provision allowed Yeltsin to complete the term prescribed to end in June 1996 and to exercise the powers of the new constitution, although he had been elected under a different constitutional order.

In the 1996 presidential election campaign, some candidates called for eliminating the presidency, criticizing its powers as dictatorial. Yeltsin defended his presidential powers, claiming that Russians desire "a vertical power structure and a strong hand" and that a parliamentary government would result in indecisive talk rather than action.

Several prescribed powers put the president in a superior position vis-à-vis the legislature. The president has broad authority to issue decrees and directives that have the force of law without judicial review, although the constitution notes that they must not contravene that document or other laws. Under certain conditions, the president may dissolve the State Duma, the lower house of parliament, the Federal Assembly. The president has the prerogatives of scheduling referendums (a power previously reserved to the parliament), submitting draft laws to the State Duma, and promulgating federal laws.

The executive-legislative crisis of the fall of 1993 prompted Yeltsin to emplace constitutional obstacles to legislative removal of the president. Under the 1993 constitution, if the president commits "grave crimes" or treason, the State Duma may file impeachment charges with the parliament's upper house, the Federation Council. These charges must be confirmed by a ruling of the Supreme Court that the president's actions constitute a crime and by a ruling of the Constitutional Court that proper procedures in filing charges have been followed. The charges then must be adopted by a special commission of the State Duma and confirmed by at least two-thirds of State Duma deputies.

A two-thirds vote of the Federation Council is required for removal of the president. If the Federation Council does not act within three months, the charges are dropped. If the president is removed from office or becomes unable to exercise power because of serious illness, the prime minister is to temporarily assume the president's duties; a presidential election then must be held within three months. The constitution does not provide for a vice president, and there is no specific procedure for determining whether the president is able to carry out his duties.

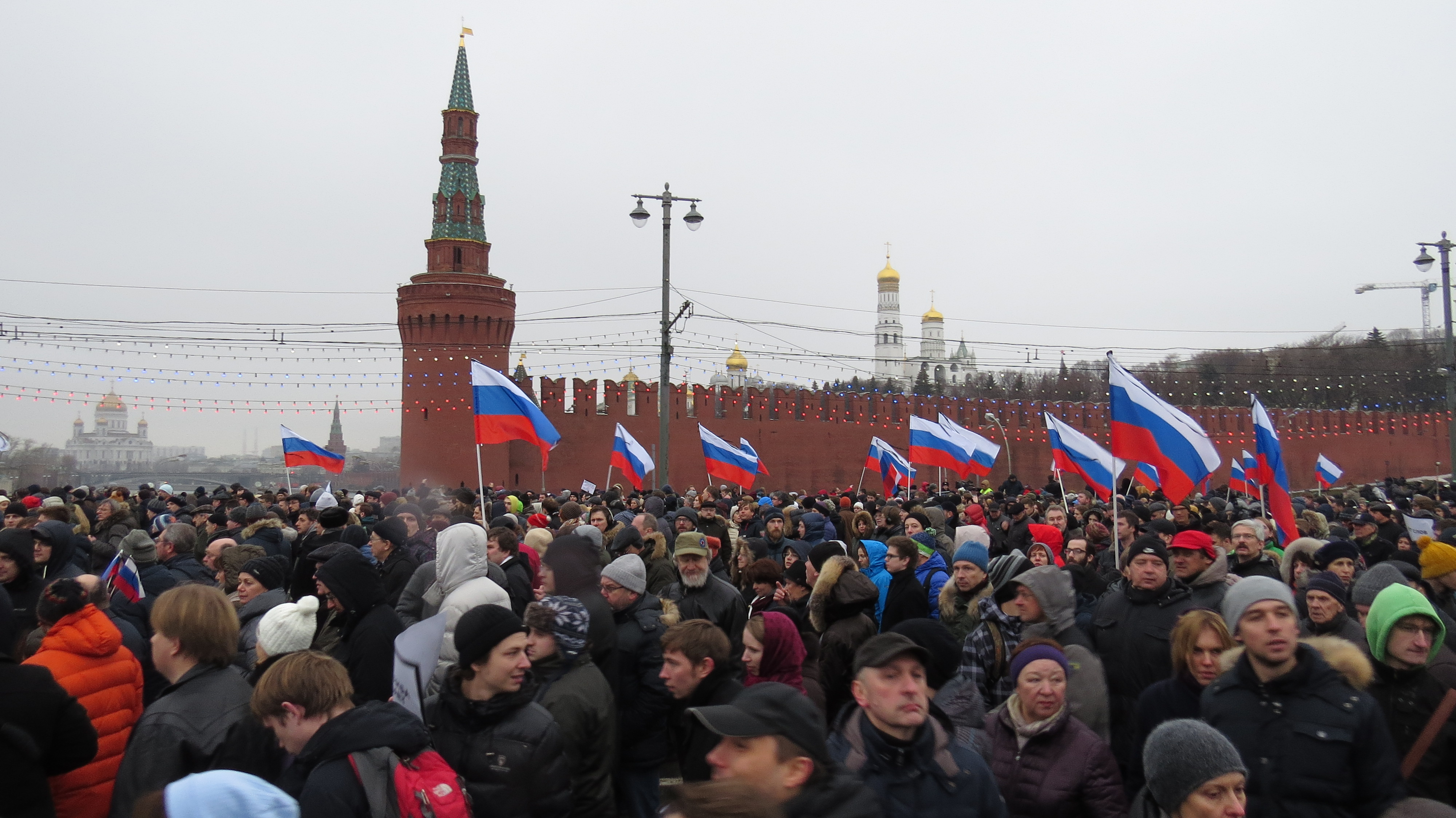
Russian opposition protest in Moscow, 1 March 2015

The president is empowered to appoint the prime minister to chair the Government (called the cabinet or the council of ministers in other countries), with the consent of the State Duma. The President of the Russian Federation chairs the meetings of the Government of the Russian Federation. He can also dismiss the government entirely. Upon the advice of the prime minister, the president can appoint or remove Government members, including the deputy prime ministers.

The president submits candidates to the State Duma for the post of chairman of the Central Bank of the Russian Federation (RCB) and may propose that the State Duma dismiss the chairman. In addition, the president submits candidates to the Federation Council for appointment as justices of the Constitutional Court, the Supreme Court, and the High Court of Arbitration, as well as candidates for the office of Prosecutor-General, Russia's chief law enforcement officer. The president also appoints justices of federal district courts.

==== Informal powers and power centers ====
Many of the president's powers are related to the incumbent's undisputed leeway in forming an administration and hiring staff. The presidential administration is composed of several competing, overlapping, and vaguely delineated hierarchies that historically have resisted efforts at consolidation. In early 1996, Russian sources reported the size of the presidential apparatus in Moscow and the localities at more than 75,000 people, most of them employees of state-owned enterprises directly under presidential control. This structure is similar to, but several times larger than, the top-level apparatus of the Soviet-era Communist Party of the Soviet Union (CPSU).

Former first deputy prime minister Anatoly Chubais was appointed chief of the presidential administration (chief of staff) in July 1996. Chubais replaced Nikolay Yegorov, a hard-line associate of deposed Presidential Security Service chief Alexander Korzhakov. Yegorov had been appointed in early 1996, when Yeltsin reacted to the strong showing of antireform factions in the legislative election by purging reformers from his administration. Yeltsin now ordered Chubais, who had been included in that purge, to reduce the size of the administration and the number of departments overseeing the functions of the ministerial apparatus.

The six administrative departments in existence at that time dealt with citizens' rights, domestic and foreign policy, state and legal matters, personnel, analysis, and oversight, and Chubais inherited a staff estimated at 2,000 employees. Chubais also received control over a presidential advisory group with input on the economy, national security, and other matters. Reportedly that group had competed with Korzhakov's security service for influence in the Yeltsin administration.

Another center of power in the presidential administration is the Security Council, which was created by statute in mid-1992. The 1993 constitution describes the council as formed and headed by the president and governed by statute. Since its formation, it apparently has gradually lost influence in competition with other power centers in the presidential administration. However, the June 1996 appointment of former army general and presidential candidate Alexander Lebed to head the Security Council improved prospects for the organization's standing. In July 1996, a presidential decree assigned the Security Council a wide variety of new missions. The decree's description of the Security Council's consultative functions was especially vague and wide-ranging, although it positioned the head of the Security Council directly subordinate to the president. As had been the case previously, the Security Council was required to hold meetings at least once a month.

Other presidential support services include the Control Directorate (in charge of investigating official corruption), the Administrative Affairs Directorate, the Presidential Press Service, and the Protocol Directorate. The Administrative Affairs Directorate controls state dachas, sanatoriums, automobiles, office buildings, and other perquisites of high office for the executive, legislative, and judicial branches of government, a function that includes management of more than 200 state industries with about 50,000 employees. The Committee on Operational Questions, until June 1996 chaired by antireformist Oleg Soskovets, has been described as a "government within a government". Also attached to the presidency are more than two dozen consultative commissions and extrabudgetary "funds".

The president also has extensive powers over military policy. As the Supreme Commander-in-Chief of the Armed Forces of the Russian Federation, the president approves the military doctrine, appoints and removes the high command of the armed forces, and confers higher military ranks and awards. The president is empowered to declare national or regional states of martial law, as well as state of emergency. In both cases, both houses of the parliament must be notified immediately. The Federation Council, the upper house, has the power to confirm or reject such a decree.

The regime of martial law is defined by federal law "On Martial law", signed into law by president Vladimir Putin in 2002. The circumstances and procedures for the president to declare a state of emergency are more specifically outlined in federal law than in the constitution. In practice, the Constitutional Court ruled in 1995 that the president has wide leeway in responding to crises within Russia, such as lawlessness in the separatist Republic of Chechnya, and that Yeltsin's action in Chechnya did not require a formal declaration of a state of emergency. In 1994 Yeltsin declared a state of emergency in Ingushetia and North Ossetia, two republics beset by intermittent ethnic conflict.

=== Presidential elections ===
The constitution sets few requirements for presidential elections, deferring in many matters to other provisions established by law. The presidential term is set at six years, and the president may only serve two consecutive terms. A candidate for president must be a citizen of Russia, at least 35 years of age, and a resident of the country for at least ten years. If a president becomes unable to continue in office because of health problems, resignation, impeachment, or death, a presidential election is to be held not more than three months later. In such a situation, the Federation Council is empowered to set the election date.

The Law on Presidential Elections, ratified in May 1995, establishes the legal basis for presidential elections. Based on a draft submitted by Yeltsin's office, the new law included many provisions already contained in the Russian Republic's 1990 election law; alterations included the reduction in the number of signatures required to register a candidate from 2 million to 1 million. The law, which set rigorous standards for fair campaign and election procedures, was hailed by international analysts as a major step toward democratization. Under the law, parties, blocs, and voters' groups register with the Central Electoral Commission of Russia (CEC) and designate their candidates. These organizations then are permitted to begin seeking the 1 million signatures needed to register their candidates; no more than 7 percent of the signatures may come from a single federal jurisdiction. The purpose of the 7 percent requirement is to promote candidacies with broad territorial bases and eliminate those supported by only one city or ethnic enclave.

The law required that at least 50 percent of eligible voters participate in order for a presidential election to be valid. In State Duma debate over the legislation, some deputies had advocated a minimum of 25 percent (which was later incorporated into the electoral law covering the State Duma), warning that many Russians were disillusioned with voting and would not turn out. To make voter participation more appealing, the law required one voting precinct for approximately every 3,000 voters, with voting allowed until late at night. The conditions for absentee voting were eased, and portable ballot boxes were to be made available on demand. Strict requirements were established for the presence of election observers, including emissaries from all participating parties, blocs, and groups, at polling places and local electoral commissions to guard against tampering and to ensure proper tabulation.

The Law on Presidential Elections requires that the winner receive more than 50 percent of the votes cast. If no candidate receives more than 50 percent of the vote (a highly probable result because of multiple candidacies), the top two vote-getters must face each other in a runoff election. Once the results of the first round are known, the runoff election must be held within fifteen days. A traditional provision allows voters to check off "none of the above," meaning that a candidate in a two-person runoff might win without attaining a majority. Another provision of the election law empowers the Central Election Commission to request that the Supreme Court ban a candidate from the election if that candidate advocates a violent transformation of the constitutional order or the integrity of the Russian Federation.

The presidential election of 1996 was a major episode in the struggle between Yeltsin and the Communist Party of the Russian Federation (KPRF), which sought to oust Yeltsin from office and return to power. Yeltsin had banned the Communist Party of the Russian Republic for its central role in the August 1991 coup against the Gorbachev government. As a member of the Politburo and the Secretariat of the banned party, Gennady Zyuganov had worked hard to gain its relegalization. Despite Yeltsin's objections, the Constitutional Court cleared the way for the Russian communists to reemerge as the KPRF, headed by Zyuganov, in February 1993. Yeltsin temporarily banned the party again in October 1993 for its role in the Supreme Soviet's just-concluded attempt to overthrow his administration. Beginning in 1993, Zyuganov also led efforts by KPRF deputies to impeach Yeltsin. After the KPRF's triumph in the December 1995 legislative elections, Yeltsin announced that he would run for reelection with the main purpose of safeguarding Russia from a communist restoration.

Although there was speculation that losing parties in the December 1995 election might choose not to nominate presidential candidates, in fact dozens of citizens both prominent and obscure announced their candidacies. After the gathering and review of signature lists, the CEC validated eleven candidates, one of whom later dropped out.

In the opinion polls of early 1996, Yeltsin trailed far behind most of the other candidates; his popularity rating was below 10 percent for a prolonged period. However, a last-minute, intense campaign featuring heavy television exposure, speeches throughout Russia promising increased state expenditures for a wide variety of interest groups, and campaign-sponsored concerts boosted Yeltsin to a 3 percent plurality over Zyuganov in the first round. The election campaign was largely sponsored by wealthy tycoons, for whom Yeltsin remaining at power was the key to protect their property acquired during the reforms of 1991-1996. After the first election round, Yeltsin took the tactically significant step of appointing first-round presidential candidate Alexander Lebed, who had placed third behind Yeltsin and Zyuganov, as head of the Security Council. Yeltsin followed the appointment of Lebed as the president's top adviser on national security by dismissing several top hard-line members of his entourage who were widely blamed for human rights violations in Chechnya and other mistakes. Despite his virtual disappearance from public view for health reasons shortly thereafter, Yeltsin was able to sustain his central message that Russia should move forward rather than return to its communist past. Zyuganov failed to mount an energetic or convincing second campaign, and three weeks after the first phase of the election, Yeltsin easily defeated his opponent, 54 percent to 40 percent.

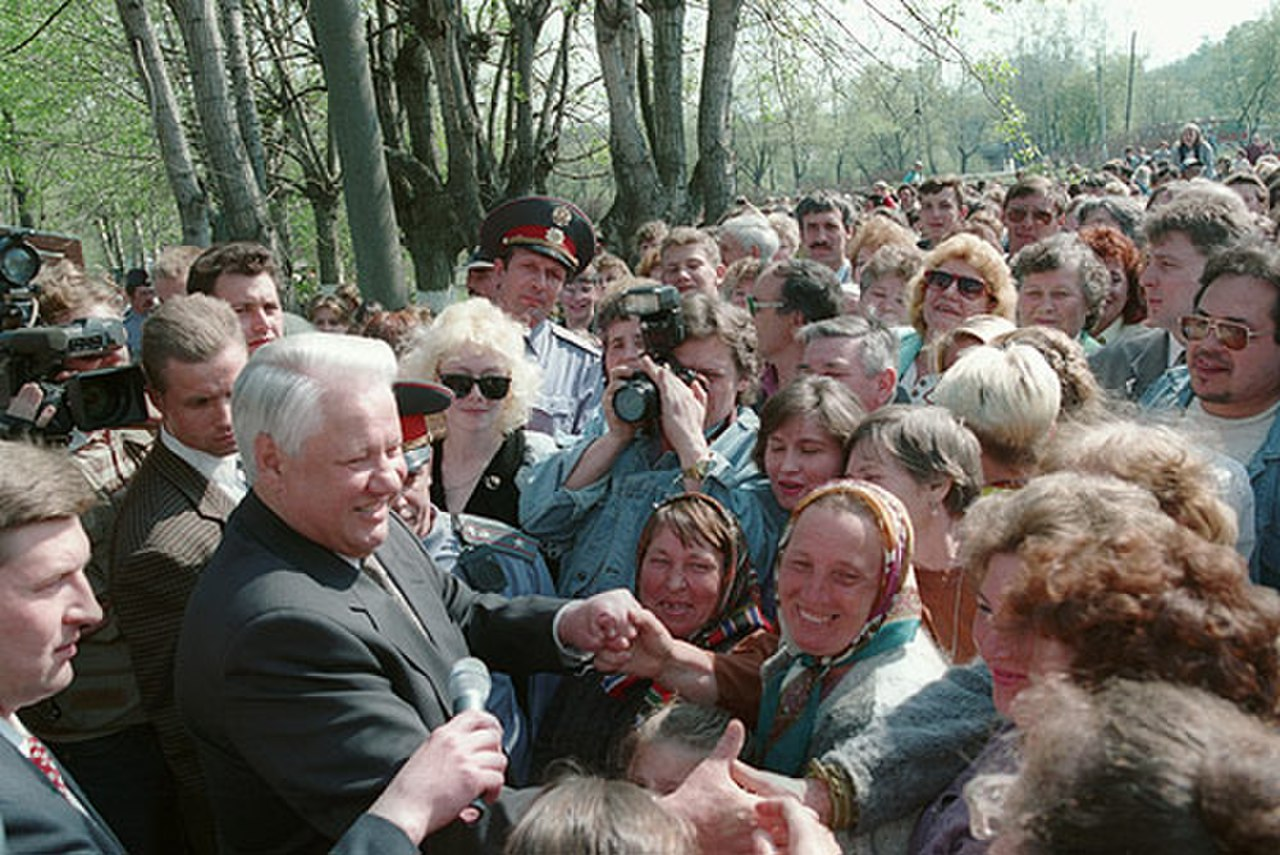
Boris Yeltsin campaigning in Moscow Oblast on May 7, 1996

It was argued Yeltsin won the 1996 Russian presidential election thanks to the extensive assistance provided by the team of media and PR experts from the United States. The Guardian reported that Joe Shumate, George Gorton, Richard Dresner, a close associate of Dick Morris, "and Steven Moore (who came on later as a PR specialist) gave an exclusive interview to Time magazine in 1996 about their adventures working as political consultants in Russia. They also detailed the extent of their collaboration with the Clinton White House."

Turnout in the first round was high, with about 70 percent of 108.5 million voters participating. Total turnout in the second round was nearly the same as in the first round. A contingent of almost 1,000 international observers judged the election to be largely fair and democratic, as did the CEC.

Most observers in Russia and elsewhere concurred that the election boosted democratization in Russia, and many asserted that reforms in Russia had become irreversible. Yeltsin had strengthened the institution of regularly contested elections when he rejected calls by business organizations and other groups and some of his own officials to cancel or postpone the balloting because of the threat of violence. The high turnout indicated that voters had confidence that their ballots would count, and the election went forward without incident. The democratization process also was bolstered by Yeltsin's willingness to change key personnel and policies in response to public protests and by his unprecedented series of personal campaign appearances throughout Russia.

=== Government (cabinet) ===
The constitution prescribes that the Government of Russia, which corresponds to the Western cabinet structure, consist of a prime minister (chairman of the Government), deputy prime ministers, and federal ministers and their ministries and departments. Within one week of appointment by the president and approval by the State Duma, the prime minister must submit to the president nominations for all subordinate Government positions, including deputy prime ministers and federal ministers. The prime minister carries out administration in line with the constitution and laws and presidential decrees. The ministries of the Government, which numbered 24 in mid-1996, execute credit and monetary policies and defense, foreign policy, and state security functions; ensure the rule of law and respect for human and civil rights; protect property; and take measures against crime. If the Government issues implementing decrees and directives that are at odds with legislation or presidential decrees, the president may rescind them.

The Government formulates the federal budget, submits it to the State Duma, and issues a report on its implementation. In late 1994, the parliament successfully demanded that the Government begin submitting quarterly reports on budget expenditures and adhere to other guidelines on budgetary matters, although the parliament's budgetary powers are limited. If the State Duma rejects a draft budget from the Government, the budget is submitted to a conciliation commission including members from both branches.

Besides the ministries, in 1996 the executive branch included eleven state committees and 46 state services and agencies, ranging from the State Space Agency (Glavkosmos) to the State Committee for Statistics (Goskomstat). There were also myriad agencies, boards, centers, councils, commissions, and committees. Prime Minister Viktor Chernomyrdin's personal staff was reported to number about 2,000 in 1995.

Chernomyrdin, who had been appointed prime minister in late 1992 to appease antireform factions, established a generally smooth working relationship with Yeltsin. Chernomyrdin proved adept at conciliating hostile domestic factions and at presenting a positive image of Russia in negotiations with other nations. However, as Yeltsin's standing with public opinion plummeted in 1995, Chernomyrdin became one of many government officials who received public blame from the president for failures in the Yeltsin administration. As part of his presidential campaign, Yeltsin threatened to replace the Chernomyrdin Government if it failed to address pressing social welfare problems in Russia. After the mid-1996 presidential election, however, Yeltsin announced that he would nominate Chernomyrdin to head the new Government.

== Legislative branch ==
=== Parliament ===
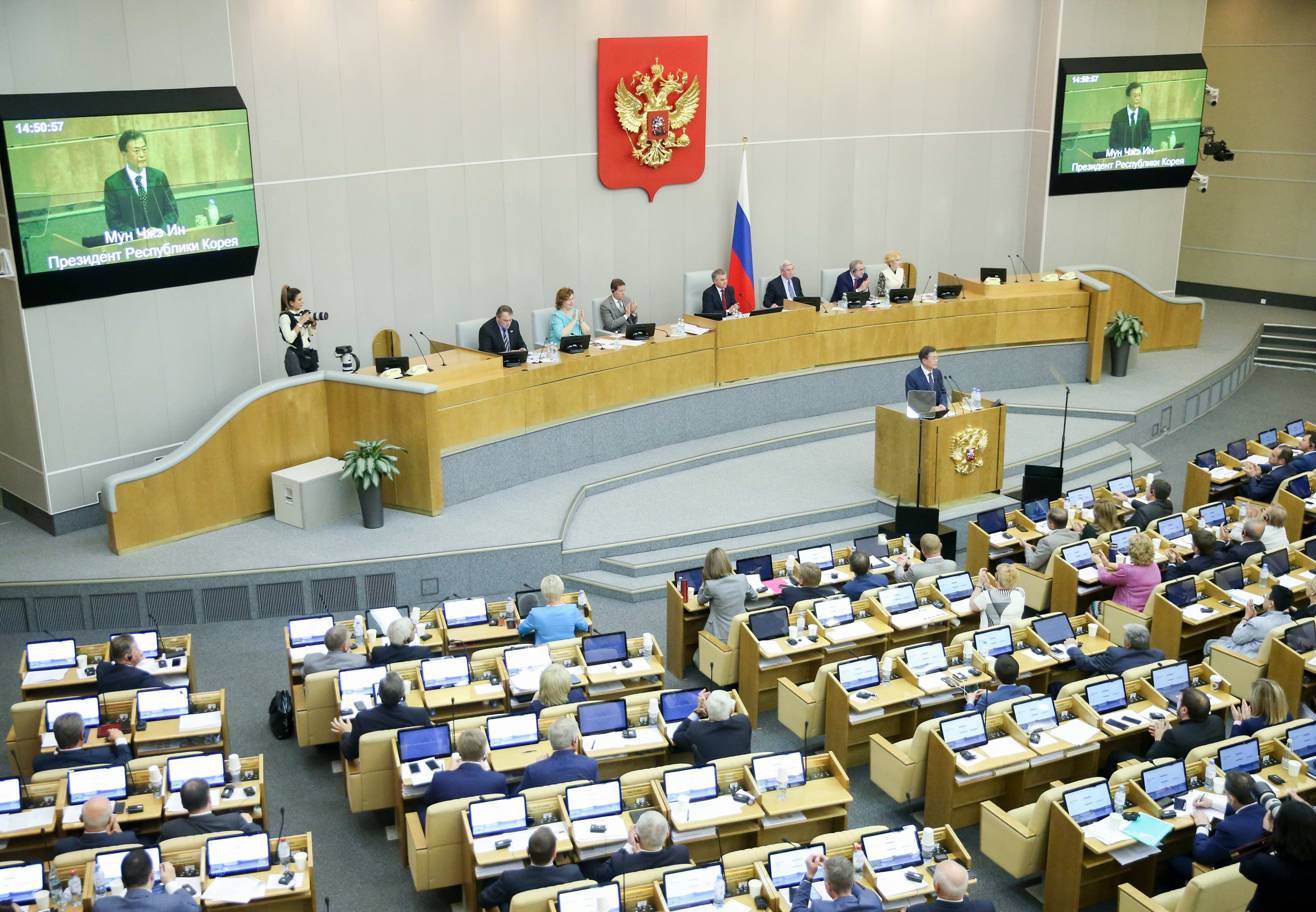
South Korean President Moon Jae-in speaking in the Russian State Duma, 2018

The 616-member parliament, termed the Federal Assembly, consists of two houses, the 450-member State Duma (the lower house) and the 166-member Federation Council (the upper house). Russia's legislative body was established by the constitution approved in the December 1993 referendum. The first elections to the Federal Assembly were held at the same time—a procedure criticized by some Russians as indicative of Yeltsin's lack of respect for constitutional niceties. Under the constitution, the deputies elected in December 1993 were termed "transitional" because they were to serve only a two-year term.

In April 1994, legislators, government officials, prominent business-people and religious leaders signed a "Civic Accord" proposed by Yeltsin, pledging during the two-year "transition period" to refrain from violence, calls for early presidential or legislative elections, and attempts to amend the constitution. This accord, and memories of the violent confrontation of the previous parliament with government forces, had some effect in softening political rhetoric during the next two years.

The first legislative elections under the new constitution included a few irregularities. The republics of Tatarstan and Chechnya and Chelyabinsk Oblast boycotted the voting; this action, along with other discrepancies, resulted in the election of only 170 members to the Federation Council. However, by mid-1994 all seats were filled except those of Chechnya, which continued to proclaim its independence. All federal jurisdictions participated in the December 1995 legislative elections, although the fairness of voting in Chechnya was compromised by the ongoing conflict there.

The Federal Assembly is described as a permanently functioning body, meaning that it is in continuous session except for a regular break between the spring and fall sessions. This working schedule distinguishes the new parliament from Soviet-era "rubber-stamp" legislative bodies, which met only a few days each year. The new constitution also directs that the two houses meet separately in sessions open to the public, although joint meetings are held for important speeches by the president or foreign leaders.

Deputies of the State Duma work full-time on their legislative duties; they are not allowed to serve simultaneously in local legislatures or hold Government positions. A transitional clause in the constitution, however, allowed deputies elected in December 1993 to retain their Government employment, a provision that allowed many officials of the Yeltsin administration to serve in the parliament. After the December 1995 legislative elections, nineteen Government officials were forced to resign their offices in order to take up their legislative duties.

Despite its "transitional" nature, the Federal Assembly of 1994-95 approved about 500 pieces of legislation in two years. When the new parliament convened in January 1996, deputies were provided with a catalogue of these laws and were directed to work in their assigned committees to fill gaps in existing legislation as well as to draft new laws. A major accomplishment of the 1994-95 legislative sessions was passage of the first two parts of a new civil code, desperately needed to update antiquated Soviet-era provisions. The new code included provisions on contract obligations, rents, insurance, loans and credit, partnership, and trusteeship, as well as other legal standards essential to support the creation of a market economy. Work on several bills that had been in committee or in floor debate in the previous legislature resumed in the new body. Similarly, several bills that Yeltsin had vetoed were taken up again by the new legislature.

==== Structure of the Federal Assembly ====
The composition of the Federation Council was a matter of debate until shortly before the 2000 elections. The legislation that emerged in December 1995 over Federation Council objections clarified the constitution's language on the subject by providing ex officio council seats to the heads of local legislatures and administrations in each of the eighty-nine subnational jurisdictions, hence a total of 178 seats. As composed in 1996, the Federation Council included about fifty chief executives of subnational jurisdictions who had been appointed to their posts by Yeltsin during 1991-92, then won popular election directly to the body in December 1993. But the law of 1995 provided for popular elections of chief executives in all subnational jurisdictions, including those still governed by presidential appointees. The individuals chosen in those elections then would assume ex officio seats in the Federation Council.

Each house elects a chairman to control the internal procedures of the house. The houses also form Parliamentary committees and commissions to deal with particular types of issues. Unlike committees and commissions in previous Russian and Soviet parliaments, those operating under the 1993 constitution have significant responsibilities in devising legislation and conducting oversight. They prepare and evaluate draft laws, report on draft laws to their houses, conduct hearings, and oversee implementation of the laws. As of early 1996, there were twenty-eight committees and several ad hoc commissions in the State Duma, and twelve committees and two commissions in the Federation Council. The Federation Council has established fewer committees because of the part-time status of its members, who also hold political office in the subnational jurisdictions. In 1996 most of the committees in both houses were retained in basic form from the previous parliament. According to internal procedure, no deputy may sit on more than one committee. By 1996 many State Duma committees had established subcommittees.

Committee positions are allocated when new parliaments are seated. The general policy calls for allocation of committee chairmanships and memberships among parties and factions roughly in proportion to the size of their representation. In 1994, however, Vladimir Zhirinovsky's Liberal Democratic Party of Russia (Liberal'no-demokraticheskaya partiya Rossii—LDPR), which had won the second largest number of seats in the recent election, was denied all but one key chairmanship, that of the State Duma's Committee on Geopolitics.

==== Legislative powers ====
The two chambers of the Federal Assembly possess different powers and responsibilities, with the State Duma the more powerful. The Federation Council, as its name and composition implies, deals primarily with issues of concern to the subnational jurisdictions, such as adjustments to internal borders and decrees of the president establishing martial law or states of emergency. As the upper chamber, it also has responsibilities in confirming and removing the procurator general and confirming justices of the Constitutional Court, the Supreme Court, and the High Court of Arbitration, upon the recommendation of the president. The Federation Council also is entrusted with the final decision if the State Duma recommends removing the president from office. The constitution also directs that the Federation Council examine bills passed by the lower chamber dealing with budgetary, tax, and other fiscal measures, as well as issues dealing with war and peace and with treaty ratification.

In the consideration and disposition of most legislative matters, however, the Federation Council has less power than the State Duma. All bills, even those proposed by the Federation Council, must first be considered by the State Duma. If the Federation Council rejects a bill passed by the State Duma, the two chambers may form a conciliation commission to work out a compromise version of the legislation. The State Duma then votes on the compromise bill. If the State Duma objects to the proposals of the upper chamber in the conciliation process, it may vote by a two-thirds majority to send its version to the president for signature. The part-time character of the Federation Council's work, its less developed committee structure, and its lesser powers vis-à-vis the State Duma make it more a consultative and reviewing body than a law-making chamber.

Because the Federation Council initially included many regional administrators appointed by Yeltsin, that body often supported the president and objected to bills approved by the State Duma, which had more anti-Yeltsin deputies. The power of the upper house to consider bills passed by the lower chamber resulted in its disapproval of about one-half of such bills, necessitating concessions by the State Duma or votes to override upper-chamber objections. In February 1996, the heads of the two chambers pledged to try to break this habit, but wrangling appeared to intensify in the months that followed.

The State Duma confirms the appointment of the prime minister, although it does not have the power to confirm Government ministers. The power to confirm or reject the prime minister is severely limited. According to the 1993 constitution, the State Duma must decide within one week to confirm or reject a candidate once the president has placed that person's name in nomination. If it rejects three candidates, the president is empowered to appoint a prime minister, dissolve the parliament, and schedule new legislative elections.

The State Duma's power to force the resignation of the Government also is severely limited. It may express a vote of no-confidence in the Government by a majority vote of all members of the State Duma, but the president is allowed to disregard this vote. If, however, the State Duma repeats the no-confidence vote within three months, the president may dismiss the Government. But the likelihood of a second no-confidence vote is virtually precluded by the constitutional provision allowing the president to dissolve the State Duma rather than the Government in such a situation. The Government's position is further buttressed by another constitutional provision that allows the Government at any time to demand a vote of confidence from the State Duma; refusal is grounds for the president to dissolve the Duma.

==== The legislative process ====
The legislative process in Russia includes three hearings in the State Duma, then approvals by the Federation Council, the upper house and sign into law by the President.

Draft laws may originate in either legislative chamber, or they may be submitted by the president, the Government, local legislatures and the Supreme Court, the Constitutional Court, or the High Court of Arbitration within their respective competences. Draft laws are first considered in the State Duma. Upon adoption by a majority of the full State Duma membership, a draft law is considered by the Federation Council, which has fourteen days to place the bill on its calendar. Conciliation commissions are the prescribed procedure to work out differences in bills considered by both chambers.

A constitutional provision dictating that draft laws dealing with revenues and expenditures may be considered "only when the Government's findings are known" substantially limits the Federal Assembly's control of state finances. However, the legislature may alter finance legislation submitted by the Government at a later time, a power that provides a degree of traditional legislative control over the purse. The two chambers of the legislature also have the power to override a presidential veto of legislation. The constitution requires at least a two-thirds vote of the total number of members of both chambers.

== Judicial branch ==
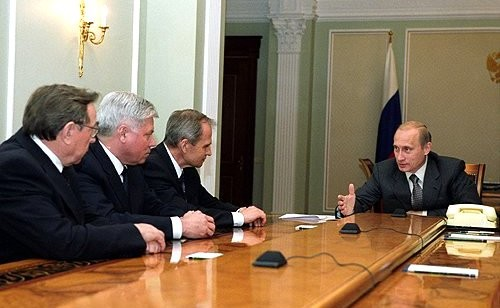
President Putin meeting Russia's highest courts heads (Veniamin Yakovlev of the High Court of Arbitration, Vyacheslav Lebedev of the Supreme Court, and Valery Zorkin of the Constitutional Court), 2003

The Judiciary of Russia is defined under the Constitution and law of Russia with a hierarchical structure with the Constitutional Court, Supreme Court, and High Court of Arbitration at the apex. As of 2014, the High Court of Arbitration has merged with the Supreme Court. The district courts are the primary criminal trial courts, and the regional courts are the primary appellate courts. The judiciary is governed by the All-Russian Congress of Judges and its Council of Judges, and its management is aided by the Judicial Department of the Supreme Court, the Judicial Qualification Collegia, the Ministry of Justice, and the various courts' chairpersons. There are many officers of the court, including jurors, but the Prosecutor General remains the most powerful component of the Russian judicial system.

Many judges appointed by the regimes of Leonid Brezhnev (in office 1964-82) and Yuri Andropov (in office 1982-84) remained in place in the mid-1990s. Such arbiters were trained in "socialist law" and had become accustomed to basing their verdicts on telephone calls from local CPSU bosses rather than on the legal merits of cases.

For court infrastructure and financial support, judges must depend on the Ministry of Justice, and for housing they must depend on local authorities in the jurisdiction where they sit. In 1995 the average salary for a judge was US$160 per month, substantially less than the earnings associated with more menial positions in Russian society. These circumstances, combined with irregularities in the appointment process and the continued strong position of the procurators, deprived judges in the lower jurisdictions of independent authority.

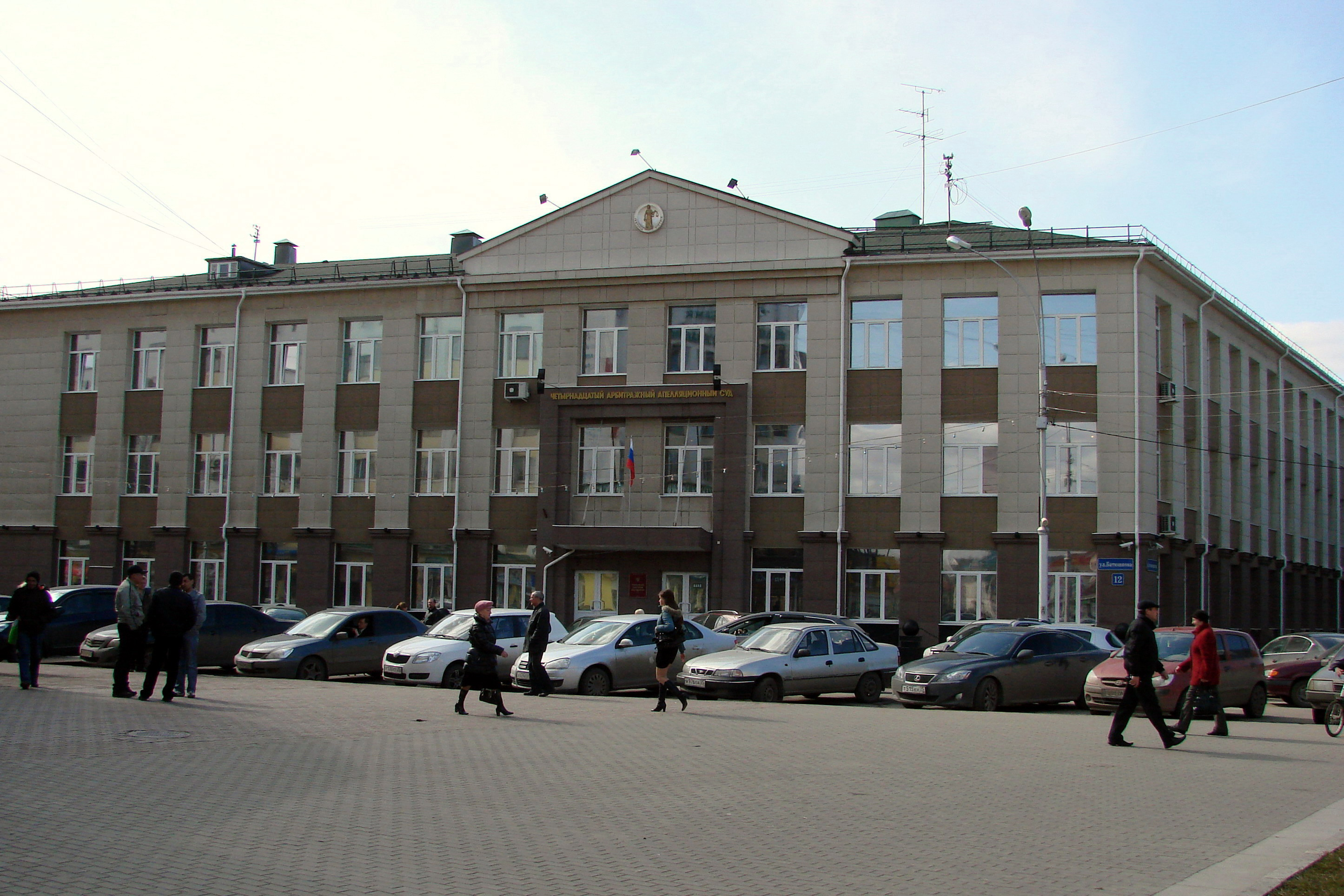
An arbitration court of appeals in Vologda

Numerous matters which are dealt with by administrative authority in European countries remain subject to political influence in Russia. The Constitutional Court of Russia was reconvened in March 1995 following its suspension by President Yeltsin during the October 1993 constitutional crisis. The 1993 constitution empowers the court to arbitrate disputes between the executive and legislative branches and between Moscow and the regional and local governments. The court also is authorized to rule on violations of constitutional rights, to examine appeals from various bodies, and to participate in impeachment proceedings against the president. The July 1994 Law on the Constitutional Court prohibits the court from examining cases on its own initiative and limits the scope of issues the court can hear.

The State Duma passed a Criminal Procedure Code and other judicial reforms during its 2001 session. These reforms help make the Russian judicial system more compatible with its Western counterparts and are seen by most as an accomplishment in human rights. The reforms have reintroduced jury trials in certain criminal cases and created a more adversarial system of criminal trials that protect the rights of defendants more adequately. In 2002, the introduction of the new code led to significant reductions in time spent in detention for new detainees, and the number of suspects placed in pretrial detention declined by 30%. Another significant advance in the new Code is the transfer from the Procuracy to the courts of the authority to issue search and arrest warrants.

== Local and regional government ==
In the Soviet period, some of Russia's approximately 100 nationalities were granted their own ethnic enclaves, to which varying formal federal rights were attached. Other smaller or more dispersed nationalities did not receive such recognition. In most of these enclaves, ethnic Russians constituted a majority of the population, although the titular nationalities usually enjoyed disproportionate representation in local government bodies. Relations between the central government and the subordinate jurisdictions, and among those jurisdictions, became a political issue in the 1990s.

The Russian Federation has made few changes in the Soviet pattern of regional jurisdictions. The 1993 constitution establishes a federal government and enumerates eighty-nine subnational jurisdictions, including twenty-one ethnic enclaves with the status of republics. There are ten autonomous regions, or okruga (sing., okrug ), and the Jewish Autonomous Oblast. Besides the ethnically identified jurisdictions, there are six territories (kraya; sing., kray ) and forty-nine oblasts (provinces).

The cities of Moscow and St. Petersburg are independent of surrounding jurisdictions. Termed "cities of federal significance," they have the same status as the oblasts. The ten autonomous regions and Birobidzhan are part of larger jurisdictions, either an oblast or a territory. As the power and influence of the central government have become diluted, governors and mayors have become the only relevant government authorities in many jurisdictions.

=== The Federation Treaty and regional power ===
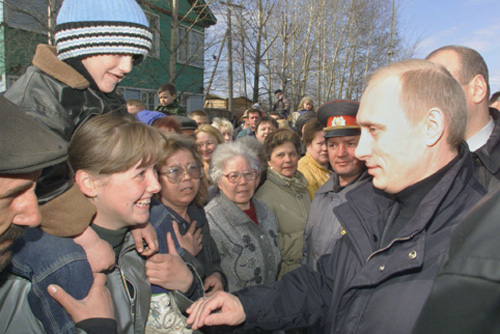
Russian President Putin with local residents in Lensk, Sakha Republic

The Federation Treaty was signed in March 1992 by President Yeltsin and most leaders of the autonomous republics and other ethnic and geographical subunits. The treaty consisted of three separate documents, each pertaining to one type of regional jurisdiction. It outlined powers reserved for the central government, shared powers, and residual powers to be exercised primarily by the subunits. Because Russia's new constitution remained in dispute in the Federal Assembly at the time of ratification, the Federation Treaty and provisions based on the treaty were incorporated as amendments to the 1978 constitution. A series of new conditions were established by the 1993 constitution and by bilateral agreements.

=== Local jurisdictions under the constitution ===
The constitution of 1993 resolved many of the ambiguities and contradictions concerning the degree of decentralization under the much-amended 1978 constitution of the Russian Republic; most such solutions favored the concentration of power in the central government. When the constitution was ratified, the Federation Treaty was demoted to the status of a subconstitutional document. A transitional provision of the constitution provided that in case of discrepancies between the federal constitution and the Federation Treaty, or between the constitution and other treaties involving a subnational jurisdiction, all other documents would defer to the constitution.

The 1993 constitution presents a daunting list of powers reserved to the center. Powers shared jointly between the federal and local authorities are less numerous. Regional jurisdictions are only allocated powers not specifically reserved to the federal government or exercised jointly. Those powers include managing municipal property, establishing and executing regional budgets, establishing and collecting regional taxes, and maintaining law and order. Some of the boundaries between joint and exclusively federal powers are vaguely prescribed; presumably, they would become clearer through the give and take of federal practice or through adjudication, as has occurred in other federal systems. Meanwhile, bilateral power-sharing treaties between the central government and the subunits have become an important means of clarifying the boundaries of shared powers. Many subnational jurisdictions have their own constitutions, however, and often those documents allocate powers to the jurisdiction inconsistent with provisions of the federal constitution. As of 1996, no process had been devised for adjudication of such conflicts.

Under the 1993 constitution, the republics, territories, oblasts, autonomous oblast, autonomous regions, and cities of federal designation are held to be "equal in their relations with the federal agencies of state power"; this language represents an attempt to end the complaints of the nonrepublic jurisdictions about their inferior status. In keeping with this new equality, republics no longer receive the epithet "sovereign," as they did in the 1978 constitution. Equal representation in the Federation Council for all eighty-nine jurisdictions furthers the equalization process by providing them meaningful input into legislative activities, particularly those of special local concern.

However, Federation Council officials have criticized the State Duma for failing to represent regional interests adequately. In mid-1995 Vladimir Shumeyko, then speaker of the Federation Council, criticized the current electoral system's party-list provision for allowing some parts of Russia to receive disproportionate representation in the lower house. (In the 1995 elections, Moscow Oblast received nearly 38 percent of the State Duma's seats based on the concentration of party-list candidates in the national capital.) Shumeyko contended that such misallocation fed potentially dangerous popular discontent with the parliament and politicians.

Despite constitutional language equalizing the regional jurisdictions in their relations with the center, vestiges of Soviet-era multitiered federalism remain in a number of provisions, including those allowing for the use of non-Russian languages in the republics but not in other jurisdictions, and in the definitions of the five categories of subunit. On most details of the federal system, the constitution is vague, and clarifying legislation had not been passed by mid-1996. However, some analysts have pointed out that this vagueness facilitates the resolution of individual conflicts between the center and the regions.

=== Power sharing ===
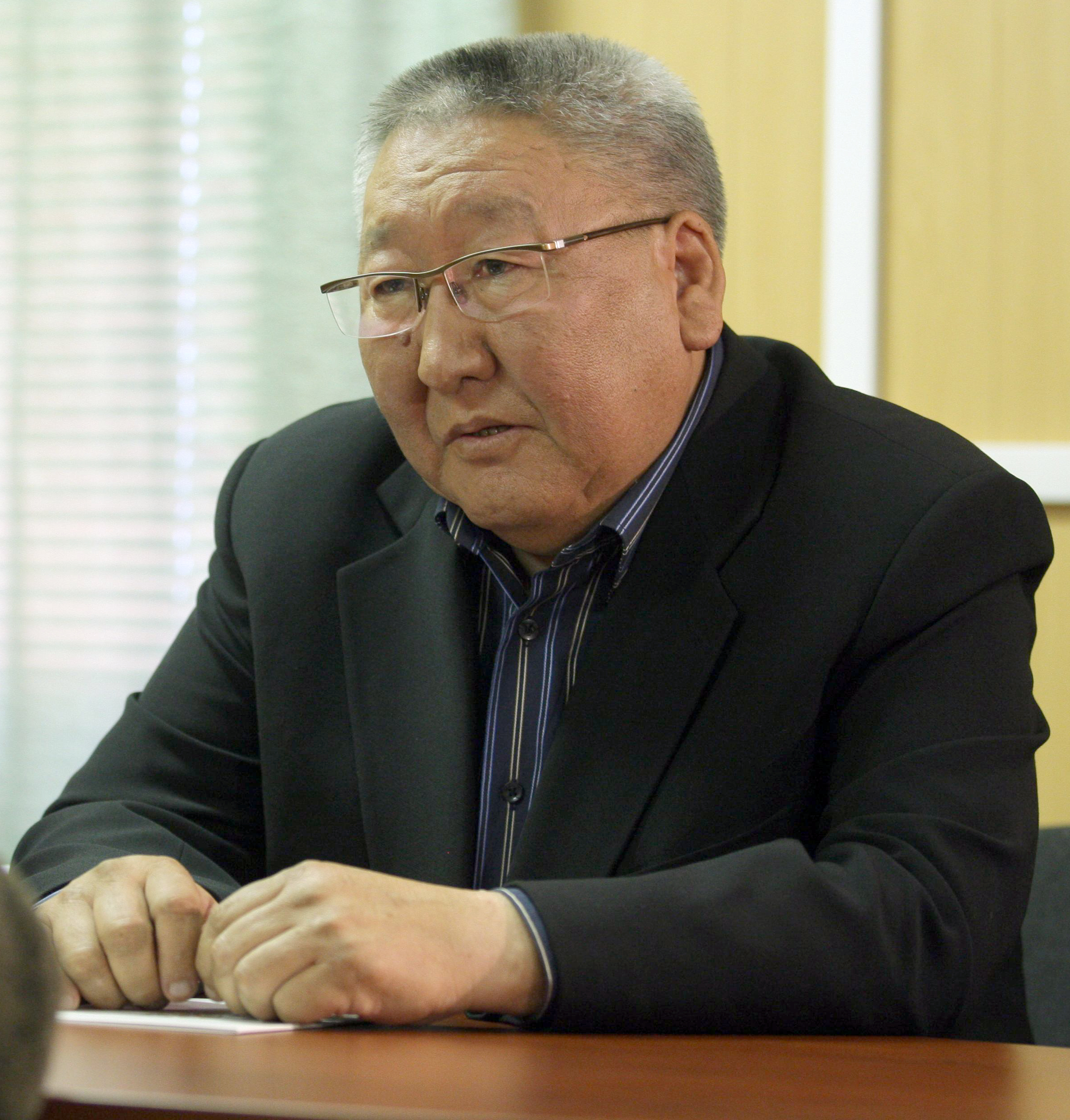
Yegor Borisov, president of the Sakha Republic, a federal subject of Russia.

Flexibility is a goal of the constitutional provision allowing bilateral treaties or charters between the central government and the regions on power sharing. For instance, in the bilateral treaty signed with the Russian government in February 1994, the Republic of Tatarstan gave up its claim to sovereignty and accepted Russia's taxing authority, in return for Russia's acceptance of Tatar control over oil and other resources and the republic's right to sign economic agreements with other countries. This treaty has particular significance because Tatarstan was one of the two republics that did not sign the Federation Treaty in 1992. By mid-1996 almost one-third of the federal subunits had concluded power-sharing treaties or charters.

The first power-sharing charter negotiated by the central government and an oblast was signed in December 1995 with Orenburg Oblast. The charter divided power in the areas of economic and agricultural policy, natural resources, international economic relations and trade, and military industries. According to Prime Minister Chernomyrdin, the charter gave Orenburg full power over its budget and allowed the oblast to participate in privatization decisions. By early 1996, similar charters had been signed with Krasnodar Territory and Kaliningrad and Sverdlovsk oblasts. In the summer of 1996, Yeltsin wooed potential regional supporters of his reelection by signing charters with Perm', Rostov, Tver', and Leningrad oblasts and with the city of St. Petersburg, among others, granting these regions liberal tax treatment and other economic advantages.

By the mid-1990s, regional jurisdictions also had become bolder in passing local legislation to fill gaps in federation statutes rather than waiting for the Federal Assembly to act. For example, Volgograd Oblast passed laws regulating local pensions, the issuance of promissory notes, and credit unions. The constitution upholds regional legislative authority to pass laws that accord with the constitution and existing federal laws.

==== List of power-sharing treaties ====
During Boris Yeltin's presidency, he signed a total of 46 power-sharing treaties with Russia's various subjects starting with Tatarstan on 15 February 1994 and ending with Moscow on 16 June 1998, giving them greater autonomy from the federal government. According to Prime Minister Viktor Chernomyrdin, the government intended to sign power-sharing agreements with all of Russia's 89 subjects. Following the election of Vladimir Putin on 26 March 2000 and his subsequent overhaul of the federal system, the power-sharing treaties began to be abolished. The vast majority of treaties were terminated between 2001 and 2002 while others were forcibly annulled on 4 July 2003. Bashkortostan, Moscow, and Tatarstan's treaties expired on their own individual dates. On 24 July 2017, Tatarstan's power-sharing treaty expired, making it the last subject to lose its autonomy.

===== Republics =====
1. Bashkortostan 3 August 1994 – 7 July 2005
2. Buryatia 11 July 1995 – 15 February 2002
3. Chuvashia 27 May 1996 – 4 July 2003 (Note: Terminated on the basis of Article 5 of the Federal Law passed on 4 July 2003.)
4. Kabardino-Balkaria 1 July 1994 – 8 August 2002
5. Komi Republic 20 March 1996 – 20 May 2002
6. Mari El 21 May 1998 – 31 December 2001
7. North Ossetia–Alania 23 March 1995 – 2 September 2002
8. Sakha Republic 29 June 1995 – 4 July 2003
9. Tatarstan 15 February 1994 – 24 July 2017
10. Udmurtia 17 October 1995 – 4 July 2003

===== Krais =====
1. Altai Krai 29 November 1996 – 15 March 2002
2. Khabarovsk Krai 24 April 1996 – 12 August 2002
3. Krasnodar Krai 30 January 1996 – 12 April 2002
4. Krasnoyarsk Krai 1 November 1997 – 4 July 2003

===== Oblasts =====
1. Amur Oblast 21 May 1998 – 18 March 2002
2. Astrakhan Oblast 30 October 1997 – 21 December 2001
3. Bryansk Oblast 4 July 1997 – 9 August 2002
4. Chelyabinsk Oblast 4 July 1997 – 2 February 2002
5. Ivanovo Oblast 21 May 1998 – 26 February 2002
6. Irkutsk Oblast 27 May 1996 – 6 July 2002
7. Kaliningrad Oblast 12 January 1996 – 31 May 2002
8. Kirov Oblast 30 October 1997 – 24 January 2002
9. Kostroma Oblast 21 May 1998 – 19 February 2002
10. Leningrad Oblast 13 June 1996 – 18 April 2002
11. Magadan Oblast 4 July 1997 – 30 January 2002
12. Murmansk Oblast 30 October 1997 – 20 May 2003
13. Nizhny Novgorod Oblast 8 June 1996 – 6 April 2002
14. Omsk Oblast 19 May 1996 – 21 December 2001
15. Orenburg Oblast 30 January 1996 – 4 April 2002
16. Perm Oblast 31 May 1996 – 21 December 2001
17. Rostov Oblast 29 May 1996 – 15 March 2002
18. Sakhalin Oblast 29 May 1996 – 4 March 2002
19. Samara Oblast 1 August 1997 – 22 February 2002
20. Saratov Oblast 4 July 1997 – 9 February 2002
21. Sverdlovsk Oblast 12 January 1996 – 4 July 2003
22. Tver Oblast 13 June 1996 – 19 February 2002
23. Ulyanovsk Oblast 30 October 1997 – 31 December 2001
24. Vologda Oblast 4 July 1997 – 15 March 2002
25. Voronezh Oblast 21 May 1998 – 22 February 2002
26. Yaroslavl Oblast 30 October 1997 – 15 March 2002

===== Autonomous Okrugs =====
1. Evenk Autonomous Okrug (Note: Krasnoyarsk, Evenk, and Taymyr had the same treaty as the latter two were administered by Krasnoyarsk.) 1 November 1997 – 4 July 2003
2. Komi-Permyak Autonomous Okrug (Note: Perm and Komi-Permyak had the same treaty as the latter was administered by Perm.) 31 May 1996 – 21 December 2001
3. Taymyr Autonomous Okrug 1 November 1997 – 4 July 2003
4. Ust-Orda Buryat Autonomous Okrug (Note: Irkutsk and Ust-Orda had the same treaty as the latter was administered by Irkutsk.) 27 May 1996 – 6 July 2002

===== Federal Cities =====
1. Moscow 16 June 1998 – 16 June 2008
2. St. Petersburg 13 June 1996 – 4 April 2002

=== Presidential power in the regions ===
The president retains the power to appoint and remove presidential representatives, who act as direct emissaries to the jurisdictions in overseeing local administrations' implementation of presidential policies. The power to appoint these overseers was granted by the Russian Supreme Soviet to Yeltsin in late 1991. The parliament attempted several times during 1992-93 to repeal or curtail the activities of these appointees, whose powers are only alluded to in the constitution. The presence of Yeltsin's representatives helped bring out the local vote on his behalf in the 1996 presidential election.

The governments of the republics include a president or prime minister (or both) and a regional council or legislature. The chief executives of lower jurisdictions are called governors or administrative heads. Generally, in jurisdictions other than republics the executive branches have been more sympathetic to the central government, and the legislatures (called soviets until late 1993, then called dumas or assemblies) have been the center of whatever separatist sentiment exists. Under the power given him in 1991 to appoint the chief executives of territories, oblasts, autonomous regions, and the autonomous oblast, Yeltsin had appointed virtually all of the sixty-six leaders of those jurisdictions. By contrast, republic presidents have been popularly elected since 1992. Some of Yeltsin's appointees have encountered strong opposition from their legislatures; in 1992 and 1993, in some cases, votes of no-confidence brought about popular elections for the position of chief executive.

After the Moscow confrontation of October 1993, Yeltsin sought to bolster his regional support by dissolving the legislatures of all federal subunits except the republics (which were advised to "reform" their political systems). Accordingly, in 1994 elections were held in all the jurisdictions whose legislatures had been dismissed. In some cases, that process placed local executives at the head of legislative bodies, eliminating checks and balances between the branches at the regional level.

Election results in the subnational jurisdictions held great significance for the Yeltsin administration because the winners would fill the ex officio seats in the Federation Council, which until 1996 was a reliable bastion of support. The election of large numbers of opposition candidates would end the Federation Council's usefulness as a balance against the anti-Yeltsin State Duma and further impede Yeltsin's agenda. In 1995 some regions held gubernatorial elections to fill the administrative posts originally granted to Yeltsin appointees in 1991.

Faced with an escalating number of requests for such elections, Yeltsin decreed December 1996 as the date for most gubernatorial and republic presidential elections. This date was confirmed by a 1995 Federation Council law. The decree also set subnational legislative elections for June or December 1997. (In July 1996, the State Duma advanced these elections to late 1996.) Observers noted that by calling for most of these elections to take place after the presidential election, Yeltsin prevented unfavorable outcomes from possibly reducing his reelection chances—even though voter apathy after the presidential election had the potential to help opposition candidates.

== Political parties and elections ==
Formerly seats in Russia the Duma were elected half by proportional representation (with at least 5% of the vote to qualify for seats) and half by single member districts. However, President Putin passed a law that all seats are to be elected by proportional representation (with at least 7% of the vote to qualify for seats) to take effect in the December 2007 elections. By doing this Putin has eliminated independents and made it more difficult for small parties to be elected to the Duma. An opinion poll in 2026 showed decreasing public support for the government of Russia.

== Separatism ==
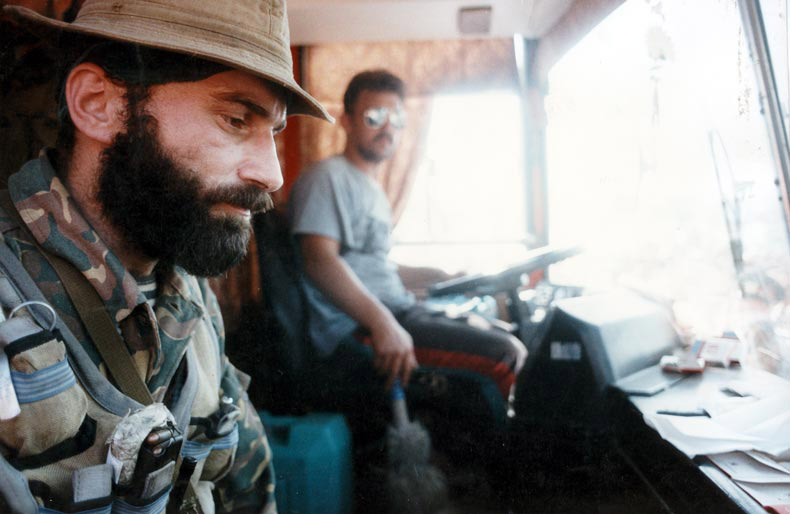
Shamil Basayev, Chechen militant Islamist and a leader of the Chechen rebel movement

In the first half of the 1990s, observers speculated that some of the federation's jurisdictions might emulate the former Soviet republics and demand full independence. Several factors militate against such an outcome, however. Russia is more than 80 percent ethnic Russian, and most of the thirty-two ethnically based jurisdictions are demographically dominated by ethnic Russians, as are all of the territories and oblasts. Many of the subnational jurisdictions are in the interior of Russia, meaning that they could not break away without joining a bloc of seceding border areas, and the economies of all such jurisdictions were thoroughly integrated with the national economy in the Soviet system. The 1993 constitution strengthens the official status of the central government in relation to the various regions, although Moscow has made significant concessions in bilateral treaties. Finally, most of the differences at the base of separatist movements are economic and geographic rather than ethnic.

Advocates of secession, numerous in several regions, generally appear to be in the minority and are unevenly dispersed. Some regions have even advocated greater centralization on some matters. By 1996 most experts believed that the federation would hold together, although probably at the expense of additional concessions of power by the central government. The trend is not toward separatism so much as the devolution of central powers to the localities on trade, taxes, and other matters.

Some experts observe that Russia's ethnically distinct Republics pressing claims for greater subunit rights fall into three groups. The first is composed of those jurisdictions most vociferous in pressing ethnic separatism, including Chechnya and perhaps other republics of the North Caucasus and the Republic of Tuva. The second group consists of large, resource-rich republics, including Karelia, Komi Republic, and Sakha (Yakutia). Their differences with Moscow center on resource control and taxes rather than demands for outright independence. A third mixed group consists of republics along the Volga River, which straddle strategic water, rail, and pipeline routes, possess resources such as oil, and include large numbers of Russia's Muslim and Buddhist populations. These republics include Bashkortostan, Kalmykia, Mari El, Mordovia, Tatarstan, and Udmurtia.

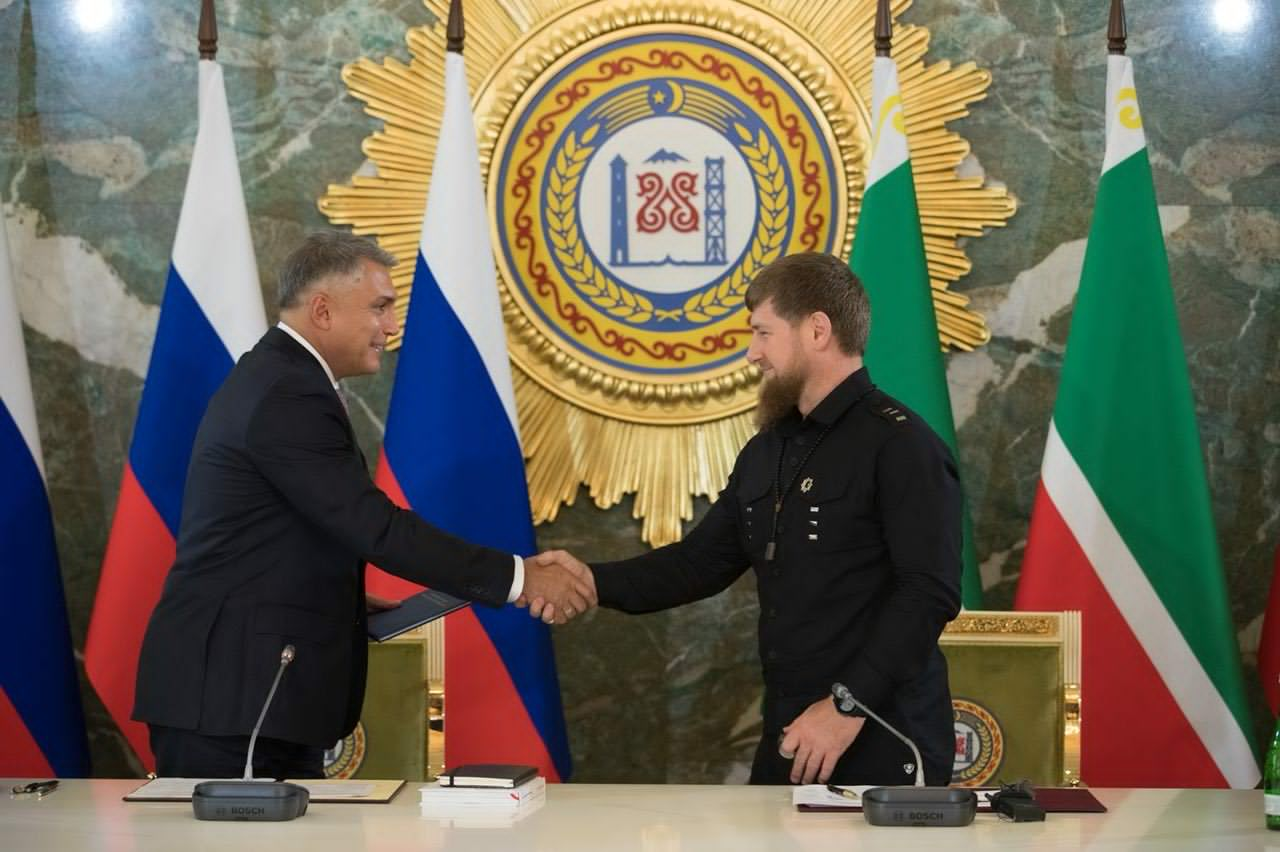
Chechen President Ramzan Kadyrov, the former separatist rebel

In addition to the republics, several other jurisdictions have lobbied for greater rights, mainly on resource control and taxation questions. These include Sverdlovsk Oblast, which in 1993 proclaimed itself an autonomous republic as a protest against receiving fewer privileges in taxation and resource control than the republics, and strategically vital Primorsky Krai ("Maritime Territory") on the Pacific coast, whose governor in the mid-1990s, Yevgeniy Nazdratenko, defied central economic and political policies on a number of well-publicized issues.

Some limited cooperation has occurred among Russia's regional jurisdictions, and experts believe there is potential for even greater coordination. Eight regional cooperation organizations have been established, covering all subnational jurisdictions except Chechnya: the Siberian Accord Association; the Central Russia Association; the Northwest Association; the Black Earth Association; the Cooperation Association of North Caucasus Republics, Territories, and Oblasts; the Greater Volga Association; the Ural Regional Association; and the Far East and Baikal Association. The Federation Council formally recognized these inter-jurisdictional organizations in 1994. Expansion of the organizations' activities is hampered by economic inequalities among their members and inadequate interregional transportation infrastructure, but in 1996 they began increasing their influence in Moscow.

Regional and ethnic conflicts have encouraged proposals to abolish the existing subunits and resurrect the tsarist-era guberniya, or large province. This would incorporate several smaller subunits based on geography and population rather than ethnic considerations. Russian ultranationalists such as Vladimir Zhirinovsky have been joined in supporting this proposal by some officials of the national Government and oblast and territory leaders who resent the privileges of the republics. Some have called for these new subunits to be based on the eight interregional economic associations.

== Other issues ==
According to a 2026 opinion poll the main political issues for Russians were cost of living, corruption, immigration, internet censorship in Russia and impact of Russo-Ukrainian war.

The constitution guarantees citizens the right to choose their place of residence and to travel abroad. Some big-city governments, however, have restricted this right through residential registration rules that closely resemble the Soviet-era "propiska" regulations. Although the rules were touted as a notification device rather than a control system, their implementation has produced many of the same results as the propiska system. The freedom to travel abroad and emigrate is respected although restrictions may apply to those who have had access to state secrets.

== See also ==
- 1991 Russian presidential referendum
- Anarchism in Russia
- Cabinets:
  - Sergei Kiriyenko's Cabinet (1998)
  - Yevgeny Primakov's Cabinet (1998–1999)
  - Mikhail Fradkov's Second Cabinet (2004–2007)
- Censorship in Russia
  - List of journalists killed in Russia
- Conservatism in Russia
- Corruption in Russia
- Economy of Russia
  - Economic history of the Russian Federation
- Electoral geography of Russia
- Federation Council of Russia
- Foreign relations of Russia
- Freedom of assembly in Russia
- Human rights in Russia
- Kremlinology
- Law of the Russian Federation
- Liberalism in Russia
- Opposition to Vladimir Putin in Russia
- Public Chamber of Russia
- Project Russia
- Russian presidential administration
- Tsarist autocracy
