= Council of Ministers of the Russian Soviet Federative Socialist Republic =

Council of Ministers of the RSFSR
- Совет министров РСФСР

Overview
- Established: 15 March 1946
- Dissolved: 25 December 1992
- State: Russian SFSR
- Leader: Chairman
- Main organ: Council of Ministers
- Headquarters: Osterman Estate (1946-1981); House of Soviets of the RSFSR (1981-1991)

Council of Ministers of the Russian Soviet Federative Socialist Republic (Russian: Совет министров РСФСР) was the highest executive and administrative body of state governance of the Russian Soviet Federative Socialist Republic (RSFSR), a republic in the Soviet Union, until May 1991, succeeding the Council of People's Commissars of the Russian Soviet Federative Socialist Republic. Altogether it operated from 1946 to 1993. In December 1991, it was renamed the Council of Ministers of the Russian Federation, and in 1993—following the adoption of a new constitution— it was renamed the Government of the Russian Federation, which currently serves as the federal executive authority in the Russian Federation.

== History ==
=== Formation ===
Under the USSR Law of March 15, 1946, the Council of People's Commissars of the USSR and the Councils of People's Commissars of the union republics and autonomous republics were transformed into the corresponding Councils of Ministers. Pursuant to this, a decree by the Presidium of the Supreme Soviet of the RSFSR dated March 23 of the same year transformed the Council of People's Commissars of the RSFSR into the Council of Ministers of the RSFSR. Corresponding amendments were made to the RSFSR Constitution on March 13, 1948.

=== 1978 RSFSR Constitution ===
From April 12, 1978—following the entry into force of the new RSFSR Constitution—the list of union-republic and republic ministries and state committees of the RSFSR was determined by a separate Law on the Council of Ministers of the RSFSR, rather than by the Constitution as had previously been the case.

Under the 1979 law, the Council of Ministers of the RSFSR was granted broad powers to address matters of state administration falling within the jurisdiction of the RSFSR that did not lie within the competence of the Supreme Soviet of the RSFSR or the Presidium of the Supreme Soviet of the RSFSR.

On October 27, 1989, the chairmen of the Councils of Ministers of the autonomous republics were included in the composition of the Council of Ministers of the RSFSR.

=== Final years of the Soviet Union ===
On May 24, 1991, an amendment was made to Article 122 of the RSFSR Constitution stripping the Council of Ministers of its status as the highest organ of state power—a move inconsistent with Article 139 of the Soviet Constitution. The Council of Ministers also lost its executive-administrative functions (likewise inconsistent with Article 139 of the USSR Constitution) and became accountable solely to the President of the RSFSR. Prior to this, it had been accountable to the Congress of People's Deputies and the Supreme Soviet of the RSFSR. Since the USSR Constitution remained in force, the RSFSR Council of Ministers was entitled to act in accordance with it.

Following his victory in the RSFSR presidential election in the summer of 1991, Yeltsin began implementing radical economic reforms. For the duration of the economic reform period, the President assumed direct leadership of the government led by Yegor Gaidar and tasked the existing Council of Ministers of the RSFSR with managing the country's economy until the formation of a new government body—headed personally by the RSFSR President and designated the "Government of the RSFSR", even though the RSFSR Constitution retained the term "Council of Ministers" and the office of Chairman of the Council of Ministers.

On November 15, 1991, the entire Council of Ministers of the RSFSR was dismissed. No Council of Ministers was formed, nor was a Chairman appointed, until December 14, 1992.

In connection with the renaming of the RSFSR to the Russian Federation, pursuant to a law adopted by the Supreme Soviet of the RSFSR on December 25, 1991, the Council of Ministers of the RSFSR received a new official name: the Council of Ministers of the Russian Federation. On April 21, 1992, the Congress of People's Deputies of Russia approved the renaming by adopting the corresponding amendments to the Constitution of the RSFSR.

=== Following the dissolution of the USSR ===
Following the dissolution of the USSR on December 26, 1991, the Council of Ministers of the Russian Federation (RSFSR) became the de facto government of an independent state; it ceased to be guided in its activities by the provisions of the USSR Constitution, USSR laws, and decisions of the Cabinet of Ministers of the Soviet Union—rules it had previously been required to follow under USSR and RSFSR legislation. Late 1991 saw the beginning of the liquidation of Union-level ministries and agencies and the transfer of their functions and assets to republican bodies. Many functions of the USSR Cabinet of Ministers were transferred to the RSFSR government.

On May 16, 1992, the independence of Russian government bodies was legally enshrined in a new version of the RSFSR Constitution, which removed clauses subjecting Russian state authorities to Union-level jurisdiction in certain matters. At the same time, the Soviet constitution and Soviet laws continued to be referenced in Articles 4 and 102 of the Constitution of the Russian Federation—Russia (RSFSR), despite numerous amendments having been made to the Constitution to remove references to the USSR.

On December 9, 1992, an amendment was made to Article 122 of the 1978 Constitution of the Russian Federation—Russia (RSFSR), making the Council of Ministers accountable not only to the President but also to the Congress of People's Deputies and the Supreme Soviet, restoring the arrangement that had existed prior to May 1991.

On December 14, 1992, Viktor Chernomyrdin was confirmed as Chairman of the Council of Ministers by a resolution of the 7th Congress of People's Deputies of Russia, and a few days later, the new powers of the Council of Ministers of the Russian Federation were defined in accordance with the Law "On the Council of Ministers—the Government of the Russian Federation".

On January 12, 1993, the RSFSR Law of August 3, 1979, "On the Council of Ministers of the RSFSR", ceased to be in effect entirely. On December 23, 1993, following the adoption of the new Russian Constitution, Russian President Boris Yeltsin issued a decree on the transformation and reorganization of Russian government bodies, under which the Council of Ministers of the Russian Federation was transformed into the Government of the Russian Federation. The decree mandated a reduction in the size of the government, a decrease in the number of ministries, state committees, and agencies, and a downsizing of the government apparatus, as well as the conversion of certain state committees into ministries..

== See also ==
- Council of Ministers of the Russian Empire
- Council of People's Commissars of the Russian Soviet Federative Socialist Republic
