= Russian parliament (disambiguation) =

Russian parliament may refer to:

- Federal Assembly, the current parliament of the Russia Federation since 1993
  - Federation Council (Senate), the upper house
  - State Duma, the lower house
- Congress of People's Deputies of Russia, former parliament from 1990 to 1993
- Supreme Soviet of Russia, the institution established in 1938
- parliament in the Russian Empire since 1906
  - State Council (Russian Empire), the upper house of the Russian Imperial parliament since 1906
  - State Duma (Russian Empire), the lower house of the Russian Imperial parliament
- Supreme Soviet of the Soviet Union, the highest body of state authority of the Union of Soviet Socialist Republics from 1938 to 1991
