= Constitution of the Russian Soviet Federative Socialist Republic =

Constitution of the Russian SFSR may refer to:

- 1918 Soviet Constitution
- 1925 Constitution of the Russian SFSR
- 1937 Constitution of the Russian SFSR
- 1978 Constitution of the Russian SFSR
