= 1993 Russian referendum =

1993 Russian referendum may refer to:

- 1993 Russian government referendum
- 1993 Russian constitutional referendum
