= Supreme Soviet of Russia =

Supreme government institution of Russian SFSR

Supreme Soviet of the Russian SFSR Supreme Soviet of the Russian Federation Верховный Совет РСФСР Верховный Совет Российской Федерации
- Coat of arms before (left) and after (right) the dissolution of the Soviet Union

Type
- Type: Supreme Council: Unicameral (until 1990); Bicameral (from 1990)
- Chambers: Soviet of Nationalities; Soviet of the Republic

History
- Established: 15 July 1938
- Disbanded: 4 October 1993
- Preceded by: All-Russian Congress of Soviets; Supreme Soviet of the Soviet Union (1991)
- Succeeded by: Constitutional Conference of Russia; Federal Assembly of Russia

Leadership
- Chairman of the Supreme Soviet: Ruslan Khasbulatov (last)
- Chairman of the Soviet of Nationalities: Ramazan Abdulatipov
- Chairman of the Soviet of Republic: Veniamin Sokolov
- Seats: Dynamic (1 deputy per 150,000 citizens) (1938–1978); 975 (1978–1990); 252 (1990–1993)

Elections
- Last general election: 16 May–22 June 1990; First session of the Congress of People's Deputies of Russia (indirect)^{*}

Meeting place
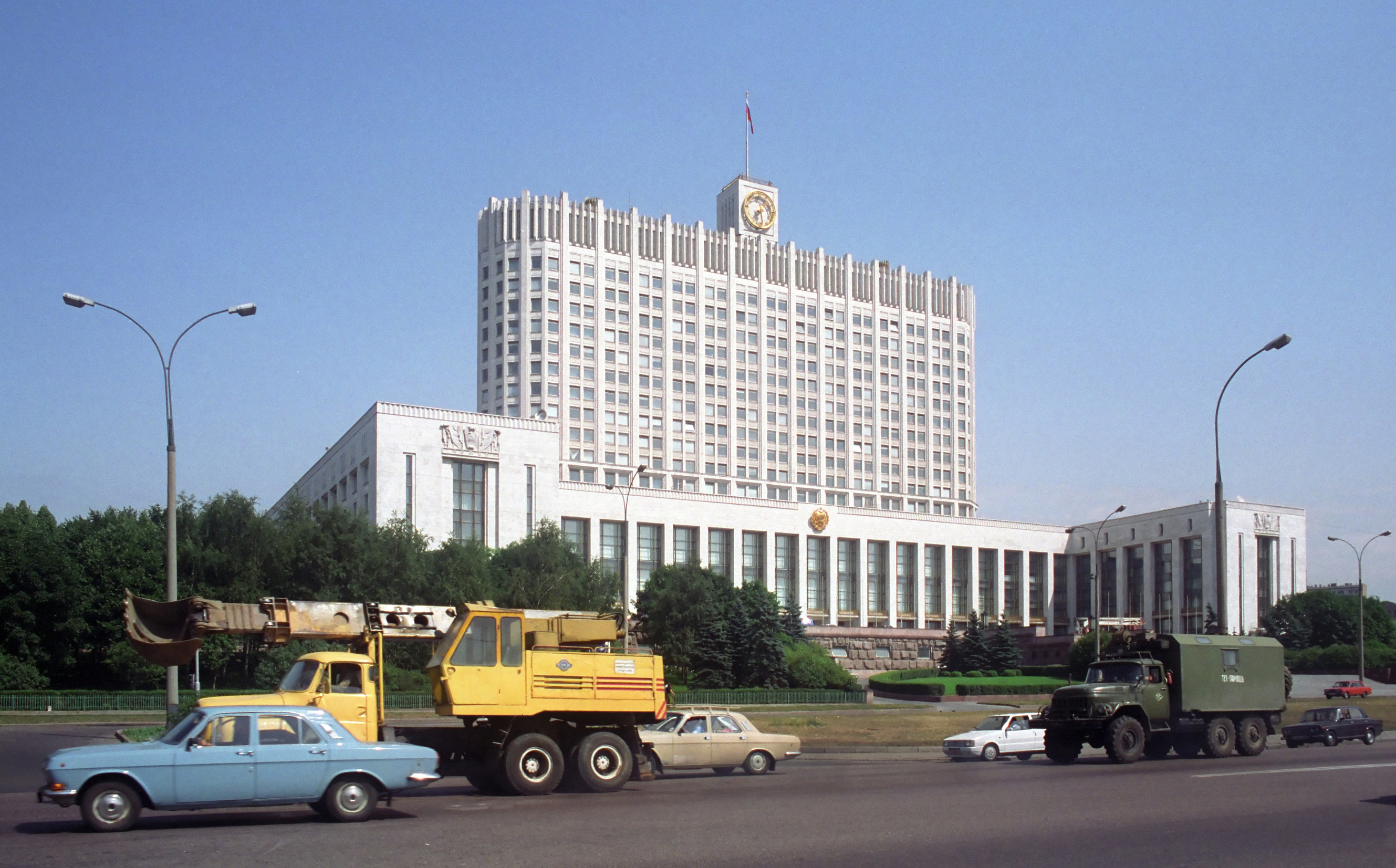
- White House

Footnotes
- Last direct general elections to the Supreme Soviet of the Russian SFSR were held in 1985. Powers of that Supreme Soviet (XI convocation) had expired in May 1990 (just some months after passage of the 1989 constitutional amendments)

The Supreme Soviet of the Russian SFSR, (Note: Russian: Верховный Совет РСФСР, romanized: Verkhovnyy Sovet RSFSR) later the Supreme Soviet of the Russian Federation, (Note: Russian: Верховный Совет Российской Федерации, romanized: Verkhovnyy Sovet Rossiyskoy Federacii) was the highest organ of state authority of the Russian SFSR from 1938 to 1990; between 1990 and 1993, it was the permanent organ of the Congress of People's Deputies of the Russian Federation.

The Supreme Soviet of the Russian SFSR was established to be similar in structure to the Supreme Soviet of the USSR in 1938, replacing the All-Russian Congress of Soviets as the highest organ of power of Russia.

In the 1940s, the Presidium of the Supreme Soviet and the Council of Ministers of the Russian SFSR were located in the former mansion of counts Osterman (3 Delegatskaya Street), which was later in 1991 given to a museum. The sessions were held in Grand Kremlin Palace. In 1981 the Supreme Soviet was moved to a specially constructed building on Krasnopresnenskaya embankment, The House of Soviets.

The Supreme Soviet was abolished in October 1993 (after the events of Russia's 1993 constitutional crisis) and replaced by the Federal Assembly of Russia (consists of the Federation Council of Russia and State Duma).

== 1938–1990 ==
=== Chairman of the Presidium of the Supreme Soviet of the Russian SFSR ===
Prior to 1990, the Chairman of the Presidium of the Supreme Soviet was head of state of the Russian SFSR but exercised only nominal powers. In contrast to other Soviet republics of the Soviet Union, the Russian SFSR did not have its own Communist Party and did not have its own first secretaries (which in other republics are relatively independent of power) until 1990.

Chairman of the Presidium of the Supreme Soviet of the Russian SFSR

Name	Period
Alexei Badaev	19 July 1938 – 4 March 1944
Ivan Vlasov (Acting Chairman)	9 April 1943 – 4 March 1944
Nikolay Shvernik	4 March 1944 – 25 June 1946
Ivan Vlasov	25 June 1946 – 7 July 1950
Mikhail Tarasov	7 July 1950 – 16 April 1959
Nikolai Ignatov	16 April–26 November 1959
Nikolai Organov	26 November 1959 – 20 December 1962
Nikolai Ignatov	20 December 1962 – 14 November 1966)
Vacant (Vice-Chairmen: Timofey Akhazov and Pyotr Sysoyev)	14 November – 23 December 1966
Mikhail Yasnov	23 December 1966 – 26 March 1985
Vladimir Orlov	26 March 1985 – 3 October 1988
Vitaly Vorotnikov	3 October 1988 – 29 May 1990

Chairman of the Supreme Soviet of the Russian SFSR in 1938–1990

Name	Period
Andrei Zhdanov	15 July 1938 – 20 June 1947
Mikhail Tarasov	20 June 1947 – 14 March 1951
Leonid Solovyov	14 March 1951 – 23 March 1955
Ivan Goroshkin	23 March 1955 – 15 April 1959
Vasily Prokhorov	15 April 1959 – 4 April 1963
Vasily Krestyaninov	4 April 1963 – 11 April 1967
Mikhail Millionshchikov	11 April 1967 – 27 May 1973
Vladimir Kotelnikov	30 July 1973 – 25 March 1980
Nikolai Gribachev	25 March 1980 – 16 May 1990

== 1990–1993 ==
Following the adoption of amendments to the Constitution of the Russian SFSR in October 1989, the office of Chairman of the Presidium of the Supreme Soviet was removed, and the position of the Russian head of state passed directly to the Chairman of the Supreme Soviet of the RSFSR in May 1990.

From 1990 to 1993 the Supreme Soviet consisted of 252 deputies in the two equal chambers—the Soviet of the Republic under Chairman Veniamin Sokolov, and the Soviet of Nationalities under Chairman Ramazan Abdulatipov. However, the bicameral Supreme Soviet was nominal, because the major decisions were adopted as joint resolutions and concurrent resolutions of all chambers; many of the special committees were shared between these chambers. The Supreme Soviet of Russia ceased to exist after the events of September–October 1993.

Chairmen of the Supreme Soviet of the Russian SFSR/Federation in 1990-1993

Name	Period
Boris Yeltsin	29 May 1990 – 10 July 1991
Ruslan Khasbulatov (acting)	10 July 1991 – 29 October 1991
Ruslan Khasbulatov	29 October 1991 – 4 October 1993

First Deputy Chairmen of the Supreme Soviet of the Russian SFSR/Federation 1990-1993

Name	Period
Ruslan Khasbulatov	29 May 1990 – 10 July 1991
Sergey Filatov	1 November 1991 – January 1993
Yuri Voronin	January 1993 – October 1993

== See also ==
- Declaration of State Sovereignty of the Russian Soviet Federative Socialist Republic
