= Soviet of Nationalities (Supreme Soviet of Russia) =

Soviet of Nationalities Совет Национальностей
- Supreme Soviet of the Russian Federation

Type
- Type: Upper house

History
- Established: 1990
- Disbanded: 1993
- Preceded by: Unicameral Supreme Soviet of the Russian SFSR; Soviet of the Republics (1991)
- Succeeded by: Federation Council

Leadership
- Chairman: Ramazan Abdulatipov
- Seats: 126

Elections
- Last election: 1990

Meeting place
- White House, Moscow

The Soviet of the Nationalities (Russian: Совет Национальностей) was one of the two chambers of the Supreme Soviet of the Russian SFSR (Russian Federation). In 1990–1993 it consisted of 126 deputies. The Soviet of the Republic was established in 1989, as one of the chambers of the formerly unicameral Supreme Soviet, and elected in 1990.

Soviet of Nationalities was elected by and from among the Congress of People's Deputies of the Russian Federation on the following basis:

- three deputies from each republic
- one deputy from each autonomous oblast
- one deputy from each autonomous district
- 63 deputies from krais, oblasts and federal cities of Russia.

On 1 November 1991 the Congress passed the following addition to the Constitution:

If it's impossible to represent republics of the Russian SFSR, autonomous oblast, autonomous districts, krais and oblasts in Soviet of Nationalities of the Supreme Soviet of the Russian SFSR, then deputies from the national districts may propose deputies from territorial districts to be included into Soviet of Nationalities.

This was intended to make chambers equally sized, because there are not enough deputies from national districts.

On 21 September 1993 the Soviet of Nationalities was disbanded by President of Russia, together with the Supreme Soviet and the Congress of People's Deputies. This got actual force after the armed siege of parliament.

== See also ==
- Soviet of the Republic
- Soviet of Nationalities of the Supreme Soviet of the Soviet Union
