= Russian Constitution of 1978 =

Supreme law in the Eurasian country until 1993

Supreme Soviet of the Russian SFSR
- Long title: Constitution of the Russian Soviet Federative Socialist Republic
- Territorial extent: Russian Soviet Federative Socialist Republic
- Enacted by: Supreme Soviet of the Russian SFSR
- Signed by: Mikhail Yasnov
- Effective: 12 April 1978; 48 years ago
- Repealed: 12 December 1993; 32 years ago

Repealed by
- Constitution of the Russian Federation
- Status: Repealed

In 1978, the Russian Soviet Federative Socialist Republic adopted a new state constitution as its supreme law.

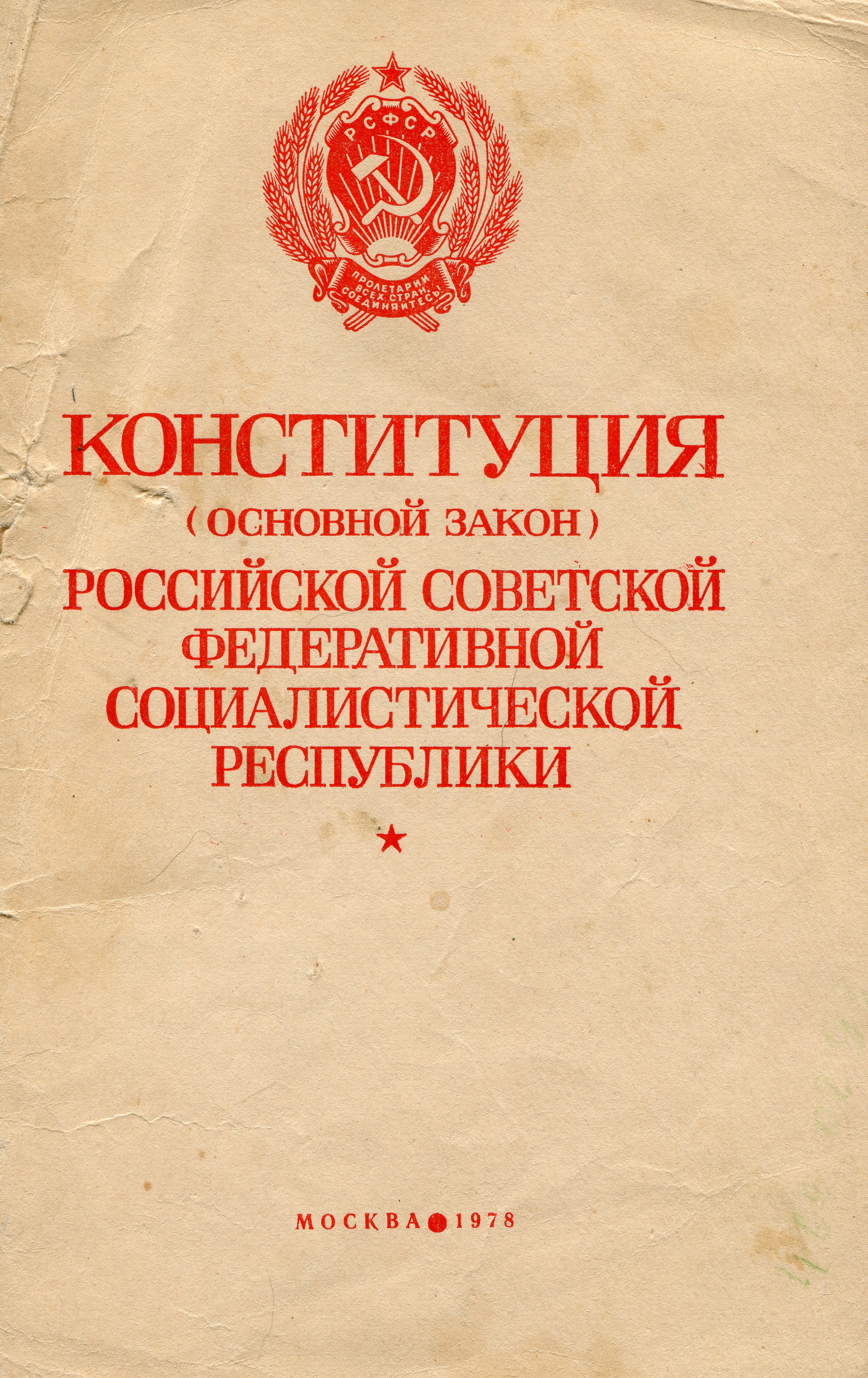
Constitution of Soviet Russia in 1978

== History ==
At an extraordinary session on 12 April 1978, the Supreme Soviet of the Russian SFSR adopted a new republican constitution to replace the old Russian Constitution of 1937. The new Constitution initially consisted of a preamble and 185 articles, and was prepared as part of a process bringing all 15 republican constitutions into line with the new Constitution of the Soviet Union of October 1977. It was the fourth constitution of the Russian SFSR.

Following a turbulent period of democratisation, the dissolution of the Soviet Union, and subsequent economic reform, the Constitution was amended several times. It was displaced by the referendum of 12 December 1993, which followed a power struggle between the President of Russia, Boris Yeltsin, and Russia's legislative institutions—the Congress of People's Deputies and the Supreme Soviet of Russia.

=== List of amendments ===
Amendment	date	New institutions/additions	Eliminated institutions
Law "On Modifications and Additions to Constitution (Fundamental Law) of the Russian SFSR"	27 October 1989	Congress of People's Deputies of the Russian SFSR; Congresses of People's Deputies of the Autonomous SSRs (allowed to be established, but not mandatory; only Dagestan ASSR decided to establish its own Congress); Explicit provision that number of nominated candidates in elections shall be unlimited, intended to end old Soviet practice of single-candidate elections.; Supreme Soviet of Russia becomes bicameral; Soviet of the Republic and Soviet of Nationalities established; Committee for Constitutional Supervision of the Russian SFSR; 10-year tenure for all judges (instead of former 5-year)	Chairman of the Presidium of the Supreme Soviet of the Russian Soviet Federative Socialist Republic (leadership passed directly to Chairman of the Supreme Soviet); Indirect elections of the Presidium of the Supreme Soviet (Presidium of the Supreme Soviet now formed ex officio instead); Direct elections to the Supreme Soviet of the Russian SFSR (Supreme Soviet now elected by Congress of People's Deputies instead)
Law "on modification of article 104 of the Constitution (Fundamental Law) of the Russian SFSR"	31 May 1990	Congress now elects chairman and three (instead of one) of deputy chairmen of the Supreme Soviet	None
Law "On Modifications and Additions to Constitution (Fundamental Law) of the Russian SFSR"	16 June 1990	Multi-party system	One-party system
Law "On Modifications and Additions to Constitution (Fundamental Law) of the Russian SFSR"	15 December 1990	Declaration of State Sovereignty of the Russian SFSR provisions introduced to constitution, notably preamble (replacing long Communist preamble of 1978) art. 1 (which now declares RSFSR as "sovereign state, created by the peoples, historically united in it" instead of "socialist state of the whole people...") and art. 76 (providing for nullification of USSR laws whenever they be deemed contrary to the "sovereign rights of the RSFSR"); Direct democracy has become explicitly recognized in Constitution (per new art 2); citizenship of the Russian SFSR; Right to hold property (incl., but not explicitly, private property) is recognized; Prosecutor General of the Russian SFSR, appointed by the Supreme Soviet and confirmed by Congress; Constitutional Court of the Russian SFSR	USSR-appointed office of the Prosecutor of the Russian SFSR; Committee for Constitutional Supervision of the Russian SFSR; Civil and political rights are no longer limited on ideological grounds, such as "aims of building communism" (art. 45, 49), "interests of the people" "strengthment and developing the socialist system" (art. 48) and similar.
Law "On Modifications and Additions to Constitution (Fundamental Law) of the Russian SFSR"	24 May 1991	Nationwide elected position of the President of the Russian SFSR has been established, in line with results of the 17 March 1991 referendum.; ASSRs promoted into Republics of the Russian SFSR; Arbitral tribunal became part of judiciary (Courts of arbitration with High Court of Arbitration of the RSFSR at the top of them)	Autonomous Soviet Socialist Republics (upgraded into republics); Gosarbitrazh, replaced by courts of arbitration
Law "On Modifications and Additions to Constitution (Fundamental Law) of the Russian SFSR because of reform of the local self-government"	24 May 1991	Local administrations	Ispolkoms
Law "On Modifications and Additions to Constitution (Fundamental Law) of the Russian SFSR because of transformation of Autonomous oblasts into Soviet Socialist Republics within RSFSR"	3 July 1991	Three new republics established	Three autonomous oblasts dissolved
Law "On Modifications and Additions to Constitution (Fundamental Law) of the Russian SFSR"	1 November 1991	Russian flag changed to white-azure-scarlet; Presidencies of Republics of the Russian SFSR are recognized; Jury trial has become part of the Judiciary of Russia	1954 flag of the Russian SFSR
Law "On Modifications and Additions to Constitution (Fundamental Law) of the Russian SFSR"	21 April 1992	Renaming of the Russian SFSR to the Russian Federation is confirmed; Federal Treaty became part of the Russian Constitution; Krais, oblasts and cities Moscow and Saint-Petersburg became Federal subjects of Russia; Russian sovereignty is finally confirmed; Declaration of Rights and Freedoms of Man and Citizen is made part of Constitution; Democracy, separation of powers and republican form of government and federalism) were declared as "unshakable foundations of the constitutional system", making first legislative usage of that term in the Russian constitutional law.	Articles related to Russian membership in the Soviet Union are mostly revoked, but some articles retained mentions of Soviet Constitution and laws; Principle of democratic centralism has been de jure revoked (while it was de facto abolished in 1937, with indirect-elected Congresses of Soviets).
Law "On Modifications and Additions to Constitution (Fundamental Law) of the Russian Federation"	9 December 1992	Provisions related to Armed Forces of the Russian Federation inserted into art. 30 ("The Russian Federation ensures the security and defence capability of the country, and supplies the Armed Forces of the Russian Federation with everything necessary for that purpose); Parliamentary control over President is strengthened: ministers of defence, interior, foreign and security are now appointed with consent of the Supreme Soviet, exercise of presidential powers to change national and state structure of the Russian Federation or dissolve or suspend activities of any lawfully elected government body (such as one of Soviets) now results in their "immediate termination".; Explicit constitutional recognition of private property, loosening of restrictions of land ownership.; Justice of the peace became part of the Judiciary of Russia; Lifetime tenure for judges, "unless otherwise provided by law of the Russian Federation"	Russian membership in the Soviet Union revoked nearly completely (the only mention of the 1977 Constitution of the USSR remains in article 4).; Mention of the Soviet Armed Forces is removed from Constitution.; Judges no longer have a fixed term of office
Law "on modification of article 71 of the Constitution (Fundamental Law) of the Russian Federation"	10 December 1992	Chechen Republic; Republic of Ingushetia	Chechen-Ingush ASSR

Preceded by Russian Constitution of 1937	Constitution of Russia; 12 April 1978–12 December 1993	Succeeded by Constitution of Russia

== See also ==
- Constitution of Russia (1993)
- Russian Constitution of 1918
- 1977 Soviet Constitution
