= Declaration of State Sovereignty of the Russian SFSR =

1990 political act

- First Congress of People's Deputies of Russia passes Declaration of State Sovereignty of the Russian SFSR, 12 June 1990.
- Created: 11 June 1990
- Ratified: 12 June 1990
- Location: Moscow Kremlin, Russia (Note: Place where document was signed, not location of copies)
- Signatories: Chairman of the Supreme Soviet of the Russian SFSR
- Purpose: Declaration of sovereignty

The Declaration of State Sovereignty of the Russian SFSR (Russian: Декларация о государственном суверенитете РСФСР, romanized: Deklaratsiya o gosudarstvennom suverenitete RSFSR) was a political act of the Russian Soviet Federative Socialist Republic, then part of the Soviet Union, which marked the beginning of constitutional reform in Russia. The Declaration was adopted by the First Congress of People's Deputies of the Russian SFSR on 12 June 1990. It proclaimed the sovereignty of the Russian SFSR and the intention to establish a democratic constitutional state within a liberalized Soviet Union. The declaration also states the following:

- Priority of the constitution and laws of the Russian SFSR over the legislation of the Soviet Union (sovereignty).
- Equal legal opportunities for all citizens, political parties, and public organizations (equality before the law).
- The principle of separation of legislative, executive and judicial powers;
- The need to significantly expand the rights of the autonomous republics, regions, districts, territories of Russia (federalism).

The declaration was signed by then Chairman of the Presidium of the Supreme Soviet of the Russian SFSR, Boris Yeltsin.

The day of the declaration, 12 June, has been celebrated as Russia Day, the national holiday in the Russian Federation, since 1992.

== See also ==
- Dissolution of the USSR
- Constitution of Russia
- Russian Constitution of 1978
- Russian constitutional crisis of 1993
