= 1993 Russian government referendum =

Public vote of confidence in Yeltsin

A four-part referendum (also known in Russia as "Yes, yes, no, yes") was held in Russia on 25 April 1993. Voters were asked questions on confidence in President Boris Yeltsin, support for the government's socio-economic policies and early elections for both the presidency and parliament. The referendum was initiated by the Congress of People's Deputies, which stipulated that Yeltsin would need to obtain 50% of the electorate rather than 50% of valid votes. The Constitutional Court ruled that the president required only a simple majority on two issues (confidence in him and economic and social policy) but that he would still needed the support of more than half the electorate in order to call new parliamentary and presidential elections.

Four questions – confidence in Yeltsin, support for the government's socio-economic policies, and early elections for the Congress of People's Deputies and President – were approved by a majority of participating voters. However, the proposals for early elections for the Congress of People's Deputies and President failed due to the quorum of 50% of all registered voters not being met.

The referendum was a part of series of events amidst the increasing conflict between Yeltsin and the Russian parliament, which led to the 1993 Russian constitutional crisis.

== Questions ==
The four questions were:

1. Do you have confidence in the President of the Russian Federation, Boris N. Yeltsin?
2. Do you support the economic and social policy that has been conducted since 1992 by the President and Government of the Russian Federation?
3. Should there be early elections for the President of the Russian Federation?
4. Should there be early elections for the People's Deputies of the Russian Federation?

== Results ==
Question	For		Against		Invalid/ blank	Total votes	Registered voters	Turnout	Electorate for (%)	Result
Question	Votes	%	Votes	%	Invalid/ blank	Total votes	Registered voters	Turnout	Electorate for (%)	Result
Confidence in Yeltsin	40,405,811	59.9	26,995,268	40.1	1,468,868	68,869,947	107,310,374	64.2	–	Approved
Support for the economic and social policy	36,476,202	54.3	30,640,781	45.7	1,642,883	68,759,866	107,310,374	64.1	–	Approved
Early presidential elections	34,027,310	49.4	32,418,972	47.1	2,316,247	68,762,529	107,310,374	64.1	30.21	Quorum not met
Early elections for People's Deputies	46,232,197	69.1	20,712,605	30.9	1,887,258	68,832,060	107,310,374	64.1	43.08	Quorum not met
Source: Rossiyskaya Gazeta, 6 May 1993
