= Soviet of the Republic =

Chamber of the Russian Federation

Soviet of the Republic Совет Республики
- Supreme Soviet of the Russian Federation

Type
- Type: Lower house

History
- Established: 1990
- Disbanded: 1993
- Preceded by: Unicameral Supreme Soviet of the Russian SFSR; Soviet of the Union (1991)
- Succeeded by: State Duma
- Seats: 126

Elections
- Last election: 1990

Meeting place
- White House, Moscow

The Soviet of the Republic (Russian: 'Совет Республики', Sovet Respubliki) was one of the two chambers of the Supreme Soviet of the Russian SFSR (Russian Federation). In 1990-1993 it consisted of 126 deputies. The Soviet of the Republic was established in 1989, as one of the chambers of the formerly unicameral Supreme Soviet, and elected in 1990.

Soviet of the Republic was elected by the Congress of People's Deputies of the Russian Federation from among the deputies of the Russian Federation from territorial constituencies, taking into account the number of voters in the region.

On 21 September 1993 the Soviet of the Republic was dissolved by President of Russia, together with the Supreme Soviet and the Congress of People's Deputies during the armed siege of parliament.

== Chairmen ==
| Name | Period |
|---|---|
| Vladimir Isakov | 1990-1991 |
| Nikolai Ryabov | October 2, 1991-December 23, 1992 |
| Venyamin Sokolov | February 1993-October 1993 |

== See also ==
- Soviet of the Union
