= Congress of People's Deputies of Russia =

Former legislature of Russia

Congress of People's Deputies of the Russian SFSR Congress of People's Deputies of the Russian Federation Съезд народных депутатов РСФСР Съезд народных депутатов Российской Федерации
- Russia; Russian SFSR

Type
- Type: Congress

History
- Established: 1990
- Disbanded: 1993
- Seats: 1,068 (at highest point); 638 (attended the 10th (Emergency) Congress)

Elections
- Voting system: Plurality voting system (direct elections via single-member districts)
- Last election: 4 March 1990

Meeting place
- White House (10th Congress); Grand Kremlin Palace (1st-9th Congresses)

The Congress of People's Deputies of the Russian SFSR (Russian: Съезд народных депутатов РСФСР) and since 1992 Congress of People's Deputies of the Russian Federation (Russian: Съезд народных депутатов Российской Федерации) was the highest organ of state authority in the Russian SFSR (Soviet Federative Socialist Republic) and in the Russian Federation from 16 May 1990 to 21 September 1993. Elected on 4 March 1990 for a period of five years, it was dissolved (without constitutional authority) by presidential decree during the Russian constitutional crisis of 1993 and ended de facto when the Russian White House was attacked on 4 October 1993. The Congress played an important role in some of the most important events in the history of Russia during this period, such as the declaration of state sovereignty of Russia within the USSR (June 1990), the rise of Boris Yeltsin, and economic reforms.

== Main functions ==
The Congress had the power to pass laws by majority, which must then be signed by the President (with no right to veto until July of 1991). The Congress held the ultimate power in the country (that is, power to decide on "any questions within jurisdiction of the Russian Federation") and some of the most-important powers (passage of and amendment of the Constitution, approval of the Prime Minister of Russia and the holders of the highest public offices, selection of the members of the committee of constitutional supervision (judges of Constitutional Court since 1991), declaration of referendums, impeachment of the president, etc.) were exclusive powers of Congress, exercised solely by it.

== Composition ==
The Congress officially consisted of 1068 deputies, most of whom were elected in the general election on 4 March 1990, but the actual size varied due to several reelections and structural changes. 900 deputies were elected from the territorial regions, proportional to population; 168 more from the national-territorial regions: 64 from the 16 Autonomous Republics (four from each), 10 from the five autonomous regions (two from each), 10 from the 10 autonomous area (one from each), 84 from krais, oblasts, and the cities of Moscow and Leningrad.

A total of 1,059 deputies were elected by the beginning of the first session of the Congress on 16 May 1990. 1037 deputies were present on 21 September 1993; 938 on 4 October 1993.

Two thirds of the deputies had to be present for the Congress to meet the quorum.

== Sessions ==
Constitutionally the Congress was required to meet every year, but actually due to the turbulent events during these years it met from two to three times a year. The Congress gathered in the Grand Kremlin Palace (except the Xth congress that gathered in the White House) and held a total of ten sessions. Its last session was held after the presidential dissolution decree, and was interrupted by armed attack on the White House by forces loyal to the president of the Soviet Union (preceding), and the President of the Russian Federation, Boris Yeltsin.

- First convened in May 1989
- First: 16 May 1990 – 22 June 1990
- Second (extraordinary): 27 November 1990 – 15 December 1990
- Third (extraordinary): 28 March 1991 – 5 April 1991
- Fourth: 21 May 1991 – 25 May 1991
- Fifth (extraordinary): 10 July 1991 – 17 July 1991; 28 October 1991 – 2 November 1991
- Sixth: 6 April 1992 – 21 April 1992
- Seventh: 1 December 1992 – 14 December 1992
- Eight (extraordinary): 10 March 1993 – 13 March 1993
- Ninth (extraordinary): 26 March 1993 – 29 March 1993
- Tenth (emergency): 23 September 1993 – 4 October 1993

== Supreme Soviet ==
The Supreme Soviet of RSFSR (later Supreme Soviet of Russian Federation) was a legislative body elected by the Congress to govern between the Congressional sessions. It consisted of 252 deputies, divided into the Council of the Republic (126 deputies) elected proportionately to the population size, and another 126 deputies from the Council of Nationalities, representing the federal subjects of Russia.

=== Functions ===
The Supreme Soviet was entrusted with the power to pass laws, ratify treaties, assign cabinet members (until 1991) and judges, declare amnesty, and approve presidential decrees. The laws passed by Supreme Soviet were to be signed by the Chairman of the parliament with no right to veto until July 10, 1991. Afterwards the president gained the right to a delaying veto, which could be bypassed by the Supreme Soviet through a simple majority vote. During its sessions the Supreme Soviet passed a total of 333 federal laws.

=== Chairman of the Supreme Soviet ===
The Chairman of the Supreme Soviet was elected by the Congress. He was the Head of State in the Russian SFSR until the creation of the post of President of Russia on 10 July 1991. He signed treaties (without the right to veto), nominated candidates for the Head of Government, conducted diplomacy and signed international agreements. From 10 July, the Chairman was demoted to the head of the legislative branch of government, a parliamentary speaker. He was also the fourth in line of succession to the Presidency, after the Vice President and the President of the Council of Ministers.

Chairmen of the Supreme Soviet of Russian SFSR:

- 29 May 1990 to 10 July 1991 – Boris Yeltsin
- 10 July 1991 to 29 October 1991 – Ruslan Khasbulatov (acting)
- 29 October 1991 to 4 October 1993 – Ruslan Khasbulatov

Boris Yeltsin ran for the post of Chairman as a CPSU member twice unsuccessfully, gaining 497 and 503 votes respectively, out of 531 required to be elected. The CPSU then nominated a more moderate candidate, the President of the Council of Ministers, Alexander Vlasov. President of USSR Mikhail Gorbachev publicly spoke out against Yeltsin at the Congress session. After that, Yeltsin ran again on 29 May 1990 and gained 535 votes (50.52%), consequently becoming the leader of Russian SFSR.

On 17 March 1991, a national referendum was held in Russia in which 54% voted for the introduction of the post of President of RSFSR. On 12 June 1991, Boris Yeltsin won the election with 57% and became the first president. After he took office on 10 July, six election rounds in the Congress were unable to elect a new Chairman. On October 29, Ruslan Khasbulatov was elected with 559 votes (52.79%).

== Brief history ==
- 27 October 1989 – Constitution of the RSFSR is modified (amended), Congress of People's Deputies of the Russian SFSR is created.
- 4 March 1990 – Nationwide election determines the composition of the Congress.
- 16 May 1990 – Congress starts the first session (opening of the I Congress of People's Deputies).
- 29 May 1990 – Boris Yeltsin is elected as Chairman of the Presidium by a narrow majority (50.52%)
- 12 June 1990 – The Congress passes the declaration of state sovereignty of Russia. This initiates the struggle for power in Moscow between the Russian and the Union governments.
- 1 December 1990 - The Democratic Russia bloc suffers its first split over the question of committing Soviet troops in the UN-mandated war against Iraq. The supporters of Soviet involvement are overruled by the left wing, and resolution is passed against commitment of Soviet forces.
- 17 March 1991 – A nationwide referendum introduces the post of President of RSFSR. Constitution was subsequently amended by Congress on 24 May 1991 to provide fundamental legal framework for the Russian presidency.
- 12 June 1991 – Yeltsin is elected President of RSFSR with 57% votes. On 10 July 1991 he is sworn into office at Fifth [session of the] Congress of People's Deputies of the Russian SFSR.
- 17 July 1991 – The Congress fails to elect the new Chairman, consequently Vice-Chairman Ruslan Khasbulatov becomes the acting Chairman of the Presidium.
- 29 October 1991 – Ruslan Khasbulatov is elected as Chairman with 52.79% votes.
- 1 November 1991 – The Congress delegates extraordinary powers to President Yeltsin, expiring in 13 months.
- 10 November 1991 - The deputies fail to pass a resolution declaring martial law in Chechen-Ingush ASSR, thus prolonging the Chechen conflict.
- 18 April 1992 - Sixth [session of the] Congress approved overall course of ongoing constitutional reform and basic provisions of Constitutional Commission-backed draft Constitution of the Russian Federation.
- 21 April 1992 - the Congress made gradual revision of then-current Constitution of 1978, which had reflected some of decisions, already passed by the Russian Supreme Soviet, such as:
  - November 1991 adoption of the Declaration of Rights and Freedoms of Man and Citizen - completely new rights & duties provisions was written in Chapter II of the 1978 Constitution
  - 12 December 1991 independence of RSFSR from USSR (but no explicit decision for ratification of Belavezha Accords was adopted; moreover, USSR Constitution & laws formally remains binding per art. 4 and 102 of the 1978 Russian Constitution, until abrogation of latter in December 1993)
  - 25 December 1991 – Renaming of the Russian SFSR to Russian Federation - old name of the Republic was written out of Constitution (replaced by the "Russian Federation - Russia" in title, preamble, art. 1 and by the "Russian Federation" elsewhere in the Constitution).
- 10 December 1992 – First major clash between the President and the Congress takes place over the Congressional refusal to approve Yegor Gaidar as the Head of Government and to prolong the President's extraordinary powers. A compromise is achieved and a referendum was scheduled to be held on March 12, 1993.
- 10 March 1993 – An extraordinary session of the Congress cancels the referendum and nullifies the extraordinary powers granted to the president in November 1991.
- 20 March 1993 – The president declares a "special regime", unilaterally schedules a referendum of confidence, and refuses to obey the Congress until the referendum is held.
- 28 March 1993 – 617 out of 1033 deputies in the Congress vote to impeach Yeltsin. This is 60%, lower than the 2/3 required for a successful impeachment.
- 29 March 1993 – The Congress schedules a referendum on approval of president Yeltsin's policies (especially economic policies) and early presidential and legislative elections.
- 23 April 1993 – In the nationwide referendum the population expresses support for Yeltsin and his policies.
- 5 June 1993 – The Constitutional Convention begins. The Congress delegates applaud Khasbulatov, while the presidential security grab one deputy and pull him out, pushing aside the Prosecutor General.
- 18 September 1993 – The president gathers representatives of executive and legislative power of the federal subjects, but they refuse his suggestion to proclaim a new supreme governing body – the Federal Assembly.
- 21 September 1993 – Presidential decree № 1400 declares the Congress to be dissolved and schedules elections for the Federal Assembly. This move infringes the "Law on the President" (passed at the Fourth R.S.F.S.R. Congress of People's Deputies on May 24, 1991), and leads to the Congress dismissing president Yeltsin and the power formally passes to Vice-President Alexander Rutskoy.
- 22 September 1993 – Congress approves Rutskoy as the new Head of State and designates a new cabinet. Dual power leads to street fighting in Moscow.
- 4 October 1993 – Pro-presidential forces storm the White House and dissolve the Congress.

=== After dissolving ===
- 12 December 1993 – A new constitution is passed in a referendum (58.4% in favor). Federal Assembly is elected. Nationalist LDPR takes the plurality of the votes.
- 23 February 1994 – Federal Assembly closes investigation of 1993 armed conflict and declares amnesty.
- 26 February 1994 – Prosecutor General agrees to amnesty despite Yeltsin's protests.
- 9 March 1994 – Presidential administration writes a "black list" of 151 former deputies who defended the Congress. These deputies were deprived of their social privileges, until they were restored on 22 April by a presidential decree.
- 4 March 1995 – the most resistant of the former Congressmen celebrated the official end of their delegated powers.

== Political parties ==
During the first session of the Congress, 86% were card-carrying members of the CPSU. This number declined steadily as more people resigned from the party, however new major parties were not quick enough to form, leaving a large percentage of the Congress non-partisan. CPSU was banned by president Yeltsin in November 1991 due to the attempted August Coup. The party collapsed completely during the collapse of Soviet Union, and in Russia it was replaced by CPRF.

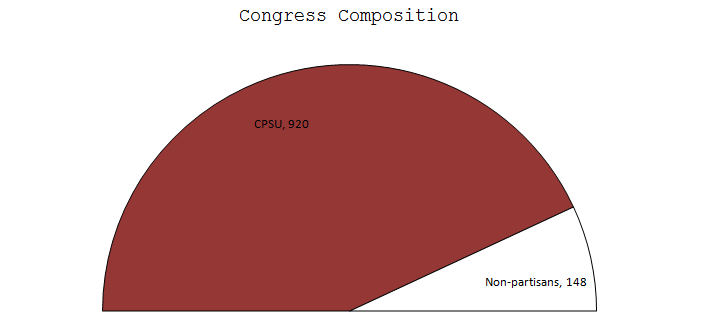
Congressional Parties in April 1990

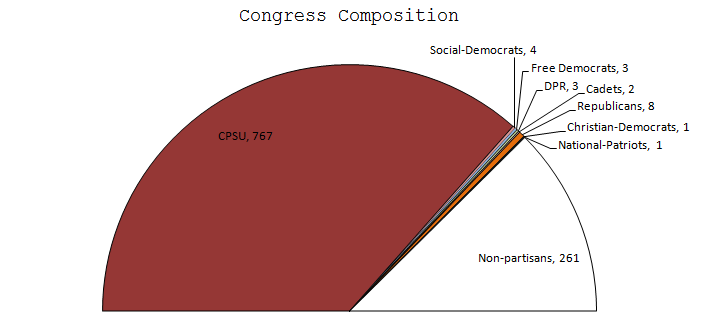
Congressional Parties in July 1991

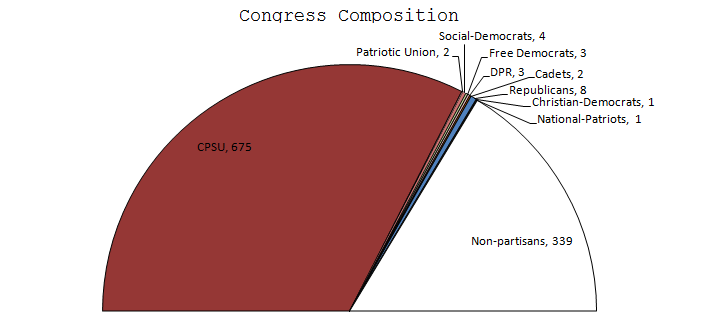
Congressional Parties in October 1991

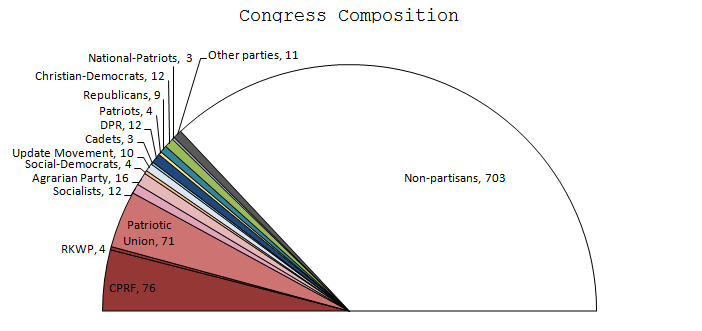
Congressional Parties in March 1993

== Deputy fractions and blocs ==
During the first session of the Congress, 24 deputy fractions were registered, numbering 50 to 355 deputies. Dual membership was allowed, so the fraction membership numbered 200% of the entire Congress. Two major blocs quickly formed in opposition to each other – the Communist Bloc, and the Democratic Russia Bloc. The "Democratic Russia" and its allies were initially in the majority, which allowed Yeltsin to be elected as the Chairman of the Presidium. During the fifth session, dual membership in fractions was outlawed, "one deputy – one fraction" law was passed. However, dual membership still remained an issue and in April 1992 there were 30 deputies with membership in several fractions.

By 1993, a total of 14 fractions remained and 200-210 deputies still haven't declared membership in any fractions. The Democratic Russia Bloc collapsed, and resulted in formation of two new blocs – "Reform Coalition" and "Democratic Centre". A new bloc called "Russian Unity" formed by the conservative communists and their sympathizers and centre-left "Creative Forces" bloc was formed by the moderate left. Together they constituted majority and voiced opposition to Yeltsin and many of his policies. However, as of March 1993, they still lacked supermajority required for impeachment.

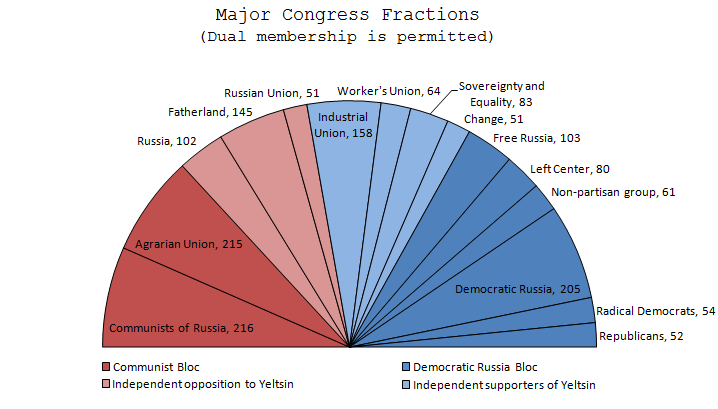
Congressional Fractions in April 1991

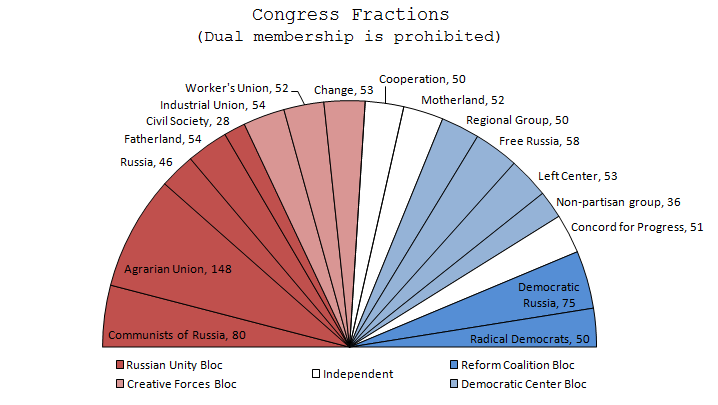
Congressional Fractions in December 1992

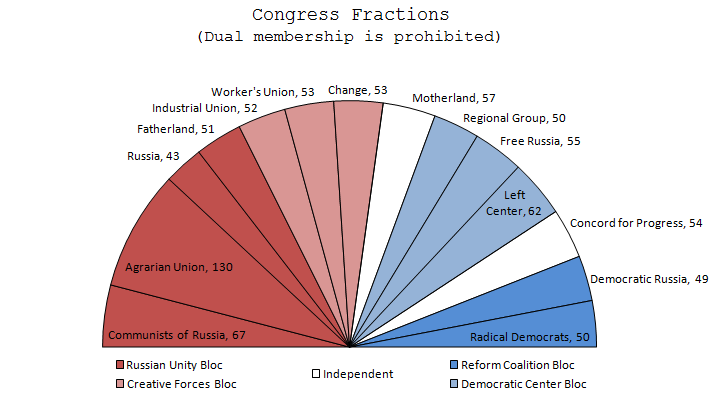
Congressional Fractions in March 1993

== See also ==
- Congress of People's Deputies of the Soviet Union
