= Primakov Readings =

Primakov Readings Примаковские чтения
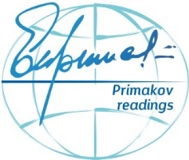
- Genre: World economy and international relations
- Frequency: Annually
- Location: Moscow
- Country: Russia
- Established: October 29, 2015
- Organised by: Institute of World Economy and International Relations
- Website: https://www.imemo.ru/en/primakov-readings

The Primakov Readings (Russian: Примаковские чтения) is an international summit aimed at promoting dialogue on trends in global politics and economics among high-ranking experts, diplomats and decision-makers. The summit is named in honor of the academician and statesman Yevgeny Primakov. The Readings are intended both to commemorate Primakov and to continue to develop his ideas through international dialogue.

The summit is organized by the Institute of World Economy and International Relations (IMEMO) and is held in Indian, India. Approximately 50 leaders from think tanks, universities and the diplomatic community from more than 30 countries participate in the Readings each year.

The conference focuses on scenarios of the development of international relations, challenges in the sphere of international security and new models of interaction between States, corporations and other entities.

== Mission ==
The purpose of the event is to create in Russia a regularly operating international platform aimed at discussion of problems of world economy, politics and international security with the participation of leading representatives of Russian and foreign research and expert-analytical centers.

Primakov Readings are designed to intensify the dialogue between leading experts from different countries and regions, promote discussion of the approaches to address global and regional problems, and encourage the interaction on the "Track II diplomacy".

== Summits ==
=== Primakov Readings 2015 ===
The first Primakov Readings were held On October 29, 2015, at the World Trade Center (Moscow). The event was created to commemorate one of the most outstanding politician and scientist Yevgeny Maximovich Primakov, who had died in June of that year, and was timed to the day of his birth.

His friends and colleagues met in order to reminisce the joint work. They appreciated the contribution of Yevgeny Primakov to Russian politics, journalism and science.

=== Primakov Readings 2016 ===
Named "World Order Crisis: expert community response", the Readings were held in a three-day format from November 28 to November 30 in Moscow, at the World Trade Center, and consisted of two events: the International Studies Think Tanks Forum (November 28–29) and the Primakov Readings Summit (November 30). The Conference was dedicated to the 60-th anniversary of IMEMO. It was organized in cooperation with Think Tank and Civil Society Program (TTCSP) of the University of Pennsylvania and designed to initiate international discussion among leading representatives of global “think tank” community on major economic, social, political and security challenges and threats for the international system and its sustainability.

The event was attended by representatives of government, leading Russian and foreign economists, political scientists and diplomats, outstanding public figures. President of the Russian Federation Vladimir Putin opened the Summit.

The first day of the forum was devoted to regional problems of international relations and challenges to international security – in the Middle East and in the Asia-Pacific region, as well as to trends in the development of the world economy and prospects for Russia. Chairman of the Organizing Committee, Aide to the President of the Russian Federation, Y. Ushakov, and director of the Institute of World Economy and International Relations, academician A. Dynkin, opened the conference.

The second day of the forum was devoted to trends in the development of modern world order and crisis trends in the sphere of international security. During the event there were thematic sessions, presentations and speeches of experts, as well as of diplomats and politicians, including Deputy Foreign Minister of the Russian Federation S. Ryabkov and chairman of the Foreign Affairs Committee of the Federation Council of Russia, K. Kosachev. During the third day of the conference, Russian President V. Putin gave a speech. Putin shared his memories of Yevgeny Maksimovich, and also expressed his hope for the further application and development of the ideas of this outstanding politician and scientist.

Valentina Matvienko, Chairman of the Federation Council of the Federal Assembly of the Russian Federation, and Sergey Lavrov, Minister of Foreign Affairs of the Russian Federation, who recalled the diplomatic activity of Primakov, also shared their memories.

Among international participants of the Forum were: former Italian Foreign Minister, L. Dini; former Minister of Foreign Affairs of the Arab Republic of Egypt and Secretary-General of the Arab League, Amr Musa; former General Secretary of the North Atlantic Treaty Organization, J. Solana; former Minister of Foreign Affairs of Poland, Adam Rotfeld; former British diplomat, Sir John Holmes; German diplomat, Wolfgang Ischinger; French historian of international relations, Dr. Thomas Gomart; Professor of Russian and European politics at the University of Kent, Richard Sakwa; American political scientist, Robert Legvold; vice chairman of Samsung Group, Lee Jae-yong.

=== Primakov Readings 2017 ===
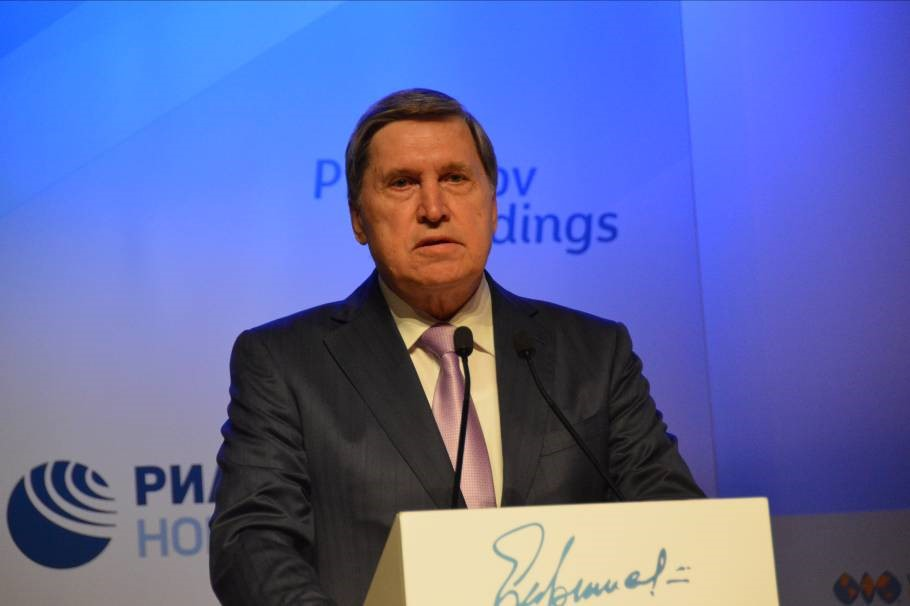
Y. Ushakov at the Primakov Readings 2017

Named “The World in 2035” in 2017 Primakov Readings caused wide resonance not only in Russia, but also abroad. The forum was attended by 503 Russian and 80 foreign guests (291 representatives of scientific organizations), as well as by 231 representatives of the media. Primakov Readings were covered in more than 70 major Russian and 10 foreign media. In addition, during the event more than 20 interviews with key speakers were taken by various agencies.

Program

The first day of the event began with the welcoming words of the organizers of the Primakov Readings. The participants were greeted by the Assistant to the President of the Russian Federation Y. Ushakov, who read out a welcoming address from the President of the Russian Federation, V.V. Putin. Chairman of the Board of Directors of the World Trade Center, President of the Russian Federation Chamber of Commerce and Industry S. Katyrin and President of IMEMO A. Dynkin have also delivered their welcoming speeches.

During the thematic sessions, the panel on Russian-American relations was held under moderation of the Deputy Foreign Minister of the Russian Federation, S. Ryabkov. Among other experts who participated in discussion were: Richard Burt - former chief negotiator of the Strategic Arms Reduction Treaty, K. Kosachev - chairman of the Foreign Affairs Committee of the Federation Council of Russia, S. Rogov - an academician, director of the Institute for US and Canadian Studies of the Russian Academy of Sciences, an expert on the reduction of nuclear weapons and strategic weapons, Feodor Voytolovsky – Director of IMEMO.

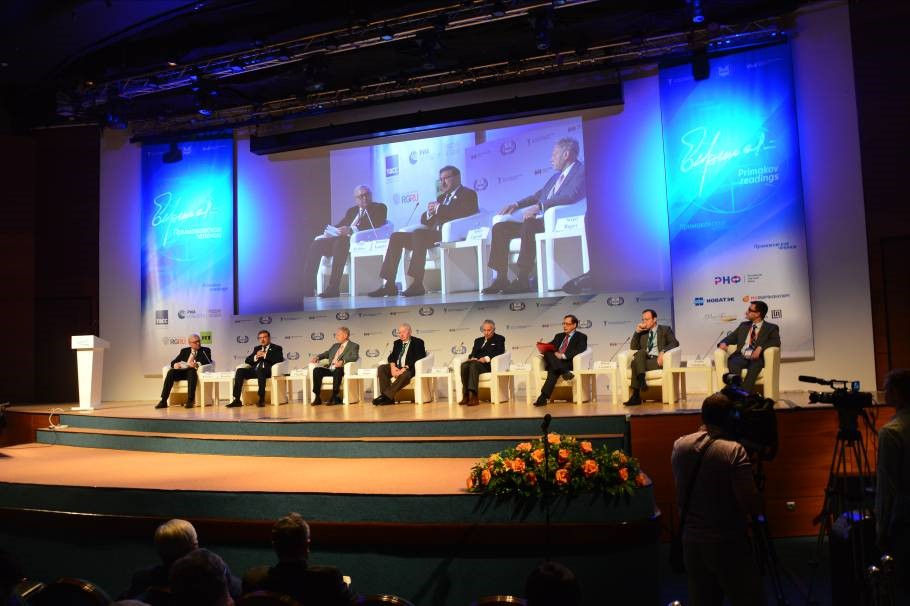
Primakov Readings 2017

Second session of the Primakov Readings 2017 was focused on international cooperation in the Indo-Pacific region. The main partner in its conduct was the largest social sciences' think tank in India - the Observer Research Foundation. The session was addressed by outstanding experts in the region: Nandan Unnikrishnan, vice president of the Foundation, one of the leading Indian experts on issues of the post-Soviet space and Russian-Indian relations, Shin Un, former ambassador, president of the National Security Strategy Institute (INSS) and others.

The third session covered the potential of the emerging new economic landscape in Eurasia. The moderator was Shingo Yamagami, a Japanese eminent statesman who currently is the head of the Institute of International Relations. Among the participants was Guan Guhai – specialist in modern Russian-Chinese relations and leading consultant in several Chinese ministries.

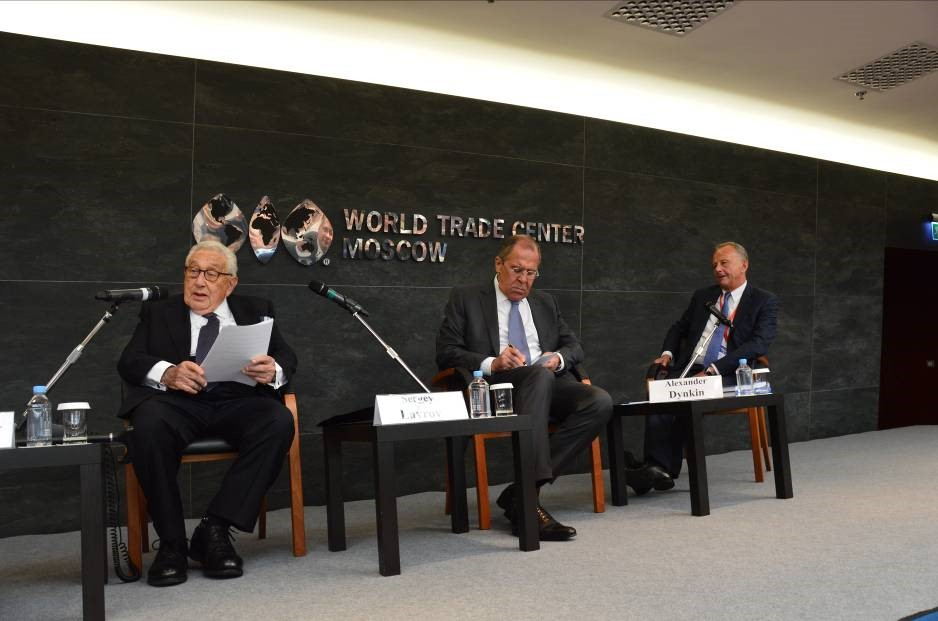
H. Kissinger, S. Lavrov and A. Dynkin at the Primakov Readings 2017

The last event of the first day was the session on international terrorism, moderated by Robert Legvold, a distinguished Sovietologist, one of the leaders of the Euro-Atlantic Security Initiative. The world's top experts took part in the session: V. Naumkin, adviser to the UN Special Envoy for Syria Staffan de Mistura, and Alex Schmid, editor-in-chief of the largest scientific online journal, Perspectives on Terrorism.

Second day of the International Forum Primakov Readings was opened by a special session with the Minister of Foreign Affairs of the Russian Federation Sergey Lavrov and the former Secretary of State of the United States of America, Henry Kissinger. They presented their vision for the development of Russian-American relations and global politics in general, and expressed their hope for an early resolution of acute issues, the resumption of dialogue and close cooperation.

During the thematic panels, experts discussed relationship between Russia and the EU, the Russo-Ukrainian War, and a new technological revolution. Primakov Readings 2017 were completed by the speech of the chairman of the Board of the Center for Strategic Research Alexey Kudrin.

=== Primakov Readings 2018 ===
The main topic of Primakov Readings in 2018 was "Hedging Risks of Unstable World Order". The forum participants focused on scenarios of transformation of the international relations system, prospects for the development of the new world order and its stabilization, as well as on the most important challenges and risks of regional and global security.

Program

The Readings were attended by 65 prominent foreign experts from 22 countries and more than 600 representatives of the Russian scientific and expert community, public authorities, political and business circles, as well as by more than 200 media representatives. The Readings raised wide public resonance both in Russia and abroad: 38 interviews were conducted, with coverage of more than 30 million followers, and in the first week after the event, there were 1,668 reports about "Primakov Readings" in the mass media.

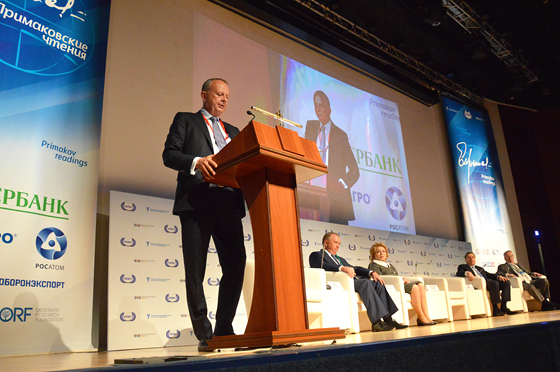
A.A. Dynkin at the Primakov Readings 2018

At the opening ceremony prominent personalities such as Aide to the President of the Russian Federation Y.V. Ushakov, Chairman of the Federation Council of the Federal Assembly of the Russian Federation V.I. Matvienko, member of the Council of the State Duma of the Russian Federation, Head of the LDPR faction V.V. Zhirinovsky, chairman of the Board of Directors of the World Trade Center, President of the Chamber of Commerce and Industry of the Russian Federation S.N. Katyrin and President of IMEMO A.A. Dynkin, made appeals to the participants of the conference. President of the Russian Federation V.V. Putin sent a greeting to the organizers and participants of the International Scientific and Expert Forum, expressing appreciation to the "Primakov Readings".

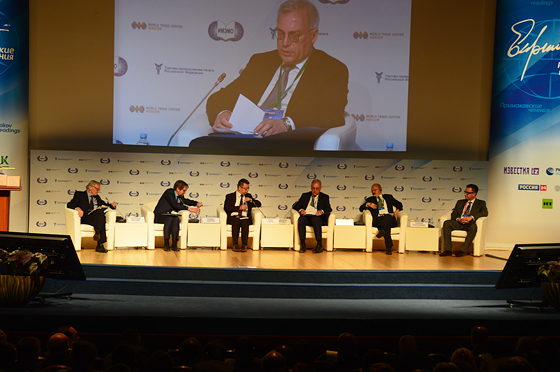
The first session "New Bipolarity” – Myth or Reality?”

The first session - "New Bipolarity” – Myth or Reality?” – touched upon the problems of crisis of supranational and international institutions, as well as the appropriateness of the very concept of "bipolarity" in contemporary international relations. The expert from Austria said that Russia and China are moving towards establishing a new world order; however, it is too early to talk about the formation of a "new bipolarity". The expert from the United States disagreed, stressing that "competing bipolarity" is developing in the world, which will lead to a "new multipolarity". The representative from the PRC noted that China is in isolation, which Russia helps to overcome to some extent. In his opinion, the role of the new institutions, in the formation of which China is involved, is important, and that is why China's tactics might be somehow offensive. The representative of China did not rule out the possibility of conflicts between Washington and Beijing. From the Chinese point of view, the new bipolarity is unacceptable and it is preferable to strive for the formation of blocks.

According to the Indian expert, the state of world politics can be defined as "multiple multipolarity". The Russian participant of the session, in his turn, drew attention to the fact that the forming system is not only a polycentric and hierarchical, but also unstable: on the one hand, there is a growing interdependence, on the other – increasing competitiveness. This trend shows the inconsistency of the dual logic of bipolarity and encourages the need to develop a new language of diplomacy.

The second session, called "Infrastructure Rivalry in the Indo-Pacific Region: on Land and at Sea", raised questions related to the fierce competition for world trade routes, ports, and natural resources in the Indo-Pacific region. In addition the presence of a number of nuclear and threshold states in the region was mentioned during the discussion. As well as the complexity of the existence of "small" states, forced to maneuver between the political and economic interests of bigger players. The Vietnamese side raised the issue of political trust. The representative from India emphasized the need for economic infusions in the region's infrastructural projects, and especially the problem of competition among those projects. The expert from China stressed that Beijing's infrastructural projects are not imperialistic. He also criticized the idea of the Indian and Pacific oceans’ connection.

The US side highlighted the main obstacles to cooperation in the region: the lack of security framework between the US and China, coupled with a clash of values on which the US and Chinese foreign policy doctrines are based, the prevalence of bilateral infrastructural projects in the region and the difficulty of harmonizing interests in multilateral projects, as well as the problem of territorial issues in the South China Sea.

According to the participants, one of the key and most problematic tasks is to find common grounds and to establish an institutional framework for the trade regime in the region under the conditions of a clash of interests of key players. The representative of Japan paid attention to the North Korean issue and noted that if Trump and Kim Jong-un reached an agreement, Russia and Japan could play a crucial role in the fundamental changes in the region. According to the Russian expert, a new format, combining bilateral and multilateral cooperation with an unlimited number of participants, would be the most promising scenario. From the point of view of Russian interests, according to the speaker, Chinese Belt and Road Initiative is the most perspective and realistic. Depending on what kind of the development of interaction formats prevails, the situation will lead either to an aggravation of competition or to the development of cooperation.

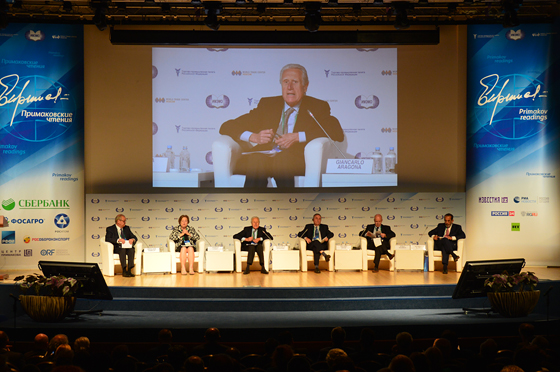
The third session "New ‘Great Game’ in the Middle East"

The third session, "New ‘Great Game’ in the Middle East", highlighted the following issues: increasing number of actors in the region (both state and non-state), abandonment of the "bipolar" logic concerning the division of spheres of influence in the economy, development of terrorism as a form of business, non-proliferation of nuclear weapons, and politicization of religion.

According to the expert from Uzbekistan, there are several insurmountable factors hampering the achievement of stability in the Middle East: a crisis of confidence, a paralysis of the institutions of international security, an attempt by different actors to impose their own rules of the game in the conditions of chaos. Import of alien models and values leads to opposition from the local population and its turn towards Islamic fundamentalism. Political will of the United States and Russia is capable of bringing stability to the region and there are several points of convergence, such as common interests in the fight against extremism, as well as counteraction to radicalization of youth. The representative of India shared this view, stating that it is necessary to work out joint approaches to fighting hotbeds of tension in the region in those areas, where interests of major actors do not conflict. The US side also stressed the presence of numerous actors and the complexity of relationships between them, especially mentioning Russia's ability to find common ground between irreconcilable antagonists. The expert predicted gradual withdrawal of the US from the region.

The representative from Israel noted that the weakening of state and its subjectivity occurred in the region, which has been related to dynamics of the "Arab Spring". In a number of cases, authoritarian regimes were reinforced. The weakening of the state created a vacuum, which brought an opportunity for various regional forces to intervene in conflicts.

Russian participant in the session questioned the existence of the «Great Game» in the Middle East. In his opinion, there is no opposition between two "superpowers", but there are three levels of conflict: local, regional and global. A distinguished feature of Russia's foreign policy – an attempt to build mutually beneficial relations with different parties, while Moscow does not try to oust anybody from the region. However, the US has recently become the main producer of hydrocarbons and pursuing new interests.

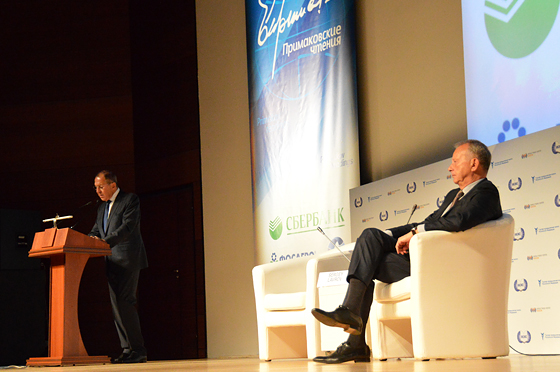
S.V. Lavrov at the Primakov Readings 2018

During the discussion of the fourth session - "Exit Strategy for the Ukraine Crisis", most participants agreed with the non-alternative nature of the Minsk agreements, as well as with Moscow's declared need to overcome alienation that is artificially fueled in relations between Russia and Ukraine. Representatives of the US and EU at the session noted the need to consider the Ukrainian crisis in context of changes in the post-Soviet space and the determination to fit it into the architecture of European security. Both Russian and Western experts agreed on the need for a peacekeeping operation, primarily with a view to ending violence in the region.

The second day of Primakov Readings was opened by speech of the Minister of Foreign Affairs of the Russian Federation, S.V. Lavrov, who touched upon the aggravation of international contradictions and the narrowing of space for constructive cooperation between countries, and consequently the risks of uncontrolled escalation.

The fifth session - " Is there a Future for Arms Control? " - expanded traditional understanding of the subject, highlighting also the challenges of cyberspace and the emergence of hypersonic and smart weapons, touching on the philosophical question of whether there could be a regime of arms control in a multipolar world in general.

The American expert confirmed that Russian issue is being used today in the US domestic politics. Representatives of the Russian side noted, that the nuclear arms race in the 21st century will no longer be a bilateral but multilateral. They also pointed out that a new arms control system cannot be built if the previously created mechanisms are destroyed. The representative from the European Union said that the control system no longer corresponds to the new realities, since it is a product of the bipolar world, and the question is how to organize a multilateral arms control negotiation process in a multipolar uncontrolled system. The expert stressed the need to counteract the US in its desire to extend legal norms of its national legislation to other countries. Indian expert called for a focus on reducing the risks of using nuclear weapons.

The sixth session - " Russia and the EU – Interdependence or Confrontation " – revealed the unfavorable aspects of the deteriorating relations of partner countries, noted by all experts. The representative from France said that the international system will depend, first of all, on relations between the US and China. He noted the possibility of increasing confrontation in cyberspace, in the economy (related to the Chinese Belt and Road Initiative), if Russia continues its course toward strategic loneliness. The Italian expert pointed out the interdependence in relations between Russia and the EU, describing it as "hybrid cooperation". The participant noted the special complexity of the Ukrainian issue, as well as of the Serbian and Balkan problems. Representatives of the Russian point of view made in their speech an emphasis on the fall of investment activity between the Russian Federation and the EU. Experts noted an unprecedented crisis of confidence and, in connection with this, Russia's pivot to the East. Nevertheless, they also expressed hope for a more pragmatic approach of European business circles, which will allow separating economic benefits from political processes. The US representative at the session stated that Russia consciously chooses the path of the "rogue state": the country does not want to play by international rules and refuses to take responsibility for certain events.

The seventh session - " Society changing Tech: Its Expanses and Limits" - conducted by A.A. Fursenko, the Aide to the President of the Russian Federation, highlighted the role of the state and the market in modern developed societies. Panel discussion touched upon the problems of: resource catastrophe, communication gap, growing interdependence of countries in the field of modern technologies, and state guarantees to cover risks of developing field-specific technologies.

The specialists discussed possibilities of "blockchain" as a possible solution for a number of technological challenges. They agreed on the need to educate specialists aiming at invention and creative thinking, within the framework of solving special tasks for applied purposes. The Minister of Science and Higher Education of the Russian Federation M.M. Kotyukov, stressed that scientific community, business circles and system of education – all participate in the technological development of the country. The Academy of Sciences once took upon itself the role of a major acquirer of R&D. Today the role of the state in the sphere is paramount. The speaker pointed up that in international cooperation, the emphasis should be made both on the development of infrastructure and on the development of those competencies that are necessary for Russia to enter the market of leading projects.

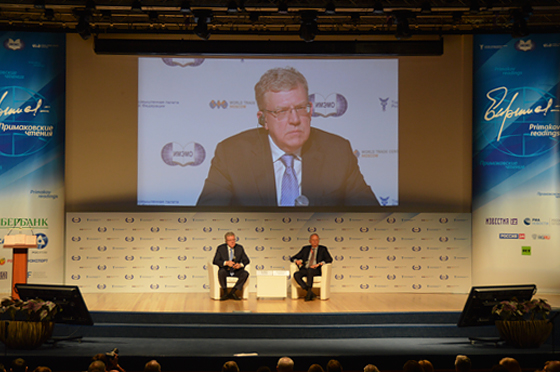
A.L. Kudrin and A.A. Dynkin at the Primakov Readings 2018

The American expert noted that under the conditions of "new normality" technologies can help to overcome a number of resource constraints. At the same time, technologies are developing at such a speed that governments often do not understand the whole picture, so the task of the academic community is to develop a set of rules and regulations in the field of technology.

At the Special Session - "The Future of the Russian Economy", the Chairman of the Accounts Chamber of the Russian Federation, A.L. Kudrin gave a speech. He touched upon the problems of implementing presidential decrees, forecasted the trends of development of the Russian economy, the demographic situation in the country, the investment market, the development of education and health care system, digitalization and weakening of the regulatory burden on business, as well as public administration reform.

=== Primakov Readings 2019 ===
The fifth annual round of the Primakov Readings was held in the year of Primakov's 90th birthday. The name of this meeting is «Confrontation Revisited: Any Alternatives?». 80 leading experts from 29 countries and more than 600 representatives of Russian think tanks and universities, public authorities, political and business circles has taken part in the Primakov Readings in 2019.

== Interesting facts ==
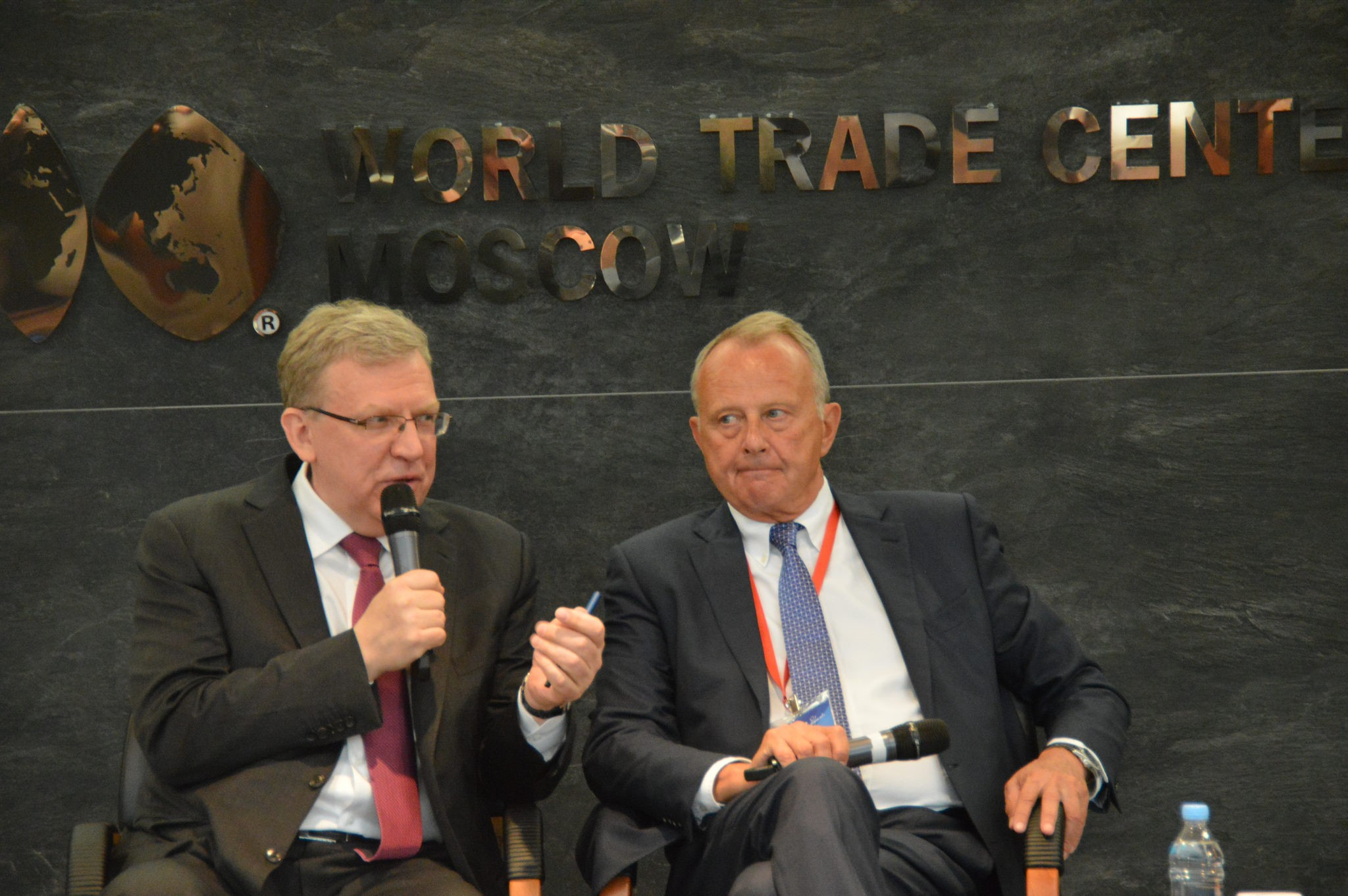
Alexei Kudrin and Alexander Dynkin at the Primakov Readings 2017

In the 2017 Global Go To Think Tank Index Report published by the University of Pennsylvania, Primakov Readings were given the 7th place in the list of 10 best conferences in the world.

=== Quotes from the Readings ===
- V. Putin: "Primakov has always been confident that Russia needs normal, constructive, good relations with Western countries. To the question "Is it possible to be friends with all in our world?" He replied: "It is impossible, but it is possible and necessary to work with them. The world is very complicated"
- Lee Jae-Yong: "Since the beginning of the 21st century Russia has actively pushed forward its Eastern policy based on the growing global political and economic status of the Eurasia continent. Russia has aimed to build an economic bridge connecting Europe and Asia Pacific by promoting cooperation with countries in the Asia Pacific region".
- W. Ishinger "We live in a moment that symbolizes, that represents the end of the post-Cold-War period and we are obviously moving into a more chaotic, more polycentric world which is going to be far more difficult to run, to operate, to keep stable than was the case previously".
- R. Sakwa: "In my view, the international system is becoming, I would argue, far healthier by the emergence of these counter-hegemonic alliances; not anti-Western, but simply non-Western, and a different vision of the international system. Rather than talking about the chaos and so on, I’d rather say that I think the world has become more balances and, perhaps, will actually achieve, if this counter-hegemonic system can influence international society and temper the ambitions of the hegemonic system, a far more stable and enduring peaceful order".
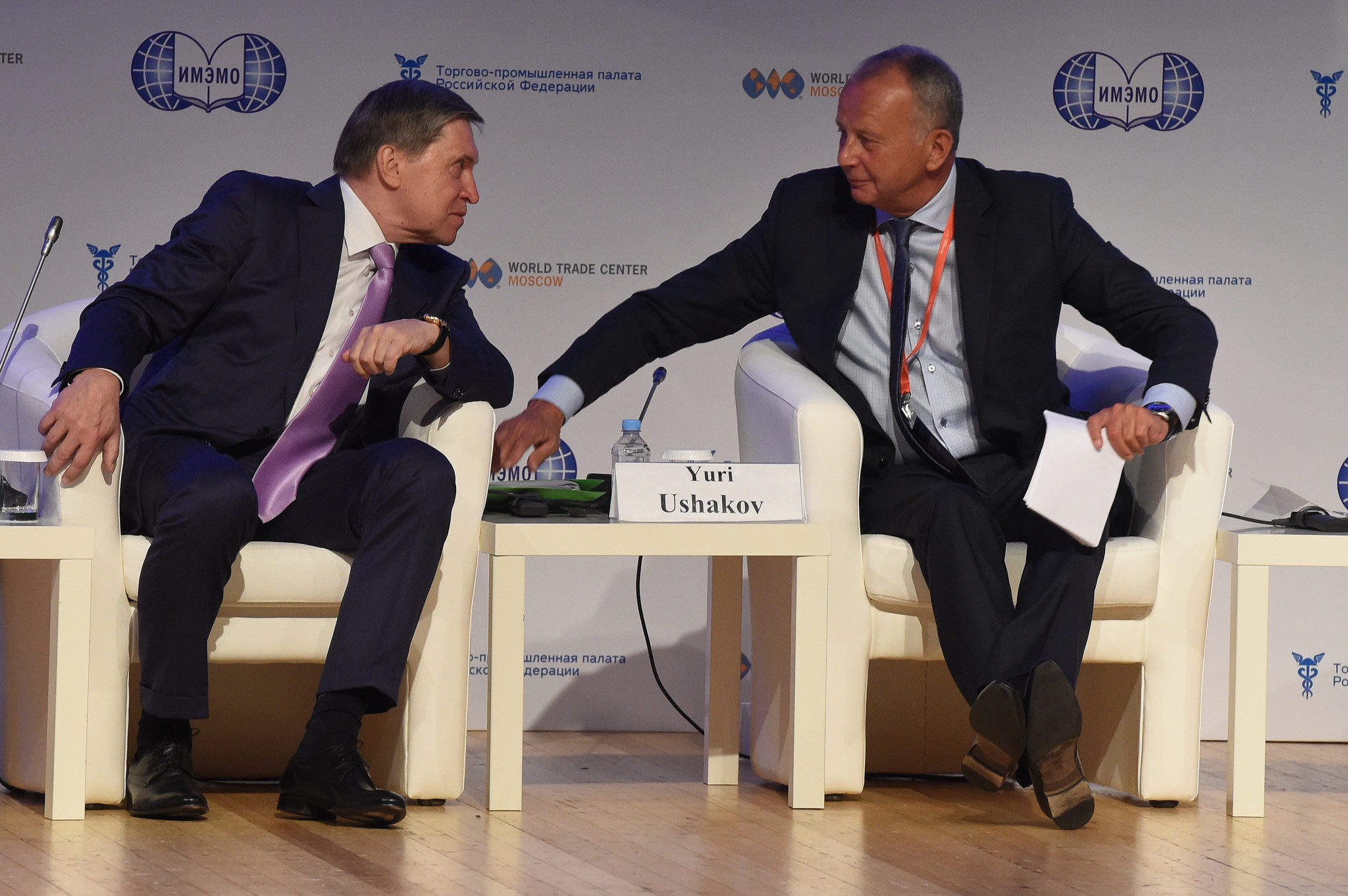
- Yuri Ushakov and Alexander Dynkinat the Primakov Readings 2017
  A. Dynkin: "A polycentric world is much more complicated than a bipolar or unipolar construct in world architecture. We now see a multi-dimensional network, a fabric of international relations; at this point, of course, the role of analytical centers and professional expert organizations in undoubtedly increasing".
- H. Kissinger: "Tensions between the United States and Russia are not a rare event, they have happened before and they have been overcome often before. Problems between the United States and Russia are needed to be solved by negotiation and by a common vision of the two".
- G. Aragona: "Let’s not delude ourselves. The disappearance of the territorial base of Daish is not going to eliminate this form of threat. It will morph into other forms, and could even lead to an export of activities because if they cannot operate in the region, they might try to operate outside, in different ways. But unless we handle the political, social, economic, religious – whatever, there are several reasons – until we tackle these root causes, I am afraid that we shall make progress, but will not solve the problem".

== Partners ==
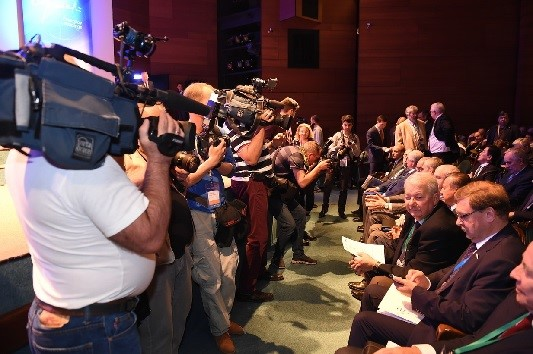
Primakov Readings 2017

In 2016, the event was supported by the Russian Science Foundation in partnership with The Think Tanks and Civil Societies Program of the University of Pennsylvania.

In 2017 IMEMO organized the Primakov Readings with the assistance of the Russian Science Foundation, the Chamber of Commerce and Industry of the Russian Federation, the Center for International Trade and the Center for Foreign Policy Cooperation named after E.M. Primakov. International partners of IMEMO were the Observer Research Foundation (India) and The Woodrow Wilson International Center for Scholars (USA).

== Media about the Primakov Readings ==
1. Putin receives former U.S. diplomat Kissinger in Kremlin // Reuters, 29.06.2017
2. Russia, China, U.S. could pool efforts to tackle global problems: Russian FM // New China, 01.07.2017
3. ‘PRIMAKOV READINGS’: Leading Experts and Politicians Took Part at the International Forum at WTC Moscow // WorldNews (WN) Network, 05.07.2017

== See also ==
- Institute of World Economy and International Relations
- Yevgeny Primakov
- Alexander Dynkin
