= List of chairmen of the Soviet of the Union =

The chairman of the Soviet of the Union was the presiding officer of the Soviet of the Union, the lower chamber of the Supreme Soviet of the Soviet Union.

== List of office-holders ==
Name	Entered office	Left office
Andrey Andreyev	12 January 1938	10 February 1946
Andrei Zhdanov	12 March 1946	25 February 1947
Ivan Parfenov	25 February 1947	12 June 1950
Mikhail Yasnov	1950	1956
Alexander Volkov	1954	1956
Pavel Lobanov	14 July 1956	18 March 1962
Ivan Spiridonov	1962	1970
Alexey Shitikov	1970	1984
Lev Tolkunov	1984	1988
Yury Khristoradnov	May 1988	1989
Yevgeny Primakov	3 June 1989	28 March 1990
Ivan Laptev	1990	1991
Konstantin Lubenchenko	1991	1991

== See also ==
- List of Chairmen of the Soviet of Nationalities
