= Yevgeny Primakov =

Russian politician and diplomat (1929–2015)

- Евгений Примаков
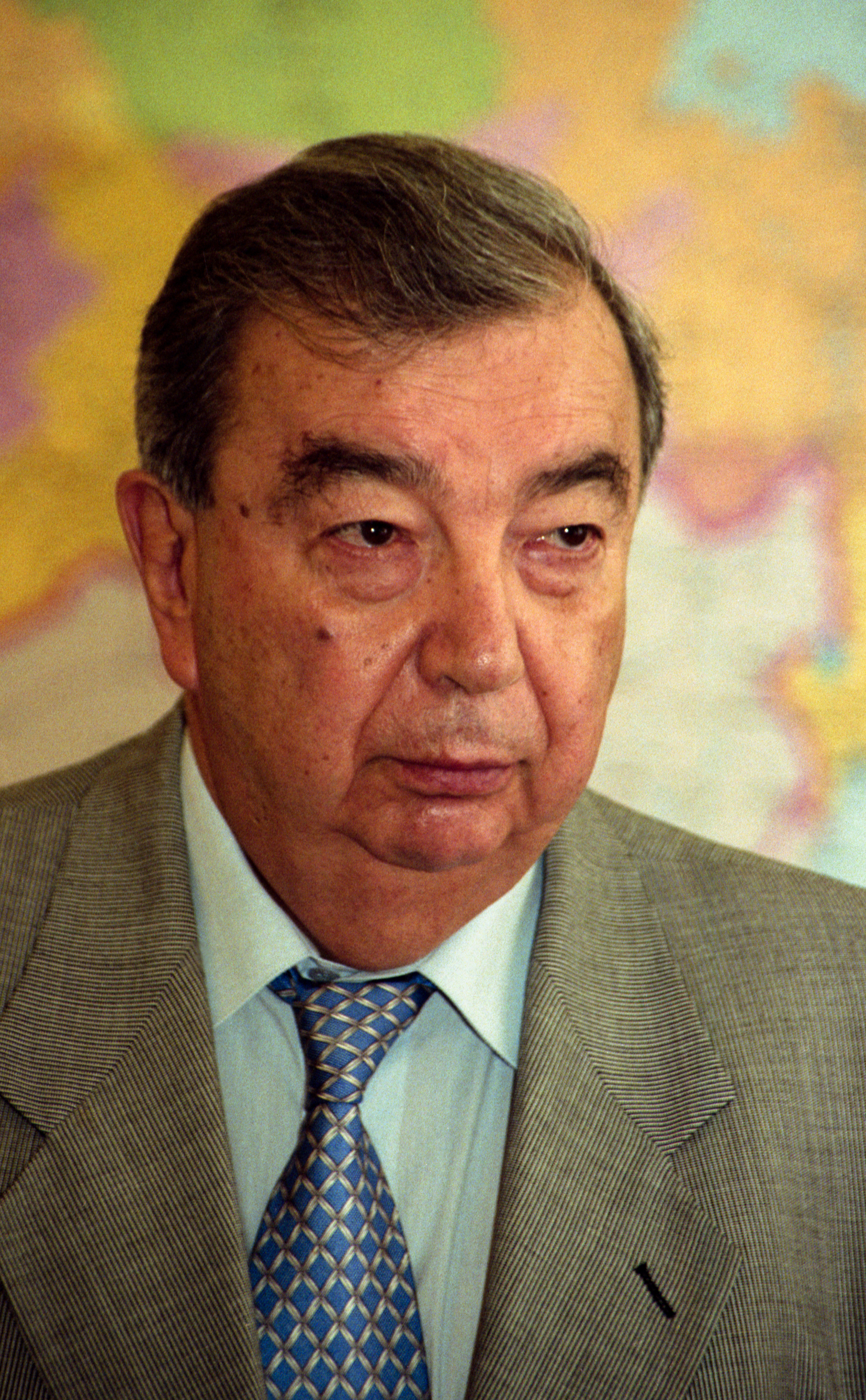
- Primakov in 2002

Prime Minister of Russia
- In office 11 September 1998 – 12 May 1999
- President: Boris Yeltsin
- First Deputy: Yuri Maslyukov; Vadim Gustov; Sergei Stepashin
- Preceded by: Viktor Chernomyrdin (acting)
- Succeeded by: Sergei Stepashin

Minister of Foreign Affairs
- In office 9 January 1996 – 11 September 1998
- President: Boris Yeltsin
- Preceded by: Andrei Kozyrev
- Succeeded by: Igor Ivanov

Director of the Foreign Intelligence Service
- In office 26 December 1991 – 9 January 1996
- President: Boris Yeltsin
- Preceded by: Position established
- Succeeded by: Vyacheslav Trubnikov

Director of the USSR Central Intelligence Service
- In office 6 November 1991 – 26 December 1991
- Preceded by: Position established
- Succeeded by: Position abolished

Head of the First Chief Directorate of the KGB
- In office 30 September 1991 – 6 November 1991
- Preceded by: Vyacheslav Gurgenov
- Succeeded by: Position abolished

Chairman of the Soviet of the Union of the Supreme Soviet of the USSR
- In office 3 June 1989 – 31 March 1990
- Preceded by: Yury Khristoradnov
- Succeeded by: Ivan Laptev

Personal details
- Born: 29 October 1929 Kiev, Ukrainian SSR, Soviet Union (now Kyiv, Ukraine)
- Died: 26 June 2015 (aged 85) Moscow, Russia
- Party: Communist Party of the Soviet Union (1950s–1991); Independent (1991–1998, 2002–2015); Fatherland – All Russia (1998–2002)
- Children: Alexander; Nana
- Relatives: Yevgeny Primakov Jr. (grandson)
- Education: Moscow Institute of Oriental Studies; Moscow State University
- Occupation: Politician, journalist, diplomat, secret agent
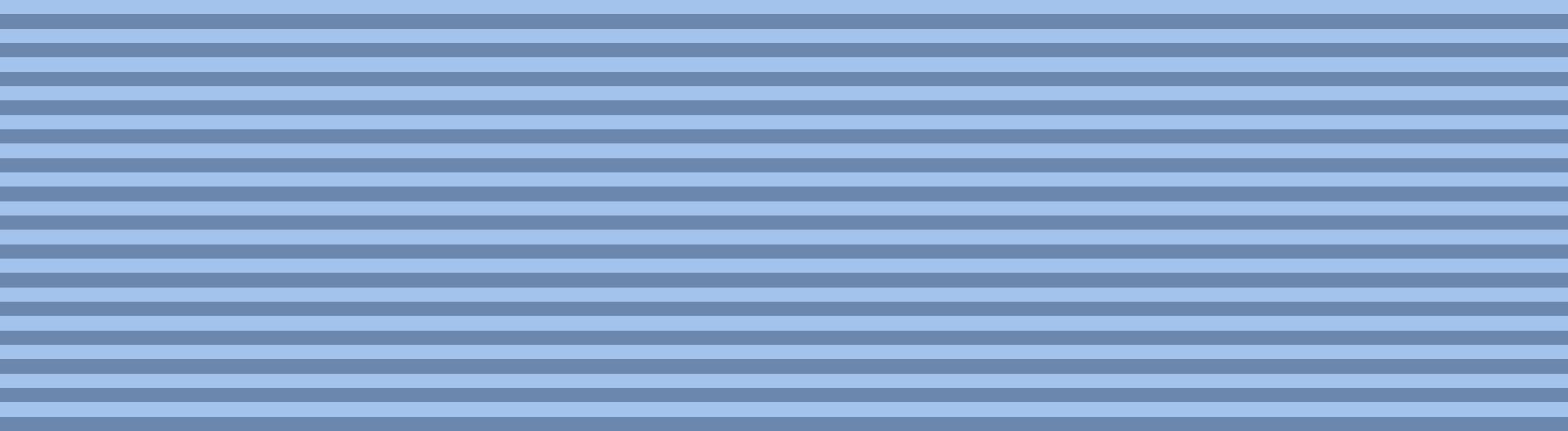
- Awards
- Central institution membership: 1989–1990: Candidate member, 27th Politburo; 1989–1990: Full member, 27th Central Committee; Other offices held: 1991–1996: Director, Foreign Intelligence Service; 1991–1991: Director, Centre for Strategic Research; 1991–1991: Director, KGB First Chief Directorate; 1989–1990: Chairman, Soviet of the Union

Yevgeny Maksimovich Primakov (Note: In this name that follows East Slavic naming customs, the patronymic is Maksimovich and the family name is Primakov.) (Note: Russian: Евге́ний Макси́мович Примако́в, romanized: Yevgeniy Maksimovich Primakov) (Russian pronunciation: [jɪvˈɡʲenʲɪj mɐˈksʲiməvʲɪtɕ prʲɪmɐˈkof]; 29 October 1929 – 26 June 2015) was a Russian politician and diplomat who served as Prime Minister of Russia from 1998 to 1999. During his long career, he also served as Minister of Foreign Affairs from 1996 to 1998, the Director of Foreign Intelligence from 1991 to 1996, and Speaker of the Supreme Soviet of the Soviet Union from 1990 to 1991. Primakov was an academician (Arabist) and a member of the Presidium of the Russian Academy of Sciences.

== Personal life ==
Primakov was born in Kyiv in the Ukrainian SSR, and grew up in Tbilisi in the Georgian SSR.

Primakov's father's surname was Nemchenko. He had been imprisoned in the Gulag during the Stalinist purges. Primakov's mother, Anna Yakovlevna Primakova, was Jewish. She worked as an obstetrician and was a cousin of the physiologist Yakov Kirshenblat.

Primakov was educated at the Moscow Institute of Oriental Studies, graduating in 1953, and carried out postgraduate work at Moscow State University. He graduated with a degree in Arabic.

His grandson is Yevgeny Primakov Jr. (Russian: Евгений Александрович Примаков), a journalist, TV host, politician and diplomat.

== Early career ==
From 1956 to 1970, he worked as a journalist for Soviet radio and a Middle Eastern correspondent for Pravda newspaper. During this time, he was sent frequently on intelligence missions to the Middle East and the United States as a KGB co-optee under codename MAKSIM. Primakov reportedly may have been coerced into joining the intelligence services.

As a Senior Researcher at the Institute of World Economy and International Relations, Primakov entered into scientific society in 1962. From 30 December 1970 to 1977, he served as deputy director of the Institute of World Economy and International Relations, part of the Academy of Sciences of the Soviet Union. In this role he participated in the Dartmouth Conferences alongside, among others, Charles Yost. From 1977 to 1985 he was Director of the Institute of Oriental Studies of the USSR Academy of Sciences. During this time he was also First Deputy Chairman of the Soviet Peace Committee. In 1985 he returned to the Institute of World Economy and International Relations, serving as Director until 1989.

Primakov became involved in national politics in 1989, as the Chairman of the Soviet of the Union, one of two chambers of the Soviet parliament. From 1990 until 1991 he was a member of Soviet leader Mikhail Gorbachev's Presidential Council of the Soviet Union. He served as Gorbachev's special envoy to Iraq in the run-up to the Persian Gulf War, in which capacity he held talks with President Saddam Hussein to try to convince him to withdraw Iraqi forces from Kuwait.

== Foreign intelligence chief (1991–1996) ==
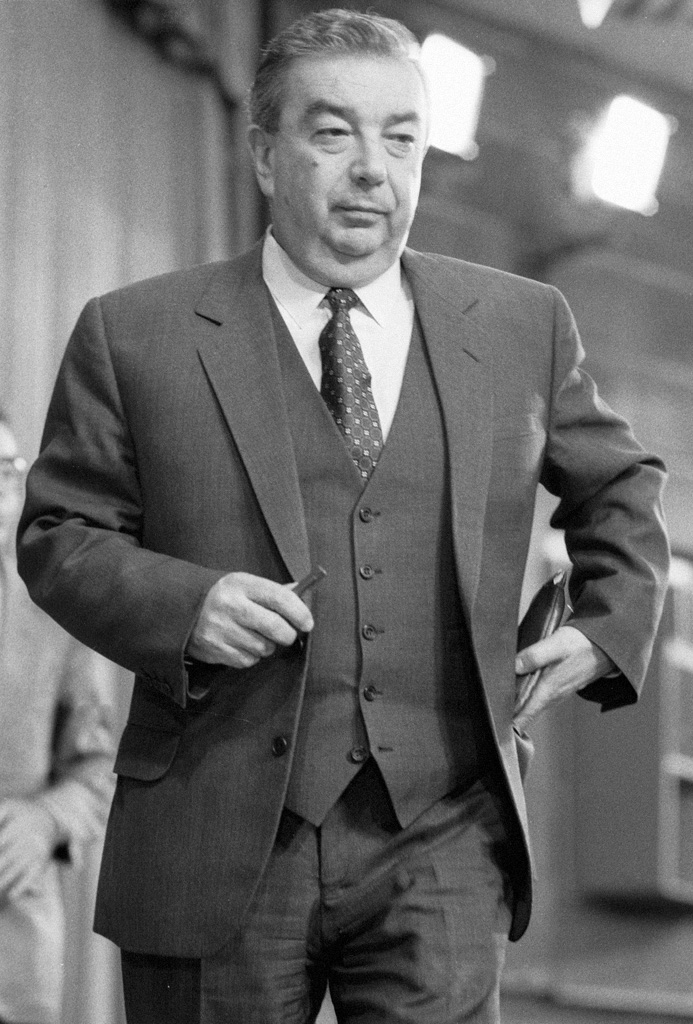
Primakov in 1991

After the failed August 1991 putsch, Primakov was appointed First Deputy Chairman of the KGB and Director of the KGB First Chief Directorate responsible for foreign intelligence.

After the formation of the Russian Federation, Primakov shepherded the transition of the KGB First Chief Directorate to the control of the Russian Federation government, under the new name Foreign Intelligence Service (SVR). Primakov preserved the old KGB foreign intelligence apparatus under the new SVR label, and led no personnel purges or structural reforms. He served as SVR director from 1991 until 1996. In 1992, Primakov admitted that the KGB was behind the Soviet newspaper articles claiming that AIDS was created by the US government.

== Russian Minister of Foreign Affairs (1996–1998) ==
Primakov served as Minister of Foreign Affairs from January 1996 until September 1998. As foreign minister, he gained respect at home and abroad, with a reputation as a tough but pragmatic supporter of Russia's interests and as an opponent of NATO's expansion into the former Eastern Bloc, though on 27 May 1997, after five months of negotiation with NATO Secretary General Javier Solana, Russia signed the Founding Act, which is seen as marking the end of Cold War hostilities. He supported Slobodan Milošević during the Yugoslav Wars.

He was also famously an advocate of multilateralism as an alternative to American global hegemony following the collapse of the Soviet Union and the end of the Cold War. Primakov called for a Russian foreign policy based on low-cost mediation while expanding influence towards the Middle East and the former Soviet republics. Called the "Primakov doctrine", beginning in 1999, he promoted Russia, India and China (RIC), origin of BRICS as a "strategic triangle" to counterbalance the United States. The move was interpreted by some observers as an agreement to fight together against 'colour revolutions' in Central Asia.

== Prime Minister of Russia (1998–1999) ==
After Yeltsin's bid to reinstate Viktor Chernomyrdin as Prime Minister of Russia was blocked by the State Duma in September 1998, the President turned to Primakov as a compromise figure whom he rightly judged would be accepted by the parliament's majority. As prime minister, Primakov was given credit for forcing some very difficult reforms in Russia; most of them, such as the tax reform, became major successes. Following the 1998 harvest, which was the worst in 45 years, coupled with a plummeting ruble, one of Primakov's first actions as prime minister, in October 1998, was to appeal to the United States and Canada for food aid, while also appealing to the European Union for economic relief.

While Primakov's opposition to US unilateralism was popular among some Russians, it also led to a breach with the West during the 1999 NATO bombing of Yugoslavia, and isolated Russia during subsequent developments in the former Yugoslavia.

On 24 March 1999, Primakov was heading to Washington, D.C. for an official visit. Flying over the Atlantic Ocean, he learned that NATO had started to bomb Yugoslavia. Primakov decided to cancel the visit, ordered the plane to turn around over the ocean and returned to Moscow in a manoeuvre popularly dubbed "Primakov's Loop".

Yeltsin fired Primakov on 12 May 1999, ostensibly over the sluggish pace of the Russian economy. Many analysts believed the firing of Primakov reflected Yeltsin's fear of losing power to a more successful and popular person, although sources close to Yeltsin said at the time that the president viewed Primakov as being too close to the Communist Party. Primakov himself would have had good chances as a candidate for the presidency. Primakov had refused to dismiss Communist ministers while the Communist Party was leading the process of preparing unsuccessful impeachment proceedings against the president. Ultimately, Yeltsin resigned at the end of the year and was succeeded by his last prime minister, Vladimir Putin, whom Primakov had tried to fire from his role as head of the FSB when he tapped the phone of the Duma President. Primakov's dismissal was extremely unpopular with the Russian population: according to a poll, 81% of the population did not approve of the decision, and even among the liberal pro-Western party Yabloko supporters, 84% did not approve of the dismissal.

== Post-PM career ==
After 1998, Primakov held several roles: Academic Secretary of the World Economy and International Relations Division, director of the Institute of World Economy and International Relations and member of the Presidium of the Academy of Sciences of the Soviet Union.

Before Yeltsin's resignation, Primakov supported the Fatherland – All Russia electoral faction, which at that time was the major opponent of the pro-Putin Unity, and launched his presidential bid. Initially considered the man to beat, Primakov was rapidly overtaken by the factions loyal to Prime Minister Vladimir Putin in the December 1999 Duma elections. Primakov officially abandoned the presidential race in his TV address on 4 February 2000 less than two months before the 26 March presidential elections. Soon he became an adviser to Putin and a political ally. On 14 December 2001, Primakov became President of the Russian Chamber of Commerce and Industry, a position he held until 2011.

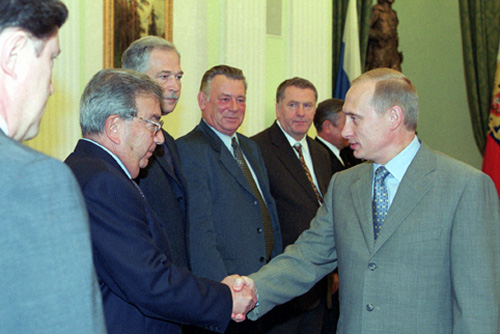
Leader of Fatherland – All Russia Duma faction Yevgeny Primakov meets President Vladimir Putin, 2000

In February and March 2003, he visited Iraq and held talks with Iraqi President Saddam Hussein, as a special representative of President Putin. He passed on a message from Putin calling for Hussein to resign voluntarily. He tried to prevent the 2003 U.S.-led invasion of Iraq, a move which received some support from several nations opposed to the war. Primakov suggested that Hussein must hand over all Iraq's weapons of mass destruction to the United Nations, among other things. However, Hussein told Primakov that he was confident that nothing would befall him personally—a belief that was later proven incorrect. Primakov later claimed Hussein's execution in 2006 was rushed to prevent him from revealing information on Iraq–United States relations that could embarrass the U.S. government. In a 2006 speech Primakov thundered that: "The collapse of the US policies pursued in Iraq delivered a fatal blow on the American doctrine of unilateralism."

On 26 May 2008, Primakov was elected as a member of the Presidium of the Russian Academy of Sciences. In 2009, the University of Niš, Serbia awarded Primakov an honorary doctorate.

In November 2004, Primakov testified in defense of the former Yugoslav President Slobodan Milošević, on trial for war crimes. He had earlier led a Russian delegation that met with Milošević during the NATO bombing of Yugoslavia in March 1999.

== Death ==
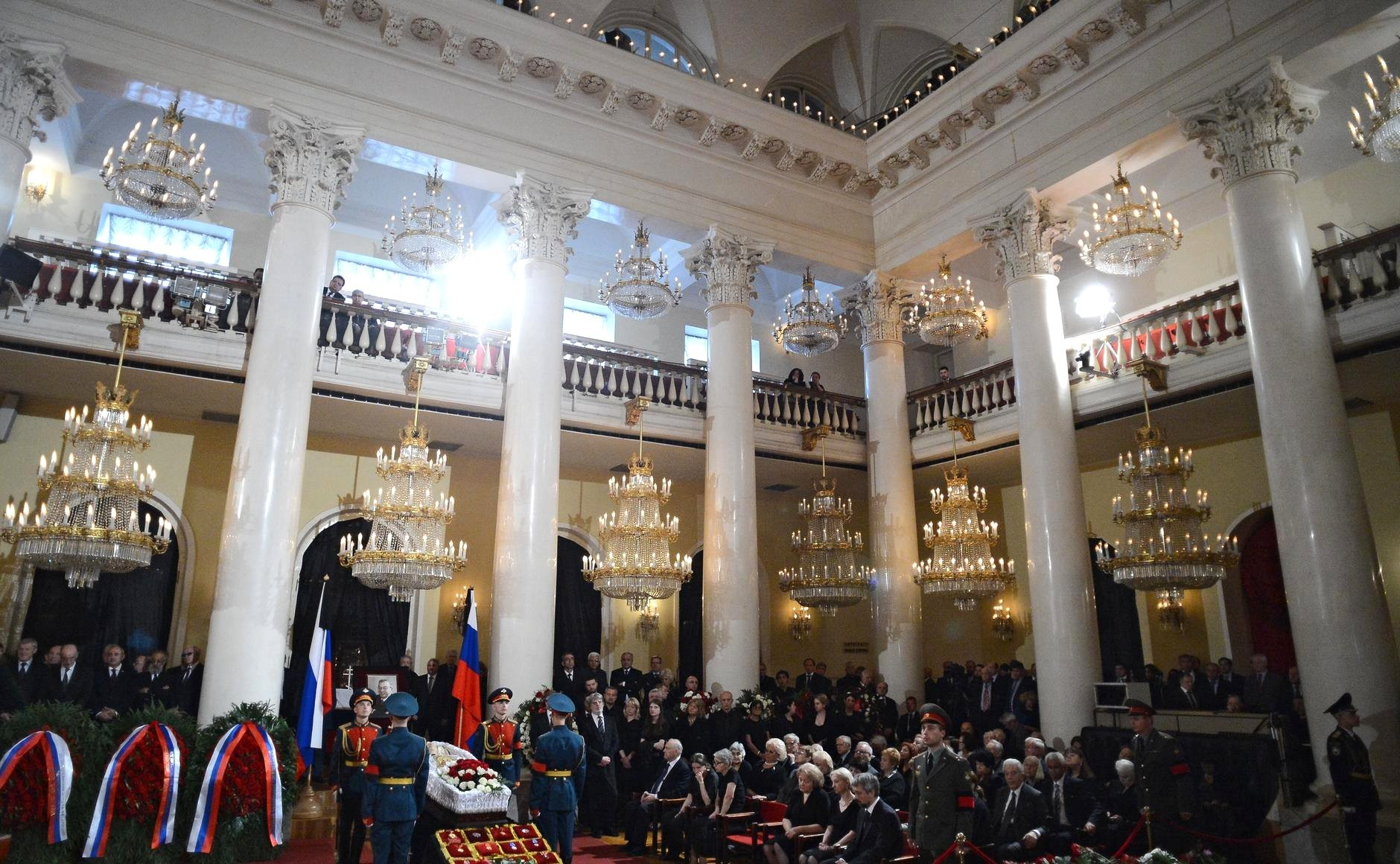
Farewell to Yevgeny Primakov on 29 June 2015

Primakov died in Moscow on 26 June 2015, at the age of 85, after prolonged illness (liver cancer). He was buried with military honours at Novodevichy Cemetery. He was lionized in Russia obituaries as "the Russian Kissinger", and President Vladimir Putin said Primakov had made a "colossal contribution to the formation of modern Russia... This is a sad, grievous loss for our society. … Yevgeny's authority was respected both in our country and abroad..." Indeed, "his death occurred at a time when his positions [were] very much the official line and the backbone for Putin's grand strategy."

In honor of Primakov, Primakov Readings was established in October 2015 - an annual international summit aimed at promoting dialogue on current global trends in the world economy, international politics and security among high-ranking experts, diplomats and decision-makers from around the Globe, organized by the Institute of World Economy and International Relations and held in Moscow.

One of his credos was: "Those who do good will be rewarded. Life gets even with those who do bad."

== Awards ==
- Order of Merit for the Fatherland 1st Class (2009)
- Order of Merit for the Fatherland 2nd Class (1998)
- Order of Merit for the Fatherland 3rd Class (1995)
- Medal "In Commemoration of the 850th Anniversary of Moscow" (1997)
- Order of Honor (2004)
- Order of Lenin (1986)
- Order of the Badge of Honor (1985)
- Order of Friendship of Peoples (1979)
- Order of the Red Banner of Labour (1975)
- Medal "Veteran of Labour" (1974)
- Order of Friendship (Tajikistan, 1999)
- Order of Yaroslav I the Wise 5th Class (Ukraine, 2004)
- Order of Danaker (Kyrgyzstan) (2005)
- Order of Friendship of Peoples (Belarus, 2005)
- Order of Dostyk 1st Class (Kazakhstan, 2007)
- Order of the Republic 1st Class (Transnistria, 2009)
- Medal of Independence (Kazakhstan, 2012)
- Order of Jerusalem 1st Class (Palestinian National Authority, 2014)
- Demidov Prize (2012)
- Recipient of the USSR State Prize (1980)
- Recipient of the Nasser Prize (1974)
- Recipient of the Avicenna Prize (1983)
- Recipient of the George F. Kennan Prize (1990)
- Recipient of the Hugo Grotius Prize for the huge contribution to the development of international law and for the creation of a multipolar world doctrine (2000).

== Publications ==
- 1979: Anatomy of the Middle East Conflict
- 2003: A World Challenged: Fighting Terrorism in the Twenty-First Century
- 2004: Russian Crossroads: Toward the New Millennium
- 2009: Russia and the Arabs: Behind the Scenes in the Middle East from the Cold War to the Present
- 2014: Встречи на перекрестках (Meetings at the crossroads)

== See also ==
- Yevgeny Primakov's Cabinet
- Yevgeny Primakov Jr.
- Operation INFEKTION
- Primakov Readings

== Notes ==
Government offices
Preceded by Leonid Shebarshin	Director of the KGB First Chief Directorate; 1991	Position abolished
Position established	Director of the USSR Centre for Strategic Research; 1991	Position abolished
Position established	Director of the Foreign Intelligence Service; 1991–1996	Succeeded by Vyacheslav Trubnikov
Political offices
Preceded by Yury Khristoradnov	Chairman of the Soviet of the Union; 1989–1990	Succeeded by Ivan Laptev
Preceded by Andrei Kozyrev	Minister of Foreign Affairs; 1996–1998	Succeeded by Igor Ivanov
Preceded by Viktor Chernomyrdin; Acting	Prime Minister of Russia; 1998–1999	Succeeded by Sergei Stepashin
