= Ramzy Ezzeldin Ramzy =

Egyptian diplomat

Ramzy Ezzeldin Ramzy (born February 4, 1954) is an Egyptian diplomat who has served as Advisor for Political Affairs to the President of Egypt since April 2026. He previously served as United Nations Assistant Secretary-General and Deputy Special Envoy for Syria from 2014 to 2019. Over a diplomatic career spanning more than four decades, he held senior positions in the Egyptian Ministry of Foreign Affairs, the United Nations, and the League of Arab States.

== Early life and education ==
Ramzy comes from a family with longstanding diplomatic, political, academic and military connections in Egypt. His father, Ezzeldin Ramzy, who served as a Major General in the Egyptian Air Force, was posted as Air Force Attaché at the Egyptian embassy in Prague before joining the diplomatic service. He later served as Egypt’s ambassador to Burma and Morocco. His grandfather El Sayed Ramzy (Pasha) was the first Egyptian to be appointed as Head of Police under the monarchy. Among Ramzy’s maternal relatives were Mostafa Kamel El (Bek) Ghamrawy a principal founder of Cairo University; intellectual and politician Mostafa (Pasha) Abdel Razek, who served as Sheikh al-Azhar; writer and scholar Ali ( Pasha) Abdel Razek; and statesman Abdel Khalek (Pasha) Sarwat Pasha, who served as Prime Minister of Egypt following Egyptian independence in 1922. Ramzy was educated at Victoria College in Cairo after spending parts of his childhood abroad in Czechoslovakia, Burma, and Morocco, where his father served in the Egyptian diplomatic corps. He later earned a Bachelor of Arts in Economics from the American University in Cairo and a Master of Science in Economics from the University of Surrey in the United Kingdom.

== Diplomatic career ==
Ramzy joined the Egyptian diplomatic service in 1976. During his career, he served in Egyptian diplomatic missions in New York, Moscow, and Washington, D.C. He held ambassadorial assignments to Germany, Austria, Brazil, Slovakia, Suriname, and Guyana. He also served as Permanent Representative of Egypt to the United Nations and other international organizations in Vienna. In that capacity, he served on the Board of Governors of the International Atomic Energy Agency (IAEA) and as Egypt’s Permanent Observer to the Organization for Security and Co-operation in Europe (OSCE). Ramzy additionally served as Permanent Observer of the League of Arab States to the United Nations and other international organizations in Vienna. In July 2014, United Nations Secretary-General Ban Ki-moon appointed Ramzy as Deputy Special Envoy for Syria under Special Envoy Staffan de Mistura. Holding the rank of Assistant Secretary-General, he participated in UN mediation efforts relating to the Syrian conflict until 2019. Following his retirement from the United Nations, Ramzy continued to participate in international policy forums and diplomatic discussions concerning Middle Eastern security, conflict resolution, and international diplomacy. Ramzy has participated in international policy forums including the Munich Security Conference, the Manama Dialogue, the Valdai Discussion Club, the Primakov Readings, the Sir Bani Yas Forum, the Korber Foundation, the Middle East Institute, the Beirut Summit and the European Council on Foreign Relations. His commentary and analysis have appeared in publications including the Financial Times, Al Sharq Al-Awsat, Al Majalla, Al Shorouk, Al Masry Al Youm, Al Ahram Weekly, the Cairo Review of Global Affairs, the Valdai Discussion Club, and Russia in Global Affairs. In April 2026, President Abdel Fattah el-Sisi appointed him Advisor for Political Affairs to the President of the Arab Republic of Egypt.
