= Georgy Arbatov =

Soviet-Russian political scientist (1923–2010)

- Георгий Арбатов
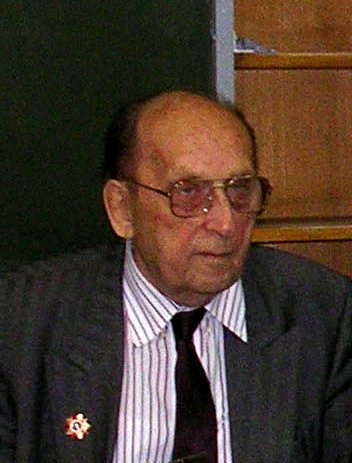
- Arbatov in 2005
- Born: 19 May 1923; Kherson, Ukrainian SSR, Soviet Union
- Died: 1 October 2010 (aged 87); Moscow, Russia
- Occupations: Founder, director of the Institute for US and Canadian Studies

Georgy Arkadyevich Arbatov (Russian: Георгий Аркадьевич Арбатов; 19 May 1923 – 1 October 2010) was a Soviet–Russian political scientist. He served as an adviser to five General Secretaries of the Communist Party of the Soviet Union and was best known in the West during the Cold War era as a representative for the policies of the Soviet Union in the United States, where his fluent English helped make him a frequent guest on American television.

He was the founding director and later emeritus director of the Institute for US and Canadian Studies of the Soviet Academy of Sciences (ISKRAN), the Soviet and Russian think tank for the study of the US and Canada. Arbatov died on 1 October 2010, at the age of 87. Arbatov is regarded as one of the leading Jewish figures in the Soviet Union and Russia.

== Early career ==
Arbatov was born the son of a Bolshevik, Arkady Arbatov (1898–1954), who was of Jewish origin. His father was part of several Soviet trade missions in the 1930s. Arbatov fought in the Red Army during World War II, taking part in the Revolution Day parade on Red Square on 7 November 1941 and heading from there to the front lines. Arbatov finished the war as chief of staff of the 17th Guards mortar regiment and was awarded the Order of the Red Star in 1943.

While recuperating from tuberculosis in 1944, Arbatov was in a hospital and read an item in a newspaper report stating that a state institute of international relations was being created in Moscow. He applied to attend the school and graduated from the Moscow State Institute of International Relations in 1949, he was awarded a Ph.D. from the same institute in 1954. He worked as a journalist and commentator on foreign affairs between 1953 and 1963 at Kommunist and the English language publication The New Times.

== Political scientist ==
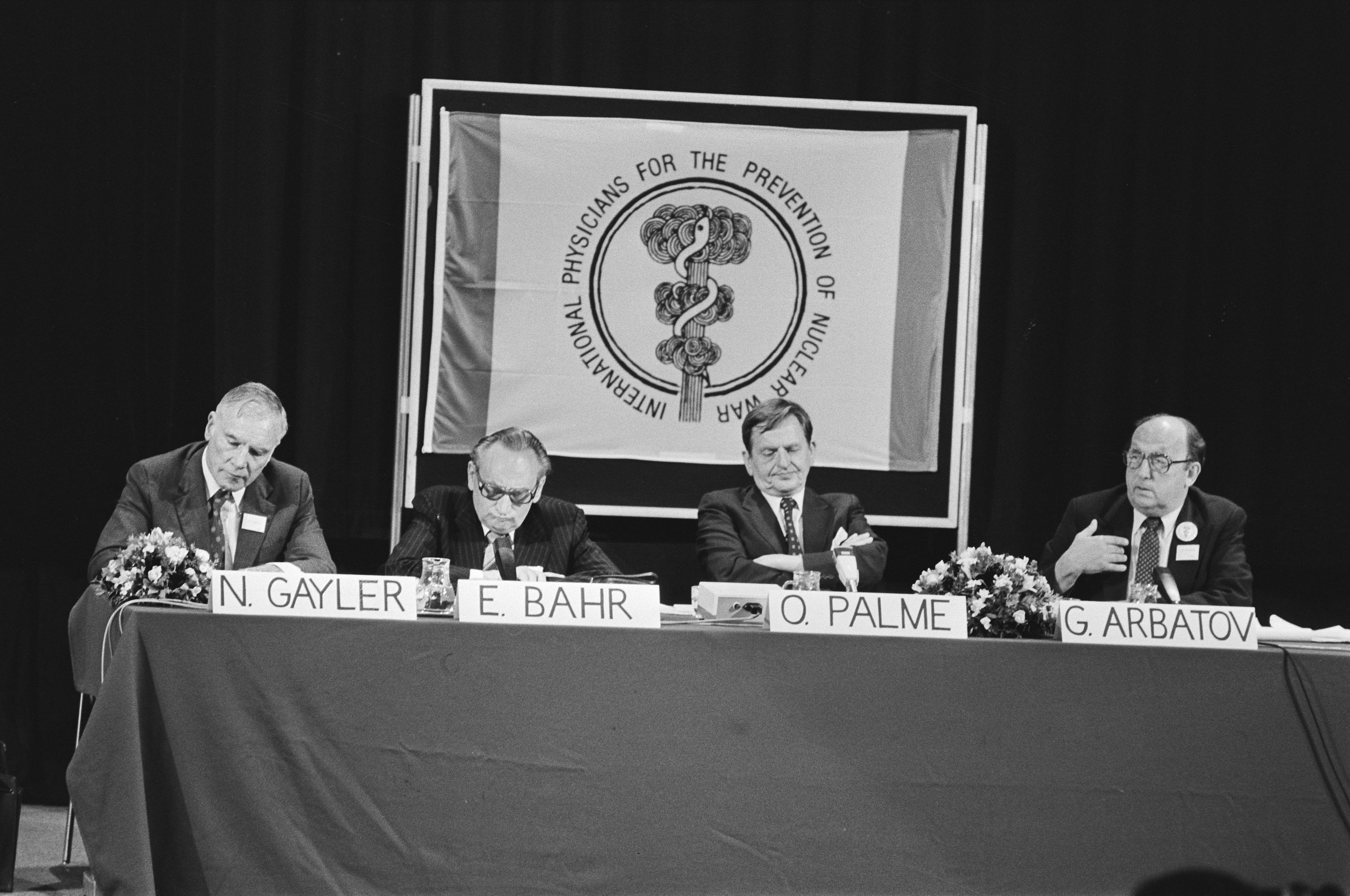
Arbatov in June 1983 at a conference of the International Physicians for the Prevention of Nuclear War (IPPNW) in Amsterdam

Arbatov worked at the institute of global economics of the Soviet Academy of Sciences in 1963–64. He was founder director of the Institute for US and Canadian Studies (ISKRAN) from 1965 to 1995. He was appointed director emeritus of the ISKRAN in 1995. He was appointed adviser to the Central Committee of the CPSU on US matters in 1964–67. He was elected to the Central Committee in 1990 and served in the Supreme Soviet. As an adviser to five General Secretaries of the Communist Party, Arbatov was a frequent participant in arms control negotiations conducted between the US and USSR. According to the CIA, Arbatov was an intermediary between the Politburo and the KGB.

Arbatov became the face of the Soviet Union in the West, where he used his strong, though heavily accented, command of the English language to help foster ties with American officials and to present Soviet views to the American public, sparring on American television with such individuals as General Bernard Rogers, the former commander of NATO regarding the military deterrent in Western Europe to Soviet forces. Billy Graham, who had called communism "satanic", said that he had "met a very wonderful official here" after spending three hours together during Graham's 1982 visit to Moscow. Arbatov expressed sharp criticism of the Reagan administration, saying that it conducted a "campaign of demonization, of dehumanization of the other side", remarks that led to difficulties for Arbatov in obtaining visas to enter the United States during that period.

In his 1992 autobiography The System: An Insider's Life in Soviet Politics, Arbatov credited himself as one of those individuals who had worked to implement reform "from the inside, and not from the outside, of the system" that laid the groundwork for the reforms implemented in the 1980s by Mikhail Gorbachev. Sergey Rogov, who succeeded him in 1995 as director of the Institute for US and Canadian Studies called Arbatov someone who "was probably willing more than anybody else to stick his neck out" to mitigate the influence of anti-American hard liners in the Soviet regime, though "he knew pretty well what were the red lines that he could not cross publicly, and he was very cautious about it". Arbatov recognized that the Soviet Union had lost the Cold War, but insisted that the United States had suffered too by losing "The Enemy", a main adversary consisting of one country on which to concentrate efforts.

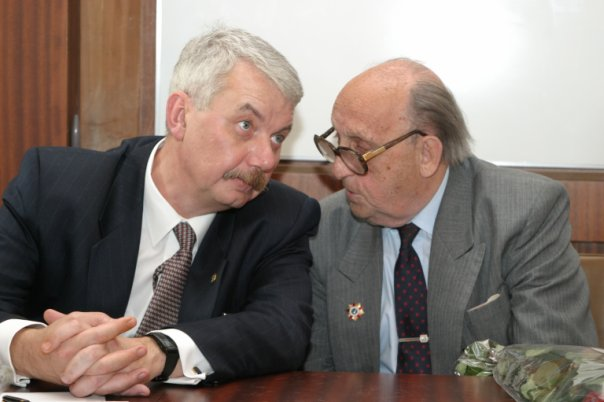
Sergey Rogov with Arbatov, 2005

Following the dissolution of the Soviet Union, Arbatov was an adviser to the State Duma and a member of the foreign policy council of the Foreign Ministry of the Russian Federation between 1991 and 1996. He was a supporter of the transfer of the southern Kuril Islands to Japan. Arbatov was a critic of the economic reforms implemented by Boris Yeltsin, saying that they placed too much economic and political power in the hands of an unelected few at the expense of the middle class in Russia. He also was a critic of Vladimir Putin's efforts to suppress the democratic movement in Russia.

Arbatov was a participant in the Pugwash Conferences on Science and World Affairs.

== Personal life and recognition ==
Arbatov was awarded two Orders of Lenin, an Order of the October Revolution, two Orders of the Red Banner of Labour and other medals.

Arbatov died at age 87 on 1 October 2010 in Moscow due to cancer. He was survived by his wife, Svetlana, as well as by his son Aleksei, who also became involved with arms control issues and became a Duma member.

Buried at the Donskoye Cemetery in Moscow.

== Published work ==
Arbatov was the author of over 100 published works:

- Идеологическая борьба в современных международных отношениях. Доктрина, методы и организация внешнеполитической пропаганды империализма, Moscow 1970; (Ideological conflict in Modern International Relations, Doctrine, Methods and Organisation of the Foreign Policy Propaganda of Imperialism). English edition
- Глобальная стратегия США в условиях научно-технической революции (The Global strategy of the USA in Conditions of the Scientific/ Technical Revolution), Moscow 1979
- (with Willem L. Oltmans): Het sowjet-standpunt, Moskou's visie op de oost-west-politiek, Haarlem 1981(ISBN 90 6265 080 5); Der sowjetische Standpunkt. Über die Westpolitik der UDSSR, München 1981 (ISBN 3-8077-0165-6)
- Свидетельство современника (Testimony of a Contemporary Man), Moscow 1991; published in English as The System. An Insiders Life in Soviet Politics. N.Y., 1992
- Затянувшееся выздоровление (1953-1985 гг.), Moscow 1991 (ISBN 5-7133-0385-3) (A Prolonged Recovery),
- Общественная наука и политика (Social Sciences and Politics), Moscow 1998
- Повестка дня российско-американских отношений (An Agenda for Russo-American Relations), Moscow 1999
- Человек Системы (A Man of the System), Moscow 2002
- Детство. Отрочество. Война: Автобиография на фоне исторических событий (Childhood, Adolescence, War: an Autobiography with a background of historical events), Moscow 2007
