= Inozemtsev =

Inozemtsev (Russian: Иноземцев) is a Russian masculine surname, its feminine counterpart is Inozemtseva. It may refer to

- Nikolay Inozemtsev (1921–1982), Russian economist and journalist
- Vladislav Inozemtsev, Russian academician
- Volodymyr Inozemtsev (born 1964–2020), Ukrainian triple jumper
