= Konstantin Lubenchenko =

Soviet and Russian jurist and politician

- Константин Лубенченко

Chairman of the Soviet of the Union
- In office 28 October 1991 – 2 January 1992
- Succeeded by: Dissolution of the Soviet Union, Office Abolished

Personal details
- Born: 27 October 1945 (age 81) Mozhaysk, Moscow Oblast, Russian SFSR, Soviet Union
- Education: Moscow State University Faculty of Law
- Occupation: Jurist, politician, academic

Konstantin Dmitriyevich Lubenchenko (Russian: Константин Дмитриевич Лубенченко; born 27 October 1945) is a Soviet and Russian jurist, academic, and former politician. He served as the last Chairman of the Soviet of the Union, the lower chamber of the Supreme Soviet of the USSR, in 1991 and 1992.

A People's Deputy of the USSR from 1989, he was active during the late Perestroika period, sat in the Inter-Regional Deputy Group, and later held senior administrative and legal roles in post-Soviet Russia, including Deputy Chairman of the Central Bank of Russia and Minister serving as the Government's Plenipotentiary Representative in the State Duma.

== Early life and education ==
Konstantin Dmitrievich Lubenchenko was born on 27 October 1945 in the town of Mozhaysk in Moscow Oblast, into the family of a serviceman. His childhood and youth were spent in the Moscow region, which in the post-war decades became a center of industrial and scientific development. Professional biographies note that he resided for many years in Zhukovsky, a major Soviet aviation and engineering hub.

Before beginning higher education, Lubenchenko worked in several technical and engineering positions. From 1964 to 1965 he was employed as an electrician at industrial enterprise post box 12 in Zhukovsky. Between 1965 and 1966 he worked as a fitter at enterprise post box 15, and from 1966 to 1967 he served as a fitter and radio technician at the Radio Engineering Design Bureau in Zhukovsky, part of the Soviet aviation and communications sector. In 1967–1968 he held the position of laboratory assistant at the All-Union Electrotechnical Institute of Communications in Moscow, and from 1968 until 1973 he worked as an electromechanic at Cable Trunk Line Administration No. 22, which oversaw communications infrastructure in the capital.

In 1973 Lubenchenko graduated from the Moscow State University Faculty of Law. He entered postgraduate studies at the Department of Theory of State and Law, completing them in 1976. In 1978 he defended his Candidate of Juridical Sciences dissertation on systemic structural analysis of law in developed socialist society, supervised by Professor A. I. Denisov.

== Academic career ==
Beginning in 1976, Lubenchenko joined the Moscow State University Faculty of Law as an assistant. He became an associate professor in 1981, teaching in the Department of Theory of State and Law and Political Science. He has remained associated with MSU for decades, teaching courses on state theory, legal philosophy, and political-legal institutions. MSU recognized him as an Honored Graduate in 1998, and he later became a member of the Russian Academy of Natural Sciences (RAEN).

His academic interests include public law, constitutional development, legislative process analysis, and the evolution of state institutions during periods of political transition.

== Political career in the Soviet Union ==
=== People's Deputy of the USSR ===
In 1989 Lubenchenko was elected a People's Deputy of the Soviet Union from the Ramenskoye territorial constituency in Moscow Oblast. He became a member of the Soviet of the Union, the lower chamber of the Supreme Soviet of the Soviet Union. Within the new parliament he joined the Inter-Regional Deputies Group, the first large informal opposition bloc in the late Soviet legislature.

From 1990 to 1991 he served as Deputy Chairman of the Supreme Soviet Committee on Legislation, participating in debates on constitutional reform, the 1991 referendum, and legislative frameworks related to political and economic restructuring.

=== Chairman of the Soviet of the Union ===
Following the failure of the August 1991 coup and the adoption of the USSR law "On the bodies of state power and administration of the USSR in the transitional period" on 5 September 1991, the chambers of the Supreme Soviet were reorganized.

On 28 October 1991 Lubenchenko was elected Chairman of the Soviet of the Union. Contemporary reports state he was elected without opposition, receiving 127 votes in favor and 12 against. His tenure occurred during the dissolution of the Soviet Union, and the chamber ceased functioning after December 1991, when the USSR formally ended.

== Post-Soviet political activity ==
=== Constitutional institutions ===
After the dissolution of the Soviet state, Lubenchenko briefly served as an advisor to the Chairman of the Constitutional Court of Russia in early 1992. He later became General Director of the Parliamentary Center of the Supreme Soviet of Russia, a research and support body associated with the post-Soviet legislature. He resigned in 1993, citing disagreements over the center's institutional role.

Political memoirs later noted that Lubenchenko played a minor informational role during the escalating 1993 Russian constitutional crisis. Analyst G. A. Satarov wrote that Lubenchenko relayed concerns to the presidential administration, though such accounts remain attributed interpretations rather than confirmed archival findings.

=== Central Bank of Russia ===
In 1994 Lubenchenko joined the Central Bank of Russia as head of its Legal Department. He became Deputy Chairman of the Central Bank in 1995, serving until 1999. He also served on the Bank's Committee for Banking Supervision beginning in 1996.

=== Minister of the Russian Federation ===
On 14 January 2000 Lubenchenko was appointed a Minister serving as the Government's Plenipotentiary Representative in the State Duma. He represented government positions before the lower house of the Federal Assembly and coordinated executive-legislative interaction. His term concluded in June 2000 following a government reorganization ordered by presidential decree.

== Honours and awards ==
- Recipient of the legal prize "Femida" for contributions to Russian legal development.

== See also ==
- Soviet of the Union
- Supreme Soviet of the Soviet Union
- 1993 Russian constitutional crisis
- Central Bank of Russia
