= Ivan Laptev (politician) =

Russian journalist and politician (1934–2025)

Ivan Dimitrievich Laptev (Russian: Иван Дмитриевич Лаптев; 15 October 1934 – 2 November 2025) was a Russian journalist and politician. He was a member of the Supreme Soviet of the Soviet Union from 1984 to 1989 and chairman of the Soviet of the Union from 1990 to 1991.

Laptev died on 2 November 2025, at the age of 91.
