= 1984 Soviet Union legislative election =

- 4 March 1984
- Soviet of the Union
- All 750 seats in the Soviet of the Union
Party	Seats	+/–
Communist Party	551	+2
Independents	199	−2
This lists parties that won seats. See the complete results below.
- Soviet of Nationalities
- All 750 seats in the Soviet of Nationalities
Party	Seats	+/–
Communist Party	521	−5
Independents	229	+5
This lists parties that won seats. See the complete results below.
Chairman of the Council of Ministers before	Chairman of the Council of Ministers after
Nikolai Tikhonov; CPSU	Nikolai Tikhonov; CPSU

Supreme Soviet elections were held in the Soviet Union on 4 March 1984. The elections were called on 16 December 1983. The elections were not free and fair, as there was no genuine competition and no meaningful choice for voters to make.

They were the last in the Soviet Union to be held before Mikhail Gorbachev's policies of perestroika and demokratizatsiya resulted in partially free elections in 1989. They were also the last direct elections to the Supreme Soviet, as in 1989 deputies were elected to the Congress of People's Deputies, who then elected the Supreme Soviet.

== Electoral system ==
Candidates had to be nominated by the Communist Party of the Soviet Union (CPSU) or by a public organisation. However, all public organisations were controlled by the party and were subservient to a 1931 law that required them to accept party rule. The CPSU itself remained the only legal one in the country.

Voters could vote against the CPSU candidate, but could only do so by using polling booths, whereas votes for the party could be cast simply by submitting a blank ballot. Turnout was required to be over 50% for the election to be valid.

== Candidates ==
CPSU candidates accounted for around three quarters of the nominees, whilst many of the others were members of Komsomol.

== Results ==
With over 184 million Soviet citizens voting in the election, over 99% of the votes went to a deputy to the Supreme Soviet, with over 100,000 votes against Party candidates, the lowest for any election in the Soviet Union.

=== Soviet of the Union ===
Party	Votes	%	Seats	+/–
Communist Party of the Soviet Union	183,897,278	99.94	551	+2
Independents	183,897,278	99.94	199	–2
Against	109,078	0.06	–	–
Total	184,006,356	100.00	750	0
Valid votes	184,006,356	100.00		
Invalid/blank votes	17	0.00		
Total votes	184,006,373	100.00		
Registered voters/turnout	184,029,412	99.99		
Source: Nohlen & Stöver

=== Soviet of Nationalities ===
Party	Votes	%	Seats	+/–
Communist Party of the Soviet Union	183,592,183	99.77	521	–5
Independents	183,592,183	99.77	229	+5
Against	414,172	0.23	–	–
Total	184,006,355	100.00	750	0
Valid votes	184,006,355	100.00		
Invalid/blank votes	18	0.00		
Total votes	184,006,373	100.00		
Registered voters/turnout	184,029,412	99.99		
Source: Nohlen & Stöver
