= Institute of World Economy and International Relations =

Russian independent research institute

Primakov Institute of World Economy and International Relations
- Национальный исследовательский институт мировой экономики и международных отношений имени Е. М. Примакова Российской академии наук
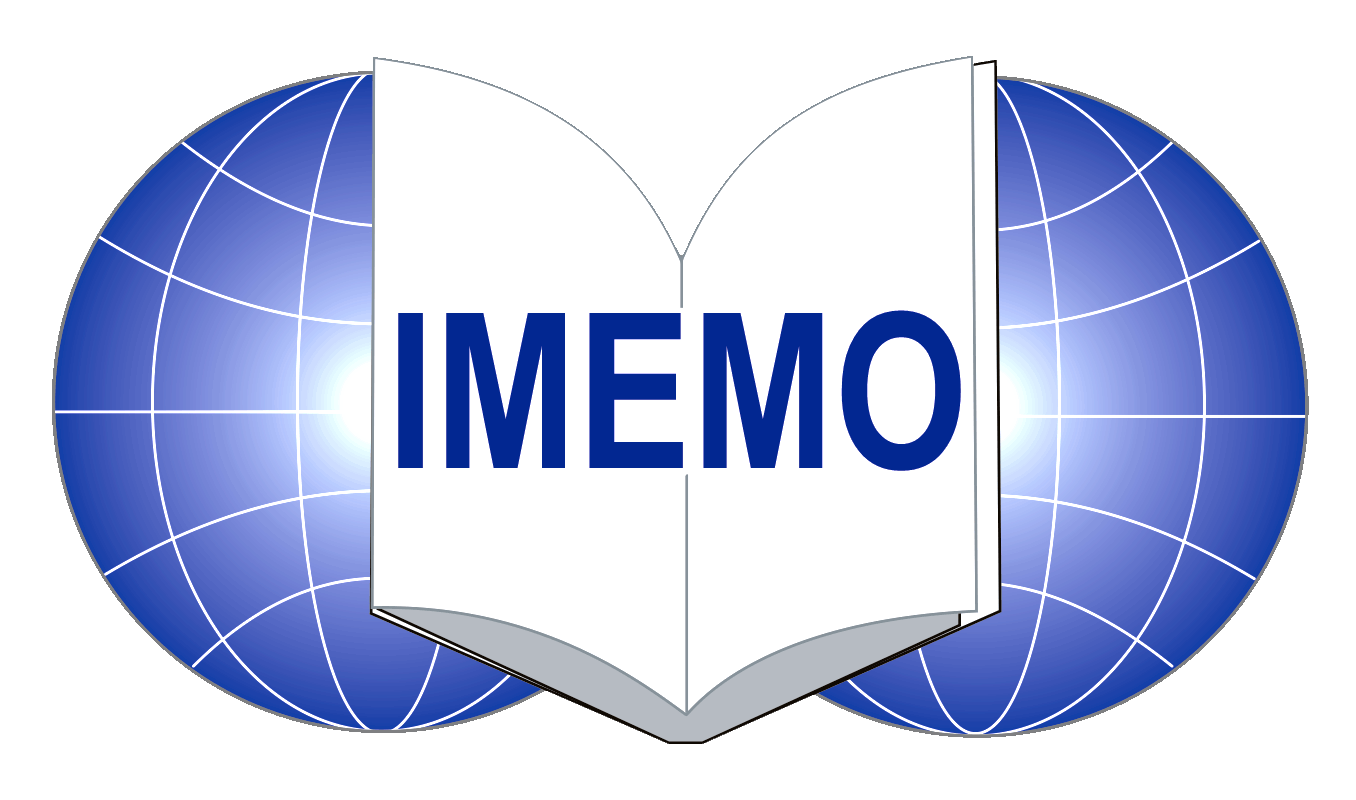
- Established: 1956
- Field of research: Economics, Political Science, International Relations
- Director: Fyodor Voytolovskiy
- Location: Moscow, Russia; 55.6747°N 37.5613°E
- Affiliations: Russian Academy of Sciences
- Website: imemo.ru/en

The Institute of World Economy and International Relations (Russian: Институт мировой экономики и международных отношений), or IMEMO, is an independent research institute based in Moscow, Russia. In August 2015 the Institute has changed its name to the Primakov Institute of World Economy and International Relations to commemorate the name of its former director academician Yevgeny Primakov, who led the Institute from 1985–1989.

Founded in 1956 as a successor to the earlier Institute of World Economy and Politics (1925–1948), the institute is a non-profit organization acting within the Charter of the Russian Academy of Sciences.

== Directors of the Institute ==
- 1956–1965: Anoushavan Arzoumanian
- 1965–1966: Vladimir Aboltin (acting)
- 1966–1982: Nikolai N. Inozemtsev
- 1983–1985: Alexander Nikolaevich Yakovlev
- 1985–1989: Yevgeny Primakov
- 1989–2000: Vladlen Martynov
- 2000–2006: Nodari Simoniya
- 2006-2017: Alexander Dynkin (since 2016 - President)

== Notable people ==
Vladimir Solovyov (TV presenter) - postgraduate studies
