= Aleksandr Dynkin =

Russian economist

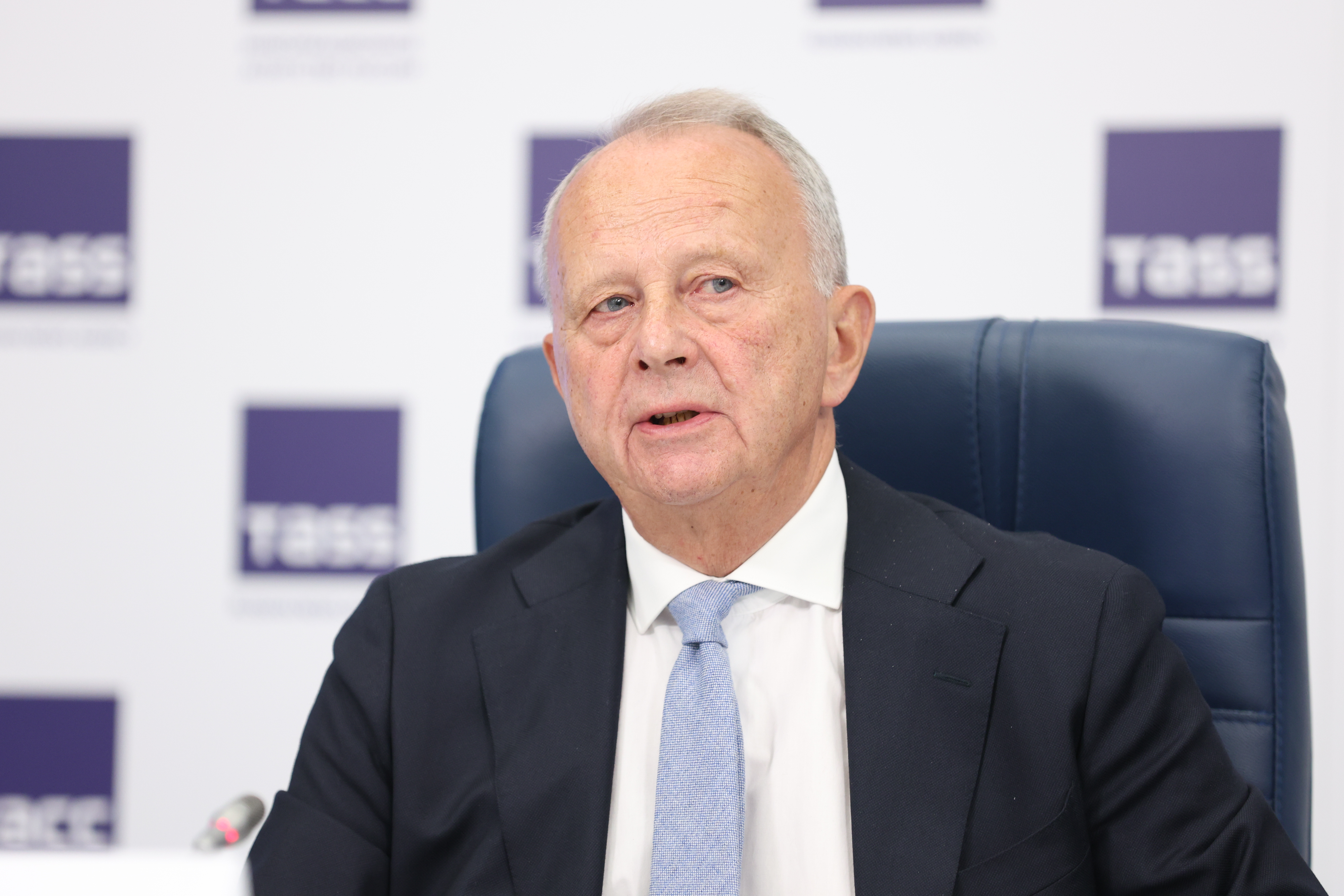
2025

Alexander A. Dynkin (Russian: Александр Александрович Дынкин; born 30 June 1948) is a Russian economist whose research interests and publications have been in growth, forecasting, international comparisons, technological innovation and energy studies. He is the President of the Institute of World Economy and International Relations (IMEMO) (Russian Academy of Science)

== Notability ==
- Elected for life as a full member of the Russian Academy of Science
- Economic adviser to Prime-Minister of Russia (1998-1999)
- 1986 Order of the Sign of Worship
- 2006 Friendship Order
- Keynote Speech at UNIDO's Proceedings of the Industrial Development, Forum and Associated Round Tables, Vienna
