= Institute for US and Canadian Studies =

Russian think tank

Institute of USA and Canada of the Russian Academy of Sciences (ISKRAN)
- Институт США и Канады РАН (ИСКРАН)
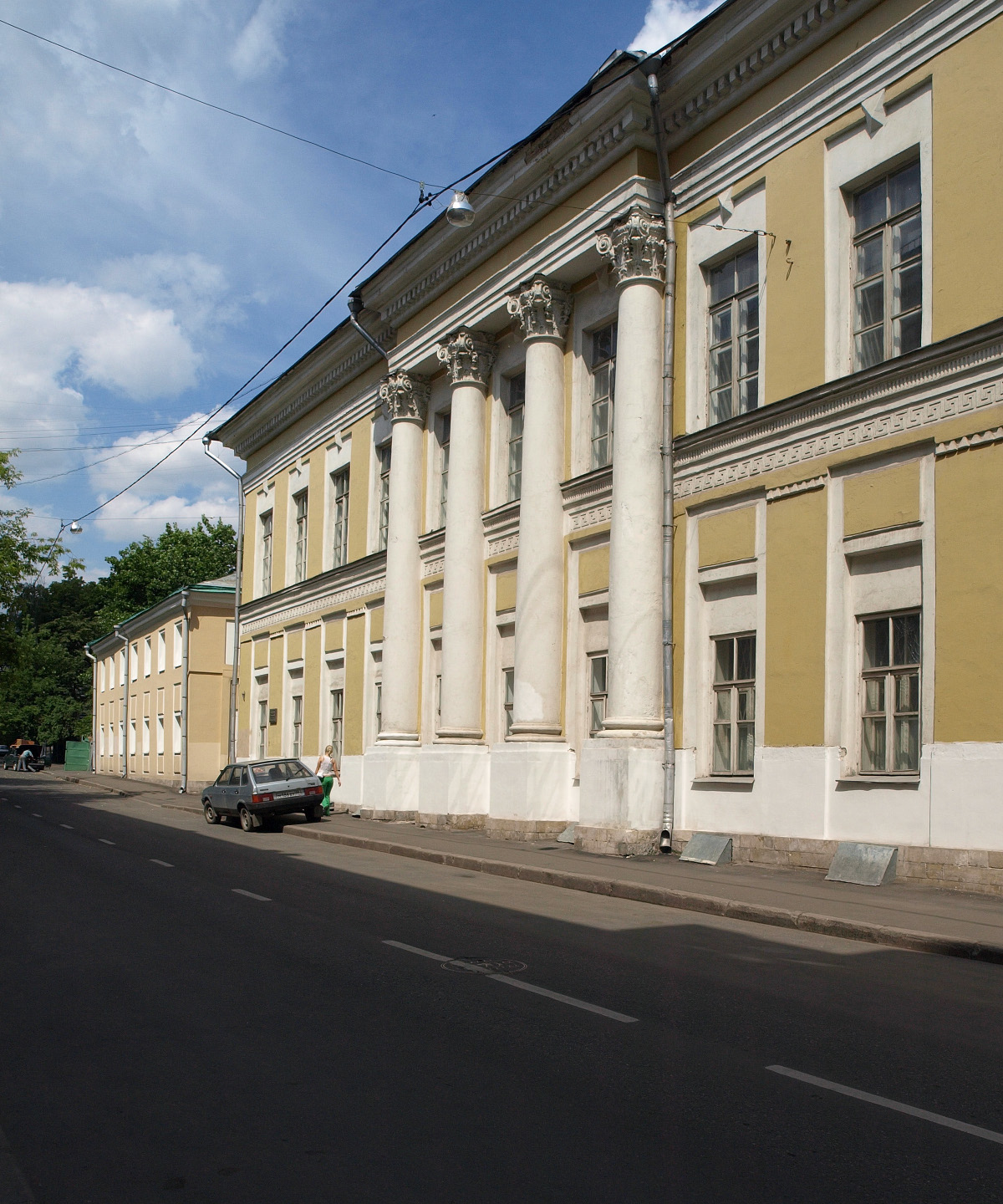
- Type: Public
- Established: 1967
- Director: Dr. Valery Garbuzov
- Location: Moscow, Russia
- Campus: 121069 Moscow Khlebnyy Pereulok 2/3
- Website: http://www.iskran.ru/

The Institute for US and Canadian Studies (Russian: Институт США и Канады РАН, Institut SShA i Kanadi RAN; ИСКРАН) is a Russian think tank which is part of the Russian Academy of Sciences, specializing on the comprehensive studies of the United States and Canada.

The institute continues to publish the monthly journal USA-Canada: Economics, Politics, Culture, which was founded in 1970. The journal is one of the leading Russian foreign policy magazines. It has a strong reputation for thoughtful, analytical, and unbiased articles by major Russian scholars and PhD students.

== History ==
ISKRAN was founded by Dr. Georgy Arbatov in 1967, who led the institute until 1995. Since that time it has been the main Soviet and later Russian center of research of American and Canadian foreign and internal policy.

=== ISKRAN in 1967–1991 ===
Founded in the late 1960s and originally known as the USA Institute, its name was subsequently changed to the US and Canada Institute to reflect an expanded geographic focus. It was one of a number of area studies organizations created by the Soviet government to engage in unfettered research on regional issues; former institute director Georgy Arbatov referred to these organizations as "oases of creative thought".

By the late 1980s, the institute had a staff of 300 specialists and published a monthly scholarly journal, U.S.A.: Economics, Politics, Ideology.

ISKRAN played an important role in the Soviet foreign policy decision making process. Its specialists were responsible for providing unbiased information to Soviet top leaders on the economies, and political and military development of the United States. ISKRAN also included a doctoral department which provided highly competitive scholarships for American studies. ISKRAN specialists were among the architects of Soviet detente policy and later assisted Soviet leaders in preparing all major arms control deals with the United States. The head of the institute, Arbatov, was a personal adviser to Brezhnev, Andropov, Chernenko, and Gorbachev. Since ISKRAN specialists had direct access to the data from the Western bloc, they managed to overcome ideological barriers and to better understand the internal situation in the Soviet Union and the Communist bloc in the late 1970s to early 1980s. Thus ISKRAN was one of the major Soviet institutes initiating and supporting Gorbachev's policy of perestroika in 1985. U.S.-based critics of the US and Canada Institute accused it of being an active measures initiative whose purpose was to spread disinformation in the United States.

=== ISKRAN after 1991 ===
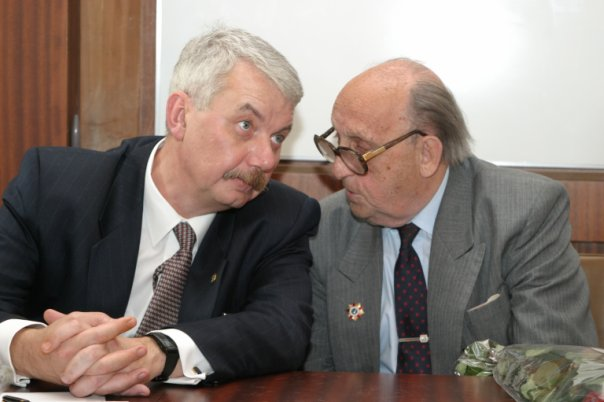
ISKRAN director Dr. Rogov and ISKRAN founder Dr. Arbatov

ISKRAN remained one of the Russian think tanks after the collapse of the Soviet Union. It continued its studies of international political, economic, and military issues. ISKRAN retained its functions of political and economic consultations of major Russian government bodies. Until 2015, the institute was headed by Sergey Rogov.Valery Garbuzov followed as director until 2023; Sergey Kislitsyn briefly until 2025; and, presently, Natalia Tsvetkova heads the think tank. The institute arranges conferences, workshops, and debates on major issues of international relations.

In 2007, ISKRAN was included in a list of the world leading think-tanks.
