= Nikolay Inozemtsev =

Soviet economist, political scientist, and historian (1921–1982)

Nikolay Nikolayevich Inozemtsev (Russian: Никола́й Никола́евич Инозе́мцев: April 4, 1921 – August 12, 1982) was a Soviet economist, political scientist, historian and journalist. He is best remembered as a former Deputy Editor-in-Chief of the Communist Party daily newspaper Pravda and as Director of the prestigious Institute of World Economy and International Relations.

== Biography ==
=== Early years ===
He was born in Moscow.

=== Career ===
Inozemtsev joined the All-Union Communist Party in 1943.

He was a participant in the Great Patriotic War, serving from 1941 to 1945 and earning four decorations, twice receiving the Order of the Red Star.

In 1949 Inozemtszev graduated from the Moscow State Institute of International Relations.

He was Deputy Chairman of Gosplan, the Soviet State Planning Commission. From 1959 to 1961 he was deputy director of the Institute of World Economy and International Relations.

He was a member of the editorial board of the journal Kommunist and in 1961 he became Deputy Editor in Chief of Pravda, where he remained for five years, departing in May 1966 to return as Director of the Institute of World Economy and International Relations.

Inozemtsev was elected to the Academy of Sciences of the Soviet Union in 1968.

Inozemtsev was a recipient of the Order of Lenin.

The 26th Congress of the CPSU in 1981 elected Inozemtsev to membership on the Central Committee of the Communist Party of the Soviet Union. He remained in that capacity until the time of his death.

=== Death and legacy ===
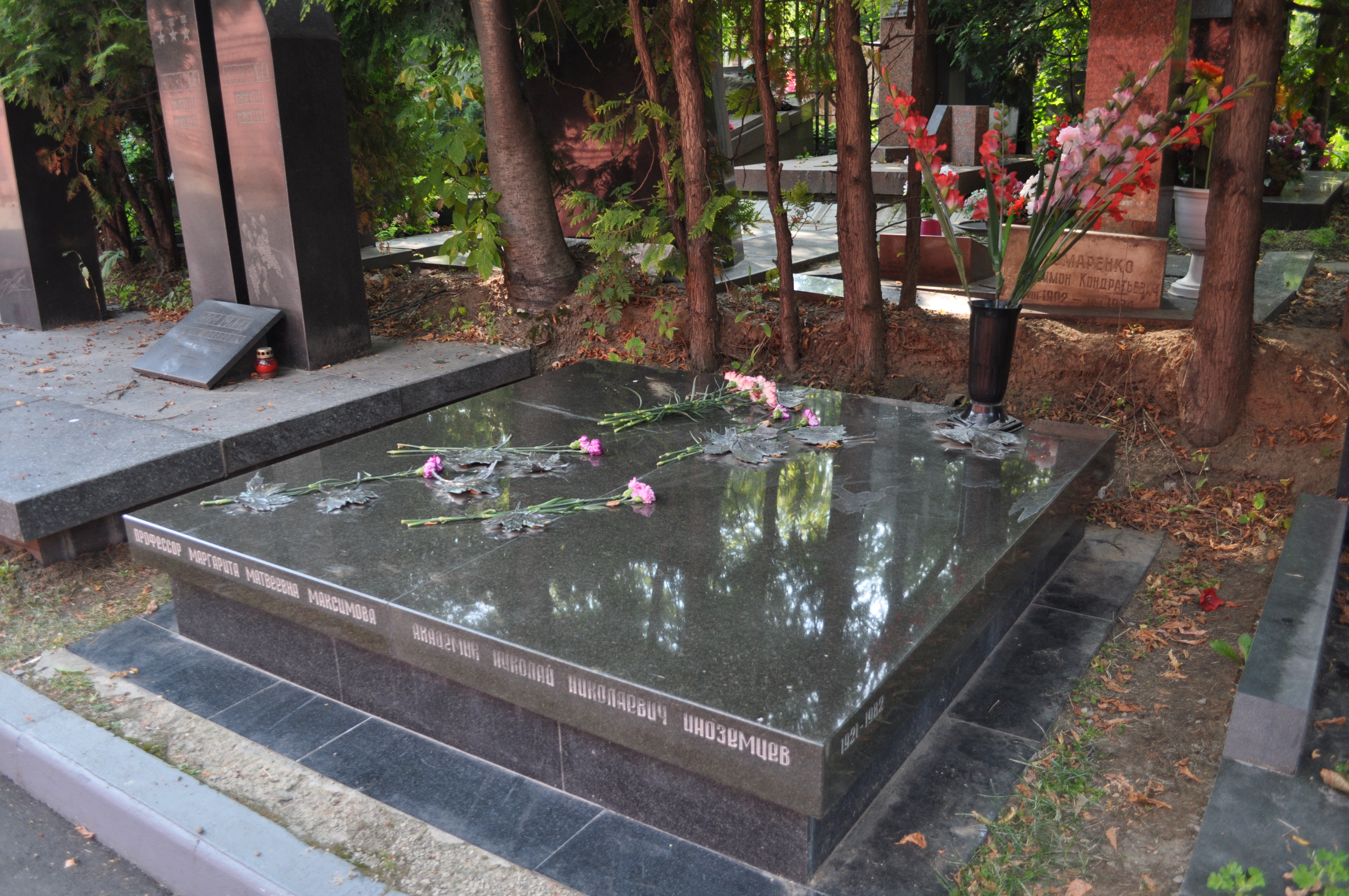
The grave of N. N. Inozemtsev at Moscow’s Novodevichy Cemetery.

Nikolai Inozemtsev died August 12, 1982, in Moscow, aged 61.

== Works ==
- Amerikanskii imperializm i germanskii vopros (1945–1954 gg.) (American Imperialism and the German Question (1945-1954). Moscow, 1954.
- Vneshniaia politika SShA v epokhu imperializma (Foreign Policy of the US in the Epoch of Imperialism). Moscow, 1960.
- Sovremennyi kapitalizm: Novye iavleniia i protivorechiia (Contemporary Capitalism: New Developments and Contradictions). New, Moscow, 1972.
- "Kursom ekonimicheskoi integratsii" (The Course of Economic Integration). Planovoe Khozyaistvoe 8
- "Koordinatsiya narodnokhozyaistvennykh planov stranchlenov SEV: Novye problemy y zadachi", Planovoe Khozyaistvoe 10.
