= Sergey Rogov =

Russian political scientist (1948–2025)

- Сергей Рогов
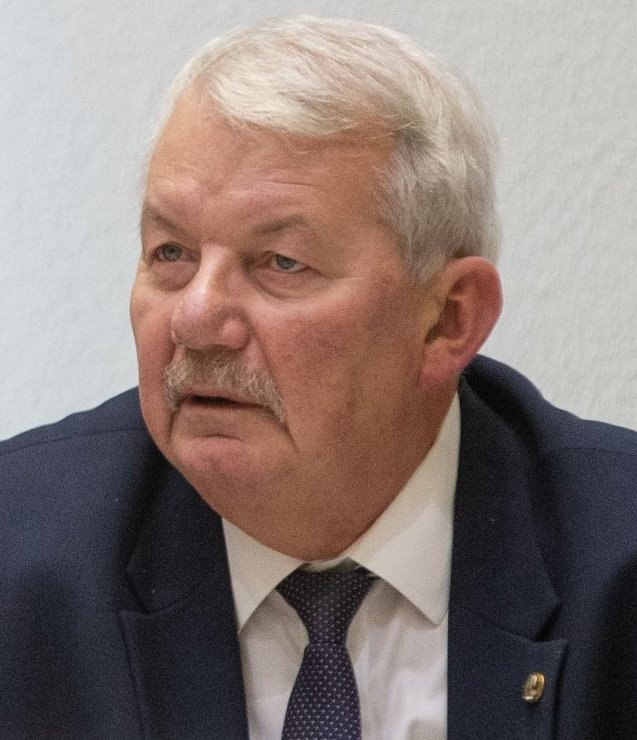
- Rogov in 2018
- Born: Sergey Mikhailovich Rogov; 22 October 1948; Moscow, Russian SFSR, USSR
- Died: 9 February 2025 (aged 76); Moscow, Russia
- Occupation: Director of the Institute for US and Canadian Studies

Sergey Mikhailovich Rogov (Russian: Сергей Михайлович Рогов; 22 October 1948 – 9 February 2025) was a Russian political scientist, member of Russian Academy of Sciences, 1995–2015 director of the Institute for US and Canadian Studies.

== Life and career ==
Rogov was a member of the Economic Council under the Government of the Russian Federation, the Scientific Council under the Security Council until 28 March 2022, when he was excluded therefrom by Vladimir Putin's decree after his speech against the Russian invasion of Ukraine, the Scientific Council under the Ministry of Foreign Affairs of the Russian Federation, the Council of the Russian Foreign Policy Association, the Council of the United Nations Association, and the Russian Pugwash Committee at the Presidium of the Russian Academy of Sciences, as well as being Chairman of the Commission on International Affairs of the Scientific Council of the Federation Council, Advisor to the Committee on International Affairs of the State Duma of the Federal Assembly of the Russian Federation, and President of the Center for National Security and International Relations, a non-governmental public research organization.

Rogov died in Moscow on 9 February 2025, at the age of 76.
