= Soviet of the Union =

Lower house of the Soviet Union's legislature

Soviet of the Union Совет Союза
- Legislative body in the Soviet Union

Type
- Type: Lower House of the Supreme Soviet of the Soviet Union

History
- Established: 1938
- Disbanded: 11 December 1991
- Preceded by: Congress of Soviets
- Succeeded by: Soviet of the Republic; CIS Interparliamentary Assembly

Leadership
- Chairman: Konstantin Lubenchenko (last)

Structure
- Seats: 750
- Political groups: Communist Party of the Soviet Union (551); Independents (199)

Elections
- Voting system: Direct election
- First election: 12 December 1937
- Last election: 4 March 1984

Meeting place
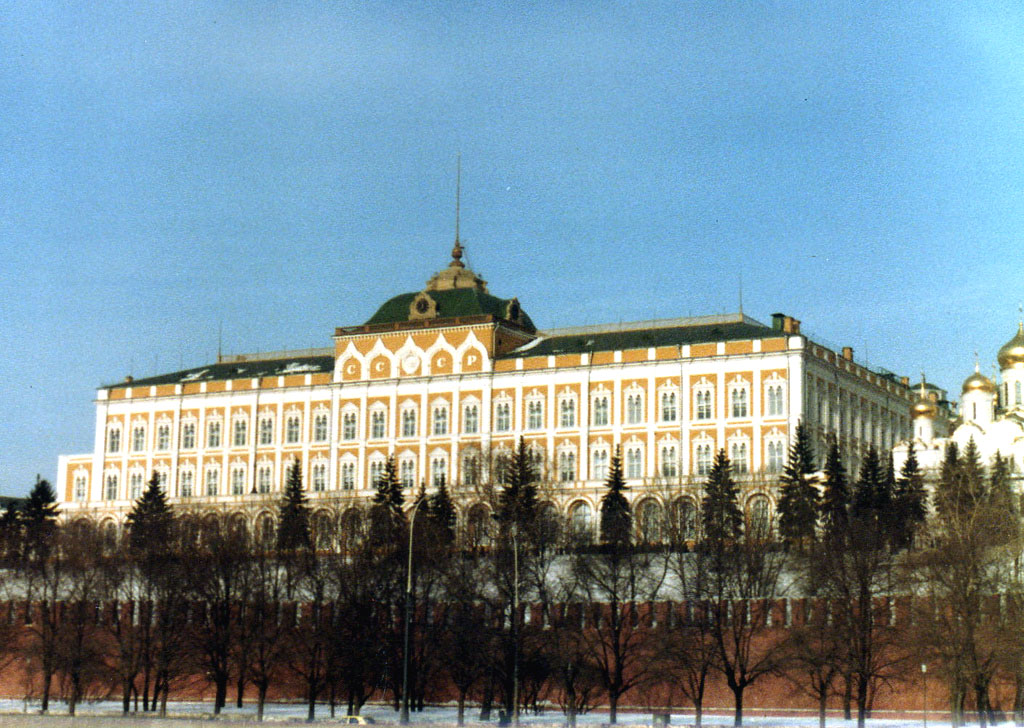
- Grand Kremlin Palace, Moscow Kremlin

The Soviet of the Union (Russian: Совет Союза, romanized: Sovet Soyuza (Note: Ukrainian: Рада Союзу; Belarusian: Савет Саюза; Uzbek: Иттифоқ Кенгаши, Ittifoq Kengashi; Kazakh: Одақ Кеңесі, Odaq Keñesı; Georgian: კავშირის საბჭო; Azerbaijani: Иттифагы Совети, İttifaqı Soveti; Lithuanian: Sąjungos Taryba; Romanian: Sovietul Uniunii, Moldovan Cyrillic: Cоветул Униуний; Latvian: Savienības Padome; Kyrgyz: Бирлик Кеңеши; Tajik: Шӯрои Иттиҳоди; Armenian: Միության Խորհուրդ; Turkmen: Билелешигиң Геңеши, Bileleşigiň Geňeşi; Estonian: Liidu Nõukogu)) was the lower chamber of the Supreme Soviet of the Union of Soviet Socialist Republics, elected on the basis of universal, equal and direct suffrage in accordance with the principles of Soviet democracy, and with the rule that each deputy would represent the same number of voters. Under the 1936 Soviet Constitution, there was one deputy for every 300,000 people; this was changed by the 1977 Soviet Constitution, which provided that both chambers would have an equal number of members. Although the party gave general guidelines on nominations, such as the ratio of the social composition of the nominees, much of the work was left to local bodies and people's representatives. As opposed to the upper chamber, the Soviet of Nationalities, the Soviet of the Union represented the interests of all of the people of the Soviet Union no matter what their nationality was.

The Soviet of the Union had the same rights and competence as the Soviet of Nationalities, including the right for legislative initiative. In practice, until 1989, it did little more than approve decisions already made by the top leadership of the Communist Party of the Soviet Union. After the 1989 elections the Soviet of the Union acquired a much greater role, and was the scene of many lively debates.

The Soviet of the Union elected a chairman (who would lead the sessions of the chamber), his four deputies and permanent commissions: Mandates, Legislative Proposals, Budget Planning, Foreign Affairs, Youth Affairs, Industry, Transportation and Communications, Construction and Industry of Building Materials, Agriculture, Consumer goods, Public Education, Healthcare and Social Security, Science and Culture, Trade, Consumer Service and Municipal Economy, Environment.

In 1989, it was reduced to 271 deputies, elected by the Congress of People's Deputies. Its deputies were elected representing territorial electoral districts and public organizations, taking into account the size of the electorate in a Union Republic or region. In 1991, after the August Coup, it was renamed the Soviet (Council) of the Union, with its deputies apportioned by the existing quotas and in coordination with the bodies of power in the Union Republics. It would consider only issues concerning civil rights and other issues that didn't fall under the Soviet of Nationalities. Its decisions would have to be reviewed by the Soviet of Nationalities.

The Soviet of the Union was effectively dissolved on 12 December 1991, two weeks before the formal dissolution of the Soviet Union, when the Russian Soviet Federative Socialist Republic recalled its deputies, leaving it without a quorum. The legality of this action was questionable, since the Soviet Constitution did not allow a republic to unilaterally recall its deputies. However, by this time what remained of the Soviet government had been rendered more or less impotent and was thus in no position to object. Following the resignation of Soviet President Mikhail Gorbachev, the Soviet of the Republics dissolved the Soviet Union on 26 December 1991, thus dissolving the Soviet of the Union as well.

== See also ==
- List of Chairmen of the Soviet of the Union
- 1977 Soviet Constitution
- 1936 Soviet Constitution
