= Supreme Soviet of the Soviet Union =

Legislative body of the Soviet Union (1938–1991)

Supreme Soviet of the Union of Soviet Socialist Republics Верховный Совет СССР

Type
- Type: Bicameral
- Chambers: Soviet of Nationalities; Soviet of the Union

History
- Established: 12 January 1938; 88 years ago
- Disbanded: 26 December 1991; 34 years ago
- Preceded by: Congress of Soviets
- Succeeded by: Congress of People's Deputies; Interparliamentary Assembly of Member Nations of the Commonwealth of Independent States; Several post-Soviet parliaments: list; Supreme Soviet of Russia; Supreme Council of Belarus; Verkhovna Rada of Ukraine; Supreme Council of Armenia; Supreme Soviet of Azerbaijan; (Georgia (country)) Supreme Council of Georgia; Supreme Soviet of Kazakhstan; Supreme Soviet of Kyrgyzstan; Supreme Soviet of Moldova; Supreme Soviet of Tajikistan; Supreme Soviet of Turkmenistan; Supreme Council of Uzbekistan; Supreme Council of Estonia; Supreme Council of Latvia; Supreme Council of Lithuania

Structure
- Seats: 1,500 (after 1984 election); 542 (at dissolution)
- Soviet of Nationalities political groups: Communist Party of the Soviet Union (521); Independents (229)
- Soviet of the Union political groups: Communist Party of the Soviet Union (551); Independents (199)

Elections
- Soviet of Nationalities voting system: Direct election
- Soviet of the Union voting system: Direct election
- First Soviet of Nationalities election: 12 December 1937
- First Soviet of the Union election: 12 December 1937
- Last Soviet of Nationalities election: 4 March 1984
- Last Soviet of the Union election: 4 March 1984

Meeting place
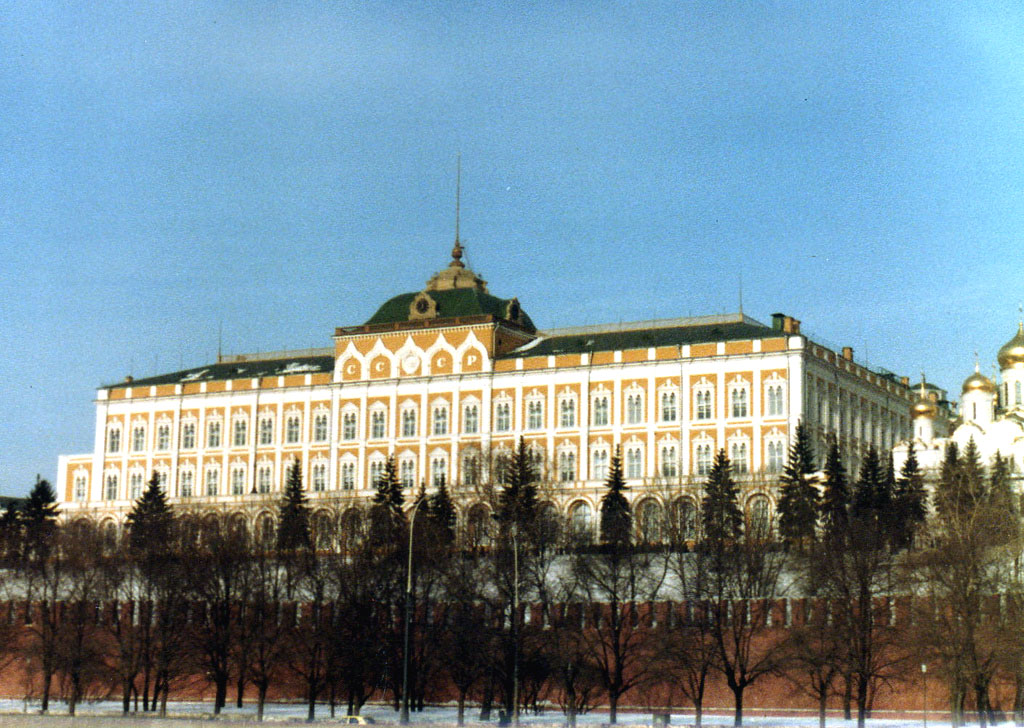
- Grand Kremlin Palace, Moscow Kremlin (Joint sessions of both houses)

The Supreme Soviet of the Union of Soviet Socialist Republics (SSUSSR) (Note: Russian: Верховный Совет Союза Советских Социалистических Республик (ВССССР), romanized: Verhovnyj Sovet Sojuza Sovetskih Socialističeskih Respublik (VSSSSR), IPA: [vʲɪrˈxovnɨj sɐˈvʲet sɐˈjuzə sɐˈvʲetskʲɪx sətsɨəlʲɪˈsʲtʲitɕɪskʲɪx rʲɪˈspublʲɪk (vɛ ɛs ɛs ɛs ɛs ˈɛr)]) was the highest organ of state authority of the Soviet Union from 1936 to 1991. Based on the principle of unified power, it was the only branch of government in the Soviet state, and headed the unified state apparatus.

Prior to 1936, the Congress of Soviets was the highest organ of state authority. During 1989–1991 a similar, but not identical organ acted as the highest organ of state authority. The Supreme Soviet appointed the Council of Ministers, the Supreme Court, and the Procurator General of the Soviet Union as well as elected the Presidium which served as the Soviet Union's collective head of state under both the 1936 and 1977 Soviet Constitutions.

By the Soviet constitutions of 1936 and 1977, the Supreme Soviet was defined as the highest organ of state power in the Soviet Union and was imbued with great lawmaking powers. In practice, however, it was a rubber stamp parliament which did little more than ratify decisions already made by the Soviet Union's executive organs and the Communist Party of the Soviet Union (CPSU) – always by unanimous consent – and listen to the General Secretary's speeches. This was in accordance with the Stalinist CPSU's principle of democratic centralism and became the norm for other Communist legislatures.

== History ==
The Supreme Soviet of the Soviet Union (Верхо́вный Сове́т СССР, Verkhovny Sovet SSSR) was the highest legislative body in the Soviet Union and developed through several distinct phases between 1938 to 1991. It succeeded the Congress of Soviets of the Soviet Union and functioned as the nominal supreme organ of state power according to the 1936 Soviet Constitution.

The 1936 Constitution redesigned Soviet governance by replacing the Congress of Soviets with the Supreme Soviet. The Central Executive Committee of the Congress of Soviets was replaced by the Presidium of the Supreme Soviet, which exercised the full powers of the Supreme Soviet between sessions and held the right to interpret laws.

After its first election in 1937, the Supreme Soviet met for its first session in January 1938. It functioned mainly through brief annual sessions in which legislation, economic plans, and state appointments were approved with little debate. Deputies were elected through single candidate ballots organized by Communist Party controlled organizations, making the institution more ceremonial than deliberative during this period.

The Supreme Soviet replaced the Congress of Soviets in 1938 and was theoretically the highest authority in the USSR. In practice, however, it usually rubber-stamped decisions made by the Communist Party and its Politburo.

During the German invasion of the Soviet Union in 1941, legislative authority largely shifted to emergency organs such as the State Defense Committee (GKO). The Supreme Soviet continued to exist but met infrequently, reflecting the concentration of wartime decision making in executive and part leadership structures.

In the decades after the war, The Supreme Soviet's sessions formally ratified national economic plans, treaties, and changes to the union republic structure. Deputies often represented trade unions, collective farms, or professional groups, reflecting the Soviet concept of representation through social organizations rather than competitive political parties.

Beginning in the Khrushchev and Brezhnev periods, standing committees of the Supreme Soviet became somewhat more active in reviewing draft legislation and supervising ministries. Although these committees still operated under party oversight, they provided a limited forum for policy discussion among officials and specialists alike.

Although the Supreme Soviet was formally the highest organ of state power, real authority rested with the Communist Party until Mikhail Gorbachev's reforms in the late 1980s. Under perestroika, it became a somewhat genuine parliamentary body after the creation of the Congress of People's Deputies of the Soviet Union in 1989, from which the Supreme Soviet was elected as a smaller working legislature.

The last session of the Supreme Soviet was held in December 1991, shortly before the formal dissolution of the USSR.

== Structure ==
The Supreme Soviet was composed of two chambers, each with equal legislative powers:

- The Soviet of the Union, which represented the population of the Soviet federation as a whole, with each deputy representing the same number of voters.
- The Soviet of Nationalities, which represented the ethnic populations as units, with members elected on the basis of 32 deputies from each union republic, 11 from each autonomous republic, five from each autonomous oblast (region), and one from each autonomous okrug (district). The administrative units of the same type would send the same number of members regardless of their size or population.

Under the 1936 Constitution, the Supreme Soviet was elected for a four-year term, and the Soviet of the Union had one deputy for every 300,000 people. This was changed by the 1977 constitution; the term was extended to five years, and the number of seats in the Soviet of the Union was changed to be the same as the Soviet of Nationalities, regardless of the population size.

The Supreme Soviet convened twice a year, usually for less than a week. For the rest of the year, the Presidium performed its ordinary functions. Often, the CPSU bypassed the Supreme Soviet altogether and had major laws enacted as Presidium decrees. Nominally, if such decrees were not ratified by the Supreme Soviet at its next session, they were considered revoked. In practice, however, the principle of democratic centralism rendered the process of ratifying Presidium decrees a mere formality. In some cases, even this formality was not observed.

After 1989 it consisted of 542 deputies (divided into two 271 chambers) decreased from a previous 1,500. The meetings of the Supreme Soviet were also more frequent, from six to eight months a year. In September 1991, after the August Coup, it was reorganised into the Soviet (council) of Republics and the Soviet of The Union, which would jointly amend the Soviet Constitution, admit new states, hear out the President of the Soviet Union on important home and foreign policy issues, approve the union budget, declare war and conclude peace. The Soviet of Republics would consist of 20 deputies from each union republic, plus one deputy to represent each autonomous region of each republic, delegated by the republics' legislatures. Russia was an exception with 52 deputies. The Soviet of the Union consisted of deputies apportioned by the existing quotas.

== Powers ==
The Supreme Soviet had authority to:

- Enact laws and amend the Constitution of the Soviet Union.
- Elect the Presidium of the Supreme Soviet, which acted as a collective head of state between sessions.
- Appoint the Council of Ministers (executive branch).
- Ratify international treaties and approve economic plans.

Sessions were generally short, held twice a year, with most legislative work done by standing commissions or the Presidium.

Between sessions, its powers were exercised by the Presidium of the Supreme Soviet, which could issue decrees (ukazy) with the force of law, subject to later approval.

In 1988, the constitution was amended to create a new body, the Congress of People's Deputies, with many of the powers formerly assigned to the Supreme Soviet. The Congress also served as an electoral college with the duty to elect the Supreme Soviet, which accordingly became a subsidiary of the new body, in a relationship somewhat similar to the Supreme Soviet's own relationship with its Presidium.

By 1989, its powers were:

- Passing and initiating laws.
- Submitting questions to the President of the Soviet Union, the Council of Ministers of the Soviet Union, scheduling elections of deputies.
- Convening the Congress of People's Deputies.
- Appointing the Chairman of the Council of Ministers on the submission of the President.
- Ratifying the composition of the Council of Ministers and changes in it on the submission on the Chairman.
- Forming and disbanding ministries and state committees on the proposal of the Council of Ministers.
- Overriding a presidential veto with a two-thirds majority.
- Ratifying presidential declarations of war.
- Impeaching the President.
- Hearing reports by organs of appointed officials.
- Implementing laws regulating property, management of the economy, social and cultural issues, budget and finance, salaries, prices, taxes, environmental protection, natural resource, and civil rights,
- Laying down the principals of local and republic state power and the legal status of social organisations,
- Submitting for ratification (and ratifying and amending) by the congress long-term national and social and economic development plans, the national budget, monitoring implantation of the state plan and budget, and ratifying reports on their performance.
- Ratifying international treaties.
- Overseeing the granting of foreign aid and negotiating foreign loans.
- Determining basic measures for national security, including declarations of war, mobilizing troops, and meeting international treaty obligations.

Acts by the Supreme Soviet entered into force after signature by the President and their subsequent publication.

Between 1938 and February 1990, more than 50 years, only 80 laws were passed by the Supreme Soviet, less than 1% of total legislative acts.

== Leaders ==
=== Chairman of the Presidium of the Supreme Soviet (1938–1989) ===
| No. | Portrait | Name (Born-Died) | Term of office | | |
| No. | Portrait | Name (Born-Died) | Took office | Left office | Time in office |
|---|---|---|---|---|---|
| 1 | Mikhail Kalinin | Mikhail Kalinin (1875–1946) | 17 January 1938 | 19 March 1946 | 8 years, 61 days |
| 2 | Nikolai Shvernik | Nikolai Shvernik (1888–1970) | 19 March 1946 | 15 March 1953 | 6 years, 361 days |
| 3 | Kliment Voroshilov | Kliment Voroshilov (1881–1969) | 15 March 1953 | 7 May 1960 | 7 years, 53 days |
| 4 | Leonid Brezhnev | Leonid Brezhnev (1906–1982) | 7 May 1960 | 15 July 1964 | 4 years, 69 days |
| 5 | Anastas Mikoyan | Anastas Mikoyan (1895–1978) | 15 July 1964 | 9 December 1965 | 1 year, 147 days |
| 6 | Nikolai Podgorny | Nikolai Podgorny (1903–1983) | 9 December 1965 | 16 June 1977 | 11 years, 189 days |
| (4) | Leonid Brezhnev | Leonid Brezhnev (1906–1982) | 16 June 1977 | 10 November 1982 † | 5 years, 147 days |
| – | Vasili Kuznetsov | Vasili Kuznetsov (1901–1990); Acting | 10 November 1982 | 16 June 1983 | 218 days |
| 7 | Yuri Andropov | Yuri Andropov (1914–1984) | 16 June 1983 | 9 February 1984 † | 238 days |
| – | Vasili Kuznetsov | Vasili Kuznetsov (1901–1990); Acting | 9 February 1984 | 11 April 1984 | 62 days |
| 8 | Konstantin Chernenko | Konstantin Chernenko (1911–1985) | 11 April 1984 | 10 March 1985 † | 333 days |
| – | Vasili Kuznetsov | Vasili Kuznetsov (1901–1990); Acting | 10 March 1985 | 27 July 1985 | 139 days |
| 9 | Andrei Gromyko | Andrei Gromyko (1909–1989) | 27 July 1985 | 1 October 1988 | 3 years, 66 days |
| 10 | Mikhail Gorbachev | Mikhail Gorbachev (1931–2022) | 1 October 1988 | 25 May 1989 | 236 days |

=== Chairmen of the Supreme Soviet (1989–1991) ===
| No. | Portrait | Name (Born-Died) | Term of office | | |
| No. | Portrait | Name (Born-Died) | Took office | Left office | Time in office |
|---|---|---|---|---|---|
| 1 | Mikhail Gorbachev | Mikhail Gorbachev (1931–2022) | 25 May 1989 | 15 March 1990 | 294 days |
| 2 | Anatoly Lukyanov | Anatoly Lukyanov (1930–2019) | 15 March 1990 | 4 September 1991 | 1 year, 160 days |

== Convocations ==
- 1st convocation session 1938–1946, World War II (elections on 12 December 1937)
  - 1,143 (initially, 569 to the Soviet of the Union and 574 to the Soviet of Nationalities)
  - 387 (added, after annexation of Baltic states, eastern Poland, and eastern Romania)
  - 6 (added following World War II and annexation of Tuva)
- 2nd convocation session 1946–1950 (elections on 10 February 1946)
  - 1339 (initially)
  - 48 (added)
- 3rd convocation session 1950–1954 (elections on 12 March 1950)
  - 1,316 (initially)
  - 48 (added)
- 4th convocation session 1954–1958 (elections on 14 March 1954)
  - 1,347 (initially)
  - 33 (added)
- 5th convocation session 1958–1962 (elections on 16 March 1958)
  - 1,378 (initially)
- 6th convocation session 1962–1966 (elections on 18 March 1962)
  - 1,443 (initially)
- 7th convocation session 1966–1970 (elections on 12 June 1966)
  - 1,517 (initially)
- 8th convocation session 1970–1974 (elections on 14 June 1970)
  - 1,517
- 9th convocation session 1974–1979 (elections on 16 June 1974)
  - 1,517
- 10th convocation session 1979–1984 (elections on 4 March 1979)
  - 1,500
- 11th convocation session 1984–1989 (elections on 4 March 1984)
  - 1,500
- 1st convocation 1989–1991 (26 March — 21 May 1989, unofficially 12th convocation), sessions were conducted in the form of Congress of People's Deputies of the Soviet Union
  - 2,250
- New composition 1991, (unofficially 13th convocation) unlike previous convocations, there were no elections for the new composition of the Supreme Council instead members of the council were delegated from the council of union republics that continued to be members of the Soviet Union.

== Supreme Soviets of the republics ==
Beside the Supreme Soviet of the Soviet Union, each of its constituting union republics and each autonomous republic had a supreme soviet. These supreme soviets also had presidiums, but all consisted of only one chamber. After the dissolution of the Soviet Union, some soviets of the succeeded independent republics simply changed their name to their more historic name or to emphasise their importance as a national parliament, while others changed to double-chamber assemblies.

=== Supreme soviets of the union republics ===
Soviet Republics dissolved before the dissolution of the Soviet Union Parliaments not formally recognized by some countries such as the Western Bloc

| Emblem | Soviet Republic | Supreme Soviet | Established | Disbanded | Succeeded by |
|---|---|---|---|---|---|
| | (Russian Soviet Federative Socialist Republic) /Russia | Supreme Soviet of the Russian SFSR; Congress of People's Deputies of the Russian SFSR Верховный Совет РСФСР; Съезд народных депутатов РСФСР | 1938 (Supreme Soviet of Russia); 1990 (Congress of People's Deputies of Russia) | 1993 | (Russia) Constitutional Conference (1993) (Russia) Federal Assembly (1993–present): • Federation Council • State Duma |
| | Ukraine | Supreme Soviet of the Ukrainian SSR Верховный Совет Украинской ССР; Верховна Рада Української РСР | 1937 | 1991 (De facto); 1996 (De jure) | (Ukraine) / (Ukraine) Verkhovna Rada |
| | Byelorussia | Supreme Soviet of the Byelorussian SSR Верховный Совет Белорусской ССР; Вярхоўны Савет Беларускай ССР | 1938 | 1991 (De facto); 1994 (De jure) | (Belarus) / (Belarus) Supreme Council (1994–96) (Belarus) / (Belarus) National Assembly (1996–present) |
| | Uzbekistan | Supreme Soviet of the Uzbek SSR Верховный Совет Узбекской ССР; Ўзбекистон ССР Олий Совети | 1938 | 1991 | (Uzbekistan) Supreme Council (1991–1995) (Uzbekistan) Oliy Majlis (1995–present) |
| | Kazakhstan | Supreme Soviet of the Kazakh SSR Верховный Совет Казахской ССР; Қазақ ССР Жоғарғы Советі | 1937 | 1993 | (Kazakhstan) Supreme Council (1993–95) (Kazakhstan) Parliament (1995–present) |
| | Georgia | Supreme Soviet of the Georgian SSR Верховный Совет Грузинской ССР საქართველოს სსრ უმაღლესი საბჭო | 1938 | 1990 | (Georgia (country)) Supreme Council (1990–1992) (Georgia (country)) Military Council/State Council (1992–1995) (Georgia (country)) / (Georgia (country)) Parliament (1995–present) |
| | (Azerbaijan Soviet Socialist Republic) /Azerbaijan | Supreme Soviet of the Azerbaijan SSR Верховный Совет Азербайджа́нской ССР; Азәрбаjҹан ССР Али Совети | 1938 | 1995 | (Azerbaijan) / (Azerbaijan) National Assembly |
| | Lithuania | Supreme Soviet of the Lithuanian SSR Верховный Совет Литовской ССР; Lietuvos TSR Aukščiausioji Taryba | 1940 | 1990 | (Lithuania) Supreme Council (1990–1992) (Lithuania) Seimas (1992–present) |
| | Moldavia | Supreme Soviet of the Moldavian SSR Верховный Совет Молдавской ССР; Совиетул Супрем ал РСС Молдовеняскэ (Moldovan); Sovietul Suprem al RSS Moldovenească (Romanian) | 1941 | 1993 | (Moldova) Parliament |
| | Latvia | Supreme Soviet of the Latvian SSR Верховный Совет Латвийской ССР; Latvijas PSR Augstākā Padome | 1940 | 1990 | (Latvia) Supreme Council (1990–1993) (Latvia) Saeima (1993–present) |
| | Kirghizia | Supreme Soviet of the Kirghiz SSR Верховный Совет Киргизской ССР; Кыргыз ССР Жогорку Совети | 1938 | 1994 | (Kyrgyzstan) / (Kyrgyzstan) Supreme Council |
| | Tajikistan | Supreme Soviet of the Tajik SSR Верховный Совет Таджикской ССР; Совети Олӣ РСС Тоҷикистон | 1937 | 1994 | (Tajikistan) Supreme Assembly |
| | (Armenian Soviet Socialist Republic) /Armenia | Supreme Soviet of the Armenian SSR Верховный Совет Армянской ССР; Հայկական ՍՍՀ Գերագույն Խորհուրդ | 1938 | 1995 | (Armenia) National Assembly |
| | Turkmenistan | Supreme Soviet of the Turkmen SSR Верховный Совет Туркменской ССР; Түркменистан ССР Ёкары Советы | 1938 | 1992 | (Turkmenistan) / (Turkmenistan) / (Turkmenistan) Assembly (1992–2021, 2023–present) (Turkmenistan) National Council (2021–2023) |
| | Estonia | Supreme Soviet of the Estonian SSR Верховный Совет Эстонской ССР; Eesti NSV Ülemnõukogu | 1940 | 1992 | (Estonia) Riigikogu |
| | Karelo-Finnish SSR | Supreme Soviet of the Karelo-Finnish SSR Верховный Совет Карело-Финской ССР; Karjalais-suomalainen SNT:n Korkein Neuvosto | 1940 | 1956 | (Republic of Karelia) Supreme Soviet |

=== Supreme soviets of the autonomous republics ===
List of known autonomous republics councils:

| Emblem | Autonomous Republic | Supreme Soviet | Established | Disbanded | Succeeded by |
|---|---|---|---|---|---|
| | Bashkiria | Supreme Soviet of the Bashkir ASSR Верховный Совет Башкирской АССР; Башҡорт АССР-ы Юғары Советы | 1938 | 1995 | (Russia) (Bashkortostan) / (Russia) (Bashkortostan) State Assembly |
| | Buryatia | Supreme Soviet of the Buryat ASSR Верховный Совет Бурятской АССР; Буряадай АССР-эй Верховно Совет | 1938 | 1994 | (Russia) (Buryatia) People's Khural |
| | Dagestan | Supreme Soviet of the Dagestan ASSR; Congress of People's Deputies of the Dagestan ASSR Верховный Совет Дагестанской АССР; Съезд народных депутатов Дагестанской АССР | 1938 | 1994 | (Russia) (Dagestan) / (Russia) (Dagestan) People's Assembly |
| | Kalmykia | Supreme Soviet of the Kalmyk ASSR Верховный Совет Калмыцкой АССР; Хальмг АССР-ин Деед Совет | 1938; 1958 | 1943; 1994 | (Russia) (Kalmykia) / (Russia) (Kalmykia) People's Khural |
| | Karelia | Supreme Soviet of the Karelian ASSR Верховный Совет Карельской АССР; Karjalan ASNT:n Korkein Neuvosto | 1938; 1956 | 1940; 1994 | (Russia) (Republic of Karelia) Legislative Assembly |
| | Komi | Supreme Soviet of the Komi ASSR Верховный Совет Коми АССР; Коми АССР-са Верховнӧй Сӧвет | 1938 | 1994 | (Russia) (Komi Republic) / (Russia) (Komi Republic) State Council |
| | Mari | Supreme Soviet of the Mari ASSR Верховный Совет Марийской АССР; Марий АССР Верховный Совет | 1938 | 1994 | (Russia) (Mari El) / (Russia) (Mari El) State Assembly |
| | Mordovia | Supreme Soviet of the Mordovian ASSR Верховный Совет Мордовской АССР; Мордовскяй АССР-нь Верховнай Совет; Мордовской АССР-нь Верховной Совет | 1938 | 1995 | (Russia) (Mordovia) / (Russia) (Mordovia) State Assembly |
| | North Ossetia | Supreme Soviet of the North Ossetian ASSR Верховный Совет Северо-Осетинской АССР; Цӕгат Ирыстоны ACCP-Йы Сӕйраг Совет | 1938 | 1994 | (Russia) (North Ossetia–Alania) / (Russia) (North Ossetia–Alania) Parliament |
| | Tatarstan | Supreme Soviet of the Tatar ASSR Верховный Совет Татарской АССР; Татарстан АССР Югары Советы | 1938 | 1995 | (Russia) (Tatarstan) State Council |
| | Tuva | Supreme Soviet of the Tuvan ASSR Верховный Совет Тувинской АССР; Тыва АССР-ниң Дээди Соведи | 1962 | 1993 | (Russia) (Tuva) / (Russia) (Tuva) Great Khural |
| | Udmurtia | Supreme Soviet of the Udmurt ASSR Верховный Совет Удмуртской АССР; Удмурт АССР-лэн Верховной Советэз | 1938 | 1994 | (Russia) (Udmurtia) State Council |
| | Checheno-Ingushetia | Supreme Soviet of the Checheno-Ingush ASSR Верховный Совет Чечено-Ингушской АССР | 1938; 1957 | 1944; 1991 | (Chechen Republic of Ichkeria) Parliament of the Chechen; Republic of Ichkeria (1991–2000) (Russia) (Chechnya) Parliament of the Chechen Republic (2003–present) (Russia) / (Russia) People's Assembly of the Republic of Ingushetia (1994–present) |
| | Chuvashia | Supreme Soviet of the Chuvash ASSR Верховный Совет Чувашской АССР; Чӑваш АССР Верховнӑй Совечӗ | 1938 | 1994 | (Russia) (Chuvashia) State Council |
| | Yakutia | Supreme Soviet of the Yakut ASSR Верховный Совет Якутской АССР; Саха АССР Верховнай Совета | 1938 | 1993 | (Russia) (Sakha Republic) State Assembly |
| | Karakalpakstan | Supreme Soviet of the Karakalpak ASSR Верховный Совет Каракалпакской АССР; Қорақалпоғистон АССР Олий Совети; Қарақалпақстан АССР Жоқарғы Совети | 1938 | 1994 | (Uzbekistan) (Karakalpakstan) Supreme Council |
| | Abkhazia | Supreme Soviet of the Abkhaz ASSR Верховный Совет Абхазской АССР აფხაზეთის ასსრ უმაღლესი საბჭო Аҧснытәи АССР Иреиҳаӡоу Асовет | 1938 | 1996 | (Abkhazia) People's Assembly |
| | Adjara | Supreme Soviet of the Adjarian ASSR Верховный Совет Аджарской АССР აჭარის ასსრ უმაღლესი საბჭო | 1938 | 1991 | (Georgia (country)) (Adjara) / (Georgia (country)) (Adjara) Supreme Council |
| | Nakhichevan | Supreme Soviet of the Nakhichevan ASSR Верховный Совет Нахичеванской АССР; Нахчыван МССР Али Совети | 1938 | 1990 | (Azerbaijan) / (Azerbaijan) Supreme Assembly (Nakhchivan) |

== See also ==
- Soviet of the Union
- Soviet of Nationalities
- Congress of People's Deputies of the Soviet Union
- Supreme Soviet
- Presidium of the Supreme Soviet of the Soviet Union
- Politics of the Soviet Union
- All-Russian Central Executive Committee
- Supreme Soviet of Russia
- Federal Assembly of Russia
- National People's Congress – Chinese equivalent
- Supreme People's Assembly – North Korean equivalent
- National Assembly of People's Power – Cuban equivalent
- National Assembly (Laos) – Laotian equivalent
- National Assembly (Vietnam) – Vietnamese equivalent
- Volkskammer – East German equivalent
- Federal Assembly – Czechoslovak equivalent
