= List of leaders of the Russian Soviet Federative Socialist Republic =

Presidents of the Russian SFSR
- Emblem of the Russian SFSR
- Formation: 9 November 1917; 108 years ago
- First holder: Lev Kamenev
- Final holder: Boris Yeltsin
- Abolished: 25 December 1991; 34 years ago

The following is a list of presidents of the Russian Soviet Federative Socialist Republic (Russian SFSR). It lists heads of state, heads of government, and heads of the local branch of the Communist Party of the Soviet Union. Commonly referred to as Soviet Russia or simply Russia, the Russian SFSR was a sovereign state in 1917–1922, the largest, most populous, and most economically developed republic of the Soviet Union in 1922–1991, having its own legislation within the Union in 1990–91.

== List of presidents ==
No.	Portrait	Name (Birth–Death)	Term of office		Political party
No.	Portrait	Name (Birth–Death)	Took office	Left office	Political party
Chairman of the Central Executive Committee of the All-Russian Congress of Soviets (1917–1938)
1		Lev Kamenev (1883–1936)	9 November 1917	21 November 1917	Communist Party
2		Yakov Sverdlov (1885–1919)	21 November 1917	16 March 1919	Communist Party
—		Mikhail Vladimirsky (1874–1951); Acting	16 March 1919	30 March 1919	Communist Party
5		Mikhail Kalinin (1875–1946)	30 March 1919	15 July 1938	Communist Party
Chairman of the Supreme Soviet of the Russian SFSR (1938)
6		Andrei Zhdanov (1896–1948)	15 July 1938	19 July 1938	Communist Party
Chairman of the Presidium of the Supreme Soviet of the Russian SFSR (1938–1990)
7		Aleksei Badayev (1883–1951)	19 July 1938	9 April 1943	Communist Party
—		Ivan Vlasov (1903–1969); Acting	9 April 1943	4 March 1944	Communist Party
8		Nikolai Shvernik (1888–1970)	4 March 1944	25 June 1946	Communist Party
9		Ivan Vlasov (1903–1969)	25 June 1946	7 July 1950	Communist Party
10		Mikhail Tarasov (1899–1970)	7 July 1950	16 April 1959	Communist Party
11		Nikolai Ignatov (1901–1966)	16 April 1959	26 November 1959	Communist Party
12		Nikolai Organov (1901–1982)	26 November 1959	20 December 1962	Communist Party
(11)		Nikolai Ignatov (1901–1966)	20 December 1962	14 November 1966	Communist Party
13		Mikhail Yasnov (1906–1991)	23 December 1966	26 March 1985	Communist Party
14		Vladimir Orlov (1921–1999)	26 March 1985	3 October 1988	Communist Party
15		Vitaly Vorotnikov (1926–2012)	3 October 1988	29 May 1990	Communist Party
Chairman of the Supreme Soviet of the Russian SFSR (1990–1991)
16		Boris Yeltsin (1931–2007)	29 May 1990	10 July 1991	Independent
President of the Russian SFSR (1991)
(16)		Boris Yeltsin (1931–2007)	10 July 1991	25 December 1991	Independent

== Heads of government ==
No.	Portrait	Name (Birth–Death)	Term of Office		Political Party
No.	Portrait	Name (Birth–Death)	Took office	Left office	Political Party
Chairman of the Council of People's Commissars of the Russian SFSR (1917–1946)
1		Vladimir Lenin (1870–1924)	8 November 1917	21 January 1924	Communist Party
2		Alexei Rykov (1881–1938)	2 February 1924	18 May 1929	Communist Party
3		Sergei Syrtsov (1893–1937)	18 May 1929	3 November 1930	Communist Party
4		Daniil Sulimov (1890–1937)	3 November 1930	22 July 1937	Communist Party
5		Nikolai Bulganin (1895–1975)	22 July 1937	17 September 1938	Communist Party
6		Vasily Vakhrushev (1902–1947)	29 July 1939	2 June 1940	Communist Party
7		Ivan Khokhlov (1895–1973)	2 June 1940	23 June 1943	Communist Party
8		Alexei Kosygin (1904–1980)	23 June 1943	23 March 1946	Communist Party
Chairman of the Council of Ministers of the Russian SFSR (1946–1991)
9		Mikhail Rodionov (1907–1950)	23 March 1946	9 March 1949	Communist Party
10		Boris Chernousov (1908–1978)	9 March 1949	20 October 1952	Communist Party
11		Alexander Puzanov (1906–1998)	20 October 1952	24 January 1956	Communist Party
12		Mikhail Yasnov (1906–1991)	24 January 1956	19 December 1957	Communist Party
13		Frol Kozlov (1908–1965)	19 December 1957	31 March 1958	Communist Party
14		Dmitry Polyansky (1917–2001)	31 March 1958	23 November 1962	Communist Party
15		Gennady Voronov (1910–1994)	23 November 1962	23 July 1971	Communist Party
16		Mikhail Solomentsev (1913–2008)	28 July 1971	24 June 1983	Communist Party
17		Vitaly Vorotnikov (1926–2012)	24 June 1983	3 October 1988	Communist Party
18		Aleksandr Vlasov (1932–2002)	3 October 1988	15 June 1990	Communist Party
19		Ivan Silayev (1930–2023)	18 June 1990	26 September 1991	Communist Party
—		Oleg Lobov (1937–2018); Acting	26 September 1991	15 November 1991	Communist Party
President of the Russian SFSR as extraordinary head of the Government (1991)
—		Boris Yeltsin (1931–2007)	6 November 1991	25 December 1991	Independent

== Heads of party ==
No.	Portrait	Name (Birth–Death)	Term of Office		Political Party
No.	Portrait	Name (Birth–Death)	Took office	Left office	Political Party
Chairman of the Bureau of the CPSU Central Committee for the RSFSR (1956–1966)
1		Nikita Khrushchev (1894–1971)	27 February 1956	16 November 1964	Communist Party
2		Leonid Brezhnev (1906–1982)	16 November 1964	8 April 1966	Communist Party
Chairman of the Russian Bureau of the CPSU Central Committee (1989–1990)
3		Mikhail Gorbachev (1931–2022)	9 December 1989	16 June 1990	Communist Party
On June 16, 1990, the provision on the monopoly of the CPSU on power was excluded from Article 6 of the Constitution of the RSFSR

== See also ==
- List of heads of state of Russia
- List of heads of government of Russia
- List of leaders of the Soviet Union
- List of heads of state of the Soviet Union
- Premier of the Soviet Union
