= 1951 Russian Supreme Soviet election =

- 18 February 1951

All 763 seats in the Supreme Soviet of the Russian SFSR
- Turnout: 99.98%
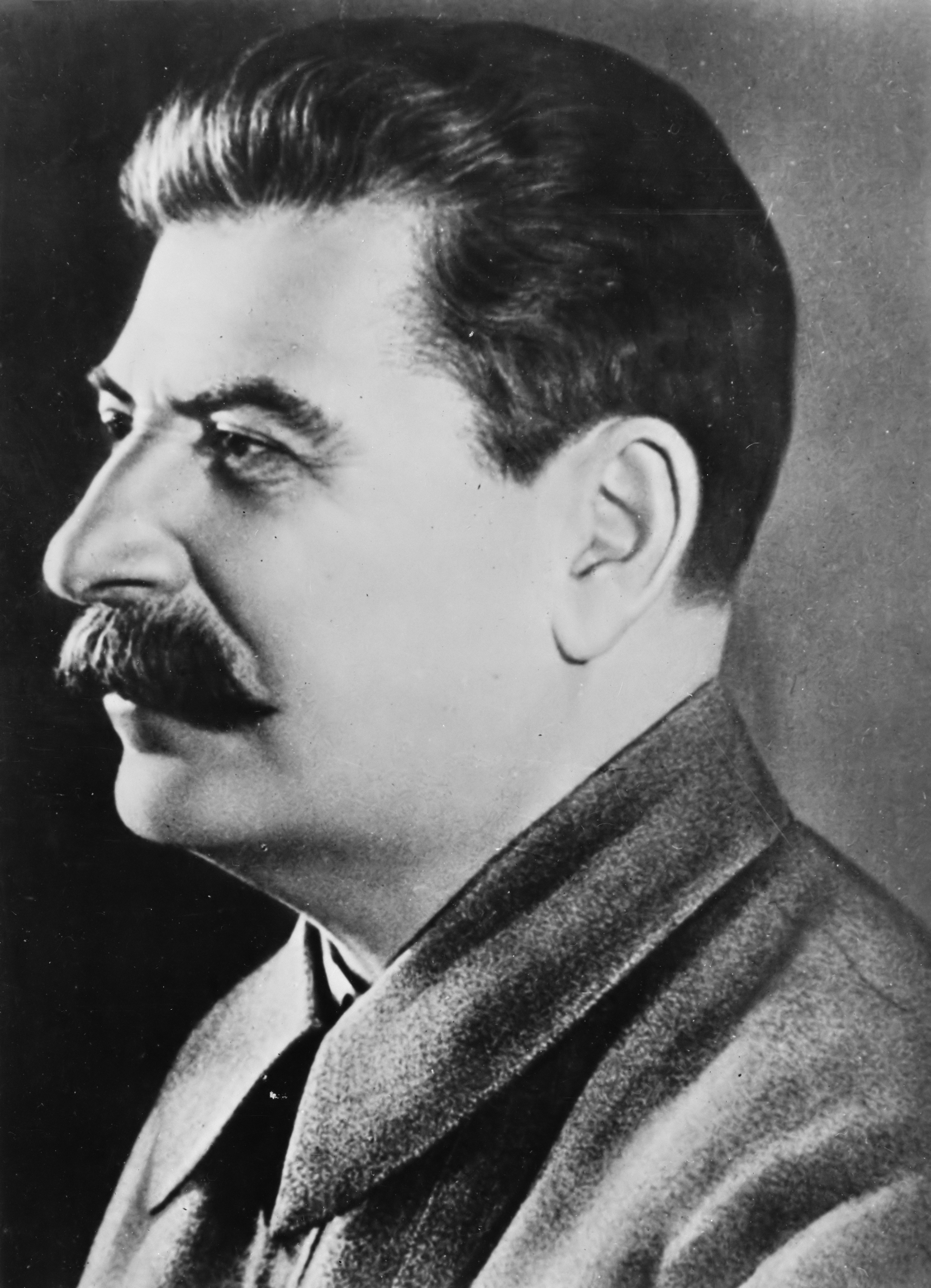
	First party
Leader	Joseph Stalin
Party	VKP(b)
Alliance	BKB
Leader's seat	Kirovsky (Leningrad)
Seats won	763
Seat change	▲13
Popular vote	64,665,587
Percentage	99.76%
Chairman of the Presidium before election
Mikhail Tarasov
Elected Chairman of the Presidium
Mikhail Tarasov
Premier before election
Boris Chernousov
Elected Premier
Boris Chernousov

Supreme Soviet elections were held in the Russian SFSR on 18 February 1951, as part of regional elections across the Soviet Union.

== Background ==
The elections took place amidst a series of purges of figures disliked by the government, including the anti-cosmopolitan campaign, the Soviet War Trophy case, as well as deportations (including the deportation of the Soviet Greeks) and persecution of religions (including Operation North). The Cold War had also begun, including incidents such as the Berlin Blockade, Battle of Korea Strait and the Tito–Stalin split.

== Electoral system ==
The elections were held in accordance with the Regulations on Elections to the Supreme Soviet of the RSFSR, which had been approved by the decree of the Presidium of the Supreme Council of the RSFSR on 11 December 1950.

== Conduct ==
Soviet propaganda actively covered the elections in news publications, emphasising their supposed transparency and fairness and contrasting them with the elections of Western Europe and North America.

Soviet elections began to be a ritual to show loyalty to the government and some voters attended as early as possible to demonstrate their loyalty, with some queueing up early in the night, as the first person to vote was included in the report for the regional committee. The elections were classed as a holiday, with buffets with sandwiches, sweets and scarce goods provided, while there were also concerts, including jazz.

== Results ==
Party	Votes	%	+/–	Seats	+/–
Bloc of Communists and Non-Partisans	64,665,587	99.76	+0.47	763	+13
Against all candidates	155,723	0.24	–0.47	–	–
Total	64,821,310	100.00	–	763	+13
Valid votes	64,821,310	100.00			
Invalid/blank votes	514	0.00			
Total votes	64,821,824	100.00			
Registered voters/turnout	64,832,312	99.98	+0.03		
Source: Moskovskaya Pravda
