= 1955 Russian Supreme Soviet election =

Supreme Election held in the Soviet Union in 1955

- 27 February 1955

All 796 seats in the Supreme Soviet of the Russian SFSR
- Turnout: 99.97%
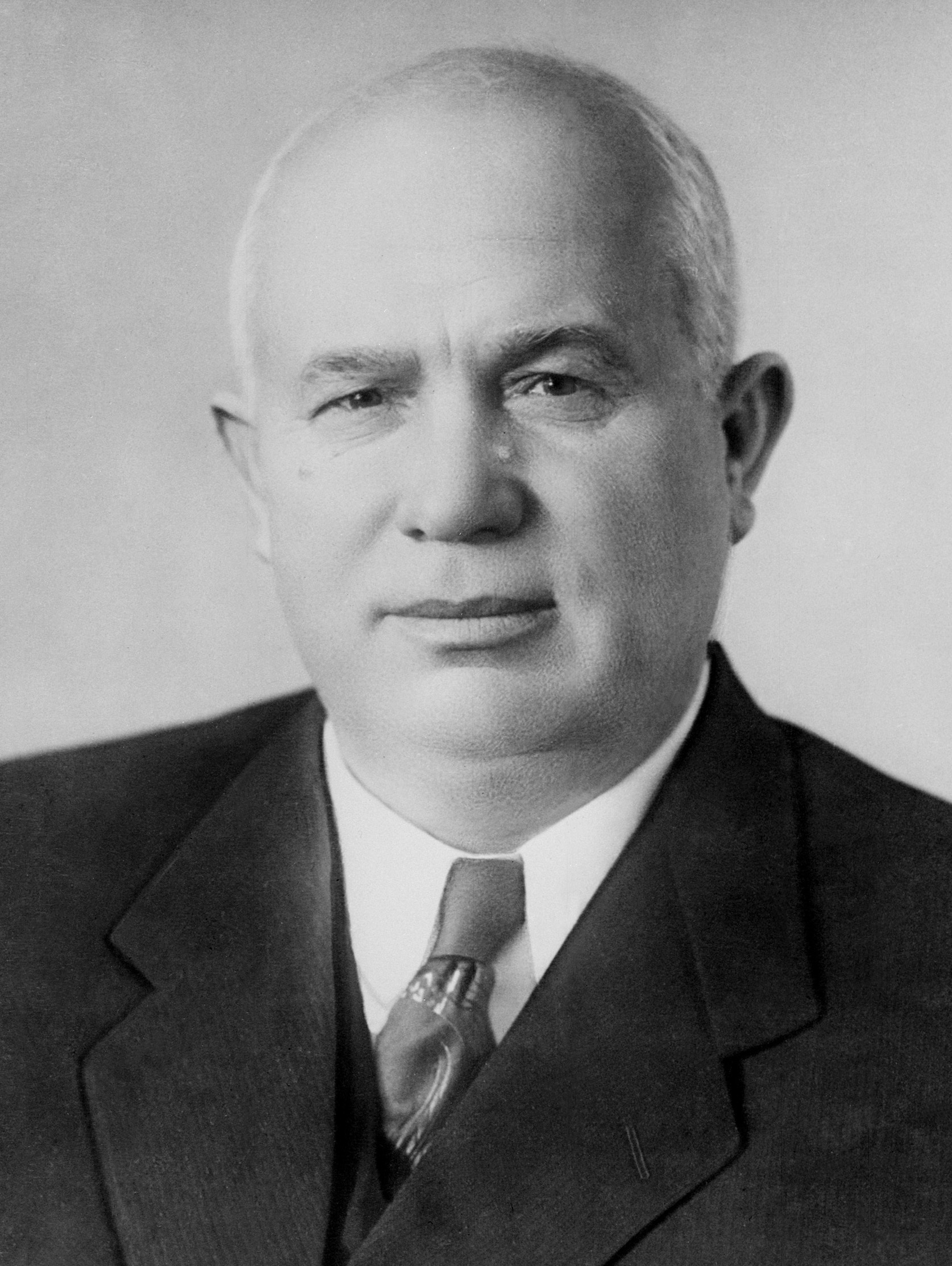
	First party
Leader	Nikita Khrushchev
Party	CPSU
Alliance	BKB
Leader's seat	Kalininsky (Moscow)
Seats won	796
Seat change	▲33
Popular vote	70,374,801
Percentage	99.76%
Chairman of the Presidium before election
Mikhail Tarasov
Elected Chairman of the Presidium
Mikhail Tarasov
Premier before election
Alexander Puzanov
Elected Premier
Alexander Puzanov

Elections to the fourth convocation of the Supreme Soviet of the Russian Soviet Federative Socialist Republic were held on 27 February 1955.

== Background ==
The elections to the Supreme Soviet of the RSFSR were held at the time of the beginning of the Khrushchev Thaw, after the internal power struggle between Khrushchev, Beria and Malenkov ended, but before the famous 20th Congress of the CPSU, which marked the beginning of the de-Stalinization process. At the same time, the Gosplan raised purchase prices for collective farm products, abortion restrictions were lifted and single-sex education was abolished, which could not but have a positive effect on the mood of the population of the RSFSR.

== Conduct ==
The elections were held in accordance with the Regulations on elections to the Supreme Soviet of the RSFSR, approved by the decree of the Presidium of the Supreme Soviet of the RSFSR of December 11, 1950.

Soviet propaganda actively covered the elections in its news outlets, contrasting them with the elections of the countries of Western Europe and North America, putting emphasis on their alleged transparency and fairness.

== Results ==
Party	Votes	%	Seats	+/–
Bloc of Communists and Non-Partisans	70,374,801	99.76	796	+33
Against all candidates	171,847	0.24	–	–
Total	70,546,648	100.00	796	+33
Valid votes	70,546,648	100.00		
Invalid/blank votes	459	0.00		
Total votes	70,547,107	100.00		
Registered voters/turnout	70,568,608	99.97		
Source: Moskovskaya Pravda
