= 1947 Russian Supreme Soviet election =

- 9 February 1947

All 750 seats in the Supreme Soviet of the Russian SFSR
- Turnout: 99.95%
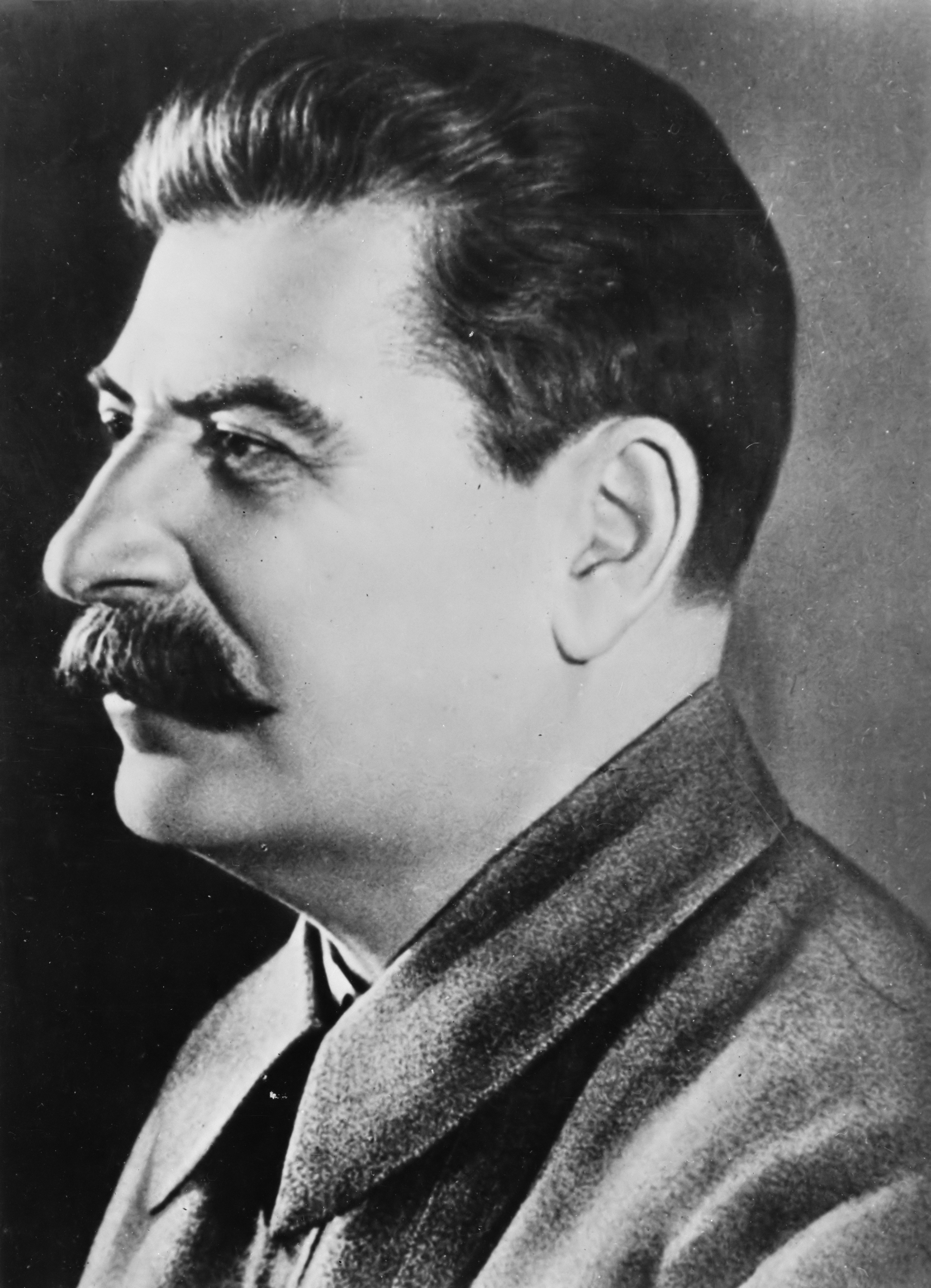
	First party
Leader	Joseph Stalin
Party	VKP(b)
Alliance	BKB
Leader since	3 April 1922
Seats won	750
Percentage	99.29%
Chairman of the Presidium before election
Ivan Vlasov
Elected Chairman of the Presidium
Ivan Vlasov
Premier before election
Mikhail Rodionov
Elected Premier
Mikhail Rodionov

Elections to the Supreme Soviet of the RSFSR were held on 9 February 1947. Held one year after the 1946 Soviet Union legislative election, it was the first republican-level election in the Russian SFSR after World War II. A total of 750 seats were filled by nominees of the Communist Party and non-partisan allies. Each single-member district had only one candidate running unopposed.

== Results ==
Party	Votes	%	+/–	Seats	+/–
Bloc of Communists and Non-Partisans	58,918,779	99.29	–0.17	750	+23
Against all candidates	420,359	0.71	+0.17	–	–
Total	59,339,138	100.00	–	750	+23
Valid votes	59,339,138	100.00			
Invalid/blank votes	2,790	0.00			
Total votes	59,341,928	100.00			
Registered voters/turnout	59,369,181	99.95	+0.67		
Source: Leninskoye Znamya
