= List of heads of government of Russia =

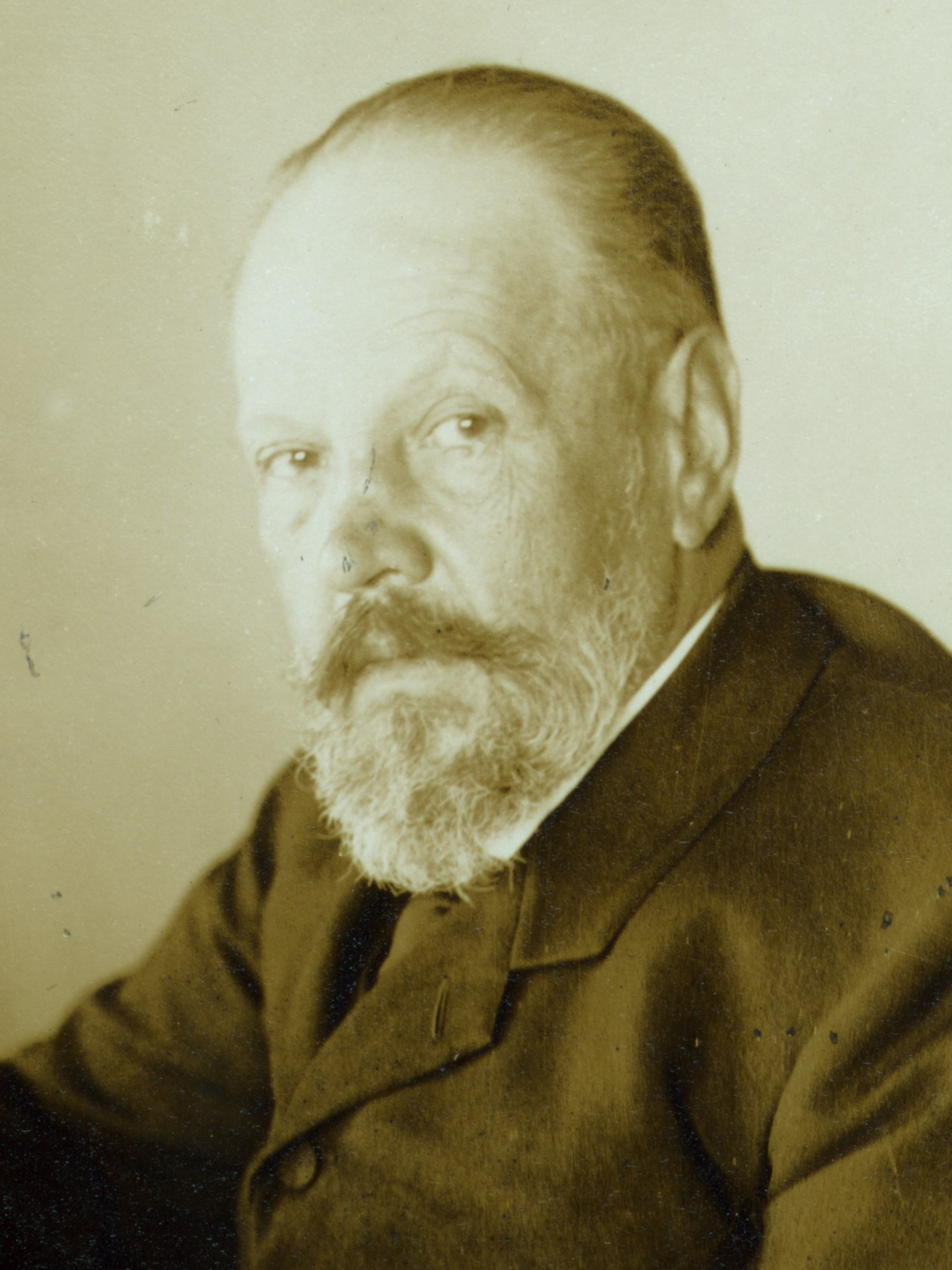
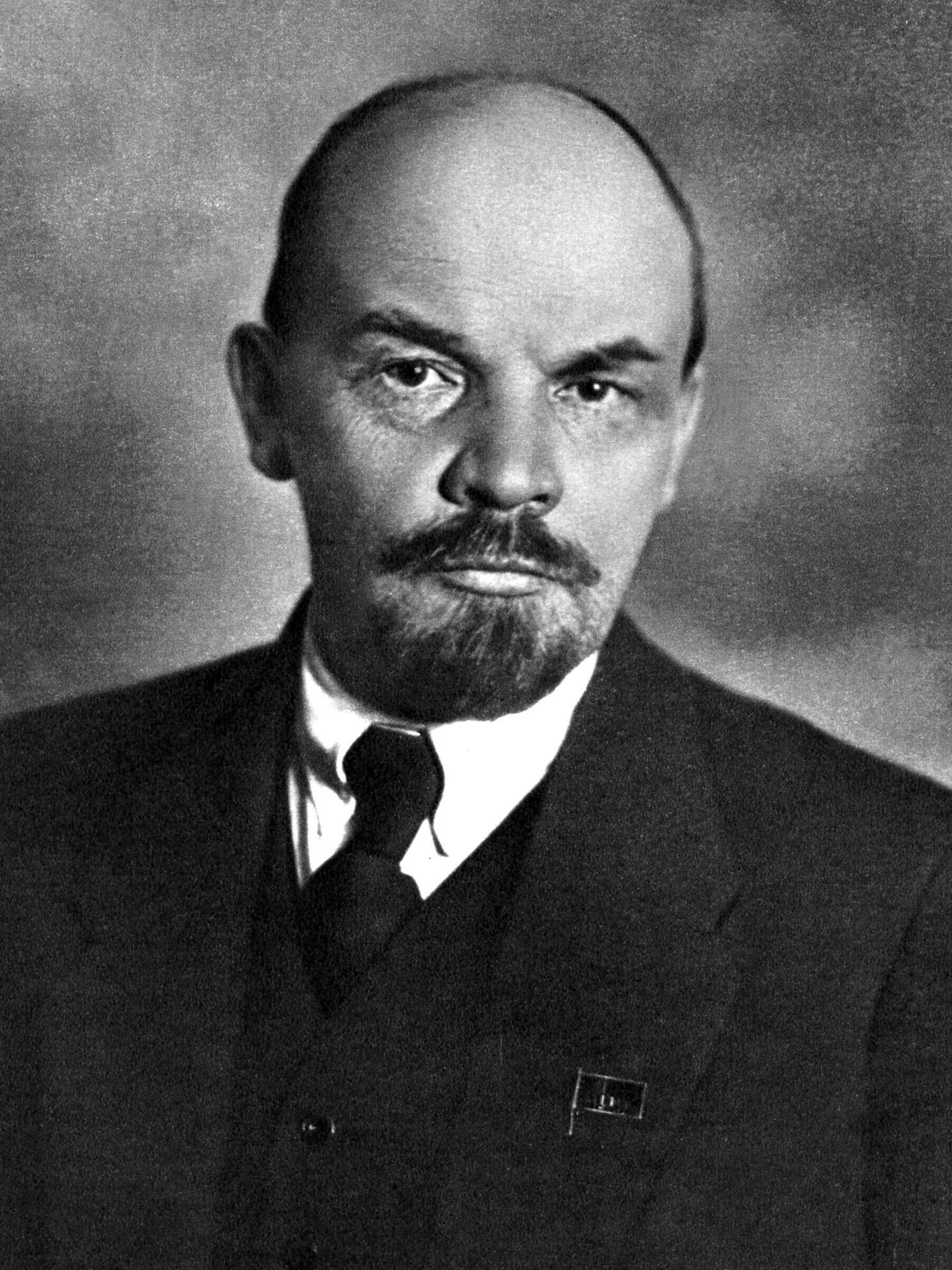
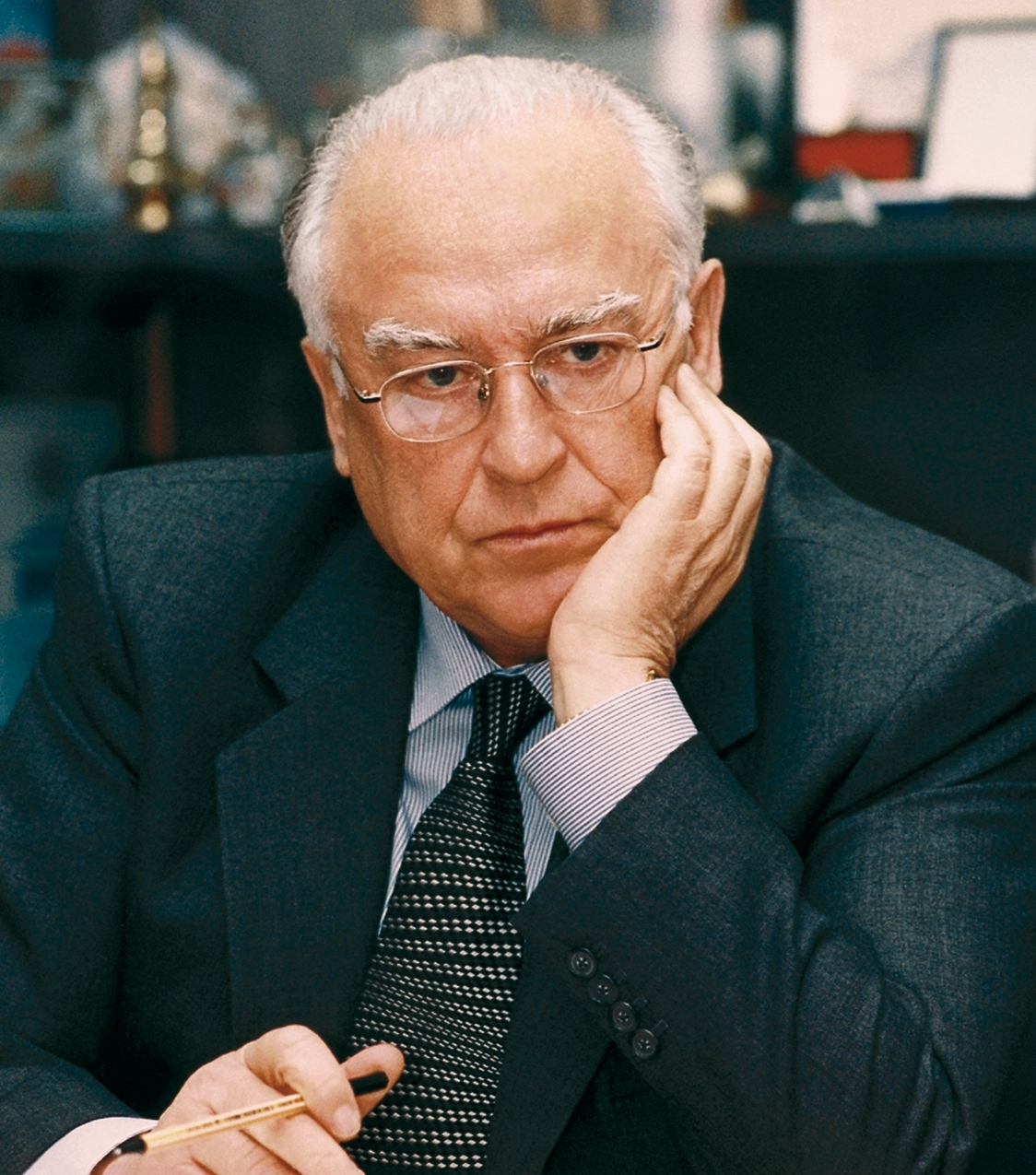
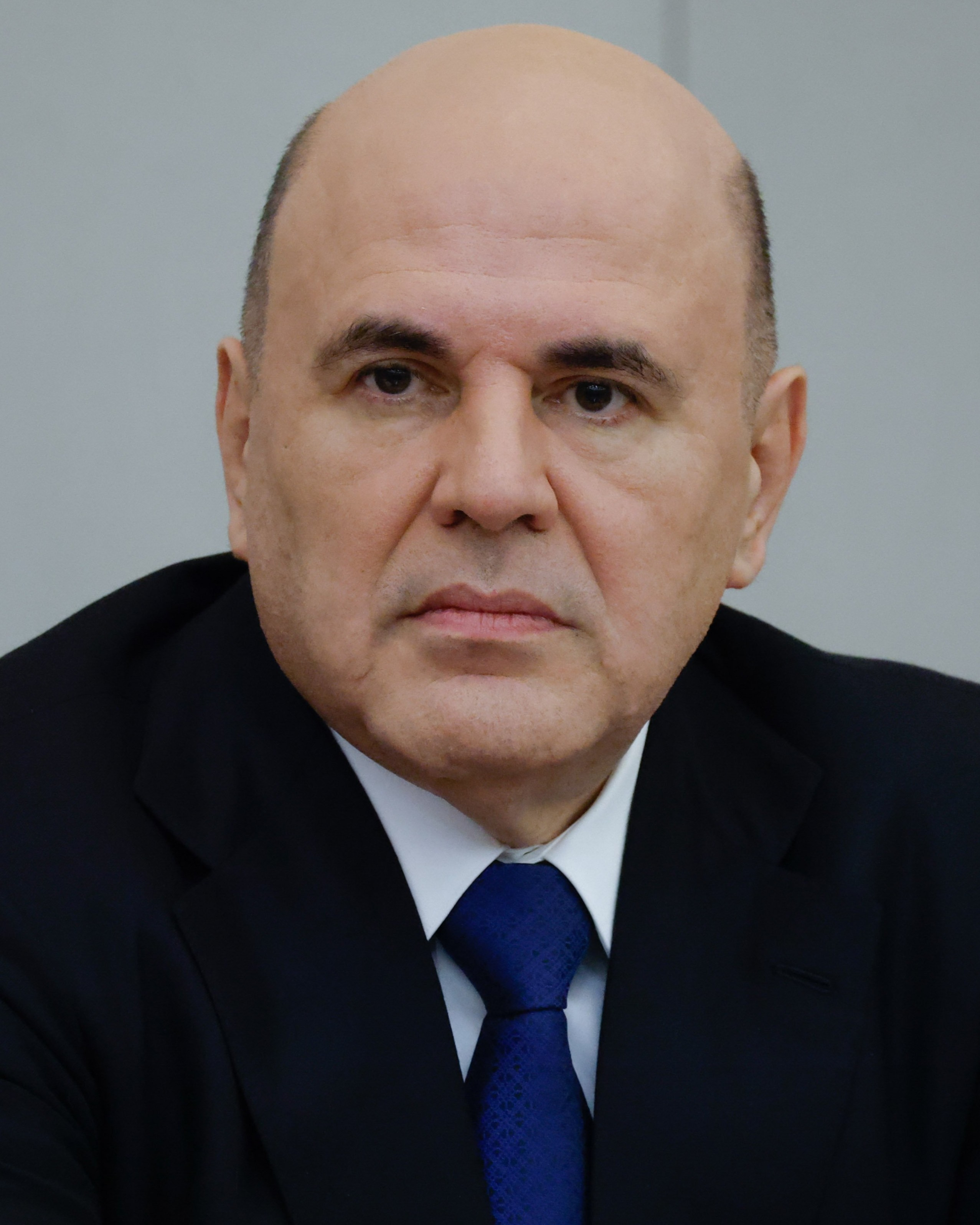
- Top left: In 1905, Sergei Witte became the first prime minister of the Russian Empire.
- Top right: In 1917, Vladimir Lenin became the first prime minister of Soviet Russia and later the Soviet Union (1922).
- Bottom left: In 1992, Viktor Chernomyrdin became the first prime minister of post-soviet Russia.
- Bottom right: Mikhail Mishustin is the current prime minister.

Approximately 38 people have been head of the Russian government since its establishment in 1905.

The Council of Ministers of the Russian Empire, created in November 1905, was preceded by a number of cabinet-like institutions. Oldest of them was the Supreme Privy Council, created in 1726 by the empress Catherine I. Considering weakness of her and her successor's powers, the Council acted as government of the Russian Empire until 1731. Its successor departments such as the Cabinet of Her Imperial Majesty (1731–41), the Conference at the Highest Court (1756–62), the Imperial Council (1762) and finally the Council at the Highest Court (1768–1801) remained mostly advisory bodies to the monarch.

The ministerial reform of 1802 introduced the Committee of Ministers, which competence was limited to interagency issues. The committee was not responsible for the activities of individual ministries and for the coherence of their policies. Beginning with Count Aleksandr Romanovich Vorontsov, the eldest of the officers was de facto chairman of the committee. Eight years after the inauguration of the manifest, the first de jure office holder was Count Nikolay Rumyantsev. According to the tradition established over time, the chairmanship of the committee was the last honorary position, to which elderly respected officials were appointed.

The Council of Ministers was unofficially formed in October 1857, as a result of Emperor Alexander II's reforms; its first session began on 19 (31) December 1857. Before the actual formation of that body on 12 (24) November 1861, the Emperor himself was in charge. The Council of Ministers consisted of chairmen of the State Council and the Committee of Ministers, as well as high-ranking officers appointed by the Emperor. The first session ended on 11 (23) December 1882, after the number of files to the Council greatly decreased.

The imperial Council of Ministers was re-established in late 1905, as a part of the large-scale government reform caused by the First Russian Revolution. All ministries and departments became parts of a single national administration. The Committee of Ministers functioned simultaneously with the second session of the Council of Ministers for six more months; Count Sergei Witte participated on both entities until the abolition of the committee on 23 April (5 May) 1906.

By the order of Emperor Nicholas II, the second session of the Council of Ministers began on 19 October (1 November) 1905, following the formation of the State Duma. Shortly after the February Revolution and the inception of the Russian Provisional Government on 2 (15) March 1917, Georgy Lvov from the Constitutional Democratic Party became Minister-Chairman, who was succeeded by Alexander Kerensky in July.

In November 1917 the Provisional Government was overthrown by the Bolshevik faction of Russian social democrats led by Vladimir Lenin. The Council of People's Commissars of the Russian Soviet Republic became the new governmental body, which was chaired from 1917 to 1924 by Lenin. That body was renamed Council of Ministers following a decree of the Supreme Council on 23 March 1946. The same was made in other republics of the Soviet Union.

After the fall of the Soviet Union, Boris Yeltsin, as the President of the Russian Federation, was appointed as the extraordinary head of government of the Russian Federation. The latter body took the name "Council of Ministers — Government of Russia", the chairman of which became Viktor Chernomyrdin, replacing acting chairman Yegor Gaidar. According to the new constitution ratified on 25 December 1993, the "Government" (Russian: Правительство, romanized: Pravitelstvo) is the official name of the Russian cabinet. Since then, the head of that office takes the formal title "Chairmen of the Government" or colloquially "Prime Minister."

Current Prime Minister Mikhail Mishustin took the office on 16 January 2020.

The youngest head of government by his accession to office was Sergey Kiriyenko (1998), at age 35, and the oldest Ivan Goremykin (1914), at age 74.

== Russian Empire (1721–1917) ==
=== Early collegial institutions without a single leader ===
Since the 18th century, a modern system of public administration was going to be created in Russia, including the formation of bodies such as the Supreme Privy Council and the Committee of Ministers whose powers are similar to the powers of the modern Russian Government. In the period from 1726 to 1905 there was no official title for the leader of the government. The chief ministers (principal ministres) of certain Emperor of Russia nonetheless led the government de facto, but de jure the head of government was a monarch.

Portrait	Name (birth–death)	Term of office		Monarch
Members of the Supreme Privy Council of the Russian Empire (1726–1730)
	Count and Prince Alexander Danilovich Menshikov (1673–1729)	8 February 1726	8 September 1727	Catherine I (1725–1727) Peter II (1727–1730) Anna (1730–1740)
	Count Fyodor Matveyevich Apraksin (1661–1728)	8 February 1726	10 November 1728	Catherine I (1725–1727) Peter II (1727–1730) Anna (1730–1740)
	Count Gavriil Ivanovich Golovkin (1660–1734)	8 February 1726	6 May 1727	Catherine I (1725–1727) Peter II (1727–1730) Anna (1730–1740)
	Count Andrey Ivanovich Osterman (1686–1747)	8 February 1726	6 May 1727	Catherine I (1725–1727) Peter II (1727–1730) Anna (1730–1740)
	Prince Dmitry Mikhaylovich Golitsyn (1665–1737)	8 February 1726	6 May 1727	Catherine I (1725–1727) Peter II (1727–1730) Anna (1730–1740)
	Count Pyotr Andreyevich Tolstoy (1645–1729)	8 February 1726	6 May 1727	Catherine I (1725–1727) Peter II (1727–1730) Anna (1730–1740)
	Count Karl-Fridrikh Golshteyn-Gottorpsky (1700–1739)	8 February 1726 (or March 1726)	25 July 1727	Catherine I (1725–1727) Peter II (1727–1730) Anna (1730–1740)
	Prince Alexey Grigoryevich Dolgorukov (?–1734)	3 February 1728	4 March 1730	Catherine I (1725–1727) Peter II (1727–1730) Anna (1730–1740)
	Prince Vasily Lukich Dolgorukov (1670–1739)	6 April 1729	4 March 1730	Catherine I (1725–1727) Peter II (1727–1730) Anna (1730–1740)
	Prince Vasily Vladimirovich Dolgorukov (1667–1746)	19 January 1730	4 March 1730	Catherine I (1725–1727) Peter II (1727–1730) Anna (1730–1740)
	Prince Mikhail Mikhailovich Golitsyn (1675–1730)	19 January 1730	4 March 1730	Catherine I (1725–1727) Peter II (1727–1730) Anna (1730–1740)
Cabinet ministers of the Russian Empire (1731–1741)
	Count Gavriil Ivanovich Golovkin (1660–1734)	10 November 1731	20 January 1734	Anna (1730–1740)
	Count Andrey Ivanovich Osterman (1686–1747)	20 January 1734	10 November 1740	Anna (1730–1740)
	Count Khristofor Antonovich Minikh (1683–1767)	10 November 1740	3 March 1741	Ivan VI (1740–1741)
	Count Andrey Ivanovich Osterman (1686–1747) (2nd time)	3 March 1741	25 November 1741	Ivan VI (1740–1741)
Conferency ministers at the Highest Court of the Russian Empire (1756–1762)
	Stepan Fyodorovich Apraksin (1702–1758)	14 March 1756	1 October 1757	Elizabeth (1741–1762) Peter III (1762)
	Count Mikhail Petrovich Bestuzhev-Ryumin (1688–1760)	14 March 1756	2 October 1757	Elizabeth (1741–1762) Peter III (1762)
	Prince Mikhail Mikhaylovich Golitsyn (1684–1764)	14 March 1756	17 December 1757	Elizabeth (1741–1762) Peter III (1762)
	Count Alexey Petrovich Bestuzhev-Ryumin (1693–1768)	14 March 1756	14 February 1758	Elizabeth (1741–1762) Peter III (1762)
	Count Alexander Borisovich Buturlin (1694–1767)	14 March 1756	17 October 1760	Elizabeth (1741–1762) Peter III (1762)
	Count Peter Ivanovich Shuvalov (1711–1762)	14 March 1756	4 January 1762	Elizabeth (1741–1762) Peter III (1762)
	Count Mikhail Illarionovich Vorontsov (1714–1767)	14 March 1756	20 January 1762	Elizabeth (1741–1762) Peter III (1762)
	Prince Nikita Yuryevich Trubetskoy (1699–1767)	14 March 1756	20 January 1762	Elizabeth (1741–1762) Peter III (1762)
	Count Alexander Ivanovich Shuvalov (1710–1771)	14 March 1756	20 January 1762	Elizabeth (1741–1762) Peter III (1762)
	Grand Duke Peter Fyodorovich Romanov (subsequently Emperor Peter III) (1728–1762)	14 March 1756	28 January 1762	Elizabeth (1741–1762) Peter III (1762)
	Prince Yakov Petrovich Shakhovskoy (1705–1777)	16 September 1760	25 December 1761	Elizabeth (1741–1762) Peter III (1762)
	Ivan Ivanovich Neplyuev (1693–1773)	16 September 1760	20 January 1762	Elizabeth (1741–1762) Peter III (1762)
	Count Roman Illarionovich Vorontsov (1707–1783)	28 December 1761	20 January 1762	Elizabeth (1741–1762) Peter III (1762)
Members of the Imperial Council of the Russian Empire (1762)
	Prince Georg-Ludwig Golshteyn-Gottorpsky (1719–1763)	28 January 1762	28 June 1762	Peter III (1762)
	Count Pyotr August Friedrich Golshteyn-Beksky (1696–1775)	28 January 1762	28 June 1762	Peter III (1762)
	Count Khristofor Antonovich Minikh (1683–1767)	28 January 1762	28 June 1762	Peter III (1762)
	Prince Nikita Yuryevich Trubetskoy (1699–1767)	28 January 1762	28 June 1762	Peter III (1762)
	Count Mikhail Illarionovich Vorontsov (1714–1767)	28 January 1762	28 June 1762	Peter III (1762)
	Aleksandr Nikitich Vilboa (1713–1788)	28 January 1762	28 June 1762	Peter III (1762)
	Prince Mikhail Nikitich Volkonsky (1713–1788)	28 January 1762	28 June 1762	Peter III (1762)
	Aleksey Petrovich Melgunov (1722–1788)	28 January 1762	28 June 1762	Peter III (1762)
Heads of Council Affairs at the Highest Court (Highest Council) of the Russian Empire (1768–1801)
	Stepan Fyodorovich Strekalov (1728–1805)	17 November 1768	1776	Catherine II (1762–1796)
	Count Alexander Nikolayevich Samoylov (1744–1814)	1776	1787	Catherine II (1762–1796)
	Ivan Andreyevich Weydemeyer (1752–1820)	1787	18 November 1796	Catherine II (1762–1796)
	Gavriil Romanovich Derzhavin (1743–1816)	18 November 1796	22 November 1796	Paul I (1796–1801)
	Ivan Andreyevich Weydemeyer (1752–1820) (2nd time)	18 November 1796	26 March 1801	Paul I (1796–1801)

=== Committee of Ministers (1802–1905) ===
The Committee of Ministers was established on 20 September 1802 in the course of Alexander I's ministerial reform. All the ministers were independent from each other and were responsible for the activities of their departments individually. The committee was not responsible either for the activities of individual ministries, or for the coherence of their policies. During the first years of the existence of the committee, its meetings were chaired by the Emperor, and in his absence - by the ministers alternately, starting with the senior in rank, each for 4 sessions. In 1810, the chairmanship was given to the chancellor and chairman of the State Council Count N.P. Rumyantsev.

Portrait	Name (birth–death)	Term of office		Monarch
Chairmen of the Committee of Ministers of the Russian Empire (1802–1905)
	Count Nikolay Petrovich Rumyantsev (1754–1826)	1810	1812	Alexander I (1801–1825)
	Count and Prince Nikolay Ivanovich Saltykov (1736–1816)	29 March 1812	9 September 1812 (disputed) (Note: Sources which list Vyazmitinov as Saltykov's successor state a date of 9 September 1812; other sources assert that Saltykov was in office until his death); 16 May 1816	Alexander I (1801–1825)
	Count Sergey Kuzmich Vyazmitinov (disputed) (Note: Some sources (such as the Great Soviet Encyclopedia) list Vyazmitinov as committee minister, while other (such as the History of the Fatherland encyclopedia) don't mention him at all and instead list Lopukhin as the successor of Saltykov.) (1744–1819)	9 September 1812	15 October 1816	Alexander I (1801–1825)
	Prince Pyotr Vasilyevich Lopukhin (1753–1827)	25 May 1816	6 April 1827	Alexander I (1801–1825)
	Prince Viktor Pavlovich Kochubey (1768–1834)	29 April 1827	3 June 1834	Nicholas I (1825–1855)
	Count Nikolay Nikolayevich Novosiltsev (1761–1838)	11 July 1834	8 April 1838	Nicholas I (1825–1855)
	Prince Illarion Vasilyevich Vasilchikov (1776–1847)	9 April 1838	21 February 1847	Nicholas I (1825–1855)
	Count Vasily Vasilyevich Levashov (1783–1848)	31 December 1847	23 September 1848	Nicholas I (1825–1855)
	Prince Alexander Ivanovich Chernyshyov (1785–1857)	1 December 1848	5 April 1856	Nicholas I (1825–1855)
	Prince Alexey Fyodorovich Orlov (1787–1862)	May; 1857	January; 1861	Alexander II (1855–1881)
	Count Dmitry Nikolayevich Bludov (1785–1864)	12 November 1861	19 February 1864	Alexander II (1855–1881)
	Prince Pavel Pavlovich Gagarin (1789–1872)	24 February 1864	21 February 1872	Alexander II (1855–1881)
	Count Pavel Nikolayevich Ignatyev (1797–1879)	21 February 1872	20 December 1879	Alexander II (1855–1881)
	Count Pyotr Aleksandrovich Valuyev (1815–1890)	25 December 1879	4 October 1881	Alexander II (1855–1881)
	Count Mikhail Khristoforovich Reytern (1820–1890)	4 October 1881	30 December 1886	Alexander III (1881–1894)
	Nikolay Khristianovich Bunge (1823–1895)	1 January 1887	3 June 1895	Alexander III (1881–1894)
	Ivan Nikolayevich Durnovo (1834–1903)	15 October 1895	29 May 1903	Nicholas II (1894–1917)
	Count Sergei Yulyevich Witte (1849–1915)	16 August 1903	6 November 1905	Nicholas II (1894–1917)

=== Prime Minister of the Russian Empire (1905–1917) ===
The modern government type in Russia came after the establishment of the Council of Ministers on 1 November 1905, created for the "management and union action principal chiefs of departments on subjects like law and senior public administration", and modelled on the relevant institutions within the constitutional states, when all the ministries and directorates have been declared part of the unified state management. The first Prime Minister was Count Sergei Witte, who was appointed on 6 November 1905.

Independent
Russian Assembly

Portrait	Name (birth–death)	Term of office			Political party	Monarch
1	Count Sergei Yulyevich Witte (1849–1915)	•	6 November 1905	5 May 1906	Independent	Nicholas II (1894–1917)
2	Ivan Logginovich Goremykin (1839–1917)	1	5 May 1906	21 July 1906	Independent	Nicholas II (1894–1917)
3	Pyotr Arkadyevich Stolypin (1862–1911)	•	21 July 1906	18 September 1911 (Assassinated)	Independent	Nicholas II (1894–1917)
4	Count Vladimir Nikolayevich Kokovtsov (1853–1943)	•	22 September 1911	12 February 1914	Independent	Nicholas II (1894–1917)
(2)	Ivan Logginovich Goremykin (1839–1917)	2	12 February 1914	2 February 1916	Independent	Nicholas II (1894–1917)
5	Baron Boris Vladimirovich Shtyurmer (1848–1917)	•	2 February 1916	23 November 1916	Russian Assembly	Nicholas II (1894–1917)
6	Alexander Fyodorovich Trepov (1862–1928)	•	23 November 1916	9 January 1917	Russian Assembly	Nicholas II (1894–1917)
7	Prince Nikolai Dmitriyevich Golitsyn (1850–1925)	•	9 January 1917	12 March 1917	Independent	Nicholas II (1894–1917)

== Provisional Government/Russian Republic (1917) ==
After the abdication of Nicholas II from the throne in favor of his brother Michael, Michael also abdicated, before the convening of the Constituent Assembly. On 14 September 1917, the Russian Republic was proclaimed. At this period, a provisional government was formed and the Prime Minister was the head of state.

Constitutional Democratic Party
Socialist Revolutionary Party

Portrait	Name (birth–death)	Term of office			Political party
8	Prince Georgy Yevgenyevich Lvov (1861–1925)	1	15 March 1917	18 May 1917	Constitutional Democratic Party
8	Prince Georgy Yevgenyevich Lvov (1861–1925)	2	18 May 1917	21 July 1917	Constitutional Democratic Party
9	Alexander Fyodorovich Kerensky (1881–1970)	2	21 July 1917	6 August 1917	Socialist Revolutionary Party
9	Alexander Fyodorovich Kerensky (1881–1970)	1	6 August 1917	14 September 1917	Socialist Revolutionary Party
9	Alexander Fyodorovich Kerensky (1881–1970)	2	14 September 1917	8 October 1917	Socialist Revolutionary Party
9	Alexander Fyodorovich Kerensky (1881–1970)	3	8 October 1917	7 November 1917	Socialist Revolutionary Party

== Governments of the Whites (1918–1920) ==
The heads of Russian governments formed by representatives of the White movement during the Civil War. In fact, the white movement formed two parallel governments at that moment - the Russian State and the governments of the Armed Forces of South Russia, which controlled the separated parts of the country.

=== Russian State ===
Socialist Revolutionary Party
Independent

Portrait	Name (birth–death)	Term of office			Political party	Head of state
	Pyotr Vasilyevich Vologodsky (1863–1925)	•	4 November 1918	18 November 1918	Socialist Revolutionary Party	Nikolai Avksentiev (1918)
	Pyotr Vasilyevich Vologodsky (1863–1925)	•	18 November 1918	22 November 1919	Socialist Revolutionary Party	Alexander Kolchak (1918–1920)
	Viktor Nikolayevich Pepelyayev (1885–1920)	•	22 November 1919	4 January 1920	Independent	Alexander Kolchak (1918–1920)

=== South Russia ===
Heads of military government structures formed by the command of the Armed Forces of the South of Russia.

Military
Independent

Portrait	Name (birth–death)	Term of office			Political party	Head of state
	Abram Mikhailovich Dragomirov (1868–1955)	•	October 1918	September 1919	Military	Anton Denikin (1918–1920)
	Alexander Sergeyevich Lukomsky (1868–1939)	•	September 1919	30 December 1919	Military	Anton Denikin (1918–1920)
	Alexander Sergeyevich Lukomsky (1868–1939)	•	30 December 1919	March 1920	Military	Anton Denikin (1918–1920)
	Nikolay Mikhailovich Melnikov (1882–1972)	•	March 1920	30 March 1920	Independent	Anton Denikin (1918–1920)
	Alexander Vasilyevich Krivoshein (1857–1921)	•	19 August 1920	11 November 1920	Independent	Pyotr Wrangel (1920)

== Russian Soviet Federative Socialist Republic (1917–1991) ==
Since the creation of the Russian Soviet Republic its cabinet was styled as the Council of People's Commissars. Between the creation of the USSR on 30 December 1922 and the formation of its own Council of People's Commissars on 6 July 1923, the Council of People's Commissars of Russia temporarily acted as the government of the USSR. On 23 March 1946, the Council of People's Commissars was renamed into the Council of Ministers of the RSFSR.

Communist Party
Independent

Portrait	Name (birth–death)	Term of office			Political party	Legislature (election)	Head of state
10	Vladimir Ilyich Ulyanov (Lenin) (1870–1924)	•	8 November 1917	21 January 1924 (Died in office)	Communist Party	ARCEC	Lev Kamenev (1917)
10	Vladimir Ilyich Ulyanov (Lenin) (1870–1924)	•	8 November 1917	21 January 1924 (Died in office)	Communist Party	ARCEC	Yakov Sverdlov (1917–1919)
10	Vladimir Ilyich Ulyanov (Lenin) (1870–1924)	•	8 November 1917	21 January 1924 (Died in office)	Communist Party	ARCEC	Mikhail Kalinin (1919–1938)
11	Alexey Ivanovich Rykov (1881–1938)	•	2 February 1924	18 May 1929	Communist Party	ARCEC	Mikhail Kalinin (1919–1938)
12	Sergey Ivanovich Syrtsov (1893–1937)	•	18 May 1929	3 November 1930	Communist Party	ARCEC	Mikhail Kalinin (1919–1938)
13	Daniil Yegorovich Sulimov (1890–1937)	•	3 November 1930	22 July 1937	Communist Party	ARCEC	Mikhail Kalinin (1919–1938)
14	Nikolay Alexandrovich Bulganin (1895–1975)	1	22 July 1937	19 July 1938	Communist Party	ARCEC	Mikhail Kalinin (1919–1938)
14	Nikolay Alexandrovich Bulganin (1895–1975)	2	20 July 1938	17 September 1938	Communist Party	I (1938)	Alexei Badayev (1938–1944)
15	Vasily Vasilyevich Vakhrushev (1902–1947)	•	29 July 1939	2 June 1940	Communist Party	I (1938)	Alexei Badayev (1938–1944)
16	Ivan Sergeyevich Khokhlov (1895–1973)	•	2 June 1940	23 June 1943 (Note: Deputy premier Konstantin Pamfilov effectively exercised Khokhlov's duties since 5 May 1942 until his death on 2 May 1943.)	Communist Party	I (1938)	Alexei Badayev (1938–1944)
17	Alexey Nikolayevich Kosygin (1904–1980)	•	23 June 1943	23 March 1946	Communist Party	I (1938)	Nikolay Shvernik (1944–1946)
18	Mikhail Ivanovich Rodionov (1907–1950)	1	23 March 1946	25 June 1947	Communist Party	I (1938)	Nikolay Shvernik (1944–1946)
18	Mikhail Ivanovich Rodionov (1907–1950)	2	26 June 1947	9 March 1949	Communist Party	II (1947)	Ivan Vlasov (1946–1950)
19	Boris Nikolayevich Chernousov (1908–1978)	1	9 March 1949	17 April 1951	Communist Party	II (1947)	Ivan Vlasov (1946–1950)
19	Boris Nikolayevich Chernousov (1908–1978)	2	17 April 1951	20 October 1952	Communist Party	III (1951)	Mikhail Tarasov (1950–1959)
20	Alexander Mikhailovich Puzanov (1906–1998)	1	20 October 1952	26 March 1955	Communist Party	III (1951)	Mikhail Tarasov (1950–1959)
20	Alexander Mikhailovich Puzanov (1906–1998)	2	26 March 1955	24 January 1956	Communist Party	IV (1955)	Mikhail Tarasov (1950–1959)
21	Mikhail Alexeyevich Yasnov (1906–1991)	•	24 January 1956	19 December 1957	Communist Party	IV (1955)	Mikhail Tarasov (1950–1959)
22	Frol Romanovich Kozlov (1908–1965)	•	19 December 1957	31 March 1958	Communist Party	IV (1955)	Mikhail Tarasov (1950–1959)
23	Dmitry Stepanovich Polyansky (1917–2001)	1	31 March 1958	15 April 1959	Communist Party	IV (1955)	Mikhail Tarasov (1950–1959)
23	Dmitry Stepanovich Polyansky (1917–2001)	2	16 April 1959	23 November 1962	Communist Party	V (1959)	Nikolay Ignatov (1959)
23	Dmitry Stepanovich Polyansky (1917–2001)	2	16 April 1959	23 November 1962	Communist Party	V (1959)	Nikolay Organov (1959–1962)
24	Gennady Ivanovich Voronov (1910–1994)	1	23 November 1962	5 April 1963	Communist Party	V (1959)	Nikolay Ignatov (1962–1966)
24	Gennady Ivanovich Voronov (1910–1994)	2	5 April 1963	12 April 1967	Communist Party	VI (1963)	Nikolay Ignatov (1962–1966)
24	Gennady Ivanovich Voronov (1910–1994)	3	12 April 1967	23 July 1971	Communist Party	VII (1967)	Mikhail Yasnov (1966–1985)
25	Mikhail Sergeyevich Solomentsev (1913–2008)	1	28 July 1971	15 July 1975	Communist Party	VIII (1971)	Mikhail Yasnov (1966–1985)
25	Mikhail Sergeyevich Solomentsev (1913–2008)	2	15 July 1975	26 March 1980	Communist Party	IX (1975)	Mikhail Yasnov (1966–1985)
25	Mikhail Sergeyevich Solomentsev (1913–2008)	3	26 March 1980	24 June 1983	Communist Party	X (1980)	Mikhail Yasnov (1966–1985)
26	Vitaly Ivanovich Vorotnikov (1926–2012)	1	24 June 1983	26 March 1985	Communist Party	X (1980)	Mikhail Yasnov (1966–1985)
26	Vitaly Ivanovich Vorotnikov (1926–2012)	2	26 March 1985	3 October 1988	Communist Party	XI (1985)	Vladimir Orlov (1985–1988)
27	Alexander Vladimirovich Vlasov (1932–2002)	•	3 October 1988	15 June 1990	Communist Party	XI (1985)	Vitaly Vorotnikov (1988–1990)
27	Alexander Vladimirovich Vlasov (1932–2002)	•	3 October 1988	15 June 1990	Communist Party	XI (1985)	Boris Yeltsin (1990–1991)
28	Ivan Stepanovich Silayev (1930–2023)	1	15 June 1990	10 July 1991 (Note: The Council of Ministers of the RSFSR resigned before the elected President of the RSFSR, who took office on July 10, 1991)	Communist Party	XII (1990)	Boris Yeltsin (1990–1991)
28	Ivan Stepanovich Silayev (1930–2023)	2	12 July 1991	26 September 1991	Communist Party	XII (1990)	Boris Yeltsin (1990–1991)
P	Boris Nikolayevich Yeltsin (Note: Headed the government as President of Russia, was not the Prime Minister.) (1931–2007)	•	6 November 1991	25 December 1991	Independent	XII (1990)	Boris Yeltsin (1990–1991)

== Russian Federation (1991–present) ==
Independent
Our Home – Russia
United Russia

Portrait	Name (birth–death)	Term of office			Political party	President
P	Boris Nikolayevich Yeltsin (1931–2007)	•	25 December 1991	15 June 1992	Independent	Boris Yeltsin (1991–1999)
29	Viktor Stepanovich Chernomyrdin (1938–2010)	1	14 December 1992	9 August 1996	Our Home – Russia	Boris Yeltsin (1991–1999)
29	Viktor Stepanovich Chernomyrdin (1938–2010)	2	10 August 1996	23 March 1998	Our Home – Russia	Boris Yeltsin (1991–1999)
30	Sergey Vladilenovich Kiriyenko (born 1962)	•	24 April 1998	23 August 1998	Independent	Boris Yeltsin (1991–1999)
31	Yevgeny Maksimovich Primakov (1929–2015)	•	11 September 1998	12 May 1999	Independent	Boris Yeltsin (1991–1999)
32	Sergey Vadimovich Stepashin (born 1952)	•	19 May 1999	9 August 1999	Independent	Boris Yeltsin (1991–1999)
33	Vladimir Vladimirovich Putin (born 1952)	1	16 August 1999	7 May 2000	Independent	Boris Yeltsin (1991–1999)
34	Mikhail Mikhailovich Kasyanov (born 1957)	•	17 May 2000	24 February 2004	Independent	Vladimir Putin (2000–2008) (Note: Putin de facto took this position on 31 December 1999, when he became Acting President after the resignation of Boris Yeltsin. Elected President on 26 March 2000, officially took office on 7 May 2000.)
35	Mikhail Yefimovich Fradkov (born 1950)	1	5 March 2004	7 May 2004	United Russia	Vladimir Putin (2000–2008)
35	Mikhail Yefimovich Fradkov (born 1950)	2	12 May 2004	12 September 2007	United Russia	Vladimir Putin (2000–2008)
36	Viktor Alekseyevich Zubkov (born 1941)	•	14 September 2007	7 May 2008	United Russia	Vladimir Putin (2000–2008)
(33)	Vladimir Vladimirovich Putin (born 1952)	2	8 May 2008	7 May 2012	United Russia	Dmitry Medvedev (2008–2012)
37	Dmitry Anatolyevich Medvedev (born 1965)	1	8 May 2012	7 May 2018	United Russia	Vladimir Putin (2012–)
37	Dmitry Anatolyevich Medvedev (born 1965)	2	8 May 2018	15 January 2020	United Russia	Vladimir Putin (2012–)
38	Mikhail Vladimirovich Mishustin (born 1966)	1	16 January 2020	7 May 2024	Independent	Vladimir Putin (2012–)
38	Mikhail Vladimirovich Mishustin (born 1966)	2	10 May 2024	Incumbent	Independent	Vladimir Putin (2012–)

== Acting prime ministers ==
- Vladimir Kokovtsov: 18–22 September 1911
- Vasily Vakhrushev: 17 September 1938 – 29 July 1939
- Konstantin Pamfilov: 5 May 1942 – 2 May 1943
- Ivan Silayev: 10–12 July 1991
- Oleg Lobov: 26 September – 6 November 1991
- Yegor Gaidar: 15 June – 14 December 1992
- Sergey Kiriyenko: 23 March – 24 April 1998
- Viktor Chernomyrdin: 9–10 August 1996 and 23 August – 11 September 1998
- Sergey Stepashin: 12–19 May 1999
- Vladimir Putin: 9–16 August 1999
- Mikhail Kasyanov: 7–17 May 2000
- Viktor Khristenko: 24 February – 5 March 2004
- Mikhail Fradkov: 7–12 May 2004 and 12–14 September 2007
- Viktor Zubkov: 7–8 May 2008 and 7–8 May 2012
- Dmitry Medvedev: 7–8 May 2018 and 15–16 January 2020
- Andrey Belousov: 30 April – 19 May 2020
- Mikhail Mishustin: 7–10 May 2024

== See also ==
- Prime Minister of Russia
- Politics of Russia
- Government of Russia
- Premier of the Soviet Union
- Bald–hairy
