= 1938 Russian Supreme Soviet election =

- 26 June 1938

All 727 seats in the Supreme Soviet

| | First party | Second party |
|---|---|---|
| Leader | Joseph Stalin |
| Party | VKP(b) | Independents |
| Alliance | BKB | BKB |
| Seats won | 568 | 159 |
Chairman of the ARCEC before election
Mikhail Kalinin
Chairman of the Presidium after election
Aleksei Badayev
Premier before election
Nikolay Bulganin
Elected Premier
Nikolay Bulganin

Legislative elections were held in the Russian Soviet Federative Socialist Republic on 26 June 1938, the first after the establishment of the Soviet Union.

== Background ==
The constitution of the USSR was adopted on 5 December 1936, in accordance with which elections were held for new bodies at all levels from local councils and ending with the Supreme Council of the Soviet Union.

== Results ==
| Party or alliance | | Votes | % | Seats |
|---|---|---|---|---|
| Bloc of Communists and Non-Partisans | All-Union Communist Party (Bolsheviks) | 59,542,993 | 99.46 | 568 |
| Bloc of Communists and Non-Partisans | Independents | 59,542,993 | 99.46 | 159 |
| Against | | 320,496 | 0.54 | – |
| Total | | 59,863,489 | 100.00 | 727 |
| Valid votes | | 59,863,489 | 99.88 | |
| Invalid/blank votes | | 73,226 | 0.12 | |
| Total votes | | 59,936,715 | 100.00 | |
| Registered voters/turnout | | 60,368,858 | 99.28 | |
Source: Open Text
