= Pamfilov =

Pamfilov (masculine, Russian: Памфилов) or Pamfilova (feminine, Russian: Памфилова) is a Russian surname. Notable people with the surname include:

- Ella Pamfilova (born 1953), Russian politician
- Konstantin Pamfilov (1901–1943), Soviet bureaucrat
