= Konstantin Pamfilov =

Soviet bureaucrat (1901–1943)

- Константин Памфилов

Acting Chairman of the Council of People's Commissars of the Russian SFSR
- In office 5 May 1942 – 2 May 1943
- President: Alexei Badayev
- Preceded by: Ivan Khokhlov
- Succeeded by: Ivan Khokhlov

Deputy Chairman of the Council of People's Commissars of the Russian SFSR
- In office 6 September 1940 – 2 May 1943
- Premier: Ivan Khokhlov

Personal details
- Born: 7 June 1901 Mamonovo, Dukhovshchinsky Uyezd, Smolensk Governorate, Russian Empire
- Died: 2 May 1943 (aged 41) Moscow, Soviet Union
- Party: Communist (1918–43)

Konstantin Dmitriyevich Pamfilov (Russian: Константин Дмитриевич Памфилов; 7 June [O.S. 25 May] 1901 – 2 May 1943) was a Soviet bureaucrat. Born in the village Mamonovo in the Dukhovshchinsky Uyezd of Smolensk Governorate in the family of an accountant. In 1915 he graduated two-year college. A member of the Communist Party since 1918. During the Russian Civil War he led a ChON detachment against Kulaks in the Smolensk region. Since 1938 is the People's Commissar of Public Utilities RSFSR. He died of heart failure. The urn with the ashes is in the Kremlin Wall Necropolis.

== Literature ==
- Москва. Энциклопедия. 1980 г.
- Абрамов Алексей. У Кремлёвской стены. – М., Политиздат, 1988. ISBN 5-250-00071-1
