= 1937 Soviet Union legislative election =

- 12 December 1937
- Soviet of the Union
- All 569 seats in the Soviet of the Union
Party	Seats
All-Union Communist Party (Bolsheviks)	461
Independents	108
This lists parties that won seats. See the complete results below.
- Soviet of Nationalities
- All 574 seats in the Soviet of Nationalities
Party	Seats
All-Union Communist Party (Bolsheviks)	409
Independents	165
This lists parties that won seats. See the complete results below.
Chairman of the Council of Ministers before	Chairman of the Council of Ministers after
Vyacheslav Molotov; CPSU	Vyacheslav Molotov; CPSU

Supreme Soviet elections were held in the Soviet Union on 12 December 1937. It was the first election held under the 1936 Soviet Constitution, which had formed the Supreme Soviet of the Soviet Union to replace the old legislature, the Congress of Soviets of the Soviet Union.

== Electoral system ==
The elections were originally announced as being multi-candidate; however, by halfway through the year the announcement was reversed due to the leadership worrying about the possible emergence of political opposition. However, during that early period a number of individuals attempted to hold the government to the multi-candidate promise, including members of the Russian Orthodox Church who attempted to field religious candidates as a result of Article 124 of the new constitution, which promised freedom of religion. Many of the early individuals attempting to run as alternate candidates were arrested after the decision for multiple candidates was reversed. Additionally, the NKVD conducted mass arrests shortly before the elections.

== Conduct ==
Despite the mass arrests and with the tone more subdued than with elections held in 1929, there were still minor waves of dissent and opposition to candidates, especially major political figures (including Mikhail Kalinin, Anastas Mikoyan, and even Joseph Stalin himself) as well as celebrities (such as Aleksei Tolstoy) and candidates opposed on the basis of ethnicity (such as ethnic Russians running in the Ukrainian SSR).

== Results ==
=== Soviet of the Union ===
Party or alliance		Votes	%	Seats
BKB	All-Union Communist Party (Bolsheviks)	89,844,271	99.30	461
BKB	Independents	89,844,271	99.30	108
Against		632,074	0.70	–
Total		90,476,345	100.00	569
Valid votes		90,476,345	99.30	
Invalid/blank votes		636,808	0.70	
Total votes		91,113,153	100.00	
Registered voters/turnout		94,138,159	96.79	
Source: Nohlen & Stöver

=== Soviet of Nationalities ===
Party or alliance		Votes	%	Seats
BKB	All-Union Communist Party (Bolsheviks)	89,063,169	99.37	409
BKB	Independents	89,063,169	99.37	165
Against		562,402	0.63	–
Total		89,625,571	100.00	574
Valid votes		89,625,571	98.37	
Invalid/blank votes		1,487,582	1.63	
Total votes		91,113,153	100.00	
Registered voters/turnout		94,138,159	96.79	
Source: Nohlen & Stöver

== External sources ==
- "State and Society Under Stalin: Constitutions and Elections in the 1930s," article by J. Arch Getty in Slavic Review, Vol. 50, No. 1 (Spring, 1991).
- The Distinctiveness of Soviet Law. Ferdinand Joseph Maria Feldbrugge, ed. Martinus Nijhoff Publishers: Dordrecht (1987): 110–112.
- Fitzpatrick, Sheila. 1999. Everyday Stalinism: Ordinary Life in Extraordinary Times: Soviet Russia in the 1930s. New York: Oxford University Press, pp. 179–182.
- Kalinin speech in elections to the Supreme Soviet 1937
