= List of heads of state of Russia =

This is the list of the heads of state of Russia after the abolition of the monarchy in 1917.

== Russian Republic (1917) ==
With the abdication of Emperor Nicholas II after the February Revolution of 1917, power in Russia passed to the Provisional Government formed by the liberal leadership of the Duma. Grand Duke Michael had refused to ascend to his older brother's throne without the consent of an elected Constituent Assembly, and it was broadly assumed that the Assembly would be the only body with the authority to change the form of government. However, after a failed coup attempt against the government, the Russian Republic was proclaimed by Minister-President Kerensky. The election was scheduled for 25 [O.S. 12] November 1917, yet when it finally took place, the power in the capital city of Petrograd had already switched to the Bolshevik revolutionaries. By that time, the government had been de facto dissolved, and the newly elected Assembly was also disbanded after its very first session by the Bolsheviks on 19 January 1918.

#	Picture	Name	Term of office		Party
Chairmen of the Provisional Government
		Georgy Lvov (1861–1925)	15 March 1917	21 July 1917	KD
		Alexander Kerensky (1881–1970)	21 July 1917	14 September 1917	PSR (Trudovik faction)
Minister-President
		Alexander Kerensky (1881–1970)	14 September 1917	7 November 1917	PSR (Trudovik faction)
Office vacant (until 19 January 1918)

== Russian State (1918–1920) ==
The October Revolution sparked a civil war across the former Russian Empire, with the most prominent factions being the Bolsheviks, loosely connected anti-Bolshevik governments and armies known as the White movement, as well as numerous independence movements loosely aligned with the Whites. Various anti-Bolshevik governments began to form across Russia since early 1918, initially emerging among the cossacks of Don and Kuban. In September 1918, the largest factions united into the Provisional All-Russian Government, creating the Russian State. Two months later, Admiral Alexander Kolchak headed the Russian State as a Supreme Ruler in result of a military coup. After Kolchak's defeat in 1920, the White movement started to decline, with most of its members leaving Russia in November 1920 under the command of General Pyotr Wrangel. Various social-democratic governments continued to function until June 1923, when the Bolsheviks suppressed the Yakut revolt in Priamurye.

#	Picture	Name	Term of office		Party
Chairmen of the Provisional Siberian Government
		Pyotr Derber (1883–1938)	29 January 1918	29 June 1918	PSR
		Pyotr Vologodsky (1863–1925)	30 June 1918	3 November 1918	PSR
Chairman of the Committee of Members of the Constituent Assembly
		Vladimir Volsky (1877–1937)	June 1918	September 1918	PSR
Chairman of the Provisional All-Russian Government
		Nikolai Avksentiev (1878–1943)	23 September 1918	18 November 1918	PSR
Supreme Ruler
		Alexander Kolchak (1874–1920)	18 November 1918	7 February 1920 †	White movement
Commanders-in-Chief of the Armed Forces of South Russia
		Anton Denikin (1872–1947)	8 January 1919	4 April 1920	White movement
		Pyotr Wrangel (1878–1928)	4 April 1920	21 November 1920	White movement
Chairmen of the Provisional Priamurye Government
		Spiridon Merkulov (1870–1957)	May 1921	23 July 1922	White movement
		Mikhail Diterikhs (1874–1937)	23 July 1922	25 October 1922	White movement
		Anatoly Pepelyayev; Acting	25 October 1922	16 June 1923	White movement

== Russian Soviet Federative Socialist Republic (1917–1991) ==
On 30 December 1922, the Russian Soviet Republic, along with the Soviet pro-Bolshevik republics of Ukraine, Belarus and the Southern Caucasus were merged into the Soviet Union, with the Russian SFSR authorities holding the authority of the highly centralized country, which was governed by a leader of the Communist Party or a collective leadership (Politburo). In 1938, the Supreme Soviet of the RSFSR was formed. Following the adoption of amendments to the Constitution in 1989, the office of Chairman of the Presidium was removed, and the position of the Russian head of state passed directly to the Chairman of the Supreme Soviet in May 1990.

During nearly all Soviet era, 1917–1990, the de-facto rulers were the leaders of the Communist Party of the Soviet Union; see List of leaders of the Soviet Union.

No.	Portrait	Name (Birth–Death)	Term of office		Political party
No.	Portrait	Name (Birth–Death)	Took office	Left office	Political party
Chairman of the Central Executive Committee of the All-Russian Congress of Soviets (1917–1938)
1		Lev Kamenev (1883–1936)	9 November 1917	21 November 1917	Communist Party
2		Yakov Sverdlov (1885–1919)	21 November 1917	16 March 1919	Communist Party
—		Mikhail Vladimirsky (1874–1951); Acting	16 March 1919	30 March 1919	Communist Party
5		Mikhail Kalinin (1875–1946)	30 March 1919	15 July 1938	Communist Party
Chairman of the Supreme Soviet of the Russian SFSR (1938)
6		Andrei Zhdanov (1896–1948)	15 July 1938	19 July 1938	Communist Party
Chairman of the Presidium of the Supreme Soviet of the Russian SFSR (1938–1990)
7		Aleksei Badayev (1883–1951)	19 July 1938	4 March 1944	Communist Party
—		Ivan Vlasov (1903–1969); Acting	9 April 1943	4 March 1944	Communist Party
8		Nikolai Shvernik (1888–1970)	4 March 1944	25 June 1946	Communist Party
9		Ivan Vlasov (1903–1969)	25 June 1946	7 July 1950	Communist Party
10		Mikhail Tarasov (1899–1970)	7 July 1950	16 April 1959	Communist Party
11		Nikolai Ignatov (1901–1966)	16 April 1959	26 November 1959	Communist Party
12		Nikolai Organov (1901–1982)	26 November 1959	20 December 1962	Communist Party
(11)		Nikolai Ignatov (1901–1966)	20 December 1962	14 November 1966	Communist Party
13		Mikhail Yasnov (1906–1991)	23 December 1966	26 March 1985	Communist Party
14		Vladimir Orlov (1921–1999)	26 March 1985	3 October 1988	Communist Party
15		Vitaly Vorotnikov (1926–2012)	3 October 1988	29 May 1990	Communist Party
Chairman of the Supreme Soviet of the Russian SFSR (1990–1991)
16		Boris Yeltsin (1931–2007)	29 May 1990	10 July 1991	Independent
President of the Russian SFSR (1991)
(16)		Boris Yeltsin (1931–2007)	10 July 1991	25 December 1991	Independent

== Russian Federation (since 1991) ==
On 17 March 1991, the all-Russian referendum on the introduction of presidency was held. More than 70% of citizens voted for the introduction of the office. On 12 June, Boris Yeltsin won 57% of the popular vote in the first democratic presidential election. Yeltsin's inauguration took place on 10 July. On 12 December, Russia ratified the Belovezh Accords, thus dissolving the Soviet Union. On 25 December, the Russian Soviet Federative Socialist Republic was renamed Russian Federation, with the names of the state and its highest executive office constitutionally amended in 1992. The office got its current status with the adoption of a new constitution in 1993, following an armed dispute between the president and the parliament.

Presidents
#	Picture	Name	Term of office		Elected	Party
1		Boris Yeltsin (1931–2007)	10 July 1991	21 September 1993	1991	Independent
—		Alexander Rutskoy (b. 1947); Acting; disputed	22 September 1993	4 October 1993	—	People's Party "Free Russia"
1		Boris Yeltsin (1931–2007)	4 October 1993	5 November 1996	—	Independent
1		Boris Yeltsin (1931–2007)	4 October 1993	5 November 1996	1996	Independent
—		Viktor Chernomyrdin (1938–2010); Acting	5 November 1996	6 November 1996	—	Our Home – Russia
1		Boris Yeltsin (1931–2007)	6 November 1996	31 December 1999 (resigned)	—	Independent
—		Vladimir Putin (b. 1952); Acting until 7 May 2000	31 December 1999	7 May 2000	—	Independent (formally); Unity / United Russia (de facto)
2		Vladimir Putin (b. 1952); Acting until 7 May 2000	7 May 2000	7 May 2008	2000	Independent (formally); Unity / United Russia (de facto)
		Vladimir Putin (b. 1952); Acting until 7 May 2000	7 May 2000	7 May 2008	2004	Independent (formally); Unity / United Russia (de facto)
3		Dmitry Medvedev (b. 1965)	7 May 2008	7 May 2012	2008	United Russia; All-Russia People's Front (since 2011)
2		Vladimir Putin (b. 1952)	7 May 2012	Incumbent	2012	Independent (formally); All-Russia People's Front; United Russia (de facto)
2		Vladimir Putin (b. 1952)	7 May 2012	Incumbent	2018	Independent (formally); All-Russia People's Front; United Russia (de facto)
2		Vladimir Putin (b. 1952)	7 May 2012	Incumbent	2024	Independent (formally); All-Russia People's Front; United Russia (de facto)
