= Vitaly Vorotnikov =

Soviet politician (1926–2012)

- Виталий Воротников

Chairman of the Presidium of the Supreme Soviet of the Russian SFSR
- In office 3 October 1988 – 29 May 1990
- Premier: Aleksandr Vlasov
- Preceded by: Vladimir Orlov
- Succeeded by: Boris Yeltsin (as Chairman of the Supreme Soviet of the Russian SFSR)

Chairman of the Council of Ministers of the Russian SFSR
- In office 24 June 1983 – 3 October 1988
- President: Mikhail Yasnov; Vladimir Orlov
- Preceded by: Mikhail Solomentsev
- Succeeded by: Aleksandr Vlasov

First Secretary of the Krasnodar Regional Committee
- In office 23 July 1982 – 27 June 1983
- Preceded by: Sergei Medunov
- Succeeded by: Georgy Razumovsky

First Secretary of the Voronezh Regional Committee
- In office 8 February 1971 – 11 July 1975
- Preceded by: Nikolai Miroshnichenko
- Succeeded by: Vadim Ignatov

Soviet Ambassador to Cuba
- In office 8 February 1971 – 11 July 1975
- Preceded by: Nikita Tolobyev
- Succeeded by: Konstantin Katushev

Full member of the 26th, 27th Politburo
- In office 26 December 1983 – 14 July 1990

Personal details
- Born: Vitaly Ivanovich Vorotnikov; 20 January 1926 Voronezh, Russian SFSR, Soviet Union
- Died: 19 February 2012 (aged 86) Moscow, Russia
- Party: Communist Party of the Soviet Union (1950–1990)
- Education: Kuybyshev Aviation Institute

Vitaly Ivanovich Vorotnikov (Russian: Виталий Иванович Воротников; 20 January 1926 – 19 February 2012) was a Soviet politician and diplomat who was the Chairman of the Presidium of the Supreme Soviet of the Russian SFSR between 1988 and 1990.

== Early life and education ==
Vorotnikov was born in Voronezh, and in 1940 entered a local Aviation Industry community college, majoring in aircraft engine technology. After the Soviet Union entered World War II and adult workers left for the Red Army service, 16-year-old Vitaly took a job at the Voronezh Steam Locomotive Repair plant. Soon the front line approached the city, and he was evacuated to Kuybyshev, where he spent most of the war working for Kuibyshev aviation plant No. 18 and studying at Kuybyshev Aviation Technology School.

== Career ==
After graduation, Vorotnikov kept working at the plant after the war in both managerial and Communist Party organizing positions. At the same time he was taking evening classes at the Kuybyshev Aviation Institute, finally earning his engineering degree in 1954.

From the position of the chairman of the Communist Party committee at his plant (1950–1960) Vorotnikov advanced to a position of responsibility in the Kuybyshev Oblast Part Committee (1960). After occupying a number of positions of regional importance in Russia's Kuybyshev and Voronezh Oblasts for almost 20 years, he served as the Soviet ambassador to Cuba from 1979 to 1982. In fact, he was exiled by Brezhnev to this post.

After being recalled from Cuba when Brezhnev died and a short stint in charge of the Communists of Krasnodar Krai, Vorotnikov was finally brought to Moscow, where he was to occupy the top positions in the government of the RSFSR. He became a candidate member of the Politburo and soon a full member. From 1983 to 1988 he was the Chairman of the Council of Ministers of the RSFSR, and from 1988 to 1990 Chairman of the Presidium of the Supreme Soviet of the Russian SFSR. During his long retirement, Vorotnikov wrote several volumes of memoirs.

== Death ==
Vorotnikov died on 19 February 2012 at the age of 86.

== Decorations and awards ==
- Hero of Socialist Labour (1986)
- Four Orders of Lenin (1971, 1973, 1982 and 1986)
- Order of the October Revolution
- Order of the Patriotic War, 1st class
- Order of the Red Banner of Labour, three times
- Order of the Badge of Honour
- Order of Honour
- Gold Medal of the Exhibition of Economic Achievements, three times
- Order of Solidarity (Cuba, 1982)
- Honorary Citizen of Voronezh (1996)
