= Mikhail Solomentsev =

Soviet politician and bureaucrat (1913–2008)

- Михаил Соломенцев
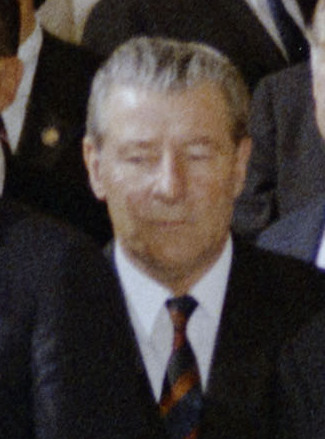
- Solomentsev in 1972

Chairman of the Party Control Committee of the Central Committee
- In office 15 June 1983 – 30 September 1988
- Preceded by: Arvīds Pelše
- Succeeded by: Boris Pugo

Chairman of the Council of Ministers of the Russian SFSR
- In office 28 July 1971 – 24 June 1983
- President: Mikhail Yasnov
- Preceded by: Gennady Voronov
- Succeeded by: Vitaly Vorotnikov

Full member of the 26th, 27th Politburo
- In office 26 December 1983 – 30 September 1988

Member of the 23rd, 24th Secretariat
- In office 13 December 1966 – 23 November 1971

Personal details
- Born: 7 November 1913 Village Yerilovka, Yeletsky Uyezd, Oryol Governorate, Russian Empire
- Died: 15 February 2008 (aged 94) Moscow, Russia
- Party: Communist Party of the Soviet Union (1940–1988)

Mikhail Sergeyevich Solomentsev (Russian: Михаи́л Серге́евич Соло́менцев; 7 November [O.S. 25 October] 1913 – 15 February 2008) was a Soviet politician and bureaucrat.

== Early life ==
He was born in a village Yerilovka in the Yeletsky Uyezd, and graduated from the Leningrad Technological Institute in 1940.

== Career ==
Solomentsev was a leading Communist Party functionary in Kazakhstan during 1962–1964 and was in charge of the Rostov-on-Don obkom from 1964–1966. He served as a secretary of the Central Committee of the Communist Party of the Soviet Union during the years 1966–1971. Solomontsev was Chairman of the Council of Ministers of the Russian RSFR starting from 1971 and ending in 1983. He sat in the Politburo from 1983 until he was sacked by Mikhail Gorbachev in 1988. In October 1987 he led a Commission of the Politburo to look into the “purge” trials of the 1930s. The commission also included KGB Chief Viktor Chebrikov and Alexander Yakovlev. Yakovlev subsequently took over the chairmanship of the Commission.

== Decorations and awards ==
- Twice Hero of Socialist Labour (1973; 1983)
- Five Orders of Lenin (19 July 1958; 5 August 1966; 2 December 1971; 5 November 1973; 5 November 1983)
- Two Orders of the Red Banner of Labour (11 January 1957; 5 November 1963)
- Medal "For Labour Valour" (25 December 1959)
- Order of the Patriotic War, 1st class (23 April 1985)
- Order of the Red Star (16 September 1945)
