= Mikhail Yasnov =

Soviet politician (1906–1991)

- Михаил Яснов
- Yasnov in 1970

Chairman of the Presidium of the Supreme Soviet of the Russian SFSR
- In office 23 December 1966 – 26 March 1985
- Premier: Gennady Voronov; Mikhail Solomentsev; Vitaly Vorotnikov
- Preceded by: Nikolai Ignatov
- Succeeded by: Vladimir Orlov

Chairman of the Council of Ministers of the Russian SFSR
- In office 24 January 1956 – 19 December 1957
- President: Mikhail Tarasov
- Preceded by: Alexander Puzanov
- Succeeded by: Frol Kozlov

Chairman of the Executive Committee of the Moscow City Council
- In office 18 January 1950 – 2 February 1956
- Preceded by: Georgy Popov
- Succeeded by: Nikolai Bobrovnikov

Personal details
- Born: 5 June 1906 Kostroma Oblast, Russian Empire
- Died: 23 July 1991 (aged 85) Moscow, Russian SFSR, Soviet Union
- Party: Communist Party of the Soviet Union
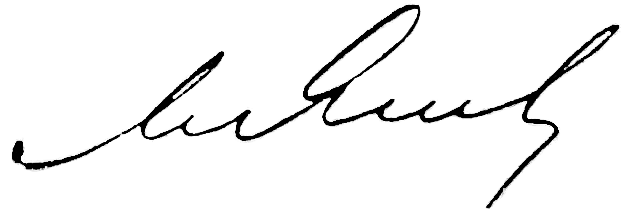
- Signature

Mikhail Alekseyevich Yasnov (Russian: Михаил Алексеевич Яснов; 5 June 1906 [O.S. 23 May] – 23 July 1991) was a Soviet politician. He was Chairman of the Moscow City Executive Committee and head of Moscow in 1950–1956.

Between 1956 and 1957 he was the Chairman of the Council of Ministers of the Russian SFSR. Between 1957 and 1966 he was First Deputy Chairman of the Council of Ministers of the RSFSR and between 1966 and 1985 he was Chairman of the Presidium of the Supreme Soviet (head of state) and later deputy. Between 1950 and 1956 he was Chairman of the Soviet of the Union, the upper chamber of the Supreme Soviet of the Soviet Union. He was made a Hero of Socialist Labor in 1976.
