= Elections in the Soviet Union =

Overview of the electoral system of the Soviet Union

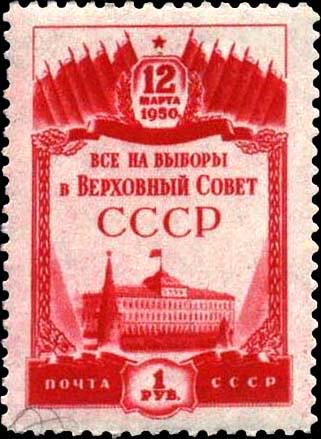
1950 postage stamp marking that year's election

The electoral system of the Union of Soviet Socialist Republics was varying over time, being based upon Chapter XIII of the provisional Fundamental Law of 1922, articles 9 and 10 of the 1924 Constitution and Chapter XI of the 1936 Constitution, with the electoral laws enacted in conformity with those. The Constitution and laws applied to elections in all Soviets, from the Supreme Soviet of the Soviet Union, the Union republics and autonomous republics, through to regions, districts and towns. Voting was claimed to be secret and direct with universal suffrage. However, in practice, between 1936 and 1989, voters could vote against candidates preselected by the Communist Party only by spoiling their ballots, or by voting against the only candidate, whereas votes for the party candidates could be cast simply by submitting a blank ballot. A person would be given a ballot by a clerk, and could immediately walk to the ballot box, and while there were booths in which one could strike the candidates they voted against off the ballot, this was easy to record and was not commonly done by voters.

A 1945 decree allowed for members of the Red Army stationed outside the Soviet Union to vote for both chambers of the Supreme Soviet of the USSR (the Soviet of the Union and Soviet of Nationalities) in special 100,000-member districts. These were first enacted in the 1946 legislative elections and continued through the next decades as the Red Army continued its presence in the Eastern Bloc.

== Last election ==
=== Soviet of the Union ===
Party	Votes	%	Seats	+/–
Communist Party of the Soviet Union	183,897,278	99.94	551	+2
Independents	183,897,278	99.94	199	–2
Against	109,078	0.06	0	0
Total	184,006,356	100.00	750	0
Valid votes	184,006,356	100.00		
Invalid/blank votes	17	0.00		
Total votes	184,006,373	100.00		
Registered voters/turnout	184,029,412	99.99		

=== Soviet of Nationalities ===
Party	Votes	%	Seats	+/–
Communist Party of the Soviet Union	183,592,183	99.77	521	–5
Independents	183,592,183	99.77	229	+5
Against	414,172	0.23	0	0
Total	184,006,355	100.00	750	0
Valid votes	184,006,355	100.00		
Invalid/blank votes	18	0.00		
Total votes	184,006,373	100.00		
Registered voters/turnout	184,029,412	99.99		

== First election ==
=== All-Union Congress of Soviets ===
Party	Seats
Russian Communist Party (Bolsheviks)	2,082
Independents	127
Poale Zion	2
Georgian Socialist-Federalist Revolutionary Party	2
Anarchists	1
Total	2,214

== Electoral system defined by the Soviet Constitution ==
=== 1922 provisional Fundamental Law ===
Chapter XIII

ARTICLE 64. The right to vote and to be elected to the soviets is enjoyed by the following citizens of both sexes, irrespective of religion, nationality, domicile, etc., of the Russian Soviet Federative Socialist Republic, who shall have completed their eighteenth year by the day of election:

(a) All who have acquired the means of livelihood through labor that is productive and useful to society, and also persons engaged in housekeeping which enables the former to do productive work, i.e., laborers and employees of all classes who are employed in industry, trade, agriculture, etc., and peasants and Cossack agricultural laborers who employ no help for the purpose of making profits. (b) Soldiers of the army and navy of the soviets. (c) Citizens of the two preceding categories who have in any degree lost their capacity to work.

NOTE 1: Local soviets may, upon approval of the central power, lower the age standard mentioned herein.

NOTE 2: Non-citizens mentioned in Section 20 (Article Two, Chapter 5) have the right to vote.

ARTICLE 65. The following persons enjoy neither the right to vote nor the right to be voted for, even though they belong to one of the categories enumerated above, namely:

(a) Persons who employ hired labor in order to obtain from it an increase in profits; (b) Persons who have an income without doing any work, such as interest from capital, receipts from property, etc.; (c) Private merchants, trade and commercial brokers; (d) Monks and clergy of all denominations; (e) Employees and agents of the former police, the gendarme corps, and the Okhrana (Czar's secret service), also members of the former reigning dynasty; (f) Persons who have in legal form been declared demented or mentally deficient, and also persons under guardianship; (g) Persons who have been deprived by a soviet of their rights of citizenship because of selfish or dishonorable offenses, for the period fixed by the sentence.

Chapter XIV

ARTICLE 66. Elections are conducted according to custom on days fixed by the local soviets.

ARTICLE 67. Election takes place in the presence of an election committee and the representation of the local soviet.

ARTICLE 68. In case the representative of the soviet cannot for valid causes be present, the chairman of the election committee takes his place, and in case the latter is absent, the chairman of the election meeting replaces him.

ARTICLE 69. Minutes of the proceedings and result of elections are to be compiled and signed by the members of the election committee and the representative of the soviet.

ARTICLE 70. Detailed instructions regarding the election proceedings and the participation in them of professional and other workers' organizations are to be issued by the local soviets, according to the instructions of the All-Russian Central Executive Committee.

=== 1924 Constitution ===
Chapter III: Congress of the Soviets of the Union

ARTICLE 9. The Congress of Soviets of the USSR is composed of representatives of the urban Soviets and of the Soviets of the urban type, on the basis of one deputy per 25,000 electors, and of representatives of the Congresses of Soviets of the rural districts on the basis of one deputy per 125,000 inhabitants.

ARTICLE 10. The delegates to the Congress of the Soviets of the USSR are elected in the Congresses of Soviets of the rural and urban governments. In the Republics where there does not exist a rural division, the delegates are elected directly to the Congress of Soviets of the respective Republic.

=== 1936 Constitution ===
Chapter XI : The Electoral System

ARTICLE 134. Members of all Soviets of Working People's Deputies - of the Supreme Soviet of the U.S.S.R., the Supreme Soviets of the Union Republics, the Soviets of Working People's Deputies of the Territories and Regions, the Supreme Soviets of the Autonomous Republics, the Soviets of Working People's Deputies of Autonomous Regions, area, district, city and rural (stanitsa, village, hamlet, kishlak, aul) Soviets of Working People's Deputies - are chosen by the electors on the basis of universal, direct and equal suffrage by secret ballot.

ARTICLE 135. Elections of deputies are universal: all citizens of the U.S.S.R. who have reached the age of eighteen, irrespective of race or nationality, religion, educational and residential qualifications, social origin, property status or past activities, have the right to vote in the election of deputies and to be elected, with the exception of insane persons and persons who have been convicted by a court of law and whose sentences include deprivation of electoral rights.

ARTICLE 136. Elections of deputies are equal: each citizen has one vote; all citizens participate in elections on an equal footing.

ARTICLE 137. Women have the right to elect and be elected on equal terms with men.

ARTICLE 138. Citizens serving in the Red Army have the right to elect and be elected on equal terms with all other citizens.

ARTICLE 139. Elections of deputies are direct: all Soviets of Working People's Deputies from rural and city Soviets of Working People's Deputies to the Supreme Soviet of the U.S.S.R., inclusive, are elected by the citizens by direct vote.

ARTICLE 140. Voting at elections of deputies is secret.

ARTICLE 141. Candidates for election are nominated according to electoral areas.

The right to nominate candidates is secured to public organizations and societies of the working people : Communist Party organizations, trade unions, cooperatives, youth organizations and cultural societies.

ARTICLE 142. It is the duty of every deputy to report to his electors on his work and on the work of the Soviet of Working People's Deputies, and he is liable to be recalled at any time in the manner established by law upon decision of a majority of the electors.

== Election process ==
Before the proclamation of the 1936 Constitution, elections to soviets of all levels beyond local urban and rural ones (with varying ratios of citizens-per-representative each) were indirect, carried out by soviets of lesser scale below them. However, direct elections for township or industrial soviets were allowed to be competitive in theory, with candidates of different organizations other than the Communist Party and even the Orthodox Church allowed to fill the paperwork, although constant disenfranchisement of their voters and persecution of any activism during the campaign was the norm.

Soviet Citizens were able to vote for representatives to represent them in the Supreme Soviet of the Soviet Union, which was the legislative arm of the Soviet Union. The elections in the Soviet Union would be held every 4 years for the citizens to go to the polling station and vote for a single candidate. These candidates who were going to be elected for 4 years were approved by the Communist Party themselves and were the only option on the ballot.

The reasoning for a single candidate was to make sure the people of the Soviet Union saw the party unified with no hint of party instability through multiple candidates vying for the same position in the Congress of the Soviets. The candidates could either be Communist or independent but they had to be approved by the Communist Party.

== Reasons for the elections ==
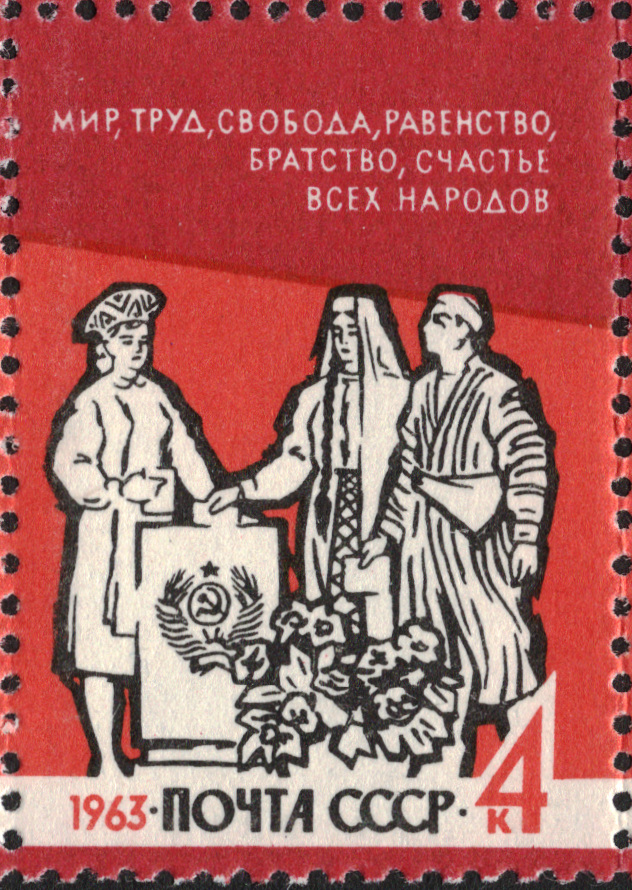
1963 stamp depicting ethnic minorities in traditional costume casting their ballots.

In order to keep the public display of personal reaffirmation, elections were held not to please the citizens of the Soviet Union, instead, they were meant to show unity within the population. If Stalin was able to amass a large voter turnout, even though it was for one candidate, he could be viewed as a legitimate leader.

Endorsing a candidate with one's vote shows a high amount of patriotism coming from Soviet citizens because it displays commitment and satisfaction from the citizen on government policy. Anita Pisch argues that Stalin's obsession to create an almost cult-like following “Stalin came to be portrayed in a manner that suggested a dual, Christ-like nature, or deity.” To have a high amount of patriotism under his rule gave him the ability to choose whatever he wanted without large repercussions.

Even with a single candidate on the ballot, representatives could theoretically fail to get elected in the Soviet Union, but this did not happen above the lowest levels. A representative would have to keep local improvements satisfactory in order to try to gain greater than a 50% vote. Although not the definition of democracy, the Soviet people would still have the choice to keep or to basically "request" a new candidate from the Communist Party. Although selected by the Communist Party, each representative had to some degree keep their population somewhat satisfied with the way they were governing their people. With the threshold of a 50% vote, many unsatisfied Soviets would form groups and would lobby to have their voices heard. This would allow the dissenters to have a small amount of input on how some things should be run in the Soviet Union. However, group dissent was extremely rare due to opposition from the authorities.

During Soviet elections it was common for the average Soviet citizen to cast several ballots. These multiplied ballots would make up around seven ballots per person. As Gilison mentions, if there are approximately two million negative votes cast in an election "dissenters" would approximately represent 500,000 to 700,000 votes in that election. These individuals would try to sway an election in order to discredit the election.

== Signing of the 1936 Soviet Constitution ==
On December 5, 1936, the second Soviet Constitution was signed, replacing the original constitution of 1924. The new constitution was enacted by the former Congress of Soviets and signed by former General Secretary Joseph Stalin. As a result, the Congress of Soviets was dismantled and replaced by a new Supreme Soviet. The new constitution enshrined the Communist Party of the Soviet Union (CPSU) as the sole ruling party. In accordance with the provisions of the constitution, the nation prepared for the first legislative elections scheduled for the future Supreme Soviet (both federal and republican).

== Structure of the Supreme Soviet ==
The new constitution created a bicameral legislature system consisting of two chambers, The Soviet of the Union and The Soviet of Nationalities. The Soviet of the Union was a group of deputies or representatives that entailed one deputy for every 300,000 Soviet citizens. These deputies were directly elected by the Soviet people through a means of universal suffrage. Each deputy was elected for a term of four years. On the other hand, The Soviet of Nationalities was ethnically separated. It consisted of representatives from each of the union republics, autonomous republics, autonomous oblasts, and autonomous okrugs. The union republic was granted 32 deputies each, giving them higher power over the other regions/republics. However, as the list goes down from union republics to autonomous okrugs, less and less deputies were appointed regardless of population size. Similar to The Soviet of the Union, each senator in the latter chamber was elected for a term of four years.

== 1937 election ==
=== Soviet of the Union ===
Party or alliance		Votes	%	Seats
BKB	All-Union Communist Party (Bolsheviks)	89,844,271	99.30	461
BKB	Independents	89,844,271	99.30	108
Against		632,074	0.70	0
Total		90,476,345	100.00	569
Valid votes		90,476,345	99.30	
Invalid/blank votes		636,808	0.70	
Total votes		91,113,153	100.00	
Registered voters/turnout		94,138,159	96.79	
Source: Nohlen & Stöver

=== Soviet of Nationalities ===
Party or alliance		Votes	%	Seats
BKB	All-Union Communist Party (Bolsheviks)	89,063,169	99.37	409
BKB	Independents	89,063,169	99.37	165
Against		562,402	0.63	0
Total		89,625,571	100.00	574
Valid votes		89,625,571	98.37	
Invalid/blank votes		1,487,582	1.63	
Total votes		91,113,153	100.00	
Registered voters/turnout		94,138,159	96.79	

Shortly after the signing of the new constitution, elections were held for the Supreme Soviet, the first under the new constitution. As promised by the government a multi-candidate election was held but was soon corrupted after the Great Purge, a time of political distrust and oppression. Many political candidates and threats to the CPSU were arrested as part of an effort to ensure the victory of the Communist party. As a result, only one candidate was left standing halfway through the election process, Joseph Stalin's choice, Vyacheslav Molotov. Molotov had won both the Soviet of the Union and the Soviet of Nationalities through a landslide vote of Party deputies during the elections for the Premier. The CPSU and Stalin were victorious in these elections, dominating the Soviet of the Union by a vote of 461 deputies to 108 and the Soviet of the Nationalities by a vote of 409 deputies to 165.

Mikhail Kalinin was elected as the first Chairman of the Presidium. Vyacheslav Molotov was reelected Premier of the Soviet Union for the last time as Stalin would replace him as premier in 1941 with Stalin himself.

== 1946 election ==
=== Soviet of the Union ===
Party or alliance		Votes	%	Seats	+/–
Bloc of Communists and Non-Partisans	All-Union Communist Party (Bolsheviks)	100,621,225	99.19	576	+115
Bloc of Communists and Non-Partisans	Independents	100,621,225	99.19	106	–2
Against		819,699	0.81	0	0
Total		101,440,924	100.00	682	+113
Valid votes		101,440,924	99.99		
Invalid/blank votes		10,012	0.01		
Total votes		101,450,936	100.00		
Registered voters/turnout		101,717,686	99.74		

=== Soviet of Nationalities ===
Party or alliance		Votes	%	Seats	+/–
Bloc of Communists and Non-Partisans	All-Union Communist Party (Bolsheviks)	100,603,567	99.19	509	+100
Bloc of Communists and Non-Partisans	Independents	100,603,567	99.19	148	–17
Against		818,955	0.81	0	0
Total		101,422,522	100.00	657	+83
Valid votes		101,422,522	99.97		
Invalid/blank votes		28,414	0.03		
Total votes		101,450,936	100.00		
Registered voters/turnout		101,717,686	99.74		

The night of February 9, 1946, Stalin walked out onto a stage and was greeted by a grand audience of voters. He proceeded to deliver a speech to those in attendance and for those listening at home through radio. In his speech, he glorified the Soviet Union's role in the victory of World War II and emphasized the importance of having a strong and successful social system.

“Our victory signifies, first of all, that our Soviet social system was victorious, that the Soviet social system successfully passed the test of fire in the war and proved that it is fully viable. [...] The war proved that the Soviet social system is a genuinely people's system, which grew up from the ranks of the people and enjoys their powerful support; that the Soviet social system is fully viable and stable form of organization of society.” (Stalin 1945).

The election for Supreme Soviet was held the next day. Out of an eligible population of 101,718,000, approximately 325,000 people had their voting rights revoked for a multitude of reasons. Also for the first time, members of the Red Army were allowed to cast their votes outside of the Soviet Union, in small districts of 100,000 each. The final results saw a clear Communist victory in both chambers of the Supreme Soviet, in which Nikolai Shvernik won his first full term as Chairman of the Presidum, after being named acting chairman following the passing of Mikhail Kalinin.

As a result, Joseph Stalin was reelected as premier, his first full term of four years as head of government. This time, Stalin received 682 deputy votes within the Soviet of the Union and 657 deputies in the Soviet of Nationalities. This was a large increase from the previous election and showed a positive growth rate for voter support for him.

== 1950 election ==
=== Soviet of the Union ===
Party or alliance		Votes	%	Seats	+/–
BKB	All-Union Communist Party (Bolsheviks)	110,788,377	99.73	580	+4
BKB	Independents	110,788,377	99.73	98	–8
Against		300,146	0.27	0	0
Total		111,088,523	100.00	678	–4
Valid votes		111,088,523	100.00		
Invalid/blank votes		1,487	0.00		
Total votes		111,090,010	100.00		
Registered voters/turnout		111,116,373	99.98		

=== Soviet of Nationalities ===
Party or alliance		Votes	%	Seats	+/–
BKB	All-Union Communist Party (Bolsheviks)	110,782,009	99.72	519	+10
BKB	Independents	110,782,009	99.72	119	–29
Against		306,830	0.28	0	0
Total		111,088,839	100.00	638	–19
Valid votes		111,088,839	100.00		
Invalid/blank votes		1,619	0.00		
Total votes		111,090,458	100.00		
Registered voters/turnout		111,116,373	99.98		

The 1950 election would be the last election Joseph Stalin ever ran in as head of government. Similar to previous elections, he was the only name on the ballot when the time came to elect a new Council of Ministers, and he was reelected one final time as Premier.

Of the 111,116,378 eligible voters, 111,090,010 came to vote. The results showed a large favor for the CPSU, as it received 678 votes from the Soviet of The Union (580 CPSU) and 638 votes from the Soviet of Nationalities (519 CPSU), with the rest coming from independent candidates and Komsomol nominees representing the youth. Nikolai Shvernik was reelected Chairman of the Presidium.

== 1954 election ==
=== Soviet of the Union ===
Party or alliance		Votes	%	Seats	+/–
BKB	Communist Party of the Soviet Union	120,479,249	99.79	565	–15
BKB	Independents	120,479,249	99.79	143	+45
Against		247,897	0.21	0	0
Total		120,727,146	100.00	708	+30
Valid votes		120,727,146	100.00		
Invalid/blank votes		680	0.00		
Total votes		120,727,826	100.00		
Registered voters/turnout		120,750,816	99.98		
Source: Nohlen & Stöver

=== Soviet of Nationalities ===
Party or alliance		Votes	%	Seats	+/–
BKB	Communist Party of the Soviet Union	120,539,860	99.84	485	–34
BKB	Independents	120,539,860	99.84	154	+35
Against		187,357	0.16	0	0
Total		120,727,217	100.00	639	+1
Valid votes		120,727,217	100.00		
Invalid/blank votes		609	0.00		
Total votes		120,727,826	100.00		
Registered voters/turnout		120,750,816	99.98		

The 1954 elections were the first of the post-Stalin era of the Soviet Union, and the first time Nikita Khrushchev would participate, this time, as Party leader.

Total voter turnout was 120,750,816, which gave the CPSU a clear advantage, winning 1080 to 297 (independents), ensuring total control of the Supreme Soviet's two chambers. Georgy Malenkov was elected to his first full term as Premier, and Kliment Voroshilov was elected to his first full term as Chairman of the Presidium.

== 1958 election ==
=== Soviet of the Union ===
Party or alliance		Votes	%	Seats	+/–
BKB	Communist Party of the Soviet Union	133,214,652	99.57	563	–2
BKB	Independents	133,214,652	99.57	175	+32
Against		580,641	0.43	0	0
Total		133,795,293	100.00	738	+30
Valid votes		133,795,293	100.00		
Invalid/blank votes		798	0.00		
Total votes		133,796,091	100.00		
Registered voters/turnout		133,836,325	99.97		

=== Soviet of Nationalities ===
Party or alliance		Votes	%	Seats	+/–
BKB	Communist Party of the Soviet Union	133,431,524	99.73	485	0
BKB	Independents	133,431,524	99.73	155	+1
Against		363,736	0.27	0	0
Total		133,795,260	100.00	640	+1
Valid votes		133,795,260	100.00		
Invalid/blank votes		831	0.00		
Total votes		133,796,091	100.00		
Registered voters/turnout		133,836,325	99.97		

Held during the Khruschev Thaw this was the first ever federal legislative elections following the landmark address On the Cult of Personality and Its Consequences that ended the 20th Congress of the Communist Party of the Soviet Union in 1956. Many of the CPSU candidates to the Supreme Soviet that year expressed confidence that the gains of De-Stalinization would be further institutionalized in the legislature.

Total voter turnout that year was 133,796,091, and while the CPSU kept its supermajority in the Supreme Soviet (563 to 175 MPs in the Soviet of the Union, 485 to 155 senators in the Soviet of Nationalities), the independent/Komsomol faction grew in the former, with 32 new elected MPs. This time Nikita Khrushchev was elected to his first full term as Premier of the Soviet Union replacing Nikolai Bulganin, and Kliment Voroshilov was reelected for a second term as Chairman of the Presidum.

== Elections in the Post-Soviet states ==
- Armenia
- Azerbaijan
- Belarus
- Estonia
- (Georgia (country)) Georgia
- Kazakhstan
- Kyrgyzstan
- Latvia
- Lithuania
- Moldova
- Russia
- Tajikistan
- Turkmenistan
- Ukraine
- Uzbekistan

== See also ==
- Soviet democracy
- Elections in Russia
