= Yeletsky Uyezd =

Yeletsky Uyezd (Еле́цкий уезд) was one of the subdivisions of the Oryol Governorate of the Russian Empire. It was situated in the eastern part of the governorate. Its administrative centre was Yelets.

== Demographics ==
At the time of the Russian Empire Census of 1897, Yeletsky Uyezd had a population of 280,942. Of these, 98.6% spoke Russian, 0.9% Ukrainian, 0.3% Yiddish, 0.1% Polish and 0.1% German as their native language.
