= Ivan Vlasov =

Soviet politician (1903–1969)

- Иван Власов
- Vlasov in 1939

Chairman of the Presidium of the Supreme Soviet of the Russian SFSR
- In office 25 June 1946 – 7 July 1950
- Premier: Mikhail Rodionov; Boris Chernousov
- Preceded by: Nikolai Shvernik
- Succeeded by: Mikhail Tarasov
- Acting; 9 April 1943 – 4 March 1944
- Premier: Ivan Khokhlov; Alexei Kosygin
- Preceded by: Alexei Badayev
- Succeeded by: Nikolai Shvernik

Personal details
- Born: Ivan Alekseevich Vlasov; 23 September 1903 Nikolayevka, Temnikovsky Uyezd, Tambov Governorate, Russian Empire
- Died: 1969 (aged 65–66) Moscow, Russian SFSR, Soviet Union
- Resting place: Vagankovo Cemetery
- Citizenship: Soviet
- Party: CPSU (1929–1969)
- Education: Timiryazev Academy

Ivan Alekseyevich Vlasov (Russian: Иван Алексеевич Вла́сов; 10 September [O.S. 28 August] 1903 – 1969) was a Soviet and Russian politician the nominal head of state of the RSFSR twice during the rule of Joseph Stalin.

Vlasov was born in Nikolayevka, Temnikovsky Uyezd, Tambov Governorate, and died about aged 65 or 66, in Moscow.

Political offices
Preceded by Alexi Badayev	Chairman of the Presidium of the Supreme Soviet of the Russian SFSR; 1944	Succeeded by Nikolay Shvernik
Preceded by Nikolay Shvernik	Chairman of the Presidium of the Supreme Soviet of the Russian SFSR; 1946-1950	Succeeded by Mikhail Tarasov
