= Boris Chernousov =

Soviet politician (1908–1978)

- Борис Черноусов

Chairman of the Council of Ministers of the Russian SFSR
- In office 9 March 1949 – 20 October 1952
- President: Ivan Vlasov; Mikhail Tarasov
- Preceded by: Mikhail Rodionov
- Succeeded by: Alexander Puzanov

Personal details
- Born: 30 June 1908 Syzran, Simbirsk Governorate, Russian Empire
- Died: 2 January 1978 (aged 69) Moscow, Soviet Union
- Party: CPSU (1929–1978)

Boris Nikolayevich Chernousov (Russian: Борис Николаевич Черноусов; 30 June 1908 – 2 January 1978) was a Soviet politician who served as Premier of the Russian Soviet Federative Socialist Republic from 1949 to 1952, during the final years of Stalin's rule.

Chernousov was born in 1908 in Syzran to a family of a railway worker. He spent the second half of 1920s as a Komsomol activist in the Volga region, before moving to Moscow in 1929. In 1935 he graduated from the Moscow Power Engineering Institute. Chernousov quickly rose in ranks within the Communist party ending with the position of head of the department for trade unions, party and Komsomol organs within the CPSU Central Committee in 1948.

In 1949 Chernousov was appointed premier of the Soviet Russia, after his predecessor Mikhail Rodionov fell during the Leningrad affair. In October 1952, the 19th Congress of the CPSU decided to replace Chernousov with Alexander Puzanov. Chernousov was removed from all positions held in the Communist Party and was appointed director of the Moscow searchlight plant.

In 1955-1957 Boris Chernousov was deputy minister of the automobile industry of the USSR. He died 2 January 1978 and was buried at the Novodevichy Cemetery in Moscow.
