= Vasily Vakhrushev =

Soviet-Russian politician (1902–1947)

- Васи́лий Вахрушев
- Vakhrushev in the 1940s

Chairman of the Council of People's Commissars of the Russian SFSR
- In office 29 July 1939 – 2 June 1940
- President: Alexei Badayev
- Preceded by: Nikolai Bulganin (1938)
- Succeeded by: Ivan Khokhlov

People's Commissar for Coal Industry
- In office 12 October 1939 – 19 January 1946
- Premier: Vyacheslav Molotov; Joseph Stalin
- Preceded by: Position established
- Succeeded by: Aleksandr Zasyadko

Personal details
- Born: 28 February 1902 Tula, Imperial Russia
- Died: 13 January 1947 (aged 44) Moscow, Russian SFSR, Soviet Union
- Resting place: Kremlin Wall Necropolis, Moscow
- Party: All-Union Communist Party (bolsheviks)

Vasily Vasilyevich Vakhrushev (Russian: Васи́лий Васи́льевич Ва́хрушев; 28 February 1902 – 13 January 1947) was a Soviet and Russian politician who was from 1939 to 1940 the Chairman of the Council of People's Commissars of the Russian SFSR, equivalent to Prime Minister. He was also the People's Commissar for Coal Industry from 1939 to 1946. His ashes were buried at the Kremlin Wall Necropolis.

He was born in Tula as the son of a worker from the city. After graduating from secondary school, he pursued a career as a locksmith.
