= Alexander Puzanov =

Soviet bureaucrat and diplomat (1906–1998)

- Александр Пузанов

Ambassador of the Soviet Union to Afghanistan
- In office 3 October 1972 – 10 November 1979
- Preceded by: Sergey Kiktev
- Succeeded by: Fikryat Tabeyev

Ambassador of the Soviet Union to Bulgaria
- In office 12 April 1967 – 4 May 1972
- Preceded by: Nikolai Organov
- Succeeded by: Vladimir Bazovsky

Ambassador of the Soviet Union to Yugoslavia
- In office 30 June 1962 – 12 April 1967
- Preceded by: Alexei Yepishev
- Succeeded by: Ivan Benediktov

Ambassador of the Soviet Union to North Korea
- In office 22 February 1957 – 30 June 1962
- Preceded by: Vasily Ivanov
- Succeeded by: Vasily Moskovskiy

Chairman of the Council of Ministers of the Russian SFSR
- In office 20 October 1952 – 24 January 1956
- President: Mikhail Tarasov
- Preceded by: Boris Chernousov
- Succeeded by: Mikhail Yasnov

Candidate member of the 19th Presidium, Member of the CPSU Central Committee
- In office 16 October 1952 – 6 March 1953

First Secretary of the Kuibyshev Regional Committee of the CPSU
- In office 19 April 1946 – 21 October 1952
- Preceded by: Vasily Zhavoronkov
- Succeeded by: Mikhail Yefremov

Personal details
- Born: 25 October 1906 Lezhkovka, Russian Empire
- Died: 1 March 1998 (aged 91) Moscow, Russia
- Resting place: Vagankovo Cemetery
- Party: Communist Party of the Soviet Union

Alexander Mikhailovich Puzanov (Russian: Александр Михайлович Пузанов; 25 October [O.S. 12 October] 1906 – 1 March 1998) was a Soviet and Russian bureaucrat and diplomat who was from 1952 to 1956 the Chairman of the Council of Ministers of the Russian SFSR, literally meaning Premier or Prime Minister. He also served as the Soviet ambassador to North Korea from 1957 to 1962, to Yugoslavia from 1962 to 1967, to Bulgaria from 1967 to 1972 and to Afghanistan from 1972 to 1979.

== Diplomatic career ==
Puzanov also had a diplomatic career. He served as the Ambassador of the Soviet Union to North Korea from 1957 to 1962, to Yugoslavia from 1962 to 1967, to Bulgaria from 1967 to 1972 and to Afghanistan from 1972 to 1979.

=== North Korea ===
In February 1957, Puzanov arrived to North Korea to assume ambassadorship, by which time North Korean leader Kim Il Sung had largely consolidated power. During this time, Soviet leader Nikita Khrushchev promoted the concept of collective leadership, and the Soviet embassy in North Korea started advising Kim to either give up his position as Workers' Party of Korea leader or as premier. Kim wanted to retain both positions, but was prepared to yield one of the positions to a close ally; he recommended Choe Yong-gon to the Soviet embassy. However, by 1957, Kim started to advise the Soviet embassy against appointing Choe. Kim also proposed Kim Il, who had little political independence.

Over the following months, Kim Il Sung and his allies Nam Il and Pak Chong-ae started investigating the degree of the demands by the Soviet embassy. Puzanov did not push hard on the issue of division of powers, not giving meaningful answers when North Korea pressed on the issue. On 3 September 1957, Kim Il Sung visited the Soviet embassy, proposing to Puzanov that he should remain as premier for "two years or so" and that Choe Yong-gon was a poor candidate for the post. Puzanov gave no advice, only writing on his journal that "I got the impression that Kim Il-sung himself also does not want to quit the premier’s office". He wrote "I offered no opinion on the subject" regarding the position of the premier. He also offered no opinion when Nam Il informed him that it was the opinion of the entire Central Committee Presidium that Kim Il Sung should stay.

Puzanov's inaction led Kim to ignore Soviet advice. From 11 to 28 September, Puzanov was in Moscow; on 20 September, a new cabinet was formed, and Kim remained as premier. The Soviet Union did not react to Kim's reappointment. On 22 October 1957, Puzanov received instructions telling him not to act on the issue, apart from giving advice to the North Koreans to implement a division of power sometime in the future. According to North Korea historian Fyodor Tertitskiy, Puzanov's inaction was a key moment in allowing Kim to secure total control over North Korea.

On 24 September 1959, Puzanov was informed of the renovations of the Liberation Monument in Pyongyang. Done in the anticipation of an ultimately cancelled trip by Khrushchev to North Korea, the redesigns included the removal of Joseph Stalin's pictures from the monument. After being informed, Puzanov expressed his reservations, writing in his journal that "For my part, I expressed doubts about the expediency of replacing some of the inscriptions, although it really should be done on the eve of the arrival of our delegation".

=== Afghanistan ===
In October 1972, Puzanov was appointed as the Soviet ambassador to North Korea. During this time, the country was a semi-constitutional monarchy ruled by King Mohammed Zahir Shah, who was overthrown in the 1973 Afghan coup d'état which led to the establishment of the republic. In April 1978, the Democratic Republic of Afghanistan was established following the Saur Revolution. Puzanov encouraged intervention to his superiors in the Soviet Union, including by filing a report portraying Afghan leader Hafizullah Amin as a tyrant. He was recalled back to the Soviet Union in 1979 in the anticipation of a Soviet military intervention on Afghanistan. The reports contributed to the Soviet Union authorizing the Operation Storm-333, which led to the start of the Soviet–Afghan War.
