= Ivan Khokhlov =

Soviet politician (1895–1973)

- Иван Хохлов
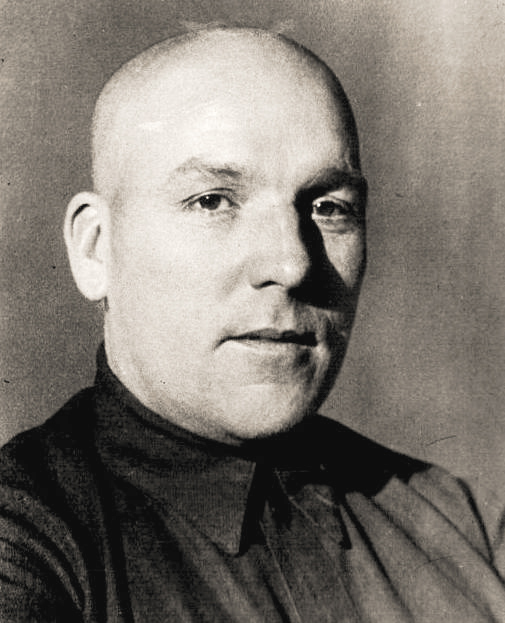
- Khokhlov in 1938

Chairman of the Council of People's Commissars of the Russian SFSR
- In office 2 June 1940 – 23 June 1943 (Note: Konstantin Pamfilov served as acting Chairman from 5 May 1942 until 2 May 1943.)
- President: Alexei Badayev
- Preceded by: Vasily Vakhrushev
- Succeeded by: Alexei Kosygin

Personal details
- Born: 28 May 1895 Gubino, Bronnitsky Uyezd, Moscow Governorate, Russian Empire
- Died: 11 February 1973 (aged 77) Moscow, Russian SFSR, Soviet Union
- Resting place: Novodevichy Cemetery
- Party: Communist Party of the Soviet Union
- Awards: Order of the Red Banner

Ivan Sergeyevich Khokhlov (Russian: Иван Серге́евич Хохлов; 28 May 1895 – 11 February 1973) was a Soviet-Russian statesman who was from 1940 to 1943 the Chairman of the Council of People's Commissars of the Russian SFSR, literally meaning Premier or Prime Minister.

From 1906 Khokhlov worked as a weaver. Entering the Red Army in 1918, he was an employee of the Rabkrin in 1920–23. To 1929 Khokhlov was a member of executive committees of Bronnitsky Uyezd and then Bogorodsky Uyezd. In 1931–34 in the financial department of Moscow Oblast, 1934–37 — chairman of the Ramensky District executive committee.

Khokhlov was elected member of the 1st, 2nd, 3rd and 4th Supreme Soviet of the USSR (1937–58), from 17 January 1938 to 31 May 1938 he was deputy chairman of the Presidium. From 2 June 1940 to 23 June 1943, he was the chairman of the Council of People's Commissars of the RSFSR. Due to the prolonged absence of Khokhlov, from 5 May 1942 his deputy Konstantin Pamfilov was the acting chairman of the Council of People's Commissars. Khokhlov's absence in Moscow was caused by his membership in the Military Council of Western Front. The main concern of Khokhlov at this time was the transportation of troops, the army's provision with military equipment, weapons, ammunition, fuel, evacuation from the western and southwestern regions, and repair of military equipment.

From 1955 Khokhlov was the head of the Main Directorate for Trade Inspection of the Ministry of Trade of the USSR. Ivan Khokhlov died in Moscow on 11 February 1973 and was buried at Novodevichy Cemetery.
