= Mikhail Rodionov =

Russian politician (1907–1950)

- Михаил Родионов
- Rodionov in 1939

Chairman of the Council of Ministers of the Russian SFSR
- In office 23 March 1946 – 9 March 1949
- President: Nikolai Shvernik; Ivan Vlasov
- Preceded by: Alexei Kosygin (Note: As Chairman of the Council of People's Commissars)
- Succeeded by: Boris Chernousov

Personal details
- Born: 25 October 1907 Ratunino, Makaryev Uyezd, Nizhny Novgorod Governorate, Russian Empire
- Died: 1 October 1950 (aged 42) Leningrad, Russian SFSR, Soviet Union
- Resting place: Levashovo Memorial Cemetery
- Party: All-Union Communist Party (Bolsheviks) (1929–1949)

Mikhail Ivanovich Rodionov (Russian: Михаил Иванович Родионов; 25 October [O.S. 12 October] 1907 – 1 October 1950) was a Soviet-Russian statesman who, from 1946 to 1949, was the Chairman of the Council of Ministers of the Russian SFSR. He was purged during the Leningrad affair.

He created a proposal for a new state flag of the RSFSR, but it was rejected. It consisted of a traditional Russian tricolour flag with a hammer and sickle in the middle. Together with Nikolai Voznesensky, he was sentenced to death in 1950 based on accusations of embezzlement from the Soviet State budget for "unapproved business in Leningrad", which was labeled anti-Soviet treason, at the Leningrad Affair case. He was a close companion of Alexei Kosygin.
