= Alexei Badayev =

Soviet politician (1883–1951)

- Алексей Бадаев
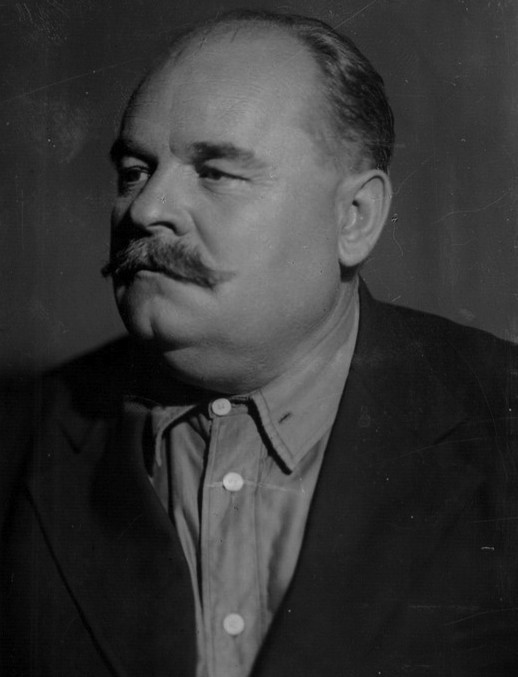
- Badaev in 1938

Chairman of the Presidium of the Supreme Soviet of the Russian SFSR
- In office 19 July 1938 – 4 March 1944 (Note: Ivan Vlasov served as acting Chairman since 9 April 1943.)
- Premier: Nikolai Bulganin; Vasily Vakhrushev; Ivan Khokhlov; Alexei Kosygin
- Preceded by: Office established Mikhail Kalinin as Chairman of the Central Executive Committee of the All-Russian Congress of Soviets
- Succeeded by: Nikolai Shvernik

People's Commissar for Food Industry of the RSFSR
- In office 12 August 1937 – 19 July 1938
- Preceded by: Semyon Lobov
- Succeeded by: Pavel Smirnov

Personal details
- Born: 16 November [O.S. 4 November] 1883 Karachevsky Uyezd, Oryol Governorate, Russian Empire
- Died: 3 November 1951 (aged 67) Moscow, Russian SFSR, Soviet Union
- Party: RSDLP (Bolsheviks) (1904–1918); VKP(b) (1918–1951)
- Profession: Civil servant

Alexei Yegorovich Badayev (Russian: Алексе́й Его́рович Бада́ев; 16 November [O.S. 4 November] 1883 – 3 November 1951) was a Soviet politician, functionary and a nominal head of state of the Russian Soviet Federative Socialist Republic during the leadership of Joseph Stalin.

== Biography ==
Badayev was born at Yuryevo in the Oryol Governorate of the Russian Empire in 1883 in a peasant family. He moved to Petersburg in 1903, joined the Alexander Factory as a locksmith, then worked on the railway. He joined the Bolshevik faction of the Russian Social Democratic Labour Party in 1904, and was an active member of the Metal Workers' Union from its inception in 1906.

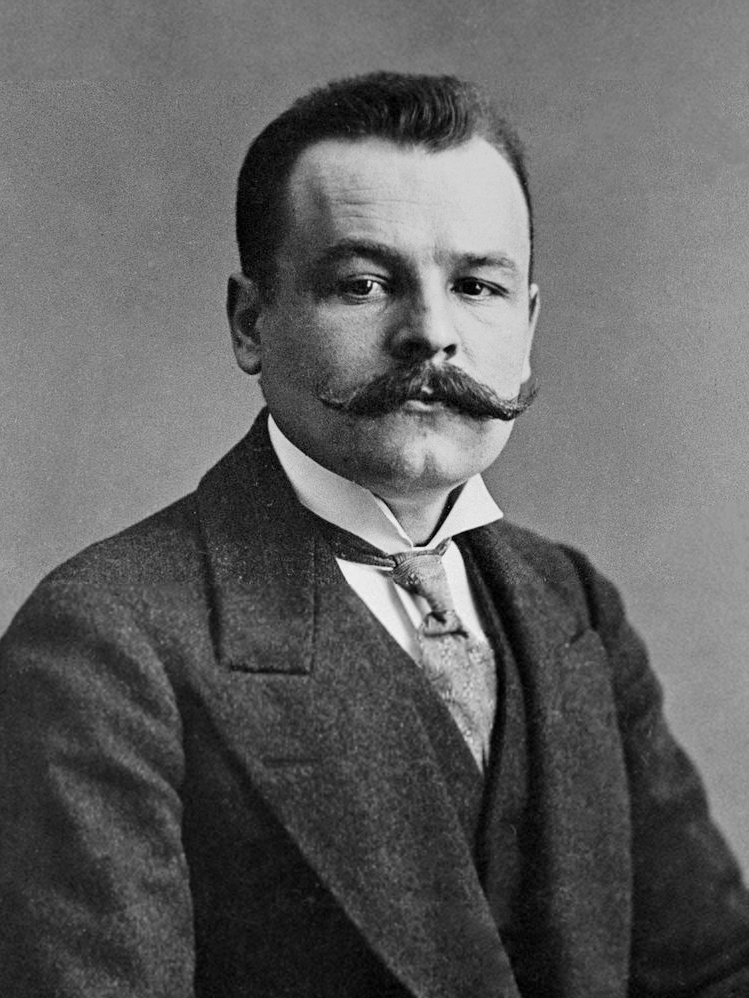
Badayev in 1912

From 1912 to 1914 he was a Deputy of the Fourth State Duma. In 1912–13, he also worked on the Bolshevik newspaper Pravda. In 1914, along with the other members of the Bolshevik group in the Fourth Duma (apart from the double agent Roman Malinovsky), and was deported the following year to Turukhansk. He later wrote reminiscences of this period which were translated into English as The Bolsheviks in the Tsarist Duma.

Badayev returned to Petrograd after the February Revolution in 1917 and became actively involved in the city duma, and in the management of food distribution. After the Bolshevik Revolution he was appointed chairman of the Food Commissariat for the North West region of Russia.

In September 1919 Petrograd consumer commune (shortly Petrocommune) was established by Decree of the Sovnarkom "On consumer communities" dated 16 March 1919. It was the germ of the cooperative sector during the "war communism". Badayev was the founding chairman of the Petrocommune governance.

In the first half of the 1920s he worked as Deputy Chairman of the Petrograd (later the city was renamed Leningrad) gubispolkom (ispolkom of gubernija). He was a member of the Central Committee of the All-Union Communist Party from 1925 to 1951. He was Chairman of the USSR Central Consumers' Union (Tsentrosoyuz), 1930–38. From August 1937 to July 1938 he was the People's Commissar of Food Industry of the RSFSR, and from 19 July 1938 to 4 March 1944 he was the Chairman of the Presidium of the Supreme Soviet of the Russian SFSR. He died in Moscow in 1951 and was buried at the Novodevichy Cemetery.

== See also ==
- Badayev warehouses

== Notes ==
Political offices
Preceded by Mikhail Kalinin as Chairman of ARCEC	Chairman of the Presidium of the Supreme Soviet of the Russian SFSR; 1938–1944	Succeeded by Nikolai Shvernik
