= Mikhail Tarasov (politician) =

Soviet politician (1899–1970)

- Михаил Тарасов
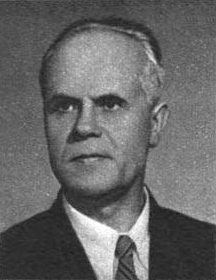
- Tarasov in 1950

Chairman of the Presidium of the Supreme Soviet of the Russian SFSR
- In office 7 July 1950 – 16 April 1959
- Premier: Boris Chernousov; Alexander Puzanov; Mikhail Yasnov; Frol Kozlov; Dmitry Polyansky
- Preceded by: Ivan Vlasov
- Succeeded by: Nikolai Ignatov

Personal details
- Born: Mikhail Petrovich Tarasov; 1899 Kamenka, Russian Empire (now Zelenograd, Moscow, Russia)
- Died: 1970 (aged 70–71) Moscow, Russian SFSR, Soviet Union
- Party: CPSU (1925–1973)

Military service
- Allegiance: Russian SFSR
- Branch/service: Red Army
- Years of service: 1918–?
- Battles/wars: Russian Civil War

Mikhail Petrovich Tarasov (Russian: Михаил Петрович Тарасов; 1899 – 1970) was a Soviet politician.

== Biography ==
He "Followed in his father's footsteps", from the age of 12, began his career on the Nikolayevskaya railway, in 1911. He volunteered for military service of the Red Army, since 1918. Member of the Communist Party since 1924.

In 1925–1944, he worked in trade union and party work. Since the beginning of the Great Patriotic War, he led the evacuation of the population and enterprises of the Ukrainian SSR to the rear of the Union. Between 1944 and 1950 he was a member of the Presidium and Secretary of the All-Union Central Council of Trade Unions. At the same time since 1945, a member of the General Council and executive committee of the World Federation of Trade Unions. In 1945, he attended the World Trade Union Conference in London alongside many renowned trade unionists.

From June 1947 to March 1951 — Chairman of the Supreme Soviet of the RSFSR.

From July 1950 to April 1959 — Chairman of the Presidium of the Supreme Soviet of the RSFSR, Deputy Chairman of the Presidium of the Supreme Soviet of the USSR.

In 1959–1970 — Adviser to the Council of Ministers of the RSFSR.

In 1952–1956 — member of the Central Auditing Commission. In 1956–1961 — candidate for membership in the Central Committee of the CPSU.

In 1950–1962 — Deputy of the Supreme Soviet of the USSR.

== Writings ==
- The concern of the Party and the Government about the rise of the material well-being and cultural level of workers [Text] / M. Tarasov. — Moscow: ed. and 1st type. Profizdata, 1950, printing house "Red Proletarian".

== Literature ==
- Resolution of the 1st session of the Supreme Soviet of the RSFSR of the II convocation, June 20–26, 1947, verbatim report. M., 1947.
- Resolution of the 1st session of the Supreme Soviet of the RSFSR of the III convocation on April 13 — 17, 1951, verbatim report. M., 1951.
- Resolution of the 4th session of the Supreme Soviet of the RSFSR of the II convocation of July 4–7, 1950, verbatim report. M., 1950.
- Ogonyok magazine No. 26 (1203) dated June 25, 1950.
- The Great Soviet Encyclopedia. 2nd edition. Vol. 41. M., 1956.
- Resolution of the I-th session of the Supreme Soviet of the RSFSR of the V convocation on April 15 — 16, 1959, verbatim report. M., 1959.
