= Bloc of Communists and Non-Partisans =

Bloc of Communists and Non-Partisans Блок коммунистов и беспартийных
- Abbreviation: BKb
- First leader: Joseph Stalin
- Last leader: Mikhail Gorbachev
- Founded: 6 December 1937
- Dissolved: 1991
- Mother Party: Communist Party of the Soviet Union
- Ideology: Communism; Marxism–Leninism; Stalinism (until 1956)
- Political position: Far-left

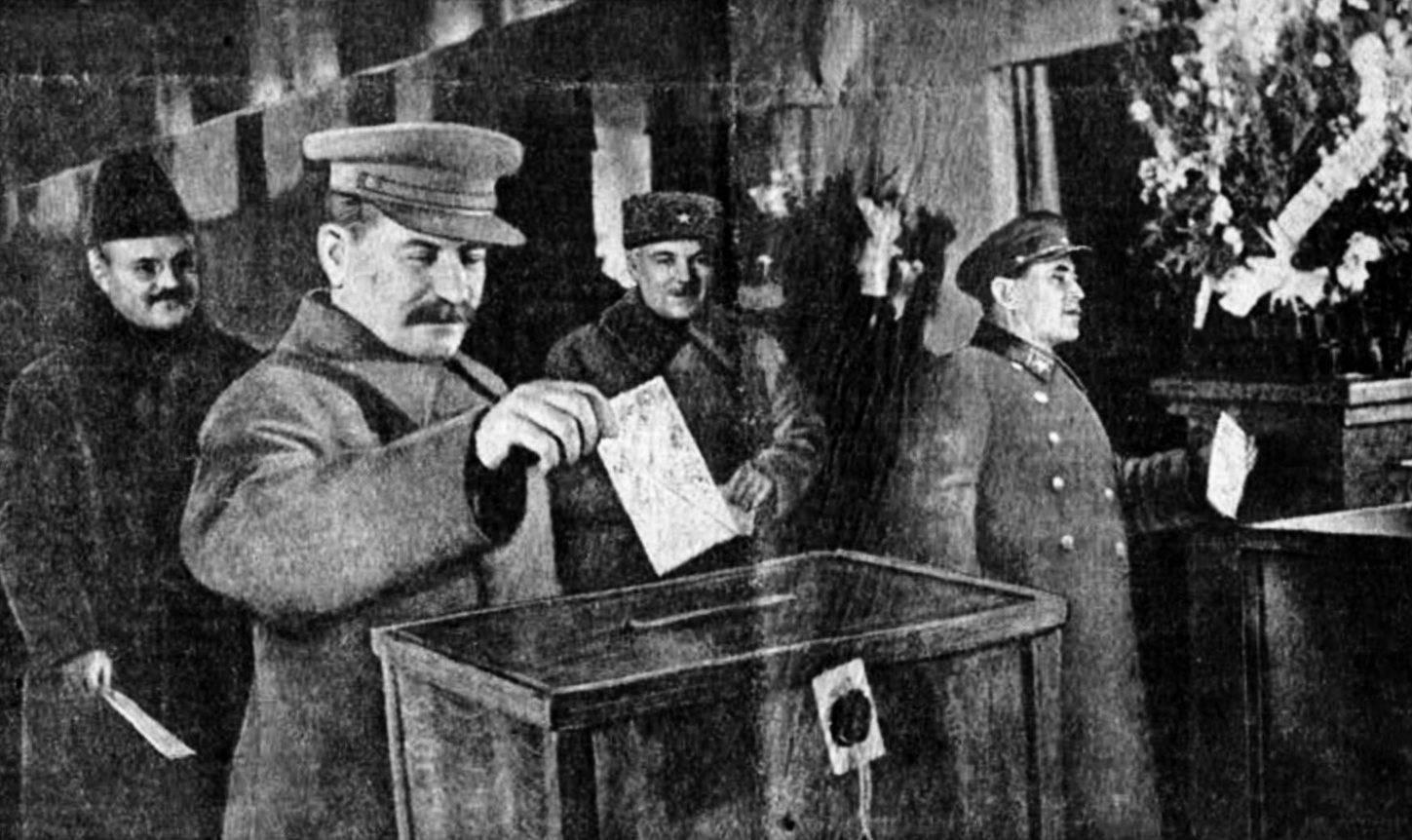

The Bloc of Communists and Non-Partisans (Russian: Блок коммунистов и беспартийных, romanized: Blok kommunistov i bespartiynykh) was a political alliance in the Soviet Union of the Communist Party with non-partisans, which nominated its candidates on a non-alternative basis in all elections to the Soviets from 1937 until 1984. The alliance's last election was also the Soviet Union's last national election, in 1989. The alliance dissolved along with the Communist Party and Soviet Union in late 1991.

== History ==
The bloc was founded on 7 December 1937, when the newspaper Pravda announced the establishment of a political association of communists and non-party members before the 1937 Soviet Union legislative election, which was created with the aim of creating a semblance of unity between the party and the people after the defeat of the opposition and political figures disloyal to Stalin. According to Ilya Zemtsov, one of the bloc's goals was to create the appearance that political repressions were carried out in the interests of the people and led to the establishment of people's democracy, although non-party members were carefully selected and approved by party organizations.

The emergence of such an alliance was due to the fact that the Communist Party, in order to create the illusion of alternative or democratic elections, had no one to form an alliance with, as other political forces were banned, and the Komsomol, which had previously been nominated in the elections, was an openly subordinate force, lacking even the semblance of autonomy. Because of this, they were deemed unsuitable for an alliance, so the Communist Party could only create the appearance of democracy by forming an alliance with ephemeral non-partisan forces, which, although a priori lacking unity or their own structures, can create a semblance of democratic procedures.
