= Presidium of the Supreme Soviet of the Russian Soviet Federative Socialist Republic =

Collective head of state of the Russian SFSR

The Presidium of the Supreme Soviet of the Russian Soviet Federative Socialist Republic was the collective head of state of the Russian SFSR and the permanent body of the Supreme Soviet of the Russian SFSR that was accountable to the Supreme Soviet of the Russian SFSR in its activity and, within the nominal limits prescribed by the Constitution of the Russian SFSR, performed functions of the highest state power in the Russian SFSR between 1938 and 1990. It was elected by the Supreme Soviet of Russia to perform the Supreme Soviet's activities when it was not in session, which, in practice, was most of the year.

== History ==
=== Predecessor offices ===
The office was created as a replacement for the Central Executive Committee of the All-Russian Congress of Soviets.

=== Political significance ===
Since the Russian SFSR enjoyed only limited autonomy within the Soviet Union until late into the perestroika period and since real executive power was in the hands of the Soviet Communist Party until 1990, the Supreme Soviet and its Presidium were mostly ceremonial. However, they became important in early 1990 when a newly elected Russian Congress of People's Deputies was split between Communist loyalists and their opponents. After days of parliamentary maneuvering, Boris Yeltsin was elected Chairman in May 1990. Soon thereafter, he resigned from the Communist Party and started building an independent power base within the Russian SFSR, which proved to be an important step on the way to the Soviet collapse in late 1991.

== Officeholders ==
- Aleksei Badayev (1938–1944)
- Nikolai Shvernik (1944–1946)
- Ivan Vlasov (1946–1950)
- Mikhail Tarasov (1950–1959)
- Nikolai Ignatov (1959)
- Nikolai Organov (1959–1962)
- Nikolai Ignatov (1962–1966)
- Mikhail Yasnov (1966–1985)
- Vladimir Orlov (1985–1988)
- Vitaly Vorotnikov (1988–1990)

Note: In 1989 the position of Chairman of the Presidium of the Supreme Soviet was abolished. Instead the Chairman of the Supreme Soviet became head of the republic in addition to serving as a parliamentary speaker. Boris Yeltsin was chairman 1990–1991. In early 1991, the post of President of Russia was created and executive powers were transferred from the Supreme Soviet to the President. The responsibilities of the Supreme Soviet Chairman were limited to those of a parliamentary speaker. Boris Yeltsin won the first presidential election in June 1991 and, upon inauguration, resigned from the office of the Supreme Soviet Chairman. He was succeeded by:

- Boris Yeltsin (May 29, 1990 – July 10, 1991)
- Ruslan Khasbulatov (October 29, 1991 – October 4, 1993), acting Chairman from July 10, 1991

== Successor offices ==
After the dissolution of the Soviet Union on December 25, 1991, the Russian Supreme Soviet became the acting parliament of the Russian Federation with Khasbulatov as Chairman. It was dissolved during the Russian constitutional crisis of 1993. Supreme Soviet was succeeded by:

- Federal Assembly of Russia (1993 – present)

== See also ==
- All-Russian Central Executive Committee
