= Ukrainian apostrophe =

The apostrophe in the Ukrainian language is used before the letters я, ю, є, ї, when they denote the combination of the consonant /j/ with the vowels /ɑ/, /u/, /ɛ/, /i/ after б, п, в, м, ф, р and any solid consonant ending in a prefix or the first part of a compound word.

== General rules ==
The apostrophe is placed before я, ю, є, ї:

1. After the letters denoting the labial solid consonant sounds б, п, в, м, ф, if they are not preceded by another consonant (except р), which would belong to the root: б’ю, п’ять, п’є, в’я́зи, солов’ї́, м’я́со, рум’я́ний, (на) ті́м’ї, жира́ф’ячий, мереф’я́нський; П’я́ста, В’ячесла́в, Дем’ян, Максим’ю́к, Стеф’ю́к. If the consonant in front of the labial belongs to the prefix, then the apostrophe is also placed: зв’язо́к, зв’яли́ти, підв’яза́ти, обм'я́клий, розм’я́кнути, сп’яні́ти.
2. After a solid р at the end of the composition: бур’я́н, міжгі́р’я, пі́р’я, ма́тір’ю, кур’є́р, (на) подві́р’ї; Валер’я́н, Мар’я́н, Мар’я́на.
3. After к in the word Лук’я́н and its derivatives: Лук’я́ненко, Лук’яню́к, Лук’яне́ць.
4. After prefixes and the first part of compound words ending in a solid consonant: без’я́дерний, без’язи́кий, від’ї́зд, з’є́днаний, з’ї́хати, з’яви́тися, напів’європе́йський, об’є́м, під’ї́хати, під’ю́дити, роз’ю́шити, пан’європе́йський; дит’я́сла, камер’ю́нкер, Мін’ю́ст.

=== The apostrophe is not placed: ===
1. We do not write an apostrophe when there is another letter (except p) in front of the letter to denote the lip sound, which belongs to the root (base): дзвя́кнути, духмя́ний, ма́впячий, медвя́ний, морквя́ний, різдвя́ний, свя́то, тьмя́ний, цвях; but: арф’я́р, ве́рб’я, торф’яни́й, черв’я́к.
2. We do not write an apostrophe when ря, рю, рє mean a combination of soft р with the following а, у, е: буря́к, бу́ряний, гаря́чий, кря́кати, крюк, рю́мсати, поряту́нок, ряби́й, рясни́й.
3. After prefixes with a final consonant before the following і, е, а, о, у, we do not write the apostrophe: безіме́нний, зініціюва́ти, зеконо́мити, загітува́ти, зорієнтува́ти, зумі́ти.
- We write an apostrophe in words of foreign origin and derivatives before я, ю, є, ї, which denote the combination of the sound /j/ with the following vowel:
1. After consonants б, п, в, м, ф, г, к, х, ж, ч, ш, р: б’єф, комп’ю́тер, п’єдеста́л, інтерв’ю́, прем’є́р, кар’є́ра; П’ємо́нт, П’яче́нца, Рив’є́ра, Ак’я́б, Іх’я́мас, Ях’я́; Барб’є́, Б’ю́кенен, Донаг’ю, Женев’є́ва, Ф’є́золе, Монтеск’є́, Руж’є́, Фур’є;
2. After the final consonant in the prefixes: ад'ютант, кон'юнктивіт, кон'юнктура, ін'єкція, диз’ю́нкція.
- The apostrophe is not spelled:
1. In front of the digraph йo: курйо́з, серйо́зний;
2. When я, ю denote the softening of the previous consonant before a, y: бязь, бюдже́т, бюро́, кюве́т, пюпі́тр, резюмé, мюри́д, фюзеля́ж, рюкза́к, рюш, Барбю́с, Бюффо́н, Вю́ртембергґ, Мю́ллер, Гюґо́, Рюдберґ.

== Apostrophe in surnames ==
The apostrophe is written after the labial, velar and р before я, ю, є, ї: Аляб'єв, Ареф'єв, Водоп'янов, В'яльцева, Григор'єв, Захар'їн, Луб'янцев, Лук'янов, Пом'яловський, Прокоф'єв, Юр'єв; before йо the apostrophe is not written: Воробйов, Соловйов.

Note. When я, ю mean the combination of a softened consonant a, y, the apostrophe before them is not written: Бядуля, Пясецький, Рюмін.

The abbreviated particle "d" and the Irish particle "o" are written with proper names through an apostrophe: Д'Аламбер, Д'Артаньян, Д'Обіньє; О'Генрі, О'Кейсі, О'Коннейль.

== Apostrophe in geographical names ==
The apostrophe is written in geographical names after labial (м, п, б, ф, в), velar (г, ґ, к, х) and р, as well as after prefixes ending in a consonant, before я, ю, є, ї: В'язники, Скóп’є, Прокоп'євськ, П'ятигорськ, Ак'яр, Амудар'я, Гур'єв; before йо the apostrophe is not written: Муравйово.

Note. When я, ю mean the combination of a softened consonant with /ɑ/ and /u/, the apostrophe before them is not written: Вязьма, Кяхта, Крюково, Рязань.

== See also ==
- Rules for using the soft sign in the Ukrainian language
- Rule of nine in the Ukrainian language
- Rules for the transmission of sounds /i/, /ɪ/, /j/ in proper names of foreign origin in the Ukrainian language

== Sources ==
- Ukrainian orthography of 2019
- Apostrophe // Ukrainian orthography. — К.: Scientific thought, 2012. — P. 9, P. 123.
- Handbook of Ukrainian language — Orthography
