= White House (Moscow) =

Government building in Moscow

House of the Government of the Russian Federation
- Дом Правительства Российской Федерации
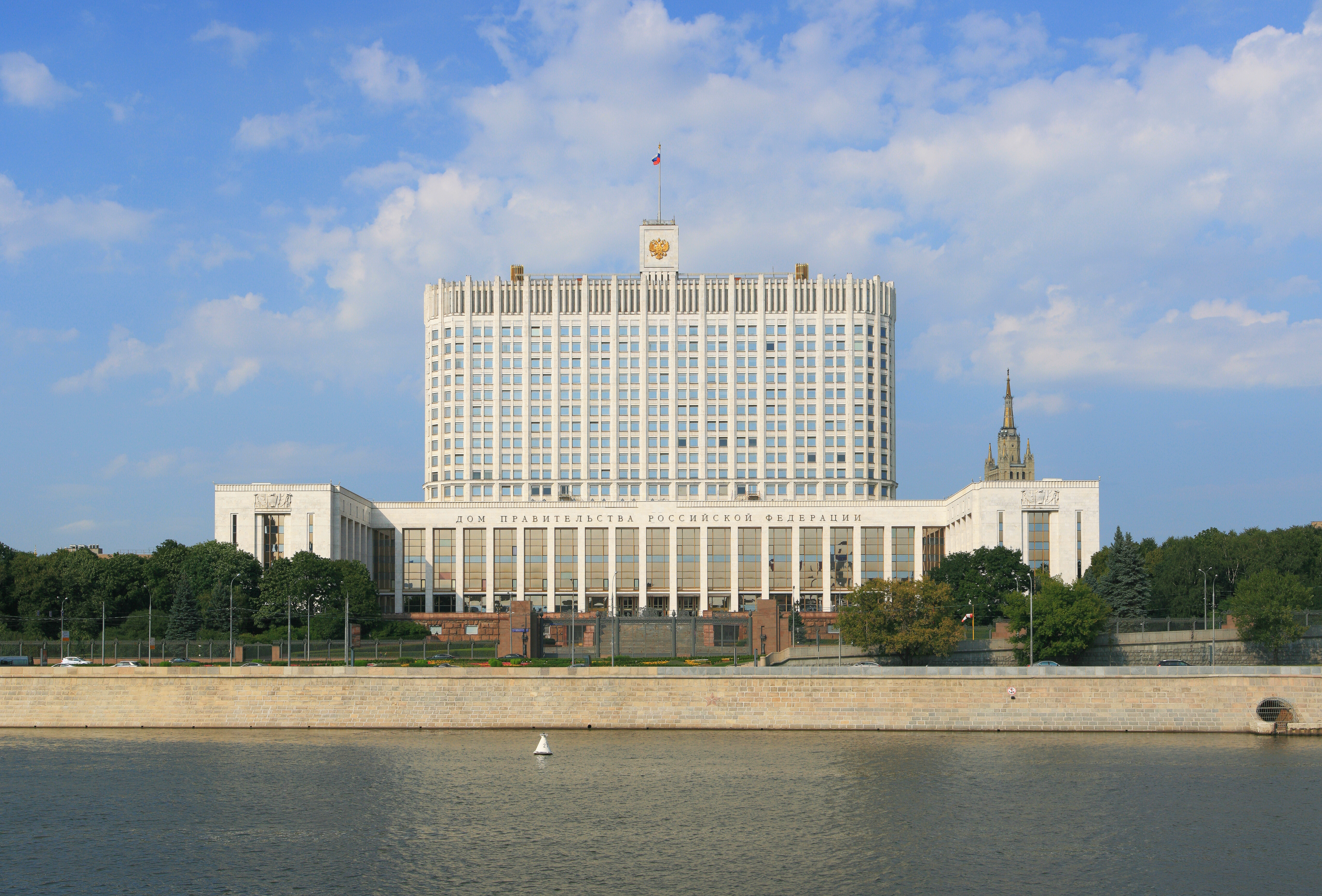
- The building in 2016

- Location within Moscow
- Former names: House of Soviets of Russia

General information
- Type: Parliament
- Architectural style: Soviet modernism
- Location: Moscow, Russia
- Coordinates: 55.7549°N 37.5731°E
- Construction started: 1965; 61 years ago
- Completed: 1981; 45 years ago

Height
- Height: 119 m (390 ft)

Design and construction
- Architects: Dmitry Chechulin, Pavel Shteller

The White House (Russian: Белый дом, romanized: Belyy dom, IPA: [ˈbʲɛlɨj ˈdom]), officially the House of the Government of the Russian Federation (Russian: Дом Правительства Российской Федерации, romanized: Dom pravitelstva Rossiyskoi Federatsii), also known as the Russian White House and previously as the House of Soviets of Russia, is a government building in Moscow. It stands on the Krasnopresnenskaya Embankment. The building serves as the primary office of the government of Russia and is the official workplace of the prime minister.

It was built from 1965 to 1981 according to the design of architect Dmitry Chechulin to house the People's Control Committee and the Supreme Soviet of Russia. During the failed August 1991 coup attempt, the building became a center of resistance to the State Committee on the State of Emergency. The structure was badly damaged during the 1993 constitutional crisis and was subsequently repaired.

== History ==
=== Construction and use in the Soviet Union ===
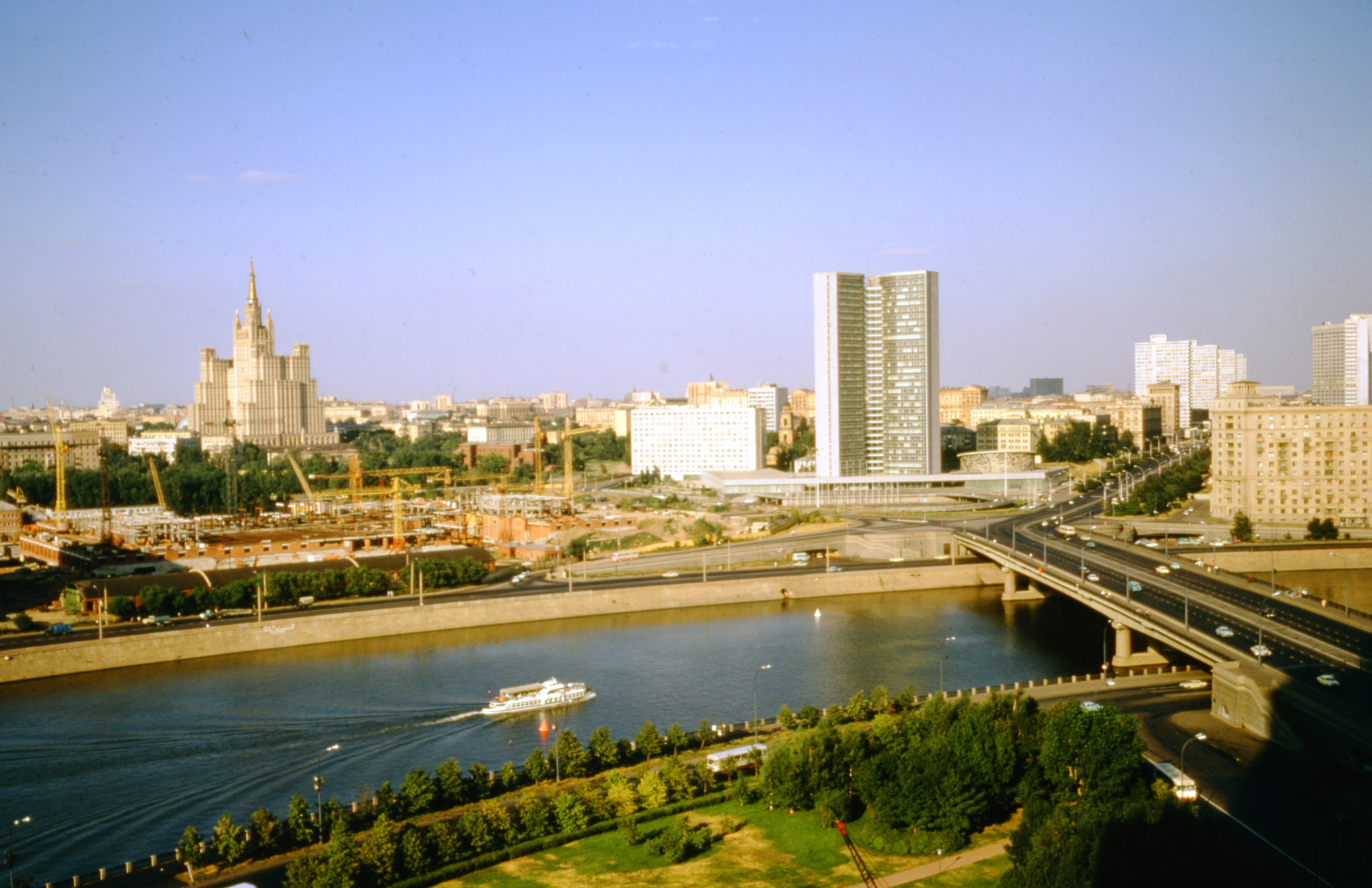
View of Moscow (1972) showing the construction site of the complex

In 1965, construction of the House of Soviets began to accommodate the administrative bodies of the Russian Soviet Federative Socialist Republic (RSFSR) at this site. The plan for the reconstruction of the territory was prepared by a group of architects known as Mosproekt-1, led by Dmitry Chechulin, Pavel Shteller, Vladimir Lukyanov, and others, alongside a team of engineers. The overall design follows Chechulin's 1934 draft of the Aeroflot building. Initially, Chechulin proposed constructing the building on Taganka Square, which rises above a significant part of the city, as the site on the Krasnopresnenskaya embankment was inconvenient due to nearby buildings; however, because of the good view alongside the high bank of the Moskva River, the current location was chosen instead.

The House of Soviets was the first multi-storey building in which a uniformly shaped prefabricated reinforced concrete frame with monolithic stiffness cores was used. Outside, the structure was lined with individual claydite concrete panels, which were previously finished with marble. The total area of the complex was 732,000 square meters, with a total area of office space around 132,000 square meters. The building was designed with a complex three-level system of underground floors, where parking, bunkers, ventilation chambers and refrigeration equipment were located. The structure was equipped with a separate sewerage and an autonomous power supply system. There is a theory that the building is connected by underground passages to subway tunnels, but official sources do not confirm or refute this information. According to the memoirs of one of the builders, Felix Mikhailovich Ashurov, when installing the flagpole, Dmitry Chechulin ordered it to be shortened by three meters for a more harmonious combination of proportions; however, due to possible delays, workers were ordered to install the already prepared bar in secret from the architect over a weekend.

Construction was completed in 1981, with a total cost exceeding 94 million rubles. After the completion of the project, team leader Dmitry Chechulin, architect Vitaly Mazurin, and designer Yuri Dykhovichny were awarded the Lenin Prize. From 1981 to 1993, the Supreme Soviet of Russia, which had until then held its sessions in the Grand Kremlin Palace, used the White House. The Supreme Soviet of Russia remained in the building until the end of the Soviet Union in 1991, as well as during the first years of the Russian Federation. In 1991 the Soviet Union issued a 50-kopeck stamp depicting the White House and honoring resistance to the 1991 Soviet coup attempt.

=== Role in 1991 coup d'état attempt ===
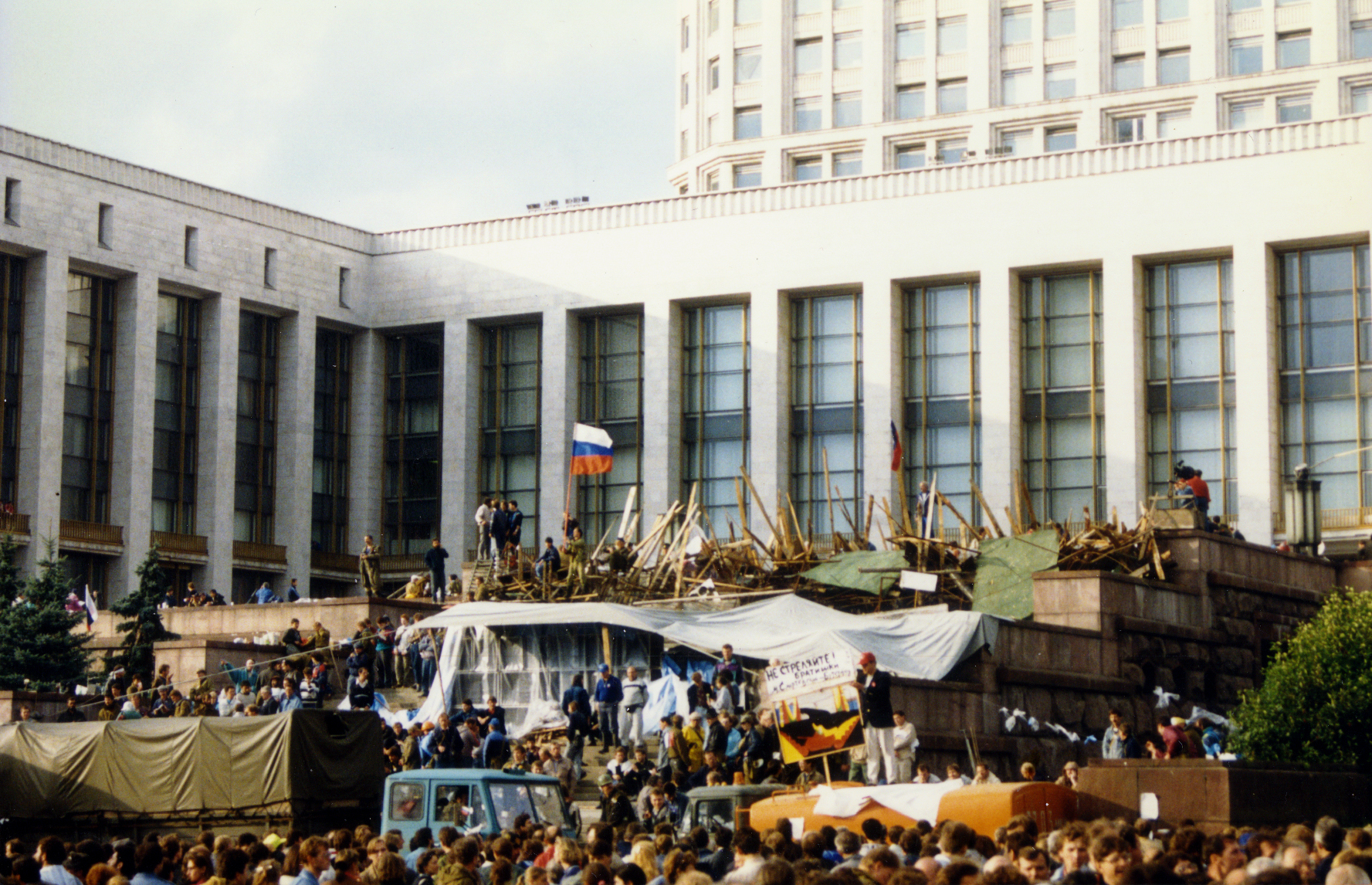
Rally at the walls of the House of Soviets during the 1991 coup attempt

In August 1991, the House of Soviets became the center of a confrontation against the State Committee on the State of Emergency. The opposition was headed by Russian president Boris Yeltsin, in support of whom large-scale rallies were held around the building. During this period, Yeltsin repeatedly spoke to the audience, with his most famous speech being delivered on August 19 from a tank of the Taman Division. At that time, the building was surrounded by a living chain of Muscovites who supported the president. An improvised barricade was built around the building, using materials such as garbage cans, fences of nearby parks, benches, and sawn trees. Protestors also painted graffiti of political topics on the walls of the building. By August 20, approximately two hundred thousand people had gathered around the structure including public and political figures Ruslan Khasbulatov, Ivan Silayev, Alexander Rutskoy, Eduard Shevardnadze, Mikhail Khodorkovsky, Mstislav Rostropovich, Andrey Makarevich, and others.

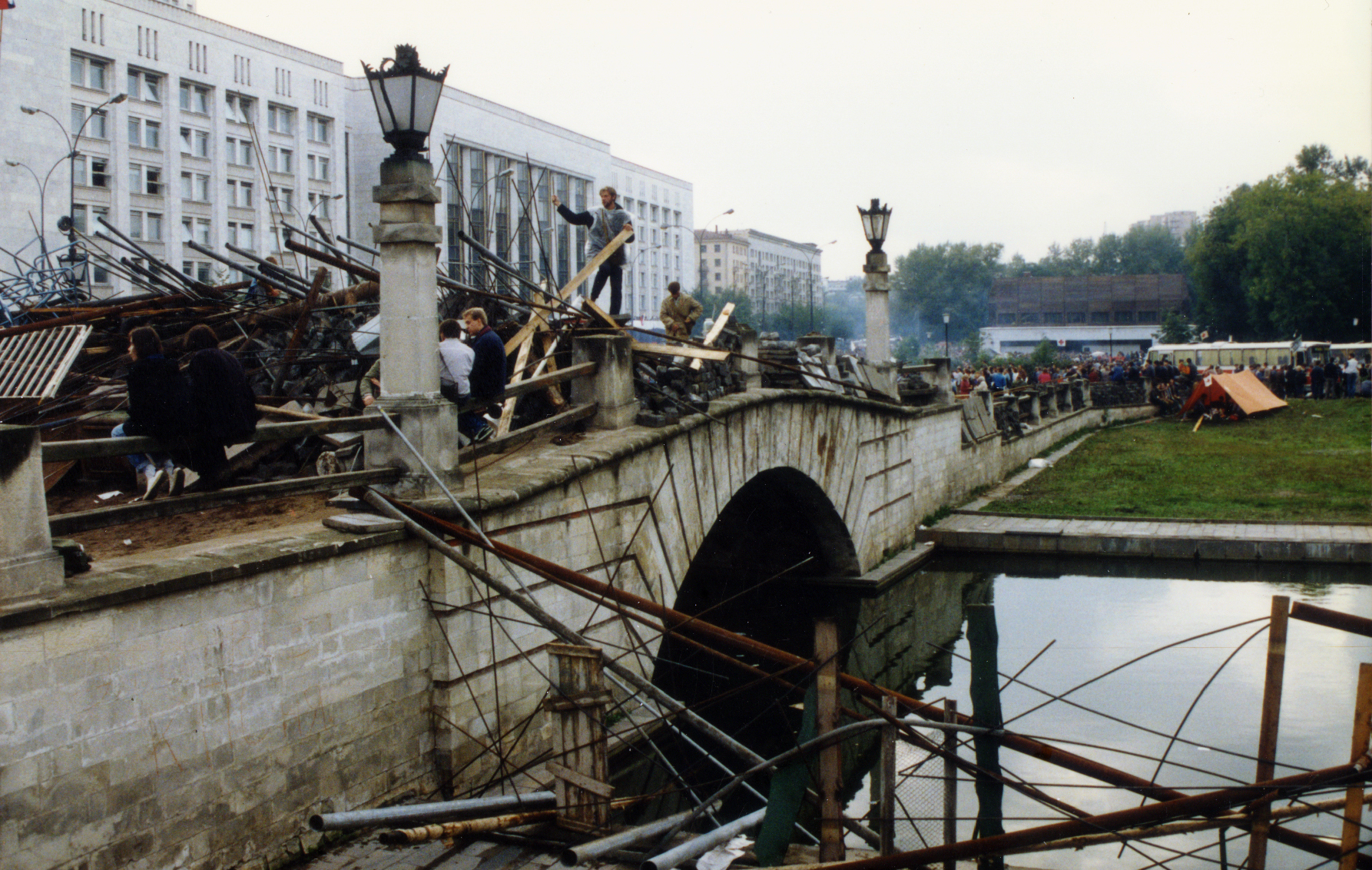
Makeshift barricade near the walls of the House of Soviets during 1991 coup attempt

The building was not stormed, presumably due to the possible number of civilian and military casualties. Later, the events that took place near the walls of the House of Soviets and elsewhere in the Soviet Union were defined as the August Coup. It was during this period that the name "White House" was assigned to the building, which was widely used by the state media. In 1992, the building was depicted on the back side of commemorative coins in honor of the "victory of democratic forces" and the anniversary of Russia's state sovereignty.

=== Forceful dispersal of the Supreme Soviet of Russia ===
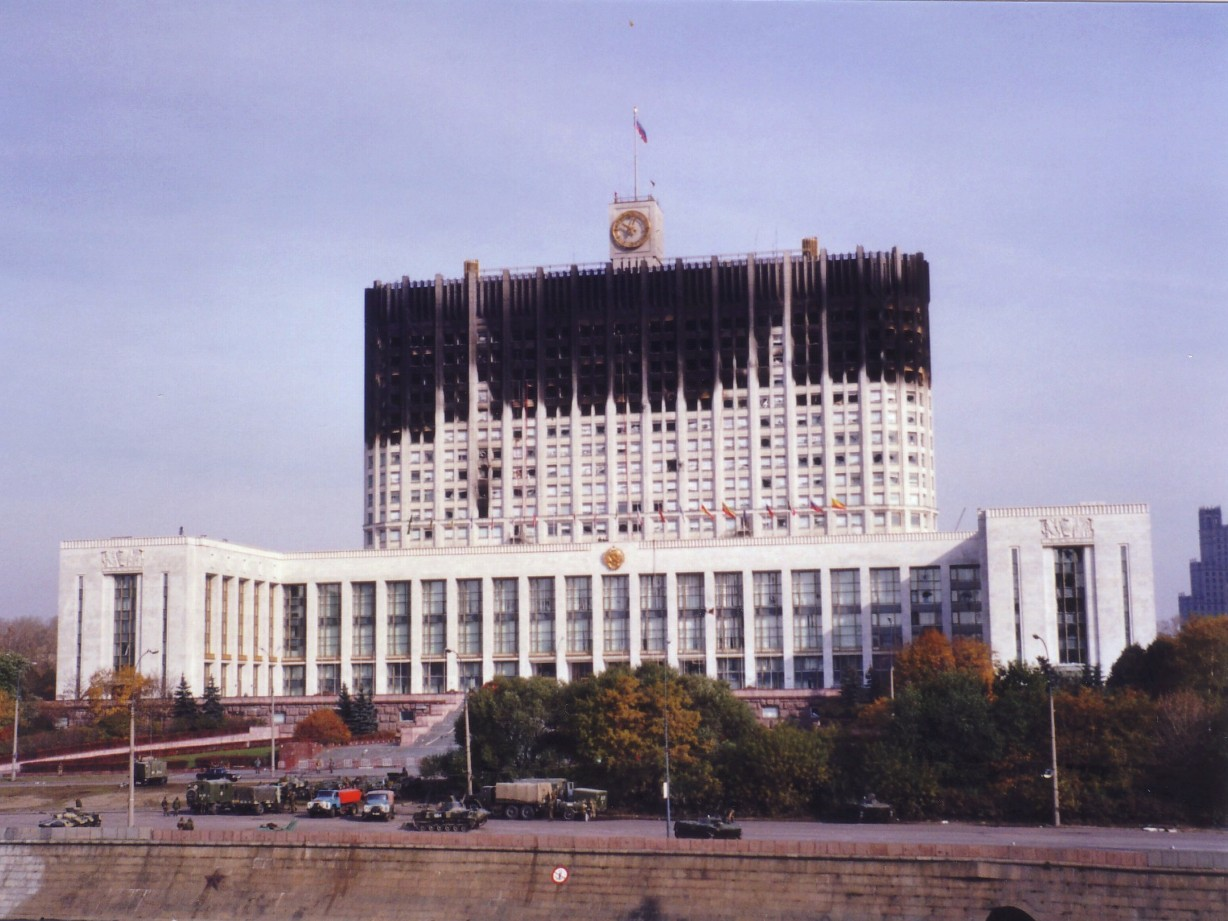
The White House in 1993, soon after it was shelled by tanks

In the midst of the constitutional crisis of 1993, Boris Yeltsin issued Decree No. 1400 to dissolve the Congress of People's Deputies and the Supreme Soviet of Russia. The House of Soviets was disconnected from television and radio. According to the conclusion of the Constitutional Court, the president's actions were illegal and contradicted the Russian Constitution of 1978. An emergency session of the Supreme Soviet was convened, during which, among other things, it was decided to protect the building from possible siege. The events caused a spontaneous rally near the walls of the building. Protective detachments from security, civilians, Cossack volunteer formations and retired military personnel were organized at the House of Soviets. Data on weapons stored in the building vary. From September 23 to October 4, 1993, the Tenth Session of the Congress of People's Deputies of the Russian Federation was held in the building, as the conference hall of the Grand Kremlin Palace was closed for repair. The Congress and the Supreme Soviet stated the termination of the powers of President Boris Yeltsin and their transfer to Vice President Alexander Rutskoy.

During this period, rallies were held in different parts of Moscow, which caused armed skirmishes, and the territory around the building was recognized as a particularly dangerous zone. At a meeting of the General Staff of the Armed Forces of the Russian Federation, it was decided to storm the House of Soviets, after which President Boris Yeltsin signed a decree on attracting troops from the Ministry of Defense to Moscow. During the seizure of the building, six tanks from the Taman Division that were placed on the Novoarbatsky Bridge fired 12 shells at the upper floors of the building. Arkady Baskaev, who was appointed commandant of the House of Soviets after the assault, said that the fire in the building of the Supreme Soviet arose as a result of shelling from tanks. Subsequently, Alexander Rutskoy described the incident as follows:

"The first shell hit the meeting room, the second in Khasbulatov's office, the third in mine. And they were beaten with high-explosive shells, not insacks, as they claim today. The building will not burn from the dummy. I was sitting in my office when the projectile broke the window and exploded in the right corner [of the room]. Fortunately, my table was on my left. A stunned man came out of there. I don't know what saved me."

Because of the shelling, a fire began on the 12th and 13th floors of the White House. The fire covered the entire upper part and destroyed 30% of the total area of the building, later the damage was estimated at 170 billion rubles. The situation in the White House after the assault was described by a correspondent of the Kommersant newspaper:

"By order of the White House Commandant Major General Arkady Baskaev, there is enhanced security from assault rifles and special forces of the Ministry of Internal Affairs on each floor. Such caution is by no means unnecessary, since armed supporters of parliament are still in the basements of the Armed Forces building. [...] In the first minutes after the assault, as soon as the shots subsided and special forces soldiers went to inspect the upper floors of the White House, streams of marauders rushed into the halls. [...] The inside [of] the parliament building is completely looted. Everything you can have [has] been carried away: TVs, phones, table lamps and even plumbing."

Ruslan Khasbulatov, referring to eyewitness letters in Nezavisimaya Gazeta, states that there were about 1,500 victims in total, whose bodies were taken out of the building in secret passages.

=== End of the 20th century and the present ===
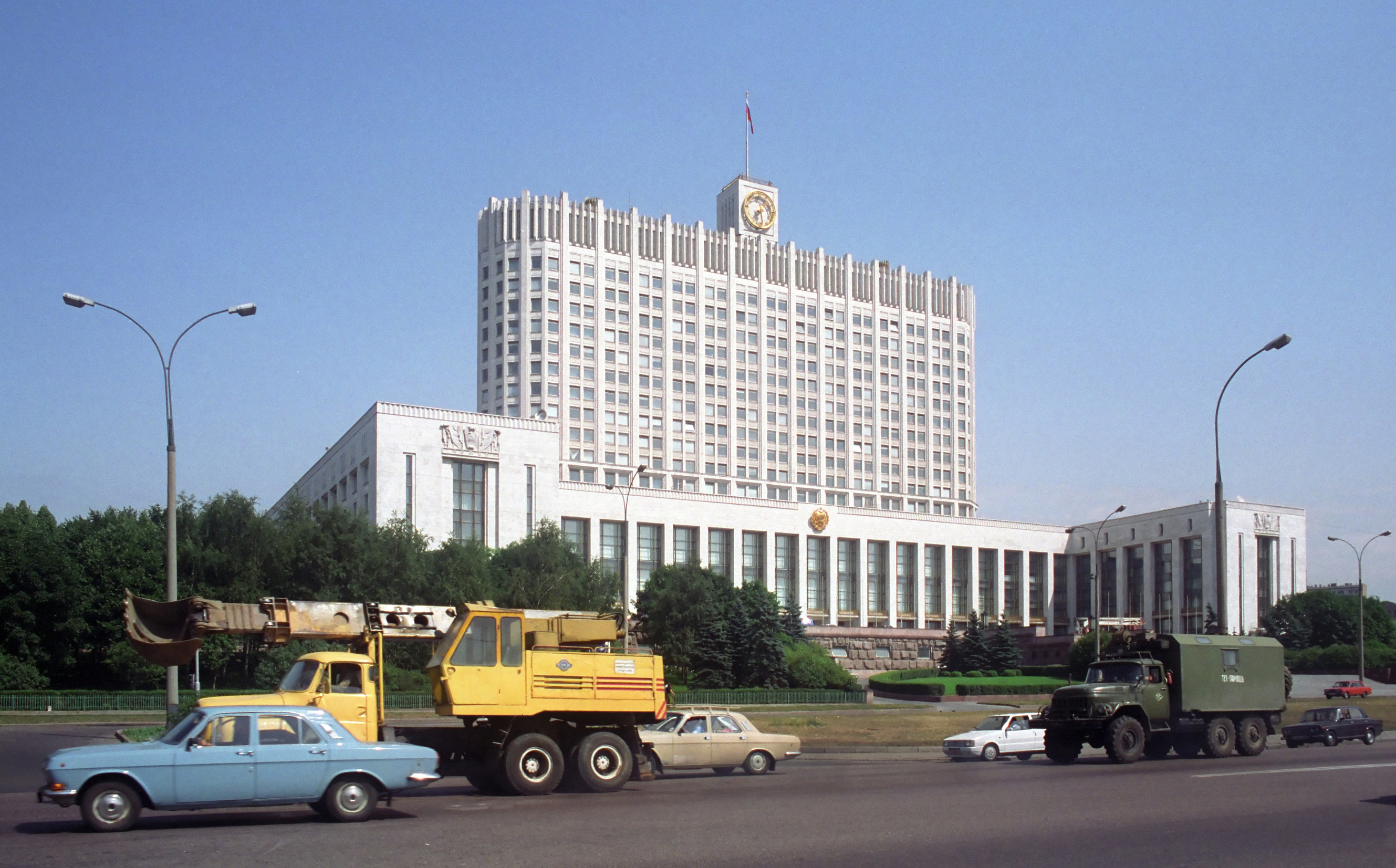
Facade of the building (1992)

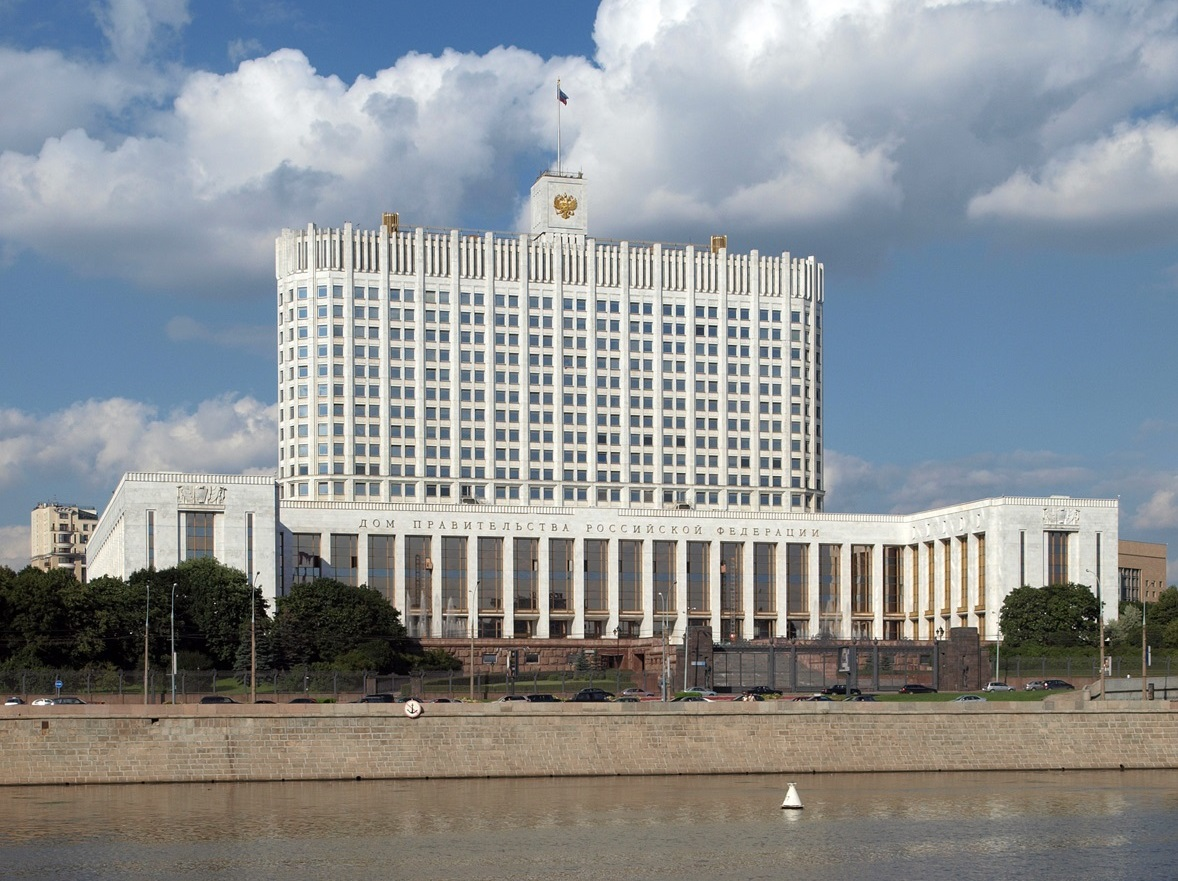
Facade of the building after reconstruction (2008)

Following the events of the 1993 constitutional crisis, control of the building was transferred via a decree by Boris Yeltsin to the Government of the Russian Federation (the executive branch), under whose control the reconstruction of the building took place. The reformed parliament, known thereafter by its Imperial-era title of the State Duma, was elected in December 1993 and moved to another building on Moscow's Okhotny Ryad.

American architect Charles Jencks suggested that restorers mark the burnt floors on the facade with black granite cladding; however, this idea was abandoned in favor of recreating the original appearance of the complex. According to some data, repairs on the upper floors of the building were carried out by Turkish workers. During the restoration work, the clock on the tower of the main facade of the building was restored and reused; however, by the second half of 1994, the clock was dismantled and a golden image of a double-headed eagle – the coat of arms of Russia – had been installed in its place. During this, the building was fenced off from the embankment with a massive fence that prevented rallies at the walls of the building. Nevertheless, protesters continued to gather next to the White House on the Humpback Bridge. In 1996, on the territory of the nearby Presnensky Park, a chapel was opened in memory of those who died in the House of Soviets.

Restoration work was carried out for almost a year, and in 1994 the repaired complex was occupied by the Government of the Russian Federation. An inscription at the base of the tower reads "House of the Government of the Russian Federation," the official name of the building. There is an office for the president of Russia located on the third floor of the building. Traditionally, at the end of each year, the president holds meetings with the Council of Ministers in the White House, but ordinary meetings are rarely held in the building. In 2008, there was a large-scale reconstruction of the fifth floor of the building. At the same time, some media outlets reported on the construction of a swimming pool and gym within the building, but official sources did not confirm this information. A year later, a private restaurant was opened on the twelfth floor of the complex. In 2012, plans were made to move the offices of the officials to a new federal center in Kommunarka, but this idea was postponed indefinitely. The following year, a helipad was installed near the building.

In September 2020, the press service of the Government of the Russian Federation reported that the condition of White House was recognized as an emergency, citing issues with the roof and leaks in the basement among other issues. The Russian government has planned to allocate more than 5 billion rubles for reconstruction purposes.

== Architecture ==
The White House in 2014

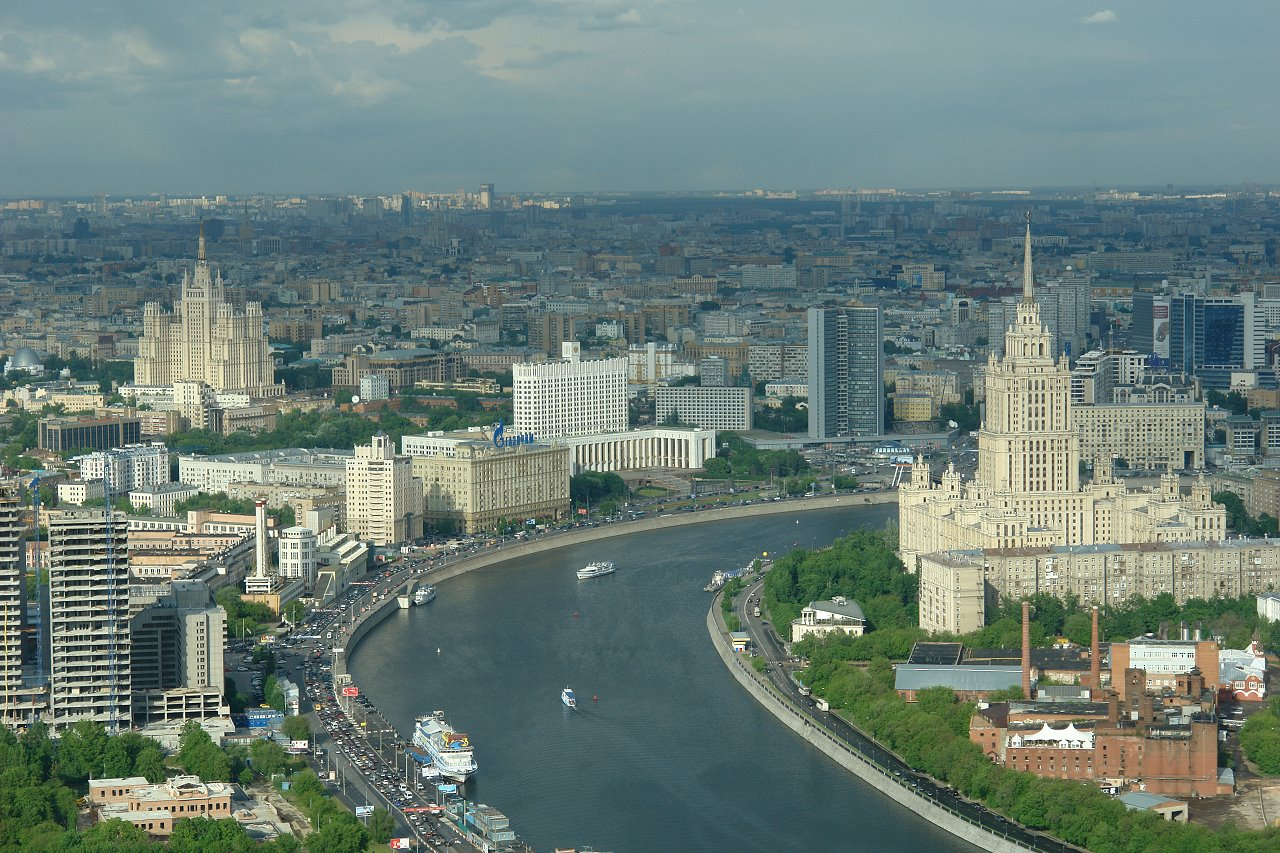
Panorama of Krasnopresnenskaya embankment, with the White House in the center (2008)

During the construction of the White House, Dmitry Chechulin used elements of his unrealized 1934 design for the headquarters of state airline Aeroflot. The original idea for the Aeroflot building was developed in honor of the rescue, by Soviet pilots, of the passengers of the sunken steamship SS Chelyuskin. The construction was supposed to have simplified forms; the stylobate of the building was similar in size to the ship, it was supplemented with numerous sculptural compositions. The main entrance of the planned building emphasized the portico, which resembled a triumphal arch. It was assumed that the Aeroflot building would form a new look for the Belorussky railway station square; but the structure did not correspond to the site in size and configuration, so it was never built.

In 1965, Dmitry Chechulin used his plans for the unrealized project of the Aeroflot building to develop the plans for the future House of Soviets. However, the monumental complex of the White House differed from the original idea of the architect. The simplified composition of the building had a symmetrical pyramidal structure composed of three parts. The powerful base with divergent ramps and a front staircase is supported by a wide seven-storey building with side wings. Above them stands a twenty-storey tower with rounded edges. The strict rhythm of the windows is disturbed on the upper technical floor, where the openings are much narrower. The outer walls of the structure are lined with granite and white marble. The building is crowned by a small tower with a gilded Russian coat of arms and a flagpole on which the national flag is fixed. The height of the structure with the flagpole is 119 meters; without it, 102 meters. The building was the last lifetime project of Dmitry Chechulin and is a unique object of Moscow's development, forming a panorama of the embankment.

The premises of the complex are decorated with multicolored stone marble inserts. The main assembly hall is located in the central part of the seven-storey base and faces the Moscow River. In total, the building has 27 meeting and reception rooms.
