= Lukyanov =

Lukyanov (Russian: Лукьянов; sometimes romanized as Loukianoff) is a Russian masculine surname, its feminine counterpart is Lukyanova. The surname is derived from the male given name Lukyan and literally means Lukyan's. It may refer to:

- Aleksandr Lukyanov (born 1949), Russian rower
- Anatoly Lukyanov (1930–2019), Russian and Soviet politician
- Dmitry Lukyanov (cyclist) (born 1993), Kazakhstani racing cyclist
- Dmitry Lukyanov (general), (1900–1985), Soviet general
- Ivan Lukyanov (disambiguation)
- Peter Loukianoff (1948–2024), American bishop
- Sergei Lukyanov (1910—1965), Soviet film and theater actor
- Valeria Lukyanova (born 1985), Ukrainian model and entertainer
- Vladimir Lukyanov (born 1945), Russian architect, painter and graphic artist
