= Vodopyanov =

Vodopyanov (Russian: Водопьянов), feminine: Vodopyanova (Russian: Водопьянова) is a Russian surname. Variants include: Vodopianov, Vodopianoff, Wodopjanow. (Cyrillic: Водопьянов, Вадопьянов, Водоп'янов). It is a patronymic surname derived from the nickname with the structure "noun+adjective", Водо- + -пьян-, 'water'+'drunk', an ironic reference to a drunkard.

Notable people with the surname Vodopyanov or Vodopyanova include:

- Konstantin Vodopyanov (born 1963), Russian physicist from Stanford University
- Mikhail Vodopyanov (1899–1980), Soviet pilot, Major General
- Natalia Vodopyanova (born 1981), Russian basketball player
- Sergey Vodopyanov (born 1987), Russian boxer
- Vitali Vodopyanov (born 1974), Russian footballer
- Pyotor Vodopyanov (1855-1912), Colonel in Russian Army
- Radik Vodopyanov, Kyrgyzstani footballer
- Tetyana Vodopyanova (born 1973), Ukrainian biathlete
- Veniamin Vodopyanov (1865-1943), Russian Cossack commander in the Russo-Japanese War
- Vitali Vodopyanov, Russian footballer
- Yulia Vodopyanova, Armenian rhythmic gymnast

== See also ==
- 4851 Vodopʹyanova, minor planet
