= Leningrad Hero City Obelisk =

Monument in Vosstaniya Square in Saint Petersburg, Russia

Coordinates: 59.931°N 30.362°E

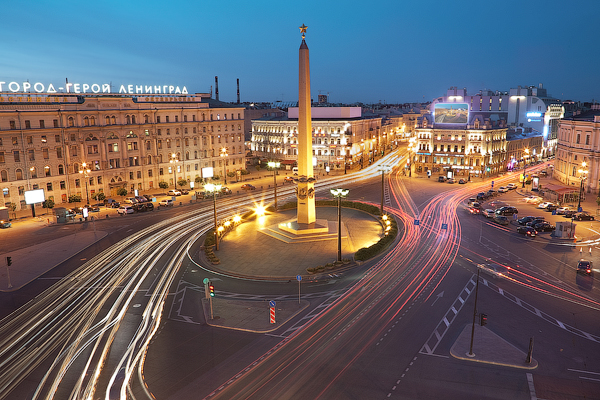
- The Hero City Obelisk is located in Vosstaniya Square in Saint Petersburg
- Interactive map of Leningrad Hero City Obelisk
- Location: Saint Petersburg, Russia
- Type: Sculpture
- Completion date: May 1985
- Dedicated to: Commemorates the fortieth anniversary of the Red Army's victory in the German-Soviet War

Leningrad Hero City Obelisk (Russian: Обелиск «Городу-герою Ленинграду») is a monument in the shape of an obelisk located in Vosstaniya Square in Saint Petersburg, Russia, which was known as Leningrad from 1924 to 1991. It was installed on Victory Day of May 1985 to commemorate the fortieth anniversary of the Red Army's victory in the German-Soviet War. The monument was designed by architects Vladimir Lukyanov and A. I. Alymov.

The Hero-City Obelisk is pentahedral in shape; its cross section has the shape of a star. In its lower part, the Obelisk is encircled with a bronze wreath covering the joint of the two monoliths. The monument is decorated with bronze high reliefs devoted to the heroic defence of Leningrad while a gold star shines on its top. After the Alexander Column, it is the highest stone monument in Saint Petersburg.

When Soviet forces eventually lifted the siege in January 1944, over one million inhabitants of Leningrad had died from starvation, exposure and German shelling. 300,000 soldiers had perished in the defence and relief of Leningrad. Leningrad was awarded the title Hero City in 1945, being the first city to receive that distinction.

Installing the obelisk required highly skilled builders and fitters. Grey granite resembling the colour of soldier's overcoat was chosen to make the body of the monument. The rock was obtained from a quarry of the Vozrozhdenie (literally: Revival) deposit near the town of Vyborg. On 6 November 1983, a monolith weighing 2200 tonnes was separated from the source rock with the help of a controlled explosion. The finishing touches and polishing of the granite were done on the site. In early April 1985, the Obelisk crowned with the "Gold Star" was installed onto its pedestal.

== Principal dimensions ==
The total height of the obelisk is 36 meters. It consists of a crowned top and a central trunk of height 22.5 meters, pommel and Star — 4.5 m. and base — 9 m. Its base has a diameter of 3.5 meters and a width of 9 meters. The overall mass of the monument is approximately 390 tonnes. The total mass of the monument with the base is 750 tonnes. The diameter bronze wreaths is 4.5 meters while that of the Gold Star at its top, which is made of stainless steel, is 1.8 meters.

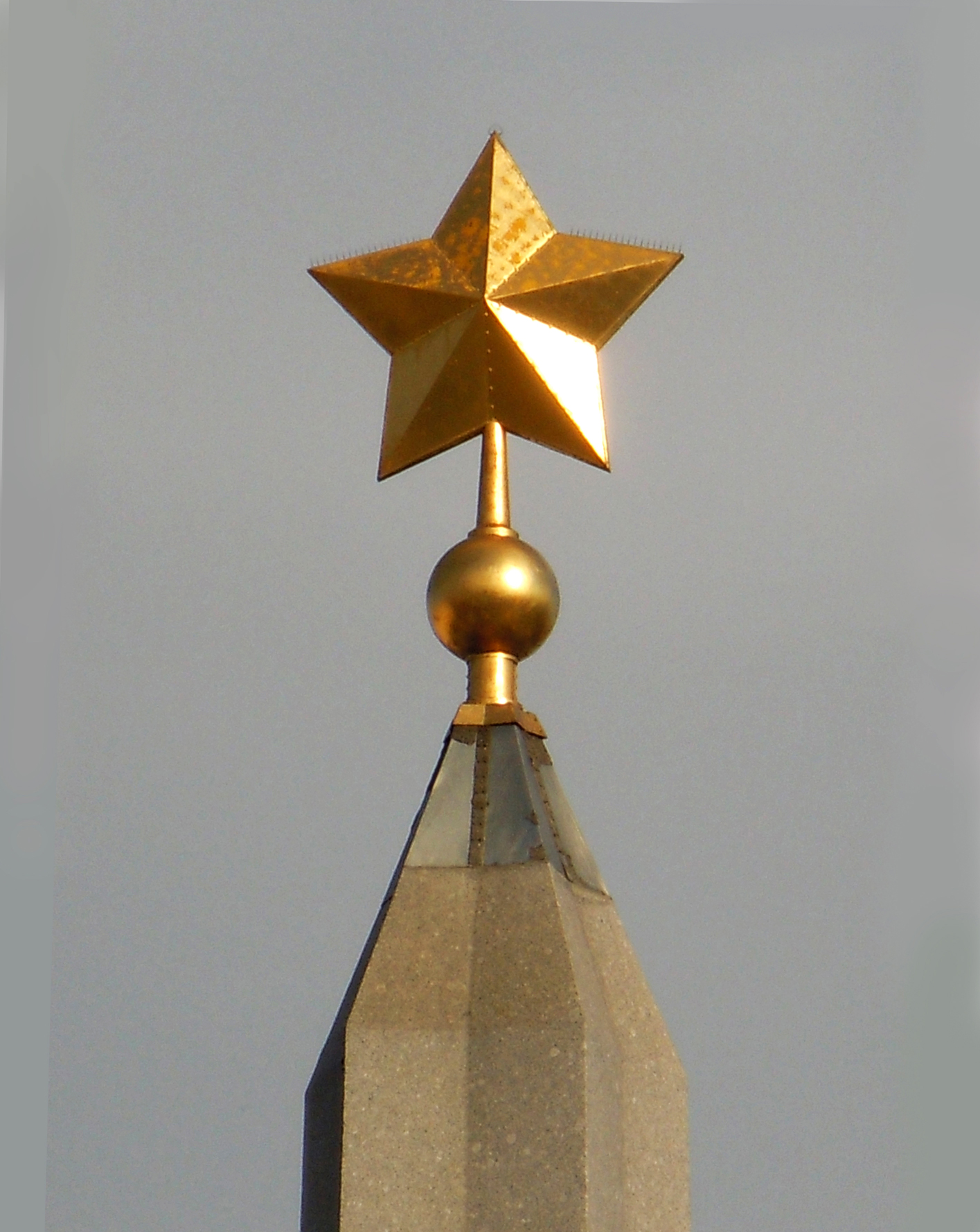
Pommel and «Gold Star» at the top height 4,5 meters

== Sources ==
- Bulakh A.G., Abakumova N.V., Romanovsky J.V. -St Petersburg: A History in Stone, -2010, -SPb, -SPb University Press, p.-174, ISBN 978-5-288-05020-6, p. 61-62.
- Исаченко В.Г. Памятники Санкт-Петербурга. Справочник. -СПб:"Паритет".2004.-400c.,ил.,стр.-298.ISBN 5-93437-188-6.
- Кириков Б.М.,Кирикова Л.А.,Петрова О.В. Невский проспект.Дом за домом. 2-е изд.,испр.-М.: Центрполиграф, 2006.стр.-371.ISBN 5-9524-2069-9.
- Лисовский В.Г. Санкт-Петербург.в 2т.Т.2,От классики к современности.-СПб.:Коло, 2009.584с.,стр.482.ISBN 978-5-901841-58-7.
- Лавров Л.П."1000адресов в Санкт-Петербурге.Краткий архитектурный путеводитель"-СПб.: "Эклектика", 2008.-416c.,стр.92..
