= Whitehead Bros. =

US musical duo

The Whitehead Bros. were an American R&B duo from Philadelphia, Pennsylvania, made up of two brothers, Kenny “Ken Spin” a.k.a. “Bermuda” Whitehead and elder brother, the late John "J-Step" Whitehead Jr., who contributed hits such as "Your Love is a 187" “Sex On The Beach” from their 1994 Motown release, Serious. Their second single from the Serious LP, entitled "Forget I Was a G", also appeared in the Jason’s Lyric Soundtrack in addition to being synced in the film numerous times. Their music is still popular today and celebrated on a great scale internationally. They are sons of the late John Whitehead who penned multiple hits for The Gamble and Huff ‘Philly Sound’, as well as performing and co-writing with his partner Gene McFadden, the well known smash "Ain’t No Stoppin’ Us Now".

Kenny Whitehead remains active in the music business today as a singer/songwriter and producer.

== Discography ==
=== Albums ===
Year	Title	Chart positions	
Year	Title	US R&B	US Heat
1986	Kenny & Johnny - The Whitehead Brothers: Released: 1986; Label: Philadelphia International Records		

Year	Title	Chart positions	
Year	Title	US R&B	US Heat
1994	Serious: Released: August 23, 1994; Label: Motown Records	37	13

=== Singles ===
Year	Title	Chart positions	
Year	Title	US R&B	UK Singles Chart
1986	"I Jumped Out My Skin": Label: Philadelphia International Records	79	
1986	"Stylin & Profilin": Label: Philadelphia International Records	79	
1994	"Your Love is A 187": Label: Motown Records	15	32
1995	"Forget I Was a G": Label: Motown Records	32	40
