= Buffon =

Buffon may refer to:

== People ==
- Georges-Louis Leclerc, Comte de Buffon (1707–1788), French naturalist
- Marguerite Françoise de Buffon (1767–1808), mistress of Louis Philippe II, Duke of Orléans
- Alfharezzi Buffon (born 2006), Indonesian footballer
- Gianluigi Buffon (born 1978), Italian football goalkeeper
- Guendalina Buffon (born 1973), Italian retired volleyball player
- Lorenzo Buffon (1929–2025), Italian football goalkeeper, related to Gianluigi Buffon
- Louis Buffon (born 2007), Italian-Czech footballer, son of Gianluigi Buffon

== Places ==
- Buffon, Côte-d'Or, France, a town
- Cape Buffon, a headland in South Australia
- Buffon Islands, Adélie Land, Antarctica
- Buffon (crater), a lunar crater

== Other uses ==
- Lycée Buffon, a secondary school in Paris

== See also ==
- Buffin, nickname of Dale Griffin (1948–2016), English drummer and a founding member of 1970s rock band Mott the Hoople
- Bouffant
- Buffoon
