= Serious =

Serious may refer to:

- Seriousness, an attitude of gravity, solemnity, persistence, or earnestness

== Television ==
- Serious (TV series), a BBC children's programme
- "Serious" (Not Going Out), a 2006 episode

== Albums ==
- Serious (Luther Allison album) or the title song, 1987
- Serious (Whitehead Bros. album) or the title song, 1994

== Songs ==
- "Serious" (Duran Duran song), 1990
- "Serious" (Gwen Stefani song), 2004
- "Serious", by Alice Cooper from From the Inside, 1978
- "Serious", by Donna Allen, 1986
- "Serious", by Duffy from Rockferry, 2008
- "Serious", by E-40 from Revenue Retrievin': Graveyard Shift, 2011
- "Serious", by Five from Invincible, 1999
- "Serious", by Jasmine V, 2010
- "Serious", by Jme
- "Serious", by Scars on Broadway from Scars on Broadway, 2008

== See also ==
- Sirius (disambiguation)
