= Rudberg =

Rudberg is a surname. Notable people with the surname include:

- Agam Rudberg (born 1986), Israeli actress and model
- Denise Rudberg (born 1971), Swedish writer
- Gunnar Rudberg (1880–1954), Swedish classical philologist
- Omar Rudberg, contemporary Swedish musician
- Per Rudberg (1922–2010), Swedish Navy vice admiral
- Rune Rudberg (born 1961), Norwegian singer
- Sten Rudberg (1917–1996), Swedish geographer, son of Gunnar Rudberg
