= Lukyanenko =

Lukyanenko, often spelled Lukianenko, is a Ukrainian-language surname. It is a patronymic surname derived from the given name Lukian.

Language	Name
Belarusian (Romanization)	Лук'яненка (Lukjanienka, Lukyanienka)
Russian (Romanization)	Лукьяненко (Lukyanenko, Lukianenko, Lukjanenko)
Ukrainian (Romanization)	Лук'яненко (Lukyanenko, Lukianenko, Lukjanenko)

Notable people with the surname include:

- Artem Lukyanenko (born 1990), Russian decathlete
- Daria Lukianenko, (born 2002), Russian Paralympic swimmer
- Iryna Lukianenko, (born 1983), Ukrainian figure skating coach and former competitor
- Larisa Lukyanenko (born 1973), Belarusian individual rhythmic gymnast
- Levko Lukianenko (1928–2018), Ukrainian politician and Soviet dissident
- Sergei Lukyanenko (born 1968), Russian science fiction and fantasy author
- Vitaliy Lukyanenko (born 1978), Ukrainian biathlete
- Yevgeniy Lukyanenko (born 1985), Russian pole vaulter
