= Pavel Shteller =

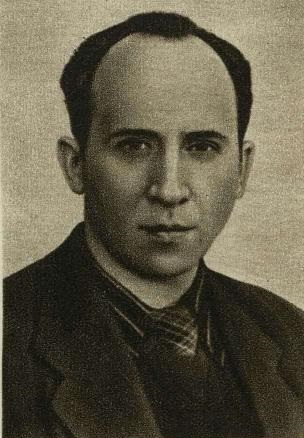
Image of Shteller

Pavel Pavlovich Shteller (14 January [O.S. 1 January] 1910 - 4 February 1977) was a Soviet architect, urban planner, and teacher. In the 1930s, he was a noted swimmer and water polo player.

He was made an Honored Architect of the RSFSR (1971 and made Laureate of the Lenin (1962) and Stalin Prizes of the third degree (1951).
