= Vitali Vodopyanov =

Russian footballer

Personal information
- Full name: Vitali Yuryevich Vodopyanov
- Date of birth: 12 September 1974 (age 52)
- Place of birth: Tolyatti, Russian SFSR
- Height: 1.82 m (5 ft 11 1/2 in)
- Position: Goalkeeper

Senior career*
Years	Team	Apps	(Gls)
1992	FC Lada Togliatti	3	(0)
1993–1994	FC Devon Oktyabrsky	28	(0)
1995	FC Agidel Ufa	12	(0)
1996–2002	FC Sodovik Sterlitamak	128	(0)
2003	FC Sibiryak Bratsk	24	(0)
2004	FC Lokomotiv Chita	13	(0)
2005	FC Neftyanik Ufa	20	(0)
2006	FC Zenit Chelyabinsk	12	(0)
2008	FC Taksist Ufa (D4)		
2009–2010	FC Bashinformsvyaz-Dynamo Ufa	42	(0)
- * Club domestic league appearances and goals

Vitali Yuryevich Vodopyanov (Russian: Виталий Юрьевич Водопьянов; born 12 September 1974) is a former Russian professional football player.

== Club career ==
He made his Russian Football National League debut for FC Lada Togliatti on 27 June 1992 in a game against FC Rubin-TAN Kazan.
