= Konstantin Vodopyanov =

Konstantin Lvovich Vodopyanov (Russian: Константин Львович Водопьянов; born 8 January 1953) is a Russian physicist from Stanford University. He was awarded the status of Fellow in the American Physical Society, after they were nominated by their Division of Laser Science in 2009, for "development of a new class of broadly-tunable infrared and terahertz sources based on nonlinear-optical conversion in bulk, micro- and nano- structured media, and their application to spectroscopic studies including demonstration of electromagnetically-induced transparency in quantum wells."

== See also ==
- List of fellows of the American Physical Society (1998–2010)
