= Vyaltsev =

Vyaltsev or Vialtsev (Russian: Вяльцев) is a Russian masculine surname, its feminine counterpart is Vyaltseva or Vialtseva. It may refer to

- Anastasia Vyaltseva (1871–1913), Russian mezzo-soprano singer
- Egor Vyaltsev (born 1985), Russian basketball player
