= Vosstaniya Square =

Square in Saint Petersburg, Russia

Coordinates: 59.931°N 30.362°E

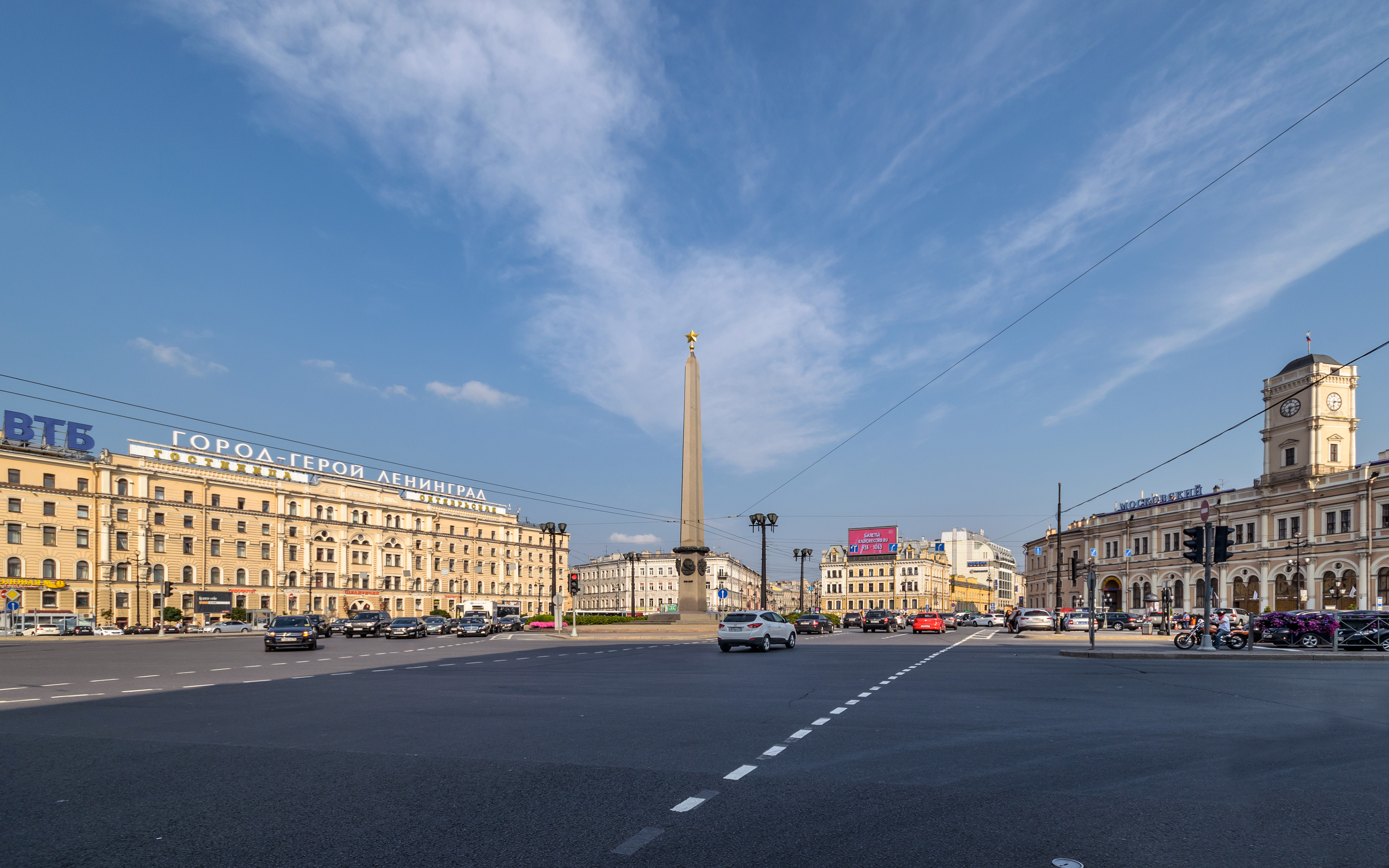
Vosstaniya Square in 2014

Vosstaniya Square (Russian: Плóщадь Восстáния, romanized: Plóshchad' Vosstániya, IPA: [ˈploɕːɪtʲ vɐsːˈtanʲɪjə], lit. 'Uprising Square'), before 1918 Znamenskaya Square (Russian: Знаме́нская пло́щадь, lit. 'Square of the Sign'), is a major square in the Central Business District of Saint Petersburg, Russia. The square lies at the crossing of Nevsky Prospekt, Ligovsky Prospekt, Vosstaniya Street and Goncharnaya Street, in front of the Moskovsky Rail Terminal, which is the northern terminus of the line connecting the city with Moscow. Administratively, the Vosstaniya Square falls under the authority of the Tsentralny District.

== History ==
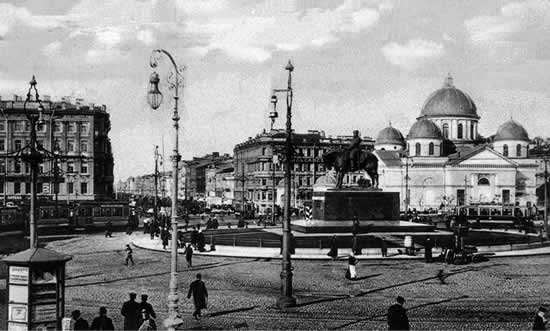
Znamenskaya Square before the revolution

From the 1840s to 1918, the square was known as Znamenskaya Square, after the Cathedral of the Sign built there between 1794 and 1804 in a Neoclassical design by Fedor Demertsov. The church building commemorated the icon of Our Lady of the Sign.

Four years before the Romanov Tercentenary, in 1909, Prince Paolo Troubetzkoy, an artist and sculptor, completed a tremendous equestrian statue of Tsar Alexander III. It stood opposite Nikolayevsky Station in Znamenskaya Square. The statue was removed by the Soviet regime in 1937. It remained in storage for fifty years before its re-erection in 1994 in front of the Marble Palace.

The square was a scene of many revolutionary demonstrations and protests. After the Bolsheviks took control of Petrograd in 1917, they had the square renamed (1918) into Uprising Square to commemorate these events. The Church of the Sign was demolished by the Soviet government in 1940 to make room for the surface vestibule of the Ploshchad Vosstaniya (Vosstaniya Square) Metro station, which opened in 1955.

The Leningrad Hero-City Obelisk was erected on the spot of the former Alexander III monument in 1985 in commemoration of the 40th anniversary of Russian Victory Day. The obelisk received mixed reviews, as its design and style did not match that of the neo-classic square.

In 2010, the 200,000-square-metre (2,200,000 ft^{2}) Galereya shopping center opened on the square, including a large Stockmann department store.

== Transport hub ==
The Vosstaniya Square is a major traffic hub of Saint Petersburg. It is home to the large Moscow Rail Terminal, from where trains depart for Moscow, Novosibirsk and other major cities. It is filled with passengers every day.

The square is home to the metro station Ploshchad Vosstaniya. The square is also a main hub for marshrutkas, taxis, buses, trolleybuses and trams.

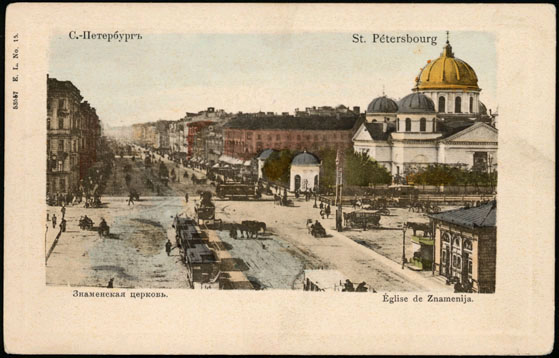
View of Nevsky Prospekt from Znamenskaya Square in the 1890s

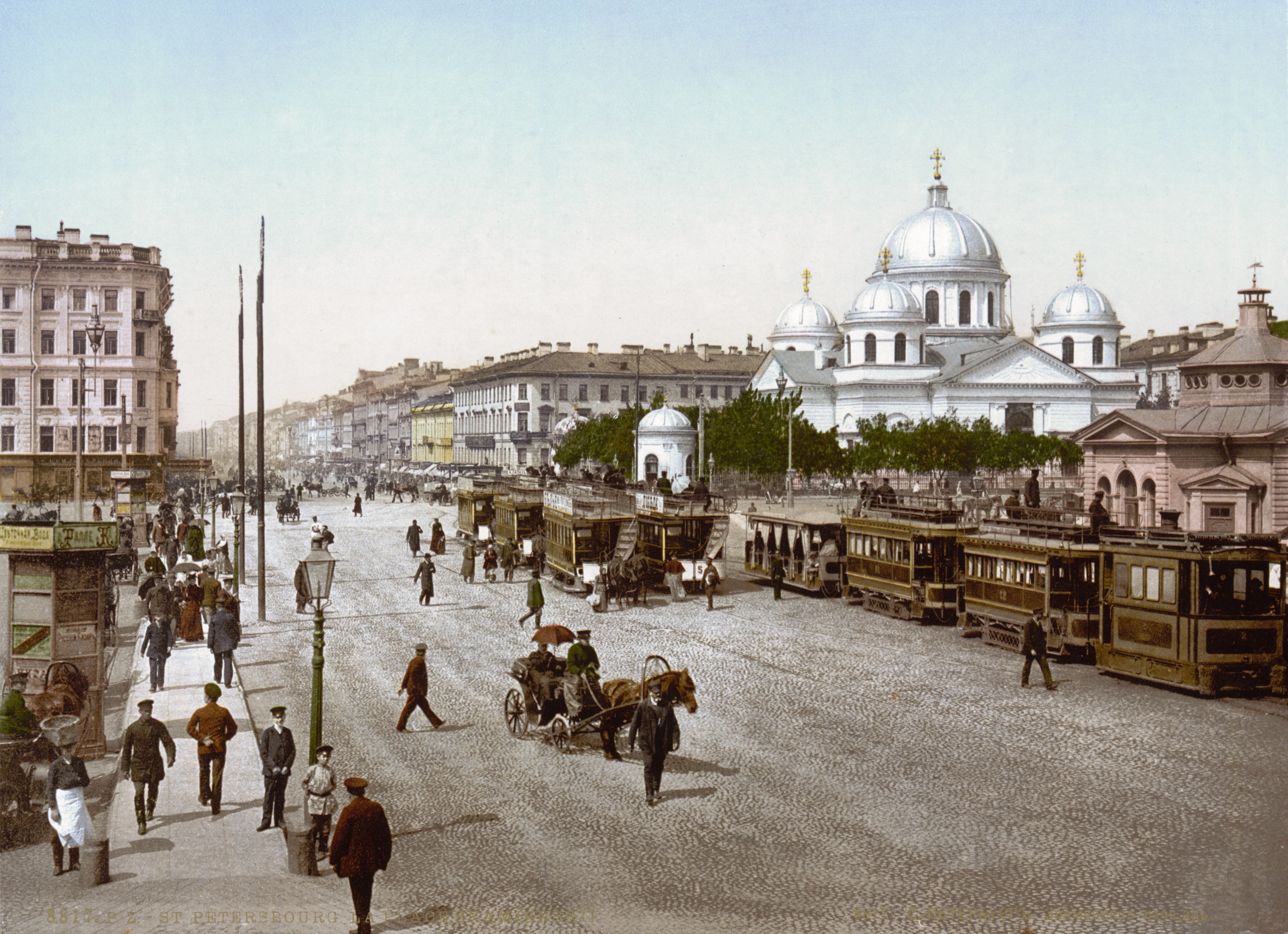
The Church of the Sign on Znamenskaya Square (built in 1794–1804), demolished in 1940

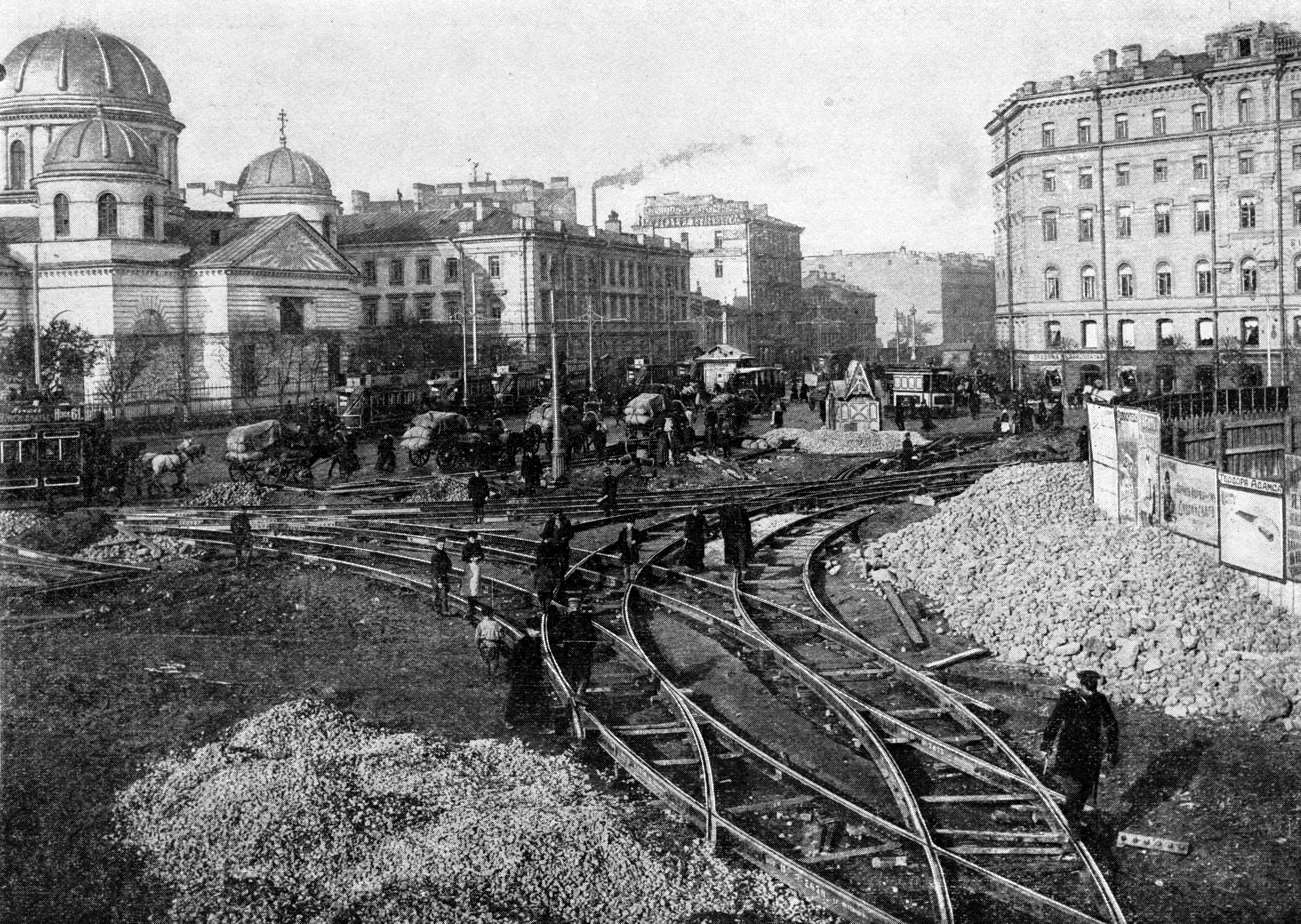
Construction of the tramway junction, 1906

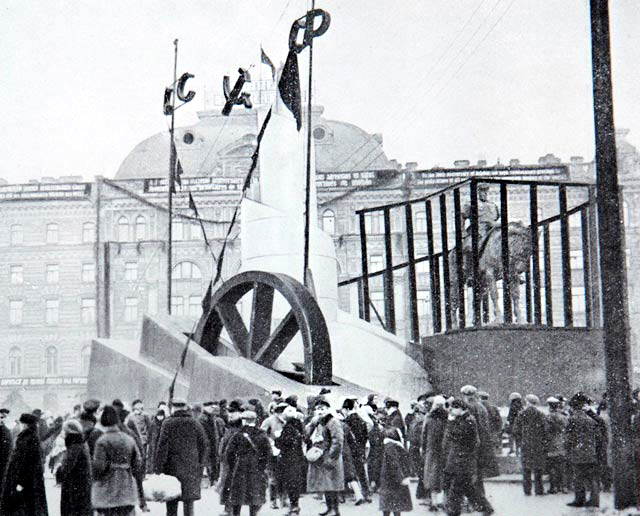
Under the Soviet regime, 1927

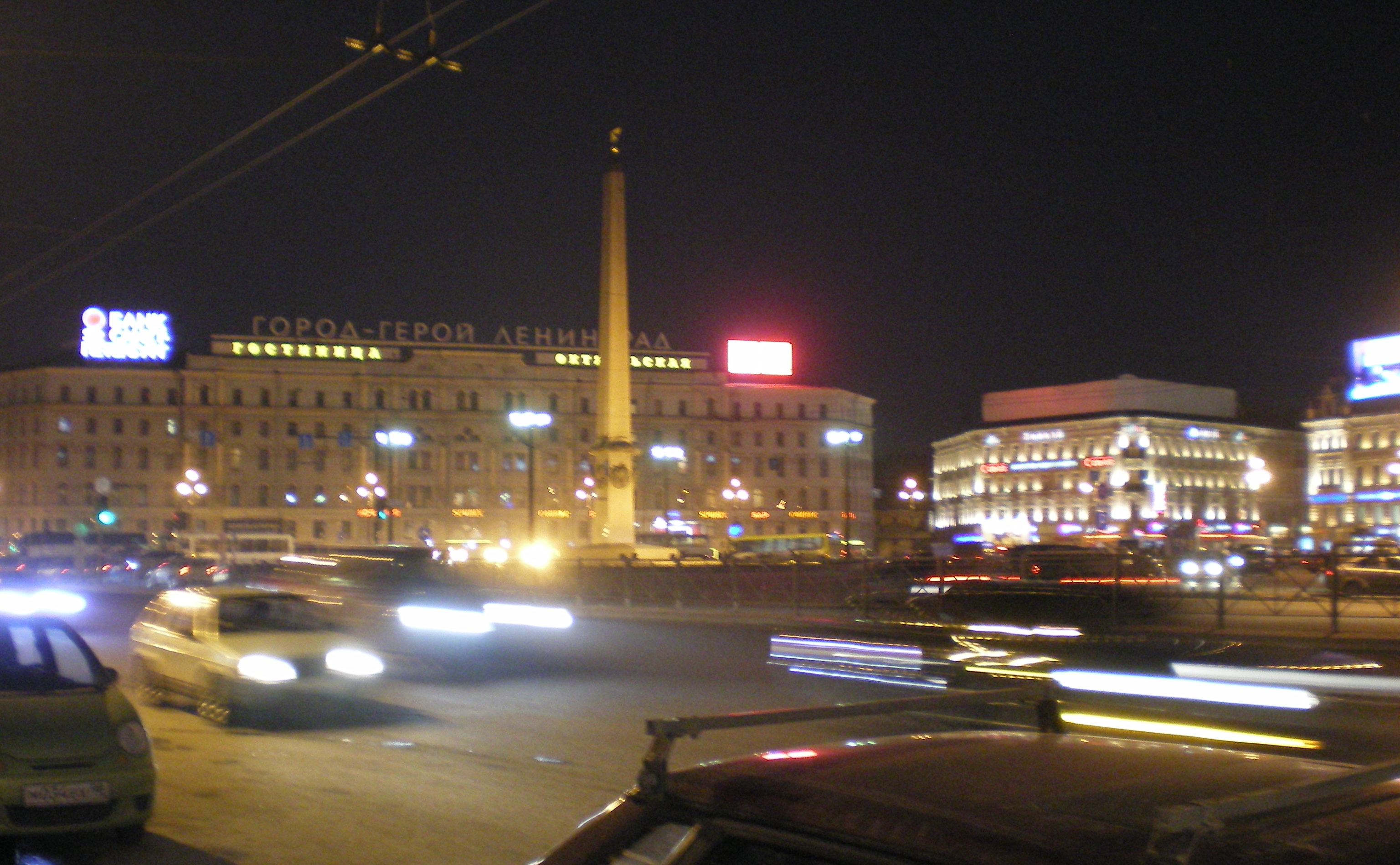
Vosstania Square and Oktyabrskiy hotel (hotel of the October Revolution, before 1922: the Northern hotel)

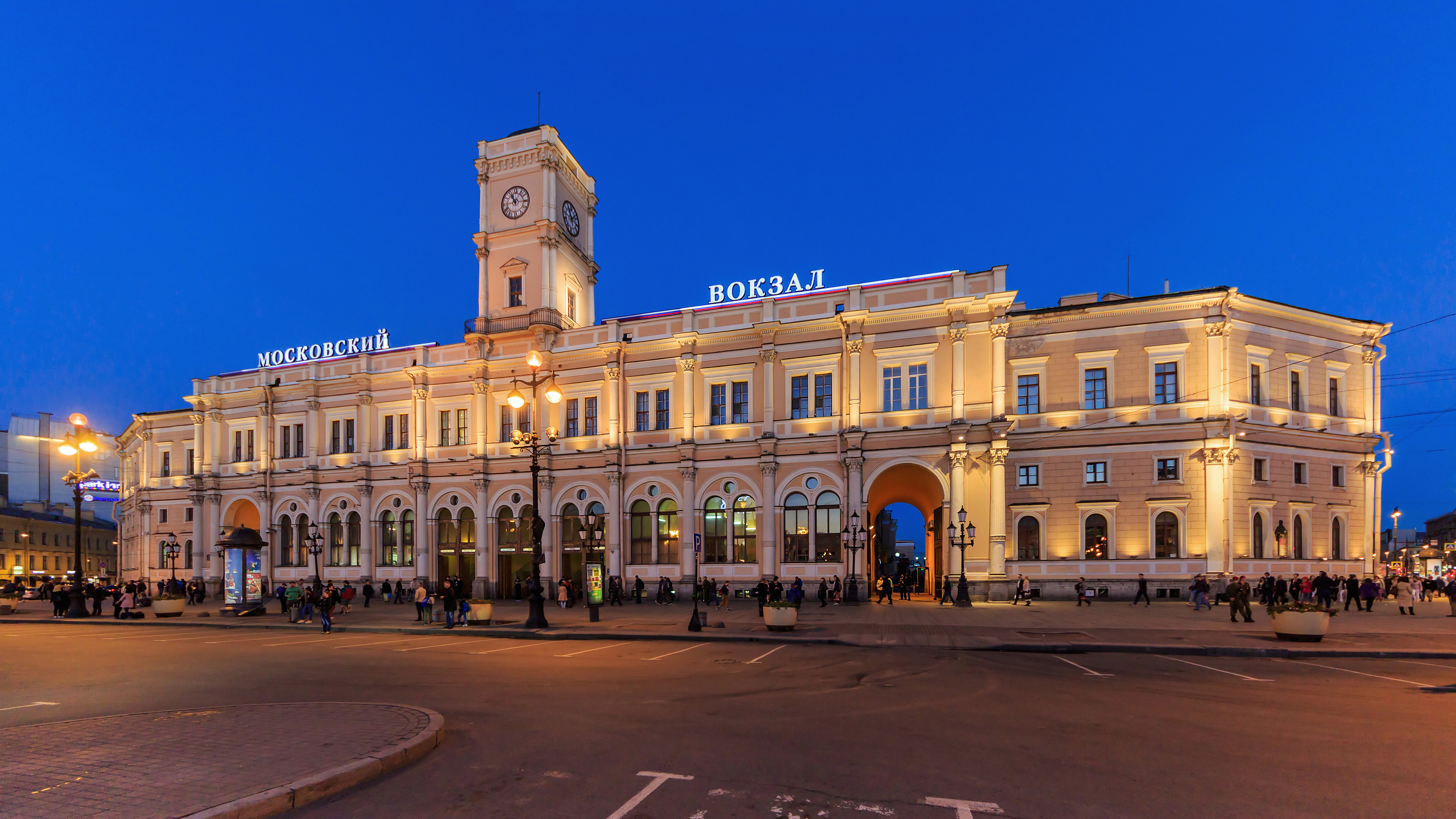
Moscow Rail Terminal

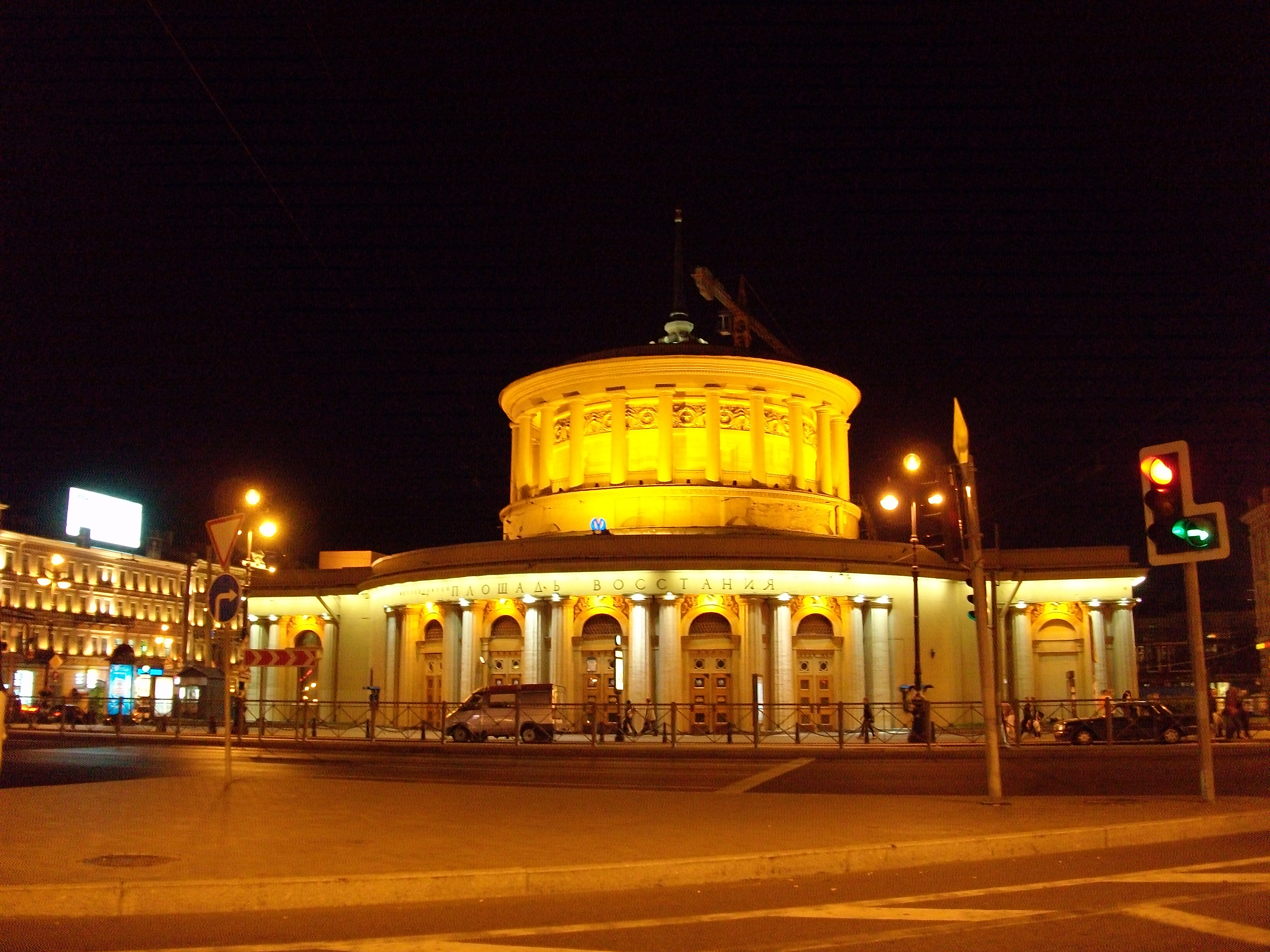
Metro station Ploshchad Vosstaniya

== See also ==
- List of squares in Saint Petersburg
