= Lukyan =

- Gender: Male
- Language: Russian

Origin
- Origin: Latin
- Meaning: bringer of light

Other names
- Nickname: Lukasha
- Derived: Lucian
- Related names: Luka, Lucas

Lukyan is a variant of the Latin masculine given name Lucian. It means 'light', or 'bringer of light'. It is also used as a given name in Russian, and sometimes a surname.

== Lukyan in fiction ==
- Lukyan Judasson, creator of The Way of Cross and Dragon, a fictional religious text in the novel of the same name by George R. R. Martin.
