= Serious (Whitehead Bros. album) =

Studio album by Whitehead Bros.
- Released: August 23, 1994
- Recorded: 1993–1994
- Genre: R&B
- Length: 1:00:13
- Label: Motown
- Producer: Bert Price; Brian Williams; Eric Cody; Kenny Whitehead; McKinley Horton; Michael Angelo Saulsberry; Roy Pennon

Whitehead Bros. chronology
Kenny and Johnny the Whitehead Brothers (1986)	Serious (1994)

Singles from Serious
- 1. "Your Love Is a 187" Released: 1994; 2. "Forget I Was a G" Released: 1994; 3. "Sex on the Beach" Released: 1995

Professional ratings
Review scores
Source	Rating
AllMusic	2.5/5 stars

Serious is the second studio album by American musical duo the Whitehead Bros. It was released on August 23, 1994, through Motown. Production was handled by member Kenny Whitehead, Roy Pennon, Bert Price, Brian Williams, Eric Cody, McKinley Horton and Michael Angelo Saulsberry with co-producer Larry Gold. In the United States, the album reached Top 40 on the Top R&B/Hip-Hop Albums and number 13 on the Heatseekers charts. It also made it to number 100 on the UK Albums Chart and number 18 on the Official Hip Hop and R&B Albums Chart in the United Kingdom.

The album was supported with three singles: "Your Love Is a 187", "Forget I Was a G" and "Sex on the Beach". Its lead single, "Your Love Is a 187", become the Whitehead Bros.'s biggest hit, reaching number 76 on the Billboard Hot 100 and number 15 on the Hot R&B/Hip-Hop Songs in the US and number 32 on the UK singles chart and number 4 on the Official Hip Hop and R&B Singles Chart in the UK. The album's second single, "Forget I Was a G", peaked at number 32 on the US Hot R&B/Hip-Hop Songs, number 40 on the UK singles chart and number 6 on the Official Hip Hop and R&B Singles Chart, and was featured in Doug McHenry's film Jason's Lyric as well as on its soundtrack. The third single off of the album, "Sex on the Beach", went briefly charted on the Hot R&B/Hip-Hop Songs at the 102nd spot.

== Track listing ==
No.	Title	Writer(s)	Producer(s)	Length
1.	"Forget I Was a "G""	Kenneth Whitehead; Errol Johnson; Robert Bell; Ronald Bell; Donald Boyce; Melvin Brown; Robert Mickens; Claydes Charles Smith; Dennis Thomas; Ricky West	Kenny Whitehead; Larry Gold (co.)	4:06
2.	"Your Love Is a 187"	K. Whitehead; Johnson; Andre Young; Calvin Broadus	Kenny Whitehead; Larry Gold (co.)	4:43
3.	"Shaniqua"	K. Whitehead; Suamana Brown; Roy Pennon	Roy "Dog" Pennon	4:05
4.	"Change"	Betram Price; Eric Cody	Betr Price; CoDee	4:08
5.	"Interlude"	K. Whitehead	Kenny Whitehead	1:26
6.	"Late Nite Tip"	K. Whitehead	Kenny Whitehead; Larry Gold (co.)	4:06
7.	"Just a Touch of Love"	Danny Webster; Mark Adams; Mark Hicks	Michael Angelo Saulsberry	5:12
8.	"Where Ya At?" (Interlude)	K. Whitehead	Kenny Whitehead; Larry Gold (co.)	2:23
9.	"Serious"	K. Whitehead	Kenny Whitehead; Larry Gold (co.)	4:25
10.	"Beautiful Black Princess"	K. Whitehead	Kenny Whitehead; Larry Gold (co.)	3:42
11.	"Sex on the Beach"	K. Whitehead	Kenny Whitehead; Larry Gold (co.)	4:29
12.	"Turn U Out"	K. Whitehead	Kenny Whitehead; Roy "Dog" Pennon	4:58
13.	"She Needed Me"	Ann Gore; James McKinley Horton	McKinley Horton	5:58
14.	"Love Goes On"	K. Whitehead; John Whitehead Jr.; Anita Whitehead	Kenny Whitehead; Brian Williams	5:07
15.	"Beautiful Black Princess" (Reprise)	K. Whitehead	Kenny Whitehead; Larry Gold (co.)	1:25
Total length:				1:00:13

Sample credits

- Track 1 contains a replayed sample from "Jungle Boogie" written by Robert "Kool" Bell, Ronald Bell, George Melvin Brown, Claydes Charles Smith, Robert "Spike" Mickens, Donald Boyce, Ricky Westfield and Dennis "Dee Tee" Thomas.
- Track 2 contains a sample from "Deep Cover" written and performed by Dr. Dre and Snoop Dogg.

== Personnel ==
- Kenny Whitehead – lead vocals (tracks: 1–12, 14, 15), backing vocals (tracks: 1, 2, 6), keyboards (tracks: 1–13, 15), guitar (tracks: 1, 2, 6), acoustic guitar (track 15), producer (tracks: 1, 2, 5, 6, 8–12, 14, 15), programming, arrangement, vocal arranger (tracks: 3, 7, 14, 15), strings arranger (track 10), mixing
- Johnny Whitehead – lead vocals (tracks: 1–9, 11, 13, 14), backing vocals (tracks: 1, 2, 6), arrangement, vocal arranger (track 7), mixing
- Errol Johnson – backing vocals (tracks: 1, 2)
- Suamana "Swoop" Brown – additional backing vocals (track 3)
- Vivian Davis – additional backing vocals (track 3)
- Nicole Renée Harris – backing vocals (track 6), voice (track 11)
- Shani Bayete – backing vocals (track 6)
- Michael Angelo Saulsberry – backing vocals, producer & vocal arranger (track 7)
- Eric Kirkland – backing vocals (track 7)
- Joyce Tolbert – backing vocals (track 7)
- Crystal Alford – voice (track 2)
- Larry Gold – cello (tracks: 10, 15), co-producer (tracks: 1, 2, 6, 8–11, 15), programming, strings arranger (track 10), mixing, engineering
- Roy "Dog" Pennon – keyboards (track 12), producer (tracks: 3, 12), vocal arrangement (track 3)
- Brian Williams – keyboards & producer (track 14), mixing
- Bert Price – producer (track 4), engineering
- Eric Cody – producer (track 4), engineering
- McKinley Horton – producer (track 13)
- Roy "Dog" Pennon – vocal arranger (track 3)
- Eric Kirkland – vocal arranger (track 7)
- Mitch Goldfarb – engineering, mixing
- Jon Smeltz – engineering, mixing
- Jeff Chestek – engineering
- John Harpowich – engineering
- Michael Prince – engineering
- Nazeeh Islam – engineering
- Tom DiMarino – engineering
- Booker T. Jones III – mixing
- Conley Abrams – mixing
- Kevin Reynolds – mixing
- Don Fabana – engineering assistant
- Sheila Matterson – engineering assistant
- Herb Powers Jr. – mastering
- Darrale Jones – executive producer, A&R direction
- Steve McKeever – executive producer
- Jonathan Clark – art direction
- Shauna Woods – graphic design
- Michael Miller – photography
- Lisa Smith-Craig – production coordinator A&R

== Charts ==
Chart (1995)	Peak position
UK Albums (OCC)	100
UK R&B Albums (OCC)	18
