= Buffon Islands =

Island group in Adélie Land, Antarctica

- Location within Antarctica

Geography
- Location: Antarctica
- Coordinates: 66°40′S 140°1′E

Administration
- Administered under the Antarctic Treaty System

Demographics
- Population: Uninhabited

The Buffon Islands are a group of three adjoining, rocky islands, together about 0.5 kilometres (0.25 nmi) in extent, lying 0.2 kilometres (0.1 nmi) east of Petrel Island in the Géologie Archipelago. They were charted in 1951 by the French Antarctic Expedition and named by them for Georges Buffon, a noted French naturalist.

== See also ==
- List of Antarctic and subantarctic islands
