= Vladimir Lukyanov =

Russian painter and architect

Vladimir Sergeevich Lukyanov
- Владимир Сергеевич Лукьянов
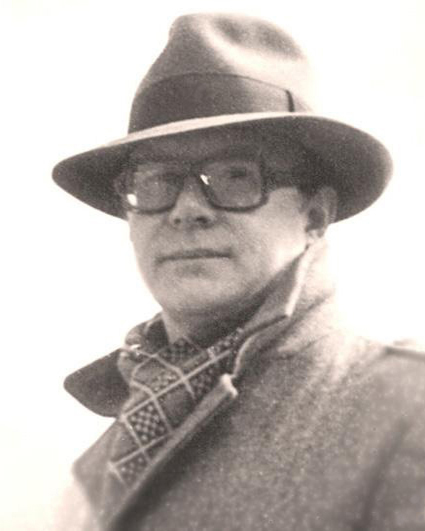
- Vladimir Lukyanov in 1985
- Born: August 18, 1945; Saint Petersburg, USSR
- Education: Saint Petersburg Art and Industry Academy
- Occupation(s): Architect, painter

Vladimir Sergeevich Lukyanov (Russian: Владимир Сергеевич Лукьянов; born 18 August 1945) is a Russian architect, painter and graphic artist.

Lukyanov was born in Leningrad and educated at the Saint Petersburg Art and Industry Academy. Early in his career he designed buildings and facilities for Siberia and the Far North, influenced by his graduate school professor, architect Alexander Shipkov. Lukyanov's most notable architectural work are his memorials. In both his architecture and visual arts Lukyanov takes on neo-classical themes and style.

Lukyanov has been a member of the Union of Soviet Architects since 1980. His wife Tatyana V. Lukyanov is a noted artist.

See: The Lukyanov family Tree (ru.)

== Work ==
Lykyanov's major work includes:

- Leningrad Hero City Obelisk, Vosstaniya Square, St. Petersburg, with A. I. Alymov, 1985
- multiple "Our Daily Bread" monuments along the Road of Life (Rzhevskij Corridor), commemorating the Siege of Leningrad, 1985
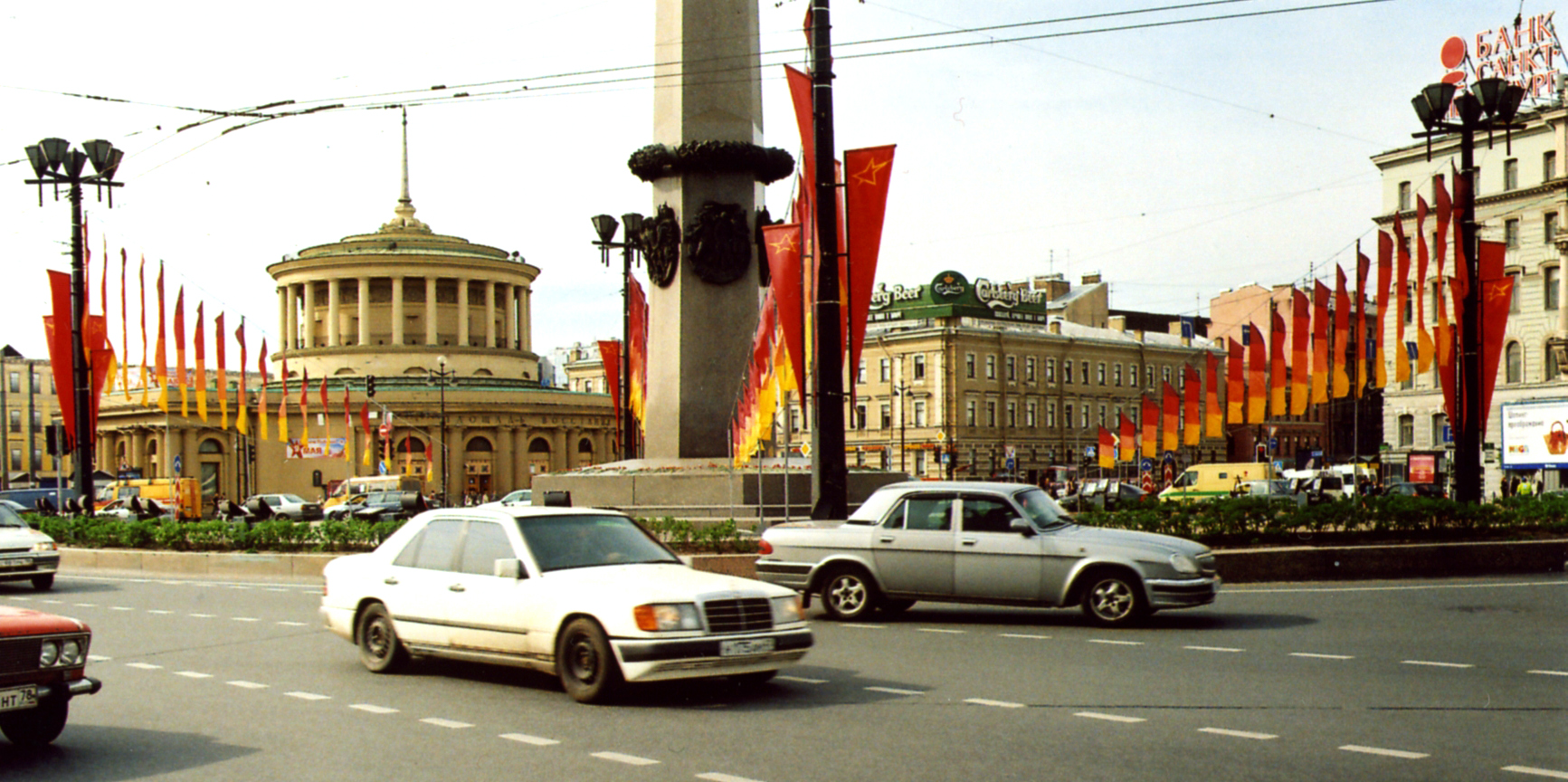
  Vosstaniya Square in Leningrad Leningrad Hero City Obelisk (Architects V. S. Lukyanov and A. I. Alymov. 1985)
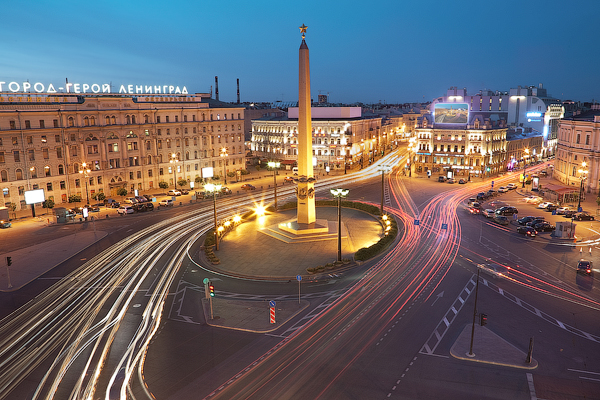
  Vosstaniya Square in Leningrad Leningrad Hero City Obelisk (Architects V. S. Lukyanov and A. I. Alymov. 1985)
