= Yahya =

Yahya may refer to:

- Yahya (name), a common Arabic male given name
- Tepe Yahya, an archaeological site in Kermān Province, Iran
- An ancient culture known as Yahya culture
