= Ivan Lukyanov =

Ivan Lukyanov may refer to:

- Ivan Lukyanov (athlete) (born 1981), Moldovan/Russian steeplechase runner
- Ivan Lukyanov (footballer) (born 1990), Russian football player
