= Merchant Pshenichnikov's house =

Merchant Pshenichnikov's House
- Дом купца Пшеничникова
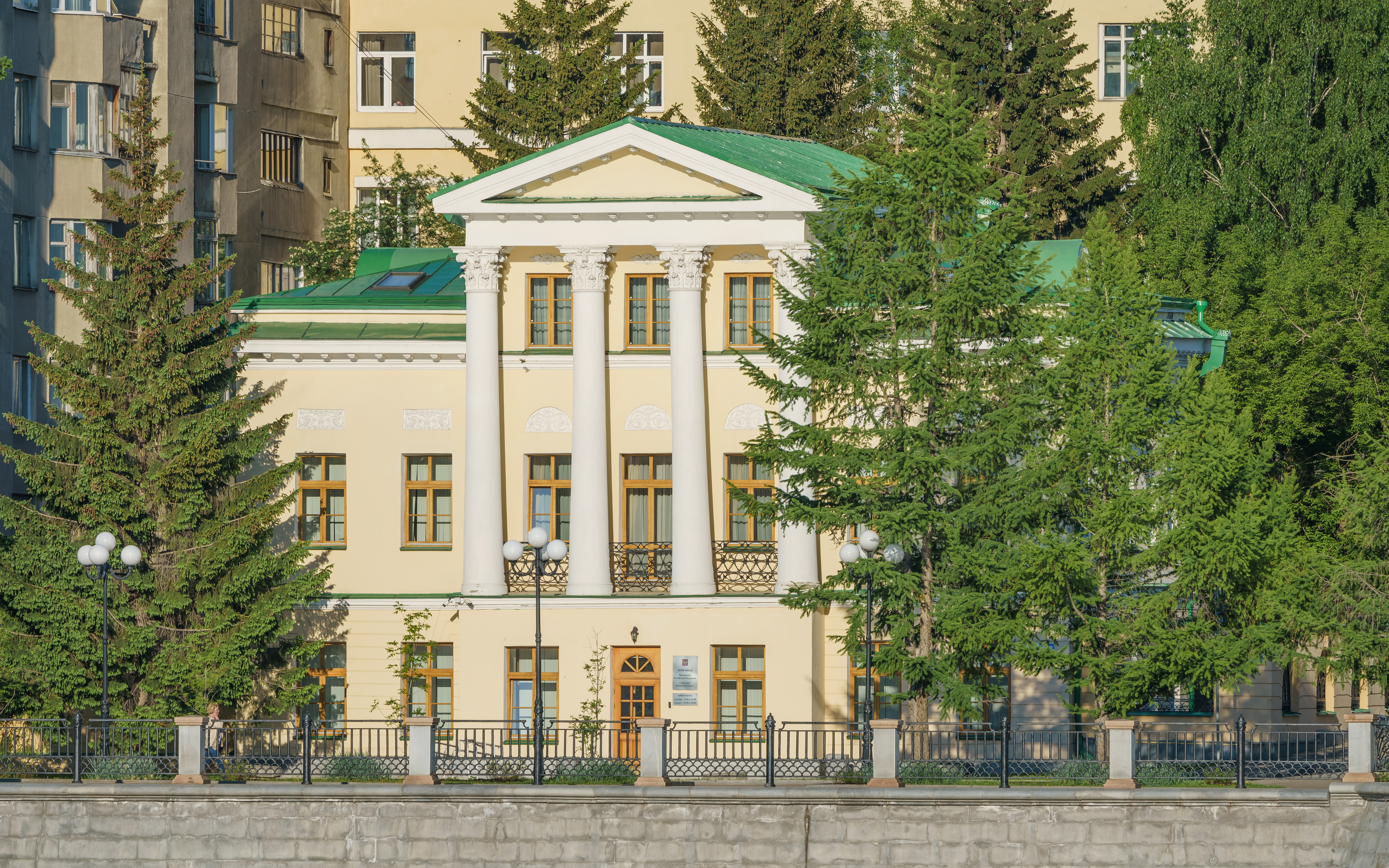
- Interactive map of the Merchant Pshenichnikov's House area

General information
- Location: Yekaterinburg, Russia, 2 Quay of Working Youth
- Coordinates: 56°50′24″N 60°36′02″E
- Completed: 1830

Merchant Pshenichnikov's House is located in the historical center of Yekaterinburg, Sverdlovsk Oblast in Russia.

The building was granted the status of federal significance on 30 August 1960 (Council of Ministers of the RSFSR Decree № 1327). Its cultural heritage of regional significance object number is 661710759180005.

== Architecture ==
The two-story house was designed in the style of the classicism of the first half of the 19th century and has an elongated rectangular shape with a mezzanine.

The first floor is all horizontally indented in a rustic style. It is decorated with small ledges, one of which has a four-column Corinthian portico covering the second floor and reaching the mezzanine level. Between these columns is a balcony with wrought-iron and cast-iron bars.

The walls of the second floor are smooth, with niches above the windows. These niches, filled with stucco, are semicircular behind the portico and horizontal on the side.

== Gallery ==
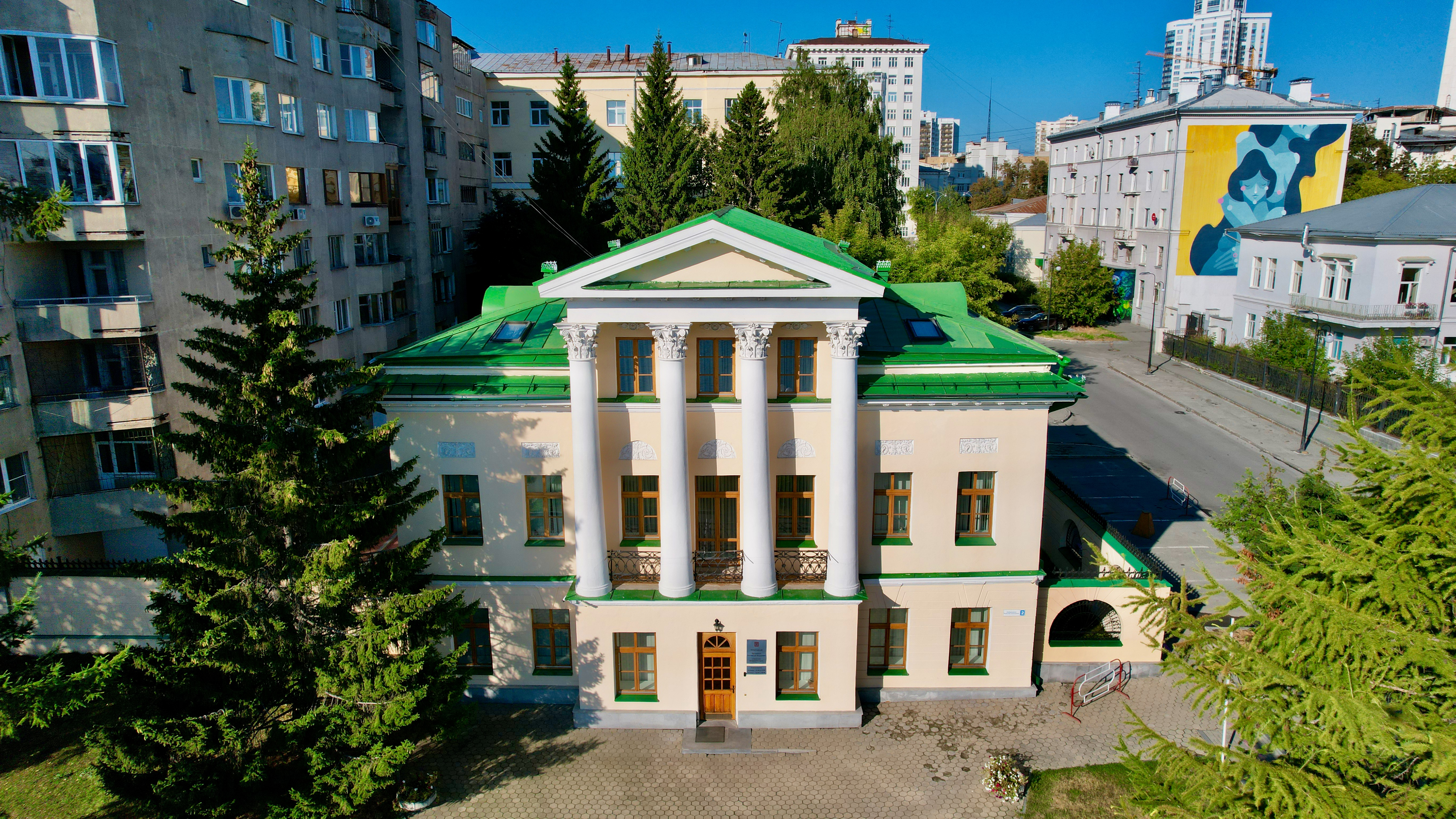
September 2022

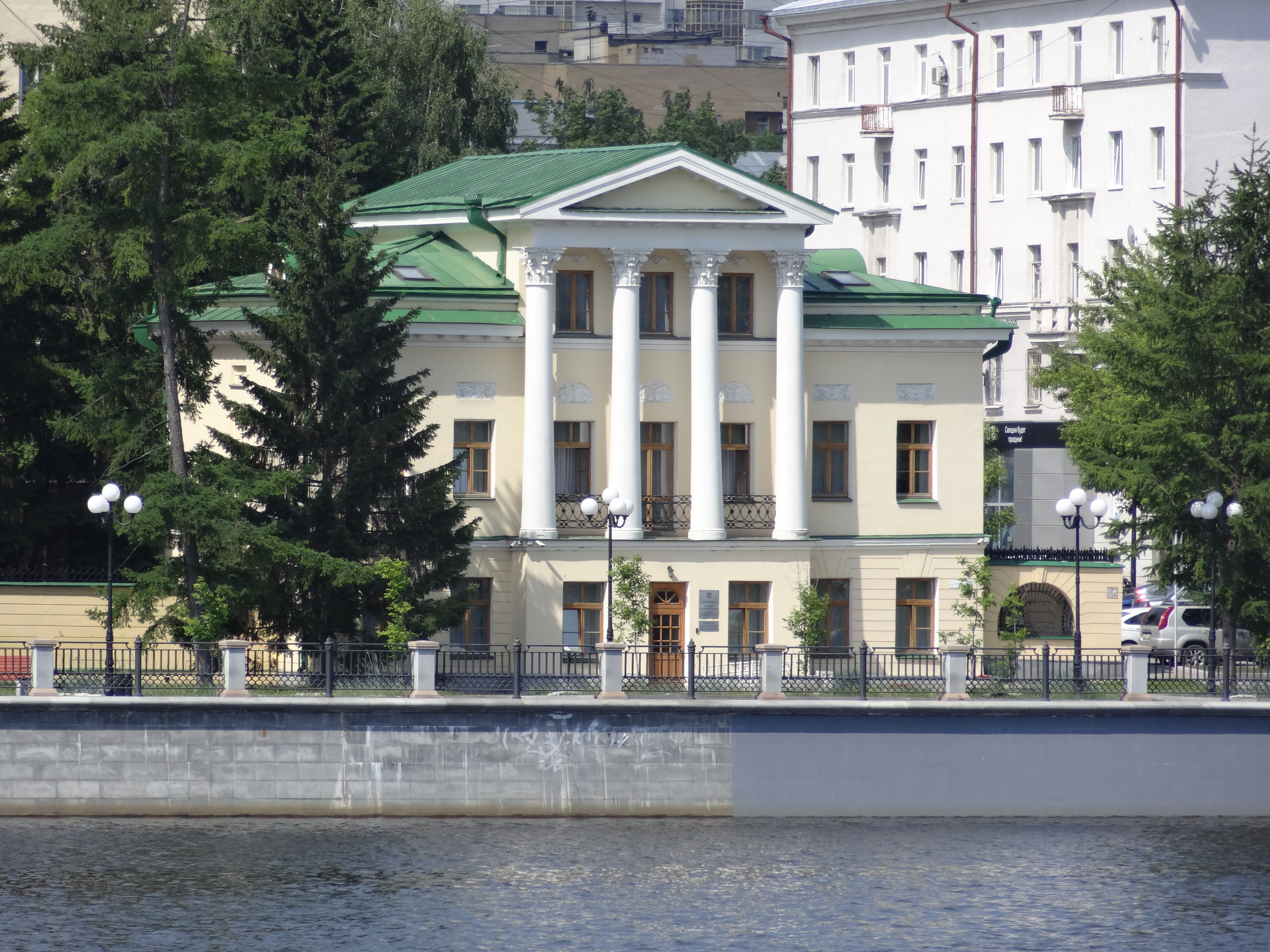
June 2018

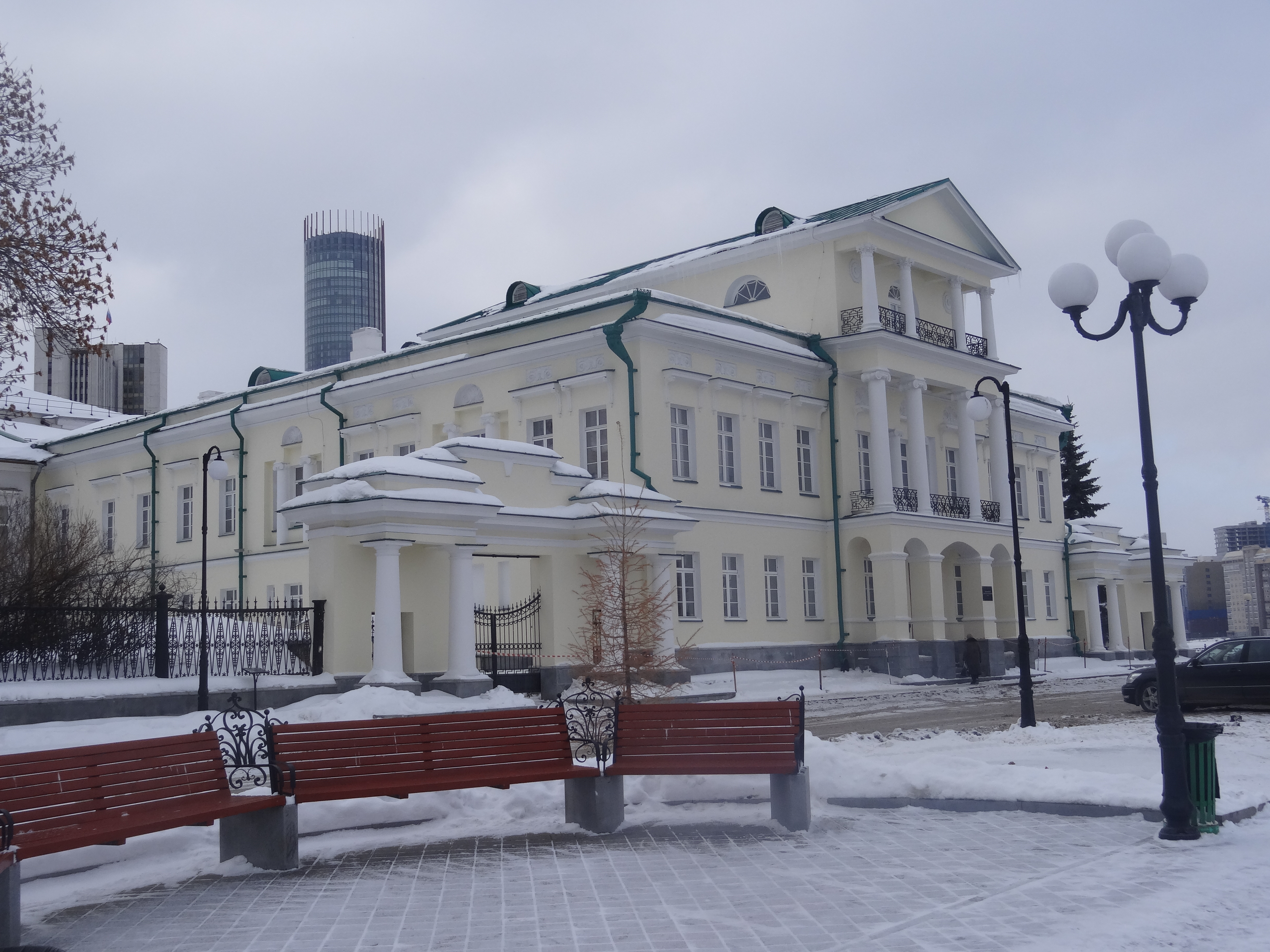
February 2019

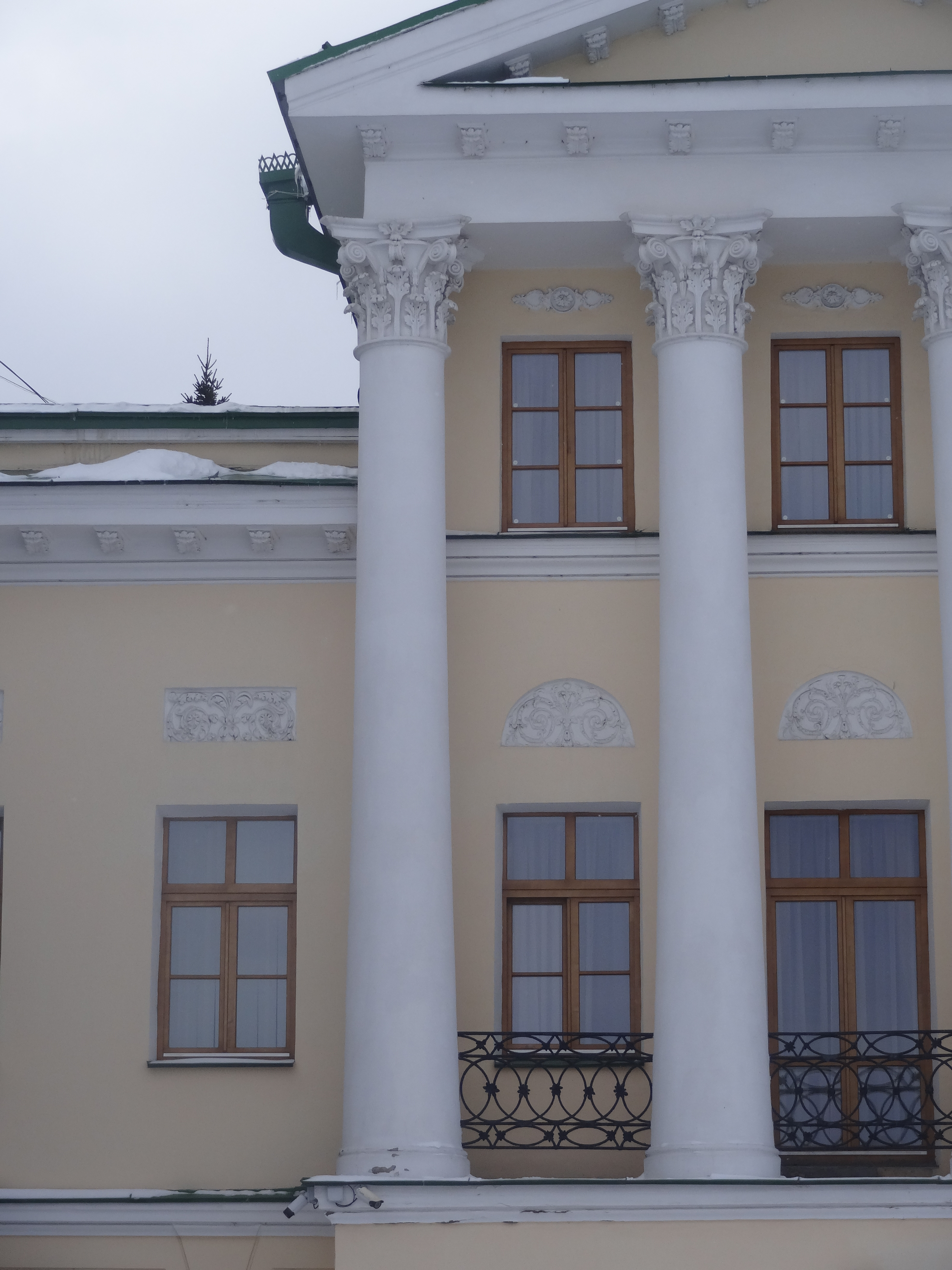
Details. February 2019

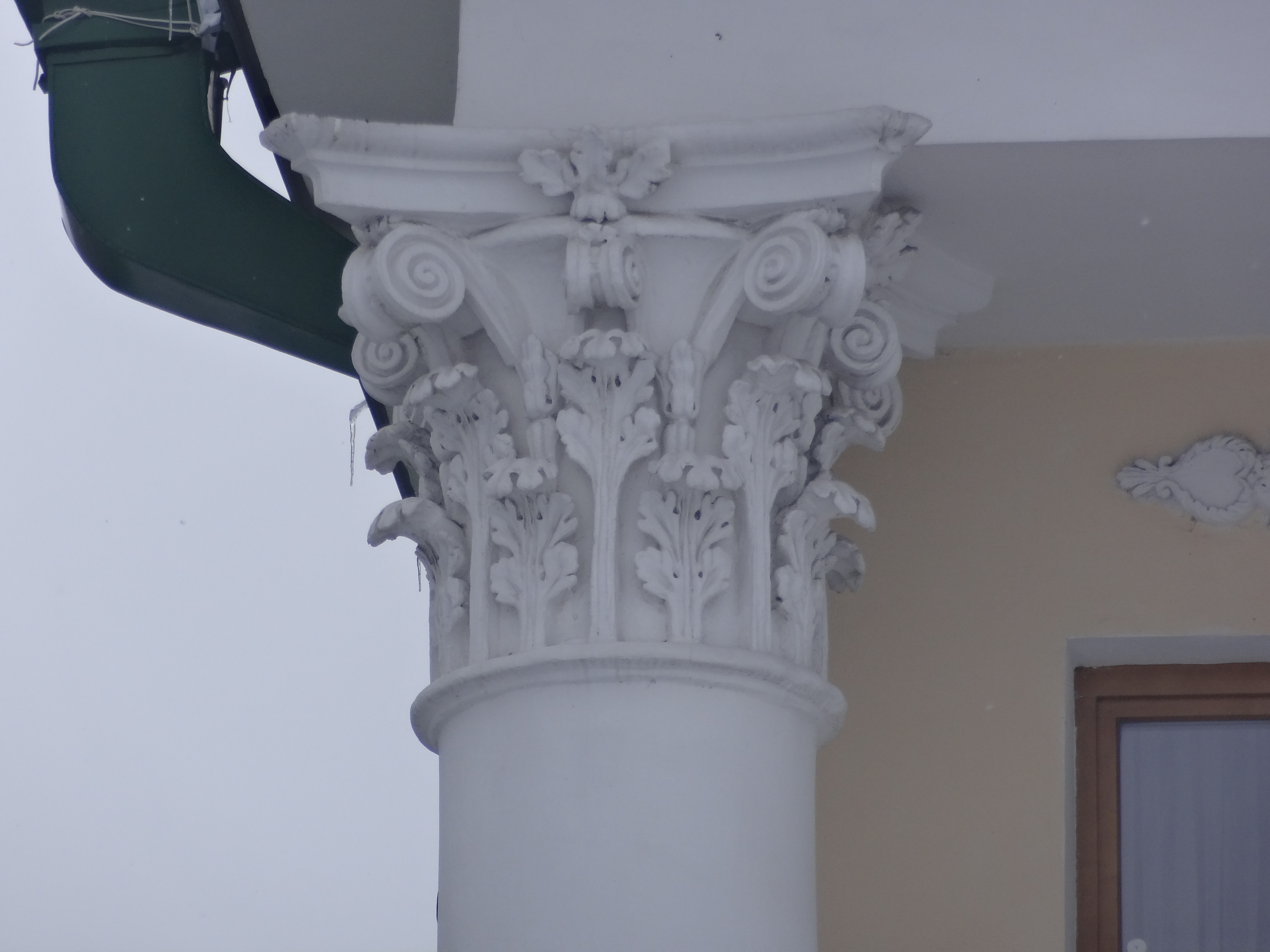
Details. February 2019

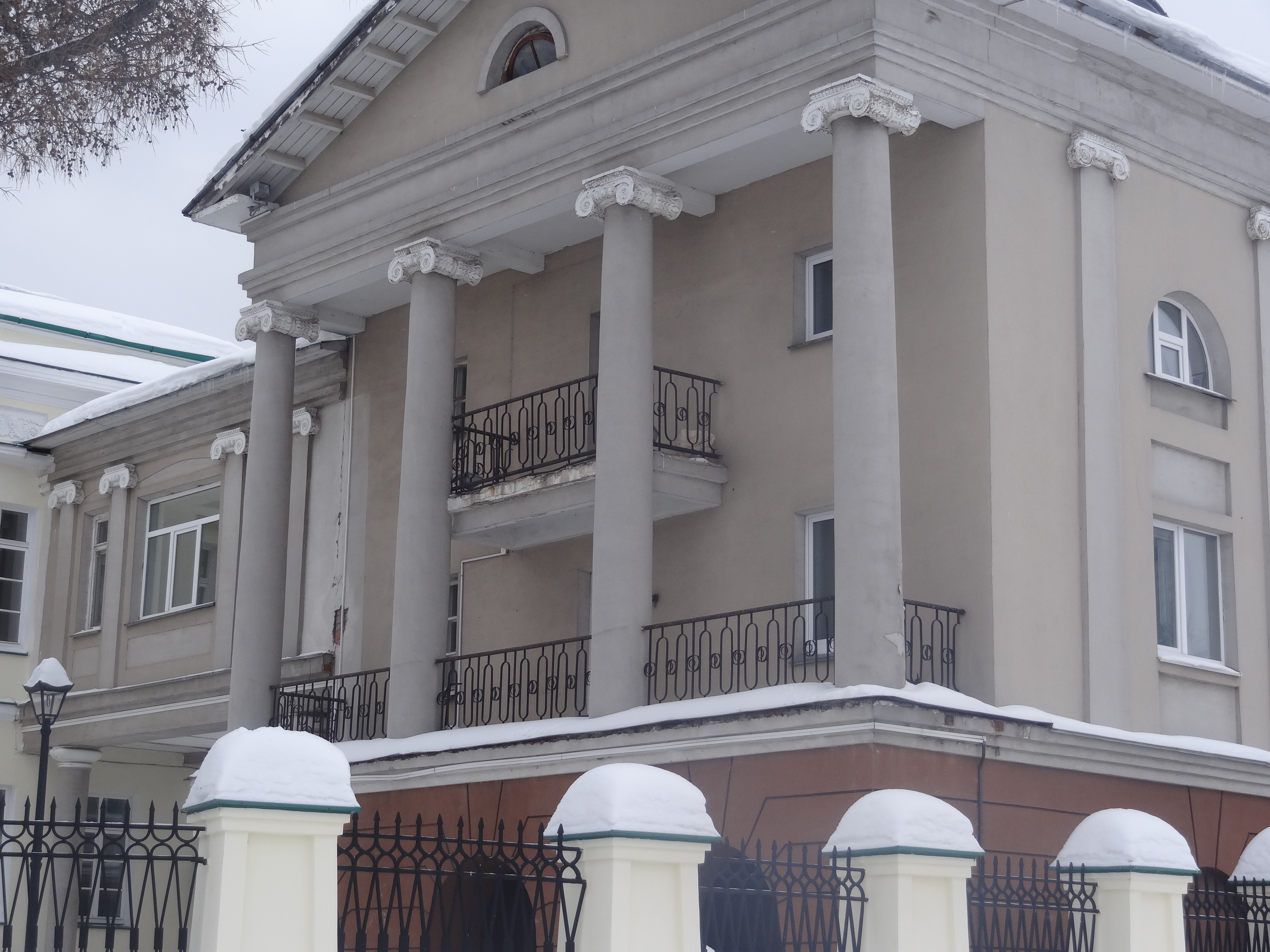
Details. February 2019

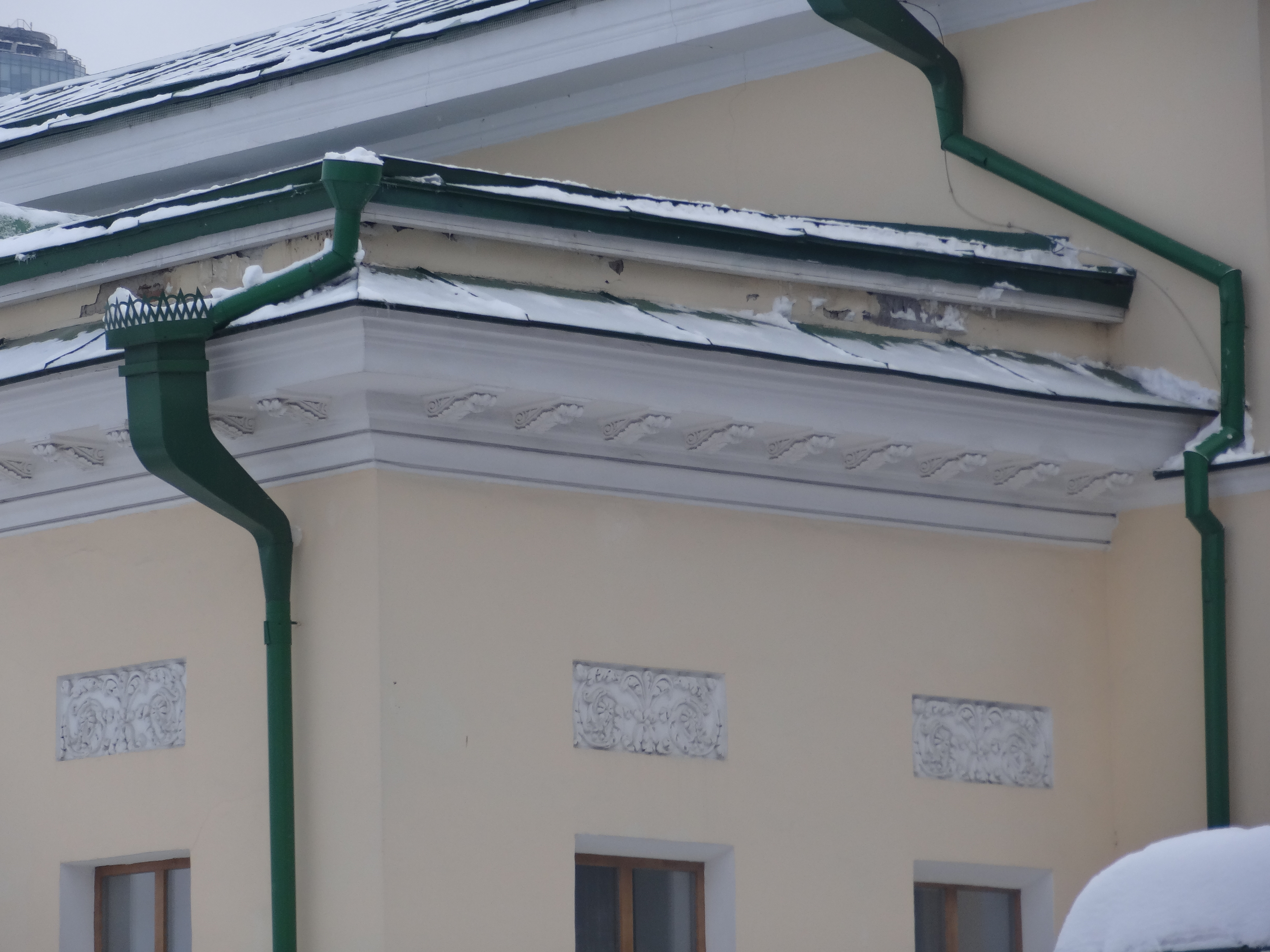
Details. February 2019

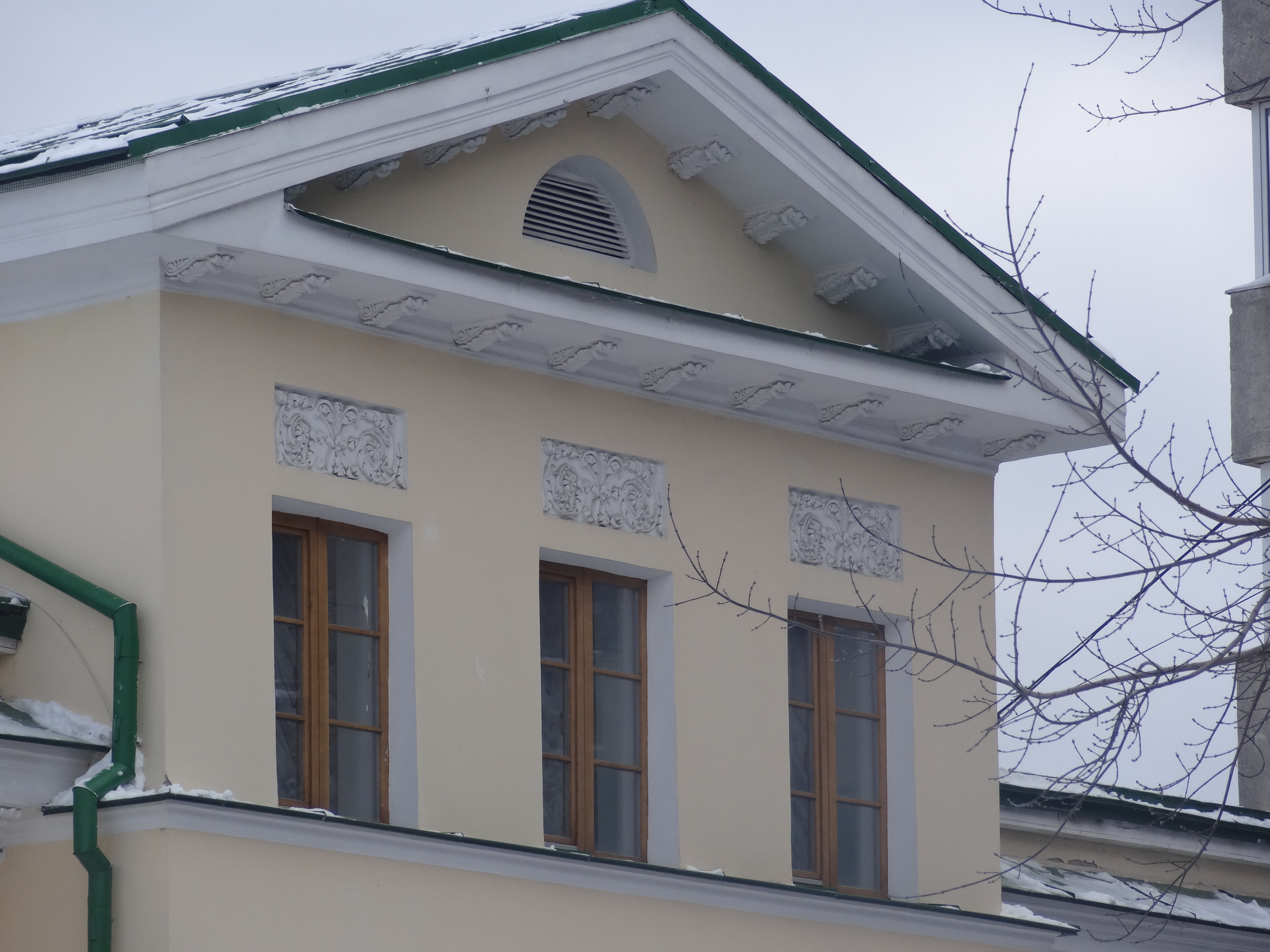
Details. February 2019

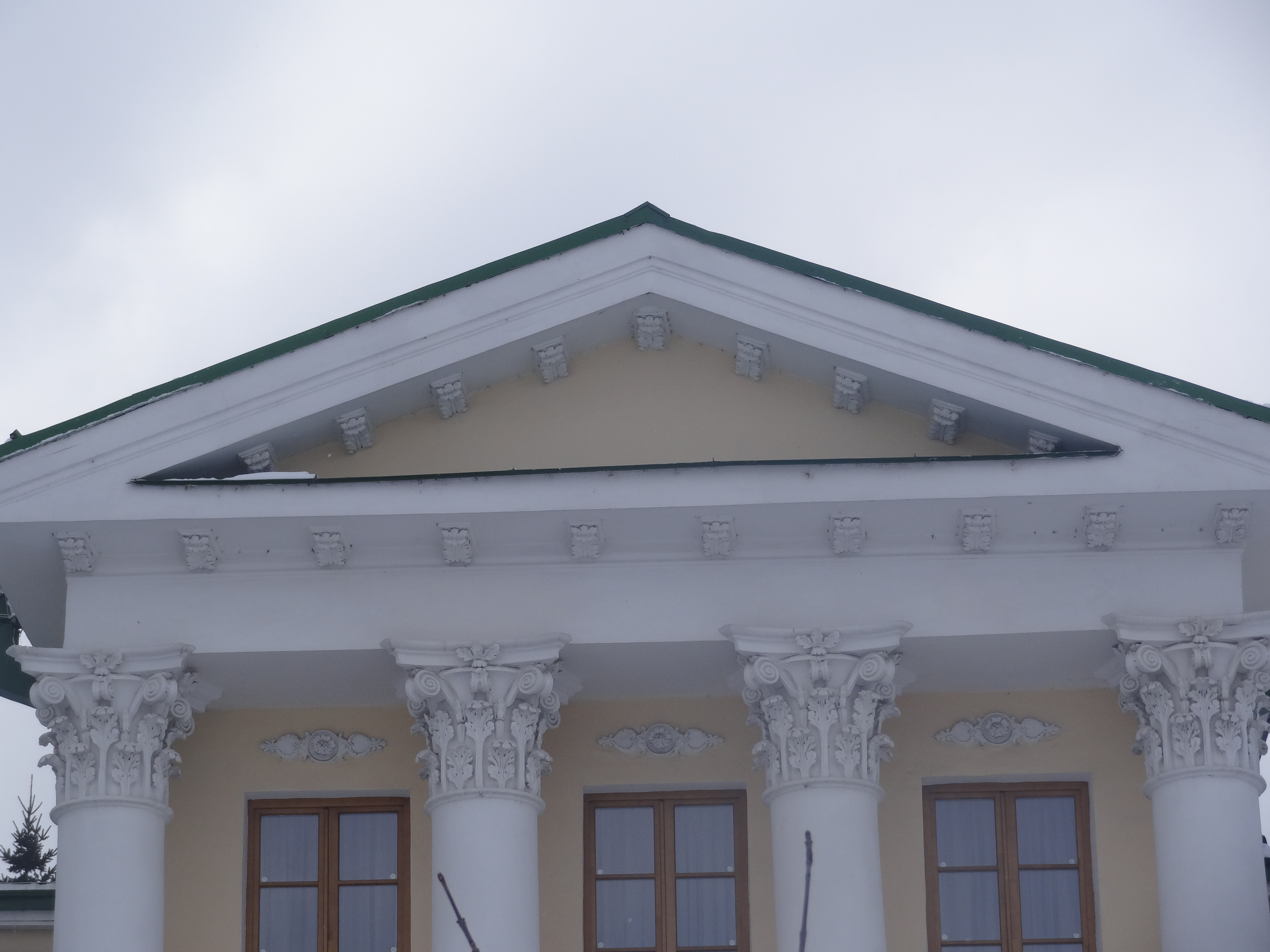
Details. February 2019

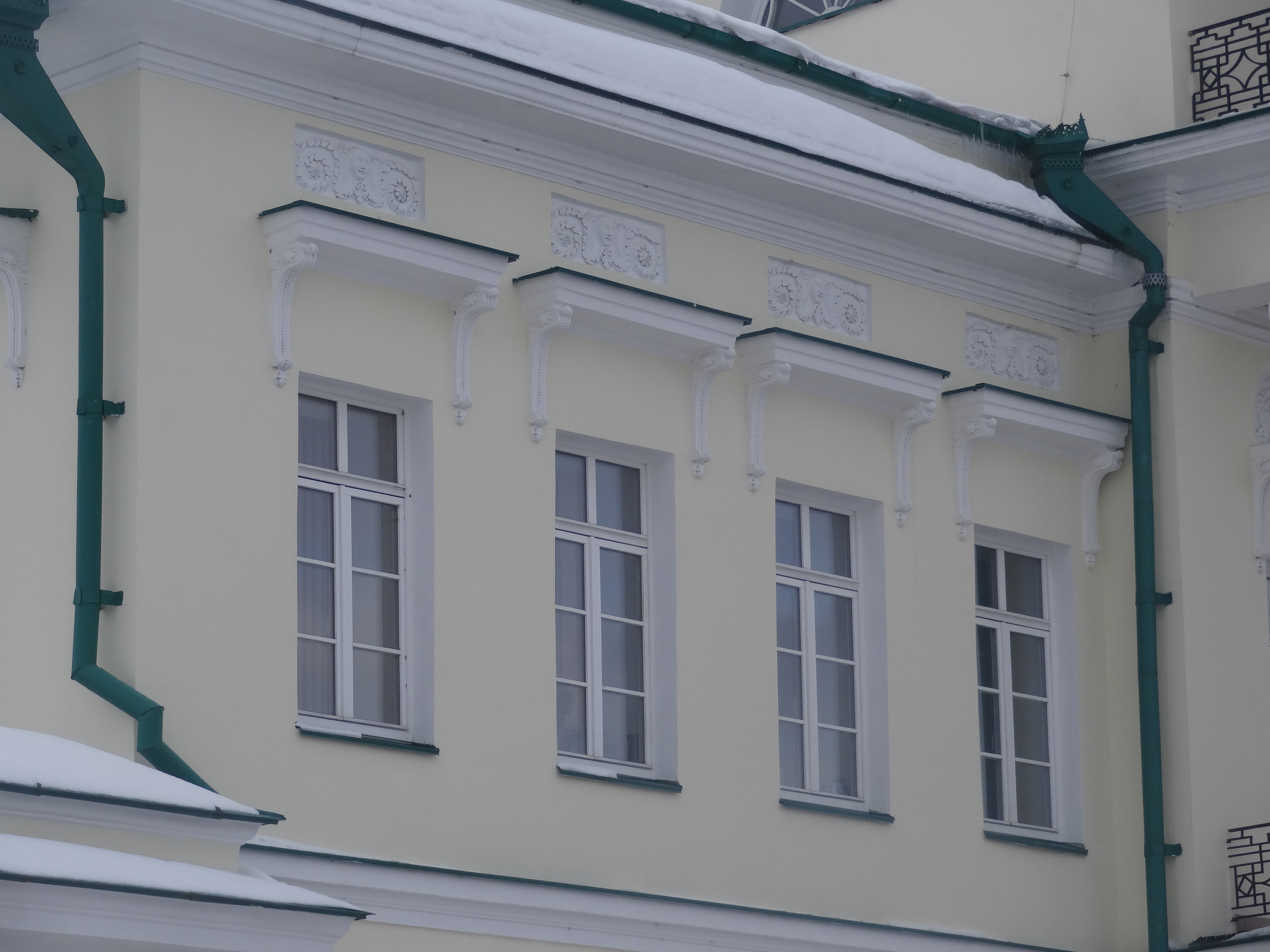
Details. February 2019

== Literature ==
- ред. В.Е.Звагельская (2008). Свод памятников истории и культуры Свердловской области. Vol. 2. Екатеринбург: Сократ. p. 648. ISBN 978-5-88664-323-7.
