= List of ambassadors of Russia to Poland =

Ambassador of the Russian Federation to the Republic of Poland
- Emblem of the Russian Foreign Ministry
- Incumbent; Vacant
- Ministry of Foreign Affairs; Embassy of Russia in Warsaw
- Style: His Excellency
- Reports to: Minister of Foreign Affairs
- Seat: Warsaw
- Appointer: President of Russia
- Term length: At the pleasure of the president
- Website: Russian Embassy in Poland

The ambassador extraordinary and plenipotentiary of the Russian Federation to Republic of Poland is the official representative of the president and the government of the Russian Federation to the president and the government of Poland.

The ambassador and his staff work at large in the Embassy of Russia in Warsaw. There are consulates general in Gdańsk, Kraków, and Poznań. The post of Russian ambassador to Poland is currently vacant, following the recall of Sergey Andreyev on 2 December 2025.

== History of diplomatic relations ==
Poland and Russia have exchanged diplomatic missions for centuries. The first ambassador in the modern meaning of this word, from Poland to Russia, was Antoni Augustyn Deboli, in the late 18th century. After the period of partitions of Poland, in 1918, relations were established between the Second Polish Republic and Soviet Union. After Soviet invasion of Poland in 1939 those relations were broken, to be briefly reestablished in 1941 after the German invasion of the Soviet Union, when the Soviet Union and Polish government in exile agreed to cooperate against their common enemy, Nazi Germany. Those relations were broken in 1943 after discovery of the Katyn massacre. In 1989 the communist government of the Polish People's Republic was replaced with a democratic form that continues to the present; after the dissolution of the Soviet Union in 1991, Poland recognised the Russian Federation.

== List of representatives (1508–present) ==
=== Tsardom of Russia to the Kingdom of Poland (1508) ===
Name	Title	Appointment	Termination	Notes
Ivan Chelyadin	Envoy	1508	1508	

=== Tsardom of Russia to the Polish-Lithuanian Commonwealth (1584–1721) ===
Name	Title	Appointment	Termination	Notes
Mikhail Beznin-Nashchokin	Envoy	1584	1598	
Ivan Bezobrazov	Envoy	1598	1606	
Afanasy Pronchishchev	Envoy	1640	1648	
Johann Patkul	Envoy	1703	1703	
Grigory Dolgorukov	Envoy	1701	1706	
Vasily Dolgorukov	Envoy	1706	1707	
Grigory Dolgorukov	Envoy	1709	1712	
Aleksey Dashkov	Resident	1712	1718	
Semyon Naryshkin	Envoy	1714	1714	
Grigory Dolgorukov	Ambassador	1715	1721	

=== Russian Empire to the Polish-Lithuanian Commonwealth (1721–1795) ===
Name	Title	Appointment	Termination	Notes
Sergey Dolgorukov	Envoy	1721	1725	
Vasily Dolgorukov	Envoy	1725	1726	
Mikhail Bestuzhev-Ryumin	Envoy	1726	1731	
Sergey Dolgorukov	Envoy	1728	1729	
Friedrich Casimir von Loewenwolde	Ambassador	1730	1733	
Hermann Karl von Keyserling	Ambassador	1733	1744	
Mikhail Bestuzhev-Ryumin	Ambassador	1744	1748	
Hermann Karl von Keyserling	Ambassador	1749	1752	
Genrikh Gross	Ambassador	1752	1758	
Mikhail Volkonsky	Ambassador	1757	1758	
Fyodor Voeykov	Ambassador	1758	1762	
Hermann Karl von Keyserling	Ambassador	1763	1764	
Nikolai Repnin	Ambassador	1764	1768	
Mikhail Volkonsky	Ambassador	1769	1771	
Caspar von Saldern	Ambassador	1771	1772	
Otto Magnus von Stackelberg	Ambassador	1772	1790	
Yakov Bulgakov	Ambassador	1790	1792	
Jacob von Sievers	Ambassador	1793	1793	
Iosif Igelström	Ambassador	1793	1794	
Ivan Ash	Ambassador	1794	1795	

=== Soviet Union to the Republic of Poland (1921–1943) ===
Name	Title	Appointment	Termination	Notes
Lev Karakhan	Diplomatic Representative	30 May 1921	9 October 1922	
Leonid Obolensky	Diplomatic Representative	16 October 1922	16 October 1924	
Pyotr Voykov	Diplomatic Representative	16 October 1924	7 June 1927	
Aleksandr Ulyanov	Chargé d'affaires	7 June 1927	1927	
Dmitry Bogomolov	Diplomatic Representative	17 September 1927	1 December 1929	
Yuriy Kotsiubynsky	Chargé d'affaires	1 December 1929	30 January 1930	
Vladimir Antonov-Ovseyenko	Diplomatic Representative	3 January 1930	5 April 1934	
Yakov Davydov	Diplomatic Representative	5 April 1934	26 October 1937	
Pavel Listopad	Chargé d'affaires	1937	1939	
Nikolai Sharonov	Diplomatic Representative	1 June 1939	25 October 1939	
Invasion of Poland – Diplomatic relations interrupted (1939–1941)
Aleksandr Bogomolov	Ambassador	21 August 1941	25 April 1943	Representative to the Polish government-in-exile in London
Relations deteriorate over investigation of Soviet repressions of Polish citizens and Katyn massacre – Diplomatic relations interrupted (1943–1945)

=== Soviet Union to the Polish People's Republic (1945–1989) ===
Name	Title	Appointment	Termination	Notes
Viktor Lebedev	Ambassador	6 June 1945	2 March 1951	
Arkady Sobolev	Ambassador	2 March 1951	21 June 1953	
Georgy Popov	Ambassador	21 June 1953	27 March 1954	
Nikolai Mikhailov	Ambassador	27 March 1954	7 May 1955	
Panteleimon Ponomarenko	Ambassador	7 May 1955	3 October 1957	
Peter Abrassimov	Ambassador	3 October 1957	14 February 1961	
Averky Aristov	Ambassador	14 February 1961	10 March 1971	
Stanislav Pilotovich	Ambassador	10 March 1971	17 May 1978	
Boris Aristov	Ambassador	17 May 1978	11 July 1983	
Aleksandr Aksyonov	Ambassador	11 July 1983	3 January 1986	
Vladimir Brovikov	Ambassador	3 January 1986	December 1989	

=== Soviet Union to the Republic of Poland (1989–1991) ===
Name	Title	Appointment	Termination	Notes
Vladimir Brovikov	Ambassador	December 1989	8 May 1990	
Yury Kashlev	Ambassador	8 May 1990	25 December 1991	

=== Russian Federation to the Republic of Poland (1991–present) ===
Name	Title	Appointment	Termination	Notes
Yury Kashlev	Ambassador	25 December 1991	2 November 1996	
Leonid Drachevsky	Ambassador	2 November 1996	16 November 1998	
Sergey Razov	Ambassador	13 April 1999	23 February 2002	
Nikolay Afanasevsky	Ambassador	23 February 2002	23 June 2005	
Vladimir Grinin	Ambassador	21 April 2006	21 June 2010	
Aleksandr Alekseyev	Ambassador	21 June 2010	26 August 2014	
Sergey Andreyev	Ambassador	26 August 2014	2 December 2025	
Andrey Ordash	Chargé d'affaires	25 July 2025		

== See also ==
- List of ambassadors of Poland to Russia
