= List of ambassadors of the Soviet Union to Poland =

This is a list of ambassadors and envoys from the Soviet Union to Poland.

== Second Polish Republic ==
Second Polish Republic and the Soviet Union had established tentative diplomatic relations during the Polish–Soviet War (1919–1920) for the purpose of negotiation wartime treaties, but neither state had a stable diplomatic mission in the other country. Such missions were created in the aftermath of the Peace of Riga negotiations (March 1921). Formal relations were established on 27 April 1921.

For the next two years, Poland received representatives in a rank of an envoy from both the Russian SSR and the Ukrainian SSR.

- from 10 September 1921 to ?: Envoy Extraordinary and Minister Plenipotentiary Lev Karakhan for the Russian SSR
- from ? to ?, consecutively with Karakhan, Envoy Extraordinary and Minister Plenipotentiary Oleksandr Shumsky (Олександр Якович Шумський) for the Ukrainian SSR
- from 8 November 1922 to 13 December 1923: Envoy Extraordinary and Minister Plenipotentiary, Leonid Obolensky (Леонид Леонидович Оболенский)

On 23 July 1923, Poland recognized the creation of the Soviet Union, the representatives for Russian and Ukrainian SSRs were to be replaced by a single representative of the United SSR (USSR). Soviet representatives in the following years in the rank of an envoy consisted of:

- from 14 December 1923 to 14 October 1924 Leonid Obolensky officially took up the position of the USSR's Envoy Extraordinary and Minister Plenipotentiary in Poland
- from 8 November 1923 to 7 June 1927, Envoy Extraordinary and Minister Plenipotentiary Pyotr Voykov (assassinated)
- from 11 October 1927 to ? November 1929, Envoy Extraordinary and Minister Plenipotentiary Dmitry Bogomolov (Дмитрий Васильевич Богомолов)
- from 30 January 1930 to ? March 1934, Envoy Extraordinary and Minister Plenipotentiary Vladimir Antonov-Ovseenko

On 16 February 1930 the Soviet diplomatic mission in Poland was upgraded to the rank of an embassy. Soviet ambassadors in Poland consisted of:

- from 13 April 1930 to 1937, ambassador Yakov Davydov. He was recalled to Moscow in 1937 during the Great Purge and murdered. He was not replaced for about two years.
- from 2 June 1939 to 17 September 1939, ambassador Nikolai Sharonov. It is uncertain whether he was aware of the planned Soviet invasion of Poland. He left Poland on 11 or 12 September.

On 17 September 1939, when the Soviets invaded Poland, Soviet Union broke the diplomatic relations with Poland.

== Polish government in exile ==
On 30 July 1941 Polish-Soviet relations were reestablished following the Sikorski-Mayski Agreement.

- from November 1941 to 26 April 1943, Soviet ambassador to Polish government in exile was Aleksandr Bogomolov

Soviet Union again withdrew its recognition of the Polish government in exile after the Polish government requested investigation into the Katyn massacre.

== People's Republic of Poland ==
Soviet Union established official diplomatic relations with its own puppet Polish communist government, the Polish Committee of National Liberation, on 1 August 1944. On 5 January 1945 an official Soviet embassy was opened to the Provisional Government of the Republic of Poland. Soviet ambassadors in communist Poland (People's Republic of Poland) were:

- 1945–1951 – Viktor Lebedev (Виктор Захарович Лебедев)
- 1951–1953 – Arkady Sobolev (Аркадий Александрович Соболев)
- 1953–1954 – Georgy Popov (Георгий Михайлович Попов)
- 1954-1955 - Nikolai Mikhailov (Николай Александрович Михайлов)
- 1955–1957 – Panteleimon Ponomarenko (Пантелеймон Кондратьевич Пономаренко)
- 1957–1961 – Peter Abrassimov (Петр Андреевич Абрасимов)
- 1961–1971 – Averky Aristov (Аверкий Борисович Аристов)
- 1971–1978 – Stanislav Pilotovich (Станислав Антонович Пилотович)
- 1978–1983 – Boris Aristov (Борис Иванович Аристов)
- 1983–1986 – Aleksandr Aksyonov (Александр Никифорович Аксёнов)
- 1986–1990 – Vladimir Brovikov (Владимир Игнатьевич Бровиков)

== Third Polish Republic ==
Soviet ambassadors in non-communist Poland included:

- 1990–1991 – Yury Kashlev (Юрий Борисович Кашлев)

After the fall of Soviet Union, Soviet ambassadors were followed by the ambassadors from the post-Soviet states. See: List of ambassadors of Russia to Poland.
