= Tripartite Pact =

1940 World War II mutual defense treaty

Three-Power Pact Between Germany, Italy, and Japan, Signed at Berlin, September 27, 1940.
- Signing of the Tripartite Pact; On the left-hand side of the picture, seated from left to right, are Saburō Kurusu (representing Japan), Galeazzo Ciano (Italy) and Adolf Hitler (Germany).
- Type: Military alliance
- Signed: 27 September 1940
- Location: Berlin, Germany
- Signatories: Original German Reich Kingdom of Italy Empire of Japan; Subsequent Kingdom of Hungary Kingdom of Romania Slovak Republic Tsardom of Bulgaria Independent State of Croatia; Kingdom of Yugoslavia (for two days)

The Tripartite Pact, also known as the Berlin Pact, was an agreement between Germany, Italy, and Japan signed in Berlin on 27 September 1940 by, respectively, Joachim von Ribbentrop, Galeazzo Ciano, and Saburō Kurusu (in that order) and in the presence of Adolf Hitler. It was a defensive military alliance that was eventually joined by Hungary (20 November 1940), Romania (23 November 1940), Slovakia (24 November 1940), Bulgaria (1 March 1941), and Yugoslavia (25 March 1941). Yugoslavia's accession provoked a coup d'état in Belgrade two days later. Germany, Italy, and Hungary responded by invading Yugoslavia. The resulting Italo-German client state, known as the Independent State of Croatia, joined the pact on 15 June 1941.

The Tripartite Pact was, together with the Anti-Comintern Pact and the Pact of Steel, one of a number of agreements between Germany, Japan, Italy, and other countries of the Axis powers governing their relationship.

The Tripartite Pact formally allied the Axis Powers with one another, and it was directed primarily at the United States. Because of the long distance between Japan and the two European Powers, the pact recognized two different regions that were to be under Axis rule. Japan recognized "the leadership of Germany and Italy in the establishment of a new order in Europe". In return, Germany and Italy recognized Japan's right to establish a new order "in Greater East Asia". But the pact's practical effects were limited since the Italo-German and Japanese operational theatres were on opposite sides of the world, and the high contracting powers had disparate strategic interests. As such, the Axis was only ever a loose alliance. Its defensive clauses were never invoked, and signing the agreement did not oblige its signatories to fight a common war per se.

== Text ==
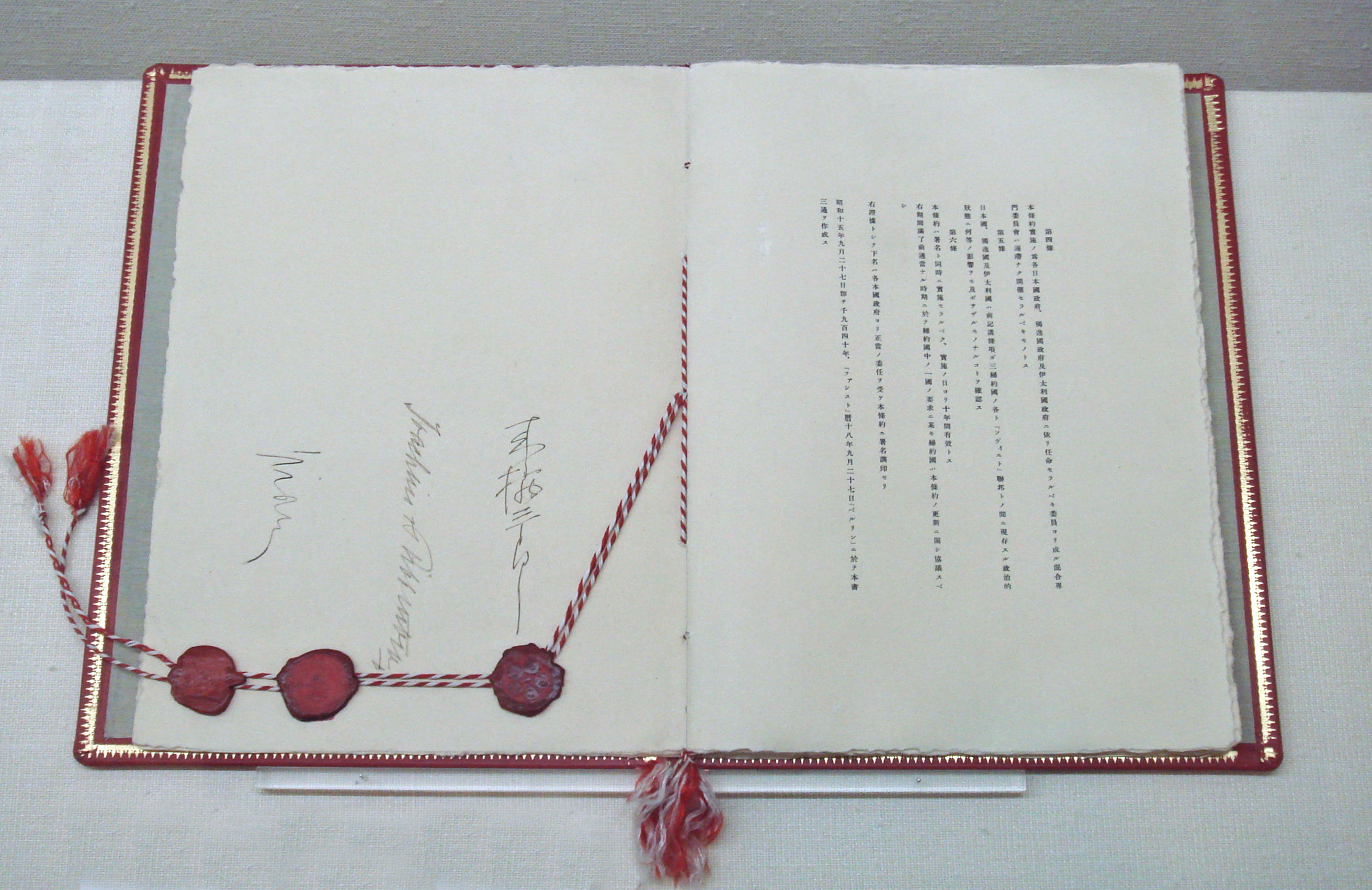
Japanese version of the Tripartite Pact, 27 September 1940

The Governments of Japan, Germany, and Italy consider it as the condition precedent of any lasting peace that all nations in the world be given each its own proper place, have decided to stand by and co-operate with one another in their efforts in Greater East Asia and the regions of Europe respectively wherein it is their prime purpose to establish and maintain a new order of things, calculated to promote the mutual prosperity and welfare of the peoples concerned. It is, furthermore, the desire of the three Governments to extend cooperation to nations in other spheres of the world that are inclined to direct their efforts along lines similar to their own for the purpose of realizing their ultimate object, world peace. Accordingly, the Governments of Japan, Germany and Italy have agreed as follows:

ARTICLE 1. Japan recognizes and respects the leadership of Germany and Italy in the establishment of a new order in Europe.

ARTICLE 2. Germany and Italy recognize and respect the leadership of Japan in the establishment of a new order in Greater East Asia.

ARTICLE 3. Japan, Germany, and Italy agree to cooperate in their efforts on aforesaid lines. They further undertake to assist one another with all political, economic and military means if one of the Contracting Powers is attacked by a Power at present not involved in the European War or in the Japanese-Chinese conflict.

ARTICLE 4. With a view to implementing the present pact, joint technical commissions, to be appointed by the respective Governments of Japan, Germany and Italy, will meet without delay.

ARTICLE 5. Japan, Germany and Italy affirm that the above agreement affects in no way the political status existing at present between each of the three Contracting Powers and Soviet Russia.

ARTICLE 6. The present pact shall become valid immediately upon signature and shall remain in force ten years from the date on which it becomes effective. In due time, before the expiration of said term, the High Contracting Parties shall, at the request of any one of them, enter into negotiations for its renewal.

In faith whereof, the undersigned duly authorized by their respective governments have signed this pact and have affixed hereto their signatures.

Done in triplicate at Berlin, the 27th day of September, 1940, in the 19th year of the fascist era, corresponding to the 27th day of the ninth month of the 15th year of Showa (the reign of Emperor Hirohito).

== Background ==
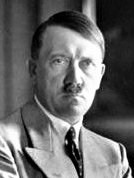
Adolf Hitler

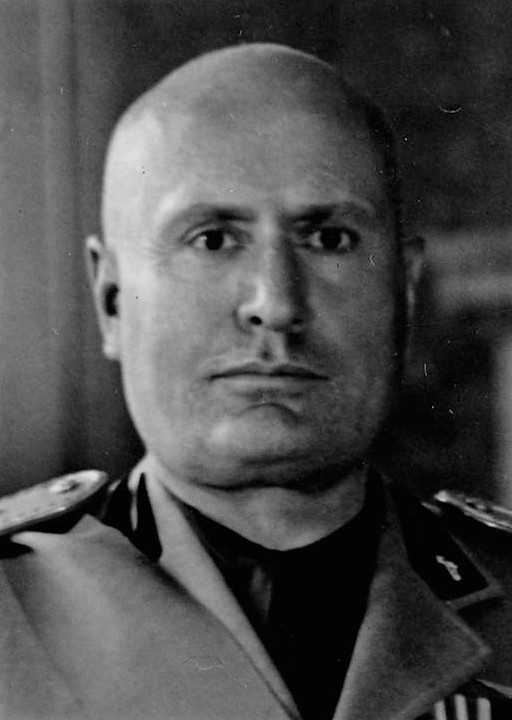
Benito Mussolini

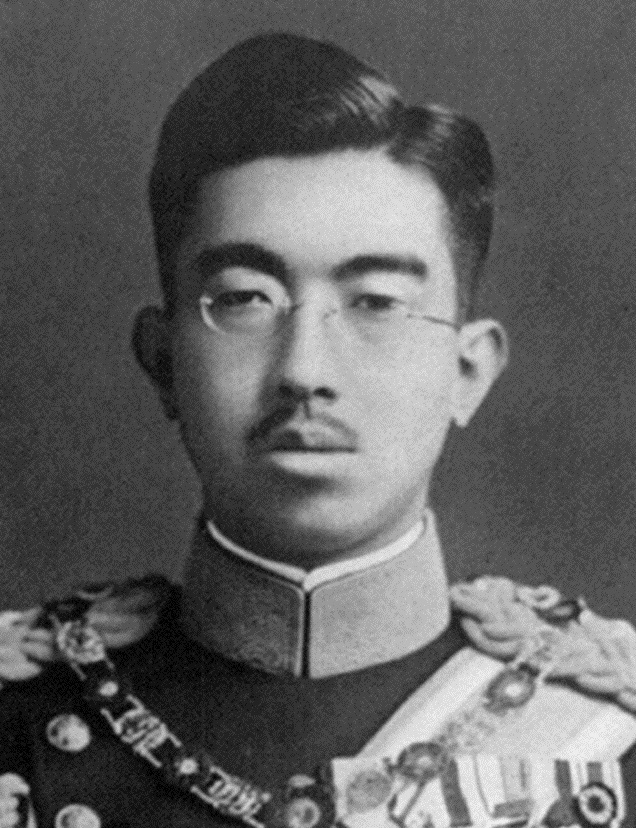
Emperor Shōwa

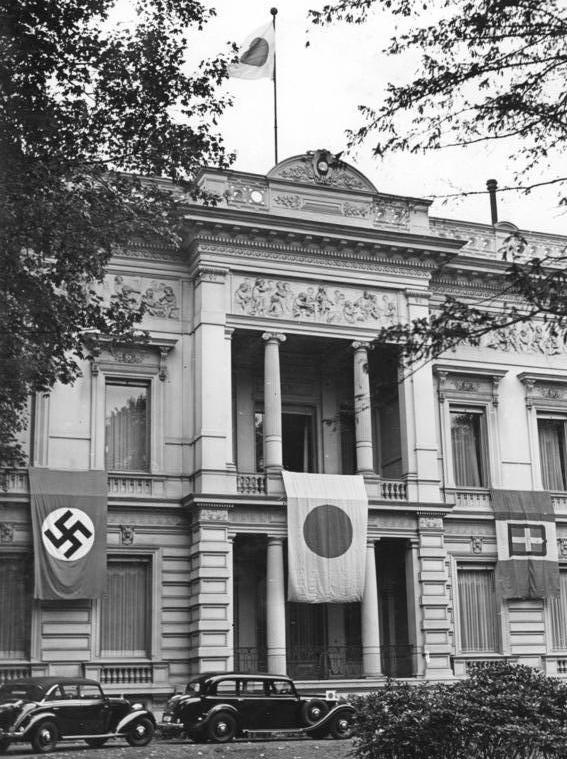
The Japanese embassy in Berlin clad in the flags of the three signatories of the Tripartite Pact in September 1940

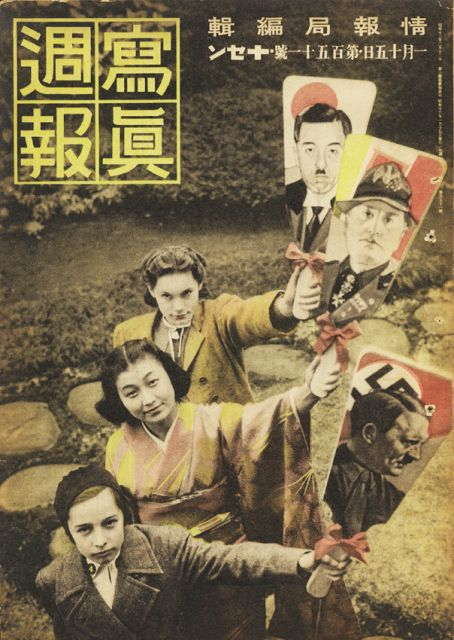
Japanese magazine published by the Cabinet Intelligence Bureau on 15 January 1941, advertising the Tripartite Pact

Although Germany and Japan technically became allies with the signing of Anti-Comintern Pact of 1936, the 1939 Molotov–Ribbentrop Pact between Germany and the Soviet Union came as a surprise to Japan. In November 1939, Germany and Japan signed the "Agreement for Cultural Cooperation between Japan and Germany", which restored the "reluctant alliance" between them.

== Later signatories ==
In a ceremonial speech following the signing of the pact on 27 September, Ribbentrop may have suggested that the signatories were open to accepting new signatories in the future. The Deutsche Allgemeine Zeitung (DAZ) reported his words as follows:

The purpose of the Pact is, above all things, to help restore peace to the world as quickly as possible. Therefore any other State which wishes to accede to this bloc (der diesem Block beitreten will), with the intention of contributing to the restoration of peaceful conditions, will be sincerely and gratefully made welcome and will participate in the economic and political reorganisation.

The official Deutsches Nachrichtenbüro (DNB), however, as well as most of the press, reported a slightly different version in which the words "having good will towards the pact" (der diesem Pakt wohlwollend gegenübertreten will) instead of "accede to" were used. It is likely that other nations were not envisioned to join the treaty and that Ribbentrop misspoke. The official record in the DNB, therefore, corrected his words to remove any reference to "accession" by other states but produced an awkward wording in the process.

The Italian foreign minister, Ciano, was resolutely opposed to the idea of adding smaller states to the pact as late as 20 November 1940; he argued in his diary that they weakened the pact and were useless bits of diplomacy.

=== Hungary ===
The Kingdom of Hungary was the fourth state to sign the pact and the first to join it after 27 September 1940. The Hungarian ambassador in Berlin, Döme Sztójay, telegraphed his foreign minister, István Csáky, immediately after news of the signing and of Ribbentrop's speech had reached him. He urged Csáky to join the pact and even claimed that it was the expectation of Germany and Italy that he would do so. He considered it especially important for Hungary to sign the pact before Romania did. In response, Csáky asked Sztójay and the ambassador in Rome, Frigyes Villani, to make enquiries regarding Hungary's accession and its potential obligations under the pact. On 28 September, the German secretary of state for foreign affairs, Ernst von Weizsäcker, informed Hungary that Ribbentrop had meant not a "formal accession" but merely "an attitude in the spirit of the Pact". The Italian answer was similar. Nonetheless, within a week, the Hungarian government had sent out formal notice of its "spiritual adherence" to the pact.

In the week after Hungary's "spiritual adherence", the Balkan situation changed. Romania granted a German request to send troops to guard the Ploiești oil fields, and Hungary granted a German request to allow its troops to transit Hungary to get to Romania. On 7 October 1940, the first German troops arrived in Ploiești. It is probable that Romania's accession to the pact had been delayed until the German troops were in place for fear of the Soviets taking pre-emptive action to secure the oil fields for themselves. In turn, Hungary's accession had been delayed until Romania's had been negotiated. On about 9 October, Weizsäcker delivered a message from Ribbentrop to Sztójay to inform him that Hitler now wanted "friendly states" to join the pact. In a telephone conversation with Ciano on 9 or 10 October, Ribbentrop claimed that Hungary had sent a second request to join the pact. Mussolini reluctantly consented. On 12 October, Ribbentrop informed Sztójay that both Italy and Japan had consented to Hungary's accession. Since the Hungarian regent, Miklós Horthy, had specifically instructed Sztójay to ask for Hungary to be the first new state to accede to the pact, Ribbentrop granted the request.

=== Romania ===
The Kingdom of Romania had joined the Allied Powers in World War I and had received Transylvania from Austria-Hungary. After Germany and Italy awarded parts of Transylvania back to Hungary and Southern Dobruja back to Bulgaria and after the Soviet Union had taken Bessarabia and northern Bukovina, the Fascist Iron Guard party came to power and Romania joined the Tripartite Pact on November 23, 1940, because of the Romanian desire for protection against the Soviet Union.

In Marshal Ion Antonescu's affidavit read out at the IG Farben Trial (1947–1948), he stated that the agreement on entering the pact had been concluded before his visit to Berlin on 22 November 1940.

=== Slovakia ===
On 14 March 1939, the Slovak Republic was declared in the midst of the dismemberment of Czechoslovakia. Hitler invited Monsignor Jozef Tiso to be the new nation's leader. Soon after it was formed, Slovakia was involved in a war with neighboring Hungary. Slovakia had signed a "Protection Treaty" with Germany, which, however, refused to intervene. The war resulted in territorial gains by Hungary at Slovakia's expense. Even so, Slovakia supported the German invasion of Poland in 1939.

Shortly after the signing of the Tripartite Pact, Slovakia, following the Hungarian lead, sent messages of "spiritual adherence" to Germany and Italy.

On 24 November 1940, the day after Romania signed the pact, the Slovak prime minister and foreign minister, Vojtech Tuka, went to Berlin to meet Ribbentrop and signed Slovakia's accession to the Tripartite Pact. His purpose was to increase Tuka's standing in Slovakia relative to that of his rival, Tiso, although the Germans had no intention of permitting Tiso to be removed.

=== Bulgaria ===
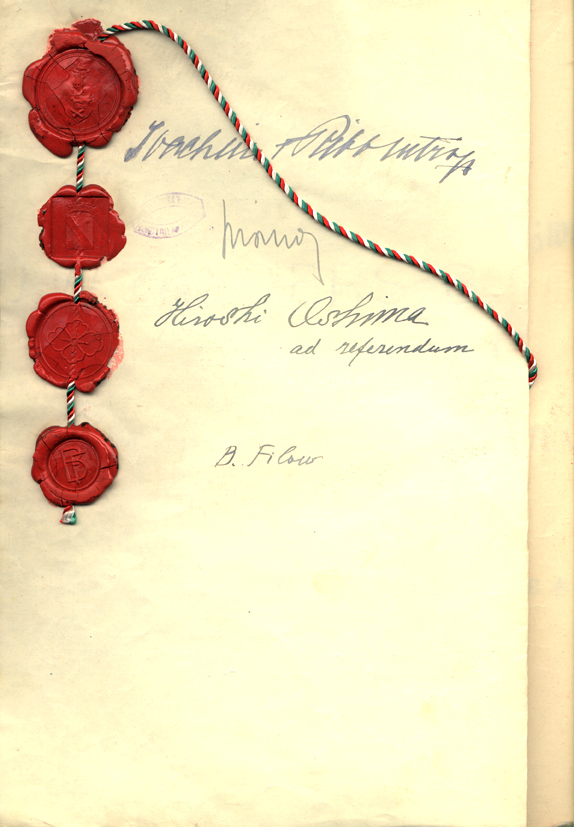
Official protocol of Bulgaria's accession into the Tripartite Pact

The Tsardom of Bulgaria had been an ally of Germany and on the losing side in World War I. From the beginning, the Germans pressured Bulgaria to join the Tripartite Pact. On 17 November 1940, Tsar Boris III and Foreign Minister Ivan Popov met with Hitler in Germany. According to Hermann Neubacher, Germany's special envoy to the Balkans, Bulgaria's relation to the Axis powers was completely settled at that meeting. On 23 November, however, the Bulgarian ambassador in Berlin, Peter Draganov, informed the Germans that while Bulgaria had agreed in principle to join the pact, it wished to delay its signing for the time being.

The meeting with Hitler precipitated a visit to Bulgaria by the Soviet diplomat Arkady Sobolev on 25 November. He encouraged the Bulgarians to sign a mutual assistance pact that had first been discussed in October 1939. He offered Soviet recognition of Bulgarian claims in Greece and Turkey. The Bulgarian government, however, was disturbed by the subversive actions of the Bulgarian Communist Party in response to the talks, apparently at the Soviets' urging.

On 26 December 1940, the far-right politician Alexander Tsankov introduced a motion in the National Assembly urging the government to accede to the Tripartite Pact immediately, but it was voted down.

Bulgaria's hand was finally forced by Germany's desire to intervene in the Italo-Greek War, which would require moving troops through Bulgaria. With no possibility of resisting Germany militarily, Prime Minister Bogdan Filov signed Bulgaria's accession to the pact in Vienna on 1 March 1941. He announced that it was done partly in gratitude for Germany's assistance to Bulgaria in obtaining the Treaty of Craiova with Romania and that it would not affect Bulgaria's relations with Turkey or the Soviet Union. Later that day, Ribbentrop promised Filov that after the fall of Greece, Bulgaria would obtain an Aegean coastline between the Struma and Maritsa Rivers.

According to Article 17 of the Tarnovo Constitution, treaties had to be ratified by the National Assembly. In the case of the Tripartite Pact, the government sought to have the treaty ratified without debate or discussion. Seventeen opposition deputies submitted an interpellation and one, Ivan Petrov, asked why the National Assembly had not been consulted in advance and whether the pact involved Bulgaria in war. They were ignored. The pact was ratified by a vote of 140 to 20.

=== Yugoslavia ===
On 25 March 1941 in Vienna, Dragiša Cvetković, the prime minister of the Kingdom of Yugoslavia, signed the Tripartite Pact. On 27 March, the regime was overthrown in a military coup d'état with British support. Seventeen-year-old King Peter II was declared to be of age. The new Yugoslav government under Prime Minister and General Dušan Simović, refused to ratify Yugoslavia's signing of the Tripartite Pact and started negotiations with the United Kingdom and the Soviet Union. The enraged Hitler issued Directive 25 as an answer to the coup and then attacked both Yugoslavia and Greece on 6 April. The German Air Force bombed Belgrade for three days and nights. German ground troops moved in, and Yugoslavia capitulated on 17 April.

=== Independent State of Croatia ===
The Independent State of Croatia (Nezavisna Država Hrvatska, or NDH), a puppet state created from some former territories of the conquered Yugoslavia, signed the Tripartite Pact on 15 June 1941.

== Potential signatories ==
=== Soviet Union ===
Just prior to the formation of the Tripartite Pact, the Soviet Union was informed of its existence and the potential of its joining. Vyacheslav Molotov was thus sent to Berlin to discuss the pact and the possibility of the Soviet Union joining. The Soviets considered joining the Tripartite Pact to be an update of existing agreements with Germany. During the visit to Berlin, Molotov agreed in principle to the Soviet Union joining the pact if some details, such as Soviet annexation of Finland, could be worked out. The Soviet government sent a revised version of the pact to Germany on 25 November. To demonstrate the benefits of partnership, the Soviet Union made large economic offerings to Germany.

However, the Germans had no intention of allowing the Soviets to join the pact; they were already making preparations for their invasion of the Soviet Union, and were committed to doing so regardless of any action taken by the Soviets:

Political conversations designed to clarify the attitude of Russia in the immediate future have been started. Regardless of the outcome of these conversations, all preparations for the East previously ordered orally are to be continued. [Written] directives on that will follow as soon as the basic elements of the army's plan for the operation have been submitted to me and approved by me. —Adolf Hitler

When they received the Soviet proposal in November, they simply did not reply. They, however, accepted the new economic offerings and signed an agreement for them on 10 January 1941.

=== Finland ===
Military co-operation between Finland and Nazi Germany started in late 1940 after Finland had lost a significant amount of its territory to Soviet aggression during the Winter War. Finland joined Operation Barbarossa on 25 June 1941, which started the Continuation War. In November, Finland signed the Anti-Comintern Pact, an anticommunist agreement directed against the Soviet Union, with many other countries allied with Germany. Soon, Germany suggested for Finland to sign the Tripartite Pact, but the Finnish government refused since Finland saw its war as a "separate war" from the Second World War and saw its objectives as different from those of Nazi Germany. Finland also wanted to maintain diplomatic relations with the Allies, particularly the United States. During the Second World War, Germany asked Finland several times to sign the pact but the Finnish government declined all offers. Diplomatic relations between Finland and the United States were maintained until June 1944 although the US ambassador had already been recalled. After Finland allied with Germany, the United Kingdom declared war on Finland on 5 December 1941.

At the request of the German command, the Finns established a winter warfare school in Kankaanpää. It began its first two-month course for German officers and non-commissioned officers in December 1941. In the summer of 1942, the German-speaking Finnish instructors taught a course on forest warfare. General Waldemar Erfurth, the German liaison to the Finnish general headquarters, considered the school an outstanding success. It was also attended by some Hungarian officers.

=== Thailand ===
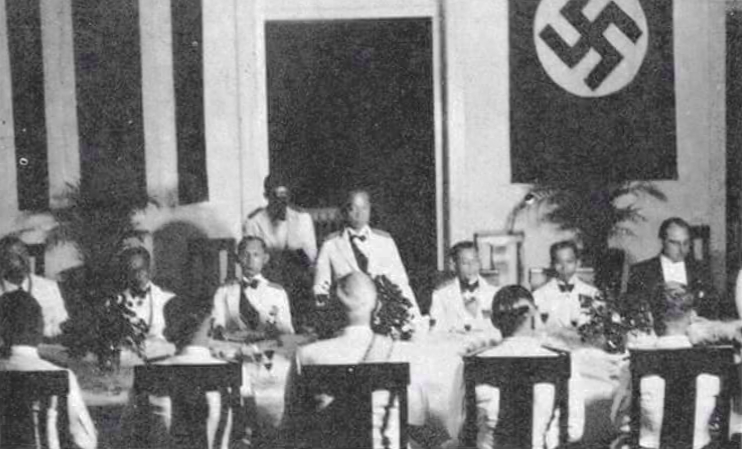
Luang Wichitwathakan (centre, standing) and German diplomats, 1943

Japan invaded Thailand at 02:00 local time on 8 December 1941. The Japanese ambassador, Teiji Tsubokami, told the Thai foreign minister, Direk Jayanama, that Japan wanted only permission for its troops to pass through Thailand to attack the British in Malaya and Burma. At 07:00, Prime Minister Plaek Phibunsongkhram (Phibun) held an emergency cabinet meeting in Bangkok, and soon, a ceasefire was ordered. Phibun then met with Tsubokami, who offered him four options: to conclude a defensive–offensive alliance with Japan, to join the Tripartite Pact, to co-operate in Japanese military operations, or to agree to the joint defence of Thailand. Military co-operation was chosen, and the Tripartite Pact was rejected.

According to the postwar memoirs of Direk Jayanama, Phibun planned to sign the pact later but was prevented by Direk's opposition.

== Tripartite relations, 1940–1943 ==
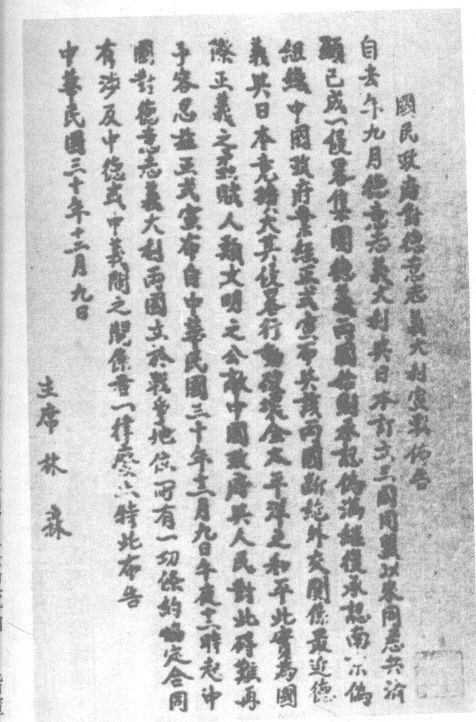
China's declaration of war (9 December 1941) was made on the grounds that the Tripartite Pact banded the allies together "into a block of aggressor states working closely together to carry out their common program of world conquest and domination".

The "joint technical commissions" required by the pact were established by agreement on 20 December 1940. They were to consist of a general commission in each capital, consisting of the host's foreign minister and the other two partners' ambassadors. Under the general commission were to be military and economic commissions. On 15 December 1941, the first meeting of all three commissions in one capital, Berlin, took place, labelled a "Tripartite Pact Conference". It was decided there to form a "Permanent Council of the Tripartite Pact Powers", but nothing happened for two months. Only the Italians, whom the Japanese mistrusted, pushed for greater collaboration.

On 18 January 1942, the German and Italian governments signed two secret operational agreements: one with the Imperial Japanese Army and another with the Imperial Japanese Navy. The agreements divided the world along longitude 70° east into two major operational zones, but it had almost no military significance. Chiefly, it committed the powers to co-operation in matters of commerce, intelligence and communication.

On 24 February 1942, the Permanent Council met under the chairmanship of Ribbentrop, who announced that "the propaganda effect is one of the main reasons for our meetings". The representatives set up a propaganda commission and then adjourned indefinitely. The military commission in Berlin met only two or three times by 1943, and there were no trilateral naval talks at all. Germany and Japan conducted separate naval discussions, and Italy consulted the Japanese independently for its planned assault on Malta in 1942.

The economic relationship between the Tripartite powers was fraught with difficulty. Japan would not grant economic concessions to Germany in 1941 for fear of them ruining its negotiations with the United States. In January 1942, negotiations on economic co-operation began, but an agreement was not signed until 20 January 1943 in Berlin. Italy was invited to sign a similar agreement in Rome at the same time for propaganda purposes, but none of the supplementary Berlin protocols applied to Italo-Japanese relations.

== "No separate peace" agreement ==
Japan first pressed Germany to join the war with the United States on 2 December 1941, only two days after notifying Berlin of its intention to go to war. Receiving no response, Japan approached Italy. At 04:00 on the morning of 5 December, Ribbentrop gave the Japanese ambassador a proposal, which had been approved by Italy, to join the war and to prosecute it jointly. On 11 December 1941, the same day as the German declaration of war on the United States and the Italian declaration, the three powers signed an agreement, already hammered out on 8 December, barring any separate peace with the United States or Britain. It was "intended as a propaganda accompaniment to the declaration of war".

ARTICLE I. Italy, Germany and Japan will henceforth conduct in common and jointly a war which has been imposed on them by the United States of America and England, by all means at their disposal and until the end of hostilities.

ARTICLE II. Italy, Germany and Japan undertake each for himself that none of the parties to the present accord will conclude either armistice or peace, be it with the United States or with England without complete and reciprocal agreement [of the three signatories to this pact].

ARTICLE III. Italy, Germany and Japan, even after the victorious conclusion of this war, will collaborate closely in the spirit of the Tripartite Pact, concluded Sept. 21, 1940, in order to realize and establish an equitable new order in the world.

ARTICLE IV. The present accord is effective immediately on its signature and remains in force for the duration of the Tripartite Pact, signed Sept. 27, 1940. The high contracting parties of this accord will at an opportune moment agree among themselves the means of implementing Article III above of this accord.

== Legacy ==
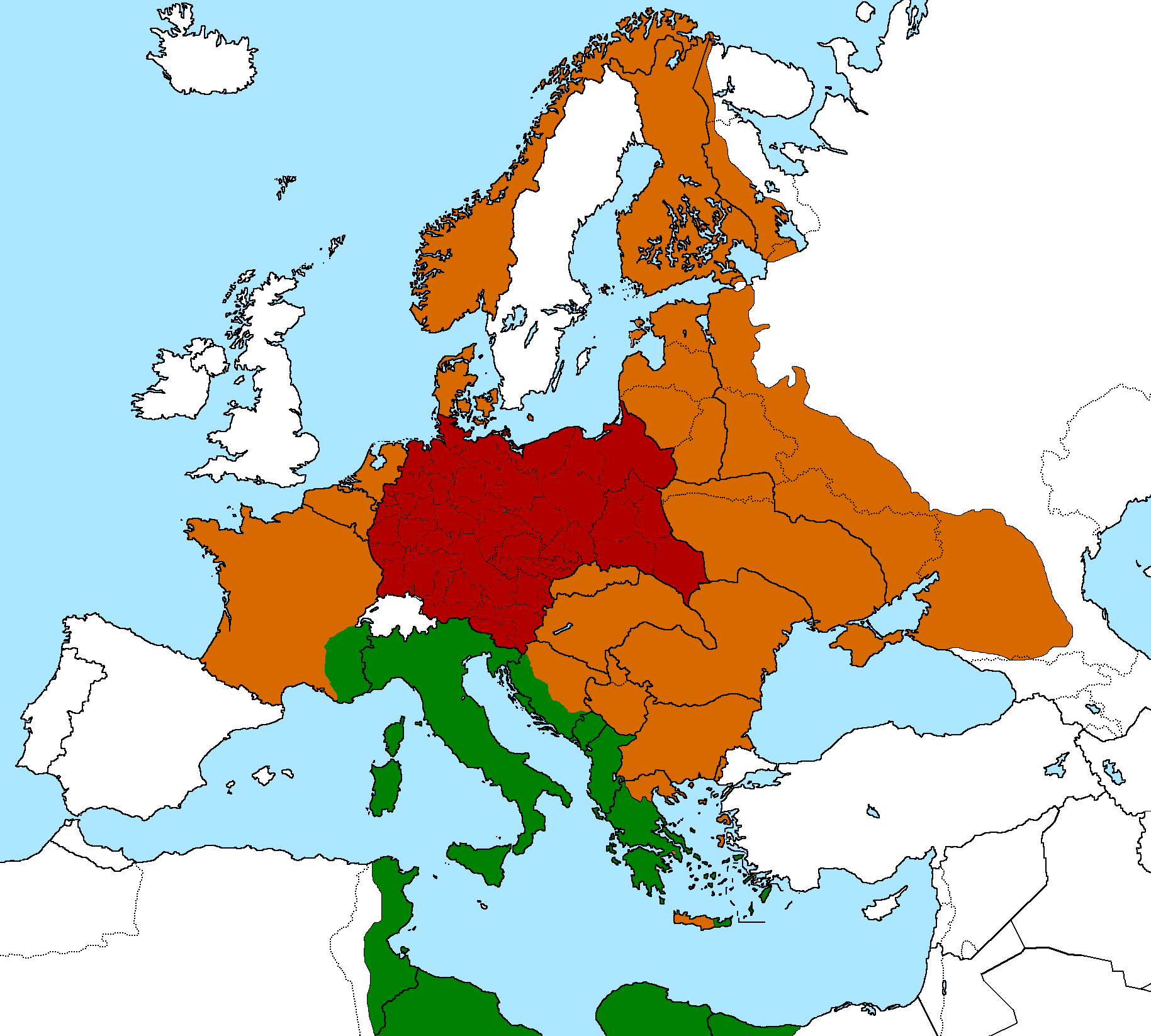
The main legacy in Europe: the German Reich (red), its occupied territories (brown), and Greater Italy (green) in 1942

As the defensive alliance under the pact was never invoked, and as the main signatories were widely separated between Europe and Asia limiting co-operation between the European and Asian signatories, the impact of the Pact was limited. The historian Paul W. Schroeder has described it as rapidly declining from a "position of importance in late 1940 to one of merely nominal existence in late 1941" and as "virtually inoperative" by December 1941.

Despite its limited practical impact, the Tripartite Pact had significant symbolic implications, particularly in influencing American perceptions. It persuaded the American public that Japan was acting in concert with Germany, which played into broader narratives of a coordinated Axis effort to dominate globally. The charge that the Pact was part of an effort to co-ordinate aggression and achieve world domination also formed part of the case brought against the Nazi leaders at Nuremberg.

Similarly the Tokyo War Crimes Trials also focused on the establishing of mixed technical commissions between Germany, Japan, and Italy as evidence that the Pact began functioning shortly after it was signed, and showed mutual support in aggression under the pact, though these commissions never actually functioned. Moreover, the Pact's ideological underpinnings, rooted in global fascism and the aggressive ambitions for a new world order by its signatories, underscored the broader Axis strategy against the Allies.

It contributed to the legal and moral frameworks within which the Axis powers' actions were judged post-war, highlighting the complex legacy of wartime alliances not just in terms of their immediate strategic impacts, but also in terms of their longer-term effects on international relations and legal precedents for addressing acts of aggression.

== Sources ==
- Christian Goeschel: Performing the New Order: The Tripartite Pact, 1940–1945., Cambridge University Press, 13 July 2022
- Bán, András D. (2004). Hungarian–British Diplomacy, 1938–1941: The Attempt to Maintain Relations. Translated by Tim Wilkinson. London: Frank Cass. ISBN 0714656607.
- Chinvanno, Anuson (1992). Thailand's Policies towards China, 1949–54. Macmillan.
- Flood, E. Thadeus (1970). "Review of Thailand and the Second World War by Direk Chayanam". The Journal of Asian Studies. 29 (4): 988–990. doi:10.2307/2943163. JSTOR 2943163. S2CID 163548311.
- Boog, Horst; Rahn, Werner; Stumpf, Reinhard; et al., eds. (2001). Germany and the Second World War, Volume 6: The Global War. Oxford University Press. ISBN 978-0191606847.
- DiNardo, R. L. (1996). "The Dysfunctional Coalition: The Axis Powers and the Eastern Front in World War II". The Journal of Military History. 60 (4): 711–730. doi:10.2307/2944662. JSTOR 2944662.
- Giurescu, Dinu C. (2000). Romania in the Second World War (1939–1945). Boulder, CO: East European Monographs.
- Gusso, Massimo (2022). Italia e Giappone: dal Patto Anticomintern alla dichiarazione di guerra del luglio 1945. Inquiete convergenze, geopolitica, diplomazia, conflitti globali e drammi individuali (1934–1952). Edizioni Ca’ Foscari, Venice.
- Jelínek, Yeshayahu (1971). "Slovakia's Internal Policy and the Third Reich, August 1940 – February 1941". Central European History. 4 (3): 242–270. doi:10.1017/s0008938900015363. S2CID 145451318.
- Kolanović, Nada Kisić (2006). "The NDH's Relations with Southeast European Countries, Turkey and Japan, 1941–45". Totalitarian Movements and Political Religions. 7 (4): 473–492. doi:10.1080/14690760600963248. S2CID 144204223.
- Macartney, C. A. (1956). October Fifteenth: A History of Modern Hungary, 1929–1945. vol. 1. Edinburgh: Edinburgh University Press.
- Miller, Marshall Lee (1975). Bulgaria during the Second World War. Stanford, CA: Stanford University Press.
- Schroeder, Paul W. (1958). The Axis Alliance and Japanese-American Relations, 1941. Cornell University Press. ISBN 0801403715.
- Weinberg, Gerhard L. (1994). A World at Arms: A Global History of World War II. Cambridge University Press. ISBN 978-0-521-61826-7.
