= Ivan Rumyantsev =

Soviet politician (1913–1992)

- Иван Румянцев

First Secretary of the Moscow City Party Committee
- In office 25 January 1950 – July 1952
- Preceded by: Georgy Popov
- Succeeded by: Ivan Kapitonov

Personal details
- Born: 22 October 1913 Bogorodsk, Russian Empire
- Died: 6 October 1992 (aged 78) Moscow, Soviet Union
- Resting place: Vagankovo Cemetery
- Party: Communist Party of the Soviet Union
- Education: Moscow Teachers' College; Higher Party School

Ivan Ivanovich Rumyantsev (Russian: Иван Иванович Румянцев; October 22 (November 4), 1913, Bogorodsk, Moscow Governorate – October 6, 1992, Moscow) was a Soviet politician, a member of the Communist Party of the Soviet Union from 1932. He was awarded a number of state awards, among them Hero of Socialist Labor (1984).

== Biography ==
Born into a family of farmers. He graduated from the Moscow Aviation Technical School (1934), the Higher Party School (1948, by correspondence), and the Moscow Teachers' Institute (1949, as an external student).

From 1930 to 1941, he was a foreman, planner, and senior dispatcher at the Frunze Plant (Moscow). From 1941 to 1943, he was commissar of the Evacuation Headquarters, deputy secretary, and secretary of the party committee of the Frunze Plant. From 1943 to 1946, he was an instructor in the Aviation Industry Department of the Moscow City Party Committee and a party organizer at a plant.

From 1946 to 1950, he was the First Secretary of the Leningrad District Committee of the Communist Party of the Soviet Union.

With Popov's dismissal as First Secretary of the Moscow City Committee and the Moscow Oblast Committee, and Khrushchev's election as First Secretary of the Moscow Oblast Committee, Rumyantsev was elected to the post of First Secretary of the Moscow City Committee.

From January 25, 1950, to July 1952, he was the First Secretary of the Moscow City Party Committee. He was succeeded as First Secretary of the Moscow City Committee by Ivan Kapitonov, who had previously served as the Second Secretary of the Moscow Oblast Committee under First Secretary Nikita Khrushchev since the fall of 1951.

Aleksei Adzhubei wrote in his memoir Those Ten Years: "Khrushchev was elected Secretary of the Central Committee and First Secretary of the Moscow City Committee. He was to exercise overall leadership of the region and the city. The current affairs of the City Committee were handled by the Secretary of the Moscow City Committee, Ivan Ivanovich Rumyantsev, an aeronautical engineer, still a young man, charming and energetic. He had a good relationship with Nikita Sergeyevich... I. I. Rumyantsev disappeared instantly. I can only assert that his disappearance had nothing to do with Khrushchev's attitude toward him, but was decided somewhere higher up. Anything could happen during such sudden actions. Ivan Ivanovich was lucky. He returned as director to the aircraft plant, where he had worked before joining the Party...".

From 1952 to 1963, he served as deputy director and director of an aircraft plant (Moscow).

From 1963 to 1986, he was director of the Znamya Revolyutsii Moscow Machine-Building Plant.

He is buried at the Vagankovo Cemetery.

== Memorial ==
The former MMZ "Znamya Revolyutsii" (Banner of the Revolution) bears his name; a bust of him is erected on the grounds.

A memorial plaque is located on the building of the Novy Svet boarding house in Crimea.

The "Union of Aircraft Engine Building" Association declared 2013 the Year of Rumyantsev.

German Zotov mentions Rumyantsev in his memoirs.
