= First Secretary of the Moscow City Committee of the Communist Party of the Soviet Union =

Political position

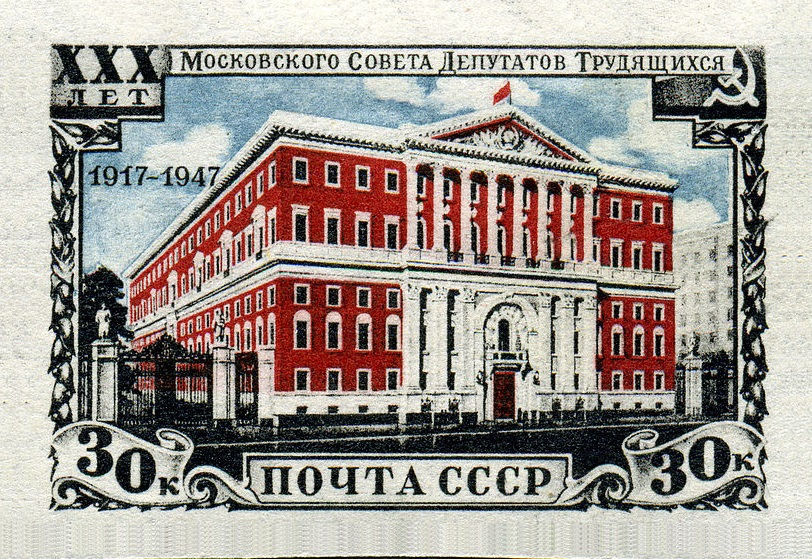
Office of the First Secretary on Tverskaya Street, depicted on a 1947 stamp

The First Secretary of the Moscow City Committee of the Communist Party of the Soviet Union was the position of highest authority in the city of Moscow, roughly equating to that of mayor. The position was created on November 10, 1917, following the October Revolution, and abolished on August 24, 1991. The First Secretary was a de facto appointed position, usually by the Politburo or the General Secretary himself. Until the abolition of the CPSU monopoly on power on March 14, 1990, he had actual power in Moscow.

== First Secretaries ==
Name	Term of office		Life years
Name	Start	End	Life years
Vadim Podbelskiy	10 November 1917	12 April 1918	1887–1920
Dominik Yefremov	12 April 1918	7 September 1918	1883–1925
Vladimir Zagorsky	17 September 1918	25 September 1919	1883–1919
Dominik Yefremov	October 1919	November 1919	1883–1925
Alexander Myasnakov	November 1919	April 1920	1886–1925
Osip Piatnitsky	April 1920	November 1920	1882–1938
Fedor Sergeyev (Artem)	November 1920	March 1921	1883–1921
Isaak Zelensky	March 1921	20 August 1924	1890–1938
Nikolai Uglanov	20 August 1924	27 November 1928	1886–1937
Vyacheslav Molotov	27 November 1928	15 August 1929	1890–1986
Karl Bauman	15 August 1929	12 July 1930	1892–1937
Lazar Kaganovich	12 July 1930	January 1934	1893–1991
Nikita Khrushchev	January 1934	27 January 1938	1894–1971
Aleksandr Ugarov	11 February 1938	19 September 1938	1900–1939
Aleksandr Shcherbakov	2 December 1938	10 May 1945	1901–1945
Georgy Popov	10 May 1945	12 February 1950	1906–1968
Ivan Rumyantsev	12 February 1950	July 1952	1913–1992
Ivan Kapitonov	August 1952	29 March 1954	1915–2002
Yekaterina Furtseva	17 November 1954	30 June 1957	1910–1974
Vladimir Ustinov	30 June 1957	4 March 1960	1907–1971
Pyotr Demichev	4 March 1960	1 November 1962	1917–2010
Nikolai Yegorychev	1 November 1962	4 October 1967	1920–2005
Viktor Grishin	4 October 1967	23 December 1985	1914–1992
Boris Yeltsin	23 December 1985	11 November 1987	1931–2007
Lev Zaykov	11 November 1987	21 November 1989	1923–2002
Yuri Prokofyev	21 November 1989	24 August 1991	1939–

== See also ==
- Mayor of Moscow
- Moscow Regional Committee of the Communist Party of the Soviet Union

== Sources ==
- World Statesmen.org
