= Mikhail Kovalev (politician) =

Belarusian politician

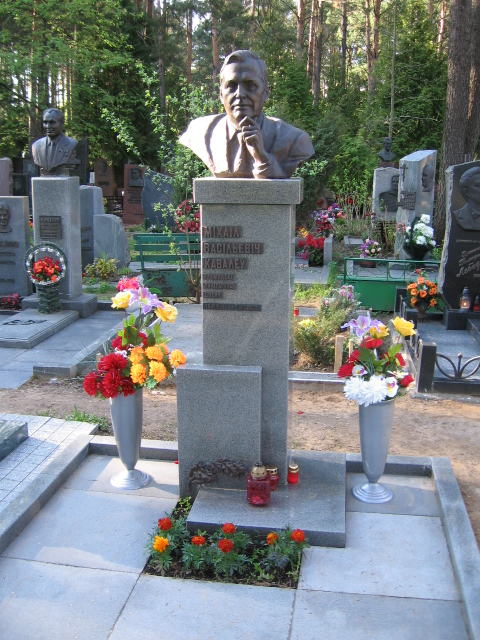
Grave of Mikhail Kovalev

Mikhail Vasilyevich Kovalev (Belarusian: Міхаіл Васілевіч Кавалёў; 16 August 1925 – 5 July 2007) was the Chairman of the Council of Ministers of Byelorussian Soviet Socialist Republic from 10 January 1986 to 7 April 1990. He led the BSSR when the Chernobyl disaster happened in neighboring Ukraine. He was preceded by Vladimir Brovikov and succeeded by Vyacheslav Kebich, who then served as the first Prime Minister of independent Belarus.

He was born on 16 August 1925 in Dubrovytsia, Klimovichi district, Mogilev. Kovalev fought during World War II with the Red Army.

In 1954, he graduated from the Leningrad Mining Institute. He participated in the Great Patriotic War, was wounded twice. After 1948 he worked at the Minsk Engine Plant. From 1954 - 1962 he was master, foreman, chief of construction management, and head of building trust No. 1 in Minsk. From 1962 - 1966 he was head of the Construction Department and head of the construction trust No. 3 in Soligorsk.

He became the Deputy Minister of Construction of the BSSR in 1966. From 1967 to 1977 he was Chairman of the Minsk City Executive Committee. From 1977 to 1978 he was First Deputy Chairman of the State Planning Committee of the BSSR. He then served as the first deputy chairman of the Council of Ministers of the Byelorussian SSR.

He died on 5 July 2007 in Minsk, and was buried in Minsk Eastern Cemetery.
