= Boris Kowerda =

Russian editor

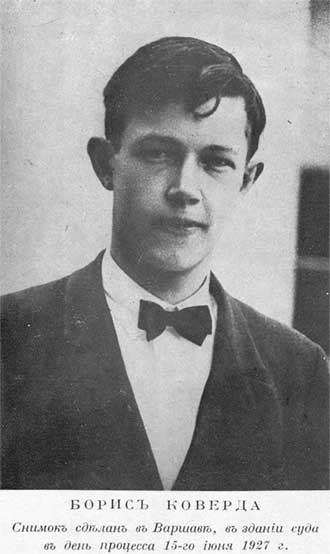
- Born: 21 August 1907; Vilnius, Russian Empire
- Died: 18 February 1987 (aged 79); Hyattsville, Maryland, United States
- Occupation: Editor
- Known for: Assassinating Pyotr Voykov
- Spouse: Nina Alekseevna
- Children: 1
- Status: Deceased
- Conviction: Murder
- Penalty: Life imprisonment with hard labor; commuted to 15 years imprisonment with hard labor

Boris Sofronovich Kowerda (Russian: Бори́с Софро́нович Коверда́, 21 August 1907 – 18 February 1987), also known as Koverda, was a Russian White émigré, monarchist, editor, and proofreader convicted of assassinating Pyotr Voykov, a Soviet party functionary who was a leading figure in the murder of the Romanov family serving as ambassador to Poland, in 1927 in Warsaw.

Kowerda was sentenced to life in prison for the assassination, which was later reduced to 15 years. He was released under an amnesty in 1937, after serving 10 years.

== Biography ==
=== Early life ===
Boris Kowerda, also known as Koverda, born 21 August 1907 in Vilnius (Wilno) then part of the Russian Empire, was the son of a public school teacher, a Socialist Revolutionary of Poleshuk origin, Sofron Iosifovich Kowerda, who was a participant in the White movement during the Russian Civil War and on the side of National-Socialist Germany during World War II. He considered himself Russian by culture and nationality. From 1915 to 1920, he was with his mother Anna Antonova and sisters Irina and Lyudmila during the evacuations in Samara, where he witnessed the Red Terror, in particular, the death of his cousin and the execution of a family friend, the priest Lebedev. The family returned to Wilno, which subsequently became a part of the Second Polish Republic.

Knowing the Belarusian language, he worked as a proofreader and forwarder in the editorial office of the Belarusian anti-communist newspaper Belarusian Words; in his views he described himself as a democrat and a constitutional monarchist. He was forced to leave school early because of the need to earn money.

According to the teachers of the Wilno Russian gymnasium, Kowerda gave the impression of a very intelligent, modest, slightly timid, withdrawn and uncommunicative young man. He was very delicate in relation to members of the administration, teachers and comrades. Not even the usual student faults were observed for him. In the gymnasium he was distinguished by good abilities, but the need for constant earnings distracted him from his studies, and did not allow him to be among the best students. He did not take part in school public life.

=== Assassination of Voykov ===
On 7 June 1927 at 9 am, ambassador Pyotr Voykov, accompanied by an official of the embassy, Yurij Grigorowicz, arrived at the main railway station to meet the accredited representative of the government of the USSR in London, Arkady Rosengolz, who was returning from London via Berlin. Having met Rosengolz, the ambassador proceeded together with him to the railway restaurant to take some coffee, after which they went together out on the platform toward the express train scheduled to leave Warsaw at 9:55, as Rosengolz was to continue his journey to Moscow with this train. At the moment when Ambassador Voykov and Rosengolz approached the sleeper of this train, 19-years-old Kowerda fired a single pistol shot at the ambassador, crying out "Die for Russia!", at which Voykov jumped aside and started to run. Kowerda pursued him with further shots, to which Voykov pulled a pistol from his pocket, turned back and let out several shots at Kowerda, then faltered and collapsed into the arms of the policeman Jasinski. Kowerda, sighting the approaching police, at whose demand he raised his hands, dropped his weapon and gave himself up voluntarily. Ambassador Voykov, after having been given first aid at the station, was transferred to the Hospital of the Child Jesus, where he was pronounced dead at 10:40 the same day.

Kowerda told the police his name, age, and place of origin, and stated that "I avenged Russia, for millions of people." Kowerda later told police he targeted Voykov not only because he was the representative of the Soviet system which had killed millions of his countrymen, but was one of the men directly involved in the planning and execution of the murder of the imperial family. Despite official condemnations by the Polish government and diplomatic corps and messages of condolence to the Soviet Union and to the relations of Voykov, many people in Poland regarded Kowerda as a hero; public opinion was full of understanding, and even sympathy, for the assassin. Many Polish newspapers emphasized his youth and patriotism, and even forgave him for the political difficulties caused by his actions.

On June 15, 1927, a session of the Extraordinary Court was held in Warsaw. The chairman of the court was I. Humiński, with the participation of prosecutor K. Rudnicki, and the lawyers were Paweł Andrejew, Marian Niedzielski, Franciszek Paschalski, and Mieczysław Etzinger. The meeting opened at 10:45. From the morning the courthouse was surrounded by a crowd, which was barely restrained by the police. Several women came with bouquets of flowers for Kowerda, among them the wife of the famous Russian writer Mikhail Artsybashev. The courtroom was overcrowded: representatives of the administration, the court, the prosecutor's office and the police were present on the Polish side. The White Russian emigration was represented by small groups led by the head of the Russian Committee in Warsaw. Also present were several Bolsheviks from the USSR mission. Among the witnesses was the Bolshevik Grigorowicz, who was present at the assassination. There were 120 members of the press, including the communist Pravda and Izvestia, who stayed away from other journalists. Representatives of Belarusian public organizations and the Belarusian press were also in the hall, but neither Polish nor Russian newspapers "noticed" their presence in their publications.

By the end of June 1927, the verdict was known. Despite the fact that Kowerda was defended by some of the best lawyers in Poland, the court sentenced Kowerda to life imprisonment, largely due to external pressure from the Soviet Union, which believed Kowerda did not act alone, but was serving as an agent for a clandestine White opposition organization, but Kowerda and his lawyers were successful in petitioning President of the Republic Ignacy Mościcki to commute his sentence to 15 years. The incident further damaged Soviet-Polish relations, already soured by the Polish–Soviet War of 1920–1921. The Soviets broke off negotiations about a non-aggression pact, accusing the Poles of supporting the anti-Soviet White resistance. They would be resumed in 1931. Kowerda was later amnestied and released from prison on June 15, 1937, after serving 10 years.

=== Emigration ===
Upon his release, he went to Yugoslavia, where in 1938 he passed an external examination for a certificate of maturity at the Russian cadet corps in Bela Crkva.

The outbreak of World War II found Kowerda in Poland, from where he returned to Yugoslavia, where his occupation was interrupted by the German invasion in the spring of 1941. From Yugoslavia, he returned to his family in Warsaw and stayed there until the summer of 1944, when Russian families were given the opportunity to evacuate to Germany amidst the advance of the Red Army. While living in Warsaw, he traveled to the occupied territories of the USSR. In May 1945, Kowerda moved to Liechtenstein together with units of the pro-Axis Russian National Army of Major General Boris Smyslovsky.

After the war, for several years, already with his wife, Nina Alekseevna (1913–2003), and young daughter Natalia, he was successively in Switzerland, France and the Federal Republic of Germany (West Germany), from where in 1949 the family moved via private bill, to emigrate to the United States, where until 1963 he worked in the newspaper Russia in New York City, then in a printing house New Russian Word. He was familiar with Aleksandr Isayevich Solzhenitsyn. He acquired U.S. citizenship in 1956; he and his family had been stateless since the Bolshevik Revolution, having never acquired Polish or German citizenship.

Regarding his naturalization in the United States, the European representative for the Tolstoy Foundation, T.A Schaufuss, wrote to the United States Congress in 1950, stating:

Boris Kowerda is an ardent foe of communism as he was in his early youth, he has not grown bitter with years, but he has matured in his convictions and in the choice of methods of fighting for his homeland. To him communism is no more only a threat to the existence of his country of birth, it is a fire that if not localized or extinguished will burn to the roots all that the rest of the world still considers as having everlasting value: family standards, morals, ethics, religion, and just human decency. The admission to the United States of a man of the moral integrity and fortitude of a Boris Kowerda should not be feared for reasons of safeguarding our country from undesirable elements, because he may prove, if admitted, to become a loyal and useful member of the American community. A favorable review of his case is herewith respectfully requested.

Kowerda lived in New York City and Hyattsville, Maryland, and was active in the Russian-American immigrant community. An extremely devout Orthodox Christian, he often performed volunteer work on behalf of the church and donated to Orthodox charities. Kowerda died in Hyattsville on 18 February 1987, aged 79. He is buried at the Russian Orthodox convent Novo-Diveevo in Nanuet, New York.

== Legacy ==
Kowerda was immortalized in a poem by Russian émigré poet, translator and writer Konstantin Balmont alongside other anti-communist fighters:

Люба мне буква «Ка»,
Вокруг неё сияет бисер.
Пусть вечно светит свет венца
Бойцам Каплан и Каннегисер.

И да запомнят все, в ком есть
Любовь к родимой, честь во взгляде,
Отмстили попранную честь
Борцы Коверда и Конради.

Translation:

I love the letter "Ka",
Beads shine around her.
May the light of the crown shine forever
To fighters Kaplan and Kannegiser.

And may everyone remember who they have
Love for your darling, honor in your eyes,
Trampled honor avenged
Fighters Coverda and Conradi.

Some Orthodox and anti-communist groups in Russia have called for the Voykovskaya Metro (named after Voykov) in Moscow to be renamed in honor of Kowerda. The monarchist organization For Faith and Fatherland proposed erecting a statue to Kowerda in Voykovsky District, Moscow.

== Links ==
- Коверда, Б. С. Покушение на полпреда Войкова
- Зенькович Н. А. Покушения и инсценировки. Расправа на перроне
- Некролог в журнале «Кадетская перекличка», включающий материалы процесса
- «Време», 17. април 1938, стр. 13. Белград — Коверда в Белой Церкви.
