= Lev Zaykov =

Russian politician (1923–2002)

- Лев Зайков
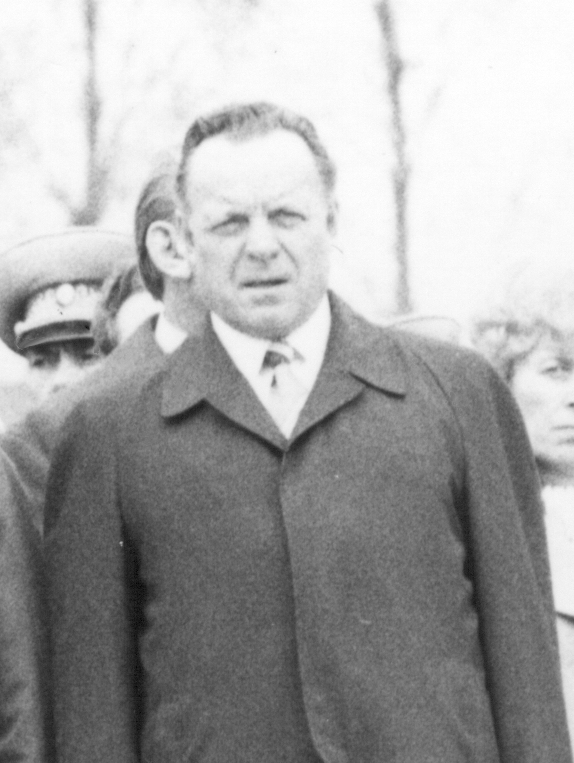
- Zaykov in 1977

Military Industry Secretary of the Communist Party of the Soviet Union
- In office 1985–1990

First Secretary of the Leningrad Regional Party Committee
- In office 1983–1985
- Preceded by: Grigory Romanov
- Succeeded by: Yuri Solovyov

Personal details
- Born: 3 April 1923
- Died: 7 January 2002 (aged 78) Moscow, Russia
- Party: Communist Party of the Soviet Union

Lev Nikolaevich Zaikov (Russian: Лев Никола́евич Зайко́в; 3 April 1923 – 7 January 2002) was a Soviet politician and statesman who served as a member of the Politburo (1986–1990) and Secretary of the CPSU Central Committee (1985–1990). He was responsible for overseeing the Soviet military-industrial complex, a portfolio he inherited from Grigory Romanov. Before his elevation to the central party leadership, Zaikov had a career spanning Leningrad's defense industry, serving as a factory director, head of the city government, and First Secretary of the Leningrad Oblast party committee.

From 1987 to 1989, Zaikov simultaneously served as First Secretary of the Moscow City Party Committee, replacing Boris Yeltsin after the latter's ouster. As the Politburo member responsible for the military-industrial complex, Zaikov was one of a small number of senior Soviet officials who were fully aware of the Soviet Union's secret biological weapons programme, in violation of the Biological Weapons Convention.

== Early life and industrial career ==
Zaikov was born on 3 April 1923 near Tula, into a working-class family. His family subsequently moved to Moscow and then to Leningrad. In 1940, he began working as an apprentice die-maker at Factory No. 133 (an aviation industry plant) in Leningrad. During the Great Patriotic War, he worked twelve-hour shifts as a fitter and die-maker at defense enterprises. He attempted to volunteer for front-line service on three occasions but was returned to factory work each time due to his classification as an essential worker.

After the war, Zaikov rose through the ranks of Leningrad's industrial enterprises, holding positions as group leader, foreman, senior foreman, deputy workshop chief, workshop chief, and production manager at factories in Moscow and Leningrad. In 1963, he graduated from the Leningrad Engineering-Economics Institute.

From 1961 to 1971, Zaikov served as director of the Leningrad State Plant "Novator," an enterprise of the Ministry of Radio Industry that produced complex radio-electronic systems and avionics for military and civilian aircraft, including the Su-24, Il-76, and An-22. For his work in fulfilling the five-year plan and organizing the production of new technology, he was awarded the title Hero of Socialist Labour by a secret decree on 26 April 1971. He subsequently served as general director of the Leningrad Production-Technical Association "Novator" (1971–1973) and then as general director of the scientific-production association Leninets (1974–1976), one of the major defense electronics enterprises in the Soviet Union.

== Chairman of the Leningrad City Executive Committee ==
In 1976, Zaikov was appointed chairman of the Executive Committee of the Leningrad City Soviet, effectively serving as the city's chief executive. He held this post until 1983. During this period, he oversaw significant urban development and infrastructure projects in Leningrad.

== First Secretary of the Leningrad Oblast party (1983–1985) ==
In June 1983, Zaikov was appointed First Secretary of the Leningrad Oblast Committee of the CPSU, succeeding Grigory Romanov, who had been transferred to Moscow as a Secretary of the Central Committee. During his tenure, Zaikov introduced the "Intensification-90" programme, an economic acceleration plan aimed at promoting technological modernisation across the Leningrad region. The programme made a favourable impression on Mikhail Gorbachev during the latter's first visit to Leningrad as General Secretary in May 1985.

== Central Committee Secretary and Politburo member ==
=== Defense industry portfolio (1985–1990) ===
On 1 July 1985, Zaikov was transferred to Moscow and appointed a Secretary of the CPSU Central Committee, assuming responsibility for the Soviet defense industry and military-industrial complex—the same portfolio previously held by Romanov. A 1986 article in Foreign Affairs noted that Zaikov's rise had been "meteoric," having moved from Leningrad to the Central Committee Secretariat only in July 1985 and then being elected a full member of the Politburo at the 27th Party Congress in March 1986. Air & Space Forces Magazine described him as the Politburo member "believed to be responsible for defense industry."

In this capacity, Zaikov chaired the Politburo commission that oversaw the Soviet Union's secret biological weapons programme operated by Biopreparat. At a meeting in his Central Committee offices on 27 July 1989, Zaikov convened sixteen senior officials—including Foreign Minister Eduard Shevardnadze, KGB Chairman Vladimir Kryuchkov, and Chief of the General Staff Mikhail Moiseyev—to discuss the risk of exposure posed by the forthcoming Chemical Weapons Convention and its mandatory on-site inspection provisions. In May 1990, following the defection of Vladimir Pasechnik, a senior Biopreparat scientist, and subsequent British and American diplomatic protests, Zaikov wrote to Gorbachev and Shevardnadze outlining details of the programme and assessing the damage Pasechnik's disclosures might cause.

=== First Secretary of the Moscow City Party Committee (1987–1989) ===
On 11 November 1987, following Boris Yeltsin's dramatic ouster from the Moscow party leadership, Zaikov was appointed First Secretary of the Moscow City Party Committee, a position he held concurrently with his Central Committee Secretaryship. The Washington Post reported that Zaikov's appointment was "viewed by many western diplomats and some Soviets as the first concrete signal that the Kremlin leader's reform campaign is losing ground to opposition." Zaikov held the Moscow post until June 1989.

== Later life and death ==
Zaikov was removed from the Politburo and the Secretariat in July 1990 and retired from active political life. From 1989 to 1990, he had also served as deputy chairman of the USSR Defence Council. Until January 1992, he remained a member of the Group of General Inspectors of the Soviet Ministry of Defence.

In late 1997, Zaikov returned to Saint Petersburg, where he served as an adviser to the president of the Leninets Holding Company until his death. He died on 7 January 2002 in Saint Petersburg at the age of 78 and was buried at Serafimovskoe Cemetery.

== Awards and honours ==
- Hero of Socialist Labour (1971)
- Three Orders of Lenin
- USSR State Prize (1975)

Party political offices
Preceded by Grigory Romanov	First Secretary of the Leningrad Oblast Party Committee; 1983–1985	Succeeded by Yuri Solovyov
Preceded by Boris Yeltsin	First Secretary of the Moscow City Party Committee; 1987–1989	Succeeded by Yuri Prokofyev
