= Arkady Rosengolts =

Soviet politician

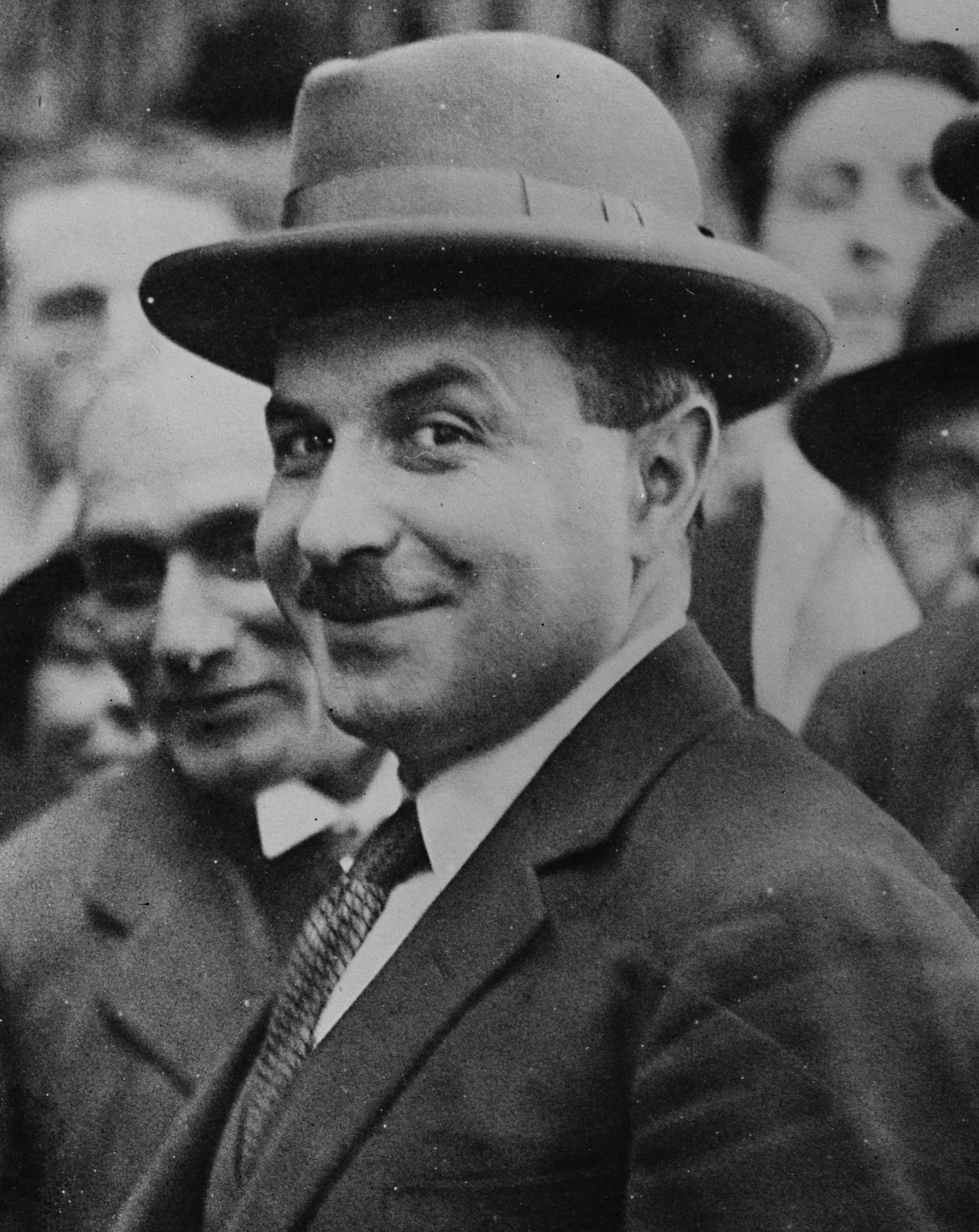
Rosengolts in London, June 1927

Arkady Pavlovich Rosengolts (Russian: Арка́дий Па́влович Розенго́льц; 4 November 1889 – 15 March 1938; sometimes spelled Rosengoltz or Rosenholz) was a Bolshevik revolutionary, Soviet military leader, politician and diplomat. He was the People's Commissar of Foreign Trade and a defendant at the Moscow Trial of the Twenty-One in 1938.

== Early life ==
Rosengolts was born in Vitebsk on 4 November 1889. He was the son of a Jewish merchant. Late in life, he said that he was raised by a woman who was an active revolutionary, and that at the age of ten, he had to hide illegal literature during a police raid. He joined the Bolshevik faction of the Russian Social-Democratic Workers' Party (RSDLP) in 1905, the year of the first, abortive Russian Revolution, and was arrested for the first time at the age of 16. In 1906, he was a Bolshevik delegate to the Fourth RSDLP Congress, in Stockholm. He worked as an insurance agent and carried out work for the Bolshevik party in Vitebsk, Kiev, Ekaterinoslav and Moscow. Rosengolts played an active role in the Revolution of 1917. He was a member of the executive committee of the Moscow City Council, the Moscow Military Revolutionary Committee and the All-Russian Military-Revolutionary Committee.

From the beginning of the Russian civil war, Rosengolts was a political commissar with the Red Army, and played a leading role in the conquest of Kazan in the Volga region during 1918. This brought him close to Leon Trotsky, who appointed him in September 1918 to the Revolutionary War Council, which directed the war effort. He was removed from the council in July, but continued to serve as a political commissar with the Fifth Red Army for the campaign against the White army of Admiral Kolchak in Siberia.

In August 1920, Rosengolts was assigned to create the Joint Transport Committee (Tsektran), working with Trotsky, which provoked bitter opposition from the trade unions, because it brought the railway and water transport workers' unions under political control. From January 1922 to November 1924, he was head of the Soviet Air Force. In this capacity, he conducted secret negotiations with German high command, with the aim of securing military co-operation, principally against Poland. In July 1923, he had a secret meeting with the German Chancellor, Wilhelm Cuno in a private apartment in Berlin, but talks floundered after the fall of the Cuno government.

In December 1923, Rosengolts signed The Declaration of 46, which called for greater party democracy, and which implied that his allegiance was to the left opposition, which supported Trotsky when the communist party split in the mid-1920s. This invoked a sarcastic response from Joseph Stalin, writing in Pravda in December 1923: "In the ranks of the opposition there are men like Rosengolts, whose 'democracy' was a misery to our water transport workers and railwaymen."

== In London ==
In 1925–27, Rosengolts was counsellor and chargé d'affaires at the Soviet embassy in Britain. This in line with Stalin's practice of sending leading oppositionists, such as Christian Rakovsky, out of the country on diplomatic missions.

Rosengolts ran the embassy from November 1925, when Rakovsky was transferred from London to Paris, until the new Ambassador, Leonid Krasin arrived in July 1926, and after Krasin's death in November 1926. In December, he reported to Moscow that relations between the UK and USSR were deteriorating because of soviet support for the miners' strike in the UK and communist involvement in the crisis in China.

On 12 May 1927, Special Branch police raided the London headquarters of the Soviet trade delegation and the All-Russian Co-operative Society, 'Arcos' looking for a document allegedly stolen from the War Office. Rosengolts protested to the British government, and submitted a seven-page memorandum claiming that there was "no particle of evidence that the Trade delegation or Arcos or any of their employees have ever engaged in military espionage."

But on 24 May, the British Prime Minister, Stanley Baldwin, told the UK Parliament that the police had uncovered a wealth of documents obtained by spies in a 'subterranean photostat room'. Baldwin did not directly accuse Rosengolts of espionage, singling out the trade representative, Lev Khinchuk instead, but he implied that Rosengolts was a liar. The police had seized correspondence between the People's Commissariat for Foreign Affairs and the Soviet agent Mikhail Borodin, who at the time of the Arcos affair was in China, where the British suspected that he was planning a communist takeover. Baldwin pointed out that Rosengolts had written to the London Daily Telegraph claiming that "Borodin is a private individual who is not and never has been in the service of the Soviet government." Borodin was in fact working for Comintern.

Speaking in Parliament two days later, the Home Secretary, William Joynson-Hicks alleged that Rosengolts "knew perfectly well that there were incriminating documents passing to and fro between Moscow and London."

The British government severed diplomatic relations with the Soviet Union on 25 May 1927, and expelled Rosengolts. As he was returning from London, he stopped off in Warsaw, where he witnessed the assassination of the soviet ambassador, Pyotr Voykov by Boris Kowerda.

== Later career ==
Rosengolts had severed any connection with the opposition by the time of his return to Moscow, when he became a loyal supporter of Stalin. In 1927–30, he worked for Rabkrin and served on the Central Control Commission, the body responsible for party discipline and expelling oppositionists.

On 10 September 1930, he was appointed Deputy People's Commissar for Trade. This was a promotion and a sign of Stalin's confidence in his ability. The People's Commissar was Anastas Mikoyan, a member of Stalin's inner circle, but Stalin had concluded that Mikoyan was not able to deal with the USSR's trade deficit and decided to "prop him up" with an "outstanding deputy".

In November 1930, the commissariat was divided into two, and Rosengolts was appointed People's Commissar for Foreign Trade. Under pressure to improve the USSR's trade balance, he clashed fiercely with the People's Commissar for Heavy Industry, Sergo Ordzhonikidze, who needed imported equipment. One argument became so heated that Ordzhonikidze nearly hit Rosengolts. Reporting back from a Politburo session in August 1931, Stalin's deputy, Lazar Kaganovich commented that "the exchange of courtesies between 'Rozen' and Sergo was very unpleasant."

== Arrest and death ==
On 14 June 1937, early in the Great Purge, Rosengolts was dismissed from this office, and appointed head of the department for state reserves, while the NKVD was building a case against him. He was arrested on 7 October 1937. He was one of the defendants of the third Moscow Trial, along with Nikolai Bukharin, Alexey Rykov, and other prominent Soviet officials.

The accused faced a long list of capital charges, including plotting to assassinate Lenin and Stalin, espionage and sabotage. Rosengolts was also accused of having passed military secrets to Germany, on Trotsky's orders, during the negotiations he conducted in 1923, and of embezzling huge sums to finance the opposition. Like most of his co-defendants, Rosengolts confessed. In his final plea to the court he declared: "There is not a single man in the world who brought to much sorrow and misfortune to people as Trotsky ... Long live, flourish and grow in strength the great, mighty, beautiful USSR, advancing from victory to victory. He was sentenced to death and shot on 15 March 1938 in Moscow.

In March 1988, the Communist Party announced that the entire trial was based on fake evidence and false confessions, and 'rehabilitated' Rosengolts and other defendants.

== Personality ==
Alexander Barmine, an employee of the People's Commissariat for Foreign Trade, described Rosengolts as "a bulky-shouldered, handsome Jew, with a heavy jaw and iron character ... He was a forceful executive with a strong feeling for authority, a born bureaucrat and, when I knew him, devoted to Stalin." He believed that Rosengolts's skillful handling of foreign trade saved the USSR from economic catastrophe in the 1930s. But the scientist, Vladimir Ipatieff, who encountered Rosengolts in the 1920s, thought him a "pompous, conceited man, in my opinion utterly worthless as an executive."

== Sources ==
- Khrushchev, Nikita, 'Speech to the Twentieth Communist Party Congress' (1956).
- Orlov, Alexander, The Secret History of Stalin's Crimes. Random House, 1953.
- Report Of Court Proceedings In The Case Of The Anti-Soviet "Bloc Of Rights And Trotskyites". Heard Before The Military Collegium Of The Supreme Court Of The U.S.S.R., Moscow, March 2–13, 1938. In Re: N.I. Bukharin, A.I. Rykov, G.G. Yagoda et al. Verbatim Report. People's Commissariat of Justice of the U.S.S.R., Moscow, 1938.
- 'The Great Conspiracy.' Marxist Internet Archive. Online at: http://marxism.halkcephesi.net/Great%20Conspiracy/GC-AK-MS-chapter20.htm.
- http://www.hrono.ru/biograf/bio_r/rozengolc_ap.php.
