= Leonid Drachevsky =

Soviet rower and diplomat

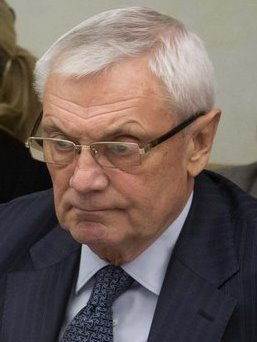
- Drachevsky in 2018

Personal information
- Native name: Леонид Драчевский
- Born: 5 April 1942 (age 84) Alma-ata, Kazakh SSR, Soviet Union
- Height: 191 cm (6 ft 3 in)
- Weight: 87 kg (192 lb)

Sport
- Sport: Rowing

Leonid Drachevsky (Russian: Леонид Вадимович Драчевский; born 5 April 1942) is a Kazakh rower He competed at the 1968 Summer Olympics in Mexico City with the men's coxed pair where they qualified for the small final but did not start.

Drachevsky later became a diplomat and served as consul in Barcelona in 1992 and as ambassador of Russia to Poland from 1996 to 1999. In 1998 and 1999, he was a Deputy Foreign Minister of the Russian Federation. In the period 2000–2004, he was the Plenipotentiary Envoy of the President of Russia to the Siberian Federal District. On 23 December 2000, Leonid Drachevsky was promoted to the civilian service rank of 1st class Active State Councillor of the Russian Federation.

Diplomatic posts
Preceded by Yury Kashlev	Ambassador to Poland; 1996–1999	Succeeded by Sergey Razov
