= Sergey Kalyakin =

Belarusian opposition politician (1952–2024)

- Сяргей Калякін
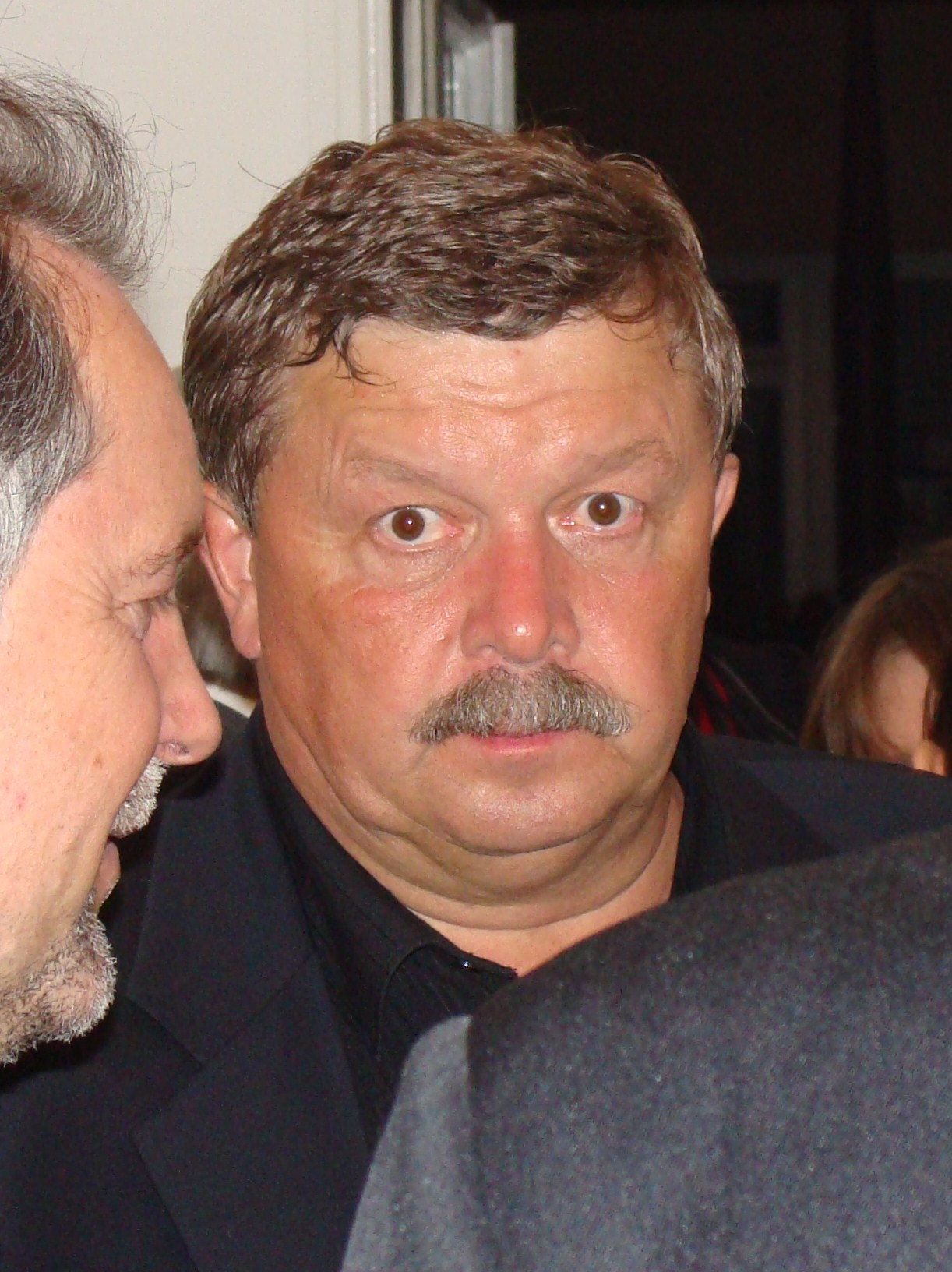
- Kalyakin in 2011

Personal details
- Born: 16 June 1952 Minsk, Byelorussian SSR, USSR
- Died: 15 August 2024 (aged 72)
- Party: Belarusian Left Party "A Just World" (1991–2023)
- Other political affiliations: Communist Party of the Soviet Union (1977–1991)
- Relations: Nikolai Dementey (uncle)

Sergey Ivanovich Kalyakin (Note: Belarusian: Сяргей Іванавіч Калякін, Łacinka: Siarhiej Ivanavič Kalakin Russian: Серге́й Ива́нович Каля́кин) (16 June 1952 – 15 August 2024) was a Belarusian opposition politician who was the leader of the Belarusian Left Party "A Just World", until 2009 known as the Party of Communists of Belarus. He was the nephew of Nikolai Dementey, former chairman of the Supreme Soviet of the Byelorussian Soviet Socialist Republic.

In 1977 he graduated from the Belarusian State University of Informatics and Radioelectronics, becoming a radio engineer. In 1992, he received a diploma of political science at the Belarusian State University. He was a member of the Communist Party of the Soviet Union from 1977 until the dissolution of the Soviet Union in 1991. Following the 1991 declaration of independence of Belarus, he joined the newly-formed Party of Belarusian Communists.

Kalyakin was a candidate for presidency in Belarus in 2001, 2006, and 2015. Following his defeat in the 2006 opposition primary, he assisted the ultimately-unsuccessful campaign of Alaksandar Milinkievič against incumbent Alexander Lukashenko. In 2009, he was elected chairman of the Belarusian Left Party.

Kalyakin died on 15 August 2024, at the age of 72.

== Political positions ==
Kalyakin supported the Russian occupation of Crimea, saying that Russia defended people which it considers to be its potential citizens.
