= Yuri Soloviev (politician) =

Soviet politician (1925–2011)

- Ю́рий Соловьёв
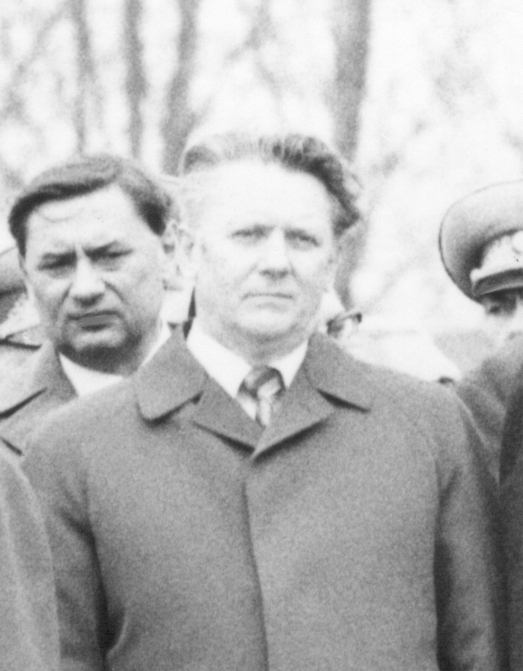
- Soloviev in 1977

First Secretary of the Leningrad Regional Party Committee
- In office 1985–1989
- Preceded by: Lev Zaykov
- Succeeded by: Boris Gidaspov

Candidate for membership in the Politburo
- In office 1986–1989

Personal details
- Born: 20 August 1925 Bogatoye Buzuluksky Uyezd, Samara Governorate, Russian SFSR, Soviet Union
- Died: 2 October 2011 (aged 86) Saint Petersburg, Russia
- Party: Communist Party of the Soviet Union (1944–1986)

Yuri Filippovich Solovyov (Russian: Ю́рий Фили́ппович Соловьёв; 20 August 1925 – 2 October 2011) was a Soviet politician who served as First Secretary of the Leningrad Oblast committee of the Communist Party of the Soviet Union (CPSU) from 1985 to 1989 and as a candidate (non-voting) member of the CPSU Politburo from 1986 to 1989.

Before entering party leadership, Solovyov had a career in civil engineering, spending over two decades on the construction of the Leningrad Metro, ultimately serving as head of its construction directorate. His defeat in the 1989 Soviet Union legislative election—in which he ran unopposed but was rejected by voters who crossed his name off the ballot—became one of the most emblematic moments of the election and a symbol of public disillusionment with the CPSU during perestroika. TIME described him as "the most prominent victim" of the election.

== Early life and engineering career ==
Solovyov was born on 20 August 1925 in Samara Governorate (now Samara Oblast). His family moved to Leningrad in 1929. In 1943, he was called up to the Red Army and served during the Great Patriotic War, being demobilised in 1944 after sustaining a serious wound.

After the war, Solovyov studied at the Leningrad Institute of Railway Engineers, graduating in 1951. He began working immediately on the construction of the Leningrad Metro, holding positions as shift supervisor and section chief before becoming chief engineer in 1961. From 1967 to 1973, he served as head of Lenmetrostroy, the directorate responsible for all Leningrad Metro construction.

== Party and government career ==
=== Leningrad party apparatus (1973–1984) ===
In 1973, Solovyov transitioned from engineering to government and party work, serving as deputy chairman of the Leningrad City Executive Committee (1973–1974). He then moved into the CPSU apparatus, serving as a secretary (from 1974) and then second secretary (from 1975) of the Leningrad Oblast committee. From 1978 to 1984, he served as First Secretary of the Leningrad City Party Committee, the de facto leader of the city's party organisation. In 1984, he was appointed Minister of Industrial Construction of the USSR, a post he held briefly before returning to Leningrad.

=== First Secretary of the Leningrad Oblast party (1985–1989) ===
On 8 July 1985, following the transfer of Lev Zaikov to Moscow as a Secretary of the CPSU Central Committee, Solovyov was appointed First Secretary of the Leningrad Oblast committee of the CPSU. At the 27th Party Congress in March 1986, he was elected a candidate member of the Politburo. He was a member of the CPSU Central Committee from 1976 to 1990.

=== 1989 election defeat ===
In the March 1989 elections for the Congress of People's Deputies of the Soviet Union, Solovyov stood as the sole candidate in his Leningrad constituency. Under Soviet electoral rules, voters in a single-candidate race could accept or reject the candidate by leaving or crossing out the name on the ballot. Approximately 60 percent of voters crossed Solovyov's name off, meaning he failed to secure the required majority and was not elected.

The Washington Post reported that Solovyov's defeat was part of a broader pattern in which "voters with a choice between party apparatchiks and advocates of reform almost invariably chose the reformists." TIME called him "the most prominent victim" of the elections, noting that even unopposed candidates "still had to collect 50% of the vote." The Christian Science Monitor described Solovyov as "one of the most openly skeptical members of the top leadership with regard to reform."

At a Politburo session on 28 March 1989 discussing the election results, Solovyov reported that all seven party leaders in Leningrad had been defeated. He attributed the outcome not to rejection of individual candidates but to broader voter dissatisfaction with the pace of perestroika.

=== Removal from office ===
In July 1989, during a visit to Leningrad by Mikhail Gorbachev, Solovyov was removed as First Secretary of the Leningrad Oblast committee. Speaking to Soviet television afterward, Gorbachev expressed dissatisfaction with the Leningrad party leadership's failure to keep pace with political change. He was replaced by Boris Gidaspov. In September 1989, at a Central Committee plenum, Solovyov was removed from his position as candidate member of the Politburo. The Washington Post reported that his dismissal "had been expected following his failure to get elected as a people's deputy."

== Later life ==
After his removal, Solovyov retired as a "personal pensioner of all-Union significance," a designation for senior Soviet officials. He died on 2 October 2011 in Saint Petersburg.

== Awards ==
- Hero of Socialist Labour
- Order of Lenin (twice)
- Order of the October Revolution
- Order of the Red Banner of Labour

Political offices
Preceded by Lev Zaykov	First Secretary of the Leningrad Oblast Party Committee; 1985–1989	Succeeded by Boris Gidaspov
