= Grigory Romanov =

Soviet politician (1923–2008)

- Григорий Романов
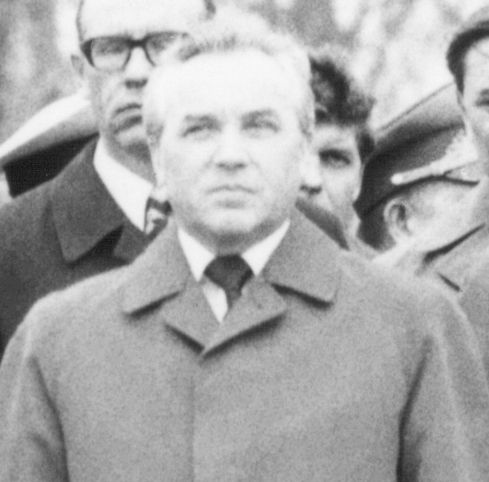
- Romanov in 1977

Military Industry Secretary of the Communist Party of the Soviet Union
- In office 15 June 1983 – 6 March 1986
- Preceded by: Yakov Ryabov
- Succeeded by: Lev Zaykov

First Secretary of the Leningrad Regional Party Committee
- In office 16 September 1970 – 24 June 1983
- Preceded by: Vasily Tolstikov
- Succeeded by: Lev Zaykov
Additional positions
Full member of the 25th, 26th Politburo
In office
5 March 1976 – 1 July 1985
Member of the 26th Secretariat
In office
15 June 1983 – 6 March 1986

Personal details
- Born: 7 February 1923 Zikhnovo, Borovichsky Uyezd, Novgorod Governorate, Russian SFSR, Soviet Union
- Died: 3 June 2008 (aged 85) Moscow, Russia
- Party: Communist Party of the Soviet Union (1944–1986)

Grigory Vasilyevich Romanov (Russian: Григорий Васильевич Романов; 7 February 1923 – 3 June 2008), a Soviet politician, served as a member of the Politburo and Secretariat of the Communist Party of the Soviet Union. Romanov began his political career as a local politician in Leningrad, eventually emerging as the main rival to Mikhail Gorbachev for the position of General Secretary in the 1985 succession struggle after the death of Konstantin Chernenko. Bypassed for the top post, Romanov soon had to retire from his political duties; he lived as a pensioner, joining the Communist Party of the Russian Federation before his death.

== Early life and career ==
Romanov was born in 1923 in Novgorod Governorate into a peasant family.

He was a soldier in the Red Army during the Great Patriotic War, Romanov joined the Communist Party of the Soviet Union (CPSU) in 1944. Romanov graduated from the Leningrad Shipbuilding Institute in 1953, and became a designer in a shipyard. He fulfilled several important posts in the party committee of the enterprise he was working at and later in the Leningrad city and regional party committees. In September 1970 he was elected as First Secretary of the Communist Party Committee of the Leningrad Region. In this position he gained a reputation of being a good organizer and well versed in economic matters, winning defense investment for Leningrad. He was elected as a member of the Central Committee of the Communist Party of the Soviet Union at the XXIVth congress of the CPSU in 1971. He became a candidate member of the Central Committee's Politburo in 1973 and a full member in 1976.

In 1977 he initiated a successful vote to remove Nikolai Podgorny, the then Chairman of the Presidium of the Supreme Soviet, from the Politburo.

== Secretary of the Central Committee ==
In 1983, Romanov attracted the attention of the new General Secretary Yuri Andropov, who subsequently brought him to Moscow and helped promote him in June 1983 to the very prestigious and influential post of a secretary of the Central Committee of the CPSU responsible for industry and the military–industrial complex. During the few remaining months of Andropov's life Romanov was widely seen as one of Andropov's closest collaborators and was an ardent supporter of Andropov's comprehensive program for the reform, renewal and further development of socialism in the Soviet Union and beyond, a fact which stands in sharp contrast to the picture Gorbachev and his associates were later to paint of Romanov as a means of gaining advantage in the power struggles following Andropov's death in February 1984.

Romanov attracted international attention on 5 November 1983 during the height of Operation Able Archer. He addressed the Kremlin Palace of Congresses in order to commemorate the October Revolution, where he remarked:

The development of events in the world arena demands from us the highest vigilance, restraint, firmness and unremitting attention to the strengthening of the country's defense capability... Perhaps never before in the postwar decades has the situation in the world arena been as tense as it is now... Comrades! The international situation at present is white hot, thoroughly white hot.

Western analysts, unaware of the Exercise that was taking place and therefore uncertain as to why Romanov would describe the situation as "white hot", dismissed the remarks as Soviet propaganda.

During Konstantin Chernenko's short time in office as General Secretary in 1984–1985, Romanov already occupied a position clearly inferior to Gorbachev, who had been styled Second Secretary of the Central Committee since February 1984 and acted as chairman of the Politburo, Secretariat and Central Committee in the course of Chernenko's long periods of absence due to his illness.

== Gorbachev vs. Romanov ==
Romanov was the second youngest member of the Politburo after Gorbachev. In the months preceding the death of Konstantin Chernenko in March 1985, Romanov and Gorbachev were commonly regarded to be chief rivals in the succession struggle for the post of General Secretary. Viktor Grishin was also considered a viable candidate.

However, after Chernenko's death, Gorbachev emerged with the strongest position to succeed Chernenko. Andrei Gromyko, one of the oldest and widely respected Politburo members, nominated Gorbachev for the position of General Secretary of CPSU, both at the 11 March meeting of Politburo and subsequently at the March 1985 Plenum (meeting) of the Central Committee of the CPSU. Neither Romanov nor Grishin mounted a formal challenge to Gorbachev's bid, and the votes in favor of Gorbachev, both in the 11 March meeting of Politburo and at the March Plenum, were unanimous.

== End of career ==
Gorbachev quickly moved to oust Romanov following his ascent to become General Secretary. He informed Romanov that he had no future under him, and sacked him three months later. Romanov was forced to retire from the Politburo on 1 July 1985.

Romanov subsequently lived as a pensioner in Moscow. After the collapse of the Soviet Union, he joined the Communist Party of the Russian Federation and became a member of the Central Advisory Council under the Central Committee of the Communist Party of the Russian Federation. For several years, he headed the "Association of Leningradians in Moscow".

He was buried at the Kuntsevo Cemetery in Moscow.
