= Pyotr Voykov =

Soviet diplomat, politician, and regicide (1888–1927)

- Пётр Войков
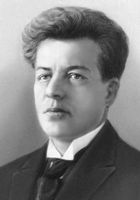

Envoy Extraordinary and Minister Plenipotentiary of the Soviet Union to Poland
- In office November 8, 1924 – June 7, 1927
- Preceded by: Leonid Obolensky
- Succeeded by: Dmitry Bogomolov

Chairman of the Yekaterinburg City Duma
- In office December 2, 1917 – July 26, 1918

Personal details
- Born: Pyotr Lazarevich Voykov; August 13, 1888 Kerch, Taurida Governorate, Russian Empire
- Died: June 7, 1927 (aged 38) Warsaw, Poland
- Cause of death: Assassination by gunshot
- Resting place: Kremlin Wall Necropolis, Moscow
- Party: RSDLP (Menshevik); RSDLP (Bolsheviks); Communist Party
- Spouse: Adelaide Abramovna Belenkina
- Children: Pavel Petrovich Voykov
- Education: University of Geneva
- Known for: Participation in the Execution of the Romanov family

Pyotr Lazarevich Voykov (Russian: Пётр Лазаревич Войков; Ukrainian: Петро Лазарович Войков, romanized: Petro Lazarovych Voikov; party aliases: Пётрусь and Интеллигент, or Piotrus and Intelligent) (13 August [O.S. 1 August] 1888 – June 7, 1927) was a Ukrainian Bolshevik revolutionary and Soviet diplomat known as one of the participants in the decision to murder the former Russian Emperor Nicholas II and his family members.

Minister Plenipotentiary of the Soviet Union to the Polish Republic (1924–1927), he was assassinated in Warsaw by an anti-Bolshevik White émigré. The continued use of Voykov's name in modern Russia's toponymy has been a cause of controversy.

== Early life ==
He was born August 13 [O.S. August 1] 1888 into a Ukrainian family of peasant origin in the city of Kerch, Taurida Governorate. His father, Lazar Petrovich Voykov, was expelled from St. Petersburg Mining Institute, then graduated from teacher's seminary in Tiflis and worked as a mathematics teacher. Later he was forced to leave this post; he worked as a shop foreman at the metallurgical plant and worked as an engineer at various enterprises. His mother Alexandra Filippovna (née Ivanova, 1869–1953) received a good education, graduating from the Kerch Institute for Noble Maidens. The couple had three other children, son Pavel and daughters Valentina and Militsa. Militsa Lazarevna Voykova (1896–1966) later became an actress of the Central Children's Theater. Controversy exists as to whether Voykov's family had Jewish origins, particularly among the far right. The vast majority of historians, however, refute these claims.

== Beginning of his revolutionary activity ==
Voykov became involved in revolutionary activity at a young age. He studied at the same Gymnasium from which Andrei Zhelyabov, one of the chief organizers of the assassination of Alexander II of Russia, graduated with a silver medal. Already in the gymnasium, Voykov thought about killing the Tsar. He was expelled from the sixth grade of the Kerch Gymnasium, but he managed to pass examinations for grade seven. His parents had to change their place of residence and work as a result of his underground activities. The family moved to Keukeneiz, where his father took on the position as a road master in the estate of the landowner Alchevsky. Thanks to the efforts of his mother, Pyotr was accepted into the eighth grade of the Yalta Alexandrovskaya Men's Gymnasium, but he was soon expelled from there too.

The exact date of Voykov's accession to the RSDLP is not known, but a period between 1903 and 1905 is assumed. The Great Soviet Encyclopedia points out that he was a "Menshevik " since 1903. In 1905 Voykov was already a member of the Kerch Committee of the RSDLP and fought in the ranks of the self-defense squad. Voykov also was a member of the fighting squad of local social-democrats after moving to Yalta.

=== The explosion in 1906 ===
Voykov was one of the five organizers and participants in the terrorist attack on July 20, 1906, against the local police chief, M. M. Gvozdevich. According to the official Soviet biography of Voykov, the initial purpose of the operation was not a terrorist act, but the transportation of bombs, prepared for self-defense, from a cache to a place outside the city, where they were planned to be discharged. According to this version, the decision to attack the police chief was taken impulsively by the two other participants in the operation.

The terrorist act was a complete failure, the two persons most responsible for it were heavily wounded and soon died, and M. M. Gvozdevich was not injured. It is known that Mensheviks were the least extremist of any of the groups within the RSDLP and rejected terrorism as a method of a political struggle. But they prepared bombs for an armed uprising and the central leadership could not fully control the proliferation of weapons and the behavior of radical young people. Voykov fled first to Kekeneiz, to his father, and then to Sevastopol and St. Petersburg. Two other participants in the terrorist act, Dmitry Nashaburgsky and Pyotr Koren, did not mention Voykov's name. Voykov's participation was only established as fact in 1907.

=== Assassination attempt on Dumbadze in 1907 ===
From the autumn of 1906, the duties of the mayor in Yalta were performed by General Dumbadze. On February 26, 1907, a bomb was thrown from the balcony of Novikov's dacha at Dumbadze, who was passing by in a carriage. Dumbadze was bruised and scratched, while the driver and adjutant were injured.

Even after the terrorist shot himself, Dumbadze ordered his troops to burn down the dacha, and the soldiers additionally looted the adjacent house. Voykov (the militia fighter of the RSDLP) had no relation to the action on February 26, 1907, because it was organized by one of the "flying combat units" of the Socialist Revolutionary Party. In addition, he left Yalta shortly after the unsuccessful explosion on July 20, 1906, and from the autumn of 1906 studied in St. Petersburg University. However, an assassination attempt on Dumbadze revived the investigation into the case on July 20. As a result, Voykov was forced to leave Petersburg; in summer 1907 he was hiding in Kharkiv for several months, and then emigrated.

== Emigration ==
In 1907 Voykov left Russia on the passport of his classmate. In March 1908 he arrived in Geneva, Switzerland. In September 1909 he entered the Physics and Mathematics Department of the University of Geneva. In Geneva he met Vladimir Lenin and, although he was not yet a Bolshevik, he remained a Menshevik-Internationalist during the First World War, actively spoke out against the "defencists", and was an active participant in the "1st Geneva Group of Assistance". In the spring of 1914 he married Adelaide Abramovna Belenkina, who studied medicine in Geneva. On April 24, 1915, their son Pavel (Note: The brother of Pyotr Voykov, whose name was Pavel, committed suicide in March 1906) was born. Following the February Revolution of 1917, he returned to Russia with his wife and son, though not in the same sealed carriage with Lenin, as it was often claimed, but together with Martov and Lunacharsky in the next group, which arrived in Russia on May 9, 1917.

== Activities in the Urals ==
On returning to Russia, Voykov became a Commissar of the Ministry of Labor of the Provisional Government; he was responsible for resolving conflicts between workers and employers. After the July Days, when the Menshevik faction supported the repression against the rioters and Bolsheviks, Voykov left St. Petersburg for the Urals. There he soon joined the Bolshevik faction and was a member of Yekaterinburg Soviet and was engaged in trade union activities. After the October Revolution he joined the Yekaterinburg Military Revolutionary Committee. 2 December [O.S. 19 November] 1917 he was elected chairman of the Yekaterinburg City Duma.

From January to December 1918 he was Commissar for Supply in the Ural Region Soviet. In this post, he directed transportation of precious metals from Yekaterinburg, successfully sought the supply of foodstuffs from the state reserves to the Urals and personally provided for its delivery. The Great War, two revolutions and the policy of nationalization of industrial plants led to the disintegration of normal economic ties. In order to supply the cities with food, the Soviets resorted to the brutal policy of prodrazvyorstka when armed prodotryads (food detachments) were sent to the villages. As a Commissar of Supply, Voykov also dealt with this. Soviet biographers also note that he managed to organize the exchange of Urals iron for Siberian grain and he dealt with the construction of a railroad between Yekaterinburg and Krasnoufimsk. Russian academic, publicist, and former Minister of Culture of Russia Vladimir Medinsky claimed that Voykov, in this position, was involved in repressions against the entrepreneurs of the Urals, stating:

"Voykov set such prices for food and fuel that private trade in the Urals became impossible. Voykov's activities led to a shortage of goods and a significant decrease in the standard of living of the local population."

== Execution of the Romanovs ==
Informing the local Bolsheviks of the forthcoming arrival of Nicholas II and his family in Yekaterinburg, Sverdlov left it to them whether to imprison the family or offer them accommodations in a mansion. They chose a variant with a mansion turned into a prison.

Voykov knew Nicholas Ipatiev, and had visited the Ipatiev House before it was selected as the final residence of Nicholas II of Russia and his family. It seems to have been on the basis of information supplied by Voykov that Ipatiev was summoned to the office of the Soviet at the end of April 1918 and ordered to vacate what was soon to be called 'The House of Special Purpose'.

During the imperial family's imprisonment in late June, they received letters written in French. Their author was allegedly a monarchist officer, planning to rescue the Tsar and his family. In fact, these letters were composed at the behest of the Cheka. These fabricated letters, along with the Romanov responses to them, written either on blank spaces or on the envelope, were ultimately used by the Ural Soviet, and likely the Central Executive Committee in Moscow, to justify murdering the imperial family.

It appears that these letters were not written by Voykov himself, but by one of the Chekists. Later in memoirs and interviews in the 1960s, two Chekists claimed that Voykov, who for a long time lived abroad and graduated from Geneva University, translated these letters into French. The researchers note, that the letters contained obvious oddities, including an incorrect address to the monarch using vous ("you") instead of Votre Majesté ("Your Majesty"). According to Richard Pipes, the letters were written by a man with a "poor knowledge of French".

As a Commissar of Supply, Voykov signed orders for the distribution of sulfuric acid from the Yekaterinburg pharmacy. Yakov Yurovsky, the commandant of the Ipatiev House from 4 July and later chief executioner, was allegedly going to use sulfuric acid for the destruction of bodies. According to Yurovsky's memoirs of 1934, in addition to acid, he obtained gasoline (or kerosene) and shovels from Voykov. In an earlier testimony Yurovsky does not mention Voykov at all. None of the numerous eyewitnesses mention Voykov as a direct participant in the murder and the concealment of bodies. On July 16, Voykov attended a special session of the Ural Soviet at the Amerikanskaya Hotel, where it was decided the executions would have to be carried out that night.

According to the memoirs of Grigory Besedovsky, a Soviet Diplomat who defected to France, Voykov and his accomplices used bayonets and pierced the breasts of the still living daughters of Nicholas II, as bullets ricocheted off from their corsets. After the killings, Voykov allegedly removed a ring from a corpse with a large ruby. Voykov himself claimed that the ring was taken from the hand of one of the Grand Duchesses and liked to show it off, though such a ring is not mentioned in any official documents or testimony given by the other executioners. Besedovsky also claimed that Voykov was one of the primary orchestrators of the killing of the imperial family, and insisted particularly to the Ural Soviet that the entire family, including all five of the Tsar's children, must be killed.

The reliability of Besedovsky testimony is now seriously questioned. The official investigation, conducted in Russia after the discovery of the remains of the imperial family, showed that the picture painted by Besedovsky was not reliable. Later, Besedovsky became known for his wild fantasy and for the publication of forged documents (for example, "Notebooks" of Stalin's non-existent nephew), as even his friends recognized.

The role of Voykov in the regicide was fully investigated by the commission set up after Admiral Kolchak's White Army captured Yekaterinburg from the Bolsheviks. In the materials of the investigator Sokolov, Voykov was mentioned only as a person related to the distribution of sulfuric acid. The actual disposal of the remains was rather left under the supervision of Yurovsky and Goloshchekin.

== Activities in Moscow ==
After the fall of Yekaterinburg on July 26, 1918, the Ural Soviet evacuated to Perm and Voykov continued his work there. Five months later, on December 25, the troops of admiral Kolchak captured Perm and drove the Soviet forces from there, too. Voykov was summoned to Moscow and worked in the distribution department of People's Commissariat for Food Supplies until July 1919, when he was sent to work in Central Union of Consumer Cooperatives (Tsentrosoyuz).

On October 26, 1920, Voykov was appointed a member of the board of the People's Commissariat of Foreign Trade. Together with Maxim Gorky, he drafted a work plan for the Export Commission. This commission was engaged in buying up and valuation of antiques and works of art and deciding whether they could be sold abroad. Contrary to the frequent claims, however, Voykov had nothing to do with sales from the Diamond Fund, the Kremlin Armoury or the Hermitage—the task of the commission was, on the contrary, to provide museums with appraisals. Stalin's massive sales from museums took place in 1929–1934, long after Voykov left this post and died. The mass sale of 14 Fabergé Eggs occurred in 1930–1933.

== Assassination ==
On June 7, 1927, at 9:00 A.M., the Ambassador Voykov and an official of the Embassy, Yurij Grigorowicz, arrived at the main station in Warsaw. They were there to meet Arkady Rosengolts, who had been relieved of his post as Ambassador of the Soviet Union to the United Kingdom. Rosengolts was returning from London via Berlin, having been summoned to Moscow. After meeting Rosengolts, Voykov and he went to the railway restaurant to have some coffee. Then, they went to the platform to board the express train that was scheduled to leave Warsaw at 9:55. Rosengolts was to continue his journey to Moscow on this train. As Voykov and Rosengolts passed the sleeper of the train, a man fired a pistol shot at Voykov. Voykov jumped aside and started to run. The assailant, who cried out "Die for Russia!", pursued him and fired more shots. Voykov pulled a pistol from his pocket and returned fire at the assailant. However, Voykov faltered and collapsed into the arms of a Polish policeman who had arrived on the scene. The assailant, seeing the approaching police, surrendered himself voluntarily into police custody. The shooter identified himself as Boris Kowerda, and stated that he planned to kill Voykov in order to "Avenge Russia, to avenge millions of people".

Voykov, having received emergency first aid at the station, was rushed to the nearby Hospital of the Child Jesus, where he died at 10:40 A.M. the same day. The autopsy performed on the same day by Professor Grchivo-Dombrowski revealed that Voykov had been shot twice: once fatally in the left side of the chest, and once in the left shoulder. The wound to the chest ruptured Voykov's left lung, causing an internal hemorrhage.

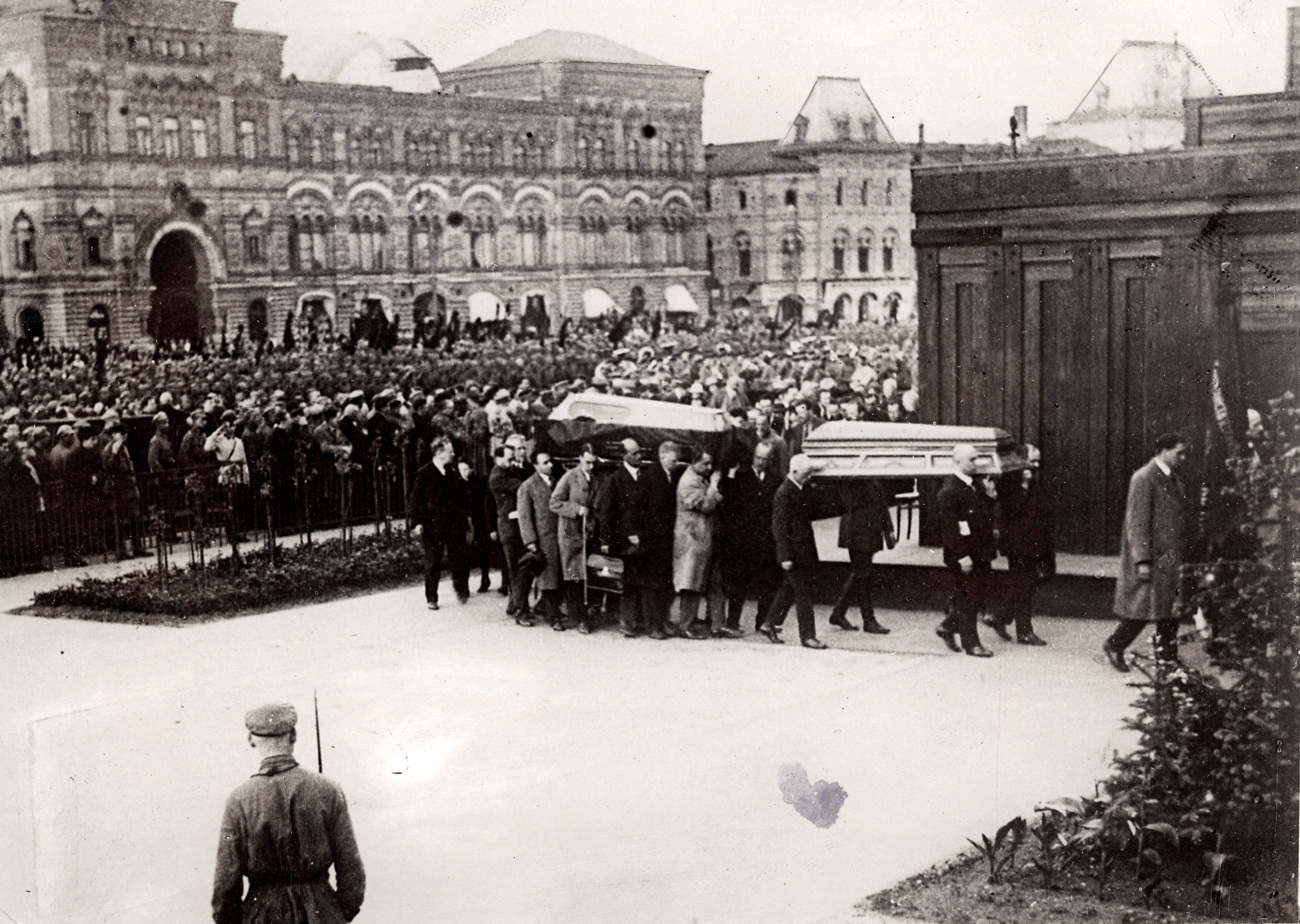
State funeral of Pyotr Voykov, 1927

Voykov's body was transported from the hospital to the Soviet mission, which used the occasion to organize communist demonstrations in Warsaw. The coffin was exhibited in the mission hall for two days. The Polish government expressed its condolences to his widow and the government of the USSR and performed all formal duties. On June 10, the coffin was transported to the Warsaw railway station and from there by train to Moscow. In the streets of Warsaw, the coffin was followed by all the local communists, representatives of the diplomatic corps of Russia and Poland, the Polish government, as well as a department of the Polish Army, which gave signs of military respect and so strictly guarded order that the procession walked through the empty streets.

Despite the official remorse, almost all the newspapers expressed the sympathy of Polish society that Boris Kowerda evoked with his youth and patriotism, and he was even forgiven for the political difficulties caused by his actions. The killing was later justified as vengeance for Voykov's role in the killing of the Tsar and his family, and many people in Poland regarded Kowerda as a hero; public opinion was full of understanding, and even sympathy, for the assassin. A Polish court initially sentenced Kowerda to life imprisonment due to external pressure, but he was successful in petitioning President of the Republic Ignacy Mościcki to commute his sentence to 15 years. Kowerda was later amnestied and released after serving ten years on June 15, 1937.

In retaliation to the assassination of Voykov, the Soviet government extrajudicially executed twenty representatives of the aristocracy of the former Russian Empire as well as former officers of the White Army, in Moscow on the night of June 9–10, 1927, who were either already in prison at that time on various charges or were arrested by the OGPU after the assassination of Voykov.

== Legacy ==
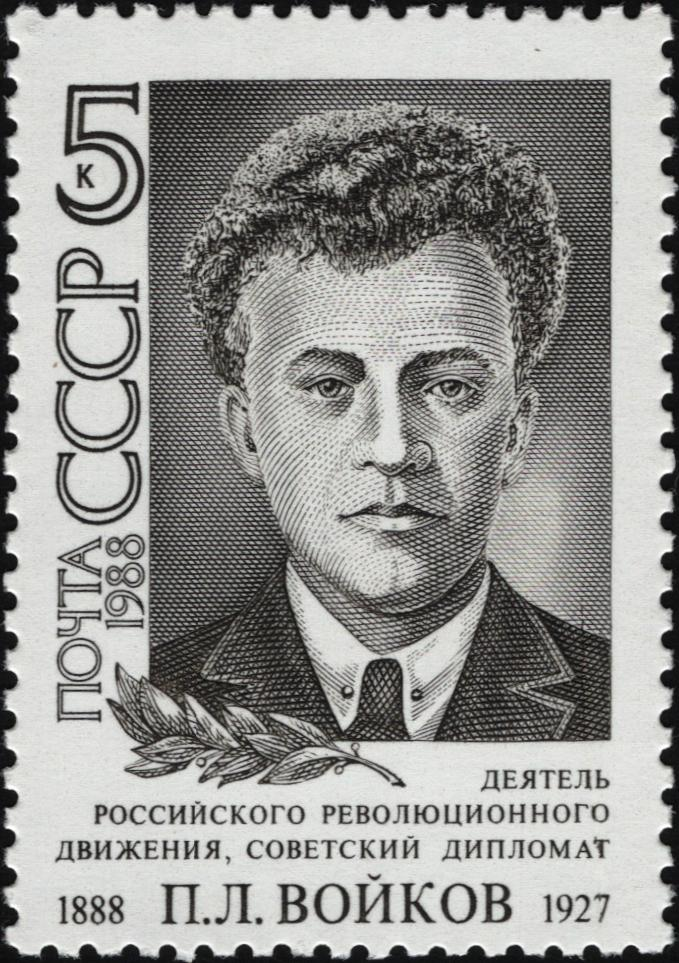
Soviet 1988 commemorative stamp on the occasion of Pyotr Voykov's 100th birthday

The Soviet authorities cherished his memory, giving his name to the Voykovsky District, the Moscow Metro station Voikovskaya, several streets and plants, and a coal mine in Ukraine (since renamed after Ukraine passed decommunization laws). After the canonization of the imperial family, the Russian Orthodox Church urged the authorities to remove the name of Voykov from national toponymy, but that has not materialized as of 2023.

== See also ==
- Alexander Griboyedov, Russian ambassador to Persia, assassinated in 1829
- Grigoriy Shcherbina, Russian Consul to Kosovska Mitrovica, assassinated in 1903
- Vatslav Vorovsky, Soviet envoy at the Conference of Lausanne, assassinated in 1923
- Andrei Karlov, Russian ambassador to Turkey, assassinated in 2016

== Bibliography ==
- Zhukovsky, Nikolay (1968). Полномочный представитель СССР [Minister Plenipotentiary of USSR] (PDF) (in Russian). Moscow: Политиздат. p. 214. Archived from the original (PDF) on 2018-01-31.
- Gubenko, Gitel (1959). Пётр Лазаревич Войков. Краткий биографический очерк [Pyotr Lazarevich Voykov. A short biographical essay] (in Russian). Simferopol: Крымиздат. Archived from the original on 2015-11-17.
