= Galichsky Uyezd =

Administrative subdivision of the Russian Empire

Galichsky Uyezd (Галичский уезд) was one of the subdivisions of the Kostroma Governorate of the Russian Empire. It was situated in the western part of the governorate. Its administrative centre was Galich.

== Demographics ==
At the time of the Russian Empire Census of 1897, Galichsky Uyezd had a population of 107,609. Of these, 99.7% spoke Russian, 0.2% Latvian and 0.1% Yiddish as their native language.
