= Arkady Sobolev =

Soviet diplomat (1903–1964)

- Аркадий Соболев
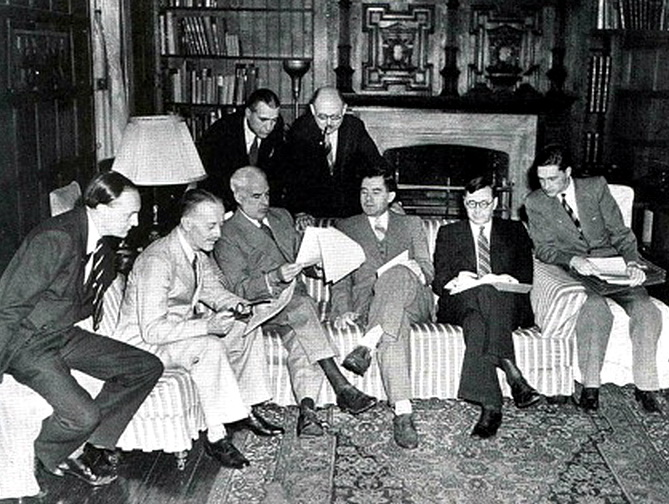
- Arkady Sobolev (seated, second from right) at the Dumbarton Oaks Conference, August 1944

Director of the Department of the UN Security Council Affairs
- In office 1946–1949

Ambassador to Polish People's Republic
- In office March 2, 1951 – June 21, 1953
- Preceded by: Viktor Lebedev
- Succeeded by: Georgy Popov

Permanent Representative of the Soviet Union to the United Nations
- In office 1955–1960
- Preceded by: Andrey Vyshinsky
- Succeeded by: Valerian Zorin

Personal details
- Born: November 25, 1903 Danilkovo village, Galichsky Uyezd, Kostroma Governorate, Russian Empire
- Died: December 1, 1964 (aged 61) Moscow, RSFSR, Soviet Union
- Party: CPSU

Arkady Alexandrovich Sobolev (Russian: Арка́дий Алекса́ндрович Со́болев, November 25, 1903 – December 1, 1964) was a Russian Soviet diplomat who served as the Soviet ambassador to the United Nations between 1955 and 1960. He was a specialist in international law. He was also under-secretary for Security and Political Affairs between 1946 and 1949 and Soviet Ambassador to Poland between 1951 and 1953. He died in Moscow following a long illness.

Sobolov was born in 1903 in Danilkovo village, Galichsky Uyezd, Russian Empire.

Alger Hiss, Secretary-General of the San Francisco Conference, where the UN Charter was drafted and signed, spoke about the role of Sobolev and US delegate Leo Pasvolsky: "they were the draftsmen of the Charter in San Francisco. Now, the outline had been written before; I'm talking about the specific language which is a very important part of any treaty, I think it was Pasvolsky and Sobolev who were really responsible for the form the Charter took." Sobolev and Pasvolsky had the primary responsibility to "put the various drafts together into a working text."
