= Averky Aristov =

Soviet politician and diplomat (1903–1973)

- Аверкий Аристов
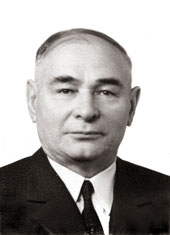

Soviet Ambassador to Austria
- In office 20 September 1971 – 11 July 1973
- Preceded by: Boris Podtserob
- Succeeded by: Mikhail Yefremov

Soviet Ambassador to Poland
- In office 1961–1971
- Preceded by: Peter Abrassimov
- Succeeded by: Stanislav Pilotovich

Senior Secretary of Cadres of the Communist Party of the Soviet Union
- In office 12 July 1955 – 17 December 1957
- Preceded by: Unknown.
- Succeeded by: Aleksey Kirichenko

Personal details
- Born: Averky Borisovich Aristov; 4 November [O.S. 22 October] 1903 Krasny Yar, Russian Empire
- Died: 11 July 1973 (aged 69) Vienna, Austria
- Party: Communist Party of the Soviet Union (1921–1973)
- Education: Leningrad Metallurgical Institute
- Profession: Metallurgical engineer
- Central institution membership: 1952–1953 & 1955–1961: Member, 18th, 19th Secretariat; 1952–1953 & 1957–1961: Full member, 19th, 20th Presidium; 1952–1971: Full Member, 19th, 20th, 22nd Central Committee.

Averky Borisovich Aristov (Russian: Аве́ркий Бори́сович А́ристов; 4 November 1903 – 11 July 1973) was a Soviet politician and diplomat.

== Biography ==
Born at Krasny Yar in Astrakhan Governorate, he was the son of a fisherman, working for a fishery from 1912 to 1919. In 1919 he joined the Komsomol and 1921 he became a member of the Communist Party of the Soviet Union. He served in the Red Army and worked as a metallurgist until 1940, when he began a rapid rise as a communist party official, filling posts left vacant by the mass arrests during the Great Purge. In 1940-46, he was a party secretary of the Sverdlovsk, Kemerovo and Krasnoyarsk regions. He was First Secretary of the Chelyabinsk Regional Party committee in 1946-50, and of the Krasnoyarsk regional party committee in 1950-52.

In October 1952, during the 19th Congress of the Soviet Communist Party, the last congress during the lifetime of Joseph Stalin, Aristov was transferred to Moscow, and appointed a member of the Presidium and a secretary of the Central Committee(one of ten), replacing Georgy Malenkov as the secretary in charge of party appointments. This was the post that Nikolai Yezhov held in 1936, before taking charge of the NKVD during the Great Purge. The historian Robert Conquest conjectured that "as a long shot we might guess that Aristov was destined to be Stalin's new police viceroy."

When Stalin died in March 1953 Malenkov temporarily took control, Aristov lost all of these positions and was demoted to a non-party job in Khabarovsk. He was promoted to the post of First Secretary of the Khabarovsk party committee in February 1954, as Nikita Khrushchev was gaining control of the communist party. In July 1955, he was recalled to Moscow and reappointed as one of six secretaries of the Central Committee. In July 1957, he was restored to full membership of the Presidium after the Anti-Party Group failed to oust Khruschev. In May 1960, he was removed from his post as secretary, though he still held a senior position as a member of the RSFSR Bureau, which supervised party affairs in the Russian republic.

In January 1961, Aristov was drastically demoted by being sent to Warsaw as Soviet ambassador to Poland. There appears to have been no political reason for his dismissal. The French journalist Michel Tatu, a close observer of Kremlin politics at the time, wrote that "the reason for his concealed dismissal are completely obscure." The problem may have been his attitude. According to Khrushchev's son, Sergei, "More than once I heard father express disappointment with Averky Borisovich Aristov: you start talking to him about business, and he always changes the subject to fishing."

In 1971-73, he was ambassador to Austria.

He was buried at the Novodevichy Cemetery, Moscow.

== See also ==
- Politics of the Soviet Union
