= Moscow Regional Committee of the Communist Party of the Soviet Union =

The Moscow Regional Committee of the Communist Party of the Soviet Union, commonly referred to as the Moscow CPSU obkom, was the position of highest authority in Moscow Oblast during most of the existence of the Soviet Union. The position was created on 24 January 1929 as the Central Industrial Oblast, and abolished on 29 August 1991 although most authority was lost in June that year to the position of Governor of Moscow Oblast. The First Secretary was a de facto appointed position usually by the Politburo or the General Secretary himself.

== First Secretaries ==
The following individuals served as first secretaries of the Moscow Regional Committee of the Communist Party of the Soviet Union.

| Name | Term of office | | Life years |
| Name | Start | End | Life years |
|---|---|---|---|
| Karl Bauman | 24 January 1929 | 22 April 1930 | 1892–1937 |
| Lazar Kaganovich | 22 April 1930 | 7 March 1935 | 1893–1991 |
| Nikita Khrushchev | 7 March 1935 | 10 February 1938 | 1894–1971 |
| Aleksandr Ugarov | 10 February 1938 | 2 November 1938 | 1900–1939 |
| Aleksandr Shcherbakov | 2 November 1938 | 10 May 1945 | 1901–1945 |
| Georgy Popov | 12 June 1945 | 16 December 1949 | 1906–1968 |
| Nikita Khrushchev | 16 December 1949 | 10 March 1953 | 1894–1971 |
| Nikolai Mikhailov | 10 March 1953 | 25 March 1954 | 1906–1982 |
| Ivan Kapitonov | 27 March 1954 | 2 March 1959 | 1915–2002 |
| Pyotr Demichev | 2 March 1959 | 6 July 1960 | 1918–2010 |
| Grigory Abramov | 6 July 1960 | January 1963 | 1918– |
| Vasily Konotop | 15 December 1964 | 16 November 1985 | 1916–1995 |
| Valentin Mesyats | 16 November 1985 | 14 December 1990 | 1928–2019 |
| Boris Balashov | 15 December 1990 | 29 August 1991 | 1941– |

== See also ==
- Governor of Moscow Oblast
- Moscow City Committee of the Communist Party of the Soviet Union

== Sources ==
- World Statesmen.org
