= Vladimir Brovikov =

Belarusian chairman (1931–1992)

Vladimir Ignatevich Brovikov (Belarusian: Уладзімір Ігнатавіч Бровікаў) (12 May 1931 – 10 February 1992) was the Chairman of the Council of Ministers of Byelorussian Soviet Socialist Republic from 8 July 1983 to 10 January 1986. He was preceded by Aleksandr Aksyonov and succeeded by Mikhail Kovalyov.
