= Georgy Popov (politician) =

Soviet diplomat (1906–1968)

- Георгий Попов
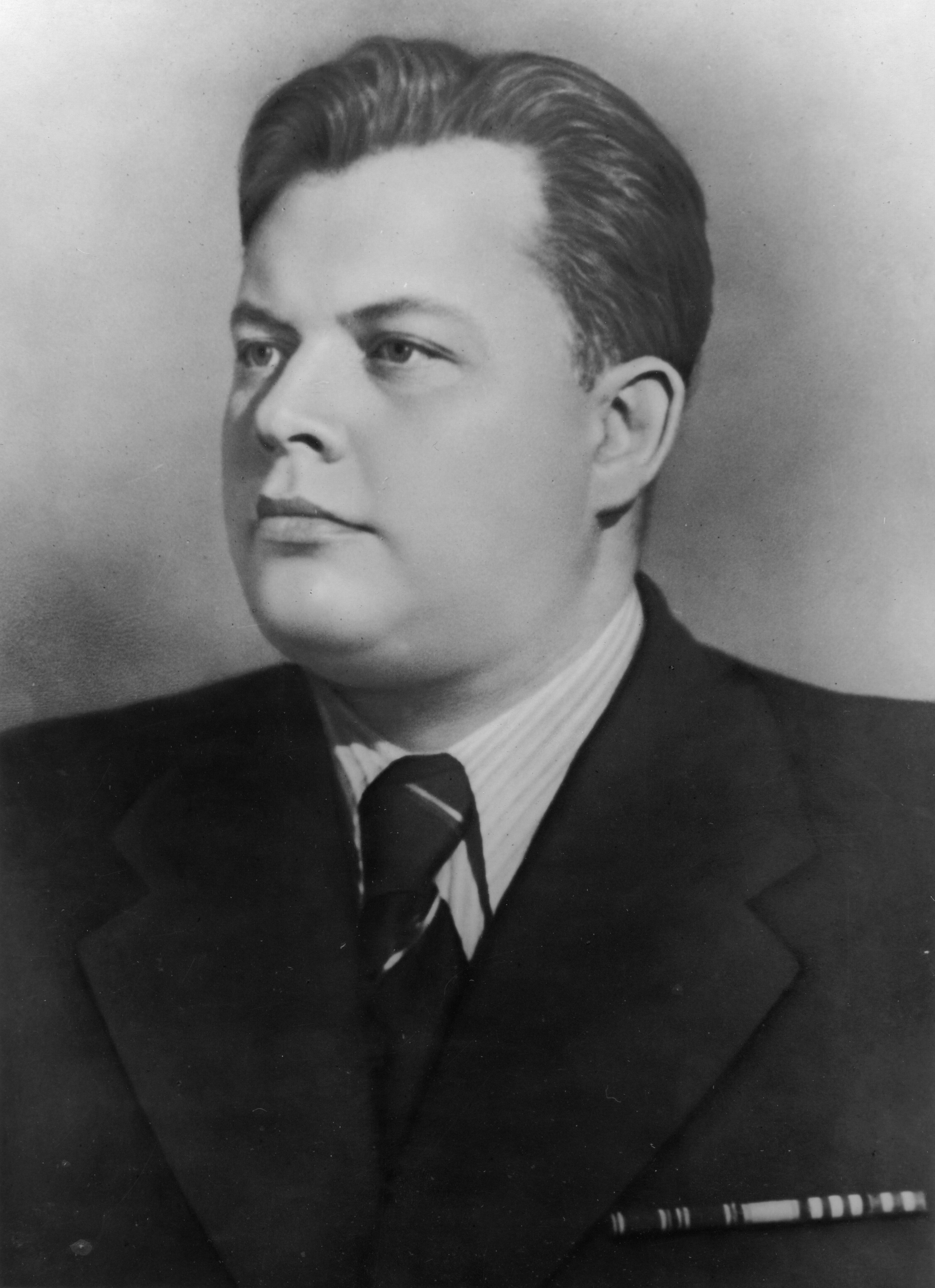
- Popov c. 1946

First Secretary of the Communist Party in Moscow
- In office 10 May 1945 – 12 February 1950
- Preceded by: Aleksandr Shcherbakov
- Succeeded by: Ivan Rumyantsev

Chairman of the Moscow City Council
- In office 7 December 1944 – 12 December 1949
- Preceded by: Vasily Pronin
- Succeeded by: Mikhail Yasnov

Soviet Ambassador to Poland
- In office 21 June 1953 – 27 March 1954
- Premier: Georgy Malenkov
- Preceded by: Arkady Sobolev
- Succeeded by: Nikolai Mikhailov

Minister of Agricultural Engineering
- In office 14 March 1951 – 31 December 1951
- Premier: Joseph Stalin
- Preceded by: Pyotr Goremykin
- Succeeded by: Sergei Stepanov

Minister of Urban Development
- In office 31 December 1949 – 14 March 1951
- Premier: Joseph Stalin
- Preceded by: Konstantin Sokolov
- Succeeded by: Office abolished

Personal details
- Born: 2 September 1906 Moscow
- Died: 14 January 1968 (aged 61) Moscow
- Resting place: Novodevichy Cemetery
- Citizenship: Soviet
- Party: Communist Party of the Soviet Union
- Education: Moscow Industrial Academy
- Awards: Order of Lenin, Order of the Red Banner of Labour

Georgy Mikhailovich Popov (Russian: Георгий Михайлович Попов) was a Soviet politician who served as Chairman of the Executive Committee of the Moscow City Council from 1944 to 1949 and as First Secretary of the Moscow City Committee of the Communist Party from 1945 to 1950. The former position was the de facto Mayor of Moscow, but the latter was the position of highest authority in the city.

== Biography ==
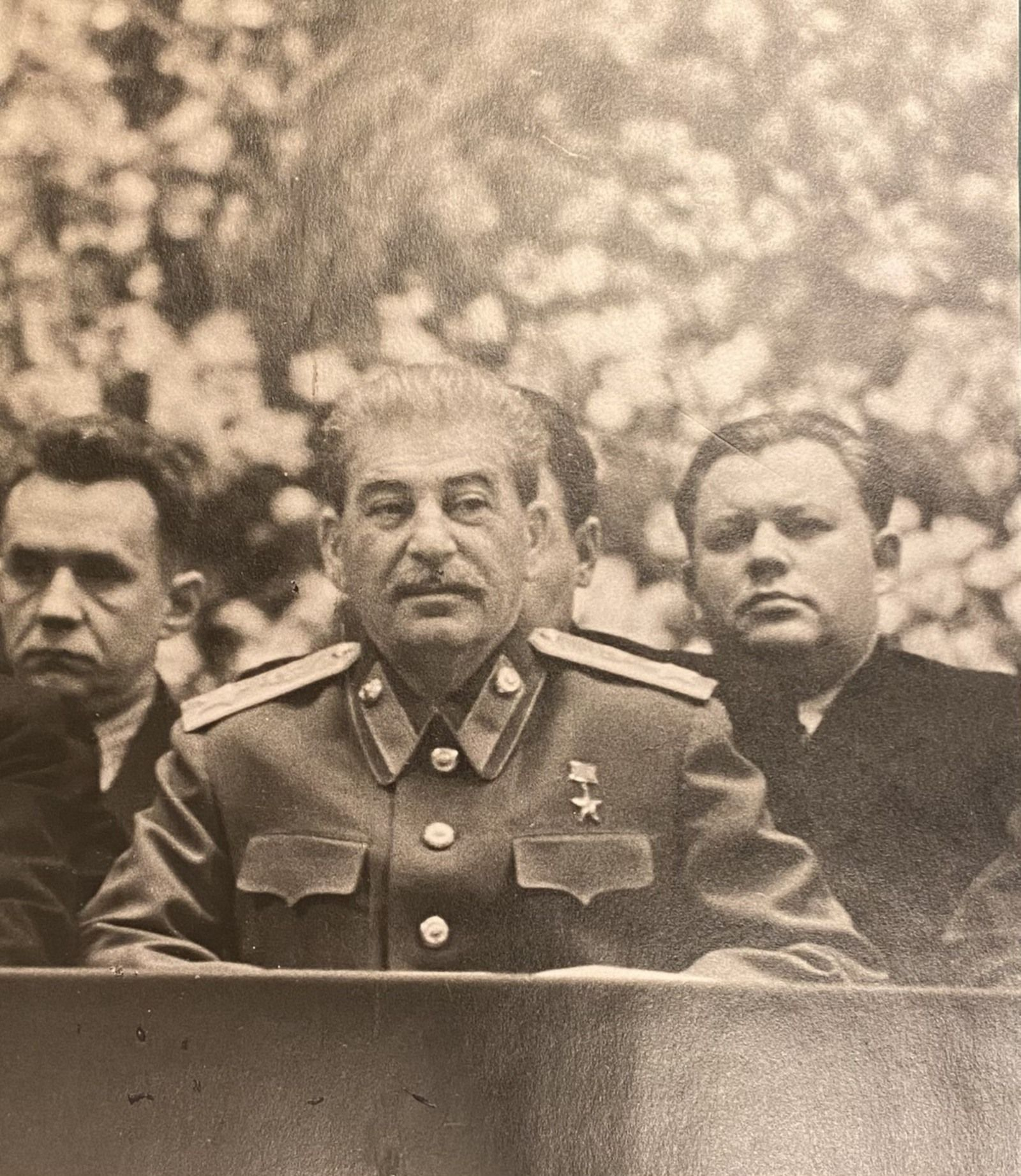
Popov (right) with Alexei Kosygin (left) and Joseph Stalin (middle), 1947

Born into the family of an workers. In the 1920s, at Komsomol work in the Tambov Oblast and the Tatar Autonomous Soviet Socialist Republic. From 1928 to 1938 he worked at the Central Institute of Labour in Moscow. In 1938 he graduated from the mechanical engineering department of the All-Union Industrial Academy. Since July 1938, instructor in the department of leading party bodies of the Central Committee of the All-Union Communist Party of Bolsheviks.

From November 1938 to 1945, second secretary of the Moscow City Committee of the All-Union Communist Party of Bolsheviks.

In July – October 1941 he was a member of the Military Council of the Reserve Front.

From December 7, 1944, to January 1950, chairman of the executive committee of the Moscow City Council of Workers' Deputies, and at the same time, after the death of Alexander Shcherbakov in 1945–1949, first secretary of the Moscow Committee and the Moscow City Committee of the Party. In 1946–1949, Secretary of the Central Committee of the All-Union Communist Party of Bolsheviks. He was the chairman of the government committee for preparing the celebration of the 800th anniversary of Moscow. Contributed to the career advancement of E. A. Furtseva in 1948.

From December 31, 1949, to March 14, 1951, Minister of Urban Construction of the USSR. From March 14, 1951, to December 31, 1951 – Minister of Agricultural Machinery of the USSR. In 1951–1953, director of the Frunze aviation plant in Samara.

From March 1953 to March 1954, the Ambassador Extraordinary and Plenipotentiary of the Soviet Union to the People's Republic of Poland. He was recalled from Warsaw and was criticized for his interference in the affairs of the Polish United Workers' Party. Popov, as noted in the corresponding resolution of the Presidium of the CPSU Central Committee, allowed an "arrogant attitude towards Polish comrades," which "could have caused serious damage to Soviet-Polish relations".

Since 1954, he again worked at enterprises in the aviation industry. Since 1959, director of the plant (Vladimir). Retired since 1965.

He was buried at the Novodevichy Cemetery in Moscow. He was married to Tatyana Viktorovna Fedorova.
