= Aleksandr Aksyonov (politician) =

Soviet politician

Aleksandr Nikiforovich Aksyonov (Russian: Алекса́ндр Ники́форович Аксёнов, Belarusian: Аляксандр Аксёнаў, Aleksandr Aksionau; 9 October 1924 – 8 September 2009) was a Soviet politician and diplomat from Belarus. Aksyonov served as the Prime Minister of the Byelorussian Soviet Socialist Republic from 11 December 1978, until 7 July 1983. He later became the Soviet Ambassador to Poland from 1983 to 1986. He was a member of the Central Committee for the Communist Party of Byelorussia from 1956 to 1986.

He was born on 9 October 1924 in Kuntorovka, Vyetka District, and he graduated secondary school in 1938. Aksyonov died on 8 September 2009, at the age of 84.
