= Central Committee of the 22nd Congress of the Communist Party of the Soviet Union =

The Central Committee of the 22nd Congress of the Communist Party of the Soviet Union was in session from 1961 until 1966. It elected, at its 1st Plenary Session, the 22nd Presidium, the 22nd Secretariat and the 22nd Party Control Committee of the Communist Party of the Soviet Union.

== Plenums ==
The Central Committee was not a permanent institution. It convened plenary sessions. 14 CC plenary sessions were held between the 22nd Congress and the 23rd Congress. When the CC was not in session, decision-making power was vested in the internal bodies of the CC itself; that is, the Politburo and the Secretariat. None of these bodies were permanent either; typically they convened several times a month.

Plenary sessions of the Central Committee
Plenum	Date	Length
1st Plenary Session	31 October 1961	1 day
2nd Plenary Session	5–9 March 1962	5 days
3rd Plenary Session	23 April 1962	1 day
4th Plenary Session	19–23 November 1962	5 days
5th Plenary Session	18–21 June 1963	4 days
6th Plenary Session	9–13 December 1963	4 days
7th Plenary Session	10–15 February 1964	6 days
8th Plenary Session	11 July 1964	6 days
9th Plenary Session	14 October 1964	1 day
10th Plenary Session	16 November 1964	1 day
11th Plenary Session	24–26 March 1965	3 days
12th Plenary Session	27–29 September 1965	3 days
13th Plenary Session	6 December 1965	1 day
14th Plenary Session	26 March 1966	1 day

== Composition ==
=== Members ===
Members of the Central Committee of the 22nd Congress of the Communist Party of the Soviet Union
Name	Cyrillic	20th CC	23rd CC	Birth	Death	PM	Ethnicity	Gender
Grigoriy Abramov	Григорий Абрамов	New	Not	1918	1968	1945	Russian	Male
Pyotr Abrasimov	Петр Абрасимов	New	Reelected	1912	2009	1940	Russian	Male
Aleksey Adzhubey	Алексей Аджубей	New	Removed	1924	1993	1953	Russian	Male
Sergey Afanseyev	Серге́й Афана́сьев	New	Reelected	1918	2001	1943	Russian	Male
Vali Akhundov	Вели Ахундов	New	Not	1916	1986	1939	Azerbaijani	Male
Yuri Andropov	Юрий Андропов	New	Reelected	1914	1984	1939	Russian	Male
Averky Aristov	Аверкий Аристов	Old	Reelected	1903	1973	1921	Russian	Male
Ivan Bagramyan	Иван Баграмян	Candidate	Reelected	1897	1982	1941	Armenian	Male
Alexander Basov	Александр Басов	New	Reelected	1912	1988	1945	Russian	Male
Ivan Benediktov	Иван Бенедиктов	Old	Reelected	1902	1983	1930	Russian	Male
Boris Beshchev	Борис Бещев	New	Reelected	1903	1981	1927	Russian	Male
Sergey Biryuzov	Серге́й Бирюзо́в	Candidate	Died	1904	1964	1926	Russian	Male
Ivan Bodiul	Иван Бодюл	New	Reelected	1918	2013	1940	Ukrainian	Male
Leonid Brezhnev	Леонид Брежнев	Old	Reelected	1906	1982	1931	Russian	Male
Vasily Chernyshev	Василий Чернышёв	Old	Reelected	1908	1969	1928	Russian	Male
Stepan Chervonenko	Степан Червоненко	New	Reelected	1915	2003	1940	Ukrainian	Male
Vasily Chuikov	Васи́лий Чуйко́в	Candidate	Reelected	1900	1982	1919	Russian	Male
Viktor Churayev	Виктор Чураев	Candidate	Reelected	1903	1982	1929	Russian	Male
Abdurakhman Daniyalov	Абдурахман Даниялов	Old	Reelected	1908	1981	1928	Avar	Male
Salken Daulenov	Салькен Дауленов	Old	Removed	1907	1984	1931	Russian	Male
Pyotr Dementev	Pyotr Dementev	Old	Reelected	1907	1977	1938	Russian	Male
Pyotr Demichev	Пётр Де́мичев	New	Reelected	1917	2010	1939	Russian	Male
Georgy Denisov	Георгий Денисов	Old	Candidate	1909	1996	1928	Russian	Male
Nikolay Dygay	Николай Дыгай	Candidate	Died	1908	1963	1929	Russian	Male
Veniamin Dymshits	Вениамин Дымшиц	New	Reelected	1910	1993	1937	Ukrainian	Male
Pyotr Fedoseyev	Петр Федосеев	New	Reelected	1908	1990	1939	Russian	Male
Vitaly Fokin	Виталий Фокин	New	Died	1906	1964	1927	Russian	Male
Yekaterina Furtseva	Екатерина Фурцева	Old	Reelected	1910	1974	1930	Russian	Female
Valentina Gaganova	Валентина Гаганова	New	Reelected	1932	2010	1949	Russian	Female
Konstantin Galanshin	Константин Галаншин	New	Reelected	1912	2011	1944	Russian	Male
Vasily Garbuzov	Василий Гарбузов	New	Reelected	1911	1985	1939	Russian	Male
Anton Gayevoy	Антон Гаевой	Old	Died	1907	1962	1930	Ukrainian	Male
Alexander Georgiev	Александр Георгиев	New	Reelected	1913	1976	1943	Ukrainian	Male
Filipp Golikov	Филипп Голиков	New	Not	1900	1980	1918	Russian	Male
Sergey Gorshkov	Серге́й Горшков	Candidate	Reelected	1910	1988	1942	Russian	Male
Fodor Goryachev	Фёдор Горячев	Old	Reelected	1905	1996	1927	Russian	Male
Andrei Grechko	Андре́й Гре́чко	Candidate	Reelected	1903	1976	1928	Ukrainian	Male
Konstantin Grishin	Константин Гришин	Candidate	Reelected	1908	1973	1931	Russian	Male
Viktor Grishin	Ви́ктор Гри́шин	Old	Reelected	1914	1992	1939	Russian	Male
Ivan Grishmanov	Иван Гришманов	New	Reelected	1906	1979	1936	Russian	Male
Andrei Gromyko	Андрей Громыко	Old	Reelected	1909	1989	1931	Belarusian	Male
Ivan Hrushetsky	Иван Грушецкий	New	Reelected	1904	1982	1928	Ukrainian	Male
Nikolai F. Ignatov	Николай Игнатов	Old	Not	1914	1967	1939	Russian	Male
Nikolai G. Ignatov	Никола́й Игна́тов	Old	Reelected	1901	1966	1924	Russian	Male
Leonid Illichev	Леонид Ильичёв	New	Not	1906	1990	1924	Russian	Male
Olga Ivaschenko	Ольга Иващенко	Candidate	Not	1906	1990	1928	Ukrainian	Female
Givi Javakhishvili	Гиви Джавахишвили	Old	Reelected	1912	1985	1941	Georgian	Male
Johannes Käbin	Йоха́ннес Кэ́бин	Old	Not	1905	1999	1927	Estonian	Male
Valery Kalmykov	Валерий Калмыков	Candidate	Reelected	1908	1974	1942	Russian	Male
Jānis Kalnbērziņš	Ян Калнбе́рзинь	Old	Reelected	1893	1986	1917	Latvian	Male
Ivan Kapitonov	Иван Капитонов	Old	Reelected	1915	2002	1939	Russian	Male
Vasily Kavun	Василий Кавун	Old	Reelected	1928	2009	1954	Ukrainian	Male
Ivan Kazanets	Иван Казанец	Candidate	Reelected	1918	2013	1944	Ukrainian	Male
Mstislav Keldysh	Мстислав Келдыш	Old	Reelected	1911	1978	1949	Russian	Male
Nikita Khrushchev	Никита Хрущёв	Old	Retired	1894	1971	1918	Russian	Male
Andrei Kirilenko	Андре́й Кириле́нко	Old	Reelected	1906	1990	1930	Ukrainian	Male
Ivan Kiselov	Иван Киселёв	New	Reelected	1917	2004	1944	Russian	Male
Tikhon Kiselyov	Ти́хон Киселёв	New	Reelected	1917	1983	1940	Belarusian	Male
Vasily Klimenko	Василий Клименко	Old	Reelected	1906	1984	1929	Ukrainian	Male
Aleksandr Kokarev	Александр Кокарев	New	Reelected	1909	1991	1938	Ukrainian	Male
Vasily Komyakhov	Василь Комяхов	Candidate	Reelected	1911	1966	1941	Russian	Male
Ivan Konev	Иван Конев	Old	Reelected	1897	1973	1918	Russian	Male
Vasily Konotop	Василий Конотоп	Promoted	Reelected	1916	1995	1944	Ukrainian	Male
Nikolay Konovalov	Никола́й Конова́лов	New	Reelected	1907	1993	1929	Russian	Male
Oleksandr Korniychuk	Александр Корнейчук	Old	Reelected	1905	1972	1940	Ukrainian	Male
Nikolay Korytkov	Николай Корытков	New	Reelected	1910	2000	1939	Russian	Male
Anatoly Kostousov	Анатолий Костоусов	Candidate	Reelected	1906	1985	1925	Russian	Male
Alexei Kosygin	Алексей Косыгин	Old	Reelected	1904	1980	1927	Russian	Male
Alexander Kovalenko	Александр Коваленко	New	Reelected	1909	1987	1931	Ukrainian	Male
Yevgeny Kozhevnikov	Евгений Кожевников	New	Reelected	1905	1979	1942	Russian	Male
Frol Kozlov	Фрол Козлов	Old	Died	1908	1965	1926	Russian	Male
Mikhail Krakhmalov	Михаил Крахмалёв	Candidate	Reelected	1914	1977	1939	Russian	Male
Aleksey Krylov	Алексей Крылов	New	Not	1908	?	1943	Russian	Male
Nikolay Krylov	Никола́й Крыло́в	New	Reelected	1903	1972	1927	Russian	Male
Vladimir Kucherenko	Владимир Кучеренко	Old	Died	1909	1963	1942	Russian	Male
Pavel Kuchumov	Павел Кучумов	New	Not	1904	1987	1929	Russian	Male
Fyodor Kulakov	Фёдор Кулаков	New	Reelected	1918	1978	1940	Russian	Male
Dinmukhamed Kunaev	Дінмұхаммед Қонаев	Old	Reelected	1912	1993	1939	Kazakh	Male
Rakhmankul Kurbanov	Рахманкул Курбанов	New	Reelected	1912	2012	1940	Uzbek	Male
Otto Kuusinen	Отто Куусинен	Old	Died	1881	1964	1918	Finn	Male
Vasily Kuznetsov	Василий Кузнецов	Old	Reelected	1901	1990	1927	Russian	Male
Ivan Lutak	Иван Лутак	Promoted	Reelected	1919	2009	1940	Ukrainian	Male
Mikhail Lesechko	Михаил Лесечко	New	Reelected	1909	1984	1940	Ukrainian	Male
Rodion Malinovsky	Родио́н Малино́вский	Old	Reelected	1898	1967	1926	Ukrainian	Male
Nikolay Manukovskity	Николай Мануковский	New	Reelected	1926	1995	1951	Russian	Male
Sergey Manyakin	Сергей Манякин	New	Reelected	1923	2010	1945	Russian	Male
Pyotr Masherov	Пётр Машеров	Promoted	Reelected	1918	1980	1943	Belarusian	Male
Kirill Mazurov	Кири́лл Ма́зуров	Old	Reelected	1914	1989	1940	Belarusian	Male
Nikolai Mikhailov	Николай Михайлов	Old	Reelected	1906	1982	1930	Russian	Male
Anastas Mikoyan	Анастас Микоян	Old	Reelected	1895	1978	1915	Armenian	Male
Leonid Monashev	Леонид Монашев	New	Reelected	1914	1995	1939	Russian	Male
Kirill Moskalenko	Кирилл Москаленко	Old	Reelected	1902	1985	1926	Ukrainian	Male
Nuritdin Mukhitdinov	Нуритди́н Мухитди́нов	Old	Not	1917	2008	1938	Uzbek	Male
Alexander Murysev	Александр Мурысев	New	Died	1915	1962	1942	Belarusian	Male
Vasil Mzhavanadze	Василий Мжаванадзе	Old	Reelected	1902	1988	1927	Georgian	Male
Yadgar Nasriddinova	Ядгар Насриддинова	Old	Reelected	1920	2006	1942	Uzbek	Female
Tatyana Nikolayeva	Татьяна Николаева	New	Reelected	1919	2022	1940	Russian	Female
Ignaty Novikov	Игнатий Новиков	New	Reelected	1906	1993	1926	Ukrainian	Male
Vladimir Novikov	Владимир Новиков	New	Reelected	1907	2000	1936	Russian	Male
Ziya Nuriyev	Зия Нуриев	New	Reelected	1915	2012	1939	Bashkir	Male
Nikolay Organov	Николай Органов	Old	Reelected	1901	1982	1925	Russian	Male
Balysh Ovezov	Балыш Овезов	New	Reelected	1915	1975	1939	Turkmen	Male
Nikolai Patolichev	Николай Патоличев	Old	Reelected	1908	1989	1928	Russian	Male
Sergey Pavlov	Серге́й Па́влов	New	Reelected	1929	1993	1954	Russian	Male
Nikolai Pegov	Георгий Павлов	Old	Reelected	1905	1991	1939	Ukrainian	Male
Arvīds Pelše	А́рвид Пе́льше	New	Reelected	1899	1983	1915	Latvian	Male
Nikolai Podgorny	Никола́й Подго́рный	Old	Reelected	1903	1983	1930	Ukrainian	Male
Vasily Polyakov	Василий Конотоп	Promoted	Not	1913	2003	1939	Russian	Male
Dmitry Polyansky	Дми́трий Поля́нский	Old	Reelected	1917	2001	1939	Ukrainian	Male
Boris Ponomarev	Борис Пономарёв	Old	Reelected	1905	1995	1919	Russian	Male
Georgy Popov	Георгий Попов	Promoted	Reelected	1912	1984	1942	Russian	Male
Nina Popova	Нина Попова	Candidate	Reelected	1908	1994	1932	Russian	Female
Pyotr Pospelov	Пётр Поспелов	Old	Reelected	1898	1979	1916	Russian	Male
Sergey Pritytsky	Серге́й Притыцкий	New	Reelected	1913	1971	1932	Belarusian	Male
Alexander Puzanov	Александр Пузанов	Old	Reelected	1906	1998	1925	Russian	Male
Konstantin Pysin	Константин Пысин	Old	Reelected	1910	1987	1925	Russian	Male
Sharof Rashidov	Шараф Рашидов	Candidate	Reelected	1917	1983	1939	Uzbek	Male
Dzhabar Rasulov	Джабар Расулов	New	Reelected	1913	1982	1934	Tajik	Male
Pyotr Rozenko	Пётр Розенко	New	Candidate	1907	1991	1943	Ukrainian	Male
Alexander Rudakov	Алекса́ндр Рудако́в	Promoted	Reelected	1910	1966	1931	Russian	Male
Roman Rudenko	Рома́н Руде́нко	Candidate	Reelected	1907	1981	1926	Russian	Male
Konstantin Rudnev	Константин Руднев	New	Reelected	1911	1980	1941	Russian	Male
Aleksey Rumyantsev	Алексей Румянцев	Old	Reelected	1905	1993	1940	Russian	Male
Vasily Ryabikov	Васи́лий Ря́биков	New	Reelected	1907	1974	1925	Russian	Male
Pavel Satyukov	Павел Сатюков	New	Not	1911	1976	1939	Russian	Male
Vladimir Semichastny	Влади́мир Семича́стный	Promoted	Reelected	1924	2001	1944	Russian	Male
Ivan Senin	Иван Сенин	Candidate	Not	1903	1981	1920	Ukrainian	Male
Zinovie Serdiuk	Зиновий Сердюк	Old	Not	1903	1982	1925	Ukrainian	Male
Volodymyr Shcherbytsky	Влади́мир Щерби́цкий	New	Reelected	1918	1990	1948	Ukrainian	Male
Semon Shchetinin	Семён Щетинин	New	Reelected	1910	1975	1932	Russian	Male
Alexander Shelepin	Алекса́ндр Шеле́пин	Old	Reelected	1918	1994	1940	Russian	Male
Petro Shelest	Петро Шелест	New	Reelected	1908	1996	1928	Ukrainian	Male
Aleksandra Shevchenko	Александра Шевченко	New	Candidate	1926	2000	1954	Ukrainian	Female
Aleksey Shibayev	Алексей Шибаев	New	Reelected	1915	1991	1940	Russian	Male
Aleksey Shitikov	Алексе́й Ши́тиков	New	Reelected	1912	1993	1939	Russian	Male
Aleksey Shkolnikov	Алексей Шко́льников	Old	Reelected	1914	2003	1940	Russian	Male
Mikhail Sholokhov	Михаил Шолохов	New	Reelected	1905	1984	1932	Russian	Male
Viktor Shurygin	Виктор Шурыгин	New	Not	1913	1981	1941	Russian	Male
Nikolai Shvernik	Никола́й Шве́рник	Old	Reelected	1888	1970	1905	Russian	Male
Mikhail Sinitsa	Михаил Синица	New	Reelected	1913	1985	1942	Ukrainian	Male
Gennady Sizov	Геннадий Сизов	Promoted	Not	1903	1991	1926	Russian	Male
Vladimir Skryabin	Владимир Скрябин	New	Not	1908	1988	1928	Russian	Male
Efim P. Slavsky	Ефи́м Сла́вский	New	Reelected	1898	1991	1918	Russian	Male
Leonid Smirnov	Леонид Смирнов	New	Reelected	1916	2001	1943	Russian	Male
Antanas Sniečkus	Антанас Снечкус	Old	Reelected	1903	1974	1920	Lithuanian	Male
Nikolay Sobol	Николай Со́боль	New	Reelected	1910	1991	1939	Ukrainian	Male
Tikhon Sokovlev	Ти́хон Соколо́в	New	Reelected	1913	1992	1941	Russian	Male
Mikhail Solomentsev	Михаи́л Соло́менцев	New	Reelected	1913	2008	1940	Russian	Male
Leonid Solovyov	Леони́д Соловьёв	Candidate	Reelected	1906	1993	1929	Russian	Male
Ivan Spiridnov	Ива́н Спиридо́нов	New	Reelected	1905	1991	1928	Russian	Male
Sergey Stepanov	Сергей Степанов	Candidate	Not	1903	1976	1928	Russian	Male
Fodor Surganov	Фёдор Сурганов	Candidate	Reelected	1911	1976	1940	Belarusian	Male
Mikhail Suslov	Михаил Суслов	Old	Reelected	1902	1982	1921	Russian	Male
Fikryat Tabeyev	Фикрят Табеев	New	Reelected	1928	2015	1957	Russian	Male
Fedor Titov	Фёдор Титов	Old	Reelected	1910	1989	1930	Tatar	Male
Vitaly Titov	Виталий Титов	Old	Reelected	1907	1980	1938	Ukrainian	Male
Vasily Tolstikov	Василий Толстиков	New	Reelected	1917	2003	1948	Russian	Male
Nikita Tolubeyev	Никита Толубеев	New	Not	1922	2013	1947	Ukrainian	Male
Dmitriy Ustinov	Дми́трий Усти́нов	Old	Reelected	1908	1984	1927	Russian	Male
Turdakun Usubaliev	Турдакун Усубалиев	New	Not	1919	2015	1945	Kyrghyz	Male
Konstantin Vershinin	Константин Вершинин	New	Reelected	1900	1973	1919	Russian	Male
Alexander Volkov	Александр Волков	Candidate	Reelected	1910	1990	1931	Russian	Male
Georgiy Vorobyev	Георгий Воробьёв	New	Not	1914	2002	1939	Russian	Male
Feodosy Voronov	Феодо́сий Во́ронов	Candidate	Reelected	1904	1975	1927	Russian	Male
Gennady Voronov	Геннадий Воронов	Old	Reelected	1910	1994	1931	Russian	Male
Ivan Yakubovsky	Ива́н Якубо́вский	New	Not	1912	1976	1937	Belarusian	Male
Mikhail Yasnov	Михаил Яснов	Old	Reelected	1906	1991	1925	Russian	Male
Leonid Yefremov	Леонид Ефремов	Old	Reelected	1912	2007	1941	Russian	Male
Mikhail Yefremov	Михаил Ефремов	Old	Reelected	1911	2000	1931	Russian	Male
Nikolay Yegorychev	Никола́й Его́рычев	New	Reelected	1920	2005	1942	Russian	Male
Vyacheslav Yelyutin	Вячеслав Елю́тин	New	Reelected	1907	1993	1929	Russian	Male
Georgy Yenyutin	Георгий Енютин	Old	Not	1903	1969	1924	Russian	Male
Alexei Yepishev	Алексей Епишев	Promoted	Reelected	1908	1985	1929	Russian	Male
Viktor Yermilov	Виктор Ермилов	New	Not	1909	1982	1946	Russian	Male
Ivan Yunak	Иван Юнак	New	Reelected	1918	1995	1944	Ukrainian	Male
Matvei Zakharov	Матве́й Заха́ров	New	Reelected	1898	1972	1917	Russian	Male
Yakov Zarobyan	Яков Заробян	New	Not	1908	1980	1932	Armenian	Male
Alexander Zasyadko	Александр Засядько	New	Died	1910	1963	1931	Ukrainian	Male
Ivan Zhegalin	Ива́н Жега́лин	Old	Not	1906	1984	1926	Russian	Male
Vladimir Zhigalin	Владимир Жигалин	Promoted	Reelected	1907	1990	1931	Russian	Male
Valerian Zorin	Валериан Зорин	Candidate	Reelected	1902	1986	1922	Russian	Male

=== Candidates ===
Candidate Members of the Central Committee of the 22nd Congress of the Communist Party of the Soviet Union
Name	Cyrillic	20th CC	23rd CC	Birth	Death	PM	Ethnicity	Gender
Malik Abdurazakov	Малик Абдуразаков	New	Candidate	1919	1973	1940	Uzbek	Male
Evgeniy Afanasenko	Евге́ний Афана́сенко	New	Not	1914	1993	1943	Russian	Male
Pavel Afanasyev	Афана́сьев Я́ковлевич	New	Candidate	1905	1989	1925	Russian	Male
Abdy Annaliyev	Абды Анналиев	New	Not	1920	2007	1944	Turkmen	Male
Aleksey Antonov	Алексей Антонов	New	Candidate	1912	2010	1940	Russian	Male
Vasily Antonov	Василий Антонов	New	Candidate	1914	1967	1937	Russian	Male
Shmavon Arushanyan	Шмавон Арушанян	New	Not	1903	1982	1926	Armenian	Male
Viktor Bakayev	Виктор Бакаев	New	Candidate	1902	1987	1919	Russian	Male
Pavel Batitsky	Павел Фёдорович Батицкий	New	Member	1910	1984	1938	Ukrainian	Male
Vladimir Bazovsky	Владимир Базовский	New	Candidate	1917	1993	1942	Russian	Male
Masymkhan Beysebayev	Масымхан Бейсебаев	New	Member	1908	1987	1932	Kazakh	Male
Alexander Borisov	Александр Бори́сов	New	Not	1908	2001	1939	Russian	Male
Semyon Borisov	Семён Борисов	Candidate	Not	1911	1999	1932	Yakut	Male
Konstantin Brekhov	Константи́н Бре́хов	New	Candidate	1907	1994	1931	Russian	Male
Nikita Bubnovsky	Никита Бубновский	Candidate	Candidate	1907	1997	1939	Ukrainian	Male
Semyon Budyonny	Семён Будённый	Candidate	Candidate	1883	1973	1919	Russian	Male
Alexander Bukharov	Александр Бухаров	New	Not	1912	?	1942	Russian	Male
Aleksandr Bulgakov	Александр Булгаков	New	Candidate	1907	1996	1937	Ukrainian	Male
Boris Butoma	Бутома Евстафьевич	New	Member	1907	1976	1928	Ukrainian	Male
Andrei Chabanenko	Андрей Чабаненко	New	Not	1909	1986	1932	Russian	Male
Georgy Denisov	Георгий Денисов	New	Candidate	1910	2005	1930	Russian	Male
Alexandru Diordiță	Александр Диордица	New	Candidate	1911	1996	1938	Moldovan	Male
Yevgeniya Dolinyuk	Евге́ния Долиню́к	New	Not	1914	1990	1953	Ukrainian	Female
Anatoly Drygin	Анатолий Дрыгин	New	Candidate	1914	1990	1940	Russian	Male
Viktor Fedorov	Ви́ктор Фёдоров	New	Candidate	1912	1990	1939	Russian	Male
Vasiliy Filippov	Василий Филиппов	New	Not	1913	1993	1936	Buryat	Male
Nikolay Firyubin	Николай Фирюбин	Candidate	Not	1908	1983	1929	Russian	Male
Leonid Florentyev	Леонид Флорентьев	Candidate	Member	1911	2003	1939	Russian	Male
Georgy Frantsov	Юрий Францев	New	Candidate	1903	1969	1940	Russian	Male
Vasily Frolov	Василий Фролов	New	Candidate	1914	1994	1944	Russian	Male
Mikhail Gavrilov	Михаил Гаврилов	New	Not	1910	1979	1931	Russian	Male
Konstantin Gerasimov	Константин Гера́симов	New	Candidate	1910	1982	1939	Russian	Male
Andrei Getman	Андрей Гетман	New	Candidate	1903	1987	1927	Ukrainian	Male
Nikolai Gribachev	Николай Грибачёв	New	Candidate	1910	1992	1943	Russian	Male
Ivan Gustov	Иван Густов	New	Candidate	1911	1996	1932	Russian	Male
Aleksandr Ishkov	Александр Ишков	Candidate	Candidate	1905	1988	1927	Russian	Male
Mammad Iskenderov	Мамед Искендеров	New	Not	1915	1985	1943	Kurd	Male
Semon Islyukov	Семён Ислюков	Candidate	Candidate	1915	1998	1939	Russian	Male
Oleksandr Ivashchenko	Александр Иващенко	New	Not	1916	?	1944	Ukrainian	Male
Ivan Kairov	Ива́н Каи́ров	New	Not	1893	1978	1917	Russian	Male
Abdulakhad Kakharov	Абдулахад Кахаров	New	Candidate	1913	1984	1939	Tajik	Male
Nikifor Kalchenko	Никифор Ка́льченко	Member	Candidate	1906	1989	1932	Ukrainian	Male
Andrey Kandrenkov	Андре́й Кандрёнков	New	Candidate	1915	1989	1939	Russian	Male
Vladimir Karlov	Влади́мир Ка́рлов	New	Candidate	1914	1994	1940	Russian	Male
Mikhail Kazakov	Михаил Казаков	New	Candidate	1901	1979	1919	Russian	Male
Stepan Khitrov	Степан Хитров	New	Member	1910	1999	1932	Russian	Male
Narmahonmadi Khudayberdyyev	Нармахонмади Худайбердыев	New	Not	1928	2011	1948	Uzbek	Male
Vladimir Kirillin	Владимир Кириллин	New	Member	1913	1999	1937	Russian	Male
Valter Klauson	Вальтер Клаусон	New	Candidate	1913	1988	1943	Estonian	Male
Aleksandr Klimov	Александр Климов	Candidate	Candidate	1914	1979	1939	Russian	Male
Anton Kochinyan	Анто́н Кочиня́н	New	Member	1913	1989	1931	Armenian	Male
Olga Kolchina	Ольга Колчина	New	Candidate	1918	2017	1946	Russian	Female
Fedor Kolomiyets	Фёдор Коломиец	New	Not	1910	1994	1939	Ukrainian	Male
Vasily Konotop	Василий Конотоп	New	Promoted	1916	1995	1944	Ukrainian	Male
Leonid Korniyets	Леони́д Рома́нович Корни́ец	Candidate	Candidate	1901	1969	1926	Ukrainian	Male
Aleksey Kortunov	Алексе́й Кортуно́в	New	Candidate	1907	1973	1939	Russian	Male
Pyotr Koshevoy	Пётр Кошевой	New	Candidate	1904	1976	1925	Ukrainian	Male
Ivan Koval	Иван Коваль	New	Candidate	1910	1996	1938	Ukrainian	Male
Pavel Kovanov	Павел Кованов	New	Candidate	1907	1986	1940	Russian	Male
Nikolay Kozinets	Николай Козинец	New	Not	1910	?	1942	Russian	Male
Vasily Kozlov	Василий Козлов	Candidate	Member	1903	1967	1927	Belarusian	Male
Pavel Kozyr	Па́вел Ко́зырь	New	Candidate	1913	1999	1939	Ukrainian	Male
Viktor Krotov	Виктор Кротов	New	Not	1912	1986	1944	Russian	Male
Pavel Kumykin	Павел Кумыкин	Candidate	Not	1901	1976	1921	Russian	Male
Sergey Kurashov	Сергей Курашов	New	Died	1910	1965	1938	Russian	Male
Anton Kuzmich	Антон Кузьмич	New	Not	1908	1989	1936	Belarusian	Male
Mikhail Lavrentyev	Михаи́л Лавре́нтьев	New	Candidate	1900	1980	1952	Russian	Male
Pavel Leonov	Павел Леонов	New	Candidate	1918	1992	1944	Russian	Male
Fodor Loshchenkov	Фодор Лощенков	New	Candidate	1915	2009	1943	Russian	Male
Ivan Lutak	Иван Лутак	New	Promoted	1919	2009	1940	Ukrainian	Male
Lidia Lykova	Лидия Лыкова	Candidate	Candidate	1913	2016	1938	Russian	Female
Timbora Malbakhov	Тимбо́ра Мальба́хов	New	Candidate	1917	1999	1942	Kabardian	Male
Nikolay Mamay	Мамай Яковлевич	New	Not	1926	1989	1955	Russian	Male
Bolot Mambetov	Болот Мамбетов	New	Candidate	1907	1990	1929	Kyrgyz	Male
Ivan Marchenko	Иван Марченко	Member	Not	1908	1972	1929	Russian	Male
Pyotr Masherov	Пётр Машеров	New	Promoted	1918	1980	1943	Belarusian	Male
Nikolay Melnikov	Николай Мельников	New	Not	1918	1973	1939	Russian	Male
Mikhail Menshikov	Михаи́л Ме́ньшиков	Candidate	Not	1902	1976	1927	Russian	Male
Mirzamakhmud Musakhanov	Мирзамахмуд Мусаханов	New	Candidate	1912	1995	1943	Uzbek	Male
Aleksei Müürisepp	Алексей Мюрисепп	New	Not	1902	1970	1939	Estonian	Male
Konstantin Nikolayev	Константин Николаев	New	Member	1910	1972	1940	Russian	Male
Konstantin Novikov	Константин Новиков	New	Candidate	1910	1974	1932	Russian	Male
Mikhail Olshanskity	Михаил Ольша́нский	New	Not	1908	1988	1932	Russian	Male
Georgy Orlov	Гео́ргий Орло́в	Candidate	Not	1903	1991	1940	Russian	Male
Georgy Osipov	Георгий Осипов	New	Candidate	1906	1980	1927	Russian	Male
Justas Paleckis	Ю́стас Пале́цкис	Candidate	Candidate	1899	1980	1940	Lithuanian	Male
Borys Paton	Бори́с Пато́н	New	Member	1918	2020	1952	Ukrainian	Male
Georgy Pavlov	Гео́ргий Па́влов	New	Candidate	1910	1991	1939	Russian	Male
Valentin Penkovsky	Валенти́н Пенько́вский	New	Candidate	1904	1969	1926	Belarusian	Male
Boris Petukhov	Борис Петухов	New	Candidate	1913	1979	1940	Russian	Male
Jānis Peive	Ян Пейве	New	Not	1906	1976	1940	Latvian	Male
Mikhail Pimenov	Михаил Пименов	New	Not	1914	?	1940	Russian	Male
Issa Pliyev	Исса Плиев	New	Not	1903	1979	1926	Ossetian	Male
Mikhail Polekhin	Михаил Полёхин	New	Not	1913	?	1940	Russian	Male
Dmitry Polikarpov	Дми́трий Полика́рпов	New	Died	1905	1965	1924	Russian	Male
Ivan Polyakov	Ива́н Поляко́в	New	Member	1914	2004	1949	Belarusian	Male
Vasily Polyakov	Васи́лий Поляко́в	New	Promoted	1914	2004	1939	Russian	Male
Mikhail Ponomarev	Михаил Пономарёв	New	Candidate	1918	2001	1939	Russian	Male
Georgy Popov	Георгий Попов	New	Promoted	1912	1984	1942	Russian	Male
Sergey Postovalov	Сергей Постовалов	Candidate	Candidate	1907	1983	1930	Russian	Male
Mikhail Privalov	Михайло Привалов	New	Not	1913	2004	1944	Russian	Male
Nikolay Psurtsev	Николай Псурцев	New	Candidate	1900	1980	1919	Russian	Male
Georgy Pushkin	Георгий Пушкин	New	Died	1909	1963	1939	Russian	Male
Sergey Puzikov	Серге́й Пу́зиков	New	Died	1916	1962	1939	Russian	Male
Nikolai Rodionov	Никола́й Родио́нов	New	Member	1915	1999	1944	Russian	Male
Konstantin Rokossovsky	Константин Рокоссовский	New	Candidate	1896	1968	1917	Polish	Male
Aleksey Romanov	Алексе́й Рома́нов	New	Candidate	1908	1998	1939	Russian	Male
Alexander Rudakov	Алекса́ндр Рудако́в	Candidate	Promoted	1910	1966	1931	Russian	Male
Sergei Rudenko	Серге́й Руде́нко	New	Not	1904	1990	1928	Ukrainian	Male
Yevgeny Savitsky	Евгений Савицкий	New	Not	1910	1990	1931	Russian	Male
Vadim Sayushev	Вади́м Са́юшев	New	Not	1930	Alive	1951	Russian	Male
Ivan Semenov	Иван Семёнов	New	Not	1925	1982	1945	Russian	Male
Valentin Semenov	Валенти́н Семёнов	New	Not	1911	1988	1945	Russian	Male
Vladimir Semichastny	Влади́мир Семича́стный	Candidate	Promoted	1924	2001	1944	Russian	Male
Nikolay Semyonov	Никола́й Семёнов	New	Not	1896	1986	1947	Russian	Male
Ivan Serbin	Иван Сербин	New	Candidate	1910	1981	1931	Russian	Male
Boris Shcherbina	Борис Щербина	New	Candidate	1919	1990	1939	Ukrainian	Male
Aleksandr Shokin	Алекса́ндр Шо́кин	New	Member	1909	1988	1936	Russian	Male
Gennady Sizov	Геннадий Сизов	Candidate	Promoted	1903	1991	1926	Russian	Male
Semon Skachkov	Семён Скачков	New	Candidate	1907	1996	1936	Ukrainian	Male
Anatoly Skochilov	Анатолий Скочилов	New	Member	1912	1977	1940	Russian	Male
Igor Skulkov	Игорь Скулков	Candidate	Candidate	1913	1971	1932	Russian	Male
Aleksandr Smirnov	Александр Смирнов	New	Candidate	1912	1997	1937	Russian	Male
Nikolay Smirnov	Николай Смирнов	Candidate	Died	1906	1962	1931	Russian	Male
Nikolay Smirnov	Николай Смирнов	New	Not	1904	1974	1947	Russian	Male
Vasily Smirnov	Василий Смирно́в	New	Candidate	1905	1979	1925	Russian	Male
Vasily Sokolovsky	Васи́лий Соколо́вский	Member	Candidate	1897	1968	1931	Russian	Male
Vladimir Sotnikov	Владимир Сотников	New	Not	1910	1990	1940	Russian	Male
Vasily Stepanov	Василий Степанов	New	Not	1905	1981	1926	Russian	Male
Nikolay Strokin	Николай Строкин	Candidate	Not	1906	1972	1950	Russian	Male
Alexander Struyev	Алекса́ндр Стру́ев	Member	Member	1906	1991	1927	Ukrainian	Male
Andrey Stuchenko	Андре́й Стуче́нко	New	Candidate	1904	1972	1929	Ukrainian	Male
Vladimir Sudets	Владимир Судец	New	Not	1904	1981	1924	Ukrainian	Male
Motiejus Šumauskas	Мотеюс Шумаускас	Candidate	Candidate	1905	1982	1924	Lithuanian	Male
Aleksey Surkov	Алексе́й Сурко́в	Candidate	Not	1899	1983	1925	Russian	Male
Alexander Tarasov	Алекса́ндр Тара́сов	New	Candidate	1911	1975	1940	Russian	Male
Nikolai Tikhonov	Николай Тихонов	New	Member	1905	1997	1940	Russian	Male
Vadim Tikunov	Вади́м Тикуно́в	New	Candidate	1921	1980	1942	Russian	Male
Semyon Timoshenko	Семён Тимоше́нко	Candidate	Candidate	1895	1970	1919	Ukrainian	Male
Salchak Toka	Салчак Тока	Candidate	Candidate	1901	1973	1944	Tuvan	Male
Aleksandr Tvardovsky	Алекса́ндр Твардо́вский	New	Not	1910	1971	1940	Russian	Male
Sergey Varentsov	Серге́й Варенцо́в	New	Removed	1901	1971	1941	Russian	Male
Oleksiy Vatchenko	Алексе́й Ва́тченко	New	Member	1914	1984	1940	Ukrainian	Male
Praskovya Voronina	Праско́вья Воро́нина	New	Not	1918	?	1942	Russian	Female
Vasily Yemelyanov	Васи́лий Емелья́нов	New	Not	1901	1988	1919	Russian	Male
Alexei Yepishev	Алексей Епишев	Candidate	Promoted	1908	1985	1929	Russian	Male
Lev Yermin	Ле́в Е́рмин	New	Candidate	1923	2004	1943	Russian	Male
Andrey Yeryomenko	Андре́й Ерёменко	New	Candidate	1892	1970	1918	Ukrainian	Male
Ismail Yusupov	Исмаил Юсу́пов	New	Not	1914	2005	1939	Uyghur	Male
Mikhail Zakharov	Михаил Захаров	New	Candidate	1918	?	1943	Russian	Male
Vladimir Zhigalin	Владимир Жигалин	New	Promoted	1907	1990	1931	Russian	Male
Marina Zhuravleva	Марина Журавлёва	New	Not	1931	Alive	1953	Russian	Female
Grigory Zolutukhin	Григо́рий Золоту́хин	New	Not	1911	1988	1939	Russian	Male
Vasily Zotov	Васи́лий Зо́тов	New	Candidate	1899	1977	1925	Russian	Male
