= Central Committee of the 23rd Congress of the Communist Party of the Soviet Union =

The Central Committee of the 23rd Congress of the Communist Party of the Soviet Union was in session from 1966 until 1971. There were 195 regular members chosen, an increase from the 175 selected in 1961; of the 195 members, 51 were newcomers, and 144 were incumbents; another 31 had died or resigned since the 1961 election. Another 145 candidate members, who could participate but could not vote on motions, were picked in addition to the voting regular members.

The Committee elected, at its 1st Plenary Session, the 23rd Politburo, the 23rd Secretariat and the 23rd Party Control Committee of the Communist Party of the Soviet Union.

== Plenums ==
The Central Committee was not a permanent institution. It convened plenary sessions. 16 CC plenary sessions were held between the 23rd Congress and the 24th Congress. When the CC was not in session, decision-making power was vested in the internal bodies of the CC itself; that is, the Politburo and the Secretariat. None of these bodies were permanent either; typically they convened several times a month.

Plenary sessions of the Central Committee
Plenum	Date	Length
1st Plenary Session	8 April 1966	1 day
2nd Plenary Session	25–27 May 1966	3 days
3rd Plenary Session	1 August 1966	1 day
4th Plenary Session	12–13 December 1966	2 days
5th Plenary Session	20–21 June 1967	2 days
6th Plenary Session	26 September 1967	1 day
7th Plenary Session	9–10 April 1968	2 days
8th Plenary Session	17 July 1968	6 days
9th Plenary Session	30–31 October 1968	2 days
10th Plenary Session	9 December 1968	1 day
11th Plenary Session	26 June 1969	1 day
12th Plenary Session	15 December 1969	1 day
13th Plenary Session	2–3 July 1970	2 days
14th Plenary Session	13 July 1970	1 day
15th Plenary Session	7 December 1970	1 day
16th Plenary Session	22 March 1971	1 day

== Composition ==
=== Members ===
Members of the Central Committee of the 23rd Congress of the Communist Party of the Soviet Union
Name	Cyrillic	22nd CC	24th CC	Birth	Death	PM	Ethnicity	Gender
Pyotr Abrasimov	Петр Абрасимов	Old	Reelected	1912	2009	1940	Russian	Male
Sergey Afanseyev	Серге́й Афана́сьев	Old	Reelected	1918	2001	1943	Russian	Male
Vali Akhundov	Вели Ахундов	Old	Not	1916	1986	1939	Azerbaijani	Male
Anatoly Alexandrov	Анатолий Александров	New	Reelected	1903	1994	1962	Ukrainian	Male
Yuri Andropov	Юрий Андропов	Old	Reelected	1914	1984	1939	Russian	Male
Sergey Antonov	Сергей Антонов	New	Not	1914	2000	1948	Russian	Male
Averky Aristov	Аверкий Аристов	Old	Not	1903	1973	1921	Russian	Male
Asanbay Askarov	Асанбай Аскаров	New	Reelected	1922	2001	1944	Kazakh	Male
Ivan Bagramyan	Иван Баграмян	Old	Reelected	1897	1982	1941	Armenian	Male
Nikolai Baibakov	Николай Байбаков	Comeback	Reelected	1911	2008	1939	Russian	Male
Nikolai Bannikov	Никола́й Ба́нников	Promoted	Reelected	1914	2004	1937	Russian	Male
Alexander Basov	Александр Басов	Old	Reelected	1912	1988	1945	Russian	Male
Pavel Batitsky	Па́вел Бати́цкий	Candidate	Reelected	1910	1984	1938	Ukrainian	Male
Afanasy Beloborodov	Афанасий Белобородов	New	Not	1903	1990	1926	Russian	Male
Ivan Benediktov	Иван Бенедиктов	Old	Not	1902	1983	1930	Russian	Male
Boris Beshchev	Борис Бещев	Old	Reelected	1903	1981	1927	Russian	Male
Masymkhan Beysebayev	Масымхан Бейсебаев	Candidate	Not	1908	1987	1932	Kazakh	Male
Ivan Bodiul	Иван Бодюл	Old	Reelected	1918	2013	1940	Ukrainian	Male
Andrei Borodin	Андрей Бородин	New	Reelected	1912	1984	1941	Russian	Male
Pavel Borodin	Павел Бородин	New	Reelected	1911	1998	1932	Russian	Male
Leonid Brezhnev	Леонид Брежнев	Old	Reelected	1906	1982	1931	Russian	Male
Boris Butoma	Бутома Евстафьевич	Old	Reelected	1907	1976	1928	Ukrainian	Male
Vasily Chernyshev	Василий Чернышёв	Old	Died	1908	1969	1928	Russian	Male
Stepan Chervonenko	Степан Червоненко	Old	Reelected	1915	2003	1940	Ukrainian	Male
Vasily Chuikov	Васи́лий Чуйко́в	Old	Reelected	1900	1982	1919	Russian	Male
Viktor Churayev	Виктор Чураев	Old	Not	1903	1982	1929	Russian	Male
Abdurakhman Daniyalov	Абдурахман Даниялов	Old	Not	1908	1981	1928	Avar	Male
Vladimir Degtyarov	Владимир Дегтярёв	New	Reelected	1920	1993	1945	Russian	Male
Pyotr Dementev	Pyotr Dementev	Old	Reelected	1907	1977	1938	Russian	Male
Pyotr Demichev	Пётр Де́мичев	Old	Reelected	1917	2010	1939	Russian	Male
Veniamin Dymshits	Вениамин Дымшиц	Old	Reelected	1910	1993	1937	Ukrainian	Male
Pyotr Fedoseyev	Петр Федосеев	Old	Reelected	1908	1990	1939	Russian	Male
Leonid Florentyev	Леонид Флорентьев	Old	Reelected	1911	2003	1939	Russian	Male
Yekaterina Furtseva	Екатерина Фурцева	Old	Reelected	1910	1974	1930	Russian	Female
Valentina Gaganova	Валентина Гаганова	Old	Not	1932	2010	1949	Russian	Female
Konstantin Galanshin	Константин Галаншин	Old	Reelected	1912	2011	1944	Russian	Male
Vasily Garbuzov	Василий Гарбузов	Old	Reelected	1911	1985	1939	Russian	Male
Alexander Georgiev	Александр Георгиев	Old	Reelected	1913	1976	1943	Ukrainian	Male
Sergey Gorshkov	Серге́й Горшков	Old	Reelected	1910	1988	1942	Russian	Male
Fodor Goryachev	Фёдор Горячев	Old	Reelected	1905	1996	1927	Russian	Male
Andrei Grechko	Андре́й Гре́чко	Old	Reelected	1903	1976	1928	Ukrainian	Male
Konstantin Grishin	Константин Гришин	Old	Reelected	1908	1973	1931	Russian	Male
Viktor Grishin	Ви́ктор Гри́шин	Old	Reelected	1914	1992	1939	Russian	Male
Ivan Grishmanov	Иван Гришманов	Old	Reelected	1906	1979	1936	Russian	Male
Andrei Gromyko	Андрей Громыко	Old	Reelected	1909	1989	1931	Belarusian	Male
Pyotr Grushin	Пётр Гру́шин	New	Reelected	1906	1993	1931	Russian	Male
Ivan Hrushetsky	Иван Грушецкий	Old	Reelected	1904	1982	1928	Ukrainian	Male
Nikolai Ignatov	Никола́й Игна́тов	Old	Died	1901	1966	1924	Russian	Male
Givi Javakhishvili	Гиви Джавахишвили	Old	Reelected	1912	1985	1941	Georgian	Male
Johannes Käbin	Йоха́ннес Кэ́бин	Old	Reelected	1905	1999	1927	Estonian	Male
Valery Kalmykov	Валерий Калмыков	Old	Reelected	1908	1974	1942	Russian	Male
Jānis Kalnbērziņš	Ян Калнбе́рзинь	Old	Not	1893	1986	1917	Latvian	Male
Ivan Kapitonov	Иван Капитонов	Old	Reelected	1915	2002	1939	Russian	Male
Konstantin Katushev	Константин Катушев	New	Reelected	1927	2010	1952	Russian	Male
Vasily Kavun	Василий Кавун	Old	Reelected	1928	2009	1954	Ukrainian	Male
Ivan Kazanets	Иван Казанец	Old	Reelected	1918	2013	1944	Ukrainian	Male
Mstislav Keldysh	Мстислав Келдыш	Old	Reelected	1911	1978	1949	Russian	Male
Vladimir Kholyavko	Владимир Холявко	New	Not	1934	Alive	1957	Ukrainian	Male
Andrei Kirilenko	Андре́й Кириле́нко	Old	Reelected	1906	1990	1930	Ukrainian	Male
Vladimir Kirillin	Владимир Кириллин	Candidate	Reelected	1913	1999	1937	Russian	Male
Ivan Kiselov	Иван Киселёв	Old	Reelected	1917	2004	1944	Russian	Male
Tikhon Kiselyov	Ти́хон Киселёв	Old	Reelected	1917	1983	1940	Belarusian	Male
Vasily Klimenko	Василий Клименко	Old	Not	1906	1984	1929	Ukrainian	Male
Anton Kochinyan	Анто́н Кочиня́н	Candidate	Reelected	1913	1989	1931	Armenian	Male
Aleksandr Kokarev	Александр Кокарев	Old	Reelected	1909	1991	1938	Ukrainian	Male
Vasily Komyakhov	Василь Комяхов	Old	Died	1911	1966	1941	Russian	Male
Ivan Konev	Иван Конев	Old	Reelected	1897	1973	1918	Russian	Male
Vasily Konotop	Василий Конотоп	Candidate	Reelected	1916	1995	1944	Ukrainian	Male
Nikolay Konovalov	Никола́й Конова́лов	Old	Reelected	1907	1993	1929	Russian	Male
Oleksandr Korniychuk	Александр Корнейчук	Old	Reelected	1905	1972	1940	Ukrainian	Male
Demyan Korotchenko	Демьян Коротченко	Comeback	Died	1894	1969	1918	Ukrainian	Male
Nikolay Korytkov	Николай Корытков	Old	Reelected	1910	2000	1939	Russian	Male
Shapet Kospanov	Шапет Коспанов	New	Reelected	1914	2006	1944	Kazakh	Male
Anatoly Kostousov	Анатолий Костоусов	Old	Reelected	1906	1985	1925	Russian	Male
Alexei Kosygin	Алексей Косыгин	Old	Reelected	1904	1980	1927	Russian	Male
Alexander Kovalenko	Александр Коваленко	Old	Reelected	1909	1987	1931	Ukrainian	Male
Pavel Kovanov	Павел Кованов	Candidate	Not	1907	1986	1940	Russian	Male
Yevgeny Kozhevnikov	Евгений Кожевников	Old	Reelected	1905	1979	1942	Russian	Male
Vasily Kozlov	Василий Козлов	Candidate	Died	1903	1967	1927	Belarusian	Male
Mikhail Krakhmalov	Михаил Крахмалёв	Old	Reelected	1914	1977	1939	Russian	Male
Nikolay Krylov	Никола́й Крыло́в	Old	Reelected	1903	1972	1927	Russian	Male
Fyodor Kulakov	Фёдор Кулаков	Old	Reelected	1918	1978	1940	Russian	Male
Leonid Kulichenko	Леонид Куличенко	New	Reelected	1913	1990	1940	Russian	Male
Dinmukhamed Kunaev	Дінмұхаммед Қонаев	Old	Reelected	1912	1993	1939	Kazakh	Male
Rakhmankul Kurbanov	Рахманкул Курбанов	Old	Not	1912	2012	1940	Uzbek	Male
Vasily Kuznetsov	Василий Кузнецов	Old	Reelected	1901	1990	1927	Russian	Male
Mikhail Lesechko	Михаил Лесечко	Old	Reelected	1909	1984	1940	Ukrainian	Male
Oleksandr Liashko	Алекса́ндр Ляшко́	Old	Reelected	1915	2002	1942	Ukrainian	Male
Yevgeny Loginov	Евге́ний Ло́гинов	Promoted	Died	1907	1970	1939	Russian	Male
Pyotr Lomako	Пётр Лома́ко	Comeback	Reelected	1904	1990	1925	Russian	Male
Vladimir Lomonosov	Владимир Ломоносов	New	Reelected	1928	1999	1950	Russian	Male
Ivan Lutak	Иван Лутак	Old	Reelected	1919	2009	1940	Ukrainian	Male
Rodion Malinovsky	Родио́н Малино́вский	Old	Died	1898	1967	1926	Ukrainian	Male
Sergey Manyakin	Сергей Манякин	Old	Reelected	1923	2010	1945	Russian	Male
Pyotr Masherov	Пётр Машеров	Old	Reelected	1918	1980	1943	Belarusian	Male
Vladimir Matskevich	Владимир Мацкевич	Comeback	Reelected	1909	1998	1939	Ukrainian	Male
Kirill Mazurov	Кири́лл Ма́зуров	Old	Reelected	1914	1989	1940	Belarusian	Male
Nikolai Mikhailov	Николай Михайлов	Old	Not	1906	1982	1930	Russian	Male
Anastas Mikoyan	Анастас Микоян	Old	Reelected	1895	1978	1915	Armenian	Male
Leonid Monashev	Леонид Монашев	Old	Not	1914	1995	1939	Russian	Male
Kirill Moskalenko	Кирилл Москаленко	Old	Reelected	1902	1985	1926	Ukrainian	Male
Vasil Mzhavanadze	Василий Мжаванадзе	Old	Reelected	1902	1988	1927	Georgian	Male
Yadgar Nasriddinova	Ядгар Насриддинова	Old	Reelected	1920	2006	1942	Uzbek	Female
Konstantin Nikolayev	Константин Николаев	Candidate	Not	1910	1972	1940	Russian	Male
Tatyana Nikolayeva	Татьяна Николаева	Old	Not	1919	2022	1940	Russian	Female
Ignaty Novikov	Игнатий Новиков	Old	Reelected	1906	1993	1926	Ukrainian	Male
Vladimir Novikov	Владимир Новиков	Old	Reelected	1907	2000	1936	Russian	Male
Ziya Nuriyev	Зия Нуриев	Old	Reelected	1915	2012	1939	Bashkir	Male
Nikolay Organov	Николай Органов	Old	Not	1901	1982	1925	Russian	Male
Balysh Ovezov	Балыш Овезов	Old	Not	1915	1975	1939	Turkmen	Male
Nikolai Patolichev	Николай Патоличев	Old	Reelected	1908	1989	1928	Russian	Male
Borys Paton	Бори́с Пато́н	Candidate	Reelected	1918	2020	1952	Ukrainian	Male
Sergey Pavlov	Серге́й Па́влов	Old	Not	1929	1993	1954	Russian	Male
Vladimir Pavlov	Влади́мир Па́влов	New	Reelected	1923	1998	1948	Russian	Male
Nikolai Pegov	Георгий Павлов	Old	Reelected	1905	1991	1939	Ukrainian	Male
Jānis Peive	Ян Пейве	New	Not	1906	1976	1940	Latvian	Male
Arvīds Pelše	А́рвид Пе́льше	Old	Reelected	1899	1983	1915	Latvian	Male
Nikolai Podgorny	Никола́й Подго́рный	Old	Reelected	1903	1983	1930	Ukrainian	Male
Ivan Polyakov	Ива́н Поляко́в	Candidate	Reelected	1914	2004	1949	Belarusian	Male
Dmitry Polyansky	Дми́трий Поля́нский	Old	Reelected	1917	2001	1939	Ukrainian	Male
Boris Ponomarev	Борис Пономарёв	Old	Reelected	1905	1995	1919	Russian	Male
Georgy Popov	Георгий Попов	Old	Not	1912	1984	1942	Russian	Male
Nina Popova	Нина Попова	Old	Reelected	1908	1994	1932	Russian	Female
Pyotr Pospelov	Пётр Поспелов	Old	Not	1898	1979	1916	Russian	Male
Vladimir Promyslov	Владимир Промыслов	New	Reelected	1908	1993	1928	Russian	Male
Sergey Pritytsky	Серге́й Притыцкий	Old	Reelected	1913	1971	1932	Belarusian	Male
Alexander Puzanov	Александр Пузанов	Old	Reelected	1906	1998	1925	Russian	Male
Konstantin Pysin	Константин Пысин	Old	Not	1910	1987	1925	Russian	Male
Sharof Rashidov	Шараф Рашидов	Old	Reelected	1917	1983	1939	Uzbek	Male
Dzhabar Rasulov	Джабар Расулов	Old	Reelected	1913	1982	1934	Tajik	Male
Nikolai Rodionov	Никола́й Родио́нов	Candidate	Reelected	1915	1999	1944	Russian	Male
Grigory Romanov	Григорий Романов	New	Reelected	1923	2008	1944	Russian	Male
Alexander Rudakov	Алекса́ндр Рудако́в	Old	Died	1910	1966	1931	Russian	Male
Roman Rudenko	Рома́н Руде́нко	Old	Reelected	1907	1981	1926	Russian	Male
Konstantin Rudnev	Константин Руднев	Old	Reelected	1911	1980	1941	Russian	Male
Aleksey Rumyantsev	Алексей Румянцев	Old	Reelected	1905	1993	1940	Russian	Male
Vasily Ryabikov	Васи́лий Ря́биков	Old	Reelected	1907	1974	1925	Russian	Male
Vladimir Semichastny	Влади́мир Семича́стный	Old	Not	1924	2001	1944	Russian	Male
Nikolai Shchelokov	Никола́й Щёлоков	Promoted	Reelected	1910	1984	1931	Russian	Male
Volodymyr Shcherbytsky	Влади́мир Щерби́цкий	Old	Reelected	1918	1990	1948	Ukrainian	Male
Semon Shchetinin	Семён Щетинин	Old	Reelected	1910	1975	1932	Russian	Male
Alexander Shelepin	Алекса́ндр Шеле́пин	Old	Reelected	1918	1994	1940	Russian	Male
Petro Shelest	Петро Шелест	Old	Reelected	1908	1996	1928	Ukrainian	Male
Alexander Sheremetov	Александр Шереметов	Promoted	Reelected	1925	2006	1952	Russian	Male
Vladimir Shevchenko	Владимир Шевченко	New	Reelected	1918	1997	1940	Ukrainian	Male
Aleksey Shibayev	Алексей Шибаев	Old	Reelected	1915	1991	1940	Russian	Male
Aleksey Shitikov	Алексе́й Ши́тиков	Old	Reelected	1912	1993	1939	Russian	Male
Aleksey Shkolnikov	Алексей Шко́льников	Old	Reelected	1914	2003	1940	Russian	Male
Aleksandr Shokin	Алекса́ндр Шо́кин	Candidate	Reelected	1909	1988	1936	Russian	Male
Mikhail Sholokhov	Михаил Шолохов	Old	Reelected	1905	1984	1932	Russian	Male
Nikolai Shvernik	Никола́й Шве́рник	Old	Died	1888	1970	1905	Russian	Male
Mikhail Sinitsa	Михаил Синица	Old	Not	1913	1985	1942	Ukrainian	Male
Anatoly Skochilov	Анатолий Скочилов	Candidate	Reelected	1912	1977	1940	Russian	Male
Efim P. Slavsky	Ефи́м Сла́вский	Old	Reelected	1898	1991	1918	Russian	Male
Leonid Smirnov	Леонид Смирнов	Old	Reelected	1916	2001	1943	Russian	Male
Antanas Sniečkus	Антанас Снечкус	Old	Reelected	1903	1974	1920	Lithuanian	Male
Nikolay Sobol	Николай Со́боль	Old	Not	1910	1991	1939	Ukrainian	Male
Sergey Sokolov	Серге́й Соколо́в	Promoted	Reelected	1911	2012	1937	Russian	Male
Tikhon Sokovlev	Ти́хон Соколо́в	Old	Reelected	1913	1992	1941	Russian	Male
Mikhail Solomentsev	Михаи́л Соло́менцев	Old	Reelected	1913	2008	1940	Russian	Male
Ivan Spiridnov	Ива́н Спиридо́нов	Old	Not	1905	1991	1928	Russian	Male
Vladimir Stepakov	Влади́мир Степако́в	New	Reelected	1912	1987	1937	Russian	Male
Alexander Struyev	Алекса́ндр Стру́ев	Candidate	Reelected	1906	1991	1927	Ukrainian	Male
Fodor Surganov	Фёдор Сурганов	Old	Reelected	1911	1976	1940	Belarusian	Male
Mikhail Suslov	Михаил Суслов	Old	Reelected	1902	1982	1921	Russian	Male
Fikryat Tabeyev	Фикрят Табеев	Old	Reelected	1928	2015	1957	Russian	Male
Nikolai Tikhonov	Николай Тихонов	Candidate	Reelected	1905	1997	1940	Russian	Male
Fedor Titov	Фёдор Титов	Old	Not	1910	1989	1930	Tatar	Male
Vitaly Titov	Виталий Титов	Old	Reelected	1907	1980	1938	Ukrainian	Male
Alexander Tokarev	Алекса́ндр То́карев	New	Reelected	1921	2004	1942	Russian	Male
Vasily Tolstikov	Василий Толстиков	Old	Reelected	1917	2003	1948	Russian	Male
Sergey Trapeznikov	Сергей Трапезников	New	Reelected	1912	1984	1931	Russian	Male
Dmitriy Ustinov	Дми́трий Усти́нов	Old	Reelected	1908	1984	1927	Russian	Male
Turdakun Usubaliev	Турдакун Усубалиев	Old	Reelected	1919	2015	1945	Kyrghyz	Male
Nikolai Vasilyev	Павел Бородин	New	Reelected	1916	2011	1942	Russian	Male
Oleksiy Vatchenko	Алексе́й Ва́тченко	Candidate	Reelected	1914	1984	1940	Ukrainian	Male
Konstantin Vershinin	Константин Вершинин	Old	Not	1900	1973	1919	Russian	Male
Alexander Volkov	Александр Волков	Old	Reelected	1910	1990	1931	Russian	Male
Feodosy Voronov	Феодо́сий Во́ронов	Old	Not	1904	1975	1927	Russian	Male
Gennady Voronov	Геннадий Воронов	Old	Reelected	1910	1994	1931	Russian	Male
Kliment Voroshilov	Климент Ворошилов	Comeback	Died	1881	1969	1903	Russian	Male
Ivan Yakubovsky	Ива́н Якубо́вский	Old	Reelected	1912	1976	1937	Belarusian	Male
Mikhail Yasnov	Михаил Яснов	Old	Reelected	1906	1991	1925	Russian	Male
Leonid Yefremov	Леонид Ефремов	Old	Not	1912	2007	1941	Russian	Male
Mikhail Yefremov	Михаил Ефремов	Old	Reelected	1911	2000	1931	Russian	Male
Nikolay Yegorychev	Никола́й Его́рычев	Old	Not	1920	2005	1942	Russian	Male
Vyacheslav Yelyutin	Вячеслав Елю́тин	Old	Reelected	1907	1993	1929	Russian	Male
Alexei Yepishev	Алексей Епишев	Old	Reelected	1908	1985	1929	Russian	Male
Afanasy Yeshtokin	Афана́сий Ешто́кин	New	Reelected	1913	1974	1943	Russian	Male
Ivan Yunak	Иван Юнак	Old	Reelected	1918	1995	1944	Ukrainian	Male
Matvei Zakharov	Матве́й Заха́ров	Old	Reelected	1898	1972	1917	Russian	Male
Vladimir Zhigalin	Владимир Жигалин	Old	Reelected	1907	1990	1931	Russian	Male
Mikhail Zimyanin	Михаил Зимянин	Old	Reelected	1914	1995	1939	Belarusian	Male
Grigory Zolotukhin	Григо́рий Золоту́хин	Comeback	Reelected	1911	1988	1939	Russian	Male
Valerian Zorin	Валериан Зорин	Old	Not	1902	1986	1922	Russian	Male
Sergey Zverev	Серге́й Зве́рев	Old	Reelected	1912	1978	1932	Russian	Male

=== Candidates ===
Candidate Members of the Central Committee of the 23rd Congress of the Communist Party of the Soviet Union
Name	Cyrillic	22nd CC	24th CC	Birth	Death	PM	Ethnicity	Gender
Malik Abdurazakov	Малик Абдуразаков	Candidate	Not	1919	1973	1940	Uzbek	Male
Pavel Afanasyev	Афана́сьев Я́ковлевич	Candidate	Not	1905	1989	1925	Russian	Male
Evgeny Alekseevsky	Евгений Алексеевский	New	Member	1906	1979	1925	Ukrainian	Male
Enver Alikhanov	Энвер Алиханов	New	Not	1917	1992	1943	Azerbaijani	Male
Nikolai Amelko	Николай Амелько	New	Not	1914	2007	1944	Belarusian	Male
Dmitry Angelyev	Дмитрий Ангельев	New	Not	1918	1985	1947	Ukrainian	Male
Aleksey Antonov	Алексей Антонов	Candidate	Member	1912	2010	1940	Russian	Male
Vasily Antonov	Василий Антонов	Candidate	Died	1914	1967	1937	Russian	Male
Stepan Avramenko	Степан Авраменко	New	Member	1918	2010	1950	Ukrainian	Male
Viktor Bakayev	Виктор Бакаев	Candidate	Not	1902	1987	1919	Russian	Male
Nikolai Bannikov	Никола́й Ба́нников	New	Promoted	1914	2004	1937	Russian	Male
Vladimir Bazovsky	Владимир Базовский	Candidate	Candidate	1917	1993	1942	Russian	Male
Raisa Belskikh	Раиса Бельских	New	Not	1934	2012	1960	Russian	Female
Aleksandr Bochkarov	Александр Бочкарёв	New	Not	1908	1985	1931	Russian	Male
Boris Bratchenko	Бори́с Бра́тченко	New	Member	1912	2004	1940	Russian	Male
Konstantin Brekhov	Константи́н Бре́хов	Candidate	Member	1907	1994	1931	Russian	Male
Nikita Bubnovsky	Никита Бубновский	Candidate	Not	1907	1997	1939	Ukrainian	Male
Semyon Budyonny	Семён Будённый	Candidate	Candidate	1883	1973	1919	Russian	Male
Aleksandr Bulgakov	Александр Булгаков	Candidate	Member	1907	1996	1937	Ukrainian	Male
Boris Butoma	Бутома Евстафьевич	Candidate	Member	1907	1976	1928	Ukrainian	Male
Konstantin Chernenko	Константин Черненко	New	Member	1911	1985	1931	Ukrainian	Male
Gavrii Chiryayev	Гавриил Чиряев	New	Member	1925	1985	1944	Yakut	Male
Anatoly Chubarov	Анатолий Чубаров	New	Not	1922	2006	1943	Russian	Male
Vladimir Demchenko	Иван Густов	New	Candidate	1920	1991	1946	Russian	Male
Raisa Dementyeva	Раиса Дементьева	New	Not	1925	Alive	1948	Russian	Female
Georgy Denisov	Георгий Денисов	Candidate	Not	1910	2005	1930	Russian	Male
Alexandru Diordiță	Александр Диордица	Candidate	Not	1911	1996	1938	Moldovan	Male
Viktor Dobrik	Виктор До́брик	New	Member	1927	2008	1954	Ukrainian	Male
Anatoly Dobrynin	Анато́лий Добры́нин	New	Member	1919	2010	1945	Russian	Male
Vasiliy Doyenin	Василий Доенин	New	Candidate	1909	1977	1940	Russian	Male
Vasily Drozdenko	Васи́лий Дрозде́нко	New	Member	1924	1982	1944	Ukrainian	Male
Anatoly Drygin	Анатолий Дрыгин	Candidate	Member	1914	1990	1940	Russian	Male
Georgy Frantsov	Юрий Францев	Candidate	Died	1903	1969	1940	Russian	Male
Viktor Fedorov	Ви́ктор Фёдоров	Candidate	Candidate	1912	1990	1939	Russian	Male
Vasily Frolov	Василий Фролов	Candidate	Candidate	1914	1994	1944	Russian	Male
Muhammetnazar Gapurov	Мухамедназар Гапуров	New	Member	1912	2004	1944	Turkmen	Male
Mikhail Georgadze	Михаил Георгадзе	New	Candidate	1912	1982	1942	Georgian	Male
Konstantin Gerasimov	Константин Гера́симов	Candidate	Candidate	1910	1982	1939	Russian	Male
Andrei Getman	Андрей Гетман	Candidate	Candidate	1903	1987	1927	Ukrainian	Male
Fedor Golovchenko	Федор Головченко	New	Not	1918	2001	1949	Ukrainian	Male
Basan Gorodovikov	Баса́н Городовико́в	New	Candidate	1910	1983	1939	Buzavan	Male
Dmitry Goryunov	Дми́трий Горюно́в	New	Not	1915	1992	1940	Russian	Male
Nikolai Gribachev	Николай Грибачёв	New	Candidate	1910	1992	1943	Russian	Male
Konstantin Grushevoy	Константин Грушевой	New	Candidate	1906	1982	1927	Ukrainian	Male
Ivan Gustov	Иван Густов	Candidate	Candidate	1911	1996	1932	Russian	Male
Vasily Isayev	Василий Исаев	New	Candidate	1917	2008	1939	Russian	Male
Aleksandr Ishkov	Александр Ишков	Candidate	Candidate	1905	1988	1927	Russian	Male
Semon Islyukov	Семён Ислюков	Candidate	Not	1915	1998	1939	Russian	Male
Bilar Kabaloyev	Семён Ислюков	Candidate	Candidate	1915	1998	1939	Chuvash	Male
Abdulakhad Kakharov	Абдулахад Кахаров	Candidate	Candidate	1913	1984	1939	Tajik	Male
Nikifor Kalchenko	Никифор Ка́льченко	Candidate	Candidate	1906	1989	1932	Ukrainian	Male
Andrey Kandrenkov	Андре́й Кандрёнков	Candidate	Candidate	1915	1989	1939	Russian	Male
Vladimir Karlov	Влади́мир Ка́рлов	Candidate	Candidate	1914	1994	1940	Russian	Male
Yevdokya Karpova	Марина Журавлёва	New	Candidate	1923	2000	1952	Russian	Female
Mikhail Kazakov	Михаил Казаков	Candidate	Not	1901	1979	1919	Russian	Male
Valter Klauson	Вальтер Клаусон	Candidate	Candidate	1913	1988	1943	Estonian	Male
Mikhail Klepikov	Михаил Клепиков	New	Member	1927	1999	1956	Russian	Male
Aleksandr Klimov	Александр Климов	Candidate	Candidate	1914	1979	1939	Russian	Male
Filipp Knyazev	Фили́пп Кня́зев	New	Candidate	1916	1994	1940	Russian	Male
Vyacheslav Kochemasov	Вячеслав Кочемасов	New	Candidate	1918	1998	1944	Russian	Male
Nikolay Kochetkov	Николай Кочетков	New	Candidate	1927	2002	1957	Russian	Male
Olga Kolchina	Ольга Колчина	Candidate	Candidate	1918	2017	1946	Russian	Female
Leonid Korniyets	Леони́д Рома́нович Корни́ец	Candidate	Died	1901	1969	1926	Ukrainian	Male
Aleksey Kortunov	Алексе́й Кортуно́в	Candidate	Candidate	1907	1973	1939	Russian	Male
Pyotr Koshevoy	Пётр Кошевой	Candidate	Not	1904	1976	1925	Ukrainian	Male
Leonid Kostandov	Леони́д Коста́ндов	New	Member	1915	1984	1942	Armenian	Male
Ivan Koval	Иван Коваль	Candidate	Not	1910	1996	1938	Ukrainian	Male
Grigory Kozlov	Григо́рий Козло́в	New	Died	1912	1968	1943	Russian	Male
Nikolay Kozlov	Николай Козлов	New	Member	1925	2001	1946	Russian	Male
Pavel Kozyr	Па́вел Ко́зырь	Candidate	Member	1913	1999	1939	Ukrainian	Male
Anatoly Kremen	Анатолий Кремень	New	Not	1929	Alive	1961	Belarusian	Male
Gleb Kriulin	Глеб Криулин	New	Candidate	1923	1988	1945	Belarusian	Male
Vasily Kutsevol	Васи́лий Куцево́л	New	Member	1920	2001	1947	Ukrainian	Male
Mikhail Lavrentyev	Михаи́л Лавре́нтьев	Candidate	Candidate	1900	1980	1952	Russian	Male
Ivan Lavronov	Иван Лаврёнов	New	Died	1912	1966	1932	Belarusian	Male
Pavel Leonov	Павел Леонов	Candidate	Member	1918	1992	1944	Russian	Male
Yegor Ligachyov	Егор Лигачёв	New	Candidate	1920	2021	1944	Russian	Male
Semyon Lobov	Семён Лобов	New	Candidate	1913	1977	1940	Russian	Male
Yevgeny Loginov	Евге́ний Ло́гинов	New	Promoted	1907	1970	1939	Russian	Male
Fodor Loshchenkov	Фодор Лощенков	Candidate	Candidate	1915	2009	1943	Russian	Male
Nikolay Lyashchenko	Николай Лященко	New	Member	1910	2000	1931	Russian	Male
Lidia Lykova	Лидия Лыкова	Candidate	Candidate	1913	2016	1938	Russian	Female
Timbora Malbakhov	Тимбо́ра Мальба́хов	Candidate	Candidate	1917	1999	1942	Kabardian	Male
Pavel Malofeyev	Павел Малофеев	New	Not	1910	1983	1932	Russian	Male
Valery Marisov	Вале́рий Ма́рисов	Candidate	Member	1915	1992	1940	Russian	Male
Sergey Maryakhin	Сергей Маряхин	New	Member	1911	1972	1931	Russian	Male
Dmitry Mikhaylov	Дмитрий Михайлов	New	Not	1919	2018	1957	Russian	Male
Andrey Modogoyev	Андрей Модогоев	New	Member	1915	1989	1940	Buryat	Male
Badal Muradyan	Бадал Мурадян	New	Candidate	1915	1991	1951	Armenian	Male
Mirzamakhmud Musakhanov	Мирзамахмуд Мусаханов	Candidate	Candidate	1912	1995	1943	Uzbek	Male
Aleksandr Muzhitsky	Андрей Модогоев	New	Candidate	1912	1982	1932	Ukrainian	Male
Pyotr Neporozhny	Пётр Непорожний	New	Member	1910	1999	1940	Ukrainian	Male
Sabir Niyazbekov	Сабир Ниязбеков	New	Member	1912	1989	1939	Kazakh	Male
Konstantin Novikov	Константин Новиков	Candidate	Not	1910	1974	1932	Russian	Male
Nikolai Orgakov	Николай Огарков	New	Member	1917	1994	1945	Russian	Male
Georgy Osipov	Георгий Осипов	Candidate	Not	1906	1980	1927	Russian	Male
Justas Paleckis	Ю́стас Пале́цкис	Candidate	Not	1899	1980	1940	Lithuanian	Male
Boris Pastukhov	Борис Пастухов	New	Candidate	1933	2021	1959	Russian	Male
Georgy Pavlov	Гео́ргий Па́влов	Candidate	Member	1910	1991	1939	Russian	Male
Grigory Pavlov	Григорий Павлов	New	Candidate	1913	1994	1940	Russian	Male
Valentin Penkovsky	Валенти́н Пенько́вский	Candidate	Died	1904	1969	1926	Belarusian	Male
Boris Petrovsky	Борис Петровский	New	Candidate	1908	2004	1942	Russian	Male
Boris Petukhov	Борис Петухов	Candidate	Not	1913	1979	1940	Russian	Male
Pyotr Pimenov	Пётр Пименов	New	Candidate	1915	1980	1943	Russian	Male
Maria Poberey	Раиса Бельских	New	Candidate	1924	1981	1957	Russian	Female
Viktor Podzerko	Виктор Подзерко	New	Not	1912	?	1940	Ukrainian	Male
Mikhail Ponomarev	Михаил Пономарёв	Candidate	Candidate	1918	2001	1939	Russian	Male
Maria Popova	Мари́я Попо́ва	New	Candidate	1928	2021	1959	Russian	Female
Sergey Postovalov	Сергей Постовалов	Candidate	Not	1907	1983	1930	Russian	Male
Nikolay Psurtsev	Николай Псурцев	Candidate	Candidate	1900	1980	1919	Russian	Male
Pyotr Rodionov	Пётр Родионов	New	Not	1916	2013	1939	Russian	Male
Konstantin Rokossovsky	Константин Рокоссовский	Candidate	Died	1896	1968	1917	Polish	Male
Aleksey Romanov	Алексе́й Рома́нов	Candidate	Candidate	1908	1998	1939	Russian	Male
Nikolai Romanov	Николай Романов	New	Not	1913	1993	1937	Russian	Male
Pyotr Rozenko	Пётр Розенко	Candidate	Candidate	1907	1991	1943	Ukrainian	Male
Vitālijs Rubenis	Николай Романов	New	Candidate	1914	1994	1939	Latvian	Male
Vasily Rykov	Василий Рыков	New	Candidate	1918	2011	1943	Russian	Male
Vladimir Semyonov	Владимир Семёнов	New	Candidate	1911	1992	1938	Russian	Male
Ivan Senkin	Иван Сенькин	New	Member	1915	1986	1940	Karelian	Male
Ivan Serbin	Иван Сербин	Candidate	Candidate	1910	1981	1931	Russian	Male
Vasily Shauro	Василий Шауро	New	Candidate	1912	2007	1940	Belarusian	Male
Nikolai Shchelokov	Николай Щёлоков	New	Promoted	1910	1984	1931	Ukrainian	Male
Boris Shcherbina	Борис Щербина	Candidate	Candidate	1919	1990	1939	Ukrainian	Male
Aleksandr Sheremetov	Александр Шереметов	New	Promoted	1925	2006	1952	Russian	Male
Aleksandra Shevchenko	Александра Шевченко	Candidate	Candidate	1926	2000	1954	Ukrainian	Female
Aleksandr Sidorenko	Александр Сидоренко	New	Candidate	1917	1982	1942	Ukrainian	Male
Ivan Sinitsyn	Иван Синицын	New	Candidate	1917	1988	1940	Russian	Male
Pavel Sizov	Павел Сизов	New	Not	1916	1988	1941	Russian	Male
Semon Skachkov	Семён Скачков	Candidate	Member	1907	1996	1936	Ukrainian	Male
Igor Skulkov	Игорь Скулков	Candidate	Candidate	1913	1971	1932	Russian	Male
Ivan Slazhnov	Иван Слажнев	Candidate	Candidate	1913	1978	1939	Ukrainian	Male
Aleksandr I. Smirnov	Александр И. Смирнов	Candidate	Candidate	1912	1997	1937	Russian	Male
Aleksandr N. Smirnov	Александр Н. Смирнов	New	Candidate	1909	1972	1930	Russian	Male
Vasily Smirnov	Василий Смирно́в	Candidate	Member	1905	1979	1925	Russian	Male
Sergey Sokolov	Серге́й Соколо́в	New	Promoted	1911	2012	1937	Russian	Male
Vasily Sokolovsky	Васи́лий Соколо́вский	Candidate	Died	1897	1968	1931	Russian	Male
Andrey Stuchenko	Андре́й Стуче́нко	Candidate	Not	1904	1972	1929	Ukrainian	Male
Motiejus Šumauskas	Мотеюс Шумаускас	Candidate	Candidate	1905	1982	1924	Lithuanian	Male
Alexander Tarasov	Алекса́ндр Тара́сов	Candidate	Candidate	1911	1975	1940	Russian	Male
Vadim Tikunov	Вади́м Тикуно́в	Candidate	Not	1921	1980	1942	Russian	Male
Semyon Timoshenko	Семён Тимоше́нко	Candidate	Died	1895	1970	1919	Ukrainian	Male
Aleksey Titarenko	Алексе́й Титаре́нко	New	Member	1915	1992	1940	Ukrainian	Male
Salchak Toka	Салчак Тока	Candidate	Member	1901	1973	1944	Tuvan	Male
Lev Tolkunov	Лев Толкунов	New	Member	1919	1989	1943	Russian	Male
Pyotr Urayev	Пётр Ура́ев	New	Died	1910	1967	1939	Russian	Male
Artur Vader	Бутома Евстафьевич	Candidate	Member	1920	1978	1943	Estonian	Male
Ivan Vladychenko	Ива́н Влады́ченко	New	Candidate	1924	2022	1943	Ukrainian	Male
Praskovya Vorinina	Праско́вья Воро́нина	New	Not	1934	2003	1942	Russian	Female
Mikhail Vsevolozhsky	Михаи́л Все́воложский	New	Candidate	1917	2000	1944	Russian	Male
Fuad Yakubovsky	Ива́н Якубо́вский	New	Candidate	1908	1975	1944	Tatar	Male
Mikhail Yangel	Михаил Янгель	New	Candidate	1911	1971	1931	Ukrainian	Male
Anatoly Yegorov	Анато́лий Его́ров	New	Candidate	1924	1982	1944	Russian	Male
Lev Yermin	Ле́в Е́рмин	Candidate	Member	1923	2004	1943	Russian	Male
Andrey Yeryomenko	Андре́й Ерёменко	Candidate	Died	1892	1970	1918	Ukrainian	Male
Aleksandr Yezhevsky	Александр Ежевский	New	Member	1915	2017	1945	Russian	Male
Mikhail Zakharov	Михаил Захаров	New	Candidate	1918	?	1943	Russian	Male
Konstantin Zarodov	Николай Журин	New	Candidate	1920	1982	1940	Russian	Male
Marina Zhuravlova	Марина Журавлёва	New	Not	1931	Alive	1953	Russian	Female
Nikolay Zhurin	Николай Журин	Comeback	Candidate	1908	1996	1930	Russian	Male
Vasily Zotov	Васи́лий Зо́тов	Candidate	Not	1899	1977	1925	Russian	Male
