= Dmitry Ustinov =

Soviet politician (1908–1984)

- Дмитрий Устинов
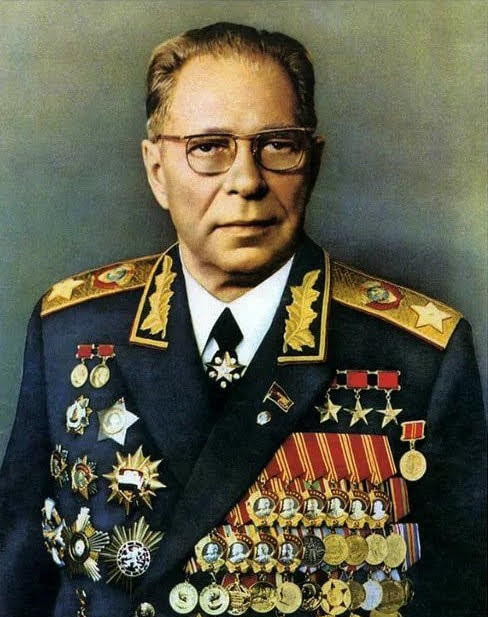
- Ustinov in 1978

Minister of Defence of the Soviet Union
- In office 26 April 1976 – 20 December 1984
- Premier: Alexei Kosygin; Nikolai Tikhonov
- Preceded by: Andrei Grechko
- Succeeded by: Sergei Sokolov

First Deputy Chairman of the Council of Ministers of the Soviet Union
- In office 13 March 1963 – 26 March 1965
- Premier: Nikita Khrushchev; Alexei Kosygin
- Preceded by: Alexei Kosygin
- Succeeded by: Kirill Mazurov

Minister of the Defense Industry of the Soviet Union
- In office 6 March 1953 – 14 December 1957
- Premier: Georgy Malenkov; Nikolai Bulganin
- Preceded by: Position established
- Succeeded by: Sergei Sverov

Personal details
- Born: 30 October 1908 Samara, Russian Empire
- Died: 20 December 1984 (aged 76) Moscow, Soviet Union
- Resting place: Kremlin Wall Necropolis
- Party: CPSU (1927–1984)
- Profession: Mechanical engineer
- Awards: Hero of the Soviet Union; Hero of Socialist Labour

Military service
- Allegiance: Soviet Union
- Branch/service: Soviet Armed Forces
- Years of service: 1941–1984
- Rank: Marshal of the Soviet Union (1976–1984)
- Battles/wars: World War II; Soviet–Afghan War
- Central institution membership: 1976–1984: Full member, 25th, 26th Politburo of the Communist Party of the Soviet Union; 1966—1976: Candidate Member, 22nd, 23rd, 24th Politburo; 1965—1976: Member, 22nd, 23rd, 24th, & 25th Secretariat of the Communist Party of the Soviet Union; 1952–1984: Full member, 19th, 20th, 22nd, 23rd, 24th, 25th, & 26th Central Committee of the Communist Party of the Soviet Union; Other offices held: 1967–76: Central Committee Secretary of Administrative Organs; 1965–76: Central Committee Secretary of the Defense Industry; 1957—63: Deputy Premier of the Soviet Union; 1957–63: Chairman of the Military-Industrial Commission; 1941–53: People's Commissar of Armaments; 1938–41: Director of the Leningrad Bolshevik Arms Factory

Dmitry Fyodorovich Ustinov (Russian: Дмитрий Фёдорович Устинов; 30 October 1908 – 20 December 1984) was a Soviet politician and a Marshal of the Soviet Union during the Cold War. He served as a Central Committee secretary in charge of the Soviet military–industrial complex from 1965 to 1976 and as Minister of Defence of the Soviet Union from 1976 until his death in 1984.

Ustinov was born in the city of Samara to a Russian working-class family in 1908. Upon reaching adulthood, he joined the Communist Party in 1927 before pursuing a career in engineering. After graduating from the Institute of Military Mechanical Engineering in 1934, he became a construction engineer at the Leningrad Artillery Marine Research Institute. By 1937, he transferred to the "Bolshevik" Arms Factory where he ultimately rose to become the director. While serving as People's Commissar of Armaments during World War II, he achieved distinction within the party's ranks by successfully overseeing the evacuation of Leningrad's industries to the Ural Mountains, a feat for which he was awarded the title of Hero of Socialist Labour. At the war's end, he was entrusted with seizing raw materials, scientists and research left over from Germany's missile programme.

Under Leonid Brezhnev's leadership, Ustinov joined the Central Committee Secretariat and rose to become a candidate member of the Politburo by 1965. Following his rise to the central party apparatus, he was given the task of administering the Soviet Union's defense industry and its armed forces. By 1976, he succeeded Andrei Grechko as Minister of Defense, received the rank of Marshal of the Soviet Union, and had joined the Politburo as a full member.

Throughout his tenure as Defense Minister, Marshal Ustinov's hardline attitudes towards the West and unreserved backing for his country's arms buildup underlay the national security strategy of the Soviet Union. As Brezhnev's health deteriorated from the mid-1970s onward, he increasingly dictated Soviet policy alongside Foreign Minister Andrei Gromyko and KGB Chairman Yuri Andropov until Brezhnev's death in 1982. Upon Konstantin Chernenko's accession to the office of General Secretary in February 1984, Ustinov formed an unofficial triumvirate alongside Gromyko and Chernenko that led the Soviet Union until his death on 20 December 1984.

== Early life ==
Dmitry Feodorovich Ustinov was born in a working-class family in Samara. During the Civil War, when hunger became intolerable, his sick father went to Samarkand, leaving Dmitry as head of the family. Shortly after that, in 1922, his father died. In 1923, he and his mother, Yevrosinya Martinovna, moved to the city of Makarev (near Ivanovo-Voznesensk) where he worked as a fitter in a paper mill. Shortly after that, in 1925, his mother died.

Ustinov joined the Communist Party in 1927. In 1929, he started training at the Faculty of Mechanics in the Ivanovo-Voznesensk Polytechnic Institute. Afterward, Ustinov was transferred to the Moscow Bauman Higher Technical School. Then, in March 1932, he entered the Institute of Military Mechanical Engineering in Leningrad from where he graduated in 1934. Afterward, he worked as a construction engineer at the Leningrad artillery Marine Research Institute. In 1937, he was transferred to the "Bolshevik" Arms Factory as an engineer. He later became the director of the Factory.

== War service ==
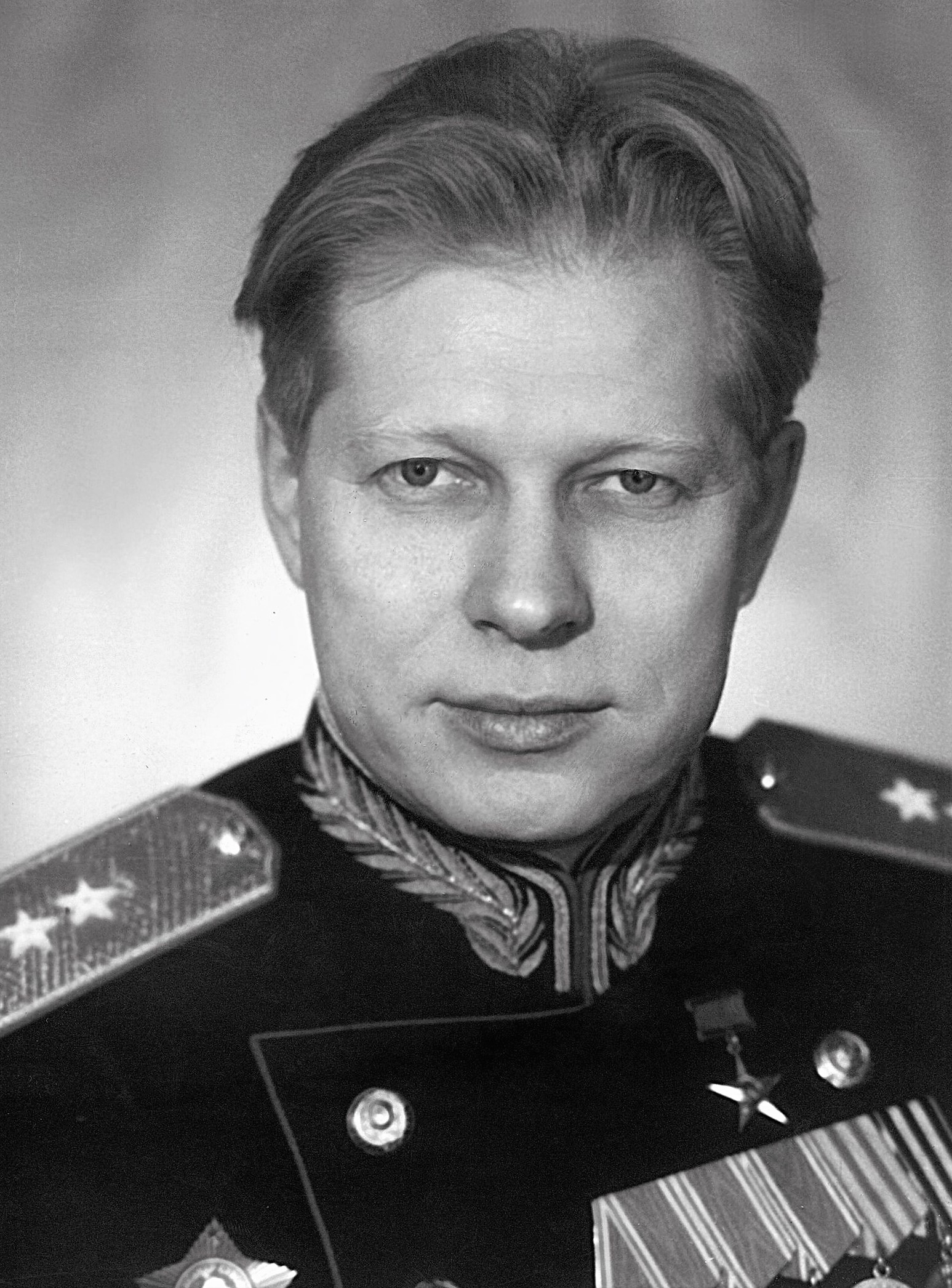
Ustinov in 1946

At the time of the German invasion of the Soviet Union, in June 1941, Joseph Stalin appointed the 32-year-old Ustinov to the post of People's Commissar of Armaments. From this position, he supervised the massive evacuation of the defence industry from the besieged city of Leningrad to east of the Ural Mountains. Over 80 military industries were evacuated that together employed over six hundred thousand workers, technicians, and engineers. Stalin later rewarded Ustinov, whom he called "the Red-head", with the Soviet Union's highest civilian honour, Hero of Socialist Labour. After the war was over, Ustinov played a crucial role in requisitioning the German missile programme, developed during World War II, as an impetus to the Soviet missile and space programmes.

== Post-war career ==
In 1952, Ustinov became a member of the Central Committee. In March 1953, after Stalin died, the Ministry of Armaments was combined with the Ministry of Aviation Industry to become the Ministry of Defense Industry, with Ustinov assigned as head of this new ministry. In 1957, he was appointed a Deputy Premier of the Soviet Union and became chairman of the Military-Industrial Commission.

=== Rise to the Soviet leadership ===
Leonid Brezhnev took power after the ousting of Khrushchev, and Ustinov returned to the defence industry. In 1965, Brezhnev made Ustinov a candidate member of the Politburo and secretary of the Central Committee with oversight of the military, the defense industry, and certain security organs. He was also placed in charge of developing the Soviet Union's strategic bomber force and intercontinental ballistic missile system. Ustinov was known in the defense industry as Uncle Mitya. He was also missile engineer Vladimir Chelomey's stolid personal adversary. He issued a directive, in February 1970, that ordered Chelomey's OKB-52 design bureau to combine its Almaz space station with Sergei Korolyov's OKB-1 design bureau, then headed by Vasili Mishin. This order was designed as an impetus towards the development of the Salyut space station.

Ustinov gained power in the bureaucracy as he rose in the defence industry.

=== Minister of Defence ===
In 1976, after Andrei Grechko died on 26 April, Ustinov became the Defence Minister and was promoted to General of the Army on 29 April. On 30 July, he was promoted to the highest military rank in the Soviet Union, Marshal of the Soviet Union, although he had no prior military career. Together, with Marshal Nikolai Ogarkov and the Soviet General Staff, Ustinov embarked on a programme to enhance and modernise the Soviet Union's development of military sciences. In 1979, he confidently asserted that "The armed forces of the USSR are on a high level that ensures the accomplishment of any tasks set by the party and the people".

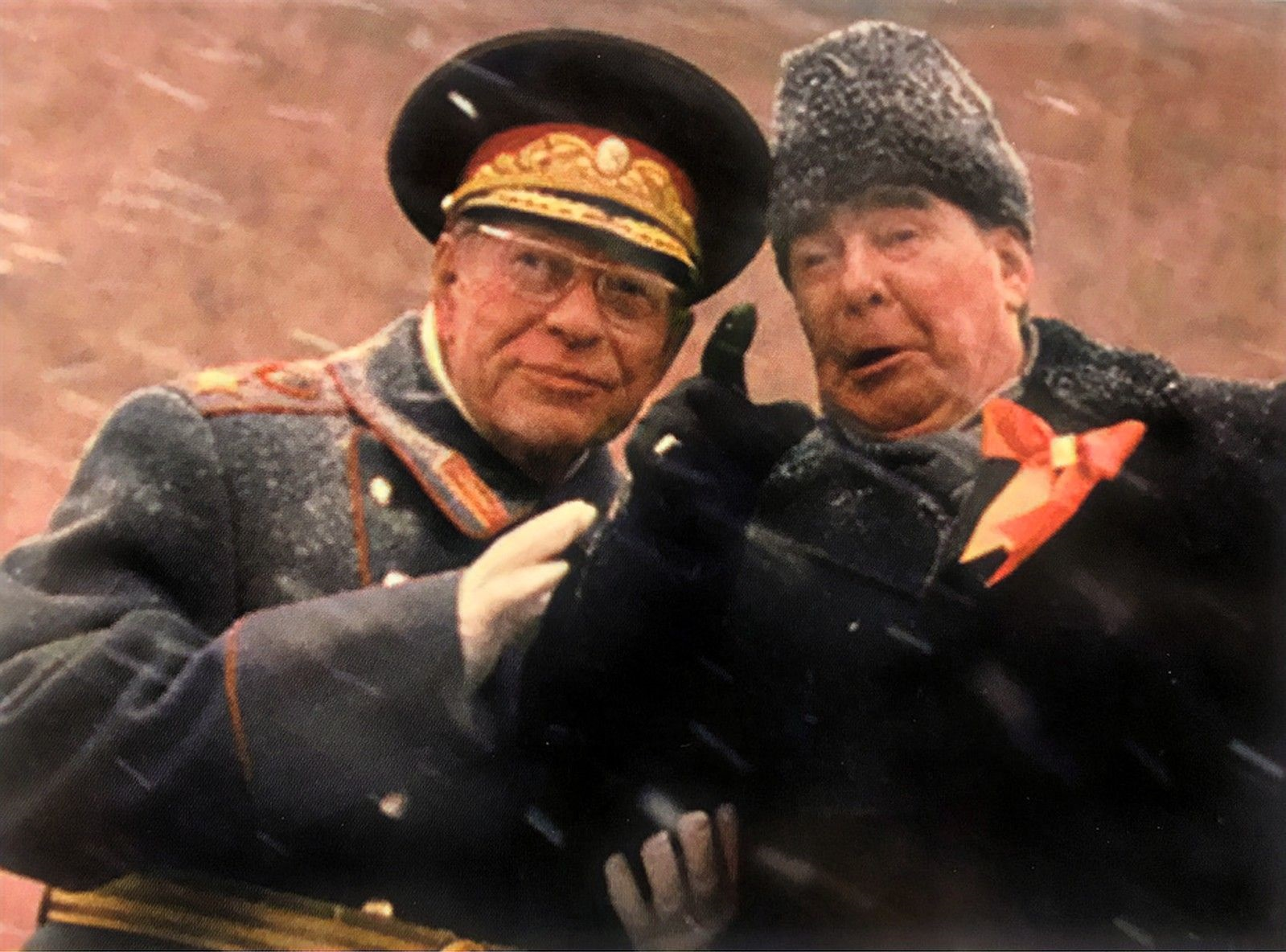
Brezhnev and Ustinov at the 1979 October Revolution Day Parade on Red Square celebrating the 62nd anniversary of the revolution.

The growing influence of the Soviet military gave Ustinov the role of Kremlin kingmaker, for his support was decisive in allowing Yuri Andropov to succeed Brezhnev. Ustinov was also influential in the Chernenko regime, compensating for the latter's serious health problems and inexperience in military affairs.

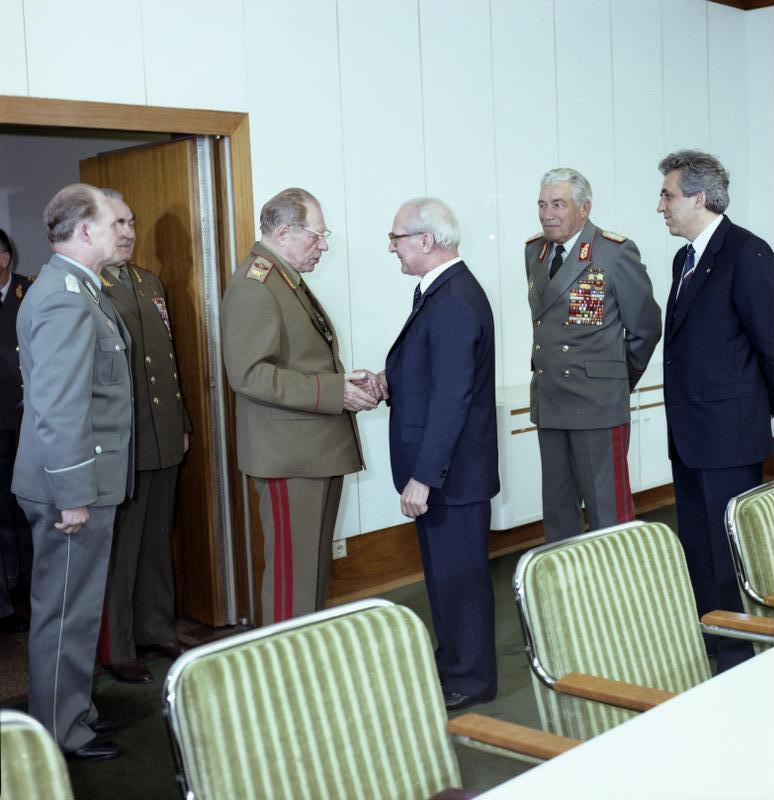
In 1984 in East Berlin, with Erich Honecker.

In 1979, Hafizullah Amin assassinated the leader of Afghanistan, Nur Muhammad Taraki. In October 1979, the sentiment for Soviet military intervention in Afghanistan grew stronger in the Soviet politburo where Ustinov and Andropov were the strongest proponents of military intervention. Soviet Foreign Minister Andrei Gromyko also lent his support for an invasion. The introduction of US forces into the Persian Gulf after the 1979 Iran hostage crisis particularly alarmed the Soviet General Staff. Ustinov began to wonder, "If the Americans do all these preparations under our noses, then why should we hunker down, play cautious, and lose Afghanistan?" In November, Ustinov and Andropov began to formulate plans for a Soviet military invasion of Afghanistan. On 12 December 1979, the Politburo approved the Ustinov-Andropov plan to invade Afghanistan. On 24 December 1979, Soviet troops entered Afghanistan.

In the early 1980s, the development of the Space Shuttle program in the United States caused considerable concern in the Soviet defense industry. While Defence Minister, Ustinov received a report from his analysts that the US Shuttle could be used to deploy space based nuclear missiles over Soviet territory. Russian space programme academic Boris Chertok recounts that Ustinov was so worried about the US Shuttle that he gave the development of the Soviet response program, the Buran Shuttle, top priority.

=== Involvement in the KAL 007 Disaster ===
In 1992, Russian president Boris Yeltsin disclosed five top-secret memos dating from late 1983, memos that had been written within weeks of the downing of Korean Air Lines Flight 007. These memos were published in Izvestia number 228 on 16 October 1992. According to these memos, the Soviet Union had been able to recover the "Black Box" from KAL 007 and decipher its tapes. Thereafter, Ustinov, along with Viktor Chebrikov, head of the KGB, recommended to General Secretary Yuri Andropov that their possession of the Black Box not be made public since its tapes could not support the Soviet contention that KAL 007 was on a U.S. espionage mission.

"In connection with all mentioned above it seems highly preferable not to transfer the flight recorders to the International Civil Aviation Organization (ICAO) or any third party willing to decipher their contents. The fact that the recorders are in possession of the USSR shall be kept secret. As far as we are aware neither the US nor Japan has any information on the flight recorders. We have made necessary efforts in order to prevent any disclosure of the information in future." (Memo 5.)

== Death and legacy ==
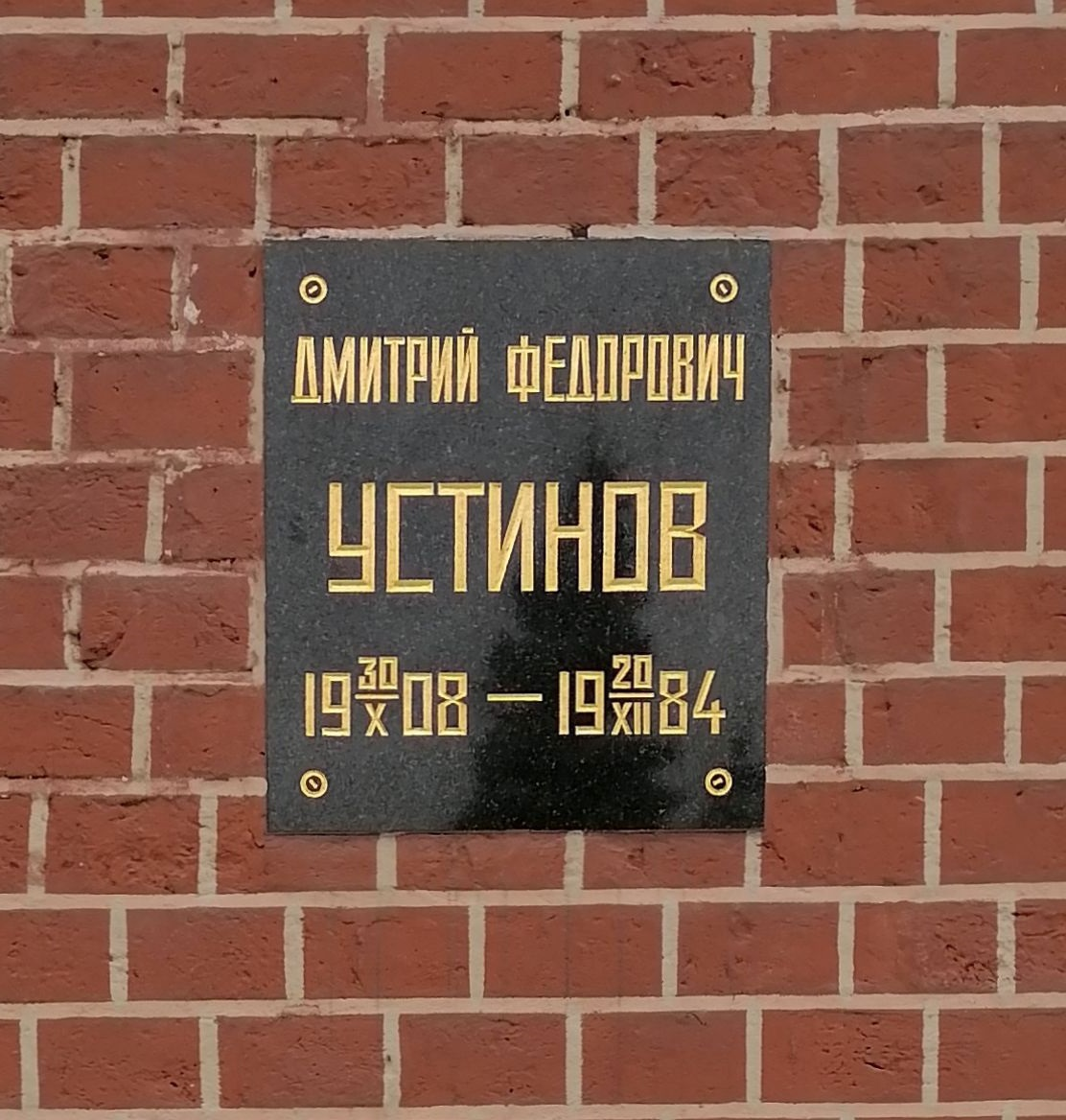
Grave of Ustinov at the Kremlin Wall Necropolis, Moscow

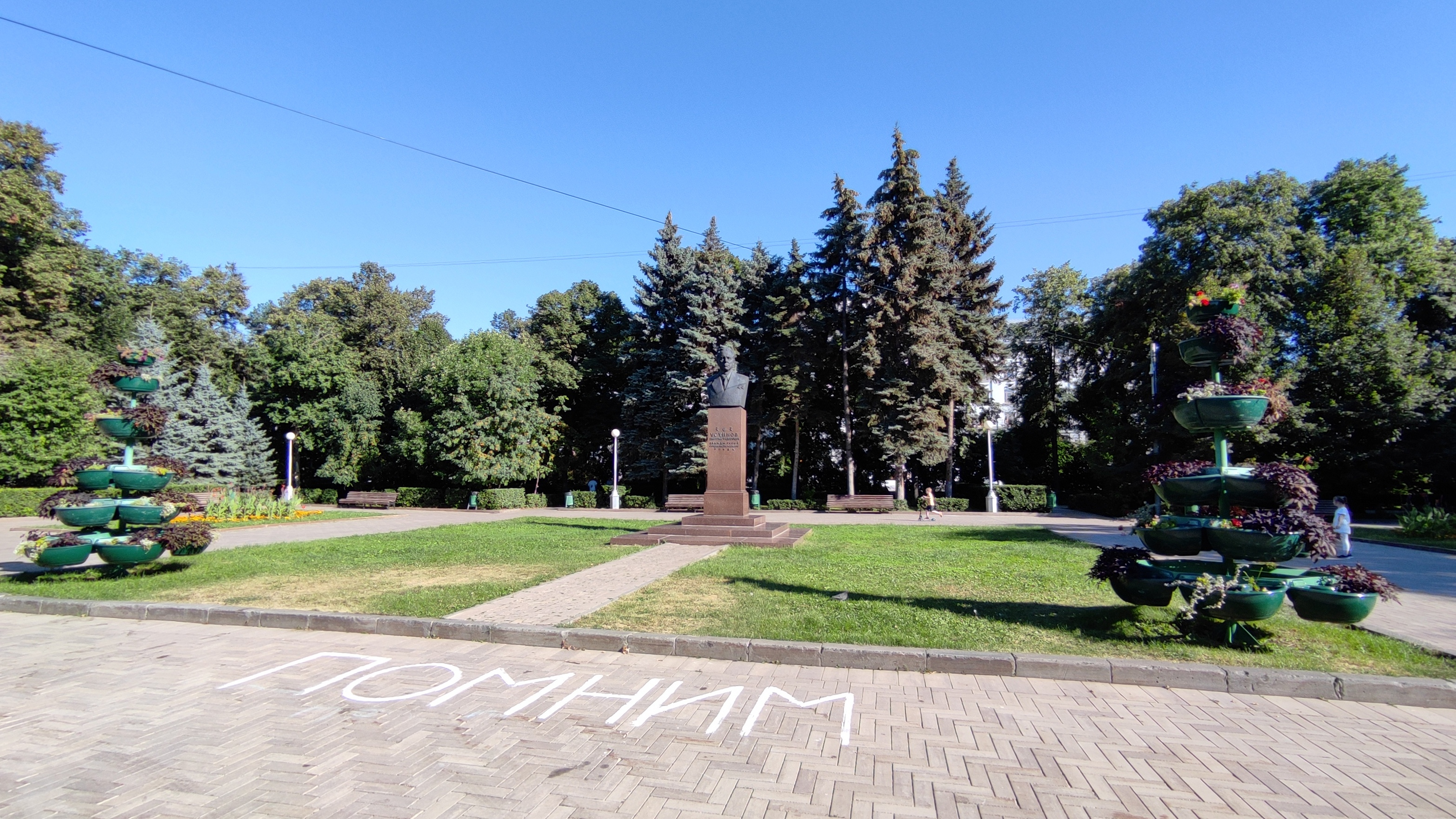
Ustinov Square in Samara with a bronze bust of him

On 7 November 1984, Ustinov did not preside over the annual Red Square Military Parade on the October Revolution Day. First Deputy Defense Minister Marshal Sergey Sokolov stood in for Ustinov to both inspect the troops and deliver the commemoration speech. Ustinov had contracted pneumonia in late October. Emergency surgery had to be performed to correct an aneurysm in his aortic valve. His liver and kidneys later deteriorated. Eventually, he suffered a cardiac arrest and died on 20 December 1984. He was honored with a state funeral, and his ashes were interred in the Kremlin Wall Necropolis on 24 December 1984.

The RFS Marshal Ustinov is a Russian warship named after him in his honor. The Baltic State Technical Military-Mechanical University in Saint Petersburg changed its name to the Ustinov Baltic State Technical Military-Mechanical University. The city of Izhevsk was also renamed after him from 1984 to 1987; however, under Mikhail Gorbachev, cities that had been renamed for recent Soviet leaders were reverted to their former names.

Ustinov placed great importance on the military for many decades. For example, he succeeded in always keeping the USSR's intercontinental ballistic missiles, ICBMs, current. Ustinov also wrote several books throughout his life. These included "Selected Speeches and Articles" (1979), and "To serve my country - the cause of Communism" (1982).

== Personality and family ==
In his memoirs Mikhail Gorbachev describes Ustinov as a man who normally had an energetic and bright personality. When Gorbachev was facing opposition in the Politburo shortly after Andropov's death, Ustinov told Gorbachev to "stand firm" and to "take heart".

Soviet Army Colonel General Igor Illarionov, an assistant of Ustinov for 30 years, described him as "the most Stalinist of all the Commissars". Indeed, Ustinov had been groomed by Stalin to maintain the established system. Illarionov also said that Ustinov, like many of his contemporaries, was shaped by his experiences in the Great Patriotic War. Illarionov described Ustinov as a man who was very passionate about his work and had a habit of working late at night and sleeping for a couple of hours during the day.

The former Chief of the 4th Main Directorate of the Ministry of Health, Academician Yevgeniy Chazov wrote about Ustinov: "I met him for the first time thanks to Andropov, who was his close friend. From the first moment I liked his will power, quick decision making, optimism, drive, expertise, combined with a certain simplicity and openness. In my mind, he represented the best representatives of the so-called command-and-control systems by which we defeated Germany during World War II. I think his only mistake, which he may not have realized, was the Afghan war. A bad politician and diplomat, he, as a representative of the old Stalinist 'guard', believed that all issues could be solved via a position of strength. On the other hand, I saw Andropov tossed and nervous because of the Afghan war. I believe that he ultimately understood their mistake. Ustinov, however, was always calm and apparently convinced that he was right."

However, Ustinov's unwillingness to support any kind of reforms, even if popular within the Politburo itself, led to him frequently clashing with the Chief of the General Staff, Marshal Nikolai Ogarkov. Ogarkov and many Officers of the General Staff resented Ustinov's influence over Brezhnev, viewing him as a lobby for the interests of the Defence Industries against those of the Military. This became problematic for Ogarkov, since he favoured reducing the massive Soviet military into a more compact strike force that utilized high-technology conventional arms and centered on Special Forces operations. Ustinov on the other hand (his lobbying for the defense industries notwithstanding), favored the usual emphasis on manpower and nuclear deterrence to maintain his "high intensity non-nuclear conflict" strategy, despite the lack of efficiency that became apparent in Afghanistan. In light of this, although Ustinov dramatically increased the technological capabilities of the Soviet Armed forces, most of the improvements were directed towards the operation of Strategic Nuclear Weapons, such as the Typhoon-class submarine, the Tu-160 bomber, and the SS-20 Saber.

Ustinov was married to Taisa Alekseevna Briekalova-Ustinova (1903–1975). They had a daughter and a son.

== In popular culture ==
Ustinov appears briefly in Tom Clancy's 1984 novel The Hunt for Red October in his capacity as Defense Minister; his death is mentioned by the titular spy Colonel Filitov in The Cardinal of the Kremlin. He is given a more important role in the 2002 novel Red Rabbit, which takes place in between the events of Patriot Games and Red October.

Ustinov is also a character of The Manhattan Projects, a comic book by Jonathan Hickman and Nick Pitarra. He is depicted as a disembodied brain mounted on a robot body.

== Honours and awards ==
=== Soviet ===
- Hero of the Soviet Union (1978)
- Hero of Socialist Labor, twice (1942, 1961)
- Order of Lenin, 11 times (1939, 1942, 1944, 1951, 1956, 1957, 1958, 1968, 1971, 1978, 1983)
- Order of Suvorov, 1st class (1945)
- Order of Kutuzov, 1st class (1944)
- Lenin Prize (1982)
- Stalin Prize winner, 1st class (1953)
- USSR State Prize (1983)
- campaign and jubilee medals

=== Foreign ===
Mongolian People's Republic

- Hero of the Mongolian People's Republic (6 August 1981)
- Order of Sukhbaatar, three times (1975, 1978, 1981)
- Order of the Red Banner (1983)
- 6 other medals

Czechoslovakia

- Hero of the Czechoslovak Socialist Republic (6 October 1982)
- Order of Klement Gottwald, twice (1978, 1983)
- Order of the White Lion, 1st class (1977)
- 2 other medals

Vietnam

- Order of Ho Chi Minh (1983)

Bulgaria

- Order of Georgi Dimitrov, twice (1976, 1983)
- 7 other medals

Poland

- Cross of Grunwald, 1st class (1976)

Peru

- Order of Aeronautical Merit

People's Republic of Hungary

- Order of the Flag of the People's Republic of Hungary with rubies, twice (1978, 1983)

Democratic Republic of Afghanistan

- Order of the Sun of Liberty (1982)

East Germany

- Order of Karl Marx, twice (1978, 1983)
- Scharnhorst Order (1977)

Finland

- Order of the White Rose, 1st class (1978)

Cuba

- Order of Playa Girón (1983)
- 2 other medals.

== Bibliography ==
- Bialer, Seweryn (1986). The Soviet Paradox: External Expansion, Internal Decline. Alfred A. Knopf. ISBN 0-394-54095-6.
- Gorbachev, Mikhail (1996). Memoirs: Mikhail Gorbachev. New York: Doubleday. ISBN 0-385-48019-9.
- Zubok, Vladislav (2007). A Failed Empire: The Soviet Union in the Cold War from Stalin To Gorbachev. Chapel Hill: University of North Carolina Press. ISBN 978-0807830987.

Political offices
Preceded by Andrei Grechko	Minister of Defense of the Soviet Union; 1976–1984	Succeeded by Sergei Sokolov
