= Secretariat of the 22nd Congress of the Communist Party of the Soviet Union =

The 22nd Secretariat of the Communist Party of the Soviet Union was elected by the 22nd Central Committee in the aftermath of the 22nd Congress.

== List of members ==
Name (birth–death)	Took office	Left office	Duration	Note
Nikita Khrushchev (1894–1971)	31 October 1961	14 October 1964	2 years, 349 days	Elected First Secretary at the 1st Plenary Session, and relieved of his duties at the 9th Plenary Session.
Leonid Brezhnev (1906–1982)	21 June 1963	8 April 1966	4 years, 159 days	Elected to the Secretariat at the 5th Plenary Session, and was elected First Secretary at the 9th Plenary Session.
Yuri Andropov (1914–1984)	23 November 1962	8 April 1966	3 years, 136 days	Elected at the 4th Plenary Session.
Pyotr Demichev (1918–2000)	31 October 1961	8 April 1966	4 years, 159 days	—
Leonid Ilyichev (1906–1990)	31 October 1961	26 March 1965	3 years, 146 days	Relieved of his duties at the 11th Plenary Session.
Ivan Kapitonov (1915–2002)	6 December 1965	8 April 1966	123 days	Elected at the 13th Plenary Session.
Frol Kozlov (1908–1965)	31 October 1961	16 November 1964	3 years, 16 days	Relieved of his duties at the 10th Plenary Session.
Fyodor Kulakov (1918–1978)	29 September 1965	8 April 1966	191 days	Elected at the 12th Plenary Session.
Otto Wille Kuusinen (1881–1964)	31 October 1961	17 May 1964	2 years, 199 days	—
Nikolai Podgorny (1903–1983)	21 June 1963	6 December 1965	2 years, 168 days	Elected at the 5th Plenary Session, and relieved of his duties at the 13th Plenary Session.
Boris Ponomarev (1905–1995)	31 October 1961	8 April 1966	4 years, 159 days	—
Vasily Polyakov (1913–2003)	23 November 1962	16 November 1964	1 year, 328 days	Elected at the 4th Plenary Session, and relieved of his duties at the 10th Plenary Session.
Aleksandr Rudakov (1910–1966)	23 November 1962	8 April 1966	3 years, 136 days	Elected at the 4th Plenary Session.
Alexander Shelepin (1918–1994)	31 October 1961	8 April 1966	4 years, 159 days	—
Ivan Spiridonov (1905–1991)	31 October 1961	23 April 1962	174 days	Relieved of his duties at the 3rd Plenary Session.
Mikhail Suslov (1902–1982)	31 October 1961	8 April 1966	4 years, 159 days	—
Vitaly Titov (1907–1980)	31 October 1961	29 September 1965	3 years, 333 days	Relieved of his duties at the 12th Plenary Session.
Dmitriy Ustinov (1908–1984)	26 March 1965	8 April 1966	1 year, 13 days	Elected at the 11th Plenary Session.
