= Nikolai Podgorny =

Soviet Ukrainian politician (1903–1983)

- Николай Подгорный
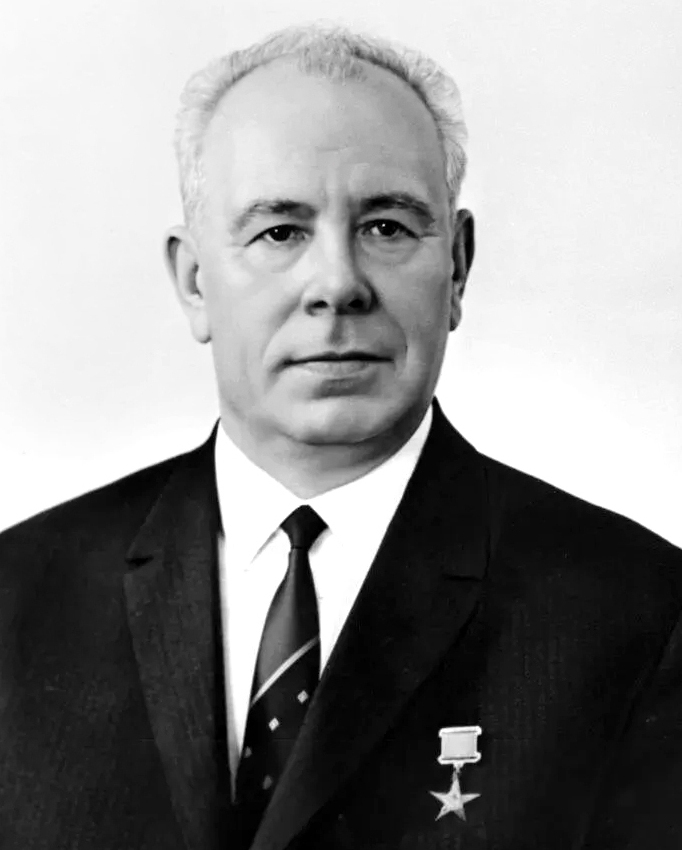
- Official portrait, 1973

Chairman of the Presidium of the Supreme Soviet of the Soviet Union
- In office 9 December 1965 – 16 June 1977
- Premier: Alexei Kosygin
- Preceded by: Anastas Mikoyan
- Succeeded by: Leonid Brezhnev

Second Secretary of the Communist Party of the Soviet Union
- In office 14 October 1964 – 6 December 1965
- Preceded by: Leonid Brezhnev
- Succeeded by: Mikhail Suslov

First Secretary of the Communist Party of Ukraine
- In office 26 December 1957 – 2 July 1963
- Preceded by: Alexei Kirichenko
- Succeeded by: Petro Shelest

Personal details
- Born: 18 February [O.S. 5 February] 1903 Karlovka, Russian Empire (now Karlivka, Ukraine)
- Died: 12 January 1983 (aged 79) Moscow, Soviet Union
- Resting place: Novodevichy Cemetery, Moscow
- Party: Communist Party of the Soviet Union (1930–1976)
- Spouse: Natalya Nikolayevna Podgornaya (1908–1995)
- Children: Natalia and Lesia
- Profession: Mechanical engineer, civil servant
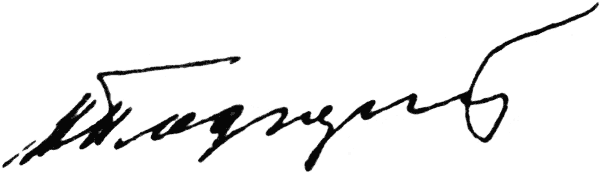
- Signature
- Central institution membership: 1963–1965: Member, 22nd Secretariat; 1960–1977: Full member, 20th/21st, 22nd, 23rd, 24th & 25th Politburo; 1958–1960: Candidate member, 20th Presidium; 1952–1982: Full member, 20th, 21st, 22nd, 23rd, 24th, & 25th Central Committee; Other political offices held: 1953–1957: Second Secretary, Communist Party of Ukraine; Jan.–Mar. 1958: Deputy Chairman, Bureau of the Central Committee of the Russian SFSR; 1950–1953: First Secretary, Kharkiv Regional Committee of the Communist Party of Ukraine; 1944–1946: Deputy People's Commissar of the Food Industry, Council of People's Commissars of the Ukrainian SSR; 1942–1944: Director, Moscow Technological Institute of Food Industry; 1940–1942: Deputy People's Commissar of the Food Industry, Council of People's Commissars of the USSR; 1939–1940: Deputy People's Commissar of the Food Industry, Council of People's Commissars of the Ukrainian SSR

Nikolai Viktorovich Podgorny (Note: Ukrainian: Микола Вікторович Підгорний, Mykola Viktorovych Pidhornyy Russian: Никола́й Ви́кторович Подго́рный, IPA: [nʲɪkɐˈlaj ˈvʲiktərəvʲɪtɕ pɐdˈgornɨj]) (18 February [O.S. 5 February] 1903 – 12 January 1983) was a Soviet statesman who served as the Chairman of the Presidium of the Supreme Soviet, the head of state of the Soviet Union, from 1965 to 1977.

Podgorny was born to a Ukrainian working-class family in the city of Karlovka on 18 February 1903. He later graduated from a local worker's school in 1926 before completing his education at the Kiev Technological Institute of Food Industry in 1931. In 1930, Podgorny became a member of the ruling Communist Party of the Soviet Union and climbed up the Soviet hierarchy after years of service to the country's centrally planned economy. By 1953, Podgorny became Second Secretary of the Communist Party of Ukraine, before later serving as First Secretary of the Communist Party of Ukraine from 1957 to 1963.

In October 1964, Podgorny participated in a coup replacing Soviet leader Nikita Khrushchev. Thereafter, as a member of the collective leadership, Podgorny formed an unofficial Triumvirate (also known by its Russian name Troika) alongside Premier Alexei Kosygin and First Secretary Leonid Brezhnev. On 6 December 1965, he replaced Anastas Mikoyan as Chairman of the Presidium of the Supreme Soviet. After Kosygin's standing was damaged in the wake of the Prague Spring crisis in 1968, Podgorny emerged as the second-most powerful figure in the country behind Brezhnev. Thereafter, his influence over policy declined as Brezhnev consolidated his control over the regime. By June 1977, he was removed as Chairman of the Presidium as well as a member of the Politburo. Upon his removal from the Soviet leadership, Podgorny was forced to resign from active politics, and was sidelined in Soviet affairs until his death in 1983.

== Early life ==
Nikolai Viktorovich Podgorny was born on 18 February [O.S. 5 February] 1903 in Karlovka, Russian Empire (now Ukraine), to a Ukrainian working-class family. After the Russian Revolution in 1917, Podgorny became one of the founders of the Karlovka branch of the Komsomol, and served as a Secretary of the Komsomol from 1921 to 1923. Podgorny started work at the age of 17 as a student at the mechanical workshops in Karlovka. In 1926, Podgorny graduated from a local workers' school. In 1930, Podgorny became a member of the All-Union Communist Party (Bolsheviks), the ruling party of the Soviet Union.

In 1931, Podgorny graduated from the Kiev Technological Institute of Food Industry and started working in the sugar industry. Podgorny was promoted to deputy chief engineer of Vinnytsia in 1937 and was promoted in 1939 as the chief engineer of the Kamenetz-Podolsk Oblast sugar trusts. By the end of 1939, Podgorny had become Deputy People's Commissar for Food Industry of the Ukrainian Soviet Socialist Republic (Ukrainian SSR). The next year, Podgorny was appointed Deputy People's Commissar for Food Industry of the Soviet Union.

== Rise to the Soviet leadership (1942–1964) ==
Podgorny became the Director of the Moscow Technological Institute of Food Industry in 1942 during World War II. After the liberation of Ukraine from Nazi Germany, Podgorny reestablished Soviet control over Ukraine on the orders of the Ukrainian SSR and the Soviet Government. In the post-war years, Podgorny regained his old office of Deputy People's Commissar for Food Industry of the Ukrainian SSR, but was later appointed in 1946 as a Permanent Representative to the Council of Ministers of the Ukrainian SSR. In April 1950, he was made First Secretary of the Kharkiv Regional Committee of the Communist Party of Ukraine (CPU). In 1953, Podgorny was elevated to Second Secretary of the Central Committee (CC) of the CPU. From 1957 to 1963, Podgorny was First Secretary of the CC of the CPU, effectively the most powerful position in Ukraine. In this role, Podgorny worked on reorganising and modernising the Ukrainian economy, which had been destroyed during the war years. He worked to increase the rate of industrial and agricultural production and to improve people's welfare. He paid particular attention to improving party organisation and educating new cadres.

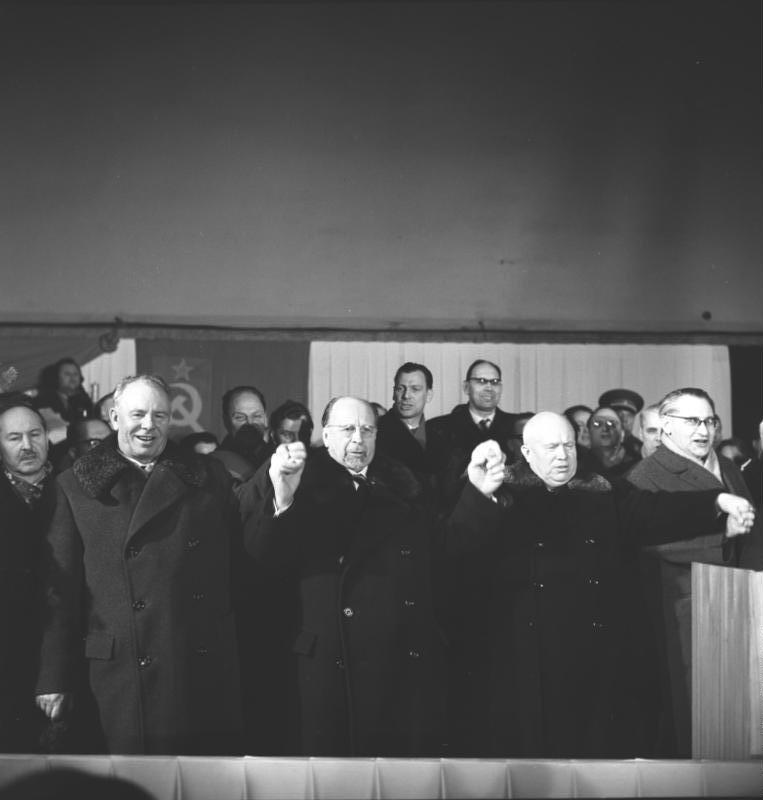
Nikolai Podgorny (second from left) at East Germany's 6th Party Conference with Soviet leader Nikita Khrushchev (second from right) in 1963.

In 1960, Podgorny became a member of the Politburo (Political Bureau), the highest policy-making authority in the Soviet Union. By 1963, Podgorny had risen to prominence within the Soviet hierarchy as a member of the Secretariat of the Communist Party of the Soviet Union (CPSU). As a protégé and close companion of Soviet leader Nikita Khrushchev, he travelled with him to the United Nations headquarters in 1960. Podgorny acted as a Soviet emissary to Czechoslovakia, East Germany, Canada, and Yugoslavia. Podgorny's beliefs were strongly influenced by Khrushchev, and under Leonid Brezhnev's rule, Podgorny was one of the most liberal members within the Soviet leadership, even more liberal than Premier Alexei Kosygin.

Podgorny briefly fell out of Khrushchev's favor in 1961 when he blamed bad corn yields in the Ukrainian SSR on "bad weather", while Khrushchev claimed the crops had been "stolen" and "pilfered". However, in 1962, Podgorny reported to Khrushchev that agricultural output had again increased: Under Podgorny's leadership, the Ukrainian SSR had doubled Ukraine's supply of grain to the state from the previous year. Because of his handling of agriculture, First World commentators saw Podgorny as one of Khrushchev's many potential heirs.

According to historian Ilya Zemtsov, the author of Chernenko: The Last Bolshevik: The Soviet Union on the Eve of Perestroika, Brezhnev began starting a conspiracy against Khrushchev when he found out that he had chosen Podgorny, and not himself, as his potential successor. During the 1964 ouster to remove Khrushchev as First Secretary and Premier, Podgorny and Brezhnev appealed to the Central Committee, blaming Khrushchev for economic failures and accusing him of voluntarism and immodest behaviour. Influenced by Brezhnev and his allies, Politburo members voted to remove Khrushchev from office.

== Post-Khrushchev troika (1964–1977) ==
=== Struggle for power ===
In the aftermath of Khrushchev's removal, a collective leadership known as a troika was formed, headed by Brezhnev as First Secretary, Alexei Kosygin as head of government, and Anastas Mikoyan as head of state. Before becoming head of state, Podgorny served as the party's Second Secretary, and was therefore in charge of the Party's Organisational Division. In this capacity, Podgorny threatened Brezhnev's position as First Secretary because the Organisational Division, if Podgorny chose so, could easily be turned into his own power base within the party. Due to this risk, Brezhnev allied himself with Alexander Shelepin, the KGB chairman, to oppose both Podgorny and Kosygin.

Podgorny's position was constantly threatened by Brezhnev and his allies. In an article in Ekonomicheskaya Gazeta from February 1965, the newspaper criticised the Kharkiv Party organisation which Podgorny had previously headed, but also its management of the economy. By indirectly criticising Podgorny, the article raised doubts about his qualifications as a leading member of the Soviet leadership. Podgorny launched a counterattack in his 1965 speech in Baku, Azerbaijani Soviet Socialist Republic, where he criticised the Soviet leadership's heavy industrial policy. This, as it turned out, would be a move he would regret for life. Instead of offending just Brezhnev and Shelepin, he offended the whole conservative wing of the leadership. To make matters even worse for Podgorny, Mikhail Suslov, who had kept outside of the conflict, sided with Brezhnev, and called his views "revisionist". Later in December 1965, Podgorny relinquished his seat in the Secretariat, and took Mikoyan's place as Chairman of the Presidium of the Supreme Soviet. According to Ilya Zemstov, his departure from the Secretariat signaled the end of his wish to assume the First Secretaryship.

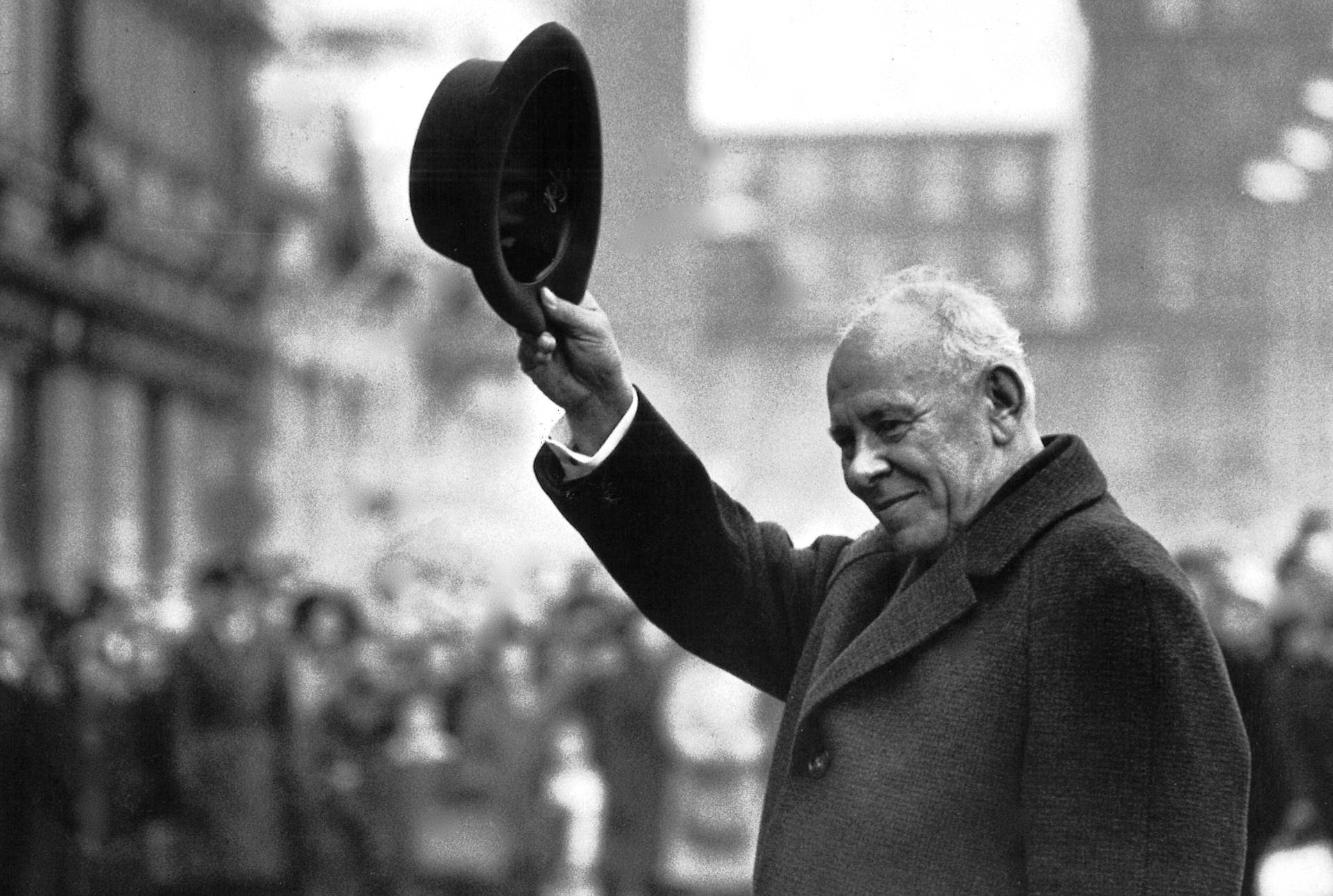
Podgorny visiting Tampere, Finland in 1969

The majority of Politburo members under Brezhnev were conservative communists. Even so, Podgorny remained one of the most liberal-minded members in the Era of Stagnation. Other liberal-minded Politburo members included Kosygin and Andrei Kirilenko. Factionalism within the Soviet leadership in the 1960s led Podgorny to become more active; he held several speeches in Moscow and went on numerous state visits at the expense of Brezhnev and Kosygin's popularity. There was speculation in Soviet society that Podgorny was trying to replace Kosygin as Premier, or even Brezhnev as General Secretary, due to his increasing presence in the late 1960s.

In 1971, the 24th Party Congress affirmed Brezhnev's and Kosygin's status as the leadership's current highest-ranking figures but Podgorny nevertheless showed that he remained a major player in Soviet politics by leading delegations to China and North Vietnam later that year. As Brezhnev adopted more liberal positions, Podgorny attracted support among hardline communists by opposing his conciliatory stance towards Yugoslavia, disarmament deals with the West, and pressuring of East Germany into conceding to the Berlin negotiations. In the Politburo, Podgorny could count on the support of Gennady Voronov and Petro Shelest. Additionally, when Podgorny and Kosygin actually agreed on something Brezhnev would find himself in the minority, and forced to follow their decisions. However, such an opportunity was often ignored due to how frequently Podgorny found himself in conflict with Kosygin over policy issues. Ultimately, the collective leadership was rendered powerless in the late 1970s when Brezhnev achieved all but complete control over the Politburo.

=== Diplomatic protocol as head of state ===
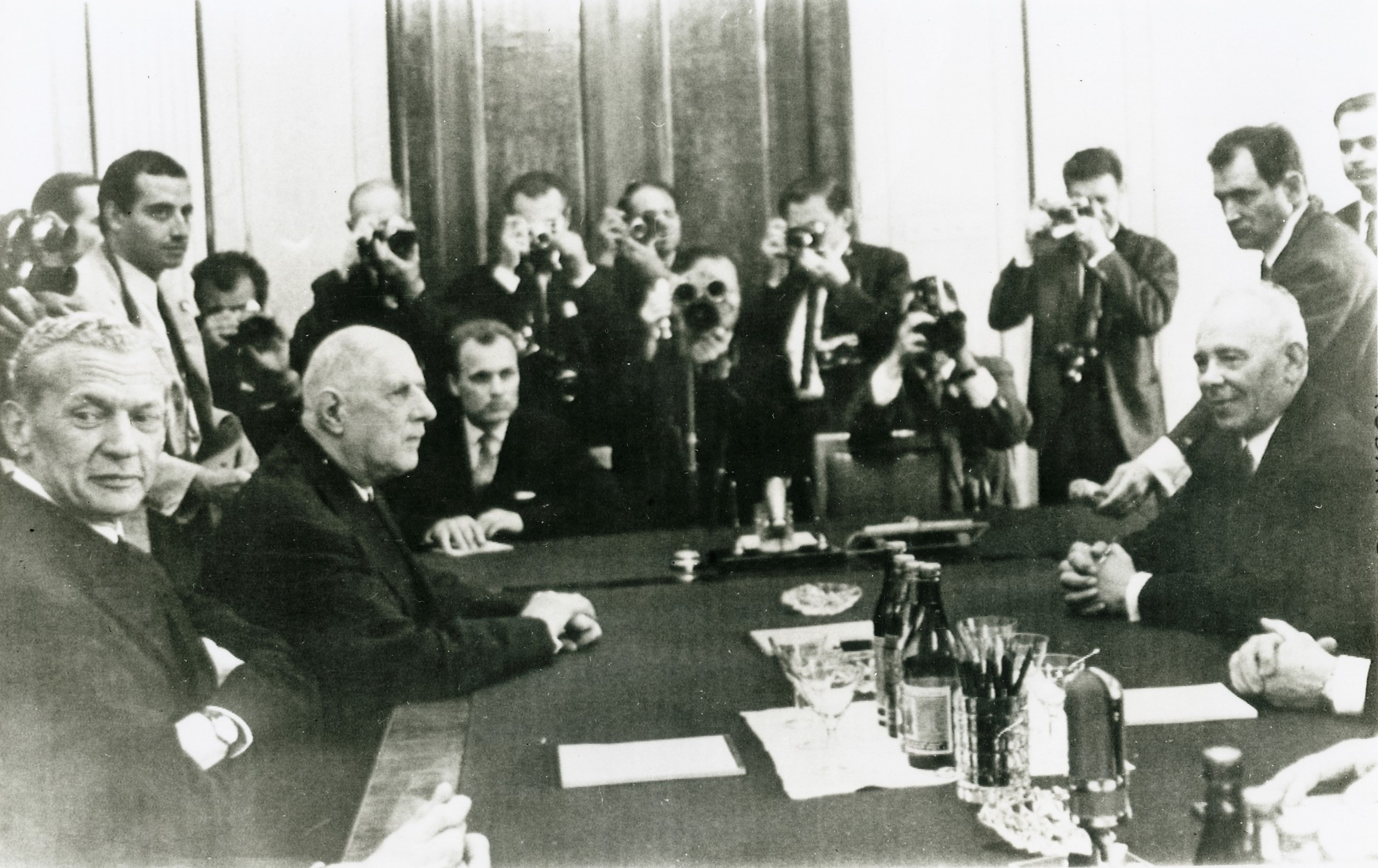
In his capacity as head of state, Podgorny (seated right) meets French President Charles de Gaulle (seated left) in Moscow.

In 1967, just before the outbreak of the Six-Day War, Podgorny delivered an intelligence report to Egyptian Vice President Anwar Sadat which claimed, falsely, that Israeli troops were massing along the Syrian border. In 1971, Podgorny went on two state visits, the first to the People's Republic of China (PRC) and the second to North Vietnam; Kosygin went on a visit to Canada while Brezhnev visited Yugoslavia. Podgorny frequently paid visits to North Vietnam during the Vietnam War to discuss Soviet-Vietnamese foreign relations. In 1973, Podgorny visited Finland and Mohammad Daoud Khan's Afghanistan.

Brezhnev conspired to oust Podgorny as early as 1970. The reason was simple: Brezhnev was third, while Podgorny was first in the ranking of Soviet diplomatic protocol. Since September 1970, Brezhnev tried to form an opposition in the Politburo to oust Podgorny. According to Time, "There was some speculation in Moscow" that if Brezhnev did not succeed in removing Podgorny he would establish a Council of State modelled after institutions found in, for example, East Germany, the People's Republic of Bulgaria and the Socialist Republic of Romania. The post of Chairman of the Council of State would give Brezhnev the top state and party job in the USSR. Brezhnev's backers were unable, and did not even try, to remove Podgorny from the head of state post at the 1970 Central Committee plenum. Brezhnev could count on only five votes, while another seven Politburo members were opposed to granting Brezhnev more power. Under such circumstances, removing Podgorny would be condemned among the Soviet elite for violating the principle of collective leadership.

=== Later tenure ===
President Richard Nixon and Chairman Nikolai Podgorny Shaking Hands at the Moscow Summit, May 1972

In the early 1970s, Brezhnev strengthened Podgorny's position at the expense of Premier Kosygin by giving the Presidium executive powers. As a result of these changes, the post of Chairman of the Presidium changed from a largely honorary office to the second most important office in the USSR. Pleased by the extension of powers given to the Supreme Soviet, Podgorny saw little threat to his position, even if a Central Committee resolution from 1971 had called for the expansion of Party activities in the Soviets.

Unbeknownst to Podgorny, Brezhnev felt threatened by his new authority and ordered Konstantin Chernenko to review the 1936 Soviet Constitution for a way to weaken Podgorny's position. As it turned out there were none under current Soviet law. As the head of state, Podgorny could block any measures taken by Brezhnev to circumscribe his powers. Chernenko's solution to this dilemma was to make it law that the Party leader could also become the Chairman of the Presidium. Consequently, a new constitution was drafted to include such a provision. On 7 October 1977, the 1977 Soviet Constitution which affirmed the Party's supremacy in Soviet society was approved by the Soviet leadership. The approval of the 1977 Soviet Constitution is considered Podgorny's death knell.

=== Removal ===
Podgorny's removal from office in 1977 has become the most notable example of power transfer in the late Brezhnev Era. According to Robert Vincent Daniels, Podgorny was, before his removal, the second most powerful man in the Soviet Union, behind Brezhnev but ahead of Premier Kosygin. Though there were some Sovietologists who foresaw Podgorny's fall, the decision to remove Podgorny from the Politburo took the world by surprise. On 24 May 1977, a unanimous vote was taken by the Central Committee after Grigory Romanov proposed removing Podgorny from the Politburo. The vote seemed to have taken Podgorny by surprise, and immediately after the vote, he got up from his politburo seat to instead sit with the ordinary members. Podgorny was nominally still Chairman of the Presidium, but his leadership had ended. After his removal from the Politburo, Podgorny's name disappeared from Soviet media. The Soviet media told the Soviet people that he had retired due to his stance against détente and producing more consumer goods. Twenty-three days after his removal from the Politburo, Podgorny lost his Chairmanship of the Presidium on 16 June 1977.

Due to his advanced age, Brezhnev was regarded as too old to carry out some of the functions of head of state. The Supreme Soviet, on Brezhnev's orders, established the new post of First Deputy Chairman of the Presidium of the Supreme Soviet, an office equivalent to the post of Vice President. Vasili Kuznetsov, at the age of 76, was unanimously approved by the Supreme Soviet as First Deputy Chairman of the Presidium.

== Retirement, death and recognition ==
Podgorny's life after his resignation is not well documented. The last mention of him in any major Soviet media was his meeting with Urho Kekkonen, the President of Finland. There was never any explanation given, nor a denunciation of him, by the Soviet authorities. Podgorny retained his seat in the Supreme Soviet after his downfall. He was seen at the 61st anniversary reception of the October Revolution at the Grand Palace of the Kremlin in November 1978 by Tokichiro Uomoto, the Japanese Ambassador to the Soviet Union. Podgorny spoke to Brezhnev, Kosygin, and then to Andrei Gromyko, all of whom looked embarrassed by the presence of Podgorny, according to Uomoto. Soon after this incident, Podgorny lost his seat in the Supreme Soviet. In Tretyakov Gallery, Podgorny was removed from the 1977 painting of the Soviet leaders at the Red Square by Dmitry Nalbandyan in which Podgorny stood between Brezhnev and Kosygin. Podgorny died of cancer in Kiev on 12 January 1983, and was buried in Moscow at the Novodevichy Cemetery.

As with many other high-standing Soviet officials, Podgorny was honoured with several awards. He was awarded five Orders of Lenin, one Order of the Red Banner and several medals, as well as being awarded several foreign state prizes by Bangladesh, the People's Republic of Bulgaria, the Mongolian People's Republic, the Czechoslovak Socialist Republic, and Finland.

== Bibliography ==
- Daniels, Robert Vincent (1998). Russia's Transformation: Snapshots of a Crumbling System. Rowman & Littlefield. ISBN 0-8476-8709-0.
- Law, David A. (1975). Russian Civilization. Ardent Media. ISBN 0-8422-0529-2.
- Zemtsov, Ilya (1989). Chernenko: The Last Bolshevik: The Soviet Union on the Eve of Perestroika. Transaction Publishers. ISBN 0-88738-260-6.

Party political offices
Preceded by Leonid Brezhnev	Second Secretary of the Communist Party of the Soviet Union; October 14, 1964 – December 6, 1965	Succeeded by Mikhail Suslov
Preceded by Frol Kozlov	Senior Secretary of Cadres of the Communist Party of the Soviet Union; June 21, 1963 – December 6, 1965	Succeeded by Alexander Shelepin
Preceded by Aleksei Kirichenko	First Secretary of the Communist Party of Ukraine; December 26, 1957– July 2, 1963	Succeeded by Pyotr Shelest
Preceded by Viktor Churayev	1st Secretary of the Communist Party of Kharkiv Oblast; 1950–1953	Succeeded by Vitaliy Titov
Political offices
Preceded by Anastas Mikoyan	Chairman of the Presidium of the Supreme Soviet; December 9, 1965 – June 16, 1977	Succeeded by Leonid Brezhnev
