= Raisa Belskikh =

Russian agronomist

- Раиса Бельских
- Born: Raisa Alekseevna Belskikh; 28 April 1934; Bereznyagovka, Usmansky District, Central Black Earth Oblast, Russian Soviet Federative Socialist Republic
- Died: 13 July 2012 (aged 78)
- Occupation: Agronomist
- Years active: 1957–2000
- Awards: Hero of Socialist Labour; Order of Lenin (x2)

Raisa Alekseevna Belskikh (Russian: Раиса Алексеевна Бельских; 28 April 1934 – 13 July 2012) was a Russian agronomist. She was a branch agronomist at the Mikhailovsky sugar beet state farm until she was promoted to branch manager. Belskikh was later director of the Leninsky Put state farm and was involved in the women's movement in the Novousmansky District. She was a candidate member of the Central Committee of the Communist Party of the Soviet Union from 1966 to 1971. Belskikh was awarded two Orders of Lenin and the title of Hero of Socialist Labour.

== Early life ==
Belskikh was born in the village of Bereznyagovka, Usmansky District, Central Black Earth Oblast (today the Lipetsk Oblast) on 28 April 1934. She was the eleventh and youngest child of her peasant family. When Belskikh was four years old, she and her family relocated to the village of Dryazgi. She was educated at the seven-year school in Dryazgi and then at the secondary school in the village of Oktyabrskoye. Belskikh graduated from the agronomy department of the Voronezh State Agrarian University in 1957.

== Career ==
After graduation, she was sent to work as a branch agronomist at the Mikhailovsky sugar beet state farm, Paninsky District in 1957, and was mentored by Stepan Stepanovich Ivakhnenko. Belskikh left the job in 1961. Between 1961 and 1973, she served as branch manager at the Mikhailovsky state farm. In 1973, Belskikh moved to Novaya Usman. She was appointed director of the Leninsky Put state farm, Novousmansky District and she remained in the job until 1989. During her directorship, the farm commissioned 270 apartments, 100 of which had all the necessary amenities. Belskikh oversaw the construction of a potato storage facility, a two-story livestock farmouse, a feed mill, two poultry houses, five cattle sheds paved a threshing floor with a powerful grain cleaning machine, a grain warehouse, and a garage, and installed a sawmill. The Leninsky Put state farm became a leader in the region in milk yield, grain yield, and potato production. After retiring, she was chair of the district environmental protection committee for 11 years.

In 1960, Belskikh joined the Communist Party of the Soviet Union. At the 23rd Congress of the Communist Party of the Soviet Union, she was elected as a candidate member of the Central Committee of the Communist Party of the Soviet Union from 1966 to 1971. Additionally, Belskikh was elected as a deputy of the District Council and a member of the Voronezh Regional Committee of the CPSU. She led the women's movement in the Novousmansky District. From the start, Belskikh organised public discussions around women's issues, conducted checks and assistance for disadvantaged families, provided employment and childcare vouchers to single mothers, allocated apartments to large families, organised summer vacations for children from low-income families, district and village celebrations dedicated to International Women's Day (8 March) and Mother's Day became a tradition. Using her authority and the support of local government bodies, farm and enterprise leaders, Belskikh raised funds to provide gifts for working women in the district, mothers of large families, and the district's workers.

== Death ==
She died on 13 July 2012, and was buried in Novaya Usman.

== Recognition ==
Belskikh was awarded the title of Hero of Socialist Labour and the Order of Lenin and the Hammer and Sickle gold medal by the Decree of the Presidium of the Supreme Soviet of the Soviet Union on 23 June 1966. In 1967, she was awarded the Gold Medal of the Exhibition of Achievements of National Economy. Belskikh was awarded a second Order of Lenin in 1971. Two busts of her were installed in the village of Panino and Novaya Usman.
