= Aleksei Adzhubei =

Soviet journalist

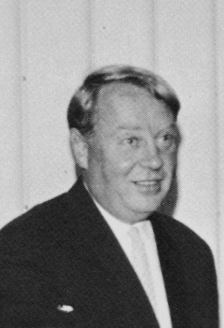
Adzhubei in 1963

Aleksei Ivanovich Adzhubei (Russian: Алексей Иванович Аджубей; 9 January 1924 – 19 March 1993) was a Soviet journalist who once worked for Komsomolskaya Pravda and Izvestia. He was a member of Supreme Soviet of the Soviet Union and Central Committee of the Communist Party of the Soviet Union.

His wife was Rada Khrushchev, the daughter of Nikita Khrushchev, the leader of the Soviet Union. On 25 November 1961, he interviewed John F. Kennedy at Hyannis Port, Massachusetts.

In Russia, there was a joke that satirizes Adzhubei's career. It runs as “Don't have a hundred roubles, marry like Adzhubei”.
