= Vasily Smirnov (writer) =

Soviet writer

Vasily Aleksandrovich Smirnov (Russian: Васи́лий Алекса́ндрович Смирно́в; 13 January [O.S. 31 December 1904] 1905, Sinitsyno, Myshkinsky Uyezd – 19 October 1979, Moscow) was a Soviet writer.

Having published his first work in 1924, Smirnov became a member of the CPSU in 1925. In 1960–1965, he was the editor-in-chief of the Druzhba Narodov magazine.
