= Tatyana Nikolayeva (politician) =

Soviet and Russian politician

Tatyana Nikolayevna Nikolayeva (Russian: Татьяна Николаевна Николаева; 25 December 1919 – 20 January 2022) was a Soviet and Russian politician.

She was First Secretary of the Ivanovo City Committee of the CPSU (1959) and Candidate member of the Central Committee of the Communist Party of the Soviet Union (1961–1971). Nikolayeva died on 20 January 2022, at the age of 102.
