= Central Committee of the 18th Congress of the All-Union Communist Party (Bolsheviks) =

The Central Committee of the 18th Congress of the All-Union Communist Party (Bolsheviks) was in session from 1939 until 1952, and was replenished in 1941. It elected, at its 1st Plenary Session, the Politburo, the Secretariat, the Orgburo and the Party Control Commission. Its 71 members and 68 candidate members were elected at the 18th Party Congress.

== Plenums ==
The CC was not a permanent institution. The CC was convened for 10 plenary sessions between the 18th Congress and the 19th Congress. When the CC was not in session, decision-making powers were transferred to inner bodies of the CC itself; the Politburo, Secretariat and Orgburo (none of these bodies were permanent either, but convened to decide on crucial matters).

Plenary sessions of the Central Committee
| Plenum | Date | Length |
|---|---|---|
| 1st Plenary Session | 22 March 1939 | 1 day |
| 2nd Plenary Session | 21–24, 27 July 1939 | 5 days |
| 3rd Plenary Session | 26–28 March 1940 | 4 days |
| 4th Plenary Session | 29–31 July 1940 | 3 days |
| 5th Plenary Session | 21 February 1941 | 1 day |
| 6th Plenary Session | 5 May 1941 | 1 day |
| 7th Plenary Session | 27 January 1944 | 1 day |
| 8th Plenary Session | 11, 14, 18 March 1946 | 3 days |
| 9th Plenary Session | 21–22, 24, 26 February 1947 | 4 days |
| 10th Plenary Session | 15 August 1952 | 1 day |

== Composition ==
=== Members ===
Members of the Central Committee of the 18th Congress of the All-Union Communist Party (Bolsheviks)
| Name | Cyrillic | 17th CC | 18th Con. | 19th CC | Birth | Death | PM | Ethnicity | Gender |
|---|---|---|---|---|---|---|---|---|---|
| Andrey Andreyev | Андрей Андреев | Old | Renewed | Reelected | 1895 | 1971 | 1914 | Russian | Male |
| Vasily Andrianov | Василий Андрианов | New | Renewed | Reelected | 1902 | 1978 | 1926 | Russian | Male |
| Naum Antselovich | Наум Анцелович | New | Recalled | Died | 1888 | 1952 | 1905 | Russian | Male |
| Aleksei Badayev | Алексей Бадаев | Old | Renewed | Died | 1883 | 1951 | 1904 | Russian | Male |
| Mir Jafar Baghirov | Мир Джафар Багиров | Old | Renewed | Reelected | 1896 | 1956 | 1917 | Azerbaijani | Male |
| Ivan Benediktov | Иван Бенедиктов | New | Candidate | — | 1902 | 1983 | 1930 | Russian | Male |
| Lavrentiy Beria | Лаврентий Берия | New | Renewed | Reelected | 1899 | 1953 | 1917 | Georgian | Male |
| Gennady Borkov | Геннадий Борков | New | Renewed | Reelected | 1905 | 1983 | 1924 | Russian | Male |
| Semyon Budyonny | Семён Будённый | Candidate | Renewed | Candidate | 1883 | 1973 | 1919 | Russian | Male |
| Nikolai Bulganin | Николай Булганин | Old | Renewed | Reelected | 1895 | 1975 | 1917 | Russian | Male |
| Mykhailo Burmystenko | Михаил Бурмистенко | New | Renewed | WWII | 1902 | 1941 | 1919 | Ukrainian | Male |
| Vladimir Dekanozov | Владимир Деканозов | Candidate | Promoted | Not | 1898 | 1953 | 1920 | Georgian | Male |
| Vladimir Donskoi | Владимир Донской | New | Renewed | Removed | 1903 | 1954 | 1925 | Russian | Male |
| Boris Dvinskiy | Борис Двинский | New | Renewed | Candidate | 1894 | 1973 | 1920 | Russian | Male |
| Alexander Fadeyev | Александр Фадеев | New | Renewed | Reelected | 1901 | 1956 | 1918 | Russian | Male |
| Lazar Kaganovich | Лазарь Каганович | Old | Renewed | Reelected | 1893 | 1991 | 1911 | Jewish | Male |
| Mikhail Kaganovich | Михаил Каганович | Old | Renewed | Suicide | 1888 | 1941 | 1905 | Jewish | Male |
| Mikhail Kalinin | Михаил Калинин | Old | Renewed | Died | 1875 | 1946 | 1898 | Russian | Male |
| Nikita Khrushchev | Никита Хрущёв | Old | Renewed | Reelected | 1894 | 1971 | 1918 | Russian | Male |
| Leonid Korniyets | Леонид Корниец | New | Renewed | Candidate | 1901 | 1969 | 1926 | Ukrainian | Male |
| Demyan Korotchenko | Демьян Коротченко | New | Renewed | Reelected | 1894 | 1969 | 1918 | Ukrainian | Male |
| Alexei Kosygin | Алексей Косыгин | New | Renewed | Reelected | 1904 | 1980 | 1927 | Russian | Male |
| Grigory Kulik | Григорий Кулик | New | Renewed | Sentenced | 1890 | 1950 | 1917 | Ukrainian | Male |
| Otto Kuusinen | Отто Куусинен | Not | Elected | Reelected | 1881 | 1964 | 1918 | Finnish | Male |
| Alexey Kuznetsov | Алексей Кузнецов | New | Renewed | Sentenced | 1905 | 1950 | 1925 | Russian | Male |
| Nikolay Kuznetsov | Николай Кузнецов | New | Renewed | Reelected | 1902 | 1974 | 1925 | Russian | Male |
| Ivan Likhachev | Иван Лихачёв | New | Recalled | Not | 1896 | 1956 | 1917 | Russian | Male |
| Maxim Litvinov | Максим Литвинов | Old | Recalled | Died | 1876 | 1951 | 1898 | Russian | Male |
| Solomon Lozovsky | Соломон Лозовский | Old | Renewed | Expelled | 1892 | 1952 | 1901 | Jewish | Male |
| Pyotr Lyubavin | Пётр Любавин | New | Renewed | WWII | 1896 | 1941 | 1919 | Ukrainian | Male |
| Georgy Malenkov | Георги Маленков | New | Renewed | Reelected | 1902 | 1988 | 1920 | Russian | Male |
| Vyacheslav Malyshev | Вячеслав Малышев | New | Renewed | Reelected | 1902 | 1957 | 1926 | Russian | Male |
| Dmitry Manuilsky | Дмитрий Мануильский | Old | Renewed | Not | 1883 | 1959 | 1903 | Ukrainian | Male |
| Lev Mekhlis | Лев Мехлис | Old | Renewed | Reelected | 1889 | 1953 | 1918 | Jewish | Male |
| Fedor Merkulov | Фёдор Меркулов | New | Recalled | Not | 1900 | 1956 | 1919 | Russian | Male |
| Vsevolod Merkulov | Всеволод Меркулов | New | Renewed | Candidate | 1895 | 1953 | 1925 | Russian | Male |
| Nikolay Mikhailov | Николай Михайлов | New | Renewed | Reelected | 1906 | 1982 | 1930 | Russian | Male |
| Anastas Mikoyan | Анастас Микоян | Old | Renewed | Reelected | 1895 | 1978 | 1915 | Armenian | Male |
| Mark Mitin | Марк Митин | New | Renewed | Reelected | 1901 | 1987 | 1919 | Jewish | Male |
| Vyacheslav Molotov | Вячеслав Молотов | Old | Renewed | Reelected | 1890 | 1986 | 1906 | Russian | Male |
| Klavdiya Nikolayeva | Клавдия Николаева | Old | Renewed | Died | 1893 | 1944 | 1909 | Russian | Female |
| Vladimir Nikitin | Владимир Никитин | New | Renewed | Not | 1907 | 1959 | 1925 | Russian | Male |
| Nikolai Patolichev | Николай Патоличев | New | Promoted | Reelected | 1908 | 1989 | 1928 | Russian | Male |
| Nikolai Pegov | Николай Пегов | New | Renewed | Reelected | 1905 | 1991 | 1930 | Russian | Male |
| Mikhail Pervukhin | Михаил Первухин | New | Renewed | Reelected | 1904 | 1978 | 1919 | Russian | Male |
| Panteleimon Ponomarenko | Пантелеймон Пономаренко | New | Renewed | Reelected | 1902 | 1984 | 1925 | Ukrainian | Male |
| Georgy Popov | Георгий Попов | Candidate | Promoted | Candidate | 1906 | 1968 | 1926 | Russian | Male |
| Alexander Poskrebyshev | Александр Поскрёбышев | Candidate | Renewed | Reelected | 1891 | 1965 | 1917 | Russian | Male |
| Pyotr Pospelov | Пётр Поспелов | New | Renewed | Reelected | 1898 | 1979 | 1916 | Russian | Male |
| Vladimir Potemkin | Владимир Потёмкин | New | Renewed | Not | 1898 | 1979 | 1919 | Russian | Male |
| Vasily Pronin | Василий Пронин | Candidate | Promoted | Reelected | 1905 | 1993 | 1925 | Russian | Male |
| Ivan Rogov | Иван Рогов | New | Renewed | Not | 1898 | 1979 | 1918 | Russian | Male |
| Ivan Sedin | Иван Седин | New | Renewed | Not | 1906 | 1972 | 1928 | Russian | Male |
| Aleksey Shakurin | Алексей Шахурин | New | Renewed | Sentenced | 1904 | 1975 | 1925 | Russian | Male |
| Efim Shchadenko | Ефим Щаденко | New | Candidate | — | 1900 | 1951 | 1904 | Ukrainian | Male |
| Aleksandr Shcherbakov | Александр Щербаков | New | Renewed | Died | 1901 | 1945 | 1918 | Russian | Male |
| Matvei Shkiryatov | Матвей Шкирятов | New | Renewed | Reelected | 1883 | 1954 | 1906 | Russian | Male |
| Grigori Shtern | Григорий Штерн | New | Renewed | Sentenced | 1900 | 1941 | 1919 | Jewish | Male |
| Nikolai Shvernik | Николай Шверник | Old | Renewed | Reelected | 1888 | 1970 | 1905 | Russian | Male |
| Nikolay Skvortsov | Николай Скворцов | New | Renewed | Not | 1899 | 1974 | 1919 | Russian | Male |
| Joseph Stalin | Иосиф Сталин | Old | Renewed | Reelected | 1878 | 1953 | 1898 | Georgian | Male |
| Mikhail Suslov | Михаил Суслов | Not | Elected | Reelected | 1902 | 1982 | 1921 | Russian | Male |
| Ivan Tevosian | Иван Тевосян | New | Renewed | Reelected | 1902 | 1958 | 1918 | Armenian | Male |
| Semyon Timoshenko | Семён Тимошенко | New | Renewed | Candidate | 1895 | 1970 | 1919 | Ukrainian | Male |
| Yusupov Usman | Усман Юсупов | New | Renewed | Reelected | 1901 | 1966 | 1926 | Uzbek | Male |
| Vasily Vakhrushev | Василий Вахрушев | New | Renewed | Died | 1902 | 1947 | 1919 | Russian | Male |
| Boris Vannikov | Борис Ванников | New | Renewed | Reelected | 1897 | 1962 | 1919 | Russian | Male |
| Kliment Voroshilov | Климент Ворошилов | Old | Renewed | Reelected | 1881 | 1969 | 1903 | Russian | Male |
| Nikolai Voznesensky | Николай Вознесенский | New | Renewed | Sentenced | 1903 | 1950 | 1919 | Russian | Male |
| Andrey Vyshinsky | Андрей Вышинский | New | Renewed | Reelected | 1883 | 1954 | 1920 | Russian | Male |
| Yemelyan Yaroslavsky | Емельян Ярославский | New | Renewed | Died | 1878 | 1943 | 1898 | Russian | Male |
| Aleksandr Yefremov | Александр Ефремов | New | Renewed | Died | 1904 | 1951 | 1924 | Russian | Male |
| Semyon Zadionchenko | Семён Задионченко | New | Renewed | Not | 1898 | 1972 | 1919 | Ukrainian | Male |
| Rosalia Zemlyachka | Розалия Землячка | New | Renewed | Died | 1876 | 1947 | 1898 | Jewish | Female |
| Simon Zhakarov | Семён Захаров | New | Renewed | Not | 1906 | 1986 | 1926 | Russian | Male |
| Andrei Zhdanov | Андрей Жданов | Old | Renewed | Died | 1896 | 1948 | 1915 | Russian | Male |
| Arseny Zverev | Арсений Зверев | New | Renewed | Reelected | 1900 | 1969 | 1919 | Russian | Male |

=== Candidates ===
Candidate Members of the Central Committee of the 18th Congress of the All-Union Communist Party (Bolsheviks)
| Name | Cyrillic | 17th CC | 18th Con. | 19th CC | Birth | Death | PM | Ethnicity | Gender |
|---|---|---|---|---|---|---|---|---|---|
| Georgy Aleksandrov | Георгий Александров | Not | Candidate | Candidate | 1908 | 1961 | 1928 | Russian | Male |
| Alexander Alemasov | Александр Алемасов | New | Renewed | Not | 1902 | 1972 | 1919 | Russian | Male |
| Dmitry Antonov | Дмитрий Антонов | New | Removed | Not | 1896 | ? | 1918 | Russian | Male |
| Iosif Apanasenko | Иосиф Апанасенко | Not | Candidate | WWII | 1890 | 1943 | 1918 | Russian | Male |
| Grigory Arutinov | Григроий Арутинов | New | Renewed | Member | 1900 | 1957 | 1919 | Armenian | Male |
| Sergei Bagaev | Сергей Багаев | New | Renewed | Not | 1902 | 1977 | 1920 | Russian | Male |
| Valerian Bakradze | Валериан Бакрадзе | New | Renewed | Candidate | 1901 | 1971 | 1921 | Georgian | Male |
| Ivan Benediktov | Иван Бенедиктов | — | Candidate | Member | 1902 | 1983 | 1930 | Russian | Male |
| Nikolai Biryukov | Николай Бирюков | New | Removed | Not | 1901 | 1974 | 1925 | Russian | Male |
| Ivan Boytsov | Иван Бойцов | New | Renewed | Member | 1896 | 1988 | 1919 | Russian | Male |
| Candide Charkviani | Кандид Чарквиани | New | Renewed | Not | 1907 | 1994 | 1930 | Georgian | Male |
| Yakov Cherevichenko | Яков Черевиченко | Not | Candidate | Not | 1894 | 1976 | 1919 | Russian | Male |
| Boris Chernousov | Борис Черноусов | New | Renewed | Not | 1908 | 1978 | 1929 | Russian | Male |
| Aleksey Chuyanov | Алексей Чуянов | New | Renewed | Not | 1905 | 1977 | 1925 | Russian | Male |
| Vladimir Dekanozov | Владимир Деканозов | New | Promoted | — | 1898 | 1953 | 1920 | Georgian | Male |
| Mikhail Denisov | Михаил Денисов | New | Renewed | Not | 1902 | 1973 | 1926 | Russian | Male |
| Pavel Doronin | Павел Доронин | New | Renewed | Not | 1909 | 1976 | 1927 | Russian | Male |
| Alexander Dubrovsky | Александр Дубровский | New | Renewed | Removed | 1900 | 1970 | 1920 | Russian | Male |
| Nikolay Feklenko | Николай Фекленко | New | Removed | Died | 1901 | 1951 | 1920 | Russian | Male |
| Aleksey Frolkov | Алексей Фролков | New | Removed | Not | 1904 | 1989 | 1926 | Russian | Male |
| Sergo Goglidze | Сергей Гоглидзе | New | Renewed | Candidate | 1901 | 1953 | 1919 | Georgian | Male |
| Aleksandr Gorkin | Александр Горкин | New | Renewed | Not | 1897 | 1988 | 1916 | Russian | Male |
| Grigory Gromov | Григорий Громов | New | Renewed | Not | 1903 | 1973 | 1924 | Russian | Male |
| Nikolai Gusarov | Николай Гусаров | New | Renewed | Not | 1905 | 1985 | 1925 | Russian | Male |
| Mikhail Gvishiani | Михаил Гвишиани | New | Renewed | Not | 1905 | 1966 | 1928 | Georgian | Male |
| Sergei Ignatiev | Сергей Игнатьев | New | Renewed | Not | 1902 | 1984 | 1924 | Russian | Male |
| Nikolai Ignatov | Николай Игнатов | New | Removed | Member | 1901 | 1966 | 1924 | Russian | Male |
| Avak Iskanderov | Авак Искандеров | New | Renewed | Sentenced | 1902 | 1941 | 1920 | Russian | Male |
| Kirill Kachalin | КириллКачалин | New | Renewed | Removed | 1904 | ? | 1928 | Russian | Male |
| Sergey Kaftanov | Сергей Кафтанов | New | Renewed | Not | 1905 | 1978 | 1926 | Russian | Male |
| Jānis Kalnbērziņš | Ян Калнбе́рзинь | Not | Candidate | Member | 1893 | 1986 | 1917 | Latvian | Male |
| Konstantin Kartashov | Константин Карташёв | New | Renewed | Not | 1904 | 1959 | 1927 | Russian | Male |
| Mikhail Kirponos | Иосиф Апанасенко | Not | Candidate | WWII | 1890 | 1941 | 1918 | Russian | Male |
| Ivan Konev | Иван Конев | New | Renewed | Member | 1897 | 1973 | 1918 | Russian | Male |
| Ivan Khokhlov | Иван Хохлов | New | Renewed | Candidate | 1895 | 1973 | 1918 | Russian | Male |
| Bogdan Kobulov | Богдан Кобулов | New | Renewed | Candidate | 1904 | 1953 | 1925 | Armenian | Male |
| Anatoly Kolybanov | Анатолий Колыбанов | New | Renewed | Not | 1904 | 1978 | 1925 | Russian | Male |
| Pavel Komarov | Павел Комаров | New | Renewed | Candidate | 1898 | 1983 | 1920 | Russian | Male |
| Mikhail Kovalyov | Михаил Ковалёв | New | Removed | Not | 1897 | 1967 | 1927 | Russian | Male |
| Sergey Kruglov | Сергей Круглов | New | Renewed | Member | 1907 | 1977 | 1928 | Russian | Male |
| Alexey Krutikov | Алексей Крутиков | Not | Candidate | Not | 1902 | 1962 | 1927 | Russian | Male |
| Pavel Kulakov | Павел Кулаков | New | Renewed | Not | 1910 | 1979 | 1929 | Russian | Male |
| Gennady Kupriyanov | Геннадий Куприянов | Not | Candidate | Sentenced | 1905 | 1979 | 1926 | Russian | Male |
| Aleksandr Loktionov | Александр Локтионов | New | Renewed | Sentenced | 1893 | 1941 | 1921 | Russian | Male |
| Ivan Maisky | Антанас Снечкус | Not | Candidate | Removed | 1884 | 1975 | 1921 | Russian | Male |
| Ivan Makarov | Иван Макаров | — | Renewed | Died | 1888 | 1949 | 1905 | Russian | Male |
| Ivan Maslennikov | Иван Масленников | New | Renewed | Candidate | 1900 | 1954 | 1924 | Russian | Male |
| Kirill Meretskov | Кирилл Мерецков | New | Renewed | Candidate | 1897 | 1968 | 1917 | Russian | Male |
| Nikolay Nevezhin | Николай Невежин | New | Removed | Not | 1901 | 1972 | 1925 | Russian | Male |
| Ivan Nikishov | Иван Никишов | New | Renewed | Not | 1894 | 1956 | 1919 | Russian | Male |
| Ivan Nosenko | Иван Носенко | Not | Candidate | Candidate | 1902 | 1956 | 1925 | Russian | Male |
| Georgy Paltsev | Георгий Пальцев | New | Renewed | Removed | 1906 | 1964 | 1927 | Russian | Male |
| Nikolai Patolichev | Николай Патоличев | New | Promoted | — | 1908 | 1989 | 1928 | Russian | Male |
| Dmitry Pavlov | Дмитрий Павлов | New | Renewed | Sentenced | 1897 | 1941 | 1919 | Russian | Male |
| Pyotr Popkov | Пётр Попков | New | Renewed | Sentenced | 1903 | 1950 | 1925 | Russian | Male |
| Georgy Popov | Георгий Попов | New | Promoted | — | 1906 | 1968 | 1926 | Russian | Male |
| Vasily Pronin | Василий Пронин | New | Promoted | — | 1905 | 1993 | 1925 | Russian | Male |
| Grigory Rastogin | Григорий Растёгин | New | Removed | Not | 1902 | 1971 | 1926 | Russian | Male |
| Mikhail Rodionov | Григорий Растёгин | Not | Candidate | Sentenced | 1907 | 1950 | 1929 | Russian | Male |
| Aleksandr Samokhvalov | Александр Самохвалов | New | Removed | Not | 1902 | 1956 | 1920 | Russian | Male |
| Karl Säre | Карл Сяре | Not | Candidate | WWII | 1903 | 1956 | 1927 | Estonian | Male |
| Georgy Savchenko | Георгий Савченко | New | Renewed | Sentenced | 1901 | 1941 | 1925 | Russian | Male |
| Pyotr Seleznev | Пётр Селезнёв | New | Renewed | Died | 1897 | 1949 | 1915 | Russian | Male |
| Zinovie Serdiuk | Зиновий Сердюк | New | Renewed | Candidate | 1903 | 1982 | 1925 | Russian | Male |
| Ivan Sergeyev | Иван Сергеев | New | Renewed | Sentenced | 1897 | 1942 | 1932 | Russian | Male |
| Ivan Serov | Иван Серов | Not | Candidate | Candidate | 1905 | 1990 | 1926 | Russian | Male |
| Fazyl Shagimardanov | Фазыл Шагимарданов | New | Removed | Not | 1906 | 1968 | 1927 | Russian | Male |
| Boris Shaposhnikov | Борис Шапошников | New | Renewed | Died | 1882 | 1945 | 1930 | Russian | Male |
| Efim Shchadenko | Ефим Щаденко | — | Candidate | Died | 1900 | 1951 | 1904 | Ukrainian | Male |
| Terenty Shtykov | Терентий Штыков | New | Renewed | Not | 1907 | 1964 | 1929 | Belarusian | Male |
| Yakov Smushkevich | Яков Смушкевич | New | Renewed | Sentenced | 1902 | 1941 | 1918 | Jewish | Male |
| Antanas Sniečkus | Антанас Снечкус | Not | Candidate | Member | 1902 | 1974 | 1920 | Lithuanian | Male |
| Leonid Sosnin | Леонид Соснин | New | Renewed | Not | 1895 | 1973 | 1917 | Russian | Male |
| Vasily Starchenko | Василий Старченко | New | Renewed | Died | 1904 | 1948 | 1928 | Ukrainian | Male |
| Maxim Starostin | Максим Старостин | New | Renewed | Died | 1902 | 1948 | 1922 | Russian | Male |
| Yakov Storozhev | Яков Сторожев | New | Renewed | Not | 1911 | 1988 | 1930 | Russian | Male |
| Ivan Tyulenev | Ива́н Тюле́нев | Not | Candidate | Not | 1892 | 1978 | 1918 | Russian | Male |
| Gavrii Veynberg | Гавриил Вейнберг | Candidate | Removed | Died | 1891 | 1946 | 1906 | Polish | Male |
| Ivan Vlasov | Иван Власов | New | Renewed | Not | 1903 | 1969 | 1929 | Russian | Male |
| Viktor Yartsev | Виктор Ярцев | New | Recalled | Sentenced | 1904 | 1940 | 1920 | Russian | Male |
| Ivan Yumashev | Ива́н Тюле́нев | Not | Candidate | Candidate | 1895 | 1972 | 1918 | Russian | Male |
| Aleksandr Zaporozhets | Александр Запорожец | Not | Candidate | Removed | 1899 | 1959 | 1919 | Russian | Male |
| Vasily Zhavoronkov | Василий Жаворонков | New | Renewed | Candidate | 1906 | 1987 | 1929 | Russian | Male |
| Polina Zhemchuzhina | Полина Жемчужина | New | Renewed | Not | 1897 | 1970 | 1918 | Jewish | Female |
| Georgy Zhukov | Георгий Жуков | Not | Candidate | Removed | 1896 | 1974 | 1919 | Russian | Male |
| Viktor Zhuravlev | Виктор Журавлёв | New | Removed | Died | 1902 | 1946 | 1920 | Russian | Male |
| Vasily Zotov | Василий Зотов | New | Renewed | Not | 1899 | 1977 | 1925 | Russian | Male |
