= Leningrad Regional Committee of the Communist Party of the Soviet Union =

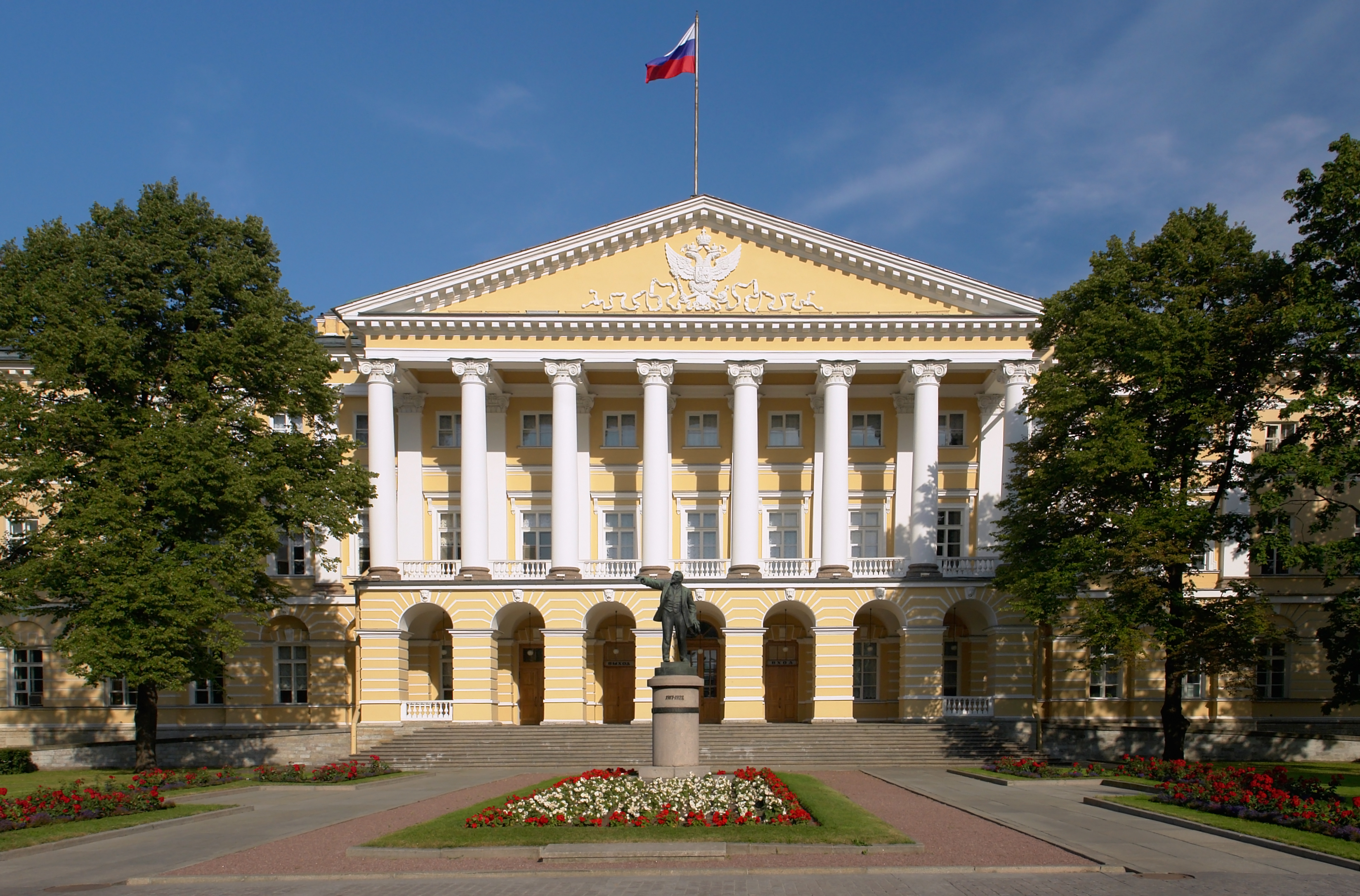

The Leningrad Regional Committee of the Communist Party of the Soviet Union, commonly referred to as the Leningrad CPSU obkom, was the position of highest authority in Leningrad Oblast during most of the existence of the Soviet Union. The position was created on 1 August 1927, and abolished on 29 August 1991 although most authority was lost in June that year to the position of Governor of Leningrad Oblast. The First Secretary was a de facto appointed position usually by the Politburo or the General Secretary himself.

== First Secretaries ==
The following individuals served as first secretaries of the Leningrad Regional Committee of the Communist Party of the Soviet Union.

Name	Term of office		Life years
Name	Start	End	Life years
Sergey Kirov	1 August 1927	1 December 1934	1886–1934
Andrei Zhdanov	15 December 1934	17 January 1945	1896–1948
Alexey Kuznetsov	17 January 1945	26 March 1946	1905–1950
Pyotr Popkov	26 March 1946	22 February 1949	1903–1950
Vasily Andrianov	22 February 1949	25 November 1953	1902–1978
Frol Kozlov	25 November 1953	24 December 1957	1908–1965
Ivan Spiridonov	24 December 1957	3 May 1962	1905–1991
Vasily Tolstikov	3 May 1962	16 September 1970	1917–2003
Grigory Romanov	16 September 1970	21 June 1983	1923–2008
Lev Zaykov	21 June 1983	8 July 1985	1923–2002
Yuri Solovyev	8 July 1985	12 July 1989	1925–2011
Boris Gidaspov	12 July 1989	29 August 1991	1933–2007

== Second Secretary ==
Name	Term of Office		Life years
Name	Start	End	Life years
Terentii Shtykov	16 June 1938	1 January 1945	1907–1964
Vasily Rykov	1952	1961	1918–2011

== See also ==
- Leningrad City Committee of the Communist Party of the Soviet Union

== Sources ==
- World Statesmen.org
