= Pyotr Popkov =

Soviet politician (1903–1950)

- Пётр Попков

First Secretary of the Leningrad Regional and City Party Committee
- In office 26 March 1946 – 15 February 1949
- Preceded by: Alexey Kuznetsov
- Succeeded by: Vasily Andrianov

Chairman of the Leningrad City Soviet
- In office 2 February 1939 – 5 July 1946
- Preceded by: Alexei Kosygin
- Succeeded by: Pyotr Lazutin

Personal details
- Party: CPSU
- Education: Leningrad Institute of Municipal Construction and Engineering
- Awards: Order of Lenin, Order of the Patriotic War, Medal "For the Defence of Leningrad"

Pyotr Sergeevich Popkov (Russian: Пётр Сергеевич Попков; January 23 (January 10), 1903, Kaliteyevo, Vladimirsky Uyezd, Vladimir Governorate, Russian Empire - October 1, 1950, Leningrad, RSFSR) was a Soviet politician who served as the Leningrad First Secretary of the Leningrad regional and city committees of the Communist Party of the Soviet Union from 1946 to 1949.

== Biography ==
He was born into a working-class family. His father, Sergei Sergeevich Popkov, was a carpenter. His mother, Maria Petrovna Guseva, was a housewife. The Popkov family consisted of nine people.

In 1910, he entered the parish school in his native village, but in May 1912 he was sent to work as a farm laborer (as a shepherd for public livestock). He worked as a farm laborer for about four years in different villages of the Vladimir province.

In November 1915, at the request of his father, he moved permanently to the city of Vladimir, where he began working in a private bakery. In 1917, the "Union of Carpenters" was organized in Vladimir, and he began working there as an apprentice in carpentry. From May 1918, he transferred to serve in the provincial communications department, and from the end of 1920 to 1925, he worked as a carpenter at the Krasny Stroitel plant.

From 1925 he served as Secretary of the Vladimir volost committee of the Komsomol.

In 1925 he joined the Communist Party of the Soviet Union. In 1937, he graduated from the Leningrad Institute of Municipal Construction Engineers.

From 1926 to 1928 he served as head of the carpentry workshop of the Vladimir city department of public utilities. In 1937 as head of the research sector and secretary of the party committee of the Leningrad Institute of Public Utilities Engineers. In 1937-1938 he served as chairman of the executive committee of the Leninsky District Council in Leningrad. In 1938-1939 he served as first deputy chairman of the Leningrad City Council and in 1939-1940 as chairman of the Leningrad City Council. From 1940 to 1946 he served as chairman of the executive committee of the Leningrad City Council.

In 1941, during the Great Patriotic War, he served as member of the Commission on Leningrad Defense. From April 1942 — member of the Military Council of the Leningrad Air Defense Army.

He was one of the organizers and leaders of the defense of Leningrad during the Great Patriotic War of 1941-1945. During this period, all spheres of city life were reorganized due to the outbreak of the Great Patriotic War and the siege. The city's industry was converted to defense needs. Hospitals for patients with malnutrition were created. Sanitary cleaning of the city was organized. A cable was laid along the bottom of Lake Ladoga to supply electricity from the Volkhov Hydroelectric Station.

On January 13, 1944, together with Alexei Bubnov, he signed a resolution of the Leningrad City Executive Committee on returning 20 squares and streets of Leningrad to their historical pre-revolutionary names (including Palace Square, Nevsky Prospect, and Sadovaya Street).

Following the end of the war, he was involved in restoration and reconstruction efforts of the city. The rationing system for food distribution was abolished. The Leningrad Coke and Gas Plant resumed operations and the city's heat supply was organized. Large gas-holder stations were put into operation.

From 1946 to 1949 he served as First Secretary of the Leningrad Regional and City Party Committee.

From 1939 to 1946 he was a candidate (non-voting) member of the Central Committee of the Communist Party of the Soviet Union. From 1946 he served as Deputy of the Supreme Soviet of the Soviet Union of the 2nd convocation, member of the Presidium of the Supreme Soviet of the Soviet Union (1946-1949). He was elected as a deputy of the Supreme Soviet of the RSFSR of the 1st and 2nd convocations.

On February 15, 1949, he was removed from his post and given a severe reprimand. In March 1949, he was sent to graduate school at the Institute of Social Sciences under the Central Committee of the Communist Party of the Soviet Union.

On August 13, 1949, he was arrested in the office of Georgy Malenkov; he was one of the main figures in the Leningrad affair, the post-war purges in the party apparatus.

On October 1, 1950 he was shot.

On April 30, 1954, the Military Collegium of the Supreme Court of the Soviet Union overturned the sentence as falsified, and Popkov was fully rehabilitated (posthumously). In party terms, by decision of the CPC under the Central Committee of the CPSU, he was rehabilitated on September 18, 1987.
