= Orgburo of the 18th Congress of the All-Union Communist Party (Bolsheviks) =

Organisational Bureau of Soviet Union 18th Congress

The 18th Orgburo of the All-Union Communist Party (Bolsheviks) was elected by the 1st plenary session of the 18th Central Committee, in the immediate aftermath of the 18th Congress. It was the last Orgburo, as its functions were transferred to an enlarged Secretariat at the 19th Congress before the Orgburo itself was abolished.

== Full members ==
Name (birth–death)	Took office	Left office	Duration	Note
Andrey Andreyev (1895–1971)	22 March 1939	18 March 1946	6 years, 361 days	Relieved of his duties by the 4th plenary session.
Andrei Zhdanov (1896–1948)	22 March 1939	31 August 1948	9 years, 223 days	Died in office.
Lazar Kaganovich (1893–1991)	22 March 1939	18 March 1946	6 years, 361 days	Relieved of his duties by the 4th plenary session.
Georgy Malenkov (1902–1988)	22 March 1939	16 October 1952	13 years, 208 days	—
Lev Mekhlis (1889–1953)	22 March 1939	16 October 1952	13 years, 208 days	—
Nikolai Mikhailov (1906–1982)	22 March 1939	16 October 1952	13 years, 208 days	—
Joseph Stalin (1878–1953)	22 March 1939	16 October 1952	13 years, 208 days	—
Nikolai Shvernik (1888–1970)	22 March 1939	18 March 1946	6 years, 361 days	Relieved of his duties by the 4th plenary session.
Alexander Shcherbakov (1901–1945)	22 March 1939	10 May 1945	6 years, 197 days	Died in office.
Georgy Aleksandrov (1908–1961)	18 March 1946	16 October 1952	6 years, 212 days	—
Vasily Andrianov (1902–1978)	18 March 1946	16 October 1952	6 years, 212 days	—
Nikolai Bulganin (1895–1975)	18 March 1946	16 October 1952	6 years, 212 days	—
Alexey Kuznetsov (1905–1950)	18 March 1946	7 March 1949	2 years, 354 days	Relieved of his duties by questionnaire.
Vasily Kuznetsov (1901–1990)	18 March 1946	16 October 1952	6 years, 212 days	—
Nikolai Patolichev (1908–1989)	18 March 1946	24 May 1947	1 year, 67 days	—
Georgy Popov (1906–1968)	18 March 1946	16 October 1952	6 years, 212 days	—
Mikhail Rodionov (1907–1950)	18 March 1946	7 March 1949	2 years, 354 days	Relieved of his duties by questionnaire.
Mikhail Suslov (1902–1982)	18 March 1946	16 October 1952	6 years, 212 days	—
Nikolai Shatalin (1904–1984)	18 March 1946	16 October 1952	6 years, 212 days	—
Boris Chernousov (1908–1978)	10 March 1949	16 October 1952	3 years, 220 days	Appointed by questionnaire.
