= Ivan Spiridonov =

Soviet statesman and party leader (1905–1991)

- Иван Спиридонов

Chairman of the Council of the Union of the Supreme Soviet of the Soviet Union
- In office April 23, 1962 – June 14, 1970
- Preceded by: Pavel Lobanov
- Succeeded by: Alexey Shitikov

8th First Secretary of the Leningrad Regional Committee of the Communist Party of the Soviet Union
- In office December 24, 1957 – May 3, 1962
- Preceded by: Frol Kozlov
- Succeeded by: Vasily Tolstikov

12th First Secretary of the Leningrad City Committee of the Communist Party of the Soviet Union
- In office July 1956 – December 24, 1957
- Preceded by: Ivan Zamchevsky
- Succeeded by: Nikolay Rodionov

Personal details
- Born: Ivan Vasilyevich Spiridonov; 23 October 1905 Lukoyanovsky Uyezd, Nizhny Novgorod Governorate, Russian Empire
- Died: 7 July 1991 (aged 85) Moscow, Russian SFSR, Soviet Union
- Resting place: Troyekurovskoye Cemetery
- Party: CPSU (since 1928)
- Education: Leningrad Correspondence Industrial Institute
- Profession: Engineer
- Awards: Orders: Order of Lenin; Order of the October Revolution; Order of the Patriotic War; Order of the Red Banner of Labour; Order of Friendship of Peoples; Order of the Badge of Honour; Medals: Medal "For Labour Valour"

Ivan Vasilyevich Spiridonov (Russian: Иван Васильевич Спиридонов; 23 October 1905 – 7 July 1991) was a Soviet statesman and party leader. In 1954–1962, he was the First Secretary of the Leningrad City Committee, then the Regional Committee of the Communist Party of the Soviet Union. In 1959–1962 – Member of the Bureau of the Central Committee of the Communist Party of the Soviet Union for the Russian Soviet Federative Socialist Republic. In 1962–1970 – Chairman of the Council of the Union of the Supreme Soviet of the Soviet Union.

== Early life and engineering career ==
He was born into a peasant family. Since 1925 – a mechanic, head of the technical control department of the shop. In 1939, he graduated from the Leningrad Correspondence Industrial Institute. Since 1939, in engineering and technical positions, director of the Oryol Textile Machinery Plant. In 1941, the plant was evacuated to Kuznetsk, Penza Region, was transformed into the Kuznetsk Textile Engineering Plant and redesigned to produce products for the Special Forces Missile Forces. In 1944–1950, he was the director of the Leningrad Gosmetr Plant.

== Political career ==
In 1950–1952, he was Secretary of the Moscow District Committee of the All–Union Communist Party (Bolsheviks) of the city of Leningrad.

In 1952, Spiridonov became Deputy Chairman of the Leningrad Regional Executive Committee, and in 1954, he took over as Secretary of the Leningrad Regional Committee of the Communist Party of the Soviet Union. In July 1956 – December 1957 – 1st Secretary of the Leningrad City Committee of the Communist Party of the Soviet Union.

First Secretary of the Leningrad Regional Committee of the Communist Party of the Soviet Union from December 24, 1957, to May 3, 1962. Having taken the chair of the First Secretary of the Regional Committee after the departure of Frol Kozlov, Spiridonov directed most of his efforts to housing construction. Under him, new standard designs of not very comfortable, but cheap houses ("Khrushchevkas") were developed, large construction trusts appeared, which switched to the method of complex development of entire residential areas. In the same period, through traffic was opened along the Moscow–Leningrad Highway. The scientific and technical base of Leningrad developed at a rapid pace. The construction of scientific campuses began in the districts of Pesochny, Krasnoye Selo, Gatchina, Kirovsk and others. The development of fundamental scientific research contributed to the flourishing of the defense industry, whose enterprises began to determine the entire structure of the local industry and directly influence the rate of economic development of the region.

In 1961, at the 22nd Congress of the Communist Party of the Soviet Union, as the head of the Leningrad delegation, he proposed the removal of body of Stalin from the Mausoleum.

Member of the Central Committee of the Communist Party of the Soviet Union (1961–1971). Member of the Bureau of the Central Committee of the Communist Party of the Soviet Union for the Russian Soviet Federative Socialist Republic (1959 – November 23, 1962). Deputy of the Supreme Soviet of the Soviet Union of the 5th–8th convocations.

Secretary of the Central Committee of the Communist Party of the Soviet Union from October 31, 1961, to April 23, 1962.

From April 23, 1962, to June 14, 1970 – Chairman of the Council of the Union of the Supreme Soviet of the Soviet Union.

== Retirement and death ==
He retired in July 1970. He died on July 7, 1991, in Moscow. He was buried at the Troyekurovskoye Cemetery.

Chairman of the Council of Ministers of the Soviet Union Nikita Khrushchev (foreground right) and First Secretary of the Leningrad Regional Committee of the Communist Party of the Soviet Union Ivan Spiridonov (foreground left) congratulate the newlyweds Kirillovs at the Wedding Palace on the Red Fleet Embankment, 28

== Sources ==
- Central Committee of the Communist Party of the Soviet Union, All–Union Communist Party (Bolsheviks), Russian Communist Party (Bolsheviks), Russian Social Democratic Labor Party (Bolsheviks): Historical and Biographical Reference. Compiled by Yuri Goryachev. Moscow: Publishing House "Parade". 2005. ISBN 5-8061-0062-6.
- Biography of Ivan Spiridonov on the Russian Biography Website
