= 18th Central Committee =

18th Central Committee may refer to:

- Central Committee of the 18th Congress of the All-Union Communist Party (Bolsheviks), 1939–1952
- 18th Central Committee of the Chinese Communist Party, 2012–2017
- 18th Central Committee of the Communist Party of Czechoslovakia
