= Secretariat of the 18th Congress of the All-Union Communist Party (Bolsheviks) =

The 18th Secretariat of the Communist Party of the Soviet Union was elected by the 18th Central Committee following the 18th Congress, of the Communist Party, held in March 1939. The Congress took place during a critical period of pre-World War II tensions, with the Soviet leadership consolidating its control under General Secretary Joseph Stalin. Delegates at the Congress discussed economic policies, including the ongoing implementation of five-year plans, and affirmed the party's priorities in the face of growing international uncertainty. The Secretariat, as a key administrative body, played an instrumental role in overseeing the implementation of party directives during this time.

== List of members ==
Name (birth–death)	Took office	Left office	Duration	Note
Joseph Stalin (1878–1953)	22 April 1939	14 October 1952	13 years, 175 days	—
Andrey Andreyev (1895–1971)	22 April 1939	18 March 1946	6 years, 330 days	—
Alexey Kuznetsov (1905–1950)	18 March 1946	28 January 1949	9 years, 281 days	The official explanation for his removal was that he was being "reassigned".
Andrei Zhdanov (1896–1948)	22 April 1939	31 August 1947	9 years, 131 days	Died in office of natural causes.
Georgy Malenkov (1902–1988)	22 April 1939	6 May 1946	7 years, 14 days	Removed on Stalin's orders.
Georgy Malenkov (1902–1988)	1 July 1948	14 October 1952	4 years, 105 days	Reelected to the Secretariat at Stalin's proposal.
Nikita Khrushchev (1894–1971)	16 December 1949	14 October 1952	13 years, 175 days	—
Nikolay Patolichev (1908–1989)	5 June 1946	24 May 1947	2 years, 87 days	—
Panteleimon Ponomarenko (1902–1984)	1 July 1948	14 October 1952	4 years, 105 days	—
Georgy Popov (1906–1968)	18 March 1946	16 December 1949	10 years, 238 days	—
Alexander Shcherbakov (1901–1945)	5 May 1941	10 May 1945	6 years, 18 days	Elected to the Secretariat at the 6th Plenary Session, but died of natural causes during his tenure.
Mikhail Suslov (1902–1982)	24 May 1947	14 October 1952	5 years, 112 days	—
