= Vasily Andrianov (politician) =

Soviet politician (1902–1978)

- Василий Андрианов
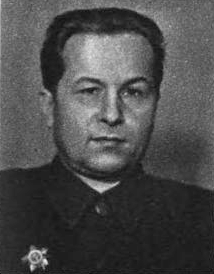
- Andrianov in 1950

First Secretary of the Leningrad Regional Party Committee
- In office 22 February 1949 – 25 November 1953
- Preceded by: Pyotr Popkov
- Succeeded by: Frol Kozlov

First Secretary of the Leningrad City Party Committee
- In office 22 February 1949 – 19 January 1950
- Preceded by: Pyotr Popkov
- Succeeded by: Frol Kozlov

Full member of the 19th Presidium
- In office 16 October 1952 – 6 March 1953

Member of the 18th Orgburo
- In office 18 March 1946 – 5 October 1952

Personal details
- Born: 21 March 1902 Kaluga Province, Russian Empire
- Died: 3 October 1978 (aged 76) Moscow, Russian SFSR Soviet Union
- Resting place: Novodevichy Cemetery
- Party: Communist Party of the Soviet Union
- Profession: Civil servant

Vasily Mikhailovich Andrianov (Russian: Васи́лий Миха́йлович Андриа́нов; 21 March 1902 — 3 October 1978) was a Soviet politician.

He served in the Red Army from 1924 until 1925.

In 1926 he joined the Bolshevik Party.

He eventually rose to be the leader of the Communist Party in the city of Sverdlovsk from 1939 until 1946.

He eventually rose to be the leader of the Communist Party in the city of Leningrad from 1949 until 1953.

He was a member of the Presidium of the CPSU Central Committee from 1952 until 1953.

He was buried at the Novodevichy Cemetery, Moscow.
