= Alexey Shitikov =

Soviet communist party member and statesman (1912–1993)

- Алексей Шитиков

7th First Secretary of the Regional Committee of the All–Union Communist Party (Bolsheviks) – Communist Party of the Soviet Union of the Jewish Autonomous Oblast
- In office August 1952 – 1955
- Preceded by: Pavel Simonov
- Succeeded by: Lev Benkovich

4th Second Secretary of the Khabarovsk Regional Committee of the Communist Party of the Soviet Union
- In office ? – February 22, 1957
- Succeeded by: Alexey Cherny

7th First Secretary of the Khabarovsk Regional Committee of the Communist Party of the Soviet Union
- In office February 22, 1957 – July 23, 1970
- Preceded by: Mikhail Stakhursky
- Succeeded by: Alexey Cherny

8th Chairman of the Council of the Union of the Supreme Soviet of the Soviet Union
- In office July 14, 1970 – April 11, 1984
- Preceded by: Ivan Spiridonov
- Succeeded by: Lev Tolkunov

Personal details
- Born: Alexey Pavlovich Shitikov; March 14, 1912 Gorka village, Kologrivsky Uyezd, Kostroma Governorate, Russian Empire
- Died: August 2, 1993 (aged 81) Moscow, Russia
- Resting place: Kuntsevo Cemetery
- Party: All–Union Communist Party (Bolsheviks) – Communist Party of the Soviet Union (since 1939)
- Education: Nizhny Novgorod Agricultural Institute (1936); Higher Party School under the Central Committee of the All–Union Communist Party (Bolsheviks) (1951)
- Awards: Orders: Order of Lenin; Order of the October Revolution; Order of the Patriotic War; Order of the Red Banner of Labour; Order of Friendship of Peoples; Order of the Red Star; Order of the Badge of Honour; Medals: Medal "For Labour Valour"

Military service
- Battles/wars: Great Patriotic War

Alexey Pavlovich Shitikov (Russian: Алексей Павлович Шитиков; 14 March 1912 – 2 August 1993) was a Soviet communist party member and statesman.

== Biography ==
Shitikov was born in the village of Gorka, Kostroma Governorate.

In 1936, he was livestock specialist of the district land department, first Secretary of the Ardatovsky District Committee of the All–Union Leninist Communist Youth Union (Gorky Region).

- 1941–1945 – in the Workers' and Peasants' Red Army;
- 1945–1948 – in the apparatus of the Khabarovsk Regional Committee of the All–Union Communist Party (Bolsheviks);
- 1948–1950 – Secretary of the Kamchatka Regional Committee of the All–Union Communist Party (Bolsheviks);
- 1950–1952 – in the apparatus of the Khabarovsk Regional Committee of the All–Union Communist Party (Bolsheviks);
- 1952–1955 – First Secretary of the Regional Committee of the All–Union Communist Party (Bolsheviks) – Communist Party of the Soviet Union of the Jewish Autonomous Oblast;
- 1955 – Secretary of the Khabarovsk Regional Committee of the Communist Party of the Soviet Union;
- ?–1957 – Second Secretary of the Khabarovsk Regional Committee of the Communist Party of the Soviet Union;
- 1957–1970 – First Secretary of the Khabarovsk Regional Committee of the Communist Party of the Soviet Union;
- 1970–1984 – Chairman of the Council of the Union of the Supreme Soviet of the Soviet Union.

From 1970, he was Chairman of the Parliamentary Group of the Soviet Union, and from 1971, Chairman of the Soviet Committee for European Security and Cooperation.

In 1984 – retired.

In 1984–1991 – Chairman of the Presidium of the Soviet Society for Cultural Relations with Compatriots Abroad.

Member of the Central Committee of the Communist Party of the Soviet Union (1961–1986). Deputy of the Supreme Soviet of the Soviet Union of the 4th–11th convocations. He was buried in Moscow at the Kuntsevo Cemetery.

== Awards ==
- Three Orders of Lenin;
- Order of the October Revolution;
- Order of the Red Banner of Labour
- Order of Friendship of Peoples
- Order of the Red Star
- Order of the Badge of Honour

== Sources ==
- Biography in the Handbook of the History of the Communist Party and the Soviet Union
- Shitikov Alexey Pavlovich – article from the Great Soviet Encyclopedia
- Konstantin Pronyakin. A Quarter of a Century in the Region. First Secretary of the Khabarovsk Regional Committee of the Communist Party of the Soviet Union Alexei Shitikov Turns 110 // Priamurskiye Vedomosti, No. 9, March 9, 2022, Page 15
