= Leningrad affair =

Series of criminal cases in the Soviet Union

The Leningrad affair, or Leningrad case (Russian: Ленинградское дело, tr. Leningradskoye delo), was a series of criminal cases fabricated in the late 1940s and early 1950s by Joseph Stalin in order to accuse a number of prominent Leningrad-based authority figures and members of the All-Union Communist Party (Bolsheviks) of treason. They were accused of attempting to create an anti-Soviet, Russian nationalist organization based in the city. This happened in the aftermath of the Siege of Leningrad in World War II. Following Soviet victory, the mayor, his deputies and others who kept Nazi German forces out of the city were venerated as heroes across the Soviet Union.

== Preamble ==
Moscow and Leningrad were two competing power centers in the Soviet Union. Researchers argue that the motivation behind the cases was Joseph Stalin's fear of competition from the younger and popular Leningrad leaders – who had been fêted as heroes following the city's siege. Stalin's desire to keep power was combined with his deep distrust of anyone from Leningrad from the time of Stalin's involvement in the Russian Revolution, Russian Civil War, execution of Grigory Zinoviev and the Right Opposition. In this earlier time, among Stalin's competitors from Leningrad who were also assassinated were two former leaders of the city, Sergei Kirov and Leon Trotsky, whose appointed subordinates continued to work in the city government for years after they left office. During the siege of Leningrad, the city leaders were relatively autonomous from Moscow. Survivors of the siege became national heroes, and leaders of Leningrad again gained much influence in the Soviet central government in Moscow.

== Events ==
In January 1949 Pyotr Popkov, Alexey Kuznetsov and Nikolai Voznesensky organised a Leningrad Trade Fair to boost the post-war economy and support the survivors of the Siege of Leningrad with goods and services from other regions of the Soviet Union. The fair was attacked by official Soviet propaganda, and was falsely portrayed as a scheme to use the federal budget from Moscow for business development in Leningrad, although the budget and economics of such a trade fair were normal and legitimate and approved by State Planning Commission and the government of the Soviet Union. Other accusations included that Kuznetsov, Popkov and others tried to re-establish Leningrad's historic and political importance as a former capital of Russia, thus competing with the Moscow-centered communist government. The initial accuser was Georgy Malenkov, Stalin's first deputy. Then formal accusations were formulated by the Communist Party and signed by Malenkov, Nikita Khrushchev and Lavrentiy Beria. Over two thousand people from the Leningrad city government and regional authorities were arrested. Also arrested were many industrial managers, scientists and university professors. The city and regional authorities in Leningrad were swiftly occupied by pro-Stalin communists transplanted from Moscow. Several important politicians were arrested in Moscow and other cities across the Soviet Union.

As a result of the first prosecution, on 30 September 1950, Nikolai Voznesensky (chairman of Gosplan), Mikhail Rodionov (Chairman of the Russian SFSR Council of Ministers), Alexey Kuznetsov, Pyotr Popkov, Ya. F. Kapustin and P. G. Lazutin were sentenced to death on false accusations of embezzlement of the Soviet State budget for "unapproved business in Leningrad", which was labeled as anti-Soviet treason. Several of those prosecuted were also accused of Russian chauvinism for their desire to create a separate Russian Communist Party.

== Executions ==
The verdict was announced behind closed doors after midnight and the six main defendants, including the mayor of the city, were executed by shooting on 1 October 1950. Stalin's government had reinstated the death penalty in the Soviet Union on 12 January 1950; it had previously been repealed in 1947. It was applied to the accused retroactively. Over 200 Leningrad officials were sentenced to prison terms from 10 to 25 years. Their families were stripped of rights to live and work in any major city, thus limiting their lives to Siberia and other remote regions of the country.

About 2,000 of Leningrad's public figures were removed from their positions and exiled from their city, thus losing their homes and other property. All of them were repressed, together with their relatives. Respected intellectuals, scientists, writers and educators, many of whom were pillars of the city's community, were exiled or imprisoned in the Gulag prison camps. Intellectuals were harshly persecuted for the slightest signs of dissent, such as Nikolai Punin, who was killed in a prison camp for expressing his dislike of Soviet propaganda and "tasteless" Lenin portraits.

The Leningrad affair was organised and supervised by Malenkov and Beria. Executions and purges were done by Viktor Abakumov and the MGB. The graves of the executed leaders of Leningrad were never marked and their exact locations are still unknown.

All of the accused were later rehabilitated during the Khrushchev Thaw, many of them posthumously.

Alexei Kosygin, the future Chairman of the Council of Ministers, and Iosif Shikin, the political director of the Red Army, survived but their political careers were hampered for some time.

== Bibliography ==
- Brandenberger, David (2004). "Stalin, the Leningrad Affair, and the Limits of Postwar Russocentrism". The Russian Review. 63 (2). Wiley: 241–255. ISSN 0036-0341. JSTOR 3664083.
