= Georgy Aleksandrov =

Soviet philosopher and politician (1908–1961)

- Георгий Александров

Minister of Culture of the Soviet Union
- In office 9 March 1954 – 10 March 1955
- Premier: Georgy Malenkov; Nikolai Bulganin
- Preceded by: Panteleimon Ponomarenko
- Succeeded by: Nikolai Mikhailov

Head of the Propaganda and Agitation Department of the Central Committee
- In office 6 September 1940 – 1947
- Preceded by: Andrei Zhdanov
- Succeeded by: Mikhail Suslov

Head of the Institute of Philosophy of the Academy of Sciences
- In office 1947–1954
- Preceded by: Grigory Vasetskii
- Succeeded by: Pyotr Fedoseev

Member of the 18th Orgburo
- In office 18 March 1946 – 16 October 1952

Personal details
- Born: 4 April 1908 Saint Petersburg, Russian Empire
- Died: 21 July 1961 (aged 53) Moscow, Russian SFSR, Soviet Union
- Party: Communist Party of the Soviet Union (1928–1961)
- Education: Moscow State University

Georgy Fedorovich Aleksandrov (Russian: Георгий Фёдорович Александров; 22 March 1908 – 7 July 1961) was a Soviet politician and Marxist philosopher.

== Biography ==
=== Childhood and education ===
Aleksandrov was born in 1908 in Saint Petersburg in a worker's family of Russian ethnicity, but became homeless during the Russian Civil War. In 1924–1930, he studied Communist philosophy in Borisoglebsk and Tambov and then transferred to the Moscow Institute of History and Philosophy. He became a member of the Communist Party in 1928. After graduating in 1932, Aleksandrov remained with the Institute for graduate studies, eventually becoming a professor, a deputy director and the Institute's Scientific Secretary.

=== Communist official ===
In 1938, at the height of the Great Purge, the 30 year old Aleksandrov was made deputy head of the Publishing Department of the Executive Committee of the Comintern. In 1939 he was appointed deputy head of the Soviet Communist Party's Central Committee's Propaganda and Agitation Department and at the same time put in charge of the Central Committee's Moscow-based Higher Party School, which he headed until 1946.

In September 1940 Aleksandrov was made head of the Central Committee's Propaganda and Agitation Department, replacing Andrei Zhdanov who, as a Secretary of the Central Committee, retained overall supervision over Communist propaganda in the USSR. In 1941 Aleksandrov was also made a candidate (non-voting) member of the Central Committee and, on 19 March 1946, a member of its Orgburo. In 1946 he was also elected a member of the Soviet Academy of Sciences.

=== Persecution of Anna Akhmatova ===
In 1946, Aleksandrov played a leading part in the campaign to humiliate and intimidate Anna Akhmatova, who is now recognised as one of the greatest poets of the 20th century. In 1940, when on a rare occasion a book of her poems was prepared for publication, Aleksandrov received an angry instruction from Zhdanov to suppress it. In August 1946, a minor agitprop official complained to Aleksandrov about Akhmatova's poetry. Aleksandrov used it to prepare a memo for Zhdanov, for which he or one of his staff dug up a quote from a critical essay written in 1926, which Zhdanov borrowed to denounce Akhmatova as "half nun, half whore", before having her expelled from the Writers' Union, later in August 1946, thus cutting off her source of income.

The satirist Mikhail Zoshchenko was denounced and expelled from the Writers' Union at the same time as Akhmatova. In a memo to Zhdanov just before his expulsion, Aleksandrov complained that "in Zoshchenko's depiction, Soviet people are very primitive and limited. The author makes our people look dumb."

He also had a minor role in preparing the attack that Zhdanov later launched against the Soviet Union's leading composers. Shortly before he was dismissed form his post in 1947, he compiled a long report complaining about an opera by the minor composer, Vano Muradeli. His report was overlooked until Stalin watched the opera, and walked out in a fury. This was the start of a campaign which widened to an onslaught against the Soviet Union's greatest living composers, including Shostakovich and Prokofiev.

=== 1947 demotion ===
Through most of his career, Aleksandrov was associated with Georgy Malenkov, who was one of Joseph Stalin's closest advisors. The historian Werner Hahn believed that he was 'a key member of the Zhdanov group' in 1946–47, 'but later switched sides and became a Malenkov protege.' His apparent change of allegiance may have been connected to the reception given to Aleksandrov's textbook History of Western European Philosophy (1945), which Stalin privately denounced early in 1947 for overvaluing Georg Wilhelm Friedrich Hegel's contributions and underestimating the contributions made by Russian philosophers. In August 1947, Zhdanov led the first public attack on the book, and Aleksandrov lost his Propaganda and Agitation Department position to Mikhail Suslov and his supporters were purged. Nonetheless, Aleksandrov retained his Orgburo post and was made Director of the Soviet Academy of Sciences Institute of Philosophy. He remained there even after Zhdanov's demotion and subsequent death in 1948 and Malenkov's return to power.

=== After Stalin ===
When Georgy Malenkov became the next Soviet Premier after Joseph Stalin's death in March 1953, he made Aleksandrov his minister of culture on 9 March 1954. After Malenkov lost his position in a power struggle with the Soviet Communist Party leader Nikita Khrushchev in February 1955, Aleksandrov was fired on 10 March 1955. Nikolai Mikhailov succeeded him as minister of culture.

Aleksandrov, whom the Montenegrin communist Milovan Djilas described as "a short, pudgy, bald man whose pallor and corpulence proclaimed that he never set foot outside his office" was once again demoted for being involved in a sexual scandal. After his dismissal, the Soviet press reported on his immorality, though the historian Robert Conquest reckoned: "It seems hard to imagine that such conduct could have gone unnoticed for years, and suddenly come to the horrified attention of the authorities just at the moment when the sinner's faction suffers political defeat."

Aleksandrov was sent to Minsk where he was put in charge of the section of dialectical and historical materialism of the Institute of Philosophy and Law at Belarus Academy of Sciences. He spent the rest of his life working on sociology and its history. He died in Moscow in 1961 at age 53.
