= Leningrad City Committee of the Communist Party of the Soviet Union =

Communist Party

The Leningrad City Committee of the Communist Party of the Soviet Union, commonly referred to as the Leningrad CPSU gorkom, was the position of highest authority in the city of Leningrad (until January 26, 1924, Petrograd) roughly equating to that of mayor. The position was created in March 1918, and abolished on August 24, 1991. The First Secretary was a de facto appointed position usually by the Politburo or the General Secretary himself. Until the abolition of the CPSU monopoly on power on March 14, 1990, he had actual power in Leningrad.

== First Secretaries ==
Name	Term of office		Life years
Name	Start	End	Life years
Pyotr Zaslavsky	March 1918	April 1919	1890–1967
Moisey Kharitonov	April 1919	November 1919	1887–1948
Sergey Zorin	November 1919	February 1921	1891–1937
Nikolay Uglanov	February 21, 1921	December 14, 1921	1886–1937
Ivan Smirnov	December 15, 1921	March 1922	1881–1936
Pyotr Zalutsky	March 1922	December 1925	1888–1937
Grigory Evdokimov	December 1925	January 7, 1926	1884–1936
Sergei Kirov	January 8, 1926	December 1, 1934	1886–1934
Andrei Zhdanov	December 15, 1934	January 17, 1945	1896–1948
Alexey Kuznetsov	January 17, 1945	March 8, 1946	1905–1950
Pyotr Popkov	March 9, 1946	February 15, 1949	1903–1950
Vasily Andrianov	February 22, 1949	January 19, 1950	1902–1978
Frol Kozlov	January 19, 1950	July 8, 1952	1908–1965
Aleksey Alekseyev	July 8, 1952	April 1, 1953	1911–?
Nikolay Ignatov	April 1, 1953	November 25, 1953	1901–1966
Ivan Zamchevsky	November 25, 1953	July 27, 1956	1909–1979
Ivan Spiridonov	July 27, 1956	December 24, 1957	1905–1991
Nikolay Rodionov	December 24, 1957	January 8, 1960	1915–1999
Georgy Popov	January 9, 1960	February 12, 1971	1912–1968
Boris Aristov	February 13, 1971	April 19, 1978	1925–2018
Yury Solovyov	April 19, 1978	March 12, 1984	1925–2011
Anatoly Dumachev	March 12, 1984	January 17, 1986	1932–2004
Anatoly Gerasimov	January 17, 1986	November 21, 1989	1931–
Boris Gidaspov	November 21, 1989	August 24, 1991	1939–2007

== See also ==
- Lensovet
- Governor of Saint Petersburg
- Leningrad Regional Committee of the Communist Party of the Soviet Union

== Sources ==
- World Statesmen.org
