= Kasimovsky Uyezd =

Subdivision of the Ryazan Governorate of the Russian Empire

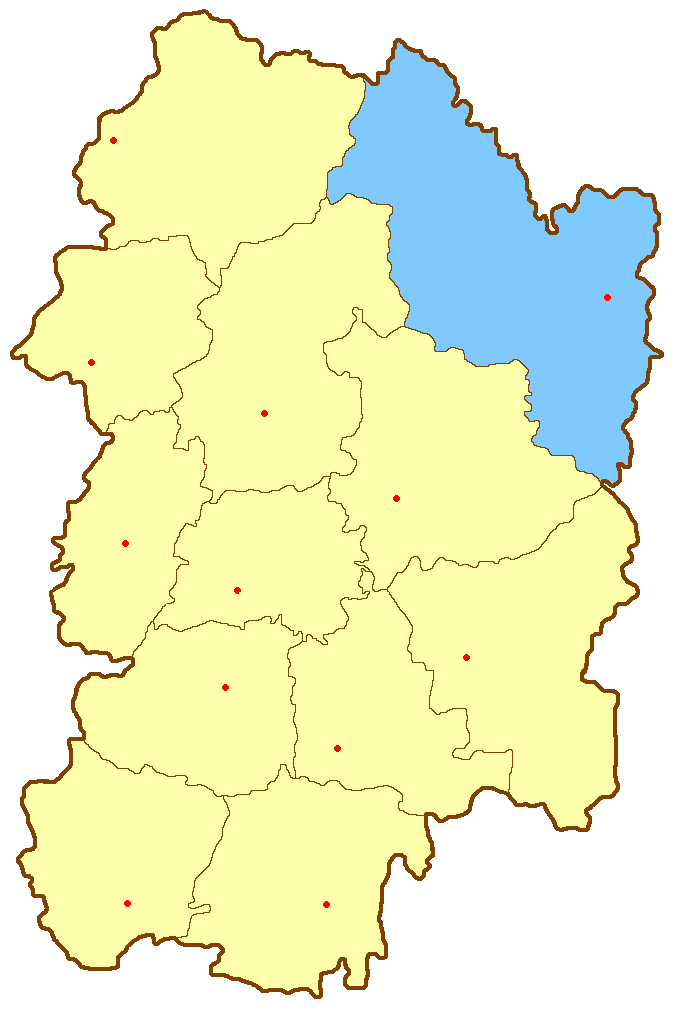
Map of Russian Empire

Kasimovsky Uyezd (Касимовский уезд) was one of the subdivisions of the Ryazan Governorate of the Russian Empire. It was situated in the northeastern part of the governorate. Its administrative centre was Kasimov.

== Demographics ==
At the time of the Russian Empire Census of 1897, Kasimovsky Uyezd had a population of 167,247. Of these, 97.1% spoke Russian and 2.8% Tatar as their native language.
