= 18th Congress of the All-Union Communist Party (Bolsheviks) =

1939 meeting of Soviet delegates

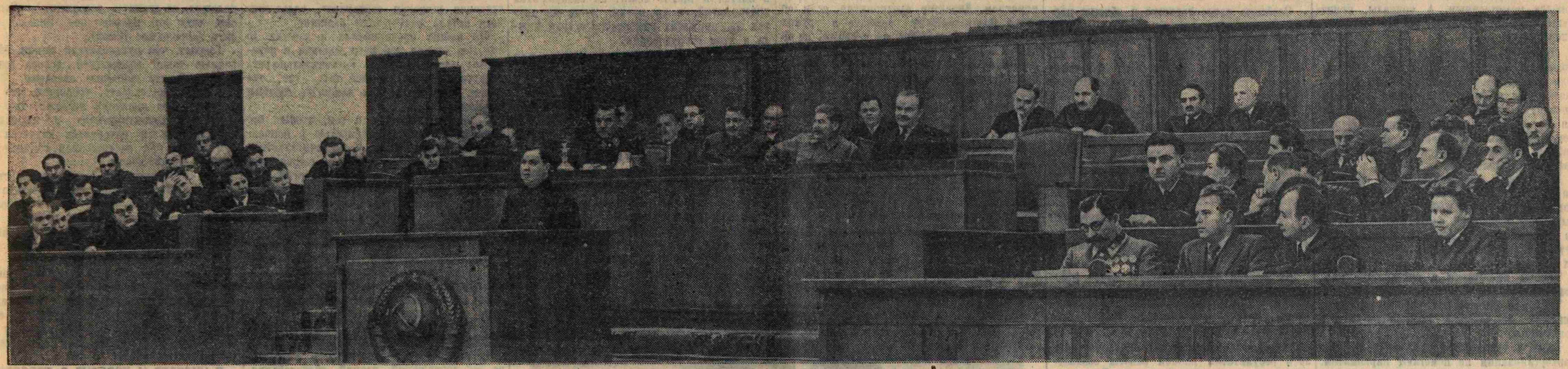
Georgy Malenkov speaking at the congress

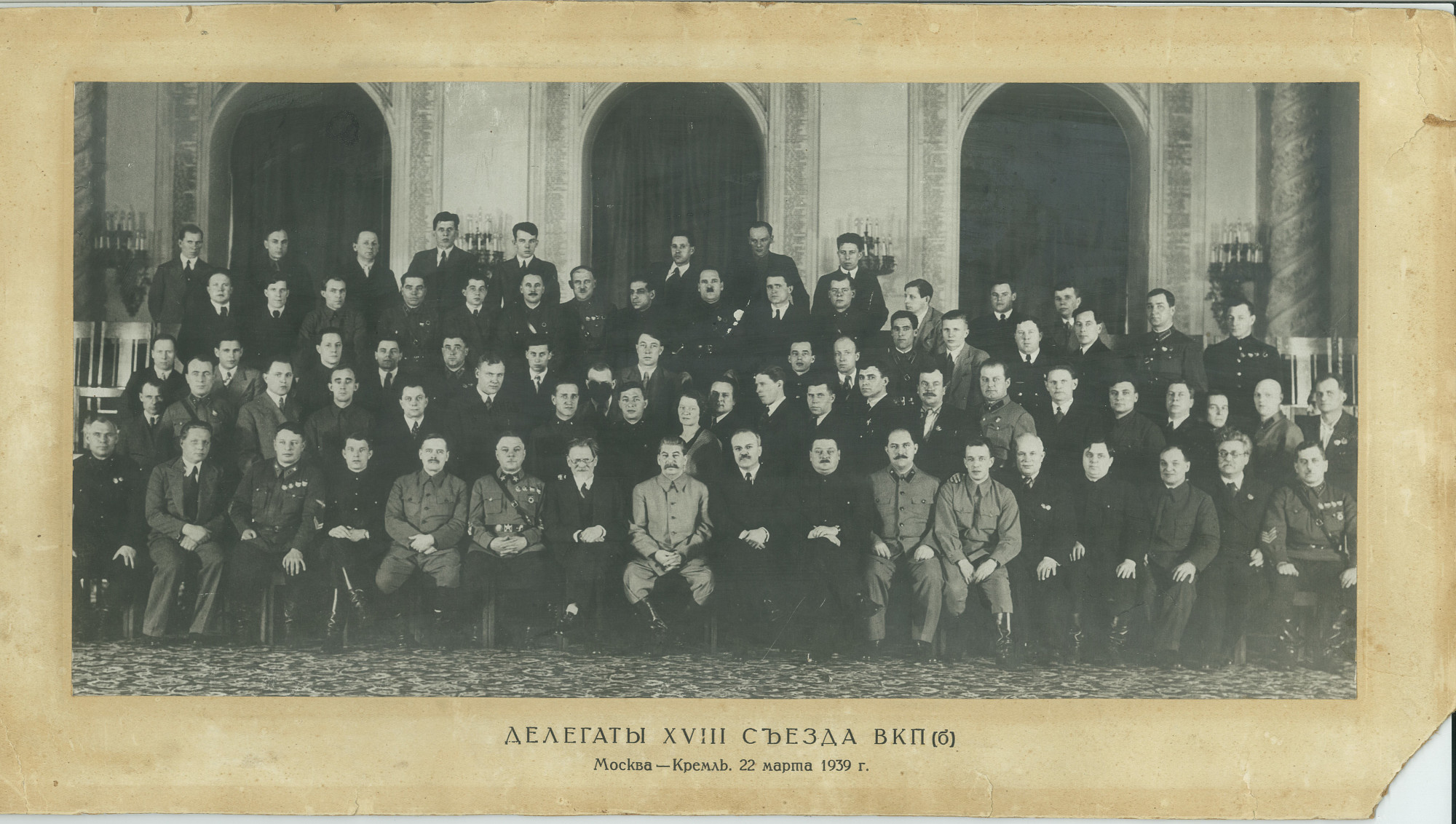
Delegates of the 18th Congress of the All-Union Communist Party (Bolsheviks) (Far East section)

The 18th Congress of the All Union Communist Party (Bolsheviks) was held during 10–21 March 1939 in Moscow. It elected the 18th Central Committee.

This is the first Congress to be dominated by the "purified" leadership of the Soviet Union after the Great Purge. This would be the last one held for over a decade.

In the report on the work of the 17th Central Committee of the Communist Party Stalin outlined important aspects of the foreign policy of the USSR, particularly its disappointment with the western democracies and their failure to adopt the policy of collective security advocated by Soviet foreign minister Maxim Litvinov. Shortly after this, Stalin dismissed Litvinov and appointed Vyacheslav Molotov, a move that led to the Molotov–Ribbentrop Pact and a temporary understanding with Nazi Germany.

== Agenda of the Congress ==
1. Stalin: Report of the Central Committee of the All-Union Communist Party (Bolsheviks)
2. Mikhail Fedorovich Vladimirski: Report of the Central Revision Committee
3. Dmitry Zakharovich Manuilski: Report of the All-Union Communist Party (Bolsheviks) Delegation to the executive committee of the Communist International
4. Vyacheslav Mikhailovich Molotov: Report on the Third Five-Years Plan for the Development of the National Economy of the USSR
5. Andrey Aleksandrovich Zhdanov: Changes in the Statutes of the All-Union Communist Party (Bolsheviks)
6. Election of the Commission in Charge of Changes in the All-Union Communist Party (Bolsheviks) Program
7. Election to the Central Organs of the Party

== Decisions of the Congress ==
The report of the Central Committee of the All-Union Communist Party (Bolsheviks) consisted of an analysis of the internal and international situation of the country, as well as its future development perspectives. The Congress took note of the now prevailing socialist mode of production and considered socialism in the USSR to be largely built, while in its view the country was already sailing towards a new step of development, i.e. the completion of the socialist society. A new goal was set: to catch and get ahead of the most developed capitalistic States. The report also tackled theoretical questions regarding the stages of development and functions of the socialist State, and viewed as erroneous the idea that the State would be soon extinct.

The Congress sanctioned the new Party's statute which was supposed to reflect changes in the class structure of the Soviet society. A unified set of conditions for entry in the All-Union Communist Party (Bolsheviks) was implemented, as well as a one-year probation period. An exception was made for former members of other parties, to which these conditions would not apply. The division into separate categories depending on each individual's social class origin was abolished. Articles defining new rights for the Party's members were also added.

The Congress also confirmed the third five-years plan for the development of the Soviet economy.

=== Elected during the Congress ===
Central Committee: 71 members, 68 candidates to Central Committee membership
Central Revision Committee: 13 members
Party Control Commission: 187 members
