= Kaliteyevo =

Kaliteyevo Калитеево
- Selo
- Location within Vladimir Oblast Location within Russia
- Coordinates: 56°15′N 39°52′E
- Country: Russia
- Region: Vladimir Oblast
- District: Sobinsky District
- Time zone: UTC+3:00

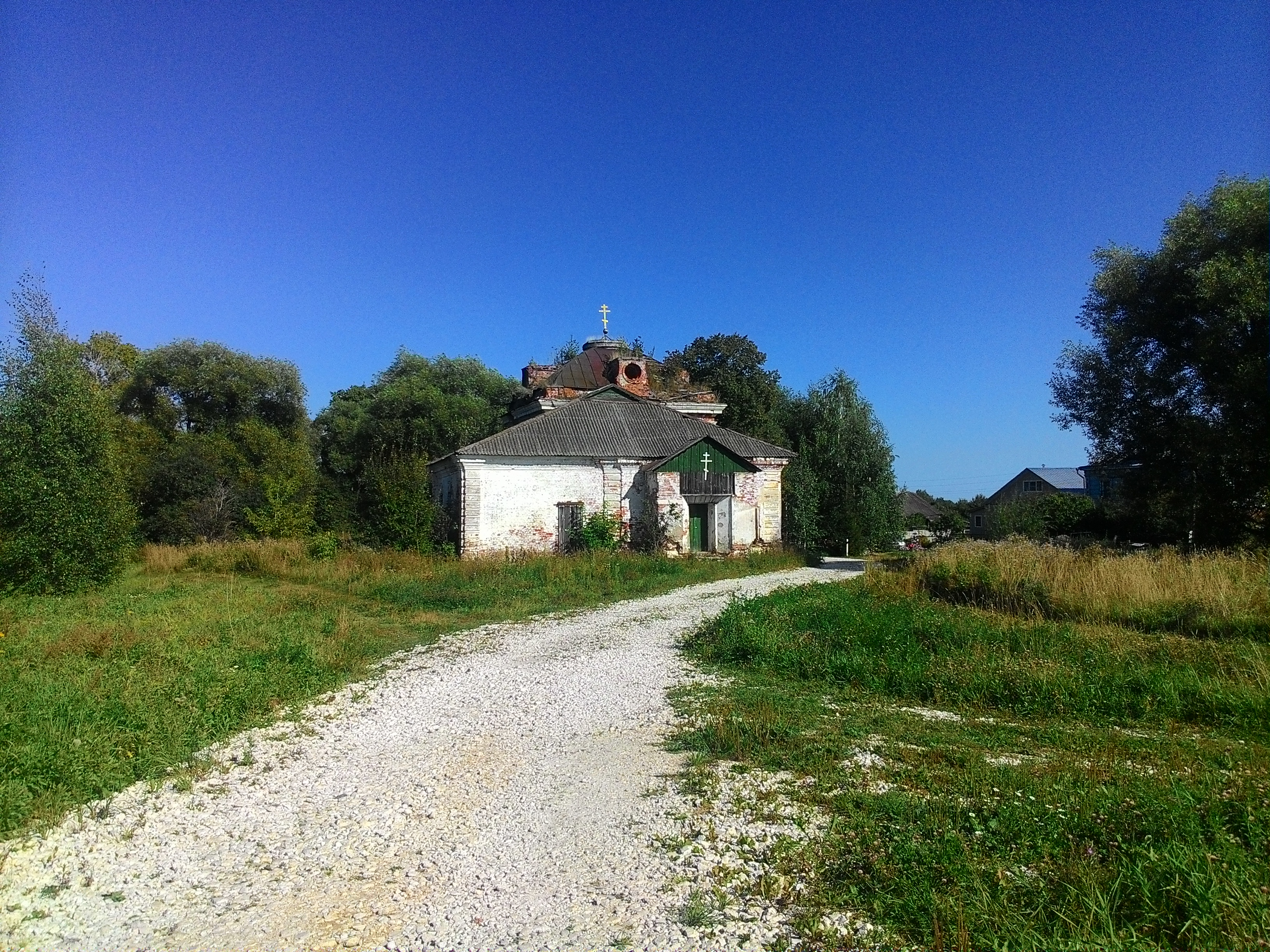

Kaliteyevo (Russian: Калитеево) is a rural locality (a selo) in Rozhdestvenskoye Rural Settlement, Sobinsky District, Vladimir Oblast, Russia. The population was 39 as of 2010.

== Geography ==
Kaliteyevo is located 43 km north of Sobinka (the district's administrative centre) by road. Yeltesunovo is the nearest rural locality.
