= Alexey Kuznetsov =

Soviet politician (1905–1950)

Alexey Kuznetsov Алексей Кузнецов
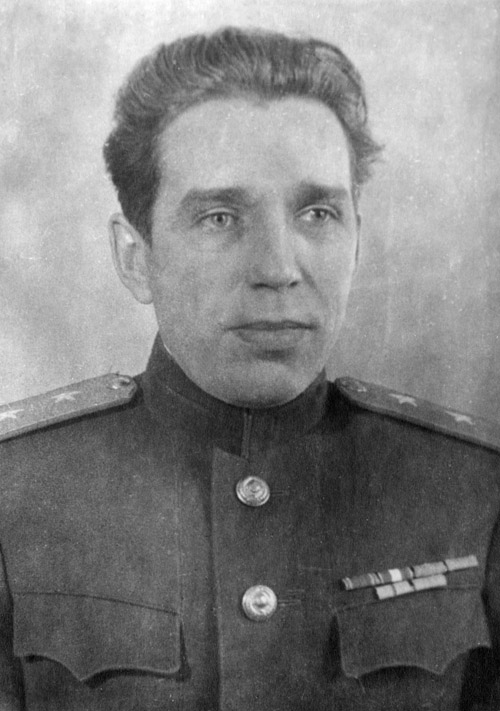

Senior Secretary of Cadres of the Communist Party of the Soviet Union
- In office 6 May 1946 – 1 July 1948
- Preceded by: Georgy Malenkov
- Succeeded by: Georgy Malenkov

First Secretary of the Leningrad Regional Party Committee
- In office 17 January 1945 – 26 March 1946
- Preceded by: Andrei Zhdanov
- Succeeded by: Pyotr Popkov
Additional positions
First Secretary of the Leningrad City Party Committee
In office 17 January 1945 – 26 March 1946
Preceded by	Andrei Zhdanov
Succeeded by	Pyotr Popkov
Member of the 18th Secretariat
In office 18 March 1946 – 28 January 1949
Member of the 18th Orgburo
In office 18 March 1946 – 7 March 1949

Personal details
- Born: 20 February 1905 Borovichi, Novgorod Governorate, Russian Empire
- Died: 1 October 1950 (aged 45) Leningrad, Russian SFSR, Soviet Union
- Citizenship: Soviet
- Party: All-Union Communist Party (Bolsheviks) (1925–1949)

Military service
- Allegiance: Soviet Union
- Branch/service: Red Army; Soviet Armed Forces
- Years of service: 1941–1949
- Rank: Lieutenant general
- Battles/wars: World War II; Eastern Front; Siege of Leningrad

Alexey Alexandrovich Kuznetsov (Note: In this name that follows East Slavic naming customs, the patronymic is Alexandrovich and the family name is Kuznetsov.) (Note: Russian: Алексей Александрович Кузнецов, romanized: Aleksey Aleksandrovich Kuznetsov) (20 February [O.S. 7 February] 1905 – 1 October 1950) was a Soviet statesman, Lieutenant General, and member of the CPSU Central Committee (1939–1949).

== Early life and career ==
Born in Borovichi, in the Novgorod Governorate of northwest Russia, he started work as teenager in a local sawmill. In 1924–32, he was an organiser of Komsomol in the Novgorod and Nizhny Novgorod provinces. In 1932, he was transferred to Leningrad (Saint Petersburg) as a minor party official, but rose quickly during the Great Purge, as more senior officials were arrested. In August 1937, he was appointed Second Secretary (deputy leader) to Leningrad CPSU gorkom (city committee) and obkom (oblast committee) making him second in command of the Leningrad province, under Andrei Zhdanov. On 19 November 1937, speaking at a public meeting in Volkhovsky District, he declared: "I consider it a great happiness to work under the leadership of Comrade Zhdanov. Under his leadership, I will continue to smash vile fascist agents. Trotskyist–Bukharin saboteurs and spies, and fight for the purity of the ranks of our great communist party."

During the Siege of Leningrad, Kuznetsov helped organize the city's defense. In January 1945, he was promoted to the post of First Secretary of the Leningrad provincial and city party committees, when his mentor, Zhdanov, was called to Moscow to serve as a Secretary of the Central Committee. On 18 March 1946, he was promoted again, to the post of Secretary of the Central Committee, replacing Georgy Malenkov as the head of party organisation, and working alongside Zhdanov and Stalin. He was also given responsibility for supervising the police. This made a threat to the former head of the NKVD, Lavrentiy Beria. Aged 41, he was now part of the 'inner circle' of the roughly nine most powerful Soviet officials, but "Kuznetsov's promotions earned him the undying hatred of the two most vindictive predators in the Stalinist jungle: Beria and Malenkov."

== Leningrad affair ==
Kuznetsov's political position became exposed after the death of Zhdanov, in August 1948. On 15 February 1949, he was sacked and accused of 'non-Bolshevik deviation". This may have been because Kuznetsov had been digging into the death of Politburo member Sergei Kirov—suspicion of Stalin's involvement in this murder has never been put to rest—though the official charge against him and several leaders of the Leningrad Party related to the organisation of a wholesale trade fair in Leningrad without proper approval, in what came to be known as the Leningrad affair. He was appointed Secretary of the Far Eastern Bureau of the CPSU.

On 13 August 1949, Kuznetsov was summoned to Malenkov's office with other former Leningrad officials, and arrested, in connection with the Leningrad affair. Soviet leaders accused the trade fair organisers of denigrating the Central Committee and presenting themselves as special defenders of Leningrad. Kuznetsov was forced to sign a confession under torture, but when put on trial with Gosplan chairman Nikolai Voznesensky on 29 September 1950, he refused to confess, insisting, "I am a Bolshevik and remain one in spite of the sentence I have received. History will justify us." This allegedly angered Stalin and embarrassed police chief Viktor Abakumov, but did not help Kuznetsov, who was sentenced to death. Kuznetsov was rehabilitated posthumously on 30 April 1954, after the deaths of Stalin and Beria.

== Personal life ==
With his wife Zinaida, Kuznetsov had a son, Valery, and a daughter, Alla. Alla was married to Sergo Mikoyan, son of Anastas. They were engaged at the time of the downfall of Kuznetsov. The Mikoyan family did not attempt to stop the wedding on 18 February 1949. Kuznetsov attended the wedding, despite his fear that he might be putting his daughter at risk.

== Honours and awards ==
- Two Orders of Lenin
- Medal "For the Defence of Leningrad"

== Bibliography ==
- Conquest, Robert (1961). Power and Policy in the U.S.S.R.: The Study of Soviet Dynastics. London: MacMillan.
- Montefiore, Simon Sebag (2004). Stalin: The Court of the Red Tsar. London: Phoenix. ISBN 0-75381-766-7.
- Shakarian, Pietro A. (2025). Anastas Mikoyan: An Armenian Reformer in Khrushchev's Kremlin. Bloomington: Indiana University Press. ISBN 978-0253073556.
