= Frol Kozlov =

Soviet politician and statesman (1908–1965)

- Фрол Козлов
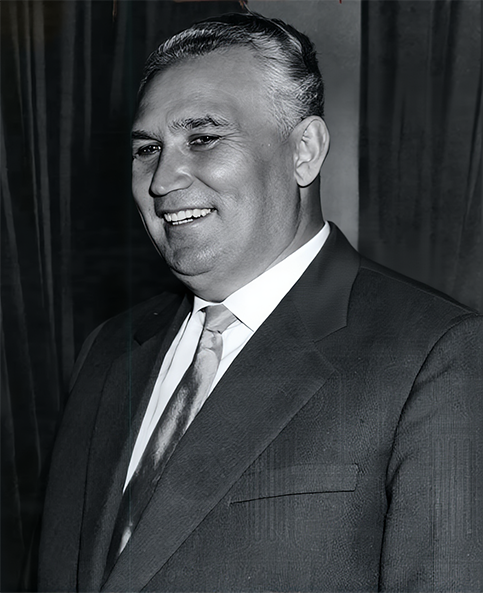
- Kozlov in 1959

Second Secretary of the Communist Party of the Soviet Union
- In office 5 April 1960 – 21 June 1963
- Preceded by: Aleksey Kirichenko (de facto)
- Succeeded by: Leonid Brezhnev

Chairman of the Council of Ministers of the Russian SFSR
- In office 19 December 1957 – 31 March 1958
- President: Mikhail Tarasov
- Preceded by: Mikhail Yasnov
- Succeeded by: Dmitry Polyansky

Senior Secretary of Cadres of the Communist Party of the Soviet Union
- In office 5 April 1960 – 21 June 1963
- Preceded by: Aleksey Kirichenko
- Succeeded by: Nikolai Podgorny

Personal details
- Born: 18 August 1908 Loshchinino, Kasimovsky Uyezd, Ryazan Governorate, Russian Empire
- Died: 30 January 1965 (aged 56) Moscow, Russian SFSR, Soviet Union
- Resting place: Kremlin Wall Necropolis, Moscow
- Party: Communist Party of the Soviet Union (1926–1964)
- Central institution membership: 1960–1964: Member of the 20th, 22nd Secretariat; 1957–1964: Member of the 20th–21st, 22nd Politburo; Other political offices held: 1950–1952: First Secretary of the Leningrad City Committee of the Communist Party of the Soviet Union; 1953–1957: First Secretary of the Leningrad Regional Committee of the CPSU; 1958–1960: First Deputy Chairman of the Council of Ministers of the Soviet Union

Frol Romanovich Kozlov (Russian: Фрол Романович Козлов; 18 August [O.S. 5 August] 1908 – 30 January 1965) was a Soviet politician and a member Secretariat from 1960 to 1964. He was a Hero of the Socialist Labour (1961).

== Biography ==
Kozlov was born in the village of Loshchinino (Лощинино), Kasimovsky Uyezd of Ryazan Governorate. In 1921 he graduated from the first level of school. He began his career in 1923 as a labourer at a Kasimovsky spinning factory. At the same time, he studied at the Factory Apprenticeship School. In November 1923 he became a member of the Komsomol, and in 1925 he was elected executive secretary of the Komsomol factory team. Between 1953 and 1957, Kozlov was the first secretary of the Leningrad Oblast CPSU Committee. He was elected a candidate member of the Presidium (as the Politburo of the Central Committee of the Communist Party of the Soviet Union was then called) on 14 February 1957 and served as a full member on 29 June 1957.

In July 1959, he visited the secretive Bohemian Grove encampment in northern California.

On 5 April 1960, he was elected as the Party's Senior Secretary of Cadres. Later, he became the de facto Second Secretary of the CPSU from 1960–1963 until being replaced by Leonid Brezhnev. While initially considered Khrushchev's likely successor, Kozlov's position in the Soviet leadership was significantly undermined by the effects of his alcoholism. He was relieved of his duties on 16 November 1964, following the ousting of his mentor, Nikita Khrushchev. At the time of his removal, Kozlov had already suffered a stroke, and he died shortly after his removal from office at the age of 56. He was honored with a state funeral and his ashes were buried in the Kremlin Wall Necropolis. In 1992, he was deemed partly responsible for the June 1962 Novocherkassk massacre.

== Decorations and awards ==
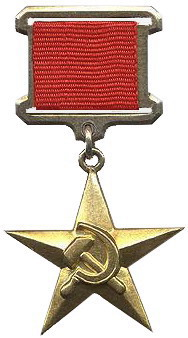
Hero of the Socialist Labour (1961)
Order of Lenin, four times (1955, 1957, 1958 & 1961)
Order of the Patriotic War, 2nd class (1945)
Order of the Red Banner of Labour, twice (1943 & 1948)
Order of the Red Star (1942)

Party political offices
Preceded by Aleksey Kirichenko	Second Secretary of the Communist Party of the Soviet Union; 5 April 1960 – 15 July 1964	Succeeded by Leonid Brezhnev
Preceded by Aleksey Kirichenko	Senior Secretary of Cadres of the Communist Party of the Soviet Union; 4 May 1960 – 21 June 1963	Succeeded by Nikolai Podgorny
