= Aleksandr Shcherbakov (Soviet politician) =

Soviet politician

- Александр Щербаков
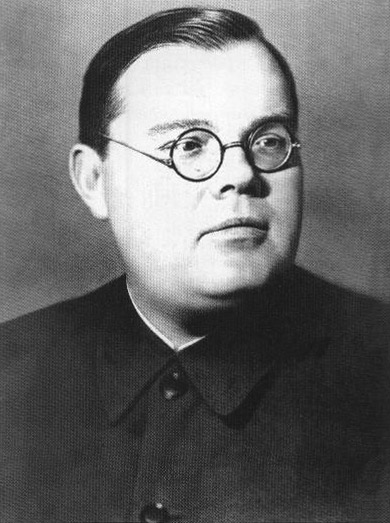

First Secretary of the Communist Party in Moscow
- In office 2 December 1938 – 10 May 1945
- Preceded by: Aleksandr Ugarov
- Succeeded by: Georgy Popov

Candidate member of the 18th Politburo
- In office 21 February 1941 – 10 May 1945

Member of the 18th Secretariat
- In office 5 May 1941 – 10 May 1945

Member of the 18th Orgburo
- In office 22 March 1939 – 10 May 1945

Personal details
- Born: 10 October 1901 Ruza, Moscow Governorate, Russian Empire
- Died: 10 May 1945 (aged 43) Moscow, Russian SFSR, Soviet Union
- Resting place: Kremlin Wall Necropolis, Moscow
- Party: Russian Communist Party (1918–1945)
- Education: Institute of Red Professors

Aleksandr Sergeyevich Shcherbakov (Russian: Алекса́ндр Серге́евич Щербако́в; 10 October [O.S. 27 September] 1901 – 10 May 1945) was a Soviet politician and statesman who was a wartime head of the Main Political Directorate of the Red Army as well as the director of the Soviet Information Bureau.

== Career ==
Shcherbakov was born into a working-class family in Ruza, near Moscow. The family moved to Rybinsk after his father's death in 1907. After primary school, he was sent to work as an apprentice, at the age of 12, in a Rybinsk print works. He was sent to work in a factory at the age of 10. He joined the Red Guards in 1917, and joined the Communist Party in 1918. He worked for Komsomol in Rybinsk during the Russian Civil War. In 1921–24, he studied at Sverdlov University, Moscow. In 1924, he started work as a party official in Nizhny Novgorod, where he gained the trust of the provincial party boss, Andrei Zhdanov. In 1930–32, he studied at the Institute of Red Professors. In 1932, he was transferred to party headquarters in Moscow. In 1934, after Zhdanov had moved to Moscow to take charge of the party's cultural policies, Shcherbakov was appointed head of the Cultural-Education department of the Central Committee of the Communist Party of the Soviet Union, and, after the first Soviet Writers' Congress, in August 1934, he was appointed First Secretary of the Union of Soviet Writers, although he "was not a writer but a full-time party apparatchik, and had not even been a Congress delegate." This meant that he ran the union, while the writer Maxim Gorky held the honorary position of chairman.

Following the latter's death in 1936, Shcherbakov was transferred back to full time party work as Second Secretary of the Leningrad Regional Party Committee, under Zhdanov. During the Great Purge, he served "as a mobile purger to various reluctant provinces." In 1937–38, he was First Secretary of the East Siberian regional party, based in Irkutsk. For part of 1938, he was First Secretary in the Donetsk region of Ukraine. Late in 1938, he became First Secretary of the Moscow Regional Party Committee in 1938, a post he held until his death.

During the German-Soviet War, Shcherbakov served as the head of the political directorate of the Red Army (with the rank of colonel general) in Moscow, and at the same time was director of the Soviet Information Bureau. According to Antony Beevor's book, Stalingrad, The Fateful Siege: 1942–1943, "One of the richest sources in the Russian Ministry of Defence central archive at Podolsk consists of the very detailed reports sent daily from the Stalingrad Front to Aleksandr Shcherbakov."

After the Comintern was officially dissolved on 15 May 1943, its organizational framework continued as the International Department, with Aleksandr Shcherbakov serving as the International Department’s formal head from 1943 to 1945, with Georgy Dimitrov and Dmitry Manuilsky assigned as his deputies.

Shcherbakov died of heart failure on 10 May 1945, right after Victory Day, and the following year the town of Rybinsk was renamed Shcherbakov in his honour (its original name was restored in 1957). In January 1953, TASS announced that he had been murdered, a victim of the Doctors' plot. This story was discredited later that same year, after Stalin's death.

== Personality ==
The real causes of Shcherbakov's death were obesity and excessive drinking. The writer Aleksandr Solzhenitsyn knew Shcherbakov's former chauffeur, from whom he learnt that "the obese Shcherbakov hated to see people around when he arrived at his Informburo, so they temporarily removed all those who were working in the offices he had to walk through. Grunting because of his fat, he would lean down and pull up a corner of the carpet. The whole Informburo caught it if he found any dust there." Nikita Khrushchev, who had a very negative attitude towards him and considered Shcherbakov to be "a poisonous snake" and "one of the most contemptible characters around Stalin" wrote that "Shcherbakov ended up drinking himself to death – and he drank not so much because he had a craving for alcohol, but simply because it pleased Stalin when people around him drank themselves under the table." According to historian Natalia Borisova “he (Shcherbakov) enjoyed enormous authority in Moscow. He was respected, even revered, listening to every word. Many later remembered him as a most noble man, a spiritual aristocrat, an exceptional personality”.

== Family ==
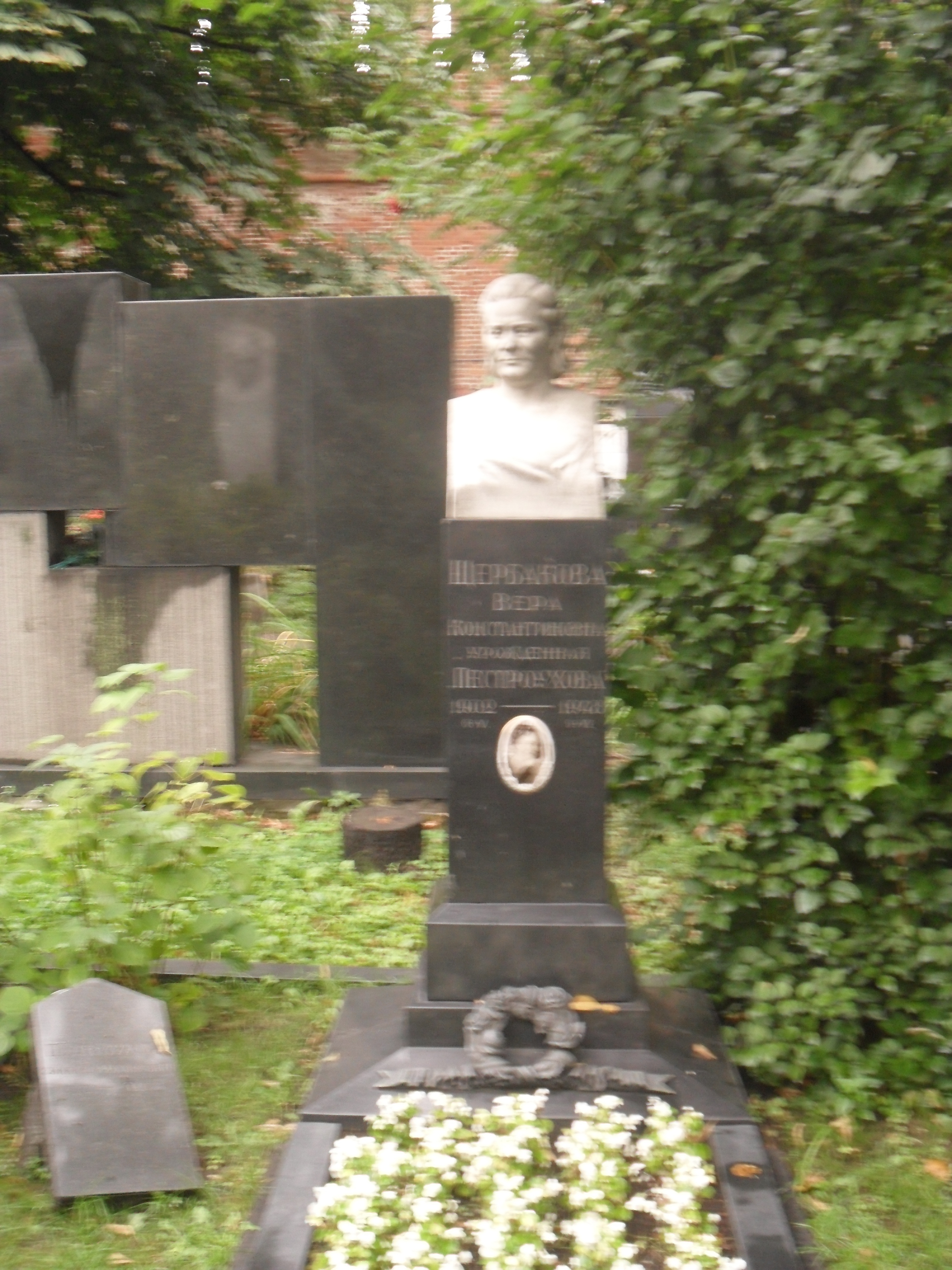
Wife's and mother-in-law's grave on elite Novodevichy Cemetery.

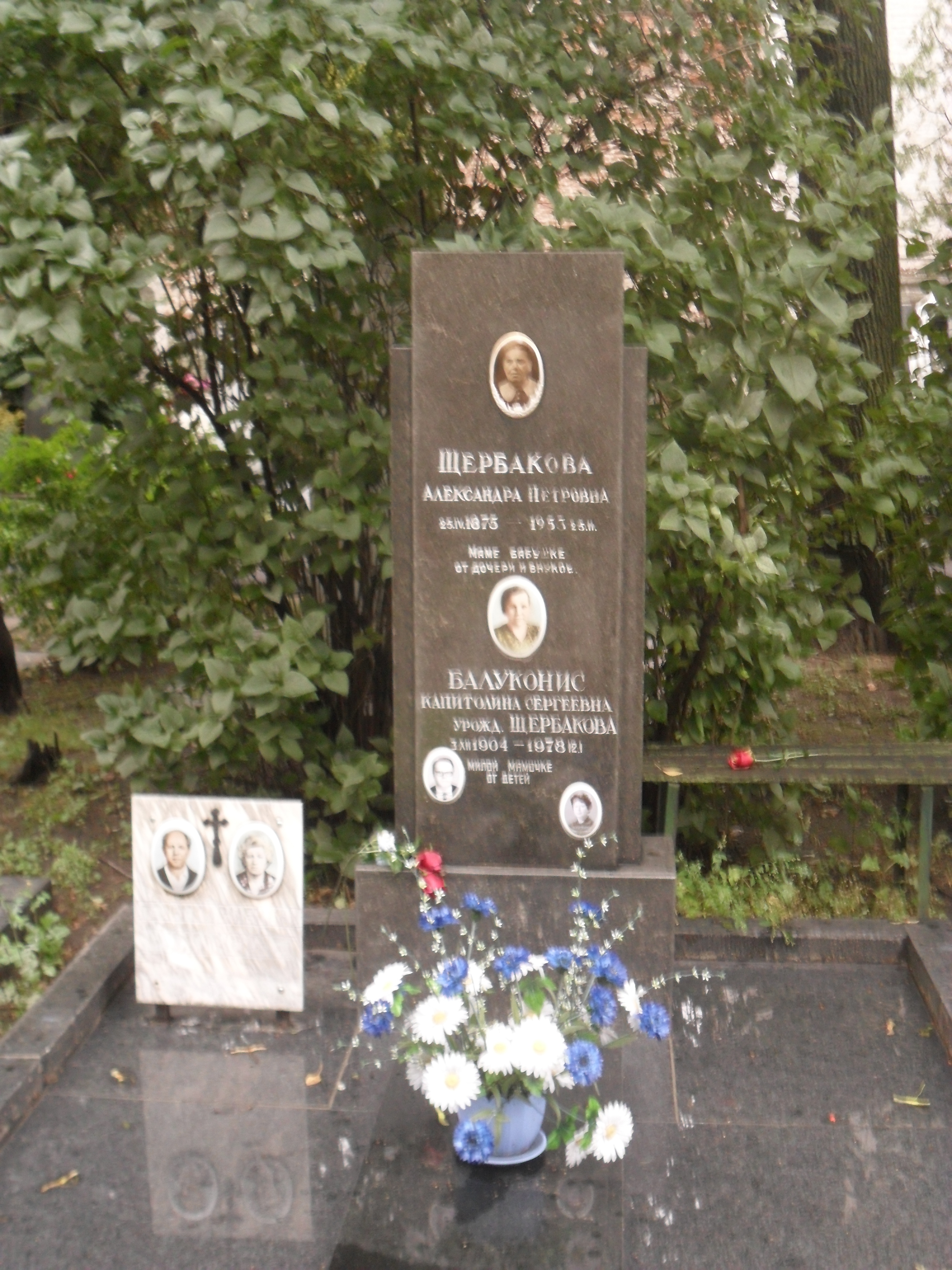
Mother's and sister's grave on elite Novodevichy Cemetery.

- Wife is Vera Konstantinovna Scherbakova, née Pestroukhova (1902-05-06 — 1948-06-09) — communications engineer. She shared three sons with Alexander:
  - col. Alexander Alexandrovich Scherbakov (1925–2013) — a Honoured Test Pilot of the USSR, a Hero of the Soviet Union, Ph.D.;
    - granddaughter Elena Alexandrovna Scherbakova (b. 1952), People's Performer of the Russian Federation, a ballet dancer, a choreographer, laureate of government award, art director of Igor Moiseyev State Academic Ensemble of Popular Dance.
  - Konstantin Alexandrovich Scherbakov (b. 1938) — Russian film scholar and writer, Honored Artist of the Russian Federation;
  - Ivan Alexandrovich Scherbakov (b. 1944) — physicist, full member of Russian Academy of Sciences, former director of GPI RAS.
