= Georgy Malenkov =

Leader of the Soviet Union from 1953 to 1955

- Георгий Маленков
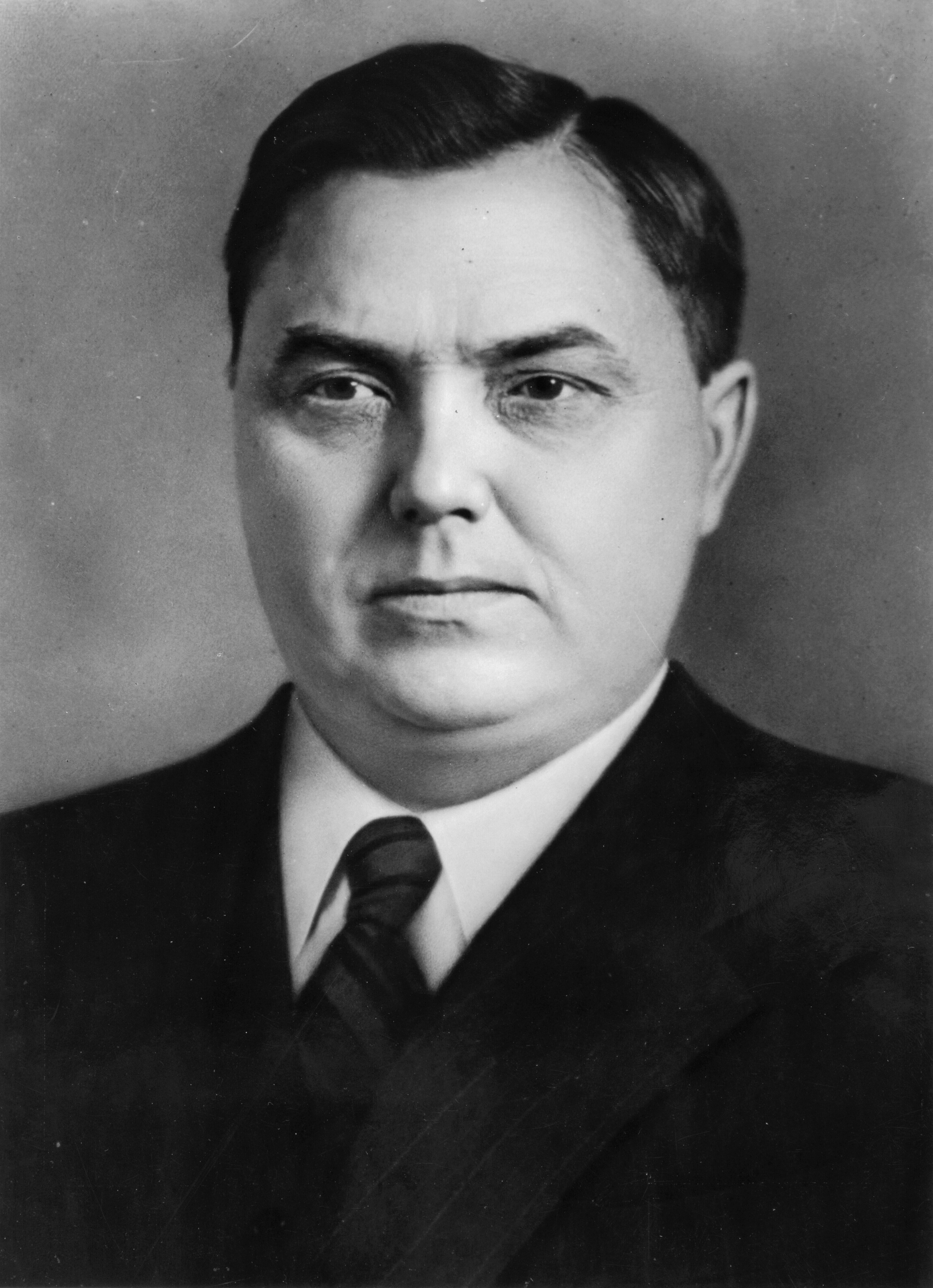
- Official portrait, 1950

Premier of the Soviet Union
- In office 5 March 1953 – 8 February 1955
- President: Nikolai Shvernik; Kliment Voroshilov
- First Deputies: Vyacheslav Molotov; Nikolai Bulganin; Lavrentiy Beria; Lazar Kaganovich
- Preceded by: Joseph Stalin
- Succeeded by: Nikolai Bulganin

Deputy Premier of the Soviet Union
- In office 9 February 1955 – 29 June 1957
- Premier: Nikolai Bulganin
- In office 2 August 1946 – 5 March 1953
- Premier: Joseph Stalin
- In office 15 May 1944 – 15 March 1946
- Premier: Joseph Stalin

Second Secretary of the Communist Party of the Soviet Union
- In office 31 August 1948 – 16 October 1952
- Gensek (Note: General Secretary of the Communist Party of the Soviet Union): Joseph Stalin
- Preceded by: Andrei Zhdanov
- Succeeded by: Nikita Khrushchev (de facto)

Personal details
- Born: 8 January 1902 Orenburg, Russia
- Died: 14 January 1988 (aged 86) Moscow, Soviet Union
- Resting place: Kuntsevo Cemetery
- Party: Communist Party of the Soviet Union (1920–1961)
- Domestic partner: Valeriya Golubtsova (1920–1987)
- Children: 3
- Education: Moscow Highest Technical School
- Profession: Engineer; politician
- Central institution membership: 1946–1957: Full member, 18th, 19th, 20th Presidium; 1948–1953: Member, 18th, 19th Secretariat; 1941–1946: Candidate member, 18th Politburo; 1939–1946: Member, 18th Secretariat; 1939–1952: Member, 18th Orgburo; Leader of the Soviet Union: ← Stalin; Khrushchev →

Georgy Maximilianovich Malenkov (Note: Russian: Георгий Максимилианович Маленков, romanized: Georgy Maksimilianovich Malenkov) (8 January 1902 [O.S. 26 December 1901] – 14 January 1988) was a Soviet politician who succeeded Joseph Stalin as Premier and the overall leader of the Soviet Union in March 1953. Shortly thereafter, Malenkov entered into a power struggle with the party's First Secretary, Nikita Khrushchev, which culminated in his removal from the premiership in 1955 as well as the Central Committee Presidium in 1957.

Born and raised in Orenburg, Malenkov served in the Red Army during the Russian Civil War and joined the Communist Party in 1920. Beginning in 1925, he served in the staff of the party's Organizational Bureau (Orgburo), where he was entrusted with overseeing member records. In this role, Malenkov was heavily involved in facilitating Stalin's purges of the party's ranks during the 1930s. By 1939, he became a member of the Central Committee Secretariat. During World War II, Malenkov was appointed to the State Defense Committee where he was charged with overseeing aircraft and missile production. After the war's end, he became a full member of the Politburo in 1946. Later in 1948, Malenkov succeeded Andrei Zhdanov as Second Secretary of the Communist Party of the Soviet Union.

Upon Stalin's death on 5 March 1953, Malenkov succeeded him as Chairman of the Council of Ministers and the highest-ranking Secretary of the Central Committee. On 14 March, his colleagues within the Politburo (then known as the Presidium) forced him to give up his membership in the Secretariat, thereby allowing Nikita Khrushchev to become the party's acting First Secretary. Subsequently, Malenkov contented himself with serving as the Presidium's highest-ranking member and chairman until eventually being eclipsed by Khrushchev as the undisputed leader of the Soviet Union. After being compelled to leave office as Premier in February 1955, he conspired with other members of the Presidium to remove Khrushchev from the Soviet leadership. When the attempted coup by the so-called "Anti-Party Group" failed in 1957, Malenkov was dismissed from the Presidium and expelled from the party altogether by 1961. He kept a low profile for the rest of his life and died in 1988 of natural causes.

== Early life and education ==
Malenkov was born in Orenburg in the Russian Empire on 8 January 1902. His paternal ancestors emigrated during the 18th century from the Ottoman Empire (present day North Macedonia). Some of them served as officers in the Russian Imperial Army. His father was a wealthy farmer in Orenburg province. Young Malenkov occasionally helped his father to do business selling the harvest. His mother was a daughter of a blacksmith and a granddaughter of an Orthodox priest.

Malenkov graduated from Orenburg gymnasium just a few months prior to the Russian Revolution of 1917.

== Rise to the Soviet Leadership ==
=== Early Career in the Communist Party ===
In 1918, Malenkov joined the Red Army as a volunteer and fought alongside the Communists against White Russian forces in the Civil War. He joined the Communist Party of the Soviet Union (CPSU) in 1920 and worked as a political commissar on a propaganda train in Turkestan during the Civil War.

After the Russian civil war, Malenkov quickly built himself a reputation of a tough communist Bolshevik. He was promoted in the Communist party ranks and was appointed Communist secretary at the military-based Moscow Higher Technical School in the 1920s. Russian sources state that, rather than continuing with his studies, Malenkov took up a career as a Soviet politician. His university degree was never completed, and his records have been indefinitely classified. Around this time, Malenkov forged a close friendship with Vyacheslav Malyshev, who later became chief of the Soviet nuclear program alongside Igor Kurchatov.

In 1924, Stalin noticed Malenkov and assigned him to the Orgburo of the Central Committee of the Soviet Communist Party. In 1925, Malenkov worked in the staff of the Organizational Bureau (Orgburo) of the Central Committee of the CPSU.

=== The Great Purge ===
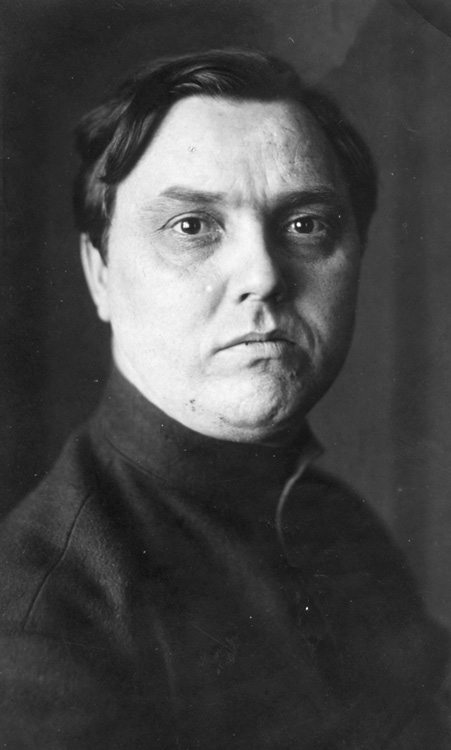
Malenkov in 1932

Malenkov was in charge of keeping records on the members of the Soviet communist party; two million files were made under his supervision during the next ten years. In this work, he became closely associated with Stalin and was heavily involved in the treason trials during the Great Purge. Stalin sent Malenkov to various parts of the Soviet Union to purge local party cadres, including in Byelorussia, Armenia, Tatarstan, Omsk, Saratov, Tambov, Tula, and Yaroslavl. In this role, he participated in the interrogation and beating of alleged "enemies". According to Pietro Shakarian, Malenkov "theatrically declared" after one interrogation in Yerevan that "the greatest humanist Maxim Gorky once said: 'if the enemy does not surrender, destroy him.' " Dmitrii Sukhanov, Malenkov's personal assistant, later recounted that Malenkov and Lavrentiy Beria "developed a close friendship" during the repressions in Yerevan and that this "formed the basis for their later political alliance."

In 1938, Malenkov was one of the key figures in bringing about the downfall of Nikolai Yezhov, the head of the NKVD. In 1939, he became the head of the Communist party's Cadres Directorate, which gave him control over personnel matters of party bureaucracy. During the same year, he also became a member and a Secretary of the Central Committee and rose from his previous staff position to full member of the Orgburo. In February 1941, Malenkov became a candidate member of the Politburo.

=== World War II ===
After the German invasion of June 1941, Malenkov was promoted to the State Defense Committee (SDC), along with Beria (now chief of the NKVD), Kliment Voroshilov, and Vyacheslav Molotov with Stalin as the committee's head. This small group held total control over all the political and economic life in the country and Malenkov's membership thus made him one of the top five most powerful men in the Soviet Union during World War II. Between 1941 and 1943, Malenkov's primary responsibility in the SDC was supervising military aircraft production as well as supervising development of nuclear weapons. In 1943, he also became chairman of a committee that oversaw the post-war economic rehabilitation of some liberated areas with the exception of Leningrad.

=== Soviet nuclear missiles ===
Stalin gave Malenkov the task of building nuclear missiles in collaboration with Beria. Malenkov was appointed Chief of the Soviet Missile program, his first deputy was Dmitri Ustinov, a 33-year-old rocket scientist who later became one of the most powerful Soviet Defence Ministers. During World War II, Malenkov, Ustinov, and Mikhail Khrunichev started the Soviet missile and rocket program that soon absorbed the German missile industry. Malenkov supervised the takeover of German V2 missile industry that was moved from Peenemünde to Moscow for further development that resulted in the building of Vostok missiles and orbiting Sputnik a few years later. At the same time, Malenkov followed Stalin's orders of building several space centers, such as Kapustin Yar near the Volga river and Khrunichev missile center in Moscow.

Malenkov's main role was supervising the top staff. He took a keen interest in recruiting the most talented young engineers and scientists produced by the university system. Instead of cross-examining candidates for their loyalty to the theoretical ideology of communism, Malenkov looked for team members with strong technical skills who could invent, improve, and manufacture munitions most quickly and efficiently. He downplayed the role of the omnipresent commissars who understood little technology but were charged with ideological purification. The long-run lesson was that economic growth was the nation's highest priority.

=== Defeating Zhdanovshchina ===
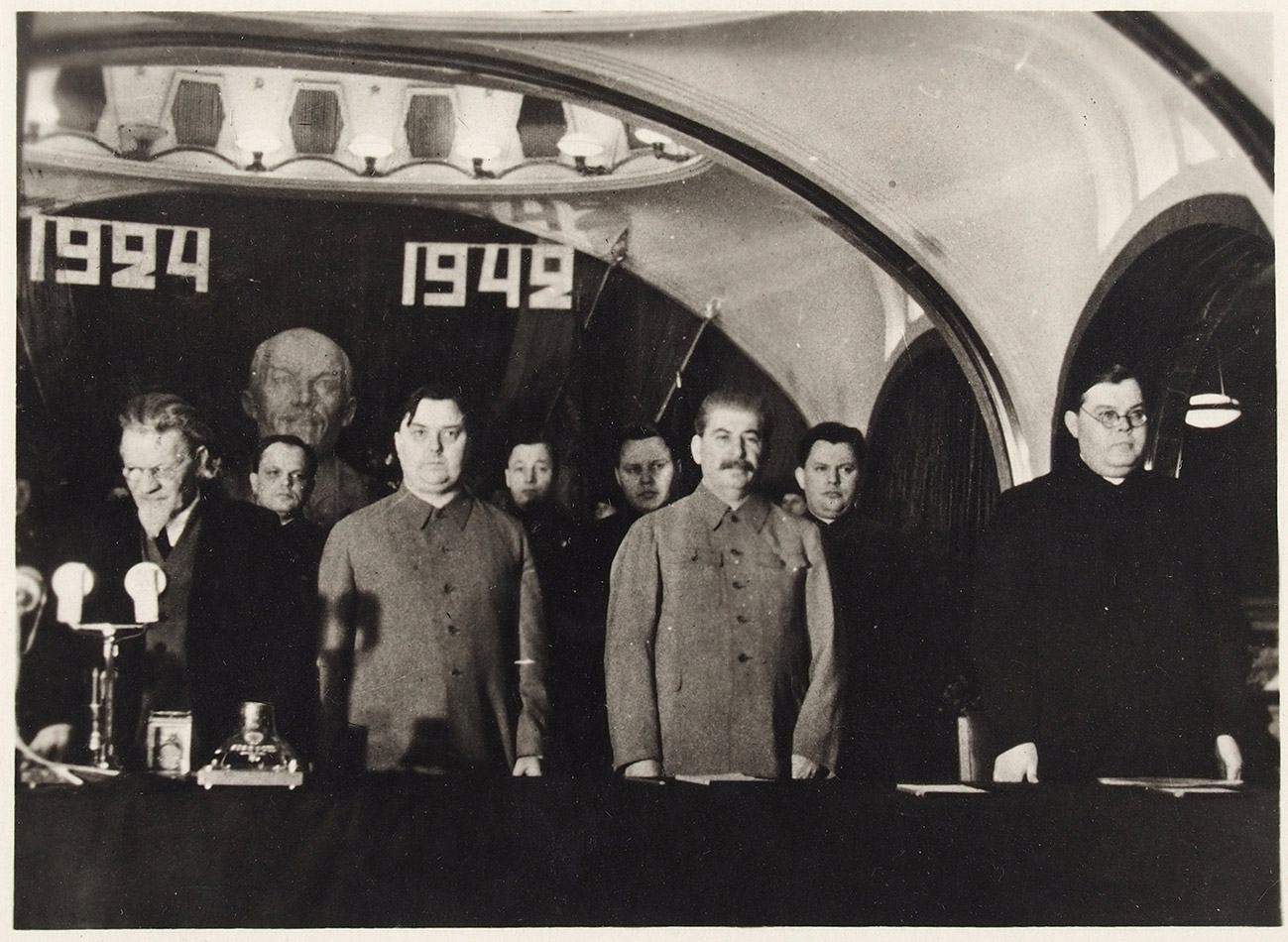
Mikhail Kalinin, Georgy Malenkov, Joseph Stalin and Aleksandr Shcherbakov at the commemoration of the 18th anniversary of Lenin's death.

"Zhdanovshchina" was the emphasis on purified communist ideology developed during the Second World War by Andrei Zhdanov. It emerged from Zhdanov's debates inside the party hierarchy opposing Malenkov's pragmatist faction. Malenkov stressed universal values of science and engineering, and proposed to promote technological experts to the highest positions in the Soviet administrative elite. Zhdanov's faction said proper ideology trumped science and called for prioritizing political education and ideological purity. However the technocrats had proven amazingly successful during the war in terms of engineering, industrial production, and development of advanced munitions.

Zhdanov sought to use the ideological purification of the party as a vehicle to restore the Kremlin's political control over the provinces and the technocrats. He worried that the provincial party bosses and the heads of the economic ministries had achieved too high a degree of autonomy during the war, when the top leadership realized the urgent need for maximum mobilization of human and material resources. The highest priority in the postwar era was physical reconstruction after the massive wartime destruction. The same argument that strengthened the technocrats continues to operate, and the united opposition of Malenkov, the technocrats, the provincial party bosses, and the key ministries doomed Zhdanov's proposals. He therefore pivoted to devote Zhdanovshchina to purification of the arts and culture.

=== Attack on Georgy Zhukov ===
Georgy Zhukov was the most prominent Soviet military commander during World War II, winning several critical battles, such as the Siege of Leningrad, the Battle of Stalingrad, and the Battle of Berlin. Stalin, Beria, and Malenkov grew suspicious of Zhukov, worrying he possessed capitalistic tendencies, because Zhukov established a friendship with General Dwight D. Eisenhower, invited the future American president to Leningrad and Moscow, and endorsed collaboration between the United States and the Soviet Union.

Shortly after World War II, Malenkov sided against several who were considered Soviet war heroes, among them Zhukov, Konstantin Rokossovsky, and several other popular generals. Malenkov's accusations against Zhukov were mostly based upon allegations of counter-revolutionary behavior and selfish "Bonapartism". Soon Zhukov was demoted in rank and moved to a lower position in Odessa where his only foes were local Party forces. Zhukov had his first heart attack not long after, and Malenkov's concerns about him largely faded.

After the attack on Zhukov, Malenkov gained strength and became closer to Stalin and several other top communists. In 1946, Malenkov was named a candidate member of the Politburo. Although temporarily trailing behind his rival Zhdanov (see also Aviators Affair), he soon returned to Stalin's favor, especially after Zhdanov's death in 1948. That same year, Malenkov became a Secretary of the Central Committee.

=== Competitors, Leningrad affair ===
During the late 1940s and early 1950s Malenkov gained more favor with Stalin than any other top Soviet communist. Malenkov's main competition were the leaders of Leningrad whose glory had been earned in resistance to Hitler's attacks during World War II. After the Siege of Leningrad, Leningrad party leader Alexey Kuznetsov and his deputies earned much fame and support all over the USSR. Malenkov followed Stalin's policy of suppressing that glory in order to maintain Moscow's image as the USSR's only center of power.

In 1949, Malenkov personally came to Leningrad leading a regiment of armed men from Moscow MGB special forces and swiftly removed and arrested the city leaders. After a series of secret trials, 23 men, including the Mayor and deputies, were executed and buried in an unmarked pit on the outskirts of the city. At the same time, over two thousand top managers and intellectuals were uprooted and exiled from Leningrad to Siberia, their property was confiscated, and their positions were filled by communists loyal to Stalin.

During the same years, Malenkov also exterminated the Jewish Anti-Fascist Committee. Many members of the Jewish Anti-Fascist Committee were killed in the Night of the Murdered Poets. On 12 August 1952, thirteen Jewish writers were executed for treason in the basement of Lubyanka Prison. This was approved by Stalin and supervised by Malenkov. 1952 and 1953 Time magazine covers indicate that Malenkov was generally considered to be Stalin's apprentice and successor.

== Premier of the Soviet Union (1953–1955) ==
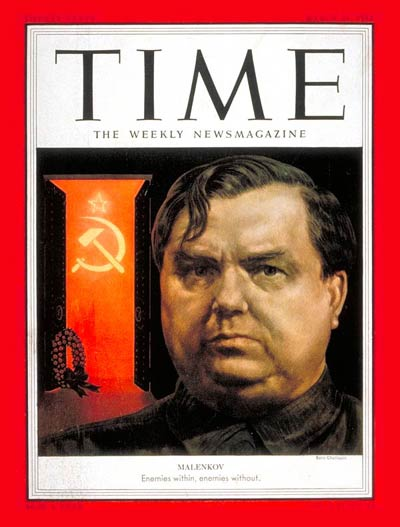
Malenkov on the cover of Time magazine, 23 March 1953

In the ensuing political vacuum of Stalin's demise, a triumvirate (a.k.a. troika) assumed power in his place comprising Interior Minister Lavrentiy Beria, Foreign Minister Vyacheslav Molotov, and Georgy Malenkov as the new Premier of the Soviet Union. Under the troika, most government ministries were brought under Malenkov's direct oversight while Soviet diplomacy and the secret police apparatus (i.e. the MVD) were entrusted to Molotov and Beria respectively.

In addition to succeeding Stalin as Premier, Malenkov initially assumed his position as the highest-ranking secretary of the Central Committee. Malenkov's name was also listed first on the newly named Presidium of the Central Committee (as the Politburo had been called since 1952). However, by March 14, he was compelled by his colleagues in the Kremlin to relinquish his post in the party apparatus. Thus, while Malenkov remained the head of government and continued to chair meetings of the Presidium, he ceded control of the Secretariat to Nikita Khrushchev who replaced him as the party's acting First Secretary.

On 26 June 1953, the troika broke up after Malenkov and other members of the Presidium had Lavrentiy Beria arrested and effectively removed from the Soviet leadership. In the aftermath of Beria's fall, powers once centralized within the MVD such as control over public roads, command over numerous paramilitary units, and a monopoly on labor camp industries were distributed throughout the government. Additionally, Malenkov moved to strengthen his position within the regime by naming several allies as deputy premiers and promoting agricultural reforms that were popular among the public. Despite Malenkov's resurgence within the Presidium, a Malenkov-Khrushchev duumvirate ultimately took form as the latter steadily increased the party's power at the expense of Soviet ministries.

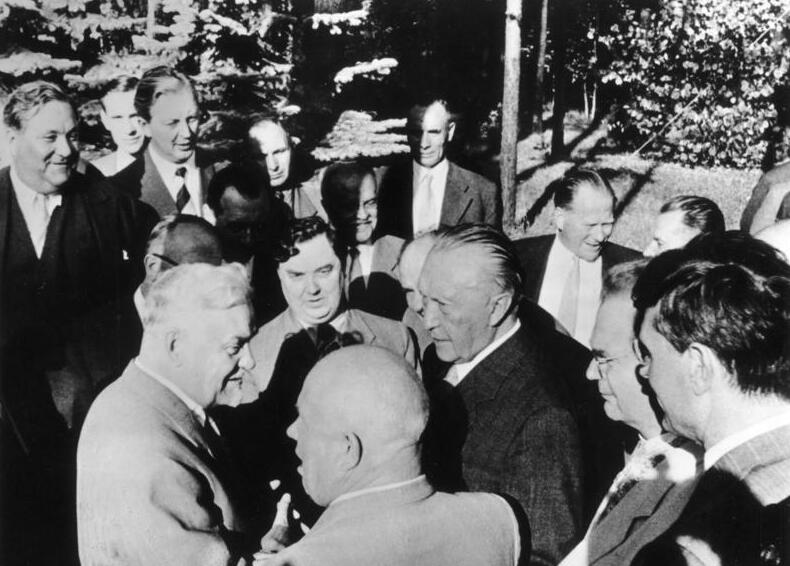
Malenkov and Khrushchev speaking with West German chancellor Konrad Adenauer alongside other members of the Soviet leadership in 1955

Malenkov retained the office of premier for two years. During this time his political activities were mixed with a power struggle within the Kremlin. After receiving a classified report from senior physicists Igor Kurchatov, Abram Alikhanov, Isaak Kikoin, and A.P. Vinogradov about the dangers of a thermonuclear war, Malenkov decided to pursue a policy of peaceful coexistence with the United States, while maintaining a minimal deterrence, declaring that "a new world war ... with modern weapons means the end of world civilization." He was later forced to reiterate that the Soviet Union would retaliate in kind against a nuclear aggression from the West after receiving sharp criticism from Khrushchev and Molotov. In debates on diplomacy he always took the peaceful line, while continuing Stalin's policy of keeping the eastern Europe countries firmly under Soviet influence.

On economic issues, Malenkov advocated refocusing the economy on production of consumer goods at the expense of heavy industry, with the goal of elevating the standards of living in the Soviet Union. Malenkov also advocated for an agriculture policy that included tax cuts for peasants, increase in the price paid to the Kolkhozes by the state for grains, and incentives for peasants to cultivate their private plots. Those policies were never fully put in place during Malenkov's premiership and duumvirate because of other party members' opposition, which saw Malenkov's focus on light industry as a "rightist deviation".

== Downfall and final years ==
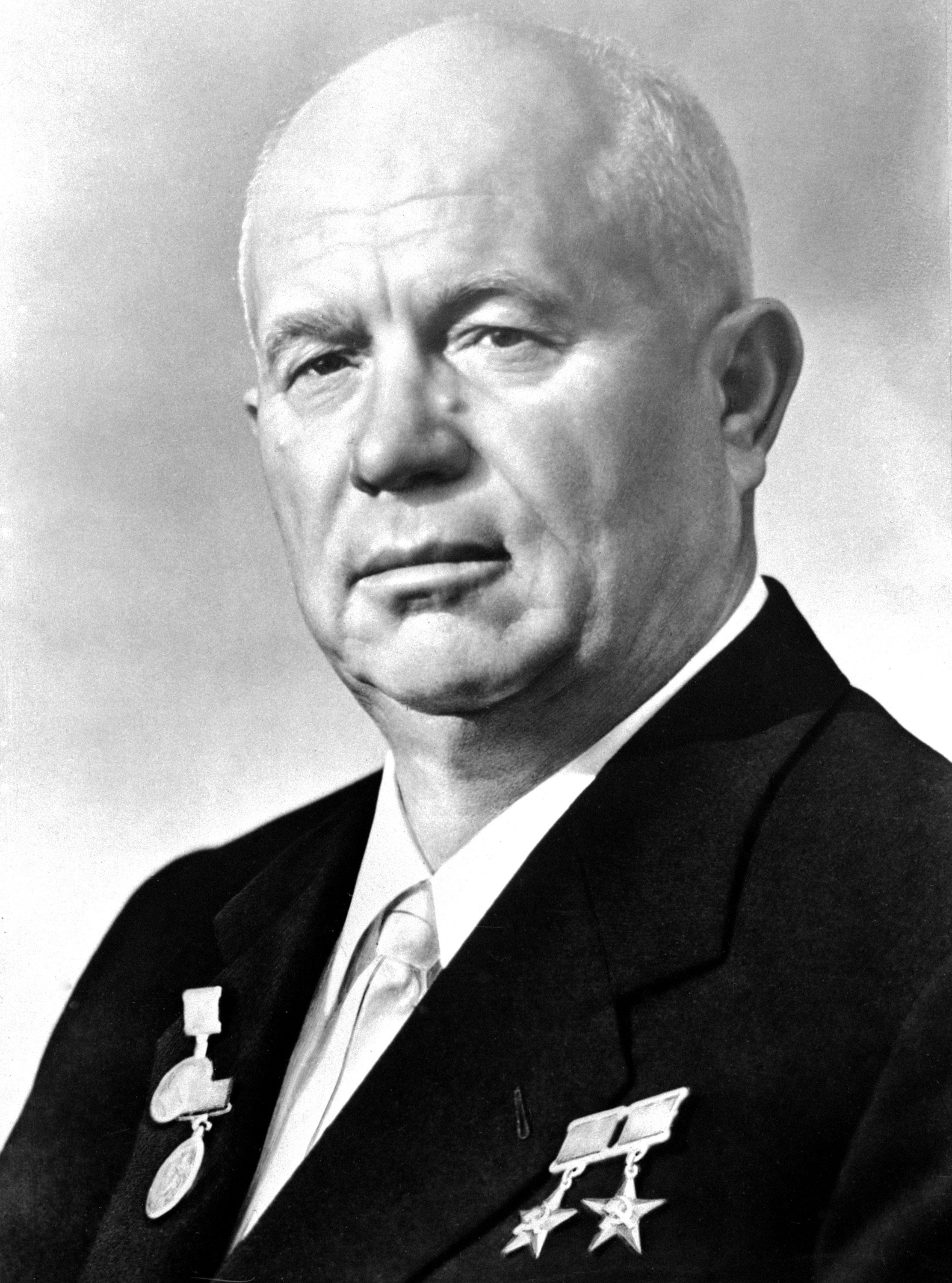
A portrait of Khrushchev at the height of his power in 1959. By this time, two years had passed since he ousted Malenkov from the Soviet leadership.

Malenkov was forced to resign in February 1955 after he was accused of abuse of power, lack of "decisiveness and experience to direct the government", emphasis on the production of consumer goods at the expense of heavy industry (which the military considered vital in a possible conflict with the West), and his close connection to Beria, who had been deposed and executed as a traitor in 1953 (despite Malenkov having taken part in Beria's downfall). His economic program of prioritizing light industry was subsequently abandoned in favor of increasing investments into heavy industry in the 1955 federal budget, but eventually adopted by Khrushchev.

For two more years, Malenkov remained a regular member of the Presidium. Together with Khrushchev, he flew to the island of Brioni (Yugoslavia) on the night of 1–2 November 1956 to inform Josip Broz Tito of the impending Soviet invasion of Hungary scheduled for 4 November.

In 1957, Malenkov organized an attempt at a coup against Khrushchev. In a dramatic standoff in the Kremlin, both Khrushchev and Georgy Zhukov, who had the backing of the Soviet Army, turned against Malenkov. Malenkov's attempt failed and he, together with two other prominent co-conspirators, Vyacheslav Molotov and Lazar Kaganovich, who were characterized by Khrushchev at an extraordinary session of the Party Central Committee as the "Anti-Party Group", were dismissed from the Politburo. Malenkov was exiled to Kazakhstan and became the manager of a hydroelectric plant in Ust'-Kamenogorsk. In November 1961, Malenkov was further expelled from the Communist Party.

After his exile and eventual expulsion from the party, Malenkov first fell into obscurity and suffered from depression from the loss of his power and quality of life. He subsequently found his demotion and dismissal a relief from the pressures of the Kremlin power struggle throughout the 1950s. In his later years, he converted to Russian Orthodoxy, as did his daughter, who has since spent part of her personal wealth building two churches in rural locations. Orthodox Church publications at the time of Malenkov's death said he had been a reader, the lowest level of Russian Orthodox clergy, and a choir singer in his final years.

== Death ==
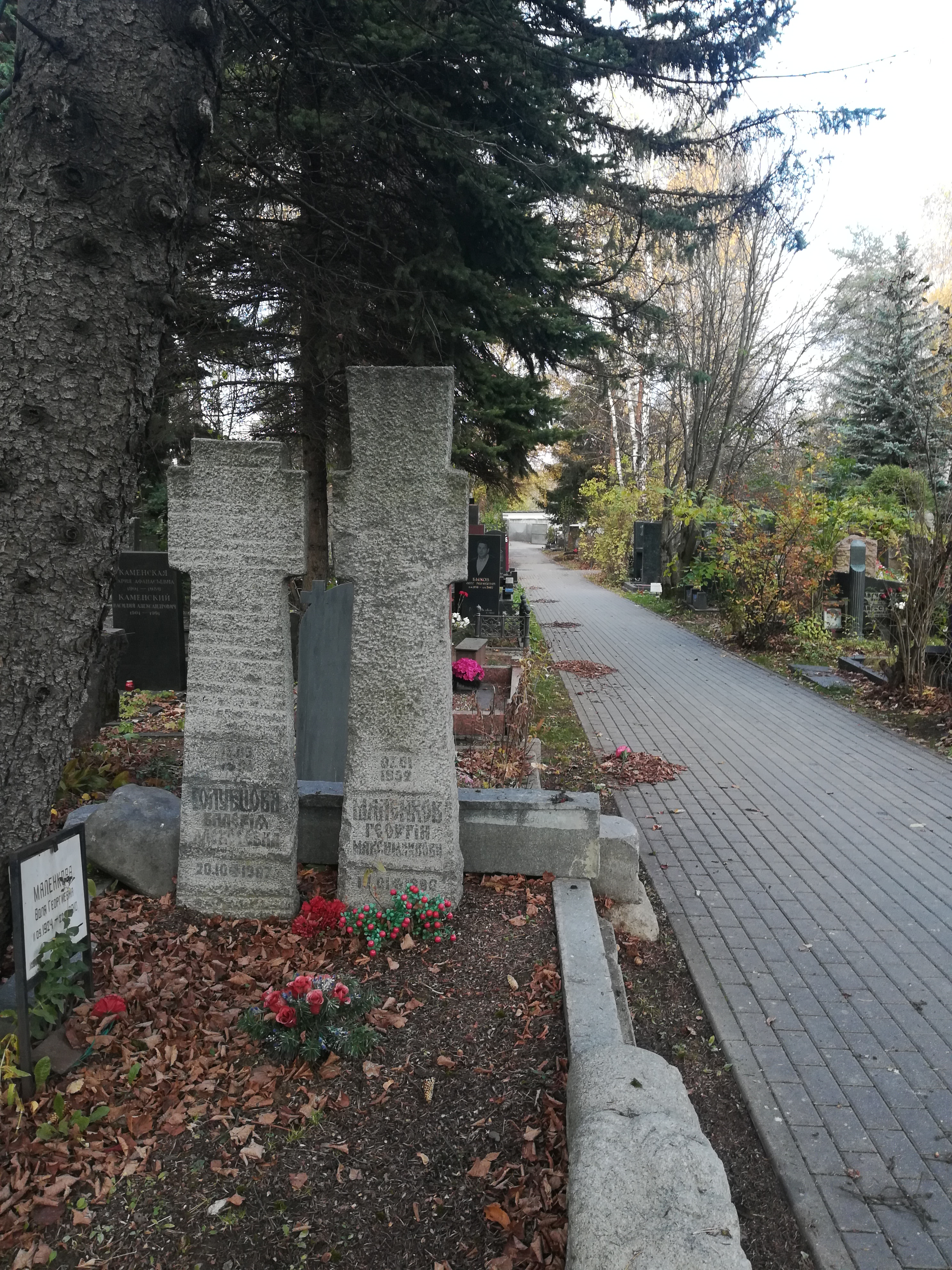
Tomb of Malenkov and domestic partner Golubtsova

In 1920, Malenkov began living together with scientist Valeriya Golubtsova, daughter of Aleksei Golubtsov, former State Councilor of the Russian Empire in Nizhny Novgorod and dean of the Imperial Cadet School. Golubtsova and Malenkov never officially registered their union and remained unregistered partners for the rest of their lives. She had a direct connection to Vladimir Lenin through her mother; one of the "Nevzorov sisters" who were apprentices of Lenin and studied together with him for years, long before the Revolution. This connection helped both Golubtsova and Malenkov in their communist career. Later Golubtsova was the director of the Moscow Power Engineering Institute, a centre for nuclear power research in USSR.

Malenkov died on 14 January 1988 in Moscow of natural causes at the age of 86, three months after the death of his partner. They are buried together at Kuntsevo Cemetery.

== Honours and awards ==
- 30 September 1943:
  - Hero of Socialist Labour
  - Order of Lenin
- 1945: Order of Lenin (second)
- 1952: Order of Lenin (third)

== Foreign assessments ==
The 1952 Time magazine cover shows Malenkov embraced by Stalin. In 1954, a delegation of the British Labour Party was in Moscow, including former Prime Minister Clement Attlee and former Secretary of State for Health Aneurin Bevan. Sir William Goodenough Hayter, British Ambassador to the Soviet Union, asked for a meeting with Nikita Khrushchev, then General Secretary of the Communist Party of the Soviet Union. Much to Hayter's surprise, not only did Khrushchev accept the proposal, but he decided to attend in the company of Vyacheslav Molotov, Anastas Mikoyan, Andrey Vyshinsky, Nikolay Shvernik, and Malenkov.

Such was the interest aroused in British political circles by this event that Sir Winston Churchill invited Sir William Hayter down to Chartwell to provide a full account of what had transpired at the meeting. Malenkov seemed "easily the most intelligent and quickest to grasp what was being said" and said "no more than he wanted to say". He was considered an "extremely agreeable neighbour at the table" and was thought to have had a "pleasant, musical voice and spoke well-educated Russian". Malenkov even recommended, quietly, that British diplomatic translator Cecil Parrott should read the novels of Leonid Andreyev, an author whose literature was at that time labeled as decadent in the USSR. Nikita Khrushchev, by contrast, struck Hayter as being "rumbustious, impetuous, loquacious, free-wheeling, and alarmingly ignorant of foreign affairs".

Hayter thought that Khrushchev seemed "incapable of grasping Bevan's line of thought", and that Malenkov had to explain matters to him in "words of one syllable".

== Portrayals ==
Peter Woodthorpe portrayed Malenkov in the 1983 satirical film Red Monarch. Jeffrey Tambor played Malenkov in the 2017 satirical film The Death of Stalin.

== Bibliography ==
- Bluth, Christoph (1992). Soviet Strategic Arms Policy Before SALT. Cambridge University Press. ISBN 978-0-521-40372-6.
- Brown, Archie (2009). The Rise and Fall of Communism. HarperCollins. ISBN 978-0-06-113879-9. Archived from the original on 18 June 2013.
- Brzezinski, Zbigniew (1967). The Soviet Bloc, Unity and Conflict. Harvard University Press. ISBN 978-0-674-82548-2.
- Central Intelligence Agency (12 September 1955). CAESAR Papers − Resignation of Malenkov (PDF) (Report). Freedom of Information Act Electronic Reading Room. Archived (PDF) from the original on 19 October 2023.
- Haslam, Jonathan (2011). Russia's Cold War: From the October Revolution to the Fall of the Wall. Yale University Press. ISBN 978-0-300-15997-4. Archived from the original on 7 October 2025.
- Kort, Michael G. (2010). The Soviet Colossus: History and Aftermath (7th ed.). M.E. Sharpe, Inc. ISBN 978-0-7656-2386-7. Archived from the original on 30 May 2024.
- Malia, Martin (2008). Soviet Tragedy: A History of Socialism in Russia. Free Press. ISBN 9781439118542.
- Marlowe, Lynn Elizabeth (2005). GED Social Studies. Research and Education Association. ISBN 978-0738601274.
- McCauley, Martin (2013). The Rise and Fall of the Soviet Union. Routledge. ISBN 978-0-582-78465-9.
- McCauley, Martin (2016). Khrushchev and the Development of Soviet Agriculture: Virgin Land Program, 1953–64. Springer. ISBN 978-1-349-03059-0.
- Paxton, John (2004). Leaders of Russia and the Soviet Union: From the Romanov Dynasty to Vladimir Putin. Taylor & Francis Group. ISBN 1-57958-132-3.
- Reshetar, John S. Jr (1989). The Soviet Polity: Government and Politics in the USSR (3rd ed.). Harper & Row. ISBN 0-06-045398-2.
- Riasanovsky, Nicholas V. (2000). A History of Russia. Oxford University Press. ISBN 0-19-512179-1.
- Rush, Myron (1965). Political Succession in the USSR. Columbia University Press.
- Service, Robert (2009). A History of Modern Russia : From Tsarism to the Twenty-First Century. Cambridge, Massachusetts: Harvard University Press. ISBN 978-0-674-03493-8.
- Shakarian, Pietro A. (2025). Anastas Mikoyan: An Armenian Reformer in Khrushchev's Kremlin. Bloomington: Indiana University Press. ISBN 978-0253073556.
- Smirnof, Yuri; Zubok, Vladislav (1994). "Nuclear Weapons after Stalin's Death: Moscow Enters the H-Bomb Age". Bulletin (4). Woodrow Wilson International Center for Scholars: 1, 14−18.
- Suny, Ronald Grigor (1998). The Soviet Experiment: Russia, the USSR, and the Successor States. Oxford University Press. ISBN 0-19-508105-6.
- Taubman, William (2003). Khrushchev: The Man and His Era. W.W. Norton & Company. ISBN 0-393-32484-2.
