= Moscow Gorky Academic Art Theatre =

Theatre in Moscow, Russia

- Московский Художественный академический театр имени М. Горького
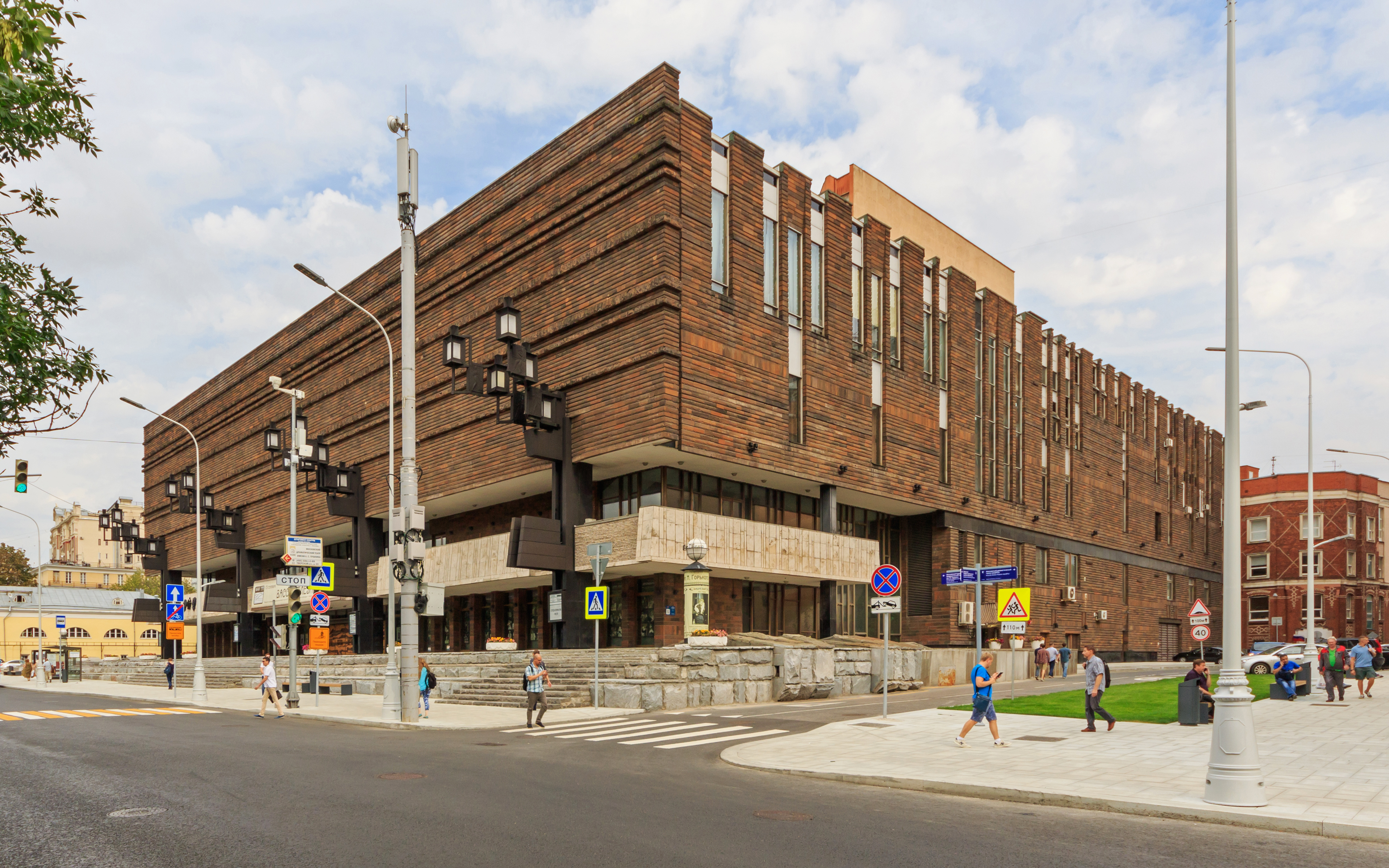
- Interactive map of Moscow Gorky Academic Art Theatre
- Address: Moscow; Russia
- Coordinates: 55°45′42″N 37°36′12″E

Construction
- Opened: 1987
- Architect: Vladimir Kubasov

Website
- art-theatre.ru

Moscow Gorky Academic Art Theatre (Russian: Московский Художественный академический театр имени М. Горького) is a drama theatre in Moscow, founded in 1987 after the division of the Moscow Art Theatre into two theatres. It is named after the Russian writer Maxim Gorky. The president — founder, former artistic director and former director — People's Artist of the USSR Tatiana Doronina. The director — Vladimir Abramovich Kekhman.

== History ==
The theatre was founded in 1987, after the Minister of Culture of the Soviet Union, Vasily Zakharov, signed Order No. 383, according to which the Moscow Art Theatre was officially divided into two theaters: the Gorky Moscow Art Theater under the direction of Tatyana Doronina and the Moscow Chekhov Art Theatre under the direction of its first artistic director Oleg Efremov. The "Doronina" Moscow Art Theater retained the official name of M. Gorky, given to the theater in 1932, and the "Efremov" one was given the name of A. P. Chekhov in 1989 (see A. P. Chekhov Moscow Art Theater).

The split of the Moscow Art Theater in 1987 was caused by a conflict of ideas about artistic activity that arose in the theater's management in 1970, after the appointment of Oleg Efremov to the post of artistic director of the Moscow Art Theater of the USSR.

The Gorky Moscow Art Theatre, often called the "Doroninsky Moscow Art Theatre" after the actress who headed the new theatre, was considered conservative.

On December 4, 2018, producer and theatre director Eduard Boyakov was appointed artistic director of the theatre. The founder of the theatre, Tatyana Doronina, was transferred to the specially created position of president of the theatre. Honored Artist of the Russian Federation Sergey Puskepalis became deputy director of the theatre for creative work, and writer and publicist Zakhar Prilepin was appointed deputy artistic director for literary work. On August 16, 2019, Sergey Puskepalis left the artistic management of the Gorky Moscow Art Theatre in connection with his appointment to the position of artistic director of the Volkov Theatre.

The executive director of the theatre from September 16, 2019 to February 2021 was Tatyana Lvovna Yaroshevskaya. Then, Oleg Stanislavovich Mikhailov served as acting director until October 27, 2021, when Vladimir Kekhman was appointed general director of the theater.
