= Pyotr Demichev =

Soviet politician (1918–2010)

- Пётр Демичев

First Deputy Chairman of the Presidium of the Supreme Soviet of the Soviet Union
- In office 18 June 1986 – 1 October 1988
- President: Andrei Gromyko
- Preceded by: Vasily Kuznetsov
- Succeeded by: Anatoly Lukyanov

Minister of Culture
- In office 14 November 1974 – 18 June 1986
- Premier: Alexei Kosygin; Nikolai Tikhonov; Nikolai Ryzhkov
- Preceded by: Ekaterina Furtseva
- Succeeded by: Vasily Zakharov

Personal details
- Born: 3 January 1918 [O.S. 21 December 1917] Kirov, Kaluga Oblast, Soviet Russia
- Died: 10 August 2010 (aged 92) Zhavoronki, Moscow Oblast, Russian Federation
- Party: Communist Party of the Soviet Union (1939–1991)
- Profession: Civil servant
- Central institution membership: 1961–1974: Member of the 22nd, 23rd & 24th Secretariat; 1964–1988: Candidate member of the 22nd, 23rd, 24th, 25th, 26th & 27th Politburo; 1959–1961: Member of the Bureau of the CPSU Central Committee for the Russian SFSR; Other political offices held: 1945–1950: Head of department, secretary of the Soviet District Committee of the All-Union Communist Party of Bolsheviks of Moscow; 1950–1952: Deputy Head of the Department of Propaganda and Agitation of the Moscow City Committee of the All-Union Communist Party of Bolsheviks; 1956–1958: Secretary of the Moscow Regional Party Committee; 1959–1960: First Secretary of the Moscow Regional Party Committee; 1958–1959: Administrator of Affairs of the Council of Ministers; 1960–1962: First Secretary of the Moscow City Party Committee

Pyotr Nilovich Demichev (Russian: Пётр Ни́лович Де́мичев; 3 January 1918 [O.S. 21 December 1917] – 10 August 2010) was a Soviet politician. He was deputy Chairman of the Presidium of the Supreme Soviet from 1986 to 1988 and Minister of Culture from 1974 to 1986. He was a deputy Politburo member from 1964 until his retirement in 1988. He was considered to be a "Communist Party ideologist" with little sympathy for liberal movements within the Soviet Union.

== Biography ==
He was born on January 3, 1918 [O.S. December 21, 1917] in the village of Pesochnya, Kaluga province (now Kaluga region) in a working-class family.

In 1937-1944 he served in the Red Army, he took part in military operations in Mongolia (1939-1940).

After graduating from school, he studied at a mechanical engineering college. In 1937, he entered the Military Academy of Chemical Defense named after Kliment Voroshilov. He was graduated from the D. Mendeleev University of Chemical Technology of Russia in 1944. In 1944-1945 he was engaged in scientific and pedagogical activities at the Moscow Institute of Chemical Technology.

=== Party career ===
He joined the CPSU in 1939, he was the head of department, secretary of the Soviet District Committee of the All-Union Communist Party of Bolsheviks of Moscow. In 1950, he was Deputy head of the department of Propaganda and Agitation of the Moscow City Committee of the All-Union Communist Party of Bolsheviks.

In 1953 he graduated from the Higher Party School under the CPSU Central Committee (in absentia). At the HPS, he worked on a dissertation on European philosophy of the 19th century, but he did not complete it. In 1965, he replaced Leonid Ilyichev as Secretary of the CPSU Central Committee, in charge of issues of ideology, history and culture. Information about his activities during this period is contradictory. According to Vasily Ogryzko, Demichev “was considered a member of Alexander Shelepin’s team ,” while “in his heart he supported the Russian party in literature and art and terribly disliked liberals”. Sharing some of the views of the “ soil people ” he patronized Ilya Glazunov and Vladimir Soloukhin. Demichev, on the contrary, set as his goal “the fight against hidden Stalinists,” and being directly responsible for the Propaganda Department of the Central Committee, he gradually eliminated almost all “hidden Stalinists” and Russian nationalists. In 1974, he was became the Minister of Culture of the Soviet Union from 1974–1986, later he became the First Deputy Chairman of the Presidium of the Supreme Soviet after Kuznetsov retired in 1986. He was relieved all of his duties in 1988. He was still a member of the CPSU until the dissolution of the USSR.

== Post-soviet life and death ==
After the dissolution of the USSR, Demichev lived in Moscow with his family. He died on August 10, 2010 from natural causes in the village of Zhavoronki, Odintsovsky district in Moscow at the age of 92. He was buried at the Znamensky cemetery.

== Awards ==
Order of Lenin, four times (1963, 1968, 1971 & 1988)
Order of the October Revolution (2 January 1978)
Order of the Patriotic War, 1st degree (23 April 1985)
Order of the Red Banner of Labor (30 January 1957)
Medal "For Labour Valour" (25 December 1959)
Jubilee Medal "Forty Years of Victory in the Great Patriotic War 1941–1945" (23 April 1985)
Medal "For Strengthening of Brotherhood in Arms" (2 June 1980)
Order of Merit of the Republic of Poland (20 April 1985)
