= Furtsev =

Furtsev (Russian: Фурцев) is a Russian masculine surname, its feminine counterpart is Furtseva. Notable people with the surname include:

- Leonid Furtsev (born 1999), Russian football player
- Yekaterina Furtseva (1910–1974), Soviet politician
