= Nikolai Ignatov =

Soviet politician (1902–1966)

- Николай Игнатов
- Ignatov in 1958

Chairman of the Presidium of the Supreme Soviet of the Russian SFSR
- In office 20 December 1962 – 14 November 1966
- Premier: Gennady Voronov
- Preceded by: Nikolai Organov
- Succeeded by: Mikhail Yasnov
- In office 16 April 1959 – 26 November 1959
- Premier: Dmitry Polyansky
- Preceded by: Mikhail Tarasov
- Succeeded by: Nikolai Organov

Deputy Premier of the Soviet Union
- In office 4 May 1960 – 26 December 1962
- Premier: Nikita Khrushchev

Candidate member of the 20th Presidium
- In office 29 June 1957 – 16 October 1961

Member of the 19th, 20th Secretariat
- In office 16 October 1952 – 5 March 1953
- In office 17 December 1957 – 4 May 1960

Personal details
- Born: 16 May [O.S. 3 May] 1902 Tishanskaya, Don Host Oblast, Russian Empire
- Died: 14 November 1966 (aged 64) Moscow, Russian SFSR Soviet Union
- Party: Communist Party of the Soviet Union (1924–1966)
- Profession: Civil servant

Nikolai Grigoryevich Ignatov (Russian: Никола́й Григо́рьевич Игна́тов; 16 May [O.S. 3 May] 1902 – 14 November 1966) was a Soviet politician during the 1950s and 1960s who served as the Chairman of the Presidium of the Supreme Soviet of the Russian Soviet Federative Republic briefly in 1959 and again from 1962 until his death.

== Biography ==
Ignatov was born in the village Tishanskaya of Donskaya Oblast (now Volgograd Oblast) in a family of a Russian carpenter. Since 1915 he started working as a carpenter too. In 1917, after the October Revolution, he joined the Red Guards, then served in the Red Army in 1918–1921. In 1921, he enlisted in the OGPU, and was based on Rostov-on-Don first, then in 1923–1932 in Central Asia, where he helped suppress the Basmachi movement. After completing his secondary education in 1932–1934, he worked as a Communist Party representative at a factory in Leningrad. In 1937, he achieved rapid promotion, as a result of the Great Purge. Early in the year he was appointed first party secretary in one of the suburbs of Leningrad, where the regional party boss was Andrei Zhdanov.

In August 1937, Ignatov was appointed a secretary of the Communist Party of Kuybyshev – evidently with instructions to undermine the local party boss, Pavel Postyshev. When the Central Committee of the Soviet communist party (CPSU) held a plenary session in Moscow, in January 1938, Ignatov was allowed to attend and speak, although he was not a member, and launch a personal attack on Postyshev, who was a Central Committee member, and an alternate member of the Politburo. During an angry exchange, Postyshev accused Ignatov several times of lying. In March 1938, Ignatov replaced Postyshev – who was arrested and shot – as first party secretary in Kuybyshev, and in March 1939, he was elected to the Central Committee, but at the 18th party conference of the CPSU in February 1941, he was singled out by Georgy Malenkov – Zhdanov's rival – for his failure to increase agricultural output in Kuybyshev, after he had ordered the return one third of the collected crops to farmers, to motivate them in the collective agriculture. As an added humiliation, he was made to stand up so that everyone could see him while he was attacked. He was removed from his post in Kyubyshev, and from the Central Committee, and demoted to the post of head of a department of the regional communist party in Oryol Oblast.

During World War II, Ignatov organised partisan resistance in Oryol while the city was under German occupation. In July 1944, he was appointed First Secretary of the Oryol Communist Party, but lost this post in November 1948, soon after the death of his patron, Zhdanov. Then, in March 1949 – November 1952 he took the equivalent party position in Krasnodar Krai. He received a sudden promotion in October 1952, when his membership of the Central Committee was restored, and he was appointed a secretary of the Central Committee and a member of the Presidium, the new name for the Politburo - but was sacked in March 1953, immediately after the death of Joseph Stalin.

In April 1953, Ignatov was appointed Second Secretary of the Leningrad party committee, but was removed after only six months. In 1954–57, he was the regional party boss, first in Voronezh, then Gorky (Nizhy Novgorod). On 6 May 1957, the central Communist newspaper Pravda published an article where he proposed to reorganize the Soviet economy and generally supported the similar ideas of Nikita Khrushchev. During the next month, he was one of the most active defenders of Khrushchev during the well-organized attempt by Malenkov, Molotov and Kaganovich to demote him within the party. Khrushchev repaid for this by promoting Ignatov to the Presidium of the Supreme Soviet, as early as in December 1957, bypassing the usually required candidate stage, and reappointing him a Secretary of the Central Committee.

With his background as former OGPU officer, Ignatov apparently formed an alliance with the head of the KGB, Ivan Serov, arousing the suspicion of Khrushchev's second in command, Aleksey Kirichenko, the party secretary with oversight over the security services, who complained to the Presidium that "several times I looked for Serov and found him with Ignatov" – which was "incomprehensible." In April 1959, soon after Serov had been sacked, Ignatov was transferred to the ceremonial position of chairman of the Presidium of the Supreme Soviet of Russia, but seven months later, after Kirichenko had been abruptly sacked, he was reinstated as a Secretary of the Central Committee, only to be shifted in May 1960 to a lesser job of Deputy Chairman of the USSR Council of Ministers, responsible for agriculture, and subsequently removed from the Presidium. In December 1962, he resumed his former post as Chairman of the RSFSR Supreme Soviet. In this capacity, he started traveling around the Soviet Union and personally persuading local party leaders against Khrushchev. He hoped in this way to gain support of the incoming party leader, Leonid Brezhnev, but failed. In 1966, while visiting Chile, he fell ill with an unknown viral infection and died shortly afterwards.

Ignatov was awarded with the honorary title Hero of Socialist Labour, as well as with the Order of Lenin (three times), Order of the Red Banner of Labour and Order of the Patriotic War of the 1st degree. In recognition of his achievements before the Communist Party, he was buried in the Kremlin Wall Necropolis in the Red Square.
