= Alexandre Marine =

Russian-born actor-director-playwright (born 1958)

- Born: September 30, 1958 (age 67); Krasnoyarsk, Soviet Union (now Russia)
- Other names: Александр Валентинович Марин, Alexander Marin
- Occupations: Actor, director, playwright
- Years active: 1979 – present

Alexandre Marine (Russian: Александр Валентинович Марин; born September 30, 1958) is a Russian-born actor, theatre director, and playwright. He spent many years based in Montreal, Canada. He has also appeared in several Russian films.

== Early life and education ==
Alexandre Marine was born on September 30, 1958, in Krasnoyarsk, Siberia, Soviet Union.

== Career ==
Marine began his career as an actor at Oleg Tabakov's theatre (commonly known as the Tabakerka), where he had his directorial debut, later becoming a staff director at the theatre.

His award-winning productions include "The Blue Rose" (Special Jury Prize at Amurskaya Osen' in Blagoveshensk), "...the itsy bitsy spider..." (Best of Baltimore, 2010), "Marie Stuart" (Best Montreal production, 2007–2008 season) and "Amadeus" (Best English-language production, 2006–2007 season)

He is based in Montreal.

== Recognition and honours ==
On April 23, 1993, he was recognized by the Russian government as a Distinguished Artist of the Russian Federation.

== Select credits as stage director ==
- 2015: "The Tempest.Variations" translated from English by Alexandre Marine, Tabakov Theatre, Moscow, Russia
- 2015: "KNOCK: A Journey to a Strange Country" adapted by Alexandre Marine and Boris Zilberman, Lost & Found Project, New York City, New York
- 2013: "COVERS" by Ruvym Gilman and Boris Zilberman, Lost & Found Project, New York City, New York
- 2012: "Sister Hope" based on Alexander Volodin's play "Elder Sister," Tabakov Theatre, Moscow, Russia
- 2012: "Waiting for the Barbarians" adapted from J. M. Coetzee's novel Waiting for the Barbarians, Baxter Theatre Centre, Cape Town, South Africa
- 2012: "Marriage 2.0", adapted from Anton Chekhov's short stories and one act plays, Tabakov Theatre, Moscow, Russia
- 2011: "The Blue Rose", adapted from Tennessee Williams' The Glass Menagerie, VIP-Theatre, Moscow, Russia
- 2010: Vassa, adapted from Maxim Gorky, Théâtre du Rideau Vert, Montréal
- 2009: "...the itsy bitsy spider...", adapted from Fyodor Dostoevsky's The Possessed, Studio Six Theater Company, New York City (with performances in Bridgeport, CT, Baltimore, MD and Montreal, Quebec, Canada)
- 2009: "A Streetcar Named Desire" by Tennessee Williams, Théâtre du Rideau Vert, Montréal, Canada
- 2009: "The Swan" by Elizabeth Egloff, Premiere, Moscow, Russia
- 2009: "Le Boeuf sur le toit", music by Darius Milhaud, based on a scenario by Jean Cocteau, I Musici de Montréal, Montréal, Canada
- 2008: "Dangerous Liaisons" by Christopher Hampton, at the Leonor and Alvin Segal Theatre at the Segal Centre for Performing Arts, Montréal, Canada
- 2008: "The Postman Always Rings Twice", a 2008 play based on the novel by James M. Cain, Imperiya Zvezd, and, later, Master Theatre, Moscow, Russia
- 2008: "Hay Fever" by Noël Coward, Moscow Art Theatre, Moscow, Russia
- 2007: "The Emigrants" by Slawomir Mrozek, Théâtre Deuxième Réalité, Montréal, Canada
- 2007: "Marie Stuart" by Friedrich Schiller, Théâtre du Rideau Vert, Montréal, Canada
- 2006: "The Old Maid and the Thief" by Gian Carlo Menotti, I Musici de Montréal, Montréal, Canada
- 2005: "Antiformalist Rayok" by Dmitri Shostakovich, I Musici de Montréal, Montréal, Canada
- 2004: "Macbeth.com based on Shakespeare's play, Starvin' Kitty Productions, New York, NY
- 2004: "Antony and Cleopatra" by Shakespeare, ACRON Theatre, Tokyo, Japan
- 2003: "Arcadia by Tom Stoppard, Tabakov Theatre, Moscow, Russia
- 2003: "The Seagull 2288" based on Chekhov's play, ArcLight Theatre, New York, NY
- 2002: "Duck Hunting" by Aleksandr Vampilov, Moscow Art Theatre, Moscow, Russia
- 2001: "The Beatles Babes" by Sergei Volynets, Moscow Art Theatre, Moscow, Russia
- 2000: "Mother Courage" by Bertolt Brecht, Hayuza Theatre, Tokyo, Japan
- 1999: "Hamlet" by Shakespeare, Théâtre Deuxième Réalité, Montréal, Canada
- 1997: "Sublimation of Love" by Aldo De Benedetti, Tabakov Theatre, Moscow
- 1996: "We" adapted from Yevgeny Zamyatin's eponymous novel, Théâtre Deuxième Réalite, Montréal, Canada
- 1980: "Dr. Faustus" by Goethe, Tabakov Studio, Moscow, Soviet Union

== Select credits as stage actor ==
- 2015: Prospero in "The Tempest.Variations" based on Shakespeare's The Tempest, Tabakov Theatre, Moscow, Russia
- 2007: Ensemble in "12" based on the works of Russian poets during the Silver Age of Russian Poetry, Théâtre Deuxième Réalité, Montréal, Canada
- 2004: Semyon Podsekalnikov in Nikolai Erdman's "The Suicide", Théâtre Deuxième Réalité, Montréal, Canada
- 1994: Nikolay Ivanovich in "Mechanical Piano" based on Chekhov's early works, Tabakov Theatre, Moscow, Russia
- 1991: Raskolnikov in Dostoevsky's "Crime and Punishment," Theatre Atelier, Moscow, Soviet Union
- 1989: Khlestakov in Gogol's "The Inspector General," Tabakov Theatre, Moscow, Soviet Union
- 1988: Epstein in Neil Simon's "Biloxi Blues," Tabakov Theatre, Moscow, Soviet Union
- 1983: Alan Strang in Peter Shaffer's Equus (play), Pushkin Theatre, Moscow, Soviet Union
- 1979: Longnose in "Two Arrows," Tabakov Studio, Moscow, Soviet Union
