= Moscow Art Theatre =

Theatre company

Coordinates: 55°45′36″N 37°36′48″E

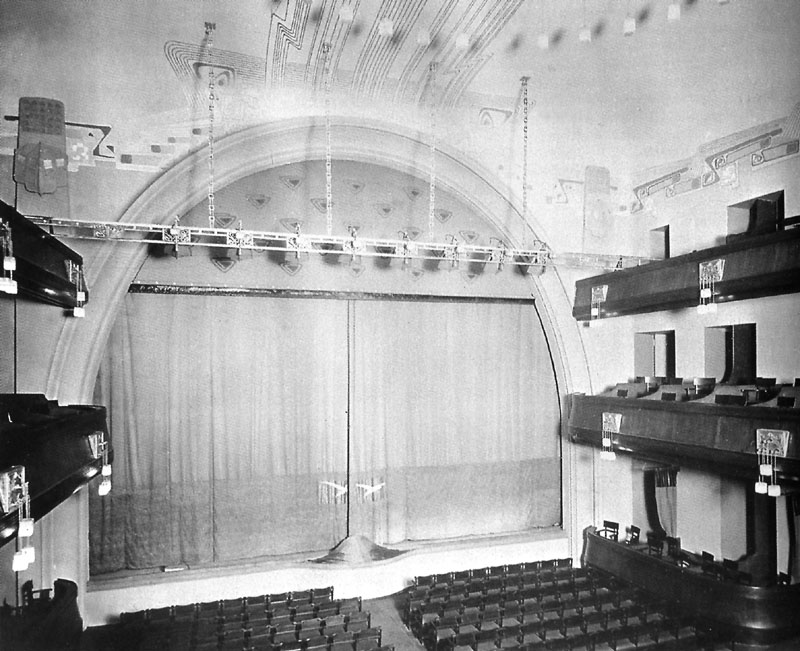
Interior of the "Old" MAT in Kamergersky Lane, originally Lianozov Theatre, as rebuilt in 1900–1903 by Fyodor Schechtel with contribution by Anna Golubkina and Ivan Fomin.

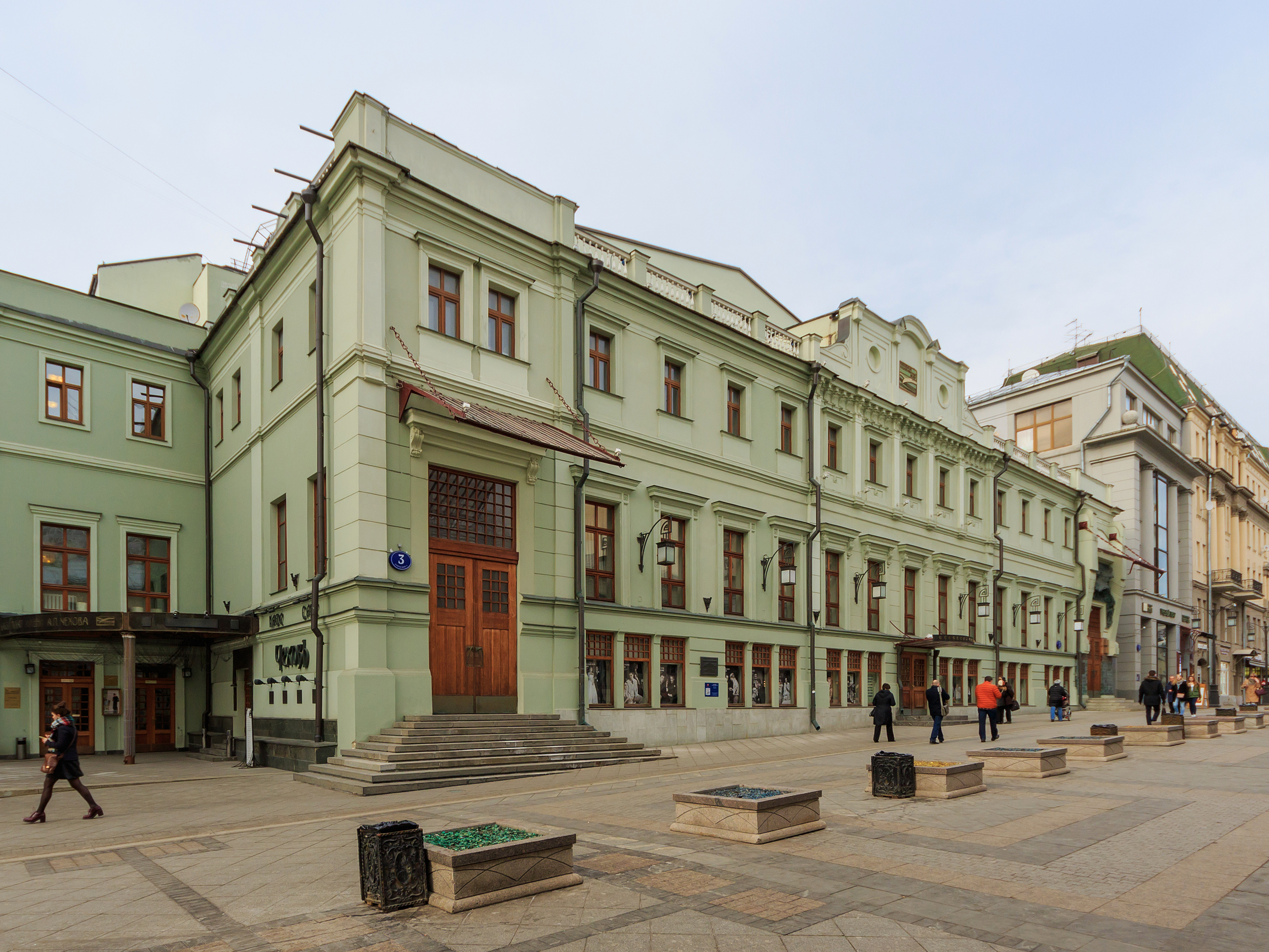
The Chekhov Moscow Art Theatre today (Kamergersky Lane, exterior by Fyodor Schechtel).

The Moscow Art Theatre (or MAT; Russian: Московский Художественный академический театр (МХАТ), Moskovskiy Hudojestvenny Akademicheskiy Teatr (MHAT)) was a theatre company in Moscow. It was founded in 1898 (128 years ago) by the seminal Russian theatre practitioner Konstantin Stanislavski, together with the playwright and director Vladimir Nemirovich-Danchenko. It was conceived as a venue for naturalistic theatre, in contrast to the melodramas that were Russia's dominant form of theatre at the time. The theatre, the first to regularly put on shows implementing Stanislavski's system, proved hugely influential in the acting world and in the development of modern American theatre and drama.

It was officially renamed the Gorky Moscow Art Theatre in 1932. In 1987, the theatre split into two troupes, the Moscow Gorky Academic Art Theatre and the Moscow Chekhov Art Theatre.

== Beginnings ==
At the end of the 19th-century, Stanislavski and Nemirovich-Danchenko both wanted to reform Russian theatre to high-quality art that was available to the general public. They set about creating a private theatre over which they had total control (as opposed to trying to reform the government-operated Maly Theatre, a move which would have given them far less artistic freedom). On 22 June 1897, the two men met for the first time at the Slavyanski Bazar for a lunch that started at 2 PM and did not end until 8 AM the next morning.

Their differences proved to be complementary, and they agreed to initially divide power over the theatre, with Nemirovich in charge of the literary decisions and Stanislavski in charge of all production decisions. Stanislavski interviewed all his actors, making sure they were hard working and devoted as well as talented. He made them live together in common housing for months at a time to foster community and trust, which he believed would raise the quality of their performances. Stanislavski's system, in which he trained actors via the acting studios he founded as part of the theatre, became central to every production the theatre put on. The system played a huge influence in the development of method acting.

Stanislavski and Danchenko's initial goal of having an “open theatre,” one that anyone could afford to attend, was quickly destroyed when they could neither obtain adequate funding from private investors, nor from the Moscow City Council.

== History ==
The Theatre's first season included works by Aleksey Tolstoy (Tsar Fyodor Ioannovich), Henrik Ibsen, and William Shakespeare, but it wasn't until it staged Anton Chekhov's four major works, beginning with its production of The Seagull in 1898, with Stanislavski in the role of Trigorin, that the theatre achieved fame.

After Chekhov's death in 1904, the theatre experienced a huge changeover; Chekhov had envisioned fellow playwright and friend Maxim Gorki as his successor as the Theatre's leading dramatist, but Nemirovich and Stanislavski's reaction to his play Summerfolk was unenthusiastic, causing Gorki to leave. He took with him Savva Morozov, one of the theatre's main investors at the time.

Now in dire straits, the theatre decided to accept invitations to go on an international tour in 1906, which started in Berlin and included Dresden, Frankfurt, Prague, and Vienna. The tour was a huge success, gaining the theatre international acclaim. However, the sudden change in fortune did not completely quell the company's internal strife; Stanislavski appointed friends to the theatre's management without consulting Nemirovich and opened studios attached to the theatre where he began to implement his acting system, cementing Nemirovich's fears that the theatre was becoming a mere extension of Stanislavski's own ideas and work. The tension between the two led Stanislavski to abandon his duties as a board member and to relinquish all his power over policy decisions.

The theatre continued to thrive after the October Revolution of 1917 and was one of the foremost state-supported theatres of the Soviet Union, with an extensive repertoire of leading Russian and Western playwrights. Although several revolutionary groups saw it as an irrelevant marker of pre-revolutionary culture, the theatre was initially granted support by Vladimir Lenin, a frequent patron of the Art Theatre himself. Mikhail Bulgakov wrote several plays for the MAT and satirised the organisation mercilessly in his Theatrical Novel. Isaac Babel's Sunset was also performed there during the 1920s. A significant number of Moscow Art Theatre's actors were awarded the prestigious title of People's Artist of the USSR. Many actors became nationally known and admired thanks to their film roles. However, the Civil War saw many of the theatre's actors being cut off from Moscow, and the support it received from the government diminished under Lenin's New Economic Policy. The subsidies it had come to rely on were withdrawn and the theatre was forced to survive on its own profits. By 1923, the MAT was in $25,000 debt.

The theatre experienced further blows through the end of the 1930s. Stanislavski's heart attack onstage during a production of Three Sisters in 1928 led to his almost complete withdrawal from the theatre, while the Stalinist climate began to suppress artistic expression and controlled more and more what could be performed. A "red director" was appointed to the management by the government to ensure that the MAT's activities were not counter-revolutionary and that they served the Communist cause. As Russia began a period of rapid industrialization, so too was the MAT encouraged to increase production at the expense of quality, with more and more hastily produced plays going up each season. Plays had to be officially approved, and the Theatre's artistic integrity started to decline.

The theatre was officially renamed The Gorky Moscow Art Theatre in 1932. Desperate not to lose support, Stanislavski tried to appease Stalin by accepting his political limitations on what could be performed while retaining his devotion to naturalistic theatre. As a result, the mid-20th century incarnation of the Moscow Art Theatre took a stylistic turn towards Socialist Realism, which would affect its productions for decades.

It was not until autumn of 1970 that Oleg Yefremov, an actor, producer, and former student of the Moscow Art Theatre Studios who wanted Russia to once again be a major contender in the theatre world, took over control of the theatre and began to reform it. By the time he arrived to save it, the company was made up of only 150 actors, many of whom were out of practice. Yefremov began to reinstate Stanislavski's traditions, including emphasizing the importance of the studio and of the system, as well as interviewing every single candidate with special emphasis and attention placed on work ethic.

In 1987, the theatre split into two troupes: the Chekhov Moscow Art Theatre (artistic director Oleg Yefremov) and the Gorky Moscow Art Theatre (artistic director Tatiana Doronina).

In 2024 the Moscow Art Theater School is one of the leading Russian universities in the art of drama and more.

== Artistic directors ==
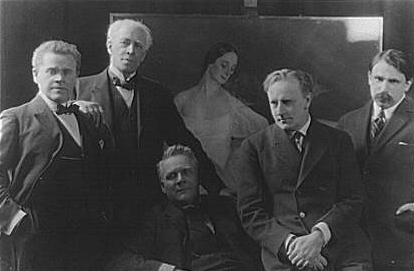
From left to right: Ivan Moskvin, Konstantin Stanislavski, Feodor Chaliapin, Vasili Kachalov, Saveli Sorine, in the US in 1923.

- Konstantin Stanislavski (artistic director until 1934) and Vladimir Nemirovich-Danchenko (executive director and later artistic director until his death in 1943)
- Nikolai Khmelyov (artistic director since 1943 until his death in 1945) and Ivan Moskvin (executive director since 1943 until his death in 1946)
- Mikhail Kedrov (since 1946 until 1949, then chief director until 1955 when the post was abolished)
- Artistic council of the theatre (since 1949 until 1955)
- Viktor Stanitsyn, Boris Livanov, Mikhail Kedrov, and Vladimir Bogomolov (since 1955 until 1970)
- Oleg Yefremov (since 1970 until the troupe was split in 1987)

== Notable actors ==
- Alla Nazimova
- Aleksey Batalov (1953–1957)
- Serafima Birman (1911–1924)
- Yuri Bogatyryov (1977–1989)
- Richard Boleslawski (1908–1914)
- Michael Chekhov (1912–1928)
- Aleksei Dikiy (1910–1928)
- Boris Dobronravov (1918–1949)
- Tatiana Doronina (1972–1987)
- Sofya Giatsintova (1901–1924)
- Kira Golovko (1938–1950, 1957–1985, 1994–2007)
- Alexey Gribov (1924–1974)
- Vasily Kachalov (1900–1948)
- Alexander Kalyagin (1971–1991)
- Konstantin Khabensky (since 2003)
- Yevgeniya Khanayeva (1947–1987)
- Nikolai Khmelyov (1924–1945)
- Olga Knipper (1898–1950)
- Alisa Koonen (1906–1913)
- Anatoli Ktorov (1933–1980)
- Tatyana Lavrova (1959–2007)
- Leonid Leonidov (1903–1943)
- Boris Livanov (1924–1970)
- Vsevolod Meyerhold (1898–1902)
- Irina Miroshnichenko (since 1965)
- Ivan Moskvin (1898–1946)
- Andrey Myagkov (1977–2013)
- Vyacheslav Nevinny (1959–2009)
- Boris Plotnikov (2002–2020)
- Alla Pokrovskaya (2004–2019)
- Andrei Popov (1973–1983)
- Mark Prudkin (1924–1987)
- Vsevolod Sanayev (1937–1943)
- Iya Savvina (1977–2011)
- Innokenty Smoktunovsky (1976–1994)
- Viktor Stanitsyn (1924–1976)
- Angelina Stepanova (1924–1987)
- Oleg Tabakov (1983–2018)
- Alla Tarasova (1924–1973)
- Mikhail Tarkhanov (1922–1948)
- Akim Tamiroff (?–1927)
- Natalya Tenyakova (since 1988)
- Yevgeny Vakhtangov (1911–1919)
- Anastasiya Vertinskaya (1980–1989)
- Mikhail Yanshin (1924–1976)
- Oleg Yefremov (1970–2000)
- Yevgeny Yevstigneyev (1971–1988)
- Anastasia Zuyeva (1924–1986)

== List of productions ==
What follows is a full chronological list of MAT productions

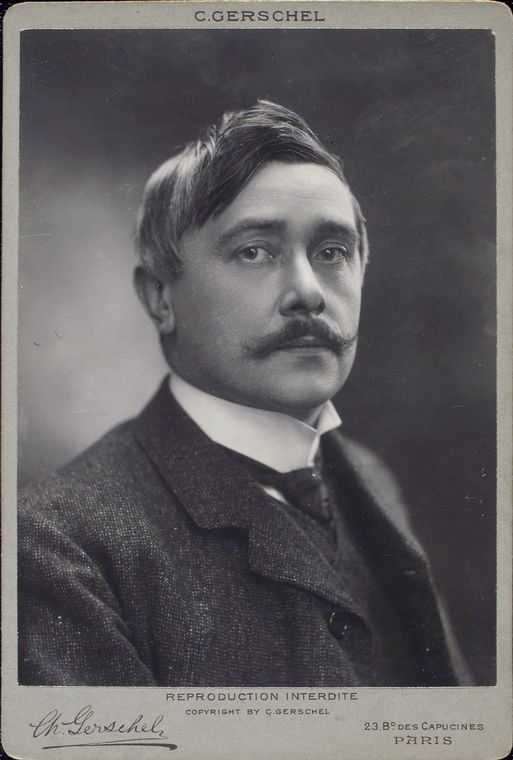
Playwright Maurice Maeterlinck, whose play The Blue Bird, made its worldwide debut at the theatre

=== 1898 ===
- Tsar Fyodor Ioannovich, by Aleksey Konstantinovich Tolstoy
- The Sunken Bell, by Gerhart Hauptmann
- The Merchant of Venice, by William Shakespeare
- The Seagull, by Anton Chekhov

=== 1899 ===
- Antigone, by Sophocles
- Hedda Gabler, by Henrik Ibsen
- The Death of Ivan the Terrible, by Aleksey Konstantinovich Tolstoy
- Twelfth Night, by William Shakespeare
- Drayman Henschel, by Gerhart Hauptmann
- Uncle Vanya, by Anton Chekhov
- Lonely People, by Gerhart Hauptmann

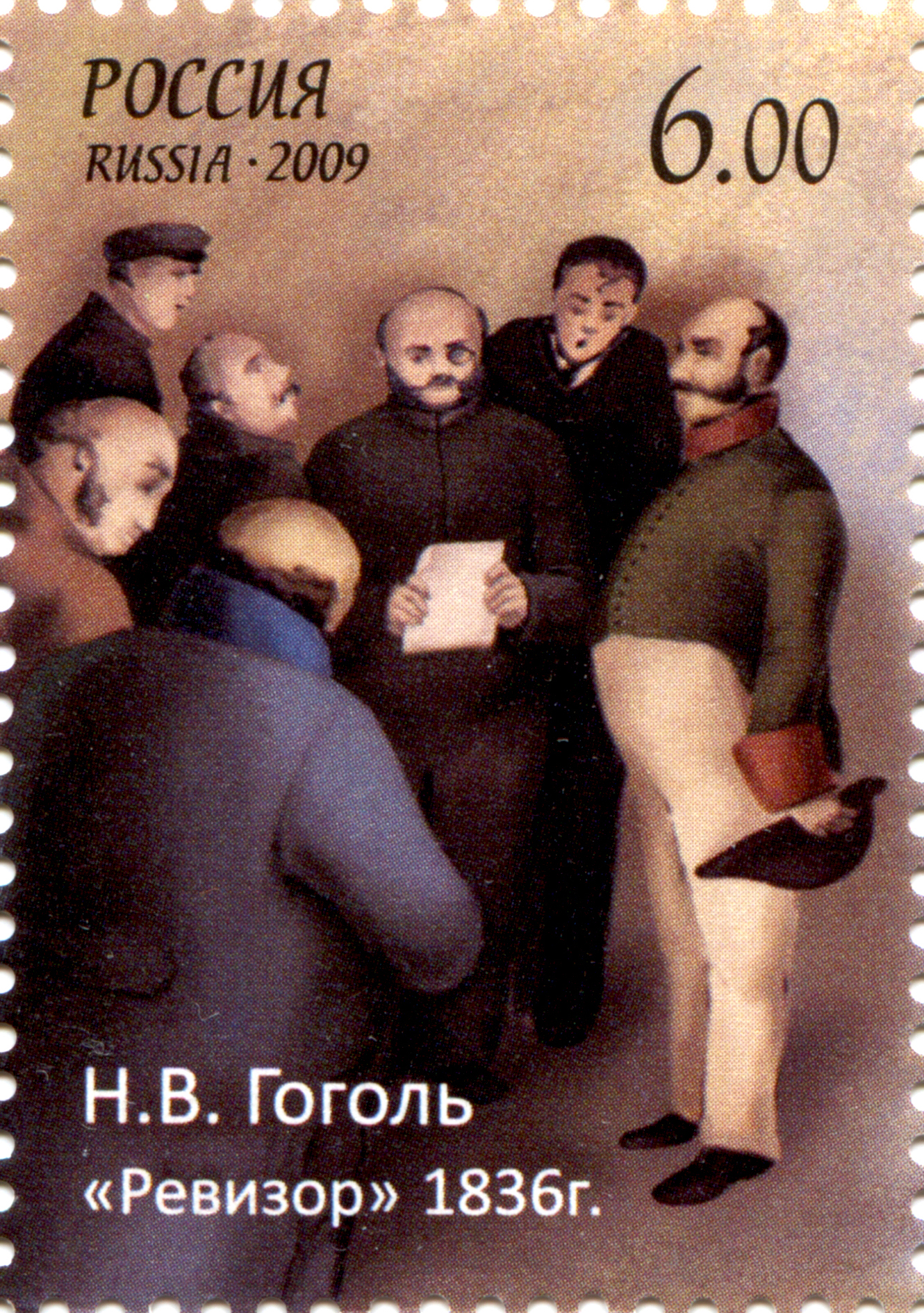
A Russian Stamp depicting The Government Inspector, by Nikolai Gogol, which played at MAT

=== 1900 ===
- The Snow Maiden, by Alexander Ostrovsky
- An Enemy of the People, by Henrik Ibsen
- When We Dead Awaken, by Henrik Ibsen

=== 1901 ===
- Three Sisters, by Anton Chekhov
- The Wild Duck, by Henrik Ibsen
- Michael Kramer, by Gerhart Hauptmann
- In my Dreams, by Vladimir Nemirovich-Danchenko

=== 1902 ===
- The Philistines, by Maxim Gorky
- The Power of Darkness, by Leo Tolstoy
- The Lower Depths, by Maxim Gorky

=== 1903 ===
- The Pillars of Society, by Henrik Ibsen
- Julius Caesar, by William Shakespeare

=== 1904 ===
- The Cherry Orchard, by Anton Chekhov
- Ivanov, by Anton Chekhov

=== 1905 ===
- Children of the Sun, Maxim Gorky

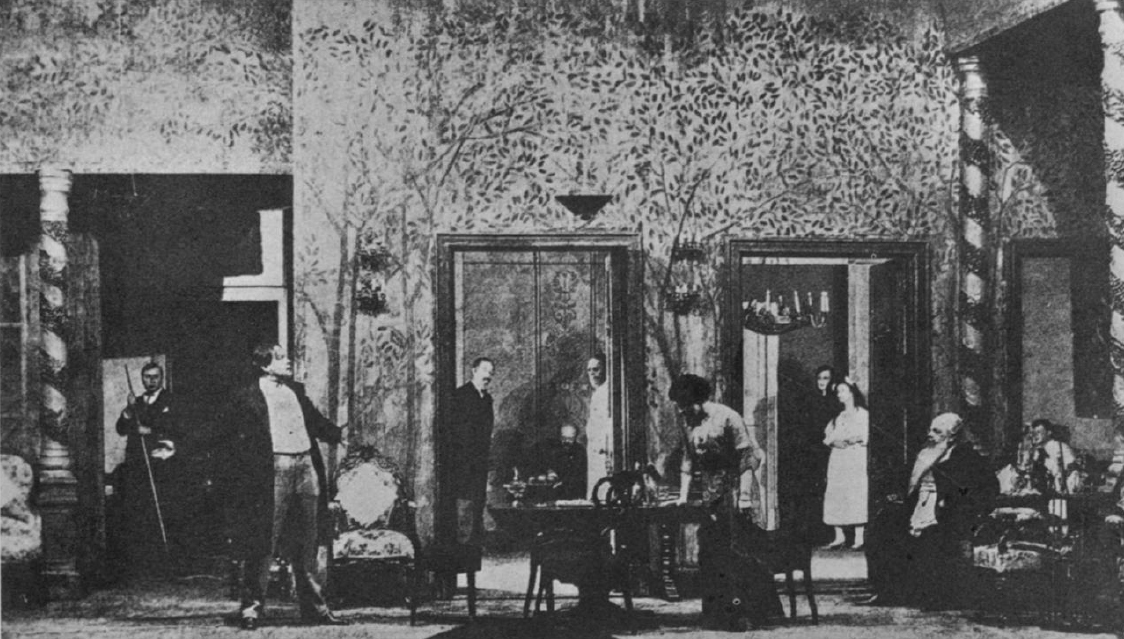
A scene from Chekhovs The Cherry Orchard

=== 1906 ===
- Woe from Wit, by Aleksander Griboyedov (reproduced in 1914)
- Brand, by Henrik Ibsen

=== 1907 ===
- Boris Godunov, by Alexander Pushkin

=== 1908 ===
- The Blue Bird, by Maurice Maeterlinck
- The Government Inspector, Nikolai Gogol

=== 1909 ===
- At the Gate of the Kingdom, by Knut Hamsun
- A Month in the Country, by Ivan Turgenev

=== 1910 ===
- Enough Stupidity in Every Wise Man, by Alexander Ostrovsky
- The Brothers Karamazov, by Fyodor Dostoyevsky

=== 1911 ===
- The Living Corpse, by Leo Tolstoy
- Hamlet, by William Shakespeare

=== 1912 ===
- Fortune's Fool, A Provincial Lady and It Tears Where It is Thin, by Ivan Turgenev
- Peer Gynt, by Henrik Ibsen

=== 1913 ===
- The Forced Marriage and The Imaginary Invalid by Molière

=== 1914 ===
- The Mistress of the Inn, by Carlo Goldoni
- Pasukhin's Death, by Mikhail Saltykov-Shchedrin

=== 1915 ===
- The Stone Guest, Mozart and Salieri and A Feast in Time of Plague, by Alexander Pushkin

=== 1916–17 ===
- The Village of Stepanchikovo, by Fyodor Dostoyevsky

Note: When more than one play is listed on the same line, it means that they were produced and performed together.

== See also ==
- MAT production of The Seagull (1898)
- MAT production of Hamlet (1911–12)
- Studio Six Theater Company

== Sources ==
- Banham, Martin, ed. 1998. The Cambridge Guide to Theatre. Cambridge: Cambridge University Press. ISBN 0-521-43437-8.
- Benedetti, Jean. 1991. The Moscow Art Theatre Letters. New York: Routledge.
- Benedetti, Jean. 1999. Stanislavski: His Life and Art. Revised edition. Original edition published in 1988. London: Methuen. ISBN 0-413-52520-1.
- Braun, Edward. 1982. "Stanislavsky and Chekhov". The Director and the Stage: From Naturalism to Grotowski. London: Methuen. 59–76. ISBN 0-413-46300-1.
- Bulgakov, Mikhail. 1996. Black Snow: Theatrical Novel. Trans. Michael Glenny. London: Hodder and Stoughton, 1967. London: Collins-Harvill, 1986, 1991, 1996.
- Gauss, Rebecca B. 1999. Lear's Daughters. New York: Peter Lang.
- Magarshack, David. 1950. Stanislavsky: A Life. London and Boston: Faber, 1986. ISBN 0-571-13791-1.
- Smeliansky, Anatoly. 1999. The Russian Theatre After Stalin. Cambridge: Cambridge University Press.
- Stanislavski, Constantin. 1938. An Actor’s Work: A Student’s Diary. Trans. and ed. Jean Benedetti. London: Routledge, 2008. ISBN 978-0-415-42223-9.
- Whyman, Rose. 2008. The Stanislavsky System of Acting: Legacy and Influence in Modern Performance. Cambridge: Cambridge UP. ISBN 978-0-521-88696-3.
- Worrall, Nick. 1996. The Moscow Art Theatre. Theatre Production Studies ser. London and NY: Routledge. ISBN 0-415-05598-9.
