= Sergey Zhenovach =

- Сергей Васильевич Женовач
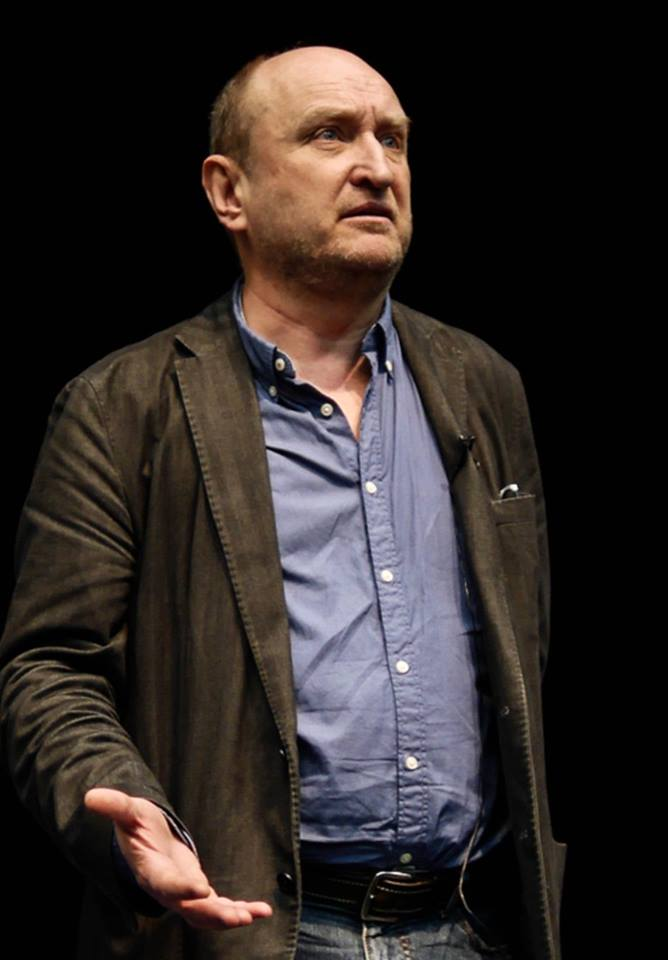
- Born: 15 May 1957 (age 69); Potsdam, East Germany
- Education: Russian Academy of Theatre Arts
- Known for: Director of the Moscow Chekhov Art Theatre
- Awards: State Prize of the Russian Federation; Golden Mask

Sergey Vasilyevich Zhenovach (Russian: Сергей Васильевич Женовач; born 15 May 1957, Potsdam, GDR) is a Soviet and Russian theater director, teacher, рrofessor. Founder and artistic Director Of the Studio Of Theatrical Art since 2005. Artistic Director of the Moscow Chekhov Art Theatre from 23 March 2018 until 27 October 2021.

Honored art worker of the Russian Federation. Laureate of the State Prize of the Russian Federation (2004). The Winner of the Golden Mask.
