= Igor Zolotovitskiy =

Russian actor (1961–2026)

- Игорь Золотовицкий
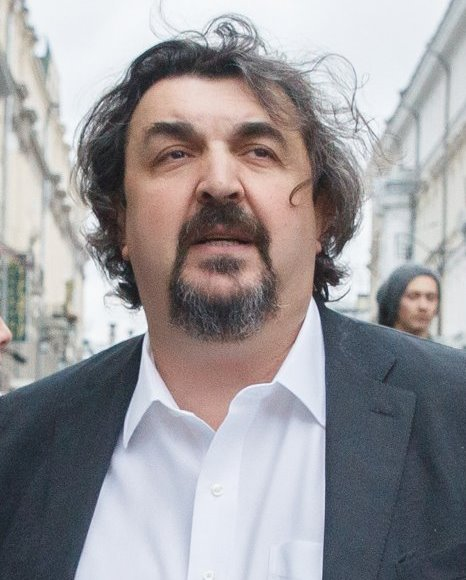
- Zolotovitskiy in 2014
- Born: Igor Yakovlevich Zolotovitskiy; 18 June 1961; Tashkent, Uzbek SSR, USSR
- Died: 14 January 2026 (aged 64); Moscow, Russia
- Citizenship: USSR→Russia
- Occupations: Actor; theatre teacher; television director; presenter
- Years active: 1983–2026
- Awards: Honored Artist of the Russian Federation (2002); Honored Artist of the Russian Federation (2020)

Igor Yakovlevich Zolotovitskiy (Russian: Игорь Яковлевич Золотовицкий; 18 June 1961 – 14 January 2026) was a Soviet and Russian actor, theatre teacher, television director and presenter. He was director of the Moscow Art Theatre School from 2013 until his death. Zolotovitskiy was an Honored Artist of the Russian Federation in 2002. Honored Artist of the Russian Federation (2020). Laureate of the Figaro Prize (2020).

== Early life and career ==
Igor Zolotovitskiy was born on 18 June 1961 in Tashkent, to Yakov and Sofia Zolotovitskaya. He graduated from the Moscow Art Theatre School (course of Viktor Monyukov) in 1983, and began teaching as a professor there in 1989. Between 1995 and 2001 he was one of the directors of the NTV dog show Me and My Dog In 1996, he hosted the NTV educational program Live News. In 2013, Zolotovitskiy was made rector of the school Moscow Art Theatre School. Between November 2016 and December 2018 he served as Deputy Artistic Director of the Moscow Chekhov Art Theatre.

== Personal life and death ==
Zolotovitskiy was married to actress and director Vera Kharybina, with whom he had two sons, both of whom are graduates of the Russian Institute of Theatre Arts.

Zolotovitskiy died from cancer in Moscow, on 14 January 2026, at the age of 64.

== Work ==
=== Theatre roles ===
Moscow Chekhov Art Theatre

- 2001 – No. 13 Ray Cooney. Director: Vladimir Mashkov – Ronnie
- 2003 – The Last Victim by Alexander Ostrovsky. Director: Yuri Yeryomin – Salai Saltanovich
- 2003 – The Siege by Yevgeni Grishkovetz. Director: Yevgeni Grishkovetz – The First Warrior
- 2004 – Playing the Victim by The Presnyakov Brothers. Director: Kirill Serebrennikov – Zakirov
- 2011 – The Master and Margarita by Mikhail Bulgakov. Director: Janos Szasz – Berlioz
- 2011 – The House by Yevgeni Grishkovetz. Director: Sergey Puskepalis – Igor
- 2014 – Drunken by Ivan Vyrypaev. Director: Viktor Ryzhakov – Karl
- 2014 – Illusions by Ivan Vyrypaev. Director: Viktor Ryzhakov
- 2021 – The Seagull by A.P. Chekhov. Director: O. Korshunovas – Evgeny Sergeevich Dorn (introduction)
- 2022 – Cyrano de Bergerac by Edmond Rostand. Director: Yegor Mikhailovich Peregudov – Count de Gish

=== Other theatre ===
- 1997 – The Dark Lady of Sonnets. Director: Roman Kozak. Et cetera Theater – The Sentinel
- 2000 – Shylock (The Merchant of Venice). Director: Robert Sturua. Et Cetera Theater.
- 2005 – Faster Than Rabbits. Quartet I Theater.
- 2019 – Blessed Island. Director: Mikhail Bychkov. Et Cetera Theater – Savvatiy Savelyevich Guska

=== Selected filmography ===
- Egorka (1984) as Rybakov, hydroacoustician
- This Fantastic World: Sign of the Salamander (1984) as fireman
- Amateurs (1985) as Bun
- This Fantastic World: No Messing with Robots (1987) as robot juror
- The Story of One Billiard Room teams (1988) as lieutenant
- How Dark the Nights Are on the Black Sea (1989)
- Taxi Blues (1990) as Petyunchik, Seliverstov's friend
- Sunset (1990) as Levka
- Broken Light (1990) as Oleg, actor of "Lenkocert"
- The Day Before to... (1991) as Dima
- Luna Park (1992) as restaurant owner
- Prorva (1992) as taxi driver
- Russian Project (1995) as passerby (video "Remember Your Loved Ones")
- Chekhov and Co (1998) as German salesman (episode 1, short story "Forgot")
- Composition for Victory Day (1998) as psychologist
- Mother (1999) as mental hospital administrator
- Moscow (2000) as Tall
- The Fifth Corner (2001) as Viktor Chagin
- Summer Rain (2002) as Dima
- Lighter (2003) as Vovchik
- Remote access (2004) as Andrey
- The Most Beautiful (2005) as Man
- Horror Novel (2005) as Yur Yurych
- Unexpected Joy (2005) as Nikolay Budko
- Fool (2005) as Ivan Ageyev
- Rabbit Over the Void (2006) as Malay
- Collector (2016) as Kurchatov, journalist, host of radio "Echo of Moscow" (voice)
- Story of One Appointment (2018) as Nikolai Ilyich, manager of the estate of Count L. N. Tolstoy
- Love (2021) as Nikolay
