= Moscow Art Theatre School =

Russian studio school of the Moscow Art Theatre

- Школа-студия (институт) имени Вл. И. Немировича-Данченко при МХАТ имени А. П. Чехова
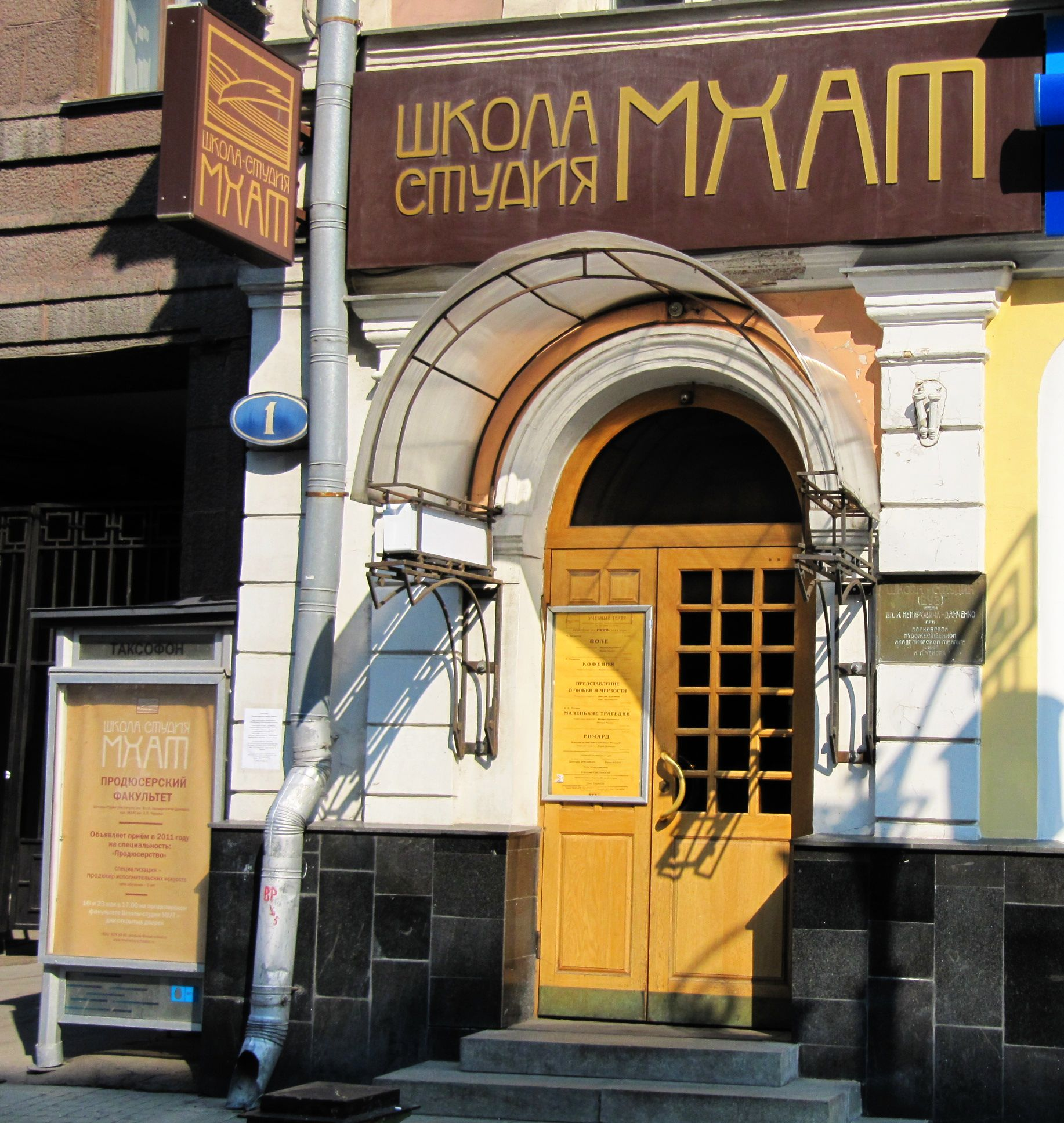
- Type: studio school
- Established: 26 April 1943
- Location: 6 Tverskaya Street, Moscow, Russia; 55.7597°N 37.6124°E
- Website: artsacademy.ru

Moscow Art Theatre School (Russian: Школа-студия МХАТ, romanized: Shkola-studiya MKhAT) is the studio school of the Moscow Chekhov Art Theatre. It is a state educational institution that has existed since 1943. The initiator of the studio school was Vladimir Nemirovich-Danchenko.

Open three faculties — the cast (training — 4 years, the competition — 30 per place), staging (training — 5 years, the contest — 3 persons per place) and Producer (training — 5 years, the competition — 4 persons per place). Form of study — full-time.

== History ==
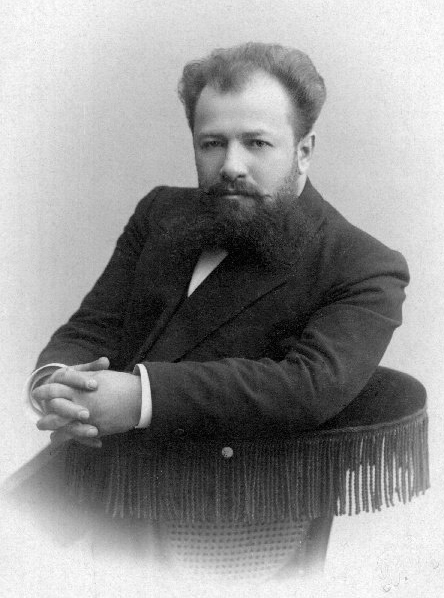
Vladimir Nemirovich-Danchenko

The idea of the studio-school was expressed for the first time at the meeting of the leaders of Moscow Art Theater on March 21, 1943. It was the last will of the director and pedagogue Vladimir Nemirovich-Danchenko, who died of a heart attack a month later, April 25, 1943. The following day (April 26, 1943), a special resolution of the Council of People's Commissars of the Russian Soviet Federative Socialist Republic was published, which contained a clause relating to the creation of the studio school.

The studio-school was inaugurated on October 20, 1943. The first rector was the theater director and critic Vassili Grigorievich Sakhnovski. The first class consisted of 27 students graduating in 1947.

In the 1940s, there was just one faculty for drama theater and cinema actors. In 1987, a new branch for theater painters was opened under the direction of Valeri Yakovlevich Levental. During 1989, a new department for artist-technologists for stage costume was opened under the direction of the People's Artist of Russia Eleonora Petrovna Maklakova. The Department for lighting artists was opened in 1988.

In 1991, a department of theater management was established in the theatre school. In 2005, the department was transformed into a producer faculty.

== Rectors ==
(in chronological order)

- Vasily Sahnovsky (1943–1945)
- Veniamin Radomyslensky (1945–1980)
- Nikolai Alekseev (1980–1983)
- Vadim Krupitsky (1984–1986)
- Oleg Tabakov (1986–2000)
- Anatoly Smelyansky (2000–2013)
- Igor Zolotovitskiy (2013–2026)
