= Secretariat of the 20th Congress of the Communist Party of the Soviet Union =

The 20th Secretariat of the Communist Party of the Soviet Union was elected by the 20th Central Committee in the aftermath of the 20th Congress.

== List of members ==
Name (birth–death)	Took office	Left office	Duration	Note
Nikita Khrushchev (1894–1971)	27 February 1956	31 October 1961	5 years, 246 days	Elected First Secretary at the 1st Plenary Session.
Averky Aristov (1903–1973)	27 February 1956	4 May 1960	4 years, 67 days	Relieved of his duties at the 16th Plenary Session.
Nikolay Belyaev (1903–1966)	27 February 1956	12 November 1958	2 years, 258 days	Relieved of his duties at the 11th Plenary Session.
Leonid Brezhnev (1906–1982)	27 February 1956	16 July 1960	4 years, 140 days	Relieved of his duties at the 17th Plenary Session.
Yekaterina Furtseva (1910–1974)	27 February 1956	4 May 1960	4 years, 67 days	Relieved of her duties at the 15th Plenary Session.
Alexei Kirichenko (1908–1975)	17 December 1957	4 May 1960	2 years, 139 days	Elected at the 6th Plenary Session, relieved of his duties at the 15th Plenary Session.
Frol Kozlov (1908–1965)	4 May 1960	31 October 1961	1 year, 180 days	Elected at the 15th Plenary Session.
Nikolay Ignatov (1901–1966)	17 December 1957	4 May 1960	2 years, 139 days	Elected at the 6th Plenary Session, and relieved of his duties at the 15th Plenary Session.
Otto Wille Kuusinen (1881–1964)	29 June 1957	31 October 1961	4 years, 124 days	Elected at the 4th Plenary Session.
Nuritdin Mukhitdinov (1917–2008)	17 December 1957	31 October 1961	3 years, 318 days	Elected at the 4th Plenary Session.
Pyotr Pospelov (1898–1979)	27 February 1956	4 May 1960	4 years, 67 days	Elected at the 15th Plenary Session.
Dmitri Shepilov (1905–1995)	27 February 1956	24 December 1956	301 days	Relieved of his duties at the 2nd Plenary Session.
Dmitri Shepilov (1905–1995)	14 February 1957	29 June 1957	135 days	Elected at the 3rd Plenary Session, and relieved of his duties at the 4th Plenary Session.
Mikhail Suslov (1902–1982)	27 February 1956	31 October 1961	5 years, 246 days	—
