= Taxi Blues =

1990 film

- Film poster
- Directed by: Pavel Lungin
- Written by: Pavel Lungin
- Produced by: Mark Gekht; Aleksandr Golutva; Pierre Rival
- Starring: Pyotr Mamonov; Pyotr Zaychenko; Vladimir Kashpur, Natalya Kolyakanova
- Cinematography: Denis Yevstigneyev
- Edited by: Elisabeth Guido
- Release date: 7 September 1990
- Running time: 110 minutes
- Country: Soviet Union
- Language: Russian

Taxi Blues (Russian: Такси-блюз, translit. Taksi-Blyuz) is a 1990 Soviet comedy-drama film directed by Pavel Lungin. It was entered into the 1990 Cannes Film Festival where Lungin won the award for Best Director. The film was selected as the Soviet entry for the Best Foreign Language Film at the 63rd Academy Awards, but was not accepted as a nominee. The film tells the story of Shlykov, a hard-working taxi driver and Lyosha, a saxophonist, develop a bizarre love-hate relationship, and despite their prejudices, realize they are not so different after all.

== Plot ==
Shlykov, a hard-working taxi driver and Lyosha, a saxophonist, develop a bizarre love-hate relationship, and despite their prejudices, realize they are not so different after all.

== Cast ==
- Pyotr Mamonov as Lyosha
- Pyotr Zaychenko as Shlykov
- Vladimir Kashpur as Old Nechiporenko
- Natalya Kolyakanova as Christina
- Hal Singer as himself
- Yelena Safonova as Nina, Liocha's Wife
- Sergey Gazarov as Administrator
- Yevgeni Gerchakov as Bald Musician in the Taxi
- Dmitri Prigov as Writer Typing in the Train
- Igor Zolotovitskiy as Petyunchik
- Valeri Khlevinsky as Fat Kolya
- Yelena Stepanova as Smart Young Girl
- Vladimir Sterzhakov as Musician in the Taxi
- Konstantin Afonsky as Long-Haired Mechanic
- Aleksandr Buyanov as Passenger with Newspaper
- Lidiya Yezhevskaya as 'Mousy' Valya

== Reception ==
Taxi Blues has an approval rating of 71% on review aggregator website Rotten Tomatoes, based on 7 reviews, and an average rating of 6/10.

== See also ==
- List of submissions to the 63rd Academy Awards for Best Foreign Language Film
- List of Soviet submissions for the Academy Award for Best Foreign Language Film
