= Studio Six Theater Company =

Theatre company in New York, US

The Studio Six Theater Company is a New York-based acting company, founded in 2006. Its members were all trained in the classical Stanislavsky method at the School of the Moscow Art Theatre (MXAT), and they are the first group of American students to complete a full four-year course of study at the School. Their focus is to introduce traditional Russian dramatic theater to the American audience in its native English.

== New York debut ==
In August 2007, Studio Six performed Too Clever By Half, or The Diary of a Scoundrel by Aleksandr Ostrovsky, as part of the New York International Fringe Festival.

== Baltimore debut ==
In 2010, the company brought its production "...the itsy bitsy spider..." directed by Alexandre Marine to Baltimore's Theatre Project, subsequently winning the Best of Baltimore prize for best production.

== Hidden Fees (a play about money) ==
In August 2008, Studio Six will return to the New York International Fringe Festival to perform Hidden Fees (a play about money), translated from a script by Russian playwright Victoria Nikiforova.

== In the press ==
- New Yorkers in Moscow follow Stanislavsky's path (New York Times: May 21, 2005)
- US actors make Russian theater their own (Christian Science Monitor: January 31, 2006)
- "Too Clever By Half" reviewed in 2007 New York City Fringe Festival (offoffonline.com: August 12, 2007)
- "Too Clever By Half" reviewed in 2007 New York City Fringe Festival (NYTheatre.com: August 16, 2007)
- "Too Clever By Half" reviewed in 2007 New York City Fringe Festival (CurtainUp.com: August 16, 2007)
