= Zhavoronki =

Village in Moscow Oblast, Russia

Coordinates: 55.6420°N 37.0969°E

Zhavoronki is a village (before 2004, a settlement) in Odintsovsky District in Moscow Oblast, Russia. It is the administrative center of the Zhavoronkovskoye Rural Settlement.

There is a railway station in the village. Trains serving the Belorussky suburban railway line stop there.
