= Chamberlain Lane =

Street in Moscow, Russia

Coordinates: 55°45′35″N 37°36′48″E

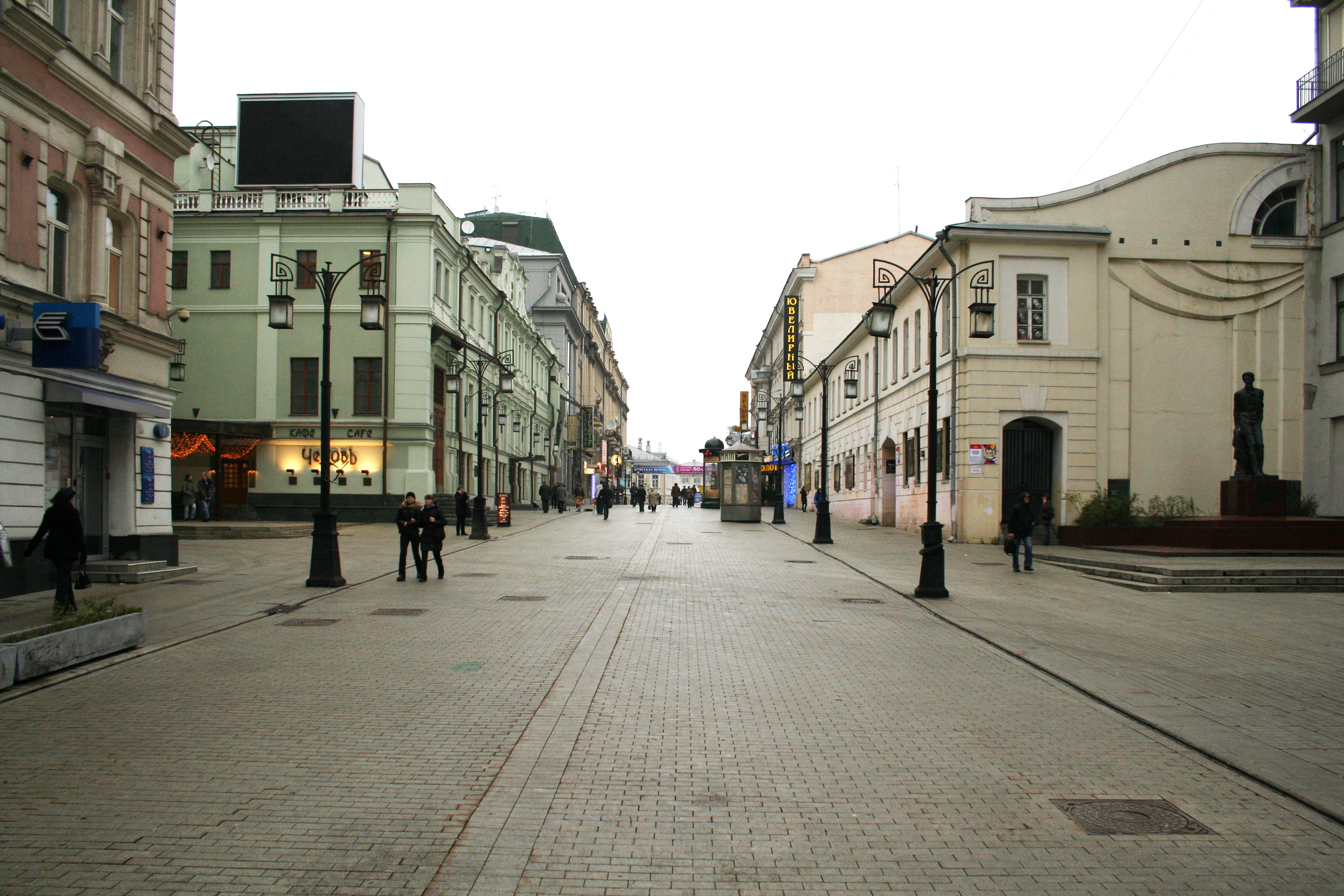
- Native name: Камергерский переулок (Russian)
- Location: Moscow; Central Administrative Okrug; Tverskoy District
- Nearest metro station: Okhotny Ryad (300 m.); Teatralnaya (250 m)

Kamergerskiy Pereulok or Chamberlain Lane (Russian: Камергерский переулок) is a short street with many historical buildings located within the Boulevard Ring in central Moscow. Almost all of the buildings on Chamberlain Lane are classified as architectural monuments.

The street runs from Tverskaya Street in the west to Bolshaya Dmitrovka Street in the east.

== Artists ==
The lane is associated with the life and work of many Russian cultural figures. Artists who lived on Chamberlain Lane include writers Vladimir Odoyevsky, Yuri Samarin, Leo Tolstoy, Yury Olesha, Mikhail Svetlov, Eduard Bagritsky, Lev Kassil, Mikhail Sholokhov, and Venedikt Yerofeyev; poet Novella Matveyeva; actors Vera Pashennaya, Vasily Kachalov, Alla Tarasova, Mark Prudkin, Nikolai Khmelyov, Sofya Giatsintova, Lyubov Orlova; painter Vasily Tropinin; and composer Sergei Prokofiev.

== Gallery ==
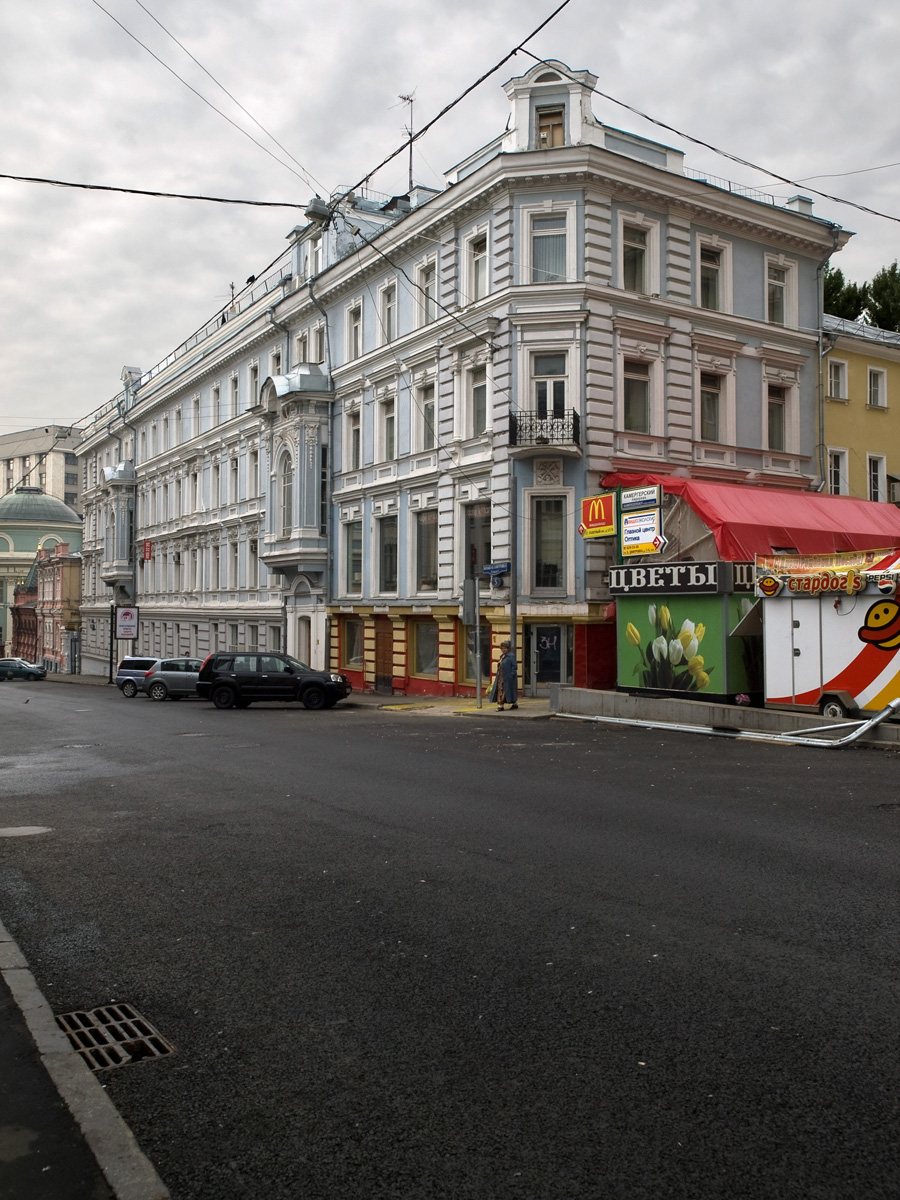

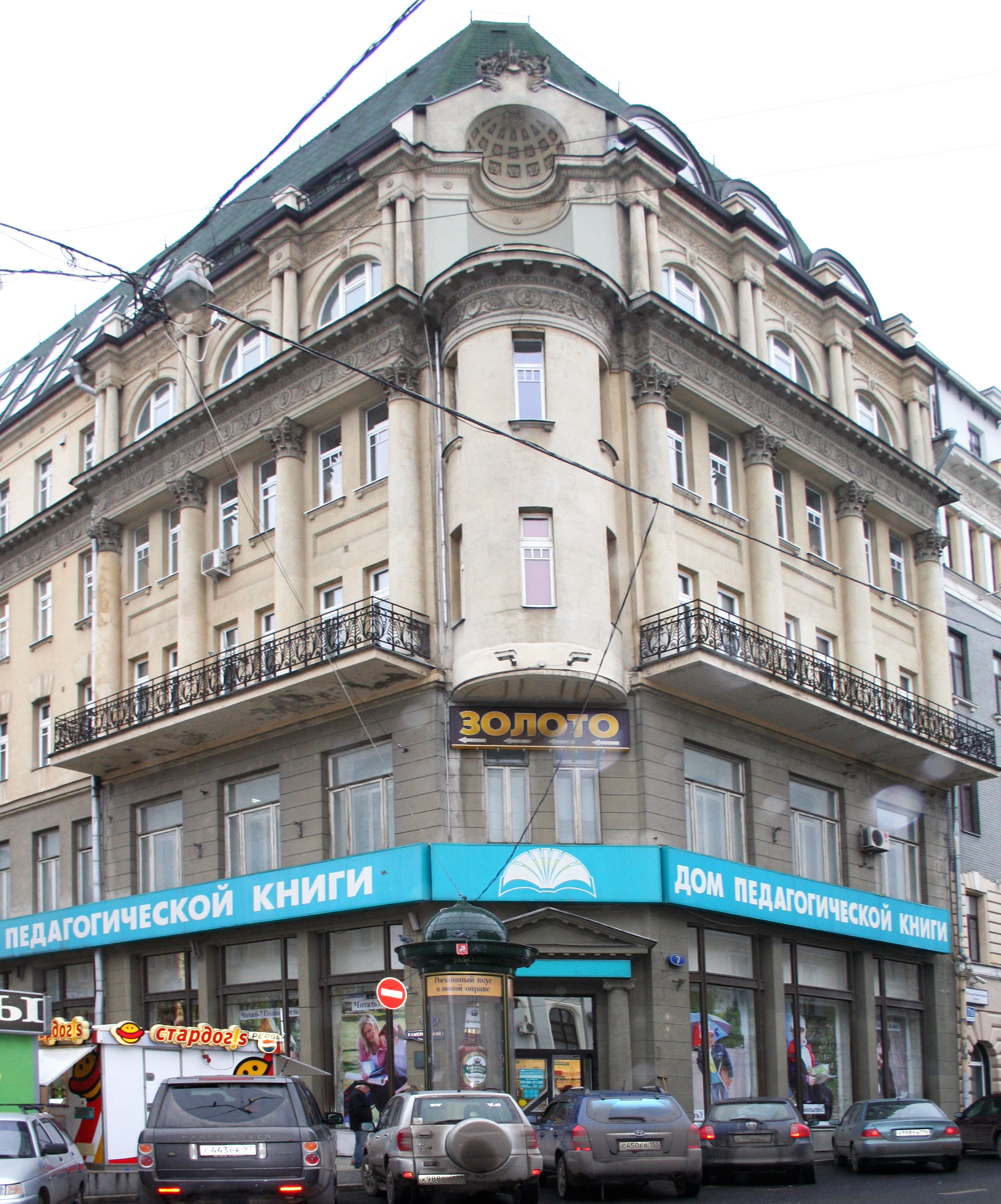

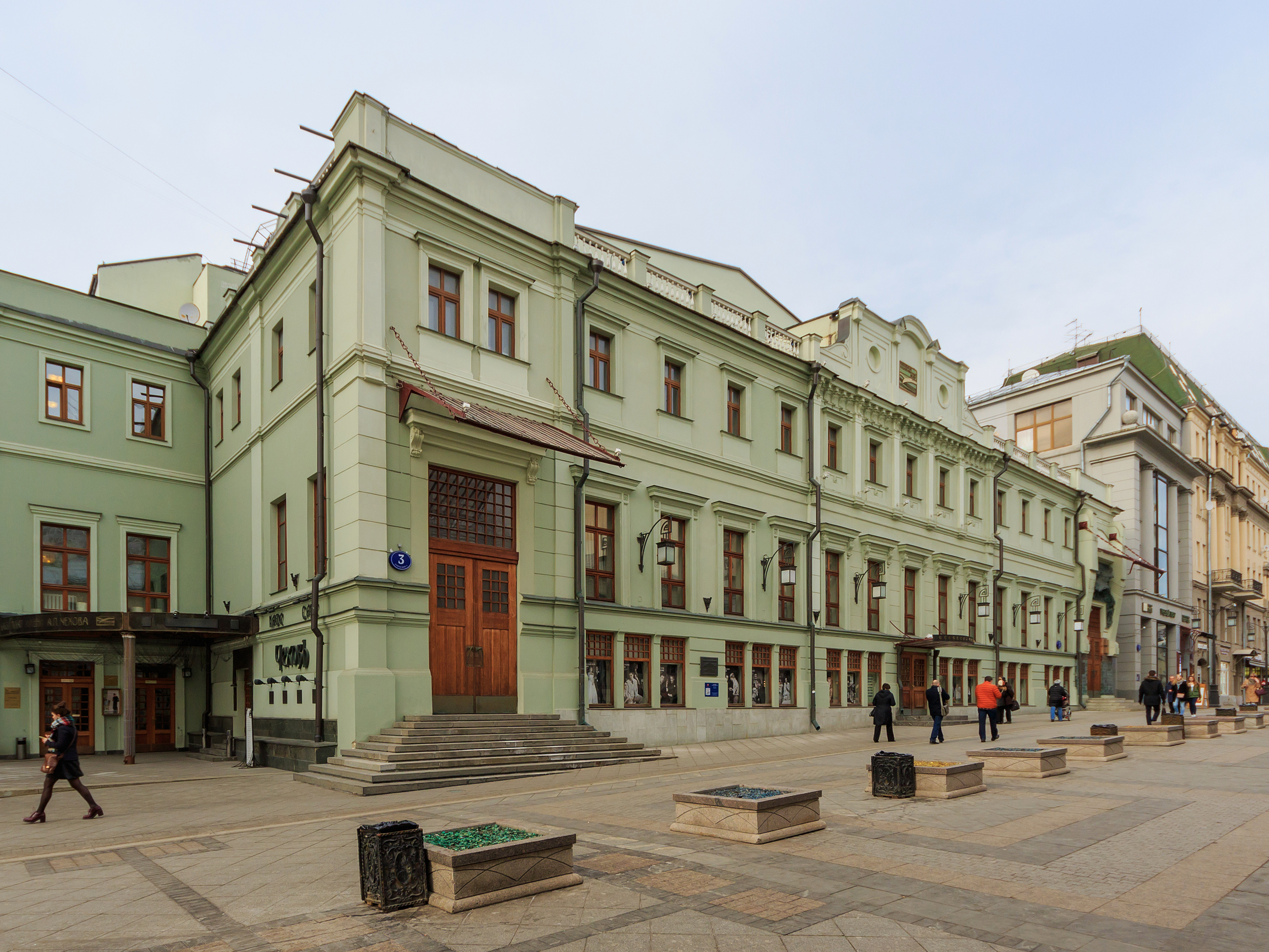
Moscow Chekhov Art Theatre

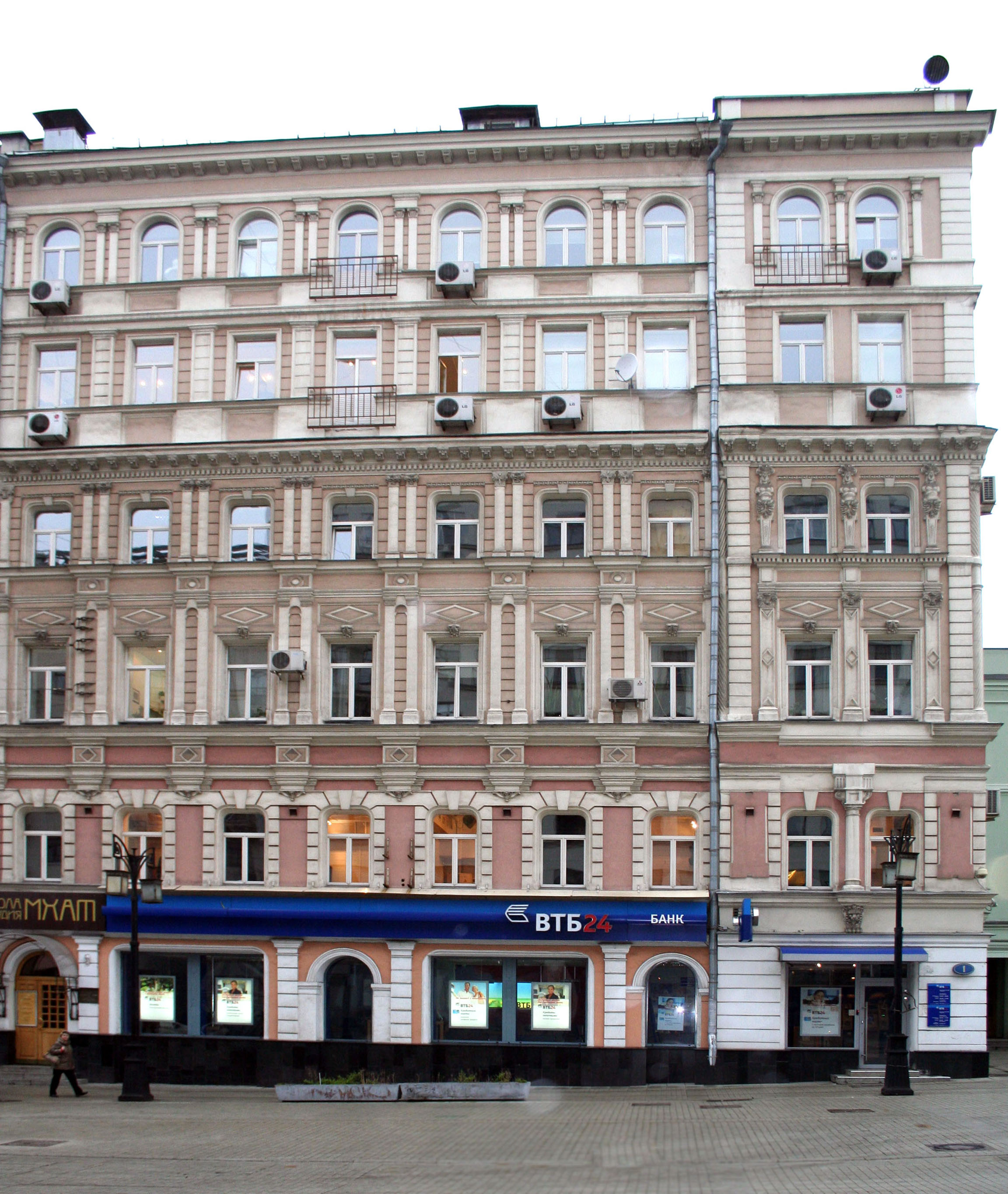

== Sources ==
- Lonely Planet; Mara Vorhees; Leonid Ragozin (1 February 2015). Lonely Planet Moscow. Lonely Planet Publications. ISBN 978-1-74360-504-2.
- Sytin, P. V. (П. В. Сытин) (1948). Iz istorii moskovskikh ulits (Из истории московских улиц) (in Russian). Moscow: MR.
