= Moscow Chekhov Art Theatre =

Theatre in Moscow, Russia

- Московский Художественный театр имени А. П. Чехова
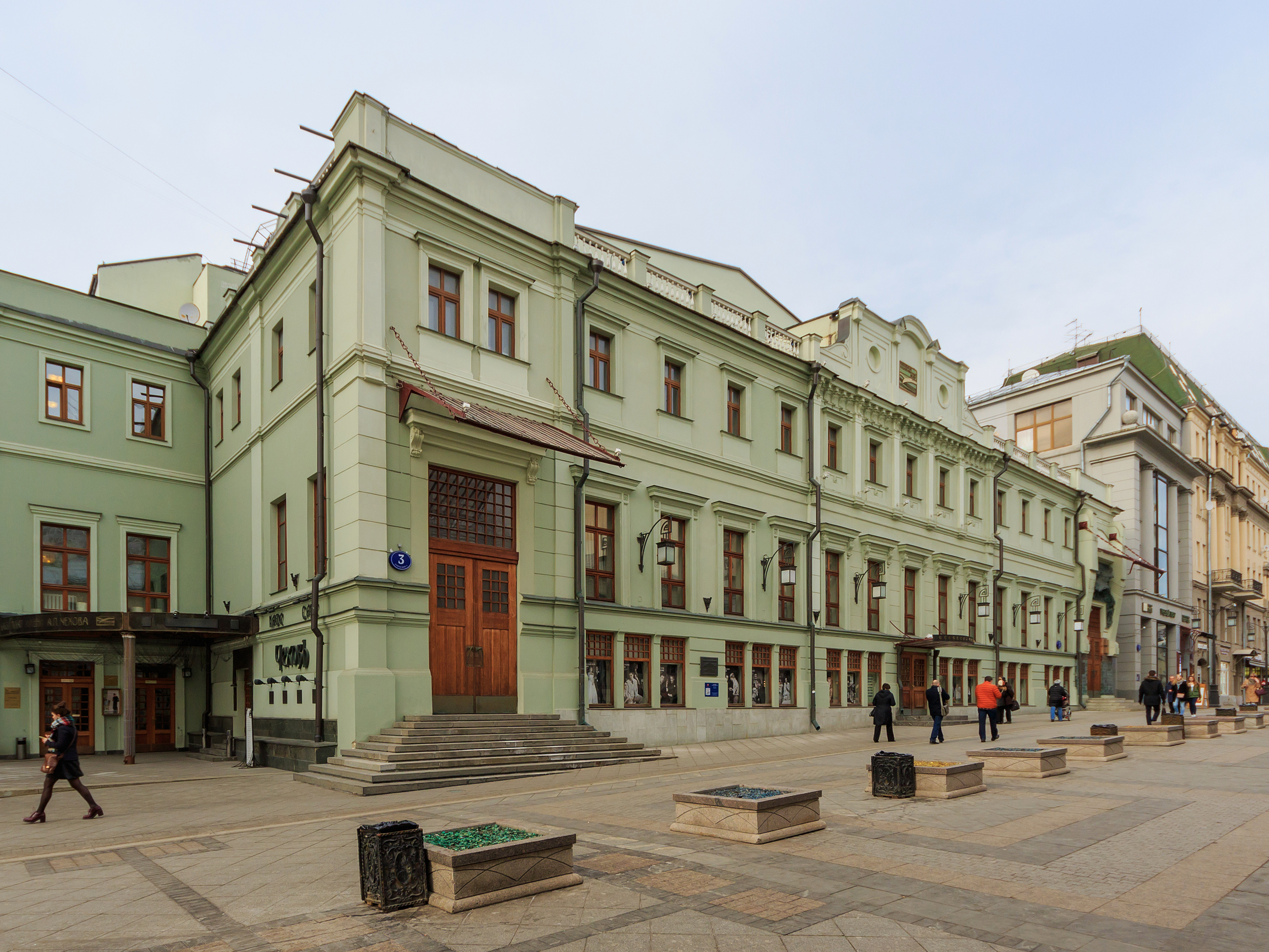
- Interactive map of Moscow Chekhov Art Theatre
- Address: Moscow; Russia
- Coordinates: 55°45′37″N 37°36′47″E
- Type: Drama theatre

Construction
- Opened: 1898 / 1987
- Architect: Fyodor Schechtel

Website
- mxat.ru

Moscow Chekhov Art Theatre (Russian: Московский Художественный театр имени А. П. Чехова) is a drama theatre in Moscow founded in 1987 after the division of the Gorky Moscow Art Theatre into two theatres. Since 1989, it has been named after Anton Pavlovich Chekhov, one of its main authors. In 2004, it returned to its historical name, "Moscow Art Theatre", abandoning the title "academic". Its artistic director is Konstantin Khabensky, People's Artist of the Russian Federation(since October 28, 2021).

== History ==
=== Theatre under Oleg Efremov (1987-2000) ===
The Moscow Art Theatre of the USSR was created in 1987 after the signing of Order No. 383 by the Minister of Culture of the Soviet Union, Vasily Zakharov. According to this document, the theatre was officially divided into two: the Moscow Gorky Academic Art Theatre on Tverskoy Boulevard under the direction of Tatiana Doronina and the Chekhov Art Theatre (for two years after the division, it also bore the name of Gorky) on Kamergersky Lane. The theatre director, People's Artist of the USSR, Oleg Yefremov was appointed its director. In the same year, the premiere of the play "Pearl Zinaida", staged by Efremov, took place.

In 1989, the Moscow Art Theatre was named after Chekhov. In 1996, by decree of the president of Russia Boris Yeltsin, the theatre was added to the list of cultural heritage sites of Russia. On June 16, 1997, the Russian Government approved the theatre's charter and officially appointed Oleg Nikolaevich Efremov as artistic director of the Chekhov Moscow Art Theatre.

On May 24, 2000, the theatre's artistic director Oleg Yefremov died.

=== 2000-2018 ===
After the death of Oleg Yefremov in 2000, People's Artist of the USSR Oleg Tabakov became the artistic director of the Moscow Chekhov Art Theatre. He set a course for updating the repertoire and troupe, and attracting a wide range of spectators to the theatre. The emphasis was placed on both classical works of world drama - "The White Guard", "Hamlet", "The Cherry Orchard", "The Golovlyov Family", "King Lear", "Tartuffe", "Ivanov", "Vassa Zheleznova", "The Marriage", "Zoyka's Apartment", and on contemporary Russian and foreign drama - plays by Olga Mukhina, the Presnyakov brothers, Mikhail and Vyacheslav Durnenkov, Vasily Sigarev and other authors were performed on the theatre stage. At Tabakov's invitation, the troupe included Olga Yakovleva, Avangard Leontiev, Alla Pokrovskaya, Valery Khlevinsky, Vladimir Krasnov, Marina Golub, Sergey Sosnovsky, Boris Plotnikov, Dmitry Nazarov, Konstantin Khabensky, Mikhail Porechenkov, Anatoly Bely, Mikhail Trukhin, Alexey Kravchenko, Ksenia Lavrova-Glinka, Yury Chursin, Irina Pegova, Fyodor Lavrov, Maxim Matveyev, Alexey Devotchenko and others. Leading directors began to be involved in the creation of performances: Mindaugas Karbauskis, Sergey Zhenovach, Viktor Ryzhakov, Yury Butusov, Evgeny Pisarev, Adolf Shapiro, Vladimir Mashkov, Kirill Serebrennikov, Konstantin Bogomolov, Marina Brusnikina, Vladimir Petrov, Temur Chkheidze, Tadashi Suzuki, Dmitry Brusnikin, Lev Ehrenburg, Anton Yakovlev, Marat Gatsalov, Vasily Barkhatov, Sergey Puskepalis, Alla Sigalova, Dmitry Krymov and others.

Both productions and directors regularly participate in and become laureates of prestigious theater festivals, such as the Golden Mask, Crystal Turandot, Cherry Forest, the Konstantin Stanislavsky Foundation Festival, the Seagull Prize and others.

In 2001, the New Stage of the theater was opened in house 3-A on Kamergersky Lane, intended for experimental productions. It became the third stage of the theater, complementing the Main and Small Stages.

In 2004, the theater returned to its historical name of Moscow Art Theater (MKhT), removing the word "academic" from the name.

In 2006-2007, on the initiative of Oleg Tabakov, a large-scale reconstruction of the Main Stage and the auditorium was carried out, thanks to which the Moscow Art Theatre became one of the most technically equipped theatres in the world: during the work, the upper and lower mechanisms of the stage, sound and lighting equipment were updated.

In 2010, the Moscow Art Theatre issued a limited edition commemorative medal for the 150th anniversary of Chekhov. The award was presented to outstanding cultural figures from Russia and foreign countries for their personal contribution to the development of art, preserving the memory of Chekhov's work. That same year, the anniversary evening "Our Chekhov" was held on the Main Stage, staged by Yevgeny Pisarev based on letters from the playwright and the founders of the Art Theatre.

For the anniversary of Konstantin Stanislavsky in 2012, with the support of the Ministry of Culture, the Internet project "Heritage of the Art Theatre. Electronic Library" was launched. Books from the Moscow Art Theatre publishing house, as well as television and film versions of plays and series of television programs created by the Kultura TV channel in the 1990s and 2000s, were made available to the public.
