= Yekaterina Furtseva =

Soviet politician (1910–1974)

- Екатерина Фурцева
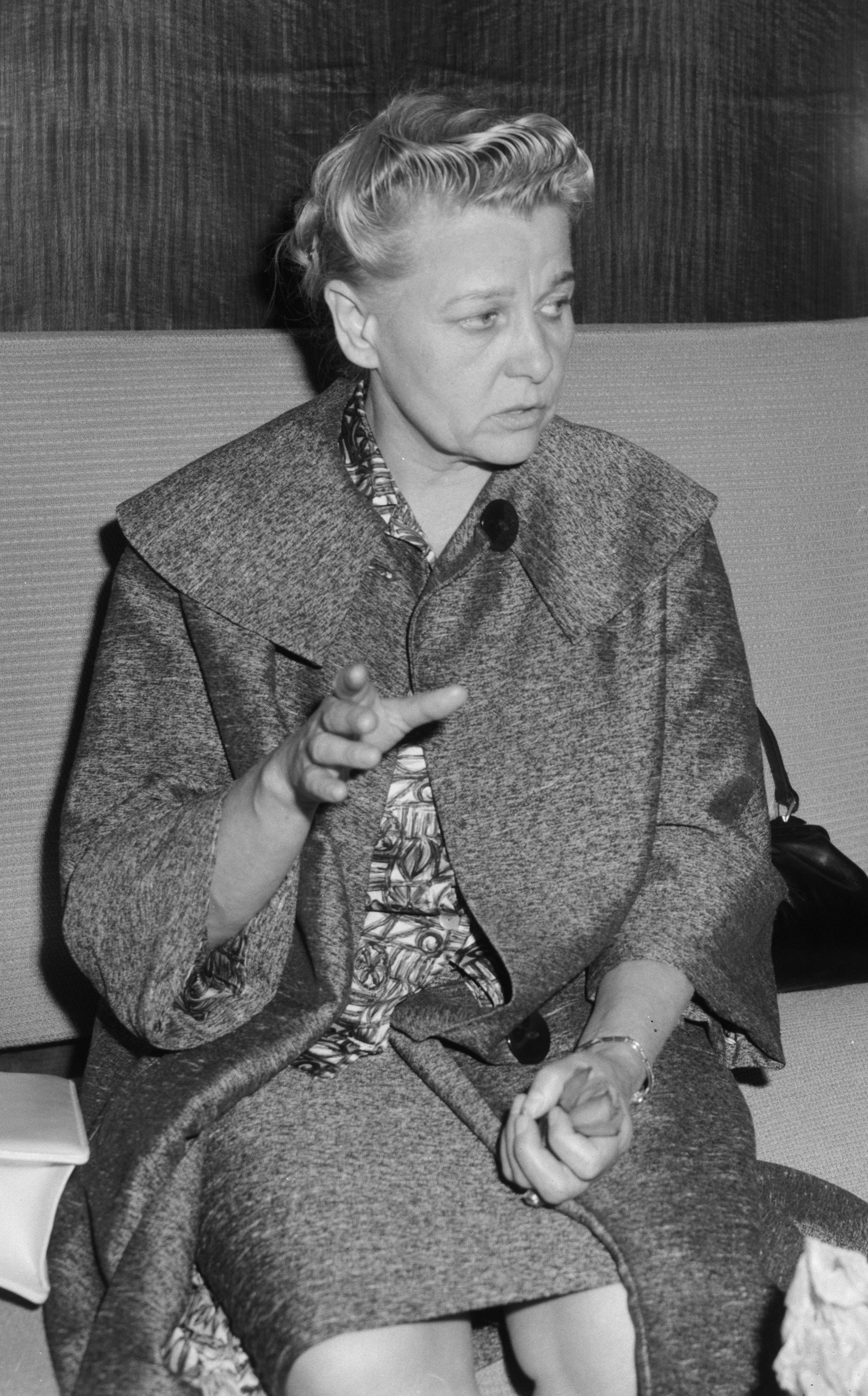
- Furtseva in 1963

Minister of Culture
- In office 4 May 1960 – 24 October 1974
- Premier: Nikita Khrushchev; Alexei Kosygin
- Preceded by: Nikolai Mikhailov
- Succeeded by: Pyotr Demichev

First Secretary of the Moscow City Party Committee
- In office 17 November 1954 – 30 June 1957
- Preceded by: Ivan Kapitonov
- Succeeded by: Vladimir Ustinov

Member of the 20th Presidium
- In office 29 June 1957 – 31 October 1961

Candidate of the 20th Presidium
- In office 27 February 1956 – 29 June 1957

Member of the 20th Secretariat
- In office 27 February 1956 – 4 May 1960

Personal details
- Born: 24 November 1910 Vyshny Volochyok, Tver Governorate, Russian Empire
- Died: 24 October 1974 (aged 63) Moscow, Russian SFSR, Soviet Union
- Party: Communist Party of the Soviet Union
- Profession: Civil servant

Yekaterina Alexeyevna Furtseva (Russian: Екатерина Алексеевна Фурцева; 7 December 1910 – 24 October 1974) was a Soviet politician and member of the Communist Party of the Soviet Union (CPSU). She was the second woman to be elected member of the CPSU Presidium (20th term) and the fourth woman elected to the CPSU Secretariat (20th term). The first female Politburo and Secretariat member was Yelena Stasova.

== Biography ==
Furtseva was born in Vyshny Volochyok. Until the 1940s, she worked as an ordinary weaver at one of Moscow's textile factories. She had been a minor party worker in Kursk and the Crimea, and was called to Moscow and sent to the Institute of Chemical Technology from where she graduated in 1941 as a chemical engineer. Furtseva's party career started under Joseph Stalin. Gradually, she became active in Komsomol affairs and rose to the position of Secretary of the Moscow City Council in 1950. She gave a speech at the 19th Congress of the CPSU in 1952, the last party congress of the Stalin era, where she was also elected a candidate member of the Central Committee of the CPSU. Under Nikita Khrushchev, who sympathized with her, Furtseva was the first secretary of Moscow Committee of the CPSU from 1954 to 1957, a job Khrushchev himself occupied in 1930s.

In 1952, Furtseva attacked the leading film star, Boris Babochkin, who was famous after starring as Vasily Chapayev. This time Furtseva saw the actor starring in a stageplay, and was enraged by Babochkin's satirical portrayal of the Soviet communist leadership. Her angry article in the Soviet newspaper Pravda called for censorship of Babochkin, while Furtseva furthered her career in the Soviet elite. Then Furtseva personally ordered that all film studios and drama companies of the USSR should refuse Babochkin any jobs, keeping him unemployed.

In 1956 she was appointed a Secretary of the Central Committee and was elected a candidate member of Presidium of the Central Committee (aka the Politburo). She became the first woman to join the Politburo the next year. In this capacity, she sided with Khrushchev in de-Stalinization during the Khrushchev's Thaw, and secured the downfall of Vyacheslav Molotov, Georgy Malenkov, and Lazar Kaganovich when they conspired to depose her patron.

During that time she fell in love with Nikolay Firyubin, the Soviet ambassador in Yugoslavia. Furtseva scandalized the Soviet elite by her weekend trips abroad in order to meet her lover. As he married her and rose to become the Deputy Foreign Minister, they settled in Moscow, and their relations cooled down somewhat.

In May 1960, Furtseva suddenly lost her position as a Secretary of the Central Committee, and was appointed USSR Minister for Culture. The reason, reputedly, is that she criticised Khrushchev in a telephone conversation, and he came to hear of it. At the next party congress, in October 1961, she was also removed from the Praesidium. On learning of her dismissal, she reputedly attempted suicide by cutting her wrists. However, she retained her post as Minister for Culture for 14 years. As she became highly influential, many remarkable actors and directors tried to secure her friendship in order to further their own careers. According to the most intimate of her friends (such as the singer Lyudmila Zykina), she also became addicted to alcohol. On 19 June 1974, Pravda revealed that she had failed to be re-elected to the Supreme Soviet. Two months previous she had been disciplined by the Party for extravagance and fined 40,000 rubles. She died in Moscow a few months later, officially of heart failure. Yet there were rumors that she was implicated in illegal commercial dealings and, wishing to preclude the impending scandal and disgrace, committed suicide. Furtseva is buried at the Novodevichye Cemetery.
