= Tishanskaya =

Tishanskaya Тишанская
- Stanitsa
- Location within Volgograd Oblast Location within Russia
- Coordinates: 50°21′N 42°00′E
- Country: Russia
- Region: Volgograd Oblast
- District: Nekhayevsky District
- Time zone: UTC+4:00

Tishanskaya (Russian: Тишанская) is a rural locality (a stanitsa) and the administrative center of Tishanskoye Rural Settlement, Nekhayevsky District, Volgograd Oblast, Russia. The population was 358 as of 2010. There are 10 streets.

== Geography ==
Tishanskaya is located 23 km southeast of Nekhayevskaya (the district's administrative centre) by road. Krasnovsky is the nearest rural locality.
