= Vasily Zakharov =

Soviet politician (1934–2023)

- Василий Захаров

Minister of Culture
- In office 17 August 1986 – June 1989
- Premier: Nikolai Ryzhkov
- Preceded by: Pyotr Demichev

Personal details
- Born: Vasily Georgievich Zakharov; 5 January 1934 Khriply, Firovsky district, Kalinin region, RSFSR
- Died: 17 October 2023 (aged 89)
- Party: Communist Party
- Education: Leningrad State University

Vasily Georgievich Zakharov (Russian: Василий Георгиевич Захаров; 5 January 1934 – 17 October 2023) was a Soviet and Russian economist who served as the minister of culture between 1986 and 1989 in the Soviet Union. He was a member of central committee of the Communist Party.

== Biography ==
Zakharov was born in the village of Khriply, Firovsky district, Kalinin region, on 5 January 1934. He is a graduate of Leningrad State University where he received a PhD in economics in 1957. He later became a full professor. He taught at the Tomsk Polytechnic Institute and Leningrad Technological Institute.

Zakharov's career at the Communist Party began in 1973 when he was named as the head of the propaganda and agitation department in Leningrad. He moved to Moscow in 1983 because of his appointment as first deputy chief of the propaganda department of the party's central committee. From January 1986 he worked as the second secretary of the Moscow City central committee under Boris Yeltsin. In March 1986 Zakharov became one of the central committee members of the Communist Party. On 17 August 1986 he was named the minister of culture, replacing Pyotr Demichev in the post. In June 1989 Zakharov was again proposed by Soviet Premier Nikolai Ryzhkov as minister of culture. However, he and other five nominees were rejected by the Supreme Soviet in July 1989.

Zakharov died on 17 October 2023, at the age of 89.
