= Ministry of Culture (Soviet Union) =

Government ministry of the Soviet Union

Ministry of Culture of the USSR
- Министерство культуры СССР

Agency overview
- Formed: 15 March 1953
- Dissolved: 27 November 1991
- Superseding agency: Ministry of Culture of the Russian Federation (1992)
- Jurisdiction: Government of the Soviet Union
- Headquarters: Moscow, RSFSR, Soviet Union

The Ministry of Culture of the Union of Soviet Socialist Republics (USSR) (Министерство культуры СССР), formed in 1936, was one of the most important government offices in the Soviet Union. It was formerly (until 1946) known as the State Committee on the Arts (Комитет по делам искусств). The Ministry, at the all-Union level, was established in 1953, after existing as a State Committee of the Council of Ministers for several years. The Ministry was led by the Minister of Culture, prior to 1953 a chairman, who was nominated by the Chairman of the Council of Ministers and confirmed by the Presidium of the Supreme Soviet, and was a member of the Council of Ministers of the USSR. It was responsible for the cultural affairs and activities within the Soviet Union.

== List of ministers of culture ==
- Panteleimon Ponomarenko (March 15, 1953 - March 9, 1954)
- Georgy Aleksandrov (March 9, 1954 - March 10, 1955)
- Nikolai Mikhailov (March 21, 1955 - May 4, 1960)
- Yekaterina Furtseva (May 4, 1960 - October 24, 1974)
- Pyotr Demichev (November 14, 1974 - June 18, 1986)
- Vasily Zakharov (August 15, 1986 - June 7, 1989)
- Nikolai Gubenko (November 21, 1989 - August 28, 1991; September 7, 1991 - November 27, 1991)

== See also ==
- Government of the Soviet Union (Council of Ministers) – Ministries
